= Ruthy Hebard =

American basketball player (born 1998)

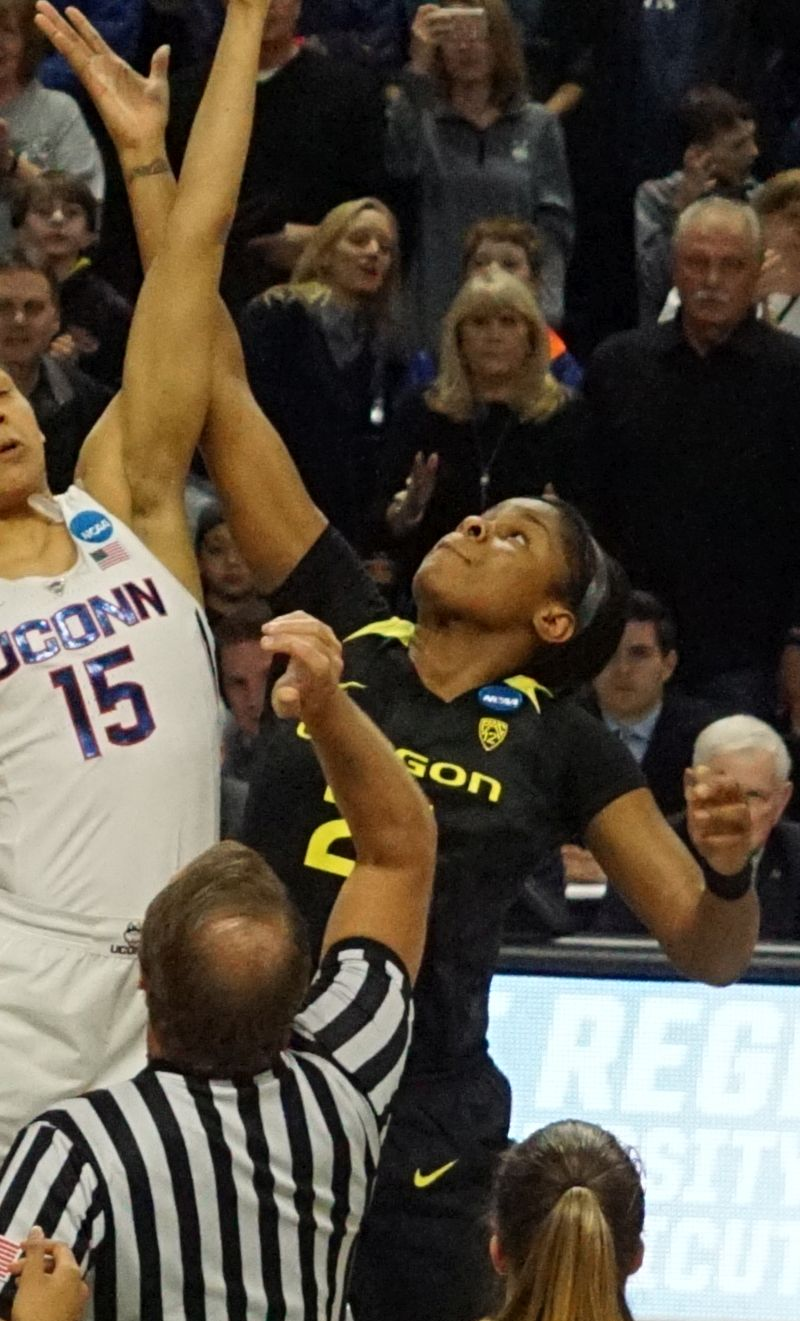
- Hebard in 2017

TCU Horned Frogs
- Title: Assistant coach
- League: Big 12 Conference

Personal information
- Born: April 28, 1998 (age 28) Chicago, Illinois, U.S.
- Listed height: 6 ft 4 in (1.93 m)
- Listed weight: 190 lb (86 kg)

Career information
- High school: West Valley (Fairbanks, Alaska)
- College: Oregon (2016–2020)
- WNBA draft: 2020: 1st round, 8th overall pick
- Drafted by: Chicago Sky
- Playing career: 2020–2026
- Position: Power forward
- Coaching career: 2023–2024, 2026–present

Career history

Playing
- 2020–2023: Chicago Sky
- 2020–2021: Nesibe Aydın
- 2021–2022: Passalacqua Ragusa
- 2022–2023: Atomerőmű Szekszárd
- 2024-2026: VBW Gdynia

Coaching
- 2023–2024: TCU (assistant)
- 2026–present: TCU (assistant)

Career highlights
- WNBA champion (2021); 2× Katrina McClain Award (2018, 2020); WBCA Coaches' All-American (2020); First-team All-American – AP, USBWA (2020); 4× All-Pac–12 (2017–2020); Pac-12 All-Freshman Team (2017); 3× Alaska Gatorade Player of the Year (2013–2015)
- Stats at WNBA.com
- Stats at Basketball Reference
Medals
3x3 basketball
Representing the United States
Pan American Games
Gold medal – first place	2019 Lima	3x3 tournament
USA Basketball 3x3 National Championship
Gold medal – first place	2019 USA Basketball Women's 3x3	Oregon Ducks
Gold medal – first place	2018 USA Basketball Women's 3x3	Oregon Ducks
Representing United States
Women's basketball
FIBA Under-19 World Cup
Silver medal – second place	2017 Italy	Team
FIBA Under-18 Americas Championship
Gold medal – first place	2016 Chile	Team

Ruth Cecilia Hebard (born April 28, 1998) is an American basketball coach and former professional basketball player who is currently an assistant coach for the TCU Horned Frogs women's basketball program. She played college basketball for the Oregon Ducks. While at West Valley High School in Fairbanks, Alaska, Hebard was a three-time Gatorade State Player of the Year from 2013 to 2015, and two-time USA Today Alaska Player of the Year in 2015 and 2016.

== Career ==
=== College career ===
==== 2016–2017 season ====
As a member of a highly touted freshman class that also included future two-time national player of the year Sabrina Ionescu, Hebard averaged a team-best 14.9 points and 8.5 rebounds per game. On January 15, 2017 against no. 17 UCLA, Hebard recorded a season high 29 points on 11-of-15 shooting. She was named both All-Pac-12 Conference and Pac-12 all freshman in the same year; the 18th player in Pac-12 history to achieve the feat.

==== 2017–2018 season ====
Hebard started 37 of Oregon's 38 games and helped the Ducks advanced to the Elite Eight in the NCAA tournament for the second year in a row. She averaged 17.6 points and a team high 9.0 rebounds per game. On February 9, 2018, Hebard scored a career high 30 points on 13-of-15 shooting and 14 rebounds in a game against Washington. In the same month, she set the NCAA men's and women's record for most consecutive made field goal attempts at 33. She was once again named All-Pac-12.

==== 2018–2019 season ====
Hebard averaged 16.1 points and 9.1 rebounds per game for the season and helped the Ducks to their first ever Final Four in the NCAA tournament. She shot 67% from the floor for the second best shooting efficiency in NCAA, and was perfect in two games where she went 9-of-9 in a win against Air Force and 10-of-10 in a win against Colorado. She was named to the All-Pac-12 team for the third year in a row.

==== 2019–2020 season ====
In a 104–46 rout of Colorado on January 3, 2020, Hebard scored 21 points and became the 12th player in Pac-12 history to surpass the 2,000 career points milestone. She joined Ionescu as the only two active Pac-12 players in the 2,000 club.

=== Professional career ===
==== WNBA ====
In the 2020 WNBA draft, the Chicago Sky selected Hebard with the 8th overall pick.

Hebard announced that she was pregnant and gave birth prior to the 2023 WNBA season. Due to giving birth, Hebard was placed on the Inactive/Pregnancy List to start the season. On July 3, 2023, the Sky activated Hebard and she was placed on the active roster.

==== Overseas career ====
===== Nesibe Aydın =====
After her first WNBA season, Hebard signed to the newly-promoted Nesibe Aydın of the Women's Basketball Super League. Her team finished the regular season in third place. In the playoff they lost against Galatasaray in the semifinal after being defeated 58-70 in the last game of the best-of-five series. Hebard's best match in the regular season was in round 9 against Beşiktaş when she scored 34 points and grabbed 20 rebounds. In the playoffs her best game was the first match of the semifinal against Galatasaray, where she scored 22 points and grabbed 14 rebounds and Nesibe won 71-68.

===== KSC Szekszárd =====
At the summer of 2022, Hebard signed to KSC Szekszárd whom played in the Nemzeti Bajnokság the top tier Hungarian women's basketball leagues, and the EuroLeague. She terminated her contract with the team in mid-February 2023, for personal reasons.

===== VBW Gdynia =====
As of 2025 Hebard plays for VBW Gdynia.

== Coaching career ==
Hebard joined the TCU women's basketball coaching staff in fall 2023. This reunited her with Mark Campbell, the head coach for TCU, who was assistant coach for the Ducks during her time at Oregon. As of the 2026-27 season she is the full time assistant coach for the team.

== Personal life ==
Hebard, who is African American, was born in Chicago. She was adopted by two white parents and grew up in Fairbanks, Alaska. She is the second of three children adopted by John and Dorothy Hebard. She is a Christian and a member of the Fellowship of Christian Athletes.

== Career statistics ==
Legend
GP	Games played	GS	Games started	MPG	Minutes per game	FG%	Field goal percentage
3P%	3-point field goal percentage	FT%	Free throw percentage	RPG	Rebounds per game	APG	Assists per game
SPG	Steals per game	BPG	Blocks per game	TO	Turnovers per game	PPG	Points per game
**Bold**	Career high	*	Led Division I

=== College ===
Year	Team	GP	GS	MPG	FG%	3P%	FT%	RPG	APG	SPG	BPG	TO	PPG
2016–17	Oregon	37	35	27.3	.588	.000	.701	8.5	0.8	1.3	0.5	2.2	14.9
2017–18	Oregon	37	37	30.3	.660	.000	.684	9.0	0.6	1.2	1.6	1.6	17.6
2018–19	Oregon	37	36	28.7	.670	.000	.678	9.1	1.0	0.9	0.8	1.3	16.1
2019–20*	Oregon	33	33	28.7	**.685**	.000	.695	9.6	1.5	1.0	1.1	1.5	17.3
Career		144	141	28.7	.651	.000	.689	9.0	0.9	1.2	1.0	1.7	16.4

* 2020 NCAA tournament canceled due to COVID-19 pandemic

=== WNBA ===
†	Denotes seasons in which Hebard won a WNBA championship

==== Regular season ====
Year	Team	GP	GS	MPG	FG%	3P%	FT%	RPG	APG	SPG	BPG	TO	PPG
2020	Chicago	22	**6**	14.5	**.682**	.000	.750	3.9	0.3	0.5	0.4	0.7	5.7
2021^{†}	Chicago	**30**	**6**	**16.8**	.529	.000	**.794**	**4.4**	**0.8**	**0.7**	**0.7**	0.6	**5.8**
2022	Chicago	24	0	9.7	.510	.000	.750	1.7	0.5	0.3	0.1	0.5	2.3
2023	Chicago	19	0	9.2	.585	.000	.650	2.4	0.4	0.3	0.4	**0.2**	3.9
Career	4 years, 1 team	95	12	13.0	.575	.000	.743	3.2	0.5	0.5	0.4	0.5	4.5

==== Playoffs ====
Year	Team	GP	GS	MPG	FG%	3P%	FT%	RPG	APG	SPG	BPG	TO	PPG
2020	Chicago	1	**1**	**18.0**	.500	.000	.000	**2.0**	0.0	0.0	**1.0**	2.0	**4.0**
2021^{†}	Chicago	**5**	0	3.0	**1.000**	.000	.000	0.2	0.0	0.0	0.0	**0.0**	0.8
2022	Chicago	4	0	4.3	.200	.000	.000	1.3	**0.3**	0.5	0.0	0.3	0.5
2023	Chicago	2	0	7.0	.250	.000	.000	1.0	0.0	**1.0**	0.5	**0.0**	1.0
Career	4 years, 1 team	12	1	5.3	.400	.000	.000	0.8	0.1	0.3	0.2	0.3	1.0

=== Overseas ===
==== National competition ====
===== Regular season =====
Season	Team	League	GP	GS	MPG	FG%	3P%	FT%	RPG	APG	SPG	BPG	TO	PPG
2020–21	Nesibe Aydın	(Turkey) KBSL	**26**	—N/a	**32.1**	.556	.000	.820	**11.8**	**1.7**	**1.6**	**0.7**	2.7	**20.2**
2021–22	Passalacqua Ragusa	(Italy) LBF	7	5	23.1	**.565**	.000	.875	5.6	0.9	0.9	0.3	1.7	13.0
2022–23	Atomerőmű Szekszárd	(Hungary) NB I/A	12	8	23.3	.551	.000	**.906**	7.3	0.8	1.1	0.2	**1.2**	12.4

===== Playoffs =====
Season	Team	League	GP	GS	MPG	FG%	3P%	FT%	RPG	APG	SPG	BPG	TO	PPG
2020–21	Nesibe Aydın	(Turkey) KBSL	**7**	**7**	**31.2**	.457	.000	**.828**	**8.1**	**2.4**	**1.7**	**1.0**	2.0	**14.0**
2021–22	Passalacqua Ragusa	(Italy) LBF	5	5	30.5	**.476**	.000	.737	5.0	1.0	0.8	0.4	2.0	10.8

==== International competition ====
===== Regular season =====
Season	Team	League	GP	GS	MPG	FG%	3P%	FT%	RPG	APG	SPG	BPG	TO	PPG
2022–23	Atomerőmű Szekszárd	EuroLeague	4	3	33.2	.548	.000	1.000	8.8	1.0	0.8	0.3	2.8	13.5
