= Kahleah Copper =

American basketball player (born 1994)

- Copper with the Phoenix Mercury in 2026

No. 2 – Phoenix Mercury
- Position: Shooting guard / small forward
- League: WNBA

Personal information
- Born: August 28, 1994 (age 32) Philadelphia, Pennsylvania, U.S.
- Listed height: 6 ft 1 in (1.85 m)
- Listed weight: 165 lb (75 kg)

Career information
- High school: Prep Charter (Philadelphia, Pennsylvania); Girard College (Philadelphia, Pennsylvania)
- College: Rutgers (2012–2016)
- WNBA draft: 2016: 1st round, 7th overall pick
- Drafted by: Washington Mystics
- Playing career: 2016–present

Career history
- 2016: Washington Mystics
- 2016–2017: BC Castors Braine
- 2017–2023: Chicago Sky
- 2017–2018: Arka Gdynia
- 2018–2019: OGM Ormanspor
- 2019–2020: AZS AJP Gorzów Wielkopolski
- 2020–2021: Elitzur Ramla
- 2021–2022: Perfumerias Avenida
- 2023–2024: Çukurova Basketbol
- 2024–present: Phoenix Mercury
- 2025–present: Rose

Career highlights
- WNBA champion (2021); WNBA Finals MVP (2021); 5× WNBA All-Star (2021-2024, 2026); All-WNBA Second Team (2024); WNBA Three-Point Shootout champion (2023); Unrivaled champion (2025); EuroLeague regular season MVP (2022); All-EuroLeague First Team (2022); First-team All-AAC (2014); Big East All-Freshman Team (2013); McDonald's All-American (2012)
- Stats at WNBA.com
- Stats at Basketball Reference
Medals
Women's basketball
Representing United States
Olympic Games
Gold medal – first place	2024 Paris	Team
World Cup
Gold medal – first place	2022 Australia
Gold medal – first place	2026 Germany

Kahleah Copper (/kəˈliːə/ kə-LEE-ə; born August 28, 1994) is an American professional basketball player for the Phoenix Mercury of the Women's National Basketball Association (WNBA) and for Breeze of Unrivaled. She was drafted with the seventh overall pick by the Washington Mystics in 2016, and was traded to the Chicago Sky the next year.

After three years as a bench player with the Sky, she was elevated to a starting role in 2020. She emerged as a star player in 2021, being named a WNBA All-Star for the first time. Copper led the Chicago Sky during the 2021 playoffs, being named WNBA Finals MVP as the team won their first title in franchise history.

Copper won an Olympic Gold medal at the 2024 Summer Olympics in Paris, France.

== Early life and college ==
Copper is a native of North Philadelphia. She attended and played for Girard College and the Preparatory Charter High School in Philadelphia. As a high school player, she was named to the All-Public League team in Philadelphia, the All-State team in Pennsylvania, and the McDonald's All-American team. She played for the Rutgers Scarlet Knights in college from 2012 to 2016, finishing her college career with the third-most points all time in team history (1,872).

== Professional career ==
=== WNBA ===
==== Washington Mystics (2016) ====
Copper was drafted as the 7th overall pick in the 2016 WNBA draft by the Washington Mystics. She was a bench player in her first season, averaging 16.2 minutes and 6.2 points per game. After the season, she was traded to the Chicago Sky as part of a deal that sent Elena Delle Donne to the Mystics and Stefanie Dolson, Copper, and the 2nd overall pick in the 2017 draft to the Sky.

==== Chicago Sky (2017–2024) ====
In her first three seasons with the Sky, Copper generally came off the bench and averaged 6.7 to 7.1 points per game. In 2020, she was re-signed by the Sky. She was elevated to a starting role in the 2020 season, which was played in a "bubble" due to the COVID-19 pandemic, and led the team in scoring with 14.8 points per game.

Copper continued into her starting role in the 2021 season, and was named as an All-Star for the first time. She averaged 14.4 points per game in the regular season and led the team in scoring in the postseason with 17.7 points per game. Copper led the Sky to their first championship and was named Finals MVP.

In the offseason, the Sky used their one available "core player" designation for Copper, and subsequently signed her to a two-year contract. In the 2022 season, Copper was once again named an All-Star as the Sky returned to the postseason but lost in the semifinals in 5 games.

==== Phoenix Mercury (2024–present) ====
On February 6, 2024, Copper was traded to the Phoenix Mercury alongside the rights to Morgan Bertsch in exchange for Michaela Onyenwere, Brianna Turner, the 2024 No. 3 pick, a 2025 second round pick (from CHI), a 2026 first round pick, and the right to swap 2026 second round. Copper was described by the Associated Press as having been "instrumental" in helping the Mercury qualify for the 2025 WNBA Finals, and she was re-signed by the Mercury in April 2026.

=== Overseas career ===
In the 2021–2022 season Copper played for Perfumerias Avenida in the Spanish League and the Euroleague. She was named the MVP of both leagues.

=== Unrivaled ===
On July 17, 2024, it was announced that Copper would appear and play in the inaugural season of Unrivaled, a new women's 3-on-3 basketball league founded by Napheesa Collier and Breanna Stewart. She plays for Rose BC. Rose won the first ever Unrivaled championship.

== National team career ==
=== 2022 FIBA World Cup ===
In September 2022, Copper was named to the USA international team ahead of the 2022 FIBA World Cup. The team went undefeated in the tournament and won the gold medal.

=== 2024 Summer Olympics ===
In June 2024, Copper was named to the US Olympic team to compete at the 2024 Summer Olympics in France. Copper and the United States defeated France 67–66 in the final, earning Copper her first gold medal and the United States' eighth consecutive gold medal.

== Career statistics ==
Legend
GP	Games played	GS	Games started	MPG	Minutes per game	RPG	Rebounds per game
APG	Assists per game	SPG	Steals per game	BPG	Blocks per game	PPG	Points per game
TO	Turnovers per game	FG%	Field-goal percentage	3P%	3-point field-goal percentage	FT%	Free-throw percentage
**Bold**	Career best	°	League leader

†	Denotes seasons in which Copper won a WNBA championship

=== WNBA ===
==== Regular season ====
Stats current through end of 2025 season

WNBA regular season statistics
Year	Team	GP	GS	MPG	FG%	3P%	FT%	RPG	APG	SPG	BPG	TO	PPG
2016	Washington	30	3	16.2	.417	**.467**	.683	3.1	0.8	0.5	0.1	1.1	6.2
2017	Chicago	34	10	14.3	.465	.294	.830	1.9	0.4	0.3	0.1	**0.8**	6.7
2018	Chicago	33	2	15.9	.397	.375	**.875**	2.2	0.6	0.3	0.2	1.0	7.1
2019	Chicago	34	0	14.8	.387	.306	.771	1.9	0.9	0.4	0.1	1.3	6.7
2020	Chicago	22	22	31.3	**.496**	.344	.737	5.5	2.1	1.0	0.2	2.5	14.9
2021^{†}	Chicago	32	32	30.8	.459	.306	.818	4.2	1.8	0.8	**0.3**	1.9	14.4
2022	Chicago	31	31	28.7	.481	.356	.775	**5.7**	**2.3**	0.5	0.0	2.0	15.7
2023	Chicago	**38**	**38**	31.2	.448	.404	.770	4.4	2.0	0.9	**0.3**	2.5	18.7
2024	Phoenix	37	37	**32.4**	.435	.314	.807	4.5	**2.3**	0.8	0.1	3.0	**21.1**
2025	Phoenix	28	28	26.9	.424	.377	.852	2.9	1.5	**1.1**	0.2	2.2	15.6
**Career**	10 years, 3 teams	319	203	24.1	.444	.353	.793	3.6	1.5	0.6	0.1	1.8	12.8
**Career**	All-Star	4	0	14.3	.514	.308	—	2.0	1.0	0.8	0.0	0.5	10.0

==== Playoffs ====
WNBA playoff statistics
Year	Team	GP	GS	MPG	FG%	3P%	FT%	RPG	APG	SPG	BPG	TO	PPG
2019	Chicago	2	0	16.0	**.545**	**.750**	**1.000**	2.0	1.0	1.5	0.0	**0.5**	9.0
2020	Chicago	1	1	**35.0**	.500	.500	.250	0.0	**4.0**	**2.0**	0.0	2.0	17.0
2021^{†}	Chicago	10	10	32.8	.520	.344	.791	5.3	1.9	1.2	0.2	2.0	17.7
2022	Chicago	8	8	30.5	.452	.346	.795	3.8	0.9	1.6	**0.4**	1.8	16.8
2023	Chicago	2	2	34.5	.406	.455	.750	**7.5**	1.5	0.5	0.0	3.0	**20.0**
2024	Phoenix	2	2	29.5	.407	.364	.600	4.5	2.5	1.0	0.0	3.5	14.5
2025	Phoenix	**11**	**11**	34.2	.465	.316	.909	3.5	0.8	0.4	0.2	1.7	17.8
**Career**	7 years, 2 teams	36	34	31.8	.473	.359	.799	4.1	1.4	1.0	0.2	1.9	17.0

=== College ===
NCAA statistics
Year	Team	GP	Points	FG%	3P%	FT%	RPG	APG	SPG	BPG	PPG
2012-13	Rutgers	30	153	40.7%	0.0%	**71.7%**	3.5	0.5	0.4	0.1	5.1
2013-14	Rutgers	**36**	580	**52.1%**	0.0%	71.0%	6.2	1.4	1.1	0.3	16.1
2014-15	Rutgers	33	538	45.9%	0.0%	70.8%	5.2	1.5	1.2	0.2	16.3
2015-16	Rutgers	34	**601**	49.7%	**38.6%**	67.5%	**8.0**	**1.7**	**1.6**	**0.5**	**17.7**
**Career**		133	1872	48.4%	37.5%	70.1%	5.8	1.3	1.1	0.3	14.1

== Coaching career ==
Between the 2020 and 2021 WNBA seasons, Copper worked as an assistant coach for Purdue University Northwest's women's basketball team.
