= Aleah Goodman =

American basketball player (born 1998)

Washington Huskies
- Position: Associate Head Coach
- League: Big Ten Conference

Personal information
- Born: November 24, 1998 (age 27) Tualatin, Oregon, U.S.
- Listed height: 5 ft 9 in (1.75 m)
- Listed weight: 152 lb (69 kg)

Career information
- High school: La Salle (Milwaukie, Oregon)
- College: Oregon State (2017–2021)
- WNBA draft: 2021: 3rd round, 30th overall pick
- Drafted by: Connecticut Sun

Career history

Playing
- 2021: Connecticut Sun

Coaching
- 2021–2023: Duke (dir. of recruiting and player personnel)
- 2023–2024: Oregon State (assistant)
- 2024–present: Washington (associate head coach)

Career highlights
- All-Pac-12 Team (2021)
- Stats at Basketball Reference

Aleah Goodman (born November 24, 1998) is an American basketball player and coach. She played college basketball for Oregon State from 2017 to 2021 before briefly playing professionally for the Connecticut Sun in the WNBA. She is currently an assistant coach for the Washington Huskies.

== Early life and college ==
Goodman attended La Salle College Prep in Oregon. She was a 2-Time 5A State Champion, as well as a 3-Time Oregon 5A Player of the Year. She ended her high school career with over 1,400 points, 750 assists, 550 rebounds and 375 steals. She was named a 2017 McDonalds All-American participant. She played college basketball at Oregon State. During her senior season, she became the 24th player in program history to pass 1,000 career points. She departed the school as its career leader in three-point shooting percentage and third in made three-pointers. She was also No. 15 in program history with 1,162 career points.

== Professional career ==
Goodman was the 30th pick in the 2021 WNBA draft by the Connecticut Sun. The Sun cut her in training camp in May the same year. She re-joined the team 2 days later as a hardship roster addition. Goodman was released from her hardship contract on May 17 after appearing in one game.

In July 2021, she was hired as the director of recruiting and player personnel for the Duke Blue Devils. In April 2023, she returned to Oregon State as an assistant coach. In June 2024, she was hired as an assistant coach for the Washington Huskies.

== Career statistics ==
=== WNBA ===
Legend
GP	Games played	GS	Games started	MPG	Minutes per game	RPG	Rebounds per game
APG	Assists per game	SPG	Steals per game	BPG	Blocks per game	PPG	Points per game
TO	Turnovers per game	FG%	Field-goal percentage	3P%	3-point field-goal percentage	FT%	Free-throw percentage
**Bold**	Career best	°	League leader

Year	Team	GP	GS	MPG	FG%	3P%	FT%	RPG	APG	SPG	BPG	TO	PPG
2021	Connecticut	1	0	3.0	–	–	–	.0	1.0	.0	.0	.0	.0

=== College ===
Year	Team	GP	GS	MPG	FG%	3P%	FT%	RPG	APG	SPG	BPG	TO	PPG
2017–18	Oregon State	31	0	16.6	43.9	46.2	52.9	1.8	2.1	0.5	**0.3**	**1.3**	6.3
2018–19	Oregon State	**34**	3	25.2	41.0	39.4	**93.5**	2.4	2.6	0.5	0.2	1.4	10.7
2019–20	Oregon State	32	18	29.0	45.4	44.0	74.2	2.4	3.4	0.9	0.2	1.8	8.8
2020–21	Oregon State	20	**20**	**34.9**	**47.9**	**49.0**	85.0	**3.2**	**4.9**	**1.2**	0.2	2.4	**16.2**
**Career**		117	41	25.6	44.4	43.7	82.9	2.4	3.1	0.7	0.2	1.6	9.9
Statistics retrieved from Sports-Reference.
