= 2021 WNBA playoffs =

Professional women's basketball tournament

- Dates: September 23 – October 17, 2021

Final positions
- Champions: Chicago Sky
- Runners-up: Phoenix Mercury

Tournament statistics
- Attendance: 124,535
- Scoring leader (s): Brittney Griner (Phoenix) (21.8 PPG)

Awards
- MVP: Kahleah Copper (Chicago)

The 2021 WNBA playoffs was the postseason tournament of the WNBA's 2021 season. The Chicago Sky won their first WNBA championship.

== Format ==
Following the WNBA regular season, the top eight teams in the overall league standings, without regard to conference alignment, qualified for the playoffs and were seeded from one to eight. Seedings were based strictly on regular-season record. The team with the best record received the #1 seed, the team with the next best record received the #2 seed, and so on. The top two seeds earned double byes (i.e., advanced directly to the semifinals), while the next two seeds received first-round byes.

These seedings were used to create a bracket that determines the matchups throughout the playoffs. The first round of the playoffs consisted of two matchups based on the seedings (5-8 and 6-7). The two winners advanced to the second round with a matchup between the number three seed and the lower of the advancing seeds and another matchup between the number four seed and the other first round winner. The winners of the first two rounds advanced to the semifinals, where the lower-ranked seed of the winners faces the number one seed, with the other remaining team facing the number two seed.

=== Tiebreak procedures ===
1. Better winning percentage among all head-to-head games involving tied teams.
2. Better winning percentage against all teams with .500 or better record at the end of the season.
3. Better point differential in games net result of total points scored less total points allowed head-to-head.
4. Better point differential net result of total points scored less total points allowed against all opponents.
5. Coin toss (or draw of lots, if at least three teams are still tied after the first four tiebreakers fail).

== Broadcast ==
All playoff games were broadcast on the ESPN family of networks, with games being shown on ABC and ESPN2.

== Playoff qualifying ==
Seed	Team	Record	Clinched		
Seed	Team	Record	Playoff berth	Bye to Semis	Top Record
1	Connecticut Sun	26–6	August 24	September 11	September 15
2	Las Vegas Aces	24–8	August 25	September 17	No
3	Minnesota Lynx	22–10	August 31	No	No
4	Seattle Storm	21–11	August 24	No	No
5	Phoenix Mercury	19–13	August 31	No	No
6	Chicago Sky	16–16	September 5	No	No
7	Dallas Wings	14–18	September 11	No	No
8	New York Liberty*^{[note 1]}	12–20	September 19	No	No

^{[note 1]}New York earned the eight seed by virtue of winning the first tiebreaker over Washington and Los Angeles. New York was 3–2 in games between the three teams, while Washington was 3–3 and Los Angeles was 2–3.

With their 12–20 record, the Liberty had the worst regular season winning percentage of any playoff team in WNBA history.

For the fifth straight year, five teams from the Western Conference qualified for the playoffs, while only three from the Eastern Conference qualified. New York returns to the WNBA Playoffs for the first time since 2017, while Dallas returns for the first time since 2018.

== Bracket ==
**First round** single elimination Sept. 23
**5**	**Phoenix Mercury**	**83**
8	New York Liberty	82
**6**	**Chicago Sky**	**81**
7	Dallas Wings	64

**Second round** single elimination Sept. 26
4	Seattle Storm	80
**5**	**Phoenix Mercury**	**85^{OT}**
3	Minnesota Lynx	76
**6**	**Chicago Sky**	**89**

**Semifinals**; Best-of-5; Sept. 28 – Oct. 8
2	Las Vegas Aces	2
**5**	**Phoenix Mercury**	**3**
1	Connecticut Sun	1
**6**	**Chicago Sky**	**3**

**Finals**; Best-of-5; Oct. 10 – 17
5	Phoenix Mercury	1
**6**	**Chicago Sky**	**3**

Note: Teams re-seeded after each round.

- **Bold** – Game or series winner
- Italic – Team with home-court advantage

== First round ==
=== Chicago Sky vs. Dallas Wings ===
The first playoff game of 2021 saw the 6th-seeded Chicago Sky play the 7th-seeded Dallas Wings. Neither team came into the game on a hot streak, with both teams winning two of their last five games. Dallas held the edge in the regular season series, 2–1.

The Sky got off to a hot start and led at halftime by fifteen points. The Wings played well coming out of the break and cut the lead to five at the end of the third quarter. However, the Sky dominated the fourth quarter to win by seventeen points. The Sky ended the game on a 13–1 run. The Sky had four players finish scoring double digit points; Kahleah Copper led the way with 23, while Courtney Vandersloot, Allie Quigley, and Candace Parker contributed 17, 15, and 11 points respectively. Parker also recorded 15 rebounds to finish with a double-double. The Wings only had two players score in double figures, Arike Ogunbowale led the way with 22 while Satou Sabally added 12 points.

ESPN2, SN1

September 23
8:00 p.m. ET

Box score

**#6 Chicago Sky** **81**, #7 Dallas Wings 64
Scoring by quarter: **25**–14, **19**–15, 11–**21**, **26**–14
Pts: Kahleah Copper (23); Rebs: Candace Parker (15); Asts: Candace Parker (7)	Pts: Arike Ogunbowale (22); Rebs: Isabelle Harrison (10); Asts: Moriah Jefferson (4)

Wintrust Arena
Attendance: 4,672
Referees: Michael Price, Jeffrey Smith, Maj Forsberg, Tim Greene

=== Phoenix Mercury vs. New York Liberty ===
In the second game of the first round the 5th-seeded Phoenix Mercury faced off against the 8th-seeded New York Liberty. The Mercury came into the game on a three-game losing streak, after winning ten games in a row after the Olympic break. The Liberty won their last game of the season to end an eight-game losing streak. Phoenix won the regular season series, 2–1.

After a closely contested first quarter, the Liberty edged the second quarter to take a four-point lead into halftime. The Mercury came out of the locker room strong and took a two-point lead into the final quarter. The game went down to the wire, with Brianna Turner making a free-throw with 0.4 seconds remaining to seal the game. The Mercury had four players score double digits: Skylar Diggins-Smith lead with 22 points, Sophie Cunningham made 6 three-pointers on her way to 21 total points, Brittney Griner scored 16, and Turner's 12 rounded out the double-digit scorers. Griner added 10 rebounds to complete a double-double. The Liberty also had four players score double digits: Betnijah Laney led with 25 points, while Natasha Howard, Sabrina Ionescu, and Rebecca Allen added 16, 14, and 11 respectively. Howard added 10 rebounds and Ionescu has 11 assists to complete double doubles.

ESPN2, SN1/NBA TV Canada

September 23
10:00 p.m. ET

Box score

**#5 Phoenix Mercury** **83**, #8 New York Liberty 82
Scoring by quarter: **24**–23, 13–**18**, **23**–17, 23–**24**
Pts: Skylar Diggins-Smith (23); Rebs: Brittney Griner (10); Asts: Brittney Griner (6)	Pts: Betnijah Laney (25); Rebs: Natasha Howard (10); Asts: Sabrina Ionescu (11)

Grand Canyon University Arena
Attendance: 5,827
Referees: Eric Brewton, Amy Bonner, Angelica Suffren, Randy Richardson

== Second round ==
=== Seattle Storm vs. Phoenix Mercury ===
The first game of the second round saw the 4th-seeded Seattle Storm host the 5th-seeded Phoenix Mercury. Seattle came into the game having won three of their final four games in the regular season. Phoenix entered after having won their first-round match-up three days earlier. Seattle was without their star player Breanna Stewart for the game. During the regular season, Seattle won two of the three games the teams played, including a 94–85 win on the final day of the regular season.

The Mercury game out strong, winning the first quarter by seven points. However, the tide changed when they scored only nine points in the second quarter and the Storm took a three-point lead into halftime. The next two periods were tightly contested, with the Mercury winning the third quarter by two points and the fourth by one point. With the game tied after regulation, the game went into overtime, where the Mercury pulled out a five-point victory. The Mercury were led by Brittney Griner, who scored 23 points and had 16 rebounds, while Skylar Diggins-Smith scored 20 points and led the team with 6 assists. Diana Taurasi scored 14 points, while Brianna Turner and Kia Nurse scored 12 each. All five Mercury starters scored in double digits. Only three players came off the bench for the Mercury, and the scored four total points. The Storm had four of their five starters score in double figures, with Katie Lou Samuelson leading the way with 18. Sue Bird scored 16, Jewell Loyd scored 15, and Mercedes Russell scored 10 while recording 12 rebounds. The Storm used four bench players who contributed twelve total points.

ABC, TSN5/NBA TV Canada

September 26
3:00 p.m. ET

Box score

#4 Seattle Storm 80, #5 **Phoenix Mercury** **85** (OT)
Scoring by quarter: 16–**23**, **19**–9, 21–**23**, 17–**18**, Overtime: 7–**12**
Pts: Katie Lou Samuelson (18); Rebs: Mercedes Russell (12); Asts: Sue Bird/Jewell Loyd (5)	Pts: Brittney Griner (23); Rebs: Brittney Griner (16); Asts: Skylar Diggins-Smith (6)

Angel of the Winds Arena
Attendance: 5,375
Referees: Cheryl Flores, Tiara Cruse, Isaac Barnett, Dannica Mosher

=== Minnesota Lynx vs. Chicago Sky ===
In the second game of the Second Round, the 3rd seeded Minnesota Lynx host the 6th seeded Chicago Sky. The Lynx came into the game winning nine of their last ten games, with their only loss coming to the 2nd seeded Las Vegas Aces. The Lynx' only losses after the Olympic break were to teams seeded above them in the playoff standings. The Sky came into the game after their First Round victory over the three days prior. The teams split their regular season series 1–1.

The game started with a closely contested first quarter that the Lynx won by a point. The Sky won the second quarter by five to take a four point lead into halftime. Coming out of the break, the Sky never looked back winning the third quarter by two points and the fourth by seven points to win the game by thirteen. The Sky had five players score in double figures: Courtney Vandersloot led with 19 points, Kahleah Copper added 16 points and 10 rebounds, Azurá Stevens scored 15 points, Diamond DeShields added 14 points from the bench, and Allie Quigley scored 11 points. The Lynx only had three players score in double digits: Aerial Powers led the way with 24 points, Kayla McBride scored 19, and Sylvia Fowles scored 17. The Lynx only scored eight points from their bench, while the Sky scored 20.

ESPN2, TSN5

September 26
5:00 p.m. ET

Box score

#3 Minnesota Lynx 76, #6 **Chicago Sky** **89**
Scoring by quarter: **23**–22, 15–**20**, 18–**20**, 20–**27**
Pts: Aerial Powers (24); Rebs: Sylvia Fowles (8); Asts: Aerial Powers (4)	Pts: Courtney Vandersloot (19); Rebs: Kahleah Copper (10); Asts: Courtney Vandersloot (5)

Target Center
Attendance: 4,334
Referees: Roy Gulbeyan, Billy Smith, Tiffany Bird, Randy Richardson

== Semifinals ==
=== Connecticut Sun vs. Chicago Sky ===
The Connecticut Sun enter the semifinals as the number one seed. The Sun finished the season 13–0 after the Olympic break. The Sun also begin the series on nine days of rest, with their last game of the regular season being on September 19, a 20 point win over the Atlanta Dream. The Sky enter the series coming off two solid playoff wins. A seventeen point victory in the First Round and a thirteen point victory in the Second Round. During the regular season, the teams met three times, with the Sky taking the series 2–1.

Game 1

Game One of the series proved to be a thriller. The Sky started hot, winning the first quarter by three points, but the Sun came back in quarter two and the game went into halftime with the Sky holding a one point advantage. The Sky expanded the lead to three by the end of the third quarter, but the Sun came back and won the fourth quarter by three points to force the game into overtime. The first overtime period ended with both teams scoring seven points, so a second overtime was needed to determine a winner. The Sky dominated the second overtime 10–4 and came out with a road win in Game One. The Sky had four players finish scoring in double figures. Candace Parker was the leading scorer with 22 points, Allie Quigley added 19, Kahleah Copper scored 13, and Courtney Vandersloot rounded out double figure scorers with 12 points. Vandersloot also notched 10 rebounds and 18 assists, to finish with a Triple-double. This was only the second playoff triple double in WNBA history. The Sun had only three players finish in double digits, but they also had three players finish with double digit rebounds. Jonquel Jones lead the team with 26 points and 11 rebounds, while Brionna Jones added 22 points and 10 rebounds, and DeWanna Bonner rounded out the double-doubles with 13 points and 10 rebounds.

ESPN2, SN1

September 28
8:00 p.m.

Box Score

#1 Connecticut Sun 95, **#6 Chicago Sky** **101** (2OT)
Scoring by quarter: 21–**24**, **25**–23, 17–**19**, **21**–18, Overtime: 7–7, 4–**10**
Pts: Jonquel Jones (26); Rebs: Jonquel Jones (11); Asts: Briann January/Jonquel Jones (4)	Pts: Candace Parker (22); Rebs: Courtney Vandersloot (10); Asts: Courtney Vandersloot (18)

Mohegan Sun Arena
Attendance: 4,720
Referees: Roy Gulbeyan, Isaac Barnett, Dannica Mosher

Game 2

Game two of the series started off a tight contest with Chicago winning the first quarter 23–21. However, Connecticut had a strong second quarter where they won 24–16 to take a six point lead into halftime. The Sky had a strong third quarter winning 20–13 and taking a one point lead into the fourth. The Sun shut down the Sky in the final period, winning 21–9 to even the series, with a nine point win. The Sun had five players score in double figures, led by Alyssa Thomas with 15 points. Thomas also added eleven rebounds to complete a double-double. DeWanna Bonner scored 15 points, while Briann January and Jasmine Thomas scored 12 point each. Brionna Jones rounded out the double-digit scorers with 11 points. The Sky had four players score in double digits, led by Kahleah Copper with 13 points. Candace Parker score 12 points, while Courtney Vandersloot and Azurá Stevens both added 10 points. There was a stark difference in rebounding in Game 2, with the Sun out rebounding the Sky 39–26.

ESPN2, SN360

September 30
8:00 p.m.

Box Score

**#1 Connecticut Sun** **79**, #6 Chicago Sky 68
Scoring by quarter: 21–**23**, **24**–16, 13–**20**, **21**–9
Pts: DeWanna Bonner/Alyssa Thomas (15); Rebs: Alyssa Thomas (11); Asts: Alyssa Thomas (6)	Pts: Kahleah Copper (13); Rebs: Candace Parker (7); Asts: Courtney Vandersloot (6)

Mohegan Sun Arena
Attendance: 6,088
Referees: Eric Brewton, Amy Bonner, Billy Smith

Game 3

The series moved to Chicago for games three and four of the series. In their first home game, the Sky got out to a slow start, losing quarter one by four points, 17–21. However, they came back and won quarter two by six points to take a two point lead into halftime. The Sun game out of the half strong and won the third quarter by five points, 28–23. Going into the fourth quarter the Sun held a three point lead. However, the Sky closed the game by winning the fourth quarter by six points and therefore, the game by three. The win leaves the Sky up in the series 2–1 and needing just one more win to advance to the finals. The Sky had four players score in double digits, led by Kahleah Copper with 26 points. Allie Quigley added 21 points, Azurá Stevens scored 15 points, and Candace Parker rounded out the double digit scorers with 10 points. Both Stevens and Parker recorded double-doubles by recording 11 and 10 rebounds respectively. The Sun also had four players score in double digits and were led by DeWanna Bonner with 22 points. Alyssa Thomas scored 18 points of the bench, Briann January scored 11 points and Jonquel Jones scored 10 points. Jones had a double-double for the game by way of recording 10 rebounds.

ESPN, TSN2

October 3
1:00 p.m.

Box Score

**#6 Chicago Sky** **86**, #1 Connecticut Sun 83
Scoring by quarter: 17–**21**, **20**–14, 23–**28**, **26**–20
Pts: Kahleah Copper (26); Rebs: Azurá Stevens (11); Asts: Courtney Vandersloot (13)	Pts: DeWanna Bonner (22); Rebs: Jonquel Jones (10); Asts: Jasmine Thomas (6)

Wintrust Arena
Attendance: 7,421
Referees: Cheryl Flores, Tiara Cruse, Isaac Barnett, Randy Richardson

Game 4

Looking to close out the series, the Sky started the game well, winning the first quarter by eight points, 32–26. They carried their momentum into the second quarter, winning by seven points, 22–15. The Sun worked on chipping away at the Sky's thirteen point halftime lead during the third quarter, which ended 17–11 in favor of the Sun. The seven point lead that the Sky carried into the fourth quarter proved to be more than enough as the Sky won the fourth quarter by three points, 14–11. The Sky won the series 3–1 and qualified for their first Finals since 2014. The Sky had four players score in double figures, led by Courtney Vandersloot with 19 points. Kahleah Copper contributed 18 points, Candace Parker scored 17, and Azurá Stevens rounded out the double digit scorers with 11 points. The Sun had three players score in double figures, led by Jonquel Jones who scored 25 points. Jones also added 11 rebounds to complete a double-double. Other double digit scorers were Natisha Hiedeman who scored 16 off the bench and Jasmine Thomas with 11 points.

ESPN, TSN4

October 6
8:00 p.m.

Box Score

#6 **Chicago Sky** **79**, #1 Connecticut Sun 69
Scoring by quarter: **32**–26, **22**–15, 11–**17**, **14**–11
Pts: Courtney Vandersloot (19); Rebs: Candace Parker (9); Asts: Candace Parker (7)	Pts: Jonquel Jones (25); Rebs: Jonquel Jones (11); Asts: Alyssa Thomas (4)

Wintrust Arena
Referees: Michael Price, Maj Forsberg, Tim Greene, Billy Smith

=== Las Vegas Aces vs. Phoenix Mercury ===
The Las Vegas Aces entered the series as the number two seed after finishing the season with a 9–2 mark after the Olympic break. Their only two losses during that time were to fellow Semifinalists Connecticut and Chicago. They had nine days of rest before the first game of the series, as their last regular season game was on September 19. The Mercury entered coming off two playoff victories: a one-point game in the First Round and an overtime clash in the Second Round. During the regular season, the Aces won two out of three games. The away team won each of their three meetings during the regular season.

Game 1

Game one was a high-scoring affair that saw the Mercury take a quick nine-point lead after the first quarter of play. However, Las Vegas came back with a strong second quarter, which they won by twelve points, to take a three-point lead into halftime. They expanded on that lead in the third quarter, winning by seven points. The Mercury won the last quarter by four points, but it was not enough to overcome the deficit and the Aces won the game by six points. The Aces had four players score in double digits, led by Riquna Williams with 26 points. Kelsey Plum added 25 points, Chelsea Gray scored 17 and added 12 assists to complete a double-double and A'ja Wilson rounded out the double digit scorers with 15 points. The Mercury had all five starters score in double figures, led by Brittney Griner with 24 points. Diana Taurasi added 20 points, Kia Nurse scored 13, Brianna Turner scored 12 and Skylar Diggins-Smith scored 10 points.

ESPN2, SN1/NBA TV Canada

September 28
10:00 p.m.

Box score

**#2 Las Vegas Aces** **96**, #5 Phoenix Mercury 90
Scoring by quarter: 21–**30**, **31**–19, **24**–17, 20–**24**
Pts: Riquna Williams (26); Rebs: A'ja Wilson (9); Asts: Chelsea Gray (12)	Pts: Brittney Griner (24); Rebs: Brianna Turner (8); Asts: Brittney Griner/Diana Taurasi (6)

Michelob Ultra Arena
Attendance: 7,009
Referees: Michael Price, Angelica Suffren, Tim Greene, Cheryl Flores

Game 2

The Mercury got off to a hot start in Game 2 of the series, winning the first quarter by seventeen points, 37–20. The high scoring nature of the game continued into the second quarter, with the Aces taking the period by a score of 32–31. The Mercury took a sixteen-point advantage into halftime. Coming out of the break, they built on that advantage, winning the third quarter by four points, 30–26. Both teams cooled off some in the fourth quarter, but the Mercury still won that period by six points, 19–13. The Mercury posted a dominating 26-point win to tie the series at one game apiece. The Mercury had five players score in double digits, led by Diana Taurasi, who scored a playoff career-high 37 points. Brittney Griner added 25, Skylar Diggins-Smith notched 17, while Kia Nurse and Shey Peddy both contributed 11 points. Only seven players scored points for the Aces, but six of the scored in double digits. Kelsey Plum led the team with 25 points, Riquna Williams scored 17, Liz Cambage added 13, A'ja Wilson scored 12, and Jackie Young and Chelsea Gray rounded out the double digit scorers with 10 points each.

ESPN2, TSN5/NBA TV Canada

September 30
10:00 p.m.

Box score

#2 Las Vegas Aces 91, **#5 Phoenix Mercury** **117**
Scoring by quarter: 20–**37**, **32**–31, 26–**30**, 13–**19**
Pts: Kelsey Plum (25); Rebs: A'ja Wilson (9); Asts: Chelsea Gray/A'ja Wilson (7)	Pts: Diana Taurasi (37); Rebs: Brianna Turner (8); Asts: Brittney Griner/Skylar Diggins-Smith/Kia Vaughn (5)

Michelob Ultra Arena
Attendance: 6,432
Referees: Angelica Suffren, Maj Forsberg, Tiara Cruse, Isaac Barnett

Game 3

The series moved to Phoenix for games three and four. The Mercury made the most of home court advantage by coming out strong in Game 3. They won the first quarter by seven points, 26–19. Their momentum carried into the second quarter where they won by eight points, 20–12. The Mercury's fifteen point lead proved insurmountable for the Aces. The Mercury continued to win both the third quarter and the fourth quarter to finish off a dominating twenty eight-point win. Their win meant they only needed one more win to reach the Finals. The Mercury had three players score in double figures, led by Brianna Turner with 23 points. Brittney Griner added 18 points and the double-digit scorers were rounded out by Shey Peddy, who added 10 off the bench. Turner and Griner added 17 and 11 rebounds, respectively, to both record double-doubles. The Aces had only two players score in double figures with Liz Cambage scoring 13 and Dearica Hamby added 10 off the bench. The Mercury also had a wide margin in rebounding, winning the battle on the glass, 58–29.

ABC, TSN2

October 3
3:00 p.m.

Box score

**#5 Phoenix Mercury** **87**, #2 Las Vegas Aces 60
Scoring by quarter: **26**–19, **20**–12, **26**–21, **15**–8
Pts: Brianna Turner (23); Rebs: Brianna Turner (17); Asts: Skylar Diggins-Smith (9)	Pts: Liz Cambage (13); Rebs: Dearica Hamby (7); Asts: Jackie Young (3)

Desert Financial Arena
Attendance: 7,090
Referees: Roy Gulbeyan, Amy Bonner, Billy Smith, Tiffany Bird

Game 4

Facing elimination, the Aces started slowly losing the first quarter by five points, 29–24. However, they managed to turn the tide in the second quarter, winning by eight points, 25–17. The Aces took a three-point lead into halftime. They stormed out of the half and won the third quarter by eighteen points, 29–11. The large lead proved insurmountable for the Mercury. However, they put up an effort winning the fourth quarter by four points. The Aces' seventeen point win forced a fifth game in the series. The Aces had four players score in double figures and were led by Chelsea Gray with 22 points. Kelsey Plum added 20 points off the bench, Riquna Williams scored 17 points, and A'ja Wilson tallied 15 points. Wilson also collected 12 rebounds to complete a double-double. The Mercury also had four players score in double figures. Skylar Diggins-Smith and Diana Taurasi led the way with 14 points, Brittney Griner and Shey Peddy both scored 13.

ESPN, TSN4

October 6
10:00 p.m.

Box score

#5 Phoenix Mercury 76, #2 **Las Vegas Aces** **93**
Scoring by quarter: **29**–24, 17–**25**, 11–**29**, **19**–15
Pts: Diana Taurasi/Skylar Diggins-Smith (14); Rebs: Brittney Griner (8); Asts: Diana Taurasi/Brianna Turner (4)	Pts: Chelsea Gray (22); Rebs: A'ja Wilson (12); Asts: Chelsea Gray/Kelsey Plum (6)

Footprint Center
Attendance: 11,255
Referees: Eric Brewton, Tiara Cruse, Isaac Barnett, Randy Richardson

Game 5

The deciding game of the series started off with the visiting team, Phoenix, winning the first quarter by six points, 20–14. Behind a home crowd of over 9,500 fans, the Aces came back in the second quarter and won by four points, 28–24. The Mercury took a two-point lead into the halftime break. The Aces came out of the break strong and won the third quarter by ten points, 24–14, and took an eight-point lead into the final period of play. The Mercury caught fire in the fourth and won the quarter by eleven points, 29–18. The Aces' eight-point lead turned into a three-point deficit and they could not convert in the final minutes and were eliminated from the playoffs. The Mercury won the series, 3 games to 2, and advanced to the Finals. The Mercury had four players score in double digits and were led by Brittney Griner with 28 points. Diana Taurasi added 24, Shey Peddy scored 15, and Skylar Diggins-Smith contributed 14 points. The Aces also had four players score in double digits and were led by Kelsey Plum and Chelsea Gray with 22 points. A'ja Wilson was not far behind with 21 points and Wilson completed her double-double with 10 rebounds. Liz Cambage also contributed a double-double with 10 points and 11 rebounds.

ESPN2, TSN4

October 8
9:00 p.m.

Box score

#2 Las Vegas Aces 84, **#5 Phoenix Mercury** **87**
Scoring by quarter: 14–**20**, **28**–24, **24**–14, 18–**29**
Pts: Chelsea Gray/Kelsey Plum (22); Rebs: Liz Cambage (11); Asts: Chelsea Gray (6)	Pts: Brittney Griner (28); Rebs: Brianna Turner (11); Asts: Skylar Diggins-Smith (8)

Michelob Ultra Arena
Attendance: 9,680
Referees: Maj Forsberg, Tim Greene, Billy Smith, Cheryl Flores

== WNBA Finals ==
=== Phoenix Mercury vs. Chicago Sky ===
Game 1

ABC, SN/NBA TV Canada

October 10
3:00 p.m. EDT

Box Score

#5 Phoenix Mercury 77, **#6 Chicago Sky** **91**
Scoring by quarter: **25**–20, 10–**26**, 26–**28**, 16–**17**
Pts: Brittney Griner (20); Rebs: Brianna Turner (9); Asts: Skylar Diggins-Smith (4)	Pts: Kahleah Copper (21); Rebs: Kahleah Copper (10); Asts: Courtney Vandersloot (11)

Footprint Center
Attendance: 10,191
Referees: Eric Brewton, Cheryl Flores, Isaac Barnett, Tiffany Bird

Game 2

ESPN, TSN2

October 13
9:00 p.m. EDT

Box Score

**#5 Phoenix Mercury** **91**, #6 Chicago Sky 86 (OT)
Scoring by quarter: 20–**26**, **20**–14, 17–**23**, **22**–16, Overtime: **12**–7
Pts: Brittney Griner (29); Rebs: Brianna Turner/Brittney Griner (9); Asts: Skylar Diggins-Smith (12)	Pts: Courtney Vandersloot (20); Rebs: Kahleah Copper/Candace Parker/Azurá Stevens (9); Asts: Courtney Vandersloot (14)

Footprint Center
Attendance: 13,685
Referees: Roy Gulbeyan, Tim Greene, Tiffnay Bird, Tiara Cruse

Game 3

ESPN2, TSN2

October 15
9:00 p.m. EDT

Box Score

#6 **Chicago Sky** **86**, #5 Phoenix Mercury 50
Scoring by quarter: **20**–11, **26**–13, **16**–14, **24**–12
Pts: Kahleah Copper (22); Rebs: Azurá Stevens (6); Asts: Courtney Vandersloot (10)	Pts: Brittney Griner (16); Rebs: Brianna Turner (7); Asts: Skylar Diggins-Smith (3)

Wintrust Arena
Attendance: 10,378
Referees: Michael Price, Billy Smith, Maj Forsberg, Isaac Barnett

Game 4

ESPN, SN/NBA TV Canada

October 17
3:00 p.m. EDT

Box Score

**#6 Chicago Sky** **80**, #5 Phoenix Mercury 74
Scoring by quarter: 25–**28**, 12–**16**, 17–**19**, **26**–11
Pts: Allie Quigley (26); Rebs: Candace Parker (13); Asts: Courtney Vandersloot (15)	Pts: Brittney Griner (28); Rebs: Brianna Turner (12); Asts: Skylar Diggins-Smith (8)

Wintrust Arena
Attendance: 10,378
Referees: Roy Gulbeyan, Eric Brewton, Tiara Cruse, Isaac Barnett
