= Diamond DeShields =

American basketball player (born 1995)

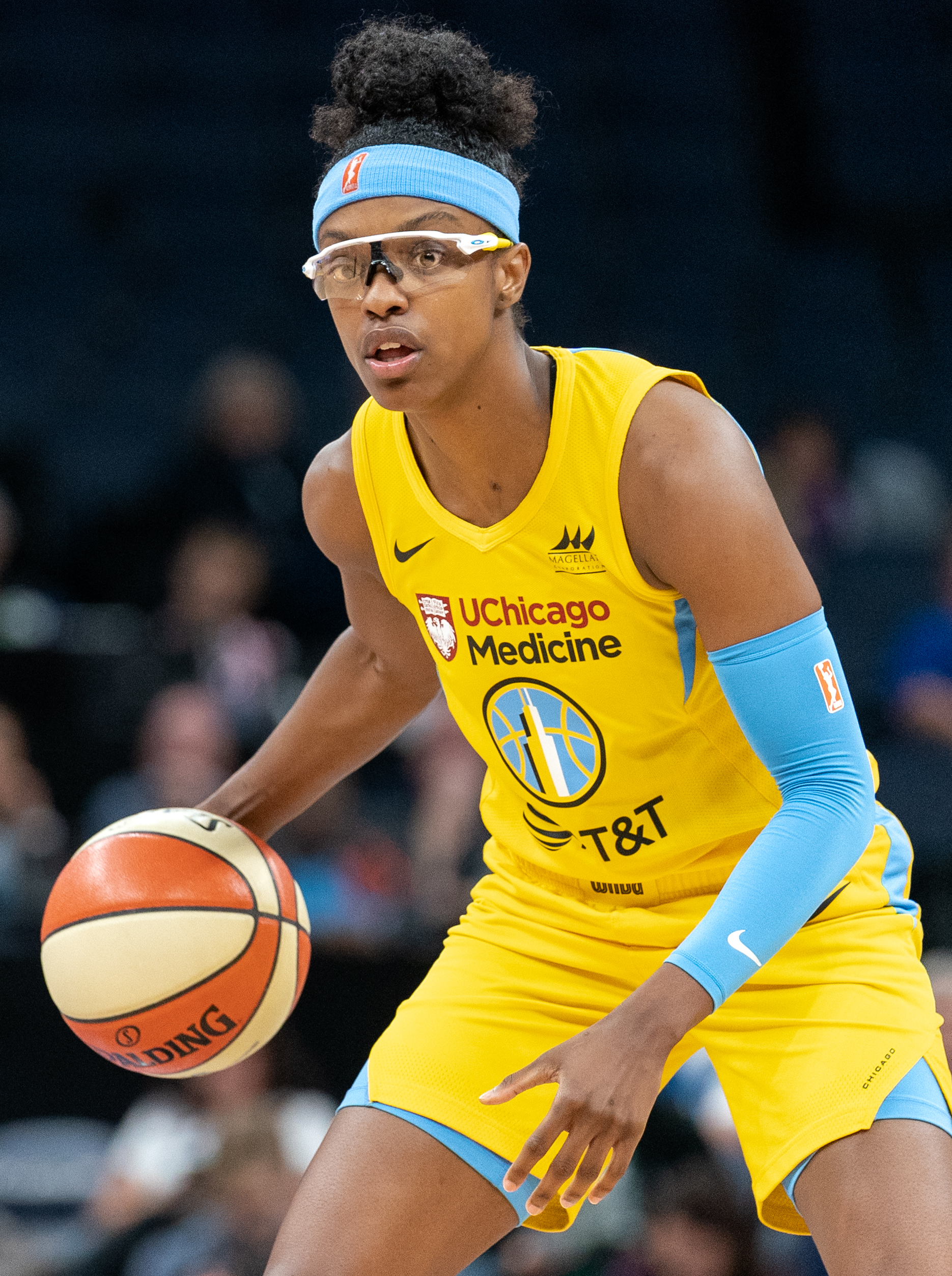
- DeShields with the Chicago Sky in 2019

Free agent
- Position: Shooting guard

Personal information
- Born: March 5, 1995 (age 31) West Palm Beach, Florida, U.S.
- Listed height: 6 ft 1 in (1.85 m)
- Listed weight: 172 lb (78 kg)

Career information
- High school: Norcross (Norcross, Georgia)
- College: North Carolina (2013–2014); Tennessee (2015–2017)
- WNBA draft: 2018: 1st round, 3rd overall pick
- Drafted by: Chicago Sky
- Playing career: 2017–present

Career history
- 2017–2018: Çukurova Basketbol
- 2018–2021: Chicago Sky
- 2022: Phoenix Mercury
- 2023: Dallas Wings
- 2024: Chicago Sky

Career highlights
- WNBA champion (2021); WNBA All-Rookie Team (2018); WNBA All-Star (2019); WNBA Skills Challenge Champion (2019); All-WNBA Second Team (2019); First-team All-SEC (2017); First-team All-ACC (2014); USBWA National Freshman of the Year (2014); ACC Rookie of the Year (2014); ACC All-Freshman Team (2014); Naismith Prep Player of the Year (2013); McDonald's All-American (2013); MaxPreps National Player of the Year (2013); Miss Georgia Basketball (2013); FIBA Under-17 Women's World Cup MVP (2012)
- Stats at WNBA.com
- Stats at Basketball Reference
Medals
Women's basketball
Representing United States
FIBA AmeriCup
Gold medal – first place	2019 Puerto Rico	Team
2015 Summer Universiade
Gold medal – first place	2015 Gwangju	Team
FIBA Under-17 World Cup
Gold medal – first place	2012 Netherlands	Team
FIBA Under-19 World Cup
Gold medal – first place	2011 Chile	Team
FIBA Under-18 Americas Championship
Gold medal – first place	2010 United States	Team
Women's 3x3 basketball
Representing the United States
FIBA 3x3 Under-18 World Cup
Gold medal – first place	2012 Spain	Team

Diamond Danae-Aziza DeShields (born March 5, 1995) is an American professional basketball player who last played for Chicago Sky of the Women's National Basketball Association (WNBA). She was drafted in third overall pick in the 2018 WNBA draft, and won a championship with the Sky in 2021. She is the daughter of former MLB player Delino DeShields and the younger sister of MLB player Delino DeShields Jr.

== College career ==
DeShields graduated from Norcross High School in Norcross, Georgia. Playing for the school's basketball team, she was a part of three state champions and averaged 26 points per game in her senior year. DeShields enrolled at the University of North Carolina at Chapel Hill, where she played guard for the North Carolina Tar Heels women's basketball team in her freshman year of college. She set an Atlantic Coast Conference record for points scored by a freshman with 648. After her freshman year, DeShields transferred University of Tennessee, where she played for the Tennessee Lady Volunteers basketball team for two years after sitting out for the season after her transfer. In the 2016-17 season, DeShields led the Lady Vols with 17.4 points per game and was chosen to the All-Southeastern Conference's first team.

== Professional career ==
=== European leagues ===
Though DeShields graduated with her bachelor's degree after her second season at Tennessee, she retained a year of eligibility for college basketball. After initially announcing she would return for the 2017-18 season, she opted to leave Tennessee to play professionally in Turkey. DeShields signed with Çukurova Basketbol of the Turkish Super League, where she averaged 17.4 points, 6.4 rebounds, and 3.8 assists per game.

=== WNBA ===
==== Chicago Sky (2018–2021) ====
DeShields was drafted by the Chicago Sky with the third pick of the 2018 WNBA draft. In her first season in the WNBA, she averaged 14.4 points per game while starting in 33 of 34 games played. She was named to the All-Rookie Team.

In 2019, her sophomore season, DeShields was named a WNBA All-Star. During the All-Star Weekend, she won the Skills Challenge, beating out Jonquel Jones in the final round. DeShields started all 34 games and averaged 16.2 points per game. On September 11, 2019, she played in her first career postseason game and scored 25 points, as the Chicago Sky defeated the Phoenix Mercury 105–76. It was the fifth-most points scored by a WNBA player in a postseason debut in league history. DeShields scored 23 points in the Sky's loss to the Las Vegas Aces in the second round of the playoffs.

In December 2019, while playing overseas in Turkey, DeShields suffered a back injury. An MRI following the injury revealed that she had a tumor (a lumbar spinal schwannoma) in her spine, which posed a serious risk of permanent paralysis. After surgery to remove the tumor, DeShields suffered tremors and involuntary spasms and spent months rehabilitating without certainty about whether she would be able to return to play. She decided to keep her condition and surgery experiences private, until sharing them in an interview in May 2022.

DeShields returned to play in the 2020 season, which was held in a bubble environment due to the COVID-19 pandemic. She did not start games, as she was recovering from a knee injury, and played in 13 games while averaging 6.8 points in 17.2 minutes per game. DeShields suffered an apparent quadriceps injury in a game on August 21, and left the bubble a week later, missing the remainder of the season and the Sky's single postseason game.

In the 2021 season, DeShields began as a starter and averaged 26.9 minutes and 11.3 points per game. Near the end of the season, she shifted to a role coming off the bench. The Sky entered the playoffs as the sixth seed, and made their way to the 2021 WNBA Finals, winning the series in four games against the Phoenix Mercury. DeShields recorded 15.7 minutes and 5.5 points per game in the team's playoff run.

In the offseason, DeShields expressed admiration for the Sky along with a preference to play for a team where she would return to a starting role.

==== Phoenix Mercury (2022) ====
As a free agent entering the 2022 season, DeShields took meetings with several teams across the league. On February 3, 2022, she was traded to the Phoenix Mercury in a three-team sign-and-trade deal involving the Sky and the Indiana Fever. She started 19 of 30 regular season games and both postseason games for the Mercury in the 2022 season, averaging 13.1 points in the regular season and 19.5 points per game in the postseason.

==== Dallas Wings (2023) ====
On February 11, 2023 DeShields was traded to the Dallas Wings in a four-team trade involving the New York Liberty, Phoenix Mercury, Dallas Wings and Chicago Sky. She missed the 2023 season and postseason with a knee injury.

==== Chicago Sky (2024) ====
On February 5, 2024, DeShields signed a one-year deal to return to the Chicago Sky, three seasons after her original departure.

==== Connecticut Sun (2025) ====
On February 3, 2025, DeShields signed a one-year deal with the Connecticut Sun. She suffered an ankle injury in training camp and on May 15, 2025, she was waived by the Sun.

Towards the end of the 2025 regular season, DeShields was featured — along with Haley Jones, Julie Vanloo, Harmoni Turner, and Shyanne Sellers — in an ESPN article on life on the WNBA fringe given the league's limit of only 12 roster spots per team.

== Career statistics ==
Legend
GP	Games played	GS	Games started	MPG	Minutes per game	RPG	Rebounds per game
APG	Assists per game	SPG	Steals per game	BPG	Blocks per game	PPG	Points per game
TO	Turnovers per game	FG%	Field-goal percentage	3P%	3-point field-goal percentage	FT%	Free-throw percentage
**Bold**	Career best	°	League leader

†	Denotes seasons in which DeShields won a WNBA championship

=== WNBA ===
==== Regular season ====
Stats current through end of 2024 regular season

WNBA regular season statistics
Year	Team	GP	GS	MPG	FG%	3P%	FT%	RPG	APG	SPG	BPG	TO	PPG
2018	Chicago	**34**	33	28.4	.425	**.328**	**.836**	4.9	2.2	1.1	0.3	2.1	14.4
2019	Chicago	**34**	**34**	**30.2**	.399	.316	**.836**	**5.5**	**2.4**	**1.3**	0.4	2.2	**16.2**
2020	Chicago	13	0	17.2	**.434**	.167	.778	1.8	1.5	0.9	0.1	2.3	6.8
2021^{†}	Chicago	32	22	26.9	.393	.300	.820	3.5	2.3	1.2	0.4	1.9	11.3
2022	Phoenix	30	19	25.3	.388	.236	.765	3.8	2.2	1.0	**0.5**	2.3	13.1
2023	Did not play (due to injury)												
2024	Chicago	32	10	13.8	.348	.173	.611	1.4	1.3	0.6	0.3	**0.9**	4.5
**Career**	6 years, 2 teams	175	118	24.5	.398	.283	.802	3.7	2.1	1.0	0.3	1.9	11.6
**Career**	All-Star	1	0	15.9	.545	.333	—	5.0	4.0	1.0	0.0	1.0	13.0

==== Playoffs ====
WNBA playoff statistics
Year	Team	GP	GS	MPG	FG%	3P%	FT%	RPG	APG	SPG	BPG	TO	PPG
2019	Chicago	2	**2**	**33.0**	**.436**	**.333**	**.833**	**5.0**	**2.0**	0.5	**1.0**	**0.5**	**24.0**°
2021^{†}	Chicago	**10**	0	15.7	.340	.250	.800	2.7	1.1	**1.1**	0.1	1.6	5.5
2022	Phoenix	2	**2**	27.0	.432	**.333**	.714	4.5	**2.0**	1.0	0.0	3.5	19.5
**Career**	3 years, 2 teams	14	4	19.8	.395	.300	.795	3.3	1.4	1.0	0.2	1.7	10.1

=== College ===
NCAA statistics
Year	Team	GP	GS	MPG	FG%	3P%	FT%	RPG	APG	SPG	BPG	TO	PPG
2013–14	North Carolina	**36**	**31**	27.9	**.426**	.279	.776	5.4	2.6	**1.7**	0.3	3.4	**18.0**
2014–15	Tennessee	Did not play due to NCAA transfer rules											
2015–16	Tennessee	**36**	20	26.8	.391	.248	.765	5.2	2.3	1.6	0.8	**3.2**	14.3
2016–17	Tennessee	29	28	**33.5**	.423	**.333**	**.791**	**6.4**	**3.8**	1.4	**1.0**	3.6	17.4
**Career**		101	79	29.1	.413	.279	.779	5.6	2.8	1.6	0.7	3.4	16.5

== Personal life ==
DeShields' father, Delino DeShields, and brother, Delino DeShields Jr., have played in Major League Baseball. Her mother, Tisha, was named an All-American heptathlete while attending Tennessee. DeShields has a paternal half-brother and two paternal half-sisters. Her younger sister, Denim, plays college basketball for the Ole Miss Rebels.
