= 2021 Chicago Sky season =

- WNBA champions
- Head coach: James Wade
- Arena: Wintrust Arena

Results
- Record: 16–16 (.500)
- Place: 2nd (Eastern)
- Playoff finish: WNBA Champions (Defeated Phoenix Mercury 3–1 in WNBA Finals)

The 2021 Chicago Sky season was the franchise's 16th season in the Women's National Basketball Association (WNBA) and its third season under head coach James Wade. In the postseason, the Sky won their first WNBA championship.

The offseason was marked by two-time WNBA MVP Candace Parker joining the team. The Sky started the season with two wins but followed with a seven-game losing streak through mid-June. However, they went on a seven-game winning streak that included back-to-back wins over eventual top seed Connecticut. They entered the mid-season Olympic break with a 10–10 record. After the break, they recorded a 4–3 record in August, including back-to-back road wins in Seattle. In September, they began with a road loss and closed out the season with a four game home-stand that they split 2–2, finishing the season 16–16.

The Sky entered the playoffs as the sixth seed. They hosted the Dallas Wings in the First Round, and won in dominating fashion, 81–64. They faced the Minnesota Lynx on the road in the Second Round, winning the game 89–76. Facing the first-seeded Connecticut Sun in a best-of-three semifinals series, they won the Game 1 in double overtime but lost Game 2 on the road. The series returned home to Chicago, where the Sky won both games to win the series 3–1.

The Sky reached the Finals for the first time since 2014. They were only the third team to reach the finals with a record of .500 or below, and the lowest seed to do so since the new playoff format was introduced in 2016. In the WNBA Finals, the Sky defeated the Phoenix Mercury in four games to win their first WNBA championship. Their only loss came in overtime in Game 2.

== Transactions ==
=== WNBA draft ===
The Sky made the following selections in the 2021 WNBA draft on December 4, 2020.

Round	Pick	Player	Nationality	School/Team/Country
1	8	Shyla Heal	Australia	Townsville Fire (Australia)
2	16	Natasha Mack	United States	Oklahoma State

=== Trades and Roster Changes ===
Date	Trade or Roster Change
January 7, 2021	Waived F Kiah Gillespie
January 9, 2021	Full-Season suspend G María Conde
January 13, 2021	Extended Qualifying Offer to F Alexis Prince
February 1, 2021	Signed F Candace Parker
February 9, 2021	Acquired the 16th Pick in the 2021 WNBA draft from Dallas in exchange for Chicago's Second Round Pick in the 2022 WNBA draft.
February 9, 2021	Signed G Brittany Boyd-Jones to a training camp contract
February 17, 2021	Signed F Azurá Stevens to a Contract Extension
March 7, 2021	Waived F Stephanie Mavunga
March 8, 2021	Signed F Astou Ndour
April 13, 2021	Signed F Alexis Prince and G Jessica January to Training Camp Contracts
April 17, 2021	Signed G Shyla Heal, G Petra Holešínská, F Natasha Mack, F Sierra Campisano, and G Sparkle Taylor
April 20, 2021	Signed G Lexie Brown
May 6, 2021	Full-Seasons Suspended F Gabby Williams
May 7, 2021	Waived G Petra Holešínská
May 9, 2021	Traded Gabby Williams to Los Angeles in exchange for Stephanie Watts and the rights to Leonie Fiebich
May 10, 2021	Waived G Jessica January, G Sparkle Taylor, and F Sierra Campisano
May 13, 2021	Waived G Brittany Boyd-Jones, G Lexie Brown, F Alexis Prince and F Natasha Mack, and F Kobi Thornton
May 13, 2021	Temporarily Suspend G Shyla Heal
May 15, 2021	Signed G Brittany Boyd-Jones to Hardship Contract
May 17, 2021	Temporarily Suspend C Stefanie Dolson
May 18, 2021	Signed F Natasha Mack to Hardship Contract
May 20, 2021	Released G Brittany Boyd from Hardship Contract
May 21, 2021	Activated G Shyla Heal from Temporarily Suspension List
May 22, 2021	Released F Natasha Mack from Hardship Contract
May 23, 2021	Signed F Natasha Mack to Hardship Contract
May 30, 2021	Released F Natasha Mack from Hardship Contract
June 1, 2021	Signed G Lexie Brown to Hardship Contract
June 2, 2021	Traded G Shyla Heal, a 2022 3rd Round Pick, and the option to swap 1st Round Picks in 2022 to the Dallas Wings in exchange for G Dana Evans
June 2, 2021	Waived G Stephanie Watts
June 2, 2021	Activate C Stefanie Dolson from Temporary Suspension List
June 2, 2021	Released G Lexie Brown from Hardship Contract
June 7, 2021	Signed F Sierra Campisano
June 8, 2021	Waived F Sierra Campisano
June 8, 2021	Temporarily Suspend F Astou Ndour due to Overseas Commitments
June 9, 2021	Signed F Natasha Mack
June 10, 2021	Waived F Natasha Mack
June 14, 2021	Signed G Lexie Brown
June 30, 2021	Activate F Astou Ndour from Temporary Suspension

== Roster ==
2021 Chicago Sky roster
Players
Coaches

Pos.	No.	Nat.	Name	Height	Weight	DOB	From	Yrs
G	7	(United States)	Brown, Lexie	5' 9" (1.75m)	162 lb (73kg)	1994-10-27	Duke	3
G/F	2	(United States)	Copper, Kahleah	6' 1" (1.85m)	165 lb (75kg)	1994-08-28	Rutgers	5
G	1	(United States)	DeShields, Diamond	6' 1" (1.85m)	172 lb (78kg)	1995-03-05	Tennessee	3
C	31	(United States)	Dolson, Stefanie	6' 5" (1.96m)	235 lb (107kg)	1992-01-08	Connecticut	7
G	11	(United States)	Evans, Dana	5' 6" (1.68m)	145 lb (66kg)	1998-08-01	Louisville	R
F	24	(United States)	Hebard, Ruthy	6' 4" (1.93m)	190 lb (86kg)	1998-04-28	Oregon	1
F/C	45	(Spain)	Ndour, Astou	6' 5" (1.96m)	162 lb (73kg)	1994-08-22	Spain	5
F/C	3	(United States)	Parker, Candace	6' 4" (1.93m)	184 lb (83kg)	1986-04-19	Tennessee	12
G	14	(Hungary)	Quigley, Allie	5' 10" (1.78m)	142 lb (64kg)	1986-06-20	DePaul	12
F/C	30	(United States)	Stevens, Azurá	6' 6" (1.98m)	180 lb (82kg)	1996-02-01	Connecticut	3
G	22	(Hungary)	Vandersloot, Courtney	5' 8" (1.73m)	137 lb (62kg)	1989-02-08	Gonzaga	10

Head coach
(United States) James Wade (Kennesaw State)
Assistant coaches
(United States) Tonya Edwards (Tennessee)
(Germany) Olaf Lange
(Turkey) Emre Vatansever
Athletic trainer
(United States) Meghan Lockerby
Strength and conditioning coach
(United States) Ann Crosby (Western Michigan)

Legend

- (C) Team captain
- (DP) Unsigned draft pick
- (FA) Free agent
- (S) Suspended
- Injured

== Game log ==
=== Preseason ===
2021 pre-season game log
May: 1–1 (Home: 1–0; Road: 0–1)

Game	Date	Team	Score	High points	High rebounds	High assists	Location Attendance	Record
1	May 9	@ Indiana	L 65–82	Kahleah Copper (14)	Boyd-Jones; Mack (6)	Brittany Boyd-Jones (3)	Bankers Life Fieldhouse; No Fans	0–1
2	May 11	Indiana	W 83–70	Astou Ndour-Fall (13)	Candace Parker (6)	Brittany Boyd-Jones (5)	Wintrust Arena; No Fans	1–1

2021 pre-season schedule

=== Regular season ===
2021 game log
Total: 16–16 (Home: 6–10; Road: 10–6)
May: 2–4 (Home: 0–4; Road: 2–0)

Game	Date	Team	Score	High points	High rebounds	High assists	Location Attendance	Record
1	May 15	@ Washington	W 70–56	Kahleah Copper (19)	Parker; Copper (8)	Diamond DeShields (5)	Entertainment and Sports Arena; 1,050	1–0
2	May 19	@ Atlanta	W 85–77	Kahleah Copper (23)	Astou Ndour-Fall (11)	Courtney Vandersloot (8)	Gateway Center Arena; 689	2–0
3	May 23	New York	L 85–93	Diamond DeShields (22)	Ruthy Hebard (10)	Courtney Vandersloot (16)	Wintrust Arena; 1,332	2–1
4	May 25	Atlanta	L 83–90	Kahleah Copper (21)	DeShields; Ndour-Fall (9)	Courtney Vandersloot (6)	Wintrust Arena; 1,004	2–2
5	May 28	Los Angeles	L 61–76	Diamond DeShields (14)	Astou Ndour-Fall (9)	Courtney Vandersloot (6)	Wintrust Arena; 1,124	2–3
6	May 30	Los Angeles	L 79–82	Courtney Vandersloot (28)	Astou Ndour-Fall (12)	Courtney Vandersloot (7)	Wintrust Arena; 1,124	2–4

June : 8–4 (Home: 3–1; Road: 5–3)

Game	Date	Team	Score	High points	High rebounds	High assists	Location Attendance	Record
7	June 1	Phoenix	L 83–84	Diamond DeShields (26)	Ruthy Hebard (9)	Courtney Vandersloot (10)	Wintrust Arena; 1,217	2–5
8	June 3	@ Phoenix	L 74–77	Kahleah Copper (14)	Kahleah Copper (8)	Courtney Vandersloot (9)	Phoenix Suns Arena; 3,819	2–6
9	June 5	@ Los Angeles	L 63–68	Kahleah Copper (15)	Ruthy Hebard (10)	Courtney Vandersloot (5)	Los Angeles Convention Center; 430	2–7
10	June 9	Indiana	W 92–76	Courtney Vandersloot (17)	Ruthy Hebard (9)	Courtney Vandersloot (9)	Wintrust Arena; 1,090	3–7
11	June 12	@ Indiana	W 83–79	Candace Parker (20)	Candace Parker (14)	Courtney Vandersloot (5)	Indiana Farmers Coliseum; No Fans	4–7
12	June 15	@ Minnesota	W 105–89	Allie Quigley (23)	Candace Parker (7)	Courtney Vandersloot (13)	Target Center; 2,024	5–7
13	June 17	Connecticut	W 81–75	Kahleah Copper (18)	Copper; Parker (8)	Courtney Vandersloot (10)	Wintrust Arena; 1,293	6–7
14	June 19	Connecticut	W 91–81	Courtney Vandersloot (18)	Kahleah Copper (9)	Courtney Vandersloot (11)	Wintrust Arena; 1,293	7–7
15	June 22	@ New York	W 92–72	Candace Parker (23)	Candace Parker (12)	Courtney Vandersloot (10)	Barclays Center; 1,419	8–7
16	June 24	@ New York	W 91–68	Copper; DeShields (18)	Candace Parker (11)	Courtney Vandersloot (9)	Barclays Center; 2,148	9–7
17	June 27	@ Connecticut	L 58–74	Copper; Quigley (11)	DeShields; Dolson (6)	Courtney Vandersloot (7)	Mohegan Sun Arena; 2,014	9–8
18	June 30	@ Dallas	W 91–81	Kahleah Copper (17)	Candace Parker (10)	Courtney Vandersloot (12)	College Park Center; 1,778	10–8

July : 0–2 (Home: 0–1; Road: 0–1)

Game	Date	Team	Score	High points	High rebounds	High assists	Location Attendance	Record
19	July 2	@ Dallas	L 91–100	Candace Parker (22)	Candace Parker (7)	Courtney Vandersloot (9)	College Park Center; 2,187	10–9
20	July 10	Washington	L 85–89 (OT)	Stefanie Dolson (20)	Candace Parker (13)	Courtney Vandersloot (15)	Wintrust Arena; 8,331	10–10

August : 4–3 (Home: 1–1; Road: 3–2)

Game	Date	Team	Score	High points	High rebounds	High assists	Location Attendance	Record
21	August 15	Seattle	W 87–85	Kahleah Copper (19)	Candace Parker (9)	Courtney Vandersloot (11)	Wintrust Arena; 6,231	11–10
22	August 17	Dallas	L 76–80	Allie Quigley (27)	Dolson; Parker (6)	Courtney Vandersloot (12)	Wintrust Arena; 3,902	11–11
23	August 21	Minnesota	L 95–101	Quigley; Vandersloot (27)	Allie Quigley (5)	Courtney Vandersloot (8)	Wintrust Arena; 5,036	11–12
24	August 24	@ Atlanta	W 86–79	Allie Quigley (21)	Candace Parker (9)	Courtney Vandersloot (10)	Gateway Center Arena; 1,292	12–12
25	August 27	@ Seattle	W 73–69	Kahleah Copper (26)	Azurá Stevens (10)	Courtney Vandersloot (8)	Angel of the Winds Arena; 3,650	13–12
26	August 29	@ Seattle	W 107–75	Candace Parker (25)	Parker; Stevens (9)	Courtney Vandersloot (10)	Angel of the Winds Arena; 3,750	14–12
27	August 31	@ Phoenix	L 83–103	Kahleah Copper (18)	Azurá Stevens (9)	Parker; Vandersloot (4)	Phoenix Suns Arena; 5,838	14–13

September : 2–3 (Home: 2–2; Road: 0–1)

Game	Date	Team	Score	High points	High rebounds	High assists	Location Attendance	Record
28	September 2	@ Las Vegas	L 83–90	Candace Parker (30)	Candace Parker (14)	Courtney Vandersloot (8)	Michelob Ultra Arena; 5,150	14–14
29	September 5	Las Vegas	W 92–84	Allie Quigley (22)	Candace Parker (13)	Candace Parker (8)	Wintrust Arena; 5,210	15–14
30	September 12	Washington	L 71–79	Azurá Stevens (18)	Candace Parker (11)	Courtney Vandersloot (6)	Wintrust Arena; 4,707	15–15
31	September 17	Las Vegas	L 70–103	Candace Parker (20)	Azurá Stevens (6)	Courtney Vandersloot (6)	Wintrust Arena; 4,911	15–16
32	September 19	Indiana	W 98–87	Diamond DeShields (30)	Allie Quigley (8)	Diamond DeShields (6)	Wintrust Arena; N/A	16–16

2021 season schedule

=== Playoffs ===
2021 playoff game log
Total: 8–2
First Round

Game	Date	Team	Score	High points	High rebounds	High assists	Location Attendance	Series
1	September 23	Dallas	W 81–64	Kahleah Copper (23)	Candace Parker (15)	Candace Parker (7)	Wintrust Arena; 4,672	1–0

Second Round

Game	Date	Team	Score	High points	High rebounds	High assists	Location Attendance	Series
1	September 26	@ Minnesota	W 89–76	Courtney Vandersloot (19)	Kahleah Copper (10)	Courtney Vandersloot (5)	Target Center; 4,334	1–0

Semifinals

Game	Date	Team	Score	High points	High rebounds	High assists	Location Attendance	Series
1	September 28	@ Connecticut	W 101–95 (2OT)	Candace Parker (22)	Courtney Vandersloot (10)	Courtney Vandersloot (18)	Mohegan Sun Arena; 4,720	1–0
2	September 30	@ Connecticut	L 68–79	Kahleah Copper (13)	Candace Parker (7)	Courtney Vandersloot (6)	Mohegan Sun Arena; 6,088	1–1
3	October 3	Connecticut	W 86–83	Kahleah Copper (26)	Azurá Stevens (11)	Courtney Vandersloot (13)	Wintrust Arena; 7,421	2–1
4	October 6	Connecticut	W 79–69	Courtney Vandersloot (19)	Candace Parker (9)	Candace Parker (7)	Wintrust Arena	3-1

Finals

Game	Date	Team	Score	High points	High rebounds	High assists	Location Attendance	Series
1	October 10	@ Phoenix	W 91–77	Kahleah Copper (21)	Kahleah Copper (10)	Courtney Vandersloot (11)	Footprint Center; 10,191	1–0
2	October 13	@ Phoenix	L 86–91 (OT)	Courtney Vandersloot (20)	Copper; Parker; Stevens (9)	Courtney Vandersloot (14)	Footprint Center; 13,685	1–1
3	October 15	Phoenix	W 86–50	Kahleah Copper (22)	Azurá Stevens (6)	Courtney Vandersloot (10)	Wintrust Arena; 10,378	2–1
4	October 17	Phoenix	W 80–74	Allie Quigley (26)	Candace Parker (13)	Courtney Vandersloot (15)	Wintrust Arena; 10,378	3–1

2021 playoff schedule

== Standings ==
#	Team	W	L	PCT	GB	Conf.	Home	Road	Cup
1	x – Connecticut Sun	26	6	.813	–	12–3	15–1	11–5	9–1
2	x – Las Vegas Aces	24	8	.750	2	11–4	13–3	11–5	6–4
3	x – Minnesota Lynx	22	10	.688	4	10–5	13–3	9–7	7–3
4	x – Seattle Storm	21	11	.656	5	9–6	11–5	10–6	8–2
5	x – Phoenix Mercury	19	13	.594	7	6–9	7–9	12–4	5–5
6	x – Chicago Sky	16	16	.500	10	10–5	6–10	10–6	6–4
7	x – Dallas Wings	14	18	.438	12	7–8	7–9	7–9	3–7
8	x – New York Liberty	12	20	.375	14	6–9	7–9	5–11	5–5
9	e – Washington Mystics	12	20	.375	14	7–8	8–8	4–12	4–6
10	e – Los Angeles Sparks	12	20	.375	14	2–13	8–8	4–12	1–9
11	e – Atlanta Dream	8	24	.250	18	6–9	4–12	4–12	4–6
12	e – Indiana Fever	6	26	.188	20	4–11	4–12	2–14	2–8

Notes

(#) – League Standing
x – Clinched playoff berth
e – Eliminated from playoff contention
Source: Overall standings and Commissioner's Cup Standings

== Playoffs ==
First round Sept. 23
5	Phoenix Mercury	83
8	New York Liberty	82
6	Chicago Sky	81
7	Dallas Wings	64

Second round Sept. 26
4	Seattle Storm	80
5	Phoenix Mercury	85^{OT}
3	Minnesota Lynx	76
6	Chicago Sky	89

Semifinals; Sept. 28 – Oct. 8
2	Las Vegas Aces	96	91	60	93	84
5	Phoenix Mercury	90	117	87	76	87
1	Connecticut Sun	95	79	83	69	–
6	Chicago Sky	101^{2OT}	68	86	79	–

WNBA Finals; Oct. 10 – Oct. 17
5	Phoenix Mercury	77	91^{OT}	50	74	–
6	Chicago Sky	91	86	86	80	–

Note: Teams re-seeded after each round.

== Statistics ==
Legend
GP	Games played	GS	Games started	MPG	Minutes per game	RPG	Rebounds per game
APG	Assists per game	SPG	Steals per game	BPG	Blocks per game	PPG	Points per game
FG%	Field-goal percentage	3P%	3-point field-goal percentage	FT%	Free-throw percentage	TO	Turnovers per game
PF	Fouls per game		Team leader		League leader

=== Regular season ===
Player	GP	GS	MPG	FG%	3P%	FT%	RPG	APG	SPG	BPG	PPG
Kahleah Copper	32	32	30.8	45.9	30.6	81.8	4.2	1.8	0.9	0.3	14.4
Candace Parker	23	23	26.7	45.8	32.9	79.4	8.4	4.0	0.7	1.2	13.3
Allie Quigley	26	11	24.4	44.8	45.4	95.9	2.7	2.3	0.5	0.3	13.2
Diamond DeShields	32	22	26.9	39.3	30.0	82.0	3.5	2.3	1.2	0.4	11.3
Courtney Vandersloot	32	32	30.5	43.3	34.6	85.7	3.4	8.6	1.7	0.4	10.5
Stefanie Dolson	24	15	20.0	48.6	40.4	94.7	3.5	1.3	0.3	0.8	7.5
Azurá Stevens	30	11	19.6	50.0	33.3	81.3	4.6	0.8	0.8	0.7	7.4
Astou Ndour-Fall	20	8	17.1	39.7	23.5	94.1	4.8	0.4	0.4	0.8	6.6
Ruthy Hebard	30	6	16.8	52.9	0.0	79.4	4.4	0.8	0.7	0.7	5.8
Dana Evans	23	0	8.6	35.6	40.5	87.5	0.5	1.2	0.2	0.0	3.9
Lexie Brown	17	0	9.5	26.3	24.2	0.0	0.7	1.1	0.4	0.0	1.6

== Awards and honors ==
Recipient	Award	Date awarded	Ref.
Courtney Vandersloot	Eastern Conference Player of the Week	June 21	
Kahleah Copper	WNBA All-Star Selection	June 30	
Courtney Vandersloot	WNBA All-Star Selection	June 30	
Candace Parker	WNBA All-Star Selection	June 30	
James Wade	Coach of the Month – June	July 1	
Courtney Vandersloot	Peak Performer: Assists	September 20	
Dana Evans	WNBA All-Rookie Team	October 5	
Courtney Vandersloot	All-WNBA Second Team	October 15	
Kahleah Copper	WNBA Finals MVP	October 17	
