= Brionna Jones =

American basketball player (born 1995)

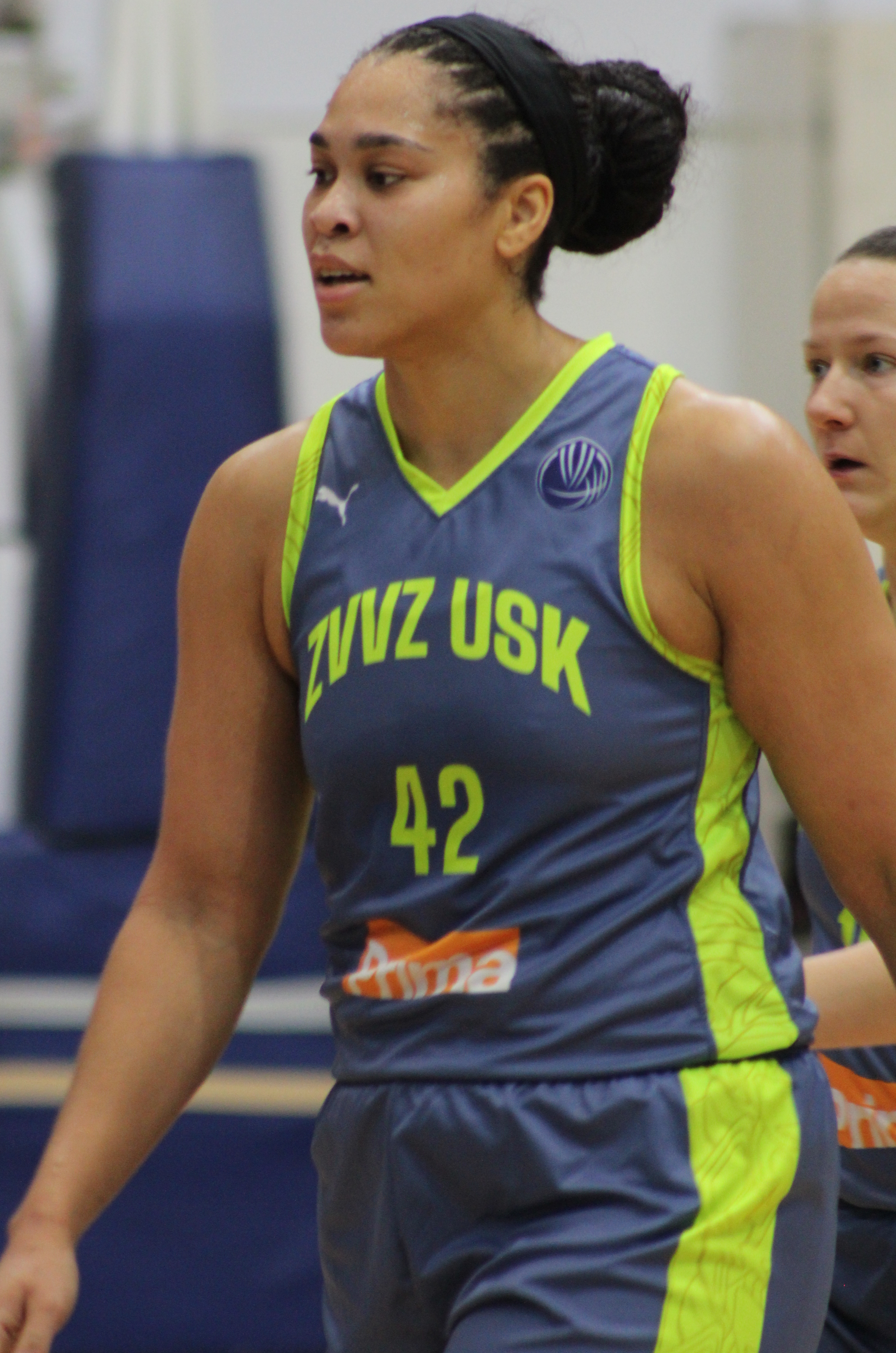
- Jones with USK Prague in 2024

No. 42 – Atlanta Dream
- Position: Power forward
- League: WNBA

Personal information
- Born: December 18, 1995 (age 30) Baltimore, Maryland, U.S.
- Listed height: 6 ft 3 in (1.91 m)
- Listed weight: 215 lb (98 kg)

Career information
- High school: Aberdeen (Aberdeen, Maryland)
- College: Maryland (2014–2017)
- WNBA draft: 2017: 1st round, 8th overall pick
- Drafted by: Connecticut Sun
- Playing career: 2017–present

Career history
- 2017–2024: Connecticut Sun
- 2017–2019: Nadezhda Orenburg
- 2019–2023: USK Prague
- 2024–2026: USK Prague
- 2025–present: Atlanta Dream

Career highlights
- EuroLeague Women champion (2025); EuroLeague Women finals MVP (2025); EuroCup Women champion (2019); WNBA Sixth Player of the Year (2022); 4× WNBA All-Star (2021, 2022, 2024, 2025); WNBA Most Improved Player (2021); WNBA All-Defensive Second Team (2021); All-American – USBWA (2017); First-team All-American – AP (2017); Big Ten Tournament MOP (2017); Big Ten All-Defensive Team (2017); 3× First-team All-Big Ten (2015–2017)
- Stats at WNBA.com
- Stats at Basketball Reference
Medals
Representing United States
Women's basketball
World Cup
Gold medal – first place	2022 Australia
2015 Summer Universiade
Gold medal – first place	2015 Gwangju	Team
Women's 3x3 basketball
FIBA 3x3 AmeriCup
Gold medal – first place	2021 Miami	Team

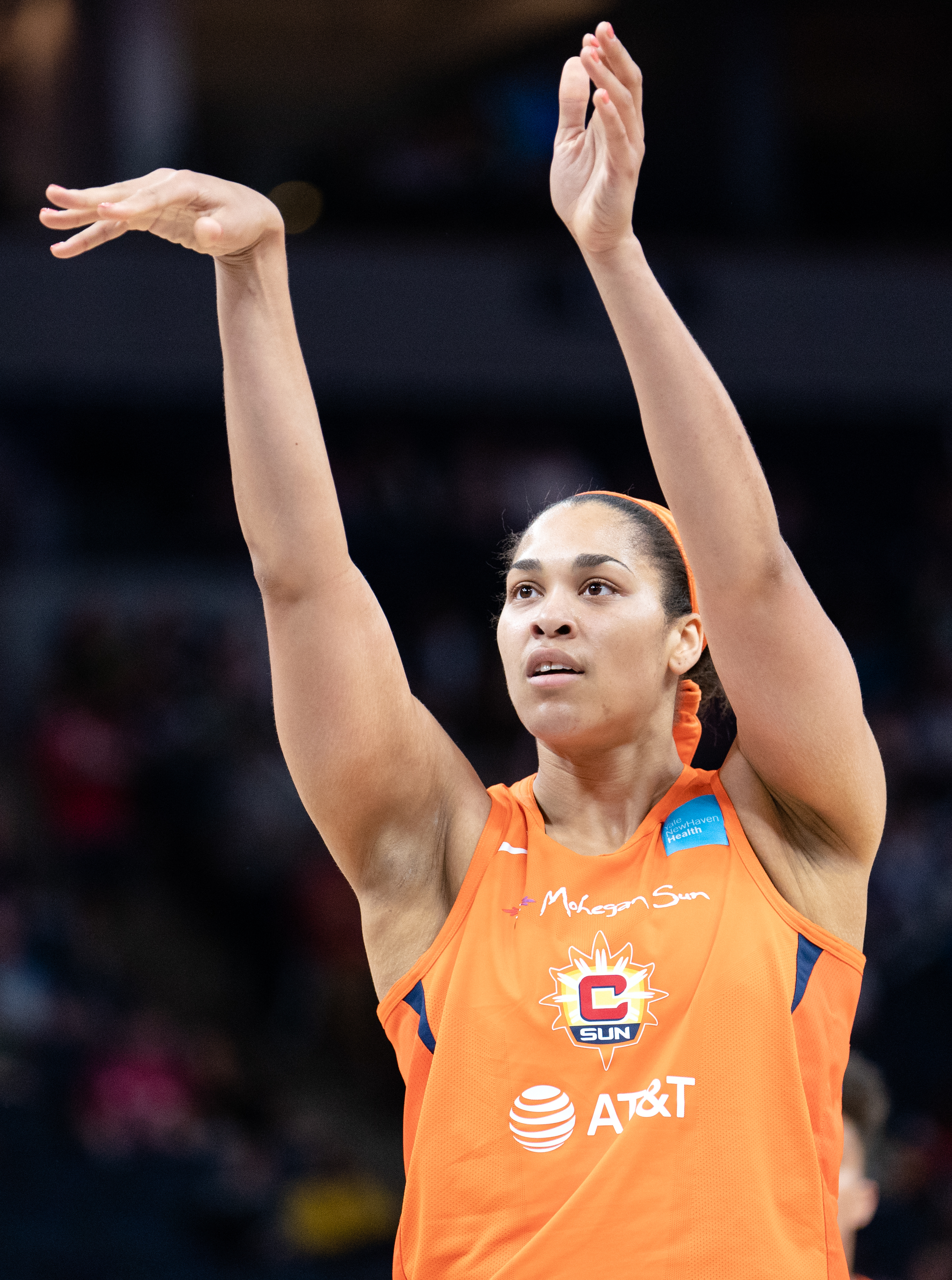
Jones with the Connecticut Sun in 2019

Brionna Jones (born December 18, 1995) is an American professional basketball center for the Atlanta Dream of the Women's National Basketball Association (WNBA). She played college basketball for the Maryland Terrapins. She was selected with the eighth overall pick by the Connecticut Sun in the 2017 WNBA draft.

== Early life ==
Jones was born to Michael and Sanciarhea Jones. Jones is from Havre de Grace, Maryland. She has an older brother Jarred, a younger sister, Stephanie, and a younger brother, Jordan. She attended Aberdeen High School, and led her high school to a state championship her junior year.

== College career ==
Jones attended the University of Maryland, where she graduated in three years and majored in kinesiology.

== Professional career ==
=== WNBA ===
==== Connecticut Sun (2017–2024) ====
In the 2017 WNBA draft Jones was selected 8th overall by the Connecticut Sun.

Jones broke out in the 2020 WNBA Bubble and showed signs of top super-star potential.

In 2021 Jones had her breakout year averaging 14.7 points, 7.3 rebounds, 1.8 assists and 30.6 minutes while starting all 32 games for the Sun this season. Her previous career highs in each of those categories were all set with the Sun in 2020, when she averaged 11.2 points, 5.6 rebounds, 1.0 assists and 26.1 minutes in 21 games. Jones was selected as a 2021 WNBA All Star. Jones helped the Sun post the highest winning percentage in franchise history (.813) and finish the regular season with 14 consecutive victories for the fourth-longest winning streak in WNBA history. With her improvement and her becoming one of the next stars in the WNBA Jones was named the 2021 WNBA Most Improved Player Award, Jones was also named to the 2021 WNBA All Defensive Second Team .

On June 23, 2023, Jones suffered a ruptured Achilles tendon in her right leg, necessitating season–ending surgery.

==== Atlanta Dream (2025–present) ====
On February 1, 2025, Jones signed with the Atlanta Dream. On March 20, 2026, it was announced that she had undergone surgery on her right knee after she had sustained a menisucus injury while playing for USK Prague in late January.

=== Overseas ===
Jones played for Nadezhda Orenburg of the Russian Premier League from 2017 to 2019. She won the 2018–19 EuroCup with the team.

Since 2019, Jones has played for USK Prague of the Czech Women's Basketball League, missing only the 2023–2024 season due to her Achilles injury. She won the 2024–25 EuroLeague with the team, being named Final Six MVP after averaging 19.0 points, 7.7 rebounds, 2.0 assists, and 2.3 steals across the three games.

== Career statistics ==
=== WNBA ===
==== Regular season ====
WNBA regular season statistics
Year	Team	GP	GS	MPG	FG%	3P%	FT%	RPG	APG	SPG	BPG	TO	PPG
2017	Connecticut	23	0	6.4	.575	—	.833	1.7	.1	.4	.1	**.4**	2.9
2018	Connecticut	27	0	9.0	.469	—	.727	2.0	.2	.2	.2	.6	3.1
2019	Connecticut	27	0	8.4	.467	—	.667	2.2	.3	.3	.3	.7	3.5
2020	Connecticut	21	21	26.1	**.605**	**1.000**	.691	5.6	1.0	1.7	.7	1.6	11.2
2021	Connecticut	32	32	30.6	.571	—	.796	7.3	1.8	1.4	.5	2.2	14.7
2022	Connecticut	36	7	25.1	.571	—	.844	5.1	1.3	1.2	.4	1.5	13.8
2023	Connecticut	13	13	**31.7**	.571	.500	.776	**8.2**	**2.4**	**1.8**	.5	2.2	**15.9**
2024	Connecticut	40°	40°	27.2	.539	.143	.738	5.5	1.5	1.2	.6	1.3	13.7
2025	Atlanta	**44**	**44**	26.6	.527	.261	.773	7.3	2.2	1.1	**.8**	1.5	12.8
2026	Atlanta	9	0	16.9	.519	.167	**.905**	5.6	2.0	.3	.7	1.0	8.2
**Career**	10 years, 2 teams	272	157	21.6	.549	.222	.776	5.1	1.3	1.0	.5	1.3	10.4
**Career**	All-Star	4	0	12.5	.577	.333	1.000	3.0	1.25	.3	.0	.3	8.8

==== Playoffs ====
WNBA playoff statistics
Year	Team	GP	GS	MPG	FG%	3P%	FT%	RPG	APG	SPG	BPG	TO	PPG
2019	Connecticut	8	0	4.4	.625	—	**1.000**	.9	.3	.4	.0	**.5**	1.5
2020	Connecticut	7	**7**	**28.3**	.453	—	.889	**7.3**	1.4	1.6	.3	1.4	9.4
2021	Connecticut	4	4	25.8	.594	—	.643	4.3	.5	1.5	**.8**	1.5	**11.8**
2022	Connecticut	**12**	0	21.3	.522	—	.711	4.0	1.3	.9	.3	1.2	10.3
2023	Connecticut	Did not play (season-ending injury)											
2024	Connecticut	7	**7**	19.9	.482	—	.769	3.6	1.4	.6	.6	2.0	9.1
2025	Atlanta	3	3	**28.3**	**.667**	**.500**	.750	4.7	**2.7**	**2.0**	.3	2.0	10.7
**Career**	6 years, 2 teams	41	21	19.9	.520	.200	.738	4.0	1.2	1.0	.3	1.3	8.4

=== College ===
Legend
GP	Games played	GS	Games started	MPG	Minutes per game	FG%	Field goal percentage
3P%	3-point field goal percentage	FT%	Free throw percentage	RPG	Rebounds per game	APG	Assists per game
SPG	Steals per game	BPG	Blocks per game	TO	Turnovers per game	PPG	Points per game
**Bold**	Career high	*	Led Division I

NCAA statistics
Year	Team	GP	GS	MPG	FG%	3P%	FT%	RPG	APG	SPG	BPG	TO	PPG
2013–14	Maryland	35	13	16.2	.607	—	.554	4.5	.3	.7	.5	**1.2**	6.9
2014–15	Maryland	**37**	**37**	24.4	.601*	.000	.634	8.9	.7	1.0	1.3	1.8	12.4
2015–16	Maryland	35	34	25.9	.665*	—	.635	9.8	1.1	1.1	1.1	2.4	15.2
2016–17	Maryland	35	35	**26.8**	**.690***	.000	**.767**	**10.9**	**1.5**	**1.9**	**1.6**	1.4	**19.9**
**Career**		142	119	23.3	.650	.000	.672	8.5	.9	1.2	1.2	1.7	13.6

== Personal life ==
Jones's sister, Stephanie, played with her on the Connecticut Sun in the 2021 and 2022 seasons.
