= 2021 Connecticut Sun season =

- Head coach: Curt Miller
- Arena: Mohegan Sun Arena

Results
- Record: 26–6 (.813)
- Place: 1st (Eastern)
- Playoff finish: 1st seed, Lost in Semifinals to Phoenix Mercury 2–3

The 2021 Connecticut Sun season was the 23rd season for the Connecticut Sun franchise of the Women's National Basketball Association. It was also the 19th season for the franchise in Connecticut. The season began on May 14, 2021, at the Atlanta Dream.

The Sun started the season strongly and went on a five-game winning streak before losing their first game. They lost two of their last three games in May to finish with a strong 6–2 record in that month. The month of June was streaky for the Sun, with a three-game losing streak book-ended by a two-game winning streak and a three-game winning streak. Those streaks left the team with a 5–3 record in June. The Sun went 3–1 in July, the last month before the Olympic break. The team headed into the Olympic break with a 14–6 overall record.

The first game back from the Olympic break was the inaugural WNBA Commissioner's Cup, where the Sun faced off against the Seattle Storm in Phoenix. The game was difficult for the Sun and they lost 57–79. However, this result would not portend the rest of the team's results after the Olympic break. The Sun won their remaining seven games in August to finish the month with a 7–0 regular season record. Their dominance continued into September where the Sun went 5–0, to finish the season on a thirteen-game winning streak. Their final regular season record was 26–6, which earned them the top seed in the 2021 WNBA Playoffs. Their 26 wins was tied for the most regular season wins in franchise history with 2005 and 2006.

As the first seed in the playoffs, the Sun earned a double bye into the Semifinals and would have home-court advantage against the lowest remaining seed from the second round. After the second round, it was determined that the Sun would play the Chicago Sky. The series started off with a thrilling double overtime game that the Sun dropped 95–101. The Sun won the next game 79–68 to take a 1–1 series into Chicago. Chicago used their home court to their advantage and won the next two games and the series 3–1.

== WNBA draft ==
Round	Pick	Player	Nationality	School/Team/Country
2	20	DiJonai Carrington	United States	Baylor
2	21	Micaela Kelly	United States	Central Michigan
3	30	Aleah Goodman	United States	Oregon State

== Trades/Roster Changes ==
Date	Details
January 4, 2021	Extended Qualifying Offer to Natisha Hiedeman
January 5, 2021	Extended Qualifying Offers to Brionna Jones and Beatrice Mompremier
January 7, 2021	Signed Natisha Hiedeman to the Qualifying Offer
January 10, 2021	Signed Beatrice Mompremier to the Qualifying Offer
February 1, 2021	Signed Kamiah Smalls to a Training Camp Contract
February 2, 2021	Re-Signed Alyssa Thomas
February 4, 2021	Re-Signed Jasmine Thomas
February 5, 2021	Re-Signed Brionna Jones
February 6, 2021	Signed Sydney Wallace to a Training Camp Contract
February 15, 2021	Signed Morgan Bertsch to a Training Camp Contract
March 28, 2021	Signed Stephanie Jones to a Training Camp Contract
April 9, 2021	Signed Tanaya Atkinson to a Training Camp Contract
April 16, 2021	Signed Teana Muldrow to a Training Camp Contract
April 17, 2021	Signed DiJonai Carrington, Micaela Kelly, and Aleah Goodman to Rookie Scale Contracts.
April 17, 2021	Signed Feyonda Fitzgerald, Vionise Pierre-Louis, and Kai James to Training Camp Contracts.
April 18, 2021	Signed Brianna Fraser to a Training Camp Contract
April 17, 2021	Waived Sydney Wallace, Vionise Pierre-Louis, Teana Muldrow, and Kai James.
May 2, 2021	Waived Tanaya Atkinson.
May 9, 2021	Waived Micaela Kelly, Feyonda Fitzgerald, and Morgan Bertsch.
May 11, 2021	Waived Aleah Goodman and Brianna Fraser.
May 12, 2021	Waived Kamiah Smalls.
May 12, 2021	Temporarily Suspended Jasmine Thomas.
May 14, 2021	Signed Aleah Goodman to a Hardship Contract.
May 17, 2021	Activate Jasmine Thomas from Temporary Suspension List.
May 17, 2021	Released Aleah Goodman from Hardship Contract.
May 21, 2021	Signed Shatori Walker-Kimbrough to a Hardship Contract.
May 28, 2021	Released Shatori Walker-Kimbrough from the Hardship Contract.
June 6, 2021	Temporarily Suspend Jonquel Jones due to Overseas Commitments
June 7, 2021	Signed Emma Cannon to a Hardship Contract
June 27, 2021	Release Emma Cannon from the Hardship Contract
June 29, 2021	Activate Jonquel Jones from Temporary Suspension

== Roster ==
2021 Connecticut Sun roster
Players
Coaches

Pos.	No.	Nat.	Name	Height	Weight	DOB	From	Yrs
G/F	24	(United States)	Bonner, DeWanna	6' 4" (1.93m)	143 lb (65kg)	1987-08-21	Auburn	11
G/F	21	(United States)	Carrington, DiJonai	5' 11" (1.8m)	175 lb (79kg)	1998-01-08	Baylor	R
G/F	3	(United States)	Charles, Kaila	6' 1" (1.85m)	167 lb (76kg)	1998-03-23	Maryland	1
G	2	(United States)	Hiedeman, Natisha	5' 8" (1.73m)	135 lb (61kg)	1997-02-10	Marquette	2
G	20	(United States)	January, Briann	5' 8" (1.73m)	144 lb (65kg)	1987-01-11	Arizona State	12
F	42	(United States)	Jones, Brionna	6' 3" (1.91m)	230 lb (104kg)	1995-12-18	Maryland	4
F	35	(Bosnia and Herzegovina)	Jones, Jonquel	6' 6" (1.98m)	190 lb (86kg)	1994-01-05	George Washington	4
F	4	(United States)	Jones, Stephanie	6' 3" (1.91m)	185 lb (84kg)	1998-07-10	Maryland	R
F	1	(United States)	Mompremier, Beatrice	6' 4" (1.93m)	190 lb (86kg)	1996-08-08	Miami (FL)	1
F	25	(United States)	Thomas, Alyssa	6' 2" (1.88m)	185 lb (84kg)	1992-04-12	Maryland	6
G	5	(United States)	Thomas, Jasmine	5' 9" (1.75m)	143 lb (65kg)	1989-09-30	Duke	9

Head coach
(United States) Curt Miller (Baldwin Wallace)
Assistant coaches
(United States) Brandi Poole
(United States) Chris Koclanes
Athletic trainer
(United States) Nicole Alexander
Strength and conditioning coach
(United States) Analisse Rios

Legend

- (C) Team captain
- (DP) Unsigned draft pick
- (FA) Free agent
- (S) Suspended
- Injured

=== Depth chart ===
Pos.	Starter	Bench
PG	Jasmine Thomas	Natisha Hiedeman
SG	Briann January	Kaila Charles
SF	DeWanna Bonner	DiJonai Carrington
PF	Jonquel Jones	Alyssa Thomas; Stephanie Jones
C	Brionna Jones	Beatrice Mompremier

== Game log ==
=== Preseason ===
2021 pre-season game log
May: 1–0 (Home: 0–0; Road: 1–0)

Game	Date	Team	Score	High points	High rebounds	High assists	Location Attendance	Record
1	May 3	New York	Scrimmage				Mohegan Sun Arena; 0	0–0
2	May 8	@ Dallas	W 89–76	Brionna Jones (22)	Brionna Jones (9)	Aleah Goodman (5)	College Park Center	1–0

2021 pre-season schedule

=== Regular season ===
2021 game log
Total: 26–6 (Home: 15–1; Road: 11–5)
May: 6–2 (Home: 3–0; Road: 3–2)

Game	Date	Team	Score	High points	High rebounds	High assists	Location Attendance	Record
1	May 14	@ Atlanta	W 78–67	Jonquel Jones (26)	J. Jones; Hiedeman (8)	DeWanna Bonner (5)	Gateway Center Arena; 561	1–0
2	May 16	Phoenix	W 86–78	DeWanna Bonner (27)	Jonquel Jones (13)	Briann January (6)	Mohegan Sun Arena; 2,042	2–0
3	May 19	Indiana	W 88–67	Natisha Hiedeman (19)	Jonquel Jones (11)	Natisha Hiedeman (6)	Mohegan Sun Arena; 2,084	3–0
4	May 21	@ Phoenix	W 84–67	Jonquel Jones (16)	Jonquel Jones (11)	DeWanna Bonner (5)	Phoenix Suns Arena; 4,101	4–0
5	May 23	@ Las Vegas	W 72–65	DeWanna Bonner (22)	Jonquel Jones (11)	Jasmine Thomas (5)	Michelob Ultra Arena; 1,954	5–0
6	May 25	@ Seattle	L 87–90 (OT)	Jonquel Jones (28)	Jonquel Jones (13)	Jasmine Thomas (6)	Angel of the Winds Arena; 1,011	5–1
7	May 28	Washington	W 86–81	Jonquel Jones (20)	Jonquel Jones (12)	Jonquel Jones (5)	Mohegan Sun Arena; 2,102	6–1
8	May 30	@ Minnesota	L 74–79 (OT)	Jonquel Jones (22)	Bonner; B. Jones (6)	Bonner; J. Thomas (5)	Target Center; 2,007	6–2

June : 5–3 (Home: 4–1; Road: 1–2)

Game	Date	Team	Score	High points	High rebounds	High assists	Location Attendance	Record
9	June 1	Las Vegas	W 74–67	Jonquel Jones (23)	Bonner; B. Jones (8)	Jasmine Thomas (6)	Mohegan Sun Arena; N/A	7–2
10	June 5	New York	W 85–64	Jonquel Jones (31)	Jonquel Jones (13)	Jasmine Thomas (9)	Mohegan Sun Arena; 2,118	8–2
11	June 13	Seattle	L 66–89	Bonner; Charles (14)	DiJonai Carrington (7)	Briann January (4)	Mohegan Sun Arena; 2,248	8–3
12	June 17	@ Chicago	L 75–81	Jasmine Thomas (20)	Brionna Jones (12)	Jasmine Thomas (4)	Wintrust Arena; 1,293	8–4
13	June 19	@ Chicago	L 81–91	Brionna Jones (22)	B. Jones; Bonner (8)	Bonner; January (6)	Wintrust Arena; 1,293	8–5
14	June 22	Dallas	W 80–70	Brionna Jones (26)	DeWanna Bonner (13)	DeWanna Bonner (6)	Mohegan Sun Arena; 2,076	9–5
15	June 27	Chicago	W 74–58	DeWanna Bonner (23)	Beatrice Mompremier (11)	January; J. Thomas (3)	Mohegan Sun Arena; 2,014	10–5
16	June 29	@ Washington	W 90–71	Jonquel Jones (23)	Jonquel Jones (16)	DeWanna Bonner (7)	Entertainment and Sports Arena; 2,100	11–5

July : 3–1 (Home: 1–0; Road: 2–1)

Game	Date	Team	Score	High points	High rebounds	High assists	Location Attendance	Record
17	July 1	@ Indiana	W 86–80	Brionna Jones (34)	Bonner; B. Jones (7)	Jasmine Thomas (7)	Bankers Life Fieldhouse; No Fans	12–5
18	July 3	@ Indiana	L 67–73	Jonquel Jones (16)	Jonquel Jones (9)	Bonner; Charles (4)	Bankers Life Fieldhouse; No Fans	12–6
19	July 9	Atlanta	W 84–72	Jonquel Jones (24)	Jonquel Jones (16)	Hiedeman (5)	Mohegan Sun Arena; 2,286	13–6
20	July 11	@ New York	W 71–54	Jonquel Jones (17)	Jonquel Jones (17)	Jonquel Jones (5)	Barclays Center; 1,988	14–6

August : 7–0 (Home: 7–0; Road: 0–0)

Game	Date	Team	Score	High points	High rebounds	High assists	Location Attendance	Record
CC	August 12	vs. Seattle	L 57–79	Bonner; Hiedeman (11)	Jonquel Jones (11)	Jasmine Thomas (3)	Footprint Center; 5,006	N/A
21	August 15	@ Dallas	W 80–59	Jonquel Jones (19)	Jonquel Jones (15)	Briann January (5)	College Park Center; 2,399	15–6
22	August 17	Minnesota	W 72–60	Jasmine Thomas (19)	Jonquel Jones (13)	Jasmine Thomas (5)	Mohegan Sun Arena; 3,488	16–6
23	August 19	Minnesota	W 82–71	DeWanna Bonner (31)	DeWanna Bonner (11)	Jasmine Thomas (7)	Mohegan Sun Arena; 3,536	17–6
24	August 24	Las Vegas	W 76–62	Briann January (19)	Jonquel Jones (10)	Jasmine Thomas (6)	Mohegan Sun Arena; 4,012	18–6
25	August 26	Los Angeles	W 76–72	Brionna Jones (23)	Jonquel Jones (11)	Jasmine Thomas (6)	Mohegan Sun Arena; 3,702	19–6
26	August 28	Los Angeles	W 76–61	Brionna Jones (16)	Brionna Jones (15)	Jasmine Thomas (5)	Mohegan Sun Arena; 4,434	20–6
27	August 31	@ Washington	W 85–75	Jonquel Jones (31)	Jonquel Jones (14)	Jasmine Thomas (6)	Entertainment and Sports Arena; 2,269	21–6

September : 5–0 (Home: 2–0; Road: 3–0)

Game	Date	Team	Score	High points	High rebounds	High assists	Location Attendance	Record
28	September 7	@ Dallas	W 83–56	Brionna Jones (18)	Brionna Jones (10)	Jasmine Thomas (6)	College Park Center; 1,945	22–6
29	September 9	@ Los Angeles	W 75–57	Jonquel Jones (21)	Jonquel Jones (14)	DeWanna Bonner (5)	Staples Center; 1,695	23–6
30	September 11	@ Phoenix	W 76–67	Jasmine Thomas (17)	Jonquel Jones (16)	Briann January (5)	Footprint Center; 9,811	24–6
31	September 15	New York	W 98–69	Bonner; J. Jones (18)	Jonquel Jones (13)	Natisha Hiedeman (5)	Mohegan Sun Arena; 4,012	25–6
32	September 19	Atlanta	W 84–64	Natisha Hiedeman (16)	Brionna Jones (12)	Briann January (4)	Mohegan Sun Arena; 4,724	26–6

2021 season schedule

=== Playoffs ===
2021 playoff game log
Total: 1–3
Semifinals

Game	Date	Team	Score	High points	High rebounds	High assists	Location Attendance	Series
1	September 28	Chicago	L 95–101 (2OT)	Jonquel Jones (26)	Jonquel Jones (11)	January; J. Jones (4)	Mohegan Sun Arena; 4,720	0–1
2	September 30	Chicago	W 79–68	Bonner; A. Thomas (15)	Alyssa Thomas (11)	Alyssa Thomas (6)	Mohegan Sun Arena; 6,088	1–1
3	October 3	@ Chicago	L 83–86	DeWanna Bonner (22)	Jonquel Jones (10)	Jasmine Thomas (6)	Wintrust Arena; 7,421	1–2
4	October 6	@ Chicago	L 69–79	Jonquel Jones (25)	Jonquel Jones (11)	Alyssa Thomas (4)	Wintrust Arena	

2021 playoff schedule

== Standings ==
#	Team	W	L	PCT	GB	Conf.	Home	Road	Cup
1	x – Connecticut Sun	26	6	.813	–	12–3	15–1	11–5	9–1
2	x – Las Vegas Aces	24	8	.750	2	11–4	13–3	11–5	6–4
3	x – Minnesota Lynx	22	10	.688	4	10–5	13–3	9–7	7–3
4	x – Seattle Storm	21	11	.656	5	9–6	11–5	10–6	8–2
5	x – Phoenix Mercury	19	13	.594	7	6–9	7–9	12–4	5–5
6	x – Chicago Sky	16	16	.500	10	10–5	6–10	10–6	6–4
7	x – Dallas Wings	14	18	.438	12	7–8	7–9	7–9	3–7
8	x – New York Liberty	12	20	.375	14	6–9	7–9	5–11	5–5
9	e – Washington Mystics	12	20	.375	14	7–8	8–8	4–12	4–6
10	e – Los Angeles Sparks	12	20	.375	14	2–13	8–8	4–12	1–9
11	e – Atlanta Dream	8	24	.250	18	6–9	4–12	4–12	4–6
12	e – Indiana Fever	6	26	.188	20	4–11	4–12	2–14	2–8

Notes

(#) – League Standing
x – Clinched playoff berth
e – Eliminated from playoff contention
Source: Overall standings and Commissioner's Cup Standings

== Playoffs ==
**First round** single elimination Sept. 23
**5**	**Phoenix Mercury**	**83**
8	New York Liberty	82
**6**	**Chicago Sky**	**81**
7	Dallas Wings	64

**Second round** single elimination Sept. 26
4	Seattle Storm	80
**5**	**Phoenix Mercury**	**85^{OT}**
3	Minnesota Lynx	76
**6**	**Chicago Sky**	**89**

**Semifinals**; Best-of-5; Sept. 28 – Oct. 8
2	Las Vegas Aces	2
**5**	**Phoenix Mercury**	**3**
1	Connecticut Sun	1
**6**	**Chicago Sky**	**3**

**Finals**; Best-of-5; Oct. 10 – 17
5	Phoenix Mercury	1
**6**	**Chicago Sky**	**3**

Note: Teams re-seeded after each round.

- **Bold** – Game or series winner
- Italic – Team with home-court advantage

== Statistics ==
Legend
GP	Games played	GS	Games started	MPG	Minutes per game	RPG	Rebounds per game
APG	Assists per game	SPG	Steals per game	BPG	Blocks per game	PPG	Points per game
FG%	Field-goal percentage	3P%	3-point field-goal percentage	FT%	Free-throw percentage	TO	Turnovers per game
PF	Fouls per game		Team leader		League leader

=== Regular season ===
Player	GP	GS	MPG	FG%	3P%	FT%	RPG	APG	SPG	BPG	PPG
Jonquel Jones	27	27	31.7	51.5	36.2	80.2	11.2	2.8	1.3	1.3	19.4
DeWanna Bonner	32	32	31.9	39.5	31.7	89.2	6.4	3.4	1.3	0.7	15.2
Brionna Jones	32	32	30.6	57.1	0.0	79.6	7.3	1.8	1.4	0.5	14.7
Jasmine Thomas	30	30	29.6	38.6	40.0	87.5	2.4	4.0	1.3	0.2	10.6
Natisha Hiedeman	32	5	20.1	40.0	39.8	70.0	1.8	1.9	0.8	0.2	7.6
Briann January	29	29	30.2	42.5	38.0	86.8	1.4	3.1	0.9	0.1	7.0
Alyssa Thomas	2	0	17.5	26.7	0.0	75.0	5.0	2.0	0.5	0.0	5.5
Kaila Charles	30	4	16.3	36.8	30.3	87.5	2.8	1.1	0.5	0.4	4.3
DiJonai Carrington	24	1	9.2	32.9	14.3	73.3	2.0	0.5	0.5	0.1	2.8
Beatrice Mompremier	32	0	8.6	49.1	0.0	41.7	2.4	0.2	0.4	0.3	1.8
Stephanie Jones	18	0	5.5	41.1	0.0	50.0	1.2	0.2	0.1	0.1	1.4

== Awards and honors ==
Recipient	Award	Date awarded	Ref.
Jonquel Jones	Eastern Conference Player of the Month	June 2	
Jonquel Jones	Eastern Conference Player of the Week	June 7	
DeWanna Bonner	Eastern Conference Player of the Week	June 28	
Brionna Jones	WNBA All-Star Selection	June 30	
Jonquel Jones	WNBA All-Star Selection	June 30	
DeWanna Bonner	WNBA All-Star Selection	June 30	
Brionna Jones	Eastern Conference Player of the Week	July 6	
Jonquel Jones yay	Eastern Conference Player of the Week	July 12	
Jonquel Jones yay	Eastern Conference Player of the Week	August 23	
Brionna Jones	Eastern Conference Player of the Week	August 30	
Jonquel Jones	Eastern Conference Player of the Month	September 2	
Curt Miller	WNBA Coach of the Month – August	September 2	
Jonquel Jones	Eastern Conference Player of the Week	September 6	
Curt Miller	WNBA Coach of the Month – September	September 20	
Jonquel Jones	Eastern Conference Player of the Month	September 20	
Jonquel Jones	Peak Performer: Rebounds	September 20	
Briann January	WNBA All-Defensive First Team	September 26	
Jonquel Jones	WNBA All-Defensive First Team	September 26	
Jasmine Thomas	WNBA All-Defensive Second Team	September 26	
Brionna Jones	WNBA All-Defensive Second Team	September 26	
Jonquel Jones	WNBA MVP	September 28	
Brionna Jones	WNBA Most Improved Player	September 28	
Curt Miller	Coach of the Year Award	September 28	
Jonquel Jones	All-WNBA First Team	October 15	
