= Weddington High School =

Public high school in Matthews, North Carolina, USA

Location
- 4901 Monroe Weddington Road; Matthews, North Carolina 28104; United States; 35°00′03″N 80°43′32″W

Information
- Type: Public
- Established: 2000 (26 years ago)
- School district: Union County Public Schools
- CEEB code: 342533
- Principal: Kevin Beals
- Staff: 85.79 (FTE)
- Grades: 9–12
- Enrollment: 1,899 (2026–27)
- Student to teacher ratio: 22.14
- Colors: Navy and kelly green
- Slogan: "Preparing All Students to Succeed"
- Athletics: NCHSAA 7A
- Athletics conference: Southern Carolina 6A/7A
- Mascot: Warriors
- Rivals: Cuthbertson High School, Marvin Ridge High School
- Website: whs.ucpsnc.org

Weddington High School (WHS) is a public high school located east of Weddington, North Carolina (with a Matthews mailing address) as part of Union County Public Schools. As of August 2025, the school has been operating under the leadership of principal Kevin Beals. Weddington's important feeder schools, Weddington Elementary and Weddington Middle, are located on the same campus as the high school. Other feeder schools include Antioch Elementary, in Matthews/Indian Trail, and Wesley Chapel Elementary, in Monroe. WHS mainly serves Weddington, Wesley Chapel and the Union County portion of Matthews. It also has some students from western Monroe.

== Academics ==
As of 2024, Weddington had one of the highest graduation rate of seniors in the state of North Carolina, with the graduation rate of 98%.

Weddington is an Honors School of Excellence with high growth. To be recognized as an Honors School of Excellence, a school must have 90% or above of their composite End of Course Test scores above grade level. Weddington's test scores are the highest in Union County.

Weddington High School was on Newsweek magazine's "2013 America's Best High Schools" list. Weddington ranked 470th out of 2000 national schools. There are over 18,000 high schools in the United States, placing Weddington in the top three percent.

== Athletics ==
Weddington is a member of the North Carolina High School Athletic Association (NCHSAA) and are classified as a 7A school. The school is a part of the Southern Carolina 6A/7A Conference. Weddington's school colors are navy and kelly green, and its team name is the Warriors. Listed below are the different sports that Weddington offers for its students:

- Baseball
- Basketball
- Competition Cheerleading
- Cross Country
- Football
- Golf
- Lacrosse
- Soccer
- Softball
- Swimming
- Tennis
- Indoor/Outdoor Track & Field
- Volleyball
- Wrestling

== Programs ==
The Weddington High School marching band's 2013–14 director, Jill Brooks, was selected as the recipient of the 2013–14 American School Band Directors Association Outstanding Potential Award. The band was also highlighted in an issue of Appleseed Magazine for showing the power of music along with the levels of hard work and enthusiasm required to exist in a marching band.

As of 2013, Weddington provides its students with a Marine Corps JROTC program. The program has won two over-all awards from Union County drill meets, along with a host of other drill awards in its first two years. In May 2017, the MJROTC Women's Athletic Team finished 3rd in the National Competition, held in San Diego, California.

== Notable alumni ==
- Ayesha Curry, actress, author, television personality
- Keith Duncan, former All-American football kicker for the Iowa Hawkeyes
- Darius Kilgo, former NFL defensive lineman and two-time Super Bowl champion
- Malik Mustapha, NFL safety for the San Francisco 49ers
- Will Shipley, NFL running back, Super Bowl LIX champion with the Philadelphia Eagles
- Stephanie Watts, WNBA player
