= Stephanie Watts =

American basketball player (born 1997)

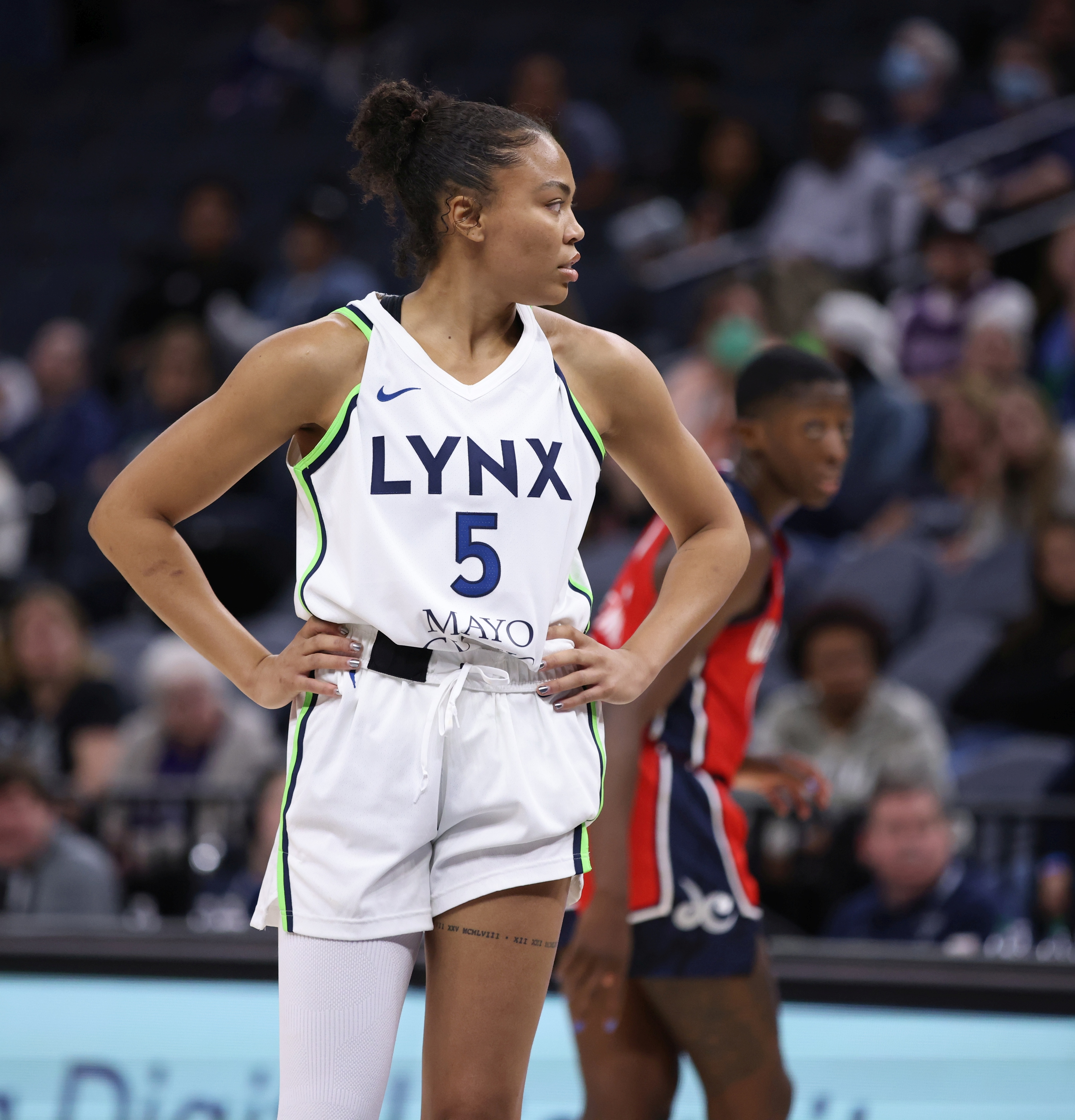

Personal information
- Born: April 12, 1997 (age 29)
- Listed height: 5 ft 11 in (1.80 m)

Career information
- High school: Weddington (Matthews, North Carolina)
- College: North Carolina (2015–19), (2020–21); USC (2019–20)
- WNBA draft: 2021: 1st round, 10th overall pick
- Drafted by: Los Angeles Sparks
- Position: Guard
- Number: 5

Career history
- 2021: Chicago Sky
- 2021–present: Sydney Uni Flames
- 2023-present: Tokomanawa Queens

Career highlights
- ACC Rookie of the Year (2016); ACC All-Freshman Team (2016); McDonald's All-American (2015); North Carolina Miss Basketball (2015)
- Stats at Basketball Reference

Stephanie Courtney Watts (born April 12, 1997) is an American professional basketball player. She played briefly for the Chicago Sky of the Women's National Basketball Association (WNBA). She was drafted by the Los Angeles Sparks in the first round of the 2021 WNBA draft and was traded to Chicago during the 2021 season.

== High school career ==
Watts is from Wesley Chapel, North Carolina and attended Weddington High School. She was named a McDonald's All-American and was North Carolina's Gatorade Player of the Year. She was a five-star recruit going into college and was ranked the No. 21 player overall in her recruiting class.

== College career ==
She started her college career at the University of North Carolina before transferring to the University of Southern California as a graduate. She returned to UNC as a sixth-year transfer to finish a graduate degree.

Watts was a three-year starter during her first stint at UNC, when she was named ACC Freshman of the Year. She was also named to the All-ACC second team that year. She also set a UNC freshman record for three pointers made. She crossed the 1,000 career points mark as a junior.

=== North Carolina and Southern California statistics ===
Ratios
Year	Team	GP	FG%	3P%	FT%	RBG	APG	BPG	SPG	PPG
2015-16	North Carolina	32	36.0%	29.2%	71.3%	7.22	2.50	1.38	1.41	14.72
2016-17	North Carolina	26	39.2%	32.5%	65.1%	7.89	2.19	1.19	2.04	16.85
2018-19	North Carolina	27	41.5%	37.3%	66.0%	5.48	3.11	1.00	1.89	15.22
2019-20	Southern California	4	39.4%	31.6%	90.0%	6.00	1.50	1.75	1.00	10.25
2020-21	North Carolina	23	38.5%	30.5%	85.9%	5.39	3.09	0.83	1.74	11.96
Career		112	38.7%	32.4%	72.8%	6.54	2.66	1.14	1.72	14.61

Totals
Year	Team	GP	FG	FGA	3P	3PA	FT	FTA	REB	A	BK	ST	PTS
2015-16	North Carolina	32	159	442	76	260	77	108	231	80	44	45	471
2016-17	North Carolina	26	158	403	81	249	41	63	205	57	31	53	438
2018-19	North Carolina	27	147	354	82	220	35	53	148	84	27	51	411
2019-20	Southern California	4	13	33	6	19	9	10	24	6	7	4	41
2020-21	North Carolina	23	92	239	36	118	55	64	124	71	19	40	275
Career		112	569	1471	281	866	217	298	732	298	128	193	1636

== Professional career ==
Watts became the highest UNC player selected in the WNBA Draft since La'Tangela Atkinson in 2006. She is the 21st player from the program to be selected and the fourth Top Ten pick.

== WNBA career statistics ==
Legend
GP	Games played	GS	Games started	MPG	Minutes per game	RPG	Rebounds per game
APG	Assists per game	SPG	Steals per game	BPG	Blocks per game	PPG	Points per game
TO	Turnovers per game	FG%	Field-goal percentage	3P%	3-point field-goal percentage	FT%	Free-throw percentage
**Bold**	Career best	°	League leader

=== Regular season ===
Year	Team	GP	GS	MPG	FG%	3P%	FT%	RPG	APG	SPG	BPG	TO	PPG
2021	Chicago	6	0	14.0	.211	.100	.750	3.7	0.5	0.5	0.3	1.3	2.5
Career	1 year, 1 team	6	0	14.0	.211	.100	.750	3.7	0.5	0.5	0.3	1.3	2.5
