= 2021 WNBA Finals =

Championship series of the 2021 WNBA season

Team	Coach	Wins
Chicago Sky	James Wade	3
Phoenix Mercury	Sandy Brondello	1
- Dates: October 10 – 17
- MVP: Kahleah Copper (Chicago Sky)
- Hall of Famers: Sky: Candace Parker (2026)
- Eastern finals: Chicago Sky defeated Connecticut Sun 3–1 (Note: the semifinal rounds as of 2016 were not divided by conference)
- Western finals: Phoenix Mercury defeated Las Vegas Aces 3–2

The 2021 WNBA Finals (branded as the WNBA Finals 2021 presented by YouTube TV for sponsorship reasons) was the best-of-five championship series for the 2021 season of the Women's National Basketball Association (WNBA). The finals featured the fifth-seeded Phoenix Mercury facing off against the sixth-seeded Chicago Sky, a rematch of the 2014 Finals. The Sky defeated the Mercury in 4 games, winning their first WNBA Championship, as well as Chicago's first professional basketball championship since 1998.

== Road to the Finals ==
=== Standings ===
#	Team	W	L	PCT	GB	Conf.	Home	Road	Cup
1	**x** – Connecticut Sun	26	6	.813	–	12–3	15–1	11–5	9–1
2	**x** – Las Vegas Aces	24	8	.750	2	11–4	13–3	11–5	6–4
3	**x** – Minnesota Lynx	22	10	.688	4	10–5	13–3	9–7	7–3
4	**x** – Seattle Storm	21	11	.656	5	9–6	11–5	10–6	8–2
5	**x** – Phoenix Mercury	19	13	.594	7	6–9	7–9	12–4	5–5
6	**x** – Chicago Sky	16	16	.500	10	10–5	6–10	10–6	6–4
7	**x** – Dallas Wings	14	18	.438	12	7–8	7–9	7–9	3–7
8	**x** – New York Liberty	12	20	.375	14	6–9	7–9	5–11	5–5
9	**e** – Washington Mystics	12	20	.375	14	7–8	8–8	4–12	4–6
10	**e** – Los Angeles Sparks	12	20	.375	14	2–13	8–8	4–12	1–9
11	**e** – Atlanta Dream	8	24	.250	18	6–9	4–12	4–12	4–6
12	**e** – Indiana Fever	6	26	.188	20	4–11	4–12	2–14	2–8

Notes

(#) – League Standing
x – Clinched playoff berth
e – Eliminated from playoff contention
Source: Overall standings and Commissioner's Cup Standings

=== Playoffs ===
**First round** single elimination Sept. 23
**5**	**Phoenix Mercury**	**83**
8	New York Liberty	82
**6**	**Chicago Sky**	**81**
7	Dallas Wings	64

**Second round** single elimination Sept. 26
4	Seattle Storm	80
**5**	**Phoenix Mercury**	**85^{OT}**
3	Minnesota Lynx	76
**6**	**Chicago Sky**	**89**

**Semifinals**; Best-of-5; Sept. 28 – Oct. 8
2	Las Vegas Aces	2
**5**	**Phoenix Mercury**	**3**
1	Connecticut Sun	1
**6**	**Chicago Sky**	**3**

**Finals**; Best-of-5; Oct. 10 – 17
5	Phoenix Mercury	1
**6**	**Chicago Sky**	**3**

Note: Teams re-seeded after each round.

- **Bold** – Game or series winner
- Italic – Team with home-court advantage

== Summary ==
This finals was only the second time since the WNBA switched playoff formats in 2016 that two teams from different conferences met in the finals. The previous time was in 2018, when the Washington Mystics faced off against the Seattle Storm. This finals is also the first time since the format switch where the number one seed did not make the finals. The finals was the first time since the format switch that a team that was not the #1 or #2 seed won the championship. Additionally, the match up between the Mercury and Sky was a rematch of the 2014 WNBA Finals. It also marked the third time both cities contested a professional basketball championship, as the Bulls and Suns met in the 1993 NBA Finals, with the Bulls winning 4–2.

The Phoenix Mercury qualified for the finals after finishing fifth in the regular season standings. They defeated the New York Liberty in the First Round, the defending champions Seattle Storm in the Second Round, and the second seeded Las Vegas Aces 3–2 in the Semifinals. The Mercury are the third non-top two seed to make the finals.

The Chicago Sky qualified for the finals after finishing sixth in the regular season standings. They defeated the Dallas Wings in the First Round, the Minnesota Lynx in the Second Round, and the top seeded Connecticut Sun 3–1 in the Semifinals. The Sky are only the second non-top two seed to make the finals. The Mystics in 2018 were the third seed. The sixth-seeded Sky are also the lowest seed to make the finals under the new playoff format. The Sky are the third team to qualify for the finals after having a regular season record of .500 or lower. This was second finals appearance in franchise history for the Sky, with the other coming in 2014.

During the regular season, the teams faced off three times, with the Mercury winning all three games.

=== Game 1 ===
The series began in Phoenix, in front of a bumper crowd of over 10,000 fans. The Mercury gave the fans something to cheer, winning the first quarter by five points, 25–20. However, the Sky came roaring back in the second quarter to quiet the crowd. The Sky won the quarter by sixteen points, 26–10, and took an eleven-point lead into half time. Quarter three was tightly contested, but the Mercury could not reduce the deficit. The Sky won the quarter by two points, 28–26, and took a thirteen-point lead into the final period. The Sky also won the final quarter by a point, 17–16, and therefore the game, by a total of fourteen points.

The Sky were led by Kahleah Copper who scored 21 points and recorded 10 rebounds to complete a double-double. Guard Courtney Vandersloot also had a double-double, with 12 points and 11 assists. Allie Quigley, Candace Parker, Stefanie Dolson, and Azurá Stevens all scored in double figures for the Sky. However, no other Sky players scored in the game. The Mercury were led by Brittney Griner with 20 points, Diana Taurasi with 17, and Skylar Diggins-Smith with 15.

ABC, SN/NBA TV Canada

October 10
3:00 p.m.

Box Score

#5 Phoenix Mercury 77, #6 Chicago Sky 91
Scoring by quarter: 25–20, 10–26, 26–28, 16–17
Pts: Brittney Griner (20); Rebs: Brianna Turner (9); Asts: Skylar Diggins-Smith (4)	Pts: Kahleah Copper (21); Rebs: Kahleah Copper (10); Asts: Courtney Vandersloot (11)
Chicago lead series, 1-0

Footprint Center
Attendance: 10,191
Referees: Eric Brewton, Cheryl Flores, Isaac Barnett, Tiffany Bird

=== Game 2 ===
Over 13,000 fans were in attendance for Game 2 in Phoenix, but the home team couldn't take advantage of the home crowd in the first quarter. The Sky took the opening period by six points, 26–20. However, the Mercury came back in the second and won the quarter by six points, 20–14. The game was tied going into halftime, and the Sky came out strong in the third quarter and won by six points, 23–17. The Mercury won the fourth quarter by six points, 22–16 to force overtime. The six point trend was broken as the Mercury won the overtime period by five points, 12–7.

The Mercury had four players score in double figures, led by Brittney Griner with 29 points. Diana Taurasi scored 20 points, Skylar Diggins-Smith added 13 points, and Shey Peddy added 10 points from the bench. The Sky also had four players score in double figures, led by Courtney Vandersloot with 20 points. Allie Quigley scored 19 points, Kahleah Copper scored 15, and Candace Parker rounded out the double digit scorers with 13 points. Five players also recorded nine rebounds in the game, leaving three players one rebound shy of a double-double.

ESPN, TSN2

October 13
9:00 p.m. EDT

Box Score

#5 Phoenix Mercury 91, #6 Chicago Sky 86 (OT)
Scoring by quarter: 20–26, 20–14, 17–23, 22–16, Overtime: 12–7
Pts: Brittney Griner (29); Rebs: Brianna Turner/Brittney Griner (9); Asts: Skylar Diggins-Smith (12)	Pts: Courtney Vandersloot (20); Rebs: Kahleah Copper/Candace Parker/Azurá Stevens (9); Asts: Courtney Vandersloot (14)
Series tied, 1-1

Footprint Center
Attendance: 13,685
Referees: Roy Gulbeyan, Tim Greene, Tiffany Bird, Tiara Cruse

=== Game 3 ===
The series moved to Chicago for Game Three and the Sky took advantage to start the game, winning the first quarter by nine points, 20–11. The Sky continued their dominance into the second quarter, winning the quarter by thirteen points, 26–13. The Sky then took a twenty two point lead into halftime. The halftime lead tied the largest ever in the WNBA Finals. With such a big lead, the Sky did not let up, winning the third quarter by two points and the fourth quarter by twelve points to win the game by thirty six points.

The Sky had three players score in double digits, led by Kahleah Copper with 22 points. Candace Parker scored 13 and Diamond DeShields added 11 off the bench. Courtney Vandersloot recorded 10 assists. The Mercury only had one player score in double digits, Brittney Griner with 16 points.

ESPN2, TSN2

October 15
9:00 p.m.

Box Score

#6 Chicago Sky 86, #5 Phoenix Mercury 50
Scoring by quarter: 20–11, 26–13, 16–14, 24–12
Pts: Kahleah Copper (22); Rebs: Azurá Stevens (6); Asts: Courtney Vandersloot (10)	Pts: Brittney Griner (16); Rebs: Brianna Turner (7); Asts: Skylar Diggins-Smith (3)
Chicago lead series, 2-1

Wintrust Arena
Attendance: 10,387
Referees: Michael Price, Billy Smith, Maj Forsberg, Isaac Barnett

=== Game 4 ===
Game four began with a close first quarter that Phoenix won by three points, 28–25. The Mercury kept their momentum going and won the second quarter by four points, 16–12, to take a seven-point lead into half time. They expanded on that lead by winning the third quarter by two points, 19–17. However, the Sky would make a comeback in the fourth quarter, winning the quarter by fifteen points to erase the Mercury's nine point lead. The explosive quarter saw the Sky win the game by six points, and secure their first WNBA Title.

The Sky had four players score in double digits, led by Allie Quigley who scored 26 points. Candace Parker added 16 points, and both Kahleah Copper and Courtney Vandersloot scored 10 points to round out the double digit scorers. Parker and Vandersloot also recorded double-doubles. Parker by virtue of recording 13 rebounds and Vandersloot by way of 15 assists. The Mercury had three players score in double digits, led by Brittney Griner with 28 points. Diana Taurasi and Skylar Diggins-Smith both scored 16 points to round out the double digit scorers, while Sophie Cunningham added 3 points and 3 rebounds for Phoenix as well.

ESPN, SN/NBA TV Canada

October 17
3:00 p.m.

Box Score

#6 Chicago Sky 80, #5 Phoenix Mercury 74
Scoring by quarter: 25–28, 12–16, 17–19, 26–11
Pts: Allie Quigley (26); Rebs: Candace Parker (13); Asts: Courtney Vandersloot (15)	Pts: Brittney Griner (28); Rebs: Brianna Turner (12); Asts: Skylar Diggins-Smith (8)
Chicago wins WNBA Finals, 3-1

Wintrust Arena
Attendance: 10,387
Referees: Roy Gulbeyan, Eric Brewton, Tiara Cruse, Isaac Barnett

Following their victory, the city of Chicago held a huge parade to celebrate.

== Team rosters ==
2021 Phoenix Mercury roster
Players
Coaches

Pos.	No.	Nat.	Name	Height	Weight	DOB	From	Yrs
G	9	(United States)	Cunningham, Sophie	6' 1" (1.85m)	170 lb (77kg)	1996-08-16	Missouri	2
G	4	(United States)	Diggins-Smith, Skylar	5' 9" (1.75m)	145 lb (66kg)	1996-08-16	Notre Dame	7
C	42	(United States)	Griner, Brittney	6' 9" (2.06m)	205 lb (93kg)	1990-10-18	Baylor	8
G	14	(France)	Hartley, Bria	5' 8" (1.73m)	148 lb (67kg)	1992-09-30	Connecticut	7
G	0	(Canada)	Nurse, Kia (injured)	6' 0" (1.83m)	168 lb (76kg)	1996-02-22	Connecticut	3
G	5	(United States)	Peddy, Shey	5' 7" (1.7m)	147 lb (67kg)	1988-10-28	Temple	2
F	11	(Australia)	Smith, Alanna	6' 4" (1.93m)	180 lb (82kg)	1996-09-10	Stanford	2
G/F	3	(United States)	Taurasi, Diana	6' 0" (1.83m)	163 lb (74kg)	1982-06-11	Connecticut	16
F	21	(United States)	Turner, Brianna	6' 3" (1.91m)	170 lb (77kg)	1996-07-05	Notre Dame	2
C	1	(Czech Republic)	Vaughn, Kia	6' 4" (1.93m)	205 lb (93kg)	1987-01-24	Rutgers	11
F	2	(United States)	Walker, Megan	6' 1" (1.85m)	175 lb (79kg)	1998-11-23	Connecticut	1

Head coach
(Australia) Sandy Brondello (Western Sydney)
Assistant coaches
(United States) Julie Hairgrove (Arizona)
(United States) Chasity Melvin (NC State)
Athletic trainer
(United States) Hannah Breck (Boston University)
Strength and conditioning coach
(United States) Derrick Nillissen (Iowa Wesleyan)

Legend

- (C) Team captain
- (DP) Unsigned draft pick
- (FA) Free agent
- (S) Suspended
- Injured

2021 Chicago Sky roster
Players
Coaches

Pos.	No.	Nat.	Name	Height	Weight	DOB	From	Yrs
G	7	(United States)	Brown, Lexie	5' 9" (1.75m)	162 lb (73kg)	1994-10-27	Duke	3
G/F	2	(United States)	Copper, Kahleah	6' 1" (1.85m)	165 lb (75kg)	1994-08-28	Rutgers	5
G	1	(United States)	DeShields, Diamond	6' 1" (1.85m)	172 lb (78kg)	1995-03-05	Tennessee	3
C	31	(United States)	Dolson, Stefanie	6' 5" (1.96m)	235 lb (107kg)	1992-01-08	Connecticut	7
G	11	(United States)	Evans, Dana	5' 6" (1.68m)	145 lb (66kg)	1998-08-01	Louisville	R
F	24	(United States)	Hebard, Ruthy	6' 4" (1.93m)	190 lb (86kg)	1998-04-28	Oregon	1
F/C	45	(Spain)	Ndour, Astou	6' 5" (1.96m)	162 lb (73kg)	1994-08-22	Spain	5
F/C	3	(United States)	Parker, Candace	6' 4" (1.93m)	184 lb (83kg)	1986-04-19	Tennessee	12
G	14	(Hungary)	Quigley, Allie	5' 10" (1.78m)	142 lb (64kg)	1986-06-20	DePaul	12
F/C	30	(United States)	Stevens, Azurá	6' 6" (1.98m)	180 lb (82kg)	1996-02-01	Connecticut	3
G	22	(Hungary)	Vandersloot, Courtney	5' 8" (1.73m)	137 lb (62kg)	1989-02-08	Gonzaga	10

Head coach
(United States) James Wade (Kennesaw State)
Assistant coaches
(United States) Tonya Edwards (Tennessee)
(Germany) Olaf Lange
(Turkey) Emre Vatansever
Athletic trainer
(United States) Meghan Lockerby
Strength and conditioning coach
(United States) Ann Crosby (Western Michigan)

Legend

- (C) Team captain
- (DP) Unsigned draft pick
- (FA) Free agent
- (S) Suspended
- Injured
