= 2021 WNBA Commissioner's Cup =

WNBA Commissioner's Cup

2021 WNBA Commissioner's Cup Game
Cup Final
Connecticut Sun	Seattle Storm
(9–1)	(8–2)
57	79
Head coach: Curt Miller	Head coach: Noelle Quinn
	1	2	3	4	Total
Connecticut Sun	18	17	5	17	57
Seattle Storm	28	18	22	11	79
- Date: August 12, 2021
- Venue: Footprint Center, Phoenix, Arizona
- MVP: Breanna Stewart (Seattle)
- Referees: Eric Brewton, Cheryl Flores, Tiara Cruse
- Attendance: 5,006

United States TV coverage
- Network: Amazon Prime
- Announcers: Lisa Byington (play-by-play); Lisa Leslie (analyst)

The 2021 WNBA Commissioner's Cup was the WNBA's first ever Commissioner's Cup in league history. The Cup Final featured the top Eastern Conference Cup Connecticut Sun facing off against the top Western Conference team Seattle Storm. The Sun came into the Cup Final with a Cup record of 9–1 against fellow Eastern Conference teams, while the Storm entered with a 8–2 record against their Western Conference counterparts.

Led by Cup MVP Breanna Stewart, Seattle won the game by double-digits, claiming the inaugural Cup Final Title.

== Road to the Cup Final ==
The Commissioner's Cup starts by designating a portion of regular-season games—10 games per team—as counting toward Cup play. The team from each conference with the top record in designated "Cup games" then compete for the Commissioner's Cup title and a special prize pool. Cup games are the first home game and first road game each team plays against its five conference rivals.

=== Standings ===
Eastern Conference
Pos	Team	Pld	W	L
1	Connecticut Sun	10	9	1
2	Chicago Sky	10	6	4
3	New York Liberty	10	5	5
4	Atlanta Dream	10	4	6
5	Washington Mystics	10	4	6
6	Indiana Fever	10	2	8

Western Conference
Pos	Team	Pld	W	L
1	Seattle Storm	10	8	2
2	Minnesota Lynx	10	7	3
3	Las Vegas Aces	10	6	4
4	Phoenix Mercury	10	5	5
5	Dallas Wings	10	3	7
6	Los Angeles Sparks	10	1	9

== Game Summary ==
Coming out of the Olympics Break, Seattle showed no signs of fatigue with having five players playing in the Olympics. They worked well together and jumped out to an early lead. The Sun battled back together down 10 after the first quarter. The game was back-and-forth in the second quarter, and the Sun trailed by just five with 4:50 to play in the second and would have cut their deficit to eight at the break had DeWanna Bonner's half court make just after the buzzer counted. It wasn't until the Storm won the third 22–5 that the game was truly out of reach.

Seattle scored the first eight points out of the break with four coming from Sue Bird, who ended the second with a trey. The Storm went on to lead by as many as 31 and Bird finished with 10 points and five assists. The third member of Seattle's big three, Jewell Loyd, notched 16 points and three assists.

Amazon Prime

August 12
7:00pm ET

Report

Seattle Storm 79, Connecticut Sun 57
Scoring by quarter: 28–18, 18–17, 22–5, 11–17
Pts: Breanna Stewart (17); Rebs: Mercedes Russell (7); Asts: Sue Bird (5)	Pts: Bonner; Hiedeman 11; Rebs: Brionna Jones (11); Asts: Jasmine Thomas (3)

Footprint Center
Attendance: 5,006
Referees: Eric Brewton, Cheryl Flores, Tiara Cruse

== Team rosters ==
Seattle Storm roster
Players
Coaches

Pos.	No.	Nat.	Name	Height	Weight	DOB	From	Yrs
G	10	(United States)	Bird, Sue	5' 9" (1.75m)	150 lb (68kg)	1980-10-16	Connecticut	17
F	22	(United States)	Burdick, Cierra	6' 2" (1.88m)	172 lb (78kg)	1993-09-30	Tennessee	4
G	8	(United States)	Burke, Kennedy	6' 1" (1.85m)	182 lb (83kg)	1997-02-14	UCLA	2
G	21	(United States)	Canada, Jordin	5' 6" (1.68m)	135 lb (61kg)	1995-08-11	UCLA	3
G	24	(United States)	Loyd, Jewell	5' 10" (1.78m)	148 lb (67kg)	1993-10-05	Notre Dame	6
C	13	(Australia)	Magbegor, Ezi	6' 4" (1.93m)	176 lb (80kg)	1999-08-13	Australia	1
G	11	(Russia)	Prince, Epiphanny	5' 9" (1.75m)	179 lb (81kg)	1988-01-11	Rutgers	11
C	2	(United States)	Russell, Mercedes	6' 6" (1.98m)	195 lb (88kg)	1995-07-27	Tennessee	3
F	33	(United States)	Samuelson, Katie Lou	6' 3" (1.91m)	163 lb (74kg)	1997-06-13	Connecticut	2
F	30	(United States)	Stewart, Breanna	6' 4" (1.93m)	170 lb (77kg)	1994-08-27	Connecticut	4
F	7	(Australia)	Talbot, Stephanie	6' 2" (1.88m)	192 lb (87kg)	1994-06-15	Australia	3
G	23	(United States)	Williams, Kiana	5' 8" (1.73m)	135 lb (61kg)	1999-04-09	Stanford	R

Head coach
(Bulgaria) Noelle Quinn (UCLA)
Assistant coaches
(United States) Gary Kloppenburg (UC San Diego)
(United States) Ryan Webb (Seattle)
(United States) Perry Huang (Fresno Pacific)
Athletic trainer
Caroline Durocher

Legend

- (C) Team captain
- (DP) Unsigned draft pick
- (FA) Free agent
- (S) Suspended
- Injured

WNBA roster page

East
ATL
CHI
CON
IND
NY
TOR
WAS
West
DAL
GS
LV
LA
MIN
PHO
POR
SEA

Connecticut Sun roster
Players
Coaches

Pos.	No.	Nat.	Name	Height	Weight	DOB	From	Yrs
G/F	24	(United States)	Bonner, DeWanna	6' 4" (1.93m)	143 lb (65kg)	1987-08-21	Auburn	11
G/F	21	(United States)	Carrington, DiJonai	5' 11" (1.8m)	175 lb (79kg)	1998-01-08	Baylor	R
G/F	3	(United States)	Charles, Kaila	6' 1" (1.85m)	167 lb (76kg)	1998-03-23	Maryland	1
G	2	(United States)	Hiedeman, Natisha	5' 8" (1.73m)	135 lb (61kg)	1997-02-10	Marquette	2
G	20	(United States)	January, Briann	5' 8" (1.73m)	144 lb (65kg)	1987-01-11	Arizona State	12
F	42	(United States)	Jones, Brionna	6' 3" (1.91m)	230 lb (104kg)	1995-12-18	Maryland	4
F	35	(Bosnia and Herzegovina)	Jones, Jonquel	6' 6" (1.98m)	190 lb (86kg)	1994-01-05	George Washington	4
F	4	(United States)	Jones, Stephanie	6' 3" (1.91m)	185 lb (84kg)	1998-07-10	Maryland	R
F	1	(United States)	Mompremier, Beatrice	6' 4" (1.93m)	190 lb (86kg)	1996-08-08	Miami (FL)	1
F	25	(United States)	Thomas, Alyssa (injured)	6' 2" (1.88m)	185 lb (84kg)	1992-04-12	Maryland	6
G	5	(United States)	Thomas, Jasmine	5' 9" (1.75m)	143 lb (65kg)	1989-09-30	Duke	9

Head coach
(United States) Curt Miller (Baldwin Wallace)
Assistant coaches
(United States) Brandi Poole
(United States) Chris Koclanes
Athletic trainer
(United States) Nicole Alexander
Strength and conditioning coach
(United States) Analisse Rios

Legend

- (C) Team captain
- (DP) Unsigned draft pick
- (FA) Free agent
- (S) Suspended
- Injured

WNBA roster page

East
ATL
CHI
CON
IND
NY
TOR
WAS
West
DAL
GS
LV
LA
MIN
PHO
POR
SEA
