= 2021 WNBA All-Star Game =

Exhibition basketball game

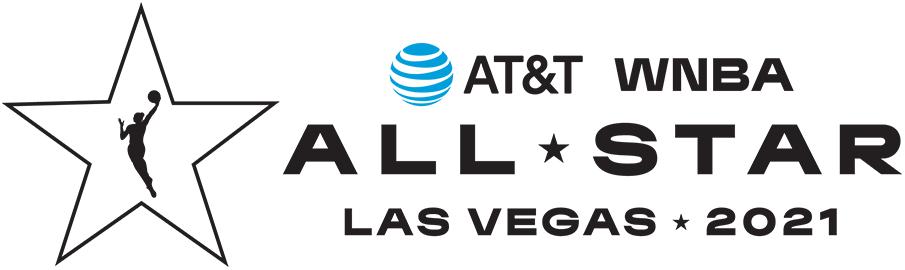
| | 1 | 2 | 3 | 4 | Total |
|---|---|---|---|---|---|
| Team USA | 28 | 15 | 23 | 19 | 85 |
| Team WNBA All-Stars | 25 | 19 | 22 | 27 | 93 |
- Date: July 14, 2021
- Arena: Michelob Ultra Arena
- City: Las Vegas, Nevada
- MVP: Arike Ogunbowale (Dallas Wings)
- Attendance: 5,175
- Network: United States: ESPN; Canada: TSN3/5/SN

WNBA All-Star Game
| < 2019 | 2022 > |

The 2021 WNBA All-Star Game was an exhibition basketball game played on July 14, 2021. The Las Vegas Aces hosted the WNBA All-Star Game for the second time. This game was the first since 2000 to be held in the same year as the Summer Olympic Games, as the WNBA did not hold All-Star Games in four previous Summer Olympic years.

== Rosters ==
=== Selection ===
On June 16, the WNBA announced that 2021 would have a similar roster selection process to the 2018 and 2019 All-Star games. Fans, WNBA players, head coaches, sports writers, and broadcasters would all be able to vote for All Stars. All groups could fill out a ballot of four guards and six front court players. Players and coaches could not vote for members of their own team. Voting began on June 15 at 2 p.m. EDT and ended on June 27 at 11:59 p.m. EDT. There were two days where fans could have their votes count twice, June 20 and June 27.

The voting was weighted as follows:

| Voting group | Vote weight |
|---|---|
| Fans | 50% |
| WNBA players | 25% |
| Sports media | 25% |

Players were not allowed to vote for their own teammates. The top 36 vote-getters would be selected as All-Stars. There will be a minimum of 9 backcourt players and 15 frontcourt players selected. Of these 36, WNBA Head Coaches will select 12 players to make up Team WNBA All-Stars. These twelve players will compete against members of the US Olympic Team. The WNBA All-Star roster was announced on June 30, 2021.

=== All-Star Pool ===
The players for the All-Star Game were selected by the voting process described above. Rosters were released on June 30, 2021.

Eastern Conference All-Stars
| Pos | Player | Team | No. of selections |
Players
| G | Ariel Atkins | Washington Mystics | 1 |
| G | Kahleah Copper | Chicago Sky | 1 |
| G | Courtney Vandersloot | Chicago Sky | 3 |
| G | Courtney Williams | Atlanta Dream | 1 |
| G/F | Betnijah Laney | New York Liberty | 1 |
| F | DeWanna Bonner | Connecticut Sun | 4 |
| F | Brionna Jones | Connecticut Sun | 1 |
| F/C | Jonquel Jones | Connecticut Sun | 3 |
| F/C | Candace Parker | Chicago Sky | 6 |
| C | Tina Charles | Washington Mystics | 8 |

Western Conference All-Stars
| Pos | Player | Team | No. of selections |
Players
| G | Sue Bird | Seattle Storm | 12 |
| G | Skylar Diggins-Smith | Phoenix Mercury | 5 |
| G | Chelsea Gray | Las Vegas Aces | 4 |
| G | Jewell Loyd | Seattle Storm | 3 |
| G | Arike Ogunbowale | Dallas Wings | 1 |
| G | Diana Taurasi | Phoenix Mercury | 10 |
| F | Napheesa Collier | Minnesota Lynx | 2 |
| F | Dearica Hamby | Las Vegas Aces | 1 |
| F | Satou Sabally | Dallas Wings | 1 |
| F | Breanna Stewart | Seattle Storm | 3 |
| F | A'ja Wilson | Las Vegas Aces | 3 |
| C | Liz Cambage | Las Vegas Aces | 4 |
| C | Sylvia Fowles | Minnesota Lynx | 7 |
| C | Brittney Griner | Phoenix Mercury | 7 |

=== All-Star Selections per team ===
Number of All-Star players per team
| Team | Number of players |
|---|---|
| Atlanta Dream | 1 |
| Chicago Sky | 3 |
| Connecticut Sun | 3 |
| Indiana Fever | 0 |
| New York Liberty | 1 |
| Washington Mystics | 2 |
| Dallas Wings | 2 |
| Las Vegas Aces | 4 |
| Los Angeles Sparks | 0 |
| Minnesota Lynx | 2 |
| Phoenix Mercury | 3 |
| Seattle Storm | 3 |

=== Final rosters ===
Team USA
| Pos | Player | Team | No. of selections |
Starters
| F | Breanna Stewart | Seattle Storm | 3 |
| F | A'ja Wilson | Las Vegas Aces | 3 |
| C | Brittney Griner | Phoenix Mercury | 7 |
| G | Jewell Loyd | Seattle Storm | 3 |
| G | Sue Bird | Seattle Storm | 12 |
Reserves
| G | Ariel Atkins | Washington Mystics | 1 |
| G | Skylar Diggins-Smith | Phoenix Mercury | 5 |
| G | Chelsea Gray | Las Vegas Aces | 4 |
| G | Diana Taurasi | Phoenix Mercury | 10 |
| F | Napheesa Collier | Minnesota Lynx | 2 |
| C | Tina Charles | Washington Mystics | 8 |
| C | Sylvia Fowles | Minnesota Lynx | 7 |
Head coach: Dawn Staley

Team WNBA
| Pos | Player | Team | No. of selections |
Starters
| F | DeWanna Bonner | Connecticut Sun | 4 |
| F/C | Jonquel Jones | Connecticut Sun | 3 |
| C | Candace Parker | Chicago Sky | 6 |
| G | Arike Ogunbowale | Dallas Wings | 1 |
| G | Courtney Vandersloot | Chicago Sky | 3 |
Reserves
| G | Kahleah Copper | Chicago Sky | 1 |
| G | Courtney Williams | Atlanta Dream | 1 |
| G/F | Betnijah Laney | New York Liberty | 1 |
| F | Dearica Hamby | Las Vegas Aces | 1 |
| F | Brionna Jones | Connecticut Sun | 1 |
| F | Satou Sabally | Dallas Wings | 1 |
| C | Liz Cambage | Las Vegas Aces | 4 |
Head coach: Lisa Leslie & Tina Thompson

Starters will be announced by the respective head coaches of the USA Basketball Women's National Team and Team WNBA.

== Game ==
ESPN, TSN3/5/SN

July 14, 2021
7:00 p.m. ET

Recap

Team USA 85, Team WNBA All-Star 93
Scoring by quarter: 28–25, 15–19, 23–22, 19–27
| Pts: Brittney Griner 17; Rebs: Sylvia Fowles 7 Asts: Sue Bird 8 | Pts: Arike Ogunbowale 26; Rebs: Jonquel Jones 14; Asts: Courtney Vandersloot 7 |

Michelob Ultra Arena, Las Vegas, Nevada
Attendance: 5,175
Referees: Kurt Walker, Jeffrey Smith, Angelica Suffern

== Three-Point Contest ==
On July 9, 2021, it was announced that a Three-Point Contest will be held during half time of the All-Star game. It was also announced that the Skills Challenge held in 2019 would not be held this year.

=== Rules ===
The Three-Point Shootout is a two-round, timed competition in which five shooting locations are positioned around the three-point arc. Four racks contain four WNBA balls (each worth one point) and one “money” ball (worth two points). The fifth station is a special “all money ball” rack, which each participant can place at any of the five locations. Every ball on this rack is worth two points. Two balls were placed on pedestals between racks 2 and 3 and racks 3 and 4. Each of these balls is worth three points. The players have one minute and ten seconds to shoot as many of the 27 balls as they can. The two competitors with the highest scores in the first round advance to the championship round.

=== Results ===
| Position | Player | From | 2021 Season 3-point statistics | | | 1st Round | 2nd Round |
| Position | Player | From | Made | Attempted | Percent | 1st Round | 2nd Round |
|---|---|---|---|---|---|---|---|
| G | Allie Quigley | Chicago | 24 | 59 | 40.7% | 28 | 28 |
| F | Jonquel Jones | Connecticut | 31 | 71 | 43.7% | 27 | 24 |
| G | Sami Whitcomb | New York | 56 | 128 | 43.8% | 26 | – |
| G | Jewell Loyd | Seattle | 40 | 107 | 37.4% | 18 | – |
