= Cierra Burdick =

American basketball player (born 1993)

Free agent
- Position: Forward

Personal information
- Born: September 30, 1993 (age 33) Charlotte, North Carolina, U.S.
- Listed height: 6 ft 2 in (1.88 m)
- Listed weight: 172 lb (78 kg)

Career information
- High school: David W. Butler (Matthews, North Carolina)
- College: Tennessee (2011–2015)
- WNBA draft: 2015: 2nd round, 14th overall pick
- Drafted by: Los Angeles Sparks
- Playing career: 2015–present

Career history
- 2015–2016: Atlanta Dream
- 2017: New York Liberty
- 2017–2018, 2020: San Antonio Stars / Las Vegas Aces
- 2021: Phoenix Mercury
- 2021: Minnesota Lynx
- 2021: Seattle Storm

Career highlights
- Commissioner's Cup champion (2021); First-team All-SEC (2015); McDonald's All-American (2011); North Carolina Miss Basketball (2011)
- Stats at WNBA.com
- Stats at Basketball Reference
Medals
Women's basketball
Representing the United States
FIBA Under-19 World Cup
Gold medal – first place	2011 Chile	Team
FIBA Under-17 World Cup
Gold medal – first place	2010 France	Team
FIBA Americas U16 Championship
Gold medal – first place	2009 Mexico	Team
Women's 3x3 basketball
Representing the United States
Olympic Games
Bronze medal – third place	2024 Paris	Team
FIBA 3x3 World Cup
Gold medal – first place	2023 Vienna	Team
Gold medal – first place	2014 Russia	Team
Pan American Games
Gold medal – first place	2023 Santiago	Team
FIBA 3x3 AmeriCup
Gold medal – first place	2021 Miami	Team

Cassidie Cierra Burdick (born September 30, 1993) is an American basketball player who is currently playing for Valencia Basket Club.

== High school ==
Burdick graduated from David W. Butler High School in 2011. She was one of five finalists for the Naismith National High School Player of the Year award in 2011.

== College ==
Burdick graduated from The University of Tennessee in 2015. Burdick was named a UT Torchbearer in 2015.

=== Tennessee statistics ===
Legend
GP	Games played	GS	Games started	MPG	Minutes per game
FG%	Field goal percentage	3P%	3-point field goal percentage	FT%	Free throw percentage
RPG	Rebounds per game	APG	Assists per game	SPG	Steals per game
BPG	Blocks per game	PPG	Points per game	**Bold**	Career high

Year	Team	GP	Points	FG%	3P%	FT%	RPG	APG	SPG	BPG	PPG
2011–12	Tennessee	**36**	165	**46.3%**	33.3%	76.1%	2.8	0.9	0.3	0.6	4.6
2012–13	Tennessee	27	227	45.3%	35.3%	76.6%	6.6	1.5	0.9	**0.8**	8.4
2013–14	Tennessee	35	306	39.3%	36.0%	75.9%	7.3	2.0	0.6	0.4	8.7
2014–15	Tennessee	34	**374**	43.7%	**37.1%**	**82.5%**	**7.6**	**2.7**	**1.1**	0.5	**11.0**
Career		132	1072	43.0%	36.0%	78.4%	6.0	1.8	0.7	0.6	8.1

== WNBA ==
Burdick was drafted by the Los Angeles Sparks in 2015, but was cut before the season began. She then signed with the Atlanta Dream. Her career includes stints for the New York Liberty and the San Antonio Stars, before the latter was sold and moved to become the Las Vegas Aces. On July 31, 2020, Burdick signed a contract with the Aces to resume her WNBA career.

== WNBA career statistics ==
Legend
GP	Games played	GS	Games started	MPG	Minutes per game	RPG	Rebounds per game
APG	Assists per game	SPG	Steals per game	BPG	Blocks per game	PPG	Points per game
TO	Turnovers per game	FG%	Field-goal percentage	3P%	3-point field-goal percentage	FT%	Free-throw percentage
**Bold**	Career best	°	League leader

=== Regular season ===
Year	Team	GP	GS	MPG	FG%	3P%	FT%	RPG	APG	SPG	BPG	TO	PPG
2015	Atlanta	11	**4**	**18.9**	.425	.000	**.875**	**3.2**	1.2	**0.9**	**0.5**	0.8	4.4
2016	Atlanta	8	0	3.6	.125	.000	.500	0.5	0.0	0.0	0.0	0.3	0.4
2017	New York	6	0	6.0	.545	**1.000**	.000	1.0	0.7	0.2	0.2	0.7	2.2
2017	San Antonio	4	0	12.5	**.818**	.000	.000	1.5	**1.3**	0.3	0.0	1.0	**4.5**
2020	Las Vegas	**13**	0	2.2	.286	.000	.000	0.4	0.2	0.0	0.0	0.1	0.3
2021	Phoenix	4	0	4.8	.500	.000	.000	1.8	0.8	0.3	0.3	0.3	1.0
2021	Minnesota	3	0	3.3	.667	.000	.667	0.3	0.0	0.0	0.0	0.0	2.0
2021	Seattle	7	0	5.0	.250	.000	.500	1.7	0.4	0.3	0.3	0.3	0.4
Career	5 years, 6 teams	56	4	7.4	.455	.333	.783	1.4	0.5	0.3	0.2	0.4	1.8

=== Playoffs ===
Year	Team	GP	GS	MPG	FG%	3P%	FT%	RPG	APG	SPG	BPG	TO	PPG
2020	Las Vegas	4	0	4.8	.286	.000	.000	1.0	0.5	0.0	0.0	0.0	1.0
Career	5 years, 6 teams	4	0	4.8	.286	.000	.000	1.0	0.5	0.0	0.0	0.0	1.0

== International basketball ==
Burdick was a member of the following teams. In total she won four gold medals.

- 2010 FIBA U17 World Championship - Gold medal
- 2009 FIBA Americas U16 Championship - Gold medal
- 2009 FIBA Americas U16 Championship for Women - Gold medal
- 2011 USA Basketball U19 World Championship Team
- 2010 USA U17 World Championship
- 2009 USA U16 National Team

At the 2024 Summer Olympics, she won a bronze medal as a member of the United States women's national 3x3 team.

== Personal life ==
Burdick's great grandfather Lloyd Burdick played for the Chicago Bears. She has a younger brother and two younger sisters. She grew up in Charlotte, NC.
