= 2021 Seattle Storm season =

- Head coach: Noelle Quinn (since May 30); Dan Hughes (before May 30)
- Arena: Angel of the Winds Arena

Results
- Record: 21–11 (.656)
- Place: 3rd (Western)
- Playoff finish: 4th seed; Lost in Second Round to Phoenix Mercury

The 2021 Seattle Storm season is the franchise's 22nd season in the Women's National Basketball Association (WNBA). Due to ongoing renovations at the Climate Pledge Arena, the Storm played their home games at the Angel of the Winds Arena in Everett, Washington.

On May 30, 2021, head coach Dan Hughes announced his retirement; the Storm named associate head coach Noelle Quinn as his permanent replacement.

The Storm started the season with a finals rematch against the Las Vegas Aces. They split the series at home, 1–1. The rest of the opening month went smoother for the team, as that would be their only loss in May. Two of their wins game in overtime as well. The strong start continued into June, with the team winning their first two games of the month to extend their winning streak to six games. That streak was snapped on June 6, with a one point loss to Dallas. A five game winning streak followed the loss, but it was broken by the Storm losing their last two games of June to finish the month 7–3. The team won four of their five games in July, with their only loss coming away against Phoenix. They took a 16–5 record into the Olympic break.

The first game back from the Olympic break was the inaugural Commissioner's Cup Final, which the Storm won. The game was a dominating 79-57 victory over the Connecticut Sun. Breanna Stewart was named MVP of the game. However, she would not play in their next two games, which the Storm would both lose. The team turned their streak around with two wins, but they were followed by two losses, to give the Storm a 2–5 record in August. September proved to be a better month as the team won three of their four games to finish the season with a 21–11 record.

Their record earned them the fourth seed in the 2021 WNBA Playoffs, which gave them a bye into the Second Round. The Storm hosted the Phoenix Mercury and lost 80–85 in overtime; Stewart did not play in the game.

== Transactions ==
=== WNBA draft ===
Round	Pick	Player	Nationality	School/Team/Country
1	11	Aaliyah Wilson	United States	Texas A&M
2	18	Kiana Williams	United States	Stanford
2	23	N'dea Jones	United States	Texas A&M
3	35	Natalie Kucowski	United States	Lafayette

=== Trades and roster changes ===
Date	Details
February 1, 2021	Re-Signed G Epiphanny Prince
February 8, 2021	F Crystal Langhorne retired
February 8, 2021	Signed F Candice Dupree
February 10, 2021	Acquired the No. 1 pick in the 2021 WNBA draft and two picks in the 2022 WNBA draft from the New York Liberty in exchange for F Natasha Howard via sign-and-trade
February 10, 2021	Acquired F Mikiah Herbert Harrigan from the Minnesota Lynx in exchange for a first-round pick in the 2022 WNBA draft
February 10, 2021	Acquired F Katie Lou Samuelson and a second-round pick in the 2022 WNBA draft from the Dallas Wings in exchange for the No. 1 pick in the 2021 WNBA draft
February 10, 2021	Acquired the rights to F Stephanie Talbot from the New York Liberty in exchange for G Sami Whitcomb via sign-and-trade
February 11, 2021	Signed F Stephanie Talbot
March 1, 2021	Re-Signed G Sue Bird
March 15, 2021	F Morgan Tuck retired
April 15, 2021	Acquired G Kennedy Burke from the Indiana Fever in exchange for the rights to F Aaliyah Wilson
April 17, 2021	Signed G Kiana Williams
May 28, 2021	Set F Mikiah Herbert Harrigan as inactive
June 28, 2021	Waived G Kiana Williams
July 1, 2021	Signed F Cierra Burdick to 7-day contract
July 2, 2021	Waived F Candice Dupree
July 5, 2021	Signed F N'dea Jones to 7-day contract
July 23, 2021	Signed G Kiana Williams to 7-Day Contract
August 18, 2021	Signed F Cierra Burdick to a Rest-Of-Season Contract
August 23, 2021	Signed F Karlie Samuelson to a Rest-Of-Season Contract

== Roster ==
2021 Seattle Storm roster
Players
Coaches

Pos.	No.	Nat.	Name	Height	Weight	DOB	From	Yrs
G	10	(United States)	Bird, Sue	5' 9" (1.75m)	150 lb (68kg)	1980-10-16	Connecticut	17
F	22	(United States)	Burdick, Cierra	6' 2" (1.88m)	172 lb (78kg)	1993-09-30	Tennessee	4
G	8	(United States)	Burke, Kennedy	6' 1" (1.85m)	182 lb (83kg)	1997-02-14	UCLA	2
G	21	(United States)	Canada, Jordin	5' 6" (1.68m)	135 lb (61kg)	1995-08-11	UCLA	3
G	24	(United States)	Loyd, Jewell	5' 10" (1.78m)	148 lb (67kg)	1993-10-05	Notre Dame	6
C	13	(Australia)	Magbegor, Ezi	6' 4" (1.93m)	176 lb (80kg)	1999-08-13	Australia	1
G	11	(Russia)	Prince, Epiphanny	5' 9" (1.75m)	179 lb (81kg)	1988-01-11	Rutgers	11
C	2	(United States)	Russell, Mercedes	6' 6" (1.98m)	195 lb (88kg)	1995-07-27	Tennessee	3
F	44	(United States)	Samuelson, Karlie	6' 0" (1.83m)	160 lb (73kg)	1995-05-10	Stanford	2
F	33	(United States)	Samuelson, Katie Lou	6' 3" (1.91m)	163 lb (74kg)	1997-06-13	Connecticut	2
F	30	(United States)	Stewart, Breanna	6' 4" (1.93m)	170 lb (77kg)	1994-08-27	Connecticut	4
F	7	(Australia)	Talbot, Stephanie	6' 2" (1.88m)	192 lb (87kg)	1994-06-15	Australia	3

Head coach
(United States) / (Bulgaria) Noelle Quinn (UCLA)
Assistant coaches
(United States) Gary Kloppenburg (UC San Diego)
(United States) Ryan Webb (Seattle)
(United States) Perry Huang (Fresno Pacific)
Athletic trainer
Caroline Durocher

Legend

- (C) Team captain
- (DP) Unsigned draft pick
- (FA) Free agent
- (S) Suspended
- Injured

== Game log ==
=== Preseason ===
2021 pre-season game log
May: 2–0 (Home: 1–0; Road: 1–0)

Game	Date	Team	Score	High points	High rebounds	High assists	Location Attendance	Record
1	May 8	@ Phoenix	W 88–71	Ezi Magbegor (17)	Ezi Magbegor (7)	Jordin Canada (6)	Phoenix Suns Arena; 1,985	1–0
2	May 10	Phoenix	W 103–93	K. Williams; Dupree (12)	Stephanie Talbot (5)	Sue Bird (7)	Angel of the Winds Arena	2–0

2021 pre-season schedule

=== Regular season ===
2021 game log
Total: 21–11 (Home: 11–5; Road: 10–6)
May: 5–1 (Home: 3–1; Road: 2–0)

Game	Date	Team	Score	High points	High rebounds	High assists	Location Attendance	Record
1	May 15	Las Vegas	W 97–83	Breanna Stewart (28)	Breanna Stewart (13)	Sue Bird (8)	Angel of the Winds Arena; 1,031	1–0
2	May 18	Las Vegas	L 80–96	Breanna Stewart (26)	Ezi Magbegor (13)	Sue Bird (5)	Angel of the Winds Arena; 1,001	1–1
3	May 20	@ Minnesota	W 90–78	Jewell Loyd (23)	Breanna Stewart (7)	Sue Bird (8)	Target Center; 1,934	2–1
4	May 22	@ Dallas	W 100–97 (OT)	Breanna Stewart (36)	Breanna Stewart (11)	Jewell Loyd (6)	College Park Center; 1,491	3–1
5	May 25	Connecticut	W 87–90 (OT)	Sue Bird (21)	Breanna Stewart (12)	Jewell Loyd (5)	Angel of the Winds Arena; 1,011	4–1
6	May 28	Minnesota	W 82–72	Breanna Stewart (15)	Breanna Stewart (8)	Bird; Loyd; Prince (5)	Angel of the Winds Arena; 1,332	5–1

June : 7–3 (Home: 2–2; Road: 5–1)

Game	Date	Team	Score	High points	High rebounds	High assists	Location Attendance	Record
7	June 1	Indiana	W 88–73	Breanna Stewart (28)	Mercedes Russell (11)	Sue Bird (8)	Angel of the Winds Arena; 1,215	6–1
8	June 4	Dallas	W 105-102 (OT)	Jewell Loyd (25)	Russell; Stewart (9)	Sue Bird (10)	Angel of the Winds Arena; 1,467	7–1
9	June 6	Dallas	L 67–68	Jewell Loyd (25)	Bird; Stewart (7)	Sue Bird (5)	Angel of the Winds Arena; 1,930	7–2
10	June 9	@ Atlanta	W 95–71	Jewell Loyd (18)	Breanna Stewart (9)	Sue Bird (6)	Gateway Center Arena; 1,014	8–2
11	June 11	@ Atlanta	W 86–75	Jewell Loyd (20)	Breanna Stewart (13)	Sue Bird (7)	Gateway Center Arena; 1,405	9–2
12	June 13	@ Connecticut	W 89–66	Breanna Stewart (22)	Breanna Stewart (9)	Breanna Stewart (5)	Mohegan Sun Arena; 2,248	10–2
13	June 15	@ Indiana	W 87–70	Breanna Stewart (20)	Breanna Stewart (12)	Jordin Canada (6)	Indiana Farmers Coliseum; No Fans	11–2
14	June 17	@ Indiana	W 79–69	Breanna Stewart (21)	Breanna Stewart (15)	Sue Bird (7)	Indiana Farmers Coliseum; No Fans	12–2
15	June 22	Washington	L 83–87	Jewell Loyd (23)	Bird; Stewart (8)	Jewell Loyd (9)	Angel of the Winds Arena; 2,495	12–3
16	June 27	@ Las Vegas	L 92–95 (OT)	Breanna Stewart (35)	Russell; Stewart (11)	Sue Bird (6)	Michelob Ultra Arena; 3,766	12–4

July : 4–1 (Home: 3–0; Road: 1–1)

Game	Date	Team	Score	High points	High rebounds	High assists	Location Attendance	Record
17	July 2	Atlanta	W 91–88	Sue Bird (15)	Mercedes Russell (7)	Sue Bird (5)	Angel of the Winds Arena; 3,011	13–4
18	July 4	@ Los Angeles	W 84–74	Breanna Stewart (21)	Ezi Magbegor (9)	Jordin Canada (5)	Los Angeles Convention Center; 716	14–4
19	July 7	Los Angeles	W 71–62	Breanna Stewart (27)	Breanna Stewart (11)	Sue Bird (5)	Angel of the Winds Arena; 2,730	15–4
20	July 9	@ Phoenix	L 77–85	Jewell Loyd (16)	Breanna Stewart (13)	Sue Bird (5)	Phoenix Suns Arena; 7,554	15–5
21	July 11	Phoenix	W 82–75	Epiphanny Prince (15)	Mercedes Russell (10)	Jewell Loyd (6)	Angel of the Winds Arena; 5,110	16–5

August : 2–5 (Home: 0–2; Road: 2–3)

Game	Date	Team	Score	High points	High rebounds	High assists	Location Attendance	Record
CC	August 12	vs. Connecticut	W 79–57	Breanna Stewart (17)	Mercedes Russell (7)	Sue Bird (5)	Footprint Center; 5,006	N/A
22	August 15	@ Chicago	L 85–87	Jewell Loyd (26)	Mercedes Russell (11)	Mercedes Russell (7)	Wintrust Arena; 6,231	16–6
23	August 18	@ New York	L 79–83	Jewell Loyd (35)	Stephanie Talbot (5)	Jordin Canada (6)	Barclays Center; 2,103	16–7
24	August 20	@ New York	W 99–83	Jewell Loyd (29)	Breanna Stewart (14)	Sue Bird (6)	Barclays Center; 3,889	17–7
25	August 22	@ Washington	W 85–78	Breanna Stewart (20)	Breanna Stewart (12)	Bird; Talbot (4)	Entertainment and Sports Arena; 3,114	18–7
26	August 24	@ Minnesota	L 70–76	Breanna Stewart (18)	Breanna Stewart (16)	Sue Bird (7)	Target Center; 3,634	18–8
27	August 27	Chicago	L 69–73	Breanna Stewart (18)	Breanna Stewart (8)	Sue Bird (4)	Angel of the Winds Arena; 3,650	18–9
28	August 29	Chicago	L 75–107	Breanna Stewart (19)	Breanna Stewart (6)	Sue Bird (7)	Angel of the Winds Arena; 3,750	18–10

September : 3–1 (Home: 3–0; Road: 0–1)

Game	Date	Team	Score	High points	High rebounds	High assists	Location Attendance	Record
29	September 2	New York	W 85–75	Breanna Stewart (33)	Breanna Stewart (8)	Breanna Stewart (5)	Angel of the Winds Arena; 3,592	19–10
30	September 7	Washington	W 105–71	Jewell Loyd (20)	Loyd; Magbegor (6)	Sue Bird (7)	Angel of the Winds Arena; 2,390	20–10
31	September 12	@ Los Angeles	L 53–81	Epiphanny Prince (12)	Ezi Magbegor (6)	Jewell Loyd (3)	Staples Center; 4,181	20–11
32	September 17	Phoenix	W 94–85	Jewell Loyd (37)	Mercedes Russell (8)	Sue Bird (7)	Angel of the Winds Arena; 6,000	21–11

2021 season schedule

=== Playoffs ===
2021 playoff game log
Total: 0–1
Second Round

Game	Date	Team	Score	High points	High rebounds	High assists	Location Attendance	Series
1	September 26	Phoenix	80–85 (OT)	Katie Lou Samuelson (18)	Mercedes Russell (12)	Bird; Loyd (5)	Angel of the Winds Arena; 5,375	0–1

2021 playoff schedule

== Standings ==
#	Team	W	L	PCT	GB	Conf.	Home	Road	Cup
1	x – Connecticut Sun	26	6	.813	–	12–3	15–1	11–5	9–1
2	x – Las Vegas Aces	24	8	.750	2	11–4	13–3	11–5	6–4
3	x – Minnesota Lynx	22	10	.688	4	10–5	13–3	9–7	7–3
4	x – Seattle Storm	21	11	.656	5	9–6	11–5	10–6	8–2
5	x – Phoenix Mercury	19	13	.594	7	6–9	7–9	12–4	5–5
6	x – Chicago Sky	16	16	.500	10	10–5	6–10	10–6	6–4
7	x – Dallas Wings	14	18	.438	12	7–8	7–9	7–9	3–7
8	x – New York Liberty	12	20	.375	14	6–9	7–9	5–11	5–5
9	e – Washington Mystics	12	20	.375	14	7–8	8–8	4–12	4–6
10	e – Los Angeles Sparks	12	20	.375	14	2–13	8–8	4–12	1–9
11	e – Atlanta Dream	8	24	.250	18	6–9	4–12	4–12	4–6
12	e – Indiana Fever	6	26	.188	20	4–11	4–12	2–14	2–8

Notes

(#) – League Standing
x – Clinched playoff berth
e – Eliminated from playoff contention
Source: Overall standings and Commissioner's Cup Standings

== Playoffs ==
**First round** single elimination Sept. 23
**5**	**Phoenix Mercury**	**83**
8	New York Liberty	82
**6**	**Chicago Sky**	**81**
7	Dallas Wings	64

**Second round** single elimination Sept. 26
4	Seattle Storm	80
**5**	**Phoenix Mercury**	**85**^{OT}
3	Minnesota Lynx	76
**6**	**Chicago Sky**	**89**

**Semifinals**; Best-of-5; Sept. 28 – Oct. 8
2	Las Vegas Aces	2
**5**	**Phoenix Mercury**	**3**
1	Connecticut Sun	1
**6**	**Chicago Sky**	**3**

**Finals**; Best-of-5; Oct. 10 – 17
5	Phoenix Mercury	1
**6**	**Chicago Sky**	**3**

Note: Teams re-seeded after each round.

- **Bold** – Game or series winner
- Italic – Team with home-court advantage

== Statistics ==
Legend
GP	Games played	GS	Games started	MPG	Minutes per game	RPG	Rebounds per game
APG	Assists per game	SPG	Steals per game	BPG	Blocks per game	PPG	Points per game
FG%	Field-goal percentage	3P%	3-point field-goal percentage	FT%	Free-throw percentage	TO	Turnovers per game
PF	Fouls per game		Team leader		League leader

=== Regular season ===
Player	GP	GS	MPG	FG%	3P%	FT%	RPG	APG	SPG	BPG	PPG
Breanna Stewart	28	28	33.4	43.9	33.3	84.7	9.5	2.7	1.2	1.8	20.3
Jewell Loyd	31	31	31.0	42.0	37.6	88.9	4.0	3.8	1.5	0.2	17.9
Sue Bird	30	30	27.7	43.1	41.9	83.3	2.6	5.3	0.9	0.1	10.0
Mercedes Russell	30	28	24.7	61.7	0.0	76.6	6.1	1.6	0.9	0.4	7.3
Katie Lou Samuelson	27	24	21.0	45.6	35.1	73.1	3.5	1.7	0.7	0.3	7.0
Ezi Magbegor	30	3	15.2	50.9	55.6	84.6	3.8	0.8	0.6	0.9	6.7
Epiphanny Prince	29	2	14.3	43.9	50.0	89.7	1.6	1.7	0.7	0.2	5.8
Jordin Canada	29	3	18.7	38.9	21.4	84.1	2.3	3.0	0.7	0.1	5.8
Stephanie Talbot	30	9	17.9	48.3	41.5	75.0	2.9	1.6	0.5	0.4	5.7
Karlie Samuelson	3	0	10.7	30.0	12.5	100	0.3	0.7	0.0	0.0	3.0
Kennedy Burke	23	0	7.7	44.6	33.3	62.5	0.8	0.3	0.3	0.1	2.9
Cierra Burdick	7	0	5.0	25.0	0.0	50.0	1.7	0.4	0.3	0.3	0.4

== Awards and honors ==
Recipient	Award	Date awarded	Ref.
Breanna Stewart	Western Conference Player of the Week	May 24	
Breanna Stewart	Western Conference Player of the Month - May	June 2	
Jewell Loyd	Western Conference Player of the Week	June 7	
Breanna Stewart	Western Conference Player of the Week	June 14	
Breanna Stewart	Western Conference Player of the Week	June 21	
Sue Bird	WNBA All-Star Selection	June 30	
Jewell Loyd	WNBA All-Star Selection	June 30	
Breanna Stewart	WNBA All-Star Selection	June 30	
Breanna Stewart	WNBA All-Defensive Second Team	September 26	
Jewell Loyd	All-WNBA First Team	October 15	
Breanna Stewart	All-WNBA First Team	October 15	
