= 2021 Phoenix Mercury season =

- Head coach: Sandy Brondello
- Arena: Phoenix Suns Arena

Results
- Record: 19–13 (.594)
- Place: 4th (Western)
- Playoff finish: 5th seed, Lost in WNBA Finals to Chicago Sky 1–3

The 2021 Phoenix Mercury season was the 24th season for the Phoenix Mercury of the Women's National Basketball Association. The season tipped off on May 14, 2021, at the Minnesota Lynx.

The team returned to the newly renovated Phoenix Suns Arena this season. Originally the team had planned to be elsewhere for the 2021 season, but renovations were finished ahead of schedule.

The start to the season was a mixed bag for the Mercury. They went 3–3 during the first month of the season. June was a streaky month for the team as they won the first two games, but then went on a four game losing streak. The streak was broken by two wins, but followed by a loss to finish the month 4–5. The Mercury lost the first game of July, won the middle two, and lost the last game before the Olympic break. They went into the Olympic break with a 9–10 overall record. The Mercury had a spectacular return from the Olympic break, winning all seven of their games in August. Of the seven games only three were against playoff teams, and two of those three were against the eventual eight seed, New York Liberty. The Mercury extended their winning streak into September, and won their first three games of the month. However, their last three games of the season were against the eventual first, second, and fourth seeded playoff teams, and the Mercury lost all three games to finish the month 3–3. They finished with an overall record of 19–13 and secured the fifth overall seed in the playoffs.

As the fifth seed in the playoffs, the Mercury did not receive a bye and played in the First Round. They defeated eight seed New York 83–82 in a close game. As the higher remaining seed in the second round, they traveled to Seattle to face off against the fourth seeded Storm. The Mercury advanced in a thrilling overtime game, 85–80. As the highest seed to advance from the second round, the Mercury played the second seeded Las Vegas Aces in the Semifinals. In a back and forth series the Mercury won games two, three, and five to win the series 3–2 and advance to the Finals. In the Finals, the team faced the Chicago Sky. The Mercury had home court advantage, meaning the first two games were played in Phoenix. The Mercury split those games 1–1 and the series advanced to Chicago. The Sky won both the games at home, and the series 3–1.

== Transactions ==
=== WNBA draft ===
Round	Pick	Player	Nationality	School/Team/Country
3	32	Ciera Johnson	United States	Texas A&M

=== Trades/Roster Changes ===
Date	Details
January 6, 2021	Extended Qualifying Offers to G Marta Xargay, G Shatori Walker-Kimbrough, G Sonja Petrovic, G Shey Peddy, F Nia Coffey, and C Angel Robinson
January 12, 2021	Re-Signed G Shey Peddy to a Training Camp Contract
January 23, 2021	Re-Signed F Nia Coffey to a Training Camp Contract
February 1, 2021	Re-Signed G Diana Taurasi
February 5, 2021	Signed C Kia Vaughn
February 5, 2021	Rescinded Qualifying Offer to G Shatori Walker-Kimbrough
February 10, 2021	Traded the 6th Overall Pick in the 2021 WNBA draft and a 1st Round Pick in the 2022 WNBA Draft to New York in exchange for G Kia Nurse and F Megan Walker
February 10, 2021	Waived F Nia Coffey
February 13, 2021	Traded G Yvonne Turner to Atlanta for a 3rd Round Pick in 2022
March 22, 2021	Signed F Sara Blicavs and G Marta Xargay
April 16, 2021	Signed G Tiana Mangakahia, C Avery Warley-Talbert, and C Akela Maize to Training Camp Contracts
April 16, 2021	Signed F Cierra Burdick to a Training Camp Contract
April 25, 2021	Signed C Ciera Johnson to a Rookie Scale Contract
May 8, 2021	Waived G Marta Xargay, C Akela Maize, and C Avery Warley-Talbert
May 10, 2021	Waived F Cierra Burdick
May 12, 2021	Waived G Tiana Mangakahia, F Sara Blicavs, and C Ciera Johnson
May 13, 2021	Temporarily Suspend C Kia Vaughn due to Overseas Commitments
May 14, 2021	Sign F Cierra Burdick to a Hardship Contract
May 26, 2021	Activate C Kia Vaughn from Temporary Suspension List
May 26, 2021	Release F Cierra Burdick from Hardship Contract
May 27, 2021	Signed G Haley Gorecki to a Hardship Contract
May 27, 2021	Released G Haley Gorecki from the Hardship Contract

== Roster ==
2021 Phoenix Mercury roster
Players
Coaches

Pos.	No.	Nat.	Name	Height	Weight	DOB	From	Yrs
G	9	(United States)	Cunningham, Sophie	6' 1" (1.85m)	170 lb (77kg)	1996-08-16	Missouri	2
G	4	(United States)	Diggins-Smith, Skylar	5' 9" (1.75m)	145 lb (66kg)	1996-08-16	Notre Dame	7
C	42	(United States)	Griner, Brittney	6' 9" (2.06m)	205 lb (93kg)	1990-10-18	Baylor	8
G	14	(France)	Hartley, Bria	5' 8" (1.73m)	148 lb (67kg)	1992-09-30	Connecticut	7
G	0	(Canada)	Nurse, Kia (injured)	6' 0" (1.83m)	168 lb (76kg)	1996-02-22	Connecticut	3
G	5	(United States)	Peddy, Shey	5' 7" (1.7m)	147 lb (67kg)	1988-10-28	Temple	2
F	11	(Australia)	Smith, Alanna	6' 4" (1.93m)	180 lb (82kg)	1996-09-10	Stanford	2
G/F	3	(United States)	Taurasi, Diana	6' 0" (1.83m)	163 lb (74kg)	1982-06-11	Connecticut	16
F	21	(United States)	Turner, Brianna	6' 3" (1.91m)	170 lb (77kg)	1996-07-05	Notre Dame	2
C	1	(Czech Republic)	Vaughn, Kia	6' 4" (1.93m)	205 lb (93kg)	1987-01-24	Rutgers	11
F	2	(United States)	Walker, Megan	6' 1" (1.85m)	175 lb (79kg)	1998-11-23	Connecticut	1

Head coach
(Australia) Sandy Brondello (Western Sydney)
Assistant coaches
(United States) Julie Hairgrove (Arizona)
(United States) Chasity Melvin (NC State)
Athletic trainer
(United States) Hannah Breck (Boston University)
Strength and conditioning coach
(United States) Derrick Nillissen (Iowa Wesleyan)

Legend

- (C) Team captain
- (DP) Unsigned draft pick
- (FA) Free agent
- (S) Suspended
- Injured

== Game log ==
=== Preseason ===
2021 pre-season game log
May: 0–2 (Home: 0–1; Road: 0–1)

Game	Date	Team	Score	High points	High rebounds	High assists	Location Attendance	Record
1	May 8	Seattle	L 71–88	Kia Nurse (12)	Alanna Smith (8)	Nurse; Taurasi (3)	Phoenix Suns Arena; 1,985	0–1
2	May 10	@ Seattle	L 93–103	Kia Nurse (26)	Brittney Griner (6)	Cierra Burdick (6)	Angel of the Winds Arena	0–2

2021 pre-season schedule

=== Regular season ===
2020 game log
Total: 19–13 (Home: 7–9; Road: 12–4)
May: 3–3 (Home: 0–2; Road: 3–1)

Game	Date	Team	Score	High points	High rebounds	High assists	Location Attendance	Record
1	May 14	@ Minnesota	W 77–75	Skylar Diggins-Smith (18)	Brittney Griner (12)	Taurasi; Diggins-Smith (5)	Target Center; 2,021	1–0
2	May 16	@ Connecticut	L 78–86	Diana Taurasi (19)	Brianna Turner (8)	Diana Taurasi (5)	Mohegan Sun Arena; 2,042	1–1
3	May 18	@ Washington	W 91–70	Diana Taurasi (17)	Brianna Turner (14)	Shey Peddy (6)	Entertainment and Sports Arena; 1,050	2–1
4	May 21	Connecticut	L 67–84	Skylar Diggins-Smith (20)	Griner; Turner (5)	Diana Taurasi (4)	Phoenix Suns Arena; 4,101	2–2
5	May 26	Las Vegas	L 79–85	Brittney Griner (27)	Brittney Griner (11)	Skylar Diggins-Smith (11)	Phoenix Suns Arena; 4,082	2–3
6	May 29	@ Dallas	W 89–85	Brittney Griner (27)	Brittney Griner (16)	Skylar Diggins-Smith (7)	College Park Center; 1,717	3–3

June : 4–5 (Home: 2–4; Road: 2–1)

Game	Date	Team	Score	High points	High rebounds	High assists	Location Attendance	Record
7	June 1	@ Chicago	W 84–83	Skylar Diggins-Smith (24)	Nurse; Turner (8)	Shey Peddy (6)	Wintrust Arena; 1,217	4–3
8	June 3	Chicago	W 77–74	Skylar Diggins-Smith (28)	Brittney Griner (12)	Brianna Turner (6)	Phoenix Suns Arena; 3,819	5–3
9	June 9	Dallas	L 81–85	Brittney Griner (27)	Brittney Griner (16)	Skylar Diggins-Smith (5)	Phoenix Suns Arena; 3,618	5–4
10	June 11	Dallas	L 59–77	Brittney Griner (19)	Brittney Griner (6)	Skylar Diggins-Smith (5)	Phoenix Suns Arena; 4,261	5–5
11	June 13	New York	L 83–85	Brittney Griner (29)	Brittney Griner (14)	Skylar Diggins-Smith (5)	Phoenix Suns Arena; 4,476	5–6
12	June 16	@ Los Angeles	L 80–85	Brittney Griner (30)	Brianna Turner (12)	Skylar Diggins-Smith (10)	Los Angeles Convention Center; 514	5–7
13	June 18	@ Los Angeles	W 80–66	Skylar Diggins-Smith (21)	Griner; Turner (8)	Diggins-Smith; Nurse (4)	Los Angeles Convention Center; 520	6–7
14	June 27	Los Angeles	W 88–79	Diana Taurasi (25)	Brianna Turner (15)	Skylar Diggins-Smith (4)	Phoenix Suns Arena; 7,304	7–7
15	June 30	Minnesota	L 76–82	Brittney Griner (28)	Brittney Griner (7)	Diana Taurasi (7)	Phoenix Suns Arena; 4,122	7–8

July : 2–2 (Home: 1–1; Road: 1–1)

Game	Date	Team	Score	High points	High rebounds	High assists	Location Attendance	Record
16	July 3	Minnesota	L 68–99	Skylar Diggins-Smith (12)	Brianna Turner (6)	Kia Vaughn (4)	Phoenix Suns Arena; 8,182	7–9
17	July 7	@ Las Vegas	W 99–90 (OT)	Brittney Griner (33)	Brittney Griner (12)	Skylar Diggins-Smith (8)	Michelob Ultra Arena; 3,013	8–9
18	July 9	Seattle	W 85–77	Brittney Griner (29)	Brittney Griner (15)	Skylar Diggins-Smith (6)	Phoenix Suns Arena; 7,554	9–9
19	July 11	@ Seattle	L 75–82	Kia Nurse (28)	Brittney Griner (9)	Shey Peddy (7)	Angel of the Winds Arena; 5,110	9–10

August : 7–0 (Home: 4–0; Road: 3–0)

Game	Date	Team	Score	High points	High rebounds	High assists	Location Attendance	Record
20	August 15	Atlanta	W 92–81	Skylar Diggins-Smith (19)	Brianna Turner (17)	Skylar Diggins-Smith (7)	Footprint Center; 7,491	10–10
21	August 17	Indiana	W 84–80	Brittney Griner (25)	Brianna Turner (11)	Diana Taurasi (7)	Footprint Center; 4,089	11–10
22	August 19	Washington	W 77–64	Brittney Griner (30)	Brianna Turner (14)	Brittney Griner (5)	Footprint Center; 5,113	12–10
23	August 21	@ Atlanta	W 84–69	Skylar Diggins-Smith (25)	Brittney Griner (12)	Skylar Diggins-Smith (7)	Gateway Center Arena; 2,073	13–10
24	August 25	@ New York	W 106–79	Skylar Diggins-Smith (27)	Brianna Turner (15)	Diana Taurasi (7)	Barclays Center; 1,872	14–10
25	August 27	@ New York	W 80–64	Skylar Diggins-Smith (27)	Kia Vaughn (11)	Skylar Diggins-Smith (7)	Barclays Center; 2,315	15–10
26	August 31	Chicago	W 103–83	Kia Nurse (21)	Skylar Diggins-Smith (8)	Skylar Diggins-Smith (10)	Footprint Center; 5,838	16–10

September : 3–3 (Home: 0–1; Road: 3–2)

Game	Date	Team	Score	High points	High rebounds	High assists	Location Attendance	Record
27	September 4	@ Indiana	W 87–65	Brittney Griner (22)	Brianna Turner (11)	Diana Taurasi (7)	Indiana Farmers Coliseum; N/A	17–10
28	September 6	@ Indiana	W 86–81	Brittney Griner (21)	Brittney Griner (10)	Diana Taurasi (6)	Indiana Farmers Coliseum; N/A	18–10
29	September 8	@ Atlanta	W 76–75	Shey Peddy (18)	Brianna Turner (15)	Skylar Diggins-Smith (5)	Gateway Center Arena; 1,215	19–10
30	September 11	Connecticut	L 67–76	Brittney Griner (25)	Brittney Griner (12)	Skylar Diggins-Smith (5)	Footprint Center; 9,811	19–11
31	September 17	@ Seattle	L 85–94	Brittney Griner (26)	Brittney Griner (13)	Brittney Griner (5)	Angel of the Winds Arena; 6,000	19–12
32	September 19	Las Vegas	L 83–84	Skylar Diggins-Smith (17)	Brianna Turner (8)	Skylar Diggins-Smith (7)	Phoenix Suns Arena; 9,724	19–13

2021 season schedule

=== Playoffs ===
2021 playoff game log
Total: 6–5
First round

Game	Date	Team	Score	High points	High rebounds	High assists	Location Attendance	Series
1	September 23	New York	W 83–82	Skylar Diggins-Smith (22)	Brittney Griner (10)	Brittney Griner (6)	Grand Canyon University Arena; 5,827	1–0

Second round

Game	Date	Team	Score	High points	High rebounds	High assists	Location Attendance	Series
1	September 26	@ Seattle	W 85–80 (OT)	Brittney Griner (23)	Brittney Griner (16)	Skylar Diggins-Smith (6)	Angel of the Winds Arena; 5,375	1–0

Semifinals

Game	Date	Team	Score	High points	High rebounds	High assists	Location Attendance	Series
1	September 28	@ Las Vegas	L 90–96	Brittney Griner (24)	Brianna Turner (8)	Griner; Taurasi (6)	Michelob Ultra Arena; 7,009	0–1
2	September 30	@ Las Vegas	W 117–91	Diana Taurasi (37)	Brianna Turner (8)	Diggins-Smith; Griner; Vaughn (5)	Michelob Ultra Arena; 6,432	1–1
3	October 3	Las Vegas	W 87–60	Brianna Turner (23)	Brianna Turner (17)	Skylar Diggins-Smith (9)	Desert Financial Arena; 7,090	2–1
4	October 6	Las Vegas	L 76–93	Diggins-Smith; Taurasi (14)	Brittney Griner (8)	Taurasi; Turner (4)	Footprint Center; 11,255	2–2
5	October 8	@ Las Vegas	87–84	Brittney Griner (28)	Brianna Turner (11)	Skylar Diggins-Smith (8)	Michelob Ultra Arena; 9,680	3–2

Finals

Game	Date	Team	Score	High points	High rebounds	High assists	Location Attendance	Series
1	October 10	Chicago	L 77–91	Brittney Griner (20)	Brianna Turner (9)	Skylar Diggins-Smith (4)	Footprint Center; 10,191	0–1
2	October 13	Chicago	W 91–86 (OT)	Brittney Griner (29)	Griner; Turner (9)	Skylar Diggins-Smith (12)	Footprint Center; 13,685	1–1
3	October 15	@ Chicago	L 50–86	Brittney Griner (16)	Brianna Turner (7)	Skylar Diggins-Smith (3)	Wintrust Arena; 10,378	1–2
4	October 17	@ Chicago	L 74–80	Brittney Griner (28)	Brianna Turner (12)	Skylar Diggins-Smith (8)	Wintrust Arena; 10,378	1–3

2021 playoff schedule

== Standings ==
#	Team	W	L	PCT	GB	Conf.	Home	Road	Cup
1	x – Connecticut Sun	26	6	.813	–	12–3	15–1	11–5	9–1
2	x – Las Vegas Aces	24	8	.750	2	11–4	13–3	11–5	6–4
3	x – Minnesota Lynx	22	10	.688	4	10–5	13–3	9–7	7–3
4	x – Seattle Storm	21	11	.656	5	9–6	11–5	10–6	8–2
5	x – Phoenix Mercury	19	13	.594	7	6–9	7–9	12–4	5–5
6	x – Chicago Sky	16	16	.500	10	10–5	6–10	10–6	6–4
7	x – Dallas Wings	14	18	.438	12	7–8	7–9	7–9	3–7
8	x – New York Liberty	12	20	.375	14	6–9	7–9	5–11	5–5
9	e – Washington Mystics	12	20	.375	14	7–8	8–8	4–12	4–6
10	e – Los Angeles Sparks	12	20	.375	14	2–13	8–8	4–12	1–9
11	e – Atlanta Dream	8	24	.250	18	6–9	4–12	4–12	4–6
12	e – Indiana Fever	6	26	.188	20	4–11	4–12	2–14	2–8

Notes

(#) – League Standing
x – Clinched playoff berth
e – Eliminated from playoff contention
Source: Overall standings and Commissioner's Cup Standings

== Playoffs ==
**First round** single elimination Sept. 23
**5**	**Phoenix Mercury**	**83**
8	New York Liberty	82
**6**	**Chicago Sky**	**81**
7	Dallas Wings	64

**Second round** single elimination Sept. 26
4	Seattle Storm	80
**5**	**Phoenix Mercury**	**85^{OT}**
3	Minnesota Lynx	76
**6**	**Chicago Sky**	**89**

**Semifinals**; Best-of-5; Sept. 28 – Oct. 8
2	Las Vegas Aces	2
**5**	**Phoenix Mercury**	**3**
1	Connecticut Sun	1
**6**	**Chicago Sky**	**3**

**Finals**; Best-of-5; Oct. 10 – 17
5	Phoenix Mercury	1
**6**	**Chicago Sky**	**3**

Note: Teams re-seeded after each round.

- **Bold** – Game or series winner
- Italic – Team with home-court advantage

== Statistics ==
Legend
GP	Games played	GS	Games started	MPG	Minutes per game	RPG	Rebounds per game
APG	Assists per game	SPG	Steals per game	BPG	Blocks per game	PPG	Points per game
FG%	Field-goal percentage	3P%	3-point field-goal percentage	FT%	Free-throw percentage	TO	Turnovers per game
PF	Fouls per game		Team leader		League leader

=== Regular season ===
Player	GP	GS	MPG	FG%	3P%	FT%	RPG	APG	SPG	BPG	PPG
Brittney Griner	30	30	32.8	57.5	44.4	84.6	9.5	2.7	0.4	1.9	20.5
Skylar Diggins-Smith	32	32	32.5	45.2	37.0	81.8	3.2	5.3	1.1	0.8	17.5
Diana Taurasi	16	16	28.4	36.5	33.9	86.1	4.4	4.9	0.2	0.6	15.2
Kia Nurse	32	32	26.1	35.9	35.3	79.0	3.5	1.8	0.5	0.1	9.5
Brianna Turner	32	32	31.1	55.4	0.0	71.7	9.4	1.8	0.8	1.3	7.8
Sophie Cunningham	30	4	17.5	43.7	41.0	70.4	2.0	1.1	0.5	0.2	5.6
Shey Peddy	32	5	17.5	41.2	33.3	92.0	2.3	2.5	0.9	0.1	5.4
Kia Vaughn	28	2	15.8	44.4	0.0	60.0	2.7	1.3	0.2	0.2	4.6
Megan Walker	29	7	14.7	31.1	62.7	63.3	1.3	0.9	0.2	0.3	4.5
Bria Hartley	6	0	8.5	56.3	57.1	0.0	0.7	0.8	0.2	0.0	3.7
Alanna Smith	18	0	6.5	23.5	19.0	25.0	1.3	0.6	0.4	0.3	1.2

== Awards and Milestones ==
Recipient	Award/Milestone	Date awarded	Ref.
Brittney Griner	Western Conference Player of the Week	June 1	
Diana Taurasi	First WNBA player to reach 9,000 career points	June 27 vs. Los Angeles Sparks	
Skylar Diggins-Smith	WNBA All-Star Selection	June 30	
Brittney Griner	WNBA All-Star Selection	June 30	
Diana Taurasi	WNBA All-Star Selection	June 30	
Brittney Griner	Western Conference Player of the Week	July 12	
Brittney Griner	Western Conference Player of the Week	August 23	
Skylar Diggins-Smith	Western Conference Player of the Week	August 30	
Brittney Griner	Western Conference Player of the Week	September 6	
Brittney Griner	Western Conference Player of the Week	September 13	
Brianna Turner	WNBA All-Defensive First Team	September 26	
Brittney Griner	WNBA All-Defensive Second Team	September 26	
Skylar Diggins-Smith	All-WNBA First Team	October 15	
Brittney Griner	All-WNBA First Team	October 15	
