= 2021 Minnesota Lynx season =

- Head coach: Cheryl Reeve
- Arena: Target Center

Results
- Record: 22–10 (.688)
- Place: 2nd (Western)
- Playoff finish: 3rd seed, Lost in Second Round to Chicago Sky

The 2021 Minnesota Lynx season was the 23rd season for the Minnesota Lynx of the Women's National Basketball Association. The season began on May 14, 2021, versus the Phoenix Mercury.

The 2021 season brought teams back to their home markets instead of playing in a "Bubble" like they did in the 2020 season. The Lynx returned to Target Center and played in front of limited fans. The Lynx also revealed new jerseys on April 8. Three new jerseys - Heroines, Explorers, and Rebels - were used through the season. Each uniform embodies player and team characteristics – attitude, potential, power, and honors not only our fans, but the community as well. The Rebel jersey is inspired by First Avenue.

The Lynx started the season slowly, losing their first four games. However, they won their last game in May, in overtime, over the Connecticut Sun to finish May 1–4. The team's fortunes turned around in June as they posted a 7–3 record. They won their first two games and last three games of the month, and the middle contained a pattern of alternating losses and wins. In July, the Lynx continued their winning streak from the end of June, winning all four games in July. Their seven game winning streak before the Olympic break catapulted them to a 12–7 record at the break. Coming out of the break, the Lynx won their first game before losing two straight games in Connecticut. After those back to back losses, they won five straight games. The streak was ended on September 8 in Las Vegas. However, the team won its last four games, which included three straight wins against Indiana, who finished last in the league. Their 4–2 August record, combined with a 6–1 September mark saw the Lynx finish 22–10 in third place in the standings. The team also had a remarkable 13–3 home record during the season, tied for second best in the league.

As the third seed in the 2021 WNBA Playoffs, the Lynx earned a bye into the second round, and would host the lowest remaining seed from the first round. The Lynx drew Chicago, the 6th seed as their opponent. Chicago finished the season 16–16 but defeated the Lynx 76–89 in the game to end the Lynx' season.

== Transactions ==
=== WNBA draft ===
Round	Pick	Player	Nationality	School/team/country
1	9	Rennia Davis	United States	Tennessee

=== Trades/Roster Changes ===
Date	Details
September 10, 2020	Signed F Damiris Dantas to a multi-year contract extension.
December 4, 2020	Exercised Rookie Contract Options on F Napheesa Collier and Jessica Shepard.
December 18, 2020	Renounced the rights to G Katerina Elhotova.
January 3, 2021	Extended a Qualifying Offer to F Temi Fagbenle, G Anna Cruz, and G Bridget Carleton.
January 8, 2021	Signed G Bridget Carleton to a training-camp contract.
January 13, 2021	Extended a Qualifying Offer to F Erica McCall.
February 1, 2021	Signed G Kayla McBride and F Natalie Achonwa.
February 6, 2021	Signed and Traded F Erica McCall to the Washington Mystics for a 2022 3rd Round Pick.
February 10, 2021	Traded F Mikiah Herbert Harrigan to the Seattle Storm for a 2022 1st Round Pick (via the Phoenix Mercury).
February 13, 2021	Signed G Linnae Harper to a training-camp contract.
February 15, 2021	Signed F Aerial Powers.
February 15, 2021	Traded G Odyssey Sims, the exclusive negotiating rights to F Temi Fagbenle, Minnesota's own 2022 First Round Pick, and Minnesota's own 2022 Third Round Pick to the Indiana Fever for Indiana's own 2022 Second Round Pick.
April 3, 2021	Signed G Mikayla Pivec to a Training Camp contract.
April 16, 2021	Signed F Asheika Alexander to a training-camp contract.
April 17, 2021	Waived G Lexie Brown.
April 17, 2021	Signed G Japreece Dean, G Selena Lott, C Mikayla Vaughn, and F Alex Wittinger to training-camp contracts.
April 19, 2021	Signed F Rennia Davis
April 29, 2021	Waived F Alex Wittinger
May 6, 2021	Waived G Japreece Dean
May 10, 2021	Waived G Asheika Alexander and C Mikayla Vaughn
May 10, 2021	Waived G Linnae Harper
May 13, 2021	Waived G Mikayla Pivec and G Selena Lott
May 13, 2021	Re-Signed G Linnae Harper to Hardship Contract
May 13, 2021	Temporary Suspend F Napheesa Collier due to Overseas Commitments
May 13, 2021	Released G Linnae Harper from Hardship Contract
May 13, 2021	Activated F Napheesa Collier from Temporary Suspension List
May 30, 2021	Sign G Layshia Clarendon to a Hardship Contract
June 11, 2021	Released G Layshia Clarendon from the Hardship Contract
June 12, 2021	Signed G Layshia Clarendon to a Hardship Contract
June 15, 2021	Signed F Cierra Burdick to a Hardship Contract
June 20, 2021	Released G Layshia Clarendon and F Cierra Burdick from their Hardship Contract
June 21, 2021	Re-Sign G Layshia Clarendon to a Hardship Contract
June 28, 2021	Waive G Rachel Banham
June 30, 2021	Release G Layshia Clarendon from the Hardship Contract
July 2, 2021	Sign G Layshia Clarendon
July 5, 2021	Sign G Rachel Banham
July 6, 2021	Sign F Natasha Mack to a 7-day contract
August 14, 2021	Release F Natasha Mack from the 7-day contract
September 10, 2021	Signed F/C Jillian Alleyne to a 7-day contract
September 19, 2021	Signed F/C Jillian Alleyne to a Rest of Season Contract

== Roster ==
2021 Minnesota Lynx roster
Players
Coaches

Pos.	No.	Nat.	Name	Height	Weight	DOB	From	Yrs
F	11	(Canada)	Achonwa, Natalie	6' 3" (1.91m)	195 lb (88kg)	1992-11-22	Notre Dame	6
F/C	14	(United States)	Alleyne, Jillian	6' 2" (1.88m)	193 lb (88kg)	1994-09-08	Oregon	1
G	15	(United States)	Banham, Rachel	5' 9" (1.75m)	172 lb (78kg)	1993-07-15	Minnesota	5
G/F	6	(Canada)	Carleton, Bridget	6' 1" (1.85m)	188 lb (85kg)	1997-05-22	Iowa State	2
G	7	(United States)	Clarendon, Layshia (injured)	5' 9" (1.75m)	153 lb (69kg)	1991-05-02	California	8
F	24	(United States)	Collier, Napheesa	6' 2" (1.88m)	181 lb (82kg)	1996-09-23	Connecticut	2
G	2	(United States)	Dangerfield, Crystal	5' 5" (1.65m)	130 lb (59kg)	1998-05-11	Connecticut	1
F	12	(Brazil)	Dantas, Damiris (injured)	6' 3" (1.91m)	209 lb (95kg)	1992-11-17	Brazil	6
G/F	0	(United States)	Davis, Rennia (injured)	6' 1" (1.85m)	170 lb (77kg)	1999-02-24	Tennessee	R
C	34	(United States)	Fowles, Sylvia	6' 6" (1.98m)	218 lb (99kg)	1985-10-06	LSU	13
G	21	(United States)	McBride, Kayla	5' 10" (1.78m)	174 lb (79kg)	1992-06-25	Notre Dame	7
G/F	3	(United States)	Powers, Aerial	5' 9" (1.75m)	169 lb (77kg)	1994-07-17	Michigan State	5
F	10	(United States)	Shepard, Jessica	6' 3" (1.91m)	175 lb (79kg)	1996-09-11	Notre Dame	1

Head coach
(United States) Cheryl Reeve (La Salle)
Assistant coaches
(United States) Plenette Pierson (Texas Tech)
(United States) Katie Smith (Ohio State)
(United States) Rebekkah Brunson (Georgetown)
Athletic trainer
(United States) Chuck Barta (UW–La Crosse)
Assistant trainer
(United States) Brandi BlueArm (Minnesota State)

Legend

- (C) Team captain
- (DP) Unsigned draft pick
- (FA) Free agent
- (S) Suspended
- Injured

=== Depth ===
Pos.	Starter	Bench
C	Sylvia Fowles	Natalie Achonwa; Jillian Alleyne
PF	Damiris Dantas	Jessica Shepard
SF	Napheesa Collier	Aerial Powers; Bridget Carleton; Rennia Davis
SG	Kayla McBride	Rachel Banham
PG	Layshia Clarendon	Crystal Dangerfield

== Schedule ==
=== Preseason ===
2021 pre-season game log
May: 1–1 (Home: 1–0; Road: 0–1)

Game	Date	Team	Score	High points	High rebounds	High assists	Location Attendance	Record
1	May 1	@ Atlanta	L 61–69	Carleton; Shepard (10)	Shepard; Achonwa; Harper (6)	Japreece Dean (4)	Gateway Center Arena; No Fans	0–1
2	May 8	Washington	W 79–69	Rachel Banham (23)	Jessica Shepard (10)	Natalie Achonwa (5)	Target Center; No Fans	1–1

2021 pre-season schedule

- The preseason game vs. Atlanta was a scrimmage. The second half gave both teams multiple possessions and was not played like a real game.

=== Regular season ===
2021 game log
Total: 22–10 (Home: 13–3; Road: 9–7)
May: 1–4 (Home: 1–2; Road: 0–2)

Game	Date	Team	Score	High points	High rebounds	High assists	Location Attendance	Record
1	May 14	Phoenix	L 75–77	Aerial Powers (18)	Sylvia Fowles (11)	Dantas; Dangerfield (4)	Target Center; 2,021	0–1
2	May 18	@ New York	L 75–86	Sylvia Fowles (26)	Sylvia Fowles (11)	Crystal Dangerfield (6)	Barclays Center; 815	0–2
3	May 20	Seattle	L 78–90	Crystal Dangerfield (22)	Sylvia Fowles (9)	Powers; Dangerfield (6)	Target Center; 1,934	0–3
4	May 28	@ Seattle	L 72–82	Sylvia Fowles (15)	Achowna; Fowles (6)	Napheesa Collier (6)	Angel of the Winds Arena; 1,332	0–4
5	May 30	Connecticut	W 79–74 (OT)	Sylvia Fowles (24)	Sylvia Fowles (9)	Dantas; McBride (5)	Target Center; 2,007	1–4

June : 7–3 (Home: 4–1; Road: 3–2)

Game	Date	Team	Score	High points	High rebounds	High assists	Location Attendance	Record
6	June 4	Atlanta	W 86–84	Napheesa Collier (26)	Sylvia Fowles (11)	Layshia Clarendon (5)	Target Center; 2,024	2–4
7	June 6	Atlanta	W 100–80	Kayla McBride (19)	Sylvia Fowles (7)	Napheesa Collier (6)	Target Center; 2,021	3–4
8	June 8	@ Washington	L 81–85	Napheesa Collier (22)	Napheesa Collier (9)	Clarendon; Dangerfield (6)	Entertainment and Sports Arena; 2,100	3–5
9	June 12	Los Angeles	W 80–64	Crystal Dangerfield (16)	Sylvia Fowles (9)	Clarendon; Collier (4)	Target Center; 2,203	4–5
10	June 15	Chicago	L 89–105	Napheesa Collier (27)	Sylvia Fowles (9)	Clarendon; Dangerfield (5)	Target Center; 2,024	4–6
11	June 17	@ Dallas	W 85–73	Kayla McBride (22)	Sylvia Fowles (12)	Layshia Clarendon (5)	College Park Center; 1,519	5–6
12	June 19	@ Dallas	L 77–95	Collier; Dangerfield (17)	Sylvia Fowles (7)	Layshia Clarendon (6)	College Park Center; 1,751	5–7
13	June 23	@ Atlanta	W 87–85	Sylvia Fowles (26)	Sylvia Fowles (19)	Layshia Clarendon (9)	Gateway Center Arena; 907	6–7
14	June 25	Las Vegas	W 90–89 (OT)	Sylvia Fowles (30)	Sylvia Fowles (14)	Napheesa Collier (8)	Target Center; 2,734	7–7
15	June 30	@ Phoenix	W 82–76	Kayla McBride (26)	Collier; Fowles (11)	Crystal Dangerfield (7)	Phoenix Suns Arena; 4,122	8–7

July : 4–0 (Home: 1–0; Road: 3–0)

Game	Date	Team	Score	High points	High rebounds	High assists	Location Attendance	Record
16	July 3	@ Phoenix	W 99–68	Kayla McBride (24)	Sylvia Fowles (10)	Collier; Shepard (6)	Phoenix Suns Arena; 8,182	9–7
17	July 7	Dallas	W 85–79	Kayla McBride (25)	Sylvia Fowles (11)	Layshia Clarendon (8)	Target Center; 2,321	10–7
18	July 9	@ Las Vegas	W 77–67	Layshia Clarendon (18)	Fowles; Dantas (9)	Layshia Clarendon (9)	Michelob Ultra Arena; N/A	11–7
19	July 11	@ Los Angeles	W 86–61	Napheesa Collier (27)	Damiris Dantas (8)	Layshia Clarendon (8)	Los Angeles Convention Center; 892	12–7

August : 4–2 (Home: 3–0; Road: 1–2)

Game	Date	Team	Score	High points	High rebounds	High assists	Location Attendance	Record
20	August 15	New York	W 88–78	Sylvia Fowles (20)	Sylvia Fowles (11)	Layshia Clarendon (8)	Target Center; 3,534	13–7
21	August 17	@ Connecticut	L 60–72	Sylvia Fowles (14)	Sylvia Fowles (5)	Achonwa; Clarendon (3)	Mohegan Sun Arena; 3,488	13–8
22	August 19	@ Connecticut	L 71–82	Sylvia Fowles (18)	Sylvia Fowles (11)	Layshia Clarendon (8)	Mohegan Sun Arena; 3,536	13–9
23	August 21	@ Chicago	W 101–95	Layshia Clarendon (18)	Dantas; McBride (7)	Layshia Clarendon (5)	Wintrust Arena; 5,036	14–9
24	August 24	Seattle	W 76–70	Sylvia Fowles (29)	Sylvia Fowles (20)	Layshia Clarendon (6)	Target Center; 3,634	15–9
25	August 31	New York	W 74–66	Kayla McBride (25)	Napheesa Collier (14)	Rachel Banham (5)	Target Center; 3,221	16–9

September : 6–1 (Home: 4–0; Road: 2–1)

Game	Date	Team	Score	High points	High rebounds	High assists	Location Attendance	Record
26	September 2	Los Angeles	W 66–57	Kayla McBride (17)	Sylvia Fowles (17)	Carleton; Collier (4)	Target Center; 3,121	17–9
27	September 4	Washington	W 93–75	Napheesa Collier (21)	Napheesa Collier (9)	Rachel Banham (8)	Target Center; 3,403	18–9
28	September 8	@ Las Vegas	L 81–102	Aerial Powers (20)	Sylvia Fowles (11)	Collier; McBride (4)	Michelob Ultra Arena; 5,663	18–10
29	September 10	Indiana	W 89–72	Aerial Powers (20)	Fowles; Shepard (7)	Banham; Dangerfield (5)	Target Center; 3,503	19–10
30	September 12	Indiana	W 90–80	Napheesa Collier (22)	Sylvia Fowles (8)	Napheesa Collier (7)	Target Center; 3,434	20–10
31	September 17	@ Indiana	W 92–73	Sylvia Fowles (21)	Sylvia Fowles (10)	Bridget Carleton (5)	Indiana Farmers Coliseum; N/A	21–10
32	September 19	@ Washington	W 83–77	Aerial Powers (27)	Sylvia Fowles (13)	Layshia Clarendon (6)	Entertainment and Sports Arena; 2,854	22–10

2021 season schedule

=== Playoffs ===
2021 playoff game log
Total: 0–1
Second round

Game	Date	Team	Score	High points	High rebounds	High assists	Location Attendance	Series
1	September 26	Chicago	76–89	Aerial Powers (24)	Sylvia Fowles (8)	Aerial Powers (4)	Target Center; 4,334	0–1

2021 playoff schedule

== Standings ==
#	Team	W	L	PCT	GB	Conf.	Home	Road	Cup
1	x – Connecticut Sun	26	6	.813	–	12–3	15–1	11–5	9–1
2	x – Las Vegas Aces	24	8	.750	2	11–4	13–3	11–5	6–4
3	x – Minnesota Lynx	22	10	.688	4	10–5	13–3	9–7	7–3
4	x – Seattle Storm	21	11	.656	5	9–6	11–5	10–6	8–2
5	x – Phoenix Mercury	19	13	.594	7	6–9	7–9	12–4	5–5
6	x – Chicago Sky	16	16	.500	10	10–5	6–10	10–6	6–4
7	x – Dallas Wings	14	18	.438	12	7–8	7–9	7–9	3–7
8	x – New York Liberty	12	20	.375	14	6–9	7–9	5–11	5–5
9	e – Washington Mystics	12	20	.375	14	7–8	8–8	4–12	4–6
10	e – Los Angeles Sparks	12	20	.375	14	2–13	8–8	4–12	1–9
11	e – Atlanta Dream	8	24	.250	18	6–9	4–12	4–12	4–6
12	e – Indiana Fever	6	26	.188	20	4–11	4–12	2–14	2–8

== Playoffs ==
**First round** single elimination Sept. 23
**5**	**Phoenix Mercury**	**83**
8	New York Liberty	82
**6**	**Chicago Sky**	**81**
7	Dallas Wings	64

**Second round** single elimination Sept. 26
4	Seattle Storm	80
**5**	**Phoenix Mercury**	**85**^{OT}
3	Minnesota Lynx	76
**6**	**Chicago Sky**	**89**

**Semifinals**; Best-of-5; Sept. 28 – Oct. 8
2	Las Vegas Aces	2
**5**	**Phoenix Mercury**	**3**
1	Connecticut Sun	1
**6**	**Chicago Sky**	**3**

**Finals**; Best-of-5; Oct. 10 – 17
5	Phoenix Mercury	1
**6**	**Chicago Sky**	**3**

Note: Teams re-seeded after each round.

- **Bold** – Game or series winner
- Italic – Team with home-court advantage

== Statistics ==
Legend
GP	Games played	GS	Games started	MPG	Minutes per game	RPG	Rebounds per game
APG	Assists per game	SPG	Steals per game	BPG	Blocks per game	PPG	Points per game
FG%	Field-goal percentage	3P%	3-point field-goal percentage	FT%	Free-throw percentage	TO	Turnovers per game
PF	Fouls per game		Team leader		League leader

=== Regular season ===
Player	GP	GS	MPG	FG%	3P%	FT%	RPG	APG	SPG	BPG	PPG
Napheesa Collier	29	29	34.6	44.1	25.3	86.0	6.6	3.2	1.3	1.3	16.2
Sylvia Fowles	31	31	30.1	64.0	0.0	75.5	10.1	1.4	1.8	1.8	16.0
Kayla McBride	32	32	31.6	43.3	37.9	91.0	3.6	2.3	0.8	0.2	13.7
Aerial Powers	14	7	22.1	42.7	31.4	91.7	3.6	2.1	0.4	0.4	13.4
Layshia Clarendon	21	20	25.7	51.7	35.7	78.4	3.1	5.7	0.6	0.0	10.4
Damiris Dantas	24	20	23.8	37.7	33.3	75.0	4.0	2.3	0.4	0.3	7.7
Crystal Dangerfield	31	10	20.1	38.8	35.9	85.7	2.0	2.8	0.7	0.1	7.7
Rachel Banham	27	0	12.6	39.5	37.3	62.5	1.2	1.6	0.3	0.1	5.0
Bridget Carleton	32	10	19.3	40.1	36.5	80.0	2.3	1.5	0.8	0.2	4.8
Natalie Achonwa	21	1	12.0	42.6	0.0	89.3	2.1	1.2	0.6	0.2	3.7
Jessica Shepard	22	0	10.5	36.4	8.3	75.0	3.2	1.7	0.1	0.2	2.0
Jillian Alleyne	0	0	0.0	0.0	0.0	0.0	0.0	0.0	0.0	0.0	0.0
Rennia Davis	0	0	0.0	0.0	0.0	0.0	0.0	0.0	0.0	0.0	0.0

== Awards and Milestones ==
Recipient	Award/Milestone	Date Awarded	Reference
Kayla McBride	3,000th Career Point	June 17 (vs. Dallas)	
Napheesa Collier	1,000th Career Point	June 30 (vs. Phoenix)	
Sylvia Fowles	Western Conference Player of the Week	June 28	
Napheesa Collier	WNBA All-Star Selection	June 30	
Sylvia Fowles	WNBA All-Star Selection	June 30	
Sylvia Fowles	Western Conference Player of the Month	September 2	
Sylvia Fowles	WNBA All-Defensive First Team	September 26	
Sylvia Fowles	WNBA Defensive Player of the Year	September 26	
Sylvia Fowles	All-WNBA Second Team	October 15	
