= 2021 Atlanta Dream season =

- Head coach: Darius Taylor (Interim) (since July 24); Mike Petersen (Interim) (before July 24)
- Arena: Gateway Center Arena

Results
- Record: 8–24 (.250)
- Place: 5th (Eastern)
- Playoff finish: Did not qualify

The 2021 WNBA season was the 14th season for the Atlanta Dream of the Women's National Basketball Association. The team began the season on May 14, 2021 at home against the Connecticut Sun.

This was the first season that the Dream will play home games at the Gateway Center Arena at College Park. In the 2019 offseason the team elected to move from State Farm Arena. However, due to the COVID-19 pandemic, the 2020 season was played at a neutral site.

Mike Petersen began the season as interim head coach, but stepped down on July 24 for health reasons. Darius Taylor took over as interim coach through the end of the regular season.

The Dream began the season by losing their first two games, but then going on a four game winning streak. That win streak was followed by a four game losing streak. After winning their next game, the Dream were 5–6 through their first eleven games. However, the Dream could only win one more of their next eight games to go into the Olympic break with a record of 6–13. The team's struggles continued after the break as they lost seven straight games. They did manage to win two of their last five games to finish with an 8–24 record.

== Transactions ==
=== WNBA draft ===
Round	Pick	Player	Nationality	School/team/country
1	3	Aari McDonald	United States	Arizona
2	15	Raquel Carrera	Spain	Valencia Basket (Spain)
3	27	Lindsey Pulliam	United States	Northwestern

=== Trades and Roster Changes ===
Date	Details
December 9, 2020	Exercised Team Options on Kalani Brown and Maite Cazorla
January 2, 2021	Extended a Qualifying Offer to Kaela Davis, Jaylyn Agnew, and Blake Dietrick
February 1, 2021	Signed Cheyenne Parker
February 4, 2021	Signed Tianna Hawkins
February 5, 2021	Renounced the rights to Kobi Thornton
February 9, 2021	Renee Montgomery announced her Retirement
February 13, 2021	Traded a 3rd round pick in the 2022 WNBA draft to the Phoenix Mercury in exchange for Yvonne Turner
February 21, 2021	Signed Kaela Davis to a training-camp contract
February 21, 2021	Waived Mikayla Pivec and Brittany Brewer
February 22, 2021	Signed Shatori Walker-Kimbrough
March 1, 2021	Signed Odyssey Sims
April 17, 2021	Signed Crystal Bradford and Mikayla Cowling to training camp contracts
April 18, 2021	Signed Aari McDonald and Lindsey Pulliam
May 3, 2021	Mike Petersen promoted to interim head coach after Nicki Collen leaves for Baylor
May 5, 2021	Waived Yvonne Turner.
May 9, 2021	Waived Kaela Davis and Lindsey Pulliam
May 13, 2021	Waived Shatori Walker-Kimbrough and Mikayla Cowling
May 26, 2021	Waived Kalani Brown
July 6, 2021	Temporarily Suspend Chennedy Carter
July 26, 2021	Signed Candice Dupree.
August 14, 2021	Cheyenne Parker moved to the Inactive List due to Pregnancy
August 24, 2021	Signed Blake Dietrick.

== Roster ==
2021 Atlanta Dream roster
Players
Coaches

Pos.	No.	Nat.	Name	Height	Weight	DOB	From	Yrs
F	25	(United States)	Billings, Monique	6' 4" (1.93m)	192 lb (87kg)	1996-05-02	UCLA	3
G	9	(United States)	Bradford, Crystal	6' 0" (1.83m)	170 lb (77kg)	1993-11-01	Central Michigan	1
G	3	(United States)	Carter, Chennedy (S)	5' 9" (1.75m)	143 lb (65kg)	1998-11-14	Texas A&M	1
G	11	(United States)	Dietrick, Blake	5' 10" (1.78m)	169 lb (77kg)	1993-07-19	Princeton	4
F	24	(United States)	Dupree, Candice	6' 2" (1.88m)	178 lb (81kg)	1984-08-16	Temple	15
F	21	(United States)	Hawkins, Tianna	6' 3" (1.91m)	186 lb (84kg)	1991-03-02	Maryland	7
G	15	(United States)	Hayes, Tiffany	5' 10" (1.78m)	155 lb (70kg)	1989-09-29	Connecticut	8
G	4	(United States)	McDonald, Aari	5' 6" (1.68m)	141 lb (64kg)	1998-08-20	Arizona	R
C	32	(United States)	Parker, Cheyenne	6' 4" (1.93m)	193 lb (88kg)	1993-08-22	Middle Tennessee	6
G	0	(United States)	Sims, Odyssey	5' 8" (1.73m)	163 lb (74kg)	1992-07-13	Baylor	7
F	40	(United States)	Stricklen, Shekinna	6' 2" (1.88m)	230 lb (104kg)	1990-07-30	Tennessee	8
G	10	(United States)	Williams, Courtney	5' 8" (1.73m)	133 lb (60kg)	1994-05-11	South Florida	5
C	1	(United States)	Williams, Elizabeth	6' 3" (1.91m)	200 lb (91kg)	1993-06-23	Duke	6

Head coach
(United States) Darius Taylor (Michigan)
Assistant coaches
(United States) La'Keshia Frett (Georgia)
(United States) Daynia La-Force (Georgetown)
Athletic trainer
(United States) Natalie Trotter
Strength and conditioning coach
(United States) Drew Williams

Legend

- (C) Team captain
- (DP) Unsigned draft pick
- (FA) Free agent
- (S) Suspended
- Injured

=== Depth ===
Pos.	Starter	Bench
C	Elizabeth Williams	Cheyenne Parker
PF	Monique Billings	Candice Dupree; Tianna Hawkins
SF	Tiffany Hayes	Crystal Bradford; Shekinna Stricklen
SG	Courtney Williams	Blake Dietrick
PG	Odyssey Sims	Aari McDonald; Chennedy Carter

== Schedule ==
=== Preseason ===
2021 pre-season game log
May: 2–0 (Home: 1–0; Road: 1–0)

Game	Date	Team	Score	High points	High rebounds	High assists	Location Attendance	Record
1	May 1	Minnesota	W 69–61	Parker; Sims (12)	Monique Billings (7)	Courtney Williams (5)	Gateway Center Arena; 0	1–0
2	May 5	@ Washington	W 87–80	Billings; Sims (13)	Monique Billings (7)	Williams; McDonald; Bradford (2)	Entertainment and Sports Arena; 0	2–0

2021 pre-season schedule

- The preseason game vs. Minnesota was a scrimmage. The second half gave both teams multiple possessions and was not played like a real game.

=== Regular season ===
2021 game log
Total: 8–24 (Home: 4–12; Road: 4–12)
May: 4–2 (Home: 1–2; Road: 3–0)

Game	Date	Team	Score	High points	High rebounds	High assists	Location Attendance	Record
1	May 14	Connecticut	L 67–78	Sims; C. Williams (14)	Billings; Bradford (5)	Courtney Williams (4)	Gateway Center Arena; 561	0–1
2	May 19	Chicago	L 77–85	Courtney Williams (24)	Billings; C. Williams (8)	Chennedy Carter (6)	Gateway Center Arena; 689	0–2
3	May 21	@ Indiana	W 83–79	Chennedy Carter (23)	Monique Billings (7)	Carter; C. Williams (4)	Bankers Life Fieldhouse	1–2
4	May 25	@ Chicago	W 90–83	Tiffany Hayes (26)	Monique Billings (7)	Aari McDonald (5)	Wintrust Arena; 1,004	2–2
5	May 27	Dallas	W 101–95	Tiffany Hayes (26)	Monique Billings (11)	Courtney Williams (5)	Gateway Center Arena; 711	3–2
6	May 29	@ New York	W 90–87	Courtney Williams (31)	Courtney Williams (12)	Courtney Williams (7)	Barclays Center; 1,235	4–2

June : 2–7 (Home: 2–4; Road: 0–3)

Game	Date	Team	Score	High points	High rebounds	High assists	Location Attendance	Record
7	June 4	@ Minnesota	L 84-86	Tiffany Hayes (23)	Courtney Williams (10)	Odyssey Sims (6)	Target Center; 2,024	4–3
8	June 6	@ Minnesota	L 80–100	Tiffany Hayes (21)	Monique Billings (6)	Courtney Williams (5)	Target Center; 2,021	4–4
9	June 9	Seattle	L 71–95	Tiffany Hayes (22)	Elizabeth Williams (12)	Courtney Williams (6)	Gateway Center Arena; 1,014	4–5
10	June 11	Seattle	L 75–86	Courtney Williams (19)	Courtney Williams (11)	Hayes; Sims (4)	Gateway Center Arena; 1,405	4–6
11	June 13	Washington	W 101–78	Courtney Williams (21)	Elizabeth Williams (7)	Tiffany Hayes (6)	Gateway Center Arena; 1,122	5–6
12	June 17	@ Washington	L 93–96	Odyssey Sims (22)	Tianna Hawkins (9)	Odyssey Sims (7)	Entertainment and Sports Arena; 2,100	5–7
13	June 23	Minnesota	L 85–87	Courtney Williams (24)	Parker; E. Williams (7)	Cheyenne Parker (5)	Gateway Center Arena; 907	5–8
14	June 26	New York	L 78–101	Chennedy Carter (24)	Monique Billings (9)	Sims; C. Williams (4)	Gateway Center Arena; 1,605	5–9
15	June 29	New York	W 73–69	Courtney Williams (18)	Billings; Bradford (7)	Carter; C. Williams (4)	Gateway Center Arena; 1,131	6–9

July : 0–4 (Home: 0–1; Road: 0–3)

Game	Date	Team	Score	High points	High rebounds	High assists	Location Attendance	Record
16	July 2	@ Seattle	L 88–91	Courtney Williams (20)	Billings; C. Williams (8)	Bradford; C. Williams (7)	Angel of the Winds Arena; 3,011	6–10
17	July 4	@ Las Vegas	L 95–118	Courtney Williams (19)	Cheyenne Parker (7)	Odyssey Sims (13)	Michelob Ultra Arena; 2,705	6–11
18	July 9	@ Connecticut	L 72–84	Cheyenne Parker (15)	Parker; Sims (6)	McDonald; Sims; C. Williams (3)	Mohegan Sun Arena; 2,286	6–12
19	July 11	Indiana	L 68–79	Odyssey Sims (20)	Elizabeth Williams (7)	Courtney Williams (5)	Gateway Center Arena; 1,897	6–13

August : 0–6 (Home: 0–3; Road: 0–3)

Game	Date	Team	Score	High points	High rebounds	High assists	Location Attendance	Record
20	August 15	@ Phoenix	L 81–92	Courtney Williams (30)	Monique Billings (8)	Courtney Williams (6)	Phoenix Suns Arena; 7,491	6–14
21	August 17	@ Los Angeles	L 80–85 (OT)	Odyssey Sims (26)	Courtney Williams (9)	Odyssey Sims (6)	Staples Center; 2,200	6–15
22	August 19	@ Los Angeles	L 64–66	Courtney Williams (23)	Courtney Williams (11)	Courtney Williams (4)	Staples Center; 1,885	6–16
23	August 21	Phoenix	L 69–84	Odyssey Sims (16)	Courtney Williams (7)	Courtney Williams (4)	Gateway Center Arena; 2,073	6–17
24	August 24	Chicago	L 79–86	Odyssey Sims (17)	Monique Billings (8)	Odyssey Sims (5)	Gateway Center Arena; 1,292	6–18
25	August 26	Las Vegas	L 71–78	Monique Billings (21)	Hayes; C. Williams (8)	Courtney Williams (5)	Gateway Center Arena; 2,182	6–19

September : 2–5 (Home: 1–2; Road: 1–3)

Game	Date	Team	Score	High points	High rebounds	High assists	Location Attendance	Record
26	September 2	@ Dallas	L 68–72	Courtney Williams (25)	Monique Billings (11)	Courtney Williams (7)	College Park Center; 1,975	6–20
27	September 5	@ Dallas	W 69–64	Tiffany Hayes (22)	Monique Billings (14)	Monique Billings (4)	College Park Center; 2,386	7–20
28	September 8	Phoenix	L 75–76	Courtney Williams (20)	Courtney Williams (14)	Courtney Williams (5)	Gateway Center Arena; 1,215	7–21
29	September 10	@ Washington	L 74–82	Courtney Williams (23)	Monique Billings (10)	Tiffany Hayes (6)	Entertainment and Sports Arena; 2,320	7–22
30	September 14	Indiana	W 85–78	Tiffany Hayes (31)	Courtney Williams (11)	Aari McDonald (6)	Gateway Center Arena; 1,208	8–22
31	September 16	Los Angeles	L 68–74	Tiffany Hayes (25)	Courtney Williams (10)	Hayes; Sims (3)	Gateway Center Arena; 2,537	8–23
32	September 19	@ Connecticut	L 64–84	Courtney Williams (18)	Billings; C. Williams (6)	Aari McDonald (4)	Mohegan Sun Arena; 4,724	8–24

2021 season schedule

== Standings ==
#	Team	W	L	PCT	GB	Conf.	Home	Road	Cup
1	x – Connecticut Sun	26	6	.813	–	12–3	15–1	11–5	9–1
2	x – Las Vegas Aces	24	8	.750	2	11–4	13–3	11–5	6–4
3	x – Minnesota Lynx	22	10	.688	4	10–5	13–3	9–7	7–3
4	x – Seattle Storm	21	11	.656	5	9–6	11–5	10–6	8–2
5	x – Phoenix Mercury	19	13	.594	7	6–9	7–9	12–4	5–5
6	x – Chicago Sky	16	16	.500	10	10–5	6–10	10–6	6–4
7	x – Dallas Wings	14	18	.438	12	7–8	7–9	7–9	3–7
8	x – New York Liberty	12	20	.375	14	6–9	7–9	5–11	5–5
9	e – Washington Mystics	12	20	.375	14	7–8	8–8	4–12	4–6
10	e – Los Angeles Sparks	12	20	.375	14	2–13	8–8	4–12	1–9
11	e – Atlanta Dream	8	24	.250	18	6–9	4–12	4–12	4–6
12	e – Indiana Fever	6	26	.188	20	4–11	4–12	2–14	2–8

Notes

(#) – League Standing
x – Clinched playoff berth
e – Eliminated from playoff contention
Source: Overall standings and Commissioner's Cup Standings

== Statistics ==
Legend
GP	Games played	GS	Games started	MPG	Minutes per game	RPG	Rebounds per game
APG	Assists per game	SPG	Steals per game	BPG	Blocks per game	PPG	Points per game
FG%	Field-goal percentage	3P%	3-point field-goal percentage	FT%	Free-throw percentage	TO	Turnovers per game
PF	Fouls per game		Team leader		League leader

=== Regular season ===
Player	GP	GS	MPG	FG%	3P%	FT%	RPG	APG	SPG	BPG	PPG
Courtney Williams	32	32	34.4	41.8	38.2	64.2	6.8	4.0	1.1	0.5	16.5
Tiffany Hayes	21	19	28.3	43.8	40.5	85.3	3.2	3.0	1.6	0.2	14.7
Chennedy Carter	11	11	25.5	45.5	11.1	87.5	1.3	3.3	0.7	0.4	14.2
Crystal Bradford	24	9	18.3	42.9	35.8	46.2	3.8	1.5	1.2	0.4	8.8
Odyssey Sims	30	21	25.1	37.0	23.2	72.9	2.5	3.6	1.2	0.1	8.7
Monique Billings	31	9	23.8	49.5	0.0	67.5	6.5	1.0	1.2	1.0	8.1
Candice Dupree	10	4	20.3	43.4	0.0	63.6	3.8	0.6	0.5	0.2	7.3
Aari McDonald	30	4	16.4	32.2	30.8	88.2	1.6	2.0	0.8	0.2	6.3
Elizabeth Williams	32	32	23.8	51.6	0.0	50.9	4.9	1.2	1.1	1.3	5.8
Tianna Hawkins	28	8	15.5	39.7	24.2	91.3	3.1	0.6	0.4	0.5	4.9
Shekinna Stricklen	24	0	9.8	25.9	21.2	40.0	0.9	0.3	0.4	0.2	2.5
Blake Dietrick	9	0	15.7	29.6	31.3	0.0	1.6	1.2	0.6	0.1	2.3

== Awards and honors ==
Recipient	Award	Date awarded	Ref.
Courtney Williams	WNBA All-Star Selection	June 30	
Aari McDonald	WNBA All-Rookie Team	October 5	
