= 2021 Dallas Wings season =

- Head coach: Vickie Johnson
- Arena: College Park Center

Results
- Record: 14–18 (.438)
- Place: 5th (Western)
- Playoff finish: 7th seed, Lost in First Round to Chicago Sky

The 2021 Dallas Wings season was the franchise's 24th season in the Women's National Basketball Association (WNBA) and the 6th season for the franchise in Dallas. This was the first season under new head coach Vickie Johnson, after she was hired on December 9, 2020.

The Wings had the #1 and #2 picks in the 2021 WNBA draft. They selected Charli Collier and Awak Kuier, while also adding top talents in Chelsea Dungee and Dana Evans.

The Wings won their first game of the season, but couldn't keep the momentum going as they lost their next four games in a row, to finish May with a 1–4 record. The team improved during the month of June, posting a 7–5 overall record including wins at Seattle and a two-game sweep of Phoenix. The team faltered in July going 1–3 including three straight losses heading into the Olympic break. At the Olympic break their record was 9–12. After the break, they alternated loss and wins to post a 2–3 record in August. They finished out the regular season 3–3 in September, and secured a playoff berth after a win on September 11 vs. the New York Liberty. Their overall record of 14–18 earned the seventh seed in the 2021 WNBA Playoffs.

In the first round of the playoffs, they faced off against the Chicago Sky. The Sky dominated the game from the outset and the Wings outscored the Sky in only one quarter of the game. The Wings lost 64–81 to end their season.

== Transactions ==
=== WNBA draft ===
Round	Pick	Player	School/Team/Country	Nationality
1	1	Charli Collier	Texas	United States
1	2	Awak Kuier	Passalacqua Ragusa (Italy)	Finland
1	5	Chelsea Dungee	Arkansas	United States
2	13	Dana Evans	Louisville	United States

=== Trades and Roster changes ===
Date	Details
November 5, 2020	Exercised Team Option on G Arike Ogunbowale
November 10, 2020	Exercised Team Options on G Marina Mabrey and F Katie Lou Samuelson
February 1, 2021	Signed G Allisha Gray
February 8, 2021	Signed Kayla Thornton to a Contract Extension
February 10, 2021	Traded Katie Lou Samuelson and a 2nd Round Pick in 2022 to the Seattle Storm in exchange for the 1st Pick in the 2021 WNBA draft
February 25, 2021	Waived F Astou Ndour
March 12, 2021	Signed F Luisa Geiselsöder to a Rookie Scale Contract
March 31, 2021	Full Season Suspended F Luisa Geiselsöder due to Overseas Injury
April 14, 2021	Traded the 7th Pick in the 2021 Draft and a 2nd Round Pick in the 2022 Draft to the Los Angeles Sparks for a 1st Round Pick in the 2022 Draft
April 16, 2021	Signed G Dana Evans and G Chelsea Dungee to Rookie Scale Contracts
April 18, 2021	Signed F Awak Kuier to a Rookie Scale Contract
April 18, 2021	Signed G Dee Givens, G Destinee Walker, and F Tori Jarosz to Training Camp Contracts
April 19, 2021	Signed F Amy Okonkwo to a Training Camp Contract
April 30, 2021	Waived F Amy Okonkwo and F Tori Jarosz
May 9, 2021	Waived G Dee Givens
May 10, 2021	Waived G Destinee Walker
May 10, 2021	Temporarily Suspend F Satou Sabally due to Overseas Commitments
May 12, 2021	Waived F Megan Gustafson
May 14, 2021	Temporarily Suspend F Awak Kuier due to Overseas Commitments
May 15, 2021	Signed F Kristine Anigwe off of Waivers
May 18, 2021	Temporarily Suspend G Allisha Gray due to Overseas Commitments
May 27, 2021	Activated F Awak Kuier from the Temporary Suspension List
June 2, 2021	Traded G Dana Evans to Chicago in exchange for Chicago's own 2022 3rd Round Draft pick, the right to swap 2022 1st Round draft picks, and G Shyla Heal.
June 2, 2021	Waived G Shyla Heal
June 2, 2021	Activated G Allisha Gray and F Satou Sabally from the Temporary Suspension List
June 2, 2021	Waived F Kristine Anigwe

== Roster ==
2021 Dallas Wings roster
Players
Coaches

Pos.	No.	Nat.	Name	Height	Weight	DOB	From	Yrs
F/C	32	(United States)	Alarie, Bella	6' 4" (1.93m)	190 lb (86kg)	1998-04-23	Princeton	1
G	33	(United States)	Dungee, Chelsea	5' 10" (1.78m)	165 lb (75kg)	1997-05-11	Arkansas	R
G	15	(United States)	Gray, Allisha	6' 0" (1.83m)	167 lb (76kg)	1995-01-12	South Carolina	4
G	52	(United States)	Harris, Tyasha	5' 10" (1.78m)	152 lb (69kg)	1998-05-01	South Carolina	1
F	20	(United States)	Harrison, Isabelle	6' 3" (1.91m)	183 lb (83kg)	1993-09-27	Tennessee	4
G	4	(United States)	Jefferson, Moriah	5' 6" (1.68m)	123 lb (56kg)	1994-03-08	Connecticut	4
F/C	28	(Finland)	Kuier, Awak	6' 4" (1.93m)	168 lb (76kg)	2001-08-19	Finland	R
G	3	(United States)	Mabrey, Marina	5' 11" (1.8m)	170 lb (77kg)	1996-09-14	Notre Dame	2
G	24	(United States)	Ogunbowale, Arike	5' 8" (1.73m)	165 lb (75kg)	1997-03-02	Notre Dame	2
F	0	(Germany)	Sabally, Satou	6' 4" (1.93m)		1998-04-25	Oregon	1
C	35	(United States)	Collier, Charli	6' 5" (1.96m)	188 lb (85kg)	1999-09-22	Texas	R
F	6	(United States)	Thornton, Kayla	6' 1" (1.85m)	188 lb (85kg)	1992-10-20	UTEP	5

Head coach
(United States) Vickie Johnson (Louisiana Tech)
Assistant coaches
(United States) Le'coe Willingham (Auburn)
(United States) Kelly Schumacher (Connecticut)
(United States) Tim Gittens (Milwaukee)
Athletic trainer
(United States) Branay Hicks (UT Tyler)

Legend

- (C) Team captain
- (DP) Unsigned draft pick
- (FA) Free agent
- (S) Suspended
- Injured

== Game log ==
=== Preseason ===
2021 pre-season game log
May: 0–1 (Home: 0–1; Road: 0–0)

Game	Date	Team	Score	High points	High rebounds	High assists	Location Attendance	Record
1	May 8	Connecticut	L 76–89	Allisha Gray (19)	Charli Collier (10)	Moriah Jefferson (4)	College Park Center	0–1
2	May 11	@ New York	Scrimmage				Barclays Center	0–0

2021 pre-season schedule

=== Regular season ===
2021 game log
Total: 14–18 (Home: 7–9; Road: 7–9)
May: 1–4 (Home: 0–2; Road: 1–2)

Game	Date	Team	Score	High points	High rebounds	High assists	Location Attendance	Record
1	May 14	@ Los Angeles	W 94–71	Allisha Gray (23)	Kayla Thornton (11)	Tyasha Harris (7)	Los Angeles Convention Center; No Fans	1–0
2	May 22	Seattle	97–100 (OT)	Arike Ogunbowale (28)	Kayla Thornton (12)	Arike Ogunbowale (6)	College Park Center; 1,491	1–1
3	May 24	@ New York	L 81–88	Arike Ogunbowale (24)	Kayla Thornton (11)	Tyasha Harris (7)	Barclays Center; 894	1–2
4	May 27	@ Atlanta	L 95–101	Mabrey; Ogunbowale (24)	Isabelle Harrison (9)	Moriah Jefferson (4)	Gateway Center Arena; 711	1–3
5	May 29	Phoenix	L 85–89	Mabrey; Ogunbowale (24)	Marina Mabrey (8)	Isabelle Harrison (3)	College Park Center; 1,717	1–4

June : 7–5 (Home: 3–2; Road: 4–3)

Game	Date	Team	Score	High points	High rebounds	High assists	Location Attendance	Record
6	June 1	Los Angeles	W 69–79	Tyasha Harris (18)	Collier; Mabrey; Thornton (7)	Jefferson; Mabrey (6)	College Park Center; 1,372	2–4
7	June 4	@ Seattle	L 102–105 (OT)	Marina Mabrey (24)	Satou Sabally (9)	Arike Ogunbowale (8)	Angel of the Winds Arena; 1,467	2–5
8	June 6	@ Seattle	W 68–67	Arike Ogunbowale (24)	Isabelle Harrison (8)	Arike Ogunbowale (3)	Angel of the Winds Arena; 1,930	3–5
9	June 9	@ Phoenix	W 85–81	Arike Ogunbowale (22)	Isabelle Harrison (9)	Tyasha Harris (7)	Phoenix Suns Arena; 3,618	4–5
10	June 11	@ Phoenix	W 77–59	Arike Ogunbowale (20)	Bella Alarie (9)	Harris; Sabally (4)	Phoenix Suns Arena; 4,261	5–5
11	June 13	@ Las Vegas	L 78–85	Satou Sabally (24)	Isabelle Harrison (9)	Arike Ogunbowale (8)	Michelob Ultra Arena; No Fans	5–6
12	June 17	Minnesota	L 73–85	Arike Ogunbowale (20)	Bella Alarie (6)	Moriah Jefferson (4)	College Park Center; 1,519	5–7
13	June 19	Minnesota	W 95–77	Marina Mabrey (28)	Bella Alarie (8)	Arike Ogunbowale (6)	College Park Center; 1,751	6–7
14	June 22	@ Connecticut	L 70–80	Arike Ogunbowale (18)	Marina Mabrey (5)	Arike Ogunbowale (5)	Mohegan Sun Arena; 2,076	6–8
15	June 24	@ Indiana	W 89–64	Satou Sabally (15)	Satou Sabally (9)	Arike Ogunbowale (5)	Indiana Farmers Coliseum; No Fans	7–8
16	June 26	Washington	W 85–74	Arike Ogunbowale (30)	Sabally; Thornton (8)	Satou Sabally (5)	College Park Center; 2,055	8–8
17	June 30	Chicago	L 81–91	Isabelle Harrison (23)	Isabelle Harrison (8)	Mabrey; Ogunbowale (4)	College Park Center; 1,778	8–9

July : 1–3 (Home: 1–1; Road: 0–2)

Game	Date	Team	Score	High points	High rebounds	High assists	Location Attendance	Record
18	July 2	Chicago	W 100–91	Marina Mabrey (28)	Satou Sabally (9)	Satou Sabally (6)	College Park Center; 2,187	9–9
19	July 5	@ New York	L 96–99	Isabelle Harrison (23)	Harrison; Mabrey; Sabally (7)	Moriah Jefferson (6)	Barclays Center; 1,677	9–10
20	July 7	@ Minnesota	L 79–85	Allisha Gray (13)	Satou Sabally (6)	Satou Sabally (7)	Target Center; 2,321	9–11
21	July 11	Las Vegas	L 79–95	Gray; Jefferson (14)	Satou Sabally (9)	Harris; Harrison; Ogunbowale; Sabally (3)	College Park Center; 2,533	9–12

August : 2–3 (Home: 0–2; Road: 2–1)

Game	Date	Team	Score	High points	High rebounds	High assists	Location Attendance	Record
22	August 15	Connecticut	L 59–80	Arike Ogunbowale (20)	Isabelle Harrison (5)	Arike Ogunbowale (5)	College Park Center; 2,399	9–13
23	August 17	@ Chicago	W 80–76	Allisha Gray (20)	Kayla Thornton (10)	Moriah Jefferson (8)	Wintrust Arena; 3,902	10–13
24	August 20	Indiana	L 81–83	Isabelle Harrison (22)	Isabelle Harrison (7)	Arike Ogunbowale (6)	College Park Center; 2,017	10–14
25	August 26	@ Washington	W 82–77	Arike Ogunbowale (26)	Isabelle Harrison (10)	Arike Ogunbowale (9)	Entertainment and Sports Arena; 2,465	11–14
26	August 28	@ Washington Mystics	L 75–76	Arike Ogunbowale (25)	Isabelle Harrison (9)	Marina Mabrey (5)	Entertainment and Sports Arena; 2,410	11–15

September : 3–3 (Home: 3–2; Road: 0–1)

Game	Date	Team	Score	High points	High rebounds	High assists	Location Attendance	Record
27	September 2	Atlanta	W 72–68	Allisha Gray (19)	Gray; Harrison (10)	Moriah Jefferson (6)	College Park Center; 1,975	12–15
28	September 5	Atlanta	L 64–69	Arike Ogunbowale (21)	Allisha Gray (14)	Tyasha Harris (6)	College Park Center; 2,386	12–16
29	September 7	Connecticut	L 56–83	Marina Mabrey (16)	Awak Kuier (8)	Alarie; Harris; Kuier; Ogunbowale (2)	College Park Center; 1,945	12–17
30	September 11	New York	W 77–76	Marina Mabrey (21)	Allisha Gray (11)	Marina Mabrey (6)	College Park Center; 2,888	13–17
31	September 13	@ Las Vegas	L 75–85	Arike Ogunbowale (23)	Collier; Ogunbowale (8)	Marina Mabrey (7)	Michelob Ultra Arena; N/A	13–18
32	September 19	Los Angeles	W 87–84	Arike Ogunbowale (20)	Allisha Gray (7)	Marina Mabrey (5)	College Park Center; 3,604	14–18

2021 season schedule

=== Playoffs ===
2021 playoff game log
Total: 0–1
First round

Game	Date	Team	Score	High points	High rebounds	High assists	Location Attendance	Series
1	September 23	@ Chicago	64–81	Arike Ogunbowale (22)	Isabelle Harrison (10)	Moriah Jefferson (4)	Wintrust Arena; 4,672	0–1

2021 playoff schedule

== Standings ==
#	Team	W	L	PCT	GB	Conf.	Home	Road	Cup
1	x – Connecticut Sun	26	6	.813	–	12–3	15–1	11–5	9–1
2	x – Las Vegas Aces	24	8	.750	2	11–4	13–3	11–5	6–4
3	x – Minnesota Lynx	22	10	.688	4	10–5	13–3	9–7	7–3
4	x – Seattle Storm	21	11	.656	5	9–6	11–5	10–6	8–2
5	x – Phoenix Mercury	19	13	.594	7	6–9	7–9	12–4	5–5
6	x – Chicago Sky	16	16	.500	10	10–5	6–10	10–6	6–4
7	x – Dallas Wings	14	18	.438	12	7–8	7–9	7–9	3–7
8	x – New York Liberty	12	20	.375	14	6–9	7–9	5–11	5–5
9	e – Washington Mystics	12	20	.375	14	7–8	8–8	4–12	4–6
10	e – Los Angeles Sparks	12	20	.375	14	2–13	8–8	4–12	1–9
11	e – Atlanta Dream	8	24	.250	18	6–9	4–12	4–12	4–6
12	e – Indiana Fever	6	26	.188	20	4–11	4–12	2–14	2–8

Notes

(#) – League Standing
x – Clinched playoff berth
e – Eliminated from playoff contention
Source: Overall standings and Commissioner's Cup Standings

== Playoffs ==
**First round** single elimination Sept. 23
**5**	**Phoenix Mercury**	**83**
8	New York Liberty	82
**6**	**Chicago Sky**	**81**
7	Dallas Wings	64

**Second round** single elimination Sept. 26
4	Seattle Storm	80
**5**	**Phoenix Mercury**	**85^{OT}**
3	Minnesota Lynx	76
**6**	**Chicago Sky**	**89**

**Semifinals**; Best-of-5; Sept. 28 – Oct. 8
2	Las Vegas Aces	2
**5**	**Phoenix Mercury**	**3**
1	Connecticut Sun	1
**6**	**Chicago Sky**	**3**

**Finals**; Best-of-5; Oct. 10 – 17
5	Phoenix Mercury	1
**6**	**Chicago Sky**	**3**

Note: Teams re-seeded after each round.

- **Bold** – Game or series winner
- Italic – Team with home-court advantage

== Statistics ==
Legend
GP	Games played	GS	Games started	MPG	Minutes per game	RPG	Rebounds per game
APG	Assists per game	SPG	Steals per game	BPG	Blocks per game	PPG	Points per game
FG%	Field-goal percentage	3P%	3-point field-goal percentage	FT%	Free-throw percentage	TO	Turnovers per game
PF	Fouls per game		Team leader		League leader

=== Regular season ===
Player	GP	GS	MPG	FG%	3P%	FT%	RPG	APG	SPG	BPG	PPG
Arike Ogunbowale	32	32	31.3	38.3	37.6	86.4	3.2	3.3	1.2	0.0	18.7
Marina Mabrey	32	8	24.2	40.5	34.2	88.2	3.9	2.9	1.0	0.3	13.3
Allisha Gray	25	16	2.8	43.8	36.6	86.2	5.2	1.7	1.0	0.8	11.9
Satou Sabally	17	14	24.9	41.8	32.7	77.0	5.9	2.8	0.2	0.8	11.9
Isabelle Harrison	28	5	23.8	53.8	0.0	78.3	5.9	1.1	1.1	0.7	10.9
Kayla Thornton	31	25	27.6	42.1	34.9	84.9	5.6	1.5	0.8	0.2	7.5
Moriah Jefferson	29	28	17.2	44.9	46.0	60.0	2.0	2.5	0.8	0.2	5.4
Tyasha Harris	32	3	16.3	33.6	33.9	83.3	1.6	2.7	0.4	0.3	4.4
Charli Collier	28	18	12.3	46.5	0.0	69.6	3.6	0.2	0.1	0.2	3.4
Bella Alarie	31	11	13.1	50.0	0.0	85.0	3.3	0.5	0.6	0.6	2.6
Awak Kuier	16	0	8.9	30.8	16.7	78.6	2.4	0.6	0.3	0.8	2.4
Chelsea Dungee	14	0	4.6	17.6	20.0	0.0	0.2	0.1	0.0	0.1	0.6

== Awards and honors ==
Recipient	Award	Date awarded	Ref.
Arike Ogunbowale	WNBA All-Star Selection	June 30	
Satou Sabally	WNBA All-Star Selection	June 30	
Charli Collier	WNBA All-Rookie Team	October 5	
Arike Ogunbowale	All-WNBA Second Team	October 15	
