= 2021 Los Angeles Sparks season =

- Head coach: Derek Fisher
- Arena: Los Angeles Convention Center; Staples Center

Results
- Record: 12–20 (.375)
- Place: 6th (Western)
- Playoff finish: Did not qualify

Media
- Television: Spectrum SportsNet; ESPN2, CBSSN, NBATV

The 2021 Los Angeles Sparks season was the 25th season for the Los Angeles Sparks of the Women's National Basketball Association. The season tipped off on May 14, 2021, versus the Dallas Wings.

The Sparks split time in two arenas during the 2021 season. They played at the Los Angeles Convention Center from May until July and then played at the Staples Center after the league took its Olympic break.

The Sparks started the season slowly, losing the first two games. However, they won the next two to finish May with a 2–2 record. June proved difficult, as the team couldn't sustain a winning streak, as wins were followed by two losses frequently. They finished June 4–7 and 6–9 overall. The Sparks went into the Olympic break on a low note when they lost all four games in July. After the break, a favorable schedule contributed to a four-game winning streak to begin the August schedule, with wins over Indiana and Atlanta who finished in the bottom two of the final regular season standings. Once the winning streak ended, the Sparks lost six straight games to slide to 10–19 going into the final three games of the season. Despite winning two of the last three, a final day loss meant the Sparks finished outside the playoff places with a 12–20 overall record.

== Transactions ==
=== WNBA draft ===
Round	Pick	Player	Nationality	School/Team/Country
1	7	Jasmine Walker	United States	Alabama
1	10	Stephanie Watts	United States	North Carolina
2	22	Arella Guirantes	Puerto Rico	Rutgers
3	28	Ivana Raca	Serbia	Wake Forest
3	34	Aina Ayuso	Spain	Casademont Zaragoza (Spain)

=== Trades/Roster Changes ===
Date	Details
December 31, 2020	Renounced rights to G Ángela Salvadores
January 6, 2021	Extended Qualifying Offers to G Brittney Sykes and C Marianna Tolo
January 7, 2021	Extended Qualifying Offer to G Te'a Cooper
January 11, 2021	Re-Signed G Te'a Cooper
January 13, 2021	Cored F Nneka Ogwumike
February 2, 2021	Signed G Erica Wheeler
February 8, 2021	Re-Signed G Brittney Sykes
February 11, 2021	Signed C Amanda Zahui B.
February 19, 2021	Signed G Bria Holmes
February 22, 2021	Re-Signed G/F Seimone Augustus
February 25, 2021	Re-Signed F/C Chiney Ogwumike
March 2, 2021	Re-Signed F Nneka Ogwumike
March 4, 2021	Signed G Nia Coffey to a Training Camp Contract
March 16, 2021	Waived C Marie Gülich
April 14, 2021	Acquired the 7th pick in the 2021 WNBA draft and Dallas's 2md Round pick in the 2022 WNBA draft in exchange for the Sparks' 2022 1st Round pick.
April 18, 2021	Waived G Tierra Ruffin-Pratt
April 19, 2021	Signed G Stephanie Watts to a Rookie Scale Contract
April 20, 2021	Signed F Jasmine Walker to a Rookie Scale Contract
May 6, 2021	Signed G Arella Guirantes to a Rookie Scale Contract
May 9, 2021	Traded G Stephanie Watts and the rights to G Leonie Fiebich to Chicago in exchange for G/F Gabby Williams
May 13, 2021	G Seimone Augustus retires and is named an Assistant Coach
May 13, 2021	Traded G Sydney Wiese to Washington in exchange for a 2022 2nd Round Pick.
May 13, 2021	Waived F Kristine Anigwe.
May 13, 2021	Temporarily Suspend C Maria Vadeeva.
May 14, 2021	Signed G/F Gabby Williams to a Contract Extension
June 4, 2021	Signed G Karlie Samuelson and C Kristine Anigwe to Hardship Contracts
June 28, 2021	Released C Kristine Anigwe from the Hardship Contract and Waived G Bria Holmes
June 29, 2021	Released G Karlie Samuelson from the Hardship Contract
June 30, 2021	Signed C Lauren Cox
June 30, 2021	Signed G Karlie Samuelson to a Hardship Contract
June 30, 2021	Signed G Bria Holmes to a Hardship Contract
August 3, 2021	Terminated the Hardship Contracts of Bria Holmes and Karlie Samuelson
August 3, 2021	Signed G Karlie Samuelson to a 7-Day Contract

== Roster ==
2021 Los Angeles Sparks roster
Players
Coaches

Pos.	No.	Nat.	Name	Height	Weight	DOB	From	Yrs
F	12	(United States)	Coffey, Nia	6' 1" (1.85m)	182 lb (83kg)	1995-06-11	Northwestern	4
G	2	(United States)	Cooper, Te'a	5' 8" (1.73m)	160 lb (73kg)	1997-04-16	Baylor	1
F	13	(United States)	Cox, Lauren	6' 4" (1.93m)	205 lb (93kg)	1998-04-20	Baylor	1
G	22	(Puerto Rico)	Guirantes, Arella	5' 11" (1.8m)	165 lb (75kg)	1997-10-15	Rutgers	R
F	30	(United States)	Ogwumike, Nneka	6' 2" (1.88m)	174 lb (79kg)	1990-07-02	Stanford	9
F/C	31	(United States)	Ogwumike, Chiney	6' 3" (1.91m)	183 lb (83kg)	1992-03-21	Stanford	4
G	15	(United States)	Sykes, Brittney	5' 9" (1.75m)	154 lb (70kg)	1994-02-07	Syracuse	4
G	20	(United States)	Toliver, Kristi	5' 7" (1.7m)	130 lb (59kg)	1987-01-27	Maryland	11
C	7	(Russia)	Vadeeva, Maria (S)	6' 4" (1.93m)	185 lb (84kg)	1998-07-16	Russia	2
F	40	(United States)	Walker, Jasmine (injured)	6' 3" (1.91m)	182 lb (83kg)	1998-02-03	Alabama	R
G	17	(United States)	Wheeler, Erica	5' 7" (1.7m)	143 lb (65kg)	1991-05-02	Rutgers	5
C	1	(Sweden)	Zahui B., Amanda	6' 5" (1.96m)	184 lb (83kg)	1993-09-08	Minnesota	6

Head coach
(United States) Derek Fisher (Little Rock)
Assistant coaches
(United States) Latricia Trammell (East Central)
(United States) Fred Williams (Boise State)
(United States) Seimone Augustus (LSU)
Athletic trainer
(United States) Courtney Watson (California)
Strength and conditioning coach
(United States) Kelly Dormandy (Springfield)

Legend

- (C) Team captain
- (DP) Unsigned draft pick
- (FA) Free agent
- (S) Suspended
- Injured

== Game log ==
=== Preseason ===
2021 pre-season game log
May: 1–0 (Home: 0–0; Road: 1–0)

Game	Date	Team	Score	High points	High rebounds	High assists	Location Attendance	Record
1	May 2	@ Las Vegas	W 80–71	Scrimmage			Michelob Ultra Arena; No Fans	1–0
2	May 8	Las Vegas	T 85–85	Jasmine Walker (23)	Jasmine Walker (9)	Wheeler; Cooper (5)	Los Angeles Convention Center; No Fans	1–0–1

2021 pre-season schedule

=== Regular season ===
2021 game log
Total: 12–20 (Home: 8–8; Road: 4–12)
May: 2–2 (Home: 0–1; Road: 2–1)

Game	Date	Team	Score	High points	High rebounds	High assists	Location Attendance	Record
1	May 14	Dallas	L 71–94	Nneka Ogwumike (18)	Nneka Ogwumike (8)	Brittney Sykes (3)	Los Angeles Convention Center; No Fans	0–1
2	May 21	@ Las Vegas	69–97	Nneka Ogwumike (19)	Guirantes; C. Ogwumike; N. Ogwumike (5)	Kristi Toliver (5)	Michelob Ultra Arena; 1,972	0–2
3	May 28	@ Chicago	W 76–61	Nneka Ogwumike (14)	Nneka Ogwumike (9)	Erica Wheeler (6)	Wintrust Arena; 1,124	1–2
4	May 30	@ Chicago	W 82–79	Nneka Ogwumike (21)	Nneka Ogwumike (9)	Erica Wheeler (7)	Wintrust Arena; 1,124	2–2

June : 4–7 (Home: 4–3; Road: 0–4)

Game	Date	Team	Score	High points	High rebounds	High assists	Location Attendance	Record
5	June 1	@ Dallas	L 69–79	Kristi Toliver (14)	Nia Coffey (6)	Te'a Cooper (4)	College Park Center; 1,372	2–3
6	June 3	Indiana	W 98–63	Kristi Toliver (22)	Holmes; Zahui B (7)	Erica Wheeler (5)	Los Angeles Convention Center; 301	3–3
7	June 5	Chicago	W 68–63	Erica Wheeler (22)	Amanda Zahui B (10)	Erica Wheeler (5)	Los Angeles Convention Center; 430	4–3
8	June 10	@ Washington	L 71–89	Te'a Cooper (11)	Kristine Anigwe (9)	Erica Wheeler (4)	Entertainment and Sports Arena; 2,100	4–4
9	June 12	@ Minnesota	L 64–80	Te'a Cooper (17)	Amanda Zahui B (8)	Kristi Toliver (5)	Target Center; 2,203	4–5
10	June 16	Phoenix	W 85–80	Erica Wheeler (18)	Brittney Sykes (9)	Erica Wheeler (10)	Los Angeles Convention Center; 514	5–5
11	June 18	Phoenix	L 66–80	Erica Wheeler (17)	Amanda Zahui B (6)	Toliver; Wheeler (2)	Los Angeles Convention Center; 520	5–6
12	June 20	New York	L 73–76	Erica Wheeler (20)	Erica Wheeler (6)	Erica Wheeler (10)	Los Angeles Convention Center; 731	5–7
13	June 24	Washington	W 89–82	Te'a Cooper (26)	Amanda Zahui B (5)	Te'a Cooper (4)	Los Angeles Convention Center; 520	6–7
14	June 26	@ Phoenix	L 79–88	Erica Wheeler (21)	Kristine Anigwe (9)	Sykes; Wheeler (4)	Phoenix Suns Arena	6–8
15	June 30	Las Vegas	L 75–99	Amanda Zahui B (22)	Amanda Zahui B (9)	Cooper; Wheeler (3)	Los Angeles Convention Center; 746	6–9

July : 0–4 (Home: 0–3; Road: 0–1)

Game	Date	Team	Score	High points	High rebounds	High assists	Location Attendance	Record
16	July 2	Las Vegas	L 58–66	Erica Wheeler (15)	Amanda Zahui B (12)	Erica Wheeler (5)	Los Angeles Convention Center; 959	6–10
17	July 4	Seattle	L 74–84	Sykes; Wheeler (19)	Brittney Sykes (10)	Sykes; Wheeler (5)	Los Angeles Convention Center; 716	6–11
18	July 7	@ Seattle	L 62–71	Erica Wheeler (22)	Amanda Zahui B (9)	Erica Wheeler (3)	Angel of the Winds Arena; 2,730	6–12
19	July 11	Minnesota	L 61–86	Sykes; Wheeler (14)	Lauren Cox (8)	Erica Wheeler (6)	Los Angeles Convention Center; 892	6–13

August : 4–4 (Home: 3–0; Road: 1–4)

Game	Date	Team	Score	High points	High rebounds	High assists	Location Attendance	Record
20	August 15	Indiana	W 75–70	Brittney Sykes (16)	Amanda Zahui B (9)	Toliver; Wheeler (6)	Staples Center; 2,029	7–13
21	August 17	Atlanta	W 85–80 (OT)	Brittney Sykes (17)	Nneka Ogwumike (9)	Nneka Ogwumike (9)	Staples Center; 2,200	8–13
22	August 19	Atlanta	W 66–64	Nneka Ogwumike (17)	Brittney Sykes (8)	Kristi Toliver (5)	Staples Center; 1,885	9–13
23	August 22	@ New York	W 86–83	Erica Wheeler (17)	Brittney Sykes (6)	Nneka Ogwumike (6)	Barclays Center; N/A	10–13
24	August 24	@ Washington	L 68–78	Nia Coffey (15)	Chiney Ogwumike (8)	Toliver; Sykes (3)	Entertainment and Sports Arena; 2,620	10–14
25	August 26	@ Connecticut	L 72–76	Nia Coffey (18)	Brittney Sykes (7)	Erica Wheeler (9)	Mohegan Sun Arena; 3,702	10–15
26	August 28	@ Connecticut	L 61–76	Erica Wheeler (15)	Erica Wheeler (6)	Erica Wheeler (7)	Mohegan Sun Arena; 4,434	10–16
27	August 31	@ Indiana	L 72–74	Nneka Ogwumike (17)	Brittney Sykes (5)	Erica Wheeler (7)	Indiana Farmers Coliseum; N/A	10–17

September : 2–3 (Home: 1–1; Road: 1–2)

Game	Date	Team	Score	High points	High rebounds	High assists	Location Attendance	Record
28	September 2	@ Minnesota	L 57–66	N. Ogwumike; Wheeler (16)	Nneka Ogwumike (10)	Erica Wheeler (7)	Target Center; 3,121	10–18
29	September 9	Connecticut	L 57–75	Coffey; N. Ogwumike (12)	Nneka Ogwumike (7)	N. Ogwumike; Sykes; Wheeler (3)	Staples Center; 1,695	10–19
30	September 12	Seattle	W 81–53	Te'a Cooper (19)	Brittney Sykes (10)	Erica Wheeler (4)	Staples Center; 4,181	11–19
31	September 16	@ Atlanta	W 74–68	Brittney Sykes (17)	Nneka Ogwumike (10)	Erica Wheeler (4)	Gateway Center Arena; 2,537	12–19
32	September 19	@ Dallas	L 84–87	Te'a Cooper (24)	Nneka Ogwumike (10)	Erica Wheeler (7)	College Park Center; 3,604	12–20

2021 season schedule

== Standings ==
#	Team	W	L	PCT	GB	Conf.	Home	Road	Cup
1	x – Connecticut Sun	26	6	.813	–	12–3	15–1	11–5	9–1
2	x – Las Vegas Aces	24	8	.750	2	11–4	13–3	11–5	6–4
3	x – Minnesota Lynx	22	10	.688	4	10–5	13–3	9–7	7–3
4	x – Seattle Storm	21	11	.656	5	9–6	11–5	10–6	8–2
5	x – Phoenix Mercury	19	13	.594	7	6–9	7–9	12–4	5–5
6	x – Chicago Sky	16	16	.500	10	10–5	6–10	10–6	6–4
7	x – Dallas Wings	14	18	.438	12	7–8	7–9	7–9	3–7
8	x – New York Liberty	12	20	.375	14	6–9	7–9	5–11	5–5
9	e – Washington Mystics	12	20	.375	14	7–8	8–8	4–12	4–6
10	e – Los Angeles Sparks	12	20	.375	14	2–13	8–8	4–12	1–9
11	e – Atlanta Dream	8	24	.250	18	6–9	4–12	4–12	4–6
12	e – Indiana Fever	6	26	.188	20	4–11	4–12	2–14	2–8

Notes

(#) – League Standing
x – Clinched playoff berth
e – Eliminated from playoff contention
Source: Overall standings and Commissioner's Cup Standings

== Statistics ==
Legend
GP	Games played	GS	Games started	MPG	Minutes per game	RPG	Rebounds per game
APG	Assists per game	SPG	Steals per game	BPG	Blocks per game	PPG	Points per game
FG%	Field-goal percentage	3P%	3-point field-goal percentage	FT%	Free-throw percentage	TO	Turnovers per game
PF	Fouls per game		Team leader		League leader

=== Regular season ===
Player	GP	GS	MPG	FG%	3P%	FT%	RPG	APG	SPG	BPG	PPG
Nneka Ogwumike	18	18	31.7	53.2	36.7	80.0	6.5	2.7	1.4	0.3	14.5
Erica Wheeler	32	32	30.2	41.7	35.5	82.7	3.1	4.8	1.3	0.3	13.6
Kristi Toliver	19	19	27.6	41.4	33.7	84.2	1.4	2.9	0.7	0.0	9.4
Brittney Sykes	32	20	29.3	40.5	26.2	77.2	4.6	2.2	1.8	0.5	9.4
Amanda Zahui B	30	27	23.8	42.7	28.0	76.7	5.1	1.0	0.6	1.2	9.2
Te'a Cooper	31	13	22.0	37.9	32.4	75.0	1.7	1.4	0.9	0.2	9.1
Nia Coffey	32	17	25.2	42.1	41.7	77.8	3.8	0.9	0.8	1.2	8.3
Chiney Ogwumike	7	3	19.1	40.8	75.0	75.0	4.1	1.1	0.9	0.4	7.0
Lauren Cox	15	0	14.0	41.3	20.0	77.8	3.7	0.6	0.7	0.9	3.5
Arella Guirantes	25	2	11.6	27.4	22.2	80.8	1.3	0.6	0.3	0.2	3.2
Jasmine Walker	2	0	10.0	0.0	0.0	0.0	1.0	1.0	1.0	0.5	0.0
Maria Vadeeva	0	0	0.0	0.0	0.0	0.0	0.0	0.0	0.0	0.0	0.0

== Awards and honors ==
Recipient	Award	Date awarded	Ref.
Brittney Sykes	WNBA All-Defensive First Team	September 26	
Nneka Ogwumike	Kim Perrot Sportsmanship Award	October 3	
