= 2021 Indiana Fever season =

22nd season in the WNBA

- Head coach: Marianne Stanley
- Arena: Bankers Life Fieldhouse; Indiana Farmers Coliseum

Results
- Record: 6–26 (.188)
- Place: 6th (Eastern)
- Playoff finish: Did not qualify

The 2021 Indiana Fever season was the franchise's 22nd season in the Women's National Basketball Association (WNBA). The regular season tipped off on May 14, 2021, at the New York Liberty.

The Fever started the season by losing four games before winning their first game on May 23. The team then went on a twelve-game losing streak, which included going 0–8 during the month of June. However, before the Olympic break, the Fever won three straight games, to end the first portion of the season with a 4–16 record. They lost the first two games in August coming out of the Olympic break, but won two of the next three. The Fever could not maintain that momentum in the final month of the season, finishing 0–7 in September. Their final record of 6–26 matched their win total from last year's shortened season. Their .188 winning percentage was the third lowest in franchise history, only ahead of the 2018 season and 2022. This was the third time in four years the team finished with only 6 wins.

== Transactions ==
=== WNBA draft ===
The Fever made the following selections in the 2021 WNBA draft:

Round	Pick	Player	Nationality	School/Team/Country
1	4	Kysre Gondrezick	United States	West Virginia
2	19	Unique Thompson	United States	Auburn
2	24	Trinity Baptiste	United States	Arizona
3	26	Chelsey Perry	United States	UT Martin
3	31	Florencia Chagas	Argentina	Empoli (Italy)
3	33	Maya Caldwell	United States	Georgia

=== Trades and roster changes ===
Date	Details
December 18, 2020	Exercised Team Options on C Teaira McCowan and F Kennedy Burke
February 1, 2021	Signed F Jantel Lavender
February 3, 2021	Signed G Danielle Robinson
February 8, 2021	Signed G Chanelle Molina to a Training Camp Contract
February 15, 2021	Acquired G Lindsay Allen from Las Vegas and the 24th pick in the 2021 WNBA draft in exchange for the 14th pick in the 2021 Draft.
February 15, 2021	Acquired the Minnesota Lynx's 1st and 3rd round Pick in the 2022 WNBA draft, G Odyssey Sims and negotiating rights to C Temi Fagbenle in exchange for the Fever's 2nd round Pick in the 2022 Draft.
February 15, 2021	Waived G Odyssey Sims
February 16, 2021	Signed F Jessica Breland
March 6, 2021	Signed C Bernadett Határ to a Training Camp Contract
March 17, 2021	Signed G Kelsey Mitchell to a Contract Extension
April 16, 2021	Acquired G Aaliyah Wilson from Seattle in exchange for F Kennedy Burke
April 18, 2021	Signed F Chelsey Perry to a Rookie Scale Contract
April 19, 2021	Signed G Aaliyah Wilson and F Trinity Baptiste to a Rookie Scale Contracts
April 22, 2021	Signed G Kysre Gondrezick to a Rookie Scale Contract
April 22, 2021	Contract Tender made to G Florencia Chagas
April 26, 2021	Waived G Chanelle Molina
April 28, 2021	Signed G Florencia Chagas to a Rookie Scale Contract and Full Season Suspended Her
April 28, 2021	Partial Season Suspended G Julie Allemand due to Overseas Commitments
May 2, 2021	Waived F Maya Caldwell and F Trinity Baptiste
May 12, 2021	Waived G Katheleen Doyle and F Unique Thompson
May 13, 2021	Full Season Suspend G Julie Allemand
May 14, 2021	Temporarily Suspend C Bernadett Határ
May 17, 2021	Waived F Chelsey Perry
May 17, 2021	Activate C Bernadett Határ from Temporarily Suspended List
June 27, 2021	Waived F Lauren Cox
June 28, 2021	Signed F Chelsey Perry
July 28, 2021	Signed F Emma Cannon to 7-Day Contract
August 22, 2021	Signed F Emma Cannon to a 2nd 7-Day Contract
August 29, 2021	Signed F Emma Cannon to a 3rd 7-Day Contract
September 6, 2021	Signed F Emma Cannon to a Rest of Season Contract

== Roster ==
2021 Indiana Fever roster
Players
Coaches

Pos.	No.	Nat.	Name	Height	Weight	DOB	From	Yrs
G	12	(United States)	Allen, Lindsay	5' 8" (1.73m)	189 lb (86kg)	1995-03-20	Notre Dame	3
G	20	(Belgium)	Allemand, Julie (S)	5' 8" (1.73m)	147 lb (67kg)	1996-07-07	Belgium	1
F	51	(United States)	Breland, Jessica	6' 2" (1.88m)	166 lb (75kg)	1988-02-23	North Carolina	8
F	32	(United States)	Cannon, Emma	6' 2" (1.88m)	190 lb (86kg)	1989-06-01	Florida Southern	2
G	4	(United States)	Gondrezick, Kysre	5' 9" (1.75m)	150 lb (68kg)	1997-07-27	West Virginia	R
C	44	(Hungary)	Határ, Bernadett (injured)	6' 10" (2.08m)	208 lb (94kg)	1994-08-24	Hungary	R
F	14	(United States)	Lavender, Jantel	6' 4" (1.93m)	185 lb (84kg)	1988-11-12	Ohio State	9
C	15	(United States)	McCowan, Teaira	6' 7" (2.01m)	239 lb (108kg)	1996-09-28	Mississippi State	2
G	25	(United States)	Mitchell, Tiffany	5' 9" (1.75m)	152 lb (69kg)	1994-09-23	South Carolina	5
G	0	(United States)	Mitchell, Kelsey	5' 8" (1.73m)	160 lb (73kg)	1995-11-12	Ohio State	3
F	10	(United States)	Perry, Chelsey (injured)	6' 2" (1.88m)	164 lb (74kg)	1999-06-07	UT Martin	R
G	3	(United States)	Robinson, Danielle (injured)	5' 9" (1.75m)	137 lb (62kg)	1989-05-10	Oklahoma	9
G	35	(United States)	Vivians, Victoria	6' 1" (1.85m)	183 lb (83kg)	1994-11-17	Mississippi State	2
G	1	(United States)	Wilson, Aaliyah	5' 10" (1.78m)	172 lb (78kg)	1998-08-28	Texas A&M	R

Head coach
(United States) Marianne Stanley (Immaculata)
Assistant coaches
(United States) Steve Smith
(United States) Jhared Simpson (Wheeling)
(United States) Vicki Hall (Texas)
Athletic trainer
(United States) Garrett Hueber
Strength and conditioning coach
(United States) Shannon Patterson

Legend

- (C) Team captain
- (DP) Unsigned draft pick
- (FA) Free agent
- (S) Suspended
- Injured

== Game log ==
=== Preseason ===
2021 pre-season game log
May: 1–1 (Home: 1–0; Road: 0–1)

Game	Date	Team	Score	High points	High rebounds	High assists	Location Attendance	Record
1	May 9	Chicago	W 82–65	T. Mitchell; Perry (16)	Teaira McCowan (12)	Tiffany Mitchell (4)	Bankers Life Fieldhouse; No Fans	1–0
2	May 11	@ Chicago	L 70–83	Victoria Vivians (15)	Teaira McCowan (6)	Chelsey Perry (4)	Wintrust Arena; No Fans	1–1

2021 pre-season schedule

=== Regular season ===
2021 game log
Total: 6–26 (Home: 4–12; Road: 2–14)
May: 1–7 (Home: 1–3; Road: 0–4)

Game	Date	Team	Score	High points	High rebounds	High assists	Location Attendance	Record
1	May 14	@ New York	L 87–90	Kelsey Mitchell (23)	Teaira McCowan (16)	Danielle Robinson (4)	Barclays Center; 1,139	0–1
2	May 16	New York	L 65–73	Kelsey Mitchell (16)	Jantel Lavender (15)	Danielle Robinson (5)	Bankers Life Fieldhouse; No Fans	0–2
3	May 19	@ Connecticut	L 67–88	Danielle Robinson (12)	Teaira McCowan (6)	Danielle Robinson (3)	Mohegan Sun Arena; 2,084	0–3
4	May 21	Atlanta	L 79–83	Kelsey Mitchell (19)	Jessica Breland (16)	Tiffany Mitchell (6)	Bankers Life Fieldhouse; No Fans	0–4
5	May 23	Washington	W 89–77	Kelsey Mitchell (18)	Breland; McCowan (10)	Danielle Robinson (6)	Bankers Life Fieldhouse; No Fans	1–4
6	May 25	Washington	L 69–85	Tiffany Mitchell (11)	Breland; McCowan (7)	Jessica Breland (5)	Bankers Life Fieldhouse; No Fans	1–5
7	May 28	@ Las Vegas	L 77–113	Tiffany Mitchell (17)	Teaira McCowan (10)	K. Mitchell; Robinson (4)	Michelob Ultra Arena; No Fans	1–6
8	May 30	@ Las Vegas	L 78–101	Victoria Vivians (17)	Teaira McCowan (9)	Allen; Breland (4)	Michelob Ultra Arena; 1,981	1–7

June : 0–8 (Home: 0–4; Road: 0–4)

Game	Date	Team	Score	High points	High rebounds	High assists	Location Attendance	Record
9	June 1	@ Seattle	L 73–88	Breland; McCowan (12)	Teaira McCowan (14)	Lindsay Allen (6)	Angel of the Winds Arena; 1,215	1–8
10	June 3	@ Los Angeles	L 63–98	Kelsey Mitchell (15)	Danielle Robinson (8)	Kelsey Mitchell (5)	Los Angeles Convention Center; 301	1–9
11	June 9	@ Chicago	L 76–92	Kelsey Mitchell (24)	Jessica Breland (9)	Jessica Breland (6)	Wintrust Arena; 1,090	1–10
12	June 12	Chicago	L 79–83	Teaira McCowan (20)	Teaira McCowan (13)	Lindsay Allen (6)	Indiana Farmers Coliseum; No Fans	1–11
13	June 15	Seattle	L 70–87	Kelsey Mitchell (26)	Jessica Breland (9)	K. Mitchell; T. Mitchell (4)	Indiana Farmers Coliseum; No Fans	1–12
14	June 17	Seattle	L 69–79	Teaira McCowan (13)	Jessica Breland (11)	Kelsey Mitchell (4)	Indiana Farmers Coliseum; No Fans	1–13
15	June 19	@ Washington	L 77–82	Danielle Robinson (19)	Jessica Breland (10)	Danielle Robinson (6)	Entertainment and Sports Arena; 2,100	1–14
16	June 24	Dallas	L 64–89	Kelsey Mitchell (24)	Jessica Breland (7)	Danielle Robinson (4)	Indiana Farmers Coliseum; No Fans	1–15

July : 3–1 (Home: 2–1; Road: 1–0)

Game	Date	Team	Score	High points	High rebounds	High assists	Location Attendance	Record
17	July 1	Connecticut	L 80–86	Kelsey Mitchell (21)	Teaira McCowan (8)	Danielle Robinson (7)	Indiana Farmers Coliseum; No Fans	1–16
18	July 3	Connecticut	W 73–67	Danielle Robinson (19)	Teaira McCowan (12)	T. Mitchell; Robinson (2)	Indiana Farmers Coliseum; No Fans	2–16
19	July 9	New York	W 82–69	Kelsey Mitchell (20)	Teaira McCowan (9)	T. Mitchell; Robinson (5)	Indiana Farmers Coliseum; No Fans	3–16
20	July 11	@ Atlanta	W 79–68	Teaira McCowan (21)	Teaira McCowan (14)	Danielle Robinson (9)	Gateway Center Arena; 1,897	4–16

August : 2–3 (Home: 1–1; Road: 1–2)

Game	Date	Team	Score	High points	High rebounds	High assists	Location Attendance	Record
21	August 15	@ Los Angeles	L 70–75	Kelsey Mitchell (20)	Jessica Breland (8)	Tiffany Mitchell (3)	Staples Center; 2,029	4–17
22	August 17	@ Phoenix	L 80–84	Kelsey Mitchell (20)	Teaira McCowan (10)	K. Mitchell; Robinson; Vivians (3)	Phoenix Suns Arena; 4,089	4–18
23	August 20	@ Dallas	W 83–81	Danielle Robinson (18)	McCowan; Vivians (6)	Allen; Robinson (5)	College Park Center; 2,017	5–18
24	August 28	Las Vegas	L 71–87	K. Mitchell; T. Mitchell (15)	Teaira McCowan (13)	Teaira McCowan (7)	Indiana Farmers Coliseum; N/A	5–19
25	August 31	Los Angeles	W 74–72	Kelsey Mitchell (25)	Teaira McCowan (19)	Allen; Breland; K. Mitchell; Vivians (2)	Indiana Farmers Coliseum; N/A	6–19

September : 0–7 (Home: 0–3; Road: 0–4)

Game	Date	Team	Score	High points	High rebounds	High assists	Location Attendance	Record
26	September 4	Phoenix	L 65–87	Kelsey Mitchell (18)	Breland; McCowan (8)	Lindsay Allen (3)	Indiana Farmers Coliseum; N/A	6–20
27	September 6	Phoenix	L 81–86	Kelsey Mitchell (23)	Teaira McCowan (15)	Lindsay Allen (7)	Indiana Farmers Coliseum; N/A	6–21
28	September 10	@ Minnesota	L 72–89	Tiffany Mitchell (16)	Lavender; McCowan (9)	Lindsay Allen (6)	Target Center; 3,503	6–22
29	September 12	@ Minnesota	L 80–90	Kelsey Mitchell (25)	Teaira McCowan (8)	Victoria Vivians (7)	Target Center; 3,434	6–23
30	September 14	@ Atlanta	L 78–85	Kelsey Mitchell (18)	Teaira McCowan (14)	Allen; Cannon (5)	Gateway Center Arena; 1,208	6–24
31	September 17	Minnesota	L 73–92	Kelsey Mitchell (26)	Teaira McCowan (12)	Lindsay Allen (7)	Indiana Farmers Coliseum; N/A	6–25
32	September 19	@ Chicago	L 87–98	Kelsey Mitchell (32)	Teaira McCowan (9)	Lindsay Allen (10)	Wintrust Arena; N/A	6–26

2021 season schedule

== Standings ==
#	Team	W	L	PCT	GB	Conf.	Home	Road	Cup
1	x – Connecticut Sun	26	6	.813	–	12–3	15–1	11–5	9–1
2	x – Las Vegas Aces	24	8	.750	2	11–4	13–3	11–5	6–4
3	x – Minnesota Lynx	22	10	.688	4	10–5	13–3	9–7	7–3
4	x – Seattle Storm	21	11	.656	5	9–6	11–5	10–6	8–2
5	x – Phoenix Mercury	19	13	.594	7	6–9	7–9	12–4	5–5
6	x – Chicago Sky	16	16	.500	10	10–5	6–10	10–6	6–4
7	x – Dallas Wings	14	18	.438	12	7–8	7–9	7–9	3–7
8	x – New York Liberty	12	20	.375	14	6–9	7–9	5–11	5–5
9	e – Washington Mystics	12	20	.375	14	7–8	8–8	4–12	4–6
10	e – Los Angeles Sparks	12	20	.375	14	2–13	8–8	4–12	1–9
11	e – Atlanta Dream	8	24	.250	18	6–9	4–12	4–12	4–6
12	e – Indiana Fever	6	26	.188	20	4–11	4–12	2–14	2–8

Notes

(#) – League Standing
x – Clinched playoff berth
e – Eliminated from playoff contention
Source: Overall standings and Commissioner's Cup Standings

== Awards and honors ==
Recipient	Award	Date awarded	Ref.

== Statistics ==
Legend
GP	Games played	GS	Games started	MPG	Minutes per game	RPG	Rebounds per game
APG	Assists per game	SPG	Steals per game	BPG	Blocks per game	PPG	Points per game
FG%	Field-goal percentage	3P%	3-point field-goal percentage	FT%	Free-throw percentage	TO	Turnovers per game
PF	Fouls per game		Team leader		League leader

=== Regular season ===
Player	GP	GS	MPG	FG%	3P%	FT%	RPG	APG	SPG	BPG	PPG
Kelsey Mitchell	32	32	33.1	43.1	33.5	88.2	2.6	2.5	1.1	0.2	17.8
Tiffany Mitchell	28	25	27.3	42.1	25.5	88.0	2.9	2.0	0.6	0.0	12.0
Teaira McCowan	32	23	26.5	53.7	0.0	64.4	9.6	1.1	0.6	1.6	11.3
Danielle Robinson	24	24	27.5	41.7	20.0	88.9	3.5	3.7	1.5	0.1	9.9
Emma Cannon	12	6	18.4	44.3	21.4	71.4	4.5	1.0	0.4	0.2	6.9
Victoria Vivians	31	8	21.3	33.3	25.2	83.3	3.1	1.3	1.1	0.1	6.8
Jantel Lavender	27	14	20.0	40.4	20.0	90.0	3.9	1.5	0.0	0.1	6.4
Jessica Breland	26	18	20.9	37.0	31.3	68.4	6.3	2.0	0.6	1.5	5.8
Lindsay Allen	32	8	17.8	42.8	29.8	81.1	1.5	3.0	0.5	0.1	5.4
Bernadett Határ	7	2	15.1	48.3	0.0	85.7	2.6	0.3	0.4	0.4	4.9
Chelsey Perry	6	0	6.7	27.8	22.2	50.0	1.0	0.3	0.5	0.0	2.2
Kysre Gondrezick	19	0	9.1	28.3	28.6	50.0	1.0	0.9	0.4	0.0	1.9
Aaliyah Wilson	14	0	8.5	23.1	14.3	50.0	0.9	0.6	0.2	0.1	1.1
