= 2021 New York Liberty season =

- Head coach: Walt Hopkins
- Arena: Barclays Center

Results
- Record: 12–20 (.375)
- Place: 3rd (Eastern)
- Playoff finish: 8th seed, Lost in the First Round to Phoenix Mercury

Media
- Television: YES

The 2021 New York Liberty season was the 25th season for the New York Liberty franchise of the WNBA. The Liberty opened the regular season on May 14, 2021 versus the Indiana Fever.

The Liberty started the season strong by winning their first three games and only losing two of their seven games in May. However, June turned into a much worse month for the team as wins were book-ended by two losses. The team finished 3–7 in June. Things looked to be turning around in July as the Liberty won their first two games, but they lost their last two games of the month to take a 10–11 overall record into the Olympic break. The post-Olympic break stretch of the season proved difficult for the Liberty. They won their second game out of the break after losing their first, but then went on an eight game losing streak that stretched into September. Going into the last game of the season, the Liberty were part of a three way tie for the eighth, and final playoff seed. The Liberty defeated Washington and Los Angeles lost their final game, so the Liberty won the tiebreaker and qualified for the playoffs as the eighth seed with a final record of 12–20.

As the eighth seed, the Liberty played the fifth seeded Phoenix Mercury in Phoenix in the First Round. The game was more competitive than many expected and it came down to the wire. However, the Liberty were edged out 82–83 and their season came to an end.

== Transactions ==
=== WNBA draft ===
| Round | Pick | Player | Nationality | School/Team/Country |
|---|---|---|---|---|
| 1 | 6 | Michaela Onyenwere | United States | UCLA |
| 2 | 17 | DiDi Richards | United States | Baylor |
| 3 | 25 | Valerie Higgins | United States | Pacific |
| 3 | 29 | Marine Fauthoux | France | ASVEL Féminin (France) |

=== Trades/Roster Changes ===
| Date | Details |
|---|---|
| September 13, 2020 | Signed C Kiah Stokes to a Contract Extension |
| January 2, 2021 | Extended Qualifying Offers to F Nayo Raincock-Ekunwe, G Paris Kea, and F Joyner Holmes |
| January 3, 2021 | Exercised Team Options on G Asia Durr and C Han Xu |
| February 2, 2021 | Signed G/F Betnijah Laney |
| February 2, 2021 | Signed F Joyner Holmes to a Training Camp Contract |
| February 10, 2021 | Traded G Kia Nurse and F Megan Walker to Phoenix in exchange for the 6th Overall Pick in the 2021 Draft and the Mercury's 1st Round Pick in 2022. |
| February 10, 2021 | Traded the 1st Overall Pick in the 2021 Draft, a 2nd Round Pick in 2022 (via trade with Phoenix), and New York's own 2022 2nd Round Pick to Seattle in exchange for F Natasha Howard |
| February 10, 2021 | Traded the rights to F Stephanie Talbot to Seattle in exchange for G Sami Whitcomb |
| April 14, 2021 | Signed F Asia Taylor to a Training Camp Contract |
| April 16, 2021 | Full Season Suspend C Han Xu due to Overseas Commitments |
| April 19, 2021 | Signed F Michaela Onyenwere, G Valerie Higgins, and G DiDi Richards to Rookie Scale Contracts |
| April 24, 2021 | Signed F Janelle Bailey to a Rookie Scale Contract |
| April 26, 2021 | Hired Jacki Gemelos as an Assistant Coach |
| April 26, 2021 | Signed G Rebecca Allen |
| May 7, 2021 | Waived F Janelle Bailey |
| May 11, 2021 | Waived G Valerie Higgins |
| May 12, 2021 | Temporarily Suspend G Rebecca Allen, F Natasha Howard, and C Kiah Stokes due to Overseas Commitments |
| May 12, 2021 | Full Season Suspend G Asia Durr |
| May 12, 2021 | Waive F Joyner Holmes |
| May 13, 2021 | Waive F Asia Taylor and G Jasmine Bailey |
| May 13, 2021 | Full Season Suspend G Marine Johannès due to Overseas Commitments |
| May 14, 2021 | Signed F Reshanda Gray to a Hardship Contract |
| May 14, 2021 | Signed F Joyner Holmes to a Hardship Contract |
| May 15, 2021 | Activate G Rebecca Allen from Temporary Suspension List |
| May 15, 2021 | Released F Joyner Holmes from the Hardship Contract |
| May 18, 2021 | Activate C Kiah Stokes from Temporary Suspension List |
| May 18, 2021 | Released F Reshanda Gray from the Hardship Contract |
| May 20, 2021 | Waived G Layshia Clarendon |
| May 22, 2021 | Activate F Natasha Howard from Temporary Suspension List |
| June 6, 2021 | Suspend C Kiah Stokes due to Overseas Commitments |
| June 7, 2021 | Signed F Reshanda Gray to a Hardship Contract |
| June 22, 2021 | Release F Reshanda Gray to a Hardship Contract |
| June 22, 2021 | Activate C Kiah Stokes from Temporary Suspension |
| June 30, 2021 | Waived C Kiah Stokes |
| July 1, 2021 | Signed F Reshanda Gray |

== Roster ==
2021 New York Liberty roster
Players
Coaches

| Pos. | No. | Nat. | Name | Height | Weight | DOB | From | Yrs |
|---|---|---|---|---|---|---|---|---|
| G/F | 9 | (Australia) | Allen, Rebecca | 6' 2" (1.88m) | 162 lb (73kg) | 1992-11-06 | Australia | 5 |
| F | 1 | (United States) | Gray, Reshanda | 6' 2" (1.88m) | 192 lb (87kg) | 1993-06-01 | California | 4 |
| F | 6 | (United States) | Howard, Natasha | 6' 2" (1.88m) | 165 lb (75kg) | 1991-09-02 | Florida State | 7 |
| G | 20 | (United States) | Ionescu, Sabrina | 5' 11" (1.8m) | 165 lb (75kg) | 1997-12-06 | Oregon | 1 |
| G | 4 | (United States) | Jones, Jazmine | 6' 0" (1.83m) | 160 lb (73kg) | 1996-10-15 | Louisville | 1 |
| G/F | 44 | (United States) | Laney, Betnijah | 6' 0" (1.83m) | 166 lb (75kg) | 1993-10-29 | Rutgers | 5 |
| F | 0 | (United States) | Odom, Leaonna | 6' 2" (1.88m) | 168 lb (76kg) | 1998-03-26 | Duke | 1 |
| F | 12 | (United States) | Onyenwere, Michaela | 6' 0" (1.83m) | 178 lb (81kg) | 1999-08-10 | UCLA | R |
| G/F | 2 | (United States) | Richards, DiDi | 6' 2" (1.88m) | 164 lb (74kg) | 1999-02-08 | Baylor | R |
| C | 24 | (United States) | Shook, Kylee | 6' 5" (1.96m) | 200 lb (91kg) | 1998-03-18 | Louisville | 1 |
| G | 32 | (Australia) | Whitcomb, Sami | 5' 10" (1.78m) | 145 lb (66kg) | 1988-07-20 | Washington | 4 |
| G/F | 13 | (United States) | Willoughby, Jocelyn (injured) | 6' 0" (1.83m) | 180 lb (82kg) | 1998-03-25 | Virginia | R |

Head coach
(United States) Walt Hopkins (Nevada)
Assistant coaches
(United States) Shelley Patterson (Washington State)
(United States) Dustin Gray (Arizona State)
(United States) Jacki Gemelos (USC)

Legend

- (C) Team captain
- (DP) Unsigned draft pick
- (FA) Free agent
- (S) Suspended
- Injured

== Game log ==
=== Preseason ===
2021 pre-season game log
May: 0–0 (Home: 0–0; Road: 0–0)

| Game | Date | Team | Score | High points | High rebounds | High assists | Location Attendance | Record |
|---|---|---|---|---|---|---|---|---|
| 1 | May 3 | @ Connecticut | Scrimmage | | | | Mohegan Sun Arena; 0 | 0–0 |
| 2 | May 11 | Dallas | Scrimmage | | | | Barclays Center | 0–0 |

2021 pre-season schedule

=== Regular season ===
2021 game log
Total: 12–20 (Home: 7–9; Road: 5–11)
May: 5–2 (Home: 3–1; Road: 2–1)

| Game | Date | Team | Score | High points | High rebounds | High assists | Location Attendance | Record |
|---|---|---|---|---|---|---|---|---|
| 1 | May 14 | Indiana | W 90–87 | Betnijah Laney (30) | Sabrina Ionescu (6) | Sabrina Ionescu (11) | Barclays Center; 1,139 | 1–0 |
| 2 | May 16 | @ Indiana | W 73-65 | Betnijah Laney (20) | Kylee Shook (7) | Laney; Whitcomb; Ionescu (4) | Bankers Life Fieldhouse; No Fans | 2–0 |
| 3 | May 18 | Minnesota | W 86–75 | Sabrina Ionescu (26) | Sabrina Ionescu (10) | Sabrina Ionescu (12) | Barclays Center; 815 | 3–0 |
| 4 | May 21 | @ Washington | L 72–101 | Betnijah Laney (20) | Sami Whitcomb (7) | Ionescu; Laney (5) | Entertainment and Sports Arena; No Fans | 3–1 |
| 5 | May 23 | @ Chicago | W 93–85 | Betnijah Laney (20) | Natasha Howard (7) | Sabrina Ionescu (12) | Wintrust Arena; 1,332 | 4–1 |
| 6 | May 24 | Dallas | W 88–81 | Betnijah Laney (26) | Sabrina Ionescu (9) | DiDi Richards (5) | Barclays Center; 894 | 5–1 |
| 7 | May 29 | Atlanta | L 87–90 | Michaela Onyenwere (29) | Laney; Stokes (6) | Betnijah Laney (11) | Barclays Center; 1,235 | 5–2 |

June : 3–7 (Home: 0–3; Road: 3–4)

| Game | Date | Team | Score | High points | High rebounds | High assists | Location Attendance | Record |
|---|---|---|---|---|---|---|---|---|
| 8 | June 3 | Las Vegas | L 82–94 | Betnijah Laney (23) | Kiah Stokes (13) | Sabrina Ionescu (9) | Barclays Center; 1,389 | 5–3 |
| 9 | June 5 | @ Connecticut | L 64–85 | Rebecca Allen (14) | Sami Whitcomb (5) | Betnijah Laney (6) | Mohegan Sun Arena; 2,118 | 5–4 |
| 10 | June 13 | @ Phoenix | W 85–83 | Betnijah Laney (23) | Jones; Laney (7) | Betnijah Laney (10) | Phoenix Suns Arena; 4,476 | 6–4 |
| 11 | June 15 | @ Las Vegas | L 78–100 | Jazmine Jones (17) | Kylee Shook (9) | Betnijah Laney (6) | Michelob Ultra Arena; 2,115 | 6–5 |
| 12 | June 17 | @ Las Vegas | L 76–103 | Betnijah Laney (20) | Sami Whitcomb (6) | Sami Whitcomb (5) | Michelob Ultra Arena; No Fans | 6–6 |
| 13 | June 20 | @ Los Angeles | W 76–73 | Rebecca Allen (19) | Sami Whitcomb (9) | Betnijah Laney (5) | Los Angeles Convention Center; 731 | 7–6 |
| 14 | June 22 | Chicago | L 72–92 | Betnijah Laney (18) | Sabrina Ionescu (8) | Sabrina Ionescu (7) | Barclays Center; 1,419 | 7–7 |
| 15 | June 24 | Chicago | L 68–91 | Michaela Onyenwere (16) | Kylee Shook (11) | Sabrina Ionescu (5) | Barclays Center; 2,148 | 7–8 |
| 16 | June 26 | @ Atlanta | W 101–78 | Sami Whitcomb (30) | Kylee Shook (11) | Sabrina Ionescu (8) | Gateway Center Arena; 1,605 | 8–8 |
| 17 | June 29 | @ Atlanta | L 69–73 | Betnijah Laney (16) | Kylee Shook (8) | Betnijah Laney (7) | Gateway Center Arena; 1,131 | 8–9 |

July : 2–2 (Home: 2–1; Road: 0–1)

| Game | Date | Team | Score | High points | High rebounds | High assists | Location Attendance | Record |
|---|---|---|---|---|---|---|---|---|
| 18 | July 3 | Washington | W 82–79 | Betnijah Laney (19) | Sami Whitcomb (9) | Sabrina Ionescu (5) | Barclays Center; 1,615 | 9–9 |
| 19 | July 5 | Dallas | W 99–96 | Sami Whitcomb (26) | Kylee Shook (8) | Sabrina Ionescu (12) | Barclays Center; 1,677 | 10–9 |
| 20 | July 9 | @ Indiana | L 69–82 | Betnijah Laney (23) | Betnijah Laney (8) | Ionescu; Laney; Shook (4) | Indiana Farmers Coliseum; No Fans | 10–10 |
| 21 | July 11 | Connecticut | L 54–71 | Kylee Shook (16) | Ionescu; Whitcomb (7) | Ionescu; Richards; Whitcomb (3) | Barclays Center | 10–11 |

August : 1–6 (Home: 1–4; Road: 0–2)

| Game | Date | Team | Score | High points | High rebounds | High assists | Location Attendance | Record |
|---|---|---|---|---|---|---|---|---|
| 22 | August 15 | @ Minnesota | L 78–88 | Natasha Howard (30) | Sabrina Ionescu (7) | Sabrina Ionescu (6) | Target Center; 3,534 | 10–12 |
| 23 | August 18 | Seattle | W 83–79 | Allen; Laney (17) | Ionescu; Laney (7) | Betnijah Laney (8) | Barclays Center; 2,103 | 11–12 |
| 24 | August 20 | Seattle | L 83–99 | Sami Whitcomb (26) | Natasha Howard (13) | Sami Whitcomb (8) | Barclays Center; 3,889 | 11–13 |
| 25 | August 22 | Los Angeles | L 83–86 | Howard; Whitcomb (17) | Natasha Howard (11) | Betnijah Laney (9) | Barclays Center; N/A | 11–14 |
| 26 | August 25 | Phoenix | L 79–106 | Betnijah Laney (20) | Allen; Laney (8) | Sabrina Ionescu (7) | Barclays Center; 1,872 | 11–15 |
| 27 | August 27 | Phoenix | L 64–80 | Natasha Howard (18) | Sabrina Ionescu (10) | Sabrina Ionescu (9) | Barclays Center; 2,315 | 11–16 |
| 28 | August 31 | @ Minnesota | L 66–74 | Ionescu; Laney (17) | Michaela Onyenwere (10) | Sabrina Ionescu (6) | Target Center; 3,221 | 11–17 |

September : 1–3 (Home: 1–0; Road: 0–3)

| Game | Date | Team | Score | High points | High rebounds | High assists | Location Attendance | Record |
|---|---|---|---|---|---|---|---|---|
| 29 | September 2 | @ Seattle | L 75–85 | Sabrina Ionescu (20) | Betnijah Laney (7) | Sabrina Ionescu (7) | Angel of the Winds Arena; 3,592 | 11–18 |
| 30 | September 11 | @ Dallas | L 76–77 | Betnijah Laney (19) | Natasha Howard (11) | Ionescu; Laney (6) | College Park Center; 2,888 | 11–19 |
| 31 | September 15 | @ Connecticut | L 69–98 | Natasha Howard (25) | Natasha Howard (8) | Sabrina Ionescu (5) | Mohegan Sun Arena; 4,012 | 11–20 |
| 32 | September 17 | Washington | W 91–80 | Natasha Howard (24) | Natasha Howard (10) | Betnijah Laney (11) | Barclays Center; 3,615 | 12–20 |

2021 season schedule

=== Playoffs ===
2021 playoff game log
Total: 0–1
First round

| Game | Date | Team | Score | High points | High rebounds | High assists | Location Attendance | Series |
|---|---|---|---|---|---|---|---|---|
| 1 | September 23 | @ Phoenix | 82–83 | Betnijah Laney (25) | Natasha Howard (10) | Sabrina Ionescu (11) | Grand Canyon University Arena; 5,827 | 0–1 |

2021 playoff schedule

== Standings ==
| # | Team | W | L | PCT | GB | Conf. | Home | Road | Cup |
|---|---|---|---|---|---|---|---|---|---|
| 1 | x – Connecticut Sun | 26 | 6 | .813 | – | 12–3 | 15–1 | 11–5 | 9–1 |
| 2 | x – Las Vegas Aces | 24 | 8 | .750 | 2 | 11–4 | 13–3 | 11–5 | 6–4 |
| 3 | x – Minnesota Lynx | 22 | 10 | .688 | 4 | 10–5 | 13–3 | 9–7 | 7–3 |
| 4 | x – Seattle Storm | 21 | 11 | .656 | 5 | 9–6 | 11–5 | 10–6 | 8–2 |
| 5 | x – Phoenix Mercury | 19 | 13 | .594 | 7 | 6–9 | 7–9 | 12–4 | 5–5 |
| 6 | x – Chicago Sky | 16 | 16 | .500 | 10 | 10–5 | 6–10 | 10–6 | 6–4 |
| 7 | x – Dallas Wings | 14 | 18 | .438 | 12 | 7–8 | 7–9 | 7–9 | 3–7 |
| 8 | x – New York Liberty | 12 | 20 | .375 | 14 | 6–9 | 7–9 | 5–11 | 5–5 |
| 9 | e – Washington Mystics | 12 | 20 | .375 | 14 | 7–8 | 8–8 | 4–12 | 4–6 |
| 10 | e – Los Angeles Sparks | 12 | 20 | .375 | 14 | 2–13 | 8–8 | 4–12 | 1–9 |
| 11 | e – Atlanta Dream | 8 | 24 | .250 | 18 | 6–9 | 4–12 | 4–12 | 4–6 |
| 12 | e – Indiana Fever | 6 | 26 | .188 | 20 | 4–11 | 4–12 | 2–14 | 2–8 |

Notes

(#) – League Standing
x – Clinched playoff berth
e – Eliminated from playoff contention
Source: Overall standings and Commissioner's Cup Standings

== Playoffs ==
**First round** single elimination Sept. 23
**5** | **Phoenix Mercury** | **83**
8 | New York Liberty | 82
**6** | **Chicago Sky** | **81**
7 | Dallas Wings | 64

**Second round** single elimination Sept. 26
4 | Seattle Storm | 80
**5** | **Phoenix Mercury** | **85**^{OT}
3 | Minnesota Lynx | 76
**6** | **Chicago Sky** | **89**

**Semifinals**; Best-of-5; Sept. 28 – Oct. 8
2 | Las Vegas Aces | 2
**5** | **Phoenix Mercury** | **3**
1 | Connecticut Sun | 1
**6** | **Chicago Sky** | **3**

**Finals**; Best-of-5; Oct. 10 – 17
5 | Phoenix Mercury | 1
**6** | **Chicago Sky** | **3**

Note: Teams re-seeded after each round.

- **Bold** – Game or series winner
- Italic – Team with home-court advantage

== Awards and honors ==
| Recipient | Award | Date awarded | Ref. |
|---|---|---|---|
| Sabrina Ionescu | Eastern Conference Player of the Week | May 24 | |
| Betnijah Laney | Eastern Conference Player of the Week | June 1 | |
| Michaela Onyenwere | WNBA Rookie of the Month - May | June 2 | |
| Walt Hopkins | WNBA Coach of the Month - May | June 2 | |
| Michaela Onyenwere | WNBA Rookie of the Month - June | July 1 | |
| Betnijah Laney | WNBA All-Star Selection | June 30 | |
| Michaela Onyenwere | WNBA Rookie of the Month - August | September 2 | |
| Natasha Howard | Eastern Conference Player of the Week | September 20 | |
| Michaela Onyenwere | WNBA Rookie of the Month - September | September 22 | |
| Michaela Onyenwere | WNBA Rookie of the Year | October 5 | |
| DiDi Richards | WNBA All-Rookie Team | October 5 | |
| Michaela Onyenwere | WNBA All-Rookie Team | October 5 | |

== Statistics ==
Legend
| GP | Games played | GS | Games started | MPG | Minutes per game | RPG | Rebounds per game |
| APG | Assists per game | SPG | Steals per game | BPG | Blocks per game | PPG | Points per game |
| FG% | Field-goal percentage | 3P% | 3-point field-goal percentage | FT% | Free-throw percentage | TO | Turnovers per game |
| PF | Fouls per game | | Team leader | | League leader |

=== Regular season ===
| Player | GP | GS | MPG | FG% | 3P% | FT% | RPG | APG | SPG | BPG | PPG |
|---|---|---|---|---|---|---|---|---|---|---|---|
| Betnijah Laney | 32 | 32 | 33.7 | 45.1 | 31.2 | 78.7 | 4.1 | 5.2 | 0.7 | 0.1 | 16.8 |
| Natasha Howard | 13 | 13 | 27.5 | 49.4 | 33.3 | 77.4 | 7.2 | 1.7 | 1.3 | 0.5 | 16.2 |
| Sami Whitcomb | 30 | 28 | 28.1 | 47.3 | 42.5 | 81.8 | 5.0 | 2.7 | 1.0 | 0.3 | 11.7 |
| Sabrina Ionescu | 30 | 26 | 30.0 | 37.9 | 32.5 | 91.1 | 5.7 | 6.1 | 0.6 | 0.5 | 11.7 |
| Rebecca Allen | 25 | 13 | 24.2 | 34.3 | 38.1 | 89.2 | 3.7 | 1.1 | 1.6 | 1.2 | 9.2 |
| Michaela Onyenwere | 32 | 29 | 22.5 | 39.9 | 32.7 | 83.6 | 2.9 | 0.6 | 0.4 | 0.3 | 8.6 |
| Reshanda Gray | 15 | 0 | 14.1 | 53.1 | 22.2 | 69.2 | 3.5 | 0.3 | 0.3 | 0.3 | 5.9 |
| Jazmine Jones | 27 | 0 | 16.6 | 35.6 | 38.3 | 76.1 | 2.4 | 1.1 | 0.5 | 0.4 | 5.9 |
| Kylee Shook | 30 | 19 | 18.9 | 46.7 | 39.3 | 80.0 | 4.0 | 1.4 | 0.3 | 0.5 | 5.7 |
| Leaonna Odom | 18 | 0 | 11.5 | 46.7 | 29.4 | 75.0 | 1.2 | 0.4 | 0.3 | 0.3 | 3.1 |
| DiDi Richards | 31 | 0 | 11.2 | 42.2 | 45.5 | 60.0 | 1.1 | 0.8 | 0.5 | 0.2 | 2.3 |
| Jocelyn Willoughby | 0 | 0 | 0.0 | 0.0 | 0.0 | 0.0 | 0.0 | 0.0 | 0.0 | 0.0 | 0.0 |
