= Rebecca Allen (basketball) =

Australian basketball player (born 1992)

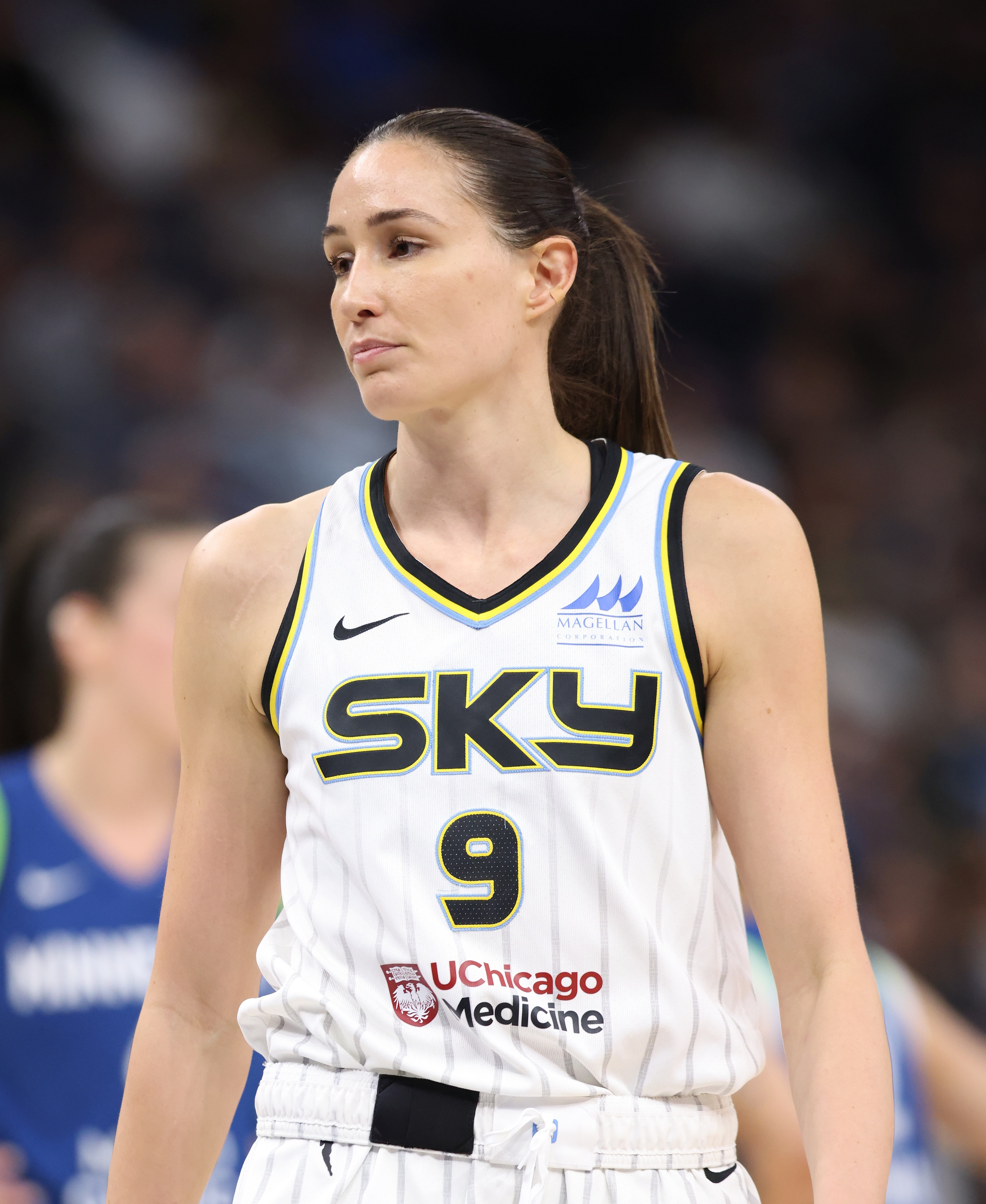
- Allen with the Chicago Sky in 2025

Personal information
- Born: 6 November 1992 (age 34) Wangaratta, Victoria, Australia
- Listed height: 6 ft 2 in (1.88 m)
- Listed weight: 162 lb (73 kg)

Career information
- High school: Carey Grammar (Victoria)
- Playing career: 2009–2026
- Position: Shooting guard / small forward
- Number: 9

Career history
- 2009–2010: Dandenong Rangers
- 2010–2012: Australian Institute of Sport
- 2012–2015: Melbourne Boomers
- 2015–2019: New York Liberty
- 2015–2016: South East Queensland Stars
- 2016–2017: Good Angels Košice
- 2017–2018: ASVEL Féminin
- 2018–2020: Arka Gdynia
- 2020–2023: Valencia Basket
- 2021–2022: New York Liberty
- 2023: Connecticut Sun
- 2024: Phoenix Mercury
- 2025: Chicago Sky
- 2025: Fenerbahçe
- 2026: Lunar Owls BC
- 2026: New York Liberty

Career highlights
- WNBA Commissioner's Cup Champion (2026); WNBL Defensive Player of the Year (2014); SEABL Grand Final MVP (2013); SEABL Youth Player of the Year (2011)
- Stats at WNBA.com
- Stats at Basketball Reference
Medals
Women's basketball
Representing Australia
FIBA World Cup
Silver medal – second place	2018 Spain
Bronze medal – third place	2014 Turkey
Bronze medal – third place	2022 Australia
FIBA Asia Cup
Bronze medal – third place	2019 Bangalore

Rebecca Kate Allen (born 6 November 1992) is an Australian former professional basketball player. She played in the Women's National Basketball Association (WNBA), Turkish Super League, and Unrivaled.

Allen was a member of the Australian women's basketball team (Opals) at the 2020 Tokyo Olympics. The Opals were eliminated after losing to the USA in the quarterfinals.

== Early life ==
Allen was born in Wangaratta, Victoria, and moved to Melbourne with her family when she was five years old. She is a dizygotic twin. She played in the junior competition for the suburb Nunawading. Allen was sought out by the Women's National Basketball League (WNBL) at the age of 16.

== Career ==
=== WNBL ===
In the domestic Women's National Basketball League (WNBL), Allen has played for the Dandenong Rangers (2009–2010), Australian Institute of Sport (2010–2012), Melbourne Boomers (2012–2015) and South East Queensland Stars (2015–2016). In 2014, Allen was awarded the WNBL Robyn Maher Defensive Player of the Year.

Alongside the WNBL, in Australia Allen played with the Knox Raiders for the 2013 SEABL Season where the team took home the Championship. Allen starred and was awarded the Barbara Barton (Grand Final MVP) medal. She was previously awarded the 2011 SEABL Youth Player of the Year.

=== WNBA ===
==== New York Liberty (2015–2022) ====
After her success at the World Championship, where she won a bronze medal, Allen signed as a free agent with the New York Liberty for the 2015 WNBA season. She made her WNBA debut in the Liberty's 2015 season opener against Atlanta, scoring six points. Shortly into the 2015 season, Allen suffered a season-ending right knee cartilage injury and decided to return home to Australia to undergo surgery.

==== Connecticut Sun (2023) ====
Allen was traded to the Connecticut Sun in January 2023, as part of a three-team deal.

==== Phoenix Mercury (2024) ====
On 3 February 2024, the Connecticut Sun traded Allen to the Phoenix Mercury in a sign-and-trade deal in exchange for Moriah Jefferson. Allen played in only 18 games all season. She struggled with injuries, and a hamstring injury sustained in July while preparing for the Paris Olympics tournament kept her sidelined for the rest of the regular season. She was officially ruled out of the postseason after undergoing surgery to address her lingering back issues.

==== Chicago Sky (2025–2026) ====
On 2 February 2025, Allen was traded to the Connecticut Sun. The deal was originally reported as Allen, Natasha Cloud, and the 12th pick in the 2025 WNBA draft being traded in exchange for Alyssa Thomas and Tyasha Harris; however, it was officially part of a larger four-team trade. Subsequently, on 4 February 2025, Allen was traded to the Chicago Sky in exchange for Lindsay Allen and the rights to Nikolina Milić.

=== Europe ===
In 2020, after the pandemic, she signed with the Spanish team, Valencia Basket.

In September 2025, Allen signed a short-term contract with Fenerbahçe of the Turkish Super League.

=== Unrivaled ===
On November 5, 2025, it was announced that Allen had been drafted by Lunar Owls BC for the 2026 Unrivaled season.

== National team ==
=== Youth Level ===
Allen made her debut for the Gems at the 2011 FIBA Under-19 World Championship for Women held in Chile.

=== Senior Level ===
Allen is a current member of the Australian Women's basketball squad. Following good form in preliminary lead-up games, Allen was selected to represent the Opals at the 2014 World Championship held in Turkey where she would make her national team debut.

In 2019, Allen was named to the final roster for the 2019 FIBA Asia Cup. After strong showings throughout this tournament, Allen was named to the tournament All-Star Five.

Allen, like all the other members of the 2020 Tokyo Olympics Opals women's basketball team, had a difficult tournament. The Opals lost their first two group stage matches. They looked flat against Belgium and then lost to China in heartbreaking circumstances. In their last group match the Opals needed to beat Puerto Rico by 25 or more in their final match to progress. This they did by 27 in a very exciting match. However, they lost to the United States in their quarterfinal 79 to 55.

Allen was in the squad for the 2024 Paris Olympics tournament. However, a hamstring injury sustained in the final warm-up game ruled her out of the tournament.

== Personal life ==
Allen completed a Masters in Marketing at Deakin University.

Allen joined the NBL commentary team for the 2024–25 season.

== Career statistics ==
Legend
GP	Games played	GS	Games started	MPG	Minutes per game	RPG	Rebounds per game
APG	Assists per game	SPG	Steals per game	BPG	Blocks per game	PPG	Points per game
TO	Turnovers per game	FG%	Field-goal percentage	3P%	3-point field-goal percentage	FT%	Free-throw percentage
**Bold**	Career best	°	League leader

=== WNBA ===
==== Regular season ====
WNBA regular season statistics
Year	Team	GP	GS	MPG	FG%	3P%	FT%	RPG	APG	SPG	BPG	TO	PPG
2015	New York	2	0	17.0	.300	.000	—	**4.5**	.0	1.5	1.0	1.5	3.0
2016	New York	21	6	13.3	**.459**	**.567**	.867	1.7	.5	.4	.5	.6	5.7
2017	New York	33	0	9.2	.376	.341	.333	2.0	.5	.3	.3	**.5**	2.8
2018	New York	28	0	10.4	.376	.263	.840	1.7	.3	.3	.3	**.5**	3.8
2019	New York	24	2	17.2	.417	.426	.813	2.5	.7	.5	.7	.7	7.2
2020	Did not play (opted out)												
2021	New York	25	13	24.6	.343	.381	**.892**	3.7	1.1	**1.6**	1.2	.8	**9.2**
2022	New York	25	19	20.9	.379	.313	.833	3.4	1.2	.8	1.0	1.0	7.0
2023	Connecticut	40	**27**	21.5	.408	.348	.704	2.8	.9	.9	**1.3**	.9	6.4
2024	Phoenix	18	18	**24.8**	.417	.352	.667	3.9	1.1	.9	.7	1.0	7.4
2025	Chicago	**44**	17	18.7	.342	.318	.613	2.6	**1.3**	.5	.5	.9	5.1
2026	New York	29	12	18.1	.420	.406	.867	2.6	.6	.5	.4	.6	5.8
**Career**	11 years, 4 teams	289	114	17.7	.387	.361	.779	2.7	.8	.7	.7	.8	5.8

==== Playoffs ====
WNBA playoff statistics
Year	Team	GP	GS	MPG	FG%	3P%	FT%	RPG	APG	SPG	BPG	TO	PPG
2017	New York	1	0	6.7	**1.000**	**1.000**	—	.0	.0	.0	1.0	**.0**	3.0
2021	New York	1	1	29.0	.500	.600	—	4.0	.0	1.0	**3.0**°	**.0**	**11.0**
2022	New York	3	0	16.3	.286	.167	**1.000**	3.0	1.3	.7	.3	1.0	4.3
2023	Connecticut	**6**	**6**	**30.8**	.489	.423	**1.000**	**5.5**	**1.7**	**1.5**	1.5	1.0	9.7
2024	Phoenix	Did not play (injury)											
2026	New York	4	0	5.8	.000	.000	—	.8	.0	.3	.3	.3	.0
**Career**	5 years, 2 teams	15	7	19.5	.432	.390	1.000	3.3	.9	.9	1.0	.7	5.7

== See also ==
- List of Australian WNBA players
