= 2023 WNBA playoffs =

Professional women's basketball tournament

- Dates: September 13 – October 18, 2023

Final positions
- Champions: Las Vegas Aces
- Runners-up: New York Liberty

Tournament statistics
- Scoring leader (s): A'ja Wilson (Las Vegas) (23.8 PPG)

Awards
- MVP: A'ja Wilson (Las Vegas)

The 2023 WNBA playoffs was the postseason tournament of the WNBA's 2023 season. The playoffs began on September 13, 2023, and culminated with the Las Vegas Aces successfully defending their WNBA title by defeating the New York Liberty three games to one in the finals.

== Overview ==
=== Updates to postseason appearances ===
- The Las Vegas Aces entered the postseason for the fifth consecutive season and also clinched the best record in the WNBA for the third time in the last four seasons.
- The New York Liberty entered the postseason for the third consecutive season.
- The Connecticut Sun entered the postseason for the seventh consecutive season, currently the longest streak in the WNBA.
- The Dallas Wings entered the postseason for the third consecutive season.
- The Minnesota Lynx entered the postseason for the first time since 2021.
- The Washington Mystics entered the postseason for the second consecutive season.
- The Atlanta Dream entered the postseason for the first time since 2018.
- The Chicago Sky entered the postseason for the fifth consecutive season.
- The Los Angeles Sparks missed the postseason for the third consecutive season.
- The Phoenix Mercury missed the postseason for the first time since 2012.
- The Seattle Storm missed the postseason for the first time since 2015.
- The Indiana Fever missed the postseason for the seventh consecutive season, currently the longest active postseason drought in the WNBA.

=== Notable occurrences ===
- For the first time since the WNBA switched playoff formats in 2016, the Eastern Conference had more teams qualify for the playoffs than the Western Conference.
- This season marked the first time since the 2021 season that the league's top scorer (Jewell Loyd) failed to reach the playoffs.
- By winning the WNBA title, the Las Vegas Aces were the first team since the Los Angeles Sparks in 2002 to win back-to-back titles.

== Format ==
The 2023 Playoffs continued to use the format that the WNBA Board of Governors approved prior to the 2022 season. In November 2021, the WNBA Board of Governors formalized a new playoff system that will structure the 2022 playoffs onward. The new playoff format scraps the single-elimination games of the first two rounds in favor of a best-of-3 quarterfinal round. As a result, all eight playoff teams, seeded according to overall regular season record regardless of conference (1 vs. 8, 2 vs. 7, 3 vs. 6, 4 vs. 5), will begin postseason play in the first round. Since 2016, seeds 3 and 4 received a bye to the second round (single game) and seeds 1 and 2 received a bye to the semifinals (best-of-5). In the first round series, the higher seeded team will host games 1 and 2, and the lower seeded team will host game 3 if necessary. In the semifinal round, no reseeding will take place, which means the winners of the 1 vs. 8 series will be paired with the winner of the 4 vs. 5 series as will the winners of the 2 vs. 7 and 3 vs. 6 series. The semifinal and final rounds will remain best-of-5 series in which the higher seeded team hosts games 1, 2 and (if necessary) 5 while the lower seeded team hosts games 3 and (if necessary) 4.

== Broadcast ==
All games were aired across the ESPN family of networks, which includes ESPN, ESPN2, and ABC in the US and on TSN, Sportsnet, and NBA TV Canada in Canada.

== Playoff qualifying ==
Seed	Team	Record	Clinched	
Seed	Team	Record	Playoff berth	Top Record
1	Las Vegas Aces	34–6	August 2	September 10
2	New York Liberty	32–8	August 11	No
3	Connecticut Sun	27–13	August 20	No
4	Dallas Wings	22–18	September 1	No
5	Atlanta Dream ^{[note 1]}	19–21	September 6	No
6	Minnesota Lynx ^{[note 1]}	19–21	September 3	No
7	Washington Mystics ^{[note 1]}	19–21	September 5	No
8	Chicago Sky	18–22	September 8	No

^{[note 1]} Atlanta earned the fifth seed by virtue of its combined record against Minnesota and Washington (5–2), while Minnesota came in second place in the three-way tiebreak and earned the sixth seed by virtue of their record (3-3) against Atlanta and Washington. By contrast, Washington's record against Atlanta and Minnesota put them at the seventh seed (2–5).

For the first time since eliminating conferences for the playoffs, the Eastern Conference qualified more teams than the Western Conference. Six of the eight playoff teams were the same as in 2022. The Atlanta Dream and Minnesota Lynx qualified this season, while the Seattle Storm and Phoenix Mercury did not.

== Bracket ==
**First round** Best-of-3
**1**	**Las Vegas Aces**	**2**
8	Chicago Sky	0
**4**	**Dallas Wings**	**2**
5	Atlanta Dream	0
**2**	**New York Liberty**	**2**
7	Washington Mystics	0
**3**	**Connecticut Sun**	**2**
6	Minnesota Lynx	1

**Semifinals**; Best-of-5
**1**	**Las Vegas Aces**	**3**
4	Dallas Wings	0
**2**	**New York Liberty**	**3**
3	Connecticut Sun	1

**Finals**; Best-of-5
1	**Las Vegas Aces**	**3**
2	New York Liberty	1

- **Bold** – Series winner
- Italic – Team with home-court advantage

== First round ==
=== (1) Las Vegas Aces vs. (8) Chicago Sky ===
The first seed Las Vegas Aces played the eighth seed Chicago Sky in the first playoff series. Las Vegas entered the series having won seven of their last ten games. Las Vegas secured the first seed on the last day of the season by virtue of defeating the Phoenix Mercury. The Chicago Sky entered the series having won six of their last ten games. Chicago secured the eighth and final playoff spot on the penultimate day of the season by defeating Minnesota. The teams played three times during the regular season, and Las Vegas won all three games.

==== Game 1 ====
The Aces got out to a hot start in game one and never looked back. The Aces won the first quarter 27–15 and followed up with a second quarter victory 26–21. At half time the Aces lead 53–36, and they built on that seventeen point lead in the third quarter, which they won 17–10. The Sky ended up winning the fourth quarter, but the score of 25–23 was not enough to overcome the twenty-four point defect they faced entering the fourth quarter. The Aces had five players score in double-digits and were led by Chelsea Gray with twenty points. Jackie Young scored eighteen points, Kelsey Plum added sixteen, A'ja Wilson scored fourteen, and Alysha Clark rounded out the double digit scorers with thirteen points. The Sky only had a single double-digit scorer in Kahleah Copper who had fifteen points.

ESPN, SN360

September 13
10:00 p.m. EST

Boxscore

**Las Vegas Aces** **87**, Chicago Sky 59
Scoring by quarter: **27**–15, **26**–21, **17**–10, **17**–13
Pts: Chelsea Gray (20); Rebs: Kiah Stokes (15); Asts: Chelsea Gray (7)	Pts: Kahleah Copper (15); Rebs: Courtney Williams (11); Asts: Courtney Williams (6)

T-Mobile Arena
Attendance: 12,927
Referees: Michael Price, Angelica Suffren, Tiara Cruse, Kevin Fahy

==== Game 2 ====
The Aces got out to a hot start in game one and never looked back. The Aces won the first quarter 23–14 and followed up with a second quarter victory 21–15. At half time the Aces lead 44–29, and they built on that fifteen point lead in the third quarter, which they won 25–16. The Sky ended up winning the fourth quarter, but the score of 25–23 was not enough to overcome the twenty-four point defect they faced entering the fourth quarter. The Aces won game two and the series. The Aces had four players score in double-digits and were led by A'ja Wilson with thirty-eight points. Jackie Young scored fifteen points, Alysha Clark scored fourteen points, and Kelsey Plum added ten points. A'ja Wilson also recorded sixteen rebounds to have a double-double in the game. The Sky were lead again by Kahleah Copper with twenty five points. She also recorded a double-double with ten rebounds. The Sky had two other double-digit scorers in Dana Evans with twenty-two points and Marina Mabrey with twelve points.

ABC, NBA TV Canada

September 17
3:00 p.m. EST

Boxscore

**Las Vegas Aces** **92**, Chicago Sky 70
Scoring by quarter: **23**–14, **21**–13, **25**–16, 23–**25**
Pts: A'ja Wilson (38); Rebs: A'ja Wilson (16); Asts: Chelsea Gray (9)	Pts: Kahleah Copper (25); Rebs: Kahleah Copper; Elizabeth Williams (10); Asts: Elizabeth Williams (5)

Michelob Ultra Arena
Attendance: 9,000
Referees: Eric Brewton, Jeff Wooten, Angel Kent, Marcy Williams

Regular-season series
Las Vegas won 3–0 in the regular-season series

June 11, 2023

Report

Chicago Sky 80, **Las Vegas Aces 93**

Michelob Ultra Arena

July 25, 2023

Report

**Las Vegas Aces 107**, Chicago Sky 95

Wintrust Arena

August 24, 2023

Report

**Las Vegas Aces 94**, Chicago Sky 87

Wintrust Arena

=== (2) New York Liberty vs. (7) Washington Mystics ===
The second seed New York Liberty played the seventh seed Washington Mystics in the second playoff series. New York secured its playoff berth on August 11 with a victory over the Chicago Sky. Washington entered the series having won five of its last ten games. They secured a playoff berth with two games remaining in the season by defeating the Phoenix Mercury. The teams met four times during the regular season, with both teams winning two games. The regular season series included a final day of the regular season matchup, which Washington won 90–88.

==== Game 1 ====
The Mystics started game one strongly and won the first quarter 29–23. The Liberty's defense improved in the second quarter and they won the quarter 23–13 to take a four-point lead into halftime. The Liberty built on that lead, winning the third quarter 23–15. The fourth quarter went to the Liberty, 21–18, and the Liberty came away with a fifteen-point game one win. Four Liberty starters scored in double-digits and were led by Sabrina Ionescu with twenty-nine points. Jonquel Jones added twenty points, Betnijah Laney had nineteen points, and Breanna Stewart finished with ten points on 3–16 shooting. Jones also recorded a double-double by recording twelve rebounds. The Mystics also had four startes score in double digits and were led by Myisha Hines-Allen with twenty-one points. Brittney Sykes added sixteen points, Ariel Atkins scored fourteen, and Elena Delle Donne was the final double-digit scorer with eleven points.

ESPN2, NBA TV Canada

September 15
7:30 p.m. EST

Boxscore

**New York Liberty** **90**, Washington Mystics 75
Scoring by quarter: 23–**29**, **23**–13, **23**–15, **21**–18
Pts: Sabrina Ionescu (29); Rebs: Jonquel Jones (12); Asts: Courtney Vandersloot (6)	Pts: Myisha Hines-Allen (21); Rebs: Myisha Hines-Allen; Natasha Cloud (8); Asts: Natasha Cloud (8)

Barclays Center
Attendance: 8,789
Referees: Tim Greene, Randy Richardson, Blanca Burns, Marcy Williams

==== Game 2 ====
Game two of the series started out as a closer affair than game one, with the Liberty taking the first quarter 21–18. The Liberty expanded on their lead in the second quarter, winning 25–17 and took an eleven-point lead into halftime. The Mystics turned the tied in the third quarter, winning 21–13 and cutting the Liberty's lead to only three points. The Mytics went on to win the fourth quarter 20–17 and the game headed to overtime. The Liberty won the overtime frame 14–9 to win the game and the series. This was the Liberty's first playoff series win since 2015. The Liberty had four players score in double-digits and were led by Breanna Stewart with twenty-seven points. Betnijah Laney and Jonquel Jones both scored nineteen points, while game one leading scorer Sabrina Ionescu scored eleven points. Jones also recorded a double-double by recording fourteen rebounds. The Mystics had all five starters score in double-digits and were led by Natasha Cloud with thirty-three points. Brittney Sykes scored fourteen points, Ariel Atkins added thirteen points, Elena Delle Donne scored eleven, and Myisha Hines-Allen rounded out the double-digit scorers with ten points. Sykes also recorded a double-double by recording twelve rebounds.

ESPN, TSN4

September 19
7:00 p.m. EST

Boxscore

**New York Liberty** **90**, Washington Mystics 86 (OT)
Scoring by quarter: **21**–18, **25**–17, 13–**21**, 17–**20**, Overtime: **14**–9
Pts: Breanna Stewart (27); Rebs: Jonquel Jones (14); Asts: Courtney Vandersloot (10)	Pts: Natasha Cloud (33); Rebs: Brittney Sykes (12); Asts: Natasha Cloud (9)

Barclays Center
Attendance: 9,256
Referees: Roy Gulbeyan, Tiara Cruse, Jenna Reneau, Biniam Maru

Regular-season series
Tied 2–2 in the regular-season series

May 19, 2023

Report

New York Liberty 64, **Washington Mystics 80**

Entertainment and Sports Arena

June 25, 2023

Report

Washington Mystics 88, **New York Liberty 89**

Barclays Center

July 21, 2023

Report

**New York Liberty 96**, Washington Mystics 87

Entertainment and Sports Arena

September 10, 2023

Report

**Washington Mystics 90**, New York Liberty 88

Barclays Center

=== (3) Connecticut Sun vs. (6) Minnesota Lynx ===
The third seed Connecticut Sun played the sixth seed Minnesota Lynx in the third playoff series. The Connecticut Sun entered the series having won six of their last ten games. The Sun secured a playoff spot on August 20, with a victory over the Chicago Sky. The Minnesota Lynx entered the series having won four of their last ten games. The Lynx secured a playoff spot on September 3, with a victory over the Phoenix Mercury. The teams played four times during the regular season with Connecticut winning three of the games.

==== Game 1 ====
The first quarter of game one was a tightly contested affair and it ended with the Sun winning 18–16. The Sun continued on to win the second quarter 28–16 and took a fourteen-point lead into halftime. They came out of the half and continued to build their lead, winning the third quarter 23–20. The Sun dominated the fourth quarter, winning 21–8 to win the game by thirty points. The Sun had five players score in double digits and were led by DeWanna Bonner with seventeen points. Rebecca Allen and Alyssa Thomas both scored fifteen points, Tiffany Hayes added fourteen points and Tyasha Harris added twelve points from the bench. Bonner and Thomas recorded double-doubles in the game; Bonner by virtue of fifteen rebounds, and Thomas via ten assists. The Lynx had two players score in double-digits with Kayla McBride having sixteen points and Napheesa Collier scoring fourteen.

ESPN2, TSN4/5

September 13
8:00 p.m. EST

Boxscore

**Connecticut Sun** **90**, Minnesota Lynx 60
Scoring by quarter: **18**–16, **28**–16, **23**–20, **21**–8
Pts: DeWanna Bonner (17); Rebs: DeWanna Bonner (15); Asts: Alyssa Thomas (10)	Pts: Kayla McBride (16); Rebs: Napheesa Collier; Dorka Juhász (6); Asts: Kayla McBride (3)

Mohegan Sun Arena
Attendance: 5,056
Referees: Roy Gulbeyan, Maj Forsberg, Fatou Cissoko-Stephens

==== Game 2 ====
The Minnesota Lynx prevailed in a tight first quarter, winning 24–21. They also won the second quarter 20–18 and took a five-point lead into halftime. The third quarter finished tied 21–21. Minnesota was able to hold off the Sun in a low scoring fourth quarter, winning 17–15. The Lynx won the game by seven points and were able to force a third game in Minnesota. The Lynx won despite only having two players score in double-digits. They were led by Kayla McBride who scored twenty-eight points and Napheesa Collier scored twenty-six points. Collier also recorded a double-double by adding thirteen rebounds. The Sun had three players score in double-digits and were led by Alyssa Thomas who scored twenty-six points. DeWanna Bonner scored twenty-four points, and Rebecca Allen added ten points.

ESPN, SN360

September 17
1:00 p.m. EST

Boxscore

Connecticut Sun 75, **Minnesota Lynx** **82**
Scoring by quarter: 21–**24**, 18–**20**, 21–21, 15–**17**
Pts: Alyssa Thomas (26); Rebs: Rebecca Allen (9); Asts: Alyssa Thomas (6)	Pts: Kayla McBride (28); Rebs: Napheesa Collier (13); Asts: Dorka Juhász (6)

Mohegan Sun Arena
Attendance: 6,673
Referees: Tim Greene, Isaac Barnett, Sha'Rae Mitchell

==== Game 3 ====
The Sun started out Game Three of the series on a high note, winning the first quarter 26–19. They continued that strong showing in the second quarter, winning 23–15 and taking a fifteen-point lead into halftime. The Sun scored significantly fewer points in the third quarter, but still won the quarter 16–15. The Lynx attempted to mount a comeback in the fourth quarter, winning 26–25, but their one-point quarter victory was far from enough to overcome the deficit. The Sun won in Minnesota by fifteen points to secure the series win and advance to the Second Round. The Sun had three players score in double-digits and were led by Alyssa Thomas who scored twenty-eight points. DeWanna Bonner scored twenty-five points and Tyasha Harris added eighteen points from the bench. Bonner and Thomas recorded double-doubles by virtue of recording ten rebounds and twelve assists, respectively. The Lynx also had three players in double-digits scoring and were led by Napheesa Collier with thirty-one points. Bridget Carleton scored thirteen points from the bench, and Kayla McBride scored ten.

ESPN, NBA TV Canada

September 20
8:00 p.m. EST

Minnesota Lynx 75, **Connecticut Sun** **90**
Scoring by quarter: 19–**26**, 15–**23**, 15–**16**, **26**–25
Pts: Napheesa Collier (31); Rebs: Kayla McBride (7); Asts: Tiffany Mitchell (5)	Pts: Alyssa Thomas (28); Rebs: DeWanna Bonner (10); Asts: Alyssa Thomas (12)

Target Center
Attendance: 8,724
Referees: Eric Brewton, Michael Price, Toni Patillo, Jeff Wooten

Regular-season series
Connecticut won 3–1 in the regular-season series

June 1, 2023

Report

**Connecticut Sun 89**, Minnesota Lynx 84

Target Center

June 22, 2023

Report

**Connecticut Sun 89**, Minnesota Lynx 68

Target Center

July 30, 2023

Report

**Minnesota Lynx 87**, Connecticut Sun 83

Mohegan Sun Arena

August 1, 2023

Report

Minnesota Lynx 69, **Connecticut Sun 79**

Mohegan Sun Arena

=== (4) Dallas Wings vs. (5) Atlanta Dream ===
The fourth seed Dallas Wings played the fifth seed Atlanta Dream in the fourth and final series of the first round. Dallas entered the series having won six of their last ten games. Dallas secured a playoff spot on September 1 with a victory over the Indiana Fever. Atlanta entered the series having won four of their last ten games. Atlanta secured a playoff spot on September 6 with a victory over the Seattle Storm. The teams played three times during the regular season, and Dallas won each meeting. The meetings included the opening day of the season for each team and the final day of the season.

==== Game 1 ====
The Atlanta Dream started Game One of the series at a blistering pace, winning the quarter 36–21. The tied turned in the second quarter with the Wings winning 28–13 to tie the game at 49 at halftime. The Dream won a close third quarter 21–18. However, they were unable to defend their four-point lead, and the Wings won the fourth quarter 27–12. The Wings had three players score in double-digits and were led by Satou Sabally with thirty-two points. Arike Ogunbowale scored twenty-four points and Teaira McCowan scored seventeen points. McCowan recorded a double-double by recording fourteen rebounds as well. The Dream had three players score double-digits and were led by Rhyne Howard with thirty-six points. Allisha Gray scored twenty-one points and Cheyenne Parker scored eleven points.

ESPN2, NBA TV Canada

September 15
9:30 p.m. EST

Boxscore

**Dallas Wings** **94**, Atlanta Dream 82
Scoring by quarter: 21–**36**, **28**–13, 18–**21**, **27**–12
Pts: Satou Sabally (32); Rebs: Teaira McCowan (14); Asts: Arike Ogunbowale (7)	Pts: Rhyne Howard (36); Rebs: Monique Billings; Cheyenne Parker (8); Asts: Danielle Robinson; Cheyenne Parker (4)

College Park Center
Attendance: 5,053
Referees: Eric Brewton, Isaac Barnett, Tyler Ricks, Toni Patillo

==== Game 2 ====
The Dream started Game two strongly as well, and won the first quarter 24–23. However, just like in game one, the Wings dominated the second quarter to take a halftime lead. In Game two, the second quarter finished 29–10, and the Dream had an eighteen-point lead at the half. The third quarter was a closer affair, which the Wings won 18–16. The Wings scored a game high thirty-one points in the fourth quarter to win that quarter 31–24. The Wings won Game 2 by twenty-seven points to take the series 2–0. The Wings had a WNBA Playoff record seven players score double-digits and were led by Arike Ogunbowale who scored twenty points. Satou Sabally and Awak Kuier both scored thirteen points, Teaira McCowan and Kalani Brown scored twelve points, Crystal Dangerfield scored eleven points, and Natasha Howard rounded out the double-digit scorers with ten points. McCowan also recorded a double-double with her sixteen rebounds. The Dream had three players score in double-digits, and were led by Rhyne Howard who scored twenty-one points. Allisha Gray scored nineteen points, and Cheyenne Parker scored fifteen points. The playoff series win was the first for the Wings since the franchise relocated to Dallas.

ESPN, NBA TV Canada

September 19
9:00 p.m. EST

Boxscore

**Dallas Wings** **101**, Atlanta Dream 74
Scoring by quarter: 23–**24**, **29**–10, **18**–16, **31**–24
Pts: Arike Ogunbowale (20); Rebs: Teaira McCowan (16); Asts: Arike Ogunbowale (7)	Pts: Rhyne Howard (21); Rebs: Allisha Gray (7); Asts: Allisha Gray (6)

College Park Center
Attendance: 4,798
Referees: Maj Forsberg, Fatou Cissoko-Stephens, Randy Richardson, Kevin Fahy

Regular-season series
Dallas won 3–0 in the regular-season series

May 20, 2023

Report

Atlanta Dream 78, **Dallas Wings 85**

College Park Center

June 20, 2023

Report

Atlanta Dream 73, **Dallas Wings 85**

College Park Center

September 10, 2023

Report

**Dallas Wings 94**, Atlanta Dream 77

Gateway Center Arena

== Semifinals ==
=== (1) Las Vegas Aces vs. (4) Dallas Wings ===
The Aces and the Wings faced off in the first semifinal series of the playoffs. Both teams entered the series having swept their First Round matchups two games to zero. The first seed Aces won over the eighth seed Chicago Sky and the fourth seed Wings won over the fifth seed Atlanta Dream. The teams met four times during the regular season with the Aces winning three of the four games.

==== Game 1 ====
Game one of the series started with a tight affair as the Aces won the first quarter 20–19. The second quarter was a much higher scoring affair, with the Aces winning the quarter 29–26 and taking a four-point lead into halftime. However, coming out of halftime the Aces dominated the third quarter and won 26–12. The Wings attempted a comeback, winning the fourth quarter 26–24 but it was not enough to overcome the deficit and the Aces took game one by fifteen points. The Aces had four players score in double digits and were led by A'ja Wilson with thirty-four points. Kelsey Plum added twenty-five points, Jackie Young scored nineteen points, and Chelsea Gray scored thirteen points. Young also recorded a double-double by virtue of ten rebounds. Dallas had six players score in double figures and were led by Satou Sabally with sixteen points. Arike Ogunbowale scored twelve points, Natasha Howard scored eleven points, and Crystal Dangerfield, Odyssey Sims, and Kalani Brown all scored ten points.

ESPN2, SN360

September 24
5:00 p.m. EST

Boxscore

**Las Vegas Aces** **97**, Dallas Wings 83
Scoring by quarter: **20**–19, **29**–26, **26**–12, 22–**26**
Pts: A'ja Wilson (34); Rebs: Jackie Young (10); Asts: Jackie Young (7)	Pts: Satou Sabally (16); Rebs: Teaira McCowan (8); Asts: Satou Sabally (7)

Michelob Ultra Arena
Attendance: 9,784
Referees: Eric Brewton, Tim Greene, Blanca Burns, Sha'Rae Mitchell

==== Game 2 ====
The Aces started game two of the series strongly, winning the first quarter 26–18 at home. However, the Wing's defense tightened in the second quarter, which allowed them to win the quarter 19–18. The Aces took a seven-point lead into halftime. The Aces came out of the half and won the third quarter 26–20 and took a thirteen-point lead into the forth quarter. Dallas attempted to mount a comeback and won the fourth quarter 27–21, but it was not enough to overcome the double digit deficit. The Aces won game two by seven points and took a 2–0 series lead into Dallas. The Aces had four players score in double-digits and were led by A'ja Wilson with thirty points. Chelsea Gray scored twenty-three points, Kelsey Plum scored eighteen, and Jackie Young added thirteen. Wilson also recorded a double-double with her eleven rebounds. The Wings also had four players score in double-digits and were led by Arike Ogunbowale with twenty-four points. Natasha Howard scored twenty points, Satou Sabally added thirteen, and Teaira McCowan rounded out the double-digit scorers with twelve. Howard and McCowan also recorded double-doubles by virtue of having ten rebounds each.

ESPN, TSN4

September 26
10:00 p.m. EST

Box Score

**Las Vegas Aces** **91**, Dallas Wings 84
Scoring by quarter: **26**–18, 18–**19**, **26**–20, 21–**27**
Pts: A'ja Wilson (30); Rebs: A'ja Wilson (11); Asts: Chelsea Gray (8)	Pts: Arike Ogunbowale (24); Rebs: Natasha Howard; Teaira McCowan (10); Asts: Odyssey Sims (5)

Michelob Ultra Arena
Attendance: 9,286
Referees: Isaac Barnett, Toni Patillo, Randy Richardson, Blanca Burns

==== Game 3 ====
The Wings started a must-win game three with a tight quarter, where they came out on top 18–16. The game stayed close in the second quarter, and again the Wings prevailed 18–15. The Wings headed into halftime with a five-point lead. However, the Aces turned things around and won the third quarter 18–15 and headed into the fourth quarter two points behind. The Aces were able to close the game out in the low scoring fourth quarter winning 15–10. With the game three win the Aces swept the semifinal series 3–0 and advanced to the Finals. The Aces had four players score in double figures and were led by Chelsea Gray with fifteen points. A'ja Wilson scored thirteen points, and Jackie Young and Kelsey Plum both scored eleven points. Wilson also had a double-double with thirteen rebounds. The Wings had three players score in double figures and were led by Arike Ogunbowale with eighteen points. Natasha Howard scored fourteen points and Teaira McCowan added ten points. McCowan also had a double-double with fifteen rebounds.

ESPN2, NBA TV Canada

September 29
9:30 p.m. EST

Box Score

Dallas Wings 61, **Las Vegas Aces** **64**
Scoring by quarter: **18**–16, **18**–15, 15–**18**, 10–**15**
Pts: Arike Ogunbowale (18); Rebs: Teaira McCowan (15); Asts: Veronica Burton (6)	Pts: Chelsea Gray (15); Rebs: A'ja Wilson (13); Asts: Kelsey Plum (7)

College Park Center
Attendance: 6,251
Referees: Roy Gulbeyan, Maj Forsberg, Fatou Cissoko-Stpehens, Jenna Reneau

Regular-season series
Las Vegas won 3–1 in the regular-season series

July 5, 2023

Report

Dallas Wings 82, **Las Vegas Aces 89**

Michelob Ultra Arena

July 7, 2023

Report

Las Vegas Aces 78, **Dallas Wings 80**

College Park Center

July 30, 2023

Report

Dallas Wings 91, **Las Vegas Aces 104**

Michelob Ultra Arena

August 8, 2023

Report

**Las Vegas Aces 104**, Dallas Wings 84

College Park Center

=== (2) New York Liberty vs. (3) Connecticut Sun ===
The Liberty and the Suns faced off in the second semifinal series of the playoffs. New York entered the series having swept their first round series two games to zero, while Connecticut entered having won their first round series two games to one. The second seed Liberty won over the seventh seed Washington Mystics and the third seed Sun won over the sixth seed Minnesota Lynx. The teams met four times during the regular season with the Liberty winning all four games.

==== Game 1 ====
Game one started with the Sun winning the first quarter 25–21 in New York. However, the Liberty came back and won the second quarter 19–12 to take a two-point lead into halftime. However the Sun game out of halftime and dominated the third quarter, winning 28–15. Their strong play continued into the fourth quarter, which was low scoring, and the Sun won 13–8. The Liberty only scored twenty-three points in the second half to lose the game by fifteen points. The Sun had four players score in double digits and were led by DeWanna Bonner with twenty points. Rebecca Allen scored eighteen points, and Tiffany Hayes and Natisha Hiedeman both scored twelve points. The Liberty had three players score in double figures and were led by Breanna Stewart with nineteen points. Jonquel Jones scored fourteen points and Sabrina Ionescu added twelve. Jones also scored a double-double by adding eleven rebounds.

ESPN, NBA TV Canada

September 24
1:00 p.m. EST

Boxscore

New York Liberty 63, **Connecticut Sun** **78**
Scoring by quarter: 21–**25**, **19**–12, 15–**28**, 8–**13**
Pts: Breanna Stewart (19); Rebs: Jonquel Jones (11); Asts: Courtney Vandersloot (7)	Pts: DeWanna Bonner (20); Rebs: Rebecca Allen; DeWanna Bonner; Alyssa Thomas; Tiffany Hayes (7); Asts: Alyssa Thomas (10)

Barclays Center
Attendance: 9,442
Referees: Roy Gulbeyan, Michael Price, Angel Kent

==== Game 2 ====
Connecticut started game two on the road with a six-point victory in the first quarter, winning 22–16. The Liberty cut into the lead, winning the second quarter 22–20, but the Sun took a four-point lead into halftime. The Liberty came out of halftime and only allowed 15 points the third quarter, winning 21–15, and took a two-point lead into the final frame. They continued their winning ways in the fourth, winning the quarter 25–20. The Liberty won game two by seven points, and the series heads to Connecticut tied at one game a piece. The Liberty had five players score in double-digits and were led by Sabrina Ionescu with twenty-one points. Betnijah Laney scored twenty points, Courtney Vandersloot scored nineteen points, and Breanna Stewart and Jonquel Jones both scored eleven. Only Stefanie Dolson also scored for the Liberty, and she contributed just two points. Stewart and Jones both recorded double-dobules in the game by having eleven and thirteen rebounds respectively. The Sun had three players score in double-digits and were led by Tiffany Hayes with thirty points. DeWanna Bonner scored nineteen points, and Alyssa Thomas scored ten points.

ESPN, NBA TV Canada

September 26
8:00 p.m. EST

Box Score

**New York Liberty** **84**, Connecticut Sun 77
Scoring by quarter: 16–**22**, **22**–20, **21**–15, **25**–20
Pts: Sabrina Ionescu (21); Rebs: Jonquel Jones (13); Asts: Sabrina Ionescu; Breanna Stewart (5)	Pts: Tiffany Hayes (30); Rebs: Alyssa Thomas (8); Asts: Alyssa Thomas (9)

Barclays Center
Attendance: 10,009
Referees: Maj Forsberg, Jeff Wooten, Fatou Cissoko-Stephens

==== Game 3 ====
As the series moved to Connecticut, the Liberty began game three with a bang on the road. They won the first quarter 37–16 to put the Sun in a hole early. The Sun didn't give up and won the second quarter 24–17, but still faced a fourteen-point deficit heading into halftime. The Sun continued to chip away at the lead, winning the third quarter 21–18 and cutting the lead to eleven going into the final quarter. The final frame finished tied at 20, and the Liberty won game three by eleven points. The Liberty had all five starter score in double figures and were led by Breanna Stewart with twenty-five points. Betnijah Laney scored twenty points, Sabrina Ionescu scored sixteen, Courtney Vandersloot added twelve, and Jonquel Jones had ten points. Stewart and Jones recorded double-doubles by having eleven and twelve rebounds, respectively. The Sun also had five players score in double figures and were led by Alyssa Thomas with twenty-three points. Tiffany Hayes scored sixteen points, Olivia Nelson-Ododa scored fourteen, Tyasha Harris added eleven off the bench, and DeWanna Bonner rounded out the double digit scorers with ten. Thomas recorded a double-double as she had fourteen assists. The Sun head into game four needing a win to keep the series alive.

ESPN2, NBA TV Canada

September 29
7:30 p.m. EST

Box Score

Connecticut Sun 81, **New York Liberty** **92**
Scoring by quarter: 16–**37**, **24**–17, **21**–18, 20–20
Pts: Alyssa Thomas (23); Rebs: Alyssa Thomas (9); Asts: Alyssa Thomas (14)	Pts: Breanna Stewart (25); Rebs: Jonquel Jones (12); Asts: Courtney Vandersloot (7)

Mohegan Sun Arena
Attendance: 9,162
Referees: Eric Brewton, Isaac Barnett, Toni Patillo

==== Game 4 ====
The Sun started a must-win game four strongly, at home, with a 23–19 first quarter victory. However, their lead fell away during the second quarter and the Liberty took the quarter 26–21, to take a one-point lead into halftime. The Liberty came out of the locker room playing lock-down defense, holding the Sun to just 14 points in the third quarter and they won the quarter 21–14. Leading by eight points going into the final quarter, the Liberty faced a comeback by the Sun. The Sun won the fourth quarter 26–21, but that was not enough to overcome the deficit, and the Liberty won game four by three points. With the victory, the Liberty took the series 3–1 and advanced to the WNBA Finals. The Liberty had three players score in double-digits and were led by Breanna Stewart with twenty-seven points. Jonquel Jones scored twenty-five points, and Betnijah Laney scored twenty-one points. Jones also recorded her fourth double-double of the series with fifteen rebounds. The Sun had a more balanced attack with five players scoring in double figures, and were led by Alyssa Thomas with seventeen points. Tiffany Hayes scored fifteen points, DiJonai Carrington scored fourteen, DeWanna Bonner scored twelve, and Tyasha Harris scored ten points. Alyssa Thomas scored the first triple double of the playoffs, and her seventh of the season with fifteen rebounds and eleven assists.

ABC, NBA TV Canada

October 1
3:00 p.m. EST

Box Score

Connecticut Sun 84, **New York Liberty** **87**
Scoring by quarter: **23**–19, 21–**26**, **21**–14, 21–**26**
Pts: Alyssa Thomas (17); Rebs: Alyssa Thomas (15); Asts: Alyssa Thomas (11)	Pts: Breanna Stewart (27); Rebs: Jonquel Jones (15); Asts: Sabrina Ionescu; Courtney Vandersloot (7)

Mohegan Sun Arena
Attendance: 8,196
Referees: Maj Forsberg, Tim Greene, Randy Richardson

Regular-season series
New York won 4–0 in the regular-season series

May 27, 2023

Report

Connecticut Sun 65, **New York Liberty 81**

Barclays Center

June 27, 2023

Report

**New York Liberty 89**, Connecticut Sun 81

Mohegan Sun Arena

August 24, 2023

Report

**New York Liberty 95**, Connecticut Sun 90 (OT)

Mohegan Sun Arena

September 1, 2023

Report

Connecticut Sun 58, **New York Liberty 89**

Barclays Center

== WNBA Finals ==
=== (1) Las Vegas Aces vs. (2) New York Liberty ===
==== Game 1 ====
ABC, SN1

October 8
3:00 p.m. EST

Box Score

**Las Vegas Aces** **99**, New York Liberty 82
Scoring by quarter: 22–**25**, 24–24, **26**–16, **27**–17
Pts: Kelsey Plum; Jackie Young (26); Rebs: A'ja Wilson (8); Asts: Chelsea Gray (9)	Pts: Breanna Stewart (21); Rebs: Jonquel Jones (10); Asts: Courtney Vandersloot (6)

Michelob Ultra Arena
Attendance: 10,300
Referees: Roy Gulbeyan, Tim Green, Fatou Cissoko-Stephens

==== Game 2 ====
ESPN, TSN1/4/5

October 11
9:00 p.m. EST

Box Score

**Las Vegas Aces** **104**, New York Liberty 76
Scoring by quarter: **38**–19, 14–**25**, **28**–13, **24**–19
Pts: A'ja Wilson (26); Rebs: A'ja Wilson (15); Asts: Chelsea Gray (11)	Pts: Jonquel Jones (22); Rebs: Breanna Stewart (13); Asts: Betnijah Laney (5)

Michelob Ultra Arena
Attendance: 10,232
Referees: Michael Price, Eric Brewton, Tiara Cruse

==== Game 3 ====
ABC, SN1

October 15
3:00 p.m. EST

Box Score

**New York Liberty** **87**, Las Vegas Aces 73
Scoring by quarter: **21**–18, 22–22, **18**–10, **26**–23
Pts: Jonquel Jones (27); Rebs: Breanna Stewart (12); Asts: Sabrina Ionescu (11)	Pts: Kelsey Plum (29); Rebs: A'ja Wilson (11); Asts: Jackie Young (5)

Barclays Center
Attendance: 17,143
Referees: Maj Forsberg, Isaac Barnett, Randy Richardson

==== Game 4 ====
ESPN, TSN1/3/4/5

October 18
8:00 p.m. EST

Box Score

New York Liberty 69, **Las Vegas Aces** **70**
Scoring by quarter: **23**–13, 16–**17**, 12–**23**, **18**–17
Pts: Courtney Vandersloot (19); Rebs: Breanna Stewart (14); Asts: Courtney Vandersloot (6)	Pts: A'ja Wilson (24); Rebs: A'ja Wilson (16); Asts: Jackie Young (7)

Barclays Center
Attendance: 16,851
Referees: Michael Price, Eric Brewton, Tiara Cruse

Regular-season series
Tied 2–2 in the regular-season series

June 29, 2023

Report

New York Liberty 81, **Las Vegas Aces 98**

Michelob Ultra Arena

August 6, 2023

Report

Las Vegas Aces 61, **New York Liberty 99**

Barclays Center

August 17, 2023

Report

New York Liberty 75, **Las Vegas Aces 88**

Michelob Ultra Arena

August 28, 2023

Report

Las Vegas Aces 85, **New York Liberty 94**

Barclays Center
