= DiDi Richards =

American basketball player (born 1999)

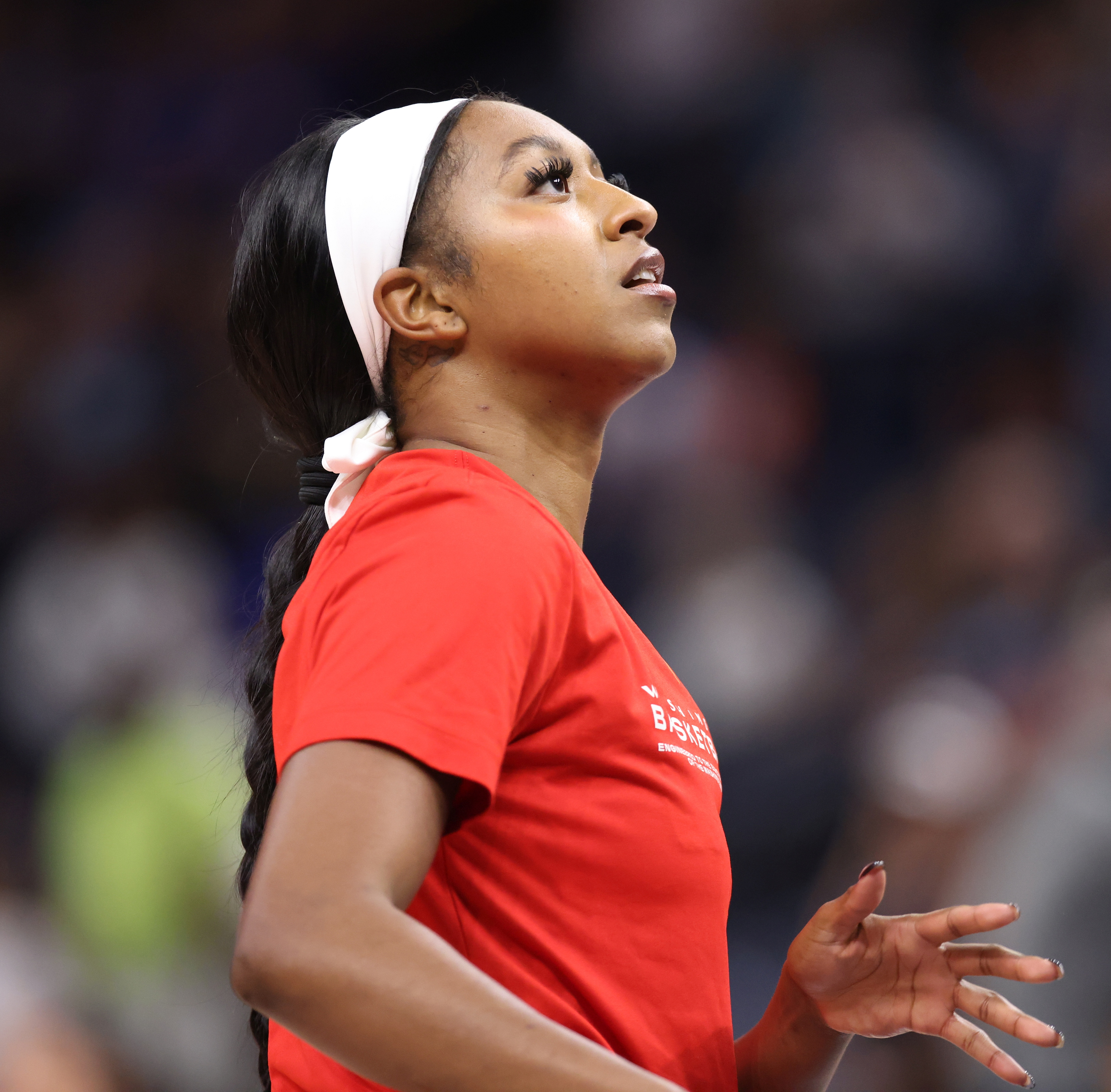
- Richards with the Washington Mystics in 2024

Personal information
- Born: February 8, 1999 (age 27) Houston, Texas, U.S.
- Listed height: 6 ft 2 in (1.88 m)
- Listed weight: 164 lb (74 kg)

Career information
- High school: Cypress Ranch (Cypress, Texas)
- College: Baylor (2017–2021)
- WNBA draft: 2021: 2nd round, 17th overall pick
- Drafted by: New York Liberty
- Playing career: 2021–present
- Position: Shooting guard

Career history
- 2021–2022: New York Liberty
- 2023–2024: Sydney Flames
- 2024: Washington Mystics

Career highlights
- NCAA champion (2019); WNBA All-Rookie Team (2021); Naismith Defensive Player of the Year (2020); WBCA Defensive Player of the Year (2020); Big 12 Defensive Player of the Year (2020); 3× Big 12 All-Defensive Team (2019–2021); McDonald's All-American (2017)
- Stats at Basketball Reference

Deauzya "DiDi" Richards (born February 8, 1999) is an American basketball player who most recently played for the Washington Mystics of the Women's National Basketball Association (WNBA), and for the Sydney Flames of the Women's National Basketball League (WNBL). She played college for the Baylor Lady Bears. Following the 2019–20 season, Richards was named WBCA Defensive Player of the Year and Naismith Defensive Player of the Year Award as well as Big 12 Defensive Player of the Year. She averaged 8.2 points and 4.9 rebounds per game, and had 52 steals and 25 blocked shots.

== College career ==
Richards had a breakout season as a sophomore, starting in all 38 games and helping the Lady Bears to a national championship. Known for her strong defensive skills, she was selected to the Big 12 All-Defensive Team and was named Defensive Player of the Year.

Richards' reputation as one of the nation's top on-ball defenders headed into her junior season was solidified when she swept National Defensive Player of the Year Awards from both Naismith and the WBCA, as she was named as the Big 12 Defensive Player of the Year. Richards ranked 14th and 13th in the NCAA, respectively, in assists (171) and assists per game (5.7) while leading the Big 12 in both categories. Her 171 assists in the COVID-19-shortened season still ranked as the sixth-best total among Baylor juniors all-time. Richards played and started in all 30 games for Baylor, averaging a team-best 29.9 minutes per contest.

== Career statistics ==
Legend
GP	Games played	GS	Games started	MPG	Minutes per game	RPG	Rebounds per game
APG	Assists per game	SPG	Steals per game	BPG	Blocks per game	PPG	Points per game
TO	Turnovers per game	FG%	Field-goal percentage	3P%	3-point field-goal percentage	FT%	Free-throw percentage
**Bold**	Career best	°	League leader

*	Denotes season(s) in which Richards won an NCAA Championship

=== WNBA ===
==== Regular season ====
Stats current through end of 2024 season

WNBA regular season statistics
Year	Team	GP	GS	MPG	FG%	3P%	FT%	RPG	APG	SPG	BPG	TO	PPG
2021	New York	**31**	0	**11.2**	**.422**	**.455**	.600	1.1	0.8	**0.5**	0.2	0.5	2.3
2022	New York	14	0	11.1	.306	.273	**.700**	**1.7**	**1.4**	0.1	**0.4**	0.9	2.3
2024	Washington	19	**7**	10.4	.408	.000	.429	1.5	0.7	0.1	0.2	**0.4**	**2.4**
**Career**	3 years, 2 teams	64	7	10.9	.389	.351	.559	1.4	0.9	0.3	0.2	0.6	2.3

==== Playoffs ====
WNBA playoff statistics
Year	Team	GP	GS	MPG	FG%	3P%	FT%	RPG	APG	SPG	BPG	TO	PPG
2021	New York	1	0	**12.0**	**1.000**	**1.000**	—	1.0	0.0	0.0	0.0	0.0	**5.0**
2022	New York	**2**	0	8.5	.400	.000	**1.000**	**1.5**	**1.0**	**1.0**	0.0	2.0	4.0
**Career**	2 years, 1 team	3	0	9.7	.571	.333	1.000	1.3	0.7	0.7	0.0	1.3	4.3

=== College ===
NCAA statistics
Year	Team	GP	GS	MPG	FG%	3P%	FT%	RPG	APG	SPG	BPG	TO	PPG
2017–18	Baylor	33	1	18.0	.471	.000	.510	4.3	1.6	0.8	0.6	**1.2**	5.1
2018–19*	Baylor	**38**	**38**	26.9	**.522**	—	.567	3.7	4.1	1.4	0.4	1.6	**7.2**
2019–20	Baylor	30	30	**29.8**	.497	—	**.775**	**4.9**	5.7	**1.7**	**0.8**	1.9	8.2
2020–21	Baylor	30	29	**29.8**	.429	—	.656	3.3	**6.3**	1.2	0.7	2.5	6.3
**Career**		131	98	26.0	.483	.000	.642	4.0	4.3	1.3	0.6	1.8	6.7
