= Walt Hopkins =

American basketball coach

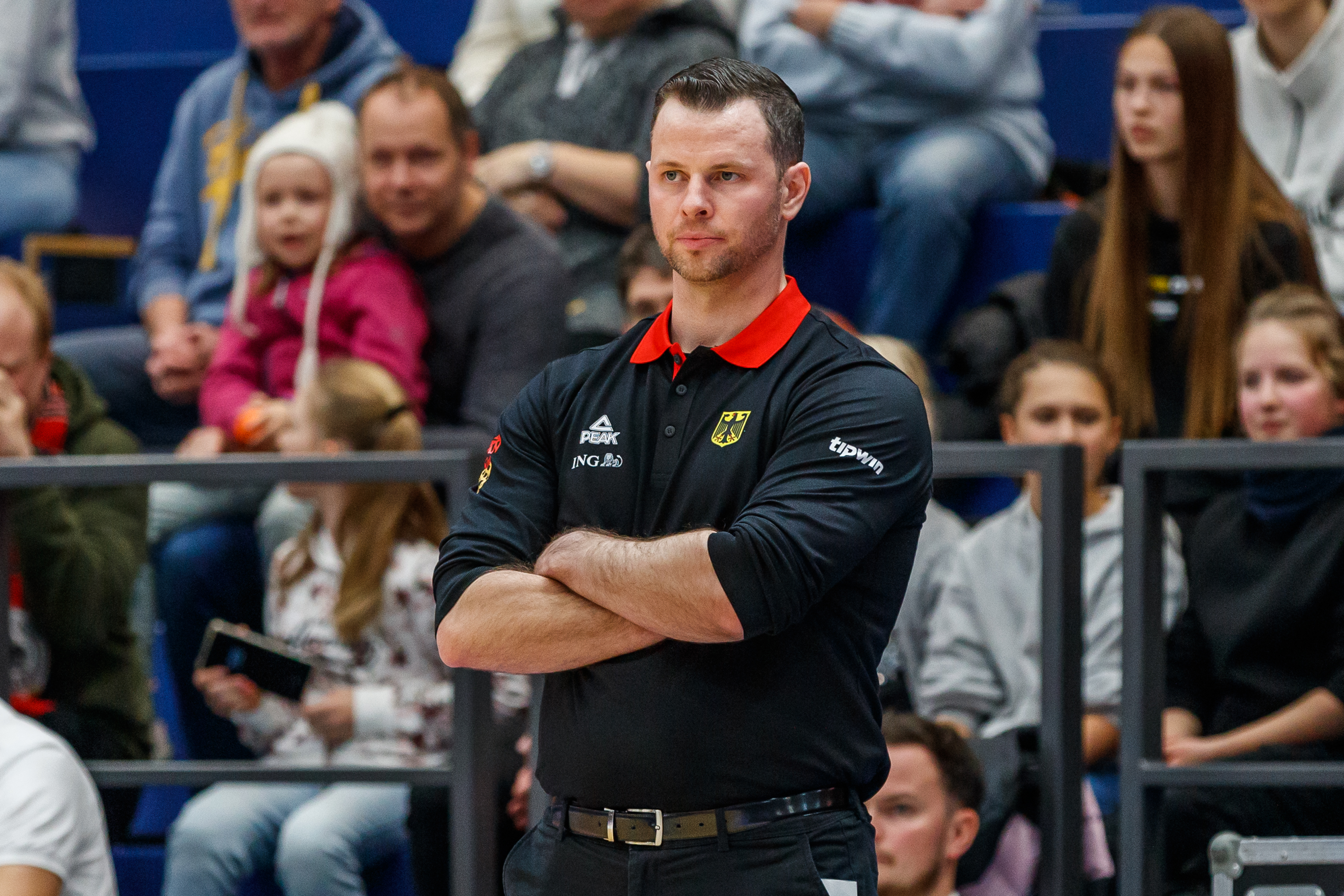
- 2022 as national coach in Germany

Personal information
- Born: July 30, 1985 (age 41)

Career information
- High school: Edward C. Reed (Sparks, Nevada)
- College: University of Nevada; Harvard University; University of California, Berkeley

Career history

Coaching
- 2017–2019: Minnesota Lynx (assistant)
- 2020–2021: New York Liberty

Career highlights
- As assistant coach: WNBA champion (2017)

Walt Hopkins (born July 30, 1985) is an American former basketball head coach for the New York Liberty of the WNBA.

== Education and early career ==
Hopkins earned a B.A. in English writing from the University of Nevada. He then earned master's degrees from Harvard University and the University of California, Berkeley.

At Berkeley, he worked as an academic coach and tutor for the school's athletes. In 2013 he was a player development coach for the Tulsa Shock of the WNBA. He was an assistant women's basketball coach at Utah Valley University from 2013 to 2014. He joined the Minnesota Lynx as assistant coach in 2017, when the Lynx won the championship.

== Later career ==
In 2020 under new owner Joseph Tsai, Hopkins replaced Katie Smith as the Liberty's head coach. The team will play in Tsai's Barclays Center in Brooklyn. In September 2020, he was appointed as head coach of the German women's national team. On December 6, 2021, Hopkins was fired as head coach of the New York Liberty. In 2023, he guided the German national team to its first Eurobasket berth since twelve years. Afterwards he stepped down for personal reasons.

== Coaching record ==
Legend
Regular season	G	Games coached	W	Games won	L	Games lost	W–L %	Win–loss %
Playoffs	PG	Playoff games	PW	Playoff wins	PL	Playoff losses	PW–L %	Playoff win–loss %

Team	Year	G	W	L	W–L%	Finish	PG	PW	PL	PW–L%	Result
NYL	2020	22	2	20	.091	6th in East	0	0	0	–	Missed Playoffs
NYL	2021	32	12	20	.375	3rd in East	1	0	1	.000	Lost in First Round
Career		54	14	40	.259		1	0	1	.000	
