= Betnijah Laney-Hamilton =

American basketball player (born 1993)

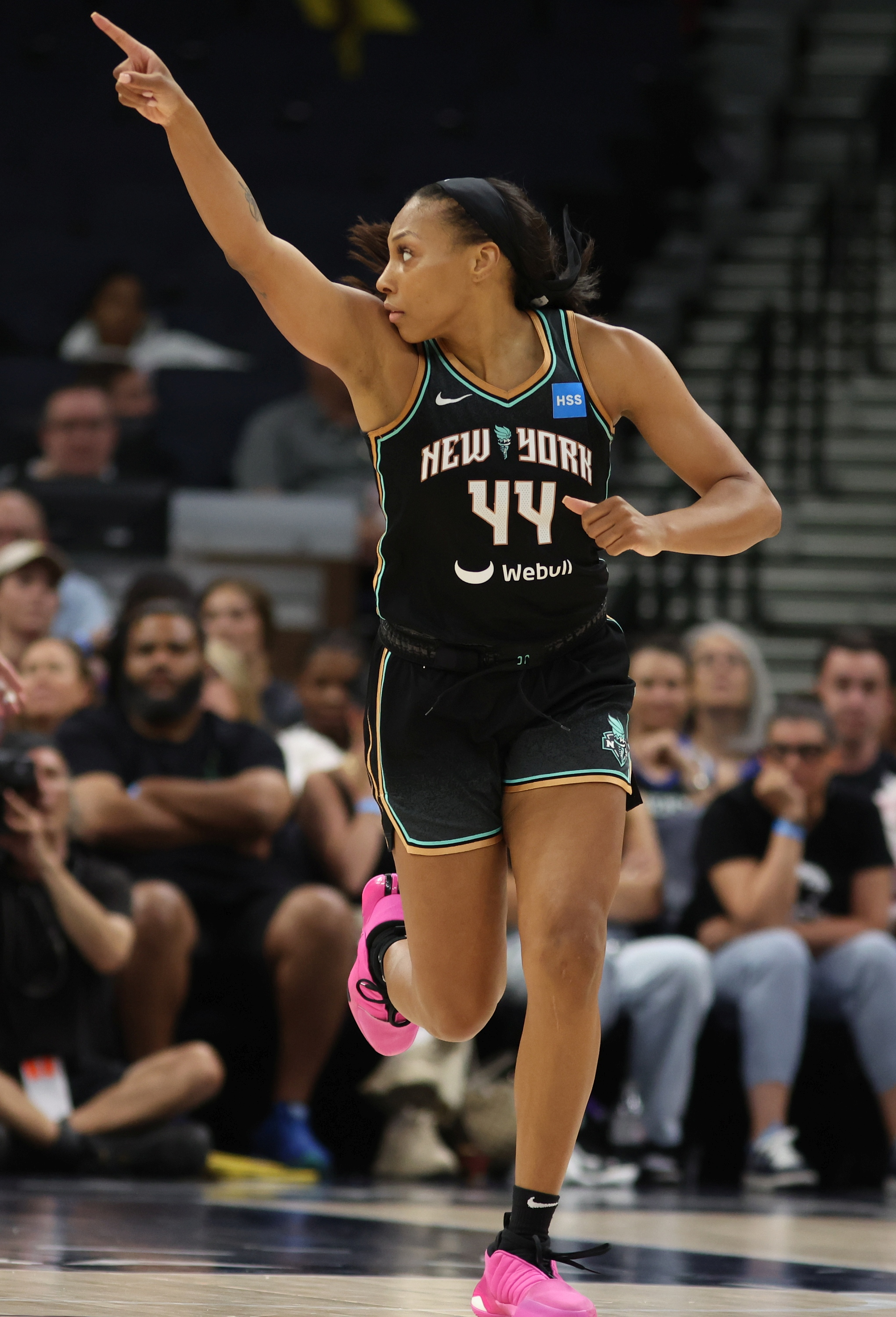
- Laney-Hamilton with the New York Liberty in 2023

No. 4 – Washington Mystics
- Position: Shooting guard / small forward
- League: WNBA

Personal information
- Born: October 29, 1993 (age 33) Philadelphia, Pennsylvania, U.S.
- Listed height: 6 ft 0 in (1.83 m)
- Listed weight: 166 lb (75 kg)

Career information
- High school: Smyrna (Smyrna, Delaware)
- College: Rutgers (2011–2015)
- WNBA draft: 2015: 2nd round, 17th overall pick
- Drafted by: Chicago Sky
- Playing career: 2015–present

Career history
- 2015–2016: Chicago Sky
- 2015–2016: Perth Lynx
- 2017–2018: Bendigo Spirit
- 2018: Connecticut Sun
- 2019: Indiana Fever
- 2019–2020: Elitzur Holon
- 2020: Atlanta Dream
- 2020–2021: Elitzur Ramla
- 2021–2026: New York Liberty
- 2025: Laces BC
- 2026–present: Washington Mystics

Career highlights
- WNBA champion (2024); WNBA Most Improved Player (2020); WNBA All-Star (2021); WNBA All-Defensive First Team (2020); WNBA All-Defensive Second Team (2023); 2× WNBA Commissioner's Cup Champion (2023, 2026); Dawn Staley Community Leadership Award (2022); First-team All-Big Ten (2015); Second-team All-AAC (2014); Big East All-Freshman Team (2012); McDonald's All-American (2011)
- Stats at WNBA.com
- Stats at Basketball Reference
Medals
Women's basketball
Representing United States
World Cup
Gold medal – first place	2022 Australia
FIBA Under-17 World Cup
Gold medal – first place	2010 France	Team
FIBA Americas U16 Championship
Gold medal – first place	2009 Mexico	Team

Betnijah Laney-Hamilton (born October 29, 1993) is an American professional basketball player for the Washington Mystics of the Women's National Basketball Association (WNBA). She played college basketball for Rutgers University.

== Early life and college ==
Laney-Hamilton started playing basketball at 10 years old, largely due to her mother having played basketball competitively. Laney-Hamilton is the daughter of Yolanda Laney, who played for Cheyney State and was also coached by C. Vivian Stringer. Her closest friends are Aiyannah Peal and Sydni Epps.

Laney-Hamilton attended Smyrna High School in Smyrna, Delaware where she averaged 23.7 points, 10 rebounds, 4.4 steals, 4.3 assists and 1.2 blocks per game as a senior and was named a McDonald's All-American.

In her four-year career at Rutgers, Laney-Hamilton played 129 games with 107 starts, and averaged 10.9 points, 7.1 rebounds, 2.2 assists and 1.2 steals per game.

== Professional career ==
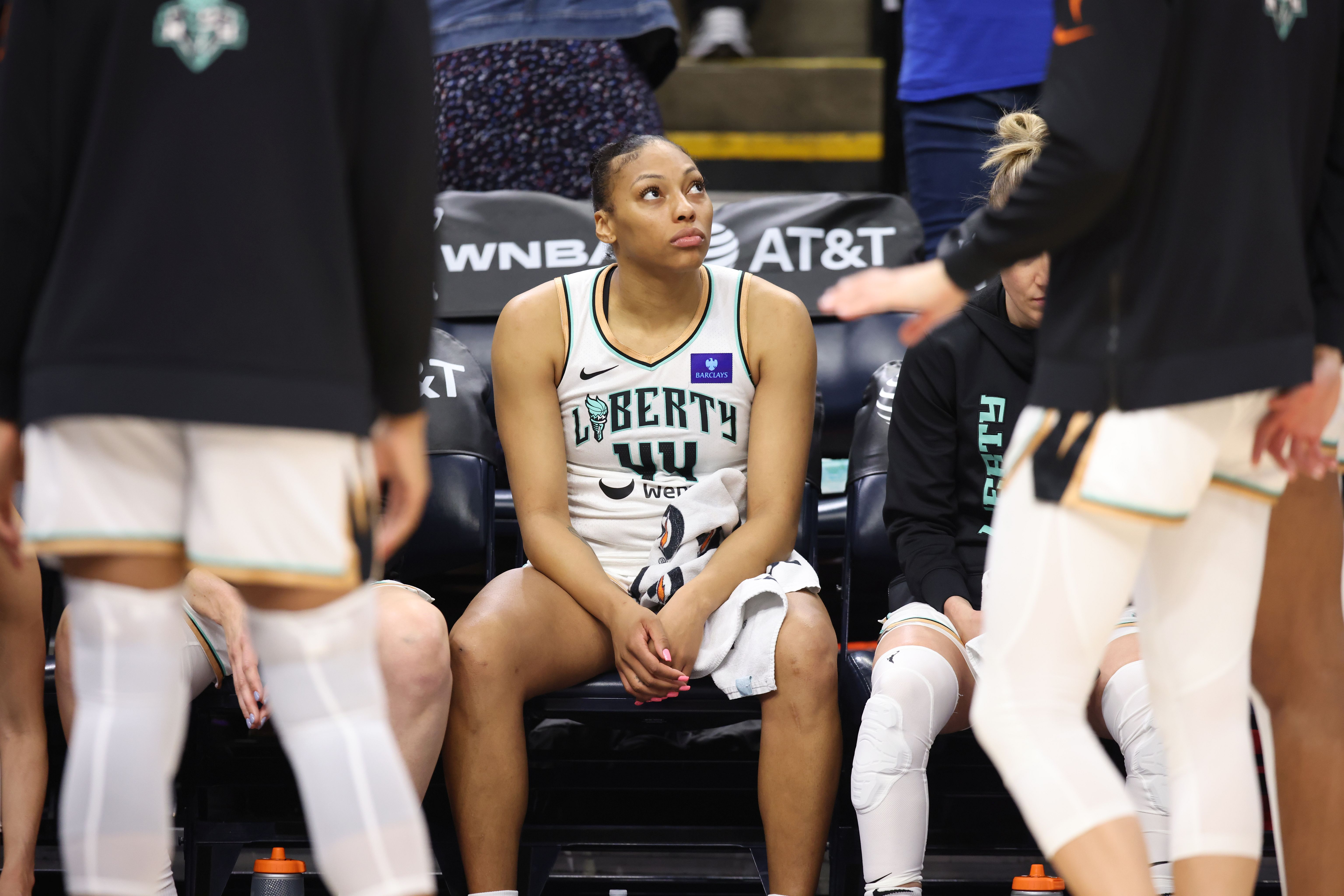
Laney-Hamilton with the New York Liberty in 2024

=== WNBA ===
==== Chicago Sky (2015–2016) ====
On April 16, 2015, Laney-Hamilton was selected by the Chicago Sky with the 17th overall pick in the 2015 WNBA draft. In her rookie season playing for the Sky, Laney-Hamilton averaged 2.8 points and 2.1 rebounds in 33 games (32 regular season and one playoff).

Laney-Hamilton returned to the Chicago Sky for the 2016 WNBA season. On June 8, she was ruled out for the rest of the season after tearing her left anterior cruciate ligament (ACL). The injury occurred during the second quarter of the Sky's June 3 game against the Washington Mystics.

==== Connecticut Sun (2018) ====
On February 7, 2018, Laney-Hamilton signed a training camp deal with the Connecticut Sun.

==== Indiana Fever (2019) ====
On February 5, 2019, Laney-Hamilton signed with the Indiana Fever. In Indiana, she reunited with her former college teammate from Rutgers Erica Wheeler. On February 14, 2020, she re-signed with the team on a multi-year contract, however, she was released by the Fever on June 17.

==== Atlanta Dream (2020) ====
Laney-Hamilton had a breakout season in 2020 with the Atlanta Dream; she was named to the WNBA All-Defensive Team and won the Most Improved Player Award.

==== New York Liberty (2021–2026) ====
In 2021 she signed with the New York Liberty. 2021 was a rebuilding year for the New York Liberty. in 2022, the Liberty were eliminated in the first round of the playoffs. In 2023, the New York Liberty placed second to the Las Vegas Aces. In 2024, Betnijah Laney-Hamilton was sidelined with injuries but proved pivotal to the New York Liberty's starting lineup, with a particularly stellar WNBA Finals Game 2 on the way to the New York Liberty's 2024 WNBA championship.

She missed the 2025 season due to a knee injury sustained during the offseason.

On August 6, 2026, Laney-Hamilton was waived by the Liberty.

==== Washington Mystics (2026–present) ====
On August 8, 2026, Laney-Hamilton was awarded to the Washington Mystics off waivers.

=== WNBL ===
On July 16, 2015, Laney-Hamilton signed with the Perth Lynx for the 2015–16 WNBL season. On November 11, 2015, she was named in the WNBL's Team of the Week for Round 5 after recording 12 points, 11 rebounds and 6 assists against the Adelaide Lightning on November 8. On January 13, 2016, she earned Team of the Week honors for a second time. On February 16, she was named WNBL Player of the Month for January. She led the Lynx to a second place regular season finish with a 16–8 win–loss record, and went on to score a game-high 23 points in the team's semi-final win over the first-seeded Townsville Fire. With the win, the Lynx advanced to the WNBL grand final for the first time since 1999. There they were outclassed by the defending champion Townsville (who made it to the grand final via the preliminary final), losing the best-of-three series 2–0. Laney-Hamilton appeared in all 27 games for the Lynx in 2015–16, averaging 15.2 points, 7.8 rebounds, 3.7 assists and 1.0 steals per game.

=== Overseas ===
In June 2019, Laney signed with Elitzur Holon of the Israeli League for the 2019-20 off-season.

In June 2020, Laney signed with Elitzur Ramla of the Israeli League for the 2020-21 off-season.

=== Unrivaled ===
On February 18, 2025, Laces BC signed Laney-Hamilton to a relief player contract. After appearing in just two games, Laney-Hamilton exited the league on March 3 due to an undisclosed injury. During her short playing time, BLH made waves in the league with her aggressive offense and strong defending skills.

== Career statistics ==
Legend
GP	Games played	GS	Games started	MPG	Minutes per game	RPG	Rebounds per game
APG	Assists per game	SPG	Steals per game	BPG	Blocks per game	PPG	Points per game
TO	Turnovers per game	FG%	Field-goal percentage	3P%	3-point field-goal percentage	FT%	Free-throw percentage
**Bold**	Career best	°	League leader

†	Denotes seasons in which Laney-Hamilton won a WNBA championship

=== WNBA ===
==== Regular season ====
Stats current through end of 2024 season

Betnijah Laney-Hamilton WNBA Regular Season Statistics
Year	Team	GP	GS	MPG	FG%	3P%	FT%	RPG	APG	SPG	BPG	TO	PPG
2015	Chicago	32	2	12.8	.394	.000	.696	2.1	0.6	0.5	**0.2**	0.6	2.9
2016	Chicago	8	1	5.3	.167	.000	**1.000**	0.6	0.1	0.1	0.0	**0.3**	1.0
2017	Did not play (injury)												
2018	Connecticut	29	0	9.3	.471	.111	.909	1.7	0.7	0.4	0.0	0.6	2.7
2019	Indiana	34	27	25.8	.362	.303	.581	4.2	1.7	1.4	0.1	1.4	5.6
2020	Atlanta	22	22	**33.5**	.481	**.405**	.827	**4.9**	4.0	**1.6**	0.1	3.0	**17.2**
2021	New York	32	32	33.4	.451	.312	.787	4.1	**5.2**	0.7	0.1	3.7	16.8
2022	New York	9	6	28.3	.422	.379	.875	3.3	2.8	0.4	0.1	2.7	11.2
2023	New York	**40**	**40**	30.0	**.499**	.392	.791	3.3	2.4	0.9	0.1	1.9	12.8
2024^{†}	New York	28	25	30.3	.456	.402	.906	4.2	3.3	1.1	0.0	2.4	11.8
**Career**	9 years, 5 teams	234	155	24.4	.451	.359	.799	3.3	2.4	0.9	0.1	1.9	9.5
**Career**	All-Star	1	0	16.8	.286	.000	–	1.0	2.0	0.0	0.0	1.0	4.0

==== Playoffs ====
Betnijah Laney-Hamilton WNBA Playoff Statistics
Year	Team	GP	GS	MPG	FG%	3P%	FT%	RPG	APG	SPG	BPG	TO	PPG
2015	Chicago	1	0	2.0	—	—	—	0.0	0.0	0.0	0.0	**1.0**	0.0
2021	New York	1	1	**37.0**	.455	**.429**	.667	4.0	3.0	1.0	0.0	2.0	**25.0**°
2022	New York	3	3	24.3	.419	.250	.875	4.0	**3.3**	0.7	**0.3**	2.3	11.3
2023	New York	10	10	36.1	**.473**	.365	.733	**4.1**	3.0	0.8	0.0	2.0	15.2
2024^{†}	New York	**11**	**11**	27.3	.369	.294	**1.000**	2.9	2.5	**1.1**	0.2	1.5	7.0
**Career**	5 years, 2 teams	26	25	29.7	.432	.340	.806	3.4	2.7	0.9	0.1	1.8	11.1

=== College ===
Betnijah Laney-Hamilton NCAA statistics
Year	Team	GP	GS	MPG	FG%	3P%	FT%	RPG	APG	SPG	BPG	TO	PPG
2011–12	Rutgers	32	11	20.9	.378	.278	.656	3.9	0.9	0.6	0.1	**1.6**	6.0
2012–13	Rutgers	30	29	31.1	.364	.190	.667	5.0	1.9	1.3	0.2	3.2	9.7
2013–14	Rutgers	**35**	**35**	33.8	.435	.300	**.747**	8.5	**2.9**	1.3	**0.3**	2.7	11.8
2014–15	Rutgers	32	32	**36.2**	**.486**	**.395**	.704	**10.7**	**2.9**	**1.8**	0.2	2.9	**15.8**
**Career**		129	107	30.6	.426	.289	.699	7.1	2.2	1.2	0.2	2.6	10.9

== Off the court ==
=== Personal life ===
Laney is married to Jordan Hamilton, a fellow basketball player.

=== Philanthropy ===
In February 2024, Laney-Hamilton joined the WNBA Changemakers Collective and their collaboration with VOICEINSPORT (VIS) as a mentor, "aimed at keeping girls in sport and developing diverse leaders on the court and beyond the game."
