= Valerie Higgins =

American basketball player

Personal information
- Born: May 26, 1998 (age 28)
- Listed height: 6 ft 1 in (1.85 m)

Career information
- High school: Chaminade College Prep (Los Angeles, California)
- College: USC (2017); Pacific (2018–2021)
- WNBA draft: 2021: 3rd round, 25th overall pick
- Drafted by: New York Liberty
- Position: Guard
- Number: 22

Career history
- 2021: New York Liberty

Career highlights
- 2x WCC Defensive Player of the Year (2019, 2021); 3x All-WCC (2019–2021)
- Stats at Basketball Reference
Medals
Women's basketball
Representing the United States
FIBA Americas Under-18 Championship
Gold medal – first place	2016 Chile	Team

Valerie Higgins (born May 26, 1998) is an American professional basketball player. She was drafted 25th overall in the third round of the 2021 WNBA draft by the New York Liberty of the Women's National Basketball Association.

Higgins grew up in West Hills, California, where she attended Chaminade College Prep. She was named to the Naismith High School All-America Watch List and was named a Jordan Brand Classic All-American. She participated in USA Basketball's U18 National Team Trials in 2016 and was named to the team for the 2016 FIBA Americas U18 Championship in Chile.

Higgins started her college career at the University of Southern California. She played one season with the Trojans, starting 15 of the 29 games she appeared in. she averaged 4.4 points, 2.4 rebounds, 1.7 assists and 1.6 steals at USC.

Higgins transferred to the University of the Pacific after her freshman year. After sitting out one year, she played three at Pacific. She totaled 1,375 points, 744 rebounds, and 278 steals and became the first Pacific player ever chosen in the WNBA Draft.

== Southern California and Pacific statistics ==
Legend
GP	Games played	GS	Games started	MPG	Minutes per game
FG%	Field goal percentage	3P%	3-point field goal percentage	FT%	Free throw percentage
RPG	Rebounds per game	APG	Assists per game	SPG	Steals per game
BPG	Blocks per game	PPG	Points per game	**Bold**	Career high

Year	Team	GP	Points	FG%	3P%	FT%	RPG	APG	SPG	BPG	PPG
2016–17	Southern California	29	127	37.5%	**35.1%**	51.4%	2.4	1.7	1.6	0.3	4.4
2017–18	Pacific	Did not play due to NCAA transfer rules									
2018–19	Pacific	**32**	**550**	46.1%	24.3%	77.9%	9.0	3.3	3.1	**1.2**	**17.2**
2019–20	Pacific	28	463	46.1%	18.4%	72.5%	9.1	**3.8**	3.5	0.8	16.5
2020–21	Pacific	22	362	**46.4%**	22.6%	**86.8%**	**9.7**	2.8	**3.8**	0.8	16.5
Career		111	1502	45.2%	25.0%	76.7%	7.5	2.9	3.0	0.8	13.5
