= 2022 WNBA playoffs =

Professional women's basketball tournament

- Dates: August 17 – September 18, 2022

Final positions
- Champions: Las Vegas Aces
- Runners-up: Connecticut Sun

Tournament statistics
- Attendance: 8,908 (average)
- Scoring leader (s): Chelsea Gray (Las Vegas) (21.7 PPG)

Awards
- MVP: Chelsea Gray (Las Vegas)

The 2022 WNBA playoffs was the postseason tournament of the WNBA's 2022 season. This postseason ended with the Las Vegas Aces winning their first championship.

== Format ==
In November 2021, the WNBA Board of Governors formalized a new playoff system that will structure the 2022 playoffs onward. The new playoff format scraps the single-elimination games of the first two rounds in favor of a best-of-3 quarterfinal round. As a result, all eight playoff teams, seeded according to overall regular season record regardless of conference (1 vs. 8, 2 vs. 7, 3 vs. 6, 4 vs. 5), will begin postseason play in the first round. Since 2016, seeds 3 and 4 received a bye to the second round (single game) and seeds 1 and 2 received a bye to the semifinals (best-of-5). In the first round series, the higher seeded team will host games 1 and 2, and the lower seeded team will host game 3 if necessary. In the semifinal round, no reseeding will take place, which means the winners of the 1 vs. 8 series will be paired with the winner of the 4 vs. 5 series as will the winners of the 2 vs. 7 and 3 vs. 6 series. The semifinal and final rounds will remain best-of-5 series in which the higher seeded team hosts games 1, 2 and (if necessary) 5 while the lower seeded team hosts games 3 and (if necessary) 4.

== Broadcast ==
All games were aired across the ESPN family of networks, which includes ESPN, ESPN2, ABC, and ESPNU.

== Playoff qualifying ==
Seed	Team	Record	Clinched	
Seed	Team	Record	Playoff berth	Top Record
1	Las Vegas Aces^{[note 1]}	26–10	July 24	August 14
2	Chicago Sky^{[note 1]}	26–10	July 20	No
3	Connecticut Sun	25–11	July 28	No
4	Seattle Storm^{[note 2]}	22–14	July 30	No
5	Washington Mystics^{[note 2]}	22–14	July 30	No
6	Dallas Wings	18–18	August 8	No
7	New York Liberty	16–20	August 14	No
8	Phoenix Mercury	15–21	August 14	No

^{[note 1]} Las Vegas earned the first seed by virtue of its superior head-to-head record against Chicago (2–1).

^{[note 2]} Seattle earned the fourth seed by virtue of its superior head-to-head record against Washington (2–1).

For the first time since 2016, four teams from each conference qualified for the playoffs. For the previous five straight years, one extra Western Conference team qualified for the playoffs. Seven of the eight playoff teams were the same as in 2021. The only difference was the Washington Mystics qualifying this year instead of the Minnesota Lynx.

== Bracket ==
**First round** Best-of-3
**1**	**Las Vegas Aces**	**2**
8	Phoenix Mercury	0
**4**	**Seattle Storm**	**2**
5	Washington Mystics	0
**2**	**Chicago Sky**	**2**
7	New York Liberty	1
**3**	**Connecticut Sun**	**2**
6	Dallas Wings	1

**Semifinals**; Best-of-5
**1**	**Las Vegas Aces**	**3**
4	Seattle Storm	1
2	Chicago Sky	2
**3**	**Connecticut Sun**	**3**

**Finals**; Best-of-5
**1**	**Las Vegas Aces**	**3**
3	Connecticut Sun	1

- **Bold** – Series winner
- Italic – Team with home-court advantage

== First round ==
=== Las Vegas Aces vs. Phoenix Mercury ===
The first seed Las Vegas Aces played the eight seed Phoenix Mercury. Las Vegas entered the series having won eight of its last ten games, including a Commissioner's Cup victory. Las Vegas secured the first seed on the last day of the season and defeated second seed Chicago in their penultimate game of the season. Phoenix entered the series having won five of its last ten games and lost on the final day of the season. Phoenix secured the eighth and final playoff spot due to other results on the last day of the season. The Aces won the season series 3–0. The Aces continued their regular season dominance of the Mercury and won the series two games to zero.

==== Game 1 ====
Game one started off as a close affair with the Aces winning the first quarter 21–20. They continued to build a slight lead and won the second quarter 21–17 to take a five point lead into halftime. Both teams struggled to score points with the quarter finishing 9–9. However, the Aces accelerated in the fourth quarter winning the quarter 28–17 to win the game by a comfortable sixteen points. The Aces were led in scoring by Kelsey Plum who had twenty-two points. Chelsea Gray scored seventeen points and Jackie Young added sixteen points to round out the Aces' double digit point scorers. The Aces also had two players with double digit rebounds: Kiah Stokes with thirteen and A'ja Wilson with twelve. The Mercury had three players score in double figures, led by Diamond DeShields with eighteen points. Megan Gustafson and Sophie Cunningham added twelve each. Only Brianna Turner had double digit rebounds with sixteen.

ESPN, NBA TV Canada

August 17
10:00 p.m.

Report

#1 **Las Vegas Aces** **79**, #8 Phoenix Mercury 63
Scoring by quarter: **21**–20, **21**–17, 9–9, **28**–17
Pts: Kelsey Plum (22); Rebs: Kiah Stokes (13); Asts: Chelsea Gray; Kelsey Plum (4)	Pts: Diamond DeShields (18); Rebs: Brianna Turner (16); Asts: Shey Peddy (5)

Michelob Ultra Arena
Attendance: 8,725
Referees: Roy Gulbeyan, Amy Bonner, Tony Patillo, Clare Aubry

==== Game 2 ====
Both teams started game two hot, and the first quarter finished 34–30 in favor of Las Vegas. The 64 points in the quarter were the most in the series. However, Phoenix cooled off in the second quarter, only scoring 14 points and allowing Las Vegas to win the quarter 29–14. Las Vegas' nineteen-point halftime lead would only grow in the third quarter, as they won the quarter 30–15. Despite taking a thirty-four point lead into the fourth quarter, Las Vegas did not let up and continued to grow their lead, winning the fourth quarter 24–21 and the game by thirty-seven points. The Aces had six players score in double digits, led by Chelsea Gray with twenty-seven points. Kelsey Plum added twenty-two points, A'ja Wilson scored seventeen points, Jackie Young scored fifteen points, and both Riquna Williams and Kierstan Bell added eleven points from the bench. The Mercury only had two players score in double digits: Kaela Davis led the team with twenty-three points off the bench, and Diamond DeShields scored twenty-one points.

ESPN2, NBA TV Canada

August 20
9:00 p.m.

Report

**#1 Las Vegas Aces** **117**, #8 Phoenix Mercury 80
Scoring by quarter: **34**–30, **29**–14, **30**–15, **24**–21
Pts: Chelsea Gray (27); Rebs: Riquna Williams (5); Asts: Chelsea Gray (8)	Pts: Kaela Davis (23); Rebs: Brianna Turner (7); Asts: Kaela Davis; Megan Gustafson; Brianna Turner; Jennie Simms (3)

Michelob Ultra Arena
Attendance: 9,126
Referees: Maj Forsberg, Tiara Kruse, Matt Kallio, Clare Aubry

=== Chicago Sky vs. New York Liberty ===
The second seed Chicago Sky played the seventh seed New York Liberty. Chicago entered the series having won seven of its last ten regular season games. Chicago lost to Las Vegas in their penultimate game of the season to fall to the second seed in the playoffs. New York entered the series having also won seven of their last ten regular season games. Their final day victory over Atlanta secured them the seventh seed in the playoffs. Chicago won the regular season series 3–1.

==== Game 1 ====
Game one of the series started was a back and forth affair, with Chicago taking the first quarter 24–20. New York stormed back to take the second quarter 28–21, which gave them a three point halftime lead. Chicago came out of halftime strong, winning the third quarter 29–25 and taking a one point lead into the final period. Chicago had a six point lead with 6:36 left in the game, but failed to score another point. New York went on a 13–0 run to win the fourth quarter 25–17 and the game by seven points. The win was New York's first playoff win since 2015. The Liberty were lead in scoring by Natasha Howard and Sabrina Ionescu who both scored twenty-two points. Betnijah Laney added seventeen and Stefanie Dolson scored thirteen to round out the double digit scorers. No player for the Liberty finished with double digit rebounds. The Sky were lead in scoring by Kahleah Copper with twenty-one points. Allie Quigley scored eighteen, Candace Parker scored seventeen, Azurá Stevens added sixteen, and Courtney Vandersloot scored thirteen to round out the double digit scorers. Parker and Vandersloot recorded double-doubles by adding ten rebounds and ten assists, respectively.

ESPN2, SN360

August 17
8:00 p.m.

Report

#2 Chicago Sky 91, **#7 New York Liberty** **98**
Scoring by quarter: **24**–20, 21–**28**, **29**–25, 17–**25**
Pts: Kahleah Copper (21); Rebs: Candace Parker (10); Asts: Courtney Vandersloot (10)	Pts: Natasha Howard; Sabrina Ionescu (22); Rebs: Stefanie Dolson; Natasha Howard; Sabrina Ionescu (7); Asts: Marine Johannès (7)

Wintrust Arena
Attendance: 7,524
Referees: Jeff Wooten, Cheryl Flores, Isaac Barnett, Angel Kent

==== Game 2 ====
Chicago got off to an early lead in Game two of the series, winning the first quarter 31–10. They would continue to build their lead in the second quarter, with the quarter finishing 21–18. The Sky would build on that twenty-four point halftime lead in the third quarter winning, 31–16. Their thirty-nine point lead would prove in surmountable. New York did win the fourth quarter 18–17, but that left the Sky winning the game by thirty-eight points to force a game three of the series. Chicago had five players score in double figures, led by Kahleah Copper with twenty points. Candace Parker recorded a double-double by adding twelve points and twelve rebounds. Courtney Vandersloot scored sixteen points, Azurá Stevens scored fourteen points, and Rebekah Gardner rounded out the double digit scorers with eleven points. The Liberty only had two double digit scorers, Michaela Onyenwere and Han Xu scored ten points.

ESPN, NBA TV Canada

August 20
12:00 p.m.

Report

**#2 Chicago Sky** **100**, #7 New York Liberty 62
Scoring by quarter: **31**–10, **21**–18, **31**–16, 17–**18**
Pts: Kahleah Copper (20); Rebs: Candace Parker (12); Asts: Allie Quigley (8)	Pts: Michaela Onyenwere; Han Xu (10); Rebs: Sabrina Ionescu; Han Xu (5); Asts: Stefanie Dolson; Betnijah Laney; Sabrina Ionescu; Sami Whitcomb (3)

Wintrust Arena
Attendance: 7,732
Referees: Eric Brewton, Toni Patillo, Randy Richardson, Angel Kent

==== Game 3 ====
The deciding game three of the series began fairly evenly, with Chicago winning the first quarter 25–20. Chicago continue to build a lead throughout the second quarter and won 29–22, to take a twelve-point lead into halftime. The Liberty rebounded after halftime to win the third quarter by two points, cutting the Sky's lead to ten. However, the Sky won the fourth quarter 22–14 to win the game by eighteen points and to clinch a 2–1 series victory. The Sky had six players score in double figures and two players record double-doubles. Their leading scorers were Kahleah Copper and Allie Quigley who both scored fifteen points. Candace Parker and Courtney Vandersloot recorded double doubles with fourteen points and thirteen rebounds, and fourteen points and ten assists, respectively. Emma Meesseman and Azurá Stevens rounded out the double digit scorers with twelve points each. The Liberty had three players finish in double scoring figures, led by Betnijah Laney with fifteen points. Natasha Howard and Sabrina Ionescu added fourteen each to round out the double digit scorers.

ESPN, TSN1/4

August 23
9:00 p.m.

Report

#7 New York Liberty 72, **#2 Chicago Sky** **90**
Scoring by quarter: 20–**25**, 22–**29**, **16**–14, 14–**22**
Pts: Betnijah Laney (15); Rebs: Natasha Howard (11); Asts: Sabrina Ionescu; Marine Johannès (4)	Pts: Kahleah Copper; Allie Quigley (15); Rebs: Candace Parker (13); Asts: Courtney Vandersloot (10)

Barclays Center
Attendance: 7,836
Referees: Maj Forsberg, Tim Greene, Tiara Cruse, Dannica Mosher

=== Connecticut Sun vs. Dallas Wings ===
The third seed Connecticut Sun played the sixth seed Dallas Wings. Connecticut entered the series having won eight of their last ten games, with their only two losses during that time frame coming to the second seeded Chicago Sky. Dallas entered the series having won seven of their last ten games, including wins over top playoff seeds Las Vegas and Chicago. Dallas won the regular season series 2–1.

==== Game 1 ====
Game one started as a tight affair with Connecticut winning the first quarter 22–19. Connecticut continued to build a lead throughout the second quarter and won it 25–18, taking a ten point lead into halftime. Their dominance continued in the third quarter, with a final score of 21–13 in favor of the Sun. They did not rest on their lead in the fourth, winning the quarter 25–18 and the game by twenty-five points. The Sun had five players finish scoring in double figures, led by Jonquel Jones with nineteen points. Alyssa Thomas had fifteen points and recorded double-double by virtue of adding ten rebounds. Other double-digit point scorers included rookie DiJonai Carrington with thirteen points, DeWanna Bonner with twelve points, and Courtney Williams with ten points. The Wings had four double-digit points scorers and no double-digit rebounders. They were led by Allisha Gray who scored seventeen points, while Tyasha Harris added thirteen, Marina Mabrey scored eleven and Satou Sabally finished with ten points.

ESPNU/NBA TV, TSN2

August 18
8:00 p.m.

Report

#3 **Connecticut Sun** **93**, #6 Dallas Wings 68
Scoring by quarter: **22**–19, **25**–18, **21**–13, **25**–18
Pts: Jonquel Jones (19); Rebs: Alyssa Thomas (10); Asts: Alyssa Thomas (7)	Pts: Allisha Gray (17); Rebs: Allisha Gray; Tyasha Harris; Teaira McCowan (5); Asts: Veronica Burton; Tyasha Harris (3)

Mohegan Sun Arena
Attendance: 4,797
Referees: Eric Brewton, Kurt Walker, Jenna Reneau, Dannica Mosher

==== Game 2 ====
Game two began with a blowout first quarter win for Dallas with the quarter finishing 22–7. The second quarter was more even, but Dallas still won by a point, 24–23. Dallas expanded its halftime lead in the third quarter, winning 30–17. Connecticut made an effort to come back from the twenty-nine point deficit the Sun faced entering the fourth quarter. They won the fourth quarter 32–13, but the effort was not enough to erase the lead and Dallas forced a game three. Dallas had four players score in double digits, led by Kayla Thornton with twenty points. Teaira McCowan recorded a double-double from the bench, scoring seventeen points and recording eleven rebounds. Allisha Gray scored fifteen points, and Marina Mabrey rounded out the double figures scorers with fourteen. The Sun had three players score in double figures, with Jonquel Jones and Brionna Jones both scoring twenty points. The other double digit scorer was DiJonai Carrington with thirteen points.

ABC, SN1

August 21
12:00 p.m.

Report

#3 Connecticut Sun 79, **#6 Dallas Wings** **89**
Scoring by quarter: 7–**22**, 23–**24**, 17–**30**, **32**–13
Pts: Jonquel Jones; Brionna Jones (20); Rebs: Jonquel Jones (9); Asts: Alyssa Thomas (5)	Pts: Kayla Thornton (20); Rebs: Teaira McCowan (11); Asts: Allisha Gray (8)

Mohegan Sun Arena
Attendance: 6,788
Referees: Jeffrey Smith, Cheryl Flores, Isaac Barnett, Jenna Reneau

==== Game 3 ====
Game three started off with a slight edge to the home team, as Dallas won the first quarter 19–15. In a mirror image of the first, Connecticut won the second quarter 19–15, and the game headed to halftime tied. Connecticut build a large advantage coming out of the half, winning the third quarter 23–12. They built on their eleven point lead in the fourth quarter, winning 16–12. The Sun won Game three by fifteen points and advanced to the Semifinals. The Sun had four players in double scoring figures, led by DeWanna Bonner with twenty-one points. Jonquel Jones recorded a double-double with eleven points and ten rebounds. Alyssa Thomas scored thirteen points and Natisha Hiedeman scored eleven to round out the double digit scorers. The Wings only had two players score in double digits: Marina Mabrey with twenty points and Veronica Burton with ten.

ESPN, TSN1/3/4

August 24
9:00 p.m.

Report

#6 Dallas Wings 58, **#3 Connecticut Sun** **73**
Scoring by quarter: **19**–15, 15–**19**, 12–**23**, 12–**16**
Pts: Marina Mabrey (20); Rebs: Teaira McCowan (12); Asts: Veronica Burton; Allisha Gray (4)	Pts: DeWanna Bonner (21); Rebs: Jonquel Jones (10); Asts: DeWanna Bonner (5)

College Park Center
Attendance: 5,016
Referees: Roy Gulbeyan, Amy Bonner, Toni Patillo, Randy Richardson

=== Seattle Storm vs. Washington Mystics ===
The fourth seed Seattle Storm played the fifth seed Washington Mystics. Seattle entered the series having won five of its last ten games. Washington entered the series having won seven of their last ten games. Seattle won the season series 2–1, with two of those games coming in the last ten games of the season. The teams split those final games 1–1.

==== Game 1 ====
Game one of the series was a closely contested affair with the teams ending the first quarter tied, 18–18. Washington had a slight edge in the second quarter with it finishing 24–22, and they took a two-point lead into halftime. Seattle edged the third quarter 24–23, which left Washington with a one point lead heading into the final quarter of play. Seattle finished strong winning the final quarter 22–18, which gave them a three-point game one victory. Seattle had four players scoring in double figures, led by Breanna Stewart who scored twenty-three points, and added twelve rebounds to finish with a double-double. Jewell Loyd scored sixteen points, Gabby Williams added twelve, and Sue Bird rounded out the double-digit scorers with ten points. Washington also had four players score in double figures, led by Elena Delle Donne with twenty-six points. Ariel Atkins and Natasha Cloud both scored sixteen points, and rookie Shakira Austin finished with twelve points.

ESPN2, TSN2

August 18
10:00 p.m.

Report

#4 **Seattle Storm** **86**, #5 Washington Mystics 83
Scoring by quarter: 18–18, 22–**24**, **24**–23, **22**–18
Pts: Breanna Stewart (23); Rebs: Breanna Stewart (12); Asts: Gabby Williams (6)	Pts: Elena Delle Donne (26); Rebs: Shakira Austin (7); Asts: Elena Delle Donne (5)

Climate Pledge Arena
Attendance: 8,917
Referees: Angelica Suffren, Maj Forsberg, Tiara Cruse, Robert Hussey

==== Game 2 ====
Seattle got out to an early lead in Game two of the series, winning the first quarter 27–17. Washington fought back in the second quarter, winning 26–18, and Seattle took a two-point lead into halftime. Seattle came out strong after the half, winning the third quarter 26–18. The ten-point lead proved insurmountable for the Mystics in the fourth quarter, as Seattle won the quarter 26–23. The thirteen point win, secured a two games to zero series victory for the Storm, and they advanced to the Semifinals. The Storm had five players score in double figures. Breanna Stewart lead the team with twenty-one points, and added ten rebounds to record her second double-double of the series. Sue Bird also recorded a double double with eighteen points and ten assists. Jewell Loyd scored nineteen points, Gabby Williams added fourteen points, and Tina Charles rounded out the double digit scorers with twelve points. The Mystics also had five players score in double figures, led by Natasha Cloud with twenty-one points. Ariel Atkins added fifteen points, Elena Delle Donne and Shatori Walker-Kimbrough added twelve points each, and Alysha Clark scored ten points.

ESPN, NBA TV Canada

August 21
4:00 p.m.

Report

#4 **Seattle Storm** **97**, #5 Washington Mystics 84
Scoring by quarter: **27**–17, 18–**26**, **26**–18, **26**–23
Pts: Breanna Stewart (21); Rebs: Breanna Stewart (10); Asts: Sue Bird (10)	Pts: Natasha Cloud (21); Rebs: Ariel Atkins (8); Asts: Shakira Austin (7)

Climate Pledge Arena
Attendance: 12,490
Referees: Roy Gulbeyan, Amy Bonner, Angelica Suffren, Tim Greene

== Semifinals ==
=== Las Vegas Aces vs. Seattle Storm ===
The Aces and the Storm will face off in the first semifinal series of the playoffs. Both teams enter the series having swept their First Round match-ups two games to zero. The first seed Aces won over the eight seeded Phoenix Mercury and the fourth seed Storm won over the fifth seeded Washington Mystics. The teams played four games during the regular season, and the Aces won three of the four games.

==== Game 1 ====
Seattle started Game One strongly and won the first quarter 26–15. The Aces came back in the second quarter and reduced the deficit by winning 21–17. The Storm took a seven point lead into half time. The third quarter's final score was a repeat of the second's, finishing again 21–17 in the Aces' favor. In the fourth quarter, the Storm held on to their slim lead, and the quarter finished 16–16, allowing the Storm to win the game by three points. The Storm had three players finish in double digits, led by Jewell Loyd with twenty-six points. Tina Charles scored thirteen points and grabbed eighteen rebounds to record a double-double. The other double digit scorer for the storm was Breanna Stewart who had twenty-four points. The Aces also had three double digit scorers, led by Chelsea Gray with twenty-one points. Kelsey Plum scored twenty points and Jackie Young rounded out the double figures scorers with eleven points.

ESPN, TSN3/4

August 28
4:00 p.m.

Report

#1 Las Vegas Aces 73, #4 **Seattle Storm** **76**
Scoring by quarter: 15–**26**, **21**–17, **21**–17, 16–16
Pts: Chelsea Gray (21); Rebs: A'ja Wilson (12); Asts: Chelsea Gray; Jackie Young (5)	Pts: Jewell Loyd (26); Rebs: Tina Charles (18); Asts: Sue Bird (12)

Michelob Ultra Arena
Attendance: 9,944
Referees: Eric Brewton, Isaac Barnett, Toni Patillo, Randy Richardson

==== Game 2 ====
Seattle came out strong in Game Two of the series, winning the first quarter 23–16. However, the Aces responded in the second quarter, winning 20–13 to make the game tied going into halftime. The Aces continued their momentum after the break, winning the third quarter 24–16. The Storm mounted a comeback and won the fourth quarter 21–18, but it ultimately game up short. The Aces won the game by seven points to even the series at one game a piece. The Aces only had three players score in double figures, led by A'ja Wilson with thirty-three points. Wilson recorded a double-double by also notching thirteen rebounds. Chelsea Gray scored nineteen points and Kelsey Plum added eighteen to round out double digit scorers. Only Jackie Young and Riquna Williams scored points for the Aces. The Storm were led by Breanna Stewart who scored thirty-two points. Their only other double-digit scorer was Tina Charles with seventeen.

ESPN2, SN360

August 31
10:00 p.m.

Report

#1 **Las Vegas Aces** **78**, #4 Seattle Storm 73
Scoring by quarter: 16–**23**, **20**–13, **24**–16, 18–**21**
Pts: A'ja Wilson (33); Rebs: A'ja Wilson (13); Asts: Chelsea Gray (7)	Pts: Breanna Stewart (32); Rebs: Tina Charles (9); Asts: Sue Bird (6)

Michelob Ultra Arena
Attendance: 9,755
Referees: Amy Bonner, Maj Forsberg, Tim Greene, Tiara Cruse

==== Game 3 ====
Las Vegas started Game Three well, on the road, and won the first quarter 28–20. The second quarter ended tied at 20, and Vegas took an eight point lead into halftime. Seattle came out of halftime and won the third quarter 24–20 to reduce the deficit to four points going into the fourth quarter. Again, Seattle won the quarter 28–24, to send the game into overtime. This was the first overtime game of the 2022 playoffs. Las Vegas dominated the overtime period 18–6 to win the game and take a two to one series lead. The Aces were led by A'ja Wilson who had a double-double by scoring thirty-four points and 11 rebounds. Chelsea Gray also had a double-double with 29 points and 12 assists. Kiah Stokes missed out on a double-double by just one point as she scored nine points and had twelve rebounds. Kelsey Plum added sixteen points and Riquna Williams scored fourteen points from the bench. Seattle was led by Breanna Stewart who recorded a double-double with twenty points and fifteen rebounds. Jewell Loyd and Sue Bird scored seventeen points, Tina Charles scored sixteen, Stephanie Talbot scored twelve and Ezi Magbegor scored ten.

ABC, NBA TV Canada

September 4
3:00 p.m.

Report

#4 Seattle Storm 98, #1 **Las Vegas Aces** **110** (OT)
Scoring by quarter: 20–**28**, 20–20, **24**–20, **28**–24, Overtime: 6–**18**
Pts: Breanna Stewart (20); Rebs: Breanna Stewart (15); Asts: Sue Bird (8)	Pts: A'ja Wilson (34); Rebs: Kiah Stokes (12); Asts: Chelsea Gray (12)

Climate Pledge Arena
Attendance: 15,431
Referees: Roy Gulbeyan, Cheryl Flores Isaac Barnett, Toni Patillo

==== Game 4 ====
Seattle started Game Four strongly by winning the first quarter 23–19. Las Vegas fought back in the second quarter and won 25–24. Seattle took a three-point lead into halftime. Las Vegas dominated the third quarter and won by ten-points, 22–12. Seattle mounted a comeback and won the fourth quarter 33–31, but it was not enough to win the game. Las Vegas won by five points and secured a three to one series victory. They advanced to the WNBA Finals with the win. The Aces were led by Chelsea Gray, who scored thirty-one points and had ten assists to complete a double-double. A'ja Wilson also had a double-double by scoring twenty-three points and recording thirteen rebounds. Jackie Young scored eighteen points, and Kelsey Plum added fifteen to round out the double digit point scorers. The Storm only had two players score in double figures, and were led by Breanna Stewart. Stewart scored forty-two points, which tied the WNBA record for points in a playoff game. Jewell Loyd scored twenty-nine points.

ESPN2, TSN3

September 6
10:00 p.m.

Report

#4 Seattle Storm 92, **#1 Las Vegas Aces** **97**
Scoring by quarter: **23**–19, 24–**25**, 12–**22**, **33**–31
Pts: Breanna Stewart (42); Rebs: Tina Charles (9); Asts: Sue Bird (8)	Pts: Chelsea Gray (31); Rebs: A'ja Wilson (13); Asts: Chelsea Gray (10)

Climate Pledge Arena
Attendance: 11,328
Referees: Eric Brewton, Tiara Cruse, Toni Patillo, Dannica Mosher

=== Chicago Sky vs. Connecticut Sun ===
The Sky and the Sun faced off in the second semifinal series of the playoffs. Both teams won their First Round match-ups two games to one, with both teams losing a game on their home courts. The second seed Sky won over the seventh seed New York Liberty and the third seed Sun won over the sixth seed Dallas Wings. The teams played four times in the regular season with the Sky winning all four games.

==== Game 1 ====
Game One of the series was a back and forth affair with the Sun winning the first quarter 19–16. The Sky came back to win the second quarter 18–15, and the game was tied at thirty-four going into half time. The Sun had a strong third quarter, winning 20–12, and took an eight point advantage into the final period. The Sky did win the fourth quarter 17–14, but it was not enough to overcome the deficit and the Sun took Game One by four points. The Sun had four players score in double figures, led by DeWanna Bonner with fifteen points. Alyssa Thomas recorded her second double-double of the playoffs by scoring twelve points and ten rebounds. Jonquel Jones and Brionna Jones each scored twelve points to round out the double digit scorers for the Sun. The Sky were led by Candace Parker who recorded her fourth double-double of the playoffs by scoring nineteen points and eighteen rebounds. Kahleah Copper added thirteen points and Emma Meesseman scored ten.

ESPN2, TSN5

August 28
8:00 p.m.

Report

#2 Chicago Sky 63, **#3 Connecticut Sun** **68**
Scoring by quarter: 16–**19**, **18**–15, 12–**20**, **17**–14
Pts: Candace Parker (19); Rebs: Candace Parker (18); Asts: Emma Meesseman (7)	Pts: DeWanna Bonner (15); Rebs: Alyssa Thomas (10); Asts: Alyssa Thomas (7)

Wintrust Arena
Attendance: 8,955
Referees: Amy Bonner, Tim Greene, Cheryl Flores, Dannica Mosher

==== Game 2 ====
The Sky came out strong in Game Two and won the first quarter by ten points, 24–14. They continued their dominance in the second quarter, winning 23–18, and took a fifteen point lead into halftime. The third quarter was closer, but the Sky still won 18–16. Connecticut mounted a comeback in the fourth quarter, winning 29–20, but it was not enough to overcome their deficit. The Sky won game two by eight points to even the series at one game a piece. The Sky had five players, all their starters, score in double figures. They were led by Candace Parker who scored twenty-two points. Emma Meesseman scored fourteen points, Allie Quigley added thirteen, Kahleah Copper scored twelve, and Courtney Vandersloot added ten. The Sun only had two players score in double figures; Jonquel Jones with twenty-three and Natisha Hiedeman with fourteen.

ESPN2, NBA TV Canada

August 31
8:00 p.m.

Report

**#2 Chicago Sky** **85**, #3 Connecticut Sun 77
Scoring by quarter: **24**–14, **23**–18, **18**–16, 20–**29**
Pts: Candace Parker (22); Rebs: Emma Meesseman (7); Asts: Courtney Vandersloot (8)	Pts: Jonquel Jones (23); Rebs: Alyssa Thomas (10); Asts: Alyssa Thomas (4)

Wintrust Arena
Attendance: 8,311
Referees: Roy Gulbeyan, Isaac Barnett, Toni Patillo, Dannica Mosher

==== Game 3 ====
Game Three started with Connecticut winning the first quarter 21–18. Chicago came back to win the second quarter 22–17 and take a two-point lead into half time. The game remained on a knife's edge throughout the third quarter and Connecticut came out on top, 17–16. The Sky carried a one point lead into the fourth and were able to hold that lead, winning the quarter 20–17. Their four point Game Three victory gave Chicago a two to on series lead. The Sky were led by Candace Parker who recorded her fifth double-double of the playoffs, scoring sixteen points and eleven rebounds. Kahleah Copper scored fifteen points, Emma Meesseman scored thirteen points and Courtney Vandersloot rounded out the double-digit scorers with twelve points. The Sun were led by DeWanna Bonner, who had a double-double with eighteen points and eleven rebounds. Natisha Hiedeman scored fourteen points, Courtney Williams scored twelve, and Brionna Jones also scored twelve from the bench.

ESPN2, NBA TV Canada

September 4
1:00 p.m.

Report

#3 Connecticut Sun 72, **#2 Chicago Sky** **76**
Scoring by quarter: **21**–18, 17–**22**, **17**–16, 17–**20**
Pts: DeWanna Bonner (18); Rebs: Alyssa Thomas (13); Asts: Alyssa Thomas (7)	Pts: Candace Parker (16); Rebs: Candace Parker (11); Asts: Emma Meesseman (6)

Mohegan Sun Arena
Attendance: 9,142
Referees: Eric Brewton, Maj Forsberg, Tiara Cruse

==== Game 4 ====
Connecticut started Game Four well and won the first quarter 30–22. They continued their dominance in the second quarter and won 28–19, to take a seventeen-point lead into halftime. They expanded upon that lead in the third quarter, winning 25–20. Connecticut also won the fourth quarter 21–19, to force a decisive Game Five in the series. The Sun had six players score in double digits, led by Courtney Williams and DeWanna Bonner who both scored nineteen points. Alyssa Thomas scored seventeen, DiJonai Carrington scored twelve, Brionna Jones scored eleven, and Odyssey Sims scored ten points. The Sky also had six players score in double figures, and were led by Kahleah Copper with sixteen points. Emma Meesseman scored fourteen, Candace Parker added eleven, and Allie Quigley, Courtney Vandersloot, and Dana Evans all scored ten points.

ESPN2, TSN3

September 6
8:00 p.m.

Report

**#3 Connecticut Sun** **104**, #2 Chicago Sky 80
Scoring by quarter: **30**–22, **28**–19, **25**–20, **21**–19
Pts: DeWanna Bonner; Courtney Williams (19); Rebs: Alyssa Thomas (8); Asts: Jonquel Jones (5)	Pts: Kahleah Copper (16); Rebs: Candace Parker (9); Asts: Emma Meesseman (6)

Mohegan Sun Arena
Attendance: 5,868
Referees: Roy Gulbeyan, Amy Bonner, Tim Greene

==== Game 5 ====
Game Five was in Chicago, but Connecticut got off to a hot start, winning the first quarter 24–16. The second quarter was a mirror of the first quarter and Chicago won 24–16. The game was tied heading into halftime, with a trip to the WNBA Finals on the line. Coming out of the half, Chicago posted a strong quarter and won 18–8. However, Connecticut dominated the fourth quarter 24–5 and won the game by nine points to secure a three games to two series win and a trip to the WNBA Finals. The Sun had all five of their starters score in double figures, and just two bench players score points. They were led by DeWanna Bonner and Jonquel Jones who each scored fifteen points. Jones also posted a double-double by recording ten rebounds. Natisha Hiedeman scored fourteen points, and Alyssa Thomas and Courtney Williams both scored twelve. The Sky had three players finish in double figures and were led by Kahleah Copper with twenty-two points. Emma Meesseman scored fourteen and Courtney Vandersloot scored twelve points.

ESPN2, NBA TV Canada

September 8
8:00 p.m.

Report

#2 Chicago Sky 63, **#3 Connecticut Sun** **72**
Scoring by quarter: 16–**24**, **24**–16, **18**–8, 5–**24**
Pts: Kahleah Copper (22); Rebs: Candace Parker (9); Asts: Allie Quigley (9)	Pts: DeWanna Bonner; Jonquel Jones (15); Rebs: Jonquel Jones; Alyssa Thomas (10); Asts: Alyssa Thomas (8)

Wintrust Arena
Attendance: 8,014
Referees: Maj Forsberg, Cheryl Flores, Dannica Mosher, Randy Richardson

== WNBA Finals ==
=== Las Vegas Aces vs. Connecticut Sun ===
==== Game 1 ====
ABC, TSN5

September 11
3:00 p.m.

Report

**#1 Las Vegas Aces** **67**, #3 Connecticut Sun 64
Scoring by quarter: **25**–17, 9–**21**, **21**–15, **12**–11
Pts: A'ja Wilson (24); Rebs: A'ja Wilson (11); Asts: Chelsea Gray (3)	Pts: Alyssa Thomas (19); Rebs: Alyssa Thomas (11); Asts: DeWanna Bonner; Alyssa Thomas (5)

Michelob Ultra Arena
Attendance: 10,135
Referees: Eric Brewton, Tiara Cruse, Dannica Mosher, Randy Richardson

==== Game 2 ====
ESPN, TSN1/4

September 13
9:00 p.m.

Report

**#1 Las Vegas Aces** **85**, #3 Connecticut Sun 71
Scoring by quarter: **23**–15, 22–22, **23**–17, 17–17
Pts: A'ja Wilson (26); Rebs: A'ja Wilson (10); Asts: Chelsea Gray (8)	Pts: Courtney Williams (18); Rebs: Jonquel Jones (11); Asts: Courtney Williams (5)

Michelob Ultra Arena
Attendance: 10,211
Referees: Roy Gulbeyan, Tim Greene, Cheryl Flores, Dannica Mosher

==== Game 3 ====
ESPN, SN360

September 15
9:00 p.m.

Report

**#3 Connecticut Sun** **105**, #1 Las Vegas Aces 76
Scoring by quarter: **34**–19, 19–**23**, 24–**27**, **28**–7
Pts: Jonquel Jones (20); Rebs: Alyssa Thomas (15); Asts: Alyssa Thomas (11)	Pts: Jackie Young (22); Rebs: Kiah Stokes (7); Asts: Chelsea Gray (11)

Mohegan Sun Arena
Attendance: 8,745
Referees: Amy Bonner, Maj Forsberg, Isaac Barnett

==== Game 4 ====
ESPN, SN1

September 18
4:00 p.m.

Report

#3 Connecticut Sun 71, **#1 Las Vegas Aces** **78**
Scoring by quarter: 12–**16**, **16**–14, 21–**23**, 22–**25**
Pts: Courtney Williams (17); Rebs: Alyssa Thomas (10); Asts: Alyssa Thomas (11)	Pts: Chelsea Gray (20); Rebs: A'ja Wilson (14); Asts: Jackie Young (8)

Mohegan Sun Arena
Attendance: 9,652
Referees: Eric Brewton, Tim Greene, Tiara Cruse
