= NBA TV Canada =

Canadian sports channel

- Country: Canada
- Broadcast area: Nationwide
- Headquarters: Toronto, Ontario

Programming
- Language: English
- Picture format: 1080i HDTV (downscaled to letterboxed 480i for the SDTV feed)

Ownership
- Owner: Maple Leaf Sports & Entertainment (Toronto Raptors Network, Ltd.) under license from National Basketball Association
- Sister channels: Leafs Nation Network (defunct)

History
- Launched: September 7, 2001; 24 years ago
- Former names: Raptors NBA TV (2001–2010)

Links
- Website: NBA TV Canada

NBA TV Canada is a Canadian English language discretionary specialty channel owned by Maple Leaf Sports & Entertainment (MLSE). It is the Canadian version of NBA TV, broadcasting programming focused on the National Basketball Association, and its Canadian franchise, the Toronto Raptors. (Note: Due to licensing restrictions by Bell Media, Rogers and Groupe TVA, Toronto Raptors live telecasts outside of pre-season may not be available on NBA TV Canada, but it does show highlights)

== History ==
In December 2000, MLSE was granted approval by the Canadian Radio-television and Telecommunications Commission (CRTC) for a Category 2 digital specialty channel licence tentatively known as Raptors Basketball Channel, a channel described as being devoted primarily to the Toronto Raptors basketball franchise and the National Basketball Association (NBA), with additional programming related to other aspects of basketball.

With the launch of other Canadian channels, the channel was launched on 7 September 2001, as Raptors NBA TV, with programming focused on the NBA and other basketball-related programming, although it maintained a particular emphasis on the Toronto Raptors. Paul Graham became a senior producer for Raptors NBA TV in 2003. On 1 November 2005, the high-definition version of this channel, named NBA TV Canada HD, was launched, originally named Raptors NBA TV HD.

On 15 October 2010, the channel renamed Raptors NBA TV to NBA TV Canada, being the current and second name of the channel, as the channel began to air more programming devoted to the NBA and international basketball in general, sourced from its American counterpart.

The channel was valued at $21 million on behalf of the CRTC in mid-2012.

== Programming ==
NBA TV Canada broadcasts programming primarily related to the NBA and the Raptors, as well as coverage of other leagues including the NBA G League, Summer League, and the Women's National Basketball Association (WNBA). Regular hosts for local studio programming include David Amber, Sherman Hamilton, Matt Devlin, Leo Rautins and Jack Armstrong. The channel broadcasts NBA games sourced from NBA TV and ESPN, and NBA TV series and studio programs.

NBA TV Canada does not broadcast live Raptors games outside of the pre-season (which are split between the networks of Sportsnet—which is owned by the majority owner of MLSE, Rogers Communications—and TSN), but does broadcast full and abbreviated encores of Raptors telecasts.
