= 2021 WNBA season =

- Official logo used for the WNBA's 25th season
- League: Women's National Basketball Association
- Sport: Basketball
- Duration: May 14 – October 17, 2021
- Games: 32
- Teams: 12
- Total attendance: 434,906
- Average attendance: 2,636
- TV partner(s): ABC, ESPN, ESPN2, CBS, CBSSN, NBA TV

Draft
- Top draft pick: (United States) Charli Collier
- Picked by: Dallas Wings

Regular season
- Top seed: Connecticut Sun
- Season MVP: (The Bahamas) / (Bosnia and Herzegovina) Jonquel Jones (Connecticut)
- Top scorer: (United States) Tina Charles (Washington)

Playoffs
- Finals champions: Chicago Sky
- Runners-up: Phoenix Mercury
- Finals MVP: (United States) Kahleah Copper (Chicago)

WNBA seasons
- ← 2020 2022 →

The 2021 WNBA season was the 25th season of the Women's National Basketball Association (WNBA). The Seattle Storm were the defending champions. In the playoffs, the Chicago Sky won in four games over the Phoenix Mercury. Due to the COVID-19 pandemic, teams played a 32-game season (rather than the 36 games agreed to in the original 2020 season schedule) that included mini two-game series to reduce travel. The regular season ran from May 14 to September 19, with a break from July 12 to August 11 for the Olympic Games.

This season also marked the launch of the WNBA Commissioner's Cup, which had been intended to start in the 2020 season but was delayed due to COVID-19. The first home game and first away game for each team against each of its conference opponents doubled as Cup games; all such games were played before the league took its Olympic break. The Cup final, officially called the Commissioner's Cup Championship Game, featured the conference leaders in the Cup standings and was held on August 12, three days before the rest of the league resumed play, at the Footprint Center in Phoenix, Arizona. A prize pool of $500,000 was provided for the Cup, with players on the winning team guaranteed a minimum bonus of $30,000 and those of the losing team guaranteed $10,000, and the championship game MVP receiving an extra $5,000. The Seattle Storm defeated the Connecticut Sun 79-57 to win the inaugural cup. Breanna Stewart was named MVP of the game.

The season had 100 games broadcast on national networks, including 25 across ABC and ESPN networks, 40 on CBS networks, and 35 on NBA TV. The remainder of games were broadcast on local networks and the WNBA's League Pass service; several games were also streamed on Twitter, Amazon Prime, and Oculus.

This season saw Wilson take over as the league's ball supplier. Spalding previously held the contract for the league's first 24 seasons.

== Draft ==
The New York Liberty won the first pick in the 2021 WNBA draft in the draft lottery, but the pick was later traded to the Dallas Wings who picked Charli Collier.

== Transactions ==
=== Retirement ===
- On February 8, 2021, Crystal Langhorne announced her retirement after thirteen seasons of playing in the WNBA. She won the 2018 and 2020 WNBA titles with the Seattle Storm. Langhorne was a two-time All-Star and won the Most Improved Player Award in 2009. She announced her retirement to become the Storm's Director of Community Engagement.
- On February 9, 2021, Renee Montgomery announced her retirement after eleven seasons of playing in the WNBA. She won the 2015 and 2017 WNBA titles with the Minnesota Lynx. Montgomery won the WNBA Sixth Woman of the Year award in 2012 and was a two-time All-Star.
- On March 8, 2021, LaToya Sanders announced her retirement after nine seasons playing in the WNBA. She won the 2019 WNBA title with the Washington Mystics.
- On March 15, 2021, Morgan Tuck announced her retirement after five seasons playing in the WNBA. She won the 2020 WNBA title with the Seattle Storm.
- On May 13, 2021, Seimone Augustus announced her retirement after fifteen seasons playing in the WNBA. She was a four time WNBA Champion, eight time WNBA All-Star, one time WNBA Finals MVP, and she won WNBA Rookie of the Year in her rookie season. In addition to her decorated WNBA career she spent time playing overseas in Russia and Turkey, where she won the EuroCup twice and Turkish Cup once. Augustus joined the Los Angeles Sparks coaching staff.

=== Free agency ===
Free agency negotiations started on January 15, 2021, and the signing period began on February 1, 2021.

=== Coaching changes ===
Off-season
Team	2020 season	2021 season	Reference
Dallas Wings	Brian Agler	Vickie Johnson	
Atlanta Dream	Nicki Collen	Mike Petersen (interim)	
Mid-season
Team	Departing Coach	New Coach	Reference
Seattle Storm	Dan Hughes	Noelle Quinn	
Atlanta Dream	Mike Petersen (interim)	Darius Taylor (interim)	

== Regular season ==
=== All-Star Game ===
ESPN, TSN3/5/SN

July 14, 2021
7:00 p.m. ET

Recap

Team USA 85, Team WNBA 93
Scoring by quarter: 28–25, 15–19, 23–22, 19–27
Pts: Brittney Griner 17; Rebs: Sylvia Fowles 7 Asts: Sue Bird 8	Pts: Arike Ogunbowale 26; Rebs: Jonquel Jones 14; Asts: Courtney Vandersloot 7

Michelob Ultra Arena, Las Vegas, Nevada
Attendance: 5,175
Referees: Kurt Walker, Jeffrey Smith, Angelica Suffern

=== Standings ===
#	Team	W	L	PCT	GB	Conf.	Home	Road	Cup
1	x – Connecticut Sun	26	6	.813	–	12–3	15–1	11–5	9–1
2	x – Las Vegas Aces	24	8	.750	2	11–4	13–3	11–5	6–4
3	x – Minnesota Lynx	22	10	.688	4	10–5	13–3	9–7	7–3
4	x – Seattle Storm	21	11	.656	5	9–6	11–5	10–6	8–2
5	x – Phoenix Mercury	19	13	.594	7	6–9	7–9	12–4	5–5
6	x – Chicago Sky	16	16	.500	10	10–5	6–10	10–6	6–4
7	x – Dallas Wings	14	18	.438	12	7–8	7–9	7–9	3–7
8	x – New York Liberty	12	20	.375	14	6–9	7–9	5–11	5–5
9	e – Washington Mystics	12	20	.375	14	7–8	8–8	4–12	4–6
10	e – Los Angeles Sparks	12	20	.375	14	2–13	8–8	4–12	1–9
11	e – Atlanta Dream	8	24	.250	18	6–9	4–12	4–12	4–6
12	e – Indiana Fever	6	26	.188	20	4–11	4–12	2–14	2–8

Notes

(#) – League Standing
x – Clinched playoff berth
e – Eliminated from playoff contention
Source: Overall standings and Commissioner's Cup Standings

=== Schedule ===
2021 WNBA preseason
Preseason

Date	Time (ET)	Matchup			TV	Result	High points	High rebounds	High assists	High blocks	Location
Thursday, April 15	7:00 p.m.	2021 WNBA draft			USA: ESPN; Canada: TSN2						Virtually
Saturday, May 1	3:00 p.m.	Minnesota Lynx	@	Atlanta Dream	N/A	61–69	Tied (12)	Billings (7)	C. Williams (5)	Tied (2)	Gateway Center Arena
Sunday, May 2	3:00 p.m.	Los Angeles Sparks	@	Las Vegas Aces	N/A	80–71	Scrimmage				Michelob Ultra Arena
Wednesday, May 5	7:00 p.m.	Atlanta Dream	@	Washington Mystics	N/A	87–80	T. Charles (18)	Alleyne (12)	Cloud (3)	5 tied (1)	Entertainment and Sports Arena
Saturday, May 8	12:00 p.m.	Connecticut Sun	@	Dallas Wings	N/A	89–76	B. Jones (22)	C. Collier (10)	Goodman (5)	Tied (2)	College Park Center
Saturday, May 8	2:00 p.m.	Washington Mystics	@	Minnesota Lynx	N/A	68–78	Banham (23)	Shepard (10)	Achonwa (5)	Alleyne (3)	Target Center
Saturday, May 8	4:00 p.m.	Las Vegas Aces	@	Los Angeles Sparks	N/A	85–85	Walker (23)	Tied (9)	Tied (5)	Tied (3)	Los Angeles Convention Center
Saturday, May 8	6:00 p.m.	Seattle Storm	@	Phoenix Mercury	N/A	88–71	Magbegor (17)	A. Smith (8)	Canada (6)	Magbegor (3)	Phoenix Suns Arena; 1,985
Sunday, May 9	1:00 p.m.	Chicago Sky	@	Indiana Fever	N/A	65–82	Tied (16)	McCwoan (12)	T. Mitchell (4)	4 tied (1)	Bankers Life Fieldhouse
Tuesday, May 11	4:30 p.m.	Indiana Fever	@	Chicago Sky	N/A	70–83	Vivians (15)	Tied (6)	Boyd-Jones (5)	4 tied (1)	Wintrust Arena

2021 WNBA regular season
May

Date	Time (ET)	Matchup			TV	Result	High points	High rebounds	High assists	High blocks	Location
Friday, May 14
Friday, May 14	7:00 p.m.	Indiana Fever	@	New York Liberty	USA: NBA TV, YES; Canada: SN1	87–90	Laney (30)	McCowan (16)	Ionescu (11)	McCowan (2)	Barclays Center; 1,139
Friday, May 14	7:30 p.m.	Connecticut Sun	@	Atlanta Dream	Twitter	78–67	J. Jones (26)	Tied (8)	Bonner (5)	Billings (4)	Gateway Center Arena; 561
Friday, May 14	9:00 p.m.	Phoenix Mercury	@	Minnesota Lynx	CBSSN	77–55	Tied (18)	Griner (12)	Tied (5)	3 Tied (3)	Target Center; 2,021
Friday, May 14	10:30 p.m.	Dallas Wings	@	Los Angeles Sparks	Facebook	94–71	A. Gray (23)	Thornton (11)	Harris (7)	Coffey (2)	Los Angeles Convention Center; No Fans
Saturday, May 15
Saturday, May 15	1:00 p.m.	Chicago Sky	@	Washington Mystics	USA: ABC; Canada: TSN5	70–56	Copper (19)	Tied (8)	DeShields (5)	Parker (3)	Entertainment and Sports Arena; 1,050
Saturday, May 15	3:00 p.m.	Las Vegas Aces	@	Seattle Storm	USA: ABC; Canada: SN1	83–97	Stewart (28)	Stewart (13)	Bird (8)	Tied (2)	Angel of the Winds Arena; 1,031
Sunday, May 16
Sunday, May 16	2:00 p.m.	New York Liberty	@	Indiana Fever	CBSSN	73–65	Laney (20)	Lavender (15)	Robinson (5)	Tied (2)	Bankers Life Fieldhouse; No Fans
Sunday, May 16	7:00 p.m.	Phoenix Mercury	@	Connecticut Sun	CBSSN	78–86	Bonner (27)	J. Jones (13)	January (6)	Griner (4)	Mohegan Sun Arena; 2,042
Tuesday, May 18	7:00 p.m.	Minnesota Lynx	@	New York Liberty	ESPN3	75–86	Tied (26)	Fowles (11)	Ionescu (12)	Powers (2)	Barclays Center; 815
Tuesday, May 18	8:00 p.m.	Phoenix Mercury	@	Washington Mystics	USA: ESPN2; Canada: TSN5	91–70	T. Charles (22)	Turner (14)	L. Mitchell (7)	Tied (2)	Entertainment and Sports Arena; 1,050
Tuesday, May 18	10:00 p.m.	Las Vegas Aces	@	Seattle Storm	USA: ESPN2; Canada: TSN5	96–80	Stewart (26)	Magbegor (13)	C. Gray (7)	Tied (3)	Angel of the Winds Arena; 1,001
Wednesday, May 19
Wednesday, May 19	7:00 p.m.	Chicago Sky	@	Atlanta Dream	Facebook, WCIU	85–77	C. Williams (24)	Ndour (11)	Vandersloot (8)	3 tied (3)	Gateway Center Arena; 689
Wednesday, May 19	7:00 p.m.	Indiana Fever	@	Connecticut Sun	CBSSN	67–88	Hiedeman (19)	J. Jones (11)	Hiedeman (6)	McCowan (3)	Mohegan Sun Arena; 2,084
Thursday, May 20
Thursday, May 20	8:00 p.m.	Seattle Storm	@	Minnesota Lynx	USA: NBA TV, JoeTV; Canada: TSN1/5	90–78	Loyd (23)	Fowles (9)	Bird (8)	7 tied (1)	Target Center; 1,934
Friday, May 21
Friday, May 21	7:00 p.m.	Atlanta Dream	@	Indiana Fever	Twitter	83–79	Carter (23)	Breland (16)	T. Mitchell (6)	3 tied (2)	Bankers Life Fieldhouse
Friday, May 21	7:00 p.m.	New York Liberty	@	Washington Mystics	USA: NBC Sports Washington, YES; Canada: NBA TV Canada	72–101	T. Charles (34)	T. Charles (13)	Cloud (8)	Atkins (2)	Entertainment and Sports Arena
Friday, May 21	10:00 p.m.	Connecticut Sun	@	Phoenix Mercury	Facebook	84–67	Diggins-Smith (20)	J. Jones (11)	Bonner (5)	Griner (4)	Phoenix Suns Arena; 4,101
Friday, May 21	10:30 p.m.	Los Angeles Sparks	@	Las Vegas Aces	CBSSN, MyLVTV, Spectrum SportsNet	69–97	N. Ogwumike (19)	Tied (10)	C. Gray (6)	Tied (3)	Michelob Ultra Arena; 1,972
Saturday, May 22
Saturday, May 22	8:00 p.m.	Seattle Storm	@	Dallas Wings	Facebook, Bally Sports Southwest Plus, JoeTV	100–97 (OT)	Stewart (36)	Thornton (12)	Tied (6)	Stewart (5)	College Park Center; 1,491
Sunday, May 23
Sunday, May 23	1:00 p.m.	New York Liberty	@	Chicago Sky	USA: ESPN; Canada: NBA TV Canada	93–85	DeShields (22)	Hebard (10)	Vandersloot (16)	Hebard (4)	Wintrust Arena; 1,332
Sunday, May 23	1:00 p.m.	Washington Mystics	@	Indiana Fever	ESPN3	77–89	T. Charles (31)	Tied (10)	Robinson (6)	Breland (2)	Bankers Life Fieldhouse; No Fans
Sunday, May 23	6:00 p.m.	Connecticut Sun	@	Las Vegas Aces	Facebook, MyLVTV	72–65	Bonner (22)	J. Jones (11)	Tied (5)	Cambage (4)	Michelob Ultra Arena; 1,954
Monday, May 24	7:00 p.m.	Dallas Wings	@	New York Liberty	USA: Twitter, YES; Canada: TSN3	81–88	Laney (26)	Thornton (11)	Harris (7)	4 tied (1)	Barclays Center; 894
Tuesday, May 25
Tuesday, May 25	7:00 p.m.	Washington Mystics	@	Indiana Fever	Monumental	85–69	T. Charles (30)	Hines-Allen (10)	Cloud (7)	Breland (2)	Bankers Life Fieldhouse; No Fans
Tuesday, May 25	8:00 p.m.	Atlanta Dream	@	Chicago Sky	CBSSN, WCIU	90–83	Hayes (26)	Tied (9)	Vandersloot (6)	3 tied (2)	Wintrust Arena; 1,004
Tuesday, May 25	10:00 p.m.	Connecticut Sun	@	Seattle Storm	CBSSN, JoeTV, NESN+	87–90 (OT)	J. Jones (28)	J. Jones (13)	J. Thomas (6)	4 tied (2)	Angel of the Winds Arena; 1,011
Wednesday, May 26
Wednesday, May 26	10:00 p.m.	Las Vegas Aces	@	Phoenix Mercury	CBSSN, MyLVTV	85–79	Tied (27)	Griner (11)	Diggins-Smith (11)	Turner (4)	Phoenix Suns Arena; 4,082
Thursday, May 27	7:00 p.m.	Dallas Wings	@	Atlanta Dream	USA: Bally Sports South, Bally Sports South Plus; Canada: NBA TV Canada	95–101	Hayes (26)	Billings (11)	C. Williams (5)	4 tied (1)	Gateway Center Arena; 711
Friday, May 28
Friday, May 28	7:00 p.m.	Washington Mystics	@	Connecticut Sun	Facebook	81–86	T. Charles (29)	J. Jones (12)	J. Jones (5)	T. Charles (3)	Mohegan Sun Arena; 2,102
Friday, May 28	8:00 p.m.	Los Angeles Sparks	@	Chicago Sky	CBSSN, WCIU, Spectrum SportsNet	76–61	Tied (14)	Tied (9)	Tied (6)	6 tied (1)	Wintrust Arena; 1,124
Friday, May 28	10:00 p.m.	Minnesota Lynx	@	Seattle Storm	CBSSN, JoeTV	72–82	Tied (15)	Stewart (8)	N. Collier (6)	Tied (2)	Angel of the Winds Arena; 1,332
Friday, May 28	10:30 p.m.	Indiana Fever	@	Las Vegas Aces	Twitter, MyLVTV	77–113	Hamby (25)	McCowan (10)	C. Gray (12)	Wilson (2)	Michelob Ultra Arena; No Fans
Saturday, May 29
Saturday, May 29	2:00 p.m.	Atlanta Dream	@	New York Liberty	Amazon Prime Video	90–87	C. Williams (31)	C. Williams (12)	Laney (11)	Tied (2)	Barclays Center; 1,235
Saturday, May 29	8:00 p.m.	Phoenix Mercury	@	Dallas Wings	USA: Bally Sports South Plus; Canada: TSN5	89–85	Griner (27)	Griner (16)	Diggins-Smith (7)	Turner (4)	College Park Center; 1,717
Sunday, May 30
Sunday, May 30	6:00 p.m.	Los Angeles Sparks	@	Chicago Sky	Facebook, WCIU, Spectrum SportsNet	82–79	Vandersloot (28)	Ndour-Fall (12)	Tied (7)	Zahui B (3)	Wintrust Arena; 1,124
Sunday, May 30	6:00 p.m.	Indiana Fever	@	Las Vegas Aces	MyLVTV	78–101	Hamby (22)	Cambage (13)	C. Gray (5)	Cambage (5)	Michelob Ultra Arena; 1,981
Sunday, May 30	7:00 p.m.	Connecticut Sun	@	Minnesota Lynx	USA: Bally Sports North, NESN; Canada: SN1/SN360, NBA TV Canada	74–79 (OT)	Fowles (24)	Fowles (9)	4 tied (5)	Fowles (3)	Target Center; 2,007

June

Date	Time (ET)	Matchup			TV	Result	High points	High rebounds	High assists	High blocks	Location
Tuesday, June 1	7:00 p.m.	Las Vegas Aces	@	Connecticut Sun	ESPN3, NESN+, MyLVTV	67–74	Cambage (28)	Tied (8)	Tied (6)	Tied (3)	Mohegan Sun Arena; No Fans
Tuesday, June 1	8:00 p.m.	Los Angeles Sparks	@	Dallas Wings	ESPN3, Bally Sports Southwest Plus	69–79	Harris (18)	3 tied (7)	Mabrey (6)	Coffey (6)	College Park Center; 1,372
Tuesday, June 1	8:30 p.m.	Phoenix Mercury	@	Chicago Sky	USA: ESPN; Canada: TSN3	84–83	DeShields (26)	Hebard (9)	Vandersloot (10)	Turner (3)	Wintrust Arena; 1,217
Tuesday, June 1	10:30 p.m.	Indiana Fever	@	Seattle Storm	USA: ESPN2; Canada: TSN3	73–88	Stewart (28)	McCowan (14)	Bird (8)	McCowan (3)	Angel of the Winds Arena; 1,215
Thursday, June 3	8:00 p.m.	Las Vegas Aces	@	New York Liberty	USA: YES, MyLVTV; Canada: TSN1	94–82	Wilson (30)	Tied (13)	Tied (9)	Wilson (3)	Barclays Center; 1,389
Thursday, June 3	10:00 p.m.	Chicago Sky	@	Phoenix Mercury	CBSSN, WCIU	74–77	Diggins-Smith (28)	Griner (12)	Vandersloot (9)	Griner (4)	Phoenix Suns Arena; 3,819
Thursday, June 3	10:30 p.m.	Indiana Fever	@	Los Angeles Sparks	USA: Spectrum Sportsnet, Canada: NBA TV Canada	63–98	Toliver (22)	Robinson (8)	Tied (5)	Tied (2)	Los Angeles Convention Center; 301
Friday, June 4	8:00 p.m.	Atlanta Dream	@	Minnesota Lynx	Facebook	84–86	N. Collier (26)	Fowles (11)	Sims (6)	Tied (1)	Target Center; 2,024
Friday, June 4	10:00 p.m.	Dallas Wings	@	Seattle Storm	Amazon Prime Video, JoeTV	102–105 (OT)	Loyd (25)	Tied (9)	Bird (10)	Tied (2)	Angel of the Winds Arena; 1,467
Saturday, June 5	1:00 p.m.	Las Vegas Aces	@	Washington Mystics	USA: ABC; Canada: SN360	96–93	Cambage (24)	Wilson (15)	C. Gray (8)	Young (1)	Entertainment and Sports Arena; 2,100
Saturday, June 5	3:00 p.m.	Chicago Sky	@	Los Angeles Sparks	USA: ABC; Canada: SN360	63–68	Wheeler (22)	Zahui B (10)	Wheeler (5)	Zahui B (4)	Los Angeles Convention Center; 430
Saturday, June 5	7:00 p.m.	New York Liberty	@	Connecticut Sun	USA: NESN, YES; Canada: SN1	64–85	J. Jones (31)	J. Jones (13)	J. Thomas (9)	3 Tied (1)	Mohegan Sun Arena; 2,118
Sunday, June 6	7:00 p.m.	Atlanta Dream	@	Minnesota Lynx	USA: Bally Sports North, Bally Sports Southeast; Canada: TSN3	80–100	Hayes (21)	Fowles (7)	N. Collier (6)	Tied (1)	Target Center; 2,021
Sunday, June 6	7:00 p.m.	Dallas Wings	@	Seattle Storm	JoeTV	68–67	Loyd (25)	Harrison (8)	Bird (5)	Tied (2)	Angel of the Winds Arena; 1,930
Tuesday, June 8	7:00 p.m.	Minnesota Lynx	@	Washington Mystics	USA: Twitter, NBC Sports Washington; Canada: NBA TV Canada	81–85	T. Charles (31)	N. Collier (9)	Cloud (9)	Hines-Allen (3)	Entertainment and Sports Arena; 2,100
Tuesday, June 8	10:00 p.m.	Dallas Wings	@	Phoenix Mercury	CBSSN, Bally Sports Arizona, Bally Sports Southwest	85–81	Griner (27)	Griner (16)	Harris (7)	3 tied (2)	Phoenix Suns Arena; 3,618
Wednesday, June 9	7:00 p.m.	Seattle Storm	@	Atlanta Dream	USA: Bally Sports Southeast, JoeTV; Canada: TSN4	95–71	Hayes (22)	E. Williams (12)	Canada (7)	Stewart (2)	Gateway Center Arena; 1,014
Wednesday, June 9	8:00 p.m.	Indiana Fever	@	Chicago Sky	CBSSN, WCIU	76–92	K. Mitchell (24)	Tied (9)	Vandersloot (9)	Breland (4)	Wintrust Arena; 1,090
Thursday, June 10	7:00 p.m.	Los Angeles Sparks	@	Washington Mystics	CBSSN, NBC Sports Washington, Spectrum Sportsnet	71–89	Atkins (23)	T. Charles (10)	Cloud (5)	Plaisance (4)	Entertainment and Sports Arena; 2,100
Friday, June 11	8:00 p.m.	Seattle Storm	@	Atlanta Dream	CBSSN, JoeTV	86–75	Loyd (20)	Stewart (13)	Bird (7)	Tied (1)	Gateway Center Arena; 1,405
Friday, June 11	10:00 p.m.	Dallas Wings	@	Phoenix Mercury		77–59	Ogunbowale (20)	Alarie (9)	Diggins-Smith (5)	Diggins-Smith (3)	Phoenix Suns Arena; 4,261
Saturday, June 12
Saturday, June 12	1:00 p.m.	Chicago Sky	@	Indiana Fever	Amazon Prime Video, WCIU	83–79	Tied (20)	Parker (20)	L. Allen (6)	3 tied (2)	Indiana Farmers Coliseum; No Fans
Saturday, June 12	8:00 p.m.	Los Angeles Sparks	@	Minnesota Lynx	USA: Bally Sports North; Canada: NBA TV Canada	64–80	Cooper (17)	Fowles (9)	Toliver (5)	Fowles (4)	Target Center; 2,203
Sunday, June 13	2:00 p.m.	Seattle Storm	@	Connecticut Sun	Facebook, JoeTV	89–66	Stewart (22)	Stewart (9)	Stewart (5)	Magbegor (3)	Mohegan Sun Arena; 2,248
Sunday, June 13	3:30 p.m.	Washington Mystics	@	Atlanta Dream	USA: NBA TV, Bally Sports South; Canada: TSN2	78–101	C. Williams (21)	Tied (7)	Tied (6)	T. Charles (3)	Gateway Center Arena; 1,122
Sunday, June 13	6:00 p.m.	Dallas Wings	@	Las Vegas Aces	MyLVTV, Bally Sports Southwest Plus	78–85	Wilson (28)	Wilson (14)	Ogunbowale (8)	Tied (2)	Michelob Ultra Arena; No Fans
Sunday, June 13	6:00 p.m.	New York Liberty	@	Phoenix Mercury	USA: Bally Sports Arizona Plus, YES; Canada: TSN2	85–83	Griner (29)	Griner (14)	Laney (10)	Griner (2)	Phoenix Suns Arena; 4,476
Tuesday, June 15	7:00 p.m.	Seattle Storm	@	Indiana Fever	JoeTV	87–70	K. Mitchell (26)	Stewart (12)	Canada (6))	Breland (3)	Indiana Farmers Coliseum; No Fans
Tuesday, June 15	9:00 p.m.	Chicago Sky	@	Minnesota Lynx	USA: ESPN2; Canada: NBA TV Canada	105–89	N. Collier (27)	Fowles (9)	Vandersloot (13)	5 tied (1)	Target Center; 2,024
Tuesday, June 15	10:00 p.m.	New York Liberty	@	Las Vegas Aces	ESPN3, MyLVTV	78–100	Plum (32)	Cambage (11)	Laney (6)	6 tied (1)	Michelob Ultra Arena; 2,115
Wednesday, June 16
Wednesday, June 16	10:30 p.m.	Phoenix Mercury	@	Los Angeles Sparks	Amazon Prime Video, Spectrum Sportsnet	80–85	Griner (30)	Turner (12)	Tied (10)	Tied (2)	Los Angeles Convention Center; 514
Thursday, June 17	7:00 p.m.	Seattle Storm	@	Indiana Fever	Facebook, JoeTV	79–69	Stewart (21)	Stewart (15)	Bird (7)	Breland (4)	Indiana Farmers Coliseum; No Fans
Thursday, June 17	7:00 p.m.	Atlanta Dream	@	Washington Mystics	USA: NBC Sports Washington; Canada: TSN2	93–96	Plaisanace (25)	Tied (9)	Cloud (11)	Tied (2)	Entertainment and Sports Arena; 2,100
Thursday, June 17	8:00 p.m.	Connecticut Sun	@	Chicago Sky	Twitter	75–81	J. Thomas (20)	B. Jones (12)	Vandersloot (10)	Bonner (3)	Wintrust Arena; 1,293
Thursday, June 17	8:00 p.m.	Minnesota Lynx	@	Dallas Wings	CBSSN	85–73	McBride (22)	Fowles (12)	Clarendon (5)	N. Coller (2)	College Park Center; 1,519
Thursday, June 17	10:00 p.m.	New York Liberty	@	Las Vegas Aces	CBSSN	76–103	Laney (20)	Hamby (12)	Plum (7)	Tied (2)	Michelob Ultra Arena; No Fans
Friday, June 18	10:30 p.m.	Phoenix Mercury	@	Los Angeles Sparks	CBSSN	80–66	Diggins-Smith (21)	Tied (8)	Tied (4)	Tied (2)	Los Angeles Convention Center; 520
Saturday, June 19	2:00 p.m.	Connecticut Sun	@	Chicago Sky	CBS	81–91	B. Jones (22)	Copper (9)	Vandersloot (11)	Parker (3)	Wintrust Arena; 1,293
Saturday, June 19	7:00 p.m.	Indiana Fever	@	Washington Mystics	USA: NBC Sports Washington; Canada: NBA TV Canada	77–82	T. Charles (30)	T. Charles (15)	Robinson (6)	Tied (2)	Entertainment and Sports Arena; 2,100
Saturday, June 19	8:00 p.m.	Minnesota Lynx	@	Dallas Wings	USA: Bally Sports Southwest Plus, Bally Sports North Plus; Canada: TSN2	77–95	Mabrey (28)	Alarie (8)	Tied (6)	Fowles (2)	College Park Center; 1,751
Sunday, June 20	4:00 p.m.	New York Liberty	@	Los Angeles Sparks	USA: ESPN; Canada: SN360	76–73	Wheeler (20)	Whitcomb (9)	Wheeler (10)	R. Allen (3)	Los Angeles Convention Center; 731
Tuesday, June 22	7:00 p.m.	Dallas Wings	@	Connecticut Sun	USA: League Pass; Canada: TSN3/5	70–80	B. Jones (26)	Bonner (13)	Bonner (6)	Tied (2)	Mohegan Sun Arena; 2,076
Tuesday, June 22	7:00 p.m.	Chicago Sky	@	New York Liberty	Amazon Prime Video, WCIU	92–72	Parker (23)	Parker (12)	Vandersloot (10)	3 tied (2)	Barclays Center; 1,419
Tuesday, June 22	10:00 p.m.	Washington Mystics	@	Seattle Storm	JoeTV, Monmumental	87–83	T. Charles (34)	T. Charles (16)	Loyd (9)	Stewart (5)	Angel of the Winds Arena; 2,495
Wednesday, June 23	7:00 p.m.	Minnesota Lynx	@	Atlanta Dream	USA: Bally Sports Southeast Extra, Bally Sports North Plus; Canada: TSN5	87–85	Fowles (26)	Fowles (19)	Clarendon (9)	Fowles (5)	Gateway Center Arena; 907
Thursday, June 24	7:00 p.m.	Dallas Wings	@	Indiana Fever	CBSSN	89–64	K. Mitchell (24)	Sabally (9)	Ogunbowale (5)	Sabally (2)	Indiana Farmers Coliseum; No Fans
Thursday, June 24	7:00 p.m.	Chicago Sky	@	New York Liberty	USA: Twitter, YES, WCIU; Canada: NBA TV Canada	91–68	Tied (18)	Parker (11)	Vandersloot (9)	Onyenwere (3)	Barclays Center; 2,148
Thursday, June 24	10:30 p.m.	Washington Mystics	@	Los Angeles Sparks	USA: Spectrum Sportsnet, Monumental; Canada: NBA TV Canada	82–89	Tied (26)	T. Charles (10)	Atkins (7)	3 tied (2)	Los Angeles Convention Center; 520
Friday, June 25
Friday, June 25	8:00 p.m.	Las Vegas Aces	@	Minnesota Lynx	Facebook, MyLVTV	89–90 (OT)	Fowles (30)	Cambage (20)	Tied (7)	Fowles (4)	Target Center; 2,734
Saturday, June 26	1:00 p.m.	Washington Mystics	@	Dallas Wings	CBS	74–85	Ogunbowale (30)	T. Charles (10)	L. Mitchell (7)	Sabally (2)	College Park Center; 2,055
Saturday, June 26	7:00 p.m.	New York Liberty	@	Atlanta Dream	USA: Bally Sports South, YES; Canada: SN360	101–78	Whitcomb (30)	Shook (11)	Ionescu (8)	Stokes (2)	Gateway Center Arena; 1,605
Sunday, June 27
Sunday, June 27	2:00 p.m.	Chicago Sky	@	Connecticut Sun	NESN+, WCIU	58–74	Bonner (23)	Mompremier (11)	Vandersloot (7)	Dolson (2)	Mohegan Sun Arena; 2,014
Sunday, June 27	4:00 p.m.	Seattle Storm	@	Las Vegas Aces	USA: ESPN; Canada: SN360	92–95 (OT)	Stewart (35)	3 tied (11)	C. Gray (7)	Stewart (3)	Michelob Ultra Arena; 3,766
Sunday, June 27	6:00 p.m.	Los Angeles Sparks	@	Phoenix Mercury	Facebook, Bally Sports Arizona Plus	79–88	Taurasi (25)	Griner (15)	3 tied (4)	Griner (2)	Phoenix Suns Arena; 7,304
Tuesday, June 29	7:00 p.m.	New York Liberty	@	Atlanta Dream	USA: ESPN3, Bally Sports Southeast; Canada: NBA TV Canada	69–73	C. Williams (18)	Shook (8)	Laney (7)	Tied (2)	Gateway Center Arena; 1,131
Tuesday, June 29	7:00 p.m.	Connecticut Sun	@	Washington Mystics	USA: ESPN2; Canada: TSN3	90–71	T. Charles (26)	J. Jones (16)	Bonner (7)	T. Charles (3)	Entertainment and Sports Arena; 2,100
Wednesday, June 30	8:00 p.m.	Chicago Sky	@	Dallas Wings	CBSSN, Bally Sports Southwest Plus, WCIU	91–81	Harrison (23)	Parker (10)	Vandersloot (12)	Tied (2)	College Park Center; 1,778
Wednesday, June 30	10:00 p.m.	Minnesota Lynx	@	Phoenix Mercury	CBSSN, Bally Sports Arizona, Bally Sports North Plus	82–76	Griner (28)	Tied (11)	Tied (7)	Fowles (2)	Phoenix Suns Arena; 4,122
Wednesday, June 30	10:30 p.m.	Las Vegas Aces	@	Los Angeles Sparks	Amazon Prime Video, Spectrum Sportsnet, MyLVTV	99–75	Zahui B (22)	Cambage (11)	Gray (8)	Tied (2)	Los Angeles Convention Center; 746

July

Date	Time (ET)	Matchup			TV	Result	High points	High rebounds	High assists	High blocks	Location
Thursday, July 1
Thursday, July 1	7:00 p.m.	Connecticut Sun	@	Indiana Fever	Amazon Prime Video, NESN	86–80	B. Jones (34)	McCowan (8)	Tied (7)	J. Jones (2)	Indiana Farmers Coliseum; No Fans
Friday, July 2	8:00 p.m.	Chicago Sky	@	Dallas Wings	CBSSN, Bally Sports Southwest Plus, WCIU	91–100	Mabrey (28)	Sabally (9)	Vandersloot (9)	Sabally (3)	College Park Center; 2,187
Friday, July 2	10:00 p.m.	Las Vegas Aces	@	Los Angeles Sparks	CBSSN, Spectrum Sportsnet, MyLVTV	66–58	Wilson (20)	Zahui B (12)	Wheeler (5)	Coffey (4)	Los Angeles Convention Center; 959
Friday, July 2	10:00 p.m.	Atlanta Dream	@	Seattle Storm	Twitter, JoeTV	88–91	C. Williams (20)	Tied (8)	Tied (7)	Stewart (3)	Angel of the Winds Arena; 3,011
Saturday, July 3	1:00 p.m.	Connecticut Sun	@	Indiana Fever	USA: NBA TV, NESN+ Canada: SN1	67–73	Robinson (19)	McCowan (12)	Tied (4)	Breland (3)	Indiana Farmers Coliseum; No Fans
Saturday, July 3	1:00 p.m.	Washington Mystics	@	New York Liberty	CBSSN, YES, Monumental	79–82	T. Charles (31)	T. Charles (16)	Tied (5)	T. Charles (3)	Barclays Center; 1,615
Saturday, July 3	10:00 p.m.	Minnesota Lynx	@	Phoenix Mercury	Facebook, Bally Sports Arizona Plus, Bally Sports North Plus	99–68	McBride (24)	Fowles (10)	Tied (6)	Fowles (3)	Phoenix Suns Arena; 8,182
Sunday, July 4	6:00 p.m.	Atlanta Dream	@	Las Vegas Aces	USA: NBA TV, MyLVTV, Canada: TSN5	95–118	Plum (23)	Tied (10)	Sims (13)	3 tied (1)	Michelob Ultra Arena; 2,705
Sunday, July 4	9:00 p.m.	Seattle Storm	@	Los Angeles Sparks	USA: NBA TV, Antenna TV; Canada: SN360	84–74	Stewart (21)	Sykes (10)	3 tied (5)	Zahui B (3)	Los Angeles Convention Center; 716
Monday, July 5	7:00 p.m.	Dallas Wings	@	New York Liberty	Facebook, YES	96–99	Whitcomb (26)	Shook (8)	Ionescu (12)	Sabally (3)	Barclays Center; 1,677
Wednesday, July 7
Wednesday, July 7	8:00 p.m.	Dallas Wings	@	Minnesota Lynx	USA: ESPN2; Canada: NBA TV Canada	79–85	McBride (25)	Fowles (11)	Clarendon (8)	Collier (4)	Target Center; 2,321
Wednesday, July 7	10:00 p.m.	Phoenix Mercury	@	Las Vegas Aces	Amazon Prime Video, MyLVTV	99–90 (OT)	Griner (33)	Tied (12)	Diggins-Smith (8)	Griner (3)	Michelob Ultra Arena; 3,013
Wednesday, July 7	10:00 p.m.	Los Angeles Sparks	@	Seattle Storm	CBSSN, Antenna TV	62–71	Stewart (27)	Stewart (11)	Bird (5)	Tied (2)	Angel of the Winds Arena; 2,730
Friday, July 9
Friday, July 9	7:00 p.m.	Atlanta Dream	@	Connecticut Sun	CBSSN, NESN+	72–84	J. Jones (24)	J. Jones (16)	Hiedeman (5)	E. Williams (2)	Mohegan Sun Arena; 2,286
Friday, July 9	7:00 p.m.	New York Liberty	@	Indiana Fever	USA: NBA TV, YES; Canada: TSN4	69–82	Laney (23)	Laney (8)	Tied (5)	McCowan (4)	Indiana Farmers Coliseum; No Fans
Friday, July 9	9:00 p.m.	Seattle Storm	@	Phoenix Mercury	USA: ESPN; Canada: TSN3/4	77–85	Griner (29)	Griner (15)	Diggins-Smith (6)	Diggins-Smith (2)	Phoenix Suns Arena; 7,554
Friday, July 9	10:30 p.m.	Minnesota Lynx	@	Las Vegas Aces	ESPN3, MyLVTV	77–67	Tied (18)	Stokes (12)	Clarendon (9)	Wilson (3)	Michelob Ultra Arena; No Fans
Saturday, July 10
Saturday, July 10	8:00 p.m.	Washington Mystics	@	Chicago Sky	Amazon Prime Video, WCIU	89–85 (OT)	T. Charles (34)	T. Charles (17)	Vandersloot (15)	Paker (2)	Wintrust Arena; 8,331
Sunday, July 11
Sunday, July 11	1:00 p.m.	Las Vegas Aces	@	Dallas Wings	USA: ABC; Canada: TSN5	95–79	Tied (22)	Wilson (13)	Wilson (8)	Tied (3)	College Park Center; 2,533
Sunday, July 11	2:00 p.m.	Connecticut Sun	@	New York Liberty	USA: ESPN3, NESN+, YES; Canada: SN360	71–54	J. Jones (17)	J. Jones (17)	J. Jones (5)	Tied (1)	Barclays Center; 1,988
Sunday, July 11	5:00 p.m.	Indiana Fever	@	Atlanta Dream	Facebook, Bally Sports Southeast	79–68	McCowan (21)	McCowan (14)	Robinson (9)	McCowan (3)	Gateway Center Arena; 1,897
Sunday, July 11	6:00 p.m.	Phoenix Mercury	@	Seattle Storm	CBSSN, JoeTV	75–82	Nurse (28)	Russell (10)	Peddy (7)	3 tied (1)	Angel of the Winds Arena; 5,110
Sunday, July 11	9:00 p.m.	Minnesota Lynx	@	Los Angeles Sparks	USA: Bally Sports North Plus, Spectrum Sportsnet; Canada: SN360	86–61	N. Collier (27)	Tied (8)	Clarendon (8)	Fowles (3)	Los Angeles Convention Center; 892
Wednesday, July 14	7:00 p.m.	Team USA	@	Team WNBA	USA: ESPN; Canada: TSN3/5, SN	85–93	Ogunbowale (26)	J. Jones (14)	Bird (8)	Tied (2)	Michelob Ultra Arena; 5,175

August

Date	Time (ET)	Matchup			TV	Result	High points	High rebounds	High assists	High blocks	Location
Thursday, August 12
Thursday, August 12	9:00 p.m.	Connecticut Sun	@	Seattle Storm	Amazon Prime Video	57–79	Stewart (17)	J. Jones (11)	Bird (5)	Stewart (3)	Footprint Center; 5,006
Sunday, August 15	4:00 p.m.	Seattle Storm	@	Chicago Sky	ABC	85–87	Loyd (26)	Russell (11)	Vandersloot (11)	Magbegor (3)	Wintrust Arena; 6,231
Sunday, August 15	4:00 p.m.	Connecticut Sun	@	Dallas Wings	ESPN3, Bally Sports Southwest Plus, NESN+	80–59	Ogunbowale (20)	J. Jones (15)	Tied (5)	K. Charles (2)	College Park Center; 2,399
Sunday, August 15	6:00 p.m.	Washington Mystics	@	Las Vegas Aces	MyLVTV, Monumental	83–84	3 tied (20)	Wilson (14)	C. Gray (11)	3 tied (1)	Michelob Ultra Arena; 3,024
Sunday, August 15	6:00 p.m.	Atlanta Dream	@	Phoenix Mercury	CBSSN	81–92	C. Williams (30)	Turner (17)	Diggins-Smith (7)	Turner (4)	Footprint Center; 7,491
Sunday, August 15	7:00 p.m.	New York Liberty	@	Minnesota Lynx	Facebook, YES	78–88	Howard (30)	Fowles (11)	Clarendon (8)	N. Collier (5)	Target Center; 3,534
Sunday, August 15	9:00 p.m.	Indiana Fever	@	Los Angeles Sparks	USA: Spectrum Sportsnet; Canada: SN	70–75	K. Mitchell (20)	Zahui B (9)	Tied (6)	Zahui B (3)	Staples Center; 2,029
Tuesday, August 17	7:00 p.m.	Minnesota Lynx	@	Connecticut Sun	Amazon Prime Video, NESN+	60–72	J. Thomas (19)	J. Jones (13)	J. Thomas (5)	4 tied (1)	Mohegan Sun Arena; 3,488
Tuesday, August 17	8:00 p.m.	Dallas Wings	@	Chicago Sky	CBSSN, WCIU	80–76	Quigley (27)	Thornton (10)	Vandersloot (12)	Dolson	Wintrust Arena; 3,902
Tuesday, August 17	10:00 p.m.	Washington Mystics	@	Las Vegas Aces	CBSSN, MyLVTV	83–93	T. Charles (30)	Wilson (14)	Cloud (8)	Wilson (3)	Michelob Ultra Arena; 3,241
Tuesday, August 17	10:00 p.m.	Indiana Fever	@	Phoenix Mercury	Facebook, Bally Sports Arizona Plus	80–84	Griner (25)	Turner (11)	Taurasi (7)	Griner (4)	Footprint Center; 4,089
Tuesday, August 17	10:30 p.m.	Atlanta Dream	@	Los Angeles Sparks	USA: NBA TV, Spectrum Overflow; Canada: NBA TV Canada	80–85 (OT)	Sims (26)	Tied (9)	N. Ogwumike (9)	Tied (2)	Staples Center; 2,200
Wednesday, August 18	7:00 p.m.	Seattle Storm	@	New York Liberty	CBSSN, JoeTV	79–83	Loyd (35)	Tied (7)	Laney (8)	Tied (2)	Barclays Center; 2,103
Thursday, August 19	7:00 p.m.	Minnesota Lynx	@	Connecticut Sun	USA: NBA TV, NESN; Canada: TSN1/4	71–82	Bonner (31)	Tied (11)	Clarendon (8)	N. Collier (2)	Mohegan Sun Arena; 3,536
Thursday, August 19	10:00 p.m.	Washington Mystics	@	Phoenix Mercury	USA: Twitter, Bally Sports Arizona; Canada: NBA TV Canada	64–77	Griner (30)	Turner (14)	Griner (5)	3 tied (2)	Footprint Center; 5,113
Thursday, August 19	10:30 p.m.	Atlanta Dream	@	Los Angeles Sparks	USA: NBA TV, Spectrum Sportsnet; Canada: SN360	64–66	C. Williams (23)	C. Williams (11)	Toliver (5)	Tied (2)	Staples Center; 1,885
Friday, August 20	7:00 p.m.	Seattle Storm	@	New York Liberty	Amazon Prime Video, JoeTV	99–83	Loyd (29)	Stewart (14)	Whitcomb (8)	Howard (3)	Barclays Center; 3,889
Friday, August 20	8:00 p.m.	Indiana Fever	@	Dallas Wings	CBSSN, Bally Sports Southwest Plus	83–81	Harrison (22)	Harrison (7)	Ogunbowale (6)	Tied (3)	College Park Center; 2,017
Saturday, August 21	12:00 p.m.	Phoenix Mercury	@	Atlanta Dream	USA: ESPN2; Canada: TSN3/5	84–69	Diggins Smith (25)	Griner (12)	Diggins Smith (7)	4 tied (2)	Gateway Center Arena; 2,073
Saturday, August 21	8:00 p.m.	Minnesota Lynx	@	Chicago Sky	USA: NBA TV, WCIU; Canada: SN1	101–95	Tied (27)	Tied (7)	Vandersloot (8)	Tied (3)	Wintrust Arena; 5,036
Sunday, August 22	2:00 p.m.	Los Angeles Sparks	@	New York Liberty	USA: ESPN3, YES, Spectrum Sportsnet; Canada: SN1	86–83	3 tied (17)	Howard (11)	Laney (9)	Tied (2)	Barclays Center; N/A
Sunday, August 22	3:00 p.m.	Seattle Storm	@	Washington Mystics	USA: ESPN; Canada: NBA TV Canada	85–78	Tied (20)	Hines-Allen (17)	Cloud (9)	Stewart (5)	Entertainment and Sports Arena; 3,114
Tuesday, August 24	7:00 p.m.	Seattle Storm	@	Minnesota Lynx	USA: ESPN2; Canada: TSN2	70–76	Fowles (29)	Fowles (20)	Bird (7)	Tied (3)	Target Center; 3,634
Tuesday, August 24	7:00 p.m.	Chicago Sky	@	Atlanta Dream	USA: ESPN3, Bally Sports Southeast, WCIU; Canada: SN1	86–79	Quigley (21)	Parker (9)	Vandersloot (10)	E. Williams (4)	Gateway Center Arena; 1,292
Tuesday, August 24	7:00 p.m.	Las Vegas Aces	@	Connecticut Sun	ESPN3, NESN+, MyLVTV	62–76	January (19)	J. Jones (10)	J. Thomas (6)	Bonner (2)	Mohegan Sun Arena; 4,012
Tuesday, August 24	7:00 p.m.	Los Angeles Sparks	@	Washington Mystics	USA: ESPN3, NBC Sports Washington, Spectrum Sportsnet; Canada: NBA TV Canada	68–78	Hines-Allen (19)	Tied (8)	Cloud (8)	McCall (3)	Entertainment and Sports Arena; 2,620
Wednesday, August 25	7:00 p.m.	Phoenix Mercury	@	New York Liberty	USA: NBA TV, YES; Canada: SN1	106–79	Diggins-Smith (27)	Turner (15)	Taurasi (9)	Tied (2)	Barclays Center; 1,872
Thursday, August 26	7:00 p.m.	Las Vegas Aces	@	Atlanta Dream	USA: NBA TV, Bally Sports Southeast, MyLVTV; Canada: TSN2	78–71	Tied (21)	Wilson (12)	Plum (8)	Billings (4)	Gateway Center Arena; 2,182
Thursday, August 26	7:00 p.m.	Los Angeles Sparks	@	Connecticut Sun	USA: NESN+, Spectrum Sportsnet; Canada: SN1	72–76	B. Jones (23)	J. Jones (11)	Wheeler (9)	Coffey	Mohegan Sun Arena; 3,702
Thursday, August 26	7:00 p.m.	Dallas Wings	@	Washington Mystics	Amazon Prime Video, NBC Sports Washington, Bally Sports Southwest Plus	82–77	Ogunbowale (26)	Harrison (10)	Ogunbowale (9)	6 tied (1)	Entertainment and Sports Arena; 2,465
Friday, August 27	8:00 p.m.	Phoenix Mercury	@	New York Liberty	CBSSN	80–64	Diggins-Smith (27)	Vaughn (11)	Ionescu (9)	R. Allen (3)	Barclays Center; 2,315
Friday, August 27	10:00 p.m.	Chicago Sky	@	Seattle Storm	USA: NBA TV, JoeTV, WCIU; Canada: NBA TV Canada	73–69	Copper (26)	Stevens (10)	Vandersloot (8)	Magbegor (2)	Angel of the Winds Arena; 3,650
Saturday, August 28	1:00 p.m.	Las Vegas Aces	@	Indiana Fever	USA: NBA TV, Bally Sports Indiana, MyLVTV; Canada: SN	87–71	Tied (15)	McCowan (13)	McCowan (7)	Cambage (3)	Indiana Farmers Coliseum; N/A
Saturday, August 28	7:00 p.m.	Los Angeles Sparks	@	Connecticut Sun	USA: NBA TV, NESN+, Spectrum Sportsnet; Canada: SN1	61–76	B. Jones (16)	B. Jones (15)	Wheeler (7)	6 tied (1)	Mohegan Sun Arena; 4,434
Saturday, August 28	7:00 p.m.	Dallas Wings	@	Washington Mystics	Facebook, NBC Sports Washington, Bally Sports Southwest Plus	75–76	Ogunbowale (25)	Harrison (9)	Tied (5)	Zellous (2)	Entertainment and Sports Arena; 2,410
Sunday, August 29	6:00 p.m.	Chicago Sky	@	Seattle Storm	Facebook, KCPQ, WCIU	107–75	Parker (25)	Tied (9)	Vandersloot (10)	Tied (2)	Angel of the Winds Arena; 3,750
Tuesday, August 31	7:00 p.m.	Los Angeles Sparks	@	Indiana Fever	Twitter, Bally Sports Indiana	72–74	K. Mitchell (25)	McCowan (19)	Wheeler (7)	4 tied (1)	Indiana Farmers Coliseum; N/A
Tuesday, August 31	7:00 p.m.	Connecticut Sun	@	Washington Mystics	NBA TV, NBC Sports Washington, NESN+	85–75	J. Jones (31)	J. Jones (14)	Cloud (12)	J. Jones (3)	Entertainment and Sports Arena; 2,269
Tuesday, August 31	8:00 p.m.	New York Liberty	@	Minnesota Lynx	Amazon Prime Video, Bally Sports North Plus	66–74	McBride (25)	N. Collier (14)	Ionescu (6)	R. Allen (3)	Target Center; 3,221
Tuesday, August 31	10:00 p.m.	Chicago Sky	@	Phoenix Mercury	USA: NBA TV, Bally Sportsnet Arizona Plus, WCIU; Canada: NBA TV Canada	83–103	Nurse (21)	Stevens (9)	Diggins-Smith (10)	Copper (3)	Footprint Center; 5,838

September

Date	Time (ET)	Matchup			TV	Result	High points	High rebounds	High assists	High blocks	Location
Thursday, September 2	8:00 p.m.	Atlanta Dream	@	Dallas Wings	Facebook, Bally Sports Southwest, Bally Sports South	68–72	C. Williams (25)	Billings (11)	C. Williams (7)	E. Williams (4)	College Park Center; 1,975
Thursday, September 2	8:00 p.m.	Los Angeles Sparks	@	Minnesota Lynx	USA: NBA TV, Bally Sports North; Canada: SN360	57–66	McBride (17)	Fowles (17)	Wheeler (7)	Tied (2)	Target Center; 3,121
Thursday, September 2	10:00 p.m.	Chicago Sky	@	Las Vegas Aces	USA: NBA TV, MyLVTV, WCIU; Canada: SN360	83–90	Parker (30)	Parker (14)	Vandersloot (8)	Tied (3)	Michelob Ultra Arena; N/A
Thursday, September 2	10:00 p.m.	New York Liberty	@	Seattle Storm	Amazon Prime Video, JoeTV, YES	75–85	Stewart (33)	Stewart (8)	Ionescu (7)	Tied (2)	Angel of the Winds Arena; 3,592
Saturday, September 4	1:00 p.m.	Phoenix Mercury	@	Indiana Fever	USA: NBA TV, Bally Sports Indiana, Bally Sports Arizona; Canada: TSN5	87–65	Griner (22)	Turner (11)	Taurasi (7)	Breland (3)	Indiana Farmers Coliseum; N/A
Saturday, September 4	8:00 p.m.	Washington Mystics	@	Minnesota Lynx	USA: NBA TV, Bally Sports North; Canada: SN1	75–93	Atkins (25)	N. Collier (9)	Banham (8)	Fowles (3)	Target Center; 3,403
Sunday, September 5	1:00 p.m.	Las Vegas Aces	@	Chicago Sky	USA: ABC; Canada: SN1	84–92	Plum (23)	Parker (13)	Parker (8)	Stokes (3)	Wintrust Arena; 5,210
Sunday, September 5	4:00 p.m.	Atlanta Dream	@	Dallas Wings	CBSSN, Bally Sports Southwest Plus	69–64	Hayes (22)	Tied (14)	Harris (6)	E. Williams (3)	College Park Center; 2,386
Monday, September 6	7:00 p.m.	Phoenix Mercury	@	Indiana Fever	USA: NBA TV; Canada: TSN2	86–81	K. Mitchell (23)	McCowan (15)	Allen (7)	Diggins-Smith (3)	Indiana Farmers Coliseum; N/A
Tuesday, September 7	8:00 p.m.	Connecticut Sun	@	Dallas Wings	Amazon Prime Video, Bally Sports Southwest Plus, NESN+	83–56	B. Jones (18)	B. Jones (10)	J. Thomas (6)	J. Jones (3)	College Park Center; 1,945
Tuesday, September 7	10:00 p.m.	Washington Mystics	@	Seattle Storm	CBSSN, JoeTV	71–105	Loyd (20)	Gustafson (8)	Bird (7)	Tied (1)	Angel of the Winds Arena; 2,390
Wednesday, September 8	7:00 p.m.	Phoenix Mercury	@	Atlanta Dream	USA: NBA TV; Canada: SN360	76–75	C. Williams (20)	Turner (15)	Tied (5)	6 tied (1)	Gateway Center Arena; 1,215
Wednesday, September 8	9:00 p.m.	Minnesota Lynx	@	Las Vegas Aces	USA: ESPN2; Canada: TSN3	81–102	Young (29)	Fowles (11)	Gray (14)	7 tied (1)	Michelob Ultra Arena; 5,663
Thursday, September 9	10:30 p.m.	Connecticut Sun	@	Los Angeles Sparks	USA: NBA TV, Spectrum Sportsnet, NESN; Canada: TSN2	75–57	J. Jones (21)	J. Jones (14)	Bonner (5)	J. Jones (2)	Staples Center; 1,695
Friday, September 10	7:00 p.m.	Atlanta Dream	@	Washington Mystics	USA: NBA TV, NBC Sports Washington: NBA TV Canada	74–82	Charles (26)	Charles (16)	3 tied (6)	Tied (2)	Entertainment and Sports Arena; 2,320
Friday, September 10	8:00 p.m.	Indiana Fever	@	Minnesota Lynx	Twitter	72–89	Powers (20)	McCowan (9)	Allen (6)	Fowles (5)	Target Center; 3,503
Saturday, September 11	8:00 p.m.	New York Liberty	@	Dallas Wings	USA: Bally Sports Southwest Plus; Canada: SN1	76–77	Mabrey (21)	Tied (11)	3 tied (6)	Ionescu (2)	College Park Center; 2,888
Saturday, September 11	10:00 p.m.	Connecticut Sun	@	Phoenix Mercury	USA: NESN+ Canada: SN1	76–67	Griner (25)	J. Jones (16)	Tied (5)	Griner (3)	Footprint Center; 9,811
Sunday, September 12	3:00 p.m.	Washington Mystics	@	Chicago Sky	USA: ABC; Canada: NBA TV Canada	79–71	Charles (31)	Parker (11)	Cloud (8)	Plaisance (1)	Wintrust Arena; 4,707
Sunday, September 12	7:00 p.m.	Indiana Fever	@	Minnesota Lynx	USA: NBA TV; Canada: NBA TV Canada	80–90	K. Mitchell (25)	Tied (8)	Tied (7)	McCowan	Target Center; 3,434
Sunday, September 12	9:00 p.m.	Seattle Storm	@	Los Angeles Sparks	USA: NBA TV, Spectrum Sportsnet, JoeTV; Canada: SN	53–81	Cooper (19)	Sykes (10)	Wheeler (4)	Coffey (2)	Staples Center; 4,181
Monday, September 13	3:00 p.m.	Dallas Wings	@	Las Vegas Aces	USA: NBA TV, MyLVTV, Bally Sports Southwest Plus; Canada: TSN3/5	75–85	Plum (30)	Wilson (12)	Mabrey (7)	Kuier (3)	Michelob Ultra Arena; N/A
Tuesday, September 14	7:00 p.m.	Indiana Fever	@	Atlanta Dream	USA: NBA TV, Bally Sports Southeast; Canada: SN1	78–85	Hayes (31)	McCowan (14)	McDonald (6)	McCowan (5)	Gateway Center Arena; 1,208
Wednesday, September 15	7:00 p.m.	New York Liberty	@	Connecticut Sun	CBSSN, NESN+	69–98	Howard (25)	J. Jones (13)	Tied (5)	Howard (3)	Mohegan Sun Arena; 4,012
Thursday, September 16	7:00 p.m.	Los Angeles Sparks	@	Atlanta Dream	Amazon Prime Video, Bally Sports Southeast	74–68	Hayes (25)	Tied (10)	Wheeler (4)	Tied (1)	Gateway Center Arena; 2,537
Friday, September 17	7:00 p.m.	Minnesota Lynx	@	Indiana Fever	CBSSN, Bally Sports North Plus	92–73	K. Mitchell (26)	McCowan (12)	Allen (7)	Tied (2)	Indiana Farmers Coliseum; N/A
Friday, September 17	7:00 p.m.	Washington Mystics	@	New York Liberty	Twitter, YES	91–80	Atkins (29)	Howard (10)	Laney (11)	T. Charles (3)	Barclays Center; 3,615
Friday, September 17	8:00 p.m.	Las Vegas Aces	@	Chicago Sky	USA: NBA TV, WCIU, MyLVTV; Canada: NBA TV Canada	103–70	R. Williams (22)	Stokes (13)	Tied (7)	Parker (4)	Wintrust Arena; 4,911
Friday, September 17	10:00 p.m.	Phoenix Mercury	@	Seattle Storm	USA: NBA TV, JoeTV; Canada: TSN2	85–94	Loyd (37)	Griner (13)	Bird (7)	Griner (2)	Angel of the Winds Arena; 6,000
Sunday, September 19	1:00 p.m.	Atlanta Dream	@	Connecticut Sun	USA: NBA TV, NESN+ Canada: NBA TV Canada	64–84	C. Williams (18)	B. Jones (12)	Tied (4)	J. Jones (2)	Mohegan Sun Arena; 4,724
Sunday, September 19	3:00 p.m.	Las Vegas Aces	@	Phoenix Mercury	USA: ABC; Canada: SN1	84–83	Plum (23)	Turner (8)	Diggins-Smith (7)	Park (2)	Footprint Center; 9,724
Sunday, September 19	3:00 p.m.	Minnesota Lynx	@	Washington Mystics	USA: ESPN3, NBC Sports Washington; Canada: TSN2	83–77	Powers (27)	Tied (13)	Clarendon (6)	N. Collier (2)	Entertainment and Sports Arena; 2,854
Sunday, September 19	5:00 p.m.	Los Angeles Sparks	@	Dallas Wings	USA: NBA TV, Bally Sports Southwest Plus; Canada: TSN2	84–87	Cooper (24)	N. Ogwumike (10)	Wheeler (7)	N. Ogwumike (2)	College Park Center; 3,604
Sunday, September 19	6:00 p.m.	Indiana Fever	@	Chicago Sky	CBSSN, WCIU	87–98	K. Mitchell (32)	McCowan (9)	Allen (10)	6 tied (1)	Wintrust Arena; N/A

2021 WNBA postseason
First Round

Date	Time (ET)	Matchup			TV	Result	High points	High rebounds	High assists	High blocks	Location
Thursday, September 23	8:00 p.m.	Dallas Wings	@	Chicago Sky	USA: ESPN2; Canada: SN1	64–81	Copper (23)	Parker (15)	Parker (7)	5 tied (1)	Wintrust Arena; 4,672
Thursday, September 23	10:00 p.m.	New York Liberty	@	Phoenix Mercury	USA: ESPN2; Canada: SN1, NBA TV Canada	82–83	Laney (25)	Tied (10)	Ionescu (11)	Tied (3)	Grand Canyon University Arena; 5,827

Second Round

Date	Time (ET)	Matchup			TV	Result	High points	High rebounds	High assists	High blocks	Location
Sunday, September 26	3:00 p.m.	Phoenix Mercury	@	Seattle Storm	USA: ABC; Canada: TSN5, NBA TV Canada	85–80 (OT)	Griner (23)	Griner (16)	Diggins-Smith (6)	Turner (3)	Angel of the Winds Arena; N/A
Sunday, September 26	5:00 p.m.	Chicago Sky	@	Minnesota Lynx	USA: ESPN2; Canada: TSN5	89–76	Powers (24)	Copper (10)	Vandersloot (5)	Fowles (2)	Target Center; 4,334

Semifinals

Date	Time (ET)	Matchup			TV	Result	High points	High rebounds	High assists	High blocks	Location
Tuesday, September 28	8:00 p.m.	Chicago Sky	@	Connecticut Sun	USA: EPSN2; Canada: SN1	101–95 (2OT)	J. Jones (26)	J. Jones (11)	Vandersloot (18)	4 tied (2)	Mohegan Sun Arena; 4,720
Tuesday, September 28	10:00 p.m.	Phoenix Mercury	@	Las Vegas Aces	USA: ESPN2; Canada: SN1, NBA TV Canada	90–96	R. Williams (26)	Wilson (9)	Gray (12)	3 tied (2)	Michelob Ultra Arena; 7,009
Thursday, September 30	8:00 p.m.	Chicago Sky	@	Connecticut Sun	USA: EPSN2; Canada: SN360	68–79	Tied (15)	A. Thomas (11)	Tied (6)	Parker (3)	Mohegan Sun Arena; 6,088
Thursday, September 30	10:00 p.m.	Phoenix Mercury	@	Las Vegas Aces	USA: ESPN2; Canada: TSN5, NBA TV Canada	117–91	Taurasi (37)	Wilson (9)	Tied (7)	3 tied (2)	Michelob Ultra Arena; 6,432
Sunday, October 3	1:00 p.m.	Connecticut Sun	@	Chicago Sky	USA: ESPN; Canada: TSN2	83–86	Copper (26)	Stevens (11)	Vandersloot (13)	J. Jones (4)	Wintrust Arena; 7,421
Sunday, October 3	3:00 p.m.	Las Vegas Aces	@	Phoenix Mercury	USA: ABC; Canada: TSN2	60–87	Turner (23)	Turner (17)	Diggins-Smith (9)	Griner (3)	Desert Financial Arena; 7,090
Wednesday, October 6	8:00 p.m.	Connecticut Sun	@	Chicago Sky	USA: ESPN; Canada: TSN4	69–79	J. Jones (25)	J. Jones (11)	Parker (7)	4 tied (2)	Wintrust Arena
Wednesday, October 6	10:00 p.m.	Las Vegas Aces	@	Phoenix Mercury	USA: ESPN; Canada: TSN4	93–76	Gray (22)	Wilson (12)	Tied (6)	Turner (3)	Footprint Center; 11,255
Friday, October 8	9:00 p.m.	Phoenix Mercury	@	Las Vegas Aces	USA: ESPN2; Canada: TSN4	87–84	Griner (28)	Tied (11)	Diggins-Smith (8)	Turner (3)	Michelob Ultra Arena; 9,680

Finals

Date	Time (ET)	Matchup			TV	Result	High points	High rebounds	High assists	High blocks	Location
October 10	3:00 p.m.	Chicago Sky	@	Phoenix Mercury	USA: ABC; Canada: SN, NBA TV Canada	91–77	Copper (21)	Copper (10)	Vandersloot (11)	Parker (2)	Footprint Center; 10,191
October 13	9:00 p.m.	Chicago Sky	@	Phoenix Mercury	USA: ESPN; Canada: TSN2	86–91 (OT)	Griner (29)	5 tied (9)	Vandersloot (14)	Stevens (4)	Footprint Center; 13,685
October 15	9:00 p.m.	Phoenix Mercury	@	Chicago Sky	USA: ESPN2; Canada: TSN2	50–86	Copper (22)	Turner (7)	Vandersloot (10)	Tied (2)	Wintrust Arena; 10,378
October 17	3:00 p.m.	Phoenix Mercury	@	Chicago Sky	USA: ESPN; Canada: SN, NBA TV Canada	74–80	Griner (28)	Parker (13)	Vandersloot (15)	Tied (2)	Wintrust Arena; 10,378

Note: Games highlighted in ██ represent Commissioner’s Cup games.

=== Statistical Leaders ===
The following shows the leaders in each statistical category during the 2021 regular season.

Category	Player	Team	Statistic
Points per game	Tina Charles	Washington Mystics	23.4 ppg
Rebounds per game	Jonquel Jones	Connecticut Sun	11.2 rpg
Assists per game	Courtney Vandersloot	Chicago Sky	8.6 apg
Steals per game	Brittney Sykes	Los Angeles Sparks	1.8 spg
Blocks per game	Brittney Griner	Phoenix Mercury	1.9 bpg
Field goal percentage	Sylvia Fowles	Minnesota Lynx	64.0% (208/325)
Three point FG percentage	Allie Quigley	Chicago Sky	45.4% (54/119)
Free throw percentage	Kelsey Plum	Las Vegas Aces	94.4% (85/90)
Points per game (team)	Las Vegas Aces		89.3 ppg
Field goal percentage (team)	Las Vegas Aces		47.2%

== Playoffs ==
The WNBA continued its current playoff format for 2021. The top eight teams, regardless of conference, make the playoffs, with the top two teams receiving a bye to the semifinals. The remaining six teams play in two single-elimination playoff rounds, with the third and fourth seeds receiving a bye to the second round.

**First round** single elimination Sept. 23
**5**	**Phoenix Mercury**	**83**
8	New York Liberty	82
**6**	**Chicago Sky**	**81**
7	Dallas Wings	64

**Second round** single elimination Sept. 26
4	Seattle Storm	80
**5**	**Phoenix Mercury**	**85^{OT}**
3	Minnesota Lynx	76
**6**	**Chicago Sky**	**89**

**Semifinals**; Best-of-5; Sept. 28 – Oct. 8
2	Las Vegas Aces	2
**5**	**Phoenix Mercury**	**3**
1	Connecticut Sun	1
**6**	**Chicago Sky**	**3**

**Finals**; Best-of-5; Oct. 10 – 17
5	Phoenix Mercury	1
**6**	**Chicago Sky**	**3**

Note: Teams re-seeded after each round.

- **Bold** – Game or series winner
- Italic – Team with home-court advantage

== Awards ==
=== Individual ===
The award previously titled "Sixth Woman of the Year" was changed to "Sixth Player" starting with this season.

Award		Winner	Team	Position	Votes/Statistic
Most Valuable Player (MVP)		Jonquel Jones	Connecticut Sun	Forward/Center	48 of 49
Finals MVP		Kahleah Copper	Chicago Sky	Guard/Forward	
Rookie of the Year		Michaela Onyenwere	New York Liberty	Forward	47 of 49
Most Improved Player		Brionna Jones	Connecticut Sun	Forward	38 of 49
Defensive Player of the Year		Sylvia Fowles	Minnesota Lynx	Center	31 of 49
Sixth Player of the Year		Kelsey Plum	Las Vegas Aces	Guard	41 of 49
Kim Perrot Sportsmanship Award		Nneka Ogwumike	Los Angeles Sparks	Forward	19 of 46
Season-Long Community Assist Award		Amanda Zahui B.	Los Angeles Sparks	Center	
Peak Performers	**Points**	Tina Charles	Washington Mystics	Center	23.4 ppg
Peak Performers	**Rebounds**	Jonquel Jones	Connecticut Sun	Forward/Center	11.2 rpg
Peak Performers	**Assists**	Courtney Vandersloot	Chicago Sky	Guard	8.6 apg
Coach of the Year		Curt Miller	Connecticut Sun	Coach	41 of 49
Basketball Executive of the Year		Dan Padover	Las Vegas Aces	General manager	9 ballots

=== Team ===
Award		Guard	Guard	Forward	Forward	Center
**All-WNBA**	**First Team**	Skylar Diggins-Smith	Jewell Loyd	Breanna Stewart	Jonquel Jones	Brittney Griner
**All-WNBA**	**Second Team**	Arike Ogunbowale	Courtney Vandersloot	Tina Charles	A'ja Wilson	Sylvia Fowles
**All-Defensive**	**First Team**	Brittney Sykes	Briann January	Brianna Turner	Jonquel Jones	Sylvia Fowles
**All-Defensive**	**Second Team**	Jasmine Thomas	Ariel Atkins	Brionna Jones	Breanna Stewart	Brittney Griner
**All-Rookie Team**		Dana Evans	Aari McDonald	Michaela Onyenwere	DiDi Richards	Charli Collier

=== Players of the Week ===
Week ending	Eastern Conference		Western Conference		Reference
Week ending	Player	Team	Player	Team	Reference
May 24	Sabrina Ionescu	New York Liberty	Breanna Stewart	Seattle Storm	
June 1	Betnijah Laney	New York Liberty	Brittney Griner	Phoenix Mercury	
June 7	Jonquel Jones	Connecticut Sun	Jewell Loyd	Seattle Storm	
June 14	Tina Charles	Washington Mystics	Breanna Stewart (3)	Seattle Storm	
June 21	Courtney Vandersloot	Chicago Sky	Breanna Stewart (3)	Seattle Storm	
June 28	DeWanna Bonner	Connecticut Sun	Sylvia Fowles	Minnesota Lynx	
July 6	Brionna Jones	Connecticut Sun	A'ja Wilson	Las Vegas Aces	
July 12	Jonquel Jones (5)	Connecticut Sun	Brittney Griner (3)	Phoenix Mercury	
August 23	Jonquel Jones (5)	Connecticut Sun	Brittney Griner (3)	Phoenix Mercury	
August 30	Jonquel Jones (5)	Connecticut Sun	Skylar Diggins-Smith	Phoenix Mercury	
September 6	Jonquel Jones (5)	Connecticut Sun	Brittney Griner (5)	Phoenix Mercury	
September 13	Tina Charles (2)	Washington Mystics	Brittney Griner (5)	Phoenix Mercury	
September 20	Natasha Howard	New York Liberty	Kelsey Plum	Las Vegas Aces	

=== Players of the Month ===
Month	Eastern Conference		Western Conference		Reference
Month	Player	Team	Player	Team	Reference
May	Jonquel Jones	Connecticut Sun	Breanna Stewart	Seattle Storm	
June	Tina Charles	Washington Mystics	A'ja Wilson	Las Vegas Aces	
August	Jonquel Jones (3)	Connecticut Sun	Sylvia Fowles	Minnesota Lynx	
September	Jonquel Jones (3)	Connecticut Sun	Kelsey Plum	Las Vegas Aces	

=== Rookies of the Month ===
Month	Player	Team	Reference
May	Michaela Onyenwere (4)	New York Liberty	
June	Michaela Onyenwere (4)	New York Liberty	
August	Michaela Onyenwere (4)	New York Liberty	
September	Michaela Onyenwere (4)	New York Liberty	

=== Coaches of the Month ===
Month	Coach	Team	Reference
May	Walt Hopkins	New York Liberty	
June	James Wade	Chicago Sky	
August	Curt Miller (2)	Connecticut Sun	
September	Curt Miller (2)	Connecticut Sun	

== Coaches ==
=== Eastern Conference ===
Team	Head coach	Previous job	Years with team	Record with team	Playoff appearances	Finals Appearances	WNBA Championships
Atlanta Dream	Mike Petersen (interim)	Atlanta Dream (assistant)	0	0–0	0	0	0
Chicago Sky	James Wade	UMMC Ekaterinburg (assistant)	2	32–24	2	0	0
Connecticut Sun	Curt Miller	Los Angeles Sparks (assistant)	5	89–69	4	1	0
Indiana Fever	Marianne Stanley	Washington Mystics (assistant)	1	6–16	0	0	0
New York Liberty	Walt Hopkins	Minnesota Lynx (assistant)	1	2–20	0	0	0
Washington Mystics	Mike Thibault	Connecticut Sun	8	139–121	7	2	1

=== Western Conference ===
Team	Head coach	Previous job	Years with team	Record with team	Playoff appearances	Finals Appearances	WNBA Championships
Dallas Wings	Vickie Johnson	Las Vegas Aces (assistant)	0	0–0	0	0	0
Las Vegas Aces	Bill Laimbeer	New York Liberty	3	53–37	2	1	0
Los Angeles Sparks	Derek Fisher	New York Knicks	2	37–19	2	0	0
Minnesota Lynx	Cheryl Reeve	Detroit Shock (assistant)	11	245–117	10	6	4
Phoenix Mercury	Sandy Brondello	Los Angeles Sparks (assistant)	7	131–95	7	1	1
Seattle Storm	Dan Hughes	San Antonio Stars	3	62–28	3	2	2

Notes:

- Year with team does not include 2021 season.
- Records are from time at current team and are through the end of the 2020 regular season.
- Playoff appearances are from time at current team only.
- WNBA Finals and Championships do not include time with other teams.
- Coaches shown are the coaches who began the 2021 season as head coach of each team.
