= WNBA Basketball Executive of the Year =

Women's National Basketball Association award

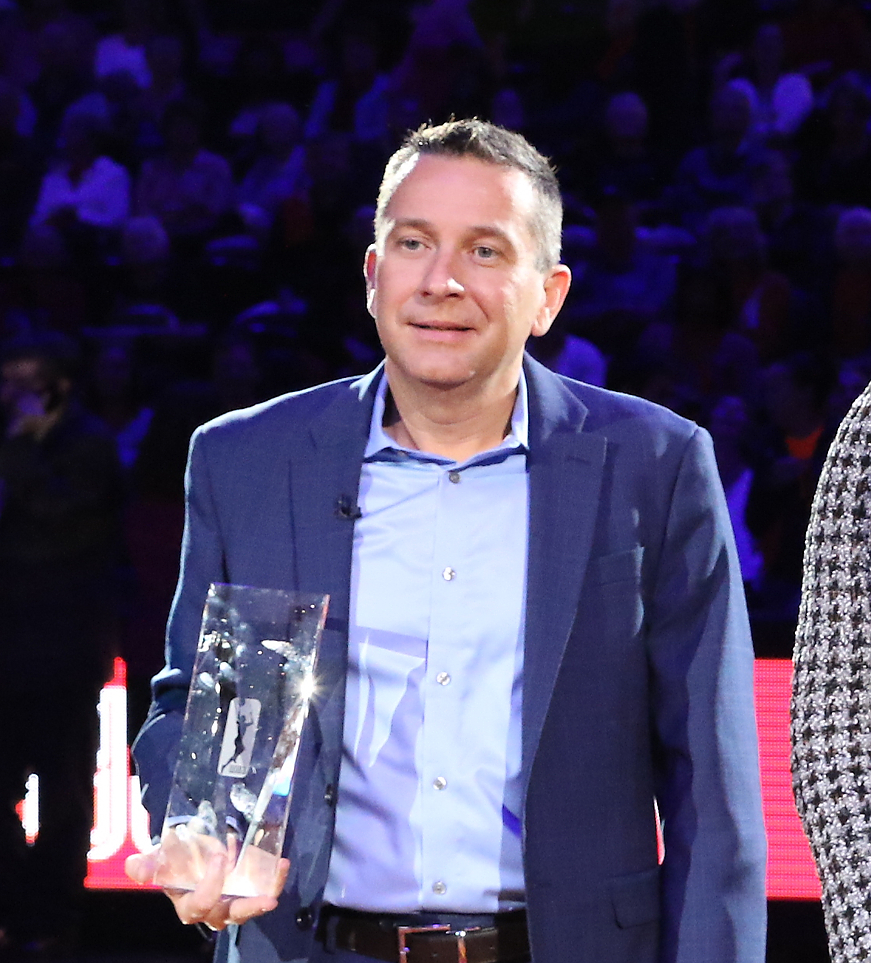
Curt Miller, shown accepting the 2017 WNBA Coach of the Year Award, was also the league's first Executive of the Year, winning that award the same season.

The WNBA Basketball Executive of the Year Award is an annual Women's National Basketball Association (WNBA) award first presented after the league's 2017 regular season. The winner is selected at the end of the regular season by a panel consisting of the general managers of each of the WNBA's teams, each of whom casts a vote for first, second, and third place. Panel members are not allowed to vote for themselves. Each first-place vote is worth five points; each second-place vote is worth three points; and each third-place vote is worth one point. The person with the highest point total, regardless of the number of first-place votes, wins the award.

Dan Padover and Cheryl Reeve have both won the award the most times, with three selections. Reeve is the first to win both Coach of the Year and Executive of the Year in the same season twice.

== Winners ==
Executive (X)	Denotes the number of times the executive has won
Team (X)	Denotes the number of times an executive from this team has won

Year	Executive	Team	Ref.
2017	Curt Miller	Connecticut Sun	
2018	Chris Sienko	Atlanta Dream	
2019	Cheryl Reeve	Minnesota Lynx	
2020	Dan Padover	Las Vegas Aces	
2021	Dan Padover (2)	Las Vegas Aces (2)	
2022	James Wade	Chicago Sky	
2023	Jonathan Kolb	New York Liberty	
2024	Cheryl Reeve (2)	Minnesota Lynx (2)	
2025	Dan Padover (3)	Atlanta Dream (2)	
2026	Cheryl Reeve (3)	Minnesota Lynx (3)	

== Multi-time winners ==
Awards	Executive	Team(s)	Years
3	Dan Padover	Las Vegas Aces (2) / Atlanta Dream (1)	2020, 2021, 2025
3	Cheryl Reeve	Minnesota Lynx (3)	2019, 2024, 2026

== See also ==
- List of sports awards honoring women
