= Mike Petersen (basketball) =

American basketball coach (born 1958)

Atlanta Dream
- Position: Advisor
- League: WNBA

Personal information
- Born: April 18, 1958 (age 68) Eureka, California, U.S.

Career information
- High school: Eureka (Eureka, California)
- College: College of the Redwoods (1976–1978); Northwest Christian (1978–1980)
- Coaching career: 1980–2015, 2017–2021

Career history

Coaching
- 1980–1983: Northwest Christian (assistant)
- 1983–1985: Oregon (women's) (assistant)
- 1985–1989: Gonzaga (women's)
- 1989–1992: Oregon (assistant)
- 1992–1996: New Mexico State (women's)
- 1996–1999: TCU (women's)
- 1999–2000: Minnesota (assistant)
- 2000–2004: Minnesota (associate HC)
- 2004–2012: Wake Forest (women's)
- 2012–2015: North Texas (women's)
- 2017–2020: Atlanta Dream (assistant)
- 2021: Atlanta Dream (interim)

Career highlights
- WCC regular season champion (1988); Big West regular season champion (1995)

Career coaching record
- WNBA: 6–13 (.316)
- NCAA: 341–311 (.523)

Mike Petersen (born April 18, 1958) is an American former head coach for the Atlanta Dream in 2021. Before joining the Women's National Basketball Association, Petersen coached five women's college basketball teams between the 1980s to 2010s. While Petersen coached the Wake Forest Demon Deacons women's basketball team for eight years, his players competed in the 2005 Women's National Invitation Tournament and reached the third round. Additional teams he coached were for Gonzaga, New Mexico State, TCU and North Texas. Overall, Petersen had 341 wins and 311 losses in the NCAA.

In men's college basketball, Petersen was an assistant coach for Northwest Christian College, Oregon and Minnesota. During the late 2010s, he was part of the National Basketball Association as a scout for the New Orleans Pelicans. Petersen moved to the WNBA in 2017 when he became an assistant coach for the Atlanta Dream. After being selected as interim head coach in May 2021 for the Dream, Petersen ended his position in July 2021 due to his personal health. Following his 6 wins and 13 losses, Petersen stayed with the Dream as an advisor.

== Early life and education ==
Petersen was born in Eureka, California on April 18, 1958. While attending high school, Petersen was on the baseball and basketball teams. From 1976 to 1980, Petersen played basketball for two years at College of the Redwoods before playing an additional two years at Northwest Christian College.

At Redwoods, Petersen was the team's captain for a season before he left for Northwest Christian. During his playing career at Northwest Christian, Petersen held the points per game season record in 1980 and was named the Most Valuable Player for the college that year. Petersen remained at Northwest Christian until he completed his biblical studies program in 1983.

== Career ==
=== 1980s to mid 2000s ===
While at Northwest Christian, Petersen was an assistant coach for their men's basketball team from 1980 to 1983. He continued his assistant coach experience with the Oregon Ducks women's basketball for two years. As the head coach of the Gonzaga Bulldogs women's basketball between 1985 and 1989, Petersen's team first played in the NAIA. Following their move to the NCAA Division I in 1987, Petersen and Gonzaga was first in the 1988 West Coast Athletic Conference.

Upon ending his tenure with Gonzaga in 1989, Petersen had 65 wins and 48 losses. After Petersen left Gonzaga in order to become an assistant coach for the men's basketball team at Butler University, he was chosen as an assistant coach with Oregon in June 1989. From 1989 to 1992, Petersen was an assistant coach on the Oregon Ducks men's basketball team. A month after joining the New Mexico State Roadrunners women's basketball team as an assistant coach, Petersen became their head coach in September 1992.

While with New Mexico State until 1996, the school reached the semifinals at the Big West Conference women's basketball tournament four times. Petersen and his team finished in sixth at the 1994 National Women's Invitational Tournament. As a Women's National Invitation Tournament competitor, Petersen and New Mexico State reached the first round of the 1995 preseason event. Petersen had 81 wins and 38 losses with New Mexico State.

In 1996, Petersen joined the TCU Lady Frogs women's basketball team as their head coach. As a WAC women's basketball tournament competitor, TCU were quarter-finalists in 1999. Petersen had 42 wins and 41 losses as their head coach. That year, Petersen joined the Minnesota Golden Gophers men's basketball team as an assistant coach. After becoming an associate head coach for the team in 2000, Petersen remained with Minnesota until 2004.

=== Mid 2000s to 2020s ===
In 2004, Petersen became head coach of the Wake Forest Demon Deacons women's basketball team. At the 2005 Women's National Invitation Tournament, Wake Forest reached the third round. They were also semifinalists at the 2012 ACC women's basketball tournament. Petersen had 125 wins and 123 losses after ending his position that year.

In April 2012, Petersen replaced Karen Aston as the head coach of the North Texas Mean Green women's basketball team. At the 2013 Sun Belt Conference women's basketball tournament, the school played one game. That year, North Texas joined the Conference USA. The team played one game at the 2014 Conference USA women's basketball tournament. Petersen had 28 wins and 61 losses with North Texas when his position ended in 2015.

During the late 2010s, Petersen was a National Basketball Association scout as part of the New Orleans Pelicans before joining the Atlanta Dream in 2017. With the Women's National Basketball Association team, Petersen started out as an assistant coach before he was named the Dream's interim head coach in May 2021. During the 2021 WNBA season, Petersen had 6 wins and 13 losses before ending his coaching position in July 2021 due to his personal health. After being replaced by Darius Taylor, it was announced that Petersen would remain with the Dream as an advisor.

== Head coaching record ==
=== WNBA ===
Legend
Regular season	G	Games coached	W	Games won	L	Games lost	W–L %	Win–loss %
Playoffs	PG	Playoff games	PW	Playoff wins	PL	Playoff losses	PW–L %	Playoff win–loss %

Team	Year	G	W	L	W–L%	Finish	PG	PW	PL	PW–L%	Result
Atlanta	2021	19	6	13	.316	(resigned)	—	—	—	—	—

=== College ===
Record table
Season	Team	Overall	Conference	Standing	Postseason
Gonzaga Bulldogs (1985–1986)
1985–86	Gonzaga	21–10			
Gonzaga Bulldogs (NCAA Division I Independent) (1986–1987)
1986–87	Gonzaga	11–16			
Gonzaga Bulldogs (West Coast Conference) (1987–1989)
1987–88	Gonzaga	18–9	11–3	1st	
1988–89	Gonzaga	15–13	11–3	2nd	
Gonzaga:		65–48 (.575)	22–6 (.786)		
New Mexico State Aggies (Big West Conference) (1992–1996)
1992–93	New Mexico State	17–11	11–7	5th	
1993–94	New Mexico State	24–8	14–4	T–2nd	
1994–95	New Mexico State	20–9	14–4	1st	NWIT Third Round
1995–96	New Mexico State	20–10	14–4	3rd	
New Mexico State:		81–38 (.681)	53–19 (.736)		
TCU Horned Frogs (Western Athletic Conference) (1996–1999)
1996–97	TCU	13–14	7–9	T–9th	
1997–98	TCU	13–15	4–10	T–12th	
1998–99	TCU	16–12	7–7	T–8th	
TCU:		42–41 (.506)	18–26 (.409)		
Wake Forest Demon Deacons (Atlantic Coast Conference) (2004–2012)
2004–05	Wake Forest	17–15	3–11	10th	WNIT Third Round
2005–06	Wake Forest	12–16	3–11	10th	
2006–07	Wake Forest	9–20	0–14	12th	
2007–08	Wake Forest	15–15	2–12	11th	
2008–09	Wake Forest	19–12	5–9	9th	WNIT Second Round
2009–10	Wake Forest	18–14	7–7	5th	
2010–11	Wake Forest	15–17	5–9	9th	
2011–12	Wake Forest	20–14	7–9	T–7th	WNIT First Round
Wake Forest:		125–123 (.504)	32–82 (.281)		
North Texas Mean Green (Sun Belt Conference) (2012–2013)
2012–13	North Texas	11–19	10–10		
North Texas Mean Green (Conference USA) (2013–2015)
2013–14	North Texas	12–18	6–10		
2014–15	North Texas	5–24	4–14		
North Texas:		28–61 (.315)	20–34 (.370)		
Total:		341–311 (.523)			
National champion Postseason invitational champion Conference regular season champion Conference regular season and conference tournament champion Division regular season champion Division regular season and conference tournament champion Conference tournament champion

== Honors and personal life ==
Petersen became part of a hall of fame for Northwest Christian College in 2007. He is married and has two children.
