= Atlanta Dream =

Women's National Basketball Association franchise based in Atlanta, Georgia

- 2026 Atlanta Dream season
- Conference: Eastern
- Leagues: WNBA
- Founded: 2008
- History: Atlanta Dream; 2008–present
- Arena: Gateway Center Arena; State Farm Arena (2027)
- Location: College Park, Georgia
- Team colors: Red, dark grey, light grey, light blue, white
- Main sponsor: Emory Healthcare
- General manager: Dan Padover
- Head coach: Karl Smesko
- Assistants: Camryn Brown; Chelsea Lyles; LaToya Sanders; Brandi Poole
- Ownership: Larry Gottesdiener; Suzanne Abair; Renee Montgomery
- Championships: 0
- Conference titles: 3 (2010, 2011, 2013) (Note: The WNBA awarded conference championships to the winners of the Conference Finals in the playoffs from 1998 to 2015.)
- Website: dream.wnba.com
Heroine	Explorer	Rebel

The Atlanta Dream are an American professional basketball team based in the Atlanta metropolitan area. The Dream compete in the Women's National Basketball Association (WNBA) as a member of the Eastern Conference. The team was founded for the 2008 WNBA season. The team is owned by real estate investors Larry Gottesdiener, Suzanne Abair, and former Dream player Renee Montgomery. Although the Dream share the Atlanta market with the National Basketball Association's Hawks, the Dream are not affiliated with the Hawks.

The Dream has qualified for the WNBA playoffs in ten of its seventeen years in Atlanta and has reached the WNBA Finals four times. The franchise has been home to many high-quality players such as University of Louisville standouts Angel McCoughtry and Shoni Schimmel, former Finals MVP Betty Lennox, and Brazilian sharpshooter Izi Castro Marques. The Dream went to the WNBA Finals in consecutive years but were swept by the Seattle Storm in 2010 and the Minnesota Lynx in 2011. The team lost to the Lynx again in the 2013 Finals and to the Golden State Valkyries in the 2026 Finals.

== History ==
=== Joining the league ===
Before the success of the United States women's basketball team in the 1996 Olympic Games, the American Basketball League was interested in placing a women's professional basketball team in Atlanta as early as 1995. Eight of the twelve Olympians played on ABL teams when the league began play in October 1996. The Atlanta Glory played at Forbes Arena and lasted two seasons before folding before the start of the 1998–99 season, which would be the ABL's final.

Atlanta had been mentioned as a possible future city for WNBA expansion, but efforts did not come together until the beginning of 2007 when an organizing committee with Atlanta businesswomen/men and politicians began the effort to attract an expansion team. The inability of the Atlanta Hawks of the NBA to draw crowds was a concern of the WNBA, and the committee kicked off an effort in February 2007 to gain volunteers and petition signatures. Philips Arena, The Arena at Gwinnett Center, and Alexander Memorial Coliseum were candidates for venues. By May 2007, the committee had over 1,000 pledges for season tickets, although the goal was 8,000 season tickets in ninety days. By July the committee had 1,200 commitments and began searching for an owner.

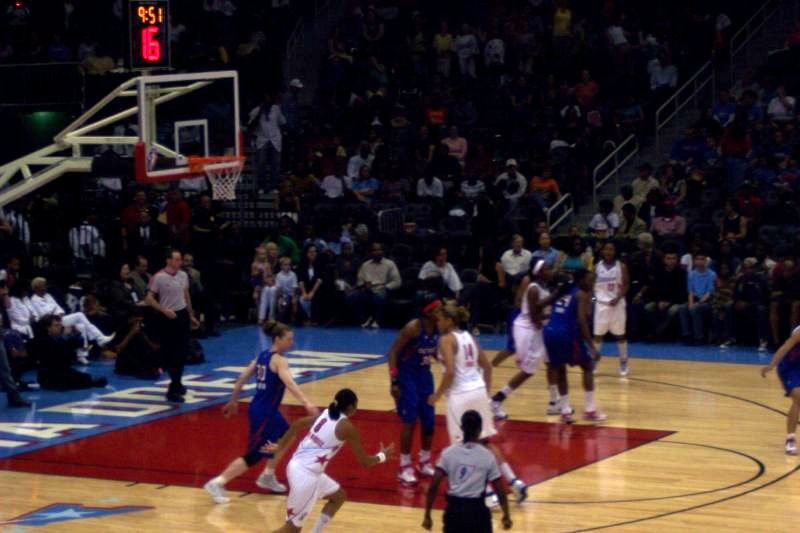
Dream game in 2008

On October 16, 2007, it was reported that Ron Terwilliger, an Atlanta businessman and CEO of a national real estate company would be the future owner of an Atlanta franchise. The next day, at a news conference at Atlanta's Centennial Olympic Park, WNBA president Donna Orender announced that Atlanta would officially be granted a WNBA expansion franchise.

On November 27, 2007, Atlanta named Marynell Meadors, a coach with extensive experience at the college level, the first head coach and general manager in franchise history. This was Meadors' second role as a coach/general manager in the WNBA following a stint with the Charlotte Sting. Afterward, Meadors had served as a scouting director for the Miami Sol and had been an assistant coach under Richie Adubato and Tree Rollins for the Washington Mystics. Former NBA player Dennis Rodman volunteered his name as head coach for the Dream. Terwilliger declined, stating that he wanted someone with more coaching experience and he felt that the head coach should be a woman, as the WNBA was a women's league.

On December 5, 2007, an online contest was announced for people to vote on the team name and team colors, while the final choice rested with owner Ron Terwilliger. The names offered as choices were "Dream", "Flight", "Surge" and "Sizzle". On January 23, 2008, the team name was announced as the Dream, inspired by the famous speech of Atlanta native Martin Luther King Jr., and the team colors were sky blue, red, and white.

Atlanta held its expansion draft on February 6, 2008, when it selected one player from each of the 13 teams in the league. Atlanta traded Roneeka Hodges and their number four pick in the 2008 WNBA draft to the Seattle Storm for Izi Castro Marques and Seattle's eighth pick in the 2008 WNBA Draft. Also, the Dream traded the 18th pick and LaToya Thomas to the Detroit Shock for Ivory Latta.

From May 17, 2008, with a season-opening loss against the Connecticut Sun to July 3, 2008, with a home loss against the Houston Comets, the Dream lost 17 consecutive games, setting the WNBA all-time record for both consecutive losses and losses from opening day. The 2006 Chicago Sky had previously lost 13 consecutive games, and the 2002 Detroit Shock had opened their season 0–13. On July 5, the Dream earned their first win in Atlanta 91–84 against the Chicago Sky, ending the losing streak. They later finished with a 4–30 record.

=== Angel McCoughtry era (2008–2019) ===
Not wanting a repeat of 2008, head coach and general manager Marynell Meadors acquired players such as Sancho Lyttle, Nikki Teasley, Chamique Holdsclaw, Angel McCoughtry, and Michelle Snow in the 2008–2009 offseason. In 2009, Atlanta reached the playoffs at 18–16, exceeding their previous record by 14 wins, but lost in the first round to the 2008 champion Detroit Shock in a sweep. After the season, their coach, Marynell Meadors, was awarded the Coach of the Year Award.

The Dream's owner, Ron Terwilliger, announced in August that he wanted to give up his position as the primary owner of the Atlanta franchise. On October 29, 2009, Kathy Betty took control of the team under the business entity Dream Too, LLC.

The 2010 season saw further improvement, finishing in fourth place in the Eastern Conference. The Dream then made it through the first two rounds of the playoffs and secured a trip to the WNBA Finals with a win over the New York Liberty, as they swept New York in two games in the Eastern Conference Finals. They eventually faced the best team in the league, the 28–6 Seattle Storm. Seattle took the first two games at home with two close wins. Seattle completed the sweep and won the series in Atlanta. Even though they were swept, the Dream did not lose any game by a margin of more than three points.

Addressing arguably Atlanta's biggest concern, the team traded for All-Star point guard Lindsey Harding prior to the 2011 season. Despite the addition, the Dream struggled to open the season, starting with a 2–7 record due to an injury that sidelined Angel McCoughtry and overseas commitments by Sancho Lyttle. The team then went on a run of 14 wins and 5 losses after the All-Star break. They carried that momentum into the playoffs, sweeping the Connecticut Sun and defeating the Indiana Fever to return to the WNBA Finals. However, they lost to the 27–7 Minnesota Lynx in three games.

During the 2011 season, Betty sold Dream Too LLC to local investors Mary Brock and Kelly Loeffler.

The Dream started the 2012 season with a 12–12 record and fired head coach and general manager Meadors during a dispute with league-leading scorer Angel McCoughtry. Meadors was replaced by Fred Williams, finished with a 19–15 record, and lost in the first round.

The following 2013 season, the team again made it to the WNBA Finals, and again was swept by the Lynx. Williams' contract was not renewed.

Michael Cooper was then hired for the 2014 season. He led the team to the playoffs in 2014 and 2016 but was fired after failing to make the playoffs in 2017.

On October 30, 2017, the Dream hired Nicki Collen as their new head coach. Collen came over to Atlanta after serving as an assistant coach for the Connecticut Sun. Collen helped the Dream finish first in the Eastern Conference in 2018, finishing with a 23-11 record. They ultimately ended up losing in the Semifinals that year.

2019 was a struggle for the Dream. Angel McCoughtry was still recovering from her ACL tear that occurred during the 2018 year. Tiffany Hayes and Brittney Sykes were bright spots – both averaging in double figures for the year. But that wasn't enough, the Dream finished with the worst record in the Eastern Conference with an 8-26 record. With the WNBA's lottery system of 2-year combine records, the Dream had the worst shot at receiving the top pick in the 2020 WNBA draft and they received the 4th Overall Pick.

=== Rebranding and turmoil (2020–2021) ===
On October 18, 2019, the Dream unveiled an updated logo and color scheme, the first change to their branding since the team's inception in 2008.

Star Angel McCoughtry announced that she wasn't going to return to the Dream in the 2020 season – choosing to sign with the Las Vegas Aces. This began the transformation of the new look Dream. Tiffany Hayes and Renee Montgomery announced that they would be sitting out the "bubble" season, leaving Elizabeth Williams as the only starter coming back from the last two seasons. The Dream selected young star guard Chennedy Carter in the 2020 WNBA draft to start the rebuild.

The Dream played slightly better in 2020 compared to 2019, but still missed the playoffs with a 7-15 record and were the third worst team in the league. Shortly after the George Floyd protests began, the WNBA and players' union decided to put Black Lives Matter and Say Her Name slogans on warmup gear and opening weekend uniforms. By then, team owner Kelly Loeffler was a Republican U.S. Senator, and she criticized the league's support for Black Lives Matter. At the next game, Dream players wore black T-shirts with the slogan "VOTE WARNOCK," endorsing her election opponent Raphael Warnock, an African-American pastor who then defeated Loeffler. The players' union then demanded that Loeffler sell her stake in the team. A three-member investor group, including former Atlanta Dream guard Renee Montgomery, were approved to purchase the team in February 2021.

Collen seemed excited for the upcoming 2021, but left the Dream to go to Baylor about a week before the season began. The Dream promoted Mike Petersen to interim head coach, but he stepped down on July 24 for health reasons. Darius Taylor took over as interim coach through the end of the regular season.

Coaching changes were not the only issue the Dream faced. Chennedy Carter was suspended on July 5, 2021, due to conduct detrimental to the team and never played again. The Dream's season once again put them at the bottom of the standings and missed the playoffs again. They went 8–24 during the year. Following the season, it was announced that Courtney Williams and Crystal Bradford would not be re-signed due to their roles in an altercation off the court. The league announced that they would be suspended for a couple games in the 2022 season.

The Dream and Carter could not work out their differences from the following season, and on February 5, 2022, the Dream traded her to the Los Angeles Sparks in exchange for Erica Wheeler and some draft picks.

=== Rhyne Howard era (2022–present) ===
Tasked with trying to turn the team around, the Dream hired Tanisha Wright as their new head coach on October 12, 2021. Wright had played in the league for 12 years and had most recently been an assistant under Bill Laimbeer of the Las Vegas Aces. Wright hired Christie Sides, Paul Goriss, and Barbara Turner to her staff in March of 2022.

The Dream also announced some new partners and sponsors for the upcoming season. Microsoft and Xbox were announced on April 5, 2022. The Dream also announced Emory Healthcare as the first-ever marquee jersey partner. The expanded partnership was put on display as the Emory Healthcare logo made its debut on the Dream's jerseys during the 2022 season.

The Dream began looking for their next face of the franchise and acquire the 1st Overall Pick in the 2022 WNBA draft from the Washington Mystics on April 6, 2022. They selected Rhyne Howard out of Kentucky as the 1st Overall Pick. Howard was a three-time AP All-America First Team selection, averaged 20.5 points, 7.4 rebounds and 3.3 assists as a senior.

In 2025, the Dream signed 10-time All-Star Brittney Griner on a one-year deal.

In April 2026, the Dream selected Angel Reese as part of a trade deal for the draft picks. In August 2026, DeWanna Bonner signed with the Dream as part of the unrestricted free agent.

The Dream ended the 2026 season as the 4th seed winning 44 games and qualifying for the playoffs. They entered the second round playing against the 5th seed Washington Mystics. They beat the Mystics in 2 games, advancing to the second round playing against the New York Liberty. They swept the Liberty in 3 games, advancing to the WNBA Finals for the first time since 2013.

==== "Homegrown" campaign and Nike Rebel uniform update ====
For the 2026 season, to coincide with the league-wide update of the Nike, Inc. Rebel Edition uniform updates, the Dream launched the "Homegrown" campaign. Tied to the uniform's new "bubble logo," the Dream has partnered with Monarch Commerce to offer a full lineup of apparel and accessories branded with the "atl" bubble logo, as well as a new "Homegrown" logos, which consist of a peach with a stylized "A" in addition to stylized "homegrown" wordmark logos. The new atl bubble logo is also featured prominently on the front of the new Rebel jerseys.

== Arenas ==
The Dream played at Philips Arena in downtown Atlanta, shared with the Atlanta Hawks, from 2008 to 2016. In 2013, the team qualified for the WNBA Finals, but a scheduling conflict forced them to play home games at The Arena at Gwinnett Center, in suburban Duluth. Due to renovations to Philips Arena during the Hawks' 2017 and 2018 offseasons, the Dream played home games at McCamish Pavilion on the campus of the Georgia Institute of Technology.

The team returned to the renovated and former Philips Arena, which was renamed State Farm Arena in 2018, for the 2019 season. Following the conclusion of the 2019 WNBA regular season, team officials indicated that the Dream would not be returning to State Farm Arena for the 2020 season, citing disagreements with the Hawks' management. The team announced on October 18, 2019, coinciding with their rebranding, they would move to the new Gateway Center Arena in nearby College Park for the 2020 season (later delayed to the 2021 season), sharing the arena with the Hawks' NBA G League affiliate, the College Park Skyhawks.

Beginning in 2024, the Dream returned to State Farm Arena for select games, playing two games in 2024, one game in 2025, and five games in 2026. On October 6, 2026, the team announced they would return to State Farm Arena full time beginning in the 2027 season.

The Dream used State Farm Arena to start the 2026 WNBA playoff run. Scheduling conflicts from a previously scheduled concert and the Atlanta Hawks home opener threatened to see the team play the 2026 WNBA Finals at the Gateway Center Arena for Game 3 and Game 4, but an agreement was reached that moved the two games to where each could be played at State Farm, as well as Game 6.

Arenas
Arena	Tenure
Philips Arena	2008–2016
McCamish Pavilion	2017–2018
State Farm Arena	2019
Gateway Center Arena	2020–present

== Season-by-season records ==
Season	Team	Conference		Regular season			Playoff Results	Head coach
Season	Team	Conference		W	L	PCT	Playoff Results	Head coach
Atlanta Dream
2008	2008	East	7th	4	30	.118	Did not qualify	Marynell Meadors
2009	2009	East	2nd	18	16	.529	Lost Conference Semifinals (Detroit, 0–2)	Marynell Meadors
2010	2010	East	4th	19	15	.559	Won Conference Semifinals (Washington, 2–0); Won Conference Finals (New York, 2–0); Lost WNBA Finals (Seattle, 0–3)	Marynell Meadors
2011	2011	East	3rd	20	14	.588	Won Conference Semifinals (Connecticut, 2–0); Won Conference Finals (Indiana, 2–1); Lost WNBA Finals (Minnesota, 0–3)	Marynell Meadors
2012	2012	East	3rd	19	15	.559	Lost Conference Semifinals (Indiana, 1–2)	M. Meadors (12–12); F. Williams (7–3)
2013	2013	East	2nd	17	17	.500	Won Conference Semifinals (Washington, 2–1); Won Conference Finals (Indiana, 2–0); Lost WNBA Finals (Minnesota, 0–3)	Fred Williams
2014	2014	East	1st	19	15	.559	Lost Conference Semifinals (Chicago, 1–2)	Michael Cooper
2015	2015	East	5th	15	19	.441	Did not qualify	Michael Cooper
2016	2016	East	4th	17	17	.500	Won First Round (Seattle, 1–0); Lost Second Round (Chicago, 0–1)	Michael Cooper
2017	2017	East	5th	12	22	.353	Did not qualify	Michael Cooper
2018	2018	East	1st	23	11	.676	Lost Semifinals (Washington, 2–3)	Nicki Collen
2019	2019	East	6th	8	26	.235	Did not qualify	Nicki Collen
2020	2020	East	4th	7	15	.318	Did not qualify	Nicki Collen
2021	2021	East	5th	8	24	.250	Did not qualify	Mike Petersen (6–13); Darius Taylor (2–11)
2022	2022	East	5th	14	22	.389	Did not qualify	Tanisha Wright
2023	2023	East	3rd	19	21	.475	Lost First Round (Dallas, 0–2)	Tanisha Wright
2024	2024	East	3rd	15	25	.375	Lost First Round (New York, 0–2)	Tanisha Wright
2025	2025	East	1st	30	14	.682	Lost First Round (Indiana, 1–2)	Karl Smesko
2026	2026	East	1st	30	14	.682	Won First Round (Washington, 2–0); Won Second Round (New York, 3–0); Lost WNBA Finals (Golden State, 3–4)	Karl Smesko
Regular season				299	333	.473	3 Conference Championships	
Playoffs				26	33	.441	0 WNBA Championships	

== Players ==
=== Current roster ===
Atlanta Dream roster
Players
Coaches

Pos.	No.	Nat.	Name	Height	Weight	DOB	From	Yrs
G/F	24	(North Macedonia)	Bonner, DeWanna	6' 4" (1.93m)	140 lb (64kg)	1987-08-21	Auburn	16
G	20	(Australia)	Borlase, Isobel	5' 11" (1.8m)		2004-09-12	Lake Ginninderra	R
G	3	(United States)	Canada, Jordin	5' 6" (1.68m)	135 lb (61kg)	1995-08-11	UCLA	8
G	15	(United States)	Gray, Allisha	6' 0" (1.83m)	167 lb (76kg)	1995-01-12	South Carolina	9
F	00	(United States)	Hillmon, Naz	6' 2" (1.88m)	190 lb (86kg)	2000-04-05	Michigan	4
F	10	(United States)	Howard, Rhyne	6' 2" (1.88m)	175 lb (79kg)	2000-04-29	Kentucky	4
C	42	(United States)	Jones, Brionna (injured)	6' 3" (1.91m)	215 lb (98kg)	1995-12-18	Maryland	9
F	23	(Mali)	Koné, Sika	6' 3" (1.91m)	180 lb (82kg)	2002-07-13	Mali	3
G	21	(United States)	Nivar, Indya	5' 10" (1.78m)		2004-01-16	North Carolina	R
C	11	(Kenya)	Okot, Madina	6' 6" (1.98m)		2004-08-23	South Carolina	R
G	2	(United States)	Paopao, Te-Hina	5' 9" (1.75m)		2002-08-21	South Carolina	1
F	5	(United States)	Reese, Angel	6' 4" (1.93m)	165 lb (75kg)	2002-05-06	LSU	2
G	0	(Italy)	Villa, Matilde	5' 7" (1.7m)	140 lb (64kg)	2004-12-09	Italy	R
G	33	(United States)	Walker-Kimbrough, Shatori	5' 9" (1.75m)	140 lb (64kg)	1995-05-18	Maryland	9

Head coach
(United States) Karl Smesko (Kent State)
Assistant coaches
(United States) Camryn Brown (High Point)
(United States) Chelsea Lyles (Florida Gulf Coast)
(United States) Brandi Poole (Sewanee)
(United States) LaToya Sanders (North Carolina)
Athletic trainer
(United States) Katie Buria (Arkansas)

Legend

- (C) Team captain
- (DP) Unsigned draft pick
- (FA) Free agent
- (S) Suspended
- Injured

WNBA roster page

East
ATL
CHI
CON
IND
NY
TOR
WAS
West
DAL
GS
LV
LA
MIN
PHO
POR
SEA

=== Other rights owned ===
Nationality	Name	Years pro	Last played	Drafted
(Hungary)	Dalma Ivanyi	5	2006	1999

=== Former players ===
- Kalani Brown (2020–2021), currently with the Las Vegas Aces
- Izi Castro Marques (2008–2011)
- Érika de Souza (2008–2015)
- Katie Feenstra-Mattera (2008)
- Lindsey Harding (2011–2012), currently an assistant coach of the Los Angeles Lakers
- Tiffany Hayes (2012-2022), currently with the Golden State Valkyries
- Chamique Holdsclaw (2009)
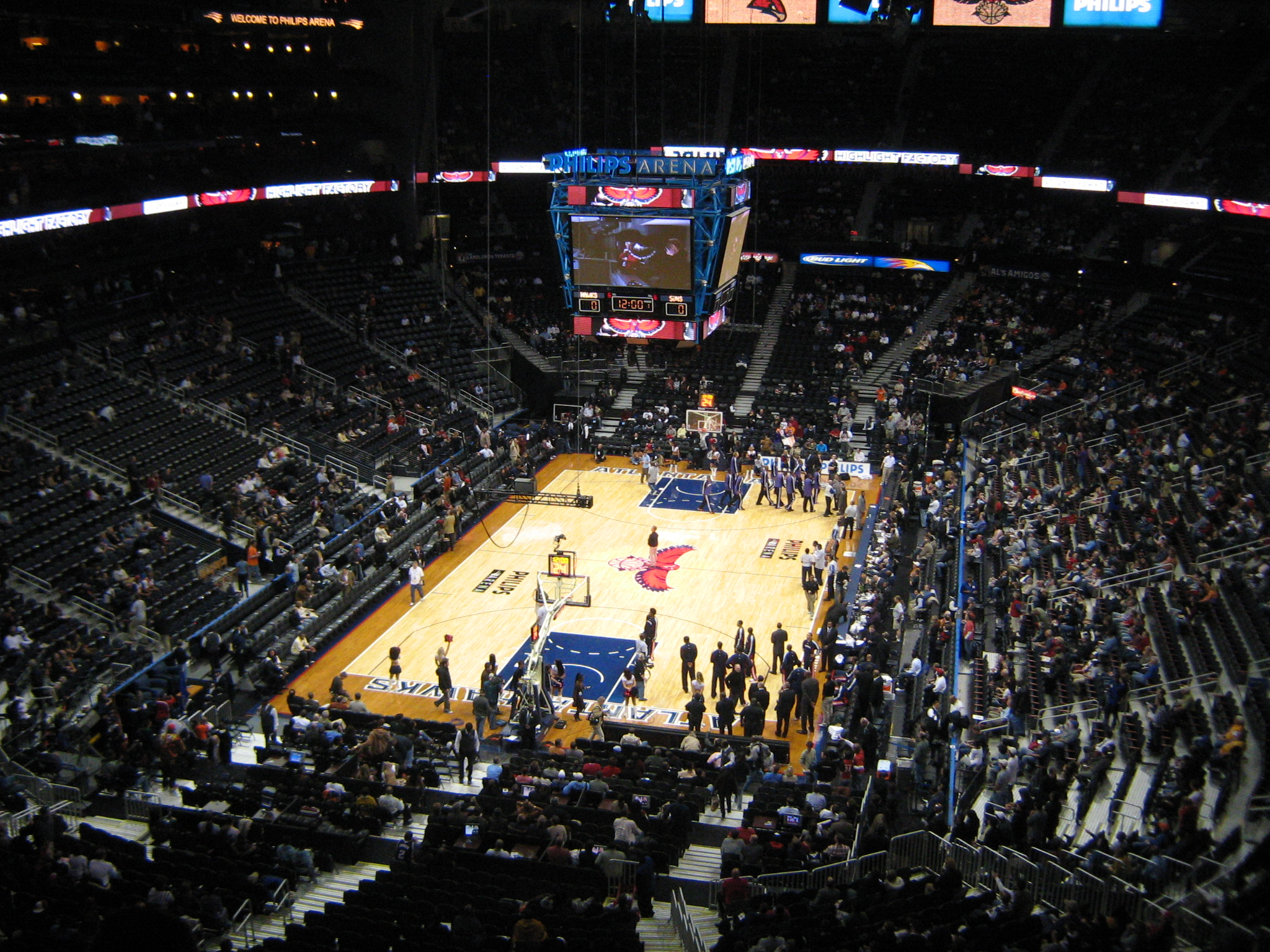
  State Farm Arena
- Ivory Latta (2008–2009)
- Shalee Lehning (2009–2011)
- Betty Lennox (2008)
- Camille Little (2008), currently an assistant coach with the Dallas Wings
- Sancho Lyttle (2009–2017)
- Kristen Mann (2008)
- Angel McCoughtry (2009–2019)
- Coco Miller (2009–2011)
- DeLisha Milton-Jones (2014–2015)
- Shoni Schimmel (2014–2015)
- Michelle Snow (2009)
- Nikki Teasley (2008)

== Coaches and staff ==
=== Owners ===
- Ron Terwilliger (2008–2009)
- Kathy Betty (2010)
- Dream Too LLC, composed of Mary Brock and Kelly Loeffler (2011–2021)
- Larry Gottesdiener, Suzanne Abair, and Renee Montgomery (2021–present)

=== Executives ===
- President & COO – Bill Bolen (2008–2009)
- Co-owner & CEO – Kathy Betty (2010–2011)
- CEO – Peter J. Canalichio (2012)
- CEO – Ashley Preisinger (2012–2014)
- President & CEO – Theresa Wenzel (2014–2016)
- President & General Manager – Chris Sienko (2017–2021)
- President & COO – Morgan Shaw Parker (2022–present)

=== Head coaches ===
Atlanta Dream head coaches
Name	Start	End	Seasons	Regular season				Playoffs			
Name	Start	End	Seasons	W	L	PCT	G	W	L	PCT	G
Marynell Meadors	November 27, 2007	August 27, 2012	5	73	87	.456	160	8	9	.471	17
Fred Williams	August 27, 2012	October 18, 2013	2	24	20	.545	44	5	6	.455	11
Michael Cooper	November 21, 2013	September 5, 2017	4	63	73	.463	136	2	3	.400	5
Nicki Collen	October 30, 2017	May 3, 2021	3	38	52	.422	90	2	3	.400	5
Mike Petersen (interim)	May 3, 2021	July 24, 2021	1	6	13	.316	19	0	0	–	0
Darius Taylor (interim)	July 24, 2021	October 12, 2021	1	2	11	.154	13	0	0	–	0
Tanisha Wright	October 12, 2021	October 2, 2024	3	48	68	.414	116	0	4	.000	4
Karl Smesko	November 13, 2024	present	1	30	14	.682	44	1	2	.333	3

=== General managers ===
- Marynell Meadors (2008–2012)
- Fred Williams (2012–2013)
- Angela Taylor (2014–2016)
- Chris Sienko (2017–2021)
- Dan Padover (2021–present)

=== Assistant coaches ===
- Katy Steding (2008)
- Fred Williams (2008–2012)
- Sue Panek (2008–2011)
- Carol Ross (2009–2011)
- Joe Ciampi (2012–2013)
- Julie Plank (2013)
- Karleen Thompson (2013–2017)
- Teresa Edwards (2014)
- Tellis Frank (2015)
- Miles Cooper (2016–2017)
- Mike Petersen (2017–2020)
- Darius Taylor (2017–2021)
- La'Keshia Frett (2021–2022)
- Daynia La-Force (2021–2022)
- Christie Sides (2022)
- Paul Goriss (2022–2024)
- Barbara Turner (2022–2024)
- Vickie Johnson (2023–2024)
- LaToya Sanders (2025–present)
- Brandi Poole (2025–present)
- Camryn Brown (2025–present)
- Chelsea Lyles (2025–present)

== Statistics ==
Atlanta Dream statistics
2000s

Season	Individual			Team vs Opponents		
Season	PPG	RPG	APG	PPG	RPG	FG%
2008	B. Lennox (17.5)	E. de Souza (6.6)	I. Latta (3.6)	74.5 vs 84.7	31.7 vs 37.2	.396 vs .450
2009	I. Castro Marques (14.4)	E. de Souza (9.1)	S. Lehning (3.7)	84.1 vs 82.3	37.0 vs 34.5	.449 vs .421

2010s

Season	Individual			Team vs Opponents		
Season	PPG	RPG	APG	PPG	RPG	FG%
2010	A. McCoughtry (21.1)	S. Lyttle (9.9)	S. Lehning (4.8)	85.4 vs 83.1	38.8 vs 34.1	.444 vs .435
2011	A. McCoughtry (21.6)	E. de Souza (7.5)	L. Harding (4.8)	82.5 vs 80.8	36.1 vs 34.6	.446 vs .431
2012	A. McCoughtry (21.4)	E. de Souza (8.2)	L. Harding (4.5)	78.6 vs 75.8	34.8 vs 34.5	.434 vs .415
2013	A. McCoughtry (21.5)	E. de Souza (9.9)	A. McCoughtry (4.4)	76.9 vs 75.4	35.6 vs 35.7	.423 vs .420
2014	A. McCoughtry (18.5)	S. Lyttle (9.0)	C. Dumerc (4.0)	80.6 vs 78.6	37.7 vs 34.3	.433 vs .429
2015	A. McCoughtry (20.1)	S. Lyttle (8.3)	S. Schimmel (3.2)	77.8 vs 79.8	34.6 vs 32.1	.411 vs .436
2016	A. McCoughtry (19.5)	E. Williams (8.1)	L. Clarendon (3.5)	81.8 vs 84.0	36.5 vs 34.9	.422 vs .435
2017	T. Hayes (16.3)	E. Williams (7.2)	L. Clarendon (6.6)	78.9 vs 82.7	35.1 vs 36.0	.409 vs .438
2018	T. Hayes (17.2)	J. Breland (7.9)	R. Montgomery (3.7)	81.8 vs 79.5	35.8 vs 36.5	.426 vs .423
2019	T. Hayes (14.7)	J. Breland (7.3)	A. Bentley (3.0)	71.2 vs 78.9	36.1 vs 39.5	.371 vs .416

2020s

Season	Individual			Team vs Opponents		
Season	PPG	RPG	APG	PPG	RPG	FG%
2020	C. Carter (17.4)	M. Billings (8.5)	B. Laney (4.0)	81.0 vs 87.6	34.9 vs 35.0	.442 vs .457
2021	C. Williams (16.5)	C. Williams (6.8)	C. Williams (4.0)	78.7 vs 84.3	24.4 vs 29.6	.417 vs .457
2022	R. Howard (16.2)	M. Billings (6.3)	E. Wheeler (3.9)	78.5 vs 81.5	35.5 vs 33.9	.420 vs .432
2023	R. Howard (17.5)	Ch. Parker (6.7)	R. Howard (3.5)	82.5 vs 84.0	36.1 vs 35.7	.428 vs .430
2024	R. Howard (17.3)	T. Charles (9.6)	J. Canada (5.8)	77.0 vs 79.8	36.1 vs 34.6	.408 vs .429
2025	A. Gray (18.4)	B. Jones (7.3)	J. Canada (5.7)	84.4 vs 76.8	36.6 vs 31.4	.443 vs .429

== Media coverage and social media ==
All Dream games are broadcast across WANF-TV, WPCH-TV & Peachtree Sports Network (except for national exclusives). Some Dream games are broadcast nationally on ESPN, ESPN2, ABC, Ion Television, CBS, NBC, Amazon Prime Video, USA, NBCSN, and NBA TV.

In late 2024/early 2025, the team gained publicity as a video of Angel Wiley (the stepson of Dream Co-Owner Renee Montgomery) dancing courtside at an Atlanta Dream game went viral on social media platforms Instagram and TikTok. The video was nicknamed "chopped chin" in reference to his elongated chin.

== All-time notes ==
=== Regular season attendance ===
- A sellout for a basketball game at State Farm Arena has differed slightly throughout its history:
  - 18,729 from 2008 to 2011
  - 18,371 in 2012
  - 18,238 in 2013
  - 18,118 in 2014
  - 18,047 in 2015 and 2016
  - 16,600 in 2019
  - 17,044 in 2026
- A sellout for a basketball game at McCamish Pavilion has been 8,600 since 2012, before the Dream temporarily moved in for 2017 and 2018.
- A sellout for a basketball game at the Gateway Center Arena is 3,500 since 2021.

Regular season all-time attendance
Year	Average	High	Low	Sellouts	Total for year	WNBA game average
2008	8,468 (6th)	11,609	5,844	0	143,950	7,948
2009	7,102 (11th)	11,304	5,424	0	120,737	8,039
2010	6,293 (10th)	9,598	2,515	0	106,983	7,834
2011	6,487 (10th)	8,038	4,423	0	110,278	7,954
2012	5,453 (11th)	8,872	2,813	0	92,708	7,452
2013	5,853 (11th)	10,155	4,019	0	99,493	7,531
2014	5,864 (11th)	9,439	3,496	0	99,687	7,578
2015	6,122 (9th)	9,814	3,856	0	104,080	7,184
2016	5,614 (11th)	10,345	3,611	0	95,431	7,655
2017	4,452 (11th)	7,413	3,359	0	75,684	7,716
2018	4,194 (11th)	6,561	2,830	0	71,304	6,721
2019	4,270 (11th)	7,047	2,119	0	72,596	6,535
2020	Due to the COVID-19 pandemic, the season was played in Bradenton, Florida without fans.					
2021	1,347 (10th)	2,537	561	0	21,549	2,636
2022	2,752 (11th)	3,138	1,268	8	44,030	5,679
2023	3,006 (12th)	3,209	2,394	12	60,128	6,615
2024	4,744 (12th)	17,608 (Note: The Dream played two 2024 home games at State Farm Arena.)	3,255	20	94,877	9,807
2025	4,480 (13th)	17,044 (Note: The Dream played two 2025 home games at State Farm Arena.)	3,265	0	98,560	10,986

=== Draft picks ===
- 2008 Expansion Draft: Carla Thomas, Érika de Souza, Katie Feenstra, Roneeka Hodges, Ann Strother, LaToya Thomas, Kristen Mann, Ann Wauters, Jennifer Lacy, Kristin Haynie, Chantelle Anderson, Betty Lennox, Yelena Leuchanka
- 2008: Tamera Young (8), Morenike Atunrase (24), Danielle Hood (32)
- 2009 Houston Dispersal Draft: Sancho Lyttle (1)
- 2009: Angel McCoughtry (1), Shalee Lehning (25), Jessica Morrow (27)
- 2010 Sacramento Dispersal Draft: selection waived
- 2010: Chanel Mokango (9), Brigitte Ardossi (21), Brittainey Raven (33)
- 2011: Ta'Shia Phillips (8), Rachel Jarry (18), Kelsey Bolte (32)
- 2012: Tiffany Hayes (14), Isabelle Yacoubou (32, ineligible)
- 2013: Alex Bentley (13), Anne Marie Armstrong (31)
- 2014: Shoni Schimmel (8), Inga Orekhova (18), Cassie Harberts (20)
- 2015: Samantha Logic (10), Ariel Massengale (29), Lauren Okafor (34)
- 2016: Bria Holmes (9), Rachel Hollivay (13), Courtney Walker (16), Niya Johnson (28)
- 2017: Brittney Sykes (7), Jordan Reynolds (19), Oderah Chidom (31)
- 2018: Monique Billings (15), Kristy Wallace (16), Mackenzie Engram (27)
- 2019: Brianna Turner (11), Maite Cazorla (23), Li Yueru (35)
- 2020: Chennedy Carter (4), Brittany Brewer (17), Mikayla Pivec (25), Kobi Thornton (27)
- 2021: Aari McDonald (3), Raquel Carrera (15), Lindsey Pulliam (27)
- 2022: Rhyne Howard (1), Naz Hillmon (15)
- 2023: Haley Jones (6), Laeticia Amihere (8), Leigha Brown (15)
- 2024: Nyadiew Puoch (12), Isobel Borlase (20), Matilde Villa (32)
- 2025: Te-Hina Paopao (18), Taylor Thierry (36)
- 2026: Madina Okot (13), Indya Nivar (28), Kejia Ran (43)

=== Trades ===
- February 6, 2008: The Dream traded LaToya Thomas and the 18th pick in the 2008 WNBA draft to the Detroit Shock in exchange for Ivory Latta.
- February 6, 2008: The Dream traded the fourth pick in the 2008 WNBA draft and Roneeka Hodges to the Seattle Storm for Izi Castro Marques and the eighth pick in the draft.
- February 6, 2008: The Dream acquired the 24th pick in the 2008 WNBA draft from the Indiana Fever in exchange for agreeing not to select specific unprotected Fever players in the expansion draft.
- April 9, 2008: The Dream traded Ann Wauters, draft rights to Morenike Atunrase, and a second-round pick in the 2009 WNBA draft to the San Antonio Silver Stars in exchange for Camille Little, draft rights to Chioma Nnamaka, and a first-round pick in the 2009 WNBA draft.
- June 22, 2008: The Dream traded Camille Little to the Seattle Storm in exchange for a second-round pick in the 2009 WNBA draft.
- July 4, 2008: The Dream traded Kristen Mann to the Indiana Fever in exchange for Alison Bales.
- December 17, 2008: The Dream traded the 13th pick in the 2009 WNBA draft to the Los Angeles Sparks in exchange for the rights to Chamique Holdsclaw.
- January 21, 2009: The Dream traded Alison Bales to the Phoenix Mercury in exchange for the 18th pick in the 2009 Draft.
- April 9, 2009: The Dream traded the 18th pick in the 2009 WNBA draft to the Detroit Shock in exchange for Ashley Shields.
- August 12, 2009: The Dream traded Tamera Young to the Chicago Sky in exchange for Armintie Price.
- March 11, 2010: The Dream traded Michelle Snow to the San Antonio Silver Stars in exchange for Dalma Ivanyi and the right to swap second-round picks in the 2010 Draft.
- April 11, 2011: The Dream traded Rachel Jarry and second-round pick in 2012 WNBA draft to the Minnesota Lynx in exchange for Felicia Chester.
- April 11, 2011: The Dream traded Ta'Shia Phillips, Kelly Miller and first-round pick in 2012 WNBA draft to the Washington Mystics in exchange for Lindsey Harding and second-round pick in 2012 Draft.
- February 19, 2013: The Dream traded the 7th and 19th pick in the 2013 WNBA draft to the Washington Mystics in exchange for Jasmine Thomas and second-round pick in 2013 Draft.
- March 12, 2014: The Dream traded Alex Bentley and the 32nd pick in the 2014 WNBA draft to the Connecticut Sun in exchange for Matee Ajavon and the 18th pick in the 2014 Draft from the Washington Mystics.
- May 7, 2014: The Dream traded Courtney Clements to the Chicago Sky in exchange for Swin Cash.
- July 9, 2014: The Dream traded Swin Cash to the New York Liberty in exchange for DeLisha Milton-Jones.
- April 16, 2015: The Dream traded Jasmine Thomas to the Connecticut Sun in exchange for Brittany Hrynko.
- July 27, 2015: The Dream traded Érika de Souza to the Chicago Sky in exchange for Damiris Dantas, Reshanda Gray, and a first-round pick in 2016 Draft from the Minnesota Lynx. Minnesota received Sylvia Fowles and a second-round pick in 2016 WNBA draft from Chicago as part of this trade.
- February 3, 2016: The Dream traded the 4th pick in the 2016 Draft to the Connecticut Sun in exchange for Elizabeth Williams.
- May 2, 2016: The Dream traded Shoni Schimmel to the New York Liberty in exchange for second-round pick in 2017 Draft.
- January 26, 2017: The Dream traded Reshanda Gray to the Connecticut Sun in exchange for Aneika Henry-Morello.
- April 12, 2018: The Dream receive 15th pick in 2018 WNBA draft and a second-round pick in 2019 WNBA draft in exchange for Bria Holmes.
- July 9, 2018: The Dream receive Alex Bentley in exchange for Layshia Clarendon and a second-round pick in 2019 WNBA draft.
- May 16, 2019: The Dream receive Dallas' third-round pick in the 2020 WNBA draft in exchange for Imani McGee-Stafford.
- February 10, 2020: The Dream traded Brittney Sykes and Marie Gülich to Los Angeles in exchange for Kalani Brown.
- February 19, 2020: The Dream traded Jessica Breland and Nia Coffey to Phoenix as part of a three-way trade with Connecticut in exchange for Courtney Williams and the 17th pick in the 2020 WNBA draft.
- February 21, 2021: The Dream traded their third-round pick in the 2022 Draft in exchange for Yvonne Turner.
- January 31, 2022: The Dream traded a third-round pick in the 2023 Draft to the Phoenix Mercury in exchange for Kia Vaughn.
- February 5, 2022: The Dream traded Chennedy Carter and the rights to Li Yueru to the Los Angeles Sparks in exchange for Erica Wheeler, a second-round pick in the 2022 WNBA Draft, and a first-round pick in the 2023 WNBA Draft.
- April 6, 2022: The Dream traded the 3rd and 14th overall picks in the 2022 WNBA Draft, and the right to swap first-round picks with the Los Angeles Sparks to the Washington Mystics in exchange for the 1st Overall Pick in the 2022 WNBA Draft.
- June 8, 2022: The Dream traded Megan Walker and the rights to Raquel Carrera to the New York Liberty in exchange for AD Durr.
- January 12, 2023: The Dream traded Kristy Wallace to Indiana in exchange for Danielle Robinson.
- January 21, 2023: The Dream traded the third pick in the 2023 Draft and a first round pick in the 2025 Draft in exchange for Allisha Gray.
- February 9, 2023: The Dream traded Tiffany Hayes to Connecticut in exchange for the sixth pick in the 2023 Draft.
- May 16, 2023: The Dream traded Leigha Brown to Connecticut in exchange for a third round pick in the 2025 Draft.
- February 1, 2024: The Dream traded the 8th pick in the 2024 Draft and Aari McDonald to Los Angeles in exchange for Jordin Canada and the 12th pick in the 2024 Draft.
- May 4, 2024: The Dream traded their third round pick in the 2025 Draft to Dallas in exchange for Crystal Dangerfield.
- April 6, 2026: The Dream traded their first round pick in the 2027 Draft and their first round pick in the 2028 Draft to Chicago in exchange for Angel Reese and a second round pick swap in the 2028 Draft.

=== All-Stars ===
- 2008: No All-Star Game
- 2009: Érika de Souza, Sancho Lyttle
- 2010: Izi Castro Marques, Sancho Lyttle, Angel McCoughtry
- 2011: Angel McCoughtry
- 2012: No All-Star Game
- 2013: Angel McCoughtry, Érika de Souza
- 2014: Angel McCoughtry, Érika de Souza, Shoni Schimmel
- 2015: Angel McCoughtry, Shoni Schimmel
- 2016: No All-Star Game
- 2017: Layshia Clarendon, Tiffany Hayes, Elizabeth Williams
- 2018: Angel McCoughtry
- 2019: None Selected
- 2020: No All-Star Game
- 2021: Courtney Williams
- 2022: Rhyne Howard
- 2023: Allisha Gray, Rhyne Howard, Cheyenne Parker
- 2024: Allisha Gray
- 2025: Allisha Gray, Brionna Jones
- 2026: Allisha Gray, Rhyne Howard, Angel Reese

=== Olympians ===
- 2012: Angel McCoughtry, Érika de Souza (BRA)
- 2016: Angel McCoughtry
- 2024: Laeticia Amihere (CAN), Rhyne Howard, (USA 3x3), Iliana Rupert (FRA)

=== Honors and awards ===
- 2009 Rookie of the Year: Angel McCoughtry
- 2009 Coach of the Year: Marynell Meadors
- 2009 All-Defensive Second Team: Angel McCoughtry
- 2009 All-Rookie Team: Angel McCoughtry
- 2010 All-WNBA Second Team: Angel McCoughtry
- 2010 All-Defensive First Team: Angel McCoughtry
- 2010 All-Defensive Second Team: Sancho Lyttle
- 2011 All-WNBA First Team: Angel McCoughtry
- 2011 All-Defensive First Team: Angel McCoughtry
- 2011 All-Defensive Second Team: Sancho Lyttle, Armintie Price
- 2012 Peak Performer (Points): Angel McCoughtry
- 2012 All-Defensive First Team: Sancho Lyttle
- 2012 All-Defensive Second Team: Armintie Price
- 2012 All-Rookie Team: Tiffany Hayes
- 2013 Peak Performer (Points): Angel McCoughtry
- 2013 All-WNBA Second Team: Angel McCoughtry
- 2013 All-Defensive First Team: Angel McCoughtry, Armintie Price
- 2013 All-Defensive Second Team: Érica de Souza
- 2013 All-Rookie Team: Alex Bentley
- 2014 WNBA All-Star Game MVP: Shoni Schimmel
- 2014 All-WNBA Second Team: Angel McCoughtry
- 2014 All-Defensive First Team: Angel McCoughtry, Sancho Lyttle
- 2015 All-WNBA First Team: Angel McCoughtry
- 2015 All-Defensive First Team: Angel McCoughtry
- 2015 All-Defensive Second Team: Sancho Lyttle
- 2015 Kim Perrot Sportsmanship Award: DeLisha Milton-Jones
- 2016 Most Improved Player: Elizabeth Williams
- 2016 All-Defensive First Team: Angel McCoughtry
- 2017 All-Rookie Team: Brittney Sykes
- 2018 All-WNBA First Team: Tiffany Hayes
- 2018 All-Defensive First Team: Jessica Breland
- 2018 All-Defensive Second Team: Tiffany Hayes
- 2018 Coach of the Year: Nicki Collen
- 2018 Executive of the Year: Chris Sienko
- 2020 Most Improved Player: Betnijah Laney
- 2020 All-Rookie Team: Chennedy Carter
- 2020 All-Defensive First Team: Betnijah Laney, Elizabeth Williams
- 2021 All-Rookie Team: Aari McDonald
- 2022 Rookie of the Year: Rhyne Howard
- 2022 All-Rookie Team: Rhyne Howard
- 2025 All-WNBA First Team: Allisha Gray
- 2025 Sixth Player of the Year: Naz Hillmon
- 2025 All-Defensive Second Team: Rhyne Howard
- 2025 Executive of the Year: Dan Padover

== Notes ==
Preceded by Indiana Fever	WNBA Eastern Conference Champions; 2010 (First title); 2011 (Second title)	Succeeded by Indiana Fever
Preceded by Indiana Fever	WNBA Eastern Conference Champions; 2013 (Third title)	Succeeded by Chicago Sky
