= Brandi Poole =

American basketball coach

Atlanta Dream
- Position: Assistant Coach
- League: WNBA

Personal information
- Born: November 22 Clarksville, Tennessee, U.S.

Career information
- College: University of the South (1993–1997)
- Coaching career: 1999–present

Career history

Coaching
- 1999–2000: West Virginia Wesleyan (Asst.)
- 2000–2001: West Virginia (Asst.)
- 2001–2012: Bowling Green (Asst.)
- 2012–2014: Indiana (Asst.)
- 2014–2018: Texas Tech (Asst.)
- 2018–2022: Connecticut Sun (Asst.)
- 2023–2024: Dallas Wings (Asst.)
- 2025–present: Atlanta Dream (Asst.)

Brandi Poole (born November 22) is an American professional basketball coach who is an assistant coach for the Atlanta Dream of the Women's National Basketball Association (WNBA). Poole has previously spent time in the WNBA as an assistant coach with the Connecticut Sun and Dallas Wings, and as the Director of Basketball Operations with the Portland Fire. She has also served time at the NCAA Division I level with Bowling Green, Indiana, Texas Tech, and West Virginia.

== College career ==
Poole attended University of the South and was a member of the women's basketball program. As a player, Poole was a three-time all-conference honoree and a three-year co-captain. She still ranks among the school's top 10 in career points and rebounds.

== Coaching career ==
=== Portland Fire ===
Poole started her career as the Director of Operations for the WNBA's Portland Fire in 2000.

=== West Virginia ===
Following her stint with the Fire, Poole got into the coaching side and spent one year at West Virginia.

=== Bowling Green ===
Poole left West Virginia and joined Bowling Green, where she spent the 2001–2012 seasons there. At BGSU, Poole helped win eight straight MAC regular-season titles, five MAC Tournament Championships, reach five NCAA tournaments, and become the only team in conference history to advance to the Sweet 16. BGSU set a conference record for wins in a season (31), had nine straight seasons with at least 21 wins, including four seasons with 28 or more wins, and had a winning percentage of .737 (258–92).

=== Indiana ===
Poole became an assistant coach at Indiana University in 2012. As recruiting coordinator, Poole helped assemble a top-30 class heading into the 2013–14 season.

=== Texas Tech ===
Poole was hired in September 2014 by Candi Whitaker and the Texas Tech women's basketball team. Whitaker stated when she hired Poole, "I was impressed with how hard she works, how she builds relationships and how she's represented each program she's been with on and off the court." Poole spent four seasons with the Lady Raiders before she left to become an assistant coach in the WNBA.

=== Connecticut Sun ===
Poole became an assistant coach with the Connecticut Sun on February 20, 2018. While with the Sun, Poole helped the team advance to the WNBA Finals two times during her tenure (2019, 2022). Connecticut tallied a record of 105 – 53 (.665), including a league-best 26–6 record during the 2021 season. The Sun also won 16 playoff games during her five seasons, tying Seattle for most wins during that span. Following the 2020 season, Poole was re-signed as an assistant coach to a multi-year deal to stay on staff. In the 2021 season with the Sun, Poole served as the acting head coach while Miller had to take a temporary leave to attend to a family matter.

=== Dallas Wings ===
Poole took a position with the Dallas Wings as an assistant coach on Latricia Trammell's staff in 2022.

=== Atlanta Dream ===
On January 6, 2025, Poole was announced as an assistant coach of the Atlanta Dream under head coach Karl Smesko.
