= Ron Terwilliger =

American housing developer

Personal details
- Born: 1941 (age 84–85) Washington, D.C., U.S.
- Party: Republican
- Education: United States Naval Academy (BS); Harvard University (MBA)

J. Ronald Terwilliger (born 1941) is the Chairman Emeritus and retired chief executive officer of Trammell Crow Residential, and the founder and chairman of the J. Ronald Terwilliger Foundation for Housing America's Families.

== Early life and education ==
Terwilliger graduated from the United States Naval Academy in 1963 with honors. After serving five years in the United States Navy, he attended Harvard University where he received his MBA with High Distinction from the Harvard Graduate School of Business, and was elected a Baker Scholar.

== Career ==
From 1986 until 2008 Terwilliger was the CEO of Trammell Crow Residential, the largest developer of multi-family housing in the United States. Since 2013 he has served as non-executive Chairman of Terwilliger Pappas Multifamily Partners which focuses on rental apartment development in the Southeast markets.

He also chairs the executive committee of the J. Ronald Terwilliger Foundation for Housing America's Families, which he established in 2014 to "recalibrate" U.S. federal housing policy.

== Chairmanships and memberships ==
In addition to chairing his eponymous housing foundation, Terwilliger was elected as chairman of the board at Enterprise Community Partners, Inc on June 23, 2010. He has been a member of the Board of Trustees of Enterprise Community Partners since 2007. He is Chairman Emeritus of the International Board of Directors of Habitat for Humanity International where he currently serves as Global Campaign Chair. He is also Chairman of the I Have a Dream Foundation. Other boards on which he serves are the U.S. Naval Academy Foundation, the Urban Institute, Horatio Alger Association and Colony Starwood Homes.

Terwilliger's past board participation includes Chairman Emeritus for the Wharton Real Estate Center, Chairman of the National Association of Homebuilders Multifamily Leadership Board, Chairman of the Atlanta Neighborhood Development Partnership, as well as Chairman of Urban Land Institute where he founded The Terwilliger Center for Workforce Housing.

== Awards ==
- 2006 Hearthstone Builder Humanitarian Award
- 2008 National Association of Homebuilders Hall of Fame Award
- 2009 United States Naval Academy Distinguished Graduate Award
- 2012 National Patriotism Award
- 2013 ULI J.C. Nichols Prize
- 2014 Horatio Alger Award

== Philanthropy ==
Terwilliger's philanthropic focus is largely on housing, in particular the need to provide decent affordable housing.

In 2014, he established the J. Ronald Terwilliger Foundation for Housing America's Families to contribute to federal housing policy.

Terwilliger's largest philanthropic efforts have gone towards helping Habitat for Humanity International. He has served on the board of directors for Habitat for Humanity since October 2000, currently serving as Chairman Emeritus. Terwilliger made a $100 million legacy gift, making it the largest donation from and individual in Habitat for Humanity's history. His donation will help an estimated 60,000 low-income families around the world to improve their housing. He has also established and funded the J. Ronald Terwilliger Leveraged Impact Fund, which makes annual distributions to help support affordable-housing efforts.

Terwilliger's other philanthropic contributions include a $5 million gift to establish the ULI Terwilliger Center for Housing and a $5 million gift to the Enterprise Foundation targeted to create 2,000 affordable homes annually. He has also pledged and contributed more than $20 million to the U.S. Naval Academy. His gift of $2 million to the 'I Have A Dream' Foundation will help low income children graduate from high school and attend post-secondary education.

Terwilliger and his brother Bruce, a 1964 Naval Academy graduate, are both contributors to Naval Academy athletics. The academy baseball stadium, Terwilliger Brothers Field at Max Bishop Stadium, is named in part for them. The scoreboard at Navy–Marine Corps Memorial Stadium, Navy's football stadium, is also named for the brothers.

Terwillinger donated $15 million of the $25 million needed to build the Naval Academy's Ron Terwilliger Center for Student-Athletes, "a 25,000-square foot facility that celebrates the history and tradition of Navy athletics while simultaneously serving as a testament to the academy's commitment to the physical development of the entire Brigade of Midshipmen."

== Personal life ==
Terwilliger has two daughters from his first marriage, and a stepdaughter and a stepson from his second marriage. He also has two granddaughters and two grandsons.
