= Dan Padover =

American Basketball executive

Atlanta Dream
- Positions: General Manager; Executive Vice President of Basketball Operations
- League: WNBA

Personal information
- Born: Somers Point, New Jersey, U.S.

Career information
- College: University of Connecticut; New York University

Career highlights
- 3× WNBA Basketball Executive of the Year (2020, 2021, 2025)

Dan Padover is an American basketball executive who is the General Manager and Executive Vice President of Basketball Operations of the Atlanta Dream of the Women's National Basketball Association (WNBA). He previously worked for the New York Liberty in a multitude of roles, before moving to the Las Vegas Aces as the General Manager.

== Early life ==
Padover attended University of Connecticut for his undergraduate degree in psychology and business administration, while then attending New York University's Stern School of Business for business administration.

He worked two seasons with the Rutgers Scarlet Knights women's basketball team as their video coordinator. He also interned for the Philadelphia 76ers in their video department.

== Executive career ==
=== New York Liberty ===
Padover began his career in the WNBA with the New York Liberty by being their video coordinator in 2012. He was promoted numerous times while with the Liberty and was a part of being their Basketball Operations Manager, Director of Basketball Operations, and finally their Vice President of Basketball Operations. During his time with New York, the Liberty made the playoffs four times, going to the Conference Finals in 2015.

=== Las Vegas Aces ===
Padover joined the Aces's franchise in 2018, reuniting with former head coach Bill Laimbeer. The two worked previously together while both with the Liberty. He was named the General Manager in 2019. Following the 2020 season, Padover was named the WNBA Basketball Executive of the Year Award. Padover won the Executive of the Year Award again in 2021, after signing Chelsea Gray, Riquna Williams, and Kiah Stokes to help the Aces's efforts during the year.

=== Atlanta Dream ===
In October 2021, Padover left the Aces organization to become the General Manager and Executive Vice President for the Atlanta Dream. One of the first things he did with the Dream was trade for the #1 overall pick in the 2022 WNBA draft. This allowed the Dream to select Rhyne Howard, who would be named the WNBA Rookie of the Year. After one season with the Dream, Padover and head coach Tanisha Wright signed five-year contract extensions with the Dream. On September 23, 2025, Padover was named the WNBA Basketball Executive of the Year Award.

== See also ==
- Atlanta Dream
