= Darius Taylor =

American basketball coach and former player

Texas A&M Aggies
- Title: Chief of Basketball Strategy and Roster Management
- League: Southeastern Conference

Personal information
- Born: October 2, 1978 (age 48) Chicago, Illinois, U.S.
- Listed height: 6 ft 4 in (1.93 m)
- Listed weight: 195 lb (88 kg)

Career information
- High school: Lake View (Lake View, Chicago, Illinois)
- College: Michigan (1996–2000)
- Position: Small forward / point guard
- Coaching career: 2004–2015, 2017–present

Career history

Coaching
- 2004–2010: Temple (assistant)
- 2010–2015: South Carolina (assistant)
- 2017–2021: Atlanta Dream (assistant)
- 2021: Atlanta Dream (interim)

Darius Taylor (born October 2, 1978) is an American basketball coach, executive, and former player who is currently the Chief of Basketball Strategy and Roster Management for the Texas A&M Aggies women's basketball team.

== Career ==
Taylor began his coaching career as an assistant coach at Temple in 2004 under Dawn Staley. He was later an assistant coach at South Carolina, also under Staley. He left South Carolina in 2015 after his fiancée Joni Taylor was named the head coach at Georgia.

=== Atlanta Dream ===
Taylor was named an assistant coach for the Atlanta Dream of the WNBA on December 27, 2017. He was named interim head coach on July 24, 2021 after previous interim head coach Mike Petersen resigned due to health issues.

=== Connecticut Sun ===
Taylor was named general manager of the Connecticut Sun on November 29, 2022. On December 3, 2024, the Sun announced that Taylor would assume the new role of Chief Basketball Strategist and Director of Scouting.

=== Texas A&M ===
On May 16, 2025, it was announced that Taylor would assume the role of Chief of Basketball Strategy and Roster Management for the Texas A&M Aggies women's basketball team.

== Personal life ==
Taylor's wife Joni is currently the head women's basketball coach at Texas A&M. The couple have two daughters, one born in 2016 and the other in 2019.

== Head coaching record ==
Legend
Regular season	G	Games coached	W	Games won	L	Games lost	W–L %	Win–loss %
Playoffs	PG	Playoff games	PW	Playoff wins	PL	Playoff losses	PW–L %	Playoff win–loss %

Team	Year	G	W	L	W–L%	Finish	PG	PW	PL	PW–L%	Result
Atlanta	2021	13	2	11	.154	5th in Eastern	—	—	—	—	Missed playoffs
