= List of 2024 WNBA season transactions =

This is a list of transactions that have taken place during the off-season and the 2024 WNBA season.

== Front office movements ==
=== Head coach changes ===
Off-season

Departure date	Team	Outgoing head coach	Reason for departure	Hire date	Incoming head coach	Last coaching position	Ref.
September 25, 2023	Chicago Sky	(Turkey) Emre Vatansever	Interim coach, contract not renewed	October 12	(United States) Teresa Weatherspoon	New Orleans Pelicans assistant coach (2019–2023)	
October 17, 2023	Phoenix Mercury	(United States) Nikki Blue	Interim coach, contract not renewed	October 18	(United States) Nate Tibbetts	Orlando Magic assistant coach (2021–2023)	

=== General manager changes / additions ===
Off-season

Departure date	Team	Outgoing general manager	Reason for departure	Hire date	Incoming general manager	Last managerial position	Ref.
January 5, 2024	Los Angeles Sparks	Karen Bryant	Stepped down	January 5, 2024	Raegan Pebley	—	
N/A	Golden State Valkyries	2025 expansion team		May 6, 2024	Ohemaa Nyanin	New York Liberty Assistant General Manager (2022–2024)	

== Player movement ==
Free agency negotiation began on January 21, 2024. Free agents were allowed to officially sign with their teams on February 1, 2024.

=== Trades ===
January
January 31	To Los Angeles Sparks: (Canada) Kia Nurse; 2024 first-round pick (Pick 4) (Rickea Jackson)	To Seattle Storm: 2026 first-round pick
January 31	To Connecticut Sun: (United States) Tiffany Mitchell; 2024 second-round pick (Pick 19) (Taiyanna Jackson)	To Minnesota Lynx: (United States) Natisha Hiedeman
February
February 1	To Atlanta Dream: (United States) Jordin Canada; 2024 first-round pick (Pick 12) (Nyadiew Puoch)	To Los Angeles Sparks: (United States) Aari McDonald; 2024 first-round pick (Pick 8)
February 3	To Connecticut Sun: (United States) Moriah Jefferson	To Phoenix Mercury: (United States) Rebecca Allen (sign-and-trade)
February 6	To Chicago Sky: (United States) Michaela Onyenwere; (United States) Brianna Turner; 2024 first-round pick (Pick 3) (Kamilla Cardoso); 2025 second-round pick (Chicago's Own; Pick 15); 2026 first-round pick; Right to swap 2026 second-round picks	To Phoenix Mercury: (United States) Kahleah Copper; (United States) Morgan Bertsch
February 19	To Chicago Sky: 2024 first-round pick (Pick 8)	To Los Angeles Sparks: (Belgium) Julie Allemand (sign-and-trade); (China) Rights to Li Yueru; 2025 third-round pick (Pick 28) (Liatu King)
March
March 14	To Chicago Sky: 2025 second-round pick (Pick 25); 2026 second-round pick	To New York Liberty: (United States) Rebekah Gardner
April
April 14	To Chicago Sky: 2024 first-round pick (Pick 7) (Angel Reese); (Serbia) Nikolina Milić	To Minnesota Lynx: 2024 first-round pick (Pick 8) (Alissa Pili); (Mali) Sika Koné; 2025 second-round pick (Pick 15) (Anastasiia Kosu); Right to swap 2026 first-round picks
May
May 4	To Dallas Wings: 2025 third-round pick (Pick 31) (Aaronette Vonleh)	To Atlanta Dream: (United States) Crystal Dangerfield
May 7	To Connecticut Sun: Queen Egbo	To Washington Mystics: (Hungary) Bernadett Határ; 2025 second-round pick (Pick 23) (Lucy Olsen)
May 11	To Seattle Storm: 2025 third-round pick (Pick 29) (Madison Conner)	To Washington Mystics: (Australia) Jade Melbourne
July
July 17	To Chicago Sky: (United States) Rachel Banham; (United States) Moriah Jefferson; 2025 first-round pick (Pick 10) (Ajša Sivka); Right to swap 2026 first-round pick	To Connecticut Sun: (United States) Marina Mabrey; 2025 second-round pick (Pick 25) (Rayah Marshall)
August
August 20	To Minnesota Lynx: (United States) Myisha Hines-Allen	To Washington Mystics: (France) Olivia Époupa; (Mali) Sika Koné; 2026 second-round pick
August 20	To Phoenix Mercury: (Sweden) Rights to Klara Lundquist	To Washington Mystics: (United States) Sug Sutton; 2025 third-round pick (Pick 32) (Zaay Green)

=== Free agency ===
Player	Date signed	New team	Former team	Ref
(United States) Lindsay Allen	February 1	Chicago Sky	Minnesota Lynx	
(United States) Rachel Banham	February 1	Connecticut Sun	Minnesota Lynx	
(United States) Kalani Brown	February 1	Dallas Wings		
(United States) Rae Burrell	February 1	Los Angeles Sparks		
(Canada) Bridget Carleton	February 1	Minnesota Lynx		
(United States) Tina Charles	February 1	Atlanta Dream	Seattle Storm	
(United States) Layshia Clarendon	February 1	Los Angeles Sparks		
(United States) Natasha Cloud	February 1	Phoenix Mercury	Washington Mystics	
(United States) Nia Coffey	February 1	Atlanta Dream		
(United States) Sydney Colson	February 1	Las Vegas Aces		
(Brazil) Damiris Dantas	February 1	Indiana Fever	Minnesota Lynx	
(Croatia) Ivana Dojkić	February 1	New York Liberty	Seattle Storm	
(United States) Skylar Diggins-Smith	February 1	Seattle Storm	Phoenix Mercury	
(United States) Emily Engstler	February 1	Washington Mystics		
(Spain) Megan Gustafson	February 1	Las Vegas Aces	Phoenix Mercury	
(United States) Morgan Jones	February 1	Las Vegas Aces		
(Japan) Stephanie Mawuli	February 1	New York Liberty		
(United States) Aerial Powers	February 1	Atlanta Dream	Minnesota Lynx	
(United States) DiDi Richards	February 1	Washington Mystics		
(Germany) Satou Sabally	February 1	Dallas Wings		
(United States) Karlie Samuelson	February 1	Washington Mystics	Los Angeles Sparks	
(United States) Katie Lou Samuelson	February 1	Indiana Fever	Los Angeles Sparks	
(Australia) Alanna Smith	February 1	Minnesota Lynx	Chicago Sky	
(United States) Kiah Stokes	February 1	Las Vegas Aces		
(Belgium) Julie Vanloo	February 1	Washington Mystics		
(United States) Courtney Williams	February 1	Minnesota Lynx	Chicago Sky	
(United States) Monique Billings	February 2	Los Angeles Sparks	Atlanta Dream	
(United States) Rennia Davis	February 2	Connecticut Sun		
(United States) Liz Dixon	February 2	Minnesota Lynx	Phoenix Mercury	
(Hungary) Virag Kiss	February 2	Los Angeles Sparks		
(United States) Taylor Mikesell	February 2	Los Angeles Sparks	Atlanta Dream	
(United States) Kianna Smith	February 2	Connecticut Sun		
(United States) Kayana Traylor	February 2	Minnesota Lynx		
(United States) Sydney Wiese	February 2	Connecticut Sun		
(Spain) Astou Ndour-Fall	February 3	Connecticut Sun	Chicago Sky	
(United States) Christyn Williams	February 3	Phoenix Mercury		
(United States) Kamaria McDaniel	February 4	Las Vegas Aces		
(United States) Diamond DeShields	February 5	Chicago Sky	Dallas Wings	
(United States) Brianna Fraser	February 5	New York Liberty		
(United States) Brionna Jones	February 5	Connecticut Sun		
(United States) Nneka Ogwumike	February 5	Seattle Storm	Los Angeles Sparks	
(United States) Taya Reimer	February 5	Chicago Sky		
(United States) DeWanna Bonner	February 6	Connecticut Sun		
(United States) Elissa Cunane	February 6	Washington Mystics	Minnesota Lynx	
(United States) Taylor Soule	February 6	Minnesota Lynx	Chicago Sky	
(United States) Candace Parker	February 7	Las Vegas Aces		
(United States) Emma Cannon	February 12	Dallas Wings	Indiana Fever	
(Bosnia and Herzegovina) Jonquel Jones	February 16	New York Liberty		
(United States) Kennedy Burke	February 20	New York Liberty		
(United States) Breanna Stewart	February 26	New York Liberty		
(United States) Stefanie Dolson	March 12	Washington Mystics	New York Liberty	
(United States) Brittney Griner	March 30	Phoenix Mercury		
(United States) Tiffany Hayes	May 31	Connecticut Sun	Las Vegas Aces	
(United States) Joyner Holmes	June 3	Seattle Storm		
(United States) Veronica Burton	June 5	Connecticut Sun	Dallas Wings	
(United States) Maya Caldwell	June 26	Atlanta Dream		
(France) Gabby Williams	August 20	Seattle Storm		

=== Hardship contracts ===
Player	Date Signed	Date Released	Team	Ref
Monique Billings	May 17, 2024	August 14, 2024	Dallas Wings	
Morgan Bertsch	June 19, 2024	June 24, 2024	Dallas Wings	
Queen Egbo	June 22, 2024	June 29, 2024	Los Angeles Sparks	
Odyssey Sims	June 25, 2024	August 14, 2024	Dallas Wings	
Jakia Brown-Turner	June 28, 2024	July 2, 2024	Washington Mystics	
Crystal Dangerfield	July 4, 2024	End of season	Los Angeles	
Jakia Brown-Turner	July 4, 2024	August 13, 2024	Washington Mystics	
Destanni Henderson	July 4, 2024	July 18, 2024	Atlanta Dream	
Liz Dixon	July 5, 2024	July 12, 2024	Phoenix Mercury	
Kiana Williams	July 5, 2024	August 18, 2024	Seattle Storm	
Jaylyn Sherrod	July 6, 2024	End of season	New York Liberty	
Celeste Taylor	July 12, 2024/ August 23, 2024	August 16, 2024/ End of Season	Phoenix Mercury	
Caitlin Bickle	July 20, 2024	End of Season	Connecticut Sun	
Celeste Taylor	August 16, 2024	August 23, 2024	Connecticut Sun	
Odyssey Sims	August 17, 2024	End of Season	Los Angeles Sparks	
Monique Billings	August 18, 2024	End of season	Phoenix Mercury	
Queen Egbo	September 2, 2024	End of Season	Las Vegas	
Amy Atwell	September 5, 2024	End of Season	Phoenix Mercury	
Ezinne Kalu	September 18, 2024	End of Season	Atlanta Dream	

=== Waived ===
Player	Date Waived	Former Team	Ref
Kadi Sissoko	March 15	Phoenix Mercury	
Victoria Vivians	March 21	Indiana Fever	
Morgan Green	April 17	New York Liberty	
Liz Dixon	April 19	Minnesota Lynx	
Ana Tadić	April 25	New York Liberty	
Desi-Rae Young	April 28	Phoenix Mercury	
Virág Kiss	April 30	Los Angeles Sparks	
Kianna Smith	May 1	Connecticut Sun	
Brea Beal	May 3	Las Vegas Aces	
Morgan Jones	May 3	Las Vegas Aces	
Emma Cannon	May 4	Dallas Wings	
Elizabeth Balogun	May 4	Atlanta Dream	
Taj Cole	May 4	Atlanta Dream	
Ashley Owusu	May 5	Dallas Wings	
Mimi Collins	May 5	Minnesota Lynx	
Jaime Nared	May 5	Minnesota Lynx	
Leigha Brown	May 5	Connecticut Sun	
Rennia Davis	May 5	Connecticut Sun	
Shey Peddy	May 5	Connecticut Sun	
Bria Hartley	May 6	Las Vegas Aces	
Taylor Mikesell	May 6	Los Angeles Sparks	
Dulcy Fankam Mendjiadeu	May 31	Seattle Storm	
Queen Egbo	June 5	Connecticut Sun	
Morgan Bertsch	June 10	Phoenix Mercury	
Emma Cannon	June 16	Las Vegas Aces	
Celeste Taylor	June 25	Indiana Fever	
Crystal Dangerfield	June 26	Atlanta Dream	
Kysre Gondrezick	June 28	Chicago Sky	
Jessika Carter	June 30	Las Vegas Aces	
Liz Dixon	July 2	Phoenix Mercury	
Kiana Williams	July 2	Seattle Storm	
Olivia Époupa	August 20	Washington Mystics	
DiDi Richards	August 20	Washington Mystics	

=== Waiver claims ===
Player	Date Claimed	New Team	Ref
Victoria Vivians	March 25	Seattle Storm	
Emma Cannon	May 6	Las Vegas Aces	
Olivia Époupa	September 19	Minnesota Lynx	

=== Contract suspensions ===
Player	Date Suspended	Date Unsuspended	Team	Reason	Ref
(Finland) Awak Kuier	January 22	-	Dallas Wings	Personal Decision	
(France) Iliana Rupert	January 24	-	Atlanta Dream	Personal Decision	
(United States) Jessica Shepard	January 31	-	Minnesota Lynx	Prioritization	
(Belgium) Julie Allemand	May 13	–	Los Angeles Sparks	Injury	
(Italy) Lorela Cubaj	May 13	May 24	Atlanta Dream		
(Hungary) Dorka Juhász	May 13	May 25	Minnesota Lynx		
(Brazil) Damiris Dantas	May 13	June 25	Indiana Fever	Injury	
(Canada) Laeticia Amihere	July 9	August 11	Atlanta Dream		
(China) Li Yueru	July 10	August 7	Los Angeles Sparks		

=== Inactive ===
Player	Date on Inactive	Date Returned	Team	Reason	Ref

=== Contract extensions ===
Player	Date	Team	Ref
(Bosnia and Herzegovina) Jonquel Jones	January 31	New York Liberty	
(United States) Lexie Brown	February 6	Los Angeles Sparks	
(United States) Chelsea Gray	April 30	Las Vegas Aces	
(United States) Jackie Young	May 3	Las Vegas Aces	
(Australia) Ezi Magbegor	June 4	Seattle Storm	
(United States) Dearica Hamby	June 13	Los Angeles Sparks	
(United States) Azurá Stevens	August 22	Los Angeles Sparks	
(Australia) Stephanie Talbot	August 22	Los Angeles Sparks	
(United States) Sophie Cunningham	September 14	Phoenix Mercury	
(United States) Elizabeth Williams	September 19	Chicago Sky	

=== Training camp cuts ===
All players listed did not make the final roster.

Atlanta Dream	Chicago Sky	Connecticut Sun	Dallas Wings
Elizabeth Balogun; Taj Cole; Khaalia Hillsman; Khadijiah Cave; Destanni Henderson	Taya Reimer	Kianna Smith; Shey Peddy; Rennia Davis; Leigha Brown; Helena Pueyo; Taiyanna Jackson	Emma Cannon; Ashley Owusu; Katrina Pardee
Indiana Fever	Las Vegas Aces	Los Angeles Sparks	Minnesota Lynx
Leilani Correa; Maya Caldwell	Morgan Jones; Brea Beal; Bria Hartley; Kamaria McDaniels; Angel Jackson	Virág Kiss; Taylor Mikesell	Mimi Collins; Jaime Nared; Ruthy Hebard; Kiki Jefferson; Quinesha Lockett
New York Liberty	Phoenix Mercury	Seattle Storm	Washington Mystics
Stephanie Mawuli; Rita Igbokwe; Brianna Fraser; Jessika Carter; Okako Adika		Alaina Coates; Quay Miller; Kaela Davis	Honesty Scott-Grayson

== Draft ==
*	Denotes player who has been selected for at least one All-Star Game and All-WNBA Team
^{+}	Denotes player who has been selected for at least one All-Star Game
^{#}	Denotes player who never played in the WNBA regular season or playoffs
**Bold**	Denotes player who won Rookie of the Year

=== First Round ===
Pick	Player	Nationality	Team	School / club team
1	**Caitlin Clark^{*}**	United States	Indiana Fever	Iowa
2	Cameron Brink	United States	Los Angeles Sparks	Stanford
3	Kamilla Cardoso	Brazil	Chicago Sky (from Phoenix) (Note: February 6, 2024: Phoenix to Chicago: Phoenix acquired Kahleah Copper and Morgan Bertsch; Chicago acquired Brianna Turner, Michaela Onyenwere, a 2024 first-round pick (3rd overall), Chicago's own 2025 second-round pick, a 2026 first-round pick, and the right to swap 2026 second-round picks with Phoenix)	South Carolina
4	Rickea Jackson	United States	Los Angeles Sparks (from Seattle) (Note: January 31, 2024: Seattle to Los Angeles: Los Angeles acquired Kia Nurse and a 2024 first-round pick (4th overall); Seattle acquired a 2026 first-round-pick)	Tennessee
5	Jacy Sheldon	United States	Dallas Wings (from Chicago) (Note: February 11, 2023: Four-team trade among Chicago, Dallas, New York, and Phoenix: Chicago acquired Marina Mabrey and a 2024 second-round pick (from Phoenix); New York acquired rights to Leonie Fiebich, a 2024 second-round pick (from Chicago), and the right to swap 2025 first-round picks (from Phoenix); Phoenix acquired Michaela Onyenwere, 2024 third-round pick (from Chicago), and 2025 second-round pick (from Chicago); Dallas acquired Diamond DeShields, 2023 and 2024 first-round picks (from Chicago), and the right to swap 2025 first-round picks (from Chicago))	Ohio State
6	Aaliyah Edwards	Canada	Washington Mystics	UConn
7	Angel Reese^{+}	United States	Chicago Sky (from Minnesota) (Note: April 14, 2024: Chicago to Minnesota: Chicago acquired a 2024 first round pick (7th overall), and Nikolina Milić; Minnesota acquired a 2024 first round pick (8th overall), Sika Koné, a 2025 second-round pick, and right to swap 2026 first-round picks with Chicago.)	LSU
8	Alissa Pili	United States	Minnesota Lynx (from Chicago via Atlanta via Los Angeles) (Note: February 19, 2024: Los Angeles to Chicago: Los Angeles acquired Julie Allemand, the rights to Li Yueru and a 2025 third-round pick; Chicago acquired a 2024 first round pick (8th overall)) (Note: February 1, 2024: Atlanta to Los Angeles: Atlanta acquired Jordin Canada and Las Vegas' 2024 first-round pick (12th overall); Los Angeles acquired Aari McDonald and a 2024 first-round pick (8th overall))	Utah
9	Carla Leite	France	Dallas Wings	Tarbes (France)
10	Leïla Lacan	France	Connecticut Sun	Angers (France)
11	Marquesha Davis	United States	New York Liberty	Ole Miss
12	Nyadiew Puoch	Australia	Atlanta Dream (from Las Vegas via Los Angeles) (Note: January 21, 2023: Las Vegas to Los Angeles: Las Vegas acquired Amanda Zahui B and a 2024 second-round pick; Los Angeles acquired Dearica Hamby and a 2024 first round pick)	Southside Flyers (Australia)

=== Second Round ===
Pick	Player	Nationality	Team	School / club team
13	Brynna Maxwell^{#}	United States	Chicago Sky (from Phoenix)	Gonzaga
14	Nika Mühl	Croatia	Seattle Storm	UConn
15	Celeste Taylor	United States	Indiana Fever	Ohio State
16	Dyaisha Fair	United States	Las Vegas Aces (from Los Angeles)	Syracuse
17	Esmery Martínez^{#}	Dominican Republic	New York Liberty (from Chicago)	Arizona
18	Kate Martin	United States	Las Vegas Aces (from Washington) (Note: February 5, 2023: Las Vegas to Washington: Las Vegas acquired 2024 and 2025 second-round picks; Washington acquired the rights to Amanda Zahui B)	Iowa
19	Taiyanna Jackson^{#}	United States	Connecticut Sun (from Minnesota) (Note: January 31, 2024: Connecticut to Minnesota: Connecticut acquired Tiffany Mitchell and a 2024 second-round pick (19th overall); Minnesota acquired Natisha Hiedeman)	Kansas
20	Isobel Borlase	Australia	Atlanta Dream	Adelaide Lightning (Australia)
21	Kaylynne Truong^{#}	United States Vietnam	Washington Mystics (from Dallas) (Note: April 10, 2023: Washington to Dallas: Dallas acquired the rights to Stephanie Soares; Washington acquired 2024 second-round and 2025 first-round picks (via Atlanta))	Gonzaga
22	Helena Pueyo^{#}	Spain	Connecticut Sun	Arizona
23	Jessika Carter	United States	New York Liberty	Mississippi State
24	Elizabeth Kitley	United States	Las Vegas Aces	Virginia Tech

=== Third Round ===
Pick	Player	Nationality	Team	School / club team
25	Charisma Osborne	United States	Phoenix Mercury	UCLA
26	Mackenzie Holmes	United States	Seattle Storm	Indiana
27	Leilani Correa^{#}	United States	Indiana Fever	Florida
28	McKenzie Forbes^{#}	United States	Los Angeles Sparks	USC
29	Jaz Shelley^{#}	Australia	Phoenix Mercury (from Chicago)	Nebraska
30	Nastja Claessens^{#}	Belgium	Washington Mystics	Castors Braine (Belgium)
31	Kiki Jefferson^{#}	United States	Minnesota Lynx	Louisville
32	Matilde Villa^{#}	Italy	Atlanta Dream	Reyer Venezia (Italy)
33	Ashley Owusu^{#}	United States	Dallas Wings	Penn State
34	Abbey Hsu^{#}	United States	Connecticut Sun	Columbia
35	Kaitlyn Davis^{#}	United States	New York Liberty	USC
36	Angel Jackson^{#}	United States	Las Vegas Aces	Jackson State

=== Previous years' draftees ===
Draft	Pick	Player	Date signed	Team	Previous team	Ref
2020	22	Leonie Fiebich	February 1	New York Liberty		
2023	30	Okako Adika	February 1	New York Liberty		
2023	4	Stephanie Soares	February 6	Dallas Wings		
