= Mikiah Herbert Harrigan =

British basketball player (born 1998)

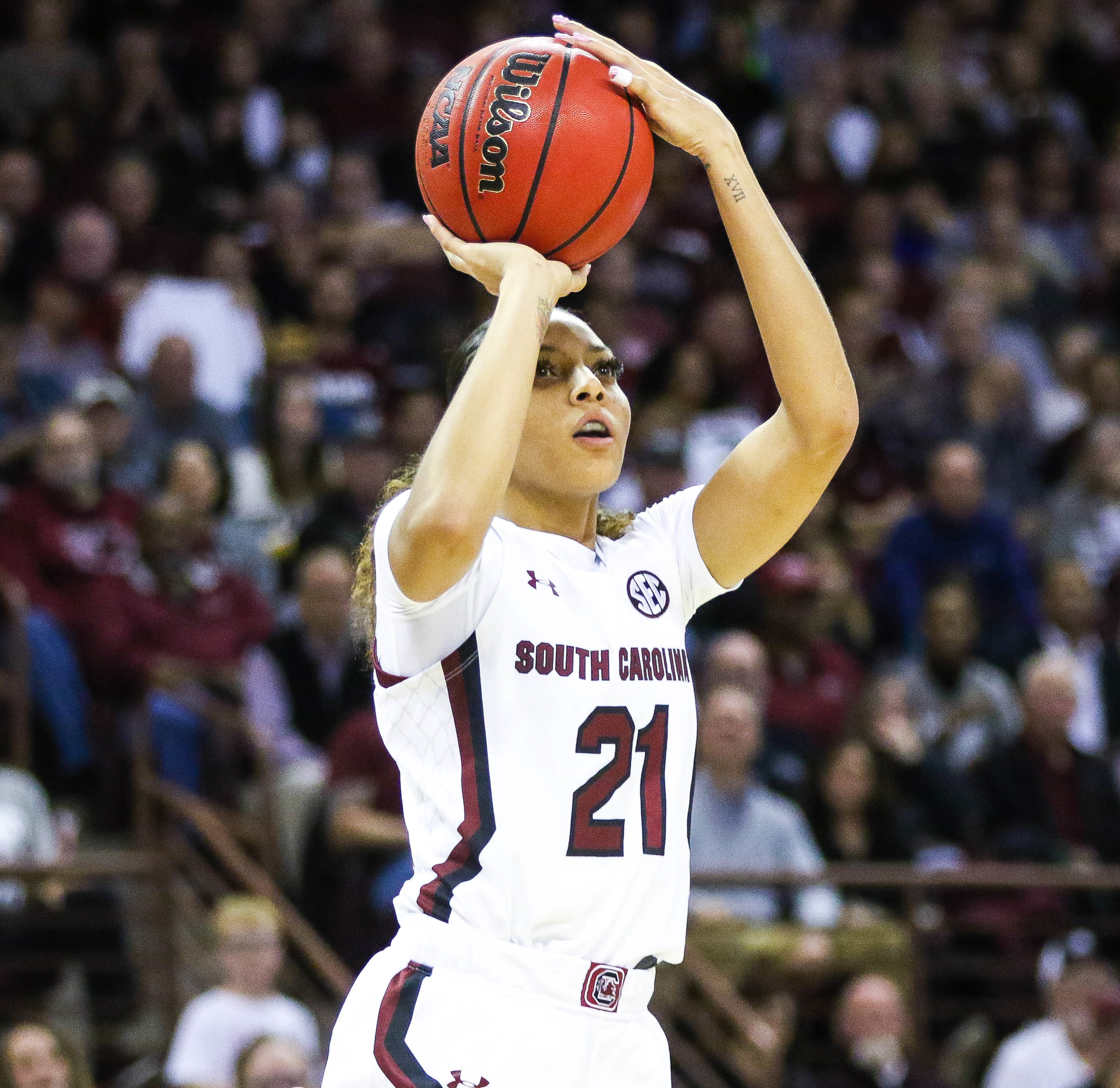

Free agent
- Position: Forward

Personal information
- Born: 21 August 1998 (age 28) Island Harbour, Anguilla
- Listed height: 6 ft 2 in (1.88 m)
- Listed weight: 152 lb (69 kg)

Career information
- High school: Flanagan (Pembroke Pines, Florida)
- College: South Carolina (2016–2020)
- WNBA draft: 2020: 1st round, 6th overall pick
- Drafted by: Minnesota Lynx
- Playing career: 2020–present

Career history
- 2020: Minnesota Lynx
- 2020–2021: Kayseri Basketbol
- 2021: Seattle Storm
- 2022–2023: London Lions
- 2023–2024: Galatasaray
- 2024: Phoenix Mercury
- 2024: CB Avenida
- 2025: Maccabi Ramat Gan
- 2025–: Elitzur Ramla

Career highlights
- NCAA champion (2017); Second-team All-SEC (2020); SEC tournament MVP (2020)
- Stats at Basketball Reference

Mikiah "Kiki" Herbert Harrigan (born 21 August 1998) is a British professional basketball player who plays for Elitzur Ramla of the Israeli Women's Basketball Premier League. She played college basketball for the South Carolina Gamecocks and was selected sixth overall by the Minnesota Lynx in the 2020 WNBA draft.

== College career ==
Herbert Harrigan finished her career second in blocked shots in the Gamecocks' program history. She joined Alaina Coates and A'ja Wilson as the only Gamecocks to amass over 1,000 points and 200 blocks in their careers. She averaged 13.1 points and 5.6 rebounds per game as a senior, while shooting 50.6% overall and 43.5% on three-pointers. Herbert Harrigan earned the nickname “Mad Kiki’’ for her effort on defense.

== Professional career ==
=== WNBA ===
==== Minnesota Lynx (2020) ====
Herbert Harrigan was selected 6th overall in the 2020 WNBA draft by the Minnesota Lynx. She finished her rookie season playing in 21 games averaging 3.8 points per game and shooting 42.2% from 3.

==== Seattle Storm (2021) ====
On 10 February 2021, Herbert Harrigan was traded from the Lynx to the Seattle Storm for a 2022 first-round pick. She played just one game for the Storm on May 18, 2021, logging over a minute with no stats in an 80–96 loss to the Las Vegas Aces, before missing the rest of the season due to pregnancy and taking paid maternity leave.

On 4 May 2022 (two days before the season was set to start), Herbert Harrigan was waived by the Storm and did not play for any team during the 2022 season. She was signed to the Connecticut Sun's training camp roster on 4 February 2023, but was waived on 3 May before the season started.

==== Phoenix Mercury (2024) ====
On 8 February 2024, Herbert Harrigan signed with the Phoenix Mercury and made the final roster.

On 2 February 2025, Herbert Harrigan was part of a four-team trade that sent her reserved rights to the Dallas Wings. On 18 February 2025, she signed a training camp contract. On 3 May 2025, she was waived by the Wings.

=== Overseas ===
==== Kayseri Basketbol (2020–2021) ====
On 20 June 2020, Herbert Harrigan signed with Kayseri Basketbol of the Turkish Women's Basketball Super League (TKBL).

==== London Lions (2022–2023) ====
Herbert Harrigan played for the London Lions of the Women's British Basketball League in the 2022–2023 season.

==== Galatasaray (2023–2024) ====
On 23 July 2023, Herbert Harrigan signed with Galatasaray of TKBL.

==== CB Avenida (2024) ====
Harrigan signed with CB Avenida of the Liga Femenina de Baloncesto for the 2024–2025 season, however, she parted ways with the team at the end of 2024.

==== Maccabi Ramat Gan (2025) ====
In January 2025, Harrigan signed with Maccabi Ramat Gan of the Israeli Premier League.

==== Elitzur Ramla (2025) ====
In June 2025, Harrigan signed with Elitzur Ramla of the Israeli Premier League.

On February 28, 2026, Harrigan's former head coach during her time with the Gamecocks, Dawn Staley, announced that the college was working towards repatriating Harrigan from Israel as a result of the 2026 Iran War.

== Career statistics ==
Legend
GP	Games played	GS	Games started	MPG	Minutes per game	RPG	Rebounds per game
APG	Assists per game	SPG	Steals per game	BPG	Blocks per game	PPG	Points per game
TO	Turnovers per game	FG%	Field-goal percentage	3P%	3-point field-goal percentage	FT%	Free-throw percentage
**Bold**	Career best	°	League leader

*	Denotes season(s) in which Herbert Harrigan won an NCAA Championship

=== WNBA ===
==== Regular season ====
WNBA regular season statistics
Year	Team	GP	GS	MPG	FG%	3P%	FT%	RPG	APG	SPG	BPG	TO	PPG
2020	Minnesota	21	0	**11.1**	.366	**.424**	**.714**	**2.3**	**0.3**	0.4	**0.4**	0.7	**3.8**
2021	Seattle	1	0	1.0	.000	.000	.000	0.0	0.0	0.0	0.0	**0.0**	0.0
2022	Did not play (waived)												
2023	Did not play (waived)												
2024	Phoenix	**31**	**3**	10.8	**.412**	.327	.550	1.5	**0.3**	**0.5**	**0.4**	0.5	3.2
**Career**	3 years, 3 teams	53	3	10.8	.389	.365	.550	1.8	0.3	0.5	0.4	0.6	3.3

==== Playoffs ====
WNBA playoff statistics
Year	Team	GP	GS	MPG	FG%	3P%	FT%	RPG	APG	SPG	BPG	TO	PPG
2020	Minnesota	**3**	0	**9.7**	**.600**	**.500**	**.500**	**1.7**	0.0	0.0	**0.3**	1.0	**3.0**
2024	Phoenix	2	0	1.5	—	—	—	0.0	0.0	0.0	0.0	**0.0**	0.0
**Career**	2 years, 2 teams	5	0	6.4	.600	.500	.500	1.0	0.0	0.0	0.2	0.6	1.8

=== College ===
NCAA statistics
Year	Team	GP	GS	MPG	FG%	3P%	FT%	RPG	APG	SPG	BPG	TO	PPG
2016–17*	South Carolina	**37**	3	16.5	.467	.250	.698	3.3	0.5	0.4	1.1	1.2	4.9
2017–18	South Carolina	33	5	16.9	.489	.182	.768	3.7	0.6	0.4	1.3	1.2	7.1
2018–19	South Carolina	33	21	22.7	.463	.423	.821	5.1	0.5	0.6	**2.2**	1.3	10.4
2019–20	South Carolina	33	**33**	**26.1**	**.506**	**.435**	**.835**	**5.6**	**1.4**	**0.7**	1.8	1.4	**13.1**
**Career**		136	62	20.4	.484	.391	.791	4.4	0.7	0.5	1.5	1.3	8.8
