= Celeste Taylor =

American basketball player (born 2001)

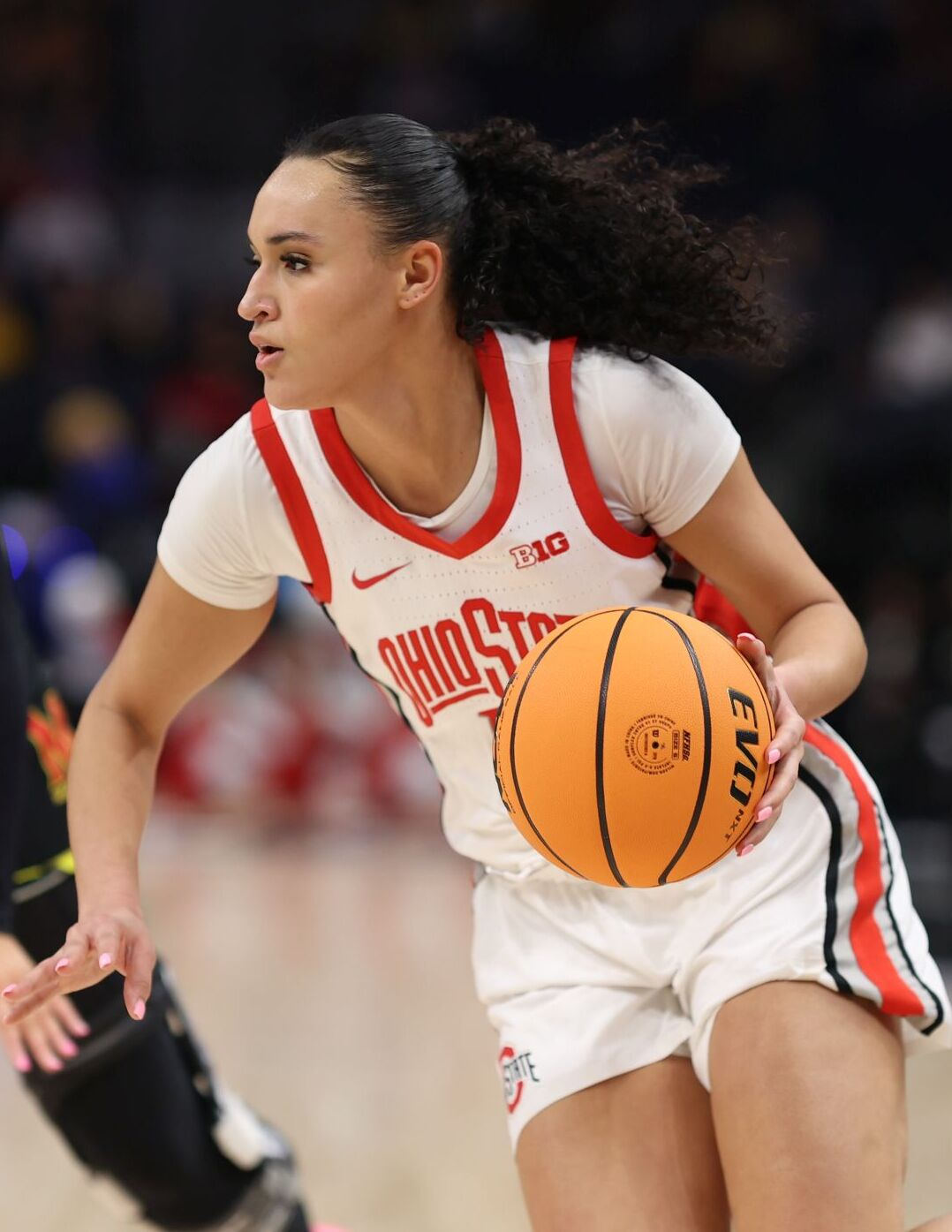
- Taylor with Ohio State in 2024

Personal information
- Born: June 20, 2001 (age 25) Queens, New York, U.S.
- Listed height: 5 ft 11 in (1.80 m)
- Listed weight: 167 lb (76 kg)

Career information
- High school: Valley Stream South (Valley Stream, New York); Long Island Lutheran (Brookville, New York)
- College: Texas (2019–2021); Duke (2021–2023); Ohio State (2023–2024)
- WNBA draft: 2024: 2nd round, 15th overall pick
- Drafted by: Indiana Fever
- Playing career: 2024–present

Career history
- 2024: Indiana Fever
- 2024: Phoenix Mercury
- 2024: Connecticut Sun
- 2024–2025: Sydney Flames

Career highlights
- First-team All-ACC (2023); Second-team All-Big Ten (2024); Big Ten Defensive Player of the Year – Coaches (2024); ACC Defensive Player of the Year (2023); ACC All-Defensive Team (2023); Big Ten All-Defensive Team (2024); Big 12 All-Freshman Team (2020); McDonald's All-American (2019)
- Stats at Basketball Reference
Medals
Women's basketball
Representing the United States
FIBA Under-19 World Cup
Gold medal – first place	2019 Thailand	Team
FIBA Under-17 World Cup
Gold medal – first place	2018 Belarus	Team
FIBA Americas Under-16 Championship
Gold medal – first place	2017 Argentina	Team

Celeste Yvonne Taylor (born June 20, 2001) is an American professional basketball player who is currently a free agent. She previously played for the Phoenix Mercury of the Women's National Basketball Association (WNBA). She played college basketball at Texas, Duke, and Ohio State.

== Early life ==
Taylor is from Queens, New York and is the granddaughter of Colombian immigrants. She grew up living with her maternal grandparents in a three-bedroom apartment in Astoria, Queens, where a total of nine people lived. Taylor became fluent in Spanish and visited Colombia once as a child. Her athleticism was already noticed in elementary school, and in addition to basketball, she was a talented softball player.

== High school career ==
Taylor played varsity basketball for Valley Stream South High School in Valley Stream, New York in seventh grade. One year later, she transferred Long Island Lutheran Middle and High School in Brookville, New York, where she became a starter as a freshman. As a senior, Taylor was named New York Gatorade Player of the Year. She was selected to play in the McDonald's All-American Game and Jordan Brand Classic. Taylor was named Newsday Long Island Player of the Year in her final two years. Rated a five-star recruit by ESPN, she committed to playing college basketball for Texas over offers from Stanford, Notre Dame, Ohio State and South Carolina, among other programs.

== College career ==
As a freshman at Texas, Taylor averaged 9.3 points and 4.8 rebounds per game, leading the team with 31 three-pointers. She was named to the Big 12 All-Freshman Team. She averaged 12.3 points, 4.9 rebounds and 2.1 steals per game as a sophomore, earning All-Big 12 honorable mention. For her junior season, Taylor transferred to Duke and averaged 11 points, 5.5 rebounds and 2.1 assists per game. In her senior season, Taylor was named Atlantic Coast Conference (ACC) Defensive Player of the Year and first-team All-ACC, while averaging 11.4 points, 4.8 rebounds, 2.5 assists and 2.2 steals per game. She set a program single-game record with 10 steals in a second-round loss to Colorado at the 2023 NCAA tournament. Taylor transferred to Ohio State for her fifth season.

== Professional career ==
=== WNBA ===
==== Indiana Fever (2024) ====
On April 15, 2024, Taylor was selected in the second round as the fifteenth overall pick of the 2024 WNBA draft by the Indiana Fever. She made the roster and played in five games for the Fever before being waived on June 25, 2024.

==== Phoenix Mercury (2024) ====
On July 12, 2024, Taylor signed a seven-day contract with the Phoenix Mercury.

==== Connecticut Sun (2024) ====
On August 16, 2024, Taylor signed a seven-day contract with the Connecticut Sun.

==== Second stint with Phoenix (2024) ====
After two games with Connecticut, Taylor signed a second seven-day contract with the Mercury on August 23, 2024. A week later, she signed a third seven-day contract and eventually secured a rest-of-season contract with the team. During her two stints with Phoenix, Taylor was a valuable part of the rotation, playing in 15 regular-season games, starting 4 of them, and averaging 20 minutes per game. On January 22, 2025, the Mercury and Celeste Taylor agreed to a one-year, non-guaranteed training camp contract deal. She was cut after training camp, and did not make the opening day roster.

=== WNBL ===
Taylor signed with the Sydney Flames for the 2024–25 WNBL season.

== National team career ==
Taylor won a gold medal with the United States national under-16 team at the 2017 FIBA Under-16 Women's Americas Championship in Argentina. She started in all five games and averaged 4.8 points and 3.8 rebounds per game. Taylor played at the 2018 FIBA Under-17 Women's Basketball World Cup in Belarus, averaging 6.1 points and 4.1 rebounds per game en route to a gold medal. She won a third gold medal with the national under-19 team at the 2019 FIBA Under-19 Women's Basketball World Cup in Thailand, where she averaged five points and 2.6 rebounds per game.

== Career statistics ==
Legend
GP	Games played	GS	Games started	MPG	Minutes per game	FG%	Field goal percentage	3P%	3-point field goal percentage
FT%	Free throw percentage	RPG	Rebounds per game	APG	Assists per game	SPG	Steals per game	BPG	Blocks per game
TO	Turnovers per game	PPG	Points per game	**Bold**	Career high	°	League leader

=== WNBA ===
==== Regular season ====
Stats current through end of 2024 season

Celeste Taylor WNBA statistics
Year	Team	GP	GS	MPG	FG%	3P%	FT%	RPG	APG	SPG	BPG	TO	PPG
2024	Indiana	5	0	3.2	**1.000**	–	.500	0.2	0.2	—	0.2	**0.2**	0.6
2024	Connecticut	2	0	5.4	**1.000**	–	–	–	–	–	–	–	1.0
2024	Phoenix	**15**	**4**	**20.0**	.317	**.200**	**.563**	**1.8**	**1.8**	**1.0**	**0.6**	1.4	**3.5**
**Career**	1 year, 3 teams	22	4	14.9	.339	.200	.556	1.3	1.3	0.7	0.5	1.0	2.6

==== Playoffs ====
Celeste Taylor WNBA Playoff Statistics
Year	Team	GP	GS	MPG	FG%	3P%	FT%	RPG	APG	SPG	BPG	TO	PPG
2024	Phoenix	2	0	14.0	.667	.500	—	1.0	2.5	0.0	0.5	0.0	2.5
**Career**	1 year, 1 team	2	0	14.0	.667	.500	—	1.0	2.5	0.0	0.5	0.0	2.5

=== College ===
Celeste Taylor NCAA statistics
Year	Team	GP	GS	MPG	FG%	3P%	FT%	RPG	APG	SPG	BPG	TO	PPG
2019–20	Texas	30	26	27.9	34.0	28.4	**70.8**	4.8	1.5	1.4	0.7	2.8	9.3
2020–21	Texas	28	26	**32.0**	35.3	29.7	58.9	4.9	2.0	2.1	0.6	2.5	**12.3**
2021–22	Duke	23	22	28.5	38.8	**33.3**	69.0	**5.5**	2.1	1.8	0.5	2.8	11.0
2022–23	Duke	**33**	**33**	28.9	39.4	32.1	67.5	4.8	2.5	2.2	0.6	**2.2**	11.4
2023–24	Ohio State	32	32	28.7	**40.9**	32.0	64.3	4.1	**3.4**	**2.5**	**0.9**	2.4	10.1
**Career**		146	139	29.2	37.6	31.1	66.3	4.8	2.3	2.0	0.7	2.5	10.8

== Personal life ==
Taylor graduated from college with a degree in child psychology and became the first person in her immediate family to graduate from college.
