= Nate Tibbetts =

American basketball coach (born 1977)

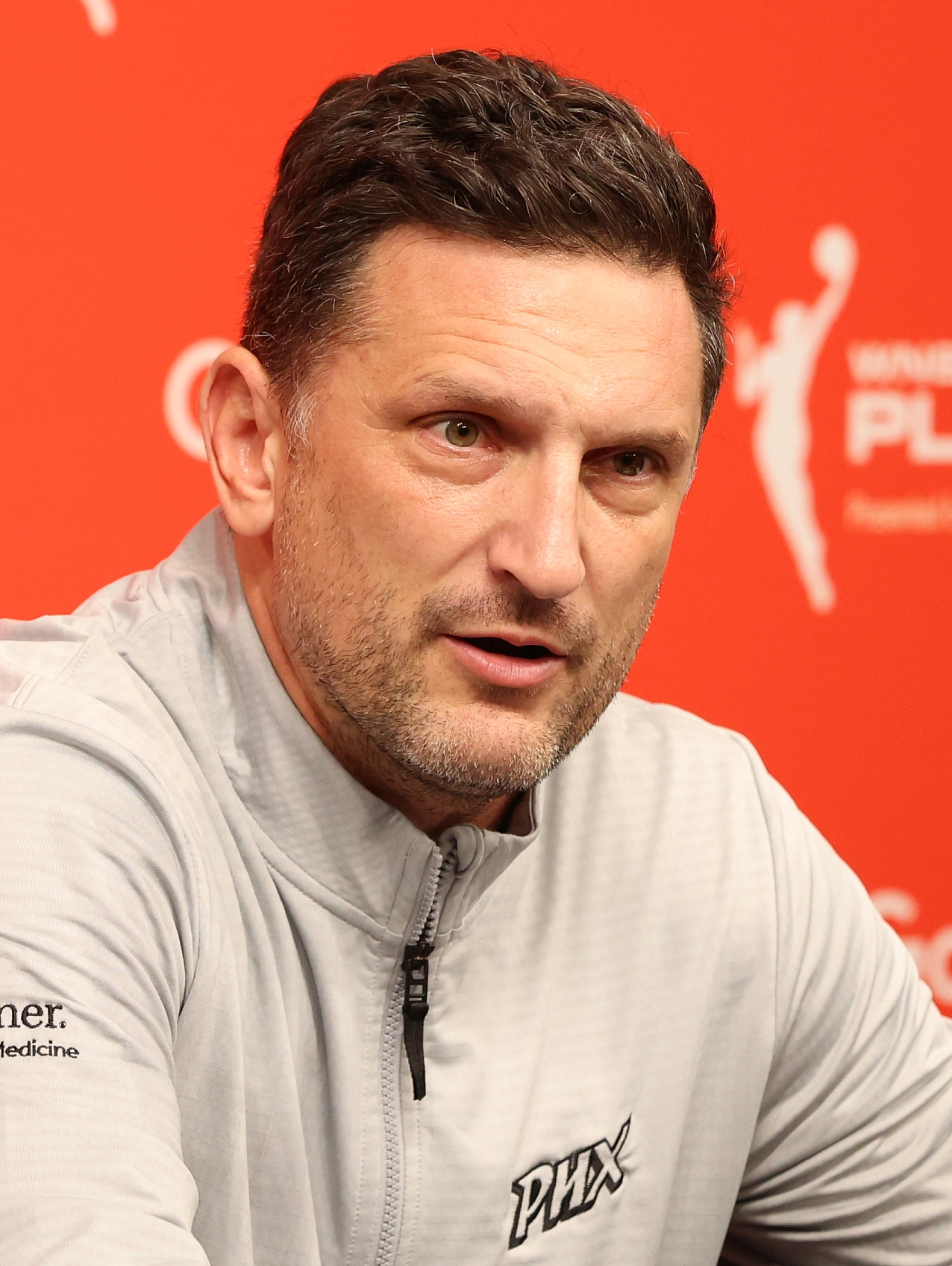
- Tibbetts in 2025

Phoenix Mercury
- Position: Head coach
- League: WNBA

Personal information
- Born: May 15, 1977 (age 49) Sioux Falls, South Dakota, U.S.
- Listed height: 6 ft 1 in (1.85 m)
- Listed weight: 180 lb (82 kg)

Career information
- High school: Jefferson (Jefferson, South Dakota); Roosevelt (Sioux Falls, South Dakota)
- College: South Dakota (1996–2001)
- Coaching career: 2001–present

Career history

Coaching
- 2001–2005: Sioux Falls (assistant)
- 2005–2007: Sioux Falls Skyforce (assistant)
- 2007–2009: Sioux Falls Skyforce
- 2009–2011: Tulsa 66ers
- 2011–2013: Cleveland Cavaliers (assistant)
- 2013–2021: Portland Trail Blazers (assistant)
- 2021–2023: Orlando Magic (assistant)
- 2024–present: Phoenix Mercury

Nathan M. Tibbetts (born May 15, 1977) is an American basketball coach who is the incumbent head coach of the Phoenix Mercury of the Women's National Basketball Association (WNBA).

== Early life ==
Tibbetts is the son of girls high school basketball coach Fred Tibbetts. He grew up in Jefferson, South Dakota, and attended high school there before transferring to Roosevelt High School in Sioux Falls as a junior. A 6 feet 1 inch (1.85 m), 180 pounds (82 kg) point guard, he led the basketball team at Roosevelt to a third-place finish in the state tournament as a senior, when he averaged 11 points and 2.5 rebounds per game and was chosen all-conference and all-state. He appeared in a total of 46 games at Roosevelt and set the school's all-time assists record, with 366.

Tibbetts enrolled at the University of South Dakota and began playing for the South Dakota Coyotes men's basketball team. He redshirted his first year and then started the final nine games of his redshirt-freshman season. He won the starting job as a sophomore and remained a starter for the rest of his tenure there. The team went 19–8 in the 1997–98 season and Tibbetts helped them win 22 or more games in each of the next three years, which included winning the North Central Conference (NCC) title three seasons in a row. He was an All-NCC selection and All-NCC Tournament choice in his senior year and ended his collegiate career with averages of 5.1 points and 2.9 rebounds per game; he also averaged 6.5 assists in conference play and placed second in school history in career assists (678) and steals (215). He was named the Argus-Leader Player of the Year as a senior and was inducted into the South Dakota Coyotes Hall of Fame in 2014. Nate was also Vice President of the Jack Club, at the University of South Dakota.

== Coaching career ==
Tibbetts began his coaching career after he graduated from the University of South Dakota in 2001, becoming an assistant for the Sioux Falls Cougars of the National Association of Intercollegiate Athletics (NAIA). He spent four seasons in that role and helped them win 20 or more games each year, including 26 in 2003–04. He then became an assistant coach for the Sioux Falls Skyforce, of the NBA D-League, starting with the 2005–06 season. Following two seasons, in which the team went 32–19 and 29–19, Tibbetts was promoted to head coach in 2007. He served two seasons in that position and compiled a record of 53–47 with a playoff appearance.

In 2009, Tibbetts left the Skyforce for the head job with the Tulsa 66ers. He served two seasons there and went 64–41 while reaching the playoffs both years. In 2011, he also served as the head coach of Team USA at the Pan American Games. He joined the Cleveland Cavaliers of the National Basketball Association (NBA) in the 2011–12 season as assistant coach. He left to become an assistant with the Portland Trail Blazers in 2013. He served with the Trail Blazers from 2013 to 2021, which including being the associate head coach from 2019 to 2021. During his stint at Portland, he was interviewed several times for vacant head coaching positions, including with the Memphis Grizzlies, Atlanta Hawks and Cleveland Cavaliers. He became an assistant with the Orlando Magic in 2021.

In October 2023, Tibbetts was announced as the new head coach of the Phoenix Mercury of the Women's National Basketball Association (WNBA), becoming the highest-paid coach in WNBA history.

== Head coaching record ==
=== NBA D-League ===
Team	Year	G	W	L	W–L%	Finish	PG	PW	PL	PW–L%	Result
Sioux Falls	2007–08	50	28	22	.560	2nd in Central	2	1	1	.500	Lost in Semifinals
Sioux Falls	2008–09	50	25	25	.500	4th in Central	—	—	—	—	Missed playoffs
Tulsa	2009–10	50	27	23	.540	5th in Western	3	2	1	.667	Lost D-League Finals
Tulsa	2010–11	50	33	17	.660	3rd in Western	2	1	1	.500	Missed playoffs
Career		200	113	87	.565		7	4	3	.571	

=== WNBA ===
Legend
Regular season	G	Games coached	W	Games won	L	Games lost	W–L %	Win–loss %
Playoffs	PG	Playoff games	PW	Playoff wins	PL	Playoff losses	PW–L %	Playoff win–loss %

Team	Year	G	W	L	W–L%	Finish	PG	PW	PL	PW–L%	Result
Phoenix	2024	40	19	21	.475	4th in West	2	0	2	.000	Lost in First Round
Phoenix	2025	44	27	17	.614	3rd in West	11	5	6	.455	Lost in WNBA Finals
Phoenix	2026	20	7	13	.350		0	0	0	–	
Career		104	53	51	.510		13	5	8	.385	
