= Natasha Mack =

American basketball player (born 1997)

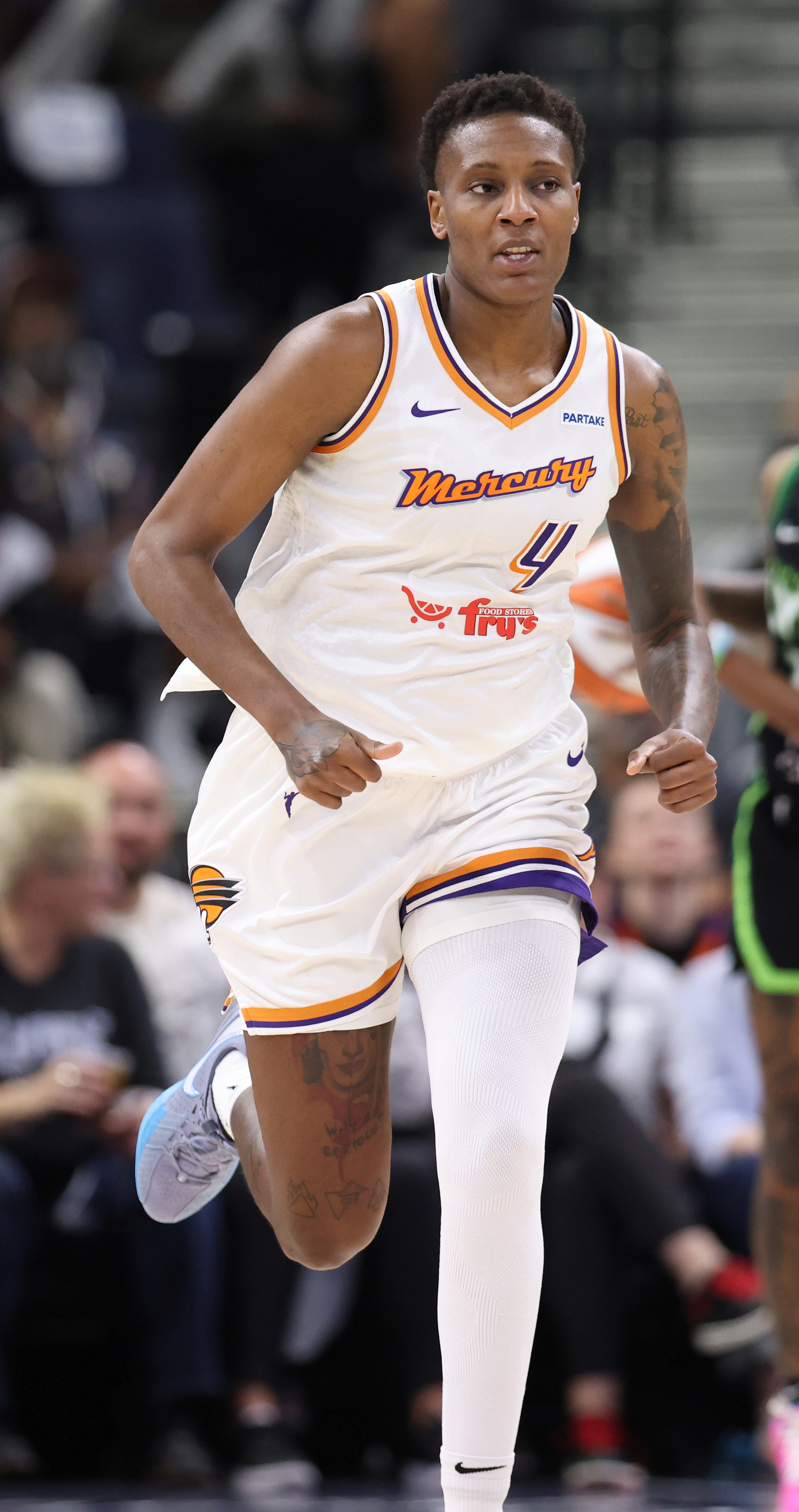
- Mack with the Phoenix Mercury in 2024

No. 4 – Phoenix Mercury
- Position: Forward/Center
- League: WNBA

Personal information
- Born: November 3, 1997 (age 29) Lufkin, Texas, U.S.
- Listed height: 6 ft 3 in (1.91 m)
- Listed weight: 182 lb (83 kg)

Career information
- High school: Lufkin (Lufkin, Texas)
- College: Angelina College (2017–2019); Oklahoma State (2019–2021)
- WNBA draft: 2021: 2nd round, 16th overall pick
- Drafted by: Chicago Sky
- Playing career: 2021–present

Career history
- 2021: Chicago Sky
- 2021: Minnesota Lynx
- 2021–2023: AZS UMCS Lublin
- 2023: Mainland Pouākai
- 2023–2024: Botaş SK
- 2024–present: Phoenix Mercury
- 2025: Uni Girona CB

Career highlights
- WBCA Defensive Player of the Year (2021); Naismith Defensive Player of the Year (2021); Third-team All-American – AP, USBWA (2021); Big 12 Defensive Player of the Year (2021); First Team All-Big 12 (2021); 2× All-Big 12 Defensive Team (2020, 2021); Big 12 Newcomer of the Year (2020)
- Stats at Basketball Reference

Natasha Mack (born November 3, 1997) is an American-Montenegrin basketball player for the Phoenix Mercury of the Women's National Basketball Association (WNBA). She played for Oklahoma State University and Angelina College in her native Lufkin, Texas before being drafted by the Chicago Sky in the 2021 WNBA draft.

== Early life ==
Mack was born in Lufkin, Texas. She played for Lufkin High School's basketball team. She was ranked as a four-star prospect after high school and was recruited to play at the University of Houston. However, she left the university shortly afterwards, after feeling burnout, a lack of fit with the team, and tensions at home. She returned to Lufkin and worked at a poultry plant, "shearing the wings off of chicken."

== College career ==
A year after graduating from high school and leaving Houston, Mack was recruited by Randy McKelvey, an assistant basketball coach at Angelina College, a local community college in Lufkin. She was initially reluctant to return to basketball, but agreed to do so a few days later. She was selected to a junior-college all-star event after her first season and was named a junior-college All-American and won the NJCAA Player of the Year Award after her sophomore season.

After her senior season, she was selected to the Big-12 All-Defensive Team First-Team and was named Big 12 Defensive Player of the Year and WBCA Defensive Player of the Year.

== Professional career ==
=== Chicago Sky (2021) ===
Mack was drafted in the second round of the 2021 WNBA draft by the Chicago Sky. She was waived by the Sky on May 13, 2021, but was re-signed by the team shortly afterwards on May 18. Mack went back and forth with signing Hardship Contracts with the Sky until ultimately being let go for the last time in June 2021.

=== Minnesota Lynx (2021) ===
Mack signed a 7-day contract with the Lynx on July 6, 2021.

=== Phoenix Mercury (2024) ===
After two years playing overseas in Poland, New Zealand and Turkey, Mack signed with the Phoenix Mercury for the 2024 WNBA season. On May 14, 2024, she earned her first WNBA career start in Mercury's opening loss at the Las Vegas Aces.

== Career statistics ==
Legend
GP	Games played	GS	Games started	MPG	Minutes per game	FG%	Field goal percentage
3P%	3-point field goal percentage	FT%	Free throw percentage	RPG	Rebounds per game	APG	Assists per game
SPG	Steals per game	BPG	Blocks per game	TO	Turnovers per game	PPG	Points per game
**Bold**	Career high		Led Division I	°	Led the league

=== WNBA ===
==== Regular season ====
Stats current through end of 2025 season

WNBA regular season statistics
Year	Team	GP	GS	MPG	FG%	3P%	FT%	RPG	APG	SPG	BPG	TO	PPG
2021	Chicago	3	0	5.3	**.667**	—	**1.000**	1.3	0.0	0.0	0.0	0.7	2.0
2021	Minnesota	1	0	2.0	—	—	—	0.0	0.0	0.0	0.0	**0.0**	0.0
2022	Did not play (waived)												
2023	Did not appear in league												
2024	Phoenix	**40**	11	15.5	.573	.000	.579	5.0	**1.1**	0.7	1.2	0.7	3.8
2025	Phoenix	34	**23**	**18.3**	.573	.000	.472	**5.8**	0.9	**0.9**	**1.5**	0.4	**4.7**
**Career**	3 years, 3 teams	78	34	16.2	.574	.000	.526	5.1	0.9	0.7	1.3	0.6	4.1

==== Playoffs ====
WNBA playoff statistics
Year	Team	GP	GS	MPG	FG%	3P%	FT%	RPG	APG	SPG	BPG	TO	PPG
2024	Phoenix	2	0	13.0	**.636**	—	.000	3.5	0.5	0.0	0.5	**0.0**	**7.0**
2025	Phoenix	**11**	**11**	**14.0**	.556	.000	**1.000**	**3.9**	**0.7**	**0.4**	**0.7**	0.4	2.9
**Career**	2 years, 1 team	13	11	13.8	.579	.000	.667	3.8	0.7	0.3	0.7	0.3	3.5

=== College ===
College statistics
Year	Team	GP	Points	FG%	3P%	FT%	RPG	APG	SPG	BPG	PPG
2017–18	Angelina College	31	682	.580	**.333**	.662	**12.9**	1.5	1.7	5.1	22.0
2018–19	Angelina College	**33**	**791**	**.591**	.229	.645	11.6	**2.3**	1.6	**5.5**	**24.0**
2019–20	Oklahoma State	27	476	.516	.125	**.677**	12.5	0.9	1.5	3.6	17.6
2020–21	Oklahoma State	28	554	.529	.000	.634	12.4	**1.8**	**2.0**	4.0	19.8
**Career**		55	1,030	.523	.111	.653	12.4	1.4	1.9	3.8	18.7
