= 2019 McDonald's All-American Girls Game =

Basketball game

West	East
83	68
- Date: March 28, 2019
- Venue: State Farm Arena, Atlanta, Georgia
- MVP: Jordan Horston
- Network: ESPN

McDonald's All-American

The 2019 McDonald's All-American Girls Game was an all-star basketball game that was played on March 28, 2019, at State Farm Arena in Atlanta, Georgia. The game's rosters featured the best and most highly recruited high school girls graduating in the class of 2019. The game will be the 17th annual version of the McDonald's All-American Game first played in 2002. The 24 players were selected from over 700 nominees by a committee of basketball experts. They were chosen not only for their on-court skills, but for their performances off the court as well.

== Rosters ==
The roster was announced on January 24, 2019. Florida State, South Carolina, and Stanford had the most selections with three each.

=== Team East ===
ESPNW 100 Rank	Name	Height	Position	Hometown	High school	College choice
30	River Baldwin	6–5	P	Andalusia, Alabama	Pleasant Home	Florida State
11	Brea Beal	6–0	W	Rock Island, Illinois	Rock Island	South Carolina
3	Aliyah Boston	6–4	G	St Thomas, U.S. Virgin Islands	Worcester Academy	South Carolina
16	Jakia Brown-Turner	6–0	W	Oxon Hill, Maryland	Bishop McNamara	NC State
6	Samantha Brunelle	6–2	F	Ruckersville, Virginia	William Monroe	Notre Dame
4	Zia Cooke	5–9	PG	Toledo, Ohio	Rogers	South Carolina
21	Aubrey Griffin	6–1	W	Ossining, New York	Ossining	UConn
2	Jordan Horston	6–1	G	Columbus, Ohio	Columbus Africentric Early College	Tennessee
17	Diamond Miller	6–1	G	Somerset, New Jersey	Franklin (NJ)	Maryland
7	Ashley Owusu	5–9	PG	Woodbridge, Virginia	Paul VI (VA)	Maryland
38	Sammie Puisis	6–1	W	Mason, Ohio	William Mason	Florida State
40	Celeste Taylor	5–11	G	Valley Stream, New York	Long Island Lutheran	Texas

=== Team West ===
ESPNW 100 Rank	Name	Height	Position	Hometown	High school	College choice
19	Fran Belibi	6–1	F	Centennial, Colorado	Regit Jesuit	Stanford
8	Kierstan Bell	6–1	G	Alliance, Ohio	McKinley	Ohio State
20	Kennedy Brown	6–6	P	Derby, Kansas	Derby (KS)	Oregon State
23	Nyah Green	6–1	G	Allen, Texas	Allen (TX)	Louisville
37	Angel Jackson	6–5	P	Richmond, California	Salesian College Prep	USC
5	Rickea Jackson	6–2	W	Detroit, Michigan	Detroit Edison Academy	Mississippi State
1	Haley Jones	6–1	W	Santa Cruz, California	Archbishop Mitty	Stanford
12	Jordyn Oliver	5–10	G	Prosper, Texas	Prosper	Baylor
22	Charisma Osborne	5–9	PG	Moreno Valley, California	Windward School	UCLA
13	Jaden Owens	5–6	PG	Plano, Texas	Plano West	UCLA
18	Anaya Peoples	5–10	PG	Danville, Illinois	Shlarman Academy	Notre Dame
15	Ashten Prechtel	6–5	P	Colorado Springs, Colorado	Discovery Canyon Campus	Stanford
