= Angel Jackson =

American basketball player (born 2001)

Personal information
- Born: February 14, 2001 (age 25) Richmond, California, U.S.
- Listed height: 6 ft 6 in (1.98 m)

Career information
- High school: Salesian College Preparatory (Richmond, California)
- College: USC (2019–2022); Jackson State (2022–2024)
- WNBA draft: 2024: 3rd round, 36th overall pick
- Drafted by: Las Vegas Aces
- Playing career: 2024–present
- Position: Center

Career history
- 2024: Faenza Basket Project

Career highlights
- 2× SWAC Defensive Player of the Year (2023, 2024); 2× Second-team All-SWAC (2024); McDonald's All-American (2019)
- Stats at Basketball Reference

Angel Jackson (born February 14, 2001) is an American professional basketball player who is a free agent. She was selected by the Las Vegas Aces in the 2024 WNBA draft after playing college basketball at USC and Jackson State. In high school, she played for Salesian College Preparatory in Richmond, California. Jackson was named SWAC Defense Player of the Year both years she attended. On April 15, 2024, Jackson became the second HBCU player to be drafted in the last 20 years, joining Meshya Williams-Holliday, drafted in the 2022 WNBA draft.

== High school career ==
Jackson played basketball for Salesian College Preparatory in Richmond, California. During her junior season, she averaged 14.6 points, 10.5 rebounds, and one steal per game, leading her team to a 27–6 record and a regional semi-final appearance. Jackson was named to the San Francisco Chronicle All-Metro First Team and California All-State Girls Second Team. As a senior, she averaged 16.2 points, 12 rebounds, 1.3 steals, and one assist per game, helping her team reach the regional finals.

She committed to playing college basketball for USC over offers from other major programs, including Arizona State, California, and Florida.

== College career ==
As a true freshman, Jackson started three games and appeared in 30 games. She averaged 7.0 points and 4.9 rebounds per game and set a season high with 19 points on February 7, 2020. She recorded one double-double with 11 points and a career-high 14 rebounds on November 14, 2019. Jackson led the team with 32 blocks and was named to the South Point Shootout All-Tournament Team. As a senior, she averaged 9.2 points and 7.1 rebounds per game. While at JSU, she made the All-SWAC Second Team and won back-to-back Defensive Player of the Year. Jackson led her team to back-to-back SWAC tournament championships and the first round of the NCAA Women's Tournament.

== Professional career ==
=== WNBA ===
Jackson was selected as the thirty-sixth pick of the 2024 WNBA draft by the Las Vegas Aces. On 7 May 2024, Jackson was waived by the Las Vegas Aces.

=== Athletes Unlimited ===
On February 11, 2025, Jackson became the first HBCU player to join Athletes Unlimited Pro Basketball. Jackson played in the 2025 season and finished 34th in scoring with 2,257 leaderboard points, averaging 1.7 points and 1.9 rebounds in 8.7 minutes per game.

=== Lega Basket Femminile ===
In June 2024, Jackson signed to play in the Lega Basket Femminile for the Faenza Basket Project. She left the team in October 2024.

== Career statistics ==
Legend
| GP | Games played | GS | Games started | MPG | Minutes per game | RPG | Rebounds per game |
| APG | Assists per game | SPG | Steals per game | BPG | Blocks per game | PPG | Points per game |
| TO | Turnovers per game | FG% | Field-goal percentage | 3P% | 3-point field-goal percentage | FT% | Free-throw percentage |
| **Bold** | Career best | ° | League leader |

=== College ===
| Year | Team | GP | GS | MPG | FG% | 3P% | FT% | RPG | APG | SPG | BPG | TO | PPG |
|---|---|---|---|---|---|---|---|---|---|---|---|---|---|
| 2019–20 | USC | 30 | 3 | 19.5 | .453 | .000 | .740 | 4.9 | 0.7 | 0.2 | 1.1 | 1.3 | 7.0 |
| 2020–21 | USC | 20 | 12 | 21.9 | **.474** | .000 | .641 | 4.3 | **1.0** | **1.1** | 1.9 | 1.3 | 7.6 |
| 2021–22 | USC | 16 | 4 | 11.5 | .429 | .000 | .567 | 3.0 | 0.6 | 0.3 | 0.9 | 0.9 | 4.4 |
| 2022–23 | JSU | 31 | 26 | 22.9 | .424 | **.500** | .764 | **7.1** | 0.7 | 0.4 | 2.5 | **1.9** | 9.2 |
| 2023–24 | JSU | **33** | **33** | **25.2** | .468 | **.500** | **.812** | 6.8 | 0.9 | 0.9 | **2.9** | 1.3 | **10.0** |
| **Career** | | 130 | 78 | 21.1 | .451 | .500 | .746 | 5.6 | 0.8 | 0.6 | 2.0 | 1.4 | 8.1 |
Statistics retrieved from Sports-Reference.

== Personal life ==
Jackson is the daughter of Barbara Johnson and has four brothers.
