= Liz Dixon =

American basketball player (born 2000)

No. 20 – Panathinaikos
- Position: Center
- League: Greek League

Personal information
- Born: September 29, 2000 (age 26) Memphis, Tennessee, U.S.
- Listed height: 6 ft 5 in (1.96 m)
- Listed weight: 195 lb (88 kg)

Career information
- High school: Ridgeway (Memphis, Tennessee)
- College: Georgia Tech (2018–2019); Louisville (2019–2023)
- WNBA draft: 2023: undrafted
- Playing career: 2023–present

Career history
- 2023: Phoenix Mercury
- 2023: Connecticut Sun
- 2023–2024: Faenza Basket Project
- 2024: Phoenix Mercury
- 2024–present: Panathinaikos

Career highlights
- ACC All-Freshman Team (2019); McDonald's All American (2018)
- Stats at Basketball Reference

Elizabeth Dixon (born September 29, 2000) is an American professional basketball player for Panathinaikos of the Greek Women's Basketball League. She previously played for the Phoenix Mercury and the Connecticut Sun in the Women's National Basketball Association (WNBA). She played college basketball at Louisville and Georgia Tech.

== College career ==
Dixon came out of high school as the 19th overall ranked player according to ESPN HoopGurlz's rankings. She was named to the McDonald's All-American Game in 2018. Dixon committed to play for Georgia Tech in March 2017.

=== Georgia Tech ===
During her freshman season at Tech, Dixon started every game for the Yellow Jackets and was the third leading scorer on the team at 11.0 points per game. She was the named the Freshman of the Week three times during her tenure at Georgia Tech - November 19, January 14, and February 11th. She was also named to the ACC All-Freshman team for her freshman season.

Following her freshman season and the firing of head coach MaChelle Joseph, Dixon put her name into the transfer portal and decided that she would leave Georgia Tech.

=== Louisville ===
Dixon decided that she would transfer to Louisville about 4 weeks after entering the portal. She and fellow Georgia Tech freshman Elizabeth Balogun decided that they wanted to stick together and both chose the Cardinals. Dixon was cleared for immediate eligibility for the Cardinals after the NCAA ruled in favor of her in September 2019.

Dixon spent most of her career at Louisville coming off the bench for the Cardinals. She averaged 5.5 points, 3.9 rebounds, and 0.5 assists in her career there. During her 2021–2022 season, Dixon became the only player in that season to go 6-for-6 or better from the field in back-to-back games. During her graduate season, Dixon joined the 1,000th career point club in a January game.

== Professional career ==
=== WNBA ===
==== Phoenix Mercury (2023) ====
Dixon went undrafted during the 2023 WNBA draft, but she signed a training camp contract with the Phoenix Mercury on April 14, 2023. Dixon went through camp, but was ultimately cut from the Mercury before Opening Night. Dixon returned to the Mercury on a Hardship Contract on May 19, 2023. She made her WNBA debut on May 19, when the Mercury played the Los Angeles Sparks, playing 5 minutes. On May 21, Dixon was released from the Hardship Contract.

==== Connecticut Sun (2023) ====
On June 3, 2023, Dixon signed a contract with the Connecticut Sun. Dixon was waived by the Sun on July 14, 2023.

==== Phoenix Mercury (2023–2024) ====
Dixon returned to the Mercury on a 7-Day Contract in July 2023. Dixon remained with the Mercury until August 5 when her 2nd 7-Day Contract expired. Dixon signed back with the Mercury for a 2nd and 3rd 7-Day Contract before being let go from the contracts on August 24. Dixon stayed with the Mercury into the 2024 season. She played in sixteen games for the Mercury before being waived on July 2, 2024. On July 5, 2024, she was re-signed by the team to a seven-day contract, but ultimately waived upon its expiration on July 12.

== Career statistics ==
Legend
GP	Games played	GS	Games started	MPG	Minutes per game	RPG	Rebounds per game
APG	Assists per game	SPG	Steals per game	BPG	Blocks per game	PPG	Points per game
TO	Turnovers per game	FG%	Field-goal percentage	3P%	3-point field-goal percentage	FT%	Free-throw percentage
**Bold**	Career best	°	League leader

=== Regular season ===
Stats current through end of 2024 season

WNBA regular season statistics
Year	Team	GP	GS	MPG	FG%	3P%	FT%	RPG	APG	SPG	BPG	TO	PPG
2023	Connecticut	4	0	5.3	.400	—	—	0.5	0.3	0.0	0.3	0.5	1.0
2023	Phoenix	10	0	5.6	**.571**	—	**.875**	1.3	0.1	0.0	0.2	**0.2**	**2.3**
2024	Phoenix	**17**	0	**9.4**	.379	—	.800	**2.4**	**0.5**	**0.1**	**0.5**	0.5	1.8
**Career**	2 years, 2 teams	31	0	7.6	.438	—	.833	1.8	0.4	0.0	0.4	0.4	1.8

=== College ===
NCAA statistics
Year	Team	GP	Points	FG%	3P%	FT%	RPG	APG	SPG	BPG	PPG
2018–19	Georgia Tech	30	330	.512	.000	.714	6.4	0.8	0.6	1.1	11.0
2019–20	Louisville	32	141	.496	.000	.644	3.6	0.3	0.3	0.7	4.4
2020–21	Louisville	30	229	.564	.000	.745	5.4	0.4	0.4	1.2	7.6
2021–22	Louisville	34	179	.573	.000	.763	3.1	0.7	0.4	0.7	5.3
2022–23	Louisville	38	191	.536	.000	.725	3.8	0.5	0.3	0.9	5.0
**Career**		164	1070	.535	.000	.716	4.4	0.5	0.4	0.9	6.5
