= Charisma Osborne =

American basketball player (born 2001)

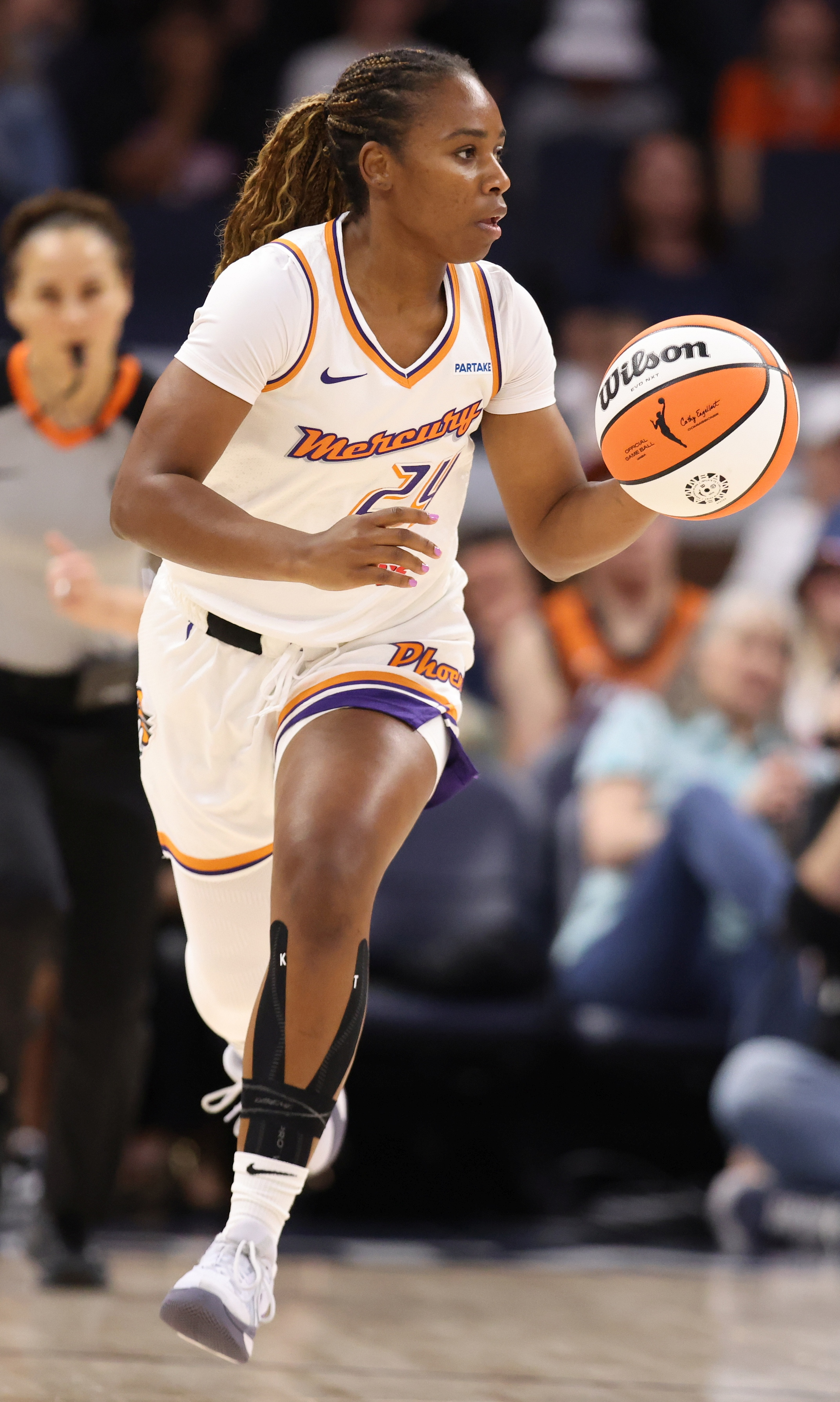
- Osborne with the Phoenix Mercury in 2024

No. 24 – Portland Fire
- Position: Guard
- League: WNBA

Personal information
- Born: July 3, 2001 (age 25) Fontana, California, U.S.
- Listed height: 5 ft 9 in (1.75 m)
- Listed weight: 166 lb (75 kg)

Career information
- High school: Windward School (Los Angeles, California)
- College: UCLA (2019–2024)
- WNBA draft: 2024: 3rd round, 25th overall pick
- Drafted by: Phoenix Mercury
- Playing career: 2024–present

Career history
- 2024: Phoenix Mercury
- 2026-present: Portland Fire

Career highlights
- 4× All-Pac-12 (2021–2024); 2× Pac-12 All-Defensive Team (2021, 2024); Pac-12 All-Freshman Team (2020); McDonald's All-American (2019); California Ms. Basketball (2018)
- Stats at Basketball Reference
Medals
Women's basketball
Representing the United States
FIBA AmeriCup
| Silver medal – second place | 2023 Mexico | Team |
FIBA Under-17 World Cup
| Gold medal – first place | 2018 Belarus | Team |

Charisma Osborne (born July 3, 2001) is an American professional basketball player for the Portland Fire of the Women's National Basketball Association (WNBA). She was drafted by the Mercury in the 2024 WNBA draft. She played college basketball at UCLA.

== Early life ==
Osborne played basketball for Windward School in Los Angeles under coach Vanessa Nygaard. As a sophomore, she led her team to a Division I state title. In her junior season, Osborne led Windward to the Open Division state championship and earned California Ms. Basketball honors. As a senior, she was selected to play in the McDonald's All-American Game and was named Los Angeles Times player of the year for a third consecutive season. Rated a five-star recruit by ESPN, she committed to play college basketball for UCLA over offers from Duke, Louisville, Ohio State and USC.

== College career ==
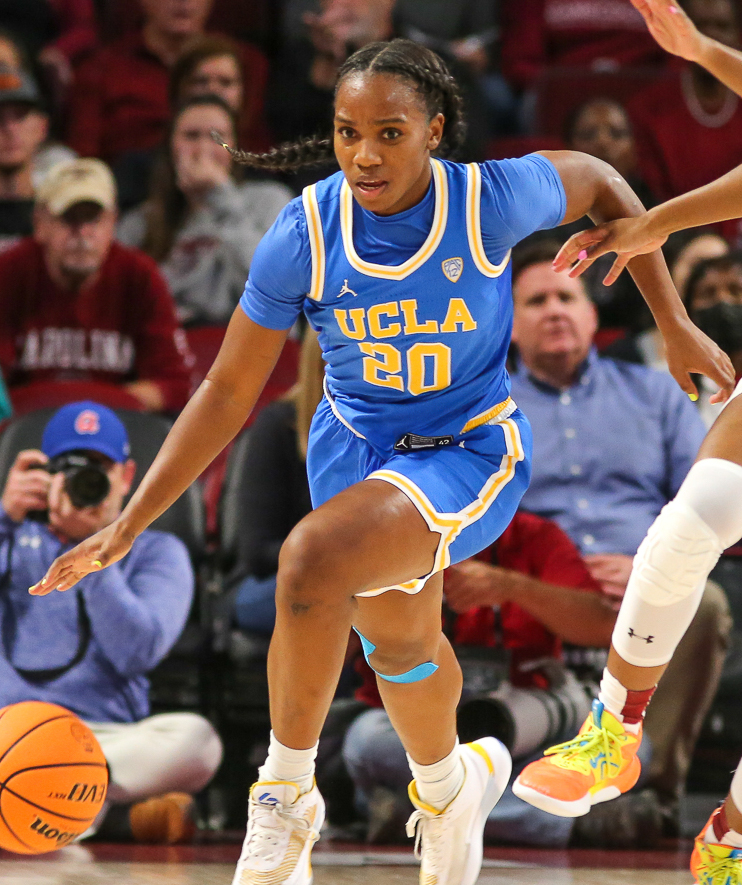
Osborne with UCLA in 2022

As a freshman at UCLA, Osborne averaged 12.2 points and 5.8 rebounds per game, receiving Pac-12 All-Freshman honors. She made 59 three-pointers, the most by a freshman in program history. On February 26, 2021, she posted her first career triple-double, with 18 points, 12 assists and 10 rebounds in a 93–51 win over USC. In her sophomore season, Osborne averaged 17 points, 5.8 rebounds and 3.8 assists per game and was an All-Pac-12 and Pac-12 All-Defensive Team selection. As a junior, she averaged 16.4 points, 5.1 rebounds and 3.9 assists per game, earning All-Pac-12 honors. In the second round of the 2023 NCAA tournament, Osborne scored a career-high 36 points in an 82–73 victory over Oklahoma. She averaged 15.9 points, 5.9 rebounds and 2.8 assists per game in her senior season and made the All-Pac-12 Team for her third straight year. Despite being a projected top-10 pick in the 2023 WNBA draft, Osborne returned to UCLA for a fifth season of eligibility, granted due to the COVID-19 pandemic. During her fifth season, she reached second on the all-time scoring list for UCLA women's basketball.

== Professional career ==
Osborne was chosen as the first pick of the third round (25th overall) by the Phoenix Mercury in the 2024 WNBA draft. On May 11, 2024, Osborne was waived by the Mercury. On June 13, 2024, Osborne was re-signed by the Mercury. However, she ended up playing in only two regular-season games in her rookie season, as she was struggling with injuries.

== National team career ==
Osborne won a gold medal playing for the United States at the 2018 FIBA Under-17 World Cup, where she averaged 4 points and 3.7 rebounds per game. She competed for the senior national team at the 2023 FIBA Women's AmeriCup in Mexico, averaging 5.1 points, 4.1 rebounds and a team-high 3 assists per game en route to a silver medal.

== Career statistics ==
Legend
| GP | Games played | GS | Games started | MPG | Minutes per game | RPG | Rebounds per game |
| APG | Assists per game | SPG | Steals per game | BPG | Blocks per game | PPG | Points per game |
| TO | Turnovers per game | FG% | Field-goal percentage | 3P% | 3-point field-goal percentage | FT% | Free-throw percentage |
| **Bold** | Career best | ° | League leader |

=== WNBA ===
==== Regular season ====
Stats current through end of 2024 season

WNBA regular season statistics
| Year | Team | GP | GS | MPG | FG% | 3P% | FT% | RPG | APG | SPG | BPG | TO | PPG |
|---|---|---|---|---|---|---|---|---|---|---|---|---|---|
| 2024 | Phoenix | 2 | 0 | 5.0 | .500 | — | — | 0.5 | 0.5 | 0.0 | 0.0 | 1.0 | 1.0 |
| **Career** | 1 year, 1 team | 2 | 0 | 5.0 | .500 | — | — | 0.5 | 0.5 | 0.0 | 0.0 | 1.0 | 1.0 |

=== College ===
NCAA statistics
| Year | Team | GP | GS | MPG | FG% | 3P% | FT% | RPG | APG | SPG | BPG | TO | PPG |
|---|---|---|---|---|---|---|---|---|---|---|---|---|---|
| 2019–20 | UCLA | 31 | 29 | 29.4 | .382 | .333 | .792 | 5.8 | 1.4 | 1.5 | 0.3 | **1.2** | 12.2 |
| 2020–21 | UCLA | 23 | 23 | 34.5 | .361 | **.340** | .868 | 5.8 | 3.8 | **1.7** | **0.4** | 2.0 | **17.0** |
| 2021–22 | UCLA | 28 | 28 | **35.5** | .362 | .331 | .875 | 5.1 | 3.9 | 1.5 | 0.2 | 2.4 | 16.4 |
| 2022–23 | UCLA | **36** | **36** | 33.1 | .387 | .292 | .832 | **5.9** | 2.8 | 1.4 | 0.3 | 1.9 | 15.9 |
| 2023–24 | UCLA | 34 | 34 | 32.9 | **.410** | .322 | **.892** | 5.2 | **4.0** | 1.6 | 0.3 | 1.9 | 13.9 |
| **Career** | | 152 | 150 | 32.9 | .381 | .323 | .853 | 5.6 | 3.1 | 1.5 | 0.3 | 1.9 | 14.9 |
