= 2024 WNBA playoffs =

Professional women's basketball tournament

- Dates: September 22 – October 20, 2024

Final positions
- Champions: New York Liberty
- Runners-up: Minnesota Lynx

Tournament statistics
- Attendance: 262,836
- Scoring leader (s): Napheesa Collier (Minnesota) (24.5 PPG)

Awards
- MVP: Jonquel Jones (New York)

The 2024 WNBA playoffs was the postseason tournament of the Women's National Basketball Association's 2024 season. The playoffs began on September 22, 2024, and ended on October 20, 2024 with the New York Liberty winning their first championship.

== Overview ==
=== Updates to postseason appearances ===
- The Connecticut Sun entered the postseason for the eighth consecutive season, the longest active postseason appearance streak in the WNBA.
- The Las Vegas Aces entered the postseason for the sixth consecutive season.
- The New York Liberty entered the postseason for the fourth consecutive season.
- The Atlanta Dream entered the post season for the second consecutive season.
- The Minnesota Lynx entered the postseason for the second consecutive season.
- The Phoenix Mercury returned to the postseason after missing the postseason in 2023.
- The Seattle Storm returned to the postseason after missing the postseason in 2023.
- The Indiana Fever entered the postseason for the first time since 2016, breaking their seven-season playoff drought.
- The Chicago Sky missed the postseason, ending a five-season postseason streak.
- The Dallas Wings missed the postseason, ending a three-season postseason streak.
- The Washington Mystics missed the postseason, ending a two-season postseason streak.
- The Los Angeles Sparks missed the postseason for the fourth consecutive season, the longest active postseason drought in the WNBA.

=== Notable occurrences ===
- The Indiana Fever broke their playoff drought, which was the longest in the WNBA, at seven seasons.
- An even number of Eastern Conference and Western Conference teams qualified for the playoffs.

== Format ==
The 2024 playoffs will be the final season to use the format that the WNBA Board of Governors approved prior to the 2022 season (starting in 2025, a best of seven WNBA finals will be adopted). In November 2021, the WNBA Board of Governors formalized a new playoff system that will structure the 2022 playoffs onward. The new playoff format scraps the single-elimination games of the first two rounds in favor of a best-of-3 quarterfinal round. As a result, all eight playoff teams, seeded according to overall regular season record regardless of conference (1 vs. 8, 2 vs. 7, 3 vs. 6, 4 vs. 5), will begin postseason play in the first round. In the first round series, the higher seeded team will host games 1 and 2, and the lower seeded team will host game 3 if necessary. In the semifinal round, no reseeding will take place, which means the winners of the 1 vs. 8 series will be paired with the winner of the 4 vs. 5 series as will the winners of the 2 vs. 7 and 3 vs. 6 series. The semifinal and final rounds will remain best-of-5 series in which the higher seeded team hosts games 1, 2 and (if necessary) 5 while the lower seeded team hosts games 3 and (if necessary) 4.

== Broadcast ==
All games will be aired across the ESPN family of networks, which includes ESPN, ESPN2, ESPNU, and ABC in the US and on TSN, Sportsnet, and NBA TV Canada in Canada.

== Playoff qualifying ==
Seed	Team	Record	Clinched	
Seed	Team	Record	Playoff berth	Top record
1	New York Liberty	32–8	August 17	September 17
2	Minnesota Lynx	30–10	August 24	No
3	Connecticut Sun	28–12	August 24	No
4	Las Vegas Aces	27–13	August 30	No
5	Seattle Storm	25–15	August 30	No
6	Indiana Fever	20–20	September 3	No
7	Phoenix Mercury	19–21	September 3	No
8	Atlanta Dream	15–25	September 19	No

== Bracket ==
**First round** Best-of-3
**1**	**New York Liberty**	**2**
8	Atlanta Dream	0
**4**	**Las Vegas Aces**	**2**
5	Seattle Storm	0
2	**Minnesota Lynx**	**2**
7	Phoenix Mercury	0
3	**Connecticut Sun**	**2**
6	Indiana Fever	0

**Semifinals**; Best-of-5
1	**New York Liberty**	**3**
4	Las Vegas Aces	1
2	**Minnesota Lynx**	**3**
3	Connecticut Sun	2

**Finals**; Best-of-5
1	**New York Liberty**	**3**
2	Minnesota Lynx	2

- **Bold** – Series winner
- Italic – Team with home-court-advantage

== First round ==
=== (1) New York Liberty vs. (8) Atlanta Dream ===
The top-seeded New York Liberty played the eighth-seeded Atlanta Dream in the first playoff series. The Liberty entered the post-season as the top overall seed after finishing two games ahead of the Minnesota Lynx during the regular season. The Liberty finished 7–3 in their final ten games of the season. The Dream secured a playoff spot after defeating the Liberty on the last day of the season. The Dream finished 5–5 in their final ten games of the season. During the regular season, the teams played four times, with the Liberty winning three times. Their last meeting was an Atlanta win on the final day of the season.

==== Game 1 ====
In game one of the series, the Liberty got off to a hot start at home, winning the first quarter 29–16. They did not let up in the second quarter, winning 19–14 and taking a fifteen-point lead into halftime. The Liberty continued their winning ways in the third quarter, taking the frame 21–19. The Dream mounted a comeback in the fourth quarter, winning 20–14, but they were too far behind and the Liberty won game one by fourteen points. The Liberty had four players score in double figures, and were led by Leonie Fiebich with twenty-one points. Breanna Stewart was not far behind with twenty, Sabrina Ionescu added seventeen, and Betnijah Laney-Hamilton scored ten. Stewart added eleven rebounds to finish with a double-double. The Dream only had two players in double figures, led by Rhyne Howard with fourteen, and Tina Charles added twelve.

ESPN, SN1

September 22
1:00 p.m. EDT

Box score

**New York Liberty** **83**, Atlanta Dream 69
Scoring by quarter: **29**–16, **19**–14, **21**–19, 14–**20**
Pts: Leonie Fiebich (21); Rebs: Breanna Stewart (11); Asts: Ionescu/Laney-Hamilton (5)	Pts: Rhyne Howard (14); Rebs: Tina Charles (7); Asts: Canada/Howard (4)

Barclays Center
Attendance: 12,115
Referees: Amy Bonner
Jeff Wooten
Isaac Barnett
Biniam Maru

==== Game 2 ====
Facing elimination, the Atlanta Dream started off Game Two well, winning the first quarter 28–19. However, the Liberty chipped away at the lead and won quarter two 24–20. The Dream took a five-point lead into halftime. The Liberty came out strong after the break and won the third quarter 22–16 to take a two-point lead into the final frame. There they continued their strong play and finished the game with a 26–18 win in the fourth quarter. The Liberty won the game by nine points and took the series two games to one. The Liberty had three players score in double figures, and were led by Sabrina Ionescu with thirty-six points. Jonquel Jones added twenty points and Breanna Stewart rounded out the double-digit scorers with thirteen. Jones recorded thirteen rebounds to have a double-double. The Dream also had three players in double figures, and were led by Allisha Gray with twenty-six points. Rhyne Howard added nineteen points and Tina Charles had fourteen points.

ESPN, TSN1

September 24
7:30 p.m. EDT

Box score

**New York Liberty** **91**, Atlanta Dream 82
Scoring by quarter: 19–**28**, **24**–20, **22**–16, **26**–18
Pts: Sabrina Ionescu (36); Rebs: Jonquel Jones (13); Asts: Sabrina Ionescu (9)	Pts: Allisha Gray (26); Rebs: Naz Hillmon (10); Asts: Jordin Canada (11)

Barclays Center
Attendance: 11,003
Referees: Roy Gulbeyan
Gina Cross
Fatou Cissoko-Stephens
Biniam Maru

Regular-season series
New York won 3–1 in the regular-season series

June 6, 2024

Report

**New York Liberty 78**, Atlanta Dream 61

Gateway Center Arena

June 23, 2024

Report

**New York Liberty 96**, Atlanta Dream 75

Gateway Center Arena

June 30, 2024

Report

Atlanta Dream 75, **New York Liberty 81**

Barclays Center

September 19, 2024

Report

**Atlanta Dream 78**, New York Liberty 67

Barclays Center

=== (2) Minnesota Lynx vs. (7) Phoenix Mercury ===
In the second playoff series, the second-seed Minnesota Lynx played the seventh-seed Phoenix Mercury. Minnesota finished two games out of first place during the regular season, and defeated eventual first seed New York on September 15. Minnesota enters the series after going 8–2 in their last ten games. Phoenix finished four games ahead of the eighth seed and only one game out of being the sixth seed. They struggled to end the season, finishing with a 3–7 record in their final ten games. The Western Conference teams played four times in the regular season, with Minnesota winning three times.

==== Game 1 ====
The Minnesota Lynx started Game One at home in dominating fashion, winning the first quarter 32–19. The second quarter was much closer, but Minnesota again won, this time 24–23. Minnesota took a fourteen-point lead into halftime. The Mercury came out strong in the third quarter, winning 27–21. The Mercury won the fourth quarter 26–25, but their comeback was not enough to overcome the halftime defect and Minnesota won Game One by seven points. The Lynx had four players score in double figures and were led by Napheesa Collier who scored thirty-eight points. Kayla McBride scored twenty points, Bridget Carleton added twelve, and Myisha Hines-Allen finished with ten from the bench. Phoenix also had four players score in double digits and were led by Natasha Cloud with thirty-three points. Diana Taurasi scored twenty-one, Kahleah Copper added sixteen, and Brittney Griner had ten points. Cloud finished with ten assists to record a double-double.

ESPN, NBA TV Canada

September 22
5:00 p.m. EDT

Box score

**Minnesota Lynx** **102**, Phoenix Mercury 95
Scoring by quarter: **32**–19, **24**–23, 21–**27**, 25–**26**
Pts: Napheesa Collier (38); Rebs: Carleton/Collier/Williams (6); Asts: Courtney Williams (8)	Pts: Natasha Cloud (33); Rebs: Cloud/Griner (6); Asts: Natasha Cloud (10)

Target Center
Attendance: 8,524
Referees: Maj Forsberg
Tim Greene
Charles Watson
Teresa Stuck

==== Game 2 ====
Facing elimination in Game Two, the Phoenix Mercury started strongly and won the first quarter 25–21. However, their run did not last long, as the Lynx came back to win quarter two 28–22 and take a two point lead into halftime. The Mercury struggled after half and lost quarter three 27–17. Quarter four was an even affair, finishing with the Lynx winning 25–24. The Lynx won the game by thirteen points and the series two games to zero. The Lynx had all five of their starters score in double figures and were led by Napheesa Collier who scored forty-two points to tie the WNBA playoff record for points in a game. Kayla McBride added fifteen points, Bridget Carleton and Alanna Smith both scored twelve points, and Courtney Williams added eleven. Phoenix also had five players score in double figures and were led by Brittney Griner with twenty-four points. Natasha Cloud scored sixteen points, Kahleah Copper scored thirteen points, Natasha Mack added twelve points from the bench, and Diana Taurasi scored ten points. Cloud finished with ten assists to record her second double-double in the series.

ESPN, NBA TV Canada

September 25
9:30 p.m. EDT

Box score

**Minnesota Lynx** **101**, Phoenix Mercury 88
Scoring by quarter: 21–**25**, **28**–22, **27**–17, **25**–24
Pts: Napheesa Collier (42); Rebs: Collier/Smith (5); Asts: Hiedeman (7)	Pts: Brittney Griner (24); Rebs: 4 players (5); Asts: Natasha Cloud (10)

Target Center
Attendance: 8,769

Regular-season series
Minnesota won 3–1 in the regular-season series

May 31, 2024

Report

Phoenix Mercury 71, **Minnesota Lynx 95**

Target Center

June 7, 2024

Report

Minnesota Lynx 80, **Phoenix Mercury 81**

Footprint Center

June 22, 2024

Report

Phoenix Mercury 60, **Minnesota Lynx 73**

Target Center

August 28, 2024

Report

**Minnesota Lynx 89**, Phoenix Mercury 76

Footprint Center

=== (3) Connecticut Sun vs. (6) Indiana Fever ===
The third-seed Connecticut Sun played the sixth-seed Indiana Fever in the third playoff series. The Sun entered the postseason as the third seed for the third straight season. They finished the regular season one game ahead of the fourth-seeded Aces and two games behind the second-seed Lynx. They finished the season 6–4 in their final ten games. The Fever entered the postseason for the first time in seven years. They were five games behind the fifth-seed Storm and one game ahead of the seventh-seed Mercury. They also finished the season 6–4 in their final 10 games. The two Eastern Conference foes played four times during the regular season with the Sun winning three times to the Fever's one win.

==== Game 1 ====
Game One started off as a close affair, as Connecticut won the first quarter 23–20. Connecticut carried their momentum into the second quarter and won it 23–19, to take a seven-point lead into halftime. Connecticut proved the stronger team after halftime and won the third quarter 22–19. However, the most lopsided quarter was the fourth, which Connecticut won 25–12 to win Game One by a twenty-four point margin. Connecticut had four players score in double-digits and were led by Marina Mabrey with twenty-seven points. DeWanna Bonner was not far behind with twenty-two points, DiJonai Carrington scored fourteen, and ended with twelve. The Fever also had four players score in double digits and were led by Kelsey Mitchell with twenty-one points. Aliyah Boston scored seventeen points, Damiris Dantas added twelve points off the bench, and Caitlin Clark scored eleven. Thomas added ten rebound and thirteen assists to record her fourth playoff triple-double. Boston added eleven rebounds to record a double-double in her playoff debut.

ABC, TSN2

September 22
3:00 p.m. EDT

Box score

**Connecticut Sun** **93**, Indiana Fever 69
Scoring by quarter: **23**–20, **23**–18, **22**–19, **25**–12
Pts: Marina Mabrey (27); Rebs: Alyssa Thomas (10); Asts: Alyssa Thomas (13)	Pts: Kelsey Mitchell (21); Rebs: Aliyah Boston (11); Asts: Caitlin Clark (8)

Mohegan Sun Arena
Attendance: 8,910
Referees: Roy Gulbeyan
Fatou Cissoko-Stephens
Jenna Reneau
Marcy Williams

==== Game 2 ====
The first quarter of game two was a low scoring affair, with the Sun winning 17–14. Scoring picked up slightly in the second quarter and the Sun won the second frame 24–20, and took a seven-point lead into halftime. Quarter three was again a close affair, and the Sun came out on top 20–18. Facing elimination and a nine-point defect, the Fever won the final frame, but only 29–26, which was not enough to win the game. Connecticut won game two by six points and the series two games to zero. Five of the seven players who saw minutes in the game for the Sun scored in double figures. They were led by Alyssa Thomas who scored nineteen points. Marina Mabrey scored seventeen points, DeWanna Bonner added fifteen and DiJonai Carrington and Veronica Burton both added ten. Thomas had thirteen assists to record a double-double. The Fever had three players score in double figures and were led by Caitlin Clark who scored twenty-five points. Kelsey Mitchell scored seventeen points and Aliyah Boston scored sixteen points. Boston added nineteen rebounds for her second double-double in the series.

ESPN, TSN5

September 25
7:30 p.m. EDT

Box score

**Connecticut Sun** **87**, Indiana Fever 81
Scoring by quarter: **17**–14, **24**–20, **20**–18, 26–**29**
Pts: Alyssa Thomas (19); Rebs: DeWanna Bonner (8); Asts: Alyssa Thomas (13)	Pts: Caitlin Clark (25); Rebs: Aliyah Boston (19); Asts: Caitlin Clark (9)

Mohegan Sun Arena
Attendance: 8,910
Referees: Angelica Suffren
Jeff Wooten
Isaac Barnett
Marcy Williams

Regular-season series
Connecticut won 3–1 in the regular-season series

May 14, 2024

Report

Indiana Fever 71, **Connecticut Sun 92**

Mohegan Sun Arena

May 20, 2024

Report

**Connecticut Sun 88**, Indiana Fever 84

Gainbridge Fieldhouse

June 10, 2024

Report

Indiana Fever 72, **Connecticut Sun 89**

Mohegan Sun Arena

August 28, 2024

Report

Connecticut Sun 80, **Indiana Fever 84**

Gainbridge Fieldhouse

=== (4) Las Vegas Aces vs. (5) Seattle Storm ===
The final first round series saw the fourth-seed Las Vegas Aces play the fifth-seed Seattle Storm. The two time defending champions Aces finished fourth in the regular season, one game behind the third-seed Sun, and two games ahead of their playoff opponents. The Aces enter the series after going 9–1 in their last ten games, with their only loss coming at first-seed New York. The Storm enter the post season after finishing two games behind the Aces and five games ahead of the sixth-seed Fever. They finished 6–4 in their final 10 games, but did win five of their last six. The Western Conference foes played four times during the regular season, with the Aces winning three times and the Storm winning once.

==== Game 1 ====
Seattle started Game One strongly on the road, winning the quarter 18–9. Las Vegas came back in the second quarter to win 29–24, however it was not enough to overcome the defect from quarter one and Seattle took a four point lead into halftime. Vegas came out of the half and cut into that lead, winning the third quarter 26–23, to cut Seattle's lead to one point heading into the fourth quarter. The Aces dominated the fourth quarter, holding Seattle to just two points, and won the quarter 14–2. The Aces took game one 78–67. Las Vegas had four players score in double figures, led by A'ja Wilson with twenty-one points. Tiffany Hayes scored twenty points off the bench, Chelsea Gray scored sixteen points, and Jackie Young added twelve. Seattle also had four players score in double figures and were led by Skylar Diggins-Smith with sixteen points. Gabby Williams scored fourteen points, Nneka Ogwumike added thirteen, and Jordan Horston scored ten off the bench. Ogwuimke recorded ten rebounds to have a double-double in the game.

ESPN, TSN2

September 22
10:00 p.m. EDT

Box score

**Las Vegas Aces** **78**, Seattle Storm 67
Scoring by quarter: 9–**18**, **29**–24, **26**–23, **14**–2
Pts: A'ja Wilson (21); Rebs: Stokes, Wilson (8); Asts: Chelsea Gray (7)	Pts: Skylar Diggins-Smith (16); Rebs: Mercedes Russell (12); Asts: Skylar Diggins-Smith (8)

Michelob Ultra Arena
Attendance: 10,369
Referees: Eric Brewton
Tiara Cruse
Angel Kent
Clare Aubry

==== Game 2 ====
Seattle faced elimination in Game Two and started slowly, with the Aces winning the first quarter 30–20. The second quarter was much lower scoring and Seattle ate into the Aces' lead. Seattle won the quarter 18–15 and the Aces took a seven-point lead into halftime. The lower scoring continued after the half, with the Storm winning the third quarter 19–17 and cutting the overall lead to five points. However, the Aces finished strong and won the forth quarter 21–19. Therefore, they won the game by seven points and the series two games to zero. The Aces had three players score in double figures and were led by Kelsey Plum who scored twenty-nine points. A'ja Wilson was not far behind with twenty-four points and Chelsea Gray scored twelve points. Wilson added thirteen rebounds to record a double-double. The Storm had four players in double figures, and were led by Gabby Williams with twenty points. Nneka Ogwumike scored sixteen points, Ezi Magbegor added fourteen, and Skylar Diggins-Smith scored thirteen. Ogwumike added ten rebounds and Diggins-Smith had ten assists to each record a double-double.

ESPN, TSN1

September 24
9:30 p.m. EDT

Box score

**Las Vegas Aces** **83**, Seattle Storm 76
Scoring by quarter: **30**–20, 15–**18**, 17–**19**, **21**–19
Pts: Kelsey Plum (29); Rebs: A'ja Wilson (13); Asts: Chelsea Gray (9)	Pts: Gabby Williams (20); Rebs: Nneka Ogwumike (10); Asts: Skylar Diggins-Smith (10)

Michelob Ultra Arena
Attendance: 10,370
Referees: Maj Forsberg
Tim Greene
Randy Richardson
Clare Aubry

Regular-season series
Las Vegas won 3–1 in the regular-season series

June 7, 2024

Report

**Seattle Storm 78**, Las Vegas Aces 65

Michelob Ultra Arena

June 19, 2024

Report

Seattle Storm 83, **Las Vegas Aces 94**

Michelob Ultra Arena

July 10, 2024

Report

**Las Vegas Aces 84**, Seattle Storm 79

Climate Pledge Arena

September 17, 2024

Report

**Las Vegas Aces 85**, Seattle Storm 72

Climate Pledge Arena

== Semifinals ==
=== (1) New York Liberty vs. (4) Las Vegas Aces ===
The top seed New York Liberty and fourth seed Las Vegas Aces faced-off in the first semifinal series, which was a re-match of the 2023 WNBA Finals. Both teams came in having swept their first round matchups. The Liberty won their two games by a combined twenty-three points over the eighth-seed Atlanta Dream and the Aces won their two games by a combined twenty-one points over the fifth-seed Seattle Storm. The teams met three times during the regular season, and the Liberty won all three games and two of the games were hosted in Las Vegas.

==== Game 1 ====
Game one in New York started with the Liberty winning the first quarter 28–21. The second quarter became closer as the Liberty won 20–17 to take a ten-point lead into halftime. The Aces came out of the halftime break strongly and won the third quarter 24–23. Their comeback stalled in the low-scoring fourth quarter, where the Liberty prevailed 16–15 and took Game one by ten points. The Liberty had three players finish in double figures, and were led by Breanna Stewart with thirty-four points. Sabrina Ionescu added twenty-one points, and Jonquel Jones finished with thirteen points. Jones recorded twelve rebounds to achieve her second double-double of these playoffs. The Aces also had three players score in double figures, and were led by Kelsey Plum with twenty-four points. A'ja Wilson added twenty-one points, and Jackie Young scored seventeen points.

ABC, NBA TV Canada

September 29
3:00 p.m.

Box score

**New York Liberty** **87**, Las Vegas Aces 77
Scoring by quarter: **28**–21, **20**–17, 23–**24**, **16**–15
Pts: Breanna Stewart (34); Rebs: Jonquel Jones (12); Asts: Sabrina Ionescu (5)	Pts: Kelsey Plum (24); Rebs: A'ja Wilson (6); Asts: A'ja Wilson (5)

Barclays Center
Attendance: 14,015
Referees: Eric Brewton
Gina Cross
Angelica Suffren
Kevin Fahy

==== Game 2 ====
The Aces started strongly after losing game one, and won the first quarter of game two 27–22. The second quarter turned out to be quite the opposite story, as the Liberty won 24–13 and took a six-point lead into halftime. Quarter three was a tight battle, and the Liberty prevailed 23–22. The Aces mounted a comeback and won quarter four 22–19, but it was not enough as they lost game two by four points. The Liberty took a commanding 2–0 series lead, winning both of the first two games in New York. The Liberty had four players score in double figures and were led by Sabrina Ionescu with twenty-four points. Breanna Stewart added fifteen points, Jonquel Jones scored fourteen, and Courtney Vandersloot scored twelve points. The Aces had five players score in double figures and were led by A'ja Wilson with twenty-four points. Jackie Young scored seventeen points, Chelsea Gray added fourteen, Alysha Clark scored thirteen points, and Tiffany Hayes scored ten points from the bench.

ESPN2, TSN1/3/4

October 1
7:30 p.m.

Box score

**New York Liberty** **88**, Las Vegas Aces 84
Scoring by quarter: 22–**27**, **24**–13, **23**–22, 19–**22**
Pts: Sabrina Ionescu (24); Rebs: Jonquel Jones (8); Asts: Breanna Stewart (8)	Pts: A'ja Wilson (24); Rebs: A'ja Wilson (7); Asts: Chelsea Gray (7)

Barclays Center
Attendance: 14,321
Referees: Maj Forsberg
Jeff Wooten
Randy Richardson
Teresa Stuck

==== Game 3 ====
The Las Vegas Aces faced elimination as the series moved to Las Vegas for Game Three. The Aces used the home court advantage to take a slight lead in quarter one, winning 26–23. The second quarter ended with the two teams tied, 26–26. The Aces took a slight three-point lead into halftime and the game appeared poised on a knife's edge. However, that was until the Aces dominated the third quarter, winning 21–6. The Liberty won the final frame 26–22, but it was not enough to overcome their third quarter loss. The Aces staved off elimination and won the game by fourteen points. The Aces had five players score in double figures and were led by Jackie Young who scored twenty-four points. Kelsey Plum scored twenty points, A'ja Wilson added nineteen, Tiffany Hayes scored eleven from the bench, and Chelsea Gray scored ten. Wilson added fourteen rebounds to record her first double-double of the series. The Liberty only had three players score in double figures, and were led by Breanna Stewart with nineteen points. Jonquel Jones added eleven points, and Leonie Fiebich scored ten.

ESPN2, TSN2

October 4
9:30 p.m.

Box score

**Las Vegas Aces** **95**, New York Liberty 81
Scoring by quarter: **26**–23, 26–26, **21**–6, 22–**26**
Pts: Jackie Young (24); Rebs: A'ja Wilson (11); Asts: Chelsea Gray (10)	Pts: Breanna Stewart (19); Rebs: Jones/Stewart (6); Asts: Ionescu/Vanersloot (5)

Michelob Ultra Arena
Attendance: 10,369
Referees: Roy Gulbeyan
Tiara Cruse
Jenna Reneau
Angel Kent

==== Game 4 ====
The Aces faced another elimination game at home in game four. The first quarter was fairly even and the Liberty won the quarter 23–19. The game continued to be close in the second quarter, and the Aces prevailed 19–18. The Liberty took a three-point advantage into halftime. The third quarter was a low scoring affair with the Aces coming out on top 13–12 and headed into the fourth trailing by two with their season on the line. In the fourth quarter, the Liberty found their offensive groove and dominated the quarter 23–11. The Liberty took game four on the road by fourteen-points and won the series three games to one. The Liberty had four players score in double figures, and were led by Sabrina Ionescu who scored twenty-two points. Breanna Stewart scored nineteen points, Jonquel Jones added fourteen, and Leonie Fiebich scored eleven. Stewart also had fourteen rebounds to record her first double-double of the series. The Aces had three players score in double figures, and were led by A'ja Wilson who scored nineteen points. Kelsey Plum scored seventeen points and Tiffany Hayes scored eleven points off the bench. Wilson grabbed ten rebounds to finish with a double-double.

ABC, SN360

October 6
3:00 p.m.

Box score

Las Vegas Aces 62, **New York Liberty** **76**
Scoring by quarter: 19–**23**, **19**–18, **13**–12, 11–**23**
Pts: Sabrina Ionescu (22); Rebs: Breanna Stewart (14); Asts: Breanna Stewart (5)	Pts: A'ja Wilson (19); Rebs: A'ja Wilson (10); Asts: Chelsea Gray (6)

Michelob Ultra Arena
Attendance: 10,374
Referees: Maj Forsberg
Tim Greene
Jeff Wooten
Fatou Cissoko-Stephens

Regular-season series
New York won 3–0 in the regular-season series

June 15, 2024

Report

**New York Liberty 90**, Las Vegas Aces 82

Michelob Ultra Arena

August 17, 2024

Report

**New York Liberty 79**, Las Vegas Aces 67

Michelob Ultra Arena

September 8, 2024

Report

Las Vegas Aces 71, **New York Liberty 75**

Barclays Center

=== (2) Minnesota Lynx vs. (3) Connecticut Sun ===
The second seed Minnesota Lynx and third seed Connecticut Sun faced-off in the second semifinal series. Both teams entered the series having swept their first round matchups. The Lynx won their two games by a combined twenty points over the seventh-seed Phoenix Mercury and the Sun won their two games by a combined thirty point margin over the sixth-seed Indiana Fever. The teams met three times during the regular season, with the Sun winning two games and the Lynx winning one game. All of their regular season matchups were decided by five points or fewer.

==== Game 1 ====
Game one was a back and forth affair where Connecticut started strong first quarter on the road, winning the quarter 23–16. The Lynx made a comeback in the second quarter and won 22–19. The Sun took a three-point lead into the half on the road. The Lynx came out of halftime and won the third quarter 24–15 to take a six-point lead into the final frame. The Sun played strong defense in a low scoring fourth quarter and won 16–8. The late surge allowed the Sun to win Game one by three points. The Sun had four players score in double figures, and were led by Marina Mabrey who scored twenty points. Alyssa Thomas added seventeen points, DiJonai Carrington scored thirteen points, and DeWanna Bonner scored ten points. Bonner and Thomas added eleven and ten rebounds respectively to record double-doubles. The Lynx had three players score in double figures, and were led by Napheesa Collier with nineteen points. Bridget Carleton scored seventeen points, and Kayla McBride scored twelve points.

ESPN, SN360

September 29
8:30 p.m.

Box score

Minnesota Lynx 70, **Connecticut Sun** **73**
Scoring by quarter: 16–**23**, **22**–19, **24**–15, 8–**16**
Pts: Napheesa Collier (19); Rebs: Napheesa Collier (9); Asts: Collier/Smith/Williams (4)	Pts: Marina Mabrey (20); Rebs: DeWanna Bonner (11); Asts: Alyssa Thomas (9)

Target Center
Attendance: 8,506
Referees: Roy Gulbeyan
Maj Forsberg
Angel Kent
Teresa Stuck

==== Game 2 ====
Game two started with a low scoring quarter, which was won by the Sun 10–9. The scoring picked up in the second quarter, and the Lynx won the quarter 24–20 to take a three-point lead into halftime. The game continued to be close after halftime with the Lynx winning the third quarter 22–19. The Sun mounted a comeback in the fourth quarter, winning 21–19, but it was not enough to overcome the Lynx. The Lynx won game two by four points to level the series at one game a piece. The Lynx had three players score in double figures, and were led by Courtney Williams who scored seventeen points. Alanna Smith added twelve points and Kayla McBride scored eleven points. Napheesa Collier missed out on a double-double by one point as she scored nine points and had twelve rebounds. The Sun had four players score in double figures, and were led by Alyssa Thomas who scored eighteen points. DeWanna Bonner scored seventeen points, Marina Mabrey added fifteen points, and DiJonai Carrington scored fourteen points. Thomas added ten rebounds to record a double-double.

ESPN2, TSN1/3/4

October 1
9:30 p.m.

Box score

**Minnesota Lynx** **74**, Connecticut Sun 70
Scoring by quarter: 9–**10**, **24**–20, **22**–19, 19–**21**
Pts: Courtney Williams (17); Rebs: Napheesa Collier (12); Asts: Napheesa Collier (5)	Pts: Alyssa Thomas (18); Rebs: Alyssa Thomas (10); Asts: Alyssa Thomas (7)

Target Center
Attendance: 8,796
Referees: Gina Cross
Tim Greene
Isaac Barnett
Jenna Reneau

==== Game 3 ====
Game three moved the series to Connecticut, but the Lynx took the initial momentum in the game, winning the first quarter 23–16. The Lynx kept their momentum in the second quarter, winning 25–20 to take a commanding twelve-point lead into halftime. The third quarter was closer than the first two, but the Lynx prevailed again, winning 20–18. The Sun mounted a comeback after facing a fourteen-point defect heading into the fourth quarter. They won the fourth 27–22 but it was not enough to overcome the defect. The Lynx won Game Three by eleven points and led the series two games to one. The Lynx had four players score in double figures, and were led by Napheesa Collier who scored twenty-six points. Courtney Williams added sixteen points, Kayla McBride scored thirteen, and Bridget Carleton scored twelve. Collier also had eleven rebounds to record her first double-double of the series. The Sun had all five starters score in double figures, but only one other player scored points. They were led by Brionna Jones who scored twenty-one points. DeWanna Bonner added sixteen points, Marina Mabrey added fourteen points, and DiJonai Carrington and Alyssa Thomas both scored thirteen points.

ESPN2, TSN2

October 4
7:30 p.m.

Box score

Connecticut Sun 81, **Minnesota Lynx** **90**
Scoring by quarter: 16–**23**, 20–**25**, 18–**20**, **27**–22
Pts: Brionna Jones (21); Rebs: Alyssa Thomas (9); Asts: Alyssa Thomas (7)	Pts: Napheesa Collier (26); Rebs: Napheesa Collier (11); Asts: Courtney Williams (8)

Mohegan Sun Arena
Attendance: 8,268
Referees: Eric Brewton
Jeff Wooten
Fatou Cissoko-Stephens

==== Game 4 ====
The Connecticut Sun faced elimination at home in Game Four, and again got off to a slow start. The Lynx won the first quarter 22–15. The second quarter was a high-scoring affair and ended with the teams each scoring 28 points. The Lynx held their seven-point lead going into halftime. The Sun returned from the half and upped their defensive game, only allowing thirteen points in the third quarter, and won 25–13. They took a five-point lead into the fourth, where they continued their strong play, winning the quarter 24–19. The Sun won Game Four by ten points to stave off elimination. The Sun had five players score in double figures, and were led by Tyasha Harris who scored twenty points. DeWanna Bonner and Alyssa Thomas each scored eighteen points, DiJonai Carrington scored fifteen points, and Marina Mabrey scored ten. Thomas had eleven assists to finish with her third double-double of the series. The Lynx had three players score in double figures, and were led by Napheesa Collier who scored twenty-nine points. Natisha Hiedeman scored sixteen points off the bench, and Courtney Williams scored eleven points. Collier had thirteen rebounds to finish with her second double-double of the series.

ESPN, TSN4

October 6
5:00 p.m.

Box score

**Connecticut Sun** **92**, Minnesota Lynx 82
Scoring by quarter: 15–**22**, 28–28, **25**–13, **24**–19
Pts: Tyasha Harris (20); Rebs: Bonner/Thomas (8); Asts: Alyssa Thomas (11)	Pts: Napheesa Collier (29); Rebs: Napheesa Collier (13); Asts: Kayla McBride (6)

Mohegan Sun Arena
Attendance: 7,849
Referees: Angelica Suffren
Tiara Cruse
Isaac Barnett
Randy Richardson

==== Game 5 ====
In a winner-take all Game Five, the Lynx used their home court advantage to storm out to a 31–18 first quarter win. The Lynx kept the momentum going in the second quarter, winning 22–16. They took a nineteen-point lead into halftime. In a low-scoring third quarter, the Sun eked out 14–12 win to cut the lead to seventeen. The Sun mounted a comeback in the fourth quarter, winning the quarter 29–23. However, it was not enough as the Lynx comfortably won Game Five by eleven points and took the series three games to two. The Lynx had only three player score in double figures, and were led by Napheesa Collier who scored twenty-seven points. Courtney Williams scored twenty-four points and Kayla McBride added nineteen points. Collier also recorded eleven rebounds to finish with her third double-double of the series. The Sun had four players score in double figures and were led by DiJonai Carrington who scored seventeen points. Brionna Jones scored sixteen points, DeWanna Bonner added fourteen, and Tyasha Harris scored twelve off the bench. Carrington and Jones recorded twelve and ten rebound respectively to earn double-doubles.

ESPN2, TSN3

October 8
8:00 p.m.

Box score

**Minnesota Lynx** **88**, Connecticut Sun 77
Scoring by quarter: **31**–18, **22**–16, 12–**14**, 23–**29**
Pts: Napheesa Collier (27); Rebs: Napheesa Collier (11); Asts: Courtney Williams (7)	Pts: DiJonai Carrington (17); Rebs: DiJonai Carington (12); Asts: Alyssa Thomas (6)

Target Center
Attendance: 8,769
Referees: Roy Gulbeyan
Tim Greene
Tiara Cruse
Fatou Cissoko-Stephens

Regular-season series
Connecticut won 2–1 in the regular-season series

May 23, 2024

Report

Minnesota Lynx 82, **Connecticut Sun 83** (OT)

Mohegan Sun Arena

July 4, 2024

Report

**Connecticut Sun 78**, Minnesota Lynx 73

Target Center

September 17, 2024

Report

**Minnesota Lynx 78**, Connecticut Sun 76

Mohegan Sun Arena

== WNBA Finals ==
=== (1) New York Liberty vs. (2) Minnesota Lynx ===
Game 1

ESPN, TSN3

October 10
8:00 p.m.

Box Score

New York Liberty 93, **Minnesota Lynx** **95** (OT)
Scoring by quarter: **32**–19, 12–**17**, 24–**25**, 16–**23**, Overtime: 9–**11**
Pts: Jonquel Jones (24); Rebs: Jonquel Jones (10); Asts: Fiebich/Laney-Hamilton/Vandersloot (4)	Pts: Courtney Williams (23); Rebs: Alanna Smith (9); Asts: Courtney Williams (5)

Barclays Center
Attendance: 17,732
Referees: Eric Brewton
Isaac Barnett
Fatou Cissoko-Stephens
Jenna Reneau

==== Game 2 ====
ABC, SN

October 13
3:00 p.m.

Box Score

**New York Liberty** **80**, Minnesota Lynx 66
Scoring by quarter: **31**–21, 18–18, 12–**14**, **19**–13
Pts: Breanna Stewart (21); Rebs: Jonquel Jones (9); Asts: Ionescu/Stewart (5)	Pts: Napheesa Collier (16); Rebs: Napheesa Collier (8); Asts: Courtney Williams (8)

Barclays Center
Attendance: 18,046
Referees: Roy Gulbeyan
Tiara Cruse
Fatou Cissoko-Stephens
Randy Richardson

==== Game 3 ====
ESPN, TSN1/3/4 (Note: TSN3 will join in progress at 9:00 p.m.)

October 16
8:00 p.m.

Box Score

Minnesota Lynx 77, **New York Liberty** **80**
Scoring by quarter: **28**–18, 15–**17**, 19–**26**, 15–**19**
Pts: Napheesa Collier (22); Rebs: Napheesa Collier (9); Asts: Courtney Williams (8)	Pts: Breanna Stewart (30); Rebs: Breanna Stewart (11); Asts: Sabrina Ionescu (6)

Target Center
Attendance: 19,521
Referees: Angelica Suffren
Maj Forsberg
Tim Greene
Randy Richardson

==== Game 4 ====
ESPN, TSN2

October 18
8:00 p.m.

Box Score

**Minnesota Lynx** **82**, New York Liberty 80
Scoring by quarter: 23–23, **23**–22, 18–18, **18**–17
Pts: Kayla McBride (19); Rebs: Napheesa Collier (9); Asts: Courtney Williams (7)	Pts: Jonquel Jones (21); Rebs: Breanna Stewart (11); Asts: Fiebich/Ionescu (5)

Target Center
Attendance: 19,210
Referees: Eric Brewton
Tiara Cruse
Isaac Barnett
Randy Richardson

==== Game 5 ====
ESPN, SN1

October 20
8:00 p.m.

Box Score

**New York Liberty** **67**, Minnesota Lynx 62 (OT)
Scoring by quarter: 10–**19**, **17**–15, **20**–10, 13–**16**, Overtime: **7**–2
Pts: Jonquel Jones (17); Rebs: Breanna Stewart (15); Asts: Sabrina Ionescu (8)	Pts: Napheesa Collier (22); Rebs: Alanna Smith (8); Asts: Kayla McBride (5)

Barclays Center
Attendance: 18,090
Referees: Roy Gulbeyan
Maj Forsberg
Tim Greene
Isaac Barnett

Regular-season series
Minnesota won 2–1 in the regular-season series

May 25, 2024

Report

New York Liberty 67, **Minnesota Lynx 84**

Target Center

July 2, 2024

Report

Minnesota Lynx 67, **New York Liberty 76**

Barclays Center

September 15, 2024

Report

**Minnesota Lynx 88**, New York Liberty 79

Barclays Center

=== Statistical leaders ===
The following shows the leaders in each statistical category during the 2024 playoffs.

Category	Player	Team	Games	Statistic
Points per game	Natasha Cloud	Phoenix Mercury	2	24.5 ppg
Rebounds per game	Aliyah Boston	Indiana Fever	2	15.0 rpg
Assists per game	Natasha Cloud	Phoenix Mercury	2	10.0 apg
Steals per game	Nneka Ogwumike	Seattle Storm	2	3.0 spg
Blocks per game	A'ja Wilson; Rhyne Howard	Las Vegas Aces; Atlanta Dream	6; 2	2.5 bpg

Through 2024 WNBA Finals
