= 2024 Phoenix Mercury season =

- Head coach: Nate Tibbetts
- Arena: Footprint Center

Results
- Record: 19–21 (.475)
- Place: 4th (Western)
- Playoff finish: 7th seed; Lost in First Round 0–2 to Minnesota Lynx

The 2024 Phoenix Mercury season was the 27th season for the Phoenix Mercury of the Women's National Basketball Association, and their first season under new general manager Nick U'Ren and head coach Nate Tibbetts. Prior to the season, interim coach Nikki Blue's contract was not renewed, and Tibbetts was hired on October 18, 2023.

The season tipped off on Tuesday, May 14, 2024, against the Las Vegas Aces in Las Vegas. The Mercury would go on to lose that game 80–89. However, they would win the next three games, including a ten-point win at Las Vegas, and three-point wins over Atlanta and Washington. However, they lost their final four games of the month, including a game against Connecticut where they scored only 47 points. They ended May 3–5. They began June by defeating Los Angeles at home. They lost in Seattle before winning their next two games. They would lose to Las Vegas before winning their next two games. The Mercury lost two of their last three games in June to finish to month 6–4. They opened July with a loss before winning their next three matches, including two against Dallas. THe would lose two games, before winning the final game before the Olympic break against Washington. They finished July 4–3. Their up and down season continued after the Olympic break as they alternated wins and losses for the first five games of the month. They finished the month by losing two games to finish 3–4. They entered September in the hunt for a playoff spot and lost four of their first five games in the month. However, they defeated Chicago and Los Angeles before losing the final game of the season to Seattle. The Mercury finished the month 3–5 and the season 19–21.

Their record saw them finish seventh in the WNBA, which qualified them for the playoffs. They faced off against the second seeded Minnesota Lynx in the First Round of the playoffs. They lost both games in Minnesota to lose the series two games to zero. The first game was closer as it finished 95–102, while the second was 88–101. Their nineteen wins more than doubled their win total from a season ago. It was the second time they qualified for the playoffs and were swept in the First Round in the past three years.

== Transactions ==
=== WNBA draft ===
Round	Pick	Player	Nationality	School/Team/Country
3	25	Charisma Osborne	United States	UCLA
3	29	Jaz Shelley	Australia	Nebraska

=== Transactions ===
Date	Transaction
October 28, 2023	Hired Nate Tibbetts as Head Coach
January 17, 2024	Extended a Qualifying Offer to Sug Sutton
January 27, 2024	Signed Sug Sutton to a Training Camp Contract
February 1, 2024	Signed Natasha Cloud
February 3, 2024	Acquired Rebecca Allen in exchange for Moriah Jefferson
February 3, 2024	Signed Christyn Williams to a Training Camp Contract
February 6, 2024	Acquired Kahleah Copper and the rights to Morgan Bertsch in exchange for Michaela Onyenwere, Brianna Turner, the third pick in the 2024 draft, Chicago's second round pick in the 2025 draft, Phoenix's 2026 first round pick, and the right to swap 2026 second round picks.
February 8, 2024	Signed Mikiah Herbert Harrigan to a Training Camp Contract
February 9, 2024	Signed Natasha Mack to a Training Camp Contract
February 13, 2024	Signed Amy Atwell to a Training Camp Contract
March 7, 2024	Signed Mya Hollingshed to a Training Camp Contract
March 15, 2024	Waived Kadi Sissoko
March 30, 2024	Re-Signed Brittney Griner
April 16, 2024	Signed Charisma Osborne and Jaz Shelley to Rookie Contracts
April 24, 2024	Signed Air Hearn, Bella Murekatete, and Desi-Rae Young to a Training Camp Contracts
April 28, 2024	Waived Desi-Rae Young
May 11, 2024	Waived Amy Atwell, Air Hearn, Mya Hollingshed, Bella Murekatete, Charisma Osborne, Jaz Shelley, and Christyn Williams
May 11, 2024	Signed Liz Dixon to a Training Camp Contract from waivers
June 10, 2024	Waived Morgan Bertsch
June 13, 2024	Signed Charisma Osborne
July 2, 2024	Waived Liz Dixon
July 5, 2024	Signed Liz Dixon to 7-day contract
July 12, 2024	Released Liz Dixon (contract ended)
July 12, 2024	Signed Celeste Taylor to 7-day contract
August 16, 2024	Released Celeste Taylor (contract ended)
August 18, 2024	Signed Monique Billings to 7-day contract
August 20, 2024	Acquired the rights to Klara Lundquist from the Washington Mystics in exchange for Sug Sutton and a 2025 3rd round pick
August 23, 2024	Signed Celeste Taylor to a second 7-day contract
August 25, 2024	Signed Monique Billings to a rest-of-season contract
August 30, 2024	Signed Celeste Taylor to a third 7-day contract
September 5, 2024	Signed Amy Atwell to a 7-day contract
September 6, 2024	Signed Celeste Taylor to a rest-of-season contract

=== Roster changes ===
==== Additions ====
Personnel	Signed/Trade	Former team
Rebecca Allen	Trade	Connecticut Sun
Morgan Bertsch	Trade	Chicago Sky
Monique Billings	Signed	Dallas Wings
Natasha Cloud	Signed	Washington Mystics
Kahleah Copper	Trade	Chicago Sky
Liz Dixon	Signed	Connecticut Sun
Mikiah Herbert Harrigan	Signed	—
Natasha Mack	Signed	—
Charisma Osborne	Draft	UCLA
Jaz Shelley	Draft	Nebraska
Celeste Taylor	Signed	Connecticut Sun

==== Subtractions ====
Personnel	Reason	New team
Morgan Bertsch	Waived	–
Skylar Diggins-Smith	Free Agency	Seattle Storm
Liz Dixon	Waived	–
Megan Gustafson	Free Agency	Las Vegas Aces
Moriah Jefferson	Trade	Connecticut Sun
Michaela Onyenwere	Trade	Chicago Sky
Shey Peddy	Free Agency	—
Jaz Shelley	Waived	—
Kadi Sissoko	Waived	—
Brianna Turner	Trade	Chicago Sky
Sug Sutton	Trade	Washington Mystics

== Roster ==
2024 Phoenix Mercury roster
Players
Coaches

Pos.	No.	Nat.	Name	Height	Weight	DOB	From	Yrs
G/F	11	(Australia)	Allen, Rebecca (injured)	6' 2" (1.88m)	162 lb (73kg)	1992-11-06	Australia	8
G	8	(Australia)	Atwell, Amy	6' 0" (1.83m)	165 lb (75kg)	1998-06-30	Hawaiʻi	1
F	25	(United States)	Billings, Monique	6' 4" (1.93m)	192 lb (87kg)	1996-05-02	UCLA	6
G	0	(United States)	Cloud, Natasha	5' 9" (1.75m)	160 lb (73kg)	1992-02-22	Saint Joseph's	8
G/F	2	(United States)	Copper, Kahleah	6' 1" (1.85m)	165 lb (75kg)	1994-08-28	Rutgers	8
G	9	(United States)	Cunningham, Sophie	6' 1" (1.85m)	170 lb (77kg)	1996-08-16	Missouri	5
C	42	(United States)	Griner, Brittney	6' 9" (2.06m)	205 lb (93kg)	1990-10-18	Baylor	10
F	21	(Anguilla)	Herbert Harrigan, Mikiah	6' 2" (1.88m)	152 lb (69kg)	1998-08-21	South Carolina	2
F	4	(United States)	Mack, Natasha	6' 3" (1.91m)	182 lb (83kg)	1997-11-03	Oklahoma State	1
G	24	(United States)	Osborne, Charisma (injured)	5' 9" (1.75m)	166 lb (75kg)	2001-07-03	UCLA	R
G/F	3	(United States)	Taurasi, Diana	6' 0" (1.83m)	163 lb (74kg)	1982-06-11	Connecticut	19
G	12	(United States)	Taylor, Celeste	5' 11" (1.8m)	167 lb (76kg)	2001-06-20	Ohio State	R

Head coach
(United States) Nate Tibbetts (South Dakota)
Assistant coaches
(United States) Kristi Toliver (Maryland)
(United States) Megan Vogel (South Dakota State)
(United States) Michael Joiner (Florida State)
Athletic trainer
(United States) Hanna Wengertsman (Boston University)
Strength and conditioning coach
(United States) Annalise Pickrel (Michigan State)

Legend

- (C) Team captain
- (DP) Unsigned draft pick
- (FA) Free agent
- (S) Suspended
- Injured

=== Depth ===
Pos.	Starter	Bench
PG	Natasha Cloud	Charisma Osborne
SG	Diana Taurasi
SF	Kahleah Copper	Rebecca Allen
PF	Sophie Cunningham	Monique Billings; Mikiah Herbert Harrigan
C	Brittney Griner	Natasha Mack

== Schedule ==
=== Pre-season ===
2024 pre-season game log
Total: 0–2 (Home: 0–1; Road: 0–2)
May: 0–2 (Home: 0–1; Road: 0–1)

Game	Date	Team	Score	High points	High rebounds	High assists	Location Attendance	Record
1	May 7	@ Seattle	L 59–85	Diana Taurasi (10)	Natasha Mack (7)	Brittney Griner (3)	Climate Pledge Arena	0–1
2	May 10	vs. Los Angeles	L 85–98	Kahleah Copper (16)	Natasha Mack (4)	Sug Sutton (5)	Footprint Center; 4,598	0–2

2024 pre-season schedule

=== Regular season ===
2024 game log
Total: 19–21 (Home: 10–10; Road: 9–11)
May: 3–5 (Home: 2–1; Road: 1–4)

Game	Date	Team	Score	High points	High rebounds	High assists	Location Attendance	Record
1	May 14	@ Las Vegas	L 80–89	Diana Taurasi (23)	Natasha Cloud (8)	Natasha Cloud (7)	Michelob Ultra Arena; 10,419	0–1
2	May 18	Atlanta	W 88–85	Kahleah Copper (38)	Natasha Mack (11)	Natasha Cloud (5)	Footprint Center; 10,251	1–1
3	May 21	@ Las Vegas	W 98–88	Kahleah Copper (37)	Sophie Cunningham (9)	Natasha Cloud (10)	Michelob Ultra Arena; 10,374	2–1
4	May 23	Washington	W 83–80	Copper, Taurasi (20)	Natasha Mack (9)	Natasha Cloud (10)	Footprint Center; 7,474	3–1
5	May 25	Dallas	L 92–107	Kahleah Copper (32)	Diana Taurasi (5)	Natasha Cloud (12)	Footprint Center; 8,339	3–2
6	May 28	@ Connecticut	L 47–70	Natasha Cloud (9)	Sophie Cunningham (9)	Kahleah Copper (4)	Mohegan Sun Arena; 6,489	3–3
7	May 29	@ New York	L 78–81	Kahleah Copper (20)	Kahleah Copper (9)	Sug Sutton (7)	Barclays Center; 9,182	3–4
8	May 31	@ Minnesota	L 71–95	Kahleah Copper (21)	Natasha Mack (10)	Natasha Cloud (7)	Target Center; 7,035	3–5

June : 6–4 (Home: 5–2; Road: 1–2)

Game	Date	Team	Score	High points	High rebounds	High assists	Location Attendance	Record
9	June 2	Los Angeles	W 87–68	Diana Taurasi (31)	Natasha Mack (12)	Natasha Cloud (12)	Footprint Center; 10,207	4–5
10	June 4	@ Seattle	L 62–80	Kahleah Copper (19)	Kahleah Copper (7)	Natasha Cloud (5)	Climate Pledge Arena; 8,133	4–6
11	June 7	Minnesota	W 81–80	Kahleah Copper (34)	Natasha Mack (7)	Natasha Cloud (10)	Footprint Center; 9,052	5–6
12	June 9	@ Dallas	W 97–90	Kahleah Copper (29)	Brittney Griner (7)	Cloud, Taurasi (7)	College Park Center; 5,568	6–6
13	June 13	Las Vegas	L 99–103	Brittney Griner (25)	Brittney Griner (9)	Cloud, Sutton (6)	Footprint Center; 9,325	6–7
14	June 16	Seattle	W 87–78	Kahleah Copper (30)	Brittney Griner (9)	Natasha Cloud (8)	Footprint Center; 9,444	7–7
15	June 18	New York	W 99–93	Griner, Taurasi (19)	Diana Taurasi (9)	Kahleah Copper (7)	Footprint Center; 9,824	8–7
16	June 22	@ Minnesota	L 60–73	Natasha Cloud (14)	Brittney Griner (7)	Natasha Cloud (5)	Target Center; 8,769	8–8
17	June 28	Los Angeles	W 92–78	Kahleah Copper (24)	Brittney Griner (11)	Natasha Cloud (7)	Footprint Center; 14,363	9–8
18	June 30	Indiana	L 82–82	Brittney Griner (24)	Rebecca Allen (9)	Natasha Cloud (7)	Footprint Center; 17,071	9–9

July : 4–3 (Home: 1–1; Road: 3–2)

Game	Date	Team	Score	High points	High rebounds	High assists	Location Attendance	Record
19	July 1	Connecticut	L 72–83	Copper, Griner (21)	Kahleah Copper (6)	Natasha Cloud (10)	Footprint Center; 8,445	9–10
20	July 3	@ Dallas	W 104–96	Kahleah Copper (34)	Brittney Griner (8)	Natasha Cloud (10)	College Park Center; 6,129	10–10
21	July 7	@ Los Angeles	W 84–78	Natasha Cloud (31)	Kahleah Copper (10)	Cloud, Copper (5)	Crypto.com Arena; 11,618	11–10
22	July 10	Dallas	W 100–84	Kahleah Copper (32)	Kahleah Copper (5)	Natasha Cloud (6)	Footprint Center; 11,601	12–10
23	July 12	@ Indiana	L 86–95	Kahleah Copper (36)	Natasha Mack (9)	Celeste Taylor (5)	Gainbridge Fieldhouse; 17,274	12–11
24	July 14	@ Connecticut	L 69–96	Kahleah Copper (17)	Brittney Griner (9)	Natasha Cloud (6)	Mohegan Sun Arena; 8,910	12–12
25	July 16	@ Washington	W 96–87	Brittney Griner (23)	Natasha Cloud (9)	Natasha Cloud (10)	Capital One Arena; 12,586	13–12

August : 3–4 (Home: 1–2; Road: 2–2)

Game	Date	Team	Score	High points	High rebounds	High assists	Location Attendance	Record
26	August 15	@ Chicago	W 85–65	Kahleah Copper (29)	Brittney Griner (9)	Cloud, Griner (6)	Wintrust Arena; 9,025	14–12
27	August 16	@ Indiana	L 89–98	Kahleah Copper (32)	Kahleah Copper (8)	Kahleah Copper (6)	Gainbridge Fieldhouse; 17,274	14–13
28	August 18	Chicago	W 86–68	Diana Taurasi (23)	Sophie Cunningham (10)	Diana Taurasi (5)	Footprint Center; 14,267	15–13
29	August 21	@ Atlanta	L 63–72	Kahleah Copper (22)	Cloud, Griner (8)	Diana Taurasi (4)	Gateway Center Arena; 3,260	15–14
30	August 23	@ Atlanta	W 82–80	Brittney Griner (22)	Sophie Cunningham (7)	Natasha Cloud (7)	Gateway Center Arena; 3,260	16–14
31	August 26	New York	L 70–84	Brittney Griner (22)	Cloud, Griner (6)	Natasha Cloud (7)	Footprint Center; 10,299	16–15
32	August 28	Minnesota	L 76–89	Cunningham, Taurasi (16)	Griner, Mack (7)	Natasha Cloud (8)	Footprint Center; 9,482	16–16

September : 3–5 (Home: 1–4; Road: 2–1)

Game	Date	Team	Score	High points	High rebounds	High assists	Location Attendance	Record
33	September 1	Las Vegas	L 79–97	Brittney Griner (24)	Kahleah Copper (6)	Diana Taurasi (7)	Footprint Center; 13,981	16–17
34	September 3	Atlanta	W 74–66	Kahleah Copper (28)	Brittney Griner (8)	Diana Taurasi (5)	Footprint Center; 7,639	17–17
35	September 5	Washington	L 77–90	Brittney Griner (15)	Natasha Mack (9)	Celeste Taylor (6)	Footprint Center; 7,709	17–18
36	September 7	@ Seattle	L 66–90	Diana Taurasi (18)	Brittney Griner (8)	Natasha Cloud (6)	Climate Pledge Arena; 14,066	17–19
37	September 13	Connecticut	L 69–88	Brittney Griner (26)	Brittney Griner (9)	Natasha Cloud (7)	Footprint Center; 14,190	17–20
38	September 15	@ Chicago	W 93–88	Brittney Griner (26)	Brittney Griner (10)	Natasha Cloud (11)	Wintrust Arena; 8,577	18–20
39	September 17	@ Los Angeles	W 85–81	Cunningham, Griner (14)	Celeste Taylor (5)	Natasha Cloud (12)	Crypto.com Arena; 11,294	19–20
40	September 19	Seattle	L 70–89	Brittney Griner (11)	Brittney Griner (8)	Copper, Taylor (5)	Footprint Center; 11,333	19–21

2024 season schedule

=== Playoffs ===
2024 playoff game log
First round vs. Minnesota Lynx
Lost Series: 0–2

Game	Date	Team	Score	High points	High rebounds	High assists	Location Attendance	Series
1	September 22	@ Minnesota	L 95–102	Natasha Cloud (33)	Cloud, Griner (6)	Natasha Cloud (10)	Target Center; 8,524	0–1
2	September 25	@ Minnesota	L 88–101	Brittney Griner (24)	4 players (5)	Natasha Cloud (10)	Target Center; 8,769	0–2

2024 playoff schedule

== Standings ==
#	Team	W	L	PCT	GB	Conf.	Home	Road	Cup
1	yx – New York Liberty	32	8	.800	—	16–4	16–4	16–4	5–0
2	cx – Minnesota Lynx	30	10	.750	2	14–6	16–4	14–6	4–1
3	x – Connecticut Sun	28	12	.700	4	14–6	14–6	14–6	4–1
4	x – Las Vegas Aces	27	13	.675	5	12–8	13–7	14–6	2–3
5	x – Seattle Storm	25	15	.625	7	13–7	14–6	11–9	4–1
6	x – Indiana Fever	20	20	.500	12	11–9	12–8	8–12	3–2
7	x – Phoenix Mercury	19	21	.475	13	10–10	10–10	9–11	3–2
8	x – Atlanta Dream	15	25	.375	17	7–13	8–12	7–13	1–4
9	e – Washington Mystics	14	26	.350	18	7–13	5–15	9–11	1–4
10	e – Chicago Sky	13	27	.325	19	5–15	6–14	7–13	1–4
11	e – Dallas Wings	9	31	.225	23	6–14	7–13	2–18	0–5
12	e – Los Angeles Sparks	8	32	.200	24	5–15	5–15	3–17	2–3

Notes

(#) – League Standing
c – Commissioner's Cup winners
y – Regular Season Champion
x – Clinched playoff berth
e – Eliminated from playoff contention
Source: Overall standings and Commissioner's Cup Standings

== Playoffs ==
**First round** Best-of-3
**1**	**New York Liberty**	**2**
8	Atlanta Dream	0
**4**	**Las Vegas Aces**	**2**
5	Seattle Storm	0
2	**Minnesota Lynx**	**2**
7	Phoenix Mercury	0
3	**Connecticut Sun**	**2**
6	Indiana Fever	0

**Semifinals**; Best-of-5
1	**New York Liberty**	**3**
4	Las Vegas Aces	1
2	**Minnesota Lynx**	**3**
3	Connecticut Sun	2

**Finals**; Best-of-5
1	**New York Liberty**	**3**
2	Minnesota Lynx	2

- **Bold** – Series winner
- Italic – Team with home-court-advantage

== Statistics ==
Legend
GP	Games played	GS	Games started	MPG	Minutes per game	RPG	Rebounds per game
APG	Assists per game	SPG	Steals per game	BPG	Blocks per game	PPG	Points per game
FG%	Field-goal percentage	3P%	3-point field-goal percentage	FT%	Free-throw percentage	TO	Turnovers per game
PF	Fouls per game		Team leader		League leader

=== Regular season ===
Phoenix Mercury Regular Season Team Statistics
Player	GP	GS	MPG	FG%	3P%	FT%	RPG	APG	SPG	BPG	TO	PF	PPG
Kahleah Copper	37	37	32.4	.435	.314	.807	4.5	2.3	0.8	0.1	3.0	3.3	21.1
Brittney Griner	30	30	28.7	.579	.500	.777	6.6	2.3	0.5	1.5	1.8	1.9	17.8
Diana Taurasi	36	36	29.0	.400	.333	.857	3.8	3.4	0.6	0.3	1.9	2.6	14.9
Natasha Cloud	38	38	33.3	.397	.308	.826	4.1	6.9	1.4	0.6	3.0	2.7	11.5
Sophie Cunningham	40	21	27.8	.429	.378	.870	3.9	2.0	1.0	0.3	1.0	2.3	8.4
Rebecca Allen	18	18	24.8	.417	.352	.667	3.9	1.1	0.9	0.7	1.0	1.9	7.4
Monique Billings ^{≠}	13	2	18.1	.434	.286	.800	4.2	0.5	0.9	0.5	1.1	1.9	4.9
Natasha Mack	40	11	15.5	.573	.000	.579	5.0	1.1	0.7	1.2	0.7	1.4	3.8
Celeste Taylor ^{≠}	15	4	20.0	.317	.200	.563	1.8	1.8	1.0	0.6	1.4	1.1	3.5
Mikiah Herbert Harrigan	31	3	10.8	.412	.327	.550	1.5	0.3	0.5	0.4	0.5	0.9	3.2
Sug Sutton^{†}	22	0	14.9	.306	.270	.692	1.1	2.4	0.6	0.0	1.3	1.1	2.9
Morgan Bertsch ^{‡}	8	0	9.8	.222	.143	.875	1.5	0.3	0.0	0.1	1.1	1.3	2.6
Amy Atwell ^{≠}	6	0	9.8	.267	.231	.800	1.0	1.0	0.0	0.2	0.3	0.5	2.5
Liz Dixon ^{‡}	17	0	9.4	.379	—	.800	2.4	0.5	0.1	0.5	0.5	0.8	1.8
Charisma Osborne ^{≠}	2	0	5.0	.500	—	—	0.5	0.5	0.0	0.0	1.0	0.5	1.0

^{‡}Waived/Released during the season
^{†}Traded during the season
^{≠}Acquired during the season

=== Playoffs ===
Phoenix Mercury Playoff Team Statistics
Player	GP	GS	MPG	FG%	3P%	FT%	RPG	APG	SPG	BPG	TO	PF	PPG
Natasha Cloud	2	2	36.5	.543	.462	.833	5.5	10.0	1.0	0.5	3.0	4.0	24.5
Brittney Griner	2	2	29.5	.520	.500	.700	5.5	0.0	0.5	2.0	2.0	3.0	17.0
Diana Taurasi	2	2	29.5	.423	.389	1.000	3.0	2.5	1.0	0.0	3.5	4.5	15.5
Kahleah Copper	2	2	29.5	.407	.364	.600	4.5	2.5	1.0	0.0	3.5	5.0	14.5
Natasha Mack	2	0	13.0	.636	—	.000	3.5	0.5	0.0	0.5	0.0	1.0	7.0
Sophie Cunningham	2	2	31.5	.500	.429	—	4.5	3.5	1.5	0.5	0.5	4.5	6.5
Monique Billings	2	0	14.0	.800	—	.000	3.5	0.5	0.5	0.0	0.0	1.0	4.0
Celeste Taylor	2	0	14.0	.667	.500	—	1.0	2.5	0.0	0.5	0.0	0.5	2.5
Mikiah Herbert Harrigan	2	0	1.5	—	—	—	0.0	0.0	0.0	0.0	0.0	0.0	0.0
Amy Atwell	1	0	1.0	—	—	—	0.0	0.0	0.0	0.0	0.0	0.0	0.0

== Awards and honors ==
Recipient	Award/Milestone	Date awarded	Ref.
Natasha Cloud	WNBA All-Defensive Second Team	September 29, 2024	
Kahleah Copper	Western Conference Player of the Week	May 28, 2024	
Kahleah Copper	WNBA All-Star	July 2, 2024	
Kahleah Copper	2024 Olympic Gold Medalist	August 11, 2024	
Kahleah Copper	AP All-WNBA Second Team	September 22, 2024	
Kahleah Copper	All-WNBA Second Team	October 16, 2024	
Brittney Griner	Western Conference Player of the Week	June 18, 2024	
Brittney Griner	WNBA All-Star	July 2, 2024	
Brittney Griner	2024 Olympic Gold Medalist	August 11, 2024	
Diana Taurasi	WNBA All-Star	July 2, 2024	
Diana Taurasi	2024 Olympic Gold Medalist	August 11, 2024	
