= 2021 Las Vegas Aces season =

- Head coach: Bill Laimbeer
- Arena: Michelob Ultra Arena

Results
- Record: 24–8 (.750)
- Place: 1st (Western)
- Playoff finish: 2nd seed, Lost in Semifinals to Phoenix Mercury 2–3

The 2021 Las Vegas Aces season was the franchise's 25th season in the Women's National Basketball Association (WNBA) and the 4th year the franchise was based in Las Vegas. The regular season tipped off on May 15, 2021 at the Seattle Storm.

The Aces started the season by splitting a two game set in Seattle in a rematch of last year's finals. After that set, they won four of their remaining five games in May, with their only other loss coming against Connecticut. They lost their opening game in June, but went on a five game winning streak from there. The streak was snapped in Minnesota, in overtime, in a one point loss to the Lynx. The Aces followed the loss with an overtime win against Seattle to finish out June 7–2. They carried their winning streak into July, winning the first two games of July. The streak was snapped, again in overtime, by the Mercury. They rounded out July with a loss and a win to finish 3–2 in the month. The Aces went into the Olympic break with a 15–6 overall record. They returned from the break with a 4–1 record in August, with the loss to the Sun surrounded by two wins. They closed out the season with a 5–1 record in September, including a four game winning streak. They finished the season with a 24–8 overall record, which earned the team the second seed in the 2021 WNBA Playoffs. 24 wins tied their franchise record for regular season wins with 2008.

As the second seed, the Aces earned a double bye into the Semifinals, and awaited the highest remaining seed from the Second Round. After the games of the First and Second Round, the highest remaining seed was the Phoenix Mercury. The Aces had home court advantage in the series, but lost two of their home games, despite a 13–3 home record in the regular season. The Aces couldn't win Game 5 at home, losing by three to end the series and their season.

== Transactions ==
=== WNBA draft ===
The Aces made the following selections in the 2021 WNBA draft.

Round	Pick	Player	Nationality	School/Team/Country
1	12	Iliana Rupert	France	Tango Bourges Basket (France)
2	14	Destiny Slocum	United States	Arkansas
3	36	Kionna Jeter	United States	Towson

=== Trades and Roster Changes ===
Date	Details
December 9, 2020	Exercised Team Option on G Jackie Young
January 13, 2021	Signed G Lindsay Allen and F Emma Cannon to Training Camp Contracts
January 13, 2021	Core C Liz Cambage
February 1, 2021	Re-Signed F Dearica Hamby
February 2, 2021	Signed G Chelsea Gray
February 11, 2021	Signed G Riquna Williams
February 15, 2021	Traded G Lindsay Allen and the 24th Pick in the 2021 Draft to Indiana in exchange for the 14th Pick in the 2021 Draft.
March 12, 2021	Re-Signed C Liz Cambage
April 18, 2021	Signed G Destiny Slocum to a Rookie Scale Contract
April 18, 2021	Signed F Lauren Manis, F Shakayla Thomas and C Kate Cain to Training Camp Contracts
April 19, 2021	Signed G Kionna Jeter to a Rookie Scale Contract
April 26, 2021	Waived G Kionna Jeter
April 29, 2021	Waived C Kate Cain
May 11, 2021	Waived F Lauren Manis and F Shakayla Thomas
May 29, 2021	Waived F Emma Cannon and signed F Joyner Holmes
June 28, 2021	Waived F Joyner Holmes
July 2, 2021	Signed C Kiah Stokes
September 2, 2021	Signed G Bria Holmes to a 7-Day Contract

== Roster ==
2021 Las Vegas Aces roster
Players
Coaches

Pos.	No.	Nat.	Name	Height	Weight	DOB	From	Yrs
C	8	(Australia)	Cambage, Liz	6' 8" (2.03m)	216 lb (98kg)	1991-08-18	Australia	4
G	12	(United States)	Gray, Chelsea	5' 11" (1.8m)	170 lb (77kg)	1992-10-08	Duke	6
F	5	(United States)	Hamby, Dearica (injured)	6' 3" (1.91m)	189 lb (86kg)	1993-11-06	Wake Forest	6
G	32	(United States)	Holmes, Bria	6' 3" (1.91m)	170 lb (77kg)	1994-04-19	West Virginia	4
G/F	35	(United States)	McCoughtry, Angel (injured)	6' 1" (1.85m)	173 lb (78kg)	1986-09-10	Louisville	11
C	19	(South Korea)	Ji-su, Park	6' 5" (1.96m)	206 lb (93kg)	1998-12-06	South Korea	2
G	10	(United States)	Plum, Kelsey	5' 8" (1.73m)	145 lb (66kg)	1994-08-24	Washington	3
G	24	(United States)	Slocum, Destiny	5' 6" (1.68m)	157 lb (71kg)	1997-09-09	Arkansas	R
C	41	(Turkey)	Stokes, Kiah	6' 3" (1.91m)	191 lb (87kg)	1993-03-30	Connecticut	5
G	2	(United States)	Williams, Riquna	5' 6" (1.68m)	165 lb (75kg)	1990-05-28	Miami (FL)	8
F	22	(United States)	Wilson, A'ja	6' 4" (1.93m)	195 lb (88kg)	1996-08-08	South Carolina	3
G	0	(United States)	Young, Jackie	6' 0" (1.83m)	165 lb (75kg)	1997-09-16	Notre Dame	2

Head coach
(United States) Bill Laimbeer (Notre Dame)
Assistant coaches
(United States) Tanisha Wright (Penn State)
(United States) Vanessa Nygaard (Stanford)
(United States) Sugar Rodgers (Georgetown)
Athletic trainer
(United States) Michelle Anumba (Duke)

Legend

- (C) Team captain
- (DP) Unsigned draft pick
- (FA) Free agent
- (S) Suspended
- Injured

== Game log ==
=== Preseason ===
2021 pre-season game log
May: 0–1 (Home: 0–1; Road: 0–0)

Game	Date	Team	Score	High points	High rebounds	High assists	Location Attendance	Record
1	May 2	Los Angeles Sparks	L 71–80	Scrimmage			Michelob Ultra Arena; No Fans	0–1
2	May 8	@ Los Angeles Sparks	T 85–85	Liz Cambage (21)	Dearica Hamby (9)	Wilson; Young; Gray; Plum (3)	Los Angeles Convention Center; No Fans	0–1–1

2021 pre-season schedule

=== Regular season ===
2021 game log
Total: 24–8 (Home: 13–3; Road: 11–5)
May: 5–2 (Home: 3–1; Road: 2–1)

Game	Date	Team	Score	High points	High rebounds	High assists	Location Attendance	Record
1	May 15	@ Seattle Storm	L 83–97	A'ja Wilson (24)	Dearica Hamby (9)	Plum; Williams; Wilson; Young (4)	Angel of the Winds Arena; 1,031	0–1
2	May 18	@ Seattle Storm	W 96–80	Jackie Young (21)	A'ja Wilson (11)	Chelsea Gray (7)	Angel of the Winds Arena; 1,001	1–1
3	May 21	Los Angeles Sparks	W 97–69	Chelsea Gray (18)	Hamby; Cambage (10)	Chelsea Gray (6)	Michelob Ultra Arena; 1,972	2–1
4	May 23	Connecticut Sun	L 65–72	A'ja Wilson (14)	Cambage; Wilson (7)	Chelsea Gray (5)	Michelob Ultra Arena; 1,954	2–2
5	May 26	@ Phoenix Mercury	W 85–79	Jackie Young (27)	A'ja Wilson (9)	Chelsea Gray (9)	Phoenix Suns Arena; 4,082	3–2
6	May 28	Indiana Fever	W 113–77	Dearica Hamby (25)	Liz Cambage (7)	Chelsea Gray (12)	Michelob Ultra Arena; N/A	4–2
7	May 30	Indiana Fever	W 101–78	Dearica Hamby (22)	Liz Cambage (13)	Chelsea Gray (5)	Michelob Ultra Arena; 1,981	5–2

June : 7–2 (Home: 4–0; Road: 3–2)

Game	Date	Team	Score	High points	High rebounds	High assists	Location Attendance	Record
8	June 1	@ Connecticut Sun	L 67–74	Liz Cambage (28)	Liz Cambage (7)	A'ja Wilson (6)	Mohegan Sun Arena; N/A	5–3
9	June 3	@ New York Liberty	W 94–82	A'ja Wilson (30)	A'ja Wilson (13)	Chelsea Gray (9)	Barclays Center; 1,389	6–3
10	June 5	@ Washington Mystics	W 96–93	Liz Cambage (24)	A'ja Wilson (15)	Chelsea Gray (8)	Entertainment and Sports Arena; 2,100	7–3
11	June 13	Dallas Wings	W 85–78	A'ja Wilson (28)	A'ja Wilson (14)	Jackie Young (5)	Michelob Ultra Arena; No Fans	8–3
12	June 15	New York Liberty	W 100–78	Kelsey Plum (32)	Liz Cambage (11)	Gray; Young (5)	Michelob Ultra Arena; 2,115	9–3
13	June 17	New York Liberty	W 103–76	Kelsey Plum (18)	Dearica Hamby (12)	Kelsey Plum (7)	Michelob Ultra Arena; No Fans	10–3
14	June 25	@ Minnesota Lynx	L 89–90 (OT)	A'ja Wilson (28)	Liz Cambage (20)	Chelsea Gray (7)	Target Center; 2,734	10–4
15	June 27	Seattle Storm	W 95–92 (OT)	A'ja Wilson (22)	A'ja Wilson (11)	Chelsea Gray (7)	Michelob Ultra Arena; 3,766	11–4
16	June 30	@ Los Angeles Sparks	W 99–75	Jackie Young (18)	Liz Cambage (11)	Chelsea Gray (8)	Los Angeles Convention Center; 746	12–4

July : 3–2 (Home: 1–2; Road: 2–0)

Game	Date	Team	Score	High points	High rebounds	High assists	Location Attendance	Record
17	July 2	@ Los Angeles Sparks	W 66–58	A'ja Wilson (20)	A'ja Wilson (10)	Chelsea Gray (4)	Los Angeles Convention Center; 959	13–4
18	July 4	Atlanta Dream	W 118–95	Kelsey Plum (23)	Cambage; Hamby (10)	Kelsey Plum (8)	Michelob Ultra Arena; 2,705	14–4
19	July 7	Phoenix Mercury	L 90–99 (OT)	A'ja Wilson (25)	A'ja Wilson (12)	Gray; Wilson (6)	Michelob Ultra Arena; 3,013	14–5
20	July 9	Minnesota Lynx	L 67–77	Kelsey Plum (18)	Kiah Stokes (12)	Chelsea Gray (5)	Michelob Ultra Arena; No Fans	14–6
21	July 11	@ Dallas Wings	W 95–79	Hamby; Wilson (22)	A'ja Wilson (13)	A'ja Wilson (8)	College Park Center; 2,533	15–6

August : 4–1 (Home: 2–0; Road: 2–1)

Game	Date	Team	Score	High points	High rebounds	High assists	Location Attendance	Record
22	August 15	Washington Mystics	W 84–83	A'ja Wilson (20)	A'ja Wilson (14)	Chelsea Gray (11)	Michelob Ultra Arena; 3,024	16–6
23	August 17	Washington Mystics	W 93–83	Kelsey Plum (24)	A'ja Wilson (14)	Plum; Wilson (5)	Michelob Ultra Arena; 3,241	17–6
24	August 24	@ Connecticut Sun	L 62–76	Chelsea Gray (15)	Camgabe; Williams (6)	Jackie Young (5)	Mohegan Sun Arena; 4,012	17–7
25	August 26	@ Atlanta Dream	W 78–71	A'ja Wilson (21)	A'ja Wilson (12)	Kelsey Plum (8)	Gateway Center Arena; 2,182	18–7
26	August 28	@ Indiana Fever	W 87–71	Riquna Williams (15)	Liz Cambage (9)	Gray; Plum (6)	Indiana Farmers Coliseum; N/A	19–7

September : 5–1 (Home: 3–0; Road: 2–1)

Game	Date	Team	Score	High points	High rebounds	High assists	Location Attendance	Record
27	September 2	Chicago Sky	W 90–83	Plum; Williams; Wilson (21)	Kiah Stokes (13)	Chelsea Gray (5)	Michelob Ultra Arena; 5,150	20–7
28	September 5	@ Chicago Sky	L 84–92	Kelsey Plum (23)	A'ja Wilson (12)	Chelsea Gray (5)	Wintrust Arena; 5,210	20–8
29	September 8	Minnesota Lynx	W 102–81	Jackie Young (29)	Jackie Young (10)	Chelsea Gray (14)	Michelob Ultra Arena; 5,663	21–8
30	September 13	Dallas Wings	W 85–75	Kelsey Plum (30)	A'ja Wilson (12)	Kelsey Plum (5)	Michelob Ultra Arena; N/A	22–8
31	September 17	@ Chicago Sky	W 103–70	Riquna Williams (22)	Kiah Stokes (13)	Stokes; Wilson (7)	Wintrust Arena; 4,911	23–8
32	September 19	@ Phoenix Mercury	W 84–83	Kelsey Plum (23)	Jackie Young (7)	Jackie Young (4)	Phoenix Suns Arena; 9,724	24–8

2021 season schedule

=== Playoffs ===
2021 playoff game log
Total: 2–3
Semifinals

Game	Date	Team	Score	High points	High rebounds	High assists	Location Attendance	Series
1	September 28	Phoenix	W 96–90	Riquna Williams (26)	A'ja Wilson (9)	Chelsea Gray (12)	Michelob Ultra Arena; 7,009	1–0
2	September 30	Phoenix	L 91–117	Kelsey Plum (25)	A'ja Wilson (9)	Gray; Wilson (7)	Michelob Ultra Arena; 6,432	1–1
3	October 3	@ Phoenix	L 60–87	Liz Cambage (13)	Dearica Hamby (7)	Jackie Young (3)	Desert Financial Arena; 7,090	1–2
4	October 6	@ Phoenix	W 93–76	Chelsea Gray (22)	A'ja Wilson (12)	Gray; Plum (6)	Footprint Center; 11,255	2–2
5	October 8	Phoenix	L 84–87	Gray; Plum (22)	Liz Cambage (11)	Chelsea Gray (6)	Michelob Ultra Arena; 9,680	2–3

2021 playoff schedule

== Standings ==
#	Team	W	L	PCT	GB	Conf.	Home	Road	Cup
1	x – Connecticut Sun	26	6	.813	–	12–3	15–1	11–5	9–1
2	x – Las Vegas Aces	24	8	.750	2	11–4	13–3	11–5	6–4
3	x – Minnesota Lynx	22	10	.688	4	10–5	13–3	9–7	7–3
4	x – Seattle Storm	21	11	.656	5	9–6	11–5	10–6	8–2
5	x – Phoenix Mercury	19	13	.594	7	6–9	7–9	12–4	5–5
6	x – Chicago Sky	16	16	.500	10	10–5	6–10	10–6	6–4
7	x – Dallas Wings	14	18	.438	12	7–8	7–9	7–9	3–7
8	x – New York Liberty	12	20	.375	14	6–9	7–9	5–11	5–5
9	e – Washington Mystics	12	20	.375	14	7–8	8–8	4–12	4–6
10	e – Los Angeles Sparks	12	20	.375	14	2–13	8–8	4–12	1–9
11	e – Atlanta Dream	8	24	.250	18	6–9	4–12	4–12	4–6
12	e – Indiana Fever	6	26	.188	20	4–11	4–12	2–14	2–8

Notes

(#) – League Standing
x – Clinched playoff berth
e – Eliminated from playoff contention
Source: Overall standings and Commissioner's Cup Standings

== Playoffs ==
**First round** single elimination Sept. 23
**5**	**Phoenix Mercury**	**83**
8	New York Liberty	82
**6**	**Chicago Sky**	**81**
7	Dallas Wings	64

**Second round** single elimination Sept. 26
4	Seattle Storm	80
**5**	**Phoenix Mercury**	**85**^{OT}
3	Minnesota Lynx	76
**6**	**Chicago Sky**	**89**

**Semifinals**; Best-of-5; Sept. 28 – Oct. 8
2	Las Vegas Aces	2
**5**	**Phoenix Mercury**	**3**
1	Connecticut Sun	1
**6**	**Chicago Sky**	**3**

**Finals**; Best-of-5; Oct. 10 – 17
5	Phoenix Mercury	1
**6**	**Chicago Sky**	**3**

Note: Teams re-seeded after each round.

- **Bold** – Game or series winner
- Italic – Team with home-court advantage

== Statistics ==
Legend
GP	Games played	GS	Games started	MPG	Minutes per game	RPG	Rebounds per game
APG	Assists per game	SPG	Steals per game	BPG	Blocks per game	PPG	Points per game
FG%	Field-goal percentage	3P%	3-point field-goal percentage	FT%	Free-throw percentage	TO	Turnovers per game
PF	Fouls per game		Team leader		League leader

=== Regular season ===
Player	GP	GS	MPG	FG%	3P%	FT%	RPG	APG	SPG	BPG	PPG
A'ja Wilson	32	32	31.9	44.4	100	87.6	9.3	3.1	0.9	1.3	18.3
Kelsey Plum	26	0	25.5	43.7	38.6	94.4	2.5	3.6	1.0	0.0	14.8
Liz Cambage	25	24	23.8	54.3	35.7	71.0	8.2	1.3	0.9	1.6	14.2
Jackie Young	32	32	31.8	50.5	25.0	83.3	4.1	3.2	1.1	0.3	12.2
Dearica Hamby	29	0	24.5	54.5	25.0	65.5	6.7	1.7	1.1	0.1	11.6
Chelsea Gray	32	32	28.9	45.4	38.0	88.9	2.9	5.9	1.2	0.3	11.1
Riquna Williams	32	32	26.0	44.4	41.7	92.0	2.6	1.6	0.8	0.4	10.5
Park Ji-su	25	0	8.9	32.7	0.0	83.3	1.8	0.8	0.1	0.6	2.0
Kiah Stokes	15	8	20.5	58.8	0.0	50.0	6.1	1.0	0.4	0.7	1.5
Destiny Slocum	21	0	6.4	31.8	33.3	60.0	0.9	0.6	0.1	0.0	1.0
Angel McCoughtry	1	0	0.0	0.0	0.0	0.0	0.0	0.0	0.0	0.0	0.0

== Awards and honors ==
Recipient	Award	Date awarded	Ref.
A'ja Wilson	Western Conference Player of the Month - June	July 1	
Chelsea Gray	WNBA All-Star Selection	June 30	
Liz Cambage	WNBA All-Star Selection	June 30	
Dearica Hamby	WNBA All-Star Selection	June 30	
A'ja Wilson	WNBA All-Star Selection	June 30	
A'ja Wilson	Western Conference Player of the Week	July 6	
Kelsey Plum	Western Conference Player of the Week	September 20	
Kelsey Plum	Western Conference Player of the Month - September	September 20	
Kelsey Plum	Sixth Woman of the Year	September 30	
Dan Padover	Basketball Executive of the Year	September 30	
A'ja Wilson	All-WNBA Second Team	October 15	
