= Aaliyah Wilson =

American basketball player (born 1998)

Free agent
- Position: Point guard / shooting guard
- League: WNBA

Personal information
- Born: August 28, 1998 (age 27) Muskogee, Oklahoma, U.S.
- Listed height: 5 ft 11 in (1.80 m)
- Listed weight: 172 lb (78 kg)

Career information
- High school: Muskogee (Muskogee, Oklahoma)
- College: Arkansas (2016–2017); Texas A&M (2018–2021)
- WNBA draft: 2021: 1st round, 11th overall pick
- Drafted by: Seattle Storm
- Playing career: 2021–present

Career history
- 2021: Indiana Fever

Career highlights
- McDonald's All-American (2016)
- Stats at Basketball Reference

Aaliyah Wilson (born August 28, 1998) is an American professional basketball player who is currently a free agent. She was selected 11th overall in the 2021 WNBA draft by the Seattle Storm and was traded to the Fever before the start of the season.

Wilson is a native of Muskogee, Oklahoma. As a player as Muskogee High School, Wilson was named a McDonald's All-American and a Jordan Brand Classic All-American. She participated in Team USA trials in 2016 and 2017.

Wilson started her college career at the University of Arkansas. She transferred to Texas A&M after her freshman season. During her senior season, she received first All-SEC honors for her career, was named to the All-SEC second team as a graduate student and received AP All-American honors. She averaged 10,1 points, 4.7 points, 2 assists, 1.4 steals, and 0.75 blocks with a 41% field goal percentage.

She was waived by the Fever on March 2, 2022.

== WNBA career statistics ==
Legend
GP	Games played	GS	Games started	MPG	Minutes per game	RPG	Rebounds per game
APG	Assists per game	SPG	Steals per game	BPG	Blocks per game	PPG	Points per game
TO	Turnovers per game	FG%	Field-goal percentage	3P%	3-point field-goal percentage	FT%	Free-throw percentage
**Bold**	Career best	°	League leader

=== Regular season ===
Year	Team	GP	GS	MPG	FG%	3P%	FT%	RPG	APG	SPG	BPG	TO	PPG
2021	Indiana	14	0	8.5	.231	.143	.500	0.9	0.6	0.2	0.1	0.6	1.1
Career	1 year, 1 team	14	0	8.5	.231	.143	.500	0.9	0.6	0.2	0.1	0.6	1.1

== Arkansas and Texas A&M statistics ==
Legend
GP	Games played	GS	Games started	MPG	Minutes per game
FG%	Field goal percentage	3P%	3-point field goal percentage	FT%	Free throw percentage
RPG	Rebounds per game	APG	Assists per game	SPG	Steals per game
BPG	Blocks per game	PPG	Points per game	**Bold**	Career high

Year	Team	GP	Points	FG%	3P%	FT%	RPG	APG	SPG	BPG	PPG
2016-17	Arkansas	26	125	28.7%	28.4%	66.7%	2.9	1.5	0.5	0.4	4.8
2017-18	Texas A&M	Sat due to NCAA transfer rules									
2018-19	Texas A&M	9	124	42.7%	34.4%	**86.7%**	4.1	2.7	1.7	**1.2**	**13.8**
2019-20	Texas A&M	**30**	195	35.8%	29.5%	50.0%	3.7	1.3	1.0	0.5	6.5
2020-21	Texas A&M	28	**356**	**43.9%**	**42.0%**	61.9%	**5.9**	**2.6**	**1.8**	0.9	12.7
Career		93	800	38.6%	32.7%	63.4%	4.2	1.9	1.2	0.7	8.6
