= N'dea Jones =

American professional basketball player

No. 31 – Fenerbahçe
- Position: Power forward
- League: Turkish Super League; EuroLeague Women

Personal information
- Born: May 25, 1999 (age 27) Atlanta, Georgia, U.S.
- Listed height: 6 ft 2 in (1.88 m)
- Listed weight: 172 lb (78 kg)

Career information
- College: Texas A&M (2017–2021)
- WNBA draft: 2021: 2nd round, 23rd overall pick
- Drafted by: Seattle Storm
- Playing career: 2021–present

Career history
- 2021–2022: Enisey Krasnoyarsk
- 2022: Explosivos de Moca
- 2023: Atenienses de Manatí
- 2024–: Fenerbahçe Alagöz Gelişim

Career highlights
- 2× First-team All-SEC (2020, 2021)
- Stats at Basketball Reference
Medals
Women's basketball
Representing the United States
FIBA 3x3 Under-23 World Cup
Silver medal – second place	2022 Bucharest	Team

N'dea Jones (born May 25, 1999) is an American professional basketball player who plays for Fenerbahçe Alagöz Gelişim. She played college basketball for the Texas A&M Aggies and was drafted 23rd overall in the 2021 WNBA draft. She plays the power forward position.

Jones is currently in law school pursuing a jurisprudence degree.

== High school career ==
Jones was born in Lawrenceville, Georgia. She attended Brookwood High School, where she averaged 17.7 points at 13.9 rebounds. She was the #79 recruit going into college and the #18 forward. Jones, a 4-star recruit, committed to Texas A&M in 2016.

== College career ==
Jones became Texas A&M's all-time leader in rebounds and double-doubles. She received All-SEC honors and an AP All-American honorable mention her senior year. She was also honored by the U.S. Basketball Writers Association and Women's Basketball Coaches Association (WBCA) All-America team, becoming the fourth Texas A&M player to be named to all three, including AP honors, in one season. She led the Aggies to three Sweet 16 appearances in the NCAA basketball tournament, missing the round only when the tournament was canceled due to the COVID-19 pandemic.

Jones has been named to the Naismith Memorial Basketball Hall of Fame and was a Katrina McClain Award semifinalist, an award for the nation's top power forward, in 2021.

== Texas A&M statistics ==
Legend
GP	Games played	GS	Games started	MPG	Minutes per game
FG%	Field goal percentage	3P%	3-point field goal percentage	FT%	Free throw percentage
RPG	Rebounds per game	APG	Assists per game	SPG	Steals per game
BPG	Blocks per game	PPG	Points per game	**Bold**	Career high

Year	Team	GP	Points	FG%	3P%	FT%	RPG	APG	SPG	BPG	PPG
2017–18	Texas A&M	23	32	.458	.000	**.714**	1.4	0.0	.3	.3	1.4
2018–19	Texas A&M	**34**	263	.459	.000	.570	11.3	1.1	0.9	**0.9**	7.7
2019–20	Texas A&M	30	331	.484	.286	.709	**11.7**	**1.4**	**1.4**	0.6	11.0
2020–21	Texas A&M	28	**338**	**.518**	**.333**	.688	10.3	1.0	1.0	0.6	**12.1**
Career	Texas A&M	115	964	.487	.263	.660	9.2	0.9	0.9	0.7	8.4

== 2021 WNBA draft ==
Jones declared for the WNBA draft in March 2021, and was drafted by the Seattle Storm in the second round of the 2021 WNBA draft. Jones was waived before the Storm's season opener.

== Professional career ==
She played for Enisey Krasnoyarsk from Russian Women's Basketball Premier League with 14.4 points, 9.4 rebounds and 1.9 assists statistics in 2021-22 season. In 2022-23 season, she played for Explosivos de Moca and Atenienses de Manatí from Baloncesto Superior Nacional Femenino in Puerto Rico. On 9 January 2024, Fenerbahçe Alagöz Gelişim declared that she will play with the team for 2023-24 season long.
