= List of WNBA career free throw percentage leaders =

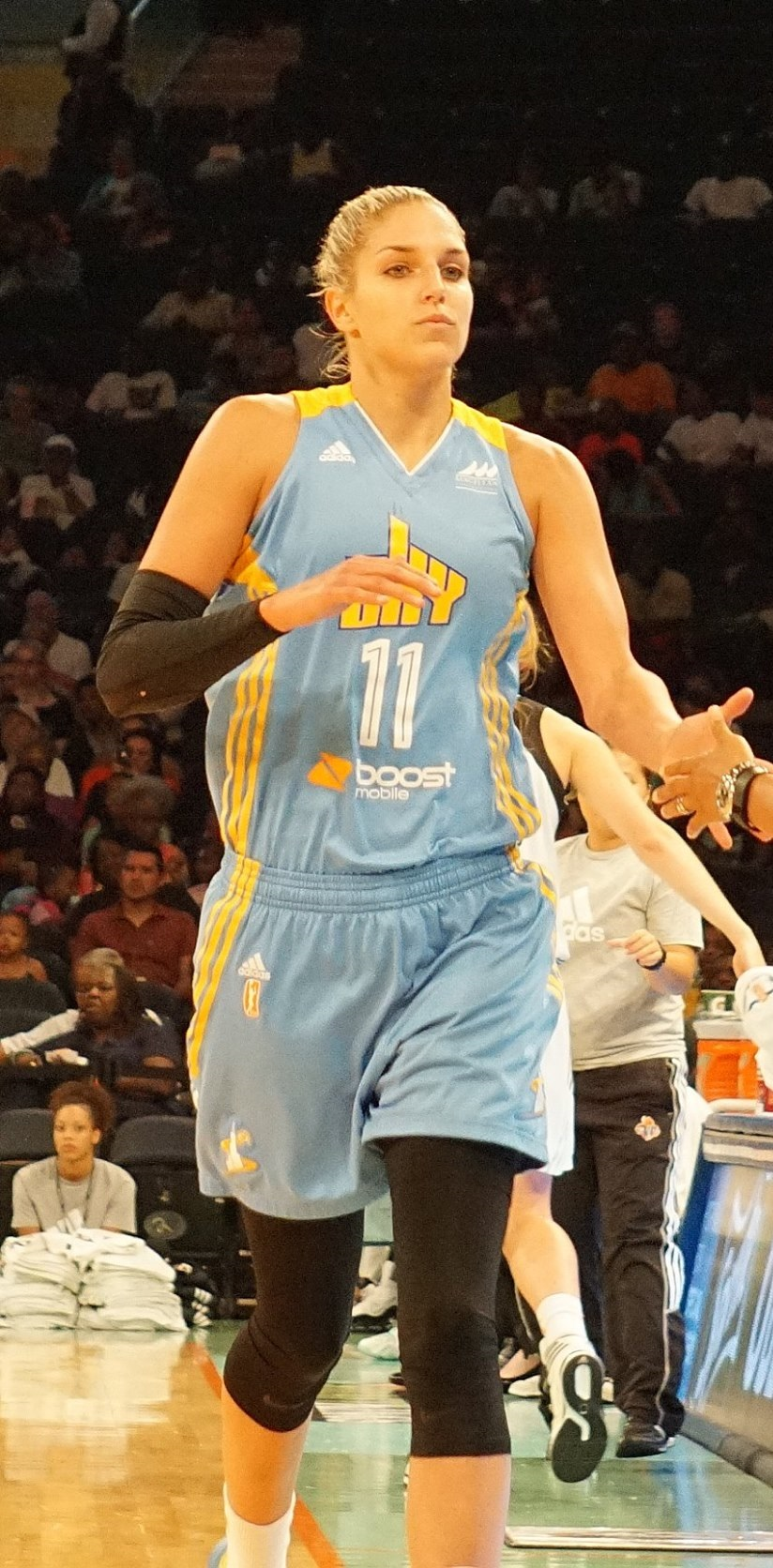
Elena Delle Donne has the highest free throw percentage in WNBA history.

This article contains a list of the top 25 players with the highest all-time free throw percentage in the history of the Women's National Basketball Association (WNBA).

== Free throw percentage leaders ==
Statistics accurate as of the 2026 season.

^	Active WNBA player
*	Inducted into the Naismith Memorial Basketball Hall of Fame
^{†}	Not yet eligible for Hall of Fame consideration

Rank	Player	Pos	Team(s) played for (years)	Free throw percentage	Free throws made	Free throws attempted
1	Elena Delle Donne*	SG / SF	Chicago Sky (2013–2016); Washington Mystics (2017–2023)	.9370	1,115	1,190
2	Sabrina Ionescu^	PG	New York Liberty (2020–present)	.9105	651	715
3	Kayla McBride^	SG	San Antonio Stars/Las Vegas Aces (2014–2020); Minnesota Lynx (2021–present)	.8986	1,232	1,371
4	Becky Hammon*	PG	New York Liberty (1999–2006); San Antonio Stars (2007–2014)	.8968	1,182	1,318
5	Allie Quigley	PG/SG	Phoenix Mercury (2008–2009); Indiana Fever (2010); San Antonio Silver Stars (2010); Seattle Storm (2011); Chicago Sky (2013–2022)	.8928	458	513
6	Kara Lawson	PG	Sacramento Monarchs (2003–2009); Connecticut Sun (2010–2013); Washington Mystics (2014–2015)	.8898	573	644
7	Shatori Walker-Kimbrough^	SG	Washington Mystics (2017–2019, 2021–2024); Phoenix Mercury (2020); Connecticut Sun (2021); Atlanta Dream (2025–present)	.8833	318	360
8	Nicole Powell	SG/SF	Charlotte Sting (2004); Sacramento Monarchs (2005–2009); New York Liberty (2010–2012); Tulsa Shock (2013); Seattle Storm (2014)	.8818	440	499
9	Paige Bueckers^	PG	Dallas Wings (2025–present)	.8796	263	299
10	Kristi Toliver^{†}	PG/SG	Chicago Sky (2009); Los Angeles Sparks (2010–2016, 2021–2022); Washington Mystics (2017–2019, 2023)	.8790	705	802
11	Jewell Loyd^	PG/SG	Seattle Storm (2015–2024); Las Vegas Aces (2025–present)	.8790	1,387	1,578
12	Kelsey Plum^	SG	San Antonio Stars/Las Vegas Aces (2017–2024); Los Angeles Sparks (2025–2026); Phoenix Mercury (2026–present)	.8787	869	989
13	Sonia Citron^	SG/SF	Washington Mystics (2025–present)	.8753	316	361
14	Tiffany Mitchell^{†}	SG	Indiana Fever (2016–2022); Minnesota Lynx (2023); Las Vegas Aces (2025)	.8744	703	804
15	Chelsea Gray^	PG	Connecticut Sun (2015); Los Angeles Sparks (2016–2020); Las Vegas Aces (2021–present)	.8724	759	870
16	Veronica Burton^	PG	Dallas Wings (2022–2023); Connecticut Sun (2024); Golden State Valkyries (2025–present)	.8714	393	451
17	Cynthia Cooper*	PG/SG	Houston Comets (1997–2000, 2003)	.8713	758	870
18	Jackie Young^	SG	Las Vegas Aces (2019–present)	.8704	779	895
19	Arike Ogunbowale^	PG/SG	Dallas Wings (2019–present)	.8701	1,045	1,201
20	Diana Taurasi^{†}	PG/SG	Phoenix Mercury (2004–2024)	.8700	2,517	2,893
21	Caitlin Clark^	PG	Indiana Fever (2024–present)	.8688	417	480
22	Penny Taylor	SF	Cleveland Rockers (2001–2003); Phoenix Mercury (2004–2016)	.8684	1,082	1,246
23	Janeth Arcain	SG	Houston Comets (1997–2005)	.8670	580	669
24	Epiphanny Prince	PG	Chicago Sky (2010–2014); New York Liberty (2015–2018, 2020–2022); Las Vegas Aces (2019)	.8646	709	820
25	Riquna Williams	PG/SG	Tulsa Shock(2012–2015); Los Angeles Sparks (2017–2020); Las Vegas Aces (2021–2022)	.8625	508	589

== See also ==
- List of National Basketball Association career free throw percentage leaders
- List of Women's National Basketball Association annual free throw percentage leaders
