= Destiny Slocum =

American basketball player (born 1997)

No. 24 – Basket Landes
- Position: Point guard
- League: La Boulangère Wonderligue

Personal information
- Born: September 9, 1997 (age 29) Boise, Idaho, U.S.
- Listed height: 5 ft 7 in (1.70 m)
- Listed weight: 155 lb (70 kg)

Career information
- High school: Mountain View (Meridian, Idaho)
- College: Maryland (2016–2017); Oregon State (2017–2020); Arkansas (2020–2021)
- WNBA draft: 2021: 2nd round, 14th overall pick
- Drafted by: Las Vegas Aces
- Playing career: 2021–present

Career history
- 2021: Las Vegas Aces
- 2021–2022: Kayseri Basketbol
- 2022: Landerneau
- 2022: Atlanta Dream
- 2022: Botaş SK
- 2023: Hatayspor
- 2023: Toulouse MB
- 2023–2024: Győr
- 2024–present: Basket Landes

Career highlights
- 2× All Pac-12 (2019, 2020); WBCA Freshman of the Year (2017); Big Ten Freshman of the Year (2017); Big Ten All-Freshman Team (2017); McDonald's All-American (2016)
- Stats at Basketball Reference
Medals
Women's basketball
Representing the United States
FIBA Under-19 World Cup
Gold medal – first place	2015 Russia	Team

Destiny Slocum (born September 9, 1997) is an American basketball player for AZS UMCS Lublin of the Basket Liga Kobiet. She played college basketball for the Arkansas Razorbacks. She played in the WNBA for the Las Vegas Aces and the Atlanta Dream.

She was a 2016 McDonald's High School All-American who played her Freshman year at the University of Maryland and was named WBCA Freshman of the Year. She then transferred to Oregon State and was required to sit out a season per NCAA rules. Following the 2018–2019 season, she was named an honorable mention All-American by the Women's Basketball Coaches Association and Associated Press.

In April 2020, she announced that she was entering the Transfer Portal, planning to leave Oregon State. She has one year left of eligibility. Later that month, Slocum, announced that she was transferring to Arkansas.

== Collegiate statistics ==
Legend
GP	Games played	GS	Games started	MPG	Minutes per game
FG%	Field goal percentage	3P%	3-point field goal percentage	FT%	Free throw percentage
RPG	Rebounds per game	APG	Assists per game	SPG	Steals per game
BPG	Blocks per game	PPG	Points per game	**Bold**	Career high

Year	Team	GP	Points	FG%	3P%	FT%	RPG	APG	SPG	BPG	PPG
2016–17	Maryland	**34**	392	40.5%	37.4%	66.3%	3.0	**6.0**	**1.3**	0.1	11.5
2017–18	Oregon State	Sat due to NCAA transfer rules									
2018–19	Oregon State	**34**	**525**	45.6%	36.8%	72.0%	**3.4**	4.5	0.6	**0.1**	**15.4**
2019–20	Oregon State	32	477	44.8%	36.8%	**78.9%**	2.9	4.7	0.7	0.0	14.9
2020–21	Arkansas	27	406	**48.3%**	**39.7%**	71.4%	3.3	3.9	0.8	0.0	15.0
Career		127	1800	44.8%	37.5%	71.9%	3.1	4.8	0.8	0.1	14.2

== WNBA career statistics ==
Legend
GP	Games played	GS	Games started	MPG	Minutes per game	RPG	Rebounds per game
APG	Assists per game	SPG	Steals per game	BPG	Blocks per game	PPG	Points per game
TO	Turnovers per game	FG%	Field-goal percentage	3P%	3-point field-goal percentage	FT%	Free-throw percentage
**Bold**	Career best	°	League leader

=== Regular season ===
Year	Team	GP	GS	MPG	FG%	3P%	FT%	RPG	APG	SPG	BPG	TO	PPG
2021	Las Vegas	**21**	0	6.3	.318	**.333**	**.600**	0.9	0.6	**0.1**	0.0	**0.3**	1.0
2022	Atlanta	3	0	**13.7**	**.364**	**.333**	**.600**	**1.3**	**1.3**	0.0	0.0	1.7	**4.7**
Career	2 years, 2 teams	24	0	7.3	.333	.333	.600	1.0	0.7	0.1	0.0	0.5	1.5

=== Postseason ===
Year	Team	GP	GS	MPG	FG%	3P%	FT%	RPG	APG	SPG	BPG	TO	PPG
2021	Las Vegas	3	0	4.3	.500	.000	.000	0.0	0.0	0.0	0.0	0.0	0.7
Career	1 year, 1 team	3	0	4.3	.500	.000	.000	0.0	0.0	0.0	0.0	0.0	0.7
