= 2016 McDonald's All-American Girls Game =

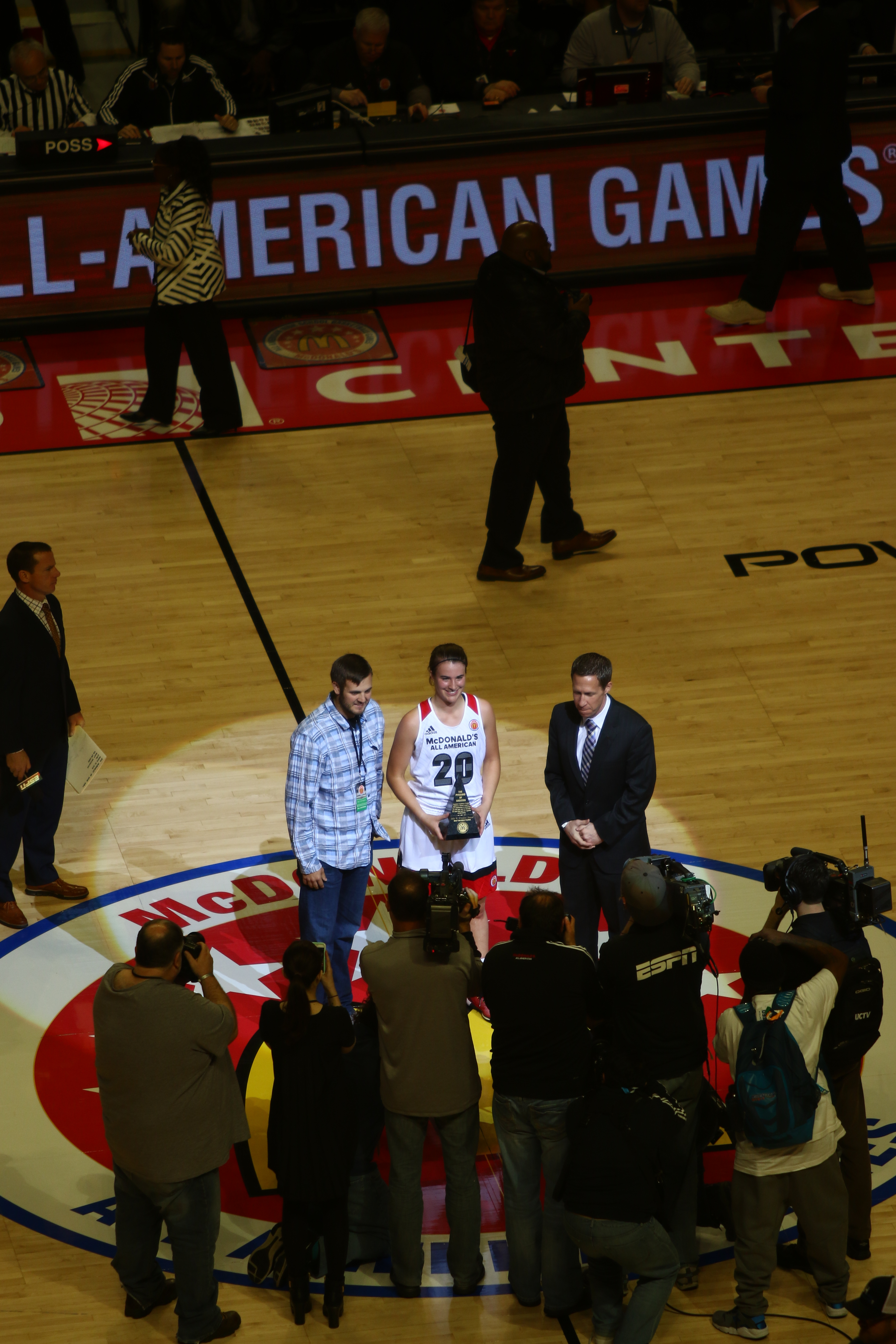
- 2016 McDonald's All-American Girls Game
| East | West |
|---|---|
| 88 | 97 |
- Date: March 30, 2016
- Venue: United Center, Chicago, Illinois
- MVP: Sabrina Ionescu
- Network: ESPNU

McDonald's All-American

The 2016 McDonald's All-American Girls Game is an All-Star basketball game that was played on March 30, 2016, at the United Center in Chicago, Illinois, home of the Chicago Bulls. The game's rosters featured the best and most highly recruited high school girls graduating in 2016. The game is the 15th annual version of the McDonald's All-American Game first played in 2002.

== 2016 Game ==
The 2016 McDonald's Game featured one of the highest scoring games in history on the girls' side. The West ultimately ended up winning by a final score of 97–88 in overtime. This was the game's first overtime in history - boys or girls. Sabrina Ionescu also made history by scoring 25 points - a new scoring record for the game. The record was previously held by Elizabeth Williams.

The West came back to tie the game 86–86 with just less than a minute left on a three-pointer from Lauren Cox. The game went into overtime and while the East was able to score first, the West ended the game with an 11–0 run to secure the victory.

=== 2016 East Roster ===
| ESPNW 100 Rank | Name | Height | Position | Hometown | High school | College choice |
|---|---|---|---|---|---|---|
| 5 | Erin Boley | 6–2 | F | Hodgenville, Kentucky | Elizabethtown High School | Notre Dame |
| 22 | Kaila Charles | 5–11 | F | Glenn Dale, Maryland | Riverdale Baptist School | Maryland |
| 8 | Natalie Chou | 6–1 | G | Plano, Texas | Plano West | Baylor |
| 35 | Lindsey Corsaro | 6–0 | G | Indianapolis, Indiana | Roncalli High School | Kentucky |
| 3 | Crystal Dangerfield | 5–6 | G | Murfreesboro, Tennessee | Blackman High School | Connecticut |
| 2 | Joyner Holmes | 6–3 | F | Cedar Hill, Texas | Cedar Hill High School | Texas |
| 13 | Cierra Johnson | 6–4 | C | Duncanville, Texas | Duncanville High School | Louisville |
| 19 | Nancy Mulkey | 6–9 | C | Cypress, Texas | Cypress Woods High School | Oklahoma |
| 12 | Amber Ramirez | 5–8 | G | San Antonio, Texas | Karen Wagner High School | TCU |
| 6 | Sug Sutton | 5–8 | G | St. Louis, Missouri | Parkway North High School | Texas |
| 29 | Blair Watson | 6–0 | F | Nutley, New Jersey | Nutley High School | Maryland |
| 30 | Aaliyah Wilson | 5–9 | G | Muskogee, Oklahoma | Muskogee High School | Arkansas |

=== 2016 West Roster ===
| ESPNW 100 Rank | Name | Height | Position | Hometown | High school | College choice |
|---|---|---|---|---|---|---|
| 41 | Jeannie Boehm | 6–3 | F | Winnetka, Illinois | New Trier High School | Harvard |
| 34 | DiJonai Carrington | 6–0 | G | San Diego, California | Horizon Christian Academy | Stanford |
| 45 | Chassity Carter | 5–11 | F | Dickson, Tennessee | Dickson County High School | Vanderbilt |
| 1 | Lauren Cox | 6–4 | F | Flower Mound, Texas | Flower Mound High School | Baylor |
| 27 | Nadia Fingall | 6–2 | C | Navarre, Florida | Choctawhatchee High School | Stanford |
| 4 | Sabrina Ionescu | 5–10 | G | Walnut Creek, California | Miramonte High School | Oregon |
| 10 | Tori McCoy | 6–4 | F | Champaign, Illinois | Saint Thomas More High School | Ohio State |
| 9 | Leaonna Odom | 6–1 | F | Lompoc, California | Chaminade College Preparatory School | Duke |
| 17 | Kylee Shook | 6–4 | C | Colorado Springs, Colorado | Mesa Ridge High School | Louisville |
| 7 | Destiny Slocum | 5–7 | G | Meridian, Idaho | Mountain View High School | Maryland |
| 42 | Anna Wilson | 5–7 | G | Seattle, Washington | Bellevue High School | Stanford |
| 11 | Jackie Young | 5–11 | G | Princeton, Indiana | Princeton Community High School | Notre Dame |

=== Coaches ===
The East team was coached by:

- Head Coach — Marcia Pinder of Dillard High School (Fort Lauderdale, Florida)

The West team was coached by:

- Head Coach - Jesse Nelson of Olpe High School (Emporia, Kansas)

== Game ==
ESPNU

March 30, 2016
06:00

| East | 88–97 | West |
Scoring by half: –, –
| Pts: Amber Ramirez 21; Rebs: Cierra Johnson 9 Asts: Crystal Dangerfield 6 | | Pts: Sabrina Ionescu 25; Rebs: Sabrina Ionescu; Jackie Young; Lauren Cox; Nadia Fingall 10; Asts: Destiny Slocum 5 |

United Center, Chicago, IL

== See also ==
2016 McDonald's All-American Boys Game
