= Jackie Young =

American basketball player (born 1997)

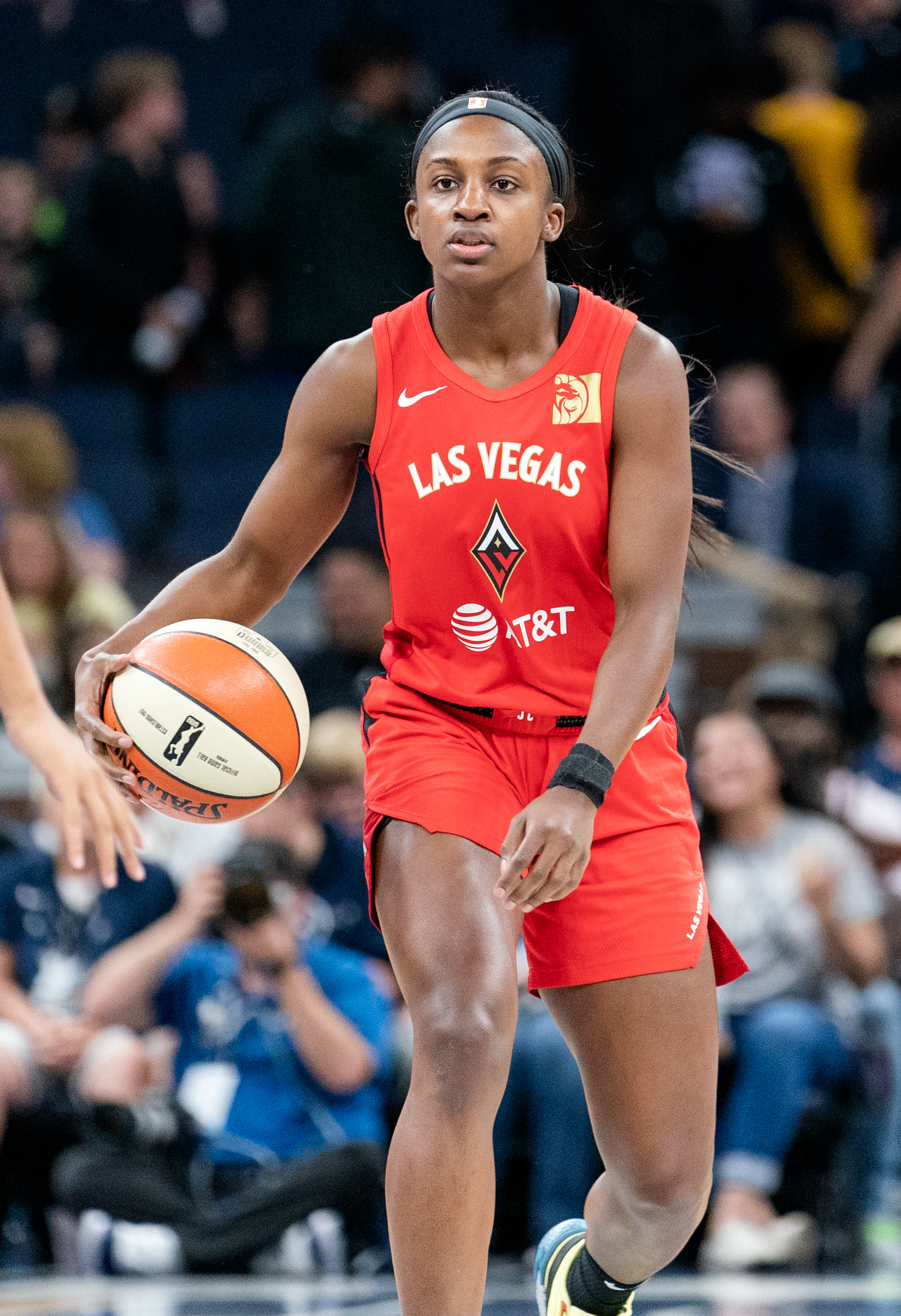
- Young with the Las Vegas Aces in 2019

No. 0 – Las Vegas Aces
- Position: Shooting guard
- League: WNBA

Personal information
- Born: September 16, 1997 (age 29) Princeton, Indiana, U.S.
- Listed height: 6 ft 0 in (1.83 m)
- Listed weight: 165 lb (75 kg)

Career information
- High school: Princeton Community (Princeton, Indiana)
- College: Notre Dame (2016–2019)
- WNBA draft: 2019: 1st round, 1st overall pick
- Drafted by: Las Vegas Aces
- Playing career: 2019–present

Career history
- 2019–present: Las Vegas Aces
- 2020: Elazığ İl Özel İdarespor
- 2020–2021: A.S. Ramat Hasharon
- 2021–2022: Perth Lynx
- 2025–present: Laces BC

Career highlights
- 3× WNBA champion (2022, 2023, 2025); WNBA Most Improved Player (2022); 5× WNBA All-Star (2022-2026); 3× All-WNBA Second Team (2023, 2025, 2026); All-WNBL First Team (2022); WNBA All-Rookie Team (2019); Commissioner’s Cup champion (2022); NCAA champion (2018); ACC tournament MVP (2019); Second-team All-ACC (2019); ACC All-Freshman Team (2017); Indiana Miss Basketball (2016); McDonald's All-American (2016); Naismith Prep Player of the Year (2016)
- Stats at WNBA.com
- Stats at Basketball Reference
Medals
Representing United States
Olympic Games
Women's 3x3 basketball
Gold medal – first place	2020 Tokyo	Team
Women's basketball
Gold medal – first place	2024 Paris	Team
FIBA World Cup
Gold medal – first place	2026 Germany

Jacquelyn Young (born September 16, 1997) is an American professional basketball player for the Las Vegas Aces of the Women's National Basketball Association (WNBA) and for the Laces of Unrivaled. She is the daughter of Linda Young and David Wayne Edwards Sr. She was drafted first overall by the Las Vegas Aces in the 2019 WNBA draft. A graduate of Princeton Community High School, she played college basketball for the Notre Dame Fighting Irish, reaching two NCAA finals and winning one in 2018. She won a gold medal in Women's 3x3 basketball at the 2020 Summer Olympics. In 2024, she won the gold medal in 5x5 basketball at the 2024 Summer Olympics. She has won three WNBA championships as a member of the Las Vegas Aces, and is a four-time WNBA All-Star.

== Early life ==
In Young's high school career, the PCHS Tigers posted a 97-9 (.915) record. She finished as the leading scorer (girls' or boys' basketball) in Indiana high school history with 3,268 points, eclipsing the 26-year-old record set by Damon Bailey. Overall, Young averaged 30.8 points, 10.3 rebounds, 5.5 assists and 3.5 steals per game, while shooting .583 from the field, .382 from beyond the arc and .858 from the free-throw line. She led Princeton to 53 consecutive wins and the 2015 Indiana Class 3A state championship. She scored 36 points in the state title game, setting the record for most points in a Class 3A final, as well as the most points by one player in any Indiana girls' basketball state title game since 1980. It is said that Young gets most of her athletic genes from her father who was a star high school basketball player as well as track athlete. Young also has a brother, David Wayne Edwards Jr., who was a defensive back for the national championship team of the University of Nebraska in 1997.

Young led her team to a 27–1 record in her senior season, ranking third in the state and ninth in the nation in scoring with 34.9 PPG. She also achieved 9.5 rebounds, 5.0 assists and 3.8 steals. She shot .605 as a senior with a .429 mark from three-point range and an .861 free-throw percentage. All told, she compiled 20 30-point games, 10 40-point games and a season high 53 points on Nov 20 vs. county rival Gibson Southern. She was the recipient of the 2016 Indiana Miss Basketball award.

Young set the Indiana high school girls' basketball single season scoring record as a junior, recording 1,003 points. She was the fifth player of either sex in state history to score 1,000 points in a season. She was ranked in the top-10 by nearly all major national recruiting services, including a No. 5 rank by Prospects Nation.

== College career ==
Young played three seasons of college basketball for the Notre Dame Fighting Irish between 2016 and 2019, where she won an NCAA championship as a sophomore in 2018. She earned ACC All-Freshman Team in 2017 and second-team All-ACC in 2019. She also earned ACC tournament MVP in 2019.

== Professional career ==
=== WNBA ===
Young had the option to remain at Notre Dame for the 2019–20 college season, but opted to enter the 2019 WNBA draft where she was selected with the first overall pick by the Las Vegas Aces, coached by Bill Laimbeer. She later signed a multi-year deal with Puma. She played the 2019 WNBA season as a point guard for the first time, having played as a shooting guard in college. Young finished eighth in the WNBA with 153 total assists, and her 2.89 assist/turnover ranked sixth overall. She averaged 6.6 points and 3.3 rebounds per game and was subsequently named to the WNBA All-Rookie Team.

In the 2020 WNBA season, Young averaged 10.1 points, 4.0 rebounds and 3.0 assist in 40 games with the Aces.

In the 2021 WNBA season, Young emerged as an early candidate for Most Improved Player after being shifted to that of a play finisher rather than a playmaker but eventually lost out to Brionna Jones as Dallas went out at the semi-final stage of the 2021 WNBA Playoffs. Following her further improvements during the 2022 season, she was selected as most improved player throughout the WNBA in 2022. She was also announced to her first WNBA All-Star team as a starter in July.

As of the end of the 2025 season, Young has won three WNBA championship championships as part of the Las Vegas Aces (2022, 2023, 2025), and has been a WNBA All-Star four times (2022–2025). In the 2025 Finals, she additionally set a WNBA record with the most points ever scored in a quarter in a Finals game, when she scored 21 points in the third quarter of game two, as well as tying her playoff career high with 32 points.

=== Turkey and Israel ===
In February 2020, Young joined Turkish side Elazığ, but her time there lasted only two games due to the coronavirus-induced cancellation of the league. In the 2020–21 season, Young played in Israel for A.S. Ramat Hasharon from Israeli League.

=== Australia ===
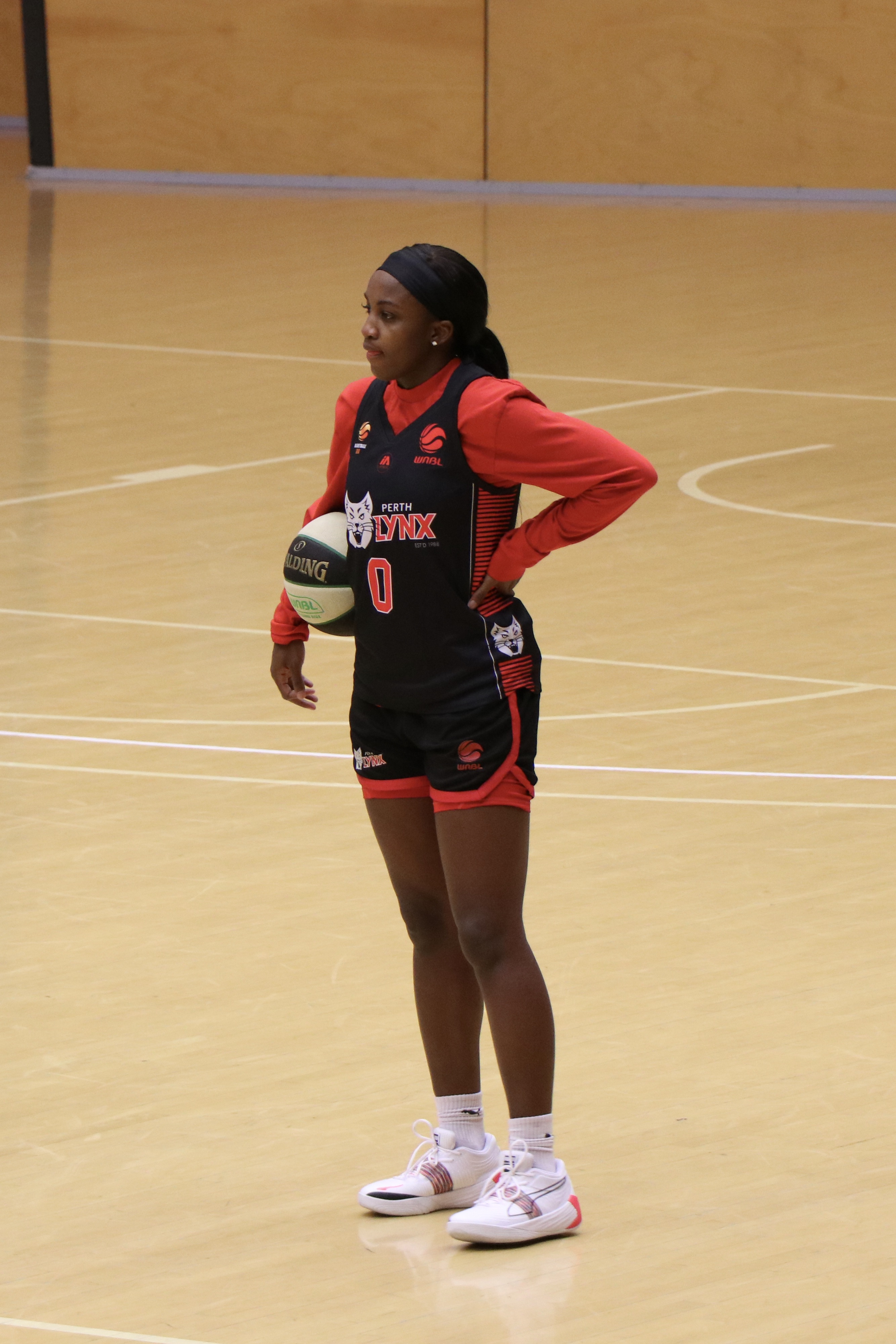
Young with the Perth Lynx in December 2021

On August 3, 2021, Young signed with the Perth Lynx in Australia for the 2021–22 WNBL season. Her performances grew steadily and in particular her scoring improved from an average of 10 points per game in the first ten games to average over twenty five in her subsequent six games including 30, 36 and 26 points in consecutive matches to help Lynx finish the regular season second in the WNBL. Jackie contributed 21, 12 and 18 respectively in the three-match final series which Melbourne Boomers won by two matches to one. Young was made 2021–22 season MVP for Perth Lynx and was runner-up overall league MVP.

=== Unrivaled ===
On July 18, 2024, it was announced that Young would appear and play in the inaugural season of Unrivaled, a new women's 3-on-3 basketball league founded by Napheesa Collier and Breanna Stewart. She plays for the Laces.

== National team career ==
=== 2020 Summer Olympics ===
In late March 2020, the International Olympic Committee (IOC) and the Tokyo Metropolitan Government postponed the 2020 Summer Olympics until the summer of 2021 due to the COVID-19 pandemic. In July 2021, Young won a gold medal in Women's 3x3 basketball at the 2020 Summer Olympics.

=== 2024 Summer Olympics ===
In June 2024, Young named to the USA Olympic team to compete at the 2024 Summer Olympics in France alongside fellow Aces teammates, Chelsea Gray, Kelsey Plum, and A'ja Wilson. Young and the United States defeated France 67–66 in the final, earning Young her first 5x5 gold medal and the United States’ eighth consecutive gold medal.

== Career statistics ==
Legend
GP	Games played	GS	Games started	MPG	Minutes per game	RPG	Rebounds per game
APG	Assists per game	SPG	Steals per game	BPG	Blocks per game	PPG	Points per game
TO	Turnovers per game	FG%	Field-goal percentage	3P%	3-point field-goal percentage	FT%	Free-throw percentage
**Bold**	Career best	°	League leader

=== WNBA ===
†	Denotes seasons in which Young won a WNBA championship
*	Denotes season(s) in which Young won an NCAA Championship

==== Regular season ====
WNBA regular season statistics
Year	Team	GP	GS	MPG	FG%	3P%	FT%	RPG	APG	SPG	BPG	TO	PPG
2019	Las Vegas	34	34	22.6	.322	.318	.808	3.3	4.5	.8	**.4**	1.6	6.6
2020	Las Vegas	22	0	25.8	.492	.231	.852	4.3	3.0	.7	.1	1.6	11.0
2021	Las Vegas	32	32	31.8	.507	.250	.833	4.1	3.2	1.1	.3	1.5	12.2
2022^{†}	Las Vegas	34	34	**33.2**	.476	.431	.859	4.4	3.9	**1.4**	.2	**1.3**	15.9
2023^{†}	Las Vegas	40	40	31.5	**.523**	**.449**	.867	4.0	3.8	1.3	.1	1.8	17.6
2024	Las Vegas	37	37	32.6	.430	.337	.867	4.4	5.3	1.0	.2	2.1	15.8
2025^{†}	Las Vegas	**44**	**44**	30.4	.475	.359	.894	**4.5**	5.1	1.3	**.4**	2.2	16.5
2026	Las Vegas	43	43	32.3	.488	.383	**.928**	4.4	**6.8**	.9	.3	2.4	**18.9**
**Career**	8 years, 1 team	286	264	30.3	.471	.380	.870	4.2	4.6	1.1	.3	1.8	14.8
**Career**	All-Star	5	3	12.1	.192	.200	—	1.0	1.8	.0	.0	.6	2.6

==== Playoffs ====
WNBA playoff statistics
Year	Team	GP	GS	MPG	FG%	3P%	FT%	RPG	APG	SPG	BPG	TO	PPG
2019	Las Vegas	5	5	12.4	.409	**.800**	.875	1.8	2.6	.0	.0	1.2	5.8
2020	Las Vegas	8	0	20.4	.309	.167	.905	3.0	2.8	.3	.1	2.4	7.8
2021	Las Vegas	5	5	26.0	.333	.000	**1.000**	3.2	2.2	1.0	**.4**	**.6**	5.6
2022^{†}	Las Vegas	10	10	34.5	.432	.474	.926	4.1	3.0	.8	.1	1.6	12.5
2023^{†}	Las Vegas	9	9	34.8	.421	.415	.914	5.6	5.0	1.6	.1	1.2	16.7
2024	Las Vegas	6	6	30.5	.375	.359	.818	**5.8**	3.0	.8	.3	1.2	13.8
2025^{†}	Las Vegas	**12**	**12**	34.8	**.494**	.309	.945	4.8	5.5	1.4	.0	2.5	**20.4**
2026	Las Vegas	6	6	**37.8**	.381	.421	.943	3.5	**6.2**	**1.7**	.0	2.8	18.8
**Career**	8 years, 1 team	61	53	30.2	.415	.387	.924	4.2	4.0	1.0	.1	1.8	13.7

=== Women's Basketball Super League ===
Figures are average per game
Year/League	Team	GP	MPG	PPG	FG%	3P%	FT%	RO	RD	RT	APG	PF	BPG	SPG	TO	RNK
Turkish League 2020	Elazig	2	20.5	4.5	.286	.000	.500	1.5	2.0	3.5	2.5	2.0	.0	2.0	3.0	1.0

=== WNBL (Australia) ===
Year	Team	G	PTS	FGA	FGM	FG%	3PA	3PM	3P%	FTA	FTM	FT&	DEF	OFF	REB	AST	BLK	STL	TO
2022	Perth Lynx	20	356	293	140	.478	15	3	.200	87	73	.839	61	20	81	66	4	30	32

=== College ===
NCAA statistics
Year	Team	GP	GS	MPG	FG%	3P%	FT%	RPG	APG	SPG	BPG	TO	PPG
2016–17	Notre Dame	33	0	21.4	.463	.379	**.803**	4.6	1.4	**1.8**	.3	**1.5**	7.3
2017–18*	Notre Dame	**38**	**38**	**34.4**	.520	.282	.789	6.6	3.7	1.4	**.5**	2.4	14.5
2018–19	Notre Dame	**38**	37	32.2	**.528**	**.452**	.785	**7.4**	**5.1**	1.3	.4	1.9	**14.7**
**Career**		109	75	29.7	.512	.364	.790	6.3	3.5	1.2	.4	1.9	12.4

== See also ==
- List of WNBA career free throw percentage leaders
- List of WNBA post-season records
