= Chelsea Gray =

American basketball player (born 1992)

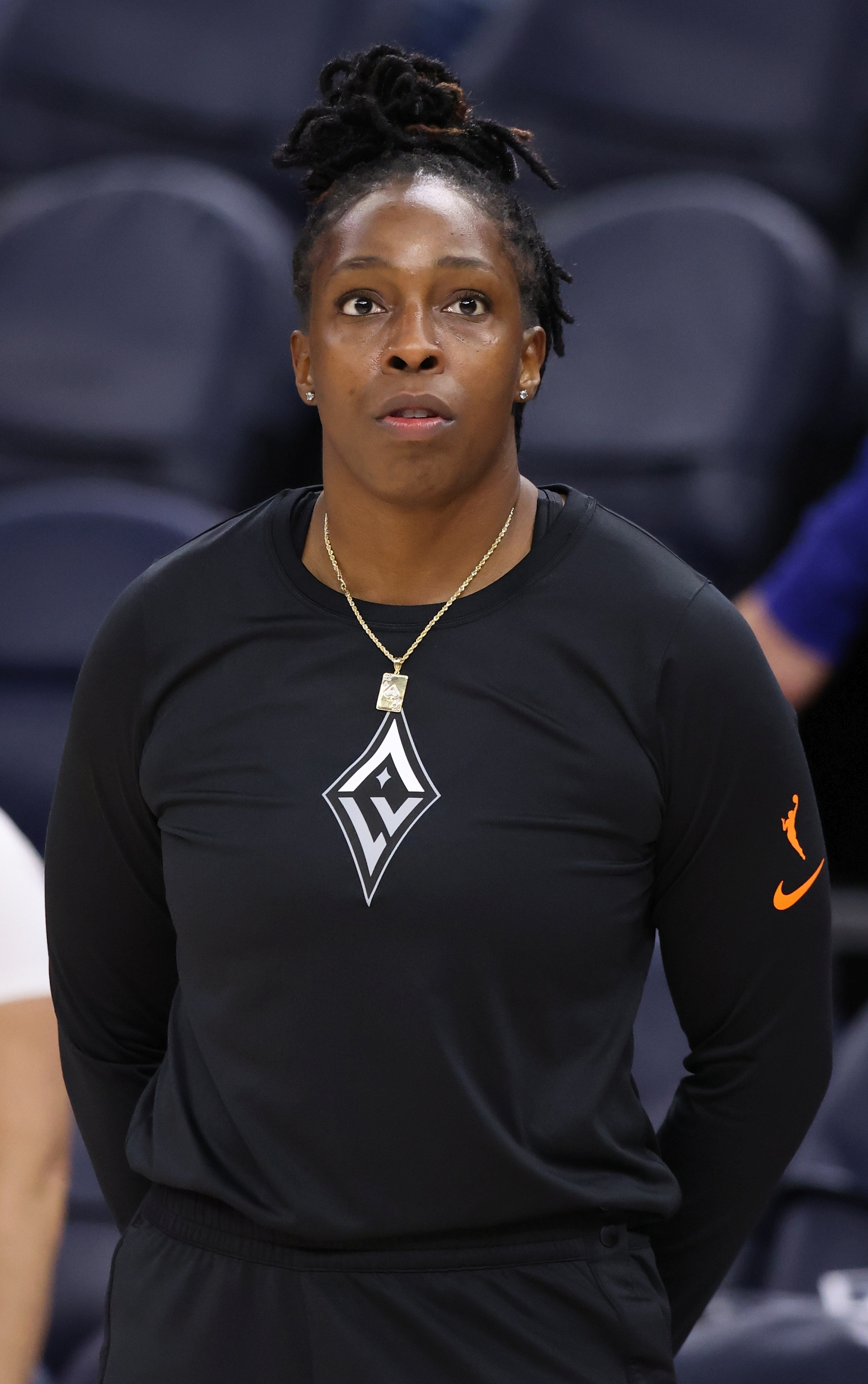
- Gray with the Las Vegas Aces in 2024

No. 12 – Las Vegas Aces
- Position: Point guard
- League: WNBA

Personal information
- Born: October 8, 1992 (age 34) Hayward, California, U.S.
- Listed height: 5 ft 11 in (1.80 m)
- Listed weight: 170 lb (77 kg)

Career information
- High school: St. Mary's (Stockton, California)
- College: Duke (2010–2014)
- WNBA draft: 2014: 1st round, 11th overall pick
- Drafted by: Connecticut Sun
- Playing career: 2014–present

Career history
- 2015: Connecticut Sun
- 2015: Hapoel Rishon LeZion
- 2015: Uni Girona
- 2015–2017: Abdullah Gül Üniversitesi
- 2016–2020: Los Angeles Sparks
- 2017–2018: Botaş SK
- 2019: Çukurova Basketbol
- 2020: Fenerbahçe
- 2020–2021: Uni Girona
- 2021–present: Las Vegas Aces
- 2025–present: Rose BC

Career highlights
- 4× WNBA champion (2016, 2022, 2023, 2025); WNBA Finals MVP (2022); 6× WNBA All-Star (2017–2019, 2021, 2023, 2024); All-WNBA First Team (2019); 2× All-WNBA Second Team (2017, 2023); Commissioner's Cup champion (2022); Commissioner's Cup MVP (2022); WNBA Skills Challenge Champion (2023); Unrivaled champion (2025); Unrivaled Finals MVP (2025); Unrivaled MVP (2026); Unrivaled First-team all-Unrivaled (2025); Turkish Women's Basketball Cup champion (2020); WBCA Coaches' All-American (2013); Second-team All-American – AP (2013); ACC Player of the Year (2013); ACC All-Defensive Team (2013); 2× First-team All-ACC (2012, 2013); ACC All-Freshman Team (2011); McDonald's All-American (2010); California Miss Basketball (2010)
- Stats at WNBA.com
- Stats at Basketball Reference
Medals
Women's basketball
Representing the United States
Olympic Games
Gold medal – first place	2020 Tokyo	Team
Gold medal – first place	2024 Paris	Team
World Cup
Gold medal – first place	2022 Australia
Gold medal – first place	2026 Germany

Chelsea Nicelle Gray (born October 8, 1992) is an American professional basketball player for the Las Vegas Aces of the Women's National Basketball Association (WNBA) and for Rose of Unrivaled. Nicknamed "Point Gawd", she was the eleventh pick in the 2014 WNBA draft by the Connecticut Sun. After missing the 2014 season due to injury, she made her debut in the following year. Gray won her first title with the Los Angeles Sparks in 2016. She won her second title with the Las Vegas Aces in the 2022 WNBA Finals, where she was named Finals MVP, and she won her third and fourth title with Las Vegas Aces in 2023 and 2025. She won gold medals for 5x5 basketball at the 2020 and 2024 Summer Olympics. Her team, Rose BC, won the first ever Unrivaled league championship, where Gray was team captain and Finals MVP.

== College career ==
Joanne P. McCallie coached Duke's women's basketball team during the time Gray played for the Duke Blue Devils. In Gray's junior year at Duke (February 2013), she dislocated her knee which caused her to be sidelined the rest of her junior year. Gray injured the same knee again in January 2014, causing her to miss the remainder of her senior year and abruptly ending her college career. Despite this she was drafted to the Connecticut Sun in 2014.

== Professional career ==
=== WNBA ===
==== Connecticut Sun (2015) ====
Chelsea was drafted 11th overall by the Connecticut Sun in the 2014 WNBA draft. She sat out the 2014 season while recovering from a right knee injury that she sustained in January of her senior year while playing at Duke.

Chelsea would come back healthy in time for the 2015 season. Coming off the bench for the Sun, she averaged 6.9 ppg.

==== Los Angeles Sparks (2016–2020) ====
Prior to the 2016 season, Gray was traded to the Los Angeles Sparks along with two first round picks in the 2016 WNBA draft and a first round pick in the 2017 WNBA draft in exchange for draft rights to Jonquel Jones and the 17th pick in the 2016 WNBA Draft. Joining forces with Candace Parker, Kristi Toliver and Nneka Ogwumike, Gray would come off the bench as the back-up point guard on the Sparks roster, playing 33 games with 1 start and averaging 5.9 ppg. The Sparks were a championship contender in the league, finishing 26–8. The Sparks were the number 2 seed in the league with a double-bye to the semi-finals (the last round before the WNBA Finals) facing the Chicago Sky due to the WNBA's new playoff format. The Sparks defeated the Sky 3–1 in the series, advancing to the WNBA Finals for the first time since 2003. In the Finals, the Sparks were up against the championship-defending Minnesota Lynx. Gray's playing time would be slightly increased in the Finals and was able to provide an offensive spark off the bench for the Sparks. In Game 4 with the Sparks up 2–1, Gray scored a team-high 20 points off the bench in 24 minutes of play, but the Sparks still lost the game. In the decisive Game 5, Gray scored 11 consecutive points for the Sparks in the second half. The Sparks would win Game 5 and the 2016 WNBA Championship.

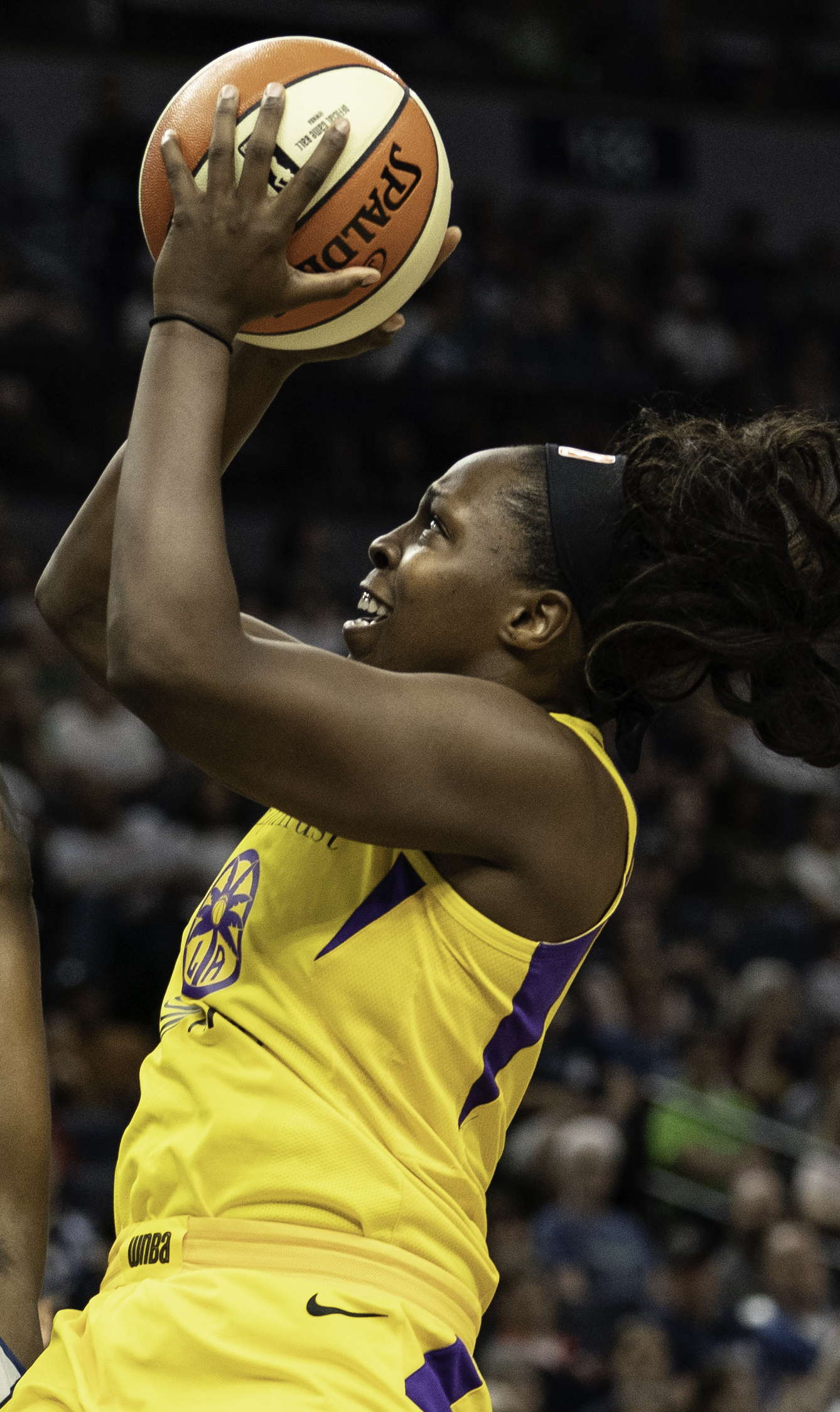
Gray shooting in 2019

With Toliver leaving the Sparks in free agency to join the Washington Mystics, Gray would be moved to starting point guard, following her heroic off-the-bench performance in the Finals. Gray would have a breakout season in 2017 as she scored a career-high 25 points on May 27, 2017, in a 75–73 loss to the Atlanta Dream. Gray would also be voted into the 2017 WNBA All-Star Game, making it her first career all-star game appearance. She finished off the season leading the league in three-point field goal percentage and averaged career-highs in scoring, rebounds, assists and minutes as the Sparks finished second place in the league with a 26–8 record, receiving a double-bye to the semi-finals. The Sparks would go on to advance to the Finals for the second season in a row, after defeating the Phoenix Mercury in a 3-game sweep, setting up a rematch with the Lynx. In Game 1 of the 2017 WNBA Finals, Gray scored a new career-high 27 points and hit the game-winning shot with 2 seconds left, sealing an 85–84 victory to give the Sparks a 1–0 series lead. However, the Sparks would lose in five games, failing to win back-to-back championships.

On May 20, 2018, in the Sparks' season opener against the Lynx, Gray scored 18 points along with a game-winning layup at the buzzer in a 77–76 victory. Later on in the season, Gray would be voted into the 2018 WNBA All-Star Game, for her second career all-star appearance. Gray finished off the season averaging a new career-highs in scoring, steals, assists and rebounds. The Sparks finished as the number 6 seed in the league with a 19–15 record. In the first round elimination game they would defeat the Lynx 75–68 in which Gray Gray scored a season-high 26 points. The Sparks would advance to the second round elimination game where they would lose 96–64 to the Washington Mystics.

On April 30, 2019, Gray re-signed with the Sparks. On July 7, 2019, Gray recorded her first triple-double with 13 points, 13 assists, and 10 rebounds in a 98–81 win against the Washington Mystics, becoming both the ninth player in league history and the third player in Sparks' franchise history to record a triple-double. Gray would also be voted into the 2019 WNBA All-Star Game, making it her third all-star appearance. On August 29, 2019, Gray scored a career-high 30 points in a 87–83 win against the Indiana Fever. By the end of the season, the Sparks finished as the number 3 seed with a 22–12 record, receiving a bye to the second round. In the second round elimination game, the Sparks defeated the defending champions Seattle Storm 92–69. In the semi-finals, the Sparks were defeated in a three-game sweep by the Connecticut Sun.

In the 2020 WNBA season, Gray started all 22 games played for the Sparks, the season was shortened in a bubble at IMG Academy due to the COVID-19 pandemic. On August 28, 2020, Gray scored a season-high 27 points in an 80–76 victory over the Connecticut Sun. The Sparks finished 15–7 with the number 3 seed, receiving a bye to the second round but were eliminated by the seventh seeded Connecticut Sun in the second round elimination game, making it the second year a row that they've been eliminated by the same team.

==== Las Vegas Aces (2021–present) ====
In 2021 free agency, Gray signed a multi-year deal with the Las Vegas Aces.

=== Overseas ===
Before her first WNBA season, Gray played in Israeli League for Hapoel Rishon Le-Zion in the 2014–15 off-season. In the 2015–16 off-season, Gray played in Spain for Uni Girona CB for the first portion of the off-season and spent the second portion of the off-season playing in Turkey for Abdullah Gul University. In June 2016, Gray re-signed with Abdullah Gul University for the 2016–17 off-season. In July 2017, Gray signed with Botaş SK for the 2017–18 off-season. In July 2020, Gray signed with Fenerbahçe of the Turkish league.

=== Unrivaled ===
On July 11, 2024, it was announced that Gray would appear and play in the inaugural season of Unrivaled, a new women's 3-on-3 basketball league founded by Napheesa Collier and Breanna Stewart. She captained Rose BC, the winners of the first ever Unrivaled Championship, in which she was awarded the Finals MVP Trophy.

== National team career ==
=== 2020 Summer Olympics ===
In late March 2020, the International Olympic Committee (IOC) and the Tokyo Metropolitan Government postponed the 2020 Summer Olympics until the summer of 2021 due to the COVID-19 pandemic. In June 2021, Gray was named to the 12-player roster for Team USA for the 2020 summer Olympics. She and Team USA went on to win the gold medal in the tournament, defeating Japan 90–75 in the final.

=== 2024 Summer Olympics ===
In June 2024, Gray was again named to the US women's Olympic team to compete at the 2024 Summer Olympics in France, alongside fellow Aces teammates, Kelsey Plum, A'ja Wilson, and Jackie Young. Gray and the United States defeated France 67–66 in the final, earning Gray her second consecutive gold medal and the United States' eighth consecutive gold medal.

== Career statistics ==
Legend
GP	Games played	GS	Games started	MPG	Minutes per game	RPG	Rebounds per game
APG	Assists per game	SPG	Steals per game	BPG	Blocks per game	PPG	Points per game
TO	Turnovers per game	FG%	Field-goal percentage	3P%	3-point field-goal percentage	FT%	Free-throw percentage
**Bold**	Career best	°	League leader

	Denotes seasons in which Gray won a Turkish Women's Basketball Cup
†	Denotes seasons in which Gray won a WNBA championship

=== WNBA ===
==== Regular season ====
WNBA regular season statistics
Year	Team	GP	GS	MPG	FG%	3P%	FT%	RPG	APG	SPG	BPG	TO	PPG
2014	Did not play (injury)												
2015	Connecticut	34	0	16.0	.424	.348	.816	2.3	2.7	.6	.1	1.7	6.9
2016^{†}	Los Angeles	33	1	16.4	.452	.304	.780	1.8	2.8	.4	.1	**1.2**	5.9
2017	Los Angeles	34	34	**33.1**	**.507**	**.482**°	.827	3.3	4.4	1.0	.2	1.9	14.8
2018	Los Angeles	34	34	32.7	.484	.392	.835	3.4	5.1	1.4	.2	2.3	14.9
2019	Los Angeles	34	34	32.6	.416	.382	.917	3.8	5.9	1.0	.1	3.1	14.5
2020	Los Angeles	22	22	30.6	.442	.305	.**939**	3.7	5.3	**1.6**	.1	2.7	14.0
2021	Las Vegas	32	32	28.9	.454	.380	.889	2.9	5.9	1.2	.3	2.8	11.1
2022^{†}	Las Vegas	35	35	29.7	.491	.340	.910	3.2	6.1	**1.6**	.3	2.3	13.7
2023^{†}	Las Vegas	40	40	32.2	.490	.421	.897	**4.0**	**7.3**	1.4	.6	2.5	**15.3**
2024	Las Vegas	27	25	26.0	.408	.338	.813	2.9	4.9	1.3	**.7**	2.4	8.6
2025^{†}	Las Vegas	**44**	**44**	31.1	.439	.368	.885	3.9	5.4	1.4	.6	2.8	11.2
2026	Las Vegas	43	43	32.7	.441	.365	.930	3.3	6.7	1.4	.3	2.8	12.0
**Career**	12 years, 3 teams	412	344	28.7	.457	.377	.872	3.2	5.2	1.2	.3	2.4	12.0
**Career**	All-Star	6	4	18.1	.405	.292	—	3.5	5.2	.3	.0	1.7	6.8

==== Playoffs ====
WNBA playoff statistics
Year	Team	GP	GS	MPG	FG%	3P%	FT%	RPG	APG	SPG	BPG	TO	PPG
2016^{†}	Los Angeles	9	0	22.1	.406	.391	.833	1.7	2.8	1.1	.0	2.4	9.0
2017	Los Angeles	8	8	35.6	.461	.333	.778	3.4	6.8	1.3	.2	2.7	15.1
2018	Los Angeles	2	2	31.7	.393	.429	.833	4.0	4.5	.0	.5	2.0	16.5
2019	Los Angeles	4	4	32.4	.367	.333	.667	3.0	5.3	1.2	.2	2.7	10.5
2020	Los Angeles	1	1	35.0	.222	.000	—	2.0	.0	1.0	.0	3.0	4.0
2021	Las Vegas	5	5	28.4	.462	.389	**1.000**°	3.2	6.4	1.0	.0	**1.2**	15.4
2022^{†}	Las Vegas	10	10	34.0	**.611**	**.544**	.833	3.8	7.0	1.2	.6	3.0	**21.7**
2023^{†}	Las Vegas	8	8	35.9	.436	.355	**1.000**°	**4.8**	6.8	1.5	1.0	3.0	15.6
2024	Las Vegas	6	6	32.0	.383	.286	.818	2.7	6.2	.7	1.0	2.8	10.5
2025^{†}	Las Vegas	**12**	**12**	35.4	.425	.422	.760	3.4	**7.3**	**2.3**	**1.3**	2.2	11.2
2026	Las Vegas	6	6	**38.3**	.453	.393	.909	3.7	5.7	1.2	.2	4.0	16.5
**Career**	11 years, 2 teams	71	62	32.8	.458	.398	.852	3.3	6.0	1.3	.6	2.7	14.0

=== Overseas ===
==== National competition ====
===== Regular season =====
Season	Team	League	GP	MPG	FG%	3P%	FT%	RPG	APG	SPG	BPG	TO	PPG
2014–15	Hapoel Rishon LeZion	(Israel) Ligat ha'Al	14	35.4	.500	.351	.812	6.4	5.9	2.8	.1	4.0	20.6
2015–16	Spar Citylift Girona	(Spain) LFB	9	32.4	.477	.400	.889	4.8	4.4	4.0	.2	4.4	18.4
2015–16	Abdullah Gül Üniversitesi	(Turkey) KBSL	20	30.6	.541	.246	.846	3.8	4.7	1.6	.1	3.2	13.6
2016–17	Abdullah Gül Üniversitesi	(Turkey) KBSL	24	33.0	.556	.364	.805	4.0	5.1	1.5	.1	2.6	14.9
2017–18	Botaş	(Turkey) KBSL	18	33.0	.518	.211	.805	4.9	6.6	1.7	.0	3.3	16.4
2018–19	Çukurova	(Turkey) KBSL	11	25.3	.610	.324	.944	3.3	7.2	1.3	.1	2.0	13.6
2019–20	Fenerbahçe	(Turkey) KBSL	3	18.1	.444	.444	1.000	2.3	6.0	1.0	.0	1.7	7.3
2020–21	Spar Girona	(Spain) LFB	22	24.4	.514	.162	.841	3.5	3.6	1.0	.0	2.0	10.6

===== Playoffs =====
Season	Team	League	GP	MPG	FG%	3P%	FT%	RPG	APG	SPG	BPG	TO	PPG
2015–16	Abdullah Gül Üniversitesi	(Turkey) KBSL	7	**39.6**	.446	.258	.773	3.6	5.0	1.7	.0	2.7	16.4
2016–17	Abdullah Gül Üniversitesi	(Turkey) KBSL	3	33.4	.482	.143	**1.000**	2.3	3.3	2.0	**1.0**	**2.0**	11.3
2017–18	Botaş	(Turkey) KBSL	2	35.2	.375	.000	**1.000**	**5.5**	**7.5**	1.5	.0	5.5	14.5
2018–19	Çukurova	(Turkey) KBSL	**10**	34.1	.538	**.400**	.909	5.2	6.9	1.4	.1	2.3	**19.4**
2020–21	Spar Girona	(Spain) LFB	4	29.4	**.563**	.167	**1.000**	2.5	3.5	**2.8**	.0	3.0	12.8

=== College ===
NCAA statistics
Year	Team	GP	GS	MPG	FG%	3P%	FT%	RPG	APG	SPG	BPG	TO	PPG
2010–11	Duke	**34**	18	21.2	.432	.398	.805	3.3	2.5	1.9	.2	**1.8**	8.7
2011–12	Duke	33	**33**	**32.2**	.458	.377	.821	4.9	6.1	2.8	**.4**	3.5	12.5
2012–13	Duke	25	25	30.3	.421	**.407**	**.851**	**5.3**	5.4	**3.6**	.1	2.6	**12.6**
2013–14	Duke	17	16	27.7	**.504**	.333	.745	4.2	**7.2**	2.9	.2	3.2	10.8
**Career**		109	92	27.7	.449	.385	.814	4.4	5.0	2.7	.2	2.7	11.1

== Personal life ==
Gray has participated in Amateur Athletic Union (AAU). In her free time, she has helped work out and train younger kids in AAU to become better athletes.

She is openly lesbian. In November 2019, she married former Long Beach State and American Samoan basketball player, Tipesa Moorer. In November 2023, they announced that Tipesa was pregnant with their first child, and in February 2024, Lennox Ali'i Gray was born.

== See also ==
- List of WNBA career assists leaders
- List of WNBA career free throw percentage leaders
- List of WNBA career scoring leaders
- List of WNBA career turnovers leaders
