= All-WNBA Team =

Annual selection of best players in the league

The All-WNBA Team is an annual Women's National Basketball Association (WNBA) honor bestowed on the best players in the league following every season. The voting is conducted by a panel of sportswriters and broadcasters throughout the United States. The team has been selected in every season of the league's existence, dating back to its inaugural season in 1997. The All-WNBA Team is composed of two five-woman lineups—a first and second team, comprising a total of 10 roster spots.

Through the 2021 season, all teams consisted of a center, two forwards, and two guards. On August 5, 2022, the league announced that future All-WNBA Teams would be selected without regard to player position.

Players receive five points for a first-team vote and three points for a second-team vote. As of the 2022 season, the top five players with the highest point total make the first team, with the next five making the second team.

Diana Taurasi holds the record for the most total selections with fourteen. Taurasi holds the record for the most First Team selections with ten, while Leslie follows with eight.

== Selections ==
	Denotes players who are still active in the WNBA
	Elected to the Naismith Memorial Basketball Hall of Fame
Player (X)	Denotes the number of times the player has been selected
**Player** **(in bold text)**	Indicates the player who won the WNBA Most Valuable Player in the same year^{[a]}

=== 1997 to present ===
Season	First team			Second team		
Season	Player	Nationality	Team	Player	Nationality	Team
1997	**Cynthia Cooper**	United States	Houston Comets	Teresa Weatherspoon	United States	New York Liberty
1997	Ruthie Bolton-Holifield	United States	Sacramento Monarchs	Andrea Stinson	United States	Charlotte Sting
1997	Eva Němcová	Czech Republic	Cleveland Rockers	Wendy Palmer	United States	Utah Starzz
1997	Tina Thompson	United States	Houston Comets	Jennifer Gillom	United States	Phoenix Mercury
1997	Lisa Leslie	United States	Los Angeles Sparks	Rebecca Lobo	United States	New York Liberty
1998	**Cynthia Cooper** (2)	United States	Houston Comets	Teresa Weatherspoon (2)	United States	New York Liberty
1998	Suzie McConnell Serio	United States	Cleveland Rockers	Andrea Stinson (2)	United States	Charlotte Sting
1998	Sheryl Swoopes	United States	Houston Comets	Eva Němcová (2)	Czech Republic	Cleveland Rockers
1998	Tina Thompson (2)	United States	Houston Comets	Cindy Brown	United States	Detroit Shock
1998	Jennifer Gillom (2)	United States	Phoenix Mercury	Lisa Leslie (2)	United States	Los Angeles Sparks
1999	Cynthia Cooper (3)	United States	Houston Comets	Shannon Johnson	United States	Orlando Miracle
1999	Ticha Penicheiro	Portugal	Sacramento Monarchs	Teresa Weatherspoon (3)	United States	New York Liberty
1999	Sheryl Swoopes (2)	United States	Houston Comets	Chamique Holdsclaw	United States	Washington Mystics
1999	Natalie Williams	United States	Utah Starzz	Tina Thompson (3)	United States	Houston Comets
1999	**Yolanda Griffith**	United States	Sacramento Monarchs	Lisa Leslie (3)	United States	Los Angeles Sparks
2000	Cynthia Cooper (4)	United States	Houston Comets	Shannon Johnson (2)	United States	Orlando Miracle
2000	Ticha Penicheiro (2)	Portugal	Sacramento Monarchs	Katie Smith	United States	Minnesota Lynx
2000	**Sheryl Swoopes** (3)	United States	Houston Comets	Betty Lennox	United States	Minnesota Lynx
2000	Natalie Williams (2)	United States	Utah Starzz	Teresa Weatherspoon (4)	United States	New York Liberty
2000	Lisa Leslie (4)	United States	Los Angeles Sparks	Tina Thompson (4)	United States	Houston Comets
2000				Yolanda Griffith (2)	United States	Sacramento Monarchs
2001	Janeth Arcain	Brazil	Houston Comets	Ticha Penicheiro (3)	Portugal	Sacramento Monarchs
2001	Katie Smith (2)	United States	Minnesota Lynx	Tamecka Dixon	United States	Los Angeles Sparks
2001	Merlakia Jones	United States	Cleveland Rockers	Chamique Holdsclaw (2)	United States	Washington Mystics
2001	Natalie Williams (3)	United States	Utah Starzz	Tina Thompson (5)	United States	Houston Comets
2001	**Lisa Leslie** (5)	United States	Los Angeles Sparks	Yolanda Griffith (3)	United States	Sacramento Monarchs
2002	Sue Bird	United States	Seattle Storm	Shannon Johnson (3)	United States	Orlando Miracle
2002	**Sheryl Swoopes** (4)	United States	Houston Comets	Katie Smith (3)	United States	Minnesota Lynx
2002	Mwadi Mabika	(Democratic Republic of the Congo) DR Congo	Los Angeles Sparks	Chamique Holdsclaw (3)	United States	Washington Mystics
2002	Tamika Catchings	United States	Indiana Fever	Tina Thompson (6)	United States	Houston Comets
2002	Lisa Leslie (6)	United States	Los Angeles Sparks	Tari Phillips	United States	New York Liberty
2003	Sue Bird (2)	United States	Seattle Storm	Nikki Teasley	United States	Los Angeles Sparks
2003	Katie Smith (4)	United States	Minnesota Lynx	Deanna Nolan	United States	Detroit Shock
2003	Tamika Catchings (2)	United States	Indiana Fever	Sheryl Swoopes (5)	United States	Houston Comets
2003	**Lauren Jackson**	Australia	Seattle Storm	Swin Cash	United States	Detroit Shock
2003	Lisa Leslie (7)	United States	Los Angeles Sparks	Cheryl Ford	United States	Detroit Shock
2004	Sue Bird (3)	United States	Seattle Storm	Nikki Teasley (2)	United States	Los Angeles Sparks
2004	Diana Taurasi	United States	Phoenix Mercury	Nykesha Sales	United States	Connecticut Sun
2004	Tina Thompson (7)	United States	Houston Comets	Tamika Catchings (3)	United States	Indiana Fever
2004	Lauren Jackson (2)	Australia	Seattle Storm	Swin Cash (2)	United States	Detroit Shock
2004	**Lisa Leslie** (8)	United States	Los Angeles Sparks	Yolanda Griffith (4)	United States	Sacramento Monarchs
2005	Sue Bird (4)	United States	Seattle Storm	Diana Taurasi (2)	United States	Phoenix Mercury
2005	Deanna Nolan (2)	United States	Detroit Shock	Becky Hammon	United States	New York Liberty
2005	**Sheryl Swoopes** (6)	United States	Houston Comets	Tamika Catchings (4)	United States	Indiana Fever
2005	Lauren Jackson (3)	Australia	Seattle Storm	Taj McWilliams-Franklin	United States	Connecticut Sun
2005	Yolanda Griffith (5)	United States	Sacramento Monarchs	Lisa Leslie (9)	United States	Los Angeles Sparks
2006	Diana Taurasi (3)	United States	Phoenix Mercury	Seimone Augustus	United States	Minnesota Lynx
2006	Katie Douglas	United States	Connecticut Sun	Sheryl Swoopes (7)	United States	Houston Comets
2006	Tamika Catchings (5)	United States	Indiana Fever	Alana Beard	United States	Washington Mystics
2006	Lauren Jackson (4)	Australia	Seattle Storm	Cheryl Ford (2)	United States	Detroit Shock
2006	**Lisa Leslie** (10)	United States	Los Angeles Sparks	Taj McWilliams-Franklin (2)	United States	Connecticut Sun
2007	Diana Taurasi (4)	United States	Phoenix Mercury	Katie Douglas (2)	United States	Connecticut Sun
2007	Becky Hammon (2)	United States	San Antonio Silver Stars	Seimone Augustus (2)	United States	Minnesota Lynx
2007	Deanna Nolan (3)	United States	Detroit Shock	Sophia Young	(Saint Vincent and the Grenadines) St. Vincent	San Antonio Silver Stars
2007	Penny Taylor	Australia	Phoenix Mercury	Tamika Catchings (6)	United States	Indiana Fever
2007	**Lauren Jackson** (5)	Australia	Seattle Storm	Tina Thompson (8)	United States	Houston Comets
2008	Diana Taurasi (5)	United States	Phoenix Mercury	Sue Bird (5)	United States	Seattle Storm
2008	Lindsay Whalen	United States	Connecticut Sun	Becky Hammon (3)	United States	San Antonio Silver Stars
2008	Sophia Young (2)	(Saint Vincent and the Grenadines) St. Vincent	San Antonio Silver Stars	Deanna Nolan (4)	United States	Detroit Shock
2008	**Candace Parker**	United States	Los Angeles Sparks	Asjha Jones	United States	Connecticut Sun
2008	Lisa Leslie (11)	United States	Los Angeles Sparks	Lauren Jackson (6)	Australia	Seattle Storm
2009	**Diana Taurasi** (6)	United States	Phoenix Mercury	Katie Douglas (3)	United States	Indiana Fever
2009	Becky Hammon (4)	United States	San Antonio Silver Stars	Deanna Nolan (5)	United States	Detroit Shock
2009	Cappie Pondexter	United States	Phoenix Mercury	Sophia Young (3)	(Saint Vincent and the Grenadines) St. Vincent	San Antonio Silver Stars
2009	Tamika Catchings (7)	United States	Indiana Fever	Candace Parker (2)	United States	Los Angeles Sparks
2009	Lauren Jackson (7)	Australia	Seattle Storm	Lisa Leslie (12)	United States	Los Angeles Sparks
2010	Diana Taurasi (7)	United States	Phoenix Mercury	Sue Bird (6)	United States	Seattle Storm
2010	Cappie Pondexter (2)	United States	New York Liberty	Katie Douglas (4)	United States	Indiana Fever
2010	Tamika Catchings (8)	United States	Indiana Fever	Angel McCoughtry	United States	Atlanta Dream
2010	**Lauren Jackson** (8)	Australia	Seattle Storm	Crystal Langhorne	United States	Washington Mystics
2010	Sylvia Fowles	United States	Chicago Sky	Tina Charles	United States	Connecticut Sun
2011	Lindsay Whalen (2)	United States	Minnesota Lynx	Sue Bird (7)	United States	Seattle Storm
2011	Diana Taurasi (8)	United States	Phoenix Mercury	Seimone Augustus (3)	United States	Minnesota Lynx
2011	Angel McCoughtry (2)	United States	Atlanta Dream	Cappie Pondexter (3)	United States	New York Liberty
2011	**Tamika Catchings** (9)	United States	Indiana Fever	Penny Taylor (2)	Australia	Phoenix Mercury
2011	Tina Charles (2)	United States	Connecticut Sun	Sylvia Fowles (2)	United States	Chicago Sky
2012	Seimone Augustus (4)	United States	Minnesota Lynx	Lindsay Whalen (3)	United States	Minnesota Lynx
2012	Cappie Pondexter (4)	United States	New York Liberty	Kristi Toliver	United States	Los Angeles Sparks
2012	Tamika Catchings (10)	United States	Indiana Fever	Maya Moore	United States	Minnesota Lynx
2012	Candace Parker (3)	United States	Los Angeles Sparks	Sophia Young (4)	United States	San Antonio Silver Stars
2012	**Tina Charles** (3)	United States	Connecticut Sun	Sylvia Fowles (3)	United States	Chicago Sky
2013	Lindsay Whalen (4)	United States	Minnesota Lynx	Seimone Augustus (5)	United States	Minnesota Lynx
2013	Diana Taurasi (9)	United States	Phoenix Mercury	Angel McCoughtry (3)	United States	Atlanta Dream
2013	Maya Moore (2)	United States	Minnesota Lynx	Tamika Catchings (11)	United States	Indiana Fever
2013	**Candace Parker** (4)	United States	Los Angeles Sparks	Elena Delle Donne	United States	Chicago Sky
2013	Sylvia Fowles (4)	United States	Chicago Sky	Tina Charles (4)	United States	Connecticut Sun
2014	Skylar Diggins-Smith	United States	Tulsa Shock	Lindsay Whalen (5)	United States	Minnesota Lynx
2014	Diana Taurasi (10)	United States	Phoenix Mercury	Danielle Robinson	United States	San Antonio Stars
2014	**Maya Moore** (3)	United States	Minnesota Lynx	Seimone Augustus (6)	United States	Minnesota Lynx
2014	Candace Parker (5)	United States	Los Angeles Sparks	Angel McCoughtry (4)	United States	Atlanta Dream
2014	Brittney Griner	United States	Phoenix Mercury	Nneka Ogwumike	United States	Seattle Storm
2014				Tina Charles (5)	United States	New York Liberty
2015	Maya Moore (4)	United States	Minnesota Lynx	Courtney Vandersloot	United States	Chicago Sky
2015	Angel McCoughtry (5)	United States	Atlanta Dream	Epiphanny Prince	United States	New York Liberty
2015	**Elena Delle Donne** (2)	United States	Chicago Sky	Tamika Catchings (12)	United States	Indiana Fever
2015	DeWanna Bonner	United States	Phoenix Mercury	Candace Parker (6)	United States	Los Angeles Sparks
2015	Tina Charles (6)	United States	New York Liberty	Brittney Griner (2)	United States	Phoenix Mercury
2016	Sue Bird (8)	United States	Seattle Storm	Diana Taurasi (11)	United States	Phoenix Mercury
2016	Maya Moore (5)	United States	Minnesota Lynx	Jewell Loyd	United States	Seattle Storm
2016	Elena Delle Donne (3)	United States	Chicago Sky	Angel McCoughtry (6)	United States	Atlanta Dream
2016	**Nneka Ogwumike** (2)	United States	Los Angeles Sparks	Breanna Stewart	United States	Seattle Storm
2016	Tina Charles (7)	United States	New York Liberty	Sylvia Fowles (5)	United States	Minnesota Lynx
2017	Skylar Diggins-Smith (2)	United States	Dallas Wings	Chelsea Gray	United States	Los Angeles Sparks
2017	Maya Moore (6)	United States	Minnesota Lynx	Diana Taurasi (12)	United States	Phoenix Mercury
2017	Candace Parker (7)	United States	Los Angeles Sparks	Nneka Ogwumike (3)	United States	Los Angeles Sparks
2017	Tina Charles (8)	United States	New York Liberty	Jonquel Jones	Bahamas	Connecticut Sun
2017	**Sylvia Fowles** (6)	United States	Minnesota Lynx	Brittney Griner (3)	United States	Phoenix Mercury
2018	Diana Taurasi (13)	United States	Phoenix Mercury	Courtney Vandersloot (2)	United States	Chicago Sky
2018	Tiffany Hayes	United States	Atlanta Dream	Skylar Diggins-Smith (3)	United States	Dallas Wings
2018	Elena Delle Donne (4)	United States	Washington Mystics	Maya Moore (7)	United States	Minnesota Lynx
2018	**Breanna Stewart** (2)	United States	Seattle Storm	Candace Parker (8)	United States	Los Angeles Sparks
2018	Liz Cambage	Australia	Dallas Wings	Brittney Griner (4)	United States	Phoenix Mercury
2019	Courtney Vandersloot (3)	United States	Chicago Sky	Odyssey Sims	United States	Minnesota Lynx
2019	Chelsea Gray (2)	United States	Los Angeles Sparks	Diamond DeShields	United States	Chicago Sky
2019	**Elena Delle Donne** (5)	United States	Washington Mystics	Nneka Ogwumike (4)	United States	Los Angeles Sparks
2019	Natasha Howard	United States	Seattle Storm	Jonquel Jones (2)	Bahamas	Connecticut Sun
2019	Brittney Griner (5)	United States	Phoenix Mercury	Liz Cambage (2)	Australia	Las Vegas Aces
2020	Courtney Vandersloot (4)	United States	Chicago Sky	Diana Taurasi (14)	United States	Phoenix Mercury
2020	Arike Ogunbowale	United States	Dallas Wings	Skylar Diggins-Smith (4)	United States	Phoenix Mercury
2020	**A'ja Wilson**	United States	Las Vegas Aces	Myisha Hines-Allen	United States	Washington Mystics
2020	Breanna Stewart (3)	United States	Seattle Storm	DeWanna Bonner (2)	United States	Connecticut Sun
2020	Candace Parker (9)	United States	Los Angeles Sparks	Napheesa Collier	United States	Minnesota Lynx
2021	**Jonquel Jones** (3)	Bahamas	Connecticut Sun	A'ja Wilson (2)	United States	Las Vegas Aces
2021	Skylar Diggins-Smith (5)	United States	Phoenix Mercury	Sylvia Fowles (7)	United States	Minnesota Lynx
2021	Brittney Griner (6)	United States	Phoenix Mercury	Arike Ogunbowale (2)	United States	Dallas Wings
2021	Breanna Stewart (4)	United States	Seattle Storm	Tina Charles (9)	United States	Washington Mystics
2021	Jewell Loyd (2)	United States	Seattle Storm	Courtney Vandersloot (5)	United States	Chicago Sky
2022	**A'ja Wilson** (3)	United States	Las Vegas Aces	Alyssa Thomas	United States	Connecticut Sun
2022	Breanna Stewart (5)	United States	Seattle Storm	Sabrina Ionescu	United States	New York Liberty
2022	Kelsey Plum	United States	Las Vegas Aces	Nneka Ogwumike (5)	United States	Los Angeles Sparks
2022	Skylar Diggins-Smith (6)	United States	Phoenix Mercury	Jonquel Jones (4)	Bahamas	Connecticut Sun
2022	Candace Parker (10)	United States	Chicago Sky	Sylvia Fowles (8)	United States	Minnesota Lynx
2023	**Breanna Stewart** (6)	United States	New York Liberty	Nneka Ogwumike (6)	United States	Los Angeles Sparks
2023	Alyssa Thomas (2)	United States	Connecticut Sun	Jackie Young	United States	Las Vegas Aces
2023	A'ja Wilson (4)	United States	Las Vegas Aces	Chelsea Gray (3)	United States	Las Vegas Aces
2023	Napheesa Collier (2)	United States	Minnesota Lynx	Jewell Loyd (3)	United States	Seattle Storm
2023	Satou Sabally	Germany	Dallas Wings	Sabrina Ionescu (2)	United States	New York Liberty
2024	**A'ja Wilson** (5)	United States	Las Vegas Aces	Sabrina Ionescu (3)	United States	New York Liberty
2024	Napheesa Collier (3)	United States	Minnesota Lynx	Kahleah Copper	United States	Phoenix Mercury
2024	Breanna Stewart (7)	United States	New York Liberty	Nneka Ogwumike (7)	United States	Seattle Storm
2024	Caitlin Clark	United States	Indiana Fever	Arike Ogunbowale (3)	United States	Dallas Wings
2024	Alyssa Thomas (3)	United States	Connecticut Sun	Jonquel Jones (5)	Bahamas	New York Liberty
2025	**A'ja Wilson** (6)	United States	Las Vegas Aces	Nneka Ogwumike (8)	United States	Seattle Storm
2025	Napheesa Collier (4)	United States	Minnesota Lynx	Jackie Young (2)	United States	Las Vegas Aces
2025	Alyssa Thomas (4)	United States	Phoenix Mercury	Sabrina Ionescu (4)	United States	New York Liberty
2025	Allisha Gray	United States	Atlanta Dream	Aliyah Boston	United States	Indiana Fever
2025	Kelsey Mitchell	United States	Indiana Fever	Paige Bueckers	United States	Dallas Wings
2026	Olivia Miles	United States	Minnesota Lynx	Paige Bueckers (2)	United States	Dallas Wings
2026	Caitlin Clark (2)	United States	Indiana Fever	Jackie Young (3)	United States	Las Vegas Aces
2026	Kelsey Mitchell (2)	United States	Indiana Fever	Rhyne Howard	United States	Atlanta Dream
2026	Breanna Stewart (8)	United States	New York Liberty	Angel Reese	United States	Atlanta Dream
2026	**A'ja Wilson** (7)	United States	Las Vegas Aces	Shakira Austin	United States	Washington Mystics

== Most selections ==
The following table lists players with at least seven total selections.

Player	Total	First Team	Second Team	MVP	Seasons Played
Diana Taurasi	14	10	4	1	20
Lisa Leslie	12	8	4	3	12
Tamika Catchings	12	7	5	1	15
Candace Parker	10	7	3	2	14
Tina Charles	9	5	4	1	14
Breanna Stewart	8	7	1	2	10
Lauren Jackson	8	7	1	3	12
Sue Bird	8	5	3	0	17
Sylvia Fowles	8	3	5	2	15
Tina Thompson	8	3	5	0	17
Nneka Ogwumike	8	1	7	1	15
Maya Moore	7	5	2	1	8
A'ja Wilson	7	6	1	5	9
Sheryl Swoopes	7	5	2	3	12

== See also ==
- List of sports awards honoring women
- All-NBA Team
