= Kionna Jeter =

American basketball player

Personal information
- Born: October 4, 1997 (age 29) Spartanburg, South Carolina
- Listed height: 5 ft 8 in (1.73 m)

Career information
- High school: Spartanburg (Spartanburg, South Carolina)
- College: Gulf Coast State (2017–2018); Towson (2018–2021)
- WNBA draft: 2021: 3rd round, 36th overall pick
- Drafted by: Las Vegas Aces
- Position: Guard

Career highlights
- 3× First-team All-CAA (2019–2021); 2x CAA All-Defensive Team (2019, 2020)
- Stats at Basketball Reference

Kionna Jeter (born 1997) is an American basketball player. She was drafted in the third round of the 2021 WNBA draft by the Las Vegas Aces. She plays the Point Guard position.

== Early life ==
Jeter grew up in Spartanburg, South Carolina, where she attended Spartanburg High School.

== College career ==
Jeter originally signed to play at Coastal Carolina University before transferring to Gulf Coast State, where she played for one year.

From Gulf Coast State, Jeter transferred to Towson University, where she played for three years. She was the 2020-21 Colonial Athletic Association preseason player of the year and was the first Towson player to earn three consecutive all-CAA first team selection as well as back-to-back CAA all-defensive team honors. She led Towson to the NCAA tournament in 2019.

== Professional career ==
In 2021, Jeter decided to forgo her final year of eligibility with Towson and enter the 2021 WNBA draft. She was drafted by the Las Vegas Aces with the 36th pick but was waived before the start of the 2021 season.

In July 2022, Jeter signed with Faenza Basket Project of the Italian Serie A1. In August 2023, Jeter signed with reigning Úrvalsdeild kvenna champions Valur. She left the team before the start of the season.

== Career statistics ==
Legend
GP	Games played	GS	Games started	MPG	Minutes per game	RPG	Rebounds per game
APG	Assists per game	SPG	Steals per game	BPG	Blocks per game	PPG	Points per game
TO	Turnovers per game	FG%	Field-goal percentage	3P%	3-point field-goal percentage	FT%	Free-throw percentage
**Bold**	Career best	°	League leader

=== College ===
Year	Team	GP	GS	MPG	FG%	3P%	FT%	RPG	APG	SPG	BPG	TO	PPG
2018–19	Towson	**33**	**33**	33.2	42.0	29.9	80.8	5.4	1.7	2.7	**0.3**	2.7	17.3
2019–20	Towson	29	28	**33.5**	39.6	33.5	**80.0**	**6.7**	**2.4**	**3.3**	0.2	2.5	18.1
2020–21	Towson	21	19	32.9	**42.8**	**34.6**	75.3	5.1	2.3	2.5	0.2	**1.9**	**23.0**
**Career**		83	80	33.2	41.4	32.6	79.0	5.8	2.1	2.9	0.2	2.4	19.1
Statistics retrieved from Sports-Reference.
