= 2021 WNBA draft =

Women's basketball event

General information
- Sport: Basketball
- Date: April 15, 2021
- Location: Virtually
- Networks: United States: ESPN; Canada: TSN2

Overview
- League: WNBA
- Teams: 12
- First selection: Charli Collier; Dallas Wings (via trade)

The 2021 WNBA draft was the WNBA's draft for the 2021 WNBA season. A draft lottery was held on December 4, 2020, and the New York Liberty were awarded the first overall pick once again in the draft. The draft was held on April 15, and televised on ESPN in the United States and on TSN2 in Canada at 7:00 p.m. EDT.

== Draft lottery ==
The lottery selection to determine the order of the top four picks in the 2021 draft took place during halftime of the DePaul Blue Demons game against the Louisville Cardinals on December 4, 2020, and was televised on ESPN in the United States and across the TSN Network in Canada. The same four non-playoff teams in 2020 qualified for the lottery drawing: Indiana Fever, Dallas Wings, New York Liberty and Atlanta Dream.

The lottery was won by the New York Liberty, who had the best chance to win the lottery as they did in 2020. The Dallas Wings were awarded the second pick for the second consecutive year, followed by the Atlanta Dream and finally the Indiana Fever. The Liberty would later trade their first pick to the Seattle Storm, who in turn traded it to the Wings. This marks the first time that one team has held the top two picks in the draft in WNBA history.

=== Lottery chances ===
Team	Combined 2019–20 record	Lottery chances	Result
New York Liberty	12–44	44.2%	1st pick
Atlanta Dream	15–41	27.6%	3rd pick
Dallas Wings	18–38	17.8%	2nd pick
Indiana Fever	19–37	10.4%	4th pick

The lottery odds were based on combined records from the 2019 and 2020 WNBA seasons. In the drawing, 14 balls numbered 1–14 are placed in a lottery machine and mixed. Four balls are drawn to determine a four-digit combination (only 11–12–13–14 is ignored and redrawn). The team to which that four-ball combination is assigned receives the No. 1 pick. The four balls are then placed back into the machine and the process is repeated to determine the second pick. The two teams whose numerical combinations do not come up in the lottery will select in the inverse order of their two-year cumulative record. Ernst & Young knows the discreet results before they are announced.

The order of selection for the remainder of the first round as well as the second and third rounds was determined by inverse order of the teams' respective regular-season records solely from 2020.

== Eligibility ==
Under the current collective bargaining agreement (CBA) between the WNBA and its players union, draft eligibility for players not defined as "international" requires the following to be true:

- The player's 22nd birthday falls during the calendar year of the draft. For this draft, the cutoff birth date is December 31, 1999.
- She has either:
  - completed her college eligibility;
  - received a bachelor's degree, or is scheduled to receive such in the 3 months following the draft; or
  - is at least 4 years removed from high school graduation.

A player who is scheduled to receive her bachelor's degree within 3 months of the draft date, and is younger than the cutoff age, is only eligible if the calendar year of the draft is no earlier than the fourth after her high school graduation.

Players with remaining college eligibility who meet the cutoff age must notify the WNBA headquarters of their intent to enter the draft no later than 10 days before the draft date, and must renounce any remaining college eligibility to do so. A separate notification timetable is provided for players involved in postseason tournaments (most notably the NCAA Division I tournament); those players (normally) must declare for the draft within 24 hours of their final game.

"International players" are defined as those for whom all of the following is true:

- Born and currently residing outside the U.S.
- Never "exercised intercollegiate basketball eligibility" in the U.S.

For "international players", the eligibility age is 20, also measured on December 31 of the year of the draft.

For the 2021 draft only, the WNBA and its players union agreed to a modification of the normal eligibility rules. The most significant change is that all otherwise eligible college players who wished to enter the draft, including seniors in 2020–21, had to declare for draft entry. Due to an NCAA ruling that the 2020–21 season, dramatically affected by COVID-19, would not be counted against the college eligibility of any basketball player, every college senior in the 2020–21 season had remaining eligibility. Players who wished to be drafted had to notify the league by email no later than April 1, except for those involved in the 2021 Final Four, who had a 48-hour opt-in window after the completion of their last game instead of the normal 24 hours. Players who had opted in had until midnight on April 10 (0400 UTC, April 11) to opt out. This is similar to special 2021 draft declaration rules announced by the NBA, which also required seniors to opt into the draft.

On April 3, the WNBA announced that 52 college players had opted into the draft. This did not include players from the Final Four teams (Arizona, South Carolina, Stanford, UConn); South Carolina and UConn lost in the semifinals on April 2, while Stanford defeated Arizona in the championship game on April 4. On April 7, the WNBA announced that one of the original 52 players had withdrawn from consideration, and that six additional players had opted into the draft. Four players from the initial list of 52 would opt out by the final deadline of April 11.

- Asheika Alexander, Langston
- Janelle Bailey, North Carolina
- Trinity Baptiste, Arizona
- Kate Cain, Nebraska
- Maya Caldwell, Georgia
- Sierra Campisano, Cal Poly
- DiJonai Carrington, Baylor
- Deja Church, DePaul
- Charli Collier, Texas (age-eligible junior)
- Gaby Connally, Georgia
- Rennia Davis, Tennessee
- (Belgium) Lore Devos, Colorado State
- Chelsea Dungee, Arkansas
- Dana Evans, Louisville
- Kysre Gondrezick, West Virginia
- Aleah Goodman, Oregon State
- Arella Guirantes, Rutgers
- Valerie Higgins, Pacific
- (Czech Republic) Petra Holešínská, North Carolina
- Jordan Jenkins, UTEP
- Kionna Jeter, Towson
- Akinreh Johnson, Michigan
- Ciera Johnson, Texas A&M
- N'dea Jones, Texas A&M
- Micaela Kelly, Central Michigan
- Natalie Kucowski, Lafayette
- Kasiyahna Kushkituah, Tennessee
- Selena Lott, Marquette
- Natasha Mack, Oklahoma State
- (Australia) Tiana Mangakahia, Syracuse
- Aari McDonald, Arizona
- (Spain) Blanca Millán, Maine
- (France) Johanna Muzet, Rhode Island
- Michaela Onyenwere, UCLA
- Chasity Patterson, Kentucky
- Chelsey Perry, UT Martin
- Lindsey Pulliam, Northwestern
- (Serbia) Ivana Raca, Wake Forest
- DiDi Richards, Baylor
- Destiny Slocum, Arkansas
- LaPresha Stanley, Appalachian State
- Tesia Thompson, Southeast Missouri
- Unique Thompson, Auburn
- Jill Townsend, Gonzaga
- Mikayla Vaughn, Notre Dame
- Destinee Walker, Notre Dame
- Jasmine Walker, Alabama
- Stephanie Watts, North Carolina
- Tyra Whitehead, San Jose State
- Kiana Williams, Stanford
- Aaliyah Wilson, Texas A&M
- Jenn Wirth, Gonzaga
- LeeAnne Wirth, Gonzaga

== Draft ==
^{#}	Denotes player who never played in the WNBA regular season or playoffs
**Bold**	Denotes player who won Rookie of the Year

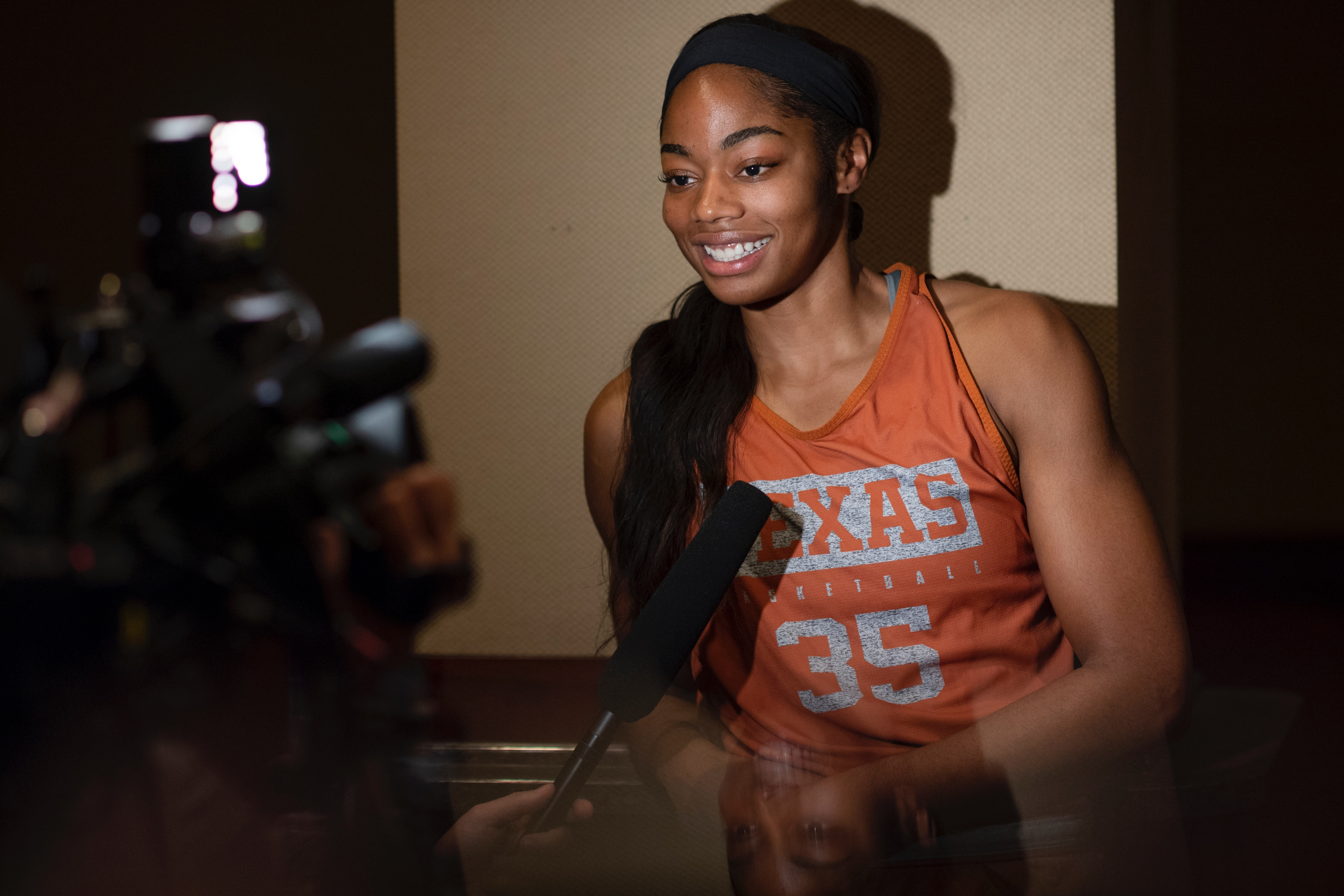
Charli Collier was selected 1st overall by the Dallas Wings.

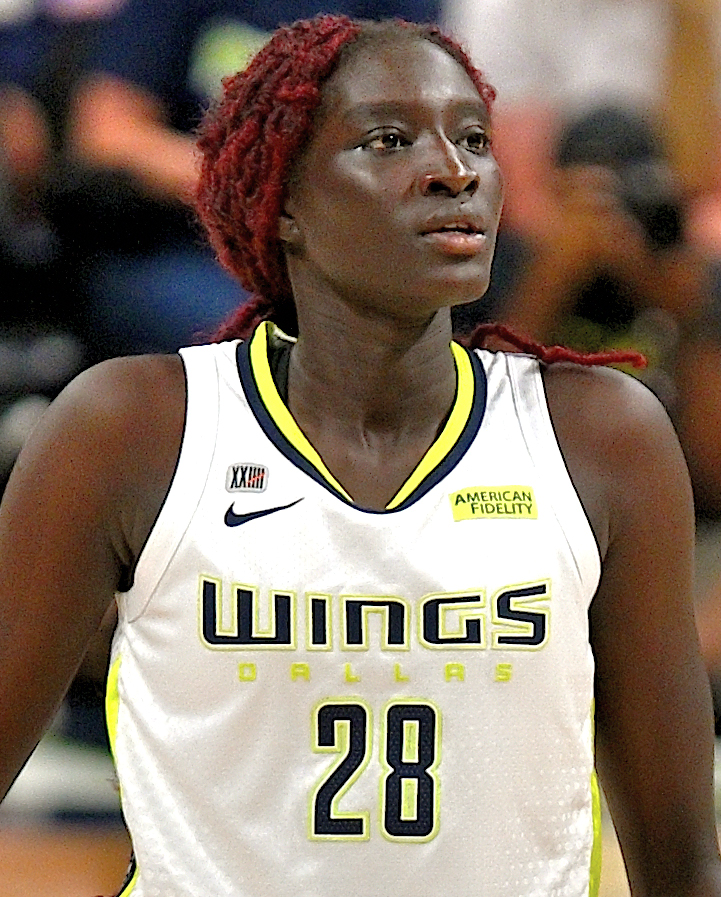
Awak Kuier was selected 2nd overall by the Dallas Wings.

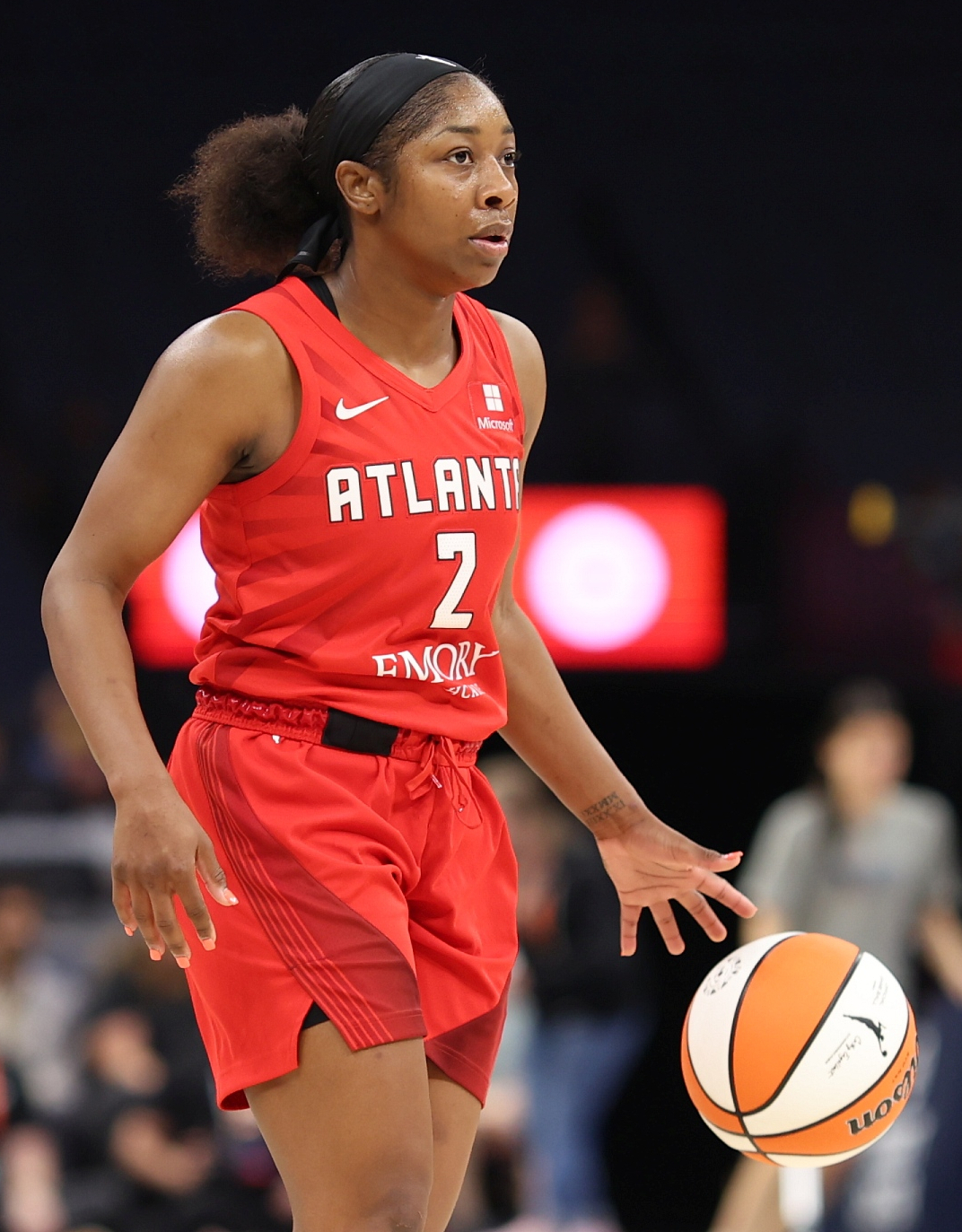
Aari McDonald was selected 3rd overall by the Atlanta Dream.

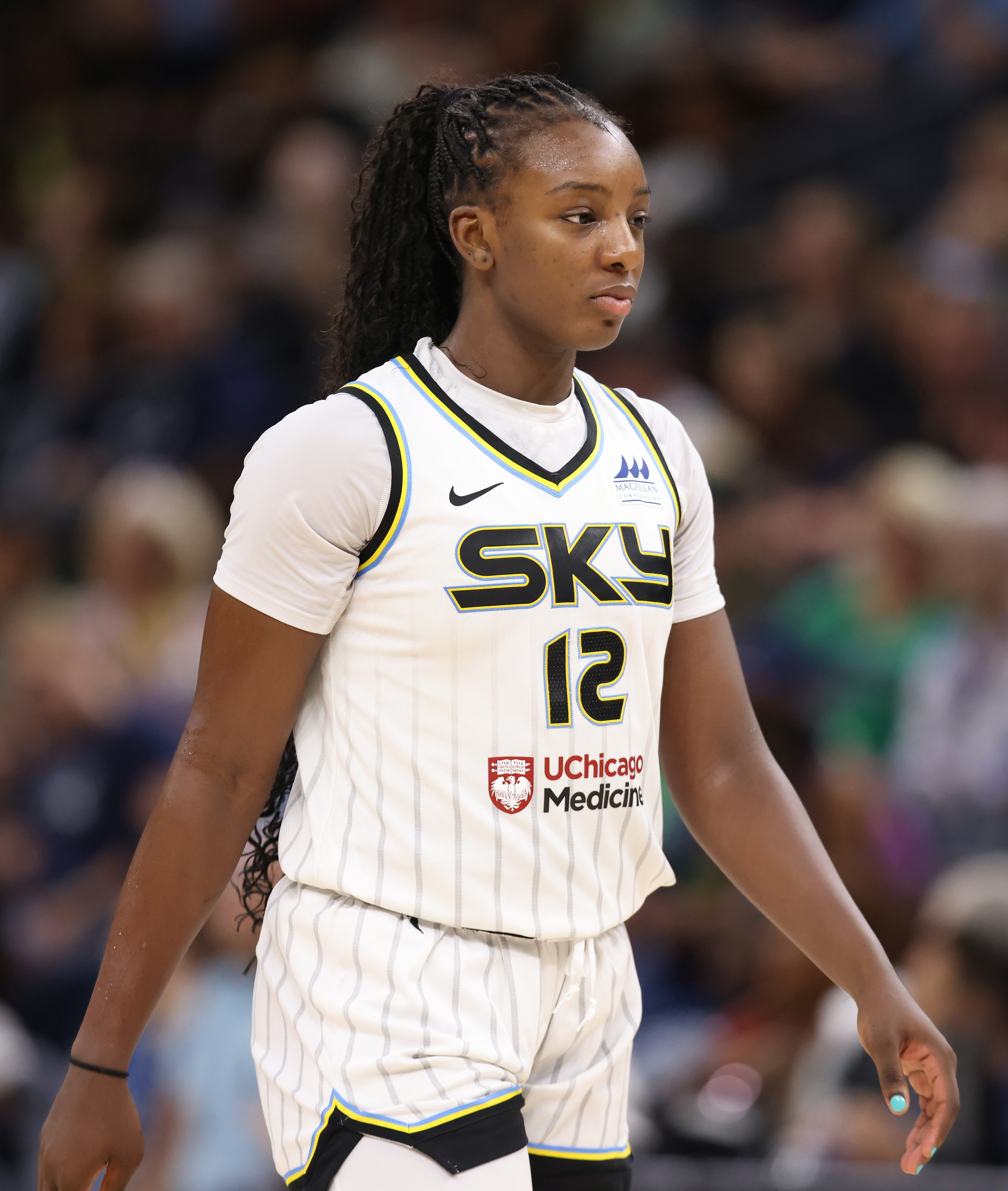
Michaela Onyenwere was selected 6th overall by the New York Liberty.

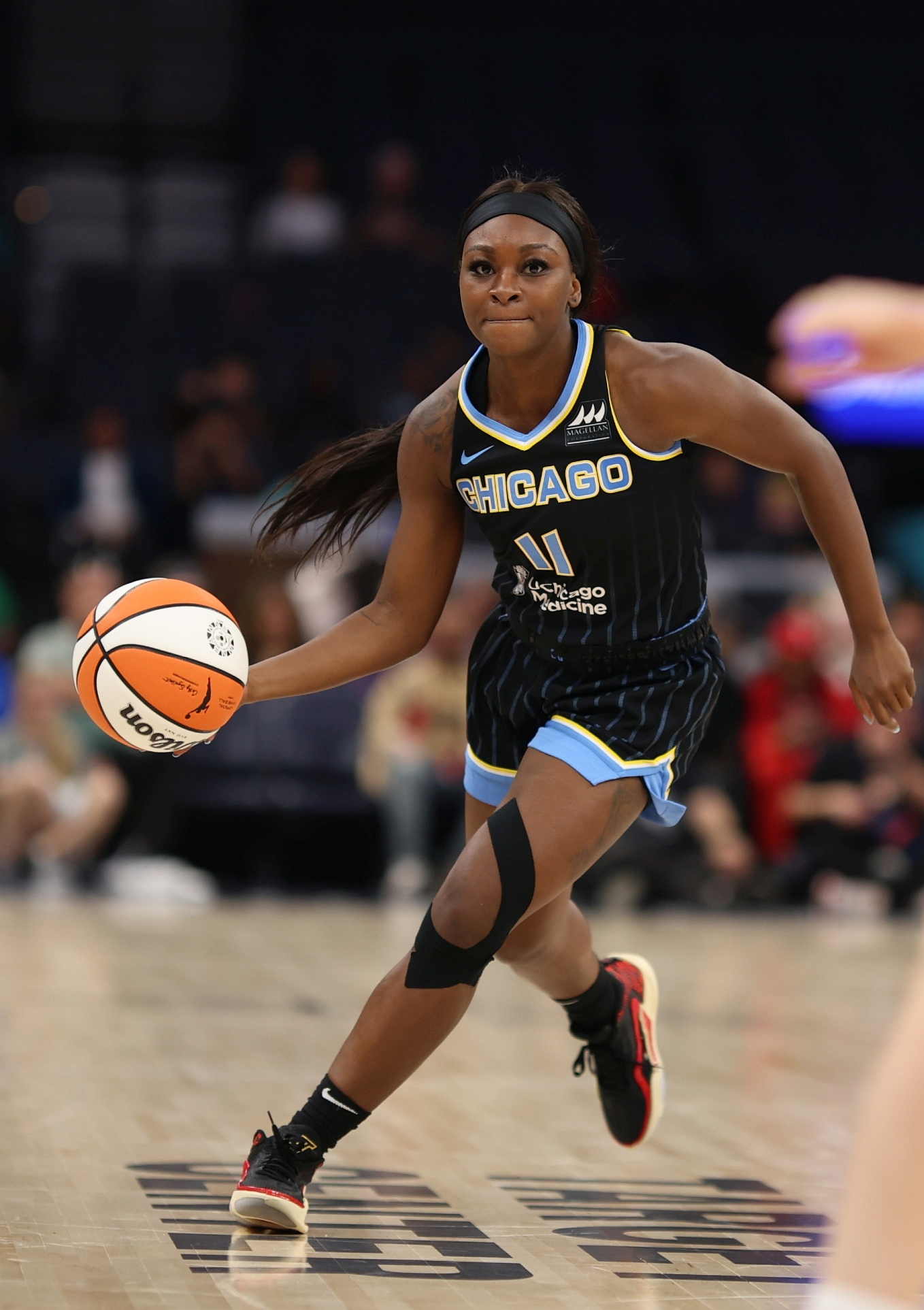
Dana Evans was selected 13th overall by the Dallas Wings.

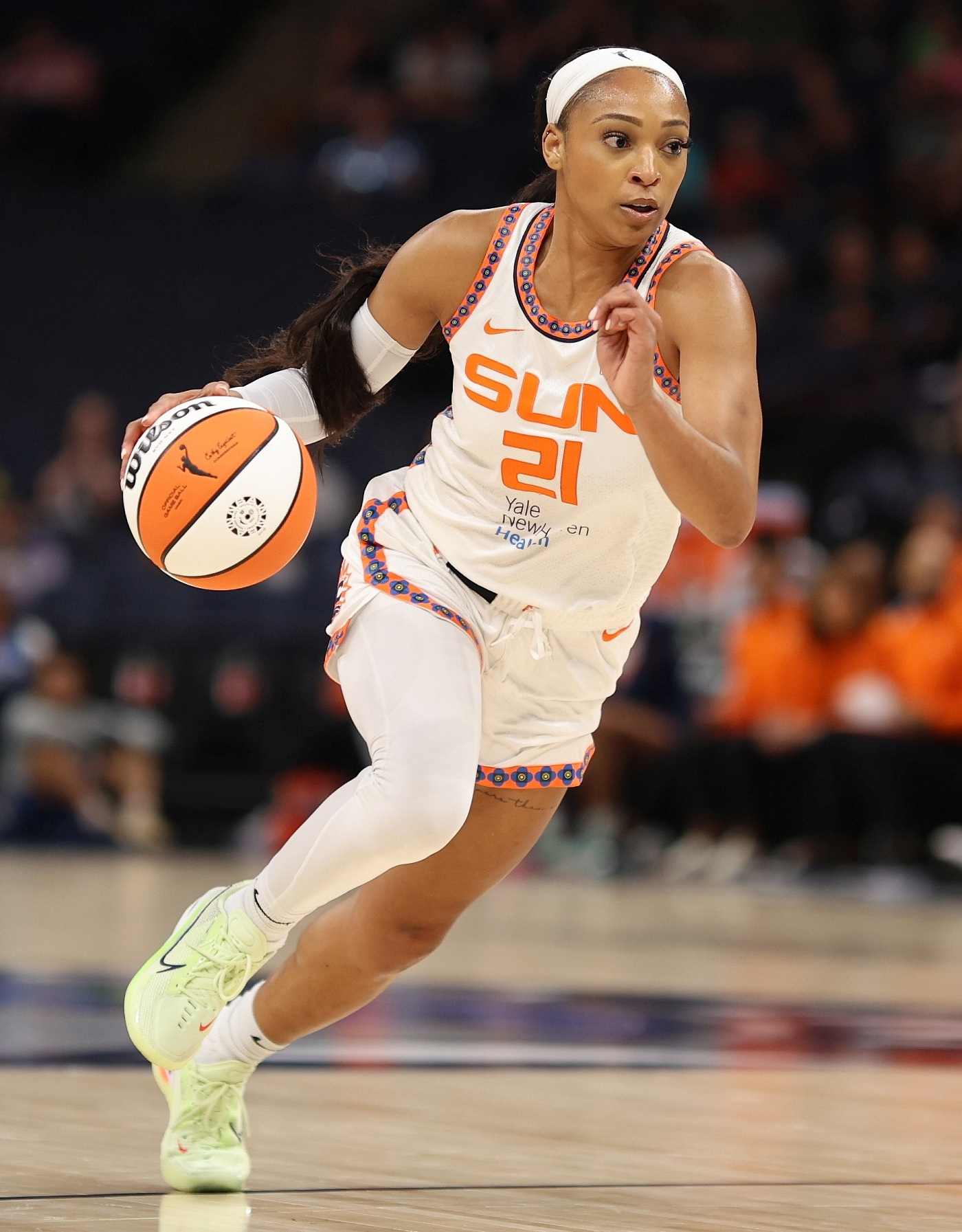
DiJonai Carrington was selected 20th overall by the Connecticut Sun.

=== First round ===
Pick	Player	Nationality	Team	School / Club team
1	Charli Collier	United States	Dallas Wings (from New York via Seattle) (Note: February 10, 2021: New York to Seattle: New York acquired Natasha Howard; Seattle acquired 2021 first-round and 2022 second-round picks, and Phoenix's 2022 first-round pick) (Note: February 10, 2021: Seattle to Dallas: Seattle acquired Katie Lou Samuelson and a 2022 second-round pick; Dallas acquired New York's 2021 first-round pick)	Texas
2	Awak Kuier	Finland	Dallas Wings	Passalacqua Ragusa (Italy)
3	Aari McDonald	United States	Atlanta Dream	Arizona
4	Kysre Gondrezick	United States	Indiana Fever	West Virginia
5	Chelsea Dungee	United States	Dallas Wings (from Washington via New York) (Note: April 15, 2020: Three-team trade: Dallas acquired Washington's 2021 first-round pick and a 2021 second-round pick from New York; New York acquired 2021 second- and third-round picks, 2020 first-round picks and second-round pick, and Shatori Walker-Kimbrough from Washington; Las Vegas's 2020 first-round pick, 2020 second-round picks, and Tayler Hill from Dallas; Washington acquired Tina Charles from New York)	Arkansas
6	**Michaela Onyenwere**	United States	New York Liberty (from Connecticut via Phoenix) (Note: February 11, 2020: Connecticut to Phoenix: Phoenix acquired a 2021 first-round pick and two 2020 first-round picks; Connecticut acquired DeWanna Bonner) (Note: February 10, 2021: Phoenix to New York: Phoenix acquired Kia Nurse and Megan Walker; New York acquired a 2021 first-round pick and Phoenix's 2022 first-round pick)	UCLA
7	Jasmine Walker	United States	Los Angeles Sparks (from Chicago via Dallas) (Note: February 14, 2020: Chicago to Dallas: Dallas acquired Katie Lou Samuelson and a 2021 first-round pick; Chicago acquired Azurá Stevens) (Note: April 14, 2021: Dallas to Los Angeles: Los Angeles acquired a 2021 first-round pick and a 2022 second-round pick; Dallas acquired a 2022 first-round pick)	Alabama
8	Shyla Heal	Australia	Chicago Sky (from Phoenix via Dallas) (Note: February 12, 2020: Phoenix to Dallas: Phoenix acquired Skylar Diggins-Smith; Dallas acquired a 2021 first-round pick and two 2020 first-round picks) (Note: February 12, 2020: Dallas to Chicago: Dallas acquired Astou Ndour; Chicago acquired Phoenix's 2021 first-round pick)	Townsville Fire (Australia)
9	Rennia Davis	United States	Minnesota Lynx	Tennessee
10	Stephanie Watts	United States	Los Angeles Sparks	North Carolina
11	Aaliyah Wilson	United States	Seattle Storm	Texas A&M
12	Iliana Rupert	France	Las Vegas Aces	Tango Bourges Basket (France)

=== Second round ===
Pick	Player	Nationality	Team	School / club team
13	Dana Evans	United States	Dallas Wings (from New York)	Louisville
14	Destiny Slocum	United States	Las Vegas Aces (from Indiana) (Note: February 15, 2021: Indiana to Las Vegas: Las Vegas acquired a 2021 second-round pick; Indiana acquired Lindsay Allen and a 2021 second-round pick)	Arkansas
15	Raquel Carrera	Spain	Atlanta Dream	Valencia Basket (Spain)
16	Natasha Mack	United States	Chicago Sky (from Dallas via Los Angeles) (Note: February 21, 2020: Dallas to Los Angeles: Los Angeles acquired a 2021 second-round pick; Dallas acquired Marina Mabrey) (Note: May 26, 2020: Los Angeles to Dallas: Dallas reacquired its own original 2021 second-round pick; Los Angeles acquired Kristine Anigwe and a 2021 third-round pick) (Note: February 9, 2021: Dallas to Chicago: Chicago acquired the 2021 second-round pick; Dallas acquired a 2022 second-round pick)	Oklahoma State
17	DiDi Richards	United States	New York Liberty (from Washington)	Baylor
18	Kiana Williams	United States	Seattle Storm (from Connecticut) (Note: February 24, 2020: Connecticut to Seattle: Connecticut acquired Kaleena Mosqueda-Lewis; Seattle acquired a 2021 second-round pick)	Stanford
19	Unique Thompson^{#}	United States	Indiana Fever (from Chicago) (Note: August 28, 2020: Chicago to Indiana: Indiana acquired Jantel Lavender and 2021 second- and third-round picks; Chicago acquired Stephanie Mavunga)	Auburn
20	DiJonai Carrington	United States	Connecticut Sun (from Phoenix) (Note: February 19, 2020: Phoenix to Connecticut (three-team trade with Atlanta): Connecticut acquired Briann January and a 2021 second-round pick from Phoenix; Atlanta acquired a 2020 second-round pick from Phoenix and Courtney Williams from Connecticut; Phoenix acquired Jessica Breland and Nia Coffey from Atlanta)	Baylor
21	Micaela Kelly^{#}	United States	Connecticut Sun (from Minnesota) (Note: February 25, 2020: Minnesota to Connecticut: Minnesota acquired Rachel Banham; Connecticut acquired a 2021 second-round pick)	Central Michigan
22	Arella Guirantes	United States	Los Angeles Sparks	Rutgers
23	N'dea Jones^{#}	United States	Seattle Storm	Texas A&M
24	Trinity Baptiste^{#}	United States	Indiana Fever (from Las Vegas)	Arizona

=== Third round ===
Pick	Player	Nationality	Team	School / club team
25	Valerie Higgins^{#}	United States	New York Liberty	Pacific
26	Chelsey Perry	United States	Indiana Fever	UT Martin
27	Lindsey Pulliam^{#}	United States	Atlanta Dream	Northwestern
28	Ivana Raca^{#}	Serbia	Los Angeles Sparks (from Dallas)	Wake Forest
29	Marine Fauthoux	France	New York Liberty (from Washington)	ASVEL Féminin (France)
30	Aleah Goodman	United States	Connecticut Sun	Oregon State
31	Florencia Chagas^{#}	Argentina	Indiana Fever (from Chicago)	Empoli (Italy)
32	Ciera Johnson^{#}	United States	Phoenix Mercury	Texas A&M
33	Maya Caldwell	United States	Indiana Fever (from Minnesota) (Note: March 6, 2020: Minnesota to Indiana: Indiana acquired a 2021 third-round pick and New York's 2020 second-round pick; Minnesota acquired Shenise Johnson and a 2020 second-round pick)	Georgia
34	Aina Ayuso Bagur^{#}	Spain	Los Angeles Sparks	Casademont Zaragoza (Spain)
35	Natalie Kucowski^{#}	United States	Seattle Storm	Lafayette
36	Kionna Jeter^{#}	United States	Las Vegas Aces	Towson

== See also ==
- List of first overall WNBA draft picks
