= 2024 WNBA All-Star Game =

Exhibition basketball game

	1	2	3	4	Total
Team WNBA	24	31	36	29	117
Team USA	23	31	25	30	109
- Date: July 20, 2024
- Arena: Footprint Center
- City: Phoenix, Arizona, United States
- MVP: Arike Ogunbowale
- Halftime show: Pitbull
- Attendance: 16,407
- Network: United States: ABC; Canada: TSN5/SN1
- Announcers: Ryan Ruocco, Rebecca Lobo, Holly Rowe, LaChina Robinson, Carolyn Peck

WNBA All-Star Game
< 2023	2025 >

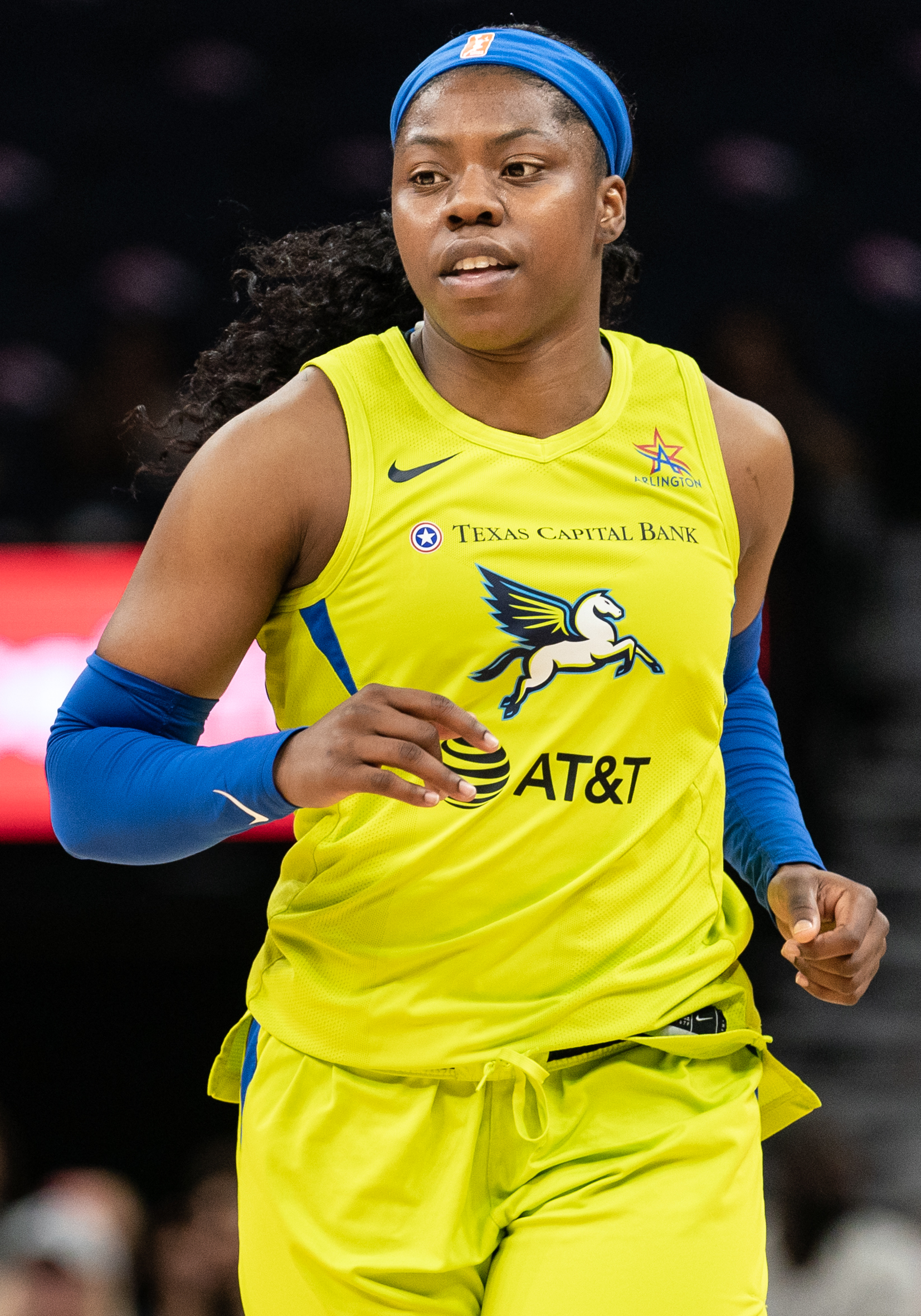
Dallas wings player Arike Ogunbowale in a game against the Minnesota Lynx

The 2024 WNBA All-Star Game was an exhibition women's basketball game played on July 20, 2024, at the Footprint Center in Phoenix, Arizona, United States as part of the 2024 WNBA season. The Phoenix Mercury hosted the game and related events for the third time, having previously hosted the 2000 All-Star Game and 2014 All-Star Game.

On July 19, 2024, Allisha Gray of the Atlanta Dream won both the Starry 3-Point Contest and Skills Challenge. She became the first player in WNBA history to win both events.

Team WNBA defeated Team USA 117–109. Team WNBA's Arike Ogunbowale broke the All-Star game scoring record, registering a total of 34 points (all in the second half) and earning her a second All-Star MVP Award. Caitlin Clark, the starting point guard for Team WNBA, set a new All-Star game record, recording 10 assists the most by a rookie in an All-Star game. Angel Reese set a new WNBA record by scoring a double double, as a rookie. The game also featured the most former WNBA first overall draft picks since the 2018 WNBA All-Star Game, with a total of 11 (Diana Taurasi, Nneka Ogwumike, Brittney Griner, Jewell Loyd, Breanna Stewart, Kelsey Plum, A'ja Wilson, Jackie Young, Sabrina Ionescu, Aliyah Boston, and Caitlin Clark).

The 2024 All-Star Game drew 3.44 million viewers on ABC, per Nielsen and peaked at 4.054 million, shattering the previous viewership record from the 2003 WNBA All-Star Game of 1.441 million.

== All-Star Game ==
=== Rosters ===
On March 20, the WNBA announced that 2024 would feature a matchup between the WNBA All-Stars who make up the US Women's National Team versus the remaining WNBA All-Stars. Fans, WNBA players, head coaches, sports writers, and broadcasters would all be able to vote for All-Stars. All groups could fill out a ballot of four guards and six front-court players. Players and coaches could not vote for members of their own team. Voting began on Thursday, June 13 at 2 p.m. ET and concluded on Saturday, June 29 at 11:59 p.m. ET.

The voting was weighted as follows:

Voting group	Vote weight
Fans	50%
WNBA players	25%
Sports media	25%

Players were not allowed to vote for their own teammates. The top 10 players receiving votes based on this weighting would be selected to the All-Star Game. Any top 10 vote-getter who has not already been named to the USA Women’s National Team 5-on-5 roster will automatically be assigned to Team WNBA. The names of the next 36 highest vote-getters, consisting of at least nine backcourt and 15 frontcourt players, will then be provided to the 12 WNBA head coaches, who will vote to fill the remaining spots for the 12-player Team WNBA roster. Coaches will not be able to vote for their own players.

==== Fan vote results ====
The following table lists the top five players based on fan voting alone.

†	Denotes player named to Team WNBA after first rounds of voting
*	Denotes player named to Team USA for 2024 Summer Olympics

Rank	Player	Number of Votes
1	Caitlin Clark †	700,735
2	Aliyah Boston †	618,680
3	A'ja Wilson *	607,300
4	Breanna Stewart *	424,135
5	Angel Reese	381,518

==== Team WNBA pool ====
The following tables list the 36 next-highest vote-getters provided to the 12 WNBA head coaches to fill the remaining eight spots for the 12-player Team WNBA roster.

°	Denotes player named to Team WNBA after head coach voting

Frontcourt
Player	Team
DeWanna Bonner °	Connecticut Sun
Cameron Brink	Los Angeles Sparks
Kamilla Cardoso	Chicago Sky
Tina Charles	Atlanta Dream
Alysha Clark	Las Vegas Aces
Aaliyah Edwards	Washington Mystics
Temi Fagbenle	Indiana Fever
Natasha Howard	Dallas Wings
Rickea Jackson	Los Angeles Sparks
Brionna Jones °	Connecticut Sun
Jonquel Jones °	New York Liberty
Ezi Magbegor	Seattle Storm
Nneka Ogwumike °	Seattle Storm
Angel Reese °	Chicago Sky
Katie Lou Samuelson	Indiana Fever
NaLyssa Smith	Indiana Fever
Alanna Smith	Minnesota Lynx
Kiah Stokes	Las Vegas Aces

Guards
Player	Team
Ariel Atkins	Washington Mystics
DiJonai Carrington	Connecticut Sun
Chennedy Carter	Chicago Sky
Natasha Cloud	Phoenix Mercury
Sophie Cunningham	Phoenix Mercury
Skylar Diggins-Smith	Seattle Storm
Allisha Gray °	Atlanta Dream
Tyasha Harris	Connecticut Sun
Rhyne Howard	Atlanta Dream
Lexie Hull	Indiana Fever
Betnijah Laney-Hamilton	New York Liberty
Marina Mabrey	Chicago Sky
Kate Martin	Las Vegas Aces
Kayla McBride °	Minnesota Lynx
Kelsey Mitchell °	Indiana Fever
Kristy Wallace	Indiana Fever
Erica Wheeler	Indiana Fever
Courtney Williams	Minnesota Lynx

=== Coaches ===
The head coach for Team USA was Cheryl Reeve, the current Minnesota Lynx head coach, and for Team WNBA was basketball legend and former Phoenix Mercury head coach, Cheryl Miller.

=== Final rosters ===
†	Denotes player named to Team WNBA after first rounds of voting
°	Denotes player named to Team WNBA after head coach voting

Team USA
Pos	Player	Team	No. of selections
Starters
G	Chelsea Gray	Las Vegas Aces	6
G	Jewell Loyd	Seattle Storm	6
F	Breanna Stewart	New York Liberty	6
G	Diana Taurasi	Phoenix Mercury	11
F	A'ja Wilson	Las Vegas Aces	6
Reserves
F	Napheesa Collier	Minnesota Lynx	4
G	Kahleah Copper	Phoenix Mercury	4
C	Brittney Griner	Phoenix Mercury	10
G	Sabrina Ionescu	New York Liberty	3
G	Kelsey Plum	Las Vegas Aces	3
F	Alyssa Thomas	Connecticut Sun	5
G	Jackie Young	Las Vegas Aces	3
Head coach: Cheryl Reeve (Minnesota Lynx)
Assistant coaches: Kara Lawson (Duke), Joni Taylor (Texas A&M), Mike Thibault

Team WNBA
Pos	Player	Team	No. of selections
Starters
F	DeWanna Bonner °	Connecticut Sun	6
G	Caitlin Clark †	Indiana Fever	1
C	Jonquel Jones °	New York Liberty	5
G	Arike Ogunbowale †	Dallas Wings	4
F	Nneka Ogwumike °	Seattle Storm	9
Reserves
C	Aliyah Boston †	Indiana Fever	2
G	Allisha Gray °	Atlanta Dream	2
F	Dearica Hamby †	Los Angeles Sparks	3
C	Brionna Jones °	Connecticut Sun	3
G	Kayla McBride °	Minnesota Lynx	4
G	Kelsey Mitchell °	Indiana Fever	2
F	Angel Reese °	Chicago Sky	1
Head coach: Cheryl Miller (Phoenix Mercury)
Assistant coach: Adrian Williams-Strong (Phoenix Mercury), Ann Meyers Drysdale

=== Game ===
ABC, TSN5/SN1

July 20, 2024
8:30 p.m. ET

Report

Team USA 109, Team WNBA 117
Scoring by quarter: 23-24, 31-28, 25–36, 30-29
Pts: Breanna Stewart (31); Rebs: Breanna Stewart (10); Asts: Kelsey Plum (6)	Pts: Arike Ogunbowale (34); Rebs: Angel Reese (11); Asts: Caitlin Clark (10)

Footprint Center, Phoenix, Arizona
Attendance: 16,407
Referees: Fatou Cissoko-Stephens, Jeff Wooten, Kevin Fahy

== All-Star Weekend ==
On March 20, 2024, it was announced that there would be a Three-Point Contest and Skills Challenge on July 19, the night before the All-Star game. It will be televised on ESPN in the US and on TSN2 in Canada. The Three-Point Contest is presented by Starry, while the WNBA Skills Challenge is presented by Kia.

On July 18, 2024, Nneka Ogwumike, the current president of Women's National Basketball Players Association, announced that Aflac would be giving both winners of the 2024 skills challenge and three-point contest a $55,000 bonus.

=== Three-Point Contest ===
The contestants for the three-point contest were announced on July 17, 2024.

Sabrina Ionescu, the reigning Three-Point Contest winner, and Caitlin Clark, the NCAA-W Division I all-time leader in three-pointers made, were both invited to participate in the 2024 contest; however, both declined.

Position	Player	Team	2024 Season 3-point statistics			1st Round	Final Round
Position	Player	Team	Made	Attempted	Percent	1st Round	Final Round
G	Allisha Gray	Atlanta	40	111	36.0	23	22
C	Jonquel Jones	New York	40	101	39.6	25	20
G	Kayla McBride	Minnesota	76	178	42.7	21	DNQ
C	Stefanie Dolson	Washington	49	101	48.5	20	DNQ
G	Marina Mabrey	Connecticut	56	161	34.8	19	DNQ

=== Skills Challenge ===
The contestants for the skills challenge were announced on July 17, 2024.

Erica Wheeler of the Indiana Fever was originally named as a contestant of the 2024 skills challenge but was unable to attend due to the global computer outages delaying her travel. Wheeler was replaced by fellow Fever teammate, Kelsey Mitchell.

Position	Player	Team	1st Round	Final Round
G	Allisha Gray	Atlanta	31.2	32.1
G	Sophie Cunningham	Phoenix	35.5	34.5
G	Marina Mabrey	Connecticut	35.7	DNQ
G	Kelsey Mitchell	Indiana	>35.7 (Note: Mitchell was not able to beat Mabrey's time of 35.7 seconds to move onto the final round)	DNQ
C	Brittney Griner	Phoenix	46.3	DNQ

== 3x3 Exhibition Game ==
On July 17, 2024, it was announced that the USA 3x3 Olympic team would face the Under-23 3x3 national team in exhibition on July 19, 2024.

=== 3x3 rosters ===
Team USA
Pos	Player	Team/College
F	Cierra Burdick	Basket Landes
F	Dearica Hamby	Los Angeles Sparks
G	Rhyne Howard	Atlanta Dream
G	Hailey Van Lith	TCU
Head coach: Jennifer Rizzotti
Assistant coach: Tammi Reiss

Team U–23
Pos	Player	Team/College
F	Christina Dalce	Maryland
G/F	Morgan Maly	Creighton
G/F	Cotie McMahon	Ohio State
G	Lucy Olsen	Iowa
G	Mikaylah Williams	LSU
F	Serah Williams	Wisconsin
Head coach: Christina Batastini

=== Game ===
ESPN, TSN2

19 July 2024
21:00 ET

Report

Team USA	19–16	U-23 Team USA
Pts: Howard (12)		Pts: M. Williams (5)

Footprint Center, Phoenix, Arizona
