= Victaria Saxton =

American basketball player (born 1999)

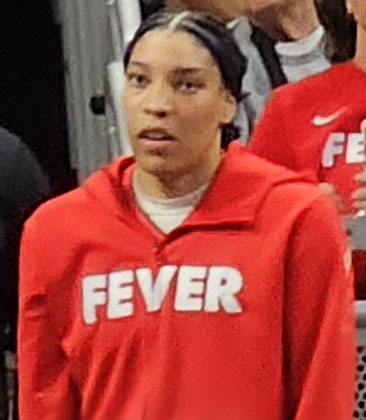
- Saxton with the Indiana Fever in 2024

Personal information
- Born: November 10, 1999 (age 27) Rome, Georgia, U.S.
- Listed height: 6 ft 2 in (1.88 m)
- Listed weight: 181 lb (82 kg)

Career information
- High school: Model High School (Rome, Georgia)
- College: South Carolina (2018–2023)
- WNBA draft: 2023: 3rd round, 25th overall pick
- Drafted by: Indiana Fever
- Playing career: 2023–present
- Position: Forward

Career history
- 2023–2024: Indiana Fever

Career highlights
- NCAA champion (2022); SEC All-Freshman Team (2019)
- Stats at Basketball Reference

Victaria Saxton (born November 10, 1999) is an American professional basketball player who is currently a free agent. She was drafted in the third round of the 2023 WNBA draft by the Indiana Fever. She played college basketball at South Carolina, where she won a national championship during the 2021–22 season. Saxton was waived by the Fever on February 3, 2025.

== Early life ==
Saxton was the 47th rated recruit of the 2018 high school class per ESPN's HoopGurlz rankings and the 6th-rated forward. In November 2017, Saxton signed to play with the South Carolina Gamecocks.

== College career ==
During her freshman season, Saxton was named to the SEC All-Freshman team after averaging 4.1 points and 3.0 rebounds per game. During the 2020–21 season, Saxton was named to the Hemisfair all-region team during the NCAA tournament.

After falling in the semifinals of the 2021 NCAA tournament, Saxton and the Gamecocks returned to the Final Four in 2022 and defeated the UConn Huskies in the title game to secure the program's second national title. Saxton returned to South Carolina for the 2022–23 season, taking advantage of the NCAA's COVID-19 eligibility extension.

During her seasons at South Carolina, Saxton won three SEC regular-season championships, three SEC tournament titles, three NCAA Final Four showings, and was ranked No. 1 in the AP poll for 38 straight weeks (the second-longest streak in the history of AP polling).

== Professional career ==
Saxton was drafted 25th overall in the third round of the 2023 WNBA draft by the Indiana Fever. Saxton and her former Gamecock teammate and #1 pick in the 2023 Draft, Aliyah Boston, both made the 2023 roster. Saxton made her WNBA debut on May 19, 2023, playing 1 minute against the Connecticut Sun.

Saxton was waived by the Fever on February 3, 2025.

== Career statistics ==
Legend
GP	Games played	GS	Games started	MPG	Minutes per game	RPG	Rebounds per game
APG	Assists per game	SPG	Steals per game	BPG	Blocks per game	PPG	Points per game
TO	Turnovers per game	FG%	Field-goal percentage	3P%	3-point field-goal percentage	FT%	Free-throw percentage
**Bold**	Career best	°	League leader

*	Denotes seasons in which Saxton won an NCAA championship

=== WNBA ===
==== Regular season ====
Stats current through end of 2024 regular season

WNBA regular season statistics
Year	Team	GP	GS	MPG	FG%	3P%	FT%	RPG	APG	SPG	BPG	TO	PPG
2023	Indiana	**15**	0	**3.6**	**.333**	**.500**	**.857**	**0.7**	0.0	**0.1**	0.0	0.4	**1.3**
2024	Indiana	9	0	2.6	**.333**	.250	.500	0.3	0.0	0.0	0.0	**0.1**	0.9
**Career**	2 years, 1 team	24	0	3.2	.333	.333	.778	0.5	0.0	0.0	0.0	0.3	1.1

==== Playoffs ====
WNBA playoff statistics
Year	Team	GP	GS	MPG	FG%	3P%	FT%	RPG	APG	SPG	BPG	TO	PPG
2024	Indiana	1	0	2.0	1.000°	—	—	0.0	0.0	0.0	0.0	0.0	2.0
**Career**	1 year, 1 team	1	0	2.0	1.000	—	—	0.0	0.0	0.0	0.0	0.0	2.0

=== College ===
NCAA statistics
Year	Team	GP	GS	MPG	FG%	3P%	FT%	RPG	APG	SPG	BPG	TO	PPG
2018–19	South Carolina	28	1	10.4	.571	—	.581	3.0	0.2	0.5	1.3	**0.7**	4.1
2019–20	South Carolina	33	0	15.4	.570	—	.574	3.9	0.3	0.9	1.3	0.8	5.4
2020–21	South Carolina	31	30	**23.6**	**.573**	—	.628	**5.8**	0.5	**1.2**	**1.5**	1.3	**8.9**
2021–22*	South Carolina	**37**	**37**	21.5	.503	.000	.642	**5.8**	**1.2**	0.7	1.3	1.2	5.8
2022–23	South Carolina	**37**	**37**	16.1	.456	**.500**	**.692**	3.1	0.6	0.5	0.6	0.9	4.9
**Career**		166	105	17.6	.531	.333	.624	4.3	0.6	0.7	1.2	1.0	5.8
