= Naismith Defensive Player of the Year Award =

American college basketball award

- Awarded for: the most outstanding defensive player in college basketball
- Country: United States
- Presented by: Atlanta Tipoff Club

History
- First award: 2018
- Most recent: Rueben Chinyelu, Florida (men); Hannah Hidalgo, Notre Dame (women)
- Website: Official website

The Naismith Defensive Player of the Year Award is an annual basketball award given to the most outstanding defensive player in men's and women's college basketball. It has been awarded by the Atlanta Tipoff Club since 2018 and is named in honor of James Naismith, the inventor of the sport.

== Key ==
| * | Awarded a national player of the year award that same season: Men – Sporting News; Oscar Robertson Trophy; Associated Press; NABC; Naismith; Wooden; Women – Wade; Associated Press; Naismith; Wooden |
| Player (X) | Denotes the number of times the player has been awarded the Naismith Defensive Player of the Year at that point |

== Winners ==
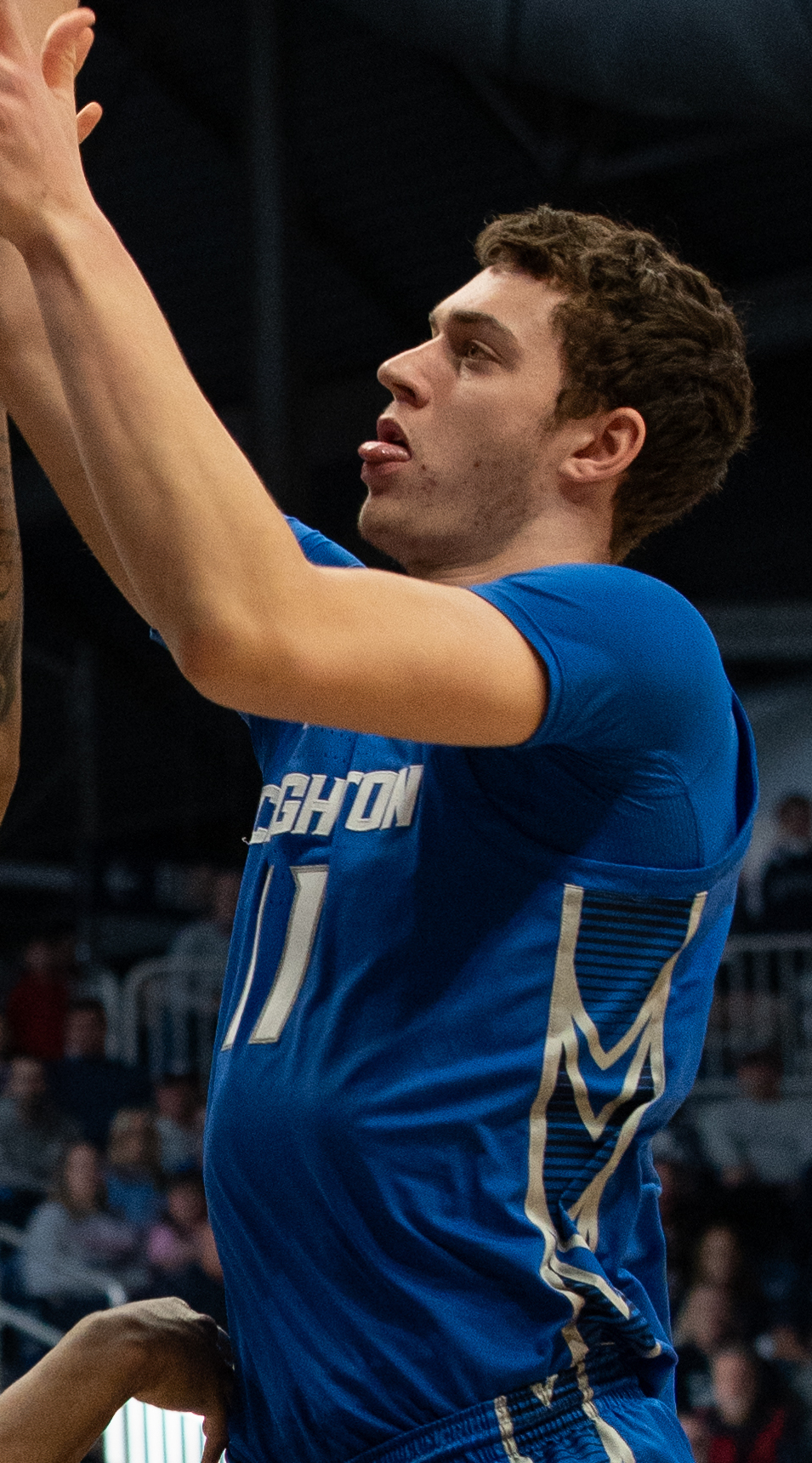
Ryan Kalkbrenner, Creighton, 2025

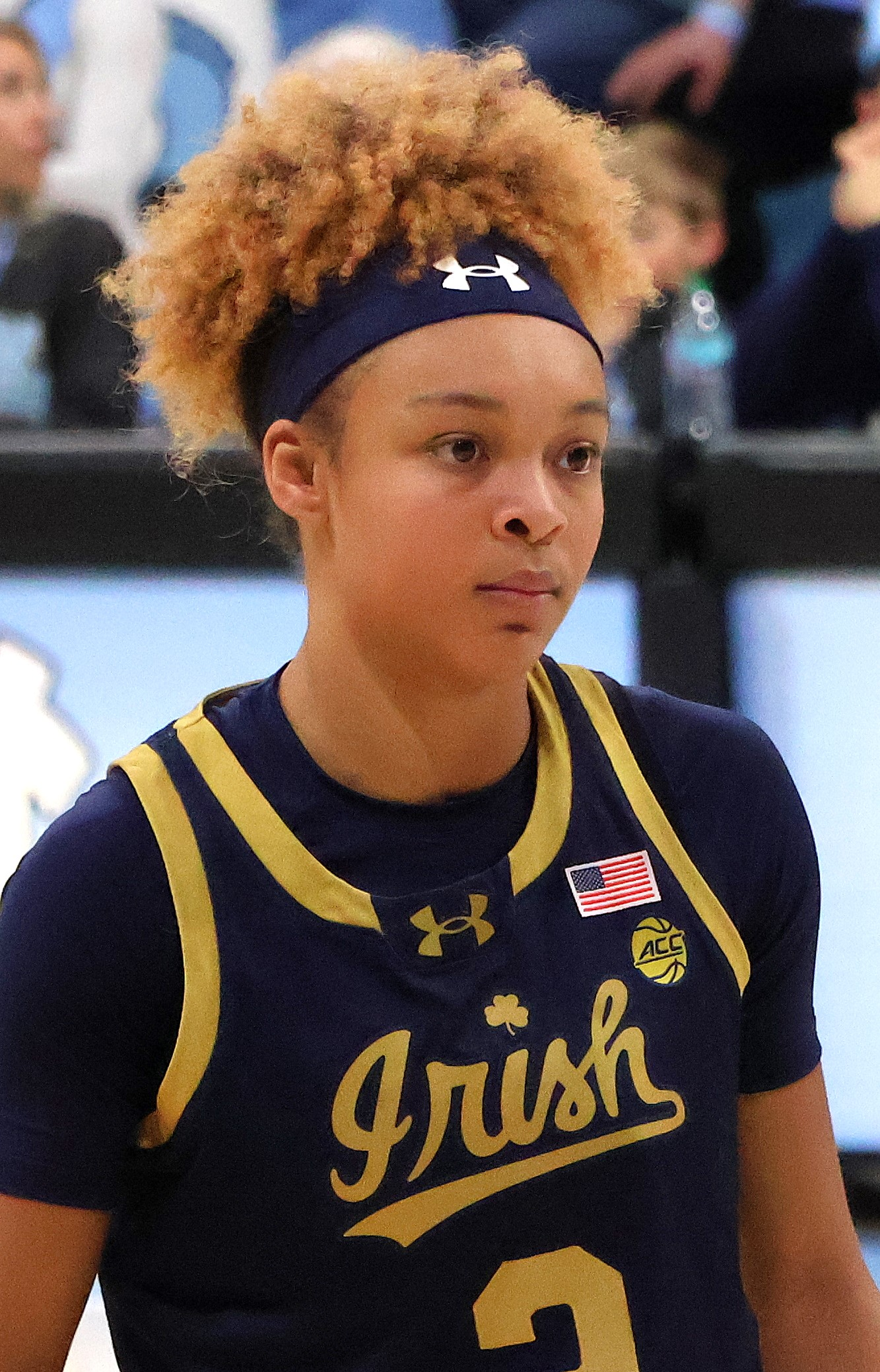
Hannah Hidalgo, Notre Dame, 2026

Men
| Year | Player | School | Position | Class | Reference |
|---|---|---|---|---|---|
| 2017–18 | Jevon Carter | West Virginia | PG | Senior | |
| 2018–19 | Matisse Thybulle | Washington | SG | Senior | |
| 2019–20 | Marcus Garrett | Kansas | SG | Junior | |
| 2020–21 | Davion Mitchell | Baylor | PG | Junior | |
| 2021–22 | Walker Kessler | Auburn | C | Sophomore | |
| 2022–23 | Jaylen Clark | UCLA | SG | Junior | |
| 2023–24 | Jamal Shead | Houston | PG | Senior | |
| 2024–25 | Ryan Kalkbrenner | Creighton | C | Senior | |
| 2025–26 | Rueben Chinyelu | Florida | C | Junior | |

Women
| Year | Player | School | Position | Class | Reference |
|---|---|---|---|---|---|
| 2017–18 | Teaira McCowan | Mississippi State | C | Junior | |
| 2018–19 | Kristine Anigwe | California | PF / C | Senior | |
| 2019–20 | DiDi Richards | Baylor | SG | Junior | |
| 2020–21 | Natasha Mack | Oklahoma State | SF | Senior | |
| 2021–22 | Aliyah Boston* | South Carolina | PF / C | Junior | |
| 2022–23 | Aliyah Boston (2) | South Carolina | PF / C | Senior | |
| 2023–24 | Cameron Brink | Stanford | C | Senior | |
| 2024–25 | Lauren Betts | UCLA | C | Junior | |
| 2025–26 | Hannah Hidalgo | Notre Dame | PG | Junior | |
