= Erica Wheeler =

American basketball player (born 1991)

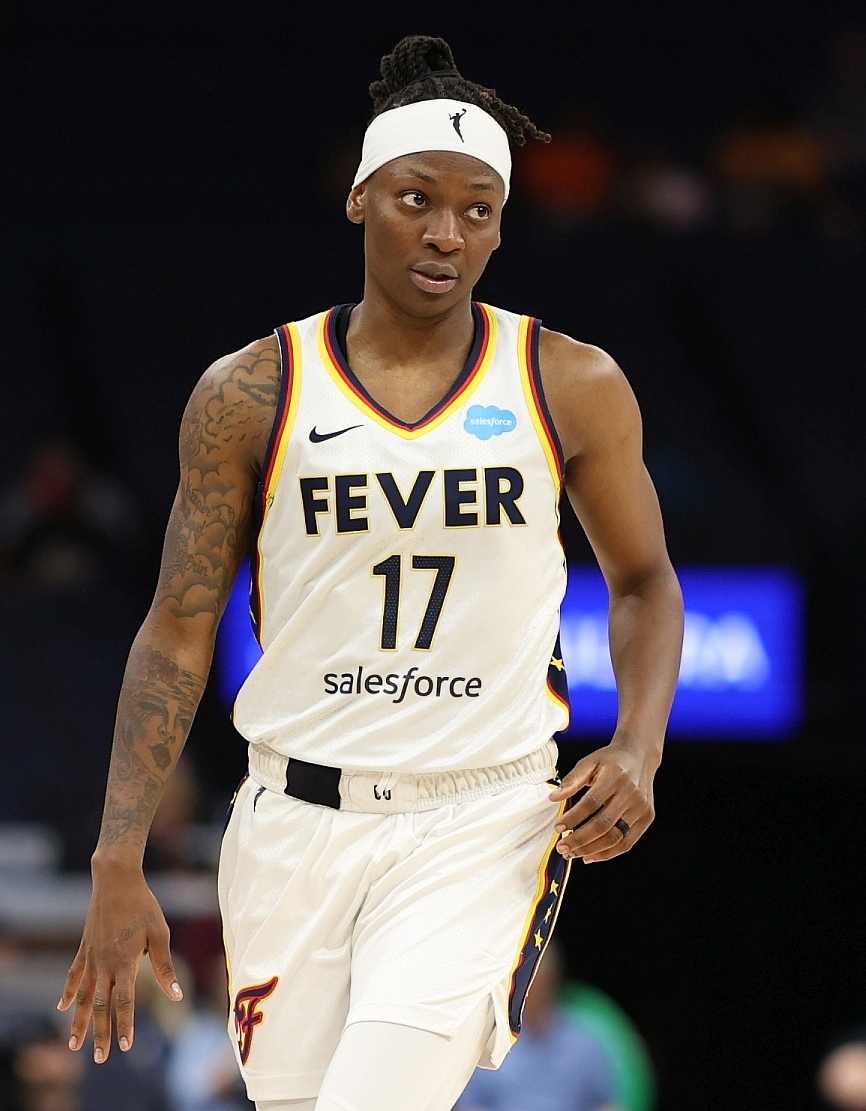
- Wheeler with the Indiana Fever in 2023

No. 17 – Los Angeles Sparks
- Position: Point guard / shooting guard
- League: WNBA

Personal information
- Born: May 2, 1991 (age 35) Miami, Florida, U.S.
- Listed height: 5 ft 7 in (1.70 m)
- Listed weight: 143 lb (65 kg)

Career information
- High school: Parkway Academy (Miramar, Florida)
- College: Rutgers (2009–2013)
- WNBA draft: 2013: undrafted
- Playing career: 2013–present

Career history
- 2013: Leonas de Ponce
- 2013–2014: Mersin Kurtulus
- 2014–2015: Sport Club do Recife
- 2015: Atlanta Dream
- 2015: New York Liberty
- 2015: Atenienses de Manati
- 2015–2016: Sampaio Basquete
- 2016–2019: Indiana Fever
- 2016–2017: Perfumerias Avenida Salamanca
- 2017–2018: Beşiktaş
- 2018–2020: Nadezhda Orenburg
- 2020–2021: İzmit Belediyespor
- 2021: Los Angeles Sparks
- 2021–2024: BC Polkowice
- 2022: Atlanta Dream
- 2023–2024: Indiana Fever
- 2024–2025: Nesibe Aydın GSK
- 2025: Seattle Storm
- 2026–present: Vinyl BC
- 2026–present: Los Angeles Sparks

Career highlights
- WNBA All-Star (2019); WNBA All-Star Game MVP (2019); McDonald's All-American (2009)
- Stats at WNBA.com
- Stats at Basketball Reference

Erica Wheeler (born May 2, 1991) is an American professional basketball player for the Los Angeles Sparks of the Women's National Basketball Association (WNBA) and for the Vinyl of Unrivaled. Wheeler was undrafted out of Rutgers, but eventually made her way into the WNBA in 2015.

== Early life ==
Wheeler grew up in the Miami neighborhood of Liberty City. Liberty City is one of the most crime-ridden inner cities in America, and Wheeler saw two of her close friends die when she was young. Wheeler attended Parkway Academy and was a member of the basketball team there.

== College career ==
Wheeler committed to play at Rutgers in 2009. Rutgers reached the NCAA Tournament in each of her first three seasons. Wheeler contributed as a junior, leading the team in steals, and averaging just under 10 points per game. Prior to her senior year, Wheeler's mother died of cancer. However, Wheeler finished her senior season and graduated from Rutgers.

== Professional career ==
=== WNBA ===
Wheeler earned a tryout in 2015 for the Atlanta Dream after not being selected in the WNBA Draft. Wheeler appeared in 17 games for the Dream in 2015, alongside Angel McCoughtry and Tiffany Hayes, but was eventually cut. Wheeler then moved to the New York Liberty, playing with Tina Charles and Swin Cash. In 2016, Wheeler was signed after training camp by the Indiana Fever and started in 25 games alongside Tamika Catchings. In 2017, Wheeler continued with the Fever and was second on the team in scoring, and led the team in assists. In 2019, Wheeler became the first undrafted player in WNBA history to be named All-Star Game MVP.

Before the start of the 2020 WNBA season, Wheeler tested positive for COVID-19 and developed health complications, including fluid buildup around her heart. She was not cleared to resume playing basketball again until October, missing the entire COVID-shortened 2020 season, which ended October 6.

Before the start of the 2021 WNBA season, Wheeler signed as a free agent with the Los Angeles Sparks to be their new starting point guard alongside Nneka Ogwumike. Then, before the start of the 2022 WNBA season, she signed with the Atlanta Dream for a second stint, playing with rookie Rhyne Howard.

Preceding the start of the 2023 WNBA season, Wheeler signed as a free agent with the Indiana Fever, returning to the franchise for a second stint. During the 2024 WNBA season, Wheeler served as the main backup to rookie Caitlin Clark. Wheeler was originally named as a contestant of the 2024 Skills Challenge at 2024 WNBA All-Star Weekend, but was unable to attend due to the global computer outages delaying her travel. She was replaced by fellow Fever teammate, Kelsey Mitchell.

On February 12, 2025, Wheeler signed with the Seattle Storm.

=== Unrivaled ===
On November 5, 2025, it was announced that Wheeler had been drafted by Vinyl BC for the 2026 Unrivaled season.

=== Overseas ===
After missing the 2020 WNBA season due to COVID, Wheeler signed with Turkey's Izmit Belediyespor and played in 16 games of their 2020–21 season, ranking second on the team with 15.1 points per game. In the winter seasons of 2021/2022, 2022/2023, 2023/2024, she played for BC Polkowice in Poland.

== Career statistics ==
Legend
GP	Games played	GS	Games started	MPG	Minutes per game	RPG	Rebounds per game
APG	Assists per game	SPG	Steals per game	BPG	Blocks per game	PPG	Points per game
TO	Turnovers per game	FG%	Field-goal percentage	3P%	3-point field-goal percentage	FT%	Free-throw percentage
**Bold**	Career best	°	League leader

=== WNBA ===
==== Regular season ====
WNBA regular season statistics
Year	Team	GP	GS	MPG	FG%	3P%	FT%	RPG	APG	SPG	BPG	TO	PPG
2015	Atlanta	17	0	11.9	**.457**	**.400**	.500	.9	1.5	.5	.0	1.2	4.5
2015	New York	3	0	8.7	.385	.000	**1.000**	1.3	.3	1.3	.0	2.0	4.7
2016	Indiana	34	25	23.9	.418	.298	.833	2.1	2.8	.6	.0	2.0	8.4
2017	Indiana	34	26	26.4	.400	.331	.792	3.0	4.1	**1.4**	.0	2.2	11.8
2018	Indiana	34	22	21.7	.351	.276	.797	2.9	4.1	.8	.2	1.4	7.8
2019	Indiana	34	34	25.0	.426	.384	.872	3.0	**5.0**	1.2	.1	2.9	10.1
2020	Did not play (opted out)												
2021	Los Angeles	32	32	**30.2**	.417	.359	.827	**3.1**	4.8	1.3	**.3**	2.7	**13.6**
2022	Atlanta	30	30	26.3	.355	.329	.756	**3.1**	3.9	1.1	.1	2.5	8.4
2023	Indiana	40°	40°	26.8	.398	.309	.878	3.0	**5.0**	1.1	.1	2.1	9.9
2024	Indiana	39	2	14.0	.411	.288	.846	1.4	1.8	.4	.1	**.9**	3.6
2025	Seattle	**44**	24	25.6	.400	.373	.860	2.7	3.3	1.3	.2	1.5	10.3
2026	Los Angeles	43	**41**	26.1	.402	.326	.872	1.9	**5.0**	.9	.1	1.8	9.0
**Career**	11 years, 5 teams	384	276	23.8	.399	.336	.829	2.4	3.8	1.0	.1	1.9	9.0
**Career**	All-Star	1	0	18.8	.529	.538	—	4.0	7.0	1.0	.0	.0	25.0

==== Playoffs ====
WNBA playoff statistics
Year	Team	GP	GS	MPG	FG%	3P%	FT%	RPG	APG	SPG	BPG	TO	PPG
2015	New York	**3**	0	2.7	.333	—	—	.3	.0	.0	.0	.7	.7
2016	Indiana	1	**1**	26.0	**.500**	**1.000**	**1.000**	**3.0**	**3.0**	.0	.0	1.0	10.0
2024	Indiana	2	0	9.5	.000	—	.750	.0	1.5	.0	.0	**.5**	1.5
2025	Seattle	**3**	0	**26.7**	.389	.294	**1.000**	2.0	**3.0**	**1.0**	.0	1.0	**12.3**
**Career**	4 years, 3 teams	9	1	14.8	.391	.368	.900	1.1	1.7	.3	.0	.8	5.8

==== College ====
NCAA statistics
Year	Team	GP	GS	MPG	FG%	3P%	FT%	RPG	APG	SPG	BPG	TO	PPG
2009–10	Rutgers	**34**	4	14.1	.292	.268	**.875**	1.1	.8	.7	**.1**	**1.5**	3.4
2010–11	Rutgers	33	21	30.4	**.380**	**.362**	.711	3.0	1.8	1.7	**.1**	2.2	9.7
2011–12	Rutgers	32	22	28.2	.351	.302	.800	2.8	1.5	1.6	**.1**	2.1	8.6
2012–13	Rutgers	30	**29**	**31.4**	.354	.292	.750	**3.2**	**2.4**	**2.5**	**.1**	2.8	**10.5**
**Career**		129	76	25.8	.352	.314	.770	2.5	1.6	1.6	.1	2.1	8.0

== Off the court ==
=== Philanthropy ===
In February 2024, Wheeler joined the WNBA Changemakers Collective and their collaboration with VOICEINSPORT (VIS) as a mentor, "aimed at keeping girls in sport and developing diverse leaders on the court and beyond the game."
