= 2021–22 South Carolina Gamecocks women's basketball team =

Intercollegiate basketball season

2021–22 South Carolina Gamecocks women's basketball

NCAA tournament national champions Battle 4 Atlantis champions SEC regular-season champions
- Conference: Southeastern Conference

Ranking
- Coaches: No. 1
- AP: No. 1
- Record: 35–2 (15–1 SEC)
- Head coach: Dawn Staley (14th season)
- Assistant coaches: Lisa Boyer; Fred Chmiel; Jolette Law
- Home arena: Colonial Life Arena

2021–22 SEC women's basketball standings
	Conf.				Overall
Team	W		L	PCT	W		L	PCT
No. 1 South Carolina	15	–	1	.938	35	–	2	.946
No. 9 LSU	13	–	3	.813	26	–	6	.813
No. 18 Tennessee	11	–	5	.688	25	–	9	.735
Ole Miss	10	–	6	.625	23	–	9	.719
Florida	10	–	6	.625	21	–	11	.656
Georgia	9	–	7	.563	21	–	10	.677
No. 15 Kentucky †	8	–	8	.500	19	–	12	.613
Missouri	7	–	9	.438	18	–	13	.581
Arkansas	7	–	9	.438	18	–	14	.563
Alabama	6	–	10	.375	20	–	14	.588
Mississippi State	6	–	10	.375	15	–	14	.517
Texas A&M	4	–	12	.250	14	–	15	.483
Vanderbilt	4	–	12	.250	16	–	19	.457
Auburn	2	–	14	.125	10	–	18	.357
† 2022 SEC tournament winner Rankings from AP poll

The 2021–22 South Carolina Gamecocks women's basketball team represented the University of South Carolina during the 2021–22 NCAA Division I women's basketball season. The Gamecocks were led by 14th-year head coach Dawn Staley and played their home games at Colonial Life Arena in Columbia, South Carolina. They competed as members of the Southeastern Conference (SEC). They finished the season 35–2, 15–1 in SEC play, to win the regular season championship. They defeated Arkansas and Ole Miss to advance to the championship of the SEC tournament where they lost to Kentucky. They received an at-large bid to the NCAA tournament as the No. 1 seed in the Greensboro region. They defeated Howard, Miami, North Carolina, Creighton and Louisville to advance to the championship game. There they defeated UConn for the team's second-ever national title.

Aliyah Boston won Player of the Year and Defensive Player of the Year while head coach Dawn Staley was named Naismith Coach of the Year. The Gamecocks were ranked No. 1 in both polls for the entire year, and finished ranked No. 1 in the AP, Coaches, NET, RPI, ELO, SOS and Massey rankings.

== Previous season ==
The Gamecocks finished the season with a 26–5 overall record and a 14–2 record in conference play. The Gamecocks won the SEC tournament. The Gamecocks therefore received an automatic bid to the 2021 NCAA Division I women's basketball tournament, where they reached the Final Four, losing to Stanford 66–65.

== Offseason ==
=== 2021 recruiting class ===
The Gamecocks signed the #1 class for 2021 according to ESPN. their second #1 class in three years.

College recruiting
Name	Hometown	School	Height	Weight	Commit date
Raven Johnson #1 PG	Atlanta, GA	Westlake	5 ft 8 in (1.73 m)	N/A	Jun 25, 2020
Raven Johnson #1 PG	Recruit ratings: ESPN: (98)				
Saniya Rivers #2 G	Wilmington, NC	Eugene Ashley	6 ft 0 in (1.83 m)	N/A	May 30, 2020
Saniya Rivers #2 G	Recruit ratings: ESPN: (98)				
Sania Feagin #1 F	Ellenwood, GA	Forest Park	6 ft 3 in (1.91 m)	N/A	Jun 3, 2020
Sania Feagin #1 F	Recruit ratings: ESPN: (98)				
Bree Hall #5 G	Dayton, OH	Wayne	5 ft 11 in (1.80 m)	N/A	May 25, 2020
Bree Hall #5 G	Recruit ratings: ESPN: (96)				
Overall recruit ranking: ESPN: 1
Note: In many cases, Scout, Rivals, 247Sports, On3, and ESPN may conflict in their listings of height and weight.; In these cases, the average was taken. ESPN grades are on a 100-point scale.; Sources: "2021 South Carolina Gamecocks Player Commits". ESPN. Archived from the original on September 29, 2021.

=== Incoming transfers ===
Name	Number	Pos.	Height	Year	Hometown	Previous school
Kamilla Cardoso	10	C	6'8"	Sophomore	Montes Claros, Brazil	Transferred from Syracuse

== Preseason ==
Hall of Fame coach Dawn Staley entered her fourteenth year at South Carolina, fresh off winning an Olympic gold medal in the 2020 Tokyo Olympics, winning all six games as head coach of Team USA.

South Carolina was named AP preseason #1 for the second straight season, as they return every player from the previous year's Final Four team, added the #1 recruiting class, adding four 5-star recruits, three of which were ranked in the top 5. They also added ACC Freshman of the Year and former 5-star recruit 6'8" Kamillia Cardoso.

=== Award watchlists ===
Award	Player	Position	Year
Nancy Lieberman Award	Destanni Henderson	PG	SR
Ann Meyers Drysdale Award	Zia Cooke	SG	JR
Katrina McClain Award	Sania Feagin	PF	FR
Lisa Leslie Award	Aliyah Boston	C	JR
Lisa Leslie Award	Kamilla Cardoso	C	SO
Wooden Award	Aliyah Boston	C	JR
Wooden Award	Zia Cooke	SG	JR
Wooden Award	Destanni Henderson	PG	SR
Wade Trophy	Aliyah Boston	C	JR
Wade Trophy	Zia Cooke	SG	JR
Naismith Trophy	Aliyah Boston	C	JR
Naismith Trophy	Zia Cooke	SG	JR
Naismith Trophy	Destanni Henderson	PG	SR

=== Preseason All-American teams ===
First team

Aliyah Boston – C

=== SEC coaches poll ===
The SEC coaches selected the Gamecocks to finish in first place in the SEC.

Coaches poll
Predicted finish	Team
1	South Carolina
2	Texas A&M
3	Tennessee
4	Georgia
5	Kentucky
6	Ole Miss
7	Arkansas
8	LSU
9	Mississippi State
10	Missouri
11	Florida
12	Alabama
13	Auburn
14	Vanderbilt

=== SEC media poll ===
SEC media poll
Predicted finish	Team
1	South Carolina
2	Texas A&M
3	Tennessee
4	Georgia
5	Kentucky
6	Ole Miss
7	Arkansas
8	LSU
9	Mississippi State
10	Missouri
11	Florida
12	Alabama
13	Auburn
14	Vanderbilt

=== Preseason All-SEC teams ===
First team

Aliyah Boston – C

Zia Cooke – SG

Second team

Destanni Henderson – PG

== Roster ==
2021–22 South Carolina Gamecocks women's basketball team
Players
Coaches

Pos.	#	Name	Height	Year	Previous school	Hometown
G	0	Olivia Thompson	5 ft 8 in (1.73 m)	Jr	Lexington	Lexington, SC
G	1	Zia Cooke	5 ft 9 in (1.75 m)	Jr	Rogers	Toledo, OH
G	2	Eniya Russell	6 ft 1 in (1.85 m)	So	St. Vincent Pallotti	Baltimore, MD
G	3	Destanni Henderson	5 ft 7 in (1.7 m)	Sr	Fort Myers	Fort Myers, FL
F	4	Aliyah Boston	6 ft 5 in (1.96 m)	Jr	Worcester Academy	Saint Thomas, USVI
F	5	Victaria Saxton	6 ft 2 in (1.88 m)	Sr	Model	Rome, GA
C	10	Kamilla Cardoso	6 ft 7 in (2.01 m)	So	Hamilton Heights; Syracuse	Montes Claros, Brazil
G	11	Destiny Littleton	5 ft 9 in (1.75 m)	RS Sr	The Bishop's School; Texas	La Jolla, CA
G	12	Brea Beal	6 ft 1 in (1.85 m)	Jr	Rock Island	Rock Island, IL
F	15	Laeticia Amihere	6 ft 4 in (1.93 m)	RS Jr	Kings Way Christian	Milton, ON
G	20	Sania Feagin	6 ft 3 in (1.91 m)	Fr	Forest Park	Ellenwood, GA
G	23	Bree Hall	6 ft 0 in (1.83 m)	Fr	Wayne	Dayton, OH
G	24	Lele Grissett	6 ft 2 in (1.88 m)	Sr	Hillside	Durham, NC
G	25	Raven Johnson	5 ft 8 in (1.73 m)	Fr	Westlake	Atlanta, GA
F	32	Elysa Wesolek	6 ft 1 in (1.85 m)	Sr	Northwood	Charleston, SC
G	44	Saniya Rivers	6 ft 1 in (1.85 m)	Fr	Eugene Ashley	Wilmington, NC

Head coach

- Dawn Staley (Virginia)

Assistant coach(es)

- Lisa Boyer (Ithaca)
- Fred Chmiel (Alaska–Anchorage)
- Jolette Law (Iowa)

Legend

- (C) Team captain
- (S) Suspended
- (I) Ineligible
- (W) Walk-on
- Injured
- Current redshirt

Roster
Last update: March 14, 2022

== Starting lineup ==
South Carolina	Position
Aliyah Boston	F
Victoria Saxton	F
Brea Beal	G
Zia Cooke	G
Destanni Henderson	G

== Schedule ==
Date time, TV	Rank^{#}	Opponent^{#}	Result	Record	High points	High rebounds	High assists	Site (attendance) city, state
Exhibition
November 1, 2021*; 7:00 p.m.	No. 1	Benedict	W 98–41	–	18 – Cardoso	13 – Cardoso	7 – tied	Colonial Life Arena; Columbia, SC
Regular season
November 9, 2021*; 5:00 p.m., ESPN	No. 1	at No. 5 NC State	W 66–57	1–0	17 – Cooke	6 – Boston	5 – Henderson	Reynolds Coliseum (5,533); Raleigh, NC
November 12, 2021*; 3:30 p.m., ESPNEWS	No. 1	vs. South Dakota; The Invitational	W 72–41	2–0	15 – Henderson	8 – tied	5 – Henderson	Sanford Pentagon (2,845); Sioux Falls, SD
November 17, 2021*; 7:00 p.m., SECN+	No. 1	Clemson rivalry	W 76–45	3–0	16 – Henderson	6 – tied	6 – Henderson	Colonial Life Arena (13,363); Columbia, SC
November 20, 2021*; 7:30 p.m.	No. 1	vs. Buffalo; Bad Boys Mowers Battle 4 Atlantis quarterfinal	W 88–60	4–0	23 – Boston	10 – Cardoso	8 – Henderson	Imperial Arena (667); Paradise Island, Bahamas
November 21, 2021*; 2:30 p.m.	No. 1	vs. No. 9 Oregon; Bad Boys Mowers Battle 4 Atlantis semifinal	W 80–63	5–0	20 – Cooke	8 – Boston	5 – Cooke	Imperial Arena; Paradise Island, Nassau, Bahamas
November 22, 2021*; 12:00 p.m., ESPN	No. 1	vs. No. 2 UConn; Bad Boys Mowers Battle 4 Atlantis championship	W 73–57	6–0	23 – Boston	15 – Boston	6 – Henderson	Imperial Arena (1,171); Paradise Island, Bahamas
November 26, 2021*; 3:00 p.m., SECN+	No. 1	Elon	W 79–38	7–0	12 – Boston	8 – Beal	3 – tied	Colonial Life Arena (11,360); Columbia, SC
November 29, 2021*; 7:00 p.m., SECN	No. 1	North Carolina A&T	W 79–42	8–0	29 – Boston	14 – Boston	4 – Saxton	Colonial Life Arena (12,020); Columbia, SC
December 3, 2021*; 7:00 p.m., SECN+	No. 1	Kansas State; Big 12/SEC Challenge	W 65–44	9–0	21 – Boston	17 – Boston	7 – Amihere	Colonial Life Arena (11,657); Columbia, SC
December 12, 2021*; 3:00 p.m., ESPN	No. 1	No. 8 Maryland; Women's Jimmy V Classic	W 66–59	10–0	20 – Cooke	16 – Boston	2 – tied	Colonial Life Arena (12,862); Columbia, SC
December 15, 2021*; 7:00 p.m., ACCN	No. 1	at No. 15 Duke	W 55–46	11–0	19 – Boston	14 – Boston	3 – Amihere	Cameron Indoor Stadium (5,451); Durham, NC
December 21, 2021*; 7:00 p.m., ESPN2	No. 1	No. 2 Stanford	W 65–61	12–0	18 – Boston	11 – Boston	7 – Henderson	Colonial Life Arena (13,070); Columbia, SC
December 30, 2021; 7:00 p.m., SECN	No. 1	at Missouri	L 69–70 ^{OT}	12–1 (0–1)	17 – Boston	12 – Boston	7 – Henderson	Mizzou Arena (6,139); Columbia, MO
January 2, 2022; 6:00 p.m., SECN+	No. 1	Mississippi State	W 80–68	13–1 (1–1)	18 – Cooke	14 – Henderson	8 – Henderson	Colonial Life Arena (11,403); Columbia, SC
January 6, 2022; 8:00 p.m., SECN+	No. 1	at No. 13 LSU	W 66–60	14–1 (2–1)	19 – Boston	18 – Boston	3 – Cooke	Pete Maravich Assembly Center (9,190); Baton Rouge, LA
January 9, 2022; 1:00 p.m., ESPN	No. 1	No. 21 Kentucky	W 74–54	15–1 (3–1)	19 – Cooke	15 – Boston	4 – Henderson	Colonial Life Arena (12,327); Columbia, SC
January 13, 2022; 7:00 p.m., SECN	No. 1	Texas A&M	W 65–45	16–1 (4–1)	19 – Boston	15 – Boston	2 – tied	Colonial Life Arena (12,169); Columbia, SC
January 16, 2022; 3:00 p.m., ESPN2	No. 1	at Arkansas	W 61–52	17–1 (5–1)	19 – tied	13 – Boston	3 – Henderson	Bud Walton Arena (4,265); Fayetteville, AR
January 24, 2022; 7:00 p.m., SECN	No. 1	Vanderbilt	W 85–30	18–1 (6–1)	14 – Grissett	12 – Boston	4 – tied	Colonial Life Arena (11,329); Columbia, SC
January 27, 2022; 6:00 p.m., ESPN	No. 1	No. 24 Ole Miss	W 69–40	19–1 (7–1)	22 – Boston	12 – Boston	2 – Saxton	Colonial Life Arena (13,973); Columbia, SC
January 30, 2022; 12:00 p.m., SECN	No. 1	at Florida	W 62–50	20–1 (8–1)	13 – Boston	19 – Boston	5 – Henderson	O'Connell Center (5,319); Gainesville, FL
February 3, 2022; 7:00 p.m., SECN+	No. 1	Alabama	W 83–51	21–1 (9–1)	20 – Boston	10 – Boston	4 – tied	Colonial Life Arena (11,875); Columbia, SC
February 10, 2022; 7:00 p.m., ESPN	No. 1	at Kentucky	W 59–50	22–1 (10–1)	14 – Boston	15 – Boston	5 – Henderson	Memorial Coliseum (4,317); Lexington, KY
February 13, 2022; 12:00 p.m., ESPN2	No. 1	at No. 17 Georgia	W 72–54	23–1 (11–1)	18 – Boston	12 – Boston	5 – Cooke	Stegeman Coliseum (5,461); Athens, GA
February 17, 2022; 7:00 p.m., SECN	No. 1	Auburn	W 75–38	24–1 (12–1)	20 – Cooke	12 – Boston	5 – Rivers	Colonial Life Arena (12,574); Columbia, SC
February 20, 2022; 1:00 p.m., ABC	No. 1	No. 12 Tennessee; College GameDay	W 67–53	25–1 (13–1)	16 – Boston	13 – Boston	5 – Henderson	Colonial Life Arena (18,000); Columbia, SC
February 24, 2022; 8:30 p.m., SECN	No. 1	at Texas A&M	W 89–48	26–1 (14–1)	18 – Boston	10 – Boston	5 – Saxton	Reed Arena (5,883); College Station, TX
February 27, 2022; 2:00 p.m., SECN	No. 1	at Ole Miss	W 71–57	27–1 (15–1)	23 – Henderson	14 – Boston	8 – Henderson	SJB Pavilion (3,221); Oxford, MS
SEC tournament
March 4, 2022; 12:00 p.m., SECN	(1) No. 1	vs. (8) Arkansas; Quarterfinals	W 76–54	28–1	17 – Boston	14 – Boston	5 – Boston	Bridgestone Arena (6,880); Nashville, TN
March 5, 2022; 5:00 p.m., ESPNU	(1) No. 1	vs. (4) Ole Miss; Semifinals	W 61–51	29–1	15 – Boston	12 – Boston	5 – Henderson	Bridgestone Arena; Nashville, TN
March 6, 2022; 2:00 p.m., ESPN	(1) No. 1	vs. (7) Kentucky; Championship	L 62–64	29–2	21 – Boston	11 – Boston	5 – Henderson	Bridgestone Arena; Nashville, TN
NCAA tournament
March 18, 2022; 2:00 p.m., ESPN	(1 G) No. 1	(16 G) Howard; First round	W 79–21	30–2	10 – tied	13 – Saxton	– tied	Colonial Life Arena (8,478); Columbia, SC
March 20, 2022; 3:00 p.m., ABC	(1 G) No. 1	(8 G) Miami; Second round	W 49–33	31–2	11 – Cardoso	16 – Boston	4 – Boston	Colonial Life Arena (9,817); Columbia, SC
March 25, 2022; 7:00 p.m., ESPN	(1 G) No. 1	vs. (5 G) No. 17 North Carolina; Sweet Sixteen	W 69−61	32–2	28 – Boston	22 – Boston	4 – Beal	Greensboro Coliseum (8,811); Greensboro, NC
March 27, 2022; 7:00 p.m., ESPN	(1 G) No. 1	vs. (10 G) Creighton; Elite Eight	W 80–50	33–2	19 – Boston	11 – Saxton	3 – Henderson	Greensboro Coliseum (6,579); Greensboro, NC
April 1, 2022; 7:00 p.m., ESPN	(1 G) No. 1	vs. (1 W) No. 4 Louisville; Final Four	W 72–59	34–2	23 – Boston	18 – Boston	4 – tied	Target Center; Minneapolis, MN
April 3, 2022; 8:00 p.m., ESPN	(1 G) No. 1	vs. (2 B) No. 5 UConn; National championship	W 64–49	35–2	26 – Henderson	16 – Boston	4 – Henderson	Target Center (18,304); Minneapolis, MN
*Non-conference game. ^{#}Rankings from AP poll. (#) Tournament seedings in parentheses. All times are in Eastern.

== Statistics ==
=== Team total per game ===
Team	PTS	FGM	FGA	FG%	3PM	3PA	3P%	FTM	FTA	FT%	REB	AST	STL	BLK	ATT
Gamecocks	2623	975	2289	42.6%	179	585	30.6%	494	731	67.6%	1771	515	239	273	196,286
Opponents	1875	728	2191	33.2%	138	518	26.6%	281	427	65.8%	1117	335	229	153	54,779

=== Team average per game ===
Team	PPG	FG	FG%	3P	3P%	FT	FT%	REB	AST	STL	BLK	ATT
Gamecocks	70.9	26.4	42.6%	4.8	30.6%	13.4	67.6%	47.9	13.9	6.5	7.4	12,268
Opponents	50.7	19.7	33.2%	3.7	26.6%	7.6	65.8%	30.2	9.1	6.2	4.1	5,478

=== Individual total per game ===
Player	GP	MP	PTS	FGM	FGA	FG%	3M	3A	3P%	FTM	FTA	FT%	ORB	DRB	REB	AST	TO	STL	BLK
Aliyah Boston	37	1056	623	239	441	54.2%	14	48	29.2%	131	170	77.1%	150	312	462	75	57	45	90
Destanni Henderson	34	1053	392	144	357	40.3%	55	138	39.9%	49	68	72.1%	23	84	107	133	72	46	4
Zia; Cooke	36	982	385	139	406	34.2%	45	157	28.7%	62	88	70.5%	15	61	76	60	76	22	2
Laeticia Amihere	31	520	195	68	156	43.6%	5	11	45.5%	54	83	65.1%	45	68	113	37	57	19	25
Victaria Saxton	37	794	215	86	171	50.3%	0	1	0.0%	43	67	64.2%	118	98	216	43	44	26	48
Kamilla Cardoso	32	428	174	68	123	55.3%	0	0	0.0%	38	53	71.7%	61	103	164	31	39	11	46
Brea; Beal	37	890	187	72	189	38.1%	15	63	23.8%	28	47	59.6%	65	121	186	47	38	26	20
LeLe; Grissett	25	308	81	30	71	42.3%	1	1	100%	20	40	50.0%	29	21	50	14	19	7	8
Bree; Hall	30	328	97	32	102	31.4%	14	46	30.4%	19	30	63.3%	12	41	53	1	23	5	1
Destiny Littleton	31	281	80	25	70	35.7%	21	61	34.4%	9	12	75.0%	6	33	39	7	15	9	2
Saniya Rivers	27	348	61	24	98	24.5%	1	31	3.2%	12	24	50.0%	5	38	43	38	27	13	13
Eniya; Russell	23	176	53	19	45	42.2%	5	12	41.7%	10	17	58.8%	5	25	30	19	16	4	2
Sania; Feagin	31	133	58	21	34	61.8%	0	0	0.0%	16	28	57.1%	14	31	45	6	18	5	12
Olivia Thompson	13	41	9	3	13	23.1%	3	13	23.1%	0	0	0.0%	0	2	2	0	0	1	0
Elysa Wesolek	21	78	13	5	12	41.7%	0	3	0.0%	3	4	75.0%	4	9	13	4	7	0	0
Raven Johnson	2	9	1	0	1	0.0%	0	0	0.0%	0	0	0.0%	0	1	1	0	1	0	0

=== Individual average per game ===
Player	GP	MIN	FG%	3P%	FT%	OREB	DREB	REB	AST	STL	BLK	PPG
Aliyah Boston	37	28.5	54.2%	29.2%	77.1%	4.1	8.4	12.5	2.0	1.2	2.4	16.8
Destanni Henderson	34	31.0	40.3%	39.9%	72.1%	0.7	2.5	3.1	3.9	1.4	0.1	11.5
Zia Cooke	36	27.3	34.2%	28.7%	70.5%	0.4	1.7	2.1	1.7	0.6	0.1	10.7
Laeticia Amihere	31	16.8	43.6%	45.5%	65.1%	1.5	2.2	3.6	1.2	0.6	0.8	6.3
Victoria Saxton	37	21.5	50.3%	0.0%	64.2%	3.2	2.6	5.8	1.2	0.7	1.3	5.8
Kamilla Cardoso	32	13.4	55.3%	0.0%	71.7%	1.9	3.2	5.1	1.0	0.3	1.4	5.4
Brea Beal	37	24.1	38.1%	23.8%	59.6%	1.8	3.3	5.0	1.3	0.7	0.5	5.1
LeLe Grissett	25	12.3	42.3%	100%	50.0%	1.2	0.8	2.0	0.6	0.3	0.3	3.2
Bree Hall	36	9.1	31.4%	30.4%	63.3%	0.3	1.1	1.5	0.0	0.1	0.0	2.7
Destiny Littleton	31	9.1	35.7%	34.4%	75.0%	0.2	1.1	1.3	0.2	0.3	0.1	2.6
Saniya Rivers	27	12.9	24.5%	0.32%	50.0%	0.2	1.4	1.6	1.4	0.5	0.5	2.3
Eniya Russell	23	7.7	42.2%	41.7%	58.8%	0.2	1.1	1.3	0.8	0.2	0.1	2.3
Sania Feagin	31	4.3	61.8%	0.0%	57.1%	0.5	1.0	1.5	0.2	0.2	0.4	1.9
Olivia Thompson	13	3.7	23.1%	23.1%	0.0%	0.0	0.2	0.2	0.0	0.1	0.0	0.7
Elysa Wesolek	21	3.4	41.7%	0.0%	75.0%	0.2	0.4	0.6	0.2	0.0	0.0	0.6
Raven Johnson	2	4.5	0.0%	0.0%	0.0%	0.0	0.5	0.5	0.0	0.0	0.0	0.0

== Rankings ==
Regular-season polls
Poll	Pre- Season	Week 2	Week 3	Week 4	Week 5	Week 6	Week 7	Week 8	Week 9	Week 10	Week 11	Week 12	Week 13	Week 14	Week 15	Week 16	Week 17	Week 18	Week 19	Final
AP	1 (14)	1 (25)	1 (30)	1 (30)	1 (30)	1 (30)	1 (29)	1 (30)	1 (22)	1 (26)	1 (28)	1 (29)	1 (29)	1 (30)	1 (30)	1 (30)	1 (30)	1 (17)	1 (20)	1 (20)
Coaches	1 (13)	1 (13)	1 (31)	1 (32)	1 (32)	1 (32)	1 (31)	1 (32)	1 (16)	1 (24)	1 (26)	1 (31)	1 (31)	1 (31)	1 (31)	1 (31)	1 (31)	1 (19)	1 (27)	1 (30)

Legend
	Increase in ranking
	Decrease in ranking
	Not ranked previous week
RV	Received votes
NR	Not ranked
( )	Number of first-place votes

== Awards and honors ==
- Aliyah Boston
  - Naismith Player of the Year
  - United States Basketball Writers Association Player of the Year
  - Wade Trophy
  - John R. Wooden Award
  - Ann Meyers Drysdale Women's Player of the Year
  - Associated Press Player of the Year
  - Naismith Women's Defensive Player of the Year
  - NCAA basketball tournament Most Outstanding Player
  - Lisa Leslie Award
  - Academic All-American of the Year
  - Associated Press first-team All-American
  - United States Basketball Writers Association first-team All-American
  - Women's Basketball Coaches Association All-American
  - SEC Player of the Year
  - First-team All-SEC
  - SEC Defensive Player of the Year
  - SEC All-Defensive Team
- Destanni Henderson
  - United States Basketball Writers Association third-team All-American
  - First-team All-SEC
- Zia Cooke
  - Second-team All-SEC
- Dawn Staley
  - Naismith College Coach of the Year
  - WBCA National Coach of the Year Award
  - USBWA Women's National Coach of the Year
  - SEC Coach of the Year

== See also ==
- 2021–22 South Carolina Gamecocks men's basketball team
