= 2024 Indiana Fever season =

- Head coach: Christie Sides
- Arena: Gainbridge Fieldhouse

Results
- Record: 20–20 (.500)
- Place: 3rd (Eastern)
- Playoff finish: 6th seed, Lost in First Round 0–2 to Connecticut Sun

The 2024 Indiana Fever season was the franchise's 25th season in the WNBA, and their second season under head coach Christie Sides. The regular season tipped off against the Connecticut Sun in Connecticut on Tuesday, May 14, 2024.

The Fever won the 2024 WNBA draft Lottery and were awarded the first overall pick for the second year in a row; they used it to select Caitlin Clark. The number one pick did not lead to a fast start to the season as the Fever lost their first five games, the closest of which was a two-point loss to Seattle on May 22. The Fever would win their next game against Los Angeles to earn their first win of the season. They would go on to lose their next three games, including a rematch against Los Angeles to finish the opening month 1–8. June brought about a vast improvement from the team. They defeated Chicago by one point to open the month. They lost to New York, defeated Washington, and then lost to Connecticut before going on a four-game winning streak. They would lose their next two games before winning the final game of June to finish the month with a 7–4 record. The Fever went 1–2 to start July but defeated New York. They defeated Phoenix and Minnesota before losing to Dallas. The team finished July 3–3 and headed into the Olympic break with an 11–15 record.

The Fever returned from the Olympic break and won their first two games of August. They lost in Minnesota by ten-points before winning their next three games. The highlight of August was a nineteen-point victory over Chicago. The team finished 5–1 during the month, and moved solidly into playoff position. They won their first two games of September and on September 3, 2024, the Fever clinched their spot in the 2024 WNBA Playoffs, ending their seven-year playoff drought (the longest in WNBA history). They would go on to lose three of the next four games, including back-to-back losses to Las Vegas. They defeated Dallas by one point and lost to Washington by one point to finish September 4–4.

The Fever finished the season 20–20, which was sixth place overall. They faced off in the First Round against third seed Connecticut. They were swept in the series two games to zero, losing the first game 69–93 and the second game 81–87. Despite the sweep, the Fever made great strides, posting their highest regular season win total since 2015. Clark was named to the All-WNBA First Team, and was only the fifth rookie in WNBA history to be named to the team.

For the 2024 WNBA season, the Fever set a new single-season record record with 340,715 fans for total home attendance for a WNBA team.

In August 2024, the WNBA announced that the Fever would host 2025 WNBA All-Star Game and related events in July 2025 for the first time in franchise history.

== Transactions ==
=== WNBA draft ===
Round	Pick	Player	Nationality	School/Team/Country
1	1	Caitlin Clark	United States	Iowa
2	15	Celeste Taylor	United States	Ohio State
3	27	Leilani Correa	United States	Florida

=== Transactions ===
Date	Transaction
January 11, 2024	Extended Qualifying Offers to Maya Caldwell and Temi Fagbenle
January 19, 2024	Signed Temi Fagbenle to a Training Camp Contract.
January 29, 2024	Signed Maya Caldwell to a Training Camp Contract.
February 1, 2024	Signed Damiris Dantas
February 1, 2024	Signed Katie Lou Samuelson
March 21, 2024	Waived Victoria Vivians
April 22, 2024	Exercised fourth-year option for NaLyssa Smith
April 25, 2024	Signed Celeste Taylor and Leilani Correa to Rookie Contracts
April 27, 2024	Signed Caitlin Clark to a Rookie Contract
May 10, 2024	Exercised fourth-year option for Lexie Hull and Kristy Wallace
May 10, 2024	Waived Maya Caldwell and Leilani Correa
May 13, 2024	Suspended the contract of Damiris Dantas (temporary, due to knee injury)
June 25, 2024	Activated Damiris Dantas
June 25, 2024	Waived Celeste Taylor
September 23, 2024	Kelly Krauskopf hired as President of Basketball and Business Operations (starting post 2024 season)

=== Roster changes ===
==== Additions ====
Personnel	Signed/Trade	Former team
Caitlin Clark	Draft	Iowa
Leilani Correa	Draft	Florida
Damiris Dantas	Signed	Minnesota Lynx
Temi Fagbenle	Signed	Minnesota Lynx
Katie Lou Samuelson	Signed	Los Angeles Sparks
Celeste Taylor	Draft	Ohio State

==== Subtractions ====
Personnel	Reason	New team
Maya Caldwell	Waived	Atlanta Dream
Leilani Correa	Waived	—
Emma Cannon	Free Agency	Dallas Wings / Las Vegas Aces
Victoria Vivians	Waived	Seattle Storm
Amanda Zahui B.	Waived	Townsville Fire
Celeste Taylor	Waived	Phoenix Mercury / Connecticut Sun

== Roster ==
2024 Indiana Fever roster
Players
Coaches

Pos.	No.	Nat.	Name	Height	Weight	DOB	From	Yrs
G	34	(United States)	Berger, Grace	6' 0" (1.83m)	160 lb (73kg)	1999-06-03	Indiana	1
F/C	7	(United States)	Boston, Aliyah	6' 5" (1.96m)	220 lb (100kg)	2001-12-11	South Carolina	1
G	22	(United States)	Clark, Caitlin	6' 0" (1.83m)	155 lb (70kg)	2002-01-22	Iowa	R
F	12	(Brazil)	Dantas, Damiris	6' 3" (1.91m)	214 lb (97kg)	1992-11-17	Real Celta Vigo	8
C	14	(United Kingdom)	Fagbenle, Temi	6' 4" (1.93m)	180 lb (82kg)	1992-09-08	USC	3
G	10	(United States)	Hull, Lexie	6' 1" (1.85m)	155 lb (70kg)	1999-09-13	Stanford	2
G	0	(United States)	Mitchell, Kelsey	5' 8" (1.73m)	160 lb (73kg)	1995-11-12	Ohio State	6
F	33	(United States)	Samuelson, Katie Lou	6' 3" (1.91m)	163 lb (74kg)	1997-06-13	Connecticut	4
F	5	(United States)	Saxton, Victaria	6' 2" (1.88m)	181 lb (82kg)	1999-11-10	South Carolina	1
F	1	(United States)	Smith, NaLyssa	6' 4" (1.93m)	185 lb (84kg)	2000-08-08	Baylor	2
G	3	(Australia)	Wallace, Kristy	5' 11" (1.8m)	157 lb (71kg)	1996-01-03	Baylor	2
G	17	(United States)	Wheeler, Erica	5' 7" (1.7m)	143 lb (65kg)	1991-05-02	Rutgers	8

Head coach
(United States) Christie Sides (Louisiana Tech)
Assistant coaches
(United States) Karima Christmas-Kelly (Duke)
(United States) Jessie Miller (UIC)
(United States) Paul Miller (Lake Forest College)
Athletic trainer
(United States) Garrett Hueber
Strength and conditioning coach
(United States) Shannon Patterson

Legend

- (C) Team captain
- (DP) Unsigned draft pick
- (FA) Free agent
- (S) Suspended
- Injured

=== Depth ===
Pos.	Starter	Bench
PG	Caitlin Clark	Erica Wheeler; Grace Berger
SG	Kelsey Mitchell	Kristy Wallace
SF	Lexie Hull	Katie Lou Samuelson
PF	NaLyssa Smith	Temi Fagbenle; Victaria Saxton
C	Aliyah Boston	Damiris Dantas

== Schedule ==
=== Pre-season ===
2024 pre-season game log
Total: 1–1 (Home: 1–0; Road: 0–1)
May: 1–1 (Home: 1–0; Road: 0–1)

Game	Date	Team	Score	High points	High rebounds	High assists	Location Attendance	Record
1	May 3	@ Dallas	L 76–79	Caitlin Clark (21)	Aliyah Boston (8)	Erica Wheeler (4)	College Park Center; 6,251	0–1
2	May 9	Atlanta	W 83–80	NaLyssa Smith (21)	Caitlin Clark (8)	Grace Berger (7)	Gainbridge Fieldhouse; 13,028	1-1

2024 pre-season schedule

=== Regular season ===
2024 game log
Total: 20–20 (Home: 12–8; Road: 8–12)
May: 1–8 (Home: 0–4; Road: 1–4)

Game	Date	Team	Score	High points	High rebounds	High assists	Location Attendance	Record
1	May 14	@ Connecticut	L 71–92	Caitlin Clark (20)	NaLyssa Smith (9)	Clark, Samuelson (3)	Mohegan Sun Arena; 8,910	0–1
2	May 16	New York	L 66–102	Aliyah Boston (12)	Boston, Clark (7)	Caitlin Clark (6)	Gainbridge Fieldhouse; 17,274	0–2
3	May 18	@ New York	L 80–91	Caitlin Clark (22)	NaLyssa Smith (8)	Caitlin Clark (8)	Barclays Center; 17,735	0–3
4	May 20	Connecticut	L 84–88	Clark, Mitchell (17)	Temi Fagbenle (10)	Clark, Mitchell (5)	Gainbridge Fieldhouse; 17,274	0–4
5	May 22	@ Seattle	L 83–85	Caitlin Clark (21)	NaLyssa Smith (11)	Caitlin Clark (7)	Climate Pledge Arena; 18,343	0–5
6	May 24	@ Los Angeles	W 78–73	Kelsey Mitchell (18)	Caitlin Clark (10)	Caitlin Clark (8)	Crypto.com Arena; 19,103	1–5
7	May 25	@ Las Vegas	L 80–99	Kelsey Mitchell (16)	Temi Fagbenle (8)	Caitlin Clark (7)	Michelob Ultra Arena; 10,399	1–6
8	May 28	Los Angeles	L 82–88	Caitlin Clark (30)	Temi Fagbenle (7)	Caitlin Clark (6)	Gainbridge Fieldhouse; 16,013	1–7
9	May 30	Seattle	L 88–103	NaLyssa Smith (23)	Aliyah Boston (12)	Caitlin Clark (9)	Gainbridge Fieldhouse; 15,022	1–8

June : 7–4 (Home: 4–0; Road: 3–4)

Game	Date	Team	Score	High points	High rebounds	High assists	Location Attendance	Record
10	June 1	Chicago	W 71–70	Kelsey Mitchell (18)	NaLyssa Smith (9)	Caitlin Clark (6)	Gainbridge Fieldhouse; 17,274	2–8
11	June 2	@ New York	L 68–104	Kelsey Mitchell (21)	NaLyssa Smith (8)	Caitlin Clark (5)	Barclays Center; 17,401	2–9
12	June 7	@ Washington	W 85–83	Caitlin Clark (30)	NaLyssa Smith (10)	Caitlin Clark (6)	Capital One Arena; 20,333	3–9
13	June 10	@ Connecticut	L 72–89	Aliyah Boston (14)	Aliyah Boston (12)	Aliyah Boston (5)	Mohegan Sun Arena; 8,910	3–10
14	June 13	Atlanta	W 91–84	Aliyah Boston (27)	Aliyah Boston (13)	Caitlin Clark (6)	Gainbridge Fieldhouse; 16,651	4–10
15	June 16	Chicago	W 91–83	Caitlin Clark (23)	Aliyah Boston (14)	Caitlin Clark (9)	Gainbridge Fieldhouse; 17,274	5–10
16	June 19	Washington	W 88–81	Boston, Mitchell (22)	Caitlin Clark (12)	Caitlin Clark (6)	Gainbridge Fieldhouse; 17,274	6–10
17	June 21	@ Atlanta	W 91–79	NaLyssa Smith (21)	Aliyah Boston (10)	Caitlin Clark (7)	State Farm Arena; 17,575	7–10
18	June 23	@ Chicago	L 87–88	Kelsey Mitchell (24)	Boston, Smith (7)	Caitlin Clark (13)	Wintrust Arena; 9,872	7–11
19	June 27	@ Seattle	L 77–89	Clark, Wheeler (15)	Aliyah Boston (14)	Caitlin Clark (7)	Climate Pledge Arena; 18,343	7–12
20	June 30	@ Phoenix	W 88–82	Aliyah Boston (17)	NaLyssa Smith (15)	Caitlin Clark (12)	Footprint Center; 17,071	8–12

July : 3–3 (Home: 2–1; Road: 1–2)

Game	Date	Team	Score	High points	High rebounds	High assists	Location Attendance	Record
21	July 2	@ Las Vegas	L 69–88	Kelsey Mitchell (23)	NaLyssa Smith (14)	Caitlin Clark (11)	T-Mobile Arena; 20,366	8–13
22	July 6	New York	W 83–78	Caitlin Clark (19)	Caitlin Clark (12)	Caitlin Clark (13)	Gainbridge Fieldhouse; 17,274	9–13
23	July 10	Washington	L 84–89	Caitlin Clark (29)	Katie Lou Samuelson (9)	Caitlin Clark (13)	Gainbridge Fieldhouse; 17,274	9–14
24	July 12	Phoenix	W 95–86	Kelsey Mitchell (28)	Aliyah Boston (13)	Caitlin Clark (13)	Gainbridge Fieldhouse; 17,274	10–14
25	July 14	@ Minnesota	W 81–74	Kelsey Mitchell (21)	Aliyah Boston (16)	Caitlin Clark (6)	Target Center; 18,978	11–14
26	July 17	@ Dallas	L 93–101	Aliyah Boston (28)	NaLyssa Smith (12)	Caitlin Clark (19)	College Park Center; 6,251	11–15

August : 5–1 (Home: 3–0; Road: 2–1)

Game	Date	Team	Score	High points	High rebounds	High assists	Location Attendance	Record
27	August 16	Phoenix	W 98–89	Caitlin Clark (29)	Boston, Smith (9)	Caitlin Clark (10)	Gainbridge Fieldhouse; 17,274	12–15
28	August 18	Seattle	W 92–75	Kelsey Mitchell (27)	Aliyah Boston (15)	Caitlin Clark (9)	Gainbridge Fieldhouse; 17,274	13–15
29	August 24	@ Minnesota	L 80–90	Caitlin Clark (23)	Aliyah Boston (15)	Caitlin Clark (8)	Target Center; 19,023	13–16
30	August 26	@ Atlanta	W 84–79	Kelsey Mitchell (29)	Aliyah Boston (11)	Caitlin Clark (7)	State Farm Arena; 17,608	14–16
31	August 28	Connecticut	W 84–80	Kelsey Mitchell (23)	Lexie Hull (8)	Aliyah Boston (8)	Gainbridge Fieldhouse; 17,274	15–16
32	August 30	@ Chicago	W 100–81	Caitlin Clark (31)	NaLyssa Smith (7)	Caitlin Clark (12)	Wintrust Arena; 9,445	16–16

September : 4–4 (Home: 3–3; Road: 1–1)

Game	Date	Team	Score	High points	High rebounds	High assists	Location Attendance	Record
33	September 1	@ Dallas	W 100–93	Kelsey Mitchell (36)	Boston, Smith (8)	Caitlin Clark (12)	College Park Center; 6,251	17–16
34	September 4	Los Angeles	W 93–86	Boston, Clark (24)	Aliyah Boston (14)	Caitlin Clark (10)	Gainbridge Fieldhouse; 16,645	18–16
35	September 6	Minnesota	L 88–99	Caitlin Clark (25)	Lexie Hull (9)	Caitlin Clark (8)	Gainbridge Fieldhouse; 17,274	18–17
36	September 8	Atlanta	W 104–100 (OT)	Aliyah Boston (30)	Aliyah Boston (13)	Caitlin Clark (12)	Gainbridge Fieldhouse; 17,274	19–17
37	September 11	Las Vegas	L 75–86	Kelsey Mitchell (24)	Aliyah Boston (10)	Caitlin Clark (6)	Gainbridge Fieldhouse; 17,274	19–18
38	September 13	Las Vegas	L 74–78	Kelsey Mitchell (20)	Boston, Clark (8)	Caitlin Clark (9)	Gainbridge Fieldhouse; 17,274	19–19
39	September 15	Dallas	W 110–109	Caitlin Clark (35)	Boston, Smith (6)	Caitlin Clark (8)	Gainbridge Fieldhouse; 17,274	20–19
40	September 19	@ Washington	L 91–92	Kristy Wallace (17)	Clark, Smith (5)	Caitlin Clark (8)	Capital One Arena; 20,711	20–20

2024 season schedule

=== Playoffs ===
2024 playoff game log
First round vs. Connecticut Sun
Lost Series: 0–2

Game	Date	Team	Score	High points	High rebounds	High assists	Location Attendance	Series
1	September 22	@ Connecticut	L 69–93	Kelsey Mitchell (21)	Aliyah Boston (11)	Caitlin Clark (8)	Mohegan Sun Arena; 8,910	0–1
2	September 25	@ Connecticut	L 81–87	Caitlin Clark (25)	Aliyah Boston (19)	Caitlin Clark (9)	Mohegan Sun Arena; 8,910	0–2

2024 playoff schedule

== Standings ==
#	Team	W	L	PCT	GB	Conf.	Home	Road	Cup
1	yx – New York Liberty	32	8	.800	—	16–4	16–4	16–4	5–0
2	cx – Minnesota Lynx	30	10	.750	2	14–6	16–4	14–6	4–1
3	x – Connecticut Sun	28	12	.700	4	14–6	14–6	14–6	4–1
4	x – Las Vegas Aces	27	13	.675	5	12–8	13–7	14–6	2–3
5	x – Seattle Storm	25	15	.625	7	13–7	14–6	11–9	4–1
6	x – Indiana Fever	20	20	.500	12	11–9	12–8	8–12	3–2
7	x – Phoenix Mercury	19	21	.475	13	10–10	10–10	9–11	3–2
8	x – Atlanta Dream	15	25	.375	17	7–13	8–12	7–13	1–4
9	e – Washington Mystics	14	26	.350	18	7–13	5–15	9–11	1–4
10	e – Chicago Sky	13	27	.325	19	5–15	6–14	7–13	1–4
11	e – Dallas Wings	9	31	.225	23	6–14	7–13	2–18	0–5
12	e – Los Angeles Sparks	8	32	.200	24	5–15	5–15	3–17	2–3

Notes

(#) – League Standing
c – Commissioner's Cup winners
y – Regular Season Champion
x – Clinched playoff berth
e – Eliminated from playoff contention
Source: Overall standings and Commissioner's Cup Standings

== Playoffs ==
**First round** Best-of-3
**1**	**New York Liberty**	**2**
8	Atlanta Dream	0
**4**	**Las Vegas Aces**	**2**
5	Seattle Storm	0
2	**Minnesota Lynx**	**2**
7	Phoenix Mercury	0
3	**Connecticut Sun**	**2**
6	Indiana Fever	0

**Semifinals**; Best-of-5
1	**New York Liberty**	**3**
4	Las Vegas Aces	1
2	**Minnesota Lynx**	**3**
3	Connecticut Sun	2

**Finals**; Best-of-5
1	**New York Liberty**	**3**
2	Minnesota Lynx	2

- **Bold** – Series winner
- Italic – Team with home-court-advantage

== Statistics ==
Legend
GP	Games played	GS	Games started	MPG	Minutes per game	RPG	Rebounds per game
APG	Assists per game	SPG	Steals per game	BPG	Blocks per game	PPG	Points per game
FG%	Field-goal percentage	3P%	3-point field-goal percentage	FT%	Free-throw percentage	TO	Turnovers per game
PF	Fouls per game		Team leader		League leader

=== Regular season ===
Player	GP	GS	MPG	FG%	3P%	FT%	RPG	APG	SPG	BPG	TO	PF	PPG
Caitlin Clark	40	40	35.4	.417	.344	.906	5.7	8.4	1.3	0.7	5.6	2.8	19.2
Kelsey Mitchell	40	38	32.0	.468	.402	.832	2.5	1.8	0.7	0.2	1.6	1.6	19.2
Aliyah Boston	40	40	30.9	.529	.269	.736	8.9	3.2	0.9	1.2	2.0	3.3	14.0
NaLyssa Smith	40	37	24.8	.480	.292	.567	7.1	1.0	0.8	1.0	1.3	2.7	10.6
Temi Fagbenle	22	2	18.9	.509	.167	.786	4.7	0.9	0.5	0.7	1.2	3.0	6.4
Lexie Hull	34	11	19.7	.441	.471	.805	2.5	1.1	0.6	0.3	0.9	2.5	5.5
Kristy Wallace	26	15	17.2	.402	.293	.667	1.8	1.7	0.7	0.2	0.7	1.1	4.7
Damiris Dantas	20	0	10.5	.459	.394	.667	2.2	0.6	0.3	0.3	0.6	1.0	4.5
Katie Lou Samuelson	37	15	18.2	.349	.330	.960	2.3	1.4	0.3	0.2	0.5	1.4	4.3
Erica Wheeler	39	2	14.0	.411	.288	.846	1.4	1.8	0.4	0.1	0.9	1.2	3.6
Grace Berger	11	0	9.3	.400	.400	.643	1.4	0.6	0.5	0.0	0.9	1.1	2.8
Victaria Saxton	9	0	2.6	.333	.250	.500	0.3	0.0	0.0	0.0	0.1	0.4	0.9
Celeste Taylor ^{‡}	5	0	3.2	1.000	—	.500	0.2	0.2	0.0	0.2	0.2	0.2	0.6

^{‡}Waived/Released during the season
^{†}Traded during the season
^{≠}Acquired during the season

=== Playoffs ===
Player	GP	GS	MPG	FG%	3P%	FT%	RPG	APG	SPG	BPG	TO	PF	PPG
Kelsey Mitchell	2	2	38.5	.421	.263	.500	3.0	4.0	0.0	0.0	4.5	2.0	19.0
Caitlin Clark	2	2	38.0	.350	.200	.750	5.0	8.5	2.0	1.0	2.5	3.0	18.0
Aliyah Boston	2	2	32.5	.577	—	.750	15.0	3.0	0.5	2.0	2.0	3.0	16.5
Damiris Dantas	2	0	16.0	.500	.400	1.000	1.0	0.5	0.0	0.0	0.5	1.5	8.0
Lexie Hull	2	2	30.0	.308	.143	.800	4.5	2.0	2.5	0.5	1.5	4.0	6.5
Temi Fagbenle	2	1	24.0	.444	.500	—	5.5	2.0	0.5	0.0	0.5	2.0	4.5
Victaria Saxton	1	0	2.0	1.000	—	—	0.0	0.0	0.0	0.0	0.0	0.0	2.0
Erica Wheeler	2	0	9.5	.000	—	.750	0.0	1.5	0.0	0.0	0.5	1.0	1.5
NaLyssa Smith	2	1	6.5	.000	—	—	2.0	0.0	0.5	0.5	1.0	0.5	0.0
Katie Lou Samuelson	1	0	5.0	.000	—	—	0.0	0.0	0.0	0.0	0.0	1.0	0.0
Grace Berger	1	0	2.0	—	—	—	0.0	1.0	0.0	0.0	0.0	0.0	0.0
Kristy Wallace	1	0	2.0	.000	—	—	0.0	0.0	0.0	0.0	0.0	0.0	0.0

== Awards and honors ==
Recipient	Award	Date awarded	Ref.
Caitlin Clark	Rookie of the Month – May	June 3, 2024	
Caitlin Clark	WNBA All-Star Starter	July 2, 2024	
Caitlin Clark	Rookie of the Month – July	July 19, 2024	
Caitlin Clark	AP Player of the Week	August 20, 2024	
Caitlin Clark	Eastern Conference Player of the Week	August 27, 2024	
Caitlin Clark	Eastern Conference Player of the Week	September 3, 2024	
Caitlin Clark	Eastern Conference Player of the Week	September 10, 2024	
Caitlin Clark	Eastern Conference Player of the Month – August	September 4, 2024	
Caitlin Clark	Rookie of the Month – August	September 4, 2024	
Caitlin Clark	Rookie of the Month – September	September 20, 2024	
Caitlin Clark	Peak Performer: Assists	September 20, 2024	
Caitlin Clark	AP Rookie of the Year	September 22, 2024	
Caitlin Clark	AP All-WNBA First Team	September 22, 2024	
Caitlin Clark	AP All-Rookie Team	September 22, 2024	
Caitlin Clark	WNBA Rookie of the Year	October 3, 2024	
Caitlin Clark	WNBA All-Rookie Team	October 3, 2024	
Caitlin Clark	All-WNBA First Team	October 16, 2024	
Caitlin Clark	Best WNBA Player ESPY Award	July 16, 2025	
Aliyah Boston	WNBA All-Star	July 2, 2024	
Aliyah Boston	Eastern Conference Player of the Week	June 18, 2024	
Kelsey Mitchell	WNBA All-Star	July 2, 2024	
Christie Sides	Coach of the Month – August	September 2, 2024	
