= Grace Berger =

American basketball player (born 1999)

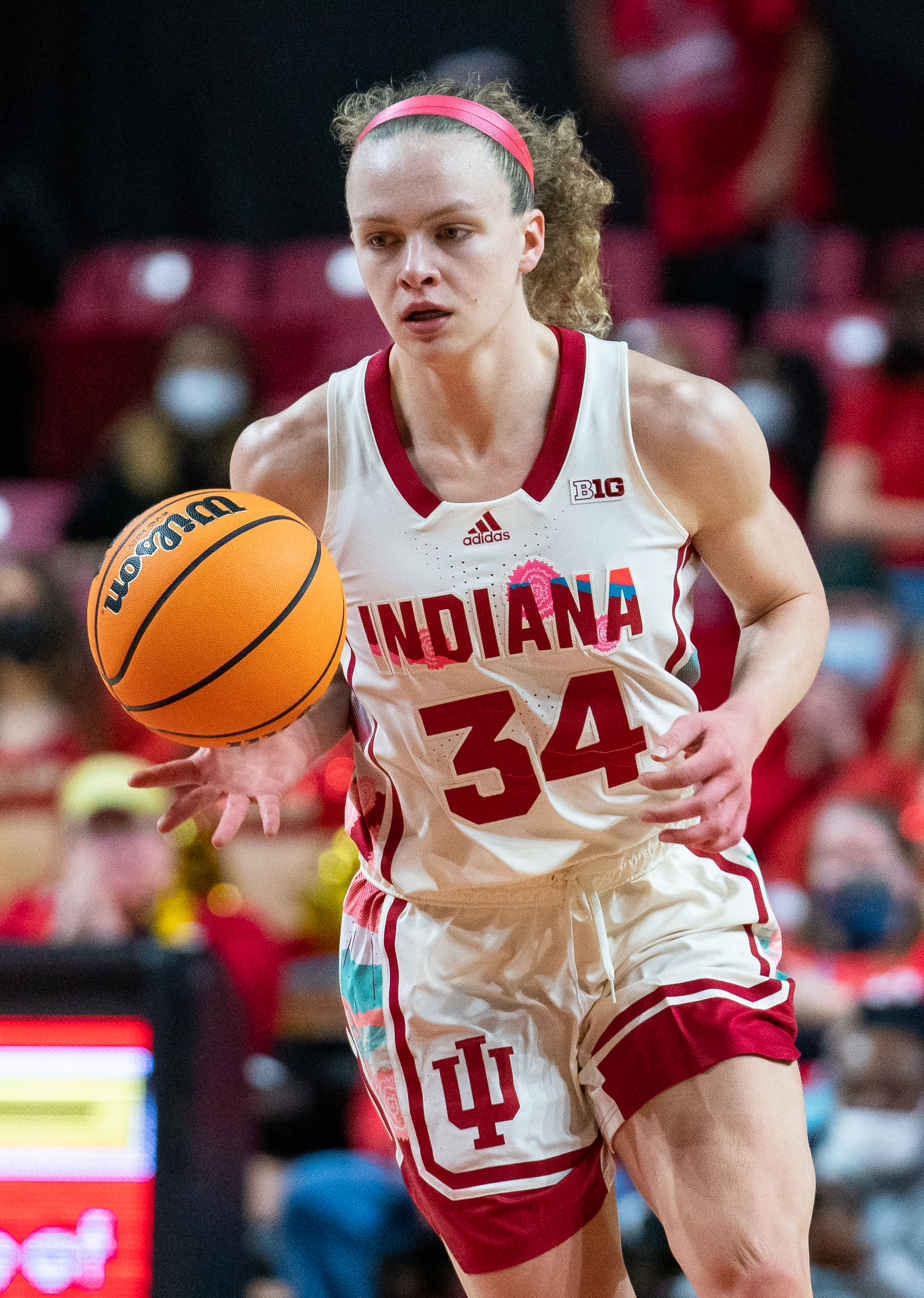
- Berger with Indiana in 2022

No. 34 – Free agent
- Position: Point guard
- League: WNBA

Personal information
- Born: June 3, 1999 (age 27) Louisville, Kentucky, U.S.
- Listed height: 5 ft 11 in (1.80 m)
- Listed weight: 163 lb (74 kg)

Career information
- High school: Sacred Heart Academy (Louisville, Kentucky)
- College: Indiana (2018–2023)
- WNBA draft: 2023: 1st round, 7th overall pick
- Drafted by: Indiana Fever
- Playing career: 2023–present

Career history
- 2023–2024: Indiana Fever
- 2023: Gernika KESB
- 2024: Athletes Unlimited League
- 2024–2025: OGM Ormanspor
- 2025: Los Angeles Sparks
- 2025: Dallas Wings
- 2026: Gigantes de Carolina

Career highlights
- 4× First-team All-Big Ten (2020–2023)
- Stats at WNBA.com
- Stats at Basketball Reference
Medals
Women's basketball
Representing the United States
FIBA AmeriCup
Gold medal – first place	2021 Puerto Rico	Team

Grace Elizabeth Berger (born June 3, 1999) is an American professional basketball player who most recently played for the Dallas Wings of the Women's National Basketball Association (WNBA). She played college basketball for the Indiana Hoosiers. She was selected seventh overall by the Indiana Fever in the 2023 WNBA draft.

== Early life ==
Berger played basketball for Sacred Heart Academy in Louisville, Kentucky. In her junior season, she averaged 14.5 points, 8.6 rebounds and 3.5 assists per game, helping her team win the Seventh Region title and reach the state finals. As a senior, Berger earned Courier-Journal Athlete of the Year, Kentucky All-Star and Seventh Region Player of the Year honors after averaging 15.2 points, 8.3 rebounds and 3.1 assists and leading Sacred Heart back to the regional final. She was a three-time All-State selection in high school. Rated a five-star recruit by ESPN, Berger committed to play college basketball for Indiana over offers from Kentucky, Louisville and Michigan.

== College career ==
As a freshman at Indiana, Berger averaged 5.5 points and 2.8 rebounds per game. In her sophomore season, she averaged 13.1 points, 5.2 rebounds and 3.5 assists per game, leading her team to a program-record 24 wins. She was a first-team All-Big Ten selection. On November 25, 2020, in her junior season debut, Berger recorded the first triple-double in program history, with 17 points, 10 rebounds and 10 assists in a 100–51 win against Eastern Kentucky. She led the NCAA Division I with three triple-doubles during the season. Berger averaged 15.4 points, 6.8 rebounds, 4.6 assists per game and was named first-team All-Big Ten. At the 2021 NCAA tournament, she led Indiana to its first-ever Elite Eight appearance. On February 12, 2022, Berger scored a career-high 29 points in a 76–58 win over Michigan State. As a senior, she averaged 16.2 points, 6.2 rebounds and 4.7 assists per game and was named first-team All-Big Ten for a third straight season. Berger opted to return for a fifth year of eligibility, granted due to the COVID-19 pandemic.

== Professional career ==
=== WNBA ===
==== Indiana Fever (2023–2024) ====
On April 10, 2023, Berger was selected in the first round as the seventh overall pick of the 2023 WNBA draft by the Indiana Fever. In her first season with the Fever, she appeared in 36 games and her role gradually grew as the season progressed.

Berger's role declined in her second season with the Fever and she appeared in only 11 regular-season games.

Berger was waived by the Fever on February 2, 2025.

==== Minnesota Lynx ====
Berger was awarded on waivers to the Minnesota Lynx on February 7, 2025. She was waived by the Lynx on May 14.

==== Los Angeles Sparks (2025) ====
The Los Angeles Sparks signed Berger to a hardship contract on June 17, 2025. She played that day against the Seattle Storm and her former Indiana Hoosiers teammate Mackenzie Holmes, who had joined the Storm the day prior. Berger was waived by the Sparks on June 20.

==== Dallas Wings (2025) ====
On July 16, 2025, Berger was signed to a seven-day hardship contract with the Dallas Wings. She was waived on July 23 after appearing in one game with the Wings; the team re-signed her to a second seven-day hardship contract on July 24. This contract expired after July 30, and with 11 healthy players on the roster, the Wings were not immediately eligible for another hardship contract. The Wings signed Berger to a third seven-day hardship contract, the maximum number of week-long contracts a team may give a player in a season, on August 5. On August 12, the Wings signed her to a rest-of-season contract after she made her first career start on August 10 against the Washington Mystics.

She spent training camp with the Wings in 2026, but was waived on May 4 during final roster cuts.

=== Athletes Unlimited ===
Berger played in the 2024 season of the Athletes Unlimited League.

=== Overseas ===
In the 2023 WNBA off-season, Berger played for Gernika KESB of the Liga Femenina de Baloncesto. However, a thumb injury cut her time in Europe short and she ended up playing only 8 games.

In July 2024, Berger signed with OGM Ormanspor of the Turkish Super League.

On June 13, 2025, Berger signed a one-year contract with the Sydney Flames of the Australian Women's National Basketball League (WNBL). However, she could not join the team due to an injury suffered during the 2025 WNBA season.

As of September 2026, Berger is serving as starting shooting guard for the Gigantes de Carolina in Puerto Rico's professional women's basketball league, The Baloncesto Superior Nacional Femenino.

== Career statistics ==
Legend
GP	Games played	GS	Games started	MPG	Minutes per game	RPG	Rebounds per game
APG	Assists per game	SPG	Steals per game	BPG	Blocks per game	PPG	Points per game
TO	Turnovers per game	FG%	Field-goal percentage	3P%	3-point field-goal percentage	FT%	Free-throw percentage
**Bold**	Career best	°	League leader

=== WNBA ===
==== Regular season ====
WNBA regular season statistics
Year	Team	GP	GS	MPG	FG%	3P%	FT%	RPG	APG	SPG	BPG	TO	PPG
2023	Indiana	**36**	0	14.6	**.449**	**.471**	**.840**	1.6	1.9	0.5	0.2	1.0	**4.2**
2024	Indiana	11	0	9.3	.400	.400	.643	1.4	0.6	0.5	0.0	**0.9**	2.8
2025	Los Angeles	1	0	16.0	.000	.000	—	1.0	1.0	0.0	0.0	3.0	0.0
2025	Dallas	18	**13**	**22.3**	.306	.095	.667	**3.4**	**3.2**	**0.8**	**0.4**	1.0	3.6
**Career**	3 years, 3 teams	66	13	15.8	.386	.323	.741	2.0	2.0	0.5	0.2	1.0	3.7

==== Playoffs ====
WNBA playoff statistics
Year	Team	GP	GS	MPG	FG%	3P%	FT%	RPG	APG	SPG	BPG	TO	PPG
2024	Indiana	1	0	2.0	—	—	—	0.0	1.0	0.0	0.0	0.0	0.0
**Career**	1 year, 1 team	1	0	2.0	—	—	—	0.0	1.0	0.0	0.0	0.0	0.0

=== College ===
NCAA statistics
Year	Team	GP	GS	MPG	FG%	3P%	FT%	RPG	APG	SPG	BPG	TO	PPG
2018–19	Indiana	**34**	4	20.3	.422	.217	.521	2.8	1.6	0.7	0.1	**1.6**	5.5
2019–20	Indiana	30	30	34.4	.456	.300	.769	5.2	3.5	**1.4**	0.2	2.5	13.1
2020–21	Indiana	27	27	34.1	.441	.324	.744	**6.8**	4.6	1.1	0.2	2.0	15.4
2021–22	Indiana	33	**33**	**36.4**	.460	.261	**.788**	6.2	4.7	**1.4**	0.2	2.6	**16.2**
2022–23	Indiana	24	24	32.0	**.484**	**.407**	.757	4.8	**5.8**	1.0	**0.3**	2.5	12.9
**Career**		148	118	31.1	.452	.306	.742	5.1	3.9	1.1	0.2	2.2	12.4

== National team career ==
Berger represented the United States at the 2021 FIBA AmeriCup. She averaged 6.2 points, 3.6 rebounds and 2.2 assists per game, helping her team win the gold medal.
