= Kristy Wallace =

Australian basketball player (born 1996)

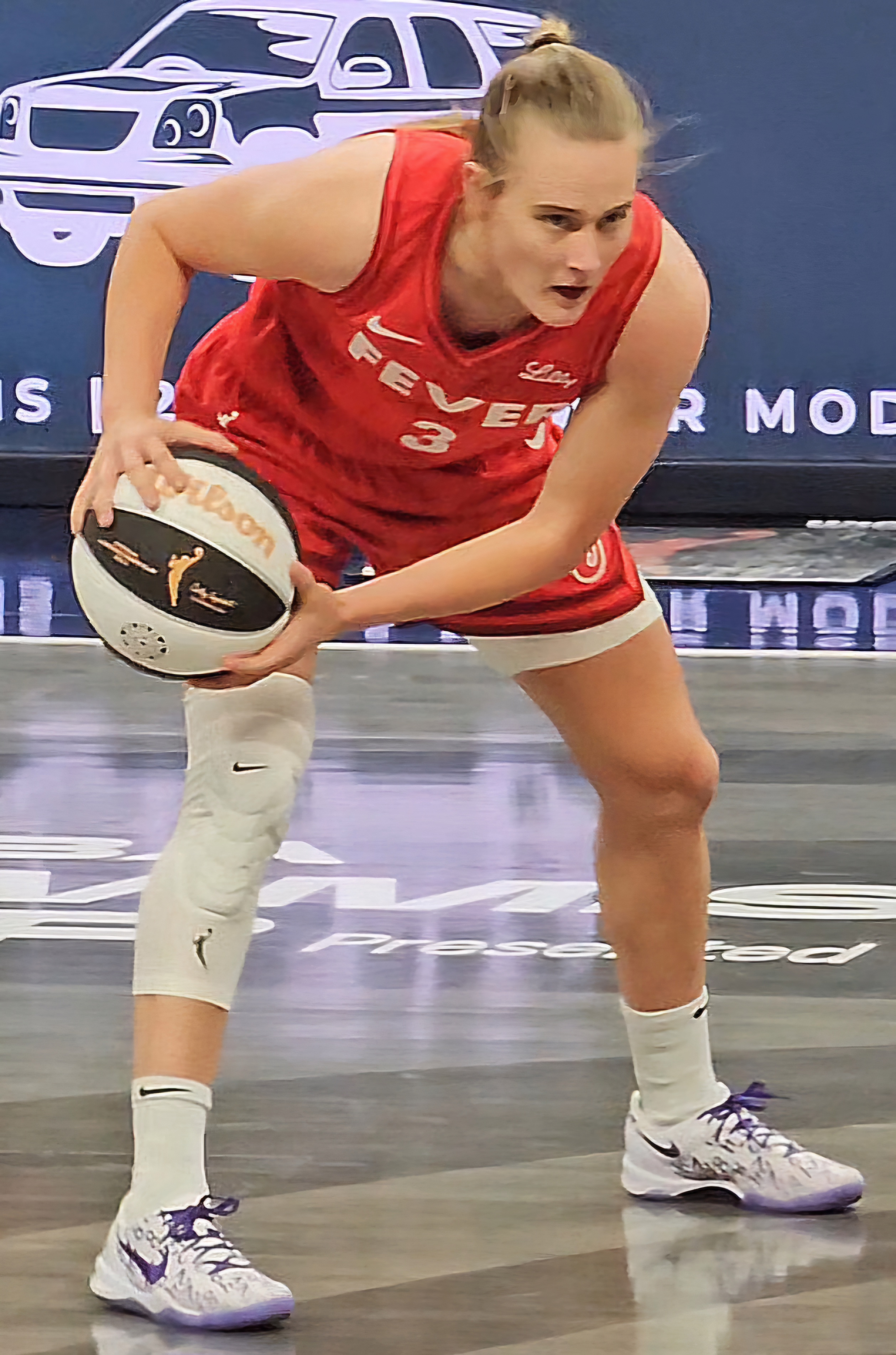
- Wallace with the Indiana Fever in 2024

Free agent
- Position: Guard

Personal information
- Born: 3 January 1996 (age 30) Loganholme, Queensland, Australia
- Listed height: 5 ft 11 in (1.80 m)
- Listed weight: 157 lb (71 kg)

Career information
- High school: John Paul College (Brisbane, Queensland)
- College: Baylor (2014–2018)
- WNBA draft: 2018: 2nd round, 16th overall pick
- Drafted by: Atlanta Dream
- Playing career: 2012–present

Career history
- 2012–2013: Brisbane Spartans
- 2014: BA Centre of Excellence
- 2018–2020: Canberra Capitals
- 2021: Melbourne Tigers
- 2021–2022: Southside Flyers
- 2022: Atlanta Dream
- 2022–2024: Melbourne Boomers
- 2023–2024: Indiana Fever
- 2025: Tokomanawa Queens

Career highlights
- WNBL Sixth Woman of the Year (2022); First-team All-Big 12 (2018); Big 12 All-Defensive Team (2018); Big 12 All-Freshman Team (2015)
- Stats at Basketball Reference
Medals
Women's basketball
Representing Australia
Olympic Games
Bronze medal – third place	2024 Paris	Team
World Cup
Bronze medal – third place	2022 Australia
FIBA Asia Cup
Bronze medal – third place	2021 Jordan
Summer Universiade
Gold medal – first place	2017 Taiwan	Team
FIBA Under-19 World Championship
Bronze medal – third place	2015 Russia	Team
FIBA Under-18 Oceania Championship
Gold medal – first place	2014 Fiji	Team
Women's 3x3 basketball
Asia Cup
Gold medal – first place	2026 Singapore	Team

Kristy Wallace (born 3 January 1996) is an Australian professional basketball player. She played college basketball for the Baylor Lady Bears.

At the 2024 Summer Olympics she won a bronze medal with the Australian team.

== College career ==
Wallace played four seasons of college basketball in the United States for the Baylor Lady Bears. She earned Big 12 All-Freshman Team in 2015 and Big 12 All-Defensive Team and First-team All-Big 12 in 2018.

== Professional career ==
Wallace was picked in the second round of the 2018 WNBA draft by the Atlanta Dream. She later signed a two-year deal with the Canberra Capitals. A knee injury in her second game with Canberra in late 2018 saw her not play again until 2021 in the NBL1 South with the Melbourne Tigers. She joined the Southside Flyers for the 2021–22 WNBL season and won the WNBL Sixth Woman of the Year Award.

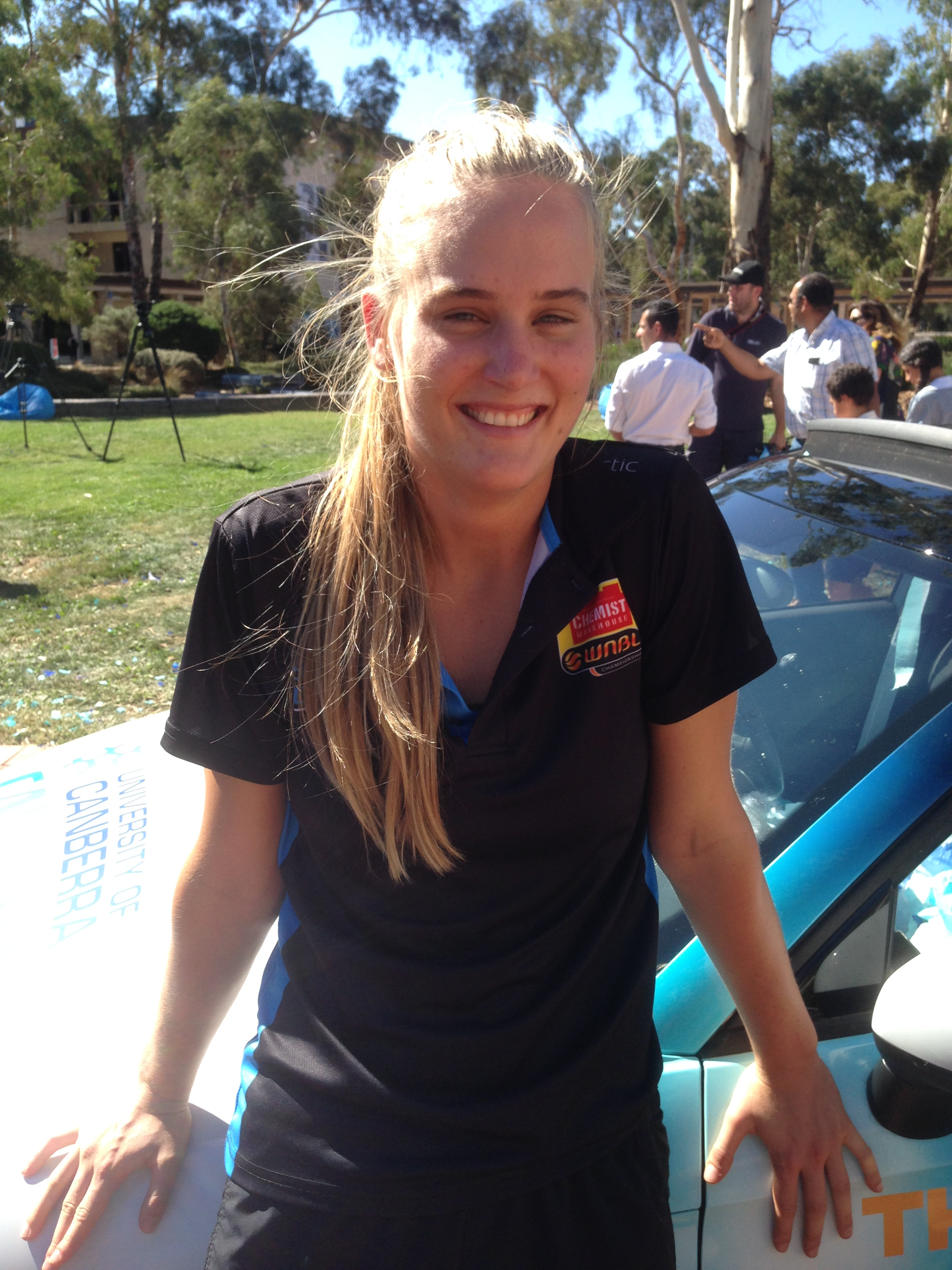
Wallace in February 2019

On 13 January 2023, Wallace was traded from the Atlanta Dream to the Indiana Fever.

Wallace was a member of the Australia Women's national basketball team (Opals) at the 2024 Summer Olympics in Paris. The Opals won the bronze medal, winning over Belgium.

Wallace announced on February 25, 2025, that she would not play during the 2025 WNBA season. Her contract was suspended with Wallace not eligible to return during the season and the Fever retaining her rights.

In August 2025, Wallace helped the Knox Raiders win the NBL1 South championship and the NBL1 National championship. Later that year, she was named most valuable player of the Tauihi Basketball Aotearoa with the Tokomanawa Queens.

On April 3, 2026, the Toronto Tempo selected Wallace in the 2026 WNBA Expansion Draft acquiring her from the Indiana Fever. She was waived on 30 April 2026 following the first pre-season game.

== Career statistics ==
Legend
GP	Games played	GS	Games started	MPG	Minutes per game	RPG	Rebounds per game
APG	Assists per game	SPG	Steals per game	BPG	Blocks per game	PPG	Points per game
TO	Turnovers per game	FG%	Field-goal percentage	3P%	3-point field-goal percentage	FT%	Free-throw percentage
**Bold**	Career best	°	League leader

=== WNBA ===
==== Regular season ====
WNBA regular season statistics
Year	Team	GP	GS	MPG	FG%	3P%	FT%	RPG	APG	SPG	BPG	TO	PPG
2018	Did not appear in WNBA												
2019	Did not play (knee injury)												
2020	Did not play (knee injury)												
2021	Did not appear in WNBA												
2022	Atlanta	29	**18**	**20.8**	**.407**	.368	**.786**	**2.3**	**2.2**	0.6	**0.2**	1.5	**6.6**
2023	Indiana	**37**	9	19.7	.401	**.435**	.750	2.2	1.9	0.6	**0.2**	1.3	**6.6**
2024	Indiana	26	15	17.2	.402	.293	.667	1.8	1.7	**0.7**	**0.2**	**0.7**	4.7
2025	Did not play (personal decision)												
**Career**	3 years, 2 teams	92	42	19.3	.403	.374	.750	2.2	1.9	0.6	0.2	1.2	6.1

==== Playoffs ====
WNBA playoff statistics
Year	Team	GP	GS	MPG	FG%	3P%	FT%	RPG	APG	SPG	BPG	TO	PPG
2024	Indiana	1	0	2.0	.000	—	—	0.0	0.0	0.0	0.0	0.0	0.0
**Career**	1 year, 1 team	1	0	2.0	.000	—	—	0.0	0.0	0.0	0.0	0.0	0.0

=== College ===
NCAA statistics
Year	Team	GP	GS	MPG	FG%	3P%	FT%	RPG	APG	SPG	BPG	TO	PPG
2014–15	Baylor	33	6	22.5	.408	.371	.657	2.5	2.2	1.1	0.2	2.0	7.8
2015–16	Baylor	**37**	20	27.4	.397	.386	.765	3.3	2.4	**1.3**	0.5	**1.8**	8.1
2016–17	Baylor	**37**	**37**	28.2	.427	**.389**	.689	3.9	**5.6**	1.3	0.4	2.2	7.6
2017–18	Baylor	29	29	**30.1**	**.502**	.384	**.797**	**5.0**	5.3	1.0	**0.6**	2.5	**12.9**
**Career**		136	92	27.0	.435	.383	.736	3.6	3.9	1.2	0.4	2.1	8.9

== National team ==
Wallace made her international debut for the Gems at the 2014 FIBA Oceania Under-18 Championship in Fiji. Wallace would then go on to represent the Gems at the Under-19 World Championship in Russia the following year, where they finished in third place and took home the bronze medal.

In March 2026, Wallace was named in the Australia women's national 3x3 team for the FIBA 3x3 Champions Cup. The following month, she played at the 2026 FIBA 3x3 Asia Cup, helping the team win the gold medal.
