= Aliyah Boston =

American basketball player (born 2001)

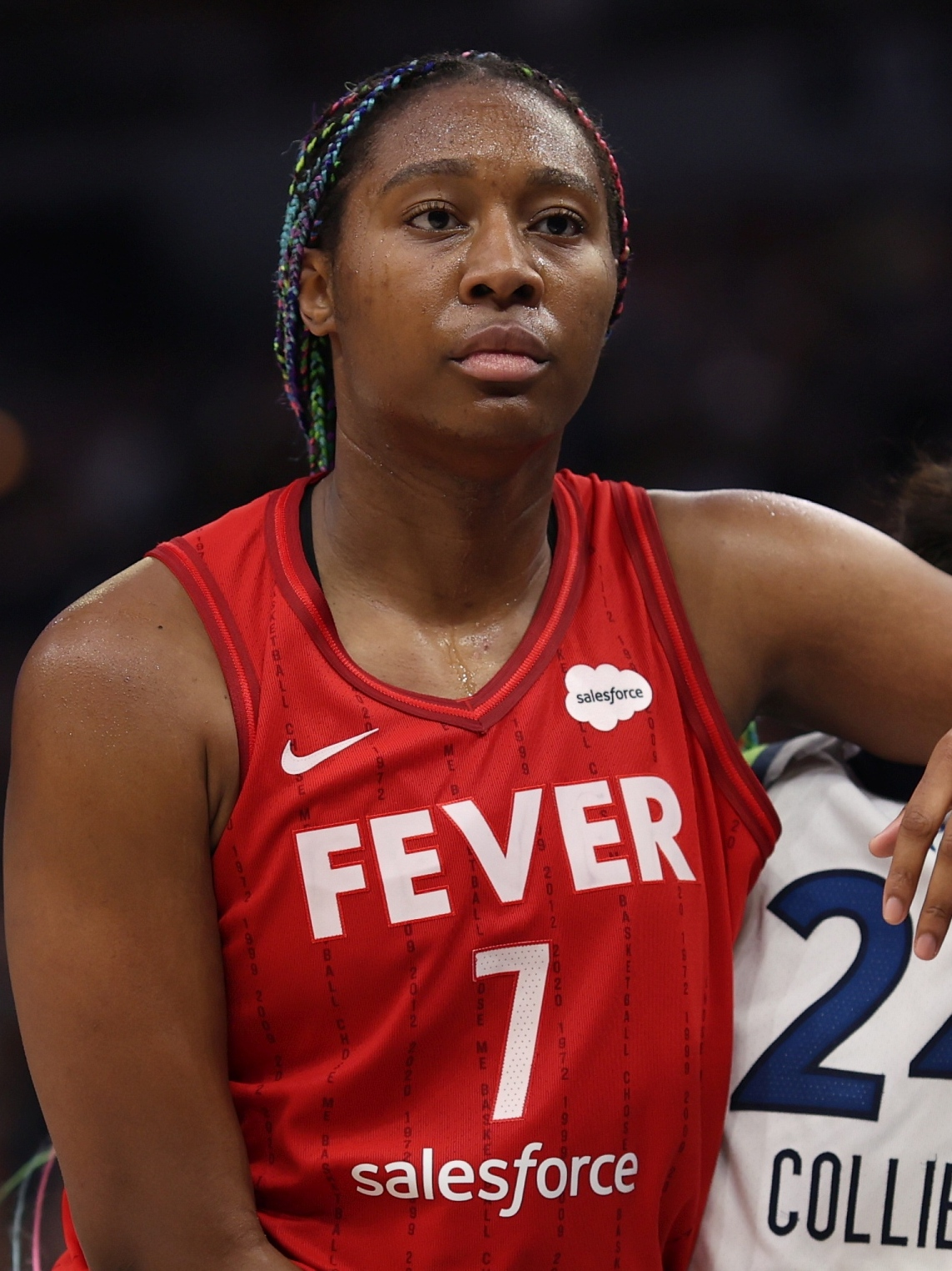
- Boston with the Indiana Fever in 2023

No. 7 – Indiana Fever
- Position: Power forward / center
- League: WNBA

Personal information
- Born: December 11, 2001 (age 24) Saint Thomas, U.S. Virgin Islands
- Listed height: 6 ft 5 in (1.96 m)
- Listed weight: 217 lb (98 kg)

Career information
- High school: Worcester Academy (Worcester, Massachusetts)
- College: South Carolina (2019–2023)
- WNBA draft: 2023: 1st round, 1st overall pick
- Drafted by: Indiana Fever
- Playing career: 2023–present

Career history
- 2023–present: Indiana Fever
- 2025: Vinyl BC
- 2026–present: Phantom BC

Career highlights
- WNBA Rookie of the Year (2023); 4× WNBA All-Star (2023–2026); All-WNBA Second Team (2025); WNBA All-Defensive Second Team (2025); WNBA All-Rookie Team (2023); WNBA Commissioner's Cup champion (2025); NCAA champion (2022); NCAA Tournament MOP (2022); AP Player of the Year (2022); Honda Sports Award (2022); Honda-Broderick Cup (2022); John R. Wooden Award (2022); Naismith College Player of the Year (2022); USBWA National Player of the Year (2022); Wade Trophy (2022); 2× Naismith Defensive Player of the Year (2022, 2023); 4× Lisa Leslie Award (2020–2023); Division I Academic All-American of the Year (2022); 2× Women's Basketball Academic All-American of the Year (2021, 2022); 3× Unanimous First-team All-American (2021–2023); 3× WBCA Coaches' All-American (2021–2023); Second-team All-American – AP, USBWA (2020); 3× SEC champion (2020, 2021, 2023); 2× SEC Tournament MVP (2021, 2023); SEC Female Athlete of the Year (2022); 2× SEC Player of the Year (2022, 2023); 4× SEC Defensive Player of the Year (2020–2023); 4× First-team All-SEC (2020–2023); 4× SEC All-Defensive Team (2020–2023); USBWA National Freshman of the Year (2020); WBCA Freshman of the Year (2020); SEC Freshman of the Year (2020); SEC All-Freshman Team (2020); FIBA Americas Championship MVP (2017); FIBA World Cup All-Star Five (2018); McDonald's All-American (2019)
- Stats at Basketball Reference
Medals
Women's basketball
Representing the United States
FIBA World Cup
Gold medal – first place	2026 Germany
FIBA AmeriCup
Gold medal – first place	2021 San Juan	Team
FIBA U19 Women's World Cup
Gold medal – first place	2019 Thailand	Team
FIBA Under-17 Women's World Cup
Gold medal – first place	2018 Belarus	Team
FIBA Under-16 Americas Championship
Gold medal – first place	2017 Argentina	Team
Women's 3x3 basketball
Representing the United States
Youth Olympic Games
Gold medal – first place	2018 Argentina	Team

Aliyah Boston (born December 11, 2001) is an American professional basketball power forward and center for the Indiana Fever of the Women's National Basketball Association (WNBA) and for the Phantom of Unrivaled. She was named 2023 WNBA Rookie of the Year in a unanimous vote and the AP Rookie of the Year. She played college basketball at the University of South Carolina.

Born in Saint Thomas, United States Virgin Islands, Boston attended Worcester Academy in Worcester, Massachusetts, where she was a McDonald's All-American and a three-time Massachusetts Gatorade Player of the Year. Boston has won several gold medals representing the United States.

Boston led South Carolina to their second national championship in school history in 2022 and was named the NCAA Tournament Most Outstanding Player (MOP). That year, she also won Player of the Year and Defensive Player of the Year honors. Boston won the Lisa Leslie Award as the best center in NCAA women's basketball in four consecutive years.

On April 1, 2023, Boston declared for the 2023 WNBA draft. Boston chose to forgo her extra year of eligibility granted to college athletes due to the COVID-19 pandemic. She ended her four-year collegiate career with a record of 129 wins and 9 losses. Boston was the first overall pick in the WNBA draft on April 10, 2023, selected by the Indiana Fever.

== Early life and education ==
Boston was born on December 11, 2001, to parents Cleone and Al in Saint Thomas, U.S. Virgin Islands. Boston fell in love with basketball at age 9 while watching her older sister Alexis play. At age 12, Aliyah and Alexis moved from their home in the Virgin Islands to New England to live with their aunt, Jenaire Hodge, and her cousin, Kira Punter. Boston would only see her parents a few times over the following years, mostly to watch Aliyah's AAU basketball games.

"When I first started playing, it was kind of just for fun, but then I realized how much you could get out of playing. So we've all had faith in God that I could; my goal is to go to college with a scholarship. God has helped us with that".

— Aliyah Boston

Boston attended Worcester Academy in Worcester, Massachusetts, winning Gatorade Massachusetts Player of the Year honors in 2017, 2018, and 2019. Boston led her team to a 24–1 record and a second straight New England Prep School Athletic Council (NEPSAC) Class A championship in 2019. That year, she was a consensus All-American, averaging 17.3 points, 10.6 rebounds, and 3.2 blocks per game. Boston was selected to play in the McDonald's All-American Game and the Jordan Brand Classic in 2019.

A five-star recruit, Boston was ranked third in the ESPN HoopGurlz 2019 class. Boston committed to Dawn Staley and the South Carolina Gamecocks over UConn, Ohio State, and Notre Dame, giving the Gamecocks the consensus number one recruiting class for 2019.

== College career ==
=== 2019–20: Freshman season ===
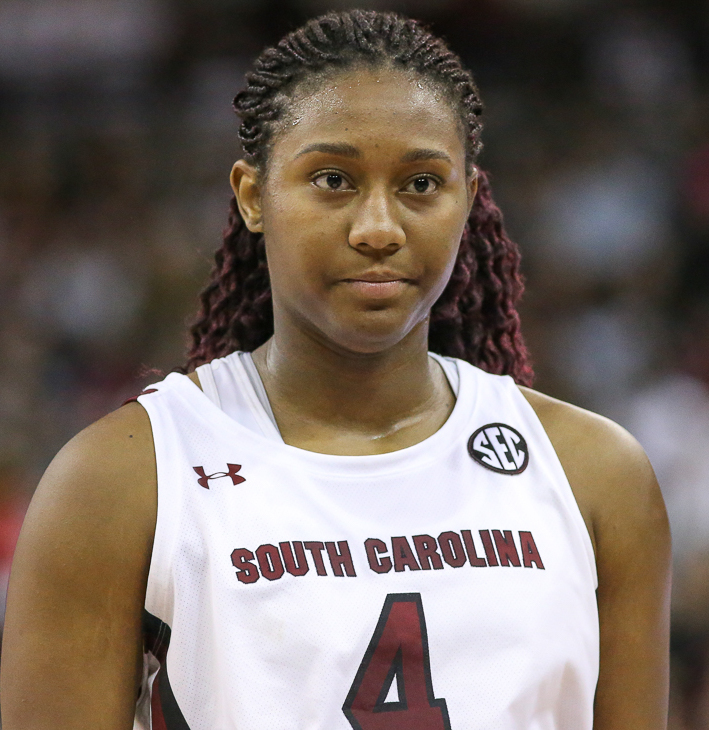
Boston with South Carolina in 2020.

In her first game at the University of South Carolina on November 5, 2019, Boston posted the first triple-double by a freshman in program history and the first by any NCAA Division I player in her career debut against Alabama State, including a school-record tying 10 blocks. Boston helped lead the Gamecocks to a big early season road win against No. 4 Maryland scoring eight of the team's first 10 points and blocking five shots in the opening quarter.

In the 2019 Paradise Jam, Boston won Reef Division MVP after she had 20 points and 13 rebounds in a win against No. 2 Baylor, clinching the tournament championship. On January 20, 2020, Boston notched her eighth double-double of the season, finishing with 12 rebounds and 21 points in a win over No. 9 Mississippi State. Boston played a huge role in the No. 1 Gamecocks' first-ever victory over the UConn Huskies on February 10, capturing her tenth double-double.

Against the LSU, Boston blocked five shots to become the program's all-time freshman blocks leader in a win. Boston would finish the regular season averaging a double-double against SEC competition (13.1 PPG/10.3 RPG) as the No. 1 Gamecocks (32–1) swept the SEC regular season and tournament championships.

Boston was named consensus Freshman of the Year, and was part of the first team in Gamecock history to end the season ranked No. 1 in the nation, claiming that spot in both the AP Poll and the USA Today Coaches Poll, before the NCAA tournament was canceled due to the COVID-19 pandemic.

=== 2020–21: Sophomore season ===
Boston started off the season hot against the 23rd-ranked Iowa State, recording five of the team's first 10 points, which included a 3-pointer. She then scored four of her season-high 13 points off offensive rebounds. Against Florida, Boston continued to show her all-around game when she hit three 3's and recorded 28 points, 16 rebounds, and 4 blocks. Scoring 19 points and 11 rebounds in the first half, she became the 11th fastest Gamecock to score 500 points in her career. On January 10 in a win at 10th ranked Kentucky, Boston put up 20 points and 12 rebounds, scoring her fourth double double of the season and also included seven blocks, she would earn SEC co-player of the week honors. Boston helped secure a 104–82 win over 17th-ranked Arkansas; she finished with 26 points and 16 rebounds. She scored six points, six rebounds, and three blocks in the game's opening five minutes. On January 21, in a win over Georgia, Boston made history as the program's first triple-double in SEC play, finishing with 16 points, 11 rebounds, and 10 blocks. Against LSU, Boston notched her third straight double-double with 20 points, 14 rebounds. Facing a tough double team against Alabama, Boston remained poised and handed out a career high 6 assists to go with 13 rebounds. In a road game against UConn, Boston completed her eighth double-double on the season, pulling down 15 rebounds, including eight in the final 15 minutes.

Boston was crucial in the Gamecocks' SEC Tournament Championship win, in the semifinals vs. Tennessee, Boston scored 15 points and 11 rebounds, and in the finals against Georgia, scored 27 points and 10 rebounds. Boston was named SEC Tournament MVP. She recorded double-doubles in all three of the Gamecocks games. In her NCAA Tournament debut against no. 16th-seeded Mercer, she would notch a 20-point and 18-rebound game. In the elite eight against Texas, Boston scored six of her ten points in the first quarter. Boston had 16 rebounds in the season-ending loss against Stanford and missed a potential game-winning lay-up at the buzzer as South Carolina lost 66–65. At the conclusion of the season, she was named Lisa Leslie award winner for the second straight year, was named consensus First Team All-American, and was named National Player of the year by The Athletic.

Boston is also the first sophomore ever to be named by the College Sports Information Directors of America as its Academic All-American of the Year in D-I women's basketball, earning the honor in 2021.

=== 2021–22: Junior season ===
On February 24, she broke the SEC record with her 20th consecutive double-double in the win at Texas A&M.

In the Final Four, she had a win against #4 Louisville, 15 points and 10 rebounds. In South Carolina's 64–49 National Championship win over UConn, Boston had 11 points and 16 rebounds for her 30th double-double of the season. It was the program's second national championship. She was named the NCAA Tournament MOP.

=== 2022–23: Senior season ===
Boston scored 14 points and grabbed 13 rebounds in South Carolina's 76–71 win at No. 2 Stanford. On November 27, 2022, Boston suffered a leg injury in a win against Hampton. In the 2023 NCAA tournament, South Carolina advanced to the Final Four but lost 73–77 to Iowa, which shattered their 42-game winning streak.

She finished her senior year as a unanimous first-team All-American for the third consecutive year, and also won Naismith Defensive Player of the Year, the Lisa Leslie Award, SEC Player of the Year, and SEC Defensive Player of the Year.

== Professional career ==
=== WNBA (2023–present) ===
==== 2023: Rookie of the Year ====
On April 10, 2023, Boston became the first overall pick in the 2023 WNBA draft, selected by the Indiana Fever (first in franchise history). After her first four games, Boston won WNBA Rookie of the Month in May after averaging 15.8 points, 6.0 rebounds, and 1.3 blocks per game. On June 20, she was awarded WNBA Eastern Conference Player of the Week. At the end of June, Boston was awarded WNBA Rookie of the Month again while also being named a starter for the 2023 WNBA All-Star Game – becoming just the eighth rookie in league history to start the game – finishing with six points and a team-high 11 rebounds. Before the playoffs started, Boston won the final WNBA Rookie of the Month award of the season averaging 14.6 points, 9.4 rebounds, and 1.8 blocks per game in August.

At the end of the 2023 season, Boston was unanimously named WNBA Rookie of the Year. She was also named annual Rookie of the Year by the Associated Press as well as earning AP All-Rookie Team recognition. Furthermore, she became the first player in WNBA history to ever lead the league in field goal percentage (57.8%) as a rookie.

==== 2024: Sophomore season ====
On December 10, 2023, Boston represented the Fever at the 2024 WNBA draft lottery, helping Indiana secure the first overall pick for the second straight year, where they selected Caitlin Clark.

On June 18, 2024, Boston was named the Eastern Conference Player of the Week. On July 2, 2024, Boston was named to the Team WNBA All-Star team and received the second most fan votes of any player (618,680 votes).

==== 2025: Third season ====
In April 2025, the Fever exercised their fourth-year option for Boston, extending her contract into the 2026 season.

On June 30, 2025, Boston was named as an All-Star starter for the third time in her career.

==== 2026: Fourth season ====
On April 17, 2026, Boston agreed to a contract extension with the Indiana Fever that will keep her with the team through the 2029 season. The deal marks the first use of the Exceptional Performance on Initial Contract (EPIC) provision, which permits eligible players to sign maximum or supermax contracts before completing their rookie-scale agreements.

Boston became eligible for renegotiation after being named to the All-WNBA Second Team following the 2025 season, allowing her to modify the fourth and final year of her rookie contract under the EPIC framework.

The extension followed an active offseason for Indiana, during which the Fever added five players and re-signed four others. Boston, the 2023 Rookie of the Year, played a central role in the team’s run to the WNBA semifinals and opted to remain with the franchise on a multi-year deal.

=== Unrivaled (2024–present) ===
On October 31, 2024, it was announced that Boston would appear and play in the inaugural 2025 season of Unrivaled, the women's 3-on-3 basketball league founded by Napheesa Collier and Breanna Stewart. She played for the Vinyl in the 2025 season.

On November 5th, 2025, it was announced that Boston had been drafted by Phantom BC for the 2026 Unrivaled season.

Boston suffered a right lower extremity injury in her final regular-season game in Unrivaled and was unable to participate in Phantom's postseason games. Named the league's Defensive Player of the Year, she helped take Phantom to the No. 1 seed in the playoffs, averaging 18.9 points, 9.7 rebounds, and 2.1 blocks across the season. The league's fourth-leading rebounder, Boston was named to the 2026 All-Unrivaled Second Team. The injury also prevented Boston from participating for Team USA in the FIBA Women's World Cup Qualifying Tournament in Puerto Rico.

== National team career ==
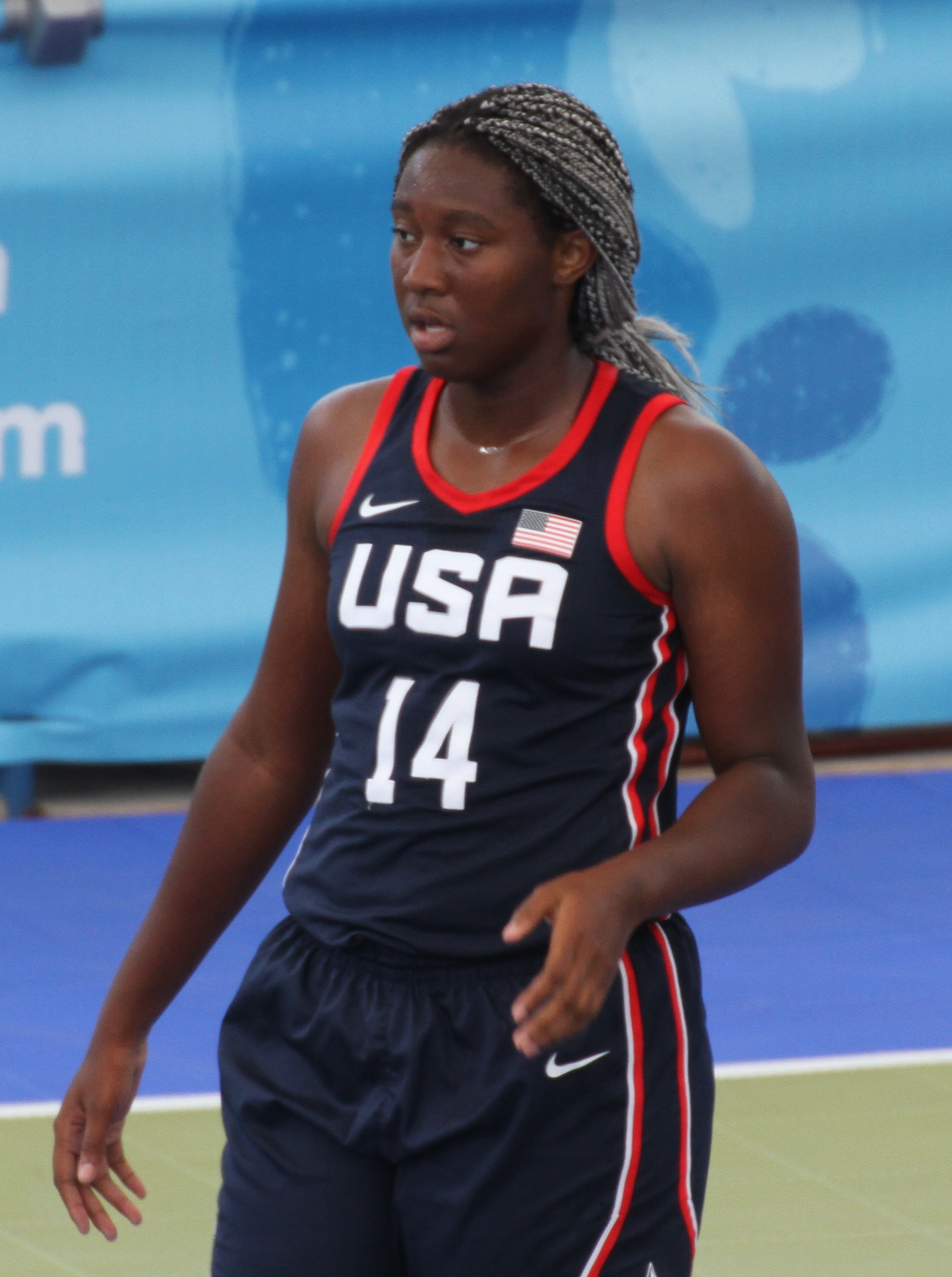
Boston with the United States at the 2018 Summer Youth Olympics.

Boston has represented the United States at various international competitions, including the 2017 FIBA Under-16 Women's Americas Championship, 2018 Summer Youth Olympics, 2018 FIBA Under-17 Women's Basketball World Cup, and 2019 FIBA Under-19 Women's Basketball World Cup winning gold each time, she was named MVP of the FIBA Americas U16 Championship. Boston also won gold at the 2021 FIBA Women's AmeriCup.

== Career statistics ==
Legend
GP	Games played	GS	Games started	MPG	Minutes per game	RPG	Rebounds per game
APG	Assists per game	SPG	Steals per game	BPG	Blocks per game	PPG	Points per game
TO	Turnovers per game	FG%	Field-goal percentage	3P%	3-point field-goal percentage	FT%	Free-throw percentage
**Bold**	Career best	°	League leader

*	Denotes season(s) in which Boston won an NCAA Championship

=== WNBA ===
==== Regular season ====
WNBA regular season statistics
Year	Team	GP	GS	MPG	FG%	3P%	FT%	RPG	APG	SPG	BPG	TO	PPG
2023	Indiana	40°	40°	**31.2**	**.578**°	.400	.745	8.4	2.2	1.3	**1.3**	1.9	14.5
2024	Indiana	40°	40°	30.9	.529	.269	.736	**8.9**	3.2	.9	1.2	2.0	14.0
2025	Indiana	**44**	**44**	30.2	.538	.207	.762	8.2	**3.7**	1.2	.9	**1.8**	15.0
2026	Indiana	40	40	27.1	.528	**.406**	**.812**	8.0	3.0	**1.5**	1.2	2.3	**16.1**
**Career**	4 years, 1 team	164	164	29.8	.542	.351	.764	8.3	3.0	1.2	1.1	2.0	14.9
**Career**	All-Star	4	3	12.7	.529	.125	.000	5.0	1.3	.3	.0	.8	4.8

==== Playoffs ====
WNBA playoff statistics
Year	Team	GP	GS	MPG	FG%	3P%	FT%	RPG	APG	SPG	BPG	TO	PPG
2024	Indiana	2	2	**32.5**	.577	—	**.750**	**15.0**°	3.0	.5	**2.0**	2.0	16.5
2025	Indiana	**8**	**8**	31.5	.441	.111	.680	11.4	**4.1**	.5	.4	1.9	12.5
2026	Indiana	3	3	28.7	**.581**	**.455**	.400	7.3	4.0	**1.0**	1.0	**.7**	**19.7**
**Career**	3 years, 1 team	13	13	31.0	.500	.300	.615	11.0	3.9	.6	.8	1.6	14.8

=== College ===
NCAA statistics
Year	Team	GP	GS	MPG	FG%	3P%	FT%	RPG	APG	SPG	BPG	TO	PPG
2019–20	South Carolina	33	33	23.8	**.608**	.167	.738	9.4	1.0	**1.3**	**2.6**	**1.1**	12.5
2020–21	South Carolina	31	31	**30.3**	.485	.265	.764	11.5	1.6	1.2	**2.6**	1.6	13.7
2021–22*	South Carolina	**37**	**37**	27.5	.542	**.292**	**.771**	**12.5**	**2.0**	1.2	2.4	1.5	**16.8**
2022–23	South Carolina	**37**	**37**	26.2	.559	.105	.753	9.8	1.9	.5	2.0	1.2	13.0
**Career**		138	138	27.2	.546	.242	.759	10.8	1.7	1.0	2.4	1.4	14.1

== Awards and honors ==
WNBA

- 3× WNBA All-Star: 2023–2025
- WNBA Rookie of the Year: 2023
- 3× WNBA Player of the Week
- WNBA All-Rookie Team: 2023
- 3× WNBA Rookie of the Month: 2023
- WNBA field goal percentage leader: 2023
- WNBA All-Defensive Second Team (2025)

Indiana Fever

- Single-season leader in rebounds (2024)

NCAA

- NCAA Tournament Most Outstanding Player: 2022
- Naismith College Player of the Year: 2022
- USBWA Women's National Player of the Year: 2022
- John R. Wooden Award: 2022
- Wade Trophy: 2022
- AP Women's College Basketball Player of the Year: 2022
- 4× Lisa Leslie Award: 2020–2023
- 2× Naismith Defensive Player of the Year: 2022, 2023
- 3× AP First-team All-American: 2021, 2022, 2023
- 3× USBWA First-team All-American: 2021, 2022, 2023
- 2x WBCA First-team All-American: 2021, 2022
- AP Second-team All-American: 2020
- USBWA Second-team All-American: 2020
- USBWA National Freshman of the Year: 2020
- WBCA Freshman of the Year: 2020
- Honda-Broderick Cup: 2022
- Honda Sports Award: 2022
- Honda Cup Collegiate Woman Athlete of the Year: 2022
- 2x SEC Player of the Year: 2022, 2023
- 2x SEC tournament MVP: 2021, 2023
- SEC Freshman of the Year: 2020
- 4× First-team All-SEC: 2020, 2021, 2022, 2023
- 4× SEC All-Defensive Team: 2020, 2021, 2022, 2023
- 4× SEC Defensive Player of the Year: 2020, 2021, 2022, 2023
- 2× Academic All-American of the Year, D-I women's basketball: 2021, 2022

International

- FIBA Under-16 Women's Americas Championship MVP (2017)
- FIBA Under-17 Women's Basketball World Cup All-Tournament Team (2018)

High school

- 3x Gatorade Massachusetts Player of the Year (2017, 2018, 2019)
- USA Today Massachusetts Player of the Year (2019)
- Naismith All-America Second Team (2019)
- WBCA All-America Second Team (2019)
- McDonald's All-America (2019)
- SLAM All-America (2019)

Media

- AP WNBA Rookie of the Year: 2023
- AP WNBA All-Rookie Team: 2023

== Records ==
=== NCAA ===
- Most career rebounds in the NCAA tournament: 199
- Most career offensive rebounds in the NCAA tournament: 70
- Highest career average rebounds per game in the NCAA tournament: 12.4

=== Southeastern Conference ===
- Most career triple-doubles: 2
- Most consecutive double-doubles in a single season: 27 (2021–22)

=== South Carolina Gamecocks ===
Career

- Most career games started: 138
- Most consecutive games started: 138
- Most career rebounds: 1,493
- Most career offensive rebounds: 518
- Most career defensive rebounds: 975
- Most career triple-doubles: 2
- Most career double-doubles: 82

Senior (2022–23)

- Most games played in a single season: 37
- Most games started in a single season: 37

Junior (2021–22)

- Most games played in a single season: 37
- Most games started in a single season: 37
- Most rebounds in a single season: 462
- Most offensive rebounds in a single season: 150
- Most defensive rebounds in a single season: 312
- Most shots blocked by a junior: 90
- Most double-doubles posted in a single season: 30
- Most consecutive double-doubles posted in a single season: 27 (2021–22)
- Most offensive rebounds in a single game: 12 (March 24, 2022)
- Highest field goal percentages in a single game: 100.0% (November 29, 2021)
- Fastest player to reach 1,000 points

Sophomore (2020–21)

- Most shots blocked in a single game: 10 (January 21, 2021)
- First player to post a triple-double in an SEC game (January 21, 2021)

Freshman (2019–20)

- Most games started by a freshman: 33
- Most shots blocked by a freshman: 86
- Most double-doubles posted by a freshman: 13
- Most shots blocked in a single game: 10 (November 5, 2019)
- First freshman to post a triple-double (November 5, 2019)

== Off the court ==
=== Education and broadcasting ===
Boston graduated from the University of South Carolina in 2023 with a degree in communications. As of 2023 she planned to work in broadcast sports journalism after her playing career.

In October 2023, she joined Peacock as a studio analyst for their Big Ten women's basketball coverage after her rookie WNBA season. In 2024, she joined NBC Sports.

=== Philanthropy ===
In February 2024, Boston joined the WNBA Changemakers Collective and their collaboration with VOICEINSPORT (VIS) as a mentor, "aimed at keeping girls in sport and developing diverse leaders on the court and beyond the game."

In October 2024, Boston founded the Aliyah Boston Foundation to empower and support the youth in the Virgin Islands. In November 2025, the foundation sponsored the first Pathway to Purpose: Youth Finance Summit, to help students learn financial literacy skills. In March 2026, they held their first annual basketball clinic in St. Thomas.

=== Business interests ===
In October 2024, Boston appeared in a TikTok ad campaign for TOGETHXR and Aflac alongside Fever teammate, Lexie Hull. In July 2025, Boston joined the ownership group for the Boston Legacy FC.
