= 2024 Las Vegas Aces season =

28th season of the WNBA

- Head coach: Becky Hammon
- Arena: Michelob Ultra Arena

Results
- Record: 27–13 (.675)
- Place: 2nd (Western)
- Playoff finish: 4th seed; Lost in Semifinals 1–3 to New York Liberty

The 2024 Las Vegas Aces season was the franchise's 27th season in the Women's National Basketball Association and the seventh year the franchise is based in Las Vegas - after relocating from San Antonio and Utah. This was the third season under head coach Becky Hammon. They were the defending WNBA champions, after defeating the New York Liberty in the 2023 WNBA Finals. In 2023, the Aces also finished with the most regular season wins in WNBA history, 34. Additionally, the Aces won back-to-back WNBA titles, and were the first team to do so since 2001–2002. The season tipped off on Tuesday, May 14, 2024, at home versus the Phoenix Mercury.

On May 17, 2024, the Las Vegas Convention and Visitors Authority (LVCVA) announced that they would be gifting each player on the 2024 Aces roster a $100,000 sponsorship. This sponsorship is independent of the Aces organization as per the WNBA's collective bargaining agreement. On May 18, 2024, the WNBA opened an investigation into these sponsorships. As of June 2025, no results of the league's probe into this sponsorship had been made public.

The transgressions didn't have an effect on the start of the season as the Aces won their first two games. They did lose to Phoenix by ten points on May 21 for their first loss. They won their next two games before losing to Atlanta to finish May 4–2. They defeated Dallas to start June, but would lose their next three games. They defeated Phoenix to break the streak, but lost to New York in the next game. Their losing streak would end after that as the Aces won their next four games to finish June 6–4. They extended their winning streak to six games by defeating Indiana and Washington to start July. An overtime loss to Los Angeles would break their winning streak. The Aces built a new streak winning their next four games in a row. They would lose to Chicago to finish July 6–2 and head into the Olympic break with a 16–8 record. The Aces were not as dominant upon returning from the break, losing their first game back to New York. They would defeat Los Angeles before losing two games in a row to Minnesota. Two wins bookended a loss to see the Aces finish August 3–4. With a win over Atlanta on August 30, the Aces clinched their playoff berth. The Aces became dominant in September, winning their first three games of the month. A four point loss to New York on September 8 would be the only mar on their record for the month. The would the remaining five straight games, with the closest being a four point win in Indiana on September 13. The Aces finished the regular season 27–13.

The Aces' 27–13 record saw them finish in fourth place in the overall standings. As the fourth seed in the 2024 WNBA Playoffs, they faced-off against fifth seed Seattle in the First Round. The first two games were held in Las Vegas and the Aces won them both, 78–67 and 86–73. They advanced to the Semifinals where they faced New York in a best-of-five series. The Aces lost the first two games in New York, 77–87 and 84–88. They would win game three in Las Vegas to extend the series, 95–81. The Aces were unable to win game four at home and were eliminated from the playoffs, losing the series one game to three.

== Transactions ==
=== WNBA draft ===
Round	Pick	Player	Position	Nationality	College/Club	Outcome
2	16	Dyaisha Fair	G	United States	Syracuse	Waived
2	18	Kate Martin	G	United States	Iowa	Signed
2	24	Elizabeth Kitley	C	United States	Virginia Tech	Unsigned – due to injury
3	36	Angel Jackson	C	United States	Jackson State	Waived

=== Transactions ===
Date	Details
February 1, 2024	Signed Megan Gustafson
February 1, 2024	Re-signed Kiah Stokes
February 1, 2024	Re-signed Sydney Colson
February 1, 2024	Signed Morgan Jones to a Training Camp Contract
February 4, 2024	Signed Kamaria McDaniel to a Training Camp Contract
February 7, 2024	Re-signed Candace Parker
February 8, 2024	Signed Bria Hartley to a Training Camp Contract
March 28, 2024	Signed Brea Beal to a Training Camp Contract
April 17, 2024	Signed Dyaisha Fair and Angel Jackson to Rookie Contracts
April 22, 2024	Signed Kate Martin to Rookie Contract
April 28, 2024	Candace Parker announced her retirement
April 29, 2024	Signed Chelsea Gray to a Contract Extension
May 2, 2024	Waived Brea Beal and Morgan Jones
May 3, 2024	Signed Jackie Young to a Contract Extension
May 6, 2024	Waived Bria Hartley
May 6, 2024	Waived Kamaria McDaniel
May 6, 2024	Claimed/Awarded Emma Cannon from Waivers
May 7, 2024	Waived Angel Jackson
May 13, 2024	Exercised fourth-year option for Kierstan Bell
May 26, 2024	Waived Dyaisha Fair
May 31, 2024	Signed Tiffany Hayes
June 16, 2024	Waived Emma Cannon
June 16, 2024	Signed Jessika Carter
June 30, 2024	Waived Jessika Carter
September 2, 2024	Signed Queen Egbo to 7-day contract

=== Roster changes ===
==== Additions ====
Personnel	Signed/Trade	Former team
Emma Cannon	Signed	Dallas Wings
Jessika Carter	Signed	Mississippi State
Dyaisha Fair	Draft	Syracuse
Megan Gustafson	Signed	Phoenix Mercury
Tiffany Hayes	Signed	Connecticut Sun
Angel Jackson	Draft	Jackson State
Kate Martin	Draft	Iowa

==== Subtractions ====
Personnel	Reason	New team
Emma Cannon	Waived	—
Jessika Carter	Waived	—
Dyaisha Fair	Waived	—
Cayla George	Released	—
Angel Jackson	Waived	—
Candace Parker	Retired	

== Roster ==
2024 Las Vegas Aces roster
Players
Coaches

Pos.	No.	Nat.	Name	Height	Weight	DOB	From	Yrs
F	1	(United States)	Bell, Kierstan	6' 1" (1.85m)	176 lb (80kg)	2000-03-16	Florida Gulf Coast	2
F	7	(Israel)	Clark, Alysha	5' 11" (1.8m)	167 lb (76kg)	1987-07-07	Middle Tennessee	11
G	51	(United States)	Colson, Sydney	5' 8" (1.73m)	140 lb (64kg)	1989-08-06	Texas A&M	9
F/C	4	(United States)	Egbo, Queen	6' 4" (1.93m)	190 lb (86kg)	2000-06-29	Baylor	2
G	12	(United States)	Gray, Chelsea	5' 11" (1.8m)	170 lb (77kg)	1992-10-08	Duke	9
C	17	(Spain)	Gustafson, Megan	6' 3" (1.91m)	195 lb (88kg)	1996-12-13	Iowa	5
G	15	(Azerbaijan)	Hayes, Tiffany	5' 10" (1.78m)	155 lb (70kg)	1989-09-20	Connecticut	11
C	33	(United States)	Kitley, Elizabeth (injured) (DP)	6' 5" (1.96m)		2001-09-17	Virginia Tech	R
G	20	(United States)	Martin, Kate	6' 0" (1.83m)	172 lb (78kg)	2000-06-05	Iowa	R
G	10	(United States)	Plum, Kelsey	5' 8" (1.73m)	145 lb (66kg)	1994-08-24	Washington	6
C	41	(United States)	Stokes, Kiah	6' 3" (1.91m)	191 lb (87kg)	1993-03-30	Connecticut	8
F	22	(United States)	Wilson, A'ja	6' 4" (1.93m)	195 lb (88kg)	1996-08-08	South Carolina	6
G	0	(United States)	Young, Jackie	6' 0" (1.83m)	165 lb (75kg)	1997-09-16	Notre Dame	5

Head coach
(United States) Becky Hammon (Colorado State)
Assistant coaches
(United States) Natalie Nakase (UCLA)
(United States) Tyler Marsh (Birmingham–Southern)
(United States) Charlene Thomas-Swinson (Auburn)
Athletic trainer
(United States) Michelle Anumba (Duke)

Legend

- (C) Team captain
- (DP) Unsigned draft pick
- (FA) Free agent
- (S) Suspended
- Injured

=== Depth chart ===
Pos.	Starter	Bench
PG	Chelsea Gray	Sydney Colson
SG	Kelsey Plum	Tiffany Hayes
SF	Jackie Young	Alysha Clark; Kate Martin
PF	A'ja Wilson	Kierstan Bell
C	Kiah Stokes	Megan Gustafson

== Schedule ==
=== Pre-season ===
2024 pre-season game log
Total: 1–0 (Home: 1–0; Road: 0–0)
May: 1–0 (Home: 1–0; Road: 0–0)

Game	Date	Team	Score	High points	High rebounds	High assists	Location Attendance	Record
1	May 11	Puerto Rico	W 102–50	A'ja Wilson (27)	A'ja Wilson (14)	Tied–3 (3)	Colonial Life Arena; 13,507	1–0

2024 pre-season schedule

=== Regular season ===
2024 game log
Total: 27–13 (Home: 13–7; Road: 14–6)
May: 4–2 (Home: 3–1; Road: 1–1)

Game	Date	Team	Score	High points	High rebounds	High assists	Location Attendance	Record
1	May 14	Phoenix	W 89–80	A'ja Wilson (30)	A'ja Wilson (13)	Jackie Young (6)	Michelob Ultra Arena; 10,419	1–0
2	May 18	Los Angeles	W 89–82	Tied (22)	A'ja Wilson (10)	Jackie Young (11)	Michelob Ultra Arena; 10,286	2–0
3	May 21	Phoenix	L 88–98	Kelsey Plum (27)	A'ja Wilson (13)	Jackie Young (8)	Michelob Ultra Arena; 10,374	2–1
4	May 25	Indiana	W 99–80	A'ja Wilson (29)	A'ja Wilson (15)	Kelsey Plum (7)	Michelob Ultra Arena; 10,399	3–1
5	May 29	@ Minnesota	W 80–66	A'ja Wilson (29)	A'ja Wilson (15)	Jackie Young (10)	Target Center; 7,409	4–1
6	May 31	@ Atlanta	L 74–78	A'ja Wilson (28)	A'ja Wilson (9)	Kelsey Plum (6)	Gateway Center Arena; 4,015	4–2

June : 6–4 (Home: 2–3; Road: 4–1)

Game	Date	Team	Score	High points	High rebounds	High assists	Location Attendance	Record
7	June 5	@ Dallas	W 95–81	A'ja Wilson (36)	A'ja Wilson (12)	Jackie Young (7)	College Park Center; 6,251	5–2
8	June 7	Seattle	L 65–78	A'ja Wilson (29)	A'ja Wilson (11)	Tiffany Hayes (4)	Michelob Ultra Arena; 10,380	5–3
9	June 9	@ Los Angeles	L 92–96	A'ja Wilson (31)	A'ja Wilson (8)	Tied (5)	Crypto.com Arena; 13,900	5–4
10	June 11	Minnesota	L 86–100	A'ja Wilson (28)	Kiah Stokes (9)	Tied (4)	Michelob Ultra Arena; 10,368	5–5
11	June 13	@ Phoenix	W 103–99	Jackie Young (34)	A'ja Wilson (15)	Kelsey Plum (5)	Footprint Center; 9,325	6–5
12	June 15	New York	L 82–90	Kelsey Plum (22)	Kiah Stokes (12)	Jackie Young (6)	Michelob Ultra Arena; 10,424	6–6
13	June 19	Seattle	W 94–83	Jackie Young (32)	A'ja Wilson (9)	Kelsey Plum (8)	Michelob Ultra Arena; 10,380	7–6
14	June 21	Connecticut	W 85–74	A'ja Wilson (26)	A'ja Wilson (16)	Jackie Young (5)	Michelob Ultra Arena; 10,385	8–6
15	June 27	@ Chicago	W 95–83	A'ja Wilson (31)	Kiah Stokes (8)	Tied (5)	Wintrust Arena; 9,025	9–6
16	June 29	@ Washington	W 88–77	Jackie Young (26)	A'ja Wilson (9)	Kelsey Plum (8)	Entertainment and Sports Arena; 4,200	10–6

July : 6–2 (Home: 3–1; Road: 3–1)

Game	Date	Team	Score	High points	High rebounds	High assists	Location Attendance	Record
17	July 2	Indiana	W 88–69	Kelsey Plum (34)	Kiah Stokes (12)	Jackie Young (10)	T-Mobile Arena; 20,366	11–6
18	July 4	Washington	W 98–77	Kelsey Plum (28)	A'ja Wilson (9)	Jackie Young (10)	Michelob Ultra Arena; 10,376	12–6
19	July 5	@ Los Angeles	L 93–98 (OT)	A'ja Wilson (35)	A'ja Wilson (12)	Tied (6)	Crypto.com Arena; 13,840	12–7
20	July 7	Dallas	W 104–85	A'ja Wilson (28)	A'ja Wilson (10)	Jackie Young (5)	Michelob Ultra Arena; 10,369	13–7
21	July 10	@ Seattle	W 84–79	Jackie Young (27)	A'ja Wilson (20)	Chelsea Gray (6)	Climate Pledge Arena; 12,500	14–7
22	July 12	@ Atlanta	W 84–70	A'ja Wilson (33)	A'ja Wilson (18)	Kelsey Plum (7)	Gateway Center Arena; 3,344	15–7
23	July 14	@ Washington	W 89–77	A'ja Wilson (28)	A'ja Wilson (17)	Chelsea Gray (6)	Entertainment and Sports Arena; 4,200	16–7
24	July 16	Chicago	L 85–93	A'ja Wilson (28)	A'ja Wilson (14)	Gray, Plum (5)	Michelob Ultra Arena; 10,396	16–8

August : 3–4 (Home: 2–2; Road: 1–2)

Game	Date	Team	Score	High points	High rebounds	High assists	Location Attendance	Record
25	August 17	New York	L 67–79	A'ja Wilson (24)	A'ja Wilson (11)	Chelsea Gray (6)	Michelob Ultra Arena; 10,397	16–9
26	August 18	Los Angeles	W 87–71	A'ja Wilson (34)	A'ja Wilson (13)	Tied (4)	Michelob Ultra Arena; 10,311	17–9
27	August 21	Minnesota	L 87–98	Jackie Young (26)	A'ja Wilson (9)	A'ja Wilson (6)	Michelob Ultra Arena; 10,429	17–10
28	August 23	@ Minnesota	L 74–87	A'ja Wilson (24)	A'ja Wilson (7)	Alysha Clark (4)	Target Center; 9,124	17–11
29	August 25	@ Chicago	W 77–75	A'ja Wilson (20)	A'ja Wilson (18)	Chelsea Gray (7)	Wintrust Arena; 9,025	18–11
30	August 27	@ Dallas	L 90–93	A'ja Wilson (42)	Tied (6)	Jackie Young (6)	College Park Center; 6,251	18–12
31	August 30	Atlanta	W 83–72	A'ja Wilson (26)	A'ja Wilson (16)	A'ja Wilson (5)	Michelob Ultra Arena; 10,397	19–12

September : 8–1 (Home: 3–0; Road: 5–1)

Game	Date	Team	Score	High points	High rebounds	High assists	Location Attendance	Record
32	September 1	@ Phoenix	W 97–79	A'ja Wilson (41)	A'ja Wilson (17)	Jackie Young (14)	Footprint Center; 13,981	20–12
33	September 3	Chicago	W 90–71	A'ja Wilson (30)	A'ja Wilson (14)	Chelsea Gray (10)	T-Mobile Arena; 18,394	21–12
34	September 6	@ Connecticut	W 72–67	Kelsey Plum (27)	A'ja Wilson (8)	Chelsea Gray (6)	Mohegan Sun Arena; 8,910	22–12
35	September 8	@ New York	L 71–75	Kelsey Plum (25)	Kiah Stokes (9)	Gray, Plum (6)	Barclays Center; 15,393	22–13
36	September 11	@ Indiana	W 86–75	A'ja Wilson (27)	A'ja Wilson (12)	Tied (4)	Gainbridge Fieldhouse; 17,274	23–13
37	September 13	@ Indiana	W 78–74	Chelsea Gray (21)	A'ja Wilson (17)	Tied (6)	Gainbridge Fieldhouse; 17,274	24–13
38	September 15	Connecticut	W 84–71	A'ja Wilson (29)	A'ja Wilson (9)	Jackie Young (7)	Michelob Ultra Arena; 10,431	25–13
39	September 17	@ Seattle	W 85–72	Tied (21)	Tied (7)	Jackie Young (6)	Climate Pledge Arena; 14,298	26–13
40	September 19	Dallas	W 98–84	Megan Gustafson (24)	Megan Gustafson (7)	Bell, Hayes (5)	Michelob Ultra Arena; 10,376	27–13

2024 season schedule

=== Playoffs ===
2024 playoff game log
First round vs. Seattle Storm
Won Series: 2–0

Game	Date	Team	Score	High points	High rebounds	High assists	Location Attendance	Series
1	September 22	Seattle	W 78–67	A'ja Wilson (21)	Stokes, Wilson (8)	Chelsea Gray (7)	Michelob Ultra Arena; 10,369	1–0
2	September 24	Seattle	W 86–73	Kelsey Plum (29)	A'ja Wilson (13)	Chelsea Gray (9)	Michelob Ultra Arena; 10,370	2–0

Semifinals vs. New York Liberty
Lost Series: 1–3

Game	Date	Team	Score	High points	High rebounds	High assists	Location Attendance	Series
1	September 29	@ New York	L 77–87	Kelsey Plum (24)	A'ja Wilson (6)	A'ja Wilson (5)	Barclays Center; 14,015	0–1
2	October 1	@ New York	L 84–88	A'ja Wilson (24)	A'ja Wilson (7)	Chelsea Gray (7)	Barclays Center; 14,321	0–2
3	October 4	New York	W 95–81	Jackie Young (24)	A'ja Wilson (14)	Chelsea Gray (7)	Michelob Ultra Arena; 10,369	1–2
4	October 6	New York	L 62–76	A'ja Wilson (19)	A'ja Wilson (10)	Chelsea Gray (6)	Michelob Ultra Arena; 10,374	1–3

2024 playoff schedule

== Standings ==
#	Team	W	L	PCT	GB	Conf.	Home	Road	Cup
1	yx – New York Liberty	32	8	.800	—	16–4	16–4	16–4	5–0
2	cx – Minnesota Lynx	30	10	.750	2	14–6	16–4	14–6	4–1
3	x – Connecticut Sun	28	12	.700	4	14–6	14–6	14–6	4–1
4	x – Las Vegas Aces	27	13	.675	5	12–8	13–7	14–6	2–3
5	x – Seattle Storm	25	15	.625	7	13–7	14–6	11–9	4–1
6	x – Indiana Fever	20	20	.500	12	11–9	12–8	8–12	3–2
7	x – Phoenix Mercury	19	21	.475	13	10–10	10–10	9–11	3–2
8	x – Atlanta Dream	15	25	.375	17	7–13	8–12	7–13	1–4
9	e – Washington Mystics	14	26	.350	18	7–13	5–15	9–11	1–4
10	e – Chicago Sky	13	27	.325	19	5–15	6–14	7–13	1–4
11	e – Dallas Wings	9	31	.225	23	6–14	7–13	2–18	0–5
12	e – Los Angeles Sparks	8	32	.200	24	5–15	5–15	3–17	2–3

Notes

(#) – League Standing
c – Commissioner's Cup winners
y – Regular Season Champion
x – Clinched playoff berth
e – Eliminated from playoff contention
Source: Overall standings and Commissioner's Cup Standings

== Playoffs ==
**First round** Best-of-3
**1**	**New York Liberty**	**2**
8	Atlanta Dream	0
**4**	**Las Vegas Aces**	**2**
5	Seattle Storm	0
2	**Minnesota Lynx**	**2**
7	Phoenix Mercury	0
3	**Connecticut Sun**	**2**
6	Indiana Fever	0

**Semifinals**; Best-of-5
1	**New York Liberty**	**3**
4	Las Vegas Aces	1
2	**Minnesota Lynx**	**3**
3	Connecticut Sun	2

**Finals**; Best-of-5
1	**New York Liberty**	**3**
2	Minnesota Lynx	2

- **Bold** – Series winner
- Italic – Team with home-court-advantage

== Statistics ==
Legend
GP	Games played	GS	Games started	MPG	Minutes per game	RPG	Rebounds per game
APG	Assists per game	SPG	Steals per game	BPG	Blocks per game	PPG	Points per game
FG%	Field-goal percentage	3P%	3-point field-goal percentage	FT%	Free-throw percentage	TO	Turnovers per game
PF	Fouls per game		Team leader		League leader

=== Regular season ===
Player	GP	GS	MPG	FG%	3P%	FT%	RPG	APG	SPG	BPG	TO	PF	PPG
A'ja Wilson	38	38	34.4	.518	.317	.844	11.9	2.3	1.8	2.6	1.3	1.8	26.9
Kelsey Plum	38	38	34.0	.423	.368	.866	2.6	4.2	0.7	0.0	2.4	2.7	17.8
Jackie Young	37	37	32.6	.430	.337	.867	4.4	5.3	1.0	0.2	2.1	2.5	15.8
Tiffany Hayes ^{≠}	33	5	21.5	.500	.402	.714	2.8	2.1	0.8	0.3	0.8	2.1	9.5
Chelsea Gray	27	25	26.0	.408	.338	.813	2.9	4.9	1.3	0.7	2.4	1.4	8.6
Alysha Clark	40	18	24.3	.443	.373	.821	3.6	1.8	0.8	0.3	1.4	2.7	6.0
Megan Gustafson	38	7	10.7	.500	.386	.765	1.9	0.2	0.3	0.1	0.4	1.6	3.7
Kierstan Bell	6	0	7.2	.375	.500	.500	1.0	0.8	0.0	0.0	0.2	0.8	2.8
Queen Egbo ^{≠}	3	0	6.0	.667	—	—	1.7	0.0	0.7	0.3	0.0	0.7	2.7
Kate Martin	34	2	11.5	.307	.355	.917	1.6	0.9	0.2	0.2	0.6	0.9	2.6
Sydney Colson	31	1	8.0	.422	.378	.889	0.5	1.0	0.5	0.2	0.5	0.7	2.5
Kiah Stokes	39	29	18.4	.323	.225	.667	4.7	0.7	0.5	0.8	0.4	1.7	1.4
Emma Cannon ^{‡}	5	0	1.8	.667	.000	—	0.4	0.2	0.0	0.0	0.2	0.0	0.8
Dyaisha Fair ^{‡}	1	0	4.0	.000	.000	—	0.0	2.0	0.0	0.0	0.0	0.0	0.0
Jessika Carter ^{≠} ^{‡}	2	0	2.0	.000	—	.000	0.0	0.0	0.0	0.0	0.0	0.0	0.0

^{‡}Waived/Released during the season
^{†}Traded during the season
^{≠}Acquired during the season

=== Playoffs ===
Player	GP	GS	MPG	FG%	3P%	FT%	RPG	APG	SPG	BPG	TO	PF	PPG
A'ja Wilson	6	6	36.5	.535	.500	.750	9.7	2.8	0.3	2.5	1.3	1.2	21.3
Kelsey Plum	6	6	33.0	.461	.359	.778	2.5	2.2	0.7	0.0	1.8	2.8	16.3
Jackie Young	6	6	30.5	.375	.359	.818	5.8	3.0	0.8	0.3	1.2	2.5	13.8
Chelsea Gray	6	6	32.0	.383	.286	.818	2.7	6.2	0.7	1.0	2.8	1.0	10.5
Tiffany Hayes	6	0	21.7	.512	.500	.813	3.5	2.8	1.8	0.2	1.0	2.7	10.5
Alysha Clark	6	3	25.8	.364	.333	1.000	3.8	2.0	0.7	0.2	0.7	2.8	6.0
Kierstan Bell	1	0	3.0	.500	—	—	0.0	0.0	0.0	0.0	0.0	0.0	2.0
Sydney Colson	6	0	4.7	.143	.167	.500	0.0	0.5	0.2	0.2	0.7	0.5	0.7
Megan Gustafson	4	0	7.5	.200	.000	—	0.5	0.3	0.0	0.0	0.3	0.3	0.5
Kiah Stokes	4	3	13.8	.000	.000	—	4.8	0.0	0.0	0.3	0.8	1.5	0.0
Queen Egbo	1	0	3.0	—	—	—	1.0	1.0	0.0	0.0	0.0	1.0	0.0
Kate Martin	1	0	3.0	—	—	—	0.0	0.0	0.0	0.0	0.0	0.0	0.0

== Awards and honors ==
Recipient	Award	Date awarded	Ref.
Chelsea Gray	WNBA All-Star	July 2, 2024	
Becky Hammon	Coach of the Month – September	September 20, 2024	
Tiffany Hayes	AP Sixth Woman of the Year	September 22, 2024	
Tiffany Hayes	WNBA Sixth Player of the Year	October 4, 2024	
Kelsey Plum	WNBA All-Star	July 2, 2024	
A'ja Wilson	Western Conference Player of the Month – May	June 3, 2024	
A'ja Wilson	Western Conference Player of the Week	June 4, 2024	
A'ja Wilson	Western Conference Player of the Week	June 25, 2024	
A'ja Wilson	Western Conference Player of the Week	July 9, 2024	
A'ja Wilson	Western Conference Player of the Week	July 18, 2024	
A'ja Wilson	Western Conference Player of the Week	September 3, 2024	
A'ja Wilson	Western Conference Player of the Week	September 20, 2024	
A'ja Wilson	WNBA All-Star	July 2, 2024	
A'ja Wilson	Western Conference Player of the Month – June	July 2, 2024	
A'ja Wilson	Western Conference Player of the Month – July	July 19, 2024	
A'ja Wilson	AP Player of the Week	September 3, 2024	
A'ja Wilson	Western Conference Player of the Month – September	September 20, 2024	
A'ja Wilson	Peak Performer: Points	September 20, 2024	
A'ja Wilson	WNBA Most Valuable Player	September 22, 2024	
A'ja Wilson	AP Player of the Year	September 22, 2024	
A'ja Wilson	AP All-WNBA First Team	September 22, 2024	
A'ja Wilson	WNBA All-Defensive First Team	September 29, 2024	
A'ja Wilson	All-WNBA First Team	October 16, 2024	
Jackie Young	WNBA All-Star	July 2, 2024	
