= Dyaisha Fair =

American basketball player (born 2001)

Personal information
- Born: August 7, 2001 (age 25) Rochester, New York, U.S.
- Listed height: 5 ft 5 in (1.65 m)
- Listed weight: 130 lb (59 kg)

Career information
- High school: Edison Tech (Rochester, New York)
- College: Buffalo (2019–2022); Syracuse (2022–2024)
- WNBA draft: 2024: 2nd round, 16th overall pick
- Drafted by: Las Vegas Aces
- Playing career: 2024–present
- Position: Point guard
- Number: 2

Career history
- 2024: Las Vegas Aces
- 2024: Al Ula Club

Career highlights
- Third-team All-American – AP, USBWA (2024); 2x First-team All-ACC (2023, 2024); ACC All-Defensive team (2023); MAC Tournament MVP (2022); 2× First-team All-MAC (2020, 2021); MAC All-Defensive team (2021); MAC Newcomer of the Year (2020); MAC All-Freshman team (2020)
- Stats at Basketball Reference

Dyaisha Cheryce Fair (born August 7, 2001) is an American professional basketball player who is a free agent. Fair was the 16th overall pick in the 2024 WNBA draft. She played college basketball at the University at Buffalo and Syracuse University, finishing her career third among the NCAA Division I women's basketball career scoring leaders and having played the most minutes ever in NCAA Division I women's basketball history. In the fall of 2024, she played for AL ULA, a professional women's basketball club based in Saudi Arabia. She was then signed by AL AHLY, based in Cairo, which is part of the Egypt Superleague.

== Early life ==
Fair attended Edison Tech High School in Rochester, New York. In her senior season she averaged 33.5 points, 10.0 rebounds, and 8.0 assists per game. Notable achievements include being named the All-Greater Rochester Player of the Year, Ronald-McDonald All-Star Team, 2018 New York State Sportswriters Association All-State Team honorable mention, and setting school and sectional records for points scored and three-pointers made.

== College career ==
=== Freshman season ===
In her debut season with the Buffalo Bulls, Fair earned accolades such as Mid-American Conference Freshman of the Year and Mid-American Conference East Player of the Week honors four times. She averaged 22.0 points, 5.9 rebounds, 3.5 assists, and 2.8 steals per game. She also had the highest field goal attempts in NCAA Division I women's basketball, was top five in active points and scoring average and most points and points per game in the MAC conference. Noteworthy achievements include recording a career-high 36 points and 11 rebounds on March 11, 2020, in a game against Kent State during the Mid-American Conference Tournament quarterfinals and her first career double-double on November 5, 2019, against Central Connecticut State with 24 points. Her performance earned her recognition on various watch lists, such as Dawn Staley Award and Her Hoop Stats Mid-Major Player of the Year award.

=== Sophomore season ===
Her second season with Buffalo was played largely without attendance at home and three postponed home games due to the COVID-19 pandemic. She started all 24 games played and was named first Team All-MAC and All-Defensive Team. Averaging 24.1 points, 6.0 rebounds, 5.1 assists, and 2.9 steals per game, she led the Bulls in scoring in 22 out of 24 games, and also topped the team in assists and steals. She also held the highest active scoring average in NCAA Division I women's basketball. Fair had 23 games in double figures, including 19 with 20 or more points and five with 30 or more points. She became the fastest player in Buffalo program history and the 14th fastest in Division I women’s basketball history to reach 1,000 career points, achieving this feat in her 44th career collegiate game. She recorded the program’s first triple-double in nearly two decades with 28 points, 12 rebounds, and 10 assists in a victory over Akron on December 13, 2020. Throughout the season she also tied her career high of 36 points twice. Finishing the season ranked sixth in the nation in scoring, she also ranked in the top 25 in various statistical categories, including free throws made, steals, and assists. Fair's achievements earned her recognition as one of the 10 finalists for the Nancy Lieberman Award, as well as placements on the late-season watch lists for the Dawn Staley Award

=== Junior season ===
In her third and final season at Buffalo, Fair led the team to their first NCAA Division I women's basketball tournament appearance since 2019. Averaging 23.4 points per game, the 2021-2022 season comprised her highest minutes per game at 37.4, field goal percentage at 40.4%, 3 point field goal percentage at 36.8%, and total points at 796. During the season she scored in double figures 31 times, 24 times with 20 or more points and seven times with 30 or more points. She also held top five career leadership in points, scoring average, 3 point field goal attempts per game, and was top again in field goal attempts. Fair scored the most points in her conference at 796 and points per game at 23.4 for the second time in her career. She was honored with an All-MAC First Team and All-Defensive Team honors, as well as MAC Tournament MVP after averaging a team-best 25.7 points, 4.3 rebounds, 5.7 assists and 3.3 steals. Fair was named an honorable mention All-American by the Associated Press, was on the late season watch list for the Dawn Staley Award, the Nancy Lieberman Award watch list, and as one of the 10 semifinalists for the Becky Hammon Mid-Major Player of the Year Award. In the Bulls first round NCAA Tournament loss to Tennessee, Fair scored 25 points, five rebounds, seven assists and two steals.

=== Senior season ===
Following her junior season, she transferred to Syracuse University, following her Bulls coach, Felisha Legette Jack. With them, transferred fellow players, Dominique Camp, Cheyenne McEvans, Saniaa Wilson, and Georgia Wooley, and coaches Kristen Sharkey and Khyreed Carter. These transfers immediately made an impact on the team's performance with 9 more total wins than the previous year and an appearance in the 2023 Women's National Invitation Tournament Quarterfinal.

Fair was also extremely successful on the court, starting all 33 games for the Orange, averaging 19.9 points and 3.5 rebounds per game. She tied her season-high of 36 points while tying a program record of eight made three-pointers against Virginia on January 26, 2023 and logged a high of 40 minutes in five games. Fair led the ACC in steals per game with 2.4 and shot 39.8 percent from the field, 81.8 percent from the free-throw line, and 36.2 percent from three-point range. She amassed a total of 656 points during the season and reached 2500 career points against Boston College on February 5, 2023, joining Caitlin Clark as the only two active Division I Women's Basketball players to reach that level at the time. She was also placed as an active career leader in 6 categories, points, scoring average, steals, field goals made, 3 point field goals attempted per game, and as number one in field goals attempted. In the postseason WNIT, she averaged 21.3 points per game. Her continued performance in a power conference garnered recognition as she was named First Team All-ACC and on the All-ACC Defensive Team, as well as a Women's Basketball Coaches Association All-America Honorable Mention.

Following the season, Fair was selected compete at the 2023 3x3 U23 Nations League for the U.S. National Team.

=== Graduate student season ===
In her final season at Syracuse, the team improved greatly, spending multiple weeks in the AP top 25 Poll with a season high at number 17. On December 18, 2023, in a game against Cornell University, Fair joined the list of the Top 25 NCAA Division I women's basketball career scoring leaders. Throughout the season, she continued to climb, scoring 3,000 career points on January 14, 2024, against Cornell University. A season high of 38 points was reached at Boston College on February 4, 2024 and a career high 9 3-point field goals made playing Florida State on January 18, 2024. The team finished the regular season at 23-6 (13-5 in the ACC) with Fair leading the team in points, assists, steals, and 3-point percentage.

In her last home game of the regular season at the JMA Wireless Dome against Pittsburgh on February 25, 2024, she passed Brittney Griner for fifth on the NCAA Division I women's basketball career scoring leaders list. After her last regular season game she had 3,328 total points and 3,351 points following the 2024 ACC women's basketball tournament. She led her team to her second NCAA Tournament appearance with a sixth seed matchup in the 2024 NCAA Division I women's basketball tournament against Arizona in the Portland Regional 3 at Harry A. Gampel Pavilion in Storrs, CT. During this first round game, Fair score a game high 32 points with a 50% Field goal percentage and created an 11-0 scoring run in the end of the fourth quarter resulting in a 74-69 win over Arizona. In her last college game, Syracuse played the regional host, 3 seeded UConn Huskies, with an early scoring drought causing an eventual 64-72 loss. Fair put up 20 points with 4 three-pointers, moving into her final place as third in the NCAA Division I women's basketball career scoring leaders list. The Orange ended the season at number 20 in the AP postseason poll.

Following the NCAA Tournament, Fair was invited to participate in the 2024 State Farm Slam Dunk Women's 3-Point Championship. In the first round, she scored a total of 16 points tying for third place with Unique Drake of the St John's Red Storm. In the second round, Fair put up 17 points, beating Drake by 6, but was ultimately eliminated from the final round due to tiebreaker rules involving total shots made, in a three way tie with Sara Scalia of the Indiana Hoosiers and Hayley Frank of the Missouri Tigers. She also competed in 2024 Women's College All-Star Game, scoring 19 points, propelling a comeback and scoring the game winning shot for her team.

Fair was named ACC Player of the Week twice, Preseason Top 50 John R. Wooden Award Watch List, 2023-24 Jersey Mike's Naismith Women's Player of the Year Watch List, Preseason All-ACC Team, 2024 Nancy Lieberman Award Watch List, U.S. Basketball Writers Association Players of the Week twice, Ann Meyers Drysdale Award Watch List, Naismith Player of the Week, ESPN Player of the week, and 2024 Jersey Mike's Naismith Trophy Women's Player of the Year Midseason Team. She was declared All-ACC First Team and runner up for ACC Player of the Year. Following the season, she was named Third Team All-American by the Associated Press, The Sporting News and the U.S. Basketball Writers Association. Fair was also invited to attend the 2024 WNBA Draft.

== Professional career ==
=== 3x3 U23 USA Team ===
On July 17, 2023, Fair was a selected for the USA Basketball 3x3 U23 Nations League Team, which took part in the FIBA 3x3 Nations League Americas conference from July 24 to 30 in Rancagua, Chile. The team won the top spot in their conference, earning the USA a spot in the Nations League Final.

She also participated in the U23 Women’s World Cup in late September, 2023, in Lublin, Poland in which the team went 2-2 in Pool A and finished in 11th place. Fair scored a total of 19 points during those games.

=== WNBA ===
Fair was selected in the second round as the 16th overall in the 2024 WNBA draft by the Las Vegas Aces. On April 17, 2024, Fair was signed to the Aces' rookie scale contract.

In April 2024, days after being drafted by the Aces and prior to the start of their training camp, Fair attended Kelsey Plum's second annual Dawg Class, a 3-day camp with the purpose of helping top women college athletes transition from collegiate to professional basketball. The 2024 camp was held at the IMG Academy and sponsored by Under Armour.

On May 13, 2024, Fair was named to the 2024 Las Vegas Aces roster. She made her WNBA regular season debut on May 25, 2024, in a 99–80 home win against the Indiana Fever, registering 2 assists in 4 minutes played. However, she was waived by the Aces the following day.

=== Saudi-Arabia ===
On July 18th, 2024, a person with sources close to Fair confirmed a short move to Saudi-Arabia to play for the women's basketball division of Al-Ula Club via their Twitter "Steve Infanti", before Fair is set to join Israeli side Maccabi Haifa.

=== Israel ===
On June 16th, 2024, it was confirmed by the Women's Basketball League of Israel's Instagram account that Fair has signed a contract with women's club Maccabi Haifa for their 2024/2025 season, which was later on confirmed by Dyaisha Fair herself via her Instagram story.

== Career statistics ==
Legend
GP	Games played	GS	Games started	MPG	Minutes per game	FG%	Field goal percentage	3P%	3-point field goal percentage
FT%	Free throw percentage	RPG	Rebounds per game	APG	Assists per game	SPG	Steals per game	BPG	Blocks per game
TO	Turnovers per game	PPG	Points per game	**Bold**	Career high	°	League leader	*	Led Division I

=== WNBA ===
==== Regular season ====
Stats current through end of 2024 season

WNBA regular season statistics
Year	Team	GP	GS	MPG	FG%	3P%	FT%	RPG	APG	SPG	BPG	TO	PPG
2024	Las Vegas	1	0	3.9	.000	.000	–	0.0	2.0	0.0	0.0	0.0	0.0
**Career**	1 year, 1 team	1	0	3.9	.000	.000	–	0.0	2.0	0.0	0.0	0.0	0.0

=== College ===
NCAA statistics
Year	Team	GP	GS	MPG	FG%	3P%	FT%	RPG	APG	SPG	BPG	TO	PPG
2019–20	Buffalo	30	26	36.1	.372	.314	.718	5.9	3.5	2.8	0.1	**4.1**	22.0
2020–21	Buffalo	24	24	36.4	.365	.316	.810	**6.0**	**5.1**	**2.9**	0.1	2.8	**24.1**
2021–22	Buffalo	**34**	**34**	**37.4**	**.404**	.368	.816	4.9	4.4	2.1	0.1	2.0	23.4
2022–23	Syracuse	33	33	35.8	.398	.362	**.818**	3.5	4.2	2.4	0.1	2.0	19.9
2023–24	Syracuse	32	30	37.4	.392	**.377**	.796	4.6	3.6	2.4	**0.2**	2.1	22.3
**Career**		153	147	36.6	.387	.350	.791	4.9	4.1	2.5	0.1	2.5	22.2

== Personal life ==
In April 2024, Fair was invited to Kelsey Plum's Dawg Class, an Under Armour-sponsored camp to help top women college athletes transition from collegiate to professional basketball.

== See also ==
- List of NCAA Division I women's basketball career scoring leaders
