= Alysha Clark =

American basketball player (born 1987)

Alysha Clark אלישה קלארק
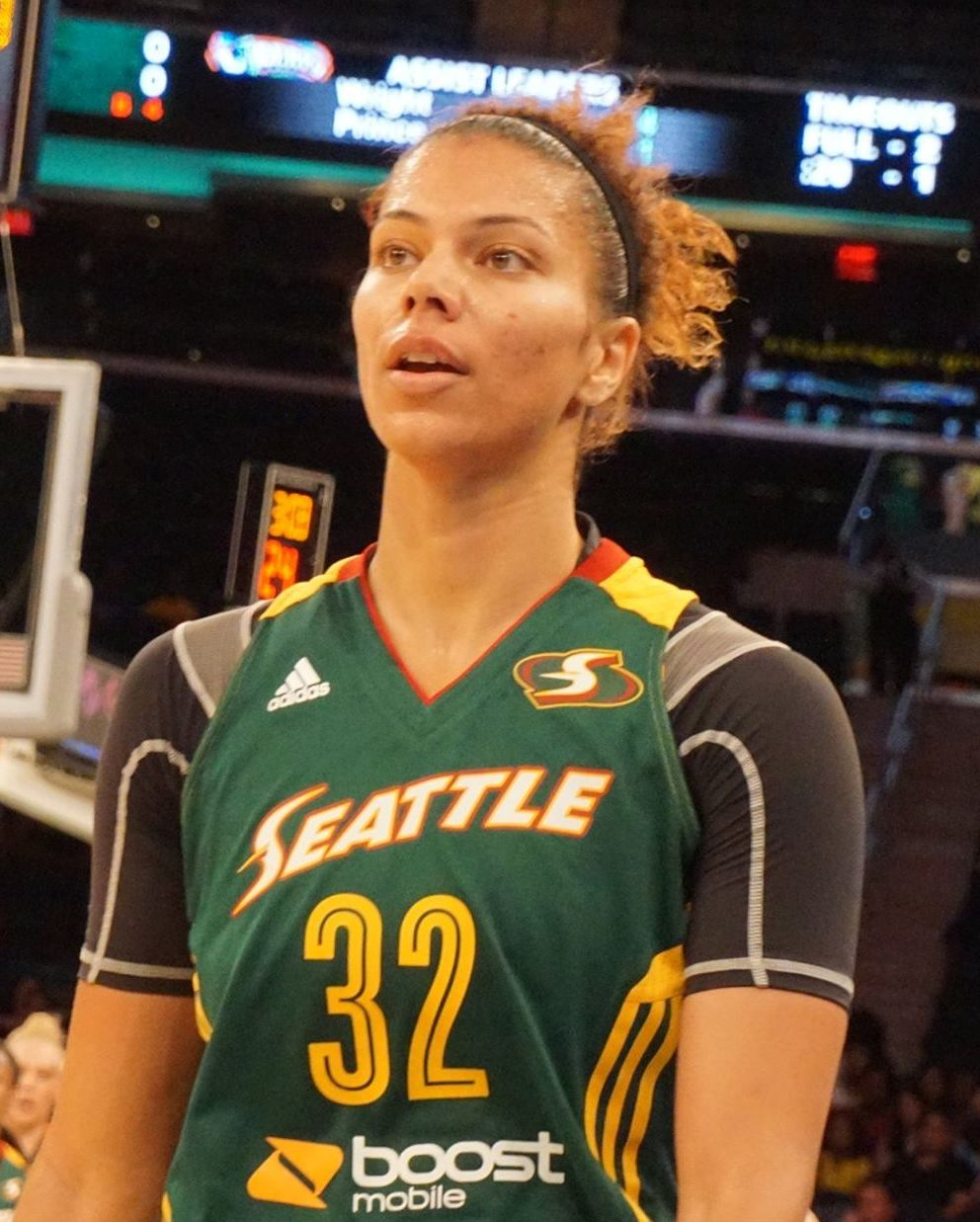
- Clark at Madison Square Garden in 2015

No. 7 – Dallas Wings
- Position: Small forward
- League: WNBA

Personal information
- Born: July 7, 1987 (age 39) Denver, Colorado, U.S.
- Listed height: 5 ft 11 in (1.80 m)
- Listed weight: 167 lb (76 kg)

Career information
- High school: Mount Juliet (Mount Juliet, Tennessee)
- College: Belmont (2005–2007); Middle Tennessee (2008–2010)
- WNBA draft: 2010: 2nd round, 17th overall pick
- Drafted by: San Antonio Silver Stars
- Playing career: 2010–present

Career history
- 2012–2020: Seattle Storm
- 2010–2011: Hapoel Rishon LeZion
- 2011–2013: A.S. Ramat HaSharon
- 2014–2016: Maccabi Bnot Ashdod
- 2016–2017: Adana ASKİ SK
- 2017–2018: CCC Polkowice
- 2018–2022: ASVEL
- 2022: Washington Mystics
- 2022–2023: Elitzur Ramla
- 2023–2024: Las Vegas Aces
- 2025: Seattle Storm
- 2025: Washington Mystics
- 2026–present: Dallas Wings

Career highlights
- 3× WNBA champion (2018, 2020, 2023); WNBA Sixth Player of the Year (2023); WNBA All-Defensive First Team (2020); WNBA All-Defensive Second Team (2019); 3× Israeli champion (2015, 2016, 2023); Ligue Féminine de Basketball champion (2019); Basket Liga Kobiet MVP (2018); All-American – USBWA (2010); Second-team All-American – AP (2010); Third-team All-American – AP (2009); 2× Sun Belt Player of the Year (2009, 2010); 2× Atlantic Sun Player of the Year (2006, 2007); 2× Sun Belt Tournament MVP (2009, 2010); First-team All-Sun Belt; 3× First-team All-ASUN (2006, 2007, 2009); ASUN Freshman of the Year (2006); ASUN All-Freshman Team (2006); 2× NCAA season scoring leader (2009, 2010); Class AAA Tennessee Miss Basketball (2005)
- Stats at WNBA.com
- Stats at Basketball Reference

Alysha Angelica Clark (Hebrew: אלישה קלארק; born July 7, 1987) is an American-Israeli professional basketball player for the Dallas Wings of the Women's National Basketball Association (WNBA) and Athletes Unlimited Pro Basketball. In college, she led the NCAA in scoring three years in a row. She was drafted in the second round of the 2010 WNBA draft by the San Antonio Silver Stars. In 2018, Clark won a championship with the Seattle Storm as they swept the Mystics in the 2018 WNBA Finals, and in 2020 won her second championship as the Storm swept the Las Vegas Aces. She won her third WNBA championship with the Las Vegas Aces in 2023. In 2018, she led CCC Polkowice to a Polish championship and was named the league's Most Valuable Player. The next year, she won a Ligue Féminine de Basketball championship with her French team, Lyon Asvel. Clark is known for her swarming defense and clutch shooting.

== Early life ==
Clark was born in Denver, Colorado to Jan and Duane Clark, who were both musicians. She is the younger sister of American Idol contestant Corey Clark. Clark's maternal grandparents were Jewish and could speak Hebrew. However, she was baptized as a child and identified as a Christian. It was not until she began playing in Israel that she was considered Jewish (her maternal grandparents were Jewish). She subsequently began to explore her Jewish roots and became an Israeli citizen.

The family later moved to her hometown of Mount Juliet, Tennessee, where she attended Mt. Juliet High School. There, she played basketball, and as a senior averaged 24 points and 11.6 rebounds, while shooting 78 percent from the foul line and 67 percent from the floor. She was named an AAU All-American, the 3A Miss Basketball, picked by the Tennessean as its Midstate Player of the Year, voted to the Girl's All-Southern Basketball Team by the Orlando Sentinel, named the Tennessee Gatorade Player of the Year, named to the Tennessee All-Star Team, named Tennessee tournament Most Valuable Player.

== College career ==
Clark played her first two years of college basketball at Belmont University in Nashville, Tennessee. At Belmont she helped the Lady Bruins (Note: Belmont has since dropped "Lady" from its women's team nicknames.) to their first ever NCAA tournament appearance in 2007. As a freshman, she led the conference in total points, field goals, and free throws, and was named Atlantic Sun Conference (ASUN) Player of the Year and Freshman of the Year, selected to the All-Atlantic Sun First Team and to the league's All-Freshman Team, and was named to the Atlantic Sun All-Tournament Team. In 2006–07 she led the ASUN with 17.0 points per game, 12.6 rebounds per game, and a .580 field goal percentage. She was named the Atlantic Sun Player of the Year for the second year in a row, and the Atlantic Sun Tournament Most Valuable Player.

After two years she transferred to Middle Tennessee State University. Clark sat out the 2007–08 season, as then required by NCAA rules for transfer students. (Note: Since the 2021–22 school year, first-time transfer students in Division I baseball, basketball, football, and men's ice hockey have been allowed to play immediately after transferring. This change placed those sports under the same rules that had long applied in all other Division I sports, as well as Divisions II and III.) In 2008–09, she led the NCAA with 27.3 points and led the Sun Belt Conference with 9.8 rebounds per game, led the conference and was 4th in the NCAA with a .609 field goal percentage, was 2nd in the conference with a .787 free throw percentage, and was 4th in the conference with 2.1 steals per game. She was named the Tennessee Sports Writers Association Player of the Year, and the Sun Belt Player of the Year and Newcomer of the Year. Clark became the first women's basketball player ever to be named Player of the Year in two different Division I conferences. (Note: Three men have been player of the year in two Division I conferences. First, Granger Hall earned the honor in the East Coast Conference in 1982 (the defunct D-I conference, not the current D-II East Coast Conference) and Atlantic 10 Conference in 1985 at Temple. Next, Charleston's Sedric Webber was Player of the Year in the ASUN in 1998, when it was known as the Trans America Athletic Conference, and the Southern Conference in 1999. Most recently, Creighton's Doug McDermott earned the honor in the Missouri Valley Conference in 2012 and 2013, as well as the Big East Conference in 2014.)

In 2009–10 she again led the NCAA, this time with 28.3 points per game, led the Sun Belt Conference with 11.6 rebounds per game, was 4th in the conference with 2.4 steals per game, and was 9th in the conference with 3.4 assists per game. In her two seasons with the school she led NCAA Division I in scoring both seasons, was named to eight All-America teams, and was the Sun Belt Conference Player of the Year and Most Valuable Player of the Sun Belt Championships in 2009 and 2010. She was named to the Middle Tennessee Hall of Fame in 2020.

== Professional career ==
Clark was drafted with the 17th overall pick in the second round of the 2010 WNBA draft by the San Antonio Silver Stars, but did not make a roster that year or in 2011.

Besides playing in the WNBA, she played during the off season for Ramat Hasharon of the Israeli National League from 2010 to 2013 (and was awarded the Domestic Player of the Year Award and selected to the All-Israeli First team during her first year). In the 2014–15 and 2015–16 seasons, she played for the Maccabi Ashdod, and was named the Player of the Year, Forward of the Year, and a First Team all-star. Clark then played in Turkey followed by Poland for the next two years. In 2018–19 and 2019–20, she played in France.

In 2012, she signed with the Seattle Storm. In 2019, she was named to the All-Defensive Second Team and in 2020 was chosen for the All-Defensive First Team.

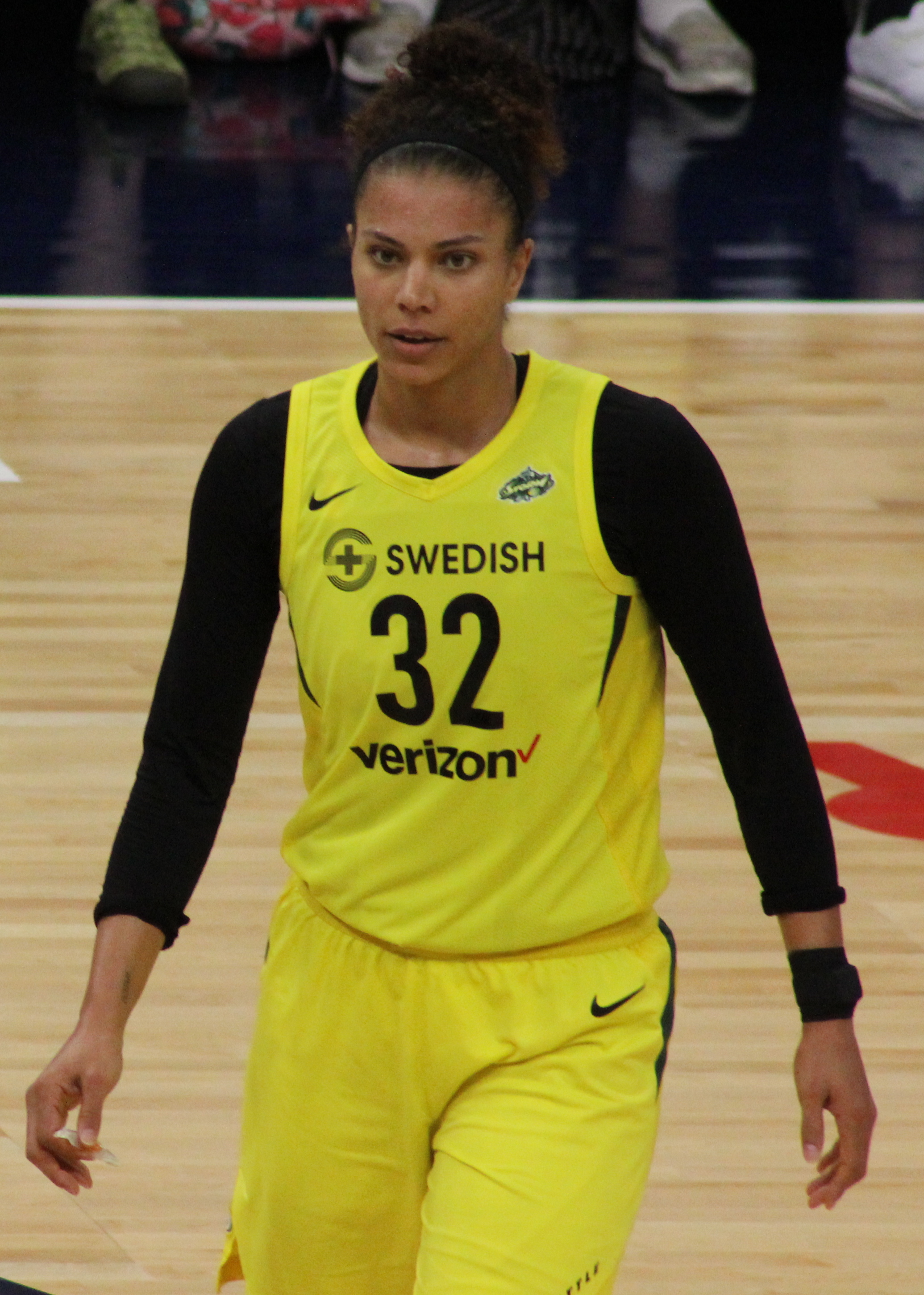
Clark in 2018

In 2018, Clark started every game of the Storm's WNBA Championship run. In Seattle's Western Conference Finals series against the Phoenix Mercury, Clark was the Storm's main choice to guard Diana Taurasi, and in the decisive Game 5, she also logged a double-double with 13 points and a team-high 13 rebounds. In the Storm's championship-clinching win in the WNBA Finals against the Washington Mystics, Clark led the team in playing time, and added 15 points.

In February 2021, Clark signed with the Washington Mystics, but was ruled out of playing during the 2021 WNBA season due to a Lisfranc injury received while playing in France.

In December 2022, Clark signed with the Israeli champions Elitzur Ramla, until the end of the season. She went back to training under Shira Halyon, who trained her in the past in the EuroCup.

In February 2023, Clark signed with the Las Vegas Aces. On September 18, 2023, she won the WNBA Sixth Player of the Year Award.

On February 9, 2025, Clark signed with the Seattle Storm, where she played the first nine years of her WNBA career.

On August 5, 2025, Clark was traded back to the Washington Mystics, as Washington acquired Clark and Seattle's 2026 first-round draft pick in exchange for Brittney Sykes.

Clark signed a one-year deal with the Dallas Wings in April 2026. She signed the contract while being the oldest active WNBA player.

=== Athletes Unlimited ===
Clark made her Athletes Unlimited Pro Basketball debut during the league's 2025 season, finishing 15th on the overall leaderboard and earning selection to the AU All-Defensive Team. She started all 12 games, averaging 10.2 points and 6.5 rebounds, and recorded multiple Game MVP honors, including a double-double performance during the season. Clark is set to return to the league for the 2026 season.

== Career statistics ==
Legend
| GP | Games played | GS | Games started | MPG | Minutes per game | FG% | Field goal percentage |
| 3P% | 3-point field goal percentage | FT% | Free throw percentage | RPG | Rebounds per game | APG | Assists per game |
| SPG | Steals per game | BPG | Blocks per game | TO | Turnovers per game | PPG | Points per game |
| **Bold** | Career high | * | Led Division I | ° | Led the league | ‡ | WNBA record |

| † | Denotes seasons in which Clark won a WNBA championship |

=== WNBA ===
==== Regular season ====
WNBA regular season statistics
| Year | Team | GP | GS | MPG | FG% | 3P% | FT% | RPG | APG | SPG | BPG | TO | PPG |
|---|---|---|---|---|---|---|---|---|---|---|---|---|---|
| 2010 | Did not play (waived) | | | | | | | | | | | | |
| 2011 | Did not play (waived) | | | | | | | | | | | | |
| 2012 | Seattle | 23 | 0 | 10.3 | .547 | .450 | .706 | 2.0 | .3 | .2 | .1 | .8 | 3.4 |
| 2013 | Seattle | 33 | 0 | 15.3 | .453 | .390 | .760 | 2.5 | .4 | .4 | .2 | 1.1 | 4.0 |
| 2014 | Seattle | 34° | 22 | 16.5 | .448 | .246 | .696 | 2.1 | .6 | .5 | .3 | .7 | 4.2 |
| 2015 | Seattle | 33 | 31 | 23.1 | .544 | .353 | .775 | 3.7 | 1.2 | .7 | .2 | 1.1 | 6.9 |
| 2016 | Seattle | 33 | 32 | 27.6 | .484 | .387 | .847 | 3.7 | 1.9 | .7 | .1 | 1.3 | 9.0 |
| 2017 | Seattle | 33 | **33** | 28.3 | .525 | .328 | .745 | 4.2 | 1.6 | .7 | .1 | 1.0 | 8.2 |
| 2018^{†} | Seattle | 31 | 30 | 26.2 | .480 | .392 | .846 | 3.5 | 1.9 | 1.0 | .1 | 1.2 | 7.4 |
| 2019 | Seattle | 31 | 30 | 28.4 | .481 | .481 | .818 | **4.7** | 2.5 | 1.1 | **.5** | 1.5 | 9.6 |
| 2020^{†} | Seattle | 22° | 22° | **28.8** | **.558** | **.522** | .800 | 4.2 | **2.7** | **1.5** | **.5** | .9 | **10.0** |
| 2021 | Did not play (injury) | | | | | | | | | | | | |
| 2022 | Washington | 29 | 29 | 26.4 | .464 | .303 | **.913** | 4.5 | 2.0 | .9 | .3 | 1.3 | 8.0 |
| 2023^{†} | Las Vegas | 39 | 1 | 22.5 | .444 | .386 | .818 | 3.4 | 1.1 | .6 | .2 | .7 | 6.7 |
| 2024 | Las Vegas | **40** | 18 | 24.3 | .443 | .373 | .821 | 3.6 | 1.8 | .8 | .3 | 1.4 | 6.0 |
| 2025 | Seattle | 27 | 7 | 18.0 | .378 | .291 | .846 | 2.4 | 1.0 | .7 | .1 | .6 | 3.5 |
| 2025 | Washington | 15 | 8 | 22.9 | .362 | .244 | .615 | 3.5 | 1.5 | .5 | .1 | **.3** | 4.5 |
| 2026 | Dallas | 30 | 1 | 11.4 | .407 | .350 | .654 | 1.7 | .7 | .2 | .3 | .5 | 2.6 |
| **Career** | 14 years, 4 teams | 453 | 264 | 22.1 | .475 | .372 | .787 | 3.3 | 1.4 | .7 | .2 | 1.0 | 6.3 |

==== Playoffs ====
WNBA playoff statistics
| Year | Team | GP | GS | MPG | FG% | 3P% | FT% | RPG | APG | SPG | BPG | TO | PPG |
|---|---|---|---|---|---|---|---|---|---|---|---|---|---|
| 2013 | Seattle | 2 | 0 | 18.5 | .455 | .333 | **1.000** | 5.0 | .5 | .0 | .7 | **.5** | 7.0 |
| 2016 | Seattle | 1 | 1 | 28.0 | .333 | .000 | **1.000** | 2.0 | 3.0 | .0 | .0 | 1.0 | 8.0 |
| 2017 | Seattle | 1 | 1 | 26.0 | .667 | – | **1.000** | 5.0 | .0 | 1.0 | **1.0** | 1.0 | 6.0 |
| 2018^{†} | Seattle | 8 | **8** | **35.0** | .500 | .458 | .875 | 5.9 | 2.6 | .5 | .3 | .6 | 8.5 |
| 2019 | Seattle | 2 | 2 | 28.5 | .143 | .200 | .857 | 3.5 | 1.0 | **2.0** | .5 | 2.5 | 4.5 |
| 2020^{†} | Seattle | 6 | 6 | 30.5 | .453 | .348 | **1.000** | **6.5** | **3.2** | .7 | .7 | .7 | **10.3** |
| 2022 | Washington | 2 | 2 | 25.5 | .571 | .500 | .667 | 3.5 | 3.0 | 1.5 | .5 | **.5** | 6.0 |
| 2023^{†} | Las Vegas | **9** | 1 | 24.1 | .529 | .318 | .929 | 4.4 | 1.3 | .3 | .1 | 1.0 | 8.2 |
| 2024 | Las Vegas | 6 | 3 | 25.8 | .364 | .333 | **1.000** | 3.8 | 2.0 | .7 | .2 | .7 | 6.0 |
| 2026 | Dallas | 3 | 0 | 25.0 | **.818** | **.600** | .875 | 4.7 | 1.0 | .0 | .0 | .7 | 9.3 |
| **Career** | 10 years, 4 teams | 40 | 24 | 27.7 | .477 | .370 | .914 | 4.9 | 2.0 | .6 | .3 | .8 | 7.9 |

=== College ===
NCAA statistics
| Year | Team | GP | GS | MPG | FG% | 3P% | FT% | RPG | APG | SPG | BPG | TO | PPG |
|---|---|---|---|---|---|---|---|---|---|---|---|---|---|
| 2005–06 | Belmont | 30 | — | 31.6 | .543 | .227 | .745 | 10.9 | 1.3 | 1.7 | .5 | **3.0** | 20.0 |
| 2006–07 | Belmont | 30 | — | 29.1 | .580 | .364 | .744 | **12.7** | 1.9 | 2.2 | .5 | 3.5 | 17.0 |
| 2007–08 | Middle Tennessee | Did not play (NCAA transfer rules) | | | | | | | | | | | |
| 2008–09 | Middle Tennessee | **34** | — | 34.4 | .607 | **.414** | **.790** | 9.8 | 2.1 | 2.1 | .6 | 3.9 | 27.5* |
| 2009–10 | Middle Tennessee | 29 | 29 | **35.1** | **.614** | .321 | .777 | 11.6 | **3.4** | **2.4** | **.7** | 3.2 | **28.3*** |
| **Career** | | 123 | — | 32.6 | .590 | .333 | .766 | 11.2 | 2.2 | 2.1 | .6 | 3.4 | 23.3 |

== Off the court ==
=== Philanthropy ===
In February 2024, Clark joined the WNBA Changemakers Collective and their collaboration with VOICEINSPORT (VIS) as a mentor, "aimed at keeping girls in sport and developing diverse leaders on the court and beyond the game."

== See also ==
- List of select Jewish basketball players
- List of NCAA Division I women's basketball career scoring leaders
- List of WNBA annual 3-point field goal percentage leaders
