= 2023 WNBA Finals =

Championship series of the 2023 WNBA season

Team	Coach	Wins
Las Vegas Aces	Becky Hammon	3
New York Liberty	Sandy Brondello	1
- Dates: October 8 – 18
- MVP: A'ja Wilson
- Hall of Famers: Aces: Candace Parker (2026)
- Eastern finals: New York Liberty defeated Connecticut Sun 3–1 (Note: the semifinal rounds as of 2016 were not divided by conference)
- Western finals: Las Vegas Aces defeated Dallas Wings 3–0

The 2023 WNBA Finals, officially the WNBA Finals 2023 presented by YouTube TV for sponsorship reasons, was the best-of-five championship series for the 2023 season of the Women's National Basketball Association (WNBA). The finals featured the first-seeded Las Vegas Aces facing off against the second-seeded New York Liberty. The Aces defeated the Liberty in 4 games, winning their second WNBA Championship in a row. The Aces became the first team in twenty one years, and only the third in history to repeat as WNBA Champions.

== Road to the Finals ==
=== Standings ===
#	Team	W	L	PCT	GB	Conf.	Home	Road	Cup
1	**x** – Las Vegas Aces	34	6	.850	–	18–2	19–1	15–5	9–1
2	**x** – New York Liberty	32	8	.800	2	16–4	15–5	17–3	7–3
3	**x** – Connecticut Sun	27	13	.675	7	14–6	13–7	14–6	7–3
4	**x** – Dallas Wings	22	18	.550	12	11–9	11–9	11–9	6–4
5	**x** – Atlanta Dream	19	21	.475	15	11–9	11–9	8–12	6–4
6	**x** – Minnesota Lynx	19	21	.475	15	12–8	9–11	10–10	5–5
7	**x** – Washington Mystics	19	21	.475	15	9–11	12–8	7–13	5–5
8	**x** – Chicago Sky	18	22	.450	16	5–15	7–13	11–9	3–7
9	**e** – Los Angeles Sparks	17	23	.425	17	9–11	10–10	7–13	5–5
10	**e** – Indiana Fever	13	27	.325	21	5–15	6–14	7–13	2–8
11	**e** – Seattle Storm	11	29	.275	23	8–12	4–16	7–13	4–6
12	**e** – Phoenix Mercury	9	31	.225	25	2–18	8–12	1–19	1–9

Notes

(#) – League Standing
x – Clinched playoff berth
e – Eliminated from playoff contention

=== Playoffs ===
**First round** Best-of-3
**1**	**Las Vegas Aces**	**2**
8	Chicago Sky	0
**4**	**Dallas Wings**	**2**
5	Atlanta Dream	0
**2**	**New York Liberty**	**2**
7	Washington Mystics	0
**3**	**Connecticut Sun**	**2**
6	Minnesota Lynx	1

**Semifinals**; Best-of-5
**1**	**Las Vegas Aces**	**3**
4	Dallas Wings	0
**2**	**New York Liberty**	**3**
3	Connecticut Sun	1

**Finals**; Best-of-5
1	**Las Vegas Aces**	**3**
2	New York Liberty	1

- **Bold** – Series winner
- Italic – Team with home-court advantage

In November 2021, the WNBA Board of Governors formalized a new playoff system that will structure the 2022 playoffs onward. The new playoff format scraps the single-elimination games of the first two rounds in favor of a best-of-3 quarterfinal round. As a result, all eight playoff teams, seeded according to overall regular season record regardless of conference (1 vs. 8, 2 vs. 7, 3 vs. 6, 4 vs. 5), will begin postseason play in the first round. Since 2016, seeds 3 and 4 received a bye to the second round (single game) and seeds 1 and 2 received a bye to the semifinals (best-of-5). In the first round series, the higher seeded team will host games 1 and 2, and the lower seeded team will host game 3 if necessary. In the semifinal round, no reseeding will take place, which means the winners of the 1 vs. 8 series will be paired with the winner of the 4 vs. 5 series as will the winners of the 2 vs. 7 and 3 vs. 6 series. The semifinal and final rounds will remain best-of-5 series in which the higher seeded team hosts games 1, 2 and (if necessary) 5 while the lower seeded team hosts games 3 and (if necessary) 4.

The Las Vegas Aces qualified for the finals after finishing first in the regular season standings with a 34–6 regular season record. They defeated the Chicago Sky 2–0 in the first round and the Dallas Wings 3–0 in the Semifinals. This was the Ace's second straight finals appearance, and third appearance in four years. They are the defending WNBA Champions.

The New York Liberty qualified for the finals after finishing second in the regular season standings with a 32–8 regular season record. They defeated the Washington Mystics 2–0 in the first round and the Connecticut Sun 3–1 in the Semifinals. This was the Liberty's first appearance in the finals since 2002.

The Aces had an extra two days of rest coming into the finals, as their Semifinal series ended on September 29, but the Liberty had to play a fourth game in their series on October 1. The Liberty have had to play one games in their Semifinal rounds. The teams played four times in the regular season, with the teams splitting the series 2–2. The teams also met in the Commissioners Cup Final, which the Liberty won.

== Summary ==
=== Game 1 ===
The Liberty started game one off well, stealing a close first quarter 25–22. The game continued to be tight throughout the second quarter, which ended in a 24–24 tie. Therefore, the Liberty enjoyed a slim three point lead going into halftime. However, the Aces rallied behind the home crowd coming out of halftime and won the third quarter 26–16. They continued their dominance into the fourth quarter winning 27–17. Their twenty-point second half win took them to a seventeen-point game one win. The Aces only had five players score points, and four of them scored in double figures. The Aces were led by Kelsey Plum and Jackie Young who each scored twenty-six points. Chelsea Gray added twenty points and A'ja Wilson scored nineteen. The Liberty had five players score in double figures and were led by Breanna Stewart who had twenty-one points. Jonquel Jones scored sixteen points, Marine Johannès scored fourteen points, Betnijah Laney scored eleven, and Courtney Vandersloot rounded out the double digit scorers with ten points. The Liberty only had two other players score in the game. Jones continued her streak of double-doubles by recording ten rebounds. Jones now has the most double-doubles in a single postseason in WNBA history, with seven.

ABC, SN1

October 8
3:00 p.m. EST

Box Score

Las Vegas Aces 99, New York Liberty 82
Scoring by quarter: 22–25, 24–24, 26–16, 27–17
Pts: Kelsey Plum; Jackie Young (26); Rebs: A'ja Wilson (8); Asts: Chelsea Gray (9)	Pts: Breanna Stewart (21); Rebs: Jonquel Jones (10); Asts: Courtney Vandersloot (6)
Las Vegas lead series, 1-0

Michelob Ultra Arena
Attendance: 10,300
Referees: Roy Gulbeyan (Crew Chief), Tim Greene (Referee), Fatou Cissoko-Stephens (Umpire), Tiara Cruse (Alternate)

=== Game 2 ===
The Aces got off to a flying start in game two of the series, winning the first quarter by nineteen points, 38–19. The Liberty made a comeback in the second quarter, winning by eleven points, 25–14. However, it was not enough to overcome the first quarter defect and the Aces took an eight-point lead into halftime. Similarly to game one, the Aces came out of the halftime break strong and won the third quarter 28–13. The Aces took a twenty-three point lead into the fourth quarter and continued to dominate the game. The Aces won the fourth quarter by five points, 24–19. The Aces won game two by twenty-eight points and took a 2–0 series lead into the series games played in New York.

The Aces had four players score in double figures and were led by A'ja Wilson with twenty-six points. Jackie Young scored twenty-four points, Kelsey Plum scored twenty-three points and Chelsea Gray rounded out the double digit scorers with fourteen points. Wilson and Gray both recorded double-doubles in the game. Wilson by virtue of her fifteen rebounds and Gray via her eleven assists. The Liberty also had four double digit scorers and were led by Jonquel Jones with twenty-two points. Breanna Stewart scored fourteen points, Betnijah Laney added twelve points, and Sabrina Ionescu scored ten points. Stewart and Jones also scored double-doubles by having thirteen and ten rebounds, respectively.

ESPN, TSN1/4/5

October 11
9:00 p.m. EST

Box Score

Las Vegas Aces 104, New York Liberty 76
Scoring by quarter: 38–19, 14–25, 28–13, 24–19
Pts: A'ja Wilson (26); Rebs: A'ja Wilson (15); Asts: Chelsea Gray (11)	Pts: Jonquel Jones (22); Rebs: Breanna Stewart (13); Asts: Betnijah Laney (5)
Las Vegas lead series, 2-0

Michelob Ultra Arena
Attendance: 10,232
Referees: Eric Brewton (Crew Chief), Michael Price (Referee), Tiara Cruse (Umpire), Jeff Wooten (Alternate)

=== Game 3 ===
The Liberty used the home crowd to their advantage in game three and got off to a 21–18 first quarter win. In the second quarter the teams were evenly matched, and the quarter finished 22–22. Therefore, the Liberty took a three-point lead into halftime in the must-win game three. The Liberty played lock-down defense in quarter three, and won 18–10. Taking an eleven-point lead into the fourth quarter, the Liberty didn't look back and won the fourth 26–23. They won game three by fourteen points in order to stay alive in the series. This was the Liberty's first win in the WNBA Finals since 1999.

The Liberty had four players score in double figures and were led by Jonquel Jones with twenty-seven points. Breanna Stewart scored twenty points, and Betnijah Laney and Courtney Vandersloot scored twelve. Stewart had a double-double by recording twelve rebounds. This was the first game in the playoffs where Jones did not score a double-double. The Aces only had five players score points in the game, and three of them scored in double digits. They were led by Kelsey Plum with twenty-nine points. A'ja Wilson scored sixteen points, and Chelsea Gray scored eleven points. Wilson had a double-double with eleven rebounds.

ABC, SN1

October 15
3:00 p.m. EST

Box Score

New York Liberty 87, Las Vegas Aces 73
Scoring by quarter: 21–18, 22–22, 18–10, 26–23
Pts: Jonquel Jones (27); Rebs: Breanna Stewart (12); Asts: Sabrina Ionescu (11)	Pts: Kelsey Plum (29); Rebs: A'ja Wilson (11); Asts: Jackie Young (5)
Las Vegas lead series, 2-1

Barclays Center
Attendance: 17,143
Referees: Maj Forsberg (Crew Chief), Isaac Barnett (Referee), Randy Richardson (Umpire), Tim Greene (Alternate)

=== Game 4 ===
New York again faced elimination at home in game four and they started the game strongly by winning the first quarter 23–13. The Aces fought back in a closely contested second quarter and won 17–16. The Liberty took a nine-point lead into halftime. The Aces came out of halftime and played lock-down defense limiting the Liberty to only twelve points and they won the quarter 23–12. Heading into the fourth quarter the Aces held a two-point lead. The fourth quarter was a back and forth affair, with the Liberty won 18–17. However, the one point victory was not enough to secure the game and the Aces won by a point. The win secured them their second WNBA title in a row. The Aces prevailed in game four despite starting point guard Chelsea Gray missing the game due to injury.

The Aces had four players score in double figures and were led by Finals MVP A'ja Wilson with twenty-four points. Jackie Young scored sixteen points, Cayla George scored eleven and Alysha Clark added ten. Wilson recorded her third double-double in the Finals with sixteen rebounds. The Liberty also had four players score in double digits and were led by Courtney Vandersloot with nineteen points. Betnijah Laney scored fifteen points, Sabrina Ionescu scored thirteen points, regular season MVP Breanna Stewart was held to 3-17 shooting and scored ten points. Stewart recorded a double-double with fourteen rebounds.

ESPN, TSN1/3/4/5

October 18
8:00 p.m. EST

Box Score

New York Liberty 69, Las Vegas Aces 70
Scoring by quarter: 23–13, 16–17, 12–23, 18–17
Pts: Courtney Vandersloot (19); Rebs: Breanna Stewart (14); Asts: Courtney Vandersloot (6)	Pts: A'ja Wilson (24); Rebs: A'ja Wilson (16); Asts: Jackie Young (7)
Las Vegas wins WNBA Finals, 3-1

Barclays Center
Attendance: 16,851
Referees: Eric Brewton (Crew Chief), Michael Price (Referee), Tiara Cruse (Umpire), Tim Greene (Alternate)

== Team rosters ==
2023 Las Vegas Aces roster
Players
Coaches

Pos.	No.	Nat.	Name	Height	Weight	DOB	From	Yrs
F	1	(United States)	Bell, Kierstan	6' 1" (1.85m)	176 lb (80kg)	2000-03-16	Florida Gulf Coast	1
F	7	(Israel)	Clark, Alysha	5' 11" (1.8m)	167 lb (76kg)	1987-07-07	Middle Tennessee	10
C	81	(United States)	Coates, Alaina	6' 4" (1.93m)	225 lb (102kg)	1995-04-07	South Carolina	4
G	51	(United States)	Colson, Sydney	5' 8" (1.73m)	140 lb (64kg)	1989-08-06	Texas A&M	8
F/C	13	(Australia)	George, Cayla	6' 4" (1.93m)	192 lb (87kg)	1989-05-01	Australia	3
G	12	(United States)	Gray, Chelsea	5' 11" (1.8m)	170 lb (77kg)	1992-10-08	Duke	8
F/C	3	(United States)	Parker, Candace (injured)	6' 4" (1.93m)	184 lb (83kg)	1986-04-19	Tennessee	15
G	10	(United States)	Plum, Kelsey	5' 8" (1.73m)	145 lb (66kg)	1994-08-24	Washington	5
C	41	(Turkey)	Stokes, Kiah	6' 3" (1.91m)	191 lb (87kg)	1993-03-30	Connecticut	7
G	2	(United States)	Williams, Riquna	5' 6" (1.68m)	165 lb (75kg)	1990-05-28	Miami (FL)	10
F	22	(United States)	Wilson, A'ja	6' 4" (1.93m)	195 lb (88kg)	1996-08-08	South Carolina	5
G	0	(United States)	Young, Jackie	6' 0" (1.83m)	165 lb (75kg)	1997-09-16	Notre Dame	4

Head coach
(United States) Becky Hammon (Colorado State)
Assistant coaches
(United States) Natalie Nakase (UCLA)
(United States) Tyler Marsh (Birmingham–Southern)
(United States) Charlene Thomas-Swinson (Auburn)
Athletic trainer
(United States) Michelle Anumba (Duke)

Legend

- (C) Team captain
- (DP) Unsigned draft pick
- (FA) Free agent
- (S) Suspended
- Injured

=== Depth chart ===
Pos.	Starter	Bench
PG	Chelsea Gray	Sydney Colson
SG	Kelsey Plum	Riquna Williams
SF	Jackie Young	Alysha Clark; Kierstan Bell
PF	Candace Parker	Cayla George
C	A'ja Wilson	Kiah Stokes

2023 New York Liberty roster
Players
Coaches

Pos.	No.	Nat.	Name	Height	Weight	DOB	From	Yrs
C	31	(United States)	Dolson, Stefanie	6' 5" (1.96m)	235 lb (107kg)	1992-01-08	Connecticut	9
G	20	(United States)	Ionescu, Sabrina	5' 11" (1.8m)	165 lb (75kg)	1997-12-06	Oregon	3
G	23	(France)	Johannès, Marine	5' 10" (1.78m)	134 lb (61kg)	1995-01-21	France	2
F/C	35	(Bosnia and Herzegovina)	Jones, Jonquel	6' 6" (1.98m)	215 lb (98kg)	1994-01-05	George Washington	6
G/F	44	(United States)	Laney, Betnijah	6' 0" (1.83m)	166 lb (75kg)	1993-10-29	Rutgers	7
F	8	(Germany)	Sabally, Nyara	6' 5" (1.96m)	204 lb (93kg)	2000-02-26	Oregon	1
F	30	(United States)	Stewart, Breanna	6' 4" (1.93m)	170 lb (77kg)	1994-08-27	Connecticut	6
F	5	(United States)	Thornton, Kayla	6' 1" (1.85m)	188 lb (85kg)	1992-10-20	UTEP	7
G	22	(Hungary)	Vandersloot, Courtney	5' 8" (1.73m)	137 lb (62kg)	1989-02-08	Gonzaga	12
G/F	13	(United States)	Willoughby, Jocelyn	6' 0" (1.83m)	180 lb (82kg)	1998-03-25	Virginia	2
C	21	(China)	Xu, Han	6' 10" (2.08m)	193 lb (88kg)	1999-10-31	China	2

Head coach
(Australia) Sandy Brondello (Western Sydney)
Assistant coaches
(Germany) Olaf Lange
(United States) Roneeka Hodges (Florida State)
(United States) Zach O'Brien (Saint Joseph's College of Maine)
Athletic trainer
(United States) Terri Acosta
Strength and conditioning coach
(United States) Emily Zaler

Legend

- (C) Team captain
- (DP) Unsigned draft pick
- (FA) Free agent
- (S) Suspended
- Injured

=== Depth ===
Pos.	Starter	Bench
PG	Courtney Vandersloot
SG	Sabrina Ionescu	Marine Johannès
SF	Betnijah Laney	Kayla Thornton; Jocelyn Willoughby
PF	Breanna Stewart	Nyara Sabally
C	Jonquel Jones	Stefanie Dolson; Han Xu
