= WNBA Sixth Player of the Year =

Award in Basketball

The Women's National Basketball Association's Sixth Player of the Year Award is an annual Women's National Basketball Association (WNBA) award given since the 2007 WNBA season to the league's most valuable player for her team coming off the bench as a substitute—or sixth woman. A panel of sportswriters and broadcasters throughout the United States votes on the recipient. The player with the highest number of votes wins the award. To be eligible for the award, a player must come off the bench in more games than she starts.

The award was titled "Sixth Woman of the Year" through the 2020 season, with the word "Woman" replaced by "Player" in 2021.

DeWanna Bonner has won the award the most times, with three selections.

Golden State Valkyries forward Janelle Salaün is the reigning award winner, becoming the first player since its creation to win unanimously after receiving all 74 votes from the media panel.

== Winners ==
	Denotes player who is still active in the WNBA
	Inducted into the Women's Basketball Hall of Fame
	Inducted into the Naismith Memorial Basketball Hall of Fame
	Denotes player whose team won championship that year
Player (X)	Denotes the number of times the player has won
Team (X)	Denotes the number of times a player from this team has won

Season	Player	Position	Nationality	Team	Ref.
2007	Plenette Pierson	Forward	United States	Detroit Shock	
2008	Candice Wiggins	Guard	United States	Minnesota Lynx	
2009	DeWanna Bonner	Forward	United States	Phoenix Mercury	
2010	DeWanna Bonner (2)	Forward	United States	Phoenix Mercury (2)	
2011	DeWanna Bonner (3)	Forward	United States	Phoenix Mercury (3)	
2012	Renee Montgomery	Guard	United States	Connecticut Sun	
2013	Riquna Williams	Guard	United States	Tulsa Shock (2)	
2014	Allie Quigley	Guard	Hungary (Note: Denotes a player who is a United States citizen but is naturalized and represents a different country internationally.)	Chicago Sky	
2015	Allie Quigley (2)	Guard	Hungary	Chicago Sky (2)	
2016	Jantel Lavender	Forward / Center	United States	Los Angeles Sparks	
2017	Sugar Rodgers	Guard	United States	New York Liberty	
2018	Jonquel Jones	Forward	Bahamas (Note: At the time, Jones had citizenship only in The Bahamas. In 2019, she acquired citizenship in Bosnia and Herzegovina and has since played for that country's national team.)	Connecticut Sun (2)	
2019	Dearica Hamby	Forward	United States	Las Vegas Aces	
2020	Dearica Hamby (2)	Forward	United States	Las Vegas Aces (2)	
2021	Kelsey Plum	Guard	United States	Las Vegas Aces (3)	
2022	Brionna Jones	Forward	United States	Connecticut Sun (3)	
2023	Alysha Clark	Forward	Israel	Las Vegas Aces (4)	
2024	Tiffany Hayes	Guard	Azerbaijan	Las Vegas Aces (5)	
2025	Naz Hillmon	Forward	United States	Atlanta Dream	
2026	Janelle Salaün	Forward	France	Golden State Valkyries	

== Multi-time winners ==
Awards	Player	Team	Years
3	DeWanna Bonner	Phoenix Mercury	2009, 2010, 2011
2	Dearica Hamby	Las Vegas Aces	2019, 2020
2	Allie Quigley	Chicago Sky	2014, 2015

== See also ==
- List of sports awards honoring women
