= Kierstan Bell =

American basketball player (born 2000)

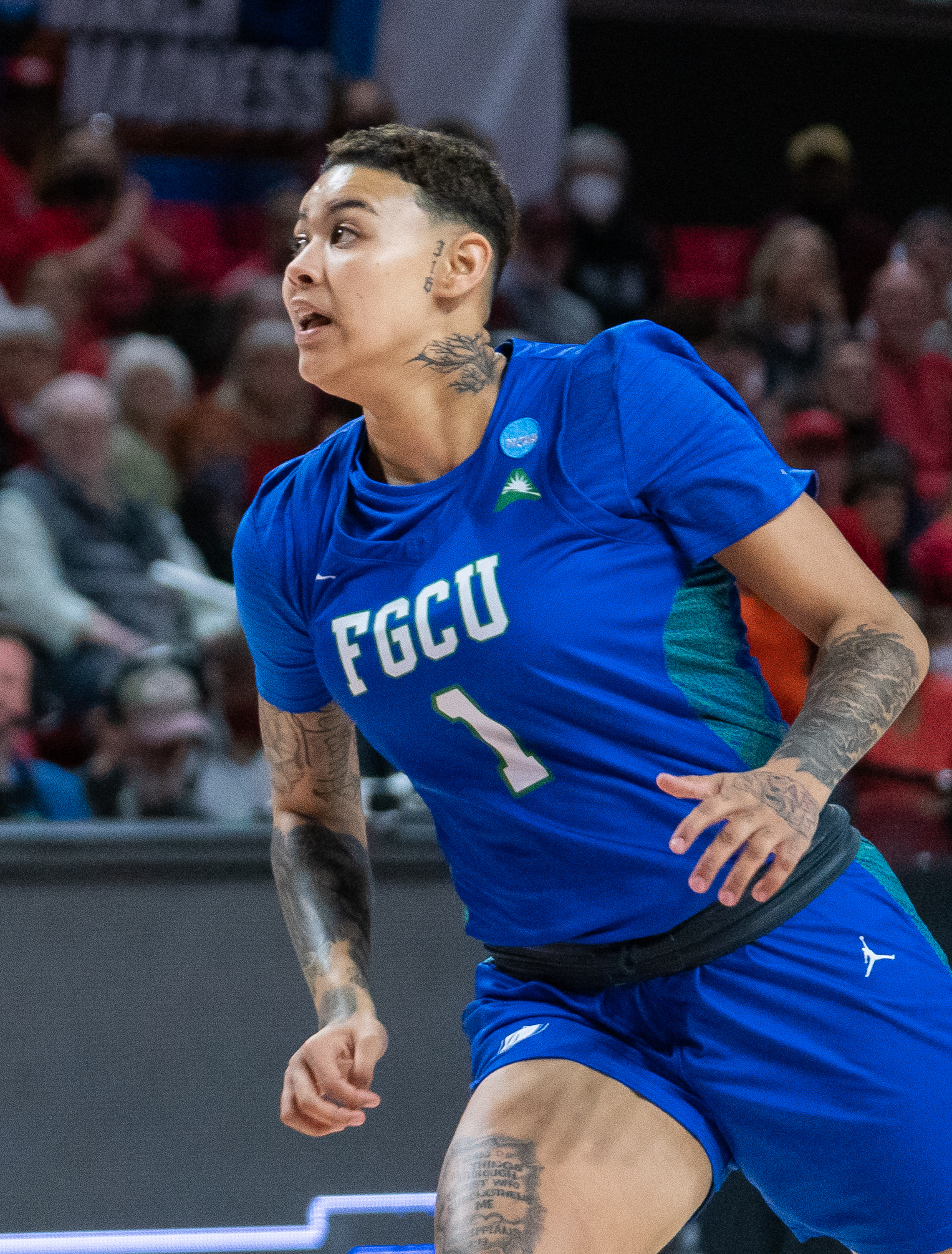
- Bell in 2022

No. 1 – Las Vegas Aces
- Position: Forward
- League: WNBA

Personal information
- Born: March 16, 2000 (age 26) Alliance, Ohio, U.S.
- Listed height: 6 ft 1 in (1.85 m)
- Listed weight: 176 lb (80 kg)

Career information
- High school: Canton McKinley (Canton, Ohio)
- College: Ohio State (2019–2020); Florida Gulf Coast (2020–2022)
- WNBA draft: 2022: 1st round, 11th overall pick
- Drafted by: Las Vegas Aces
- Playing career: 2022–present

Career history
- 2022–present: Las Vegas Aces
- 2022–2023: Adelaide Lightning
- 2023: Athletes Unlimited League

Career highlights
- 3× WNBA champion (2022, 2023, 2025); Commissioner's Cup champion (2022); 2× Honorable Mention All-American (AP, USBWA, WBCA) (2021, 2022); 2× ASUN Player of the Year (2021, 2022); ASUN Newcomer of the Year (2021); 2× ASUN All-First Team (2021, 2022); 2× ASUN tournament MVP (2021, 2022); 2× Becky Hammon Mid-Major Player of the Year (2021, 2022); Big Ten All-Freshman Team (2020); McDonald's All-American (2019); 3× Ohio Ms. Basketball (2017, 2018, 2019)
- Stats at Basketball Reference

Kierstan Bell (born March 16, 2000) is an American professional basketball player for the Las Vegas Aces in the Women's National Basketball Association (WNBA). She played college basketball at Florida Gulf Coast and Ohio State.

== College career ==
=== Ohio State ===
Bell was rated as the 8th-best overall recruit in the nation by ESPN HoopGurlz and the 18th overall by ProspectsNation.com in 2019. Bell signed to play with Ohio State out of high school. Bell had an outstanding freshman season for the Buckeyes, being named to the Big Ten All-Freshman Team, Honorable Mention All-Big Ten Team, and three-time Big Ten Player of the Week.

Following her freshman season, Bell announced that she was entering the transfer portal and leaving Ohio State.

=== Florida Gulf Coast University ===
On May 5, 2020, Bell signed to continue her collegiate basketball career with Florida Gulf Coast.

During her sophomore campaign, Bell produced the best season in program history for the Eagles. She averaged 24.3 points, 10.6 rebounds, 1.9 steals and 2.3 blocks. She was named the ASUN Player of the Week 6 different times and named the ASUN Newcomer of the Week a record ten times. Bell was also named the ASUN Player of the Year, Newcomer of the Year, the Becky Hammon Mid-Major Player of the Year, WBCA Honorable Mention All-American, AP Honorable Mention All-American, and USBWA Honorable Mention All-American.

Prior to her junior year, ESPN named Bell the 16th-best women's college basketball player for the 2021–22 season. Bell averaged 22.8 points and 7.3 rebounds during the year, but also missed time due to a partial torn meniscus. Bell also set a new ASUN record for the number of Player of the Week Honors during the season. On January 18, 2022, Bell was awarded the 11th Player of the Week honor of career.

In January 2022, Bell announced she would be declaring early for the WNBA draft. Bell was projected to go in the first round by multiple mock drafts.

== Professional career ==
=== Las Vegas Aces ===
In the 2022 WNBA draft, Bell was taken 11th overall by the Las Vegas Aces.

=== Adelaide Lightning ===
Bell signed with the Adelaide Lightning for the 2022/2023 Australian WNBL season; however, she was cut by the team in December 2022.

=== Athletes Unlimited ===
Bell appeared in Athletes Unlimited Pro Basketball in 2023, finishing 10th on the season.

== Career statistics ==
Legend
GP	Games played	GS	Games started	MPG	Minutes per game	FG%	Field goal percentage
3P%	3-point field goal percentage	FT%	Free throw percentage	RPG	Rebounds per game	APG	Assists per game
SPG	Steals per game	BPG	Blocks per game	TO	Turnovers per game	PPG	Points per game
**Bold**	Career high	*	Led Division I	°	Led the league

†	Denotes seasons in which Bell won a WNBA championship

=== WNBA ===
==== Regular season ====
WNBA regular season statistics
Year	Team	GP	GS	MPG	FG%	3P%	FT%	RPG	APG	SPG	BPG	TO	PPG
2022^{†}	Las Vegas	21	1	5.8	.303	.136	**1.000**	.9	.3	.1	.1	**.2**	1.3
2023^{†}	Las Vegas	**36**	0	11.8	.346	.244	.600	1.6	.5	**.4**	.1	.4	3.7
2024	Las Vegas	6	0	7.2	**.375**	**.500**	.500	1.0	**.8**	.0	.0	**.2**	2.8
2025^{†}	Las Vegas	35	**16**	**12.2**	.338	.291	.800	**1.8**	.7	**.4**	.3	.5	**4.2**
2026	Las Vegas	28	0	9.6	.275	.240	.750	1.4	.6	.2	**.4**	.5	1.9
**Career**	5 years, 1 team	126	17	10.2	.329	.260	.743	1.5	.5	.3	.2	.4	3.0

==== Playoffs ====
WNBA playoff statistics
Year	Team	GP	GS	MPG	FG%	3P%	FT%	RPG	APG	SPG	BPG	TO	PPG
2022^{†}	Las Vegas	4	0	4.8	**.667**	**.600**	.000	**1.3**	**.3**	.0	.0	.5	**2.8**
2023^{†}	Las Vegas	8	0	6.3	.167	.000	**1.000**	.8	**.3**	**.4**	.3	.3	1.3
2024	Las Vegas	1	0	3.0	.500	—	—	.0	.0	.0	.0	**.0**	2.0
2025^{†}	Las Vegas	**12**	**12**	**10.1**	.462	.278	—	1.0	**.3**	.3	.2	.3	2.4
2026	Las Vegas	4	0	6.0	.500	.500	—	.5	.0	.3	**.5**	**.0**	.8
**Career**	5 years, 1 team	29	12	7.5	.389	.250	.800	.9	.2	.3	.2	.2	1.9

=== College ===
NCAA statistics
Year	Team	GP	GS	MPG	FG%	3P%	FT%	RPG	APG	SPG	BPG	TO	PPG
2019–20	Ohio State	**30**	10	20.9	.394	.318	.667	4.4	1.6	1.2	.9	**2.0**	10.9
2020–21	Florida Gulf Coast	26	**26**	**29.8**	**.527**	**.358**	**.753**	**10.6**	**2.7**	1.9	**2.3**	2.3	**24.3***
2021–22	Florida Gulf Coast	24	24	29.0	.471	.286	.702	7.3	2.5	**2.1**	1.8	2.1	22.8
**Career**		80	60	26.2	.473	.321	.717	7.3	2.2	1.7	1.6	2.1	18.8
