= List of NCAA Division I women's basketball career scoring leaders =

In basketball, points are the sum of the score accumulated through free throws or field goals. In National Collegiate Athletic Association (NCAA) Division I basketball, where a player's career is at most four seasons under normal circumstances, it is considered a notable achievement to reach the 1,000-points scored threshold. In even rarer instances, players have reached the 2,000- and 3,000-point plateaus (no player, whether male or female, has ever scored 4,000 or more points at the Division I level). The top 25 highest scorers in NCAA Division I women's basketball history are listed below. While the NCAA's current three-division format has been in place since the 1973–74 season, it did not sponsor women's sports until the 1981–82 school year; before that time, women's college sports were governed by the Association of Intercollegiate Athletics for Women (AIAW).

To be listed in the NCAA record book, a player must have been active in at least three seasons during the era in which the NCAA governed women's sports—although for those players who qualify for inclusion in the record book, AIAW statistics are included. Most notably, Lynette Woodard of Kansas, whose career total of 3,649 points made her the career scoring leader in women's major-college basketball (Note: The overall scoring leader in women's college basketball is Pearl Moore, who scored 4,061 points from 1975–1979, mostly at Francis Marion (now an NCAA Division II program) after briefly playing at a junior college. The NAIA leader is Grace Beyer, with 3,961 points at UHSP from 2019–2024; Beyer also has the most career points in competition between four-year institutions.) before Iowa's Caitlin Clark passed her on February 28, 2024, was not recognized as the NCAA career leader because her entire college career (1977–81) predated NCAA sponsorship of women's sports.

Some players among the top 25 scorers in Division I history played in the era before the three-point line was officially adopted in women's basketball on an experimental basis in 1986–87 and fully in 1987–88. All of the players with a dash through the three-point field goals column were affected by this rule. Valorie Whiteside of Appalachian State is the only three-point shot era player on this list who did not make a single three-point shot, and she only played in one season in which the use of the three-pointer was mandatory.

The three-point distance was first marked at 19 ft 9 in (6.02 m) from the center of the basket, the same distance then used in NCAA men's basketball. From that point through the 2007–08 season, the three-point lines remained at 19 ft 9 in (6.02 m). On May 3, 2007, the NCAA men's basketball rules committee passed a measure to extend the distance of the men's three-point line back to 20 ft 9 in (6.32 m); the women's line remained at the original distance until it was moved to match the men's distance effective in 2011–12. The men's distance was changed to match the FIBA standard of 6.75 m (22 ft 1 1/2 in) in a two-phase implementation that took effect in 2019–20 in Division I and 2020–21 in Divisions II and III, but the women's distance was not changed until 2021–22, when it was moved to match the men's distance.

Two players on this list have been enshrined in the Naismith Basketball Hall of Fame: Cheryl Miller; and Maya Moore. Elena Delle Donne and Chamique Holdsclaw have been announced as 2026 inductees and will formally enter the Hall that August.

Five players among the top 25 played basketball in more than four seasons. Rachel Banham of Minnesota tore her ACL 10 games into her senior season of 2014–15. She qualified for a medical hardship waiver, popularly known as a "medical redshirt", that allowed her to compete in a fifth season. (Note: While Elena Delle Donne was a varsity athlete at Delaware in five school years, she did not play basketball in her first school year, instead playing volleyball.) Dyaisha Fair of Buffalo and Syracuse, Ashley Joens of Iowa State, Katelyn Young of Murray State, and Kyla McMakin of Longwood and Saint Louis benefited from a blanket NCAA waiver that did not count the 2020–21 season, which was impacted by COVID-19, against the athletic eligibility of any basketball player. Two players among the top 25 played at more than one school: Fair, who played the first three seasons of her career at Buffalo before transferring to Syracuse for her final two seasons of eligibility, and McMakin, who played three seasons at Longwood before transferring to Saint Louis.

== Key ==
| **Pos.** | G | F | C | **Ref.** |
| Position | Guard | Forward | Center | References |

| † | Elected to the Women's Basketball Hall of Fame |
| * | Elected to the Naismith Basketball Hall of Fame |
| **Bold** | Denotes current NCAA D1 Women's Basketball Record |

== Top 25 career scoring leaders ==
| Player | Pos. | Team | Career start | Career end | Games played | Field goals made | 3-point field goals made | Free throws made | Points | PPG | Ref. (Note: Except as otherwise noted, references for each entry are cited in the "General references" section below. Specifically: Games played and total points are available from the most recent edition of the NCAA Division I women's basketball record book.; More detailed statistics are available by searching for the named player in the NCAA women's basketball statistical database. Enter the player's name (last name required, first name optional), make sure that the "Player" option is specified, and click on the appropriate entry returned.) |
|---|---|---|---|---|---|---|---|---|---|---|---|
| Caitlin Clark | G | Iowa | 2020 | 2024 | 139 | **1,293** | **548** | 817 | **3,951** | **28.42** | |
| Kelsey Plum | G | Washington | 2013 | 2017 | 139 | 1,136 | 343 | **912** | 3,527 | 25.4 | |
| Dyaisha Fair | G | Buffalo / Syracuse | 2019 | 2024 | 153 | 1,159 | 430 | 655 | 3,403 | 22.3 | |
| Kelsey Mitchell | G | Ohio State | 2014 | 2018 | 139 | 1,120 | 497 | 665 | 3,402 | 24.5 | |
| Jackie Stiles† | G | Missouri State (Note: Known as Southwest Missouri State during Stiles' career.) | 1997 | 2001 | 129 | 1,160 | 221 | 852 | 3,393 | 26.1 | |
| Brittney Griner | C | Baylor | 2009 | 2013 | 148 | 1,247 | 2 | 787 | 3,283 | 22.2 | |
| Patricia Hoskins | F | Mississippi Valley State | 1985 | 1989 | 110 | 1,196 | 24 | 708 | 3,122 | 28.38 | (Note: This player is not listed in the NCAA statistical database. However, entering the 2019–20 season, she was among the top 25 players on the official D-I women's leaderboard for career scoring average. This leaderboard, included in the printed NCAA D-I record book for 2019–20, provides a complete breakdown of each player's scoring.) |
| Lorri Bauman | F | Drake | 1980 | 1984 | 120 | 1,104 | — | 907 | 3,115 | 26.0 | |
| Jerica Coley | G | FIU | 2010 | 2014 | 131 | 1,099 | 160 | 749 | 3,107 | 23.7 | |
| Rachel Banham | G | Minnesota | 2011 | 2016 | 144 | 1,081 | 354 | 577 | 3,093 | 21.5 | |
| Ashley Joens | G/F | Iowa State | 2018 | 2023 | 158 | 988 | 344 | 740 | 3,060 | 19.3 | |
| Elena Delle Donne†* | F | Delaware | 2009 | 2013 | 114 | 1,030 | 206 | 773 | 3,039 | 26.7 | |
| Maya Moore†* | F | UConn (Note: Officially known for athletic purposes as Connecticut during her college career.) | 2007 | 2011 | 154 | 1,171 | 311 | 383 | 3,036 | 19.7 | |
| Katelyn Young | F | Murray State | 2020 | 2025 | 155 | 1,122 | 141 | 644 | 3,029 | 19.5 | |
| Chamique Holdsclaw†* | F | Tennessee | 1995 | 1999 | 146 | 1,233 | 36 | 523 | 3,025 | 20.4 | |
| Cheryl Miller†* | F | USC | 1982 | 1986 | 126 | 1,159 | — | 700 | 3,018 | 23.6 | |
| Cindy Blodgett | G | Maine | 1994 | 1998 | 118 | 1,055 | 219 | 676 | 3,005 | 25.5 | |
| LaToya Thomas | F | Mississippi State | 1999 | 2003 | 125 | 1,119 | 34 | 709 | 2,981 | 23.8 | |
| Valorie Whiteside | F | Appalachian State | 1984 | 1988 | 116 | 1,153 | 0 | 638 | 2,944 | 25.4 | |
| Kelly Mazzante | G | Penn State | 2000 | 2004 | 133 | 1,051 | 357 | 460 | 2,919 | 21.9 | |
| Joyce Walker | C | LSU | 1980 | 1984 | 117 | 1,259 | — | 388 | 2,906 | 24.8 | |
| Kyla McMakin | G | Longwood / Saint Louis | 2019 | 2024 | 164 | 1,033 | 315 | 518 | 2,899 | 17.7 | |
| Maddy Siegrist | F | Villanova | 2019 | 2023 | 119 | 1,094 | 210 | 498 | 2,896 | 24.3 | |
| Jess Kovatch | G | Saint Francis (PA) | 2015 | 2019 | 130 | 965 | 472 | 473 | 2,874 | 22.1 | |
| Kevi Luper | G | Oral Roberts | 2009 | 2013 | 126 | 1,052 | 195 | 568 | 2,867 | 22.8 | |
