= Kelsey Plum =

American basketball player (born 1994)

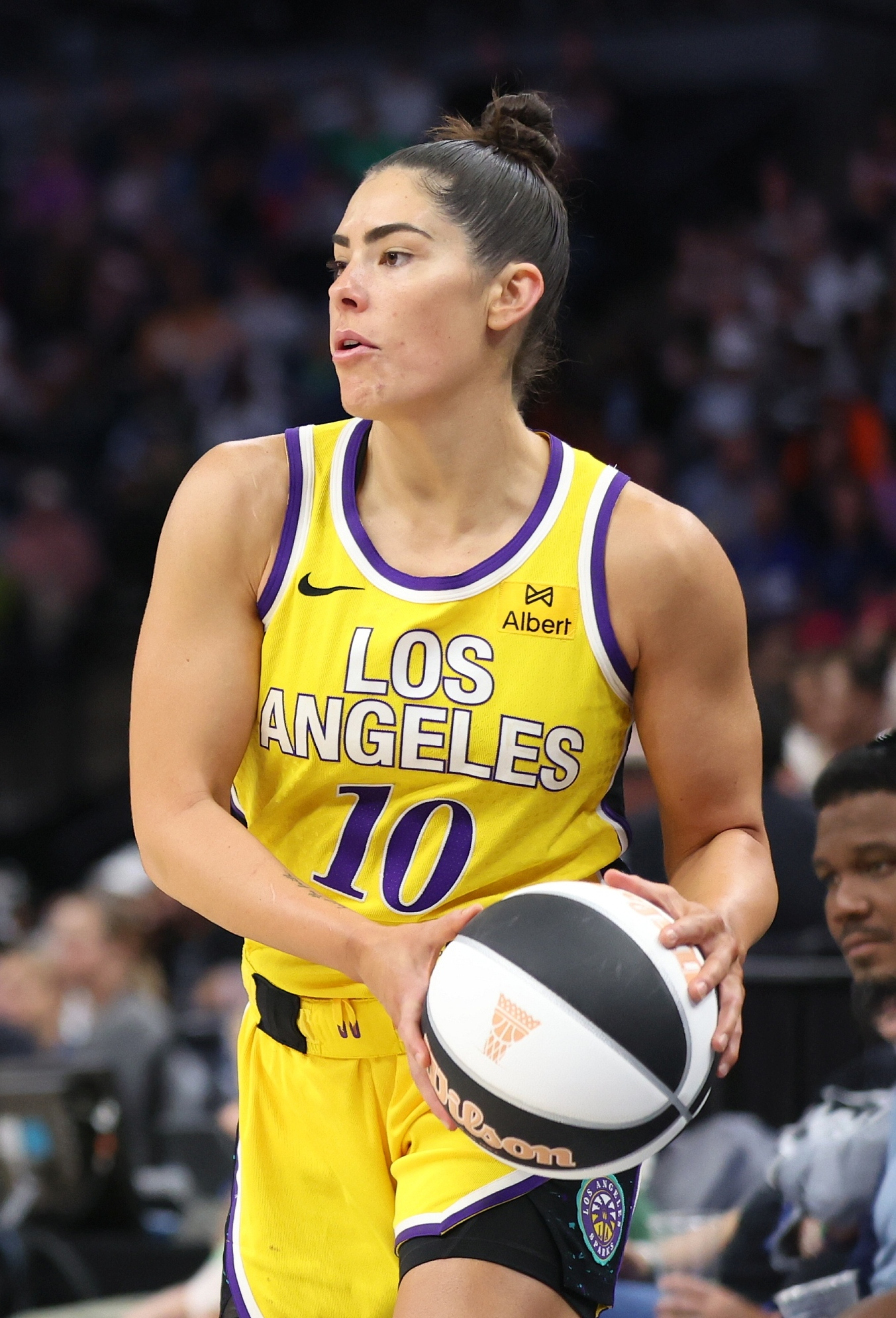
- Plum with the Los Angeles Sparks in 2025

No. 0 – Phoenix Mercury
- Position: Point guard
- League: WNBA

Personal information
- Born: August 24, 1994 (age 32) Poway, California, U.S.
- Listed height: 5 ft 8 in (1.73 m)
- Listed weight: 145 lb (66 kg)

Career information
- High school: La Jolla Country Day (La Jolla, California)
- College: Washington (2013–2017)
- WNBA draft: 2017: 1st round, 1st overall pick
- Drafted by: San Antonio Stars
- Playing career: 2017–present
- Coaching career: 2020–present

Career history

Playing
- 2017–2024: San Antonio Stars / Las Vegas Aces
- 2017–2021: Fenerbahçe
- 2022: Galatasaray
- 2025–2026: Los Angeles Sparks
- 2026–present: Phantom BC
- 2026–present: Phoenix Mercury

Coaching
- 2020–2022: Arkansas (graduate assistant)

Career highlights
- 2× WNBA champion (2022, 2023); 5× WNBA All-Star (2022–2026); WNBA Skills Challenge Champion (2023); All-WNBA First Team (2022); WNBA All-Star Game MVP (2022); Commissioner's Cup champion (2022); WNBA Sixth Player of the Year (2021); WNBA All-Rookie Team (2017); Unrivaled First-team all-Unrivaled (2026); Turkish Cup winner (2019); 2× Turkish Super League champion (2018, 2019); Turkish Cup Finals MVP (2018); Honda Sports Award (2017); John R. Wooden Award (2017); Wade Trophy (2017); Nancy Lieberman Award (2017); Naismith College Player of the Year (2017); USBWA Player of the Year (2017); Dawn Staley Award (2017); AP Player of the Year (2017); First-team All-American – AP (2017); Third-team All-American – AP (2016); 2× All-American – WBCA, USBWA (2016, 2017); Pac-12 Player of the Year (2017); 4× All Pac-12 (2014–2017); Pac-12 Freshman of the Year (2014); Pac-12 All-Freshman Team (2014); McDonald's All-American (2013); NCAA season scoring leader (2017); No. 10 retired by Washington Huskies
- Stats at WNBA.com
- Stats at Basketball Reference
Medals
Women's basketball
Representing United States
Olympic Games
Gold medal – first place	2024 Paris	Team
World Cup
Gold medal – first place	2022 Australia
Gold medal – first place	2018 Spain
Pan American Games
Silver medal – second place	2015 Toronto	Team
FIBA Under-19 World Cup
Gold medal – first place	2013 Lithuania	Team
Women's 3x3 basketball
Representing United States
Olympic Games
Gold medal – first place	2020 Tokyo	Team

Kelsey Christine Plum (born August 24, 1994) is an American professional basketball player for the Phoenix Mercury of the Women's National Basketball Association (WNBA) and for the Phantom of Unrivaled. Nicknamed "Plum Dawg", she is a five-time WNBA All-Star and was named the WNBA All-Star Game Most Valuable Player (MVP) in 2022. Plum won gold medals with the United States in 3x3 basketball in 2020 and in 5x5 basketball in 2024. She is also the founder of the Dawg Class basketball camp.

Born in Poway, California, Plum attended La Jolla Country Day School, where she was named a McDonald's All-American. She played college basketball at Washington, where she left as the NCAA Division I women's all-time leading scorer. In her senior season, Plum was named national player of the year and set the Division I single-season scoring record. She was selected first overall in the 2017 WNBA draft by the San Antonio Stars, who relocated in 2018 to became the Las Vegas Aces. With the Aces, she won back-to-back WNBA championships in 2022 and 2023 and earned her first All-WNBA First Team selection in 2022.

== Early life ==
Plum is the daughter of Katie and Jim Plum. Her mother was an accomplished volleyball player for the University of California, Davis. Her father earned All-American football honors and set the CIF San Diego Section career passing yardage mark at Helix High School in La Mesa, California, and went on to play football and baseball collegiately at San Diego State. Plum has two older sisters and a younger brother. Her sisters both followed in their mother's footsteps and played volleyball. Her oldest sister Kaitlyn played for UC Davis, while Lauren played for the University of Oregon and for USA Volleyball's Junior National Team. Her younger brother Daniel played football at UC Davis.

Plum is dyslexic and felt like an outsider during her school years, repeating the fourth grade and enduring bullying. She has also experienced anxiety and depression, even as the WNBA’s No. 1 draft pick. Plum says she shares her situation to help others going through challenges understand that they are not alone and the importance of advocating for themselves. “You just don’t want to feel alone,” Plum says. “At the end of the day, we’re human beings. We want connection.”

Plum played volleyball at first, excelling in the USA Volleyball junior system, but when it came time for high school, she chose La Jolla Country Day School over Poway High School, where her sisters had attended, choosing basketball over volleyball. La Jolla Country Day School is where Candice Wiggins played during her high school years as well.

== High school ==
During the course of her high school career, Plum scored a total of 2,247 points, averaging 19.9 points per game. She recorded 677 rebounds, assisted on 381 baskets, and had 370 steals. Over her four years, her team had a record of 103–22, which led to four section titles and the 2012 CIF Division IV state championship (32-1). Plum also played AAU basketball for San Diego Sol.

Plum was selected to the 2013 WBCA High School Coaches' All-America Team. She participated in the 2013 WBCA High School All-America Game, hitting six of her eight field goal attempts, scoring 14 points.

When it came time for college choices, Plum considered Maryland and Virginia on the east coast, and Cal, Gonzaga, Oregon and Washington on the west coast, then decided to accept the offer from Washington.

Plum was named a McDonald's All-American. This qualified her to participate in the 2013 McDonald's All-American Girls Game. She was named Ms. Basketball by CalHiSports, an honor bestowed upon the best female high school basketball player in California. Prior winners include Kaleena Mosqueda-Lewis, Courtney Paris, Candice Wiggins, and Diana Taurasi.

== College career ==
=== Freshman year ===
After Plum helped the USA basketball team to win the gold medal in Lithuania, she flew directly to Seattle rather than heading home to San Diego. A teammate at the University of Washington picked her up at the airport and they were in the gym by the end of the day. By going directly to campus, Plum was able to sign up for summer school classes and get acquainted with the university and her teammates before the fall quarter began. Her head coach Mike Neighbors noticed her desire to get started, which helped him with his decision to name her the team captain before the season started, a rare event for a freshman. During her freshman year, she set six Washington freshman records. Her total points scored (695) were the most ever by a freshman, and her single game high of 38 points is a freshman record. She earned freshman of the year honors for the Pac-12 conference. She averaged almost 21 points per game during the regular season.

One of the highlights of the year was a victory over the fourth ranked team in the country, Stanford. Plum was the high scorer with 23 points.

=== Sophomore year ===
Washington opened their regular-season with a game against Oklahoma. Washington lost the game 90–80 but Plum set a new school record with 45 points. In her sophomore year, she was named to the "Wade Watch" a list of 25 players who are viewed as having the potential to win player of the year honors. She was also named to the list of 30 players to be considered for the Wooden Award. Plum helped the Washington Huskies earn a bid to the NCAA Tournament. In a coincidence, they faced Miami, coached by Katie Meier, who had been Plum's coach while on the USA Basketball U19 team. Plum scored 17 points in the game, but Miami prevailed 86–80.

=== Junior year ===
For the week of January 11–17, Plum was named both the Ann Meyers Drysdale National Player of the Week and the Pac-12 Player of the Week. By scoring 25.9 points per game, she ranked first in the Pac-12 and fourth in the nation. Plum also led the Huskies on an improbable NCAA Tournament run, highlighted by their first Final Four appearance in program history. Unfortunately, the team's run ultimately ended in the Final Four as Plum and the Huskies lost to the Syracuse Orange, 80–59.

=== Senior year ===
During Plum's senior season, she became the all-time leading scorer for either gender in Pac-12 history, passing the former record of Stanford's Chiney Ogwumike in a December 11, 2016, win over Boise State. The following month, during a win over Arizona, Plum became the first Pac-12 player, and the 12th NCAA Division I women's player, to reach 3,000 career points. (Note: Although USC's Cheryl Miller scored 3,018 career points, she never played in the Pac-12 (or, as it was known during her career, the Pac-10). During Miller's career, USC played women's basketball in the Western Collegiate Athletic Association and the Pacific West Conference. The Pac-10 did not start sponsoring women's sports until the 1986–87 school year, the season after Miller graduated.) On February 25, 2017, in the Huskies' final regular season game, Plum scored a Pac-12 record 57 points in an 84–77 win over Utah. The record-setting output also gave Plum the NCAA Division I women's basketball career scoring record. She entered the game trailing Jackie Stiles' previous record of 3,393 points by 53 points and broke the record in the fourth quarter. Plum led her Washington Huskies to a 29–6 record during her senior season, which boasted a record of 15–3 in the Pac-12. Plum, along with her third seeded Washington Huskies, made it to the regional semifinals of the NCAA tournament where they were knocked out by two seed Mississippi State.

According to ESPN.com, Plum was unanimously selected as an Associated Press All-American First Teamer, an honor only given to five players in women's college basketball. Plum averaged 31.7 points while shooting 53 percent from the floor and 43 percent from three-point range during her senior campaign. Plum ended her senior season with a total of 1,109 points scored, an NCAA women's basketball single season record. According to Excelle Sports, Plum broke the NCAA career free throw record, tallying 912 points from the free throw line throughout her illustrious career. Plum has also been named one of the five finalists for the Wooden Award, an award handed out to the best player in women's college basketball, in the eyes of 250 sportscasters and writers. Plum was also named the AP player of the year for women's college basketball, the first ever Washington Husky to earn the award. Other accolades Plum accumulated during her senior year include being a part of the all-Pac-12 team as well as winning the Pac-12 player of the year award, only the second husky ever to win the award, according to The Seattle Times' website. Plum also earned the Nancy Lieberman award, an honor given to the top point guard in women's college basketball, as well as the Dawn Staley award, handed out to the best guard in women's college basketball. Plum ended her outstanding career with a point total of 3,527 and an assist total of 519. She finished just 270 points shy of Pete Maravich's all-time scoring record regardless of gender. Plum graduated from Washington in June 2017 with a bachelor's degree in anthropology and a 3.3 GPA.

On January 18, 2025, Plum's #10 jersey was retired during the half-time of Washington's game against Purdue.

== Professional career ==
=== WNBA ===
==== San Antonio Stars / Las Vegas Aces (2017–2024) ====
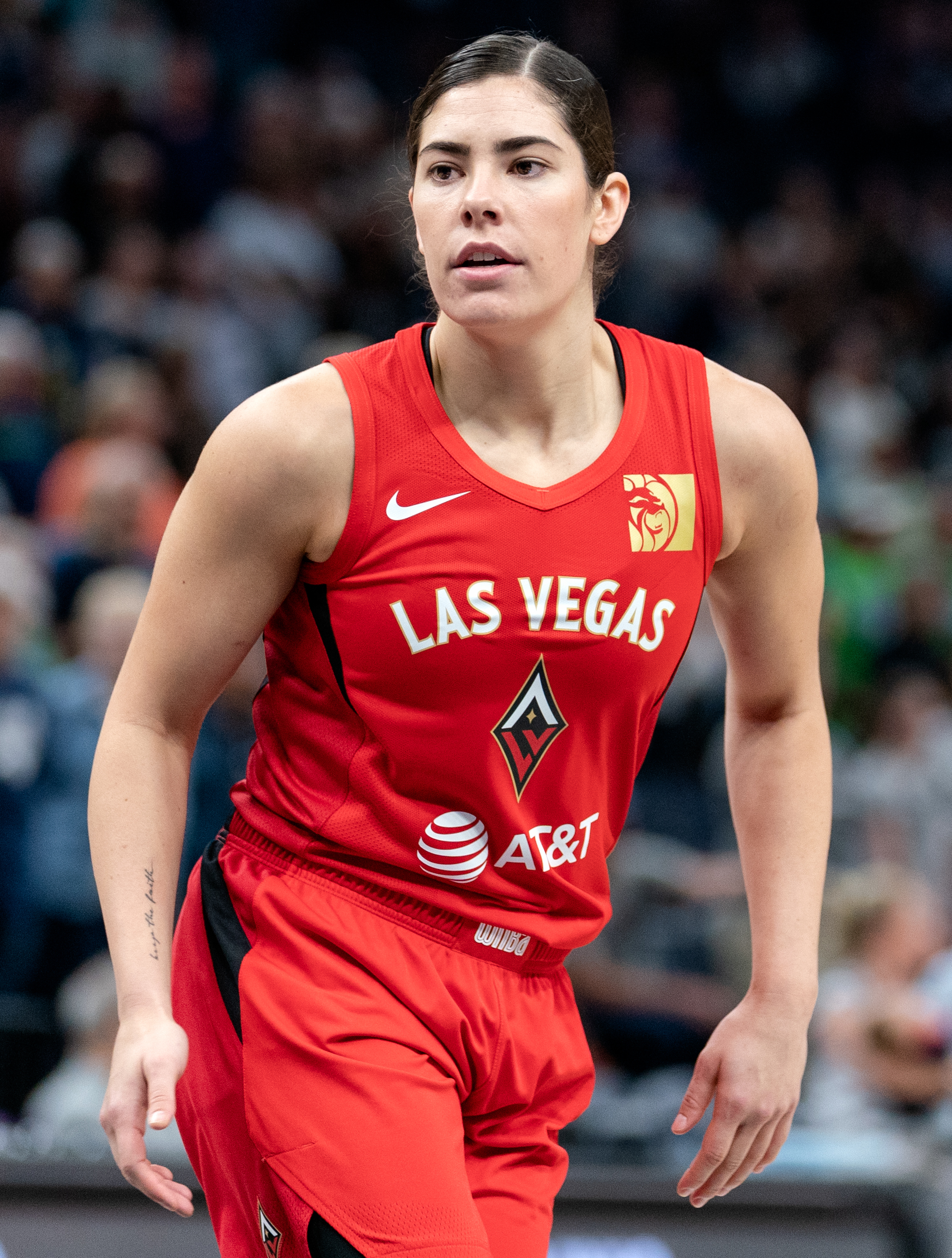
Plum with the Las Vegas Aces in 2019

Plum was selected as the first pick of the 2017 WNBA draft by the San Antonio Stars. This marked the first time in history that the first overall pick from the NBA (Markelle Fultz) and the WNBA came from the same school (University of Washington) in the same year. Plum made her career debut on May 25, 2017, against the Dallas Wings, she scored four points along with one assist off the bench in a 94–82 loss. On August 5, 2017, Plum scored a career-high 23 points in an 87–80 overtime win against the Seattle Storm. By the end of the season, Plum averaged 8.5 ppg and was voted on the All-Rookie Team, but the Stars finished with the second worst record in the league.

In 2018, the San Antonio Stars relocated to Las Vegas, Nevada, and were renamed the Las Vegas Aces. In the 2018 season, Plum improved in every statistical category, averaging more points, rebounds and assists with higher shooting percentages. This helped the Aces improve overall from the previous season but they fell short of a playoff spot as they finished ninth place with a 14–20 record (6 wins better than the 2017 season).

In 2019, the Aces would finish the season as the number four seed with a 21–13 record, making the playoffs for the first time since 2014. They would receive a bye to the second round. In the playoffs, Plum would step up on the offensive end, averaging double-digits in ppg for the entire Aces playoff run. In the second round elimination game, the Aces defeated the Chicago Sky 93-92 off a desperation half-court game winner by teammate Dearica Hamby who came up with a steal on defence in the final 10 seconds of the game. In the semi-finals, the Aces would lose in four games to the Washington Mystics, who ended up winning the championship.

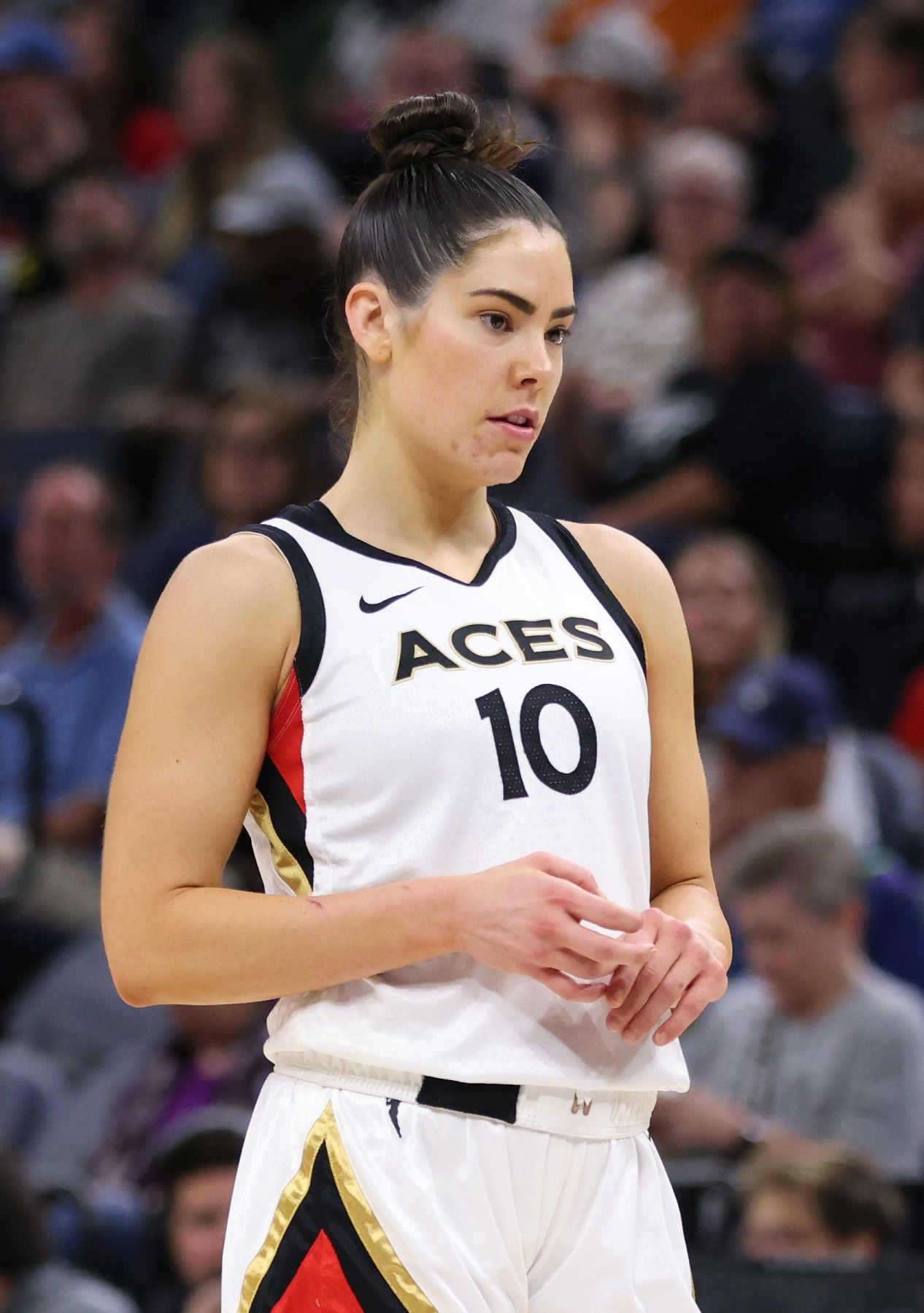
Plum with the Aces in 2023

On May 15, 2020, Plum signed a two-year extension with the Aces worth $350K. In early June, 2020, she suffered an injury to her Achilles tendon. Due to the injury and the surgery to repair it, she missed the 2020 season. Without Plum, the Aces were 18–4 in the shortened 22-game season with the number 1 seed. They would advance all the way to the Finals but fell short by losing to the Seattle Storm in a three-game sweep.

In 2021, Plum came off the bench and had a career year averaging 14.8 points, 3.6 assists, 2.5 rebounds, and 1.0 steals on 38.6% from the three and 94.4% from the free throw line. Plum ended the month of September averaging 21.7 points, 3.2 assists, and 1.5 steals, and was named Western Conference Player of the Month. Plum was finally healthy and had a career revamp season coming off the bench winning the WNBA Sixth Player of the Year and finished second in the WNBA Most Improved Player voting.

In 2022, Plum in a now starting role averaged a new career high in points, assist, and rebounds. 20.2 points, 5.1 assists, and 2.7 rebounds on 42% from three and 46% from the field. On June 22, Plum was announced to her first All-Star team as well as being voted a starter for the All-Star Game. She then signed a two-year contract extension with Las Vegas worth $185k for one year and $200k the other year. On July 10, she scored 30 points in the All-Star Game en route to being named the game's MVP. She grabbed Western Conference Player of the week two times for the weeks of May 30-June 5 and July 28-July 31. Plum would go on to help the Aces to their second finals appearance and win their first championship in franchise history.

==== Los Angeles Sparks (2025–2026) ====
On January 31, 2025, Plum was involved in a three-team trade between the Las Vegas Aces, the Los Angeles Sparks, and the Seattle Storm, which resulted in Plum being traded to the Los Angeles Sparks for the 2025 season.

On April 12, 2026, Plum re-signed with the Sparks on a one-year, $999,999 contract.

==== Phoenix Mercury (2026–present) ====
On August 1, 2026, Plum was traded to the Phoenix Mercury in exchange for Monique Akoa Makani, a 2027 first-round pick, and a 2028 second-round pick.

=== KBSL ===
==== Fenerbahçe ====
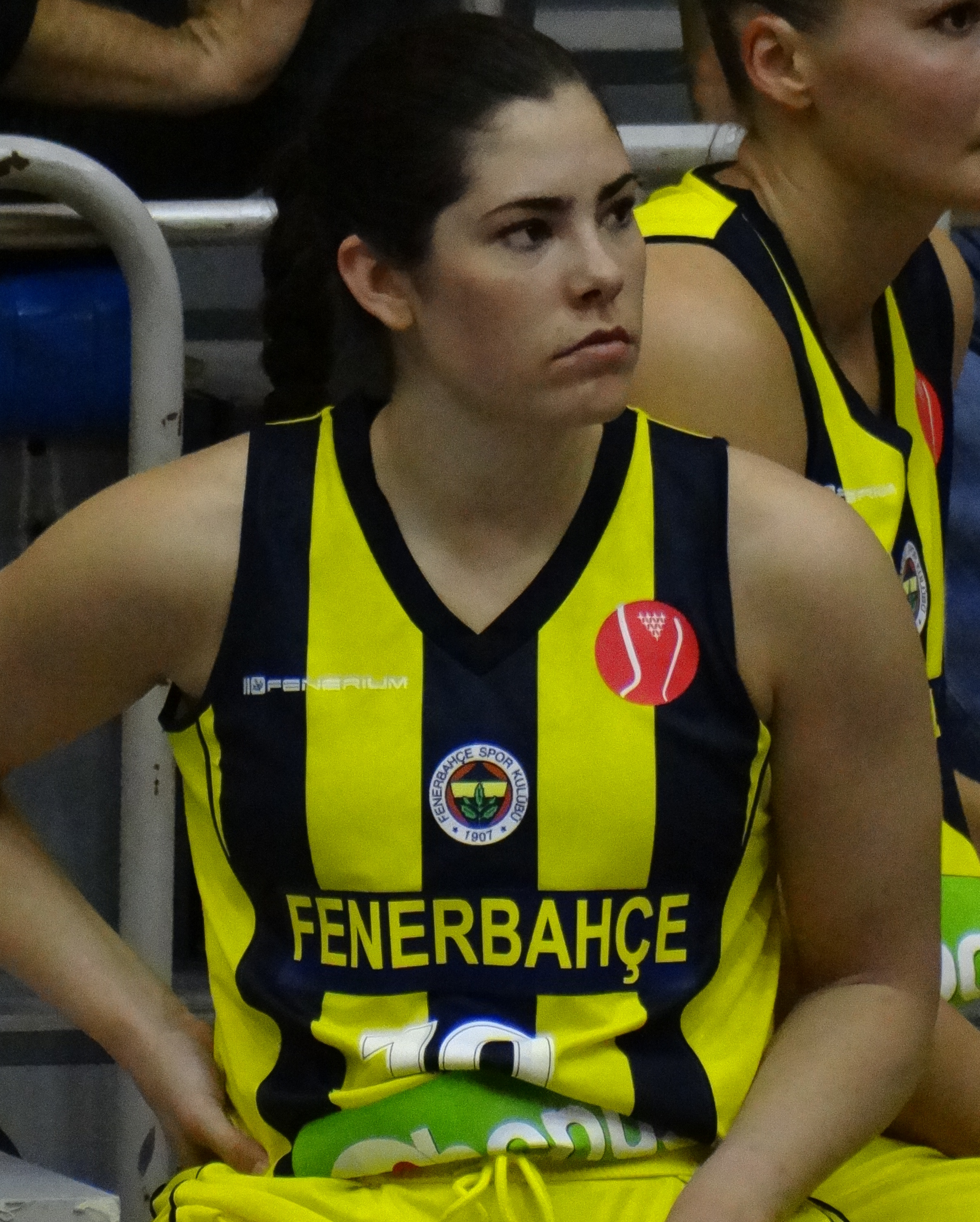
Plum with Fenerbahçe in October 2017

In 2017, Plum signed with Fenerbahçe of the Women's Basketball Super League (KBSL) in Turkey for the 2017–18 season. During her first stint with the team, Plum would help the team win the KBSL championship title. She returned with Fenerbahçe for the 2018–19 season, helping the team win another KBSL championship and the Turkish Women's Basketball Cup.

==== Galatasaray ====
On 15 January 2022, she signed with Galatasaray of the KBSL. In 6 games in the KBSL, she averaged 26.5 points, 4.3 rebounds and 4.8 assists.

=== Unrivaled ===
On July 15, 2024, it was announced that Plum would appear and play in the inaugural season of Unrivaled, a new women's 3-on-3 basketball league founded by Napheesa Collier and Breanna Stewart. In late November 2024, Plum announced via social media that she would no longer be playing in the 2025 Unrivaled season and instead would "take some more time for myself this offseason."

On November 5, 2025, it was announced that Plum had been drafted by Phantom BC for the 2026 Unrivaled season.

== National team career ==
=== U19 team 2013 ===
Plum was named to the USA Basketball U19 team, coached by Katie Meier, the head coach of the University of Miami. Among Plum's teammates were Moriah Jefferson and Breanna Stewart. Plum competed on behalf of the US at the Tenth FIBA U19 World Championship, held in Klaipėda and Panevežys, Lithuania, in July 2013. The team won all nine games, with a winning margin averaging 43 points per game. Plum scored 5.6 points per game.

=== Pan American team 2015 ===
Plum was injured in December, but cleared to continue playing through the season. After the season she underwent surgery on April 6. Her original dates for clearance to play extended beyond the Pan Am team trial date, but her rehabilitation went well, and she was cleared to return to the court two days before the Pan Am team trials. She has been named a member of the twelve player squad representing the US to play Basketball at the 2015 Pan American Games in Toronto which will be held from July 16 to 25 at the Ryerson Athletic Centre.

Plum was a member of the USA Women's Pan American Team which participated in basketball at the 2015 Pan American Games held in Toronto, Ontario, Canada July 10 to 26, 2015. The USA opened preliminary play with a game against Brazil. Although they opened up a 16-point lead in the second quarter Brazil came back, going on a 14–0 run to take a two-point lead in the third quarter. The USA responded with an 11–2 run with foul shot contributions by Jefferson and a three-point basket from Stewart. The USA ended up winning the close game 75–69.

The second game was against the Dominican Republic. USA scored the first eight points and was never threatened. USA won 94–55. Plum led the team with five assists. The final preliminary game USA played Puerto Rico. USA led by only three points at the end of the third quarter, largely due to the play of Carla Cortijo who scored 24 points, but left with an injury late in the game. After the injury the US extended the lead to 18 points and ended up with a 93–77 win, good for first place in their group.

In the semifinal game, Cuba led the US by as many as 14 points in the third quarter. The USA battled back and took a late lead. With under eight seconds to go, the USA was down by one point while Cuba had the ball. Linnae Harper stole the ball and made two free throws to give the USA the lead. Cuba missed its final shot to give the USA the win 65–64, propelling them into the gold-medal game against Canada.

The gold-medal game matched up the host team Canada against USA. After trading baskets early, the US edged out to a double-digit lead in the second quarter. However the Canadians fought back and tied up the game at halftime. In the third quarter, Canada outscored the US 26–15. The lead would reach as high as 18 points. The USA would fight back, but not all the way and Canada won the game and the gold-medal 81–73.

=== 2020 Summer Olympics ===
In late March 2020, the International Olympic Committee (IOC) and the Tokyo Metropolitan Government postponed the 2020 Summer Olympics until the summer of 2021 due to the COVID-19 pandemic. In July 2021, Plum won the gold medal in 3x3 basketball at the 2020 Summer Olympics.

=== 2024 Summer Olympics ===
In June 2024, Plum was named to the US women's Olympic team to compete at the 2024 Summer Olympics in France, alongside fellow Aces teammates, Chelsea Gray, A'ja Wilson, and Jackie Young. Plum and the United States defeated France 67–66 in the final, earning her first 5x5 gold medal and the United States' eighth consecutive gold medal.

== Career statistics ==
Legend
GP	Games played	GS	Games started	MPG	Minutes per game	FG%	Field goal percentage
3P%	3-point field goal percentage	FT%	Free throw percentage	RPG	Rebounds per game	APG	Assists per game
SPG	Steals per game	BPG	Blocks per game	TO	Turnovers per game	PPG	Points per game
**Bold**	Career high	*	Led Division I	°	Led the league	‡	WNBA record

†	Denotes seasons in which Plum won a WNBA championship

=== WNBA ===
==== Regular season ====
Stats current through end of 2025 season

WNBA regular season statistics
Year	Team	GP	GS	MPG	FG%	3P%	FT%	RPG	APG	SPG	BPG	TO	PPG
2017	San Antonio	31	23	22.9	.346	.365	.870	1.9	3.4	0.5	0.1	2.5	8.5
2018	Las Vegas	31	27	25.5	.467	**.439**	.875	2.4	4.0	0.8	**0.2**	**1.2**	9.5
2019	Las Vegas	34	30	25.5	.365	.357	.872	**2.8**	3.0	0.8	0.1	1.5	8.6
2020	Did not play (injury)												
2021	Las Vegas	26	0	25.6	.437	.386	**.944**°	2.5	3.6	1.0	0.0	1.7	14.8
2022^{†}	Las Vegas	36	36	32.8	.460	.420	.839	2.7	5.1	1.0	0.1	2.6	**20.2**
2023^{†}	Las Vegas	39	39	32.4	**.475**	.389	.912	2.4	4.5	1.1	0.0	2.4	18.7
2024	Las Vegas	38	38	34.0	.423	.368	.866	2.6	4.2	0.7	0.0	2.4	17.8
2025	Los Angeles	**43**	**43**	**35.1**°	.422	.355	.893	3.1	**5.7**	**1.2**	0.1	3.0	19.5
**Career**	8 years, 2 teams	278	235	29.8	.430	.383	.885	2.6	4.3	0.9	0.1	2.2	15.1
**Career**	All-Star	4	1	18.4	.611	.419	1.000	2.5	4.3	0.3	0.0	2.0	21.3

==== Playoffs ====
WNBA playoff statistics
Year	Team	GP	GS	MPG	FG%	3P%	FT%	RPG	APG	SPG	BPG	TO	PPG
2019	Las Vegas	5	3	35.0	**.492**	**.529**	**1.000**°	**4.8**	**7.8**	0.2	0.0	3.0	15.2
2021	Las Vegas	5	0	28.8	.471	.387	.909	2.0	3.4	1.0	0.0	2.4	**19.6**
2022^{†}	Las Vegas	**10**	**10**	33.3	.409	.286	.891	3.9	3.8	0.9	0.0	1.9	17.1
2023^{†}	Las Vegas	9	9	**36.8**	.417	.403	.875	3.2	3.8	**1.3**	0.0	3.1	18.3
2024	Las Vegas	6	6	33.0	.461	.359	.778	2.5	2.2	0.7	0.0	**1.8**	16.3
**Career**	5 years, 1 team	35	28	33.7	.439	.369	.880	3.3	4.0	0.9	0.0	2.4	17.4

=== College ===
NCAA statistics
Year	Team	GP	GS	MPG	FG%	3P%	FT%	RPG	APG	SPG	BPG	TO	PPG
2013–14	Washington	34	34	37.3	39.3	36.7	84.6	4.7	2.7	1.0	0.2	2.9	20.9
2014–15	Washington	33	33	36.8	43.2	39.9	**89.6**	3.7	3.3	1.5	0.2	2.8	22.6
2015–16	Washington	**37**	**37**	**38.2**	40.5	33.3	89.0	3.7	4.2	**1.6**	0.2	4.3	25.9
2016–17	Washington	35	35	37.2	**52.9**	**42.8**	88.7	**5.1**	**4.8**	1.5	0.2	**2.5**	**31.7***
**Career**		139	139	37.4	44.3	38.2	88.0	4.3	3.8	1.4	0.2	3.1	25.4

== Personal life ==
On March 4, 2023, Plum married American football player Darren Waller. Waller and Plum filed for divorce on April 23, 2024.

Plum is proudly of Irish descent. Despite this, she has been referred to as the "Puerto Rican Princess" and others have also claimed that she has Dominican ancestry. Nonetheless, Plum has embraced the nickname.

Plum is Christian.

Plum got a tattoo in 2018 on her right forearm, which reads "Keep the faith". Plum has said that the tattoo helped her push through a difficult time in her life. Plum also has a tattoo from her marriage which she now regrets. Plum is known for her streetwear style, topknot bun, natural look, and strong physique.

Plum serves as WNBPA first vice president and has been vocal about the WNBPA's desire to be paid a similar share of revenue as NBA players, as well as praising the association's efforts in helping flip a senate seat in Georgia.

Plum kicked off the first marquee event of the WSOP's Mystery Millions and unveiled the gold bracelet to be won in the Mystery Millions.

Plum has been involved in philanthropic efforts.

Plum has a love for cigars and has developed her own cigar brand.

=== Depression ===
Plum faced depression and suicidal thoughts during her career, and went so far as to sitting on a tall parking structure with her feet hanging over the ledge considering how her family would feel if she jumped. She is now an advocate for mental health.

== Awards and honors ==
=== High school ===
- 2012-California State Championship
- 2013-Coastal League Player of the Year
- 2013-Division IV Player of the Year
- 2013-San Diego Women’s Basketball Player of the Year
- 2013-San Diego Athete of the Year
- 2013-Max Preps All-American
- 2013-USA Today All-American
- 2013—CalHiSports Ms. Basketball
- 2013—WBCA High School Coaches' All-America Team
- 2013—McDonald's All-America team
- 2009 - 2013-San Diego Section Championship (Regional Title)

=== College ===
- 2016—WBCA NCAA Div. 1 All-America team
- 2017—NCAA all-time women's basketball leading scorer
- 2017—espnW national player of the year
- 2017—unanimous pick on the espnW All-America first team
- 2017—unanimous pick on the AP All-America first team
- 2017—USBWA All-America team
- 2017—AP women's basketball player of the year
- 2017—Dawn Staley Award
- 2017—The Ann Meyers Drysdale Award as USBWA national player of the year
- 2017—Naismith Trophy
- 2017—Nancy Lieberman Award
- 2017—WBCA NCAA Div. 1 All-America team
- 2017—Wade Trophy
- 2017—John R. Wooden Award Women's Player of the Year
- 2017—Honda Sports Award
- 2017—NCAA season scoring leader

=== WNBA ===
- WNBA All-Rookie Team (2017)
- WNBA Sixth Player of the Year (2021)
- Commissioner's Cup champion (2022)
- WNBA All-Star Game MVP (2022)
- Associated Press All-WNBA First Team (2022)
- All-WNBA First Team (2022)
- WNBA Skills Challenge Champion (2023)
- Associated Press All-WNBA Second Team (2025)
- 2× WNBA champion (2022, 2023)
- 5× WNBA All-Star (2022–2026)

=== USA Basketball ===
- 2× Olympic Gold Medalist (2020, 2024)
- 2× FIBA Women's World Cup Champion (2018, 2022)
- FIBA Under-19 Women's World Cup Champion (2013)
- FIBA 3x3 Olympic Qualifying All-Tournament Team (2021)
- FIBA World Cup Qualifying Tournament (Washington, D.C.) All-Star Five (2022)
- FIBA World Cup Qualifying Tournament (Puerto Rico) All-Star Five (2026)

=== International/ Overseas ===
- 2017-2018 season - Turkish Cup All-League Honorable Mention
- 2017-2018 season - Turkish Cup Finals MVP
- 2019 - Turkish Cup winner
- 2× Turkish Super League champion (2018, 2019)

=== Unrivaled ===
- Unrivaled First-team all-Unrivaled (2026)
