= Sonia Citron =

American basketball player (born 2003)

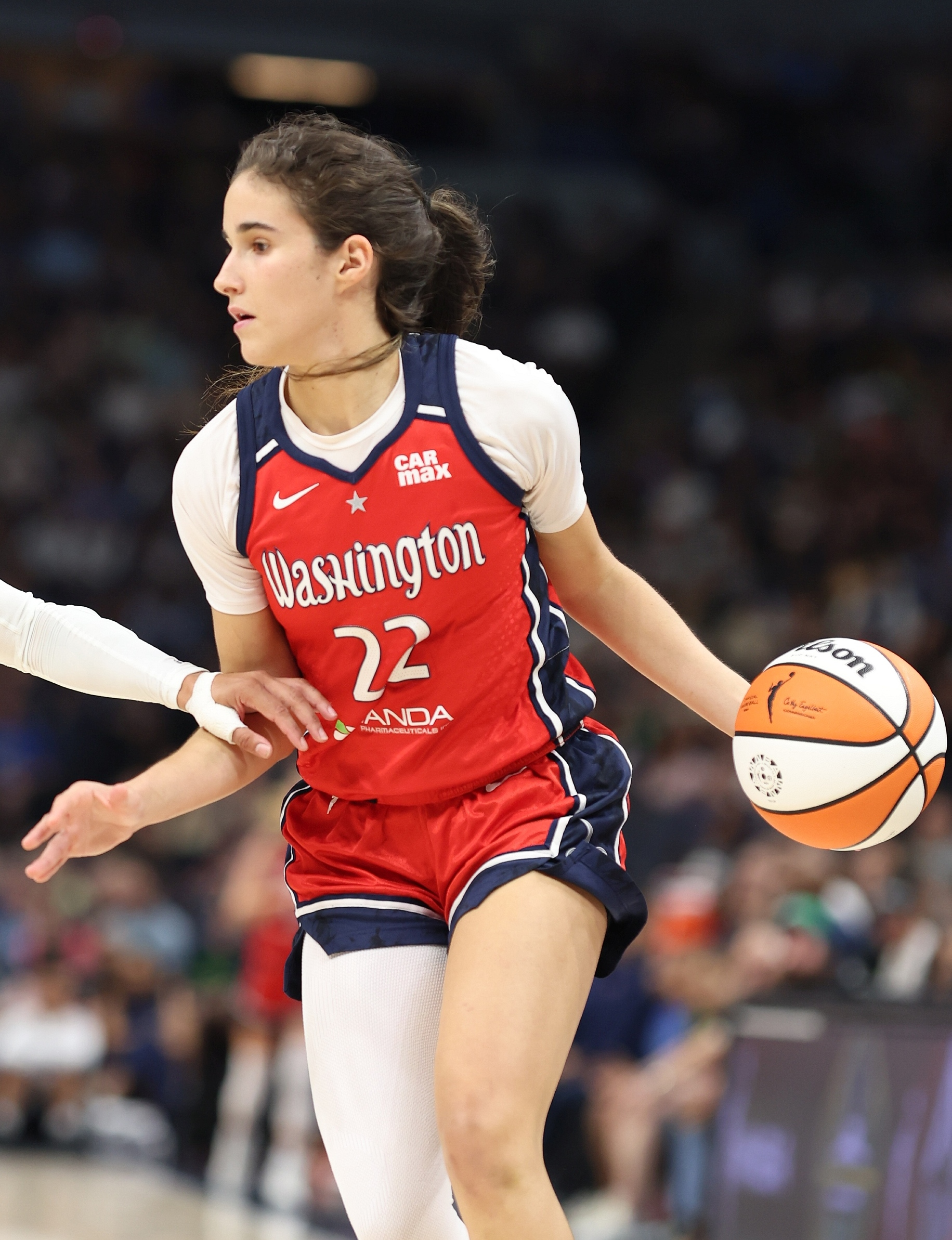
- Citron with the Washington Mystics in 2025

No. 22 – Washington Mystics
- Position: Shooting guard / small forward
- League: WNBA

Personal information
- Born: October 22, 2003 (age 23) White Plains, New York, U.S.
- Listed height: 6 ft 1 in (1.85 m)
- Listed weight: 175 lb (79 kg)

Career information
- High school: The Ursuline School (New Rochelle, New York)
- College: Notre Dame (2021–2025)
- WNBA draft: 2025: 1st round, 3rd overall pick
- Drafted by: Washington Mystics
- Playing career: 2025–present

Career history
- 2025–present: Washington Mystics
- 2026–present: Hive

Career highlights
- 2× WNBA All-Star (2025, 2026); WNBA All-Defensive Second Team (2026); WNBA All-Rookie Team (2025); 2× First-team All-ACC (2023, 2025); Second-team All-ACC (2024); ACC All-Defensive Team (2025); ACC Rookie of the Year (2022); ACC All-Freshman Team (2022); McDonald's All-American (2021); Miss New York Basketball (2021)
- Stats at WNBA.com
- Stats at Basketball Reference
Medals
Women's basketball
Representing the United States
FIBA World Cup
Gold medal – first place	2026 Germany
FIBA Under-19 World Cup
Gold medal – first place	2021 Hungary	Team
FIBA Americas Under-16 Championship
Gold medal – first place	2019 Chile	Team

Sonia Elizabeth Citron (born October 22, 2003) is an American professional basketball player for the Washington Mystics of the Women's National Basketball Association (WNBA) and for Hive of Unrivaled. She played college basketball for the Notre Dame Fighting Irish. Citron was selected third overall by the Mystics in the 2025 WNBA draft and was named an All-Star in her rookie season.

== Early life and high school career ==
Citron was born in White Plains, New York to Yolanda and William Citron. Her father played college basketball for Bradley, and her brother, Will, has played college soccer for Cornell and Virginia. She grew up playing soccer and began focusing on basketball in eighth grade, modeling her game after Sabrina Ionescu. Citron played basketball for The Ursuline School in New Rochelle, New York and the Philadelphia Belles. As a junior, she averaged 23.8 points, 10.6 rebounds, 4.3 steals and 3.1 assists per game, and was named New York Gatorade Player of the Year, New York State Sportswriters Association Class AA Player of the Year and The Journal News Westchester/Putnam Player of the Year. She led Ursuline to the Section 1 Class AA title and a 24–0 record, before the state tournament was canceled due to the COVID-19 pandemic.

In her senior season, Citron averaged 26.3 points, 11.2 rebounds, five assists and three steals per game, leading Ursuline to the Southern Westchester Group 1 championship and a 14–0 record. She was named Miss New York Basketball as the top player in the state, while repeating as New York Gatorade Player of the Year and Westchester/Putnam Player of the Year. Citron was selected to the rosters for the McDonald's All-American Game and Jordan Brand Classic. Rated a four-star recruit and one of the top guards in her class by ESPN, she committed to play college basketball for Notre Dame over offers from Oregon, Stanford and Ohio State, among others.

== College career ==
Citron played for Notre Dame for four years. As a freshman, she averaged 11.8 points and 6.6 rebounds per game, earning Atlantic Coast Conference (ACC) Rookie of the Year. She was a six-time ACC Freshman of the Week, matching the program record held by Brianna Turner. Citron averaged 14.7 points, 5.5 rebounds and 2.5 assists per game as a sophomore and was named first-team All-ACC. She scored a career-high 29 points in a 76–71 win over Michigan State as a freshman, on December 2, 2021.

== Professional career ==
=== WNBA ===
==== 2025 season ====
On April 14, 2025, Citron was selected third overall by the Washington Mystics in the 2025 WNBA draft. She made her professional debut on May 16, in a game against the Atlanta Dream, where she scored 19 points in 6-7 shooting from the field in 24 minutes. On June 22, in an overtime game against the Dallas Wings, she scored 27 points and got 11 rebounds, becoming the first Mystics rookie to get 25-plus points and 10-plus rebounds in a game.

On July 6, 2025, Citron was named a 2025 WNBA All-Star as a reserve. With teammate Kiki Iriafen also being named an All-Star reserve, the pair made history as the second rookie teammate pair, and the first pair since 1999, to be selected as All-Stars. Citron logged 11 points in her first All-Star game.

Citron was also a participant in the 2025 WNBA All-Star 3-Point Contest. Sabrina Ionescu vowed to give half of her winnings to Citron if she won the 3-Point Contest, which she ended up winning, because Citron has stated in the past that she admired Ionescu's style of play, and because Citron was the only rookie to participate in the 3-Point Contest. The other half of Ionescu's winnings went to Ionescu's foundation, the SI20 Foundation.

2026 season

On June 20, 2026, in a win against the New York Liberty, Citron recorded a 4x5 game (4 different statistical categories with at least 5) when she logged 16 points, 8 assists, 6 rebounds and 5 steals.

On June 28, 2026, Citron scored a season high 32 points, as well as 6 rebounds and 4 assists, in a four-overtime game against the Portland Fire. The Mystics won the game 124-123. It was the second time in WNBA history that a game needed 4 overtimes to declare a winner. The other four-overtime game was 25 years prior, on July 3, 2001, when the Mystics beat the Seattle Storm 72-69.

On July 8, 2026, Citron was named as a 2026 WNBA All-Star reserve for the second consecutive season, alongside fellow Mystic Iriafen. Citron and Iriafen are the first teammates since 1999 to be named to consecutive All-Star games in their first two seasons (Shannon Johnson, Taj McWilliams-Franklin, and Nykesha Sales of the Orlando Miracle were the last teammates to be named to consecutive all-star teams in 1999).

=== Unrivaled ===
On November 5, 2025, it was announced that Citron had been drafted by Hive for the 2026 Unrivaled season. She was also named team captain despite being the youngest player on the team. On February 2, 2026, Citron scored a season-high 32 points, and also had five assists and two blocks.

== National team career ==
Citron won a gold medal with the United States at the 2019 FIBA Under-16 Americas Championship in Chile. She was named to the all-tournament team after averaging 13.3 points per game, second on her team. Citron helped the United States win another gold medal at the 2021 FIBA Under-19 World Cup in Hungary. She averaged 13.7 points, 7.3 rebounds, and 2.9 assists per game, earning all-tournament team honors.

== Career statistics ==
Legend
GP	Games played	GS	Games started	MPG	Minutes per game	RPG	Rebounds per game
APG	Assists per game	SPG	Steals per game	BPG	Blocks per game	PPG	Points per game
TO	Turnovers per game	FG%	Field-goal percentage	3P%	3-point field-goal percentage	FT%	Free-throw percentage
**Bold**	Career best	°	League leader

=== WNBA ===
Stats current through end of 2025 season

WNBA regular season statistics
Year	Team	GP	GS	MPG	FG%	3P%	FT%	RPG	APG	SPG	BPG	TO	PPG
2025	Washington	44°	44°	32.3	.470	.445°	.872	4.0	2.4	1.3	0.4	2.1	14.9
**Career**	1 year, 1 team	44	44	32.3	.470	.445	.872	4.0	2.4	1.3	0.4	2.1	14.9
**Career**	All-Star	1	0	20.8	.364	.375	—	2.0	2.0	1.0	0.0	1.0	11.0

=== College ===
NCAA statistics
Year	Team	GP	GS	MPG	FG%	3P%	FT%	RPG	APG	SPG	BPG	TO	PPG
2021–22	Notre Dame	**33**	16	30.5	44.9	34.1	84.3	**6.6**	2.2	1.6	0.4	2.1	11.8
2022–23	Notre Dame	**33**	**33**	33.5	47.6	**40.0**	76.4	5.5	2.5	1.7	0.6	2.5	14.7
2023–24	Notre Dame	26	26	**35.8**	46.0	35.9	**91.2**	5.5	**2.7**	1.8	0.6	2.4	**17.3**
2024–25	Notre Dame	32	32	34.0	**48.4**	37.2	89.0	5.4	2.7	**1.9**	**0.9**	**1.8**	14.1
**Career**		124	107	33.3	46.8	37.0	84.3	5.8	2.5	1.8	0.6	2.2	14.3

== Personal life ==
Citron is dating Dallas Cowboys linebacker Marist Liufau, her fellow Notre Dame alumnus.

Citron is of Cape Verdean descent on her mother's side. Her maternal grandparents were born in Cape Verde, as was her mother Yolanda; Citron described the family's ethnicity as "a mix of Black and Portuguese." Citron's family moved to Dakar, Senegal when Yolanda was a child. Yolanda immigrated to the United States in her mid-twenties, while other relatives remained in Senegal or moved to France. Citron grew up eating Senegalese food and listening to Cape Verdean music.

Citron's favorite musical genre is Afrobeats. In a 2025 interview, she said that her favorite artists are Omah Lay, Wizkid, and Burna Boy.
