= 2025 Las Vegas Aces season =

- WNBA champions
- Head coach: Becky Hammon
- Arena: Michelob Ultra Arena

Results
- Record: 30–14 (.682)
- Place: 2nd (Western)
- Playoff finish: WNBA Champions (Defeated Phoenix Mercury 4–0 in WNBA Finals)

The 2025 Las Vegas Aces season was the franchise's 28th season in the Women's National Basketball Association and the eighth year the franchise is based in Las Vegas - after relocating from San Antonio and Utah. This will be the fourth season under head coach, Becky Hammon. The season was tipped off on Saturday, May 17, 2025, at Barclays Center versus the defending 2024 WNBA champs, New York Liberty.

In April 2025, newly signed forward, Cheyenne Parker-Tyus, announced her second pregnancy and is expected to "miss at least the first three months" of the 2025 season. On May 1, 2025, the Aces announced that center, Megan Gustafson, suffered a left lower leg injury during training camp and would be sidelined indefinitely.

In June 2025, the Las Vegas Convention and Visitors Authority (LVCVA) announced that they again would be gifting players on the Aces roster $100,000 sponsorships. In May 2024, the WNBA opened an investigation into these sponsorships given to the 2024 Aces' players. As of June 2025, no results of the league's probe into this sponsorship had been made public.

On June 1, 2025 during the Seattle Storm home game against the Aces, a complaint was filed by the Aces with an allegation of a Storm assistant coach cursing at an Aces player. On June 4, the Storm's general manager, Talisa Rhea, stated that the WNBA would not be launching an investigation but rather would be "looking into it and that's really the extent of it."

== Draft ==
Round	Pick	Player	Position	Nationality	College/Club	Outcome	Ref.
1	First round pick forfeited (due to league rules violations)						
2	13	Aaliyah Nye	G	United States	Alabama	Signed rookie contract April 17; Made opening day roster	
3	35	Harmoni Turner	G	United States	Harvard	Signed rookie contract April 17; Waived on May 7	

== Transactions ==
=== Front office and coaching ===
Date	Details	Ref.
October 10, 2024	Assistant coach, Natalie Nakase, left Aces organization	
October 26, 2024	General manager, Natalie Williams' contract was not renewed	
November 2, 2024	Assistant coach, Tyler Marsh, left Aces organization	
November 7, 2024	Hired Ty Ellis as an assistant coach	
December 13, 2024	Hired Larry Lewis as an assistant coach	
January 27, 2025	Hired John Lucas III as a player development coach	

=== Trades ===
February
February 1 (Three-team trade)	To Las Vegas Aces Jewell Loyd (from Seattle Storm); 2025 No. 13 draft pick (from Los Angeles Sparks)	To Seattle Storm 2025 No. 2 draft pick and rights to Li Yueru (from Los Angeles Sparks); 2026 first-round draft pick (from Las Vegas Aces)
February 1 (Three-team trade)	To Los Angeles Sparks Kelsey Plum (from Las Vegas Aces); 2025 No. 9 draft pick and a 2026 second-round draft pick (from Seattle Storm)	
February 7	To Las Vegas Aces Dana Evans (sign-and-trade)	To Chicago Sky 2025 No. 16 and No. 22 draft picks
June
June 30	To Las Vegas Aces NaLyssa Smith	To Dallas Wings 2027 first-round pick

=== Free agency ===
==== Core designation ====
Player	Date	Notes	Ref.
Kelsey Plum	January 11	Traded to Los Angeles Sparks on February 1 (Sign-and-trade)	

==== Re-signed ====
Player	Date	Notes	Ref.
Queen Egbo	February 7	Training camp contract	

==== Additions ====
Player	Date	Notes	Former Team	Ref.
Elizabeth Kitley	February 3	Rookie contract (2024 draft pick – No. 24)	Virginia Tech Hokies	
Cheyenne Parker-Tyus	February 6	Training camp contract	Atlanta Dream	
Tiffany Mitchell	February 8	Details unannounced	Connecticut Sun	
Elena Tsineke	February 17	Training camp contract	AZS AJP Gorzów Wielkopolski	
Crystal Bradford	February 21	Training camp contract	Shanghai Sharks	
Aaliyah Nye	April 17	Rookie contract (2025 draft pick – No. 13)	Alabama Crimson Tide	
Harmoni Turner	April 17	Rookie contract (2025 draft pick – No. 35)	Harvard Crimson	
Deja Kelly	April 18	Training camp contract	Oregon Ducks	
Jordyn Jenkins	April 21	Training camp contract	UTSA Roadrunners	
Joyner Holmes	June 11	Rest of season hardship contract	Seattle Storm	

==== Subtractions / unsigned ====
Player	Date	Reason	New Team	Ref.
Kate Martin	December 6	Expansion draft	Golden State Valkyries	
Tiffany Hayes	February 6	Free agency – unrestricted	Golden State Valkyries	
Sydney Colson	February 6	Free agency – unrestricted	Indiana Fever	
Alysha Clark	February 9	Free agency – unrestricted	Seattle Storm	
Elena Tsineke	April 24	Waived	—	
Jordyn Jenkins	April 30	Waived	—	
Queen Egbo	May 7	Waived	—	
Harmoni Turner	May 7	Waived	—	
Deja Kelly	May 12	Waived	—	
Crystal Bradford	June 11	Waived	—	
Elizabeth Kitley	June 30	Waived	—	
Tiffany Mitchell	June 30	Waived	Seattle Storm	
Joyner Holmes	July 4	Waived	—	

==== Inactive players ====
Player	Date Set Inactive	Reason	Date Activated	Ref.
Cheyenne Parker-Tyus	May 15	Pregnancy / childbirth	September 8	

== Roster ==
2025 Las Vegas Aces roster
Players
Coaches

Pos.	No.	Nat.	Name	Height	Weight	DOB	From	Yrs
F	1	(United States)	Bell, Kierstan	6' 1" (1.85m)	176 lb (80kg)	2000-03-16	Florida Gulf Coast	3
G	11	(United States)	Evans, Dana	5' 6" (1.68m)	145 lb (66kg)	1998-08-01	Louisville	4
G	12	(United States)	Gray, Chelsea	5' 11" (1.8m)	170 lb (77kg)	1992-10-08	Duke	10
C	17	(Spain)	Gustafson, Megan	6' 4" (1.93m)	195 lb (88kg)	1996-12-13	Iowa	6
G	24	(United States)	Loyd, Jewell	5' 11" (1.8m)	175 lb (79kg)	1993-10-05	Notre Dame	10
G	13	(United States)	Nye, Aaliyah	6' 0" (1.83m)		2002-08-14	Alabama	R
F	32	(United States)	Parker-Tyus, Cheyenne	6' 4" (1.93m)	193 lb (88kg)	1992-08-22	Middle Tennessee	10
F	3	(United States)	Smith, NaLyssa	6' 4" (1.93m)	185 lb (84kg)	2000-08-08	Baylor	3
C	41	(United States)	Stokes, Kiah	6' 3" (1.91m)	191 lb (87kg)	1993-03-30	Connecticut	9
C	22	(United States)	Wilson, A'ja	6' 4" (1.93m)	195 lb (88kg)	1996-08-08	South Carolina	7
G	0	(United States)	Young, Jackie	6' 0" (1.83m)	165 lb (75kg)	1997-09-16	Notre Dame	6

Head coach
(United States) Becky Hammon (Colorado State)
Assistant coaches
(United States) Tyrone Ellis (Southern Nazarene)
(United States) Larry Lewis (Morehouse)
(United States) Charlene Thomas-Swinson (Auburn)
Player development
(United States) John Lucas III (Oklahoma State)
Athletic trainer
(United States) Bryson Creer (BYU)

Legend

- (C) Team captain
- (DP) Unsigned draft pick
- (FA) Free agent
- (S) Suspended
- Injured

=== Depth chart ===
Pos.	Starter	Bench
PG	Chelsea Gray	Dana Evans
SG	Kierstan Bell	Jewell Loyd
SF	Jackie Young	Aaliyah Nye
PF	A'ja Wilson	Cheyenne Parker-Tyus
C	NaLyssa Smith	Kiah Stokes; Megan Gustafson

== Schedule ==
=== Preseason ===
2025 pre-season game log
Total: 2–0 (Home: 2–0; Road: 0–0)
May: 2–0 (Home: 2–0; Road: 0–0)

Game	Date	Team	Score	High points	High rebounds	High assists	Location Attendance	Record
1	May 2	Dallas	W 112–78	Jackie Young (28)	Crystal Bradford (8)	Jackie Young (9)	Purcell Pavilion; 7,602	1–0
2	May 6	Phoenix	W 85–84	Deja Kelly (15)	Bradford, Wilson (6)	Chelsea Gray (5)	Michelob Ultra Arena; 8,637	2–0

2025 pre-season schedule

=== Regular season ===
2025 game log
Total: 30–14 (Home: 17–5; Road: 13–9)
May: 3–2 (Home: 2–0; Road: 1–2)

Game	Date	Team	Score	High points	High rebounds	High assists	Location Attendance	Record
1	May 17	@ New York	L 78–92	A'ja Wilson (31)	A'ja Wilson (16)	Jackie Young (5)	Barclays Center; 17,344	0–1
2	May 20	@ Connecticut	W 87–62	A'ja Wilson (22)	A'ja Wilson (10)	Gray, Wilson (4)	Mohegan Sun Arena; 8,179	1–1
3	May 23	Washington	W 75–72	Jackie Young (25)	A'ja Wilson (12)	A'ja Wilson (5)	Michelob Ultra Arena; 10,509	2–1
4	May 25	@ Seattle	L 82–102	A'ja Wilson (15)	A'ja Wilson (5)	A'ja Wilson (4)	Climate Pledge Arena; 10,634	2–2
5	May 30	Los Angeles	W 96–81	A'ja Wilson (35)	A'ja Wilson (13)	A'ja Wilson (6)	Michelob Ultra Arena; 10,504	3–2

June : 5–6 (Home: 3–4; Road: 2–2)

Game	Date	Team	Score	High points	High rebounds	High assists	Location Attendance	Record
6	June 1	@ Seattle	W 75–70	A'ja Wilson (19)	A'ja Wilson (7)	Chelsea Gray (6)	Climate Pledge Arena; 10,201	4–2
7	June 7	@ Golden State	L 68–95	A'ja Wilson (17)	Loyd, Wilson (6)	Jackie Young (3)	Chase Center; 18,064	4–3
8	June 11	Los Angeles	L 89–97	Jackie Young (34)	Wilson, Young (8)	A'ja Wilson (5)	Michelob Ultra Arena; 10,417	4–4
9	June 13	Dallas	W 88–84	Jackie Young (28)	Kiah Stokes (8)	Chelsea Gray (5)	Michelob Ultra Arena; 10,428	5–4
10	June 15	Phoenix	L 70–76	Chelsea Gray (20)	Kiah Stokes (14)	Jackie Young (5)	Michelob Ultra Arena; 10,497	5–5
11	June 17	@ Minnesota	L 62–76	Jewell Loyd (12)	Loyd, Stokes (8)	Gray, Young (6)	Target Center; 8,802	5–6
12	June 20	Seattle	L 83–90	Jackie Young (22)	A'ja Wilson (14)	Chelsea Gray (7)	Michelob Ultra Arena; 10,428	5–7
13	June 22	Indiana	W 89–81	A'ja Wilson (24)	Wilson, Young (7)	Jackie Young (7)	T-Mobile Arena; 18,547	6–7
14	June 25	Connecticut	W 85–59	A'ja Wilson (22)	Wilson, Young (8)	Chelsea Gray (6)	Michelob Ultra Arena; 10,432	7–7
15	June 26	Washington	L 83–94	A'ja Wilson (22)	A'ja Wilson (5)	Chelsea Gray (8)	Michelob Ultra Arena; 10,427	7–8
16	June 29	@ Phoenix	W 84–81	A'ja Wilson (26)	A'ja Wilson (18)	A'ja Wilson (7)	PHX Arena; 13,247	8–8

July : 6–5 (Home: 2–0; Road: 4–5)

Game	Date	Team	Score	High points	High rebounds	High assists	Location Attendance	Record
17	July 3	@ Indiana	L 54–81	A'ja Wilson (29)	NaLyssa Smith (7)	Evans, Nye (3)	Gainbridge Fieldhouse; 16,509	8–9
18	July 6	@ Connecticut	W 86–68	A'ja Wilson (19)	NaLyssa Smith (10)	Chelsea Gray (8)	Mohegan Sun Arena; 8,476	9–9
19	July 8	@ New York	L 78–87	Jackie Young (19)	Gray, Young (7)	Gray, Young (3)	Barclays Center; 15,041	9–10
20	July 10	@ Washington	L 68–70	Jewell Loyd (20)	Gray, Young (7)	Gray, Young (3)	EagleBank Arena; 9,350	9–11
21	July 12	Golden State	W 104–102	A'ja Wilson (34)	A'ja Wilson (16)	Gray, Young (6)	Michelob Ultra Arena; 10,070	10–11
22	July 16	@ Dallas	W 90–86	A'ja Wilson (37)	A'ja Wilson (10)	Chelsea Gray (7)	College Park Center; 6,153	11–11
All-Star Game
23	July 22	Atlanta	W 87–72	A'ja Wilson (24)	A'ja Wilson (12)	Jackie Young (7)	Michelob Ultra Arena; 10,361	12–11
24	July 24	@ Indiana	L 70–80	A'ja Wilson (20)	NaLyssa Smith (10)	Chelsea Gray (4)	Gainbridge Fieldhouse; 16,166	12–12
25	July 25	@ Minnesota	L 78–109	A'ja Wilson (15)	A'ja Wilson (7)	Evans, Young (5)	Target Center; 8,810	12–13
26	July 27	@ Dallas	W 106–80	Jackie Young (24)	A'ja Wilson (10)	Gray, Young (8)	College Park Center; 6,251	13–13
27	July 29	@ Los Angeles	W 89–74	A'ja Wilson (34)	Jackie Young (11)	Jackie Young (11)	Crypto.com Arena; 12,449	14–13

August : 12–1 (Home: 7–1; Road: 5–0)

Game	Date	Team	Score	High points	High rebounds	High assists	Location Attendance	Record
28	August 2	Minnesota	L 58–111	Jewell Loyd (12)	A'ja Wilson (5)	Evans, Gray (4)	Michelob Ultra Arena; 10,488	14–14
29	August 3	Golden State	W 101–77	Jewell Loyd (27)	A'ja Wilson (14)	Jackie Young (8)	Michelob Ultra Arena; 10,445	15–14
30	August 6	@ Golden State	W 78–72	A'ja Wilson (27)	NaLyssa Smith (9)	Jackie Young (4)	Chase Center; 18,064	16–14
31	August 8	Seattle	W 90–86	A'ja Wilson (29)	Smith, Wilson (12)	Gray, Young (5)	Michelob Ultra Arena; 10,415	17–14
32	August 10	Connecticut	W 94–86	A'ja Wilson (32)	A'ja Wilson (20)	Gray, Young (6)	Michelob Ultra Arena; 10,407	18–14
33	August 13	New York	W 83–77	Jewell Loyd (21)	A'ja Wilson (16)	Chelsea Gray (5)	Michelob Ultra Arena; 10,417	19–14
34	August 15	@ Phoenix	W 86–83	A'ja Wilson (30)	A'ja Wilson (16)	Chelsea Gray (9)	PHX Arena; 10,850	20–14
35	August 17	Dallas	W 106–87	A'ja Wilson (34)	A'ja Wilson (8)	Chelsea Gray (14)	Michelob Ultra Arena; 10,418	21–14
36	August 19	Atlanta	W 74–72	A'ja Wilson (32)	A'ja Wilson (12)	Chelsea Gray (11)	Michelob Ultra Arena; 10,420	22–14
37	August 21	Phoenix	W 83–61	A'ja Wilson (19)	A'ja Wilson (13)	Jackie Young (5)	Michelob Ultra Arena; 10,460	23–14
38	August 23	@ Washington	W 91–81	A'ja Wilson (36)	A'ja Wilson (13)	Gray, Young (8)	CareFirst Arena; 4,200	24–14
39	August 25	@ Chicago	W 79–74	Jackie Young (22)	A'ja Wilson (9)	Gray, Young (7)	Wintrust Arena; 9,103	25–14
40	August 27	@ Atlanta	W 81–75	A'ja Wilson (34)	Jackie Young (11)	Jackie Young (10)	Gateway Center Arena; 3,326	26–14

September : 4–0 (Home: 3–0; Road: 1–0)

Game	Date	Team	Score	High points	High rebounds	High assists	Location Attendance	Record
41	September 4	Minnesota	W 97–87	A'ja Wilson (31)	A'ja Wilson (8)	Chelsea Gray (10)	T-Mobile Arena; 14,656	27–14
42	September 7	Chicago	W 80–66	A'ja Wilson (31)	A'ja Wilson (11)	Jackie Young (9)	T-Mobile Arena; 17,306	28–14
43	September 9	Chicago	W 92–61	Loyd, Young (15)	Chelsea Gray (6)	Jackie Young (7)	T-Mobile Arena; 15,640	29–14
44	September 11	@ Los Angeles	W 103–75	A'ja Wilson (23)	A'ja Wilson (19)	Jackie Young (12)	Crypto.com Arena; 13,484	30–14

2025 season schedule

Notes:

- Games highlighted in ██ represent Commissioner's Cup games.

=== Playoffs ===
2025 playoff game log
First round vs. Seattle Storm

Game	Date	Team	Score	High points	High rebounds	High assists	Location Attendance	Series
1	September 14	Seattle	W 102–77	A'ja Wilson (29)	NaLyssa Smith (9)	Jackie Young (7)	Michelob Ultra Arena; 10,407	1–0
2	September 16	@ Seattle	L 83–86	Jackie Young (25)	A'ja Wilson (13)	Chelsea Gray (9)	Climate Pledge Arena; 12,500	1–1
3	September 18	Seattle	W 74–73	A'ja Wilson (38)	Kierstan Bell (7)	Chelsea Gray (8)	Michelob Ultra Arena; 10,409	2–1

Semifinals vs. Indiana Fever

Game	Date	Team	Score	High points	High rebounds	High assists	Location Attendance	Series
1	September 21	Indiana	L 73–89	Jackie Young (19)	A'ja Wilson (13)	Chelsea Gray (4)	Michelob Ultra Arena; 10,409	0–1
2	September 23	Indiana	W 90–58	A'ja Wilson (25)	A'ja Wilson (9)	Chelsea Gray (10)	Michelob Ultra Arena; 10,516	1–1
3	September 26	@ Indiana	W 84–72	Jackie Young (25)	A'ja Wilson (8)	Chelsea Gray (6)	Gainbridge Fieldhouse; 16,507	2–1
4	September 28	@ Indiana	L 83–90	A'ja Wilson (31)	A'ja Wilson (9)	Gray, Young (9)	Gainbridge Fieldhouse; 16,022	2–2
5	September 30	Indiana	W 107–98 (OT)	A'ja Wilson (35)	A'ja Wilson (8)	Jackie Young (10)	Michelob Ultra Arena; 10,529	3–2

Finals vs. Phoenix Mercury

Game	Date	Team	Score	High points	High rebounds	High assists	Location Attendance	Series
1	October 3	Phoenix	W 89–86	Evans, Wilson (21)	A'ja Wilson (10)	Chelsea Gray (10)	Michelob Ultra Arena; 10,266	1–0
2	October 5	Phoenix	W 91–78	Jackie Young (32)	A'ja Wilson (14)	Chelsea Gray (10)	Michelob Ultra Arena; 10,404	2–0
3	October 8	@ Phoenix	W 90–88	A'ja Wilson (34)	A'ja Wilson (14)	Jackie Young (9)	Mortgage Matchup Center; 17,071	3–0
4	October 10	@ Phoenix	W 97–86	A'ja Wilson (31)	A'ja Wilson (9)	Jackie Young (8)	Mortgage Matchup Center; 17,071	4–0

2025 playoff schedule

== Standings ==
#	Team	W	L	PCT	GB	Conf.	Home	Road	Cup
1	yx – Minnesota Lynx	34	10	.773	–	20–4	20–2	14–8	5–1
2	x – Las Vegas Aces	30	14	.682	4	16–8	17–5	13–9	2–4
3	x – Atlanta Dream	30	14	.682	4	15–6	16–6	14–8	3–2
4	x – Phoenix Mercury	27	17	.614	7	13–11	15–7	12–10	4–2
5	x – New York Liberty	27	17	.614	7	15–5	17–5	10–12	4–1
6	cx – Indiana Fever	24	20	.545	10	13–8	13–9	11–11	4–1
7	x – Seattle Storm	23	21	.523	11	12–12	10–12	13–9	4–2
8	x – Golden State Valkyries	23	21	.523	11	9–15	14–8	9–13	3–3
9	e – Los Angeles Sparks	21	23	.477	13	10–14	9–13	12–10	2–4
10	e – Washington Mystics	16	28	.364	18	8–12	10–12	6–16	2–3
11	e – Connecticut Sun	11	33	.250	23	7–14	7–15	4–18	1–4
12	e – Chicago Sky	10	34	.227	24	4–17	6–16	4–18	1–4
13	e – Dallas Wings	10	34	.227	24	4–20	6–16	4–18	1–5

Notes

(#) – League Standing
c – Commissioner's Cup winners
y – Regular Season Champion
x – Clinched playoff berth
e – Eliminated from playoff contention
Source: Overall standings and Commissioner's Cup Standings

== Playoffs ==
First Round: Best-of-3
**1**	**Minnesota Lynx**	**2**
8	Golden State Valkyries	0
4	**Phoenix Mercury**	2
5	New York Liberty	1
2	**Las Vegas Aces**	**2**
7	Seattle Storm	1
3	Atlanta Dream	1
6	**Indiana Fever**	**2**

Semifinals: Best-of-5
1	Minnesota Lynx	1
4	**Phoenix Mercury**	**3**
2	**Las Vegas Aces**	**3**
6	Indiana Fever	2

Finals: Best-of-7
4	Phoenix Mercury	0
2	**Las Vegas Aces**	**4**

- **Bold** – Series winner
- Italic – Team with home-court-advantage

== Statistics ==
Legend
GP	Games played	GS	Games started	MPG	Minutes per game	RPG	Rebounds per game
APG	Assists per game	SPG	Steals per game	BPG	Blocks per game	PPG	Points per game
FG%	Field-goal percentage	3P%	3-point field-goal percentage	FT%	Free-throw percentage	TO	Turnovers per game
PF	Fouls per game		Team leader		League leader

=== Regular season ===
Player	GP	GS	MPG	FG%	3P%	FT%	RPG	APG	SPG	BPG	TO	PPG
A'ja Wilson	40	40	31.2	50.5%	42.4%	85.5%	10.2	3.1	1.6	2.3	2.2	23.4
Chelsea Gray	44	44	31.1	43.9%	36.8%	88.5%	3.9	5.4	1.4	0.6	2.8	11.2
Jackie Young	44	44	30.4	47.5%	35.9%	89.4%	4.5	5.1	1.3	0.4	2.2	16.5
Jewell Loyd	44	25	28.3	38.9%	38.2%	83.1%	3.2	1.8	1.2	0.3	1.2	11.2
NaLyssa Smith	27	26	22.7	55.6%	37.5%	60.7%	5.3	0.7	0.7	0.5	1.3	8.2
Dana Evans	44	1	17.7	38.9%	36.6%	75.5%	1.1	2.2	0.4	0.1	0.8	6.6
Aaliyah Nye	44	2	15.3	34.5%	31.4%	82.4%	1.5	0.5	0.3	0.2	0.6	3.8
Tiffany Mitchell	16	2	13.1	39.0%	30.8%	79.3%	1.8	0.4	0.4	0.2	0.9	3.7
Kiah Stokes	40	18	12.9	35.3%	13.0%	62.5%	3.6	0.4	0.4	0.4	0.4	1.1
Kierstan Bell	35	16	12.2	33.8%	29.1%	80.0%	1.8	0.7	0.4	0.3	0.5	4.2
Megan Gustafson	20	1	11.3	35.1%	33.3%	46.7%	1.8	0.3	0.2	0.3	0.3	3.0
Elizabeth Kitley	12	1	8.2	30.4%	0.0%	50.0%	1.4	0.1	0.3	0.5	0.6	1.3
Cheyenne Parker-Tyus	2	0	7.0	62.5%	50.0%	83.3%	1.0	—	—	—	0.5	8.0
Crystal Bradford	4	0	6.0	33.3%	0.0%	—	1.3	0.3	0.5	—	0.3	1.0
Joyner Holmes	6	0	4.8	25.0%	20.0%	—	1.0	—	—	—	0.3	1.2

=== Playoffs ===
Player	GP	GS	MPG	FG%	3P%	FT%	RPG	APG	SPG	BPG	TO	PPG
A'ja Wilson	12	12	36.0	47.8%	40.0%	78.4%	10.0	3.3	2.1	2.5	2.3	26.8
Chelsea Gray	12	12	35.4	42.5%	42.2%	76.0%	3.4	7.3	2.3	1.3	2.2	11.2
Jackie Young	12	12	34.8	49.4%	30.9%	94.5%	4.8	5.5	1.4	—	2.5	20.4
Jewell Loyd	12	0	29.3	41.6%	41.3%	86.7%	3.9	0.8	1.0	0.6	1.0	9.4
NaLyssa Smith	12	12	23.1	57.8%	0.0%	40.7%	5.0	0.5	0.8	1.0	1.0	7.1
Dana Evans	12	0	19.7	46.8%	53.3%	100.0%	1.0	2.9	0.6	—	1.0	8.4
Megan Gustafson	10	0	10.4	44.4%	25.0%	100.0%	1.3	0.3	0.2	0.1	0.3	2.2
Kierstan Bell	12	12	10.1	46.2%	27.8%	—	1.0	0.3	0.3	0.2	0.3	2.4
Cheyenne Parker-Tyus	6	0	6.0	40.0%	33.3%	75.0%	1.0	0.2	—	0.2	0.3	2.0
Aaliyah Nye	6	0	2.5	0.0%	0.0%	—	0.2	—	—	—	—	—
Kiah Stokes	9	0	1.3	—	—	—	0.1	—	—	—	—	—

== Awards and honors ==
Recipient	Award	Date awarded	Ref.
Becky Hammon	Coach of the Month – August	September 3	
A'ja Wilson	Western Conference Player of the Week	June 3	
A'ja Wilson	Western Conference Player of the Week	July 1	
A'ja Wilson	Western Conference Player of the Week	August 12	
A'ja Wilson	Western Conference Player of the Week	August 19	
A'ja Wilson	Western Conference Player of the Week	August 26	
A'ja Wilson	Western Conference Player of the Week	September 12	
A'ja Wilson	WNBA All-Star Starter	June 30	
A'ja Wilson	Western Conference Player of the Month – August	September 3	
A'ja Wilson	AP Player of the Year	September 12	
A'ja Wilson	AP Defensive Player of the Year	September 12	
A'ja Wilson	AP All-WNBA First Team	September 12	
A'ja Wilson	WNBA Co-Defensive Player of the Year	September 18	
A'ja Wilson	WNBA Most Valuable Player	September 21	
A'ja Wilson	WNBA All-Defensive First Team	October 8	
A'ja Wilson	All-WNBA First Team	October 10	
Jackie Young	WNBA All-Star Reserve	July 7	
Jackie Young	AP All-WNBA Second Team	September 12	
Jackie Young	All-WNBA Second Team	October 10	
