= 2025 Seattle Storm season =

- Head coach: Noelle Quinn
- Arena: Climate Pledge Arena; Seattle, Washington, U.S.

Results
- Record: 23–21 (.523)
- Place: 3rd (Western)
- Playoff finish: 7th seed Lost in First Round 1–2 to Las Vegas Aces

The 2025 season for the Seattle Storm of the Women's National Basketball Association (WNBA) was their 26th season as a franchise. It was the fourth full season under head coach Noelle Quinn.

The 2025 season consisted of 44 regular season games played against 12 other teams. The WNBA increased its number of regular season games and announced that the 2025 WNBA Finals would be a best-of-seven series. The WNBA players' union announced on October 21, 2024, that they had opted out of the collective bargaining agreement (CBA) in place with the league, which expired at the end of the 2025 season.

In November 2024, the Storm's ownership hired a law firm to investigate allegations of player mistreatment by the coaching staff. The Storm announced there were no violations found as a result of the investigation. Shortly after the results were published, it was announced that Jewell Loyd had requested a trade.

The Storm did not have any players taken during the expansion draft held for the Golden State Valkyries on December 6, 2024.

On May 3, 2025, the Storm announced that newly signed forward Katie Lou Samuelson sustained a right ACL tear during practice on May 1.

In addition to their preseason match-up against Connecticut on May 4, the Storm also had a closed scrimmage versus Los Angeles on May 10 at Pauley Pavilion.

On June 1, 2025, during the Storm's home game against the Las Vegas Aces, a complaint was filed by the Aces with an allegation of a Storm assistant coach cursing at an Aces player. On June 4, the Storm's general manager Talisa Rhea stated that the WNBA would not be launching an investigation but rather would be "looking into it and that's really the extent of it."

On June 4, 2025, it was reported that Li Yueru made a request to be traded. The following day after the Storm's practice, Li explained her request was due to her desire for playing time and stated "I just want to play...I came to America only for one reason—just that I want to play basketball." She was traded to the Dallas Wings on June 14 in exchange for draft picks.

== Draft ==
| Round | Pick | Player | Position | Nationality | College/Club | Outcome | Ref. |
|---|---|---|---|---|---|---|---|
| 1 | 2 | Dominique Malonga | F/C | France | ASVEL Féminin (France) | Signed rookie contract on April 18; Made opening day roster | |
| 3 | 26 | Serena Sundell | G | United States | Kansas State | Signed rookie contract on April 18; Waived on May 12 | |
| 3 | 29 | Madison Conner | G | United States | TCU | Signed rookie contract April 18; Waived on May 6 | |
| 3 | 34 | Jordan Hobbs | G | United States | Michigan | Signed rookie contract April 18; Waived on May 6 | |

== Transactions ==
=== Front office and coaching ===
| Date | Details | Ref. |
|---|---|---|
| March 5 | Hired Mitch Thompson as assistant coach | |
| March 5 | Hired Elijah Knox as player development coach | |
| March 5 | Promoted Drew Stanich to assistant general manager | |
| July 23 | Bobby Wagner joined team ownership group | |

=== Trades ===
February
| February 1 (Three-team trade) | To Seattle Storm 2025 No. 2 draft pick and rights to Li Yueru (from Los Angeles Sparks); 2026 first round draft pick (from Las Vegas Aces) | To Las Vegas Aces Jewell Loyd (from Seattle Storm); 2025 No. 13 draft pick (from Los Angeles Sparks) |
| February 1 (Three-team trade) | To Los Angeles Sparks Kelsey Plum (from Las Vegas Aces); 2025 No. 9 draft pick and a 2026 second round draft pick (from Seattle Storm) | |
| February 14 | To Seattle Storm Lexie Brown; 2025 No. 26 draft pick | To Los Angeles Sparks 2025 No. 21 draft pick 2027 second round draft pick |
June
| June 14 | To Seattle Storm 2026 second round draft pick (with right to swap with the Connecticut Sun); 2027 third round pick (with right to swap with the Indiana Fever) | To Dallas Wings Li Yueru |
August
| August 5 | To Seattle Storm Brittney Sykes | To Washington Mystics Alysha Clark; Zia Cooke; 2026 first round pick (Seattle’s own) |

=== Free agency ===
==== Core designation ====
| Player | Date | Notes | Ref. |
|---|---|---|---|
| Gabby Williams | January 14 | Reported 1-year deal | |

==== Re-signed / extensions ====
| Player | Date | Notes | Ref. |
|---|---|---|---|
| Nneka Ogwumike | February 8 | Reported 1-year deal | |
| Jordan Horston | May 13 | Exercised team option (Fourth-year) | |

==== Additions ====
| Player | Date | Notes | Former Team | Ref. |
|---|---|---|---|---|
| Li Yueru | February 1 | Training camp contract | Los Angeles Sparks | |
| Alysha Clark | February 9 | One-year deal | Las Vegas Aces | |
| Erica Wheeler | February 12 | Training camp contract | Indiana Fever | |
| Mackenzie Holmes | February 13 | Rookie contract (2024 draft pick – No. 26) | Indiana Hoosiers | |
| Mackenzie Holmes | June 16 | Rest of season contract | Free agent | |
| Zia Cooke | February 13 | Training camp contract | Los Angeles Sparks | |
| Brianna Fraser | February 13 | Training camp contract | Galatasaray S.K. | |
| Katie Lou Samuelson | February 21 | Details not announced | Indiana Fever | |
| Madison Conner | April 18 | Rookie contract (2025 draft pick – No. 29) | TCU Horned Frogs | |
| Jordan Hobbs | April 18 | Rookie contract (2025 draft pick – No. 34) | Michigan Wolverines | |
| Dominique Malonga | April 18 | Rookie contract (2025 draft pick – No. 2) | ASVEL Féminin | |
| Serena Sundell | April 18 | Rookie contract (2025 draft pick – No. 26) | Kansas State Wildcats | |
| Tiffany Mitchell | July 10 | Rest of season contract | Free agent | |
| Zia Cooke | August 18 | Rest of season contract | Free agent | |

=== Subtractions / unsigned ===
| Player | Date | Reason | New Team | Ref. |
|---|---|---|---|---|
| Joyner Holmes | February 2 | Free agency – unrestricted | Las Vegas Aces | |
| Sami Whitcomb | February 2 | Free agency – unrestricted | Phoenix Mercury | |
| Mercedes Russell | February 11 | Free agency – unrestricted | Los Angeles Sparks | |
| Victoria Vivians | April 16 | Free agency – unrestricted | Adelitas de Chihuahua | |
| Jordan Horston | April 17 | Suspended contract – full season | N/A – retained rights | |
| Nika Mühl | April 17 | Suspended contract – full season | N/A – retained rights | |
| Madison Conner | May 6 | Waived | — | |
| Jordan Hobbs | May 6 | Waived | — | |
| Serena Sundell | May 12 | Waived | Dallas Wings | |
| Brianna Fraser | May 12 | Waived | — | |
| Mackenzie Holmes | May 12 | Waived | — | |

== Roster ==
2025 Seattle Storm roster
Players
Coaches

| Pos. | No. | Nat. | Name | Height | Weight | DOB | From | Yrs |
|---|---|---|---|---|---|---|---|---|
| G | 8 | (United States) | Brown, Lexie | 5' 9" (1.75m) | 162 lb (73kg) | 1994-10-27 | Duke | 7 |
| G | 7 | (United States) | Cooke, Zia | 5' 9" (1.75m) | 163 lb (74kg) | 2001-01-09 | South Carolina | 2 |
| G | 4 | (United States) | Diggins, Skylar | 5' 9" (1.75m) | 140 lb (64kg) | 1990-08-02 | Notre Dame | 10 |
| F | 54 | (United States) | Holmes, Mackenzie | 6' 3" (1.91m) | | 2000-11-01 | Indiana | R |
| C | 13 | (Australia) | Magbegor, Ezi | 6' 4" (1.93m) | 181 lb (82kg) | 1999-08-13 | Australia | 5 |
| F/C | 14 | (France) | Malonga, Dominique | 6' 6" (1.98m) | | 2005-11-16 | France | R |
| G | 25 | (United States) | Mitchell, Tiffany | 5' 9" (1.75m) | | 1994-09-23 | South Carolina | 9 |
| F | 3 | (United States) | Ogwumike, Nneka | 6' 2" (1.88m) | 190 lb (86kg) | 1990-07-02 | Stanford | 13 |
| F | 33 | (United States) | Samuelson, Katie Lou (injured) | 6' 3" (1.91m) | 163 lb (74kg) | 1997-06-13 | Connecticut | 5 |
| G | 20 | (United States) | Sykes, Brittney | 5' 9" (1.75m) | 154 lb (70kg) | 1994-02-07 | Syracuse | 8 |
| G | 17 | (United States) | Wheeler, Erica | 5' 7" (1.7m) | 143 lb (65kg) | 1991-05-02 | Rutgers | 9 |
| F | 5 | (France) | Williams, Gabby | 5' 11" (1.8m) | 172 lb (78kg) | 1996-09-09 | Connecticut | 6 |
| G/F | — | (United States) | Horston, Jordan (injured) (S) | 6' 2" (1.88m) | 165 lb (75kg) | 2001-05-21 | Tennessee | 2 |
| G | — | (Croatia) | Mühl, Nika (injured) (S) | 6' 0" (1.83m) | 156 lb (71kg) | 2001-04-09 | Connecticut | 1 |

Head coach
(United States) Noelle Quinn (UCLA)
Assistant coaches
(United States) Pokey Chatman (LSU)
(United States) Ebony Hoffman (USC)
(United States) Mitch Thompson (Oregon State)
Player development
(United States) Elijah Knox (Simpson)
Athletic trainer
(United States) Brittanie Vaughn (Texas Tech)

Legend

- (C) Team captain
- (DP) Unsigned draft pick
- (FA) Free agent
- (S) Suspended
- Injured

=== Depth ===
| Pos. | Starter | Bench |
|---|---|---|
| PG | Skylar Diggins | Lexie Brown |
| SG | Erica Wheeler | Tiffany Mitchell; Brittney Sykes |
| SF | Gabby Williams | Katie Lou Samuelson |
| PF | Nneka Ogwumike | Mackenzie Holmes |
| C | Ezi Magbegor | Dominique Malonga |

== Schedule ==
=== Preseason ===
2025 pre-season game log
Total: 1–0 (Home: 1–0; Road: 0–0)
May: 1–0 (Home: 1–0; Road: 0–0)

| Game | Date | Team | Score | High points | High rebounds | High assists | Location Attendance | Record |
|---|---|---|---|---|---|---|---|---|
| 1 | May 4 | Connecticut | W 79–59 | Nneka Ogwumike (18) | Li Yueru (10) | Lexie Brown (5) | Climate Pledge Arena; 7,153 | 1–0 |

2025 pre-season schedule

=== Regular season ===
2025 game log
Total: 23–21 (Home: 10–12; Road: 13–9)
May: 3–3 (Home: 2–1; Road: 1–2)

| Game | Date | Team | Score | High points | High rebounds | High assists | Location Attendance | Record |
|---|---|---|---|---|---|---|---|---|
| 1 | May 17 | @ Phoenix | L 59–81 | Skylar Diggins (21) | Ezi Magbegor (8) | Diggins, Li, Williams (4) | PHX Arena; 10,623 | 0–1 |
| 2 | May 19 | @ Dallas | W 79–71 | Nneka Ogwumike (23) | Nneka Ogwumike (18) | Skylar Diggins (9) | College Park Center; 6,137 | 1–1 |
| 3 | May 23 | Phoenix | W 77–70 | Diggins, Ogwumike (24) | Nneka Ogwumike (8) | Skylar Diggins (14) | Climate Pledge Arena; 9,091 | 2–1 |
| 4 | May 25 | Las Vegas | W 102–82 | Nneka Ogwumike (23) | Nneka Ogwumike (8) | Skylar Diggins (8) | Climate Pledge Arena; 10,634 | 3–1 |
| 5 | May 27 | @ Minnesota | L 77–82 | Gabby Williams (20) | Ezi Magbegor (10) | Gabby Williams (6) | Target Center; 7,808 | 3–2 |
| 6 | May 30 | Atlanta | L 87–94 | Skylar Diggins (20) | Ezi Magbegor (8) | Erica Wheeler (5) | Climate Pledge Arena; 9,666 | 3–3 |

June : 7–4 (Home: 4–2; Road: 3–2)

| Game | Date | Team | Score | High points | High rebounds | High assists | Location Attendance | Record |
|---|---|---|---|---|---|---|---|---|
| 7 | June 1 | Las Vegas | L 70–75 | Gabby Williams (20) | Ezi Magbegor (9) | Skylar Diggins (5) | Climate Pledge Arena; 10,201 | 3–4 |
| 8 | June 3 | Dallas | W 83–77 | Gabby Williams (18) | Nneka Ogwumike (9) | Erica Wheeler (7) | Climate Pledge Arena; 10,252 | 4–4 |
| 9 | June 7 | @ Phoenix | W 89–77 | Skylar Diggins (26) | Ezi Magbegor (8) | Diggins, Williams (7) | PHX Arena; 9,876 | 5–4 |
| 10 | June 11 | Minnesota | W 94–84 | Nneka Ogwumike (21) | Nneka Ogwumike (10) | Erica Wheeler (9) | Climate Pledge Arena; 9,722 | 6–4 |
| 11 | June 14 | @ Golden State | L 70–76 | Skylar Diggins (21) | Ezi Magbegor (6) | Erica Wheeler (5) | Chase Center; 18,064 | 6–5 |
| 12 | June 17 | @ Los Angeles | W 98–67 | Nneka Ogwumike (26) | Nneka Ogwumike (5) | Diggins, Williams (7) | Crypto.com Arena; 10,581 | 7–5 |
| 13 | June 20 | @ Las Vegas | W 90–83 | Nneka Ogwumike (25) | Ogwumike, Williams (12) | Skylar Diggins (6) | Michelob Ultra Arena; 10,428 | 8–5 |
| 14 | June 22 | New York | W 89–79 | Nneka Ogwumike (26) | Ezi Magbegor (8) | Gabby Williams (10) | Climate Pledge Arena; 12,500 | 9–5 |
| 15 | June 24 | Indiana | L 86–94 | Skylar Diggins (22) | Nneka Ogwumike (6) | Skylar Diggins (6) | Climate Pledge Arena; 18,343 | 9–6 |
| 16 | June 27 | Connecticut | W 97–81 | Skylar Diggins (24) | Gabby Williams (8) | Gabby Williams (7) | Climate Pledge Arena; 10,776 | 10–6 |
| 17 | June 29 | @ Golden State | L 57–84 | Skylar Diggins (18) | Nneka Ogwumike (7) | Skylar Diggins (6) | Chase Center; 18,064 | 10–7 |

July : 6–4 (Home: 2–2; Road: 4–2)

| Game | Date | Team | Score | High points | High rebounds | High assists | Location Attendance | Record |
|---|---|---|---|---|---|---|---|---|
| 18 | July 3 | @ Atlanta | W 80–79 | Nneka Ogwumike (24) | Nneka Ogwumike (7) | Gabby Williams (6) | Gateway Center Arena; 3,265 | 11–7 |
| 19 | July 6 | @ New York | W 79–70 | Gabby Williams (16) | Dominique Malonga (8) | Skylar Diggins (6) | Barclays Center; 15,515 | 12–7 |
| 20 | July 9 | @ Connecticut | L 83–93 | Skylar Diggins (23) | Nneka Ogwumike (12) | Diggins, Wheeler (7) | Mohegan Sun Arena; 7,984 | 12–8 |
| 21 | July 11 | Connecticut | W 79–65 | Gabby Williams (18) | Dominique Malonga (8) | Diggins, Ogwumike, Wheeler, Williams (5) | Climate Pledge Arena; 9,569 | 13–8 |
| 22 | July 13 | Washington | L 69–74 | Ezi Magbegor (19) | Ezi Magbegor (7) | Diggins, Williams (4) | Climate Pledge Arena; 11,126 | 13–9 |
| 23 | July 16 | Golden State | W 67–58 | Nneka Ogwumike (22) | Magbegor, Ogwumike (8) | Skylar Diggins (6) | Climate Pledge Arena; 12,500 | 14–9 |
All-Star Game
| 24 | July 22 | Dallas | L 63–87 | Nneka Ogwumike (22) | Ezi Magbegor (9) | Gabby Williams (8) | Climate Pledge Arena; 12,500 | 14–10 |
| 25 | July 24 | @ Chicago | W 95–57 | Skylar Diggins (21) | Dominique Malonga (10) | Gabby Williams (7) | Wintrust Arena; 7,750 | 15–10 |
| 26 | July 26 | @ Washington | L 58–69 | Nneka Ogwumike (18) | Dominique Malonga (9) | Erica Wheeler (6) | CareFirst Arena; 4,200 | 15–11 |
| 27 | July 28 | @ Connecticut | W 101–85 | Nneka Ogwumike (26) | Skylar Diggins (12) | Skylar Diggins (11) | Mohegan Sun Arena; 7,136 | 16–11 |

August : 6–8 (Home: 1–5; Road: 5–3)

| Game | Date | Team | Score | High points | High rebounds | High assists | Location Attendance | Record |
|---|---|---|---|---|---|---|---|---|
| 28 | August 1 | Los Angeles | L 106–108 (2OT) | Nneka Ogwumike (37) | Nneka Ogwumike (12) | Gabby Williams (8) | Climate Pledge Arena; 11,354 | 16–12 |
| 29 | August 3 | Indiana | L 74–78 | Nneka Ogwumike (16) | Gabby Williams (9) | Gabby Williams (5) | Climate Pledge Arena; 16,819 | 16–13 |
| 30 | August 5 | Minnesota | L 87–91 | Nneka Ogwumike (23) | Ezi Magbegor (8) | Skylar Diggins (7) | Climate Pledge Arena; 10,468 | 16–14 |
| 31 | August 8 | @ Las Vegas | L 86–90 | Dominque Malonga (22) | Dominique Malonga (12) | Diggins, Sykes (6) | Michelob Ultra Arena; 10,415 | 16–15 |
| 32 | August 10 | @ Los Angeles | L 91–94 | Brittney Sykes (27) | Dominique Malonga (11) | Skylar Diggins (6) | Crypto.com Arena; 11,796 | 16–16 |
| 33 | August 13 | Atlanta | L 75–85 | Nneka Ogwumike (29) | Nneka Ogwumike (9) | Gabby Williams (6) | Climate Pledge Arena; 10,687 | 16–17 |
| 34 | August 15 | @ Atlanta | W 80–78 | Skylar Diggins (21) | Malonga, Ogwumike (8) | Skylar Diggins (11) | Rogers Arena; 15,892 | 17–17 |
| 35 | August 17 | Phoenix | L 82–85 | Nneka Ogwumike (24) | Nneka Ogwumike (8) | Gabby Williams (7) | Climate Pledge Arena; 14,169 | 17–18 |
| 36 | August 19 | @ Chicago | W 94–88 | Skylar Diggins (24) | Ezi Magbegor (8) | Skylar Diggins (6) | Wintrust Arena; 6,724 | 18–18 |
| 37 | August 22 | @ Dallas | W 95–60 | Dominique Malonga (22) | Dominique Malonga (9) | Diggins, Sykes (5) | College Park Center; 6,063 | 19–18 |
| 38 | August 24 | @ Washington | W 84–82 | Nneka Ogwumike (30) | Dominique Malonga (10) | Skylar Diggins (11) | CareFirst Arena; 4,200 | 20–18 |
| 39 | August 26 | @ Indiana | L 75–95 | Nneka Ogwumike (17) | Dominique Malonga (6) | Skylar Diggins (8) | Gainbridge Fieldhouse; 16,737 | 20–19 |
| 40 | August 28 | @ Minnesota | W 93–79 | Skylar Diggins (23) | Nneka Ogwumike (9) | Diggins, Sykes (5) | Target Center; 9,810 | 21–19 |
| 41 | August 30 | Chicago | W 79–69 | Nneka Ogwumike (20) | Gabby Williams (8) | Skylar Diggins (6) | Climate Pledge Arena; 12,500 | 22–19 |

September : 1–2 (Home: 1–2; Road: 0–0)

| Game | Date | Team | Score | High points | High rebounds | High assists | Location Attendance | Record |
|---|---|---|---|---|---|---|---|---|
| 42 | September 1 | Los Angeles | L 85–91 | Diggins, Ogwumike (21) | Ezi Magbegor (5) | Diggins, Magbegor (6) | Climate Pledge Arena; 12,500 | 22–20 |
| 43 | September 5 | New York | L 76–84 | Nneka Ogwumike (20) | Nneka Ogwumike (9) | Skylar Diggins (7) | Climate Pledge Arena; 12,500 | 22–21 |
| 44 | September 9 | Golden State | W 74–73 | Erica Wheeler (17) | Ezi Magbegor (9) | Diggins, Williams (6) | Climate Pledge Arena; 12,500 | 23–21 |

2025 season schedule

Notes:

- Games highlighted in ██ represent Commissioner's Cup games.
- Game highlighted in ██ represents the 2025 WNBA Canada game.

=== Playoffs ===
2025 playoff game log
First round vs. Las Vegas Aces

| Game | Date | Team | Score | High points | High rebounds | High assists | Location Attendance | Series |
|---|---|---|---|---|---|---|---|---|
| 1 | September 14 | @ Las Vegas | L 77–102 | Gabby Williams (16) | Dominique Malonga (11) | Nneka Ogwumike (3) | Michelob Ultra Arena; 10,407 | 0–1 |
| 2 | September 16 | Las Vegas | W 86–83 | Skylar Diggins (26) | Malonga, Ogwumike (10) | Skylar Diggins (7) | Climate Pledge Arena; 12,500 | 1–1 |
| 3 | September 18 | @ Las Vegas | L 73–74 | Ogwumike, Wheeler (16) | Nneka Ogwumike (9) | Skylar Diggins (6) | Michelob Ultra Arena; 10,409 | 1–2 |

2025 playoff schedule

== Standings ==
| # | Team | W | L | PCT | GB | Conf. | Home | Road | Cup |
|---|---|---|---|---|---|---|---|---|---|
| 1 | yx – Minnesota Lynx | 34 | 10 | .773 | – | 20–4 | 20–2 | 14–8 | 5–1 |
| 2 | x – Las Vegas Aces | 30 | 14 | .682 | 4 | 16–8 | 17–5 | 13–9 | 2–4 |
| 3 | x – Atlanta Dream | 30 | 14 | .682 | 4 | 15–6 | 16–6 | 14–8 | 3–2 |
| 4 | x – Phoenix Mercury | 27 | 17 | .614 | 7 | 13–11 | 15–7 | 12–10 | 4–2 |
| 5 | x – New York Liberty | 27 | 17 | .614 | 7 | 15–5 | 17–5 | 10–12 | 4–1 |
| 6 | cx – Indiana Fever | 24 | 20 | .545 | 10 | 13–8 | 13–9 | 11–11 | 4–1 |
| 7 | x – Seattle Storm | 23 | 21 | .523 | 11 | 12–12 | 10–12 | 13–9 | 4–2 |
| 8 | x – Golden State Valkyries | 23 | 21 | .523 | 11 | 9–15 | 14–8 | 9–13 | 3–3 |
| 9 | e – Los Angeles Sparks | 21 | 23 | .477 | 13 | 10–14 | 9–13 | 12–10 | 2–4 |
| 10 | e – Washington Mystics | 16 | 28 | .364 | 18 | 8–12 | 10–12 | 6–16 | 2–3 |
| 11 | e – Connecticut Sun | 11 | 33 | .250 | 23 | 7–14 | 7–15 | 4–18 | 1–4 |
| 12 | e – Chicago Sky | 10 | 34 | .227 | 24 | 4–17 | 6–16 | 4–18 | 1–4 |
| 13 | e – Dallas Wings | 10 | 34 | .227 | 24 | 4–20 | 6–16 | 4–18 | 1–5 |

Notes

(#) – League Standing
c – Commissioner's Cup winners
y – Regular Season Champion
x – Clinched playoff berth
e – Eliminated from playoff contention
Source: Overall standings and Commissioner's Cup Standings

== Playoffs ==
First Round: Best-of-3
**1** | **Minnesota Lynx** | **2**
8 | Golden State Valkyries | 0
4 | **Phoenix Mercury** | 2
5 | New York Liberty | 1
2 | **Las Vegas Aces** | **2**
7 | Seattle Storm | 1
3 | Atlanta Dream | 1
6 | **Indiana Fever** | **2**

Semifinals: Best-of-5
1 | Minnesota Lynx | 1
4 | **Phoenix Mercury** | **3**
2 | **Las Vegas Aces** | **3**
6 | Indiana Fever | 2

Finals: Best-of-7
4 | Phoenix Mercury | 0
2 | **Las Vegas Aces** | **4**

- **Bold** – Series winner
- Italic – Team with home-court-advantage

== Statistics ==
Legend
| GP | Games played | GS | Games started | MPG | Minutes per game | RPG | Rebounds per game |
| APG | Assists per game | SPG | Steals per game | BPG | Blocks per game | PPG | Points per game |
| FG% | Field-goal percentage | 3P% | 3-point field-goal percentage | FT% | Free-throw percentage | TO | Turnovers per game |
| PF | Fouls per game | | Team leader | | League leader |

=== Regular season ===
| Player | GP | GS | MPG | FG% | 3P% | FT% | RPG | APG | SPG | BPG | TO | PPG |
|---|---|---|---|---|---|---|---|---|---|---|---|---|
| Gabby Williams | 44 | 44 | 31.6 | 42.2% | 30.5% | 85.3% | 4.3 | 4.2 | 2.3 | 0.5 | 1.9 | 11.6 |
| Skylar Diggins | 43 | 43 | 31.2 | 42.3% | 36.5% | 78.8% | 2.5 | 6.0 | 1.2 | 0.8 | 2.1 | 15.5 |
| Nneka Ogwumike | 44 | 44 | 30.9 | 51.9% | 36.7% | 82.2% | 7.0 | 2.3 | 1.1 | 0.4 | 1.9 | 18.3 |
| Brittney Sykes | 14 | 13 | 30.0 | 38.6% | 27.8% | 77.0% | 2.7 | 3.3 | 1.2 | 0.4 | 2.1 | 11.8 |
| Ezi Magbegor | 44 | 44 | 27.3 | 49.3% | 53.4% | 68.7% | 6.2 | 2.1 | 0.7 | 2.2 | 1.0 | 8.0 |
| Erica Wheeler | 44 | 24 | 25.6 | 40.0% | 42.6% | 86.0% | 2.7 | 3.3 | 1.3 | 0.2 | 1.5 | 10.3 |
| Alysha Clark | 27 | 7 | 18.0 | 37.8% | 51.4% | 84.6% | 2.4 | 1.0 | 0.7 | 0.1 | 0.6 | 3.5 |
| Dominique Malonga | 42 | 0 | 14.3 | 55.1% | 22.2% | 56.9% | 4.6 | 0.9 | 0.4 | 0.7 | 1.1 | 7.7 |
| Tiffany Mitchell | 23 | 1 | 13.0 | 39.3% | 41.2% | 66.7% | 0.6 | 0.2 | 0.3 | 0.2 | 0.4 | 2.9 |
| Zia Cooke | 26 | 0 | 10.0 | 35.7% | 39.5% | 65.2% | 0.5 | 0.5 | 0.4 | 0.0 | 0.8 | 3.5 |
| Lexie Brown | 24 | 0 | 9.5 | 35.4% | 27.0% | 70.0% | 0.7 | 1.0 | 0.4 | 0.0 | 0.3 | 2.1 |
| Li Yueru | 9 | 0 | 8.7 | 30.0% | 50.0% | 91.7% | 1.6 | 0.7 | 0.1 | — | 0.8 | 2.8 |
| Mackenzie Holmes | 10 | 0 | 5.8 | 71.4% | — | — | 0.9 | 0.2 | 0.5 | 0.1 | — | 1.0 |

=== Playoffs ===
| Player | GP | GS | MPG | FG% | 3P% | FT% | RPG | APG | SPG | BPG | TO | PPG |
|---|---|---|---|---|---|---|---|---|---|---|---|---|
| Skylar Diggins | 3 | 3 | 32.3 | 40.9% | 64.3% | 75.0% | 2.3 | 5.0 | 1.7 | 0.7 | 2.3 | 17.0 |
| Nneka Ogwumike | 3 | 3 | 31.0 | 42.9% | 54.5% | 90.0% | 9.0 | 2.7 | 0.7 | — | 1.7 | 17.0 |
| Gabby Williams | 3 | 3 | 30.3 | 48.1% | 16.7% | 100.0% | 3.3 | 2.0 | 1.3 | — | 2.0 | 9.7 |
| Erica Wheeler | 3 | 0 | 26.7 | 38.9% | 29.4% | 100.0% | 2.0 | 3.0 | 1.0 | — | 1.0 | 12.3 |
| Ezi Magbegor | 3 | 3 | 24.7 | 58.3% | 0.0% | 25.0% | 4.3 | 2.3 | 1.0 | 1.0 | 0.7 | 5.0 |
| Dominique Malonga | 3 | 0 | 22.7 | 39.1% | 100.0% | 85.7% | 8.7 | 1.3 | 0.7 | 1.7 | 1.0 | 8.7 |
| Brittney Sykes | 3 | 3 | 22.0 | 42.9% | 0.0% | 50.0% | 2.3 | 0.7 | — | 0.3 | 3.7 | 4.3 |
| Tiffany Mitchell | 1 | 0 | 12.0 | 50.0% | 0.0% | 100.0% | 1.0 | 2.0 | — | — | — | 6.0 |
| Lexie Brown | 1 | 0 | 7.0 | 66.7% | 50.0% | — | 1.0 | — | — | — | — | 5.0 |
| Zia Cooke | 1 | 0 | 7.0 | 33.3% | — | 50.0% | — | 1.0 | — | — | 1.0 | 3.0 |
| Mackenzie Holmes | 1 | 0 | 5.0 | — | — | — | 1.0 | — | — | — | — | — |

== Awards and honors ==
| Recipient | Award | Date awarded | Ref. |
|---|---|---|---|
| Skylar Diggins | WNBA All-Star Reserve | July 7 | |
| Ezi Magbegor | WNBA All-Defensive Second Team | October 8 | |
| Dominique Malonga | AP All-Rookie Team | September 12 | |
| Dominique Malonga | WNBA All-Rookie Team | September 29 | |
| Nneka Ogwumike | Western Conference Player of the Week | June 24 | |
| Nneka Ogwumike | WNBA All-Star Starter | June 30 | |
| Nneka Ogwumike | AP All-WNBA Second Team | September 12 | |
| Nneka Ogwumike | Kim Perrot Sportsmanship Award | September 22 | |
| Nneka Ogwumike | All-WNBA Second Team | October 10 | |
| Gabby Williams | WNBA All-Star Reserve | July 7 | |
| Gabby Williams | WNBA All-Defensive First Team | October 8 | |
