= 2025 Washington Mystics season =

- Head coach: Sydney Johnson
- Arena: CareFirst Arena; EagleBank Arena

Results
- Record: 16–28 (.364)
- Place: 4th (Eastern)
- Playoff finish: Did not qualify

The 2025 Washington Mystics season was the franchise's 28th season in the Women's National Basketball Association, and their first season under head coach, Sydney Johnson.

On April 30, 2025, the Mystics announced that 2025 first round draft pick, Georgia Amoore, had suffered an ACL injury during training camp. And on May 1, 2025, it was announced that forward Aaliyah Edwards was diagnosed with a low back contusion and would be unavailable to play for at least two weeks.

== Draft ==
Round	Pick	Player	Position	Nationality	College/Club	Outcome	Ref.
1	3	Sonia Citron	PG	United States	Notre Dame	Signed rookie contract April 24; Made opening day roster	
1	4	Kiki Iriafen	F	United States	USC	Signed rookie contract April 24; Made opening day roster	
1	6	Georgia Amoore	G	Australia	Kentucky	Signed rookie contract April 22; Made opening day roster	
2	23	Lucy Olsen	G	United States	Iowa	Signed rookie contract April 22; Made opening day roster	
3	32	Zaay Green	G	United States	Alabama	Signed rookie contract April 22; Waived on May 14	

== Transactions ==
=== Front office and coaching ===
Date	Details	Ref.
October 23, 2024	Mutually agreed to part ways with both head coach, Eric Thibault, and general manager, Mike Thibault	
December 23, 2024	Hired Sydney Johnson as head coach	
December 23, 2024	Hired Jamila Wideman as general manager	
March 18, 2025	Hired Emre Vatansever and Jessie Miller as assistant coaches	
March 18, 2025	Shelley Patterson transitioned from assistant coach to Head of Domestic Scouting	
April 2, 2025	Hired Barbara Turner as an assistant coach	
April 2, 2025	Hired Clinton Crouch as head of player development	

=== Trades ===
February
February 23	To Washington Mystics 2025 No. 3 draft pick 2027 second round draft pick Rights to swap 2027 first round draft picks	To Chicago Sky Ariel Atkins
April
April 14	To Washington Mystics 2026 first round pick (Minnesota's own)	To Minnesota Lynx Karlie Samuelson
August
August 5	To Washington Mystics Alysha Clark; Zia Cooke; 2026 first round pick (Seattle's own)	To Seattle Storm Brittney Sykes
August 7	To Washington Mystics Jacy Sheldon; Right to swap 2026 first round picks (Washington with Minnesota's own and Connecticut with New York's own acquired from prior trades)	To Connecticut Sun Aaliyah Edwards

=== Free agency ===
==== Re-signed ====
Player	Date	Notes	Ref.
Emily Engstler	February 4	Training camp contract	
Sug Sutton	February 4	Training camp contract	

==== Additions ====
Player	Date	Notes	Former Team	Ref.
Taylor Soule	February 11	Training camp contract	Zagłębie Sosnowiec (Poland)	
Khadijiah Cave	April 19	Training camp contract	Botaş SK (Turkey)	
Morgan Jones	April 19	Training camp contract	MGS Panserraikos Serres (Greece)	
JoJo Lacey	April 19	Training camp contract	Rutgers Scarlet Knights	
Ashten Prechtel	April 19	Training camp contract	TFSE-MTK Budapest (Hungary)	
Georgia Amoore	April 22	Rookie contract (2025 draft pick – No. 6)	Kentucky Wildcats	
Zaay Green	April 22	Rookie contract (2025 draft pick – No. 32)	Alabama Crimson Tide	
Lucy Olsen	April 22	Rookie contract (2025 draft pick – No. 23)	Iowa Hawkeyes	
Sonia Citron	April 24	Rookie contract (2025 draft pick – No. 3)	Notre Dame Fighting Irish	
Kiki Iriafen	April 24	Rookie contract (2025 draft pick – No. 4)	USC Trojans	
Lauren Jensen	May 8	Training camp contract	Creighton Bluejays	
Madison Scott	August 14	7-day contract	Free agent	
Madison Scott	August 21	7-day contract	Free agent	
Madison Scott	August 28	7-day contract	Free agent	
Madison Scott	September 4	Rest of season contract	Free agent	

=== Subtractions / unsigned ===
Player	Date	Reason	New Team	Ref.
Txell Alarcón	April 10, 2023	Unsigned draft pick (2023 draft pick – No. 32)	N/A – retained rights	
Nastja Claessens	April 15, 2024	Unsigned draft pick (2024 draft pick – No. 30)	N/A – retained rights	
Julie Vanloo	December 6	Expansion draft	Golden State Valkyries	
Marica Gajić	December 30	Renounced rights	—	
Bernadett Határ	February 1	Free agency – reserved (qualifying offer extended)	Not signed – rights retained	
Shatori Walker-Kimbrough	February 1	Free agency – unrestricted	Atlanta Dream	
Taylor Soule	April 1	Waived	—	
Elena Delle Donne	April 4	Retired	N/A	
Morgan Jones	May 4	Waived	—	
JoJo Lacey	May 4	Waived	—	
Khadijah Cave	May 14	Waived	—	
Zaay Green	May 14	Waived	—	
Lauren Jensen	May 14	Waived	—	
Ashten Prechtel	May 14	Waived	—	
Sika Koné	July 18	Suspended contract – temporary	N/A – retained rights	
Sika Koné	August 5	Waived	Atlanta Dream	
Zia Cooke	August 5	Waived	Seattle Storm	

== Roster ==
2025 Washington Mystics roster
Players
Coaches

Pos.	No.	Nat.	Name	Height	Weight	DOB	From	Yrs
G	8	(Australia)	Amoore, Georgia (injured)	5' 6" (1.68m)		2001-04-03	Kentucky	R
F/C	0	(United States)	Austin, Shakira	6' 5" (1.96m)	190 lb (86kg)	2000-07-25	Mississippi	3
G/F	22	(United States)	Citron, Sonia	6' 1" (1.85m)		2003-10-22	Notre Dame	R
F	32	(United States)	Clark, Alysha	5' 11" (1.8m)	167 lb (76kg)	1987-07-07	Middle Tennessee	12
C	31	(United States)	Dolson, Stefanie	6' 5" (1.96m)	235 lb (107kg)	1992-01-08	Connecticut	11
F	21	(United States)	Engstler, Emily	6' 1" (1.85m)	180 lb (82kg)	2000-05-01	Louisville	3
F	44	(United States)	Iriafen, Kiki	6' 3" (1.91m)		2003-08-26	USC	R
G	5	(Australia)	Melbourne, Jade	5' 10" (1.78m)	145 lb (66kg)	2002-08-18	Australia	2
G	33	(United States)	Olsen, Lucy	5' 10" (1.78m)		2003-05-26	Iowa	R
G	4	(United States)	Sheldon, Jacy (injured)	5' 10" (1.78m)	140 lb (64kg)	2000-08-23	Ohio State	1
F	24	(United States)	Scott, Madison	6' 2" (1.88m)		2001-12-27	Mississippi	R
G	1	(United States)	Sutton, Sug	5' 8" (1.73m)	140 lb (64kg)	1998-12-17	Texas	3
G	–	(Spain)	Alarcón, Txell (DP)	5' 10" (1.78m)		2003-07-31	Spain	–
F	–	(Belgium)	Claessens, Nastja (DP)	6' 1" (1.85m)		2004-12-02	Belgium	–

Head coach
(United States) Sydney Johnson (Princeton)
Assistant coaches
(United States) Jessie Miller (UIC)
(United States) Barbara Turner (Connecticut)
(Turkey) Emre Vatansever
Player development
(United States) Clinton Crouch (Saint Francis)
Athletic trainer
(United States) Christina Kennedy

Legend

- (C) Team captain
- (DP) Unsigned draft pick
- (FA) Free agent
- (S) Suspended
- Injured

=== Depth ===
Pos.	Starter	Bench
PG	Sug Sutton	Georgia Amoore; Lucy Olsen; Jacy Sheldon
SG	Jade Melbourne	Alysha Clark
SF	Sonia Citron	Emily Engstler
PF	Kiki Iriafen
C	Shakira Austin	Stefanie Dolson

== Schedule ==
=== Preseason ===
2025 pre-season game log
Total: 0–2 (Home: 0–1; Road: 0–1)
May: 0–2 (Home: 0–1; Road: 0–1)

Game	Date	Team	Score	High points	High rebounds	High assists	Location Attendance	Record
1	May 3	@ Indiana	L 74–79 (OT)	Brittney Sykes (18)	Stefanie Dolson (8)	Sug Sutton (5)	Gainbridge Fieldhouse; 12,461	0–1
2	May 7	Atlanta	L 70–80	Brittney Sykes (13)	Ashten Prechtel (7)	Zaay Green (4)	CareFirst Arena; 4,200	0–2

2025 pre-season schedule

=== Regular season ===
2025 game log
Total: 16–28 (Home: 10–12; Road: 6–16)
May: 3–4 (Home: 2–1; Road: 1–3)

Game	Date	Team	Score	High points	High rebounds	High assists	Location Attendance	Record
1	May 16	Atlanta	W 94–90	Brittney Sykes (22)	Engstler, Melbourne (5)	Brittney Sykes (5)	CareFirst Arena; 4,200	1–0
2	May 18	@ Connecticut	W 90–85	Brittney Sykes (27)	Kiki Iriafen (14)	Brittney Sykes (7)	Mohegan Sun Arena; 7,834	2–0
3	May 21	@ Golden State	L 74–76	Brittney Sykes (30)	Kiki Iriafen (12)	Jade Melbourne (7)	Chase Center; 18,064	2–1
4	May 23	@ Las Vegas	L 72–75	Sonia Citron (19)	Kiki Iriafen (13)	Stefanie Dolson (8)	Michelob Ultra Arena; 10,509	2–2
5	May 25	@ Phoenix	L 62–68	Sonia Citron (14)	Kiki Iriafen (13)	Brittney Sykes (5)	PHX Arena; 10,065	2–3
6	May 28	Indiana	W 83–77	Brittney Sykes (21)	Brittney Sykes (9)	Jade Melbourne (5)	CFG Bank Arena; 11,183	3–3
7	May 30	New York	L 63–85	Brittney Sykes (20)	Kiki Iriafen (7)	Brittney Sykes (3)	CareFirst Arena; 4,200	3–4

June : 5–5 (Home: 3–2; Road: 2–3)

Game	Date	Team	Score	High points	High rebounds	High assists	Location Attendance	Record
8	June 3	@ Indiana	L 76–85	Kiki Iriafen (20)	Kiki Iriafen (9)	Brittney Sykes (4)	Gainbridge Fieldhouse; 16,013	3–5
9	June 5	New York	L 78–86	Kiki Iriafen (17)	Shakira Austin (11)	Brittney Sykes (5)	CareFirst Arena; 4,200	3–6
10	June 8	Connecticut	W 104–67	Brittney Sykes (28)	Emily Engstler (9)	Brittney Sykes (6)	CareFirst Arena; 4,200	4–6
11	June 15	Atlanta	L 56–89	Sonia Citron (10)	Kiki Iriafen (8)	Sug Sutton (4)	CareFirst Arena; 4,200	4–7
12	June 17	@ Chicago	W 79–72	Brittney Sykes (32)	Austin, Citron (9)	Sug Sutton (6)	Wintrust Arena; 7,579	5–7
13	June 20	@ Atlanta	L 91–92	Shakira Austin (28)	Shakira Austin (10)	Brittney Sykes (8)	Gateway Center Arena; 3,265	5–8
14	June 22	Dallas	W 91–88 (OT)	Sonia Citron (27)	Sonia Citron (11)	Kiki Iriafen (6)	CareFirst Arena; 4,200	6–8
15	June 24	Minnesota	W 68–64	Shakira Austin (19)	Kiki Iriafen (11)	Jade Melbourne (5)	CareFirst Arena; 4,200	7–8
16	June 26	@ Las Vegas	W 94–83	Sonia Citron (21)	Shakira Austin (13)	Sug Sutton (5)	Michelob Ultra Arena; 10,427	8–8
17	June 28	@ Dallas	L 71–79	Sonia Citron (22)	Sonia Citron (10)	Brittney Sykes (5)	College Park Center; 6,006	8–9

July : 5–5 (Home: 4–3; Road: 1–2)

Game	Date	Team	Score	High points	High rebounds	High assists	Location Attendance	Record
18	July 3	@ Minnesota	L 75–92	Lucy Olsen (19)	Kiki Iriafen (7)	Jade Melbourne (4)	Target Center; 8,824	8–10
19	July 8	Chicago	W 81–79	Shakira Austin (15)	Kiki Iriafen (10)	Austin, Sykes (4)	EagleBank Arena; 9,350	9–10
20	July 10	Las Vegas	W 70–68	Brittney Sykes (18)	Austin, Iriafen (8)	Sug Sutton (6)	EagleBank Arena; 9,350	10–10
21	July 13	@ Seattle	W 74–69	Brittney Sykes (19)	Kiki Iriafen (10)	Shakira Austin (5)	Climate Pledge Arena; 11,126	11–10
22	July 15	@ Los Angeles	L 80–99	Shakira Austin (16)	Austin, Iriafen (8)	Sonia Citron (6)	Crypto.com Arena; 10,787	11–11
All-Star Game
23	July 22	Los Angeles	L 86–93	Brittney Sykes (18)	Shakira Austin (6)	Sonia Citron (6)	CareFirst Arena; 4,200	11–12
24	July 26	Seattle	W 69–58	Shakira Austin (14)	Austin, Iriafen (11)	Brittney Sykes (5)	CareFirst Arena; 4,200	12–12
25	July 27	Phoenix	L 72–88	Shakira Austin (20)	Kiki Iriafen (10)	Melbourne, Sykes (4)	CareFirst Arena; 4,200	12–13
26	July 29	Chicago	W 103–86	Sonia Citron (28)	Kiki Iriafen (10)	Brittney Sykes (6)	CareFirst Arena; 4,200	13–13
27	July 31	Golden State	L 67–68	Sonia Citron (16)	Shakira Austin (9)	Sug Sutton (6)	CareFirst Arena; 4,200	13–14

August : 3–11 (Home: 1–4; Road: 2–7)

Game	Date	Team	Score	High points	High rebounds	High assists	Location Attendance	Record
28	August 3	@ Atlanta	L 83–99	Kiki Iriafen (22)	Kiki Iriafen (5)	Citron, Iriafen, Sutton, Sykes (4)	Gateway Center Arena; 3,315	13–15
29	August 5	@ Chicago	L 64–78	Sonia Citron (13)	Kiki Iriafen (6)	Sug Sutton (5)	Wintrust Arena; 6,572	13–16
30	August 8	@ Minnesota	L 76–80	Sonia Citron (26)	Kiki Iriafen (9)	Citron, Iriafen, Sutton (4)	Target Center; 8,821	13–17
31	August 10	@ Dallas	W 91–78	Kiki Iriafen (23)	Kiki Iriafen (10)	Sonia Citron (6)	College Park Center; 6,152	14–17
32	August 13	Golden State	L 83–88	Citron, Sutton (15)	Kiki Iriafen (10)	Sug Sutton (7)	CareFirst Arena; 4,200	14–18
33	August 15	@ Indiana	W 88–84	Sonia Citron (21)	Kiki Iriafen (12)	Jade Melbourne (5)	Gainbridge Fieldhouse; 16,006	15–18
34	August 17	Los Angeles	W 95–86	Sonia Citron (24)	Kiki Iriafen (10)	Sug Sutton (7)	CareFirst Arena; 4,200	16–18
35	August 19	Connecticut	L 69–80	Sonia Citron (19)	Kiki Iriafen (12)	Sug Sutton (7)	CareFirst Arena; 4,200	16–19
36	August 21	@ Connecticut	L 56–67	Sonia Citron (15)	Kiki Iriafen (10)	Sug Sutton (6)	Mohegan Sun Arena; 7,144	16–20
37	August 23	Las Vegas	L 81–91	Kiki Iriafen (21)	Kiki Iriafen (15)	Jade Melbourne (6)	CareFirst Arena; 4,200	16–21
38	August 24	Seattle	L 82–84	Shakira Austin (30)	Citron, Iriafen (6)	Sug Sutton (9)	CareFirst Arena; 4,200	16–22
39	August 28	@ New York	L 63–89	Sonia Citron (18)	Shakira Austin (5)	Clark, Engstler (4)	Barclays Center; 15,015	16–23
40	August 30	@ Golden State	L 62–99	Sug Sutton (17)	Alysha Clark (6)	Jade Melbourne (4)	Chase Center; 18,064	16–24
41	August 31	@ Los Angeles	L 78–81	Kiki Iriafen (22)	Kiki Iriafen (13)	Melbourne, Sutton (5)	Crypto.com Arena; 12,218	16–25

September : 0–3 (Home: 0–2; Road: 0–1)

Game	Date	Team	Score	High points	High rebounds	High assists	Location Attendance	Record
42	September 4	Phoenix	L 69–75	Kiki Iriafen (18)	Kiki Iriafen (13)	Sug Sutton (8)	CareFirst Arena; 4,200	16–26
43	September 7	Indiana	L 65–94	Sonia Citron (17)	Austin, Engstler (7)	Jade Melbourne (5)	CFG Bank Arena; 11,183	16–27
44	September 9	@ New York	L 66–75	Kiki Iriafen (16)	Kiki Iriafen (6)	Austin, Citron (4)	Barclays Center; 17,532	16–28

2025 season schedule

Notes:

- Games highlighted in ██ represent Commissioner's Cup games.

== Standings ==
#	Team	W	L	PCT	GB	Conf.	Home	Road	Cup
1	yx – Minnesota Lynx	34	10	.773	–	20–4	20–2	14–8	5–1
2	x – Las Vegas Aces	30	14	.682	4	16–8	17–5	13–9	2–4
3	x – Atlanta Dream	30	14	.682	4	15–6	16–6	14–8	3–2
4	x – Phoenix Mercury	27	17	.614	7	13–11	15–7	12–10	4–2
5	x – New York Liberty	27	17	.614	7	15–5	17–5	10–12	4–1
6	cx – Indiana Fever	24	20	.545	10	13–8	13–9	11–11	4–1
7	x – Seattle Storm	23	21	.523	11	12–12	10–12	13–9	4–2
8	x – Golden State Valkyries	23	21	.523	11	9–15	14–8	9–13	3–3
9	e – Los Angeles Sparks	21	23	.477	13	10–14	9–13	12–10	2–4
10	e – Washington Mystics	16	28	.364	18	8–12	10–12	6–16	2–3
11	e – Connecticut Sun	11	33	.250	23	7–14	7–15	4–18	1–4
12	e – Chicago Sky	10	34	.227	24	4–17	6–16	4–18	1–4
13	e – Dallas Wings	10	34	.227	24	4–20	6–16	4–18	1–5

Notes

(#) – League Standing
c – Commissioner's Cup winners
y – Regular Season Champion
x – Clinched playoff berth
e – Eliminated from playoff contention
Source: Overall standings and Commissioner's Cup Standings

== Statistics ==
Legend
GP	Games played	GS	Games started	MPG	Minutes per game	RPG	Rebounds per game
APG	Assists per game	SPG	Steals per game	BPG	Blocks per game	PPG	Points per game
FG%	Field-goal percentage	3P%	3-point field-goal percentage	FT%	Free-throw percentage	TO	Turnovers per game
PF	Fouls per game		Team leader		League leader

=== Regular season ===
Player	GP	GS	MPG	FG%	3P%	FT%	RPG	APG	SPG	BPG	TO	PPG
Sonia Citron	44	44	32.2	47.0%	44.5%	87.2%	4.0	2.4	1.3	0.4	2.1	14.9
Brittney Sykes	25	25	31.0	37.9%	31.8%	78.5%	3.4	4.4	1.2	0.3	2.7	15.4
Kiki Iriafen	44	44	26.9	48.8%	18.2%	78.4%	8.5	1.6	0.6	0.2	2.2	13.3
Sug Sutton	43	43	26.1	42.2%	35.3%	77.1%	1.8	3.9	0.8	0.1	1.9	7.4
Jade Melbourne	43	12	23.4	40.0%	27.4%	67.1%	1.9	2.9	0.6	0.2	1.7	5.9
Shakira Austin	38	30	23.0	46.5%	13.3%	66.4%	6.4	1.8	1.1	1.1	2.4	12.7
Alysha Clark	15	8	22.9	36.2%	24.4%	61.5%	3.5	1.5	0.5	0.1	0.3	4.5
Jacy Sheldon	2	0	16.0	40.0%	16.7%	80.0%	1.5	0.5	—	—	0.5	6.5
Stefanie Dolson	43	14	15.2	42.3%	36.0%	70.0%	2.3	1.4	0.3	0.3	0.7	3.7
Aaliyah Edwards	21	0	13.3	47.9%	0.0%	62.5%	3.3	0.4	0.5	0.3	1.1	6.0
Emily Engstler	40	0	12.8	39.6%	25.4%	66.7%	3.3	1.5	0.7	0.7	1.0	3.7
Lucy Olsen	41	0	12.4	41.5%	27.1%	82.4%	1.2	1.2	0.4	0.1	0.5	4.0
Sika Koné	11	0	6.7	38.9%	33.3%	88.9%	1.5	0.5	—	—	0.5	2.1
Madison Scott	9	0	5.2	45.5%	0.0%	100.0%	0.1	0.2	—	0.2	0.1	1.6

== Awards and honors ==
Recipient	Award	Date awarded	Ref.
Shakira Austin	Eastern Conference Player of the Week	June 24	
Shakira Austin	AP Comeback Player of the Year	September 12	
Sonia Citron	WNBA All-Star Reserve	July 7	
Sonia Citron	AP All-Rookie Team	September 12	
Sonia Citron	WNBA All-Rookie Team	September 29	
Kiki Iriafen	Rookie of the Month – May	June 4	
Kiki Iriafen	WNBA All-Star Reserve	July 7	
Kiki Iriafen	AP All-Rookie Team	September 12	
Kiki Iriafen	WNBA All-Rookie Team	September 29	
Brittney Sykes	WNBA All-Star Reserve (replacement player)	July 17	
