= 2025 Atlanta Dream season =

- Head coach: Karl Smesko
- Arena: Gateway Center Arena; State Farm Arena

Results
- Record: 30–14 (.682)
- Place: 1st (Eastern)
- Playoff finish: 3rd seed Lost in First Round 1–2 to Indiana Fever

The 2025 Atlanta Dream season was the 18th season for the Atlanta Dream of the Women's National Basketball Association, and their first season under head coach, Karl Smesko.

The Dream started the season with a road loss to Washington 90–94 before defeating Indiana 91–90 on the road. They would lose the home rematch to Indiana before ending May on a four game winning streak. The highlight of the streak was a 79–55 defeat of Connecticut. The streak ended in the first game of June where they lost at Connecticut to begin Commissioner's Cup play. They would win their next three Commissioner's Cup games, including a thirty-three point victory over Washington. They lost their final Cup game 81–86 to New York to finish 3–2 and not qualify for the Final. They finished June 3–2, defeating Washington, Chicago, and New York. They lost the only two games they played against the Western Conference in the month, against Dallas and Minnesota, the latter coming in overtime. The Dream continued to play .500 basketball as they went 2–3 in their final games before the All-Star Break. They suffered a one-point loss to Seattle and a six-point loss to New York over that stretch. However, in the same streak they defeated Chicago by thirty-nine points. After the All-Star Break they went 3–2 to finish July with a 5–5 overall record. They lost to Las Vegas and Golden State over that stretch, while defeating Phoenix, Minnesota, and Dallas. The Dream went on a five-game winning streak to begin August before losing the 2025 WNBA Canada game to Seattle. They won four of their next six games in August to finish the month 9–3. Their losses were both to Las Vegas over this stretch. They also earned a two-point win over Minnesota. The Dream finished September 5–0, defeating Connecticut three times and Los Angeles twice.

The Dream's 30–14 regular season recorded earned them the third seed in the 2025 WNBA playoffs, their highest seed since 2018. The Dream were matched with the sixth-seed Indiana in the first round. The Dream won the first game convincingly, 80–68 at home. The series moved to Indiana for game two, which the Fever won 77–60. Game three returned to Atlanta and was the closest game of the series. The Dream led by seven points at halftime, but could not convert that lead into victory, as they lost 85–87 to be eliminated from the Playoffs.

== Draft ==
Round	Pick	Player	Position	Nationality	College/Club	Outcome	Ref.
2	18	Te-Hina Paopao	G	United States	South Carolina	Signed rookie contract April 18; Made opening day roster	
3	36	Taylor Thierry	F	United States	Ohio State	Signed rookie contract April 18; Made opening day roster	

== Transactions ==
=== Front office and coaching ===
Date	Details	Ref.
October 2, 2024	Fired head coach, Tanisha Wright	
November 13, 2024	Hired Karl Smesko as head coach	
January 6, 2025	Hired LaToya Sanders and Brandi Poole as assistant coaches	
January 6, 2025	Promoted Brooklyn Cartwright to assistant general manager	
March 17, 2025	Hired Hannah Kronick Spencer as Vice President of Marketing and Consumer Insights	
March 17, 2025	Hired Kaila Pettis as Senior Director of Brand and Creative	
March 31, 2025	Hired Chelsea Lyles and Camryn Brown as assistant coaches	
April 24, 2025	Promoted Katie Buria to Head Athletic Trainer	
April 24, 2025	Hired Taylor Javey as an assistant athletic trainer	
April 24, 2025	Hired Shannon Jackson as a strength and conditioning coach	
April 24, 2025	Promoted Parker Sizemore to Data Analyst and Performance Coordinator	
April 24, 2025	Promoted Sydney Durrah to Senior Manager of Basketball Systems and Player Content Operations	
April 24, 2025	Hired Sheahen Dowling as special assistant to the head coach	
August 14, 2025	Hired Traci Messier as Vice President of Communications and External Affairs	

=== Free agency ===
==== Re-signed ====
Player	Date	Notes	Ref.
Maya Caldwell	January 18, 2025	Training camp contract	

==== Additions ====
Player	Date	Notes	Former Team	Ref.
Shatori Walker-Kimbrough	February 1	One-year deal	Washington Mystics	
Brittney Griner	February 1	One-year deal	Phoenix Mercury	
Brionna Jones	February 1	One-year deal	Connecticut Sun	
Holly Winterburn	February 5	Training camp contract	Beşiktaş HDI Sigorta (Turkey)	
Ashley Joens	March 6	Training camp contract	Athinaikos AS Vurona (Greece)	
Maria Gakdeng	April 17	Training camp contract	North Carolina Tar Heels	
Emani Jefferson	April 17	Training camp contract	Florida Gulf Coast Eagles	
Te-Hina Paopao	April 18	Rookie contract (2025 draft pick – No. 18)	South Carolina Gamecocks	
Taylor Thierry	April 18	Rookie contract (2025 draft pick – No. 36)	Ohio State Buckeyes	
DeYona Gaston	April 27	Training camp contract	Auburn Tigers	
Shyanne Sellers	May 5	Awarded off waivers	Golden State Valkyries	
Kamiah Smalls	August 1	7-day contract	Galatasaray (Turkey)	
Kamiah Smalls	August 8	7-day contract	Galatasaray (Turkey)	
Sika Koné	August 15	Rest of season contract	Free agent	

=== Subtractions / unsigned ===
Player	Date	Reason	New Team	Ref.
Maite Cazorla	January 16, 2022	Suspended contract – expired	—	
Ezinne Kalu	October 2, 2024	Free agency – unrestricted	Zhejiang Golden Bulls (China)	
Iliana Rupert	December 6, 2024	Expansion draft	Golden State Valkyries	
Danielle Robinson	January 1, 2025	Retired	N/A	
Lorela Cubaj	January 15, 2025	Free agency – reserved (qualifying offer extended)	Not signed – retained rights	
Laeticia Amihere	February 1, 2025	Waived	Golden State Valkyries	
Tina Charles	February 2, 2025	Free agency – uncoreable unrestricted	Connecticut Sun	
Cheyenne Parker-Tyus	February 6, 2025	Free agency – unrestricted	Las Vegas Aces	
Holly Winterburn	April 7, 2025	Suspended contract – full season	N/A – retained rights	
DeYona Gaston	May 5, 2025	Waived	—	
Maria Gakdeng	May 8, 2025	Waived	—	
Emani Jefferson	May 8, 2025	Waived	—	
Ashley Joens	May 10, 2025	Waived	—	
Shyanne Sellers	May 12, 2025	Waived	—	
Haley Jones	May 14, 2025	Waived	Dallas Wings	
Aerial Powers	June 10, 2025	Free agency – unrestricted	Golden State Valkyries	
Kamiah Smalls	August 13, 2025	Released	—	

== Roster ==
2025 Atlanta Dream roster
Players
Coaches

Pos.	No.	Nat.	Name	Height	Weight	DOB	From	Yrs
G	33	(United States)	Caldwell, Maya	5' 11" (1.8m)	160 lb (73kg)	1998-12-15	Georgia	3
G	3	(United States)	Canada, Jordin	5' 6" (1.68m)	135 lb (61kg)	1995-08-11	UCLA	7
F	12	(United States)	Coffey, Nia	6' 1" (1.85m)	182 lb (83kg)	1995-06-11	Northwestern	8
G	15	(United States)	Gray, Allisha	6' 0" (1.83m)	167 lb (76kg)	1995-01-12	South Carolina	8
C	42	(United States)	Griner, Brittney	6' 9" (2.06m)	205 lb (93kg)	1990-10-18	Baylor	11
F	00	(United States)	Hillmon, Naz	6' 2" (1.88m)	190 lb (86kg)	2000-04-05	Michigan	3
F	10	(United States)	Howard, Rhyne	6' 2" (1.88m)	175 lb (79kg)	2000-04-29	Kentucky	3
C	24	(United States)	Jones, Brionna	6' 3" (1.91m)	215 lb (98kg)	1995-12-18	Maryland	8
F	23	(Mali)	Koné, Sika	6' 3" (1.91m)	180 lb (82kg)	2002-07-13	Mali	2
F	5	(United States)	Thierry, Taylor	6' 1" (1.85m)		2003-01-08	Ohio State	R
G	2	(United States)	Paopao, Te-Hina	5' 9" (1.75m)		2002-08-21	South Carolina	R
G	32	(United States)	Walker-Kimbrough, Shatori	5' 9" (1.75m)	140 lb (64kg)	1995-05-18	Maryland	8
G	–	(Australia)	Borlase, Isobel (DP)	5' 11" (1.8m)		2004-09-12	Australia	–
F/C	–	(Italy)	Cubaj, Lorela (FA)	6' 4" (1.93m)	200 lb (91kg)	1999-01-08	Georgia Tech	3
F	–	(Australia)	Puoch, Nyadiew (DP)	6' 3" (1.91m)		2004-06-23	Australia	–
G	–	(Italy)	Villa, Matilde (DP)	5' 7" (1.7m)		2004-12-09	Italy	–
G	–	(United Kingdom)	Winterburn, Holly (S)	5' 11" (1.8m)		2000-10-01	Oregon / East London	–

Head coach
(United States) Karl Smesko (Kent State)
Assistant coaches
(United States) Camryn Brown (High Point)
(United States) Chelsea Lyles (Florida Gulf Coast)
(United States) Brandi Poole (Sewanee)
(United States) LaToya Sanders (North Carolina)
Athletic trainer
(United States) Katie Buria (Arkansas)
Strength and conditioning coach
(United States) Shannon Jackson (Auburn)

Legend

- (C) Team captain
- (DP) Unsigned draft pick
- (FA) Free agent
- (S) Suspended
- Injured

=== Depth chart ===
Pos.	Starter	Bench
PG	Jordin Canada	Te-Hina Paopao
SG	Allisha Gray	Maya Caldwell; Shatori Walker-Kimbrough
SF	Rhyne Howard	Nia Coffey
PF	Brionna Jones	Naz Hillmon
C	Brittney Griner

== Schedule ==
=== Preseason ===
2025 pre-season game log
Total: 1–1 (Home: 0–1; Road: 1–0)
May: 1–1 (Home: 0–1; Road: 1–0)

Game	Date	Team	Score	High points	High rebounds	High assists	Location Attendance	Record
1	May 7	@ Washington	W 80–70	Brittney Griner (16)	Brittney Griner (10)	Te-Hina Paopao (4)	CareFirst Arena; 4,200	1–0
2	May 10	Indiana	L 76–81	Te-Hina Paopao (14)	Allisha Gray (6)	Allisha Gray (4)	Gateway Center Arena; 3,265	1–1

2025 pre-season schedule

=== Regular season ===
2025 game log
Total: 30–14 (Home: 16–6; Road: 14–8)
May: 5–2 (Home: 2–1; Road: 3–1)

Game	Date	Team	Score	High points	High rebounds	High assists	Location Attendance	Record
1	May 16	@ Washington	L 90–94	Allisha Gray (25)	Brionna Jones (10)	Allisha Gray (7)	CareFirst Arena; 4,200	0–1
2	May 20	@ Indiana	W 91–90	Brittney Griner (21)	Brionna Jones (13)	Allisha Gray (6)	Gainbridge Fieldhouse; 16,269	1–1
3	May 22	Indiana	L 76–81	Rhyne Howard (24)	Brionna Jones (11)	Jones, Paopao (3)	State Farm Arena; 17,044	1–2
4	May 24	Dallas	W 83–75	Allisha Gray (27)	Brionna Jones (15)	Rhyne Howard (10)	Gateway Center Arena; 3,265	2–2
5	May 25	Connecticut	W 79–55	Nia Coffey (18)	Nia Coffey (11)	Maya Caldwell (6)	Gateway Center Arena; 3,265	3–2
6	May 27	@ Los Angeles	W 88–82	Allisha Gray (25)	Rhyne Howard (9)	Rhyne Howard (7)	Crypto.com Arena; 10,797	4–2
7	May 30	@ Seattle	W 94–87	Rhyne Howard (33)	Naz Hillmon (7)	Rhyne Howard (5)	Climate Pledge Arena; 9,666	5–2

June : 6–4 (Home: 5–1; Road: 1–3)

Game	Date	Team	Score	High points	High rebounds	High assists	Location Attendance	Record
8	June 6	@ Connecticut	L 76–84	Brittney Griner (18)	Brittney Griner (6)	Rhyne Howard (6)	Mohegan Sun Arena; 8,078	5–3
9	June 10	Indiana	W 77–58	Allisha Gray (23)	Brionna Jones (10)	Canada, Hillmon, Howard (5)	Gateway Center Arena; 3,265	6–3
10	June 13	Chicago	W 88–70	Rhyne Howard (36)	Brionna Jones (11)	Jordin Canada (8)	Gateway Center Arena; 3,296	7–3
11	June 15	@ Washington	W 89–56	Allisha Gray (32)	Naz Hillmon (11)	Hillmon, Paopao (5)	CareFirst Arena; 4,200	8–3
12	June 17	@ New York	L 81–86	Te-Hina Paopao (16)	Hillmon, Howard (7)	Rhyne Howard (9)	Barclays Center; 15,149	8–4
13	June 20	Washington	W 92–91	Allisha Gray (18)	Brittney Griner (7)	Howard, Jones (6)	Gateway Center Arena; 3,265	9–4
14	June 22	Chicago	W 93–80	Rhyne Howard (22)	Brionna Jones (11)	Gray, Hillmon (4)	Gateway Center Arena; 3,283	10–4
15	June 24	@ Dallas	L 55–68	Rhyne Howard (23)	Rhyne Howard (8)	Naz Hillmon (3)	College Park Center; 6,251	10–5
16	June 27	Minnesota	L 92–96 (OT)	Brionna Jones (18)	Gray, Hillmon, Jones (8)	Rhyne Howard (8)	Gateway Center Arena; 3,265	10–6
17	June 29	New York	W 90–81	Brionna Jones (21)	Allisha Gray (9)	Jordin Canada (8)	Gateway Center Arena; 3,265	11–6

July : 5–5 (Home: 1–2; Road: 4–3)

Game	Date	Team	Score	High points	High rebounds	High assists	Location Attendance	Record
18	July 3	Seattle	L 79–80	Jordin Canada (25)	Allisha Gray (11)	Jordin Canada (5)	Gateway Center Arena; 3,265	11–7
19	July 7	Golden State	W 90–81	Allisha Gray (24)	Brionna Jones (8)	Jordin Canada (9)	Gateway Center Arena; 3,265	12–7
20	July 11	@ Indiana	L 82–99	Jordin Canada (30)	Brittney Griner (8)	Jordin Canada (8)	Gainbridge Fieldhouse; 16,966	12–8
21	July 13	@ New York	L 72–79	Allisha Gray (16)	Brittney Griner (10)	Jordin Canada (6)	Barclays Center; 17,265	12–9
22	July 16	@ Chicago	W 86–49	Brittney Griner (15)	Brionna Jones (9)	Jordin Canada (8)	Wintrust Arena; 9,025	13–9
All-Star Game
23	July 22	@ Las Vegas	L 72–87	Allisha Gray (24)	Allisha Gray (8)	Jordin Canada (6)	Michelob Ultra Arena; 10,361	13–10
24	July 23	@ Phoenix	W 90–79	Allisha Gray (28)	Brittney Griner (8)	Canada, Gray (6)	PHX Arena; 11,850	14–10
25	July 27	@ Minnesota	W 90–86	Brittney Griner (22)	Naz Hillmon (9)	Te-Hina Paopao (4)	Target Center; 8,788	15–10
26	July 29	Golden State	L 75–77	Jordin Canada (21)	Naz Hillmon (8)	Jordin Canada (8)	Gateway Center Arena; 3,265	15–11
27	July 30	@ Dallas	W 88–85	Naz Hillmon (21)	Te-Hina Paopao (8)	Allisha Gray (7)	College Park Center; 5,228	16–11

August : 9–3 (Home: 5–2; Road: 4–1)

Game	Date	Team	Score	High points	High rebounds	High assists	Location Attendance	Record
28	August 1	Phoenix	W 95–72	Allisha Gray (26)	Naz Hillmon (9)	Jordin Canada (11)	Gateway Center Arena; 3,283	17–11
29	August 3	Washington	W 99–83	Brionna Jones (23)	Naz Hillmon (13)	Jordin Canada (9)	Gateway Center Arena; 3,315	18–11
30	August 7	@ Chicago	W 86–65	Allisha Gray (25)	Naz Hillmon (11)	Jordin Canada (6)	Wintrust Arena; 7,221	19–11
31	August 10	@ Phoenix	W 74–66	Allisha Gray (17)	Naz Hillmon (13)	Allisha Gray (5)	PHX Arena; 13,953	20–11
32	August 13	@ Seattle	W 85–75	Rhyne Howard (25)	Allisha Gray (11)	Rhyne Howard (7)	Climate Pledge Arena; 10,687	21–11
33	August 15	Seattle	L 78–80	Rhyne Howard (21)	Brionna Jones (10)	Allisha Gray (4)	Rogers Arena; 15,892	21–12
34	August 17	@ Golden State	W 79–63	Rhyne Howard (14)	Brionna Jones (9)	Rhyne Howard (6)	Chase Center; 18,064	22–12
35	August 19	@ Las Vegas	L 72–74	Rhyne Howard (19)	Brittney Griner (8)	Rhyne Howard (6)	Michelob Ultra Arena; 10,420	22–13
36	August 21	Minnesota	W 75–73	Allisha Gray (27)	Naz Hillmon (9)	Te-Hina Paopao (4)	Gateway Center Arena; 3,265	23–13
37	August 23	New York	W 78–62	Allisha Gray (19)	Hillmon, Howard, Jones (8)	Rhyne Howard (6)	Gateway Center Arena; 3,305	24–13
38	August 27	Las Vegas	L 75–81	Howard, Jones (19)	Naz Hillmon (15)	Rhyne Howard (7)	Gateway Center Arena; 3,326	24–14
39	August 29	Dallas	W 100–78	Rhyne Howard (24)	Te-Hina Paopao (6)	Te-Hina Paopao (8)	Gateway Center Arena; 3,268	25–14

September : 5–0 (Home: 3–0; Road: 2–0)

Game	Date	Team	Score	High points	High rebounds	High assists	Location Attendance	Record
40	September 1	@ Connecticut	W 93–76	Rhyne Howard (23)	Brionna Jones (11)	Naz Hillmon (6)	Mohegan Sun Arena; 8,081	26–14
41	September 3	Los Angeles	W 86–75	Rhyne Howard (19)	Brionna Jones (13)	Jordin Canada (10)	Gateway Center Arena; 3,265	27–14
42	September 5	Los Angeles	W 104–85	Rhyne Howard (37)	Hillmon, Jones (9)	Jordin Canada (8)	Gateway Center Arena; 3,314	28–14
43	September 8	Connecticut	W 87–62	Rhyne Howard (18)	Allisha Gray (6)	Canada, Howard (6)	Gateway Center Arena; 3,319	29–14
44	September 10	@ Connecticut	W 88–72	Brittney Griner (17)	Maya Caldwell (9)	Te-Hina Paopao (6)	Mohegan Sun Arena; 7,508	30–14

2025 season schedule

Notes:

- Games highlighted in ██ represent Commissioner's Cup games.
- Game highlighted in ██ represents the 2025 WNBA Canada game.

=== Playoffs ===
2025 playoff game log
First round vs. Indiana Fever
Lost Series 1–2

Game	Date	Team	Score	High points	High rebounds	High assists	Location Attendance	Series
1	September 14	Indiana	W 80–68	Gray, Howard (20)	Naz Hillmon (9)	Canada, Gray (4)	Gateway Center Arena; 3,800	1–0
2	September 16	@ Indiana	L 60–77	Te-Hina Paopao (11)	Gray, Hillmon (7)	Jordin Canada (6)	Gainbridge Fieldhouse; 16,682	1–1
3	September 18	Indiana	L 85–87	Allisha Gray (19)	Allisha Gray (12)	Jordin Canada (10)	Gateway Center Arena; 3,800	1–2

2025 playoff schedule

== Standings ==
#	Team	W	L	PCT	GB	Conf.	Home	Road	Cup
1	yx – Minnesota Lynx	34	10	.773	–	20–4	20–2	14–8	5–1
2	x – Las Vegas Aces	30	14	.682	4	16–8	17–5	13–9	2–4
3	x – Atlanta Dream	30	14	.682	4	15–6	16–6	14–8	3–2
4	x – Phoenix Mercury	27	17	.614	7	13–11	15–7	12–10	4–2
5	x – New York Liberty	27	17	.614	7	15–5	17–5	10–12	4–1
6	cx – Indiana Fever	24	20	.545	10	13–8	13–9	11–11	4–1
7	x – Seattle Storm	23	21	.523	11	12–12	10–12	13–9	4–2
8	x – Golden State Valkyries	23	21	.523	11	9–15	14–8	9–13	3–3
9	e – Los Angeles Sparks	21	23	.477	13	10–14	9–13	12–10	2–4
10	e – Washington Mystics	16	28	.364	18	8–12	10–12	6–16	2–3
11	e – Connecticut Sun	11	33	.250	23	7–14	7–15	4–18	1–4
12	e – Chicago Sky	10	34	.227	24	4–17	6–16	4–18	1–4
13	e – Dallas Wings	10	34	.227	24	4–20	6–16	4–18	1–5

Notes

(#) – League Standing
c – Commissioner's Cup winners
y – Regular Season Champion
x – Clinched playoff berth
e – Eliminated from playoff contention
Source: Overall standings and Commissioner's Cup Standings

== Playoffs ==
First Round: Best-of-3
**1**	**Minnesota Lynx**	**2**
8	Golden State Valkyries	0
4	**Phoenix Mercury**	2
5	New York Liberty	1
2	**Las Vegas Aces**	**2**
7	Seattle Storm	1
3	Atlanta Dream	1
6	**Indiana Fever**	**2**

Semifinals: Best-of-5
1	Minnesota Lynx	1
4	**Phoenix Mercury**	**3**
2	**Las Vegas Aces**	**3**
6	Indiana Fever	2

Finals: Best-of-7
4	Phoenix Mercury	0
2	**Las Vegas Aces**	**4**

- **Bold** – Series winner
- Italic – Team with home-court-advantage

== Statistics ==
Legend
GP	Games played	GS	Games started	MPG	Minutes per game	RPG	Rebounds per game
APG	Assists per game	SPG	Steals per game	BPG	Blocks per game	PPG	Points per game
FG%	Field-goal percentage	3P%	3-point field-goal percentage	FT%	Free-throw percentage	TO	Turnovers per game
PF	Fouls per game		Team leader		League leader

=== Regular season ===
Player	GP	GS	MPG	FG%	3P%	FT%	RPG	APG	SPG	BPG	TO	PPG
Rhyne Howard	33	32	34.9	37.5%	32.2%	85.6%	4.5	4.6	1.5	0.8	1.7	17.5
Allisha Gray	42	42	34.5	45.1%	38.4%	79.9%	5.3	3.5	1.1	0.4	1.8	18.4
Jordin Canada	28	26	28.0	39.6%	29.1%	76.0%	3.3	5.7	1.7	0.3	2.2	11.2
Brionna Jones	44	44	26.6	52.7%	26.1%	77.3%	7.3	2.2	1.1	0.8	1.5	12.8
Naz Hillmon	44	17	25.5	46.3%	32.1%	83.1%	6.2	2.4	0.5	0.4	1.1	8.6
Brittney Griner	39	25	20.8	51.8%	26.3%	76.5%	5.2	0.8	0.1	1.2	1.5	9.8
Maya Caldwell	41	16	18.5	42.6%	35.5%	80.0%	3.1	1.8	0.9	0.2	1.0	5.4
Te-Hina Paopao	43	15	16.7	44.0%	38.6%	53.8%	1.6	2.4	0.5	0.2	1.0	5.8
Nia Coffey	44	2	10.3	37.4%	29.3%	72.0%	2.6	1.0	0.2	0.4	0.7	3.9
Shatori Walker-Kimbrough	41	1	8.6	41.3%	35.5%	72.7%	0.9	0.5	0.2	0.3	0.4	1.7
Taylor Thierry	17	0	2.1	18.2%	33.3%	25.0%	0.4	0.1	0.2	—	0.1	0.4
Sika Koné	8	0	1.4	0.0%	0.0%	100.0%	0.1	0.1	—	—	—	0.5
Kamiah Smalls	3	0	1.0	—	—	—	—	—	—	—	—	—

=== Playoffs ===
Player	GP	GS	MPG	FG%	3P%	FT%	RPG	APG	SPG	BPG	TO	PPG
Rhyne Howard	3	3	35.0	36.4%	27.3%	72.7%	3.7	2.7	1.7	0.3	2.3	15.3
Naz Hillmon	3	3	34.0	46.2%	30.8%	71.4%	8.7	2.3	0.3	1.0	1.7	11.0
Allisha Gray	3	3	33.0	38.3%	25.0%	90.0%	8.3	2.3	1.0	0.7	1.3	16.0
Brionna Jones	3	3	28.3	66.7%	50.0%	75.0%	4.7	2.7	2.0	0.3	2.0	10.7
Jordin Canada	3	3	27.0	37.9%	0.0%	28.6%	2.3	6.7	1.0	0.3	1.7	8.0
Maya Caldwell	3	0	13.3	42.9%	33.3%	—	2.0	0.7	0.3	0.3	1.3	2.3
Brittney Griner	3	0	10.7	40.0%	—	66.7%	1.0	1.3	—	0.3	0.7	4.7
Te-Hina Paopao	3	0	9.7	53.3%	37.5%	—	1.7	0.3	0.3	0.3	1.3	0.7
Nia Coffey	3	0	5.3	20.0%	0.0%	—	1.0	—	—	—	—	0.7
Shatori Walker-Kimbrough	2	0	3.0	—	—	—	0.5	0.5	1.0	0.5	—	—
Taylor Thierry	1	0	2.0	—	—	—	—	—	—	—	—	—
Sika Koné	2	0	1.5	0.0%	—	0.0%	0.5	—	—	—	1.0	—

== Awards and honors ==
Recipient	Award	Date awarded	Ref.
Allisha Gray	Eastern Conference Player of the Week	June 3	
Allisha Gray	Eastern Conference Player of the Week	June 17	
Allisha Gray	Eastern Conference Player of the Week	August 12	
Allisha Gray	Eastern Conference Player of the Month – May	June 4	
Allisha Gray	WNBA All-Star Starter	June 30	
Allisha Gray	Eastern Conference Player of the Month – June	July 3	
Allisha Gray	Eastern Conference Player of the Month – August	September 3	
Allisha Gray	AP All-WNBA First Team	September 12	
Allisha Gray	WNBA Most Valuable Player Top 5 Finalist	September 19	
Allisha Gray	All-WNBA First Team	October 10	
Naz Hillmon	AP Sixth Woman of the Year	September 12	
Naz Hillmon	WNBA Sixth Player of the Year	September 20	
Rhyne Howard	WNBA All-Star Reserve	July 7	
Rhyne Howard	Eastern Conference Player of the Week	September 2	
Rhyne Howard	Eastern Conference Player of the Week	September 12	
Rhyne Howard	WNBA All-Defensive Second Team	October 8	
Brionna Jones	WNBA All-Star Reserve (replacement player)	July 17	
Dan Padover	WNBA Basketball Executive of the Year	September 23	
