= Rhyne Howard =

American basketball player (born 2000)

- Howard with the Atlanta Dream in 2026

No. 10 – Atlanta Dream
- Position: Shooting guard
- League: WNBA

Personal information
- Born: April 29, 2000 (age 26) Chattanooga, Tennessee, U.S.
- Listed height: 6 ft 2 in (1.88 m)
- Listed weight: 175 lb (79 kg)

Career information
- High school: Bradley Central (Cleveland, Tennessee)
- College: Kentucky (2018–2022)
- WNBA draft: 2022: 1st round, 1st overall pick
- Drafted by: Atlanta Dream
- Playing career: 2022–present
- Coaching career: 2023–present

Career history

Playing
- 2022–present: Atlanta Dream
- 2022–2023: Beretta Famila Schio
- 2025–present: Vinyl

Coaching
- 2023–2025: Florida (assistant)

Career highlights
- WNBA Rookie of the Year (2022); All-WNBA Second Team (2026); WNBA All-Defensive First Team (2026); WNBA All-Defensive Second Team (2025); 4× WNBA All-Star (2022, 2023, 2025, 2026); WNBA All-Rookie Team (2022); WNBA steals leader (2026); Unrivaled Second-team all-Unrivaled (2025); Unanimous first-team All-American (2021); 3× First-team All-American – AP, USBWA (2020-2022); WBCA Coaches' All-American (2021, 2022); 2× SEC Player of the Year (2020, 2021); SEC Tournament MVP (2022); 4× First-team All-SEC (2019–2022); SEC All-Defensive Team (2020); USBWA National Freshman of the Year (2019); WBCA Freshman of the Year (2019); SEC Freshman of the Year (2019); SEC All-Freshman Team (2019); Class AAA Tennessee Miss Basketball (2018); FIBA AmeriCup MVP (2021); FIBA Americas Under-18 Championship MVP (2018)
- Stats at Basketball Reference
Medals
Women's basketball
Representing the United States
FIBA World Cup
| Gold medal – first place | 2026 Germany |
FIBA AmeriCup
| Gold medal – first place | 2021 Puerto Rico | Team |
FIBA Under-19 World Cup
| Gold medal – first place | 2019 Thailand | Team |
FIBA Americas Under-18 Championship
| Gold medal – first place | 2018 Mexico | Team |
Women's 3x3 basketball
Representing the United States
Olympic Games
| Bronze medal – third place | 2024 Paris | Team |

Rhyne Howard (/ˈraɪən/ RY-ən; born April 29, 2000) is an American professional basketball player for the Atlanta Dream of the Women's National Basketball Association (WNBA) and for the Vinyl of Unrivaled. She played college basketball for the Kentucky Wildcats. She graduated from Bradley Central High School in Cleveland, Tennessee, in 2018. She was drafted first overall by the Dream in the 2022 WNBA draft.

In her senior year of high school at Bradley Central, she was named 2018 Tennessee Gatorade Player of the Year and Tennessee Miss Basketball. Howard participated on the USA team in 2018 and 2019, leading them to a gold medal and was awarded MVP honors in 2018. She participated in the Jordan Brand Classic among the top rated recruits in the U.S. Following her freshman season at Kentucky, Howard was named USBWA National Freshman of the Year. In 2020 and 2021, she was named SEC Player of the Year.

== College career ==
Howard notched SEC player of the year in 2020 and 2021, her sophomore and junior years at UK. She also earned All-SEC defensive team and All-SEC first team honors in 2021. In her freshman year, she earned the honors of All-SEC first team and SEC freshman of the year. Entering the Wildcats' 2021 postseason, Howard is the only player in the nation averaging 19 points per game and 7.5 rebounds per game, while snatching 40 steals and 70 assists.

On January 9, 2020, Howard recorded 43 points during a road game visiting the Alabama Crimson Tide. This performance tied the record for most points scored in a single game for a Kentucky women's player. This record was first accomplished by Jennifer O'Neill in 2013.

On January 27, 2022, Howard scored her 2,000th point in her college career, becoming the third Wildcat to reach that benchmark.

== Professional career ==
=== WNBA ===
On April 11, 2022, Howard was drafted first overall by the Atlanta Dream in the 2022 WNBA draft. During her rookie year Rhyne started every game and averaged 16.8 points, 2.8 assists, and 1.6 steals. Howard was announced to her first All-star game in July. She went on to earn Rookie of the month honors every month from May to August. Howard would later be announced as the WNBA Rookie of the Year for 2022.

Howard became the fastest player in WNBA history to make 100 3-pointers in a season on August 10, 2026. She scored her 100th 3-pointer during the 31st game of the 2026 season.

=== Unrivaled ===
On July 16, 2024, it was announced that Howard would appear and play in the inaugural season of Unrivaled, a new women's 3-on-3 basketball league founded by Napheesa Collier and Breanna Stewart.

== Career statistics ==
Legend
| GP | Games played | GS | Games started | MPG | Minutes per game | RPG | Rebounds per game |
| APG | Assists per game | SPG | Steals per game | BPG | Blocks per game | PPG | Points per game |
| TO | Turnovers per game | FG% | Field-goal percentage | 3P% | 3-point field-goal percentage | FT% | Free-throw percentage |
| **Bold** | Career best | ° | League leader |

=== WNBA ===
==== Regular season ====
WNBA regular season statistics
| Year | Team | GP | GS | MPG | FG% | 3P% | FT% | RPG | APG | SPG | BPG | TO | PPG |
|---|---|---|---|---|---|---|---|---|---|---|---|---|---|
| 2022 | Atlanta | 34 | 34 | 31.4 | .361 | .343 | .792 | 4.5 | 2.8 | 1.6 | .8 | 1.6 | 16.2 |
| 2023 | Atlanta | 39 | 39 | 32.9 | .385 | .352 | .788 | **4.9** | 3.5 | 1.3 | .6 | 1.9 | 17.5 |
| 2024 | Atlanta | 30 | 29 | 33.9 | .371 | .329 | .784 | 4.4 | 3.2 | 1.8 | .6 | 1.7 | 17.3 |
| 2025 | Atlanta | 33 | 32 | **34.9** | .375 | .322 | .856 | 4.5 | **4.6** | 1.5 | .8 | 1.7 | 17.5 |
| 2026 | Atlanta | **43** | **43** | 34.2° | **.405** | **.355** | **.862** | 3.8 | 3.7 | **2.3** | **.9** | **1.3** | **17.7** |
| **Career** | 5 years, 1 team | 179 | 177 | 33.5 | .381 | .341 | .816 | 4.4 | 3.6 | 1.7 | .8 | 1.6 | 17.3 |
| **Career** | All-Star | 3 | 0 | 17.5 | .361 | .290 | 1.000 | 3.7 | 3.3 | 1.0 | .0 | .7 | 12.3 |

==== Playoffs ====
WNBA playoff statistics
| Year | Team | GP | GS | MPG | FG% | 3P% | FT% | RPG | APG | SPG | BPG | TO | PPG |
|---|---|---|---|---|---|---|---|---|---|---|---|---|---|
| 2023 | Atlanta | 2 | 2 | **37.5** | .431 | **.458** | .667 | 3.5 | 2.0 | 2.0° | .5 | 2.0 | **28.5**° |
| 2024 | Atlanta | 2 | 2 | 34.5 | **.448** | .231 | .500 | **5.5** | **3.5** | **2.5** | **2.5**° | **1.0** | 16.5 |
| 2025 | Atlanta | **3** | **3** | 35.0 | .364 | .273 | **.727** | 3.7 | 2.7 | 1.7 | .3 | 2.3 | 15.3 |
| **Career** | 3 years, 1 team | 7 | 7 | 35.6 | .411 | .339 | .636 | 4.1 | 2.7 | 2.0 | 1.0 | 1.9 | 19.4 |

=== College ===
NCAA statistics
| Year | Team | GP | GS | MPG | FG% | 3P% | FT% | RPG | APG | SPG | BPG | TO | PPG |
|---|---|---|---|---|---|---|---|---|---|---|---|---|---|
| 2018–19 | Kentucky | **32** | **31** | 30.9 | **.445** | **.387** | .676 | 5.1 | 2.3 | 2.1 | .7 | 2.4 | 16.4 |
| 2019–20 | Kentucky | 27 | 27 | 31.2 | .433 | .382 | .791 | 6.5 | 2.4 | 2.3 | 1.1 | 2.2 | **23.4** |
| 2020–21 | Kentucky | 24 | 24 | 34.8 | .444 | .373 | .779 | 7.3 | **3.8** | **2.5** | .8 | 2.1 | 20.7 |
| 2021–22 | Kentucky | 31 | **31** | **35.3** | .441 | .383 | **.808** | **7.4** | 3.3 | 2.3 | **1.3** | **1.8** | 20.5 |
| **Career** | | 114 | 113 | 33.0 | .440 | .382 | .772 | 6.9 | 2.9 | 2.3 | 1.0 | 2.2 | 20.1 |

== Coaching career ==
Howard was hired as an assistant coach and director of player personnel at Florida in 2023.

== Personal life ==
Howard is a member of Zeta Phi Beta sorority. She was initiated through the Iota Mu chapter at the University of Kentucky.
