= 2025 WNBA All-Star Game =

Exhibition basketball game

	1	2	3	4	Total
Team Collier	49	33	37	32	151
Team Clark	36	24	35	36	131
- Date: July 19, 2025
- Arena: Gainbridge Fieldhouse
- City: Indianapolis, Indiana, United States
- MVP: Napheesa Collier
- Attendance: 16,988
- Network: United States: ABC, ESPN+, Disney+ Canada: TSN5
- Announcers: Ryan Ruocco (play-by-play); Rebecca Lobo (analyst); Holly Rowe (reporter)

WNBA All-Star Game
< 2024	2026 >

The 2025 WNBA All-Star Game was an exhibition basketball game played on July 19, 2025, at the Gainbridge Fieldhouse in Indianapolis, Indiana, United States. The Indiana Fever hosted the game and related events for the first time in franchise history. Tickets for All-Star weekend events went on sale on April 29, 2025, and sold out within seven hours. The teams were named after Caitlin Clark and Napheesa Collier, as both were the leading vote getters in the All-Star fan voting.

On July 18, 2025, Natasha Cloud of New York Liberty won the Kia Skills challenge and her teammate Sabrina Ionescu of New York Liberty won the Starry Three Point challenge.

== Roster selection ==
On June 10, the WNBA announced that All-Star fan voting (sponsored by Ally) would open on June 12, 2025, and close on June 28. Fans were able to submit one ballot daily with a maximum of 10 active WNBA players ("up to four guards and six frontcourt players regardless of conference") selected per ballot. Current WNBA players and media also helped select the 2025 All-Stars by submitting a single ballot consisting of four guards and six frontcourt players.

The voting was weighted as follows:

Voting group	Vote weight
**Fans**	50%
**Current WNBA players**	25%
**Sports media panel**	25%

=== Fan Vote results ===
The following are the top players based on total fan voting:

Rank (Note: The two players who received the most fan votes were named the 2025 All-Star captains.)	Player	Number of Votes
1	Caitlin Clark	1,293,526
2	Napheesa Collier	1,176,020
3	Aliyah Boston	1,174,669
4	A’ja Wilson	986,662
5	Breanna Stewart	972,434
6	Paige Bueckers	805,471
7	Kelsey Mitchell	753,368
8	Lexie Hull	653,968
9	Sabrina Ionescu	583,428
10	Angel Reese	506,741

=== Full voting results ===
Once voting has closed and votes tallied, players will be sorted into two categories (guards and frontcourt players) and ranked within the three voting groups listed above. The average of a player's weighted rank will determine their score. Then the four guards and six frontcourt players with the highest scores will be named the 2025 All-Star starters. Fan votes will serve as the tiebreaker, if needed.

**Bold**	Denotes player named as 2025 All-Star starter
°	Denotes player selected to All-Star reserve pool after head coach voting
*	Denotes player selected as injury replacement player

The following tables show the overall scores for the Top 10 guards and frontcourt players – based on the results from all three voting groups:

Guards
Rank	Player	Team	Fan Rank	Media Rank	Player Rank	Weighted Score
**1**	**Paige Bueckers**	**Dallas Wings**	2	5	4	3.25
**2**	**Caitlin Clark**	**Indiana Fever**	**1**	3	9	3.5 (Note: Fan votes served as the tiebreak.)
**3**	**Sabrina Ionescu**	**New York Liberty**	5	2	2	3.5
**4**	**Allisha Gray**	**Atlanta Dream**	7	**1**	**1**	4
5	Kelsey Mitchell °	Indiana Fever	3	11	6	5.75
6	Skylar Diggins °	Seattle Storm	9	4	3	6.25
7	Kelsey Plum °	Los Angeles Sparks	6	6	16	8.5
8	Brittney Sykes *	Washington Mystics	12	6	7	9.25
9	Natasha Cloud	New York Liberty	14	8	4	10
10	Jackie Young °	Las Vegas Aces	10	9	12	10.25

Frontcourt
Rank	Player	Team	Fan Rank	Media Rank	Player Rank	Weighted Score
**1**	**Napheesa Collier**	**Minnesota Lynx**	**1**	2	2	1.5
**2**	**A'ja Wilson**	**Las Vegas Aces**	3	**1**	**1**	2
**3**	**Breanna Stewart**	**New York Liberty**	4	4	4	3.5
**4**	**Aliyah Boston**	**Indiana Fever**	2	9	9	4.75
**5**	**Nneka Ogwumike**	**Seattle Storm**	9	3	3	6.25
**6**	**Satou Sabally**	**Phoenix Mercury**	8	5	5	6.5
7	Angel Reese °	Chicago Sky	5	12	12	7.75 (Note: Fan votes served as the tiebreak.)
8	Kiki Iriafen °	Washington Mystics	6	8	8	7.75
9	Gabby Williams °	Seattle Storm	10	7	7	8.75
10	Alyssa Thomas °	Phoenix Mercury	13	7	6	9.75

=== Reserves selections ===
The twelve All-Star reserves were selected by the league's head coaches. Coaches voted for three guards, five frontcourt players and four players at either position regardless of conference.

Position	Player	Team
Guard	Sonia Citron	Washington Mystics
Guard	Skylar Diggins	Seattle Storm
Guard	Rhyne Howard	Atlanta Dream
Frontcourt	Kiki Iriafen	Washington Mystics
Guard	Kelsey Mitchell	Indiana Fever
Guard	Kelsey Plum	Los Angeles Sparks
Frontcourt	Angel Reese	Chicago Sky
Frontcourt	Alyssa Thomas	Phoenix Mercury
Frontcourt	Kayla Thornton	Golden State Valkyries
Guard	Courtney Williams	Minnesota Lynx
Guard	Gabby Williams	Seattle Storm
Guard	Jackie Young	Las Vegas Aces

=== Final rosters ===
The two starters who receive the most fan votes were named the 2025 All-Star captains and announced on Sunday, June 29 during "WNBA Countdown" on ESPN. The remaining eight All-Star starters were announced Monday, June 30; and the 12 reserve players, on Sunday, July 6. The captains will draft their All-Star teams from the eight remaining starters and then from the reserve pool. The results of the draft were broadcast on ESPN during WNBA Countdown on July 8, 2025, at 7 p.m. ET.

All participating players selected as 2025 All-Stars received a $2,575 bonus, and the player named All-Star Game MVP will earn an additional $5,150 bonus from the WNBA.

In the first round, captains Caitlin Clark and Napheesa Collier alternated picks from the starters, with Clark taking Indiana Fever teammate, Aliyah Boston, as the first pick. The second round, Collier went first, selecting her own teammate, Courtney Williams of the Minnesota Lynx. At the conclusion of the draft, the captains announced, that prior to taping, they had agreed to trade head coaches with Sandy Brondello going to Team Clark and Cheryl Reeve to Team Collier.

Clark and Collier had the option of trading like-for-like players before finalizing their teams. Clark proposed a trade to Collier: "I'm feeling good with Sandy and Sabrina on my team...if you wanna send Stewie over too, I'll take her," in exchange for Clark's starter, Satou Sabally. Collier countered the proposal with a trade of Stewart for Boston, which Clark quickly declined. Ultimately, no player trades occurred.

Note: players are listed within each respective team based on order of pick.

**Team Clark**
Pos	Player	Team	No. of selections
Starters
G	Caitlin Clark (**c**) ^{INJ3}	Indiana Fever	2
F	Aliyah Boston	Indiana Fever	3
G	Sabrina Ionescu	New York Liberty	4
F	A'ja Wilson	Las Vegas Aces	7
F	Satou Sabally ^{INJ2}	Phoenix Mercury	3
Reserves
G	Kelsey Mitchell ^{ST1}	Indiana Fever	3
G	Gabby Williams	Seattle Storm	1
G	Sonia Citron	Washington Mystics	1
F	Kiki Iriafen	Washington Mystics	1
G	Jackie Young ^{ST2}	Las Vegas Aces	4
F	Kayla Thornton	Golden State Valkyries	1
F	Brionna Jones ^{REP2}	Atlanta Dream	4
G	Brittney Sykes ^{REP3}	Washington Mystics	1
Head coach: Sandy Brondello (New York Liberty)

**Team Collier**
Pos	Player	Team	No. of selections
Starters
F	Napheesa Collier (**c**)	Minnesota Lynx	5
F	Breanna Stewart	New York Liberty	7
G	Allisha Gray	Atlanta Dream	3
F	Nneka Ogwumike	Seattle Storm	10
G	Paige Bueckers	Dallas Wings	1
Reserves
G	Courtney Williams	Minnesota Lynx	2
G	Skylar Diggins	Seattle Storm	7
F	Angel Reese	Chicago Sky	2
F	Alyssa Thomas	Phoenix Mercury	6
G	Kelsey Plum	Los Angeles Sparks	4
G	Rhyne Howard ^{INJ1}	Atlanta Dream	3
G	Kayla McBride ^{REP1}	Minnesota Lynx	5
Head coach: Cheryl Reeve (Minnesota Lynx)

Notes

- **^INJ1** Howard was injured (left leg) during the Dream's July 11 game against Indiana and is projected to miss play for the rest of July 2025
- **^REP1** McBride was selected as a replacement player for Howard on July 15, 2025
- **^INJ2** On July 16, Sabally announced she would be unable to play in the All-Star game due to her lingering ankle injury.
- **^REP2** Jones was selected as a replacement player for Sabally on July 17, 2025.
- **^INJ3** On July 17, Clark announced that she would be unable to play in the All-Star game due to a groin injury.
- **^REP3** Sykes was selected as a replacement player for Clark on July 17, 2025.
- **^ST1** On July 19, Mitchell was named as a starter by Coach Brondello (replacement for Clark).
- **^ST2** On July 19, Young was named as a starter by Coach Brondello (replacement for Sabally).

== Head coach selection ==
The two coaches with the best team record following games on Friday, July 4, were named the 2025 All-Star coaches (regardless of conference). The head coach with the best record will coach the team with the captain who received the most fan votes.

On July 3, Cheryl Reeve and Sandy Brondello were announced as head coaches of Team Clark and Team Collier, respectively. During the draft on July 8, the captains announced they had traded head coaches with Brondello going to Team Clark and Reeve to Team Collier.

== Game ==
ABC

July 19, 2025
8:30 p.m. ET

Team Clark 131, Team Collier 151
Scoring by quarter: 36–49, 24–33, 35–37, 36–32
Pts: Kelsey Mitchell (20); Rebs: Kayla Thornton (11); Asts: Ionescu, Sykes (7)	Pts: Napheesa Collier (36); Rebs: Skylar Diggins (11); Asts: Skylar Diggins (15)

Gainbridge Fieldhouse, Indianapolis, Indiana
Attendance: 16,988
Referees: Tiara Cruse, Angel Kent, Jenna Reneau

=== Special rules ===
For the 2025 All-Star Game, the 4-point shot (sponsored by AT&T) will return. Four spots will be placed above the three-point line at a distance of 28 feet (two per half-court). Any shot made by a player who has contact within these spots will register 4 points for their team. Paige Bueckers made the first four-point shot of the game, 28 seconds into the game. The ESPN software used to capture the play–by–play and box score did not have the facility to identify four point shots, so they were recorded as three points shots followed by a free throw. The play–by–play entries are:

9:32		Paige Bueckers makes 29-foot three point jumper (Breanna Stewart assists)	3	0

9:32		Paige Bueckers makes free throw 1 of 1						4	0

and the box score gives her credit for a three-point basket and a foul shot.

The shot clock will be shortened from 24 to 20 seconds with an 8-second backcourt rule.

Teams will be able to use "hockey-like player substitutions" when they are in possession of the ball in the backcourt. Players must enter and exit in the backcourt and the substitute is not permitted to touch the ball in the backcourt upon entering the game. One substitution will be permitted per possession.

There will be no free throws given to players until the final two minutes of the All-Star game. Rather, players who are fouled (and would shoot free throws in a typical game) will automatically be credited with the number of maximum available points based on calls made by referees.

== Total All-Star selections per team ==
Number of All-Star players per team
Team	Number of players
Atlanta Dream	3^{*}
Chicago Sky	1
Connecticut Sun	0
Golden State Valkyries	1
Indiana Fever	3
New York Liberty	2
Washington Mystics	3^{*}
Dallas Wings	1
Las Vegas Aces	2
Los Angeles Sparks	1
Minnesota Lynx	3^{*}
Phoenix Mercury	2
Seattle Storm	3

* Including replacement players

=== 2025 selections per conference ===
Eastern Conference All-Stars
Pos	Player	Team	No. of selections
Starters
G	Caitlin Clark ^{INJ3}	Indiana Fever	2
F	Aliyah Boston	Indiana Fever	3
G	Allisha Gray	Atlanta Dream	3
G	Sabrina Ionescu	New York Liberty	4
F	Breanna Stewart	New York Liberty	7
Reserves
G	Sonia Citron	Washington Mystics	1
G	Rhyne Howard ^{INJ1}	Atlanta Dream	3
F	Kiki Iriafen	Washington Mystics	1
F	Brionna Jones ^{REP2}	Atlanta Dream	4
G	Kelsey Mitchell	Indiana Fever	3
F	Angel Reese	Chicago Sky	2
G	Brittney Sykes ^{REP3}	Washington Mystics	1

Western Conference All-Stars
Pos	Player	Team	No. of selections
Starters
F	Napheesa Collier	Minnesota Lynx	5
G	Paige Bueckers	Dallas Wings	1
F	Nneka Ogwumike	Seattle Storm	10
F	Satou Sabally ^{INJ2}	Phoenix Mercury	3
F	A'ja Wilson	Las Vegas Aces	7
Reserves
G	Skylar Diggins	Seattle Storm	7
G	Kayla McBride ^{REP1}	Minnesota Lynx	5
G	Kelsey Plum	Los Angeles Sparks	4
F	Alyssa Thomas	Phoenix Mercury	6
F	Kayla Thornton	Golden State Valkyries	1
G	Courtney Williams	Minnesota Lynx	2
G	Gabby Williams	Seattle Storm	1
G	Jackie Young	Las Vegas Aces	4

== All-Star Weekend ==
In August 2024, it was announced that there will be a Three-Point Contest and Skills Challenge on Friday, July 18, the night before the All-Star game. The Three-Point Contest will be sponsored by Starry, and the Skills Challenge by Kia. These competitions were broadcast live on ESPN with a WNBA Countdown show preceding the broadcast.

Winners of the 3-point and skills competitions will receive a $2,575 bonus from the league. For the second year, Aflac partnered with the Women's National Basketball Players Association (WNBPA) to provide the winners of the Three-Point Contest and Skills Challenge with additional prize money, $60,000 and $55,000, respectively.

=== Three-Point Contest ===
The contestants for the three-point contest were announced on July 16, 2025. Caitlin Clark of the Indiana Fever was one of the original contestants named for the 2025 Three-Point Contest. But on July 17, she announced that she would be unable to participate due to a groin injury. On July 18, it was announced that Clark's teammate Lexie Hull would replace her in the Three-Point Contest.

In the press conference after claiming her second three-point contest title, Sabrina Ionescu said that prior to the competition she had promised rookie, Sonia Citron, half of her prize money if she won and that she would be keeping that promise. Ionescu stated the other half of her winnings would go to her SI20 Foundation.

Player	Position	Team	2025 Mid-season 3-point statistics			1st round	Final round
Player	Position	Team	Made	Attempted	Percent	1st round	Final round
Sabrina Ionescu	Guard	New York Liberty	50	161	31.1%	25	30
Allisha Gray	Guard	Atlanta Dream	51	134	38.1%	25	22
Kelsey Plum	Guard	Los Angeles Sparks	53	148	35.8%	22	DNQ
Lexie Hull	Guard	Indiana Fever	29	62	46.8%	20	DNQ
Sonia Citron	Guard	Washington Mystics	35	96	36.5%	19	DNQ

=== Skills Challenge ===
The contestants for the skills challenge were announced on July 16, 2025.

Player	Position	Team	1st round	Final round
Natasha Cloud	Guard	New York Liberty	34.1 s	36.4 s
Erica Wheeler	Guard	Seattle Storm	36.5 s	37.5 s
Allisha Gray	Guard	Atlanta Dream	39.4 s	DNQ
Courtney Williams	Guard	Minnesota Lynx	42.0 s	DNQ
Skylar Diggins	Guard	Seattle Storm	44.3 s	DNQ
