= Kiki Iriafen =

Nigerian-American basketball player (born 2003)

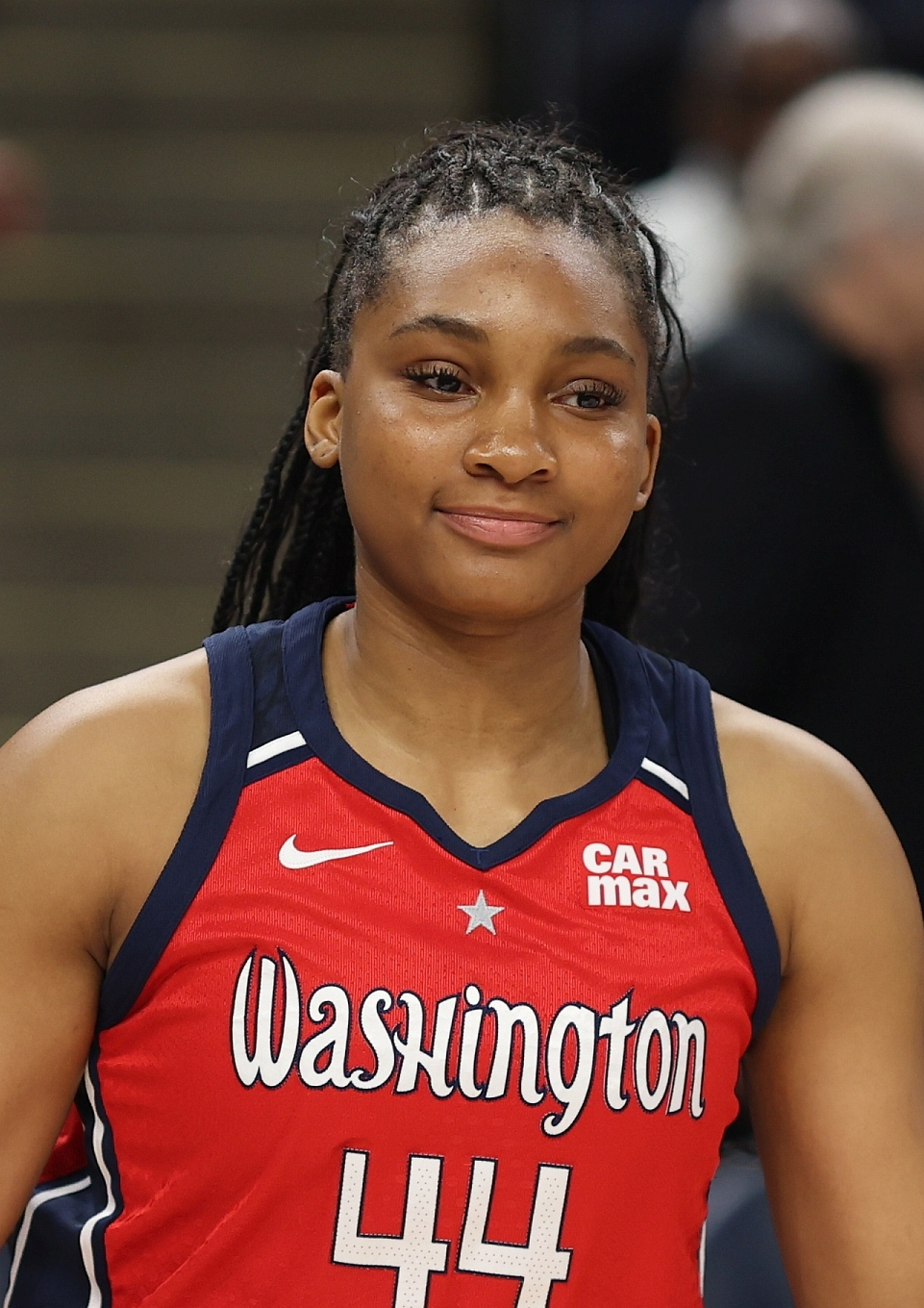
- Iriafen with the Washington Mystics in 2025

No. 44 – Washington Mystics
- Position: Power forward
- League: WNBA

Personal information
- Born: August 26, 2003 (age 23) Los Angeles, California, U.S.
- Listed height: 6 ft 3 in (1.91 m)
- Listed weight: 202 lb (92 kg)

Career information
- High school: Harvard-Westlake School (Los Angeles, California)
- College: Stanford (2021–2024); USC (2024–2025)
- WNBA draft: 2025: 1st round, 4th overall pick
- Drafted by: Washington Mystics
- Playing career: 2025–present

Career history
- 2025–present: Washington Mystics
- 2026–present: Phantom BC

Career highlights
- 2× WNBA All-Star (2025, 2026); WNBA All-Rookie Team (2025); All-American – WBCA (2025); Third-team All-American – AP, USBWA (2025); First-team All-Big Ten (2025); Katrina McClain Award (2024); Pac-12 Most Improved Player of the Year (2024); All-Pac-12 Team (2024); Pac-12 All-Freshman Team – Media (2022); Academic All-American of the Year (2025); McDonald's All-American (2021)
- Stats at Basketball Reference

Okikiola "Kiki" Iriafen (born August 26, 2003) is an American professional basketball player for the Washington Mystics of the Women's National Basketball Association (WNBA) and for Phantom of Unrivaled. She played college basketball at Stanford and USC. Iriafen was selected fourth overall by the Mystics in the 2025 WNBA draft and was named an All-Star in her rookie season.

== High school career ==
Iriafen grew up in Los Angeles in a Nigerian-American family. She played basketball for Harvard-Westlake School. She was a two-time Los Angeles Daily News Player of the Year and was named a McDonald's All-American as a senior. In her junior season, Iriafen led her team to the CIF Southern Section Division 1 title and earned Division 1 Player of the Year honors. She left as her school's all-time leader in points and rebounds. Rated a five-star recruit by ESPN, Iriafen committed to playing college basketball for Stanford over offers from Baylor, UCLA, UConn and Notre Dame.

== College career ==
As a freshman at Stanford, Iriafen came off the bench, averaging 4.2 points and 2.2 rebounds per game en route to Pac-12 All-Freshman honors from league media. In her sophomore season, she averaged 6.7 points and 3.8 rebounds per game. Iriafen became one of Stanford's top players as a junior.

After a breakout junior season in which she averaged 19.4 points and 11.0 rebounds and was named the most improved player in the Pac-12, Iriafen entered the NCAA transfer portal and eventually transferred to USC, returning to her hometown of Los Angeles for her final college season.

== Professional career ==
=== WNBA ===
==== Washington Mystics (2025–present) ====
On April 14, 2025, Iriafen was selected fourth overall by the Washington Mystics in the 2025 WNBA draft. She was named Rookie of the Month for May after averaging 13.9 points, 10.1 rebounds, and 1.0 assists per game while shooting 47.4% from the field.

On September 4, 2025 she scored 18 points and got 13 rebounds, breaking the franchise record for most double-doubles in a season with 16. The previous record of 15 was set by Crystal Langhorne in 2010.

=== Unrivaled ===
On November 5th, 2025, it was announced that Iriafen had been drafted by Phantom BC for the 2026 Unrivaled season.

== National team career ==
Iriafen made her debut United States senior team start on March 12, 2026, recording 10 points and five rebounds in a 91–48 win over Puerto Rico in the FIBA World Cup qualification tournament in San Juan, Puerto Rico.

== Career statistics ==
Legend
GP	Games played	GS	Games started	MPG	Minutes per game	RPG	Rebounds per game
APG	Assists per game	SPG	Steals per game	BPG	Blocks per game	PPG	Points per game
TO	Turnovers per game	FG%	Field-goal percentage	3P%	3-point field-goal percentage	FT%	Free-throw percentage
**Bold**	Career best	°	League leader

=== WNBA ===
Stats current through end of 2025 season

WNBA regular season statistics
Year	Team	GP	GS	MPG	FG%	3P%	FT%	RPG	APG	SPG	BPG	TO	PPG
2025	Washington	44°	44°	26.9	.488	.182	.784	8.5	1.6	0.6	0.2	2.2	13.3
**Career**	1 year, 1 team	44	44	26.9	.488	.182	.784	8.5	1.6	0.6	0.2	2.2	13.3
**Career**	All-Star	1	0	22.9	.467	.286	1.000	10.0	1.0	2.0	0.0	2.0	17.0

=== College ===
Year	Team	GP	GS	MPG	FG%	3P%	FT%	RPG	APG	SPG	BPG	TO	PPG
2021–22	Stanford	33	0	6.5	**57.1**	0.0	56.8	2.2	0.4	0.2	0.3	**0.4**	4.2
2022–23	Stanford	35	27	12.1	53.1	0.0	64.9	3.8	0.5	0.2	0.3	1.3	6.7
2023–24	Stanford	**36**	**36**	27.8	54.6	**33.3**	77.3	**11.0**	**2.3**	0.6	**0.6**	2.3	**19.4**
2024–25	USC	35	35	**30.3**	49.0	28.6	**81.1**	8.4	1.8	**0.9**	**0.6**	2.4	18.0
Career		139	98	19.4	52.5	28.6	74.7	6.4	1.3	0.5	0.5	1.6	12.2

== Off the court ==
=== In popular culture ===
In March 2025, ESPN+ announced a second season of their docuseries, Full Court Press would premiere in May 2025. The series (from Peyton Manning's Omaha Productions and Words & Pictures) followed Iriafen, Notre Dame's Hannah Hidalgo, and Louisiana State's Flau'jae Johnson throughout their 2024–25 NCAA basketball season and postseason.
