= 2025 Indiana Fever season =

- Head coach: Stephanie White
- Arena: Gainbridge Fieldhouse

Results
- Record: 24–20 (.545)
- Place: 3rd (Eastern)
- Playoff finish: 6th seed Lost in Semifinals 2–3 to Las Vegas Aces

The 2025 Indiana Fever season was the franchise's 26th season in the WNBA and their third season under head coach, Stephanie White, who returned to the franchise where she previously coached the Fever from 2015 to 2016.

The Fever finished 6th in the 2024 regular season, making the playoffs for the first time since 2016. On October 27, 2024, the Fever announced the firing of head coach Christie Sides, after the end of the 2024 season. Then on November 1, the Fever announced White as their new head coach. During the 2025 regular season, White missed two games in June due to personal reasons during which assistant coach, Austin Kelly, served as acting head coach.

The Fever set a WNBA record for highest resale ticket prices for a preseason game with an average ticket price of $440 (before fees) for their May 4 exhibition game against Brazil at Carver–Hawkeye Arena in Iowa City, Iowa. However, on game day, it was reported that resale ticket prices for this game was at an average ticket price of $670, making it the highest price on record for any WNBA game since 2015. The game was the third most viewed preseason basketball game on ESPN (in both NBA and WNBA history) since 2010 with 1.3 million viewers.

In May 2025 the Indiana Fever launched Fever Direct with Endeavor Streaming to provide access to a maximum of 18 live regular season games and full game replays to fans in approved Midwest regions.

On May 18, 2025, the WNBA announced they had opened an investigation regarding "allegations of inappropriate fan conduct" directed at Chicago Sky players occurring during the Fever's May 17 home opener versus the Sky. The Sky's head coach, Tyler Marsh, told the press that he and his team did not report or witness any misconduct while at Gainbridge Fieldhouse and only learned about the allegations after the game had concluded. Nine days later, the WNBA announced their investigation was complete, and all allegations of racist fan behavior were unsubstantiated.

During 2025 WNBA Commissioner's Cup game play, the Fever went 4–1 in their conference. Due to their head-to-head win over the New York Liberty on June 14, the Fever advanced to the final as the representative of the Eastern conference to face the Minnesota Lynx. The two teams met on July 1 at the Target Center, where the Fever claimed the mid-season trophy (and its $500,000 prize pot), winning the game 74–59 despite their starting point guard, Caitlin Clark, being out with a groin injury. At the conclusion of the tournament, the Fever had raised a total of $23,000 for Peace Learning Center in Indianapolis.

Despite having five players with season-ending injuries, the Fever clinched a playoff spot in the postseason for the second consecutive season on September 7.

== All-Star hosts ==
In August 2024, the WNBA announced that the Fever would host 2025 WNBA All-Star Game and related events in July 2025 for the first time in franchise history. Tickets for All-Star weekend events went on sale on April 29, 2025, and sold out within seven hours.

On June 29, Clark was named team captain for the 2025 All-Star Game for the first time in her career after receiving 1,293,526 votes, the most votes in WNBA history (breaking her own voting record from the 2024 season). The following day, Aliyah Boston was also named an All-Star starter, her third time earning All-Star honors in her WNBA career. The Fever had a total of eight players in the top 40 of total fan All-Star votes. No other team in the league had more than four players crack the top 40. On July 6, Kelsey Mitchell earned her third All-Star selection. During the All-Star draft on July 8, Clark selected both Boston and Mitchell as her first picks from the starter and reserve players, respectively.

== Draft ==
After trading away their 2025 first-round pick, the Fever entered the draft with two consecutive second-round picks as well as their own third-round pick.

Round	Pick	Player	Position	Nationality	College/Club	Outcome	Ref.
2	19	Makayla Timpson	F	United States	Florida State	Signed rookie contract April 23; Made opening day roster	
2	20	Bree Hall	G	United States	South Carolina	Signed rookie contract April 23; Waived on May 5	
3	33	Yvonne Ejim	F	Canada	Gonzaga	Signed rookie contract April 22; Waived on May 7	

== Transactions ==
=== Front office and coaching ===
On January 16, 2025, Pacers Sports & Entertainment announced that the Fever would have its own devoted practice facility walking distance from Gainbridge Fieldhouse by 2027. The $78 million exclusive sports performance center will be spread across 108,000 sq. ft., making it the largest practice facility among the existing WNBA teams.

Date	Details	Ref.
October 4, 2024	Hired Amber Cox as Chief Operating Officer and General Manager	
October 4, 2024	Lin Dunn named Senior Advisor	
October 27, 2024	Fired head coach, Christie Sides	
November 1, 2024	Hired Stephanie White as head coach	
November 27, 2024	Hired Austin Kelly as an assistant coach	
November 27, 2024	Karima Christmas-Kelly returning as an assistant coach	
December 11, 2024	Hired Keith Porter as player development coach	
January 27, 2025	Hired Jackie Maynard as Associate Vice President of Basketball Communications	
April 2, 2025	Hired Briann January as an assistant coach	

=== Trades ===
February
February 2 (Four-team trade)	To Indiana Fever Sophie Cunningham and the 2025 No. 19 pick (from Phoenix Mercury); Jaelyn Brown (from Dallas Wings)	To Connecticut Sun Rebecca Allen and Natasha Cloud (from Phoenix Mercury); Jacy Sheldon (from Dallas Wings); 2025 No. 8 draft pick (from Indiana Fever)
February 2 (Four-team trade)	To Dallas Wings DiJonai Carrington and Tyasha Harris (from Connecticut Sun); NaLyssa Smith and right to swap third-round picks in 2027 draft (from Indiana Fever); Rights to Mikiah Herbert Harrigan and the 2025 No. 12 pick (from Phoenix Mercury)	To Phoenix Mercury Alyssa Thomas (from Connecticut Sun); Satou Sabally, Kalani Brown, and Sevgi Uzun (from Dallas Wings)

=== Free agency ===
DeWanna Bonner began the 2025 season, starting the first three games; however, she came off the bench for the following six games (with Lexie Hull getting the starting nod). Since the Fever's June 13 game, Bonner was listed on injury reports as unavailable due to "personal reasons." On June 24, 2025, it was reported that Bonner "[had] no interest in returning to play for the Fever." The next day, the Fever announced that they had waived Bonner, who in her own words stated she "felt the fit did not work out" and she preferred to play for teams such as the Phoenix Mercury or the Atlanta Dream. Fever general manager, Amber Cox, spoke to the press on June 26 and stated that Bonner expressed her dissatisfaction "nine, ten games [into the season]" and that equal trade opportunities were sought but no suitable trade options were found which resulted in Bonner being waived.

==== Core designation ====
Player	Date	Notes	Ref.
Kelsey Mitchell	January 16	Accepted core offer on January 29	

==== Re-signed / extensions ====
Player	Date	Notes	Ref.
Aliyah Boston	April 18	Exercised team option (Fourth-year)	
Damiris Dantas	July 9	Set as active	

==== Additions ====
Player	Date	Notes	Former Team	Ref.
Natasha Howard	February 3	One-year deal	Dallas Wings	
DeWanna Bonner	February 5	One-year deal	Connecticut Sun	
Sydney Colson	February 6	One-year deal	Las Vegas Aces	
Brianna Turner	February 16	One-year deal	Chicago Sky	
Jillian Alleyne	March 24	Training camp contract	Tarsus Belediyesi Mersin	
Yvonne Ejim	April 22	Rookie contract (2025 draft pick – No. 33)	Gonzaga Bulldogs	
Bree Hall	April 23	Rookie contract (2025 draft pick – No. 20)	South Carolina Gamecocks	
Bree Hall	September 4	Rest of season contract	Free agent	
Makayla Timpson	April 23	Rookie contract (2025 draft pick – No. 19)	Florida State Seminoles	
Aari McDonald	June 1	Emergency hardship contract (Note: The Fever were permitted to sign player to this type of contract due to the team not having 10 game-eligible players at the time of McDonald's signing (Clark, Colson, and Cunningham were out with leg injuries).)	Los Angeles Sparks	
Aari McDonald	June 25	Rest of season contract	Los Angeles Sparks	
Chloe Bibby	July 25	7-day contract	Golden State Valkyries	
Chloe Bibby	August 1	Rest of season contract	Golden State Valkyries	
Odyssey Sims	August 10	7-day hardship contract (Note: The Fever were permitted to sign player to this type of contract due to the injuries of Colson and McDonald.)	Free agent	
Odyssey Sims	August 17	7-day hardship contract	Free agent	
Odyssey Sims	August 24	7-day hardship contract	Free agent	
Odyssey Sims	August 31	Rest of season contract (Note: This contract was signed under the W's hardship waiver.)	Free agent	
Kyra Lambert	August 14	7-day contract	Free agent	
Shey Peddy	August 19	7-day hardship contract	Free agent	
Shey Peddy	August 26	7-day hardship contract	Free agent	
Shey Peddy	September 2	7-day hardship contract	Free agent	
Shey Peddy	September 9	Rest of season contract	Free agent	
Aerial Powers	August 23	7-day hardship contract	Free agent	
Aerial Powers	August 30	7-day hardship contract	Free agent	
Aerial Powers	September 6	Rest of season contract	Free agent	

=== Departures ===
In 2024, the WNBA held its first expansion draft since 2008. The league's new expansion team, the Golden State Valkyries, selected Temi Fágbénlé from the Fever roster during the draft.

Player	Date	Reason	New Team	Ref.
Temi Fágbénlé	December 6	Expansion draft	Golden State Valkyries	
Grace Berger	February 2	Waived	Dallas Wings	
Victaria Saxton	February 3	Waived	—	
Katie Lou Samuelson (Note: Samuelson was waived and signed a mutual contract termination agreement with the Fever.)	February 10	Waived – contract amendment	Seattle Storm	
Erica Wheeler	February 12	Free agency – unrestricted	Seattle Storm	
Kristy Wallace	February 25	Suspended contract – full season	N/A – retained rights	
Jillian Alleyne	May 5	Waived	—	
Bree Hall	May 5	Waived	Golden State Valkyries	
Yvonne Ejim	May 7	Waived	—	
Jaelyn Brown	May 13	Waived	Connecticut Sun	
Aari McDonald (Note: The Fever were obligated to release McDonald due to the return of Caitlin Clark and Sophie Cunningham from injuries. Their returns resulted in the team no longer meeting the WNBA's emergency hardship exception requirements to keep McDonald on their roster.)	June 13	Released	—	
DeWanna Bonner	June 25	Waived	Phoenix Mercury	
Damiris Dantas	June 25	Suspended contract – temporary	N/A – retained rights	
Kyra Lambert	August 18	Released	—	

== Roster ==
2025 Indiana Fever roster
Players
Coaches

Pos.	No.	Nat.	Name	Height	Weight	DOB	From	Yrs
F	55	(Australia)	Bibby, Chloe (injured)	6' 2" (1.88m)	194 lb (88kg)	1998-06-15	Maryland	R
F/C	7	(United States)	Boston, Aliyah	6' 5" (1.96m)	220 lb (100kg)	2001-12-11	South Carolina	2
G	22	(United States)	Clark, Caitlin (injured)	6' 0" (1.83m)	157 lb (71kg)	2002-01-22	Iowa	1
G	51	(United States)	Colson, Sydney (injured)	5' 8" (1.73m)	137 lb (62kg)	1989-08-06	Texas A&M	10
G/F	8	(United States)	Cunningham, Sophie (injured)	6' 1" (1.85m)	165 lb (75kg)	1996-08-16	Missouri	6
F/C	12	(Brazil)	Dantas, Damiris (injured)	6' 4" (1.93m)	214 lb (97kg)	1992-11-17	Brazil	9
G	3	(United States)	Hall, Bree	6' 0" (1.83m)		2003-06-28	South Carolina	R
F	6	(United States)	Howard, Natasha	6' 3" (1.91m)	172 lb (78kg)	1991-09-02	Florida State	11
G	10	(United States)	Hull, Lexie	6' 1" (1.85m)	155 lb (70kg)	1999-09-13	Stanford	3
G	2	(United States)	McDonald, Aari (injured)	5' 6" (1.68m)	141 lb (64kg)	1998-08-20	Arizona	4
G	0	(United States)	Mitchell, Kelsey	5' 8" (1.73m)	155 lb (70kg)	1995-11-12	Ohio State	7
G	5	(United States)	Peddy, Shey	5' 7" (1.7m)		1988-10-28	Temple	5
G/F	23	(United States)	Powers, Aerial	5' 11" (1.8m)	170 lb (77kg)	1994-01-17	Michigan State	9
G	1	(United States)	Sims, Odyssey	5' 8" (1.73m)	155 lb (70kg)	1992-07-13	Baylor	11
F	21	(United States)	Timpson, Makayla	6' 2" (1.88m)	173 lb (78kg)	2002-09-20	Florida State	R
F/C	11	(United States)	Turner, Brianna	6' 3" (1.91m)	175 lb (79kg)	1996-07-05	Notre Dame	6
G	–	(Australia)	Wallace, Kristy (S)	5' 11" (1.8m)	157 lb (71kg)	1996-01-03	Baylor	3

Head coach
(United States) Stephanie White (Purdue)
Assistant coaches
(United States) Briann January (Arizona State)
(United States) Karima Christmas-Kelly (Duke)
(United States) Austin Kelly (Duke)
Player development
(United States) Keith Porter (Connecticut Avery Point)
Athletic trainer
(United States) Todd Champlin (Daemen)
Assistant trainer
(United States) Alexis Gholston (Sacramento State)
Strength and conditioning coach
(United States) Sarah Kessler (Queensland)

Legend

- (C) Team captain
- (DP) Unsigned draft pick
- (FA) Free agent
- (S) Suspended
- Injured

=== Depth ===
Pos.	Starter	Bench
PG	Caitlin Clark	Sydney Colson; Aari McDonald; Shey Peddy; Odyssey Sims
SG	Kelsey Mitchell
SF	Sophie Cunningham	Bree Hall; Lexie Hull; Aerial Powers
PF	Natasha Howard	Chloe Bibby; Brianna Turner; Makayla Timpson
C	Aliyah Boston	Damiris Dantas

=== Injuries ===
On May 26, 2025, the Fever announced that Caitlin Clark had suffered a left quadriceps strain and would be out for a minimum of two weeks. During her June 5 status update press conference, Clark revealed her injury occurred during the Fever's May 24 game against the New York Liberty. In the May 30 match-up against Connecticut, two more Fever guards, Sydney Colson and Sophie Cunningham, both left the game with upper left leg and right ankle injuries, respectively. To keep a roster with 10 game-eligible players, the Fever signed guard, Aari McDonald, on June 1 to an emergency hardship contract. Due to Clark and Cunningham's likely return for the June 14 game hosting the Liberty, McDonald was waived by the Fever on June 13. Clark and Cunningham returned to play on June 14 in the Fever's home win over the New York Liberty, handing the reigning champs their first loss of the 2025 season.

On June 26, 2025, the Fever announced Clark would miss that day's home game against the Los Angeles Sparks due to a left groin injury. Fever head coach, Stephanie White, stated to the press that Clark and her ability to return to play likely would be assessed on "day-to-day" basis. During practice media availability on July 8, White and Clark both stated their expectation for Clark to be off the Fever's injury report and available for their game on July 9. She did return to play for the next four games (leading the Fever to a 3–1 stretch) before she suffered a right groin injury in the final minutes of their July 15 game against the Connecticut Sun. Clark missed her tenth game of the season, a back-to-back at New York, prior to the All-Star weekend. On July 17, Clark announced via the Fever's social media that she would not be participating in the 2025 three-point contest or playing All-Star game due to her injury and "need to rest [her] body." On July 24, the Fever announced that Clark underwent further medical evaluations in which "no additional injuries or damage were discovered"; however, no was timeline provided for Clark's return in the press release. On July 25, the Fever signed forward, Chloe Bibby to a 7-day contract. Clark announced on September 4 via her personal social media accounts that she would not return to play for the 2025 season.

During the Fever's August 7 game at Phoenix (hours after the final trade deadline of the season), Sydney Colson was helped to the locker room in the first quarter after a non-contact injury to her left leg, and Aari McDonald exited the fourth with a right foot injury. The following day, the Fever announced both Colson and McDonald had sustained season-ending injuries, Colson with a left ACL tear and McDonald with a fracture in her right foot, leaving the Fever without any healthy point guards. On August 10, Odyssey Sims was signed to a 7-day hardship contract, and on August 14, rookie guard, Kyra Lambert, was signed to a 7-day contract. Lambert was released on August 18.

In the second quarter of the Fever's match-up at Connecticut on August 17, Sophie Cunningham left the game with a right knee injury after Sun guard, Bria Hartley, stumbled into the paint and fell into Cunningham's leg. On August 19, the Fever stated that Cunningham would be out for the remainder of the Fever's season due to her right knee injury and had signed Shey Peddy to a 7-day hardship contract. Cunningham confirmed reports of her tearing her right MCL, on her August 19 episode of her podcast, "Show Me Something."

Before the Fever's August 22 game, Chloe Bibby was listed as "out" on the injury report for the first time this season with a left knee injury. On August 23, Aerial Powers was signed to a 7-day hardship contract. Bibby would not return to play and was ruled out for remainder of the season on September 4. Coach White stated that same day to the press that Bibby's knee became swollen with their travel and they had, "not been able to get the swelling reduced...[and she was] definitely not going to be ready by the end of the season." On September 4, Bree Hall was signed to a rest of season contract.

== Schedule ==
=== Preseason ===
2025 pre-season game log
Total: 3–0 (Home: 2–0; Road: 1–0)
May: 3–0 (Home: 2–0; Road: 1–0)

Game	Date	Team	Score	High points	High rebounds	High assists	Location Attendance	Record
1	May 3	Washington	W 79–74 (OT)	Sophie Cunningham (21)	Tied (8)	Lexie Hull (4)	Gainbridge Fieldhouse; 12,461	1–0
2	May 4	Brazil	W 108–44	Kelsey Mitchell (17)	Aliyah Boston (7)	Tied (5)	Carver-Hawkeye Arena; 14,998	2–0
3	May 10	@ Atlanta	W 81–76	Lexie Hull (14)	Brianna Turner (8)	Caitlin Clark (7)	Gateway Center Arena; 3,265	3–0

2025 pre-season schedule

=== Regular season ===
2025 game log
Total: 24–20 (Home: 13–9; Road: 11–11)
May: 2–4 (Home: 1–3; Road: 1–1)

Game	Date	Team	Score	High points	High rebounds	High assists	Location Attendance	Record
1	May 17	Chicago	W 93–58	Caitlin Clark (20)	Aliyah Boston (13)	Caitlin Clark (10)	Gainbridge Fieldhouse; 17,274	1–0
2	May 20	Atlanta	L 90–91	Caitlin Clark (27)	Aliyah Boston (10)	Caitlin Clark (11)	Gainbridge Fieldhouse; 16,269	1–1
3	May 22	@ Atlanta	W 81–76	Natasha Howard (26)	DeWanna Bonner (8)	Caitlin Clark (6)	State Farm Arena; 17,044	2–1
4	May 24	New York	L 88–90	Aliyah Boston (27)	Aliyah Boston (13)	Caitlin Clark (10)	Gainbridge Fieldhouse; 17,274	2–2
5	May 28	@ Washington	L 77–83	DeWanna Bonner (21)	Aliyah Boston (7)	Boston, Mitchell (4)	CFG Bank Arena; 11,183	2–3
6	May 30	Connecticut	L 83–85	Aliyah Boston (17)	Natasha Howard (6)	Aliyah Boston (8)	Gainbridge Fieldhouse; 16,213	2–4

June : 6–4 (Home: 3–1; Road: 3–3)

Game	Date	Team	Score	High points	High rebounds	High assists	Location Attendance	Record
7 (Note: All games highlighted in light orange represent Commissioner's Cup games.)	June 3	Washington	W 85–76	Kelsey Mitchell (24)	Lexie Hull (6)	Aari McDonald (5)	Gainbridge Fieldhouse; 16,013	3–4
8 (Note: Assistant coach, Austin Kelly, served as head coach for this game as Stephanie White was not available due to personal reasons.)	June 7	@ Chicago	W 79–52	Kelsey Mitchell (17)	Lexie Hull (6)	Aliyah Boston (5)	United Center; 19,496	4–4
9	June 10	@ Atlanta	L 58–77	Natasha Howard (15)	Natasha Howard (10)	Aliyah Boston (5)	Gateway Center Arena; 3,265	4–5
10	June 14	New York	W 102–88	Caitlin Clark (32)	Aliyah Boston (11)	Caitlin Clark (9)	Gainbridge Fieldhouse; 17,274	5–5
11	June 17	Connecticut	W 88–71	Caitlin Clark (20)	Natasha Howard (12)	Caitlin Clark (6)	Gainbridge Fieldhouse; 16,284	6–5
12	June 19	@ Golden State	L 77–88	Aliyah Boston (17)	Aliyah Boston (12)	Caitlin Clark (9)	Chase Center; 18,064	6–6
13	June 22	@ Las Vegas	L 81–89	Aliyah Boston (26)	Aliyah Boston (10)	Caitlin Clark (10)	T-Mobile Arena; 18,547	6–7
14	June 24	@ Seattle	W 94–86	Aliyah Boston (31)	Lexie Hull (11)	Caitlin Clark (9)	Climate Pledge Arena; 18,343	7–7
15	June 26	Los Angeles	L 75–85	Kelsey Mitchell (20)	Aliyah Boston (10)	Colson, Mitchell (4)	Gainbridge Fieldhouse; 17,274	7–8
16	June 27	@ Dallas	W 94–86	Kelsey Mitchell (32)	Natasha Howard (13)	Kelsey Mitchell (7)	American Airlines Center; 20,409	8–8

July : 7–4 (Home: 5–2; Road: 2–2)

Game	Date	Team	Score	High points	High rebounds	High assists	Location Attendance	Record
Commissioner's; Cup Final	July 1	@ Minnesota	W 74–59	Natasha Howard (16)	Natasha Howard (12)	Aliyah Boston (6)	Target Center; 12,778	—
17	July 3	Las Vegas	W 81–54	Kelsey Mitchell (25)	Natasha Howard (10)	Aari McDonald (7)	Gainbridge Fieldhouse; 16,509	9–8
18	July 5	Los Angeles	L 87–89	Aliyah Boston (23)	Aliyah Boston (12)	Aari McDonald (8)	Gainbridge Fieldhouse; 17,274	9–9
19	July 9	Golden State	L 61–80	Kelsey Mitchell (12)	Lexie Hull (9)	Caitlin Clark (6)	Gainbridge Fieldhouse; 16,798	9–10
20	July 11	Atlanta	W 99–82	Kelsey Mitchell (25)	Sophie Cunningham (10)	Caitlin Clark (9)	Gainbridge Fieldhouse; 16,966	10–10
21	July 13	Dallas	W 102–83	Kelsey Mitchell (20)	Cunningham, McDonald (5)	Caitlin Clark (13)	Gainbridge Fieldhouse; 17,274	11–10
22	July 15	@ Connecticut	W 85–77	Kelsey Mitchell (20)	Natasha Howard (13)	Caitlin Clark (7)	TD Garden; 19,156	12–10
23	July 16	@ New York	L 77–98	Kelsey Mitchell (16)	Lexie Hull (7)	Aliyah Boston (6)	Barclays Center; 17,371	12–11
All-Star Game
24	July 22	@ New York	L 84–98	Kelsey Mitchell (29)	Aliyah Boston (12)	Boston, McDonald (6)	Barclays Center; 17,365	12–12
25	July 24	Las Vegas	W 80–70	Kelsey Mitchell (21)	Natasha Howard (13)	Colson, McDonald, Mitchell (4)	Gainbridge Fieldhouse; 16,166	13–12
26	July 27	@ Chicago	W 93–78	Kelsey Mitchell (35)	Aliyah Boston (11)	Boston, Mitchell (6)	United Center; 19,601	14–12
27	July 30	Phoenix	W 107–101	Aari McDonald (27)	Aliyah Boston (12)	Colson, McDonald (4)	Gainbridge Fieldhouse; 17,274	15–12

August : 6–7 (Home: 2–3; Road: 4–4)

Game	Date	Team	Score	High points	High rebounds	High assists	Location Attendance	Record
28	August 1	@ Dallas	W 88–78	Kelsey Mitchell (23)	Natasha Howard (16)	Aari McDonald (6)	American Airlines Center; 17,857	16–12
29	August 3	@ Seattle	W 78–74	Natasha Howard (21)	Aliyah Boston (12)	Aari McDonald (9)	Climate Pledge Arena; 16,819	17–12
30	August 5	@ Los Angeles	L 91–100	Kelsey Mitchell (34)	Aliyah Boston (9)	McDonald, Mitchell (6)	Crypto.com Arena; 16,035	17–13
31	August 7	@ Phoenix	L 60–95	Sophie Cunningham (18)	Aliyah Boston (9)	Kelsey Mitchell (4)	PHX Arena; 17,071	17–14
32	August 9	Chicago	W 90–72	Kelsey Mitchell (26)	Natasha Howard (10)	Kelsey Mitchell (8)	Gainbridge Fieldhouse; 17,274	18–14
33	August 12	Dallas	L 80–81	Kelsey Mitchell (24)	Natasha Howard (12)	Cunningham, Dantas, Hull (3)	Gainbridge Fieldhouse; 16,027	18–15
34	August 15	Washington	L 84–88	Aliyah Boston (20)	Aliyah Boston (9)	Kelsey Mitchell (9)	Gainbridge Fieldhouse; 16,006	18–16
35	August 17	@ Connecticut	W 99–93 (OT)	Kelsey Mitchell (38)	Aliyah Boston (13)	Odyssey Sims (7)	Mohegan Sun Arena; 8,910	19–16
36	August 22	Minnesota	L 90–95	Kelsey Mitchell (27)	Aliyah Boston (6)	Mitchell, Sims (5)	Gainbridge Fieldhouse; 15,121	19–17
37	August 24	@ Minnesota	L 84–97	Kelsey Mitchell (26)	Natasha Howard (8)	Aliyah Boston (5)	Target Center; 15,124	19–18
38	August 26	Seattle	W 95–75	Aliyah Boston (27)	Boston, Hull, Powers (9)	Howard, Sims (6)	Gainbridge Fieldhouse; 16,737	20–18
39	August 29	@ Los Angeles	W 76–75	Aliyah Boston (22)	Aliyah Boston (11)	Boston, Hull (4)	Crypto.com Arena; 15,419	21–18
40	August 31	@ Golden State	L 63–75	Aerial Powers (17)	Boston, Howard, Hull (6)	Odyssey Sims (5)	Chase Center; 18,064	21–19

September : 3–1 (Home: 2–0; Road: 1–1)

Game	Date	Team	Score	High points	High rebounds	High assists	Location Attendance	Record
41	September 2	@ Phoenix	L 79–85	Kelsey Mitchell (29)	Aliyah Boston (8)	Aliyah Boston (7)	PHX Arena; 13,132	21–20
42	September 5	Chicago	W 97–77	Kelsey Mitchell (20)	Natasha Howard (7)	Kelsey Mitchell (8)	Gainbridge Fieldhouse; 16,012	22–20
43	September 7	@ Washington	W 94–65	Natasha Howard (17)	Aliyah Boston (11)	Odyssey Sims (8)	CFG Bank Arena; 11,183	23–20
44	September 9	Minnesota	W 83–72	Kelsey Mitchell (18)	Aliyah Boston (8)	Lexie Hull (4)	Gainbridge Fieldhouse; 15,012	24–20

2025 season schedule

=== Playoffs ===
2025 playoff game log
First round vs. Atlanta Dream
Won Series: 2–1

Game	Date	Team	Score	High points	High rebounds	High assists	Location Attendance	Series
1	September 14	@ Atlanta	L 68–80	Kelsey Mitchell (27)	Aliyah Boston (12)	Aliyah Boston (5)	Gateway Center Arena; 3,800	0–1
2	September 16	Atlanta	W 77–60	Kelsey Mitchell (19)	Aerial Powers (7)	Mitchell, Sims (4)	Gainbridge Fieldhouse; 16,682	1–1
3	September 18	@ Atlanta	W 87–85	Kelsey Mitchell (24)	Aliyah Boston (12)	Odyssey Sims (8)	Gateway Center Arena; 3,800	2–1

Semifinals vs. Las Vegas Aces
Lost Series: 2–3

Game	Date	Team	Score	High points	High rebounds	High assists	Location Attendance	Series
1	September 21	@ Las Vegas	W 89–73	Kelsey Mitchell (34)	Boston, Howard (11)	Aliyah Boston (5)	Michelob Ultra Arena; 10,409	1–0
2	September 23	@ Las Vegas	L 68–90	Odyssey Sims (18)	Aliyah Boston (13)	Odyssey Sims (7)	Michelob Ultra Arena; 10,516	1–1
3	September 26	Las Vegas	L 72–84	Kelsey Mitchell (21)	Lexie Hull (10)	Boston, Hull (4)	Gainbridge Fieldhouse; 16,507	1–2
4	September 28	Las Vegas	W 90–83	Kelsey Mitchell (25)	Aliyah Boston (14)	Aliyah Boston (5)	Gainbridge Fieldhouse; 16,022	2–2
5	September 30	@ Las Vegas	L 98–107 (OT)	Odyssey Sims (27)	Aliyah Boston (16)	Odyssey Sims (6)	Michelob Ultra Arena; 10,529	2–3

2025 playoff schedule

== Standings ==
#	Team	W	L	PCT	GB	Conf.	Home	Road	Cup
1	yx – Minnesota Lynx	34	10	.773	–	20–4	20–2	14–8	5–1
2	x – Las Vegas Aces	30	14	.682	4	16–8	17–5	13–9	2–4
3	x – Atlanta Dream	30	14	.682	4	15–6	16–6	14–8	3–2
4	x – Phoenix Mercury	27	17	.614	7	13–11	15–7	12–10	4–2
5	x – New York Liberty	27	17	.614	7	15–5	17–5	10–12	4–1
6	cx – Indiana Fever	24	20	.545	10	13–8	13–9	11–11	4–1
7	x – Seattle Storm	23	21	.523	11	12–12	10–12	13–9	4–2
8	x – Golden State Valkyries	23	21	.523	11	9–15	14–8	9–13	3–3
9	e – Los Angeles Sparks	21	23	.477	13	10–14	9–13	12–10	2–4
10	e – Washington Mystics	16	28	.364	18	8–12	10–12	6–16	2–3
11	e – Connecticut Sun	11	33	.250	23	7–14	7–15	4–18	1–4
12	e – Chicago Sky	10	34	.227	24	4–17	6–16	4–18	1–4
13	e – Dallas Wings	10	34	.227	24	4–20	6–16	4–18	1–5

Notes

(#) – League Standing
c – Commissioner's Cup winners
y – Regular Season Champion
x – Clinched playoff berth
e – Eliminated from playoff contention
Source: Overall standings and Commissioner's Cup Standings

== Playoffs ==
First Round: Best-of-3
**1**	**Minnesota Lynx**	**2**
8	Golden State Valkyries	0
4	**Phoenix Mercury**	2
5	New York Liberty	1
2	**Las Vegas Aces**	**2**
7	Seattle Storm	1
3	Atlanta Dream	1
6	**Indiana Fever**	**2**

Semifinals: Best-of-5
1	Minnesota Lynx	1
4	**Phoenix Mercury**	**3**
2	**Las Vegas Aces**	**3**
6	Indiana Fever	2

Finals: Best-of-7
4	Phoenix Mercury	0
2	**Las Vegas Aces**	**4**

- **Bold** – Series winner
- Italic – Team with home-court-advantage

== Statistics ==
Legend
GP	Games played	GS	Games started	MPG	Minutes per game	RPG	Rebounds per game
APG	Assists per game	SPG	Steals per game	BPG	Blocks per game	PPG	Points per game
FG%	Field-goal percentage	3P%	3-point field-goal percentage	FT%	Free-throw percentage	TO	Turnovers per game
PF	Fouls per game		Team leader		League leader

=== Regular season ===
2025 Indiana Fever regular season statistics
Player	GP	GS	MPG	FG%	3P%	FT%	RPG	APG	SPG	BPG	TO	PF	PPG
Kelsey Mitchell	44	44	31.4	.456	.394	.784	1.8	3.4	0.9	0.2	1.8	2.0	20.2
Caitlin Clark	13	13	31.1	.367	.279	.820	5.0	8.8	1.6	0.5	5.1	2.7	16.5
Aliyah Boston	44	44	30.2	.538	.207	.762	8.2	3.7	1.2	0.9	1.8	3.1	15.0
Natasha Howard	44	44	24.1	.552	.182	.712	6.6	1.5	1.2	0.6	1.9	2.7	11.4
Odyssey Sims ^{≠}	12	10	26.4	.412	.300	.810	1.8	4.0	0.6	0.0	1.3	1.8	10.3
Aari McDonald ^{≠ ‡ ≠}	20	13	26.3	.429	.308	.784	2.4	4.7	1.3	0.2	2.3	2.5	9.8
Aerial Powers ^{≠}	8	0	20.0	.429	.368	.647	4.6	2.4	0.9	0.1	1.4	2.4	9.0
Sophie Cunningham	30	13	25.2	.469	.432	.875	3.5	1.2	1.0	0.1	1.1	2.2	8.6
Lexie Hull	44	30	27.0	.395	.367	.722	4.3	1.8	1.2	0.2	0.9	2.8	7.2
DeWanna Bonner ^{‡}	9	3	21.3	.345	.360	.895	3.8	1.6	1.1	0.1	1.0	1.4	7.1
Shey Peddy ^{≠}	9	0	14.1	.548	.500	.667	0.8	1.7	0.4	0.0	1.0	0.8	5.2
Damiris Dantas	38	0	11.6	.348	.263	.857	2.4	0.7	0.2	0.1	0.8	1.5	4.6
Chloe Bibby ^{≠}	9	0	9.8	.357	.391	.857	1.2	0.4	0.6	0.1	0.8	0.8	3.9
Makayla Timpson	31	0	7.1	.561	—	.667	1.8	0.0	0.4	0.3	0.3	0.8	2.6
Sydney Colson	30	6	13.5	.342	.277	.857	0.8	2.0	0.5	0.2	1.2	1.1	2.4
Brianna Turner	27	0	8.6	.406	.000	.500	1.9	0.6	0.1	0.3	0.3	0.9	1.1
Bree Hall ^{≠}	1	0	5.0	.000	—	—	1.0	0.0	0.0	0.0	0.0	1.0	0.0
Kyra Lambert ^{≠ ‡}	1	0	1.0	—	—	—	0.0	0.0	0.0	0.0	0.0	0.0	0.0

^{‡}Waived/Released during the season
^{†}Traded during the season
^{≠}Acquired during the season

=== Playoffs ===
2025 Indiana Fever playoffs statistics
Player	GP	GS	MPG	FG%	3P%	FT%	RPG	APG	SPG	BPG	TO	PF	PPG
Kelsey Mitchell	8	8	32.6	.428	.429	.867	1.5	3.0	1.0	0.3	2.3	2.3	22.3
Odyssey Sims	8	8	29.4	.414	.333	.857	2.3	4.4	1.4	0.0	2.6	1.6	14.1
Aliyah Boston	8	8	31.5	.441	.111	.680	11.4	4.1	0.5	0.4	1.9	3.5	12.5
Lexie Hull	8	8	33.5	.341	.295	.722	5.0	2.0	0.9	0.6	1.9	3.1	10.3
Natasha Howard	8	8	24.4	.484	.000	.813	6.3	2.0	0.6	0.1	2.1	2.6	9.4
Shey Peddy	8	0	16.3	.429	.353	1.000	1.5	1.0	0.6	0.1	0.9	1.3	5.3
Brianna Turner	8	0	17.9	.667	—	.750	3.5	0.6	0.9	0.5	0.9	1.5	2.4
Makayla Timpson	8	0	6.4	.667	—	.750	1.9	0.0	0.3	0.4	0.4	0.4	2.3
Aerial Powers	8	0	10.4	.227	.000	.545	1.5	0.3	0.4	0.1	0.6	1.5	2.0
Bree Hall	4	0	2.0	.667	.000	.500	0.8	0.0	0.0	0.0	0.0	0.3	1.5
Damiris Dantas	Did not play (concussion protocol)												
Chloe Bibby	Did not play (season-ending injury)												
Caitlin Clark	Did not play (season-ending injury)												
Sydney Colson	Did not play (season-ending injury)												
Sophie Cunningham	Did not play (season-ending injury)												
Aari McDonald	Did not play (season-ending injury)												

== Awards and honors ==
Recipient	Award	Date awarded	Ref.
Aliyah Boston	WNBA All-Star Starter	June 30	
Aliyah Boston	Eastern Conference Player of the Week	August 5	
Aliyah Boston	WNBA All-Defensive Second Team	October 8	
Aliyah Boston	All-WNBA Second Team	October 10	
Caitlin Clark	WNBA All-Star Captain and Starter	June 29	
Natasha Howard	Commissioner's Cup Finals MVP	July 1	
Kelsey Mitchell	Eastern Conference Player of the Week	June 10	
Kelsey Mitchell	Eastern Conference Player of the Week	August 19	
Kelsey Mitchell	WNBA All-Star Reserve	July 7	
Kelsey Mitchell	AP All-WNBA First Team	September 12	
Kelsey Mitchell	WNBA Most Valuable Player Top 5 Finalist	September 19	
Kelsey Mitchell	All-WNBA First Team	October 10	
