= 2025 WNBA Commissioner's Cup =

2025 WNBA Commissioner's Cup Game
Cup Final
Indiana Fever	Minnesota Lynx
(4–1)	(5–1)
74	59
Head coach: Stephanie White	Head coach: Cheryl Reeve
	1	2	3	4	Total
Indiana Fever	12	20	20	22	74
Minnesota Lynx	20	7	15	17	59
- Date: Regular Season: June 1-17, 2025; Championship: July 1, 2025
- Venue: Local WNBA Arenas (Regular Season); Target Center (Championship)
- MVP: Natasha Howard (IND)

United States TV coverage
- Network: Prime Video

The 2025 WNBA Commissioner's Cup (known for sponsorship reasons as the 2025 WNBA Commissioner's Cup presented by Coinbase) was the WNBA's fifth Commissioner's Cup in league history. The Cup featured a transition away from the eleven-game format to a five-game format in the Eastern Conference and six-game format in the Western Conference, with six teams in the Eastern Conference and seven in the Western Conference. The best team in cup play from each conference faced off in a championship game. The Cup was won by the Indiana Fever, the franchise's first Commissioner's Cup.

== Format ==
The team with the best record in cup games from each conference played in the championship game against each other, with the team having the best record hosting the game. This season, the cup shifted to a five-game per team format instead of the previous ten games per team. All games were played between June 1 and June 17, 2025.

== Funding to local non-profits ==
Each team selects a charity of their choice to represent, and support throughout the Commissioner's Cup series.

Team	Charity	Donation Total
Atlanta Dream	Center for Black Women's Wellness	$11,000
Chicago Sky	K.W.O.E. Foundation	$7,000
Connecticut Sun	ACLU of Connecticut Foundation	$7,000
Dallas Wings	Unity Unlimited, Inc.	$8,000
Golden State Valkyries	Communities United for Restorative Youth Justice	$12,000
Indiana Fever	Peace Learning Center	$23,000
Las Vegas Aces	Anti-Defamation League – Nevada (ADL Nevada)	$10,000
Los Angeles Sparks	Social Justice Partners LA	$10,000
Minnesota Lynx	ACLU of Minnesota	$21,000
New York Liberty	Girls For Gender Equity	$13,000
Phoenix Mercury	YWCA Metropolitan Phoenix	$14,000
Seattle Storm	Urban League of Metropolitan Seattle	$14,000
Washington Mystics	ACLU of D.C.	$9,000

== Standings ==
Eastern Conference

Pos	Team	Pld	W	L	PF	PA	PD	GB	Qualification	IND	NYL	ATL	WAS	CHI	CON
1	Indiana Fever	5	4	1	412	364	+48	—	Advance to Championship Game	—	102–88	58–77	85–76	79–52	88–71
2	New York Liberty	5	4	1	445	379	+66	—		88–102	—	86–81	86–78	85–66	100–52
3	Atlanta Dream	5	3	2	411	354	+57	1		77–58	81–86	—	89–56	88–70	76–84
4	Washington Mystics	5	2	3	393	399	−6	2		76–85	78–86	56–89	—	79–72	104–67
5	Chicago Sky	5	1	4	338	397	−59	3		52–79	66–85	70–88	72–79	—	78–66
6	Connecticut Sun	5	1	4	340	446	−106	3		71–88	52–100	84–76	67–104	66–78	—

Updated to match(es) played on June 17, 2025. Source: WNBA

Western Conference

Pos	Team	Pld	W	L	PF	PA	PD	GB	Qualification	MIN	SEA	PHX	GSV	LAS	LVA	DAL
1	Minnesota Lynx	6	5	1	516	439	+77	—	Advance to Championship Game	—	84–94	88–65	86–75	101–78	76–62	81–65
2	Seattle Storm	6	4	2	504	456	+48	1		94–84	—	89–77	70–76	98–67	70–75	83–77
3	Phoenix Mercury	6	4	2	482	484	−2	1		65–88	77–89	—	86–77	85–80	76–70	93–80
4	Golden State Valkyries	6	3	3	483	471	+12	2		75–86	76–70	77–86	—	89–81 (OT)	95–68	71–80
5	Los Angeles Sparks	6	2	4	496	541	−45	3		78–101	67–98	80–85	81–89 (OT)	—	97–89	93–79
6	Las Vegas Aces	6	2	4	452	498	−46	3		62–76	75–70	70–76	68–95	89–97	—	88–84
7	Dallas Wings	6	1	5	465	509	−44	4		65–81	77–83	80–93	80–71	79–93	84–88	—

Updated to match(es) played on June 17, 2025. Source: WNBA

== Championship game summary ==
Prime Video

July 1, 2025
8:00 p.m. ET

Report

Indiana Fever 74, Minnesota Lynx 59
Scoring by quarter: 12–20, 32–27, 52–42, 74–59
Pts: Natasha Howard (16); Rebs: Natasha Howard (12); Asts: Aliyah Boston (6)	Pts: Alanna Smith (15); Rebs: Napheesa Collier (9); Asts: Courtney Williams (4)

Target Center, Minneapolis,Minnesota
Attendance: 12,778
Referees:
Roy Gulbeyan
Tiara Cruse
Isaac Barnett

== Team rosters ==
=== Indiana Fever ===
2025 Indiana Fever roster
Players
Coaches

Pos.	No.	Nat.	Name	Height	Weight	DOB	From	Yrs
F/C	7	(United States)	Boston, Aliyah	6' 5" (1.96m)	220 lb (100kg)	2001-12-11	South Carolina	2
G	22	(United States)	Clark, Caitlin (injured)	6' 0" (1.83m)	157 lb (71kg)	2002-01-22	Iowa	1
G	51	(United States)	Colson, Sydney	5' 8" (1.73m)	137 lb (62kg)	1989-08-06	Texas A&M	10
G	8	(United States)	Cunningham, Sophie	6' 1" (1.85m)	165 lb (75kg)	1996-08-16	Missouri	6
F/C	12	(Brazil)	Dantas, Damiris (S)	6' 4" (1.93m)	214 lb (97kg)	1992-11-17	Brazil	9
F	6	(United States)	Howard, Natasha	6' 3" (1.91m)	172 lb (78kg)	1991-09-02	Florida State	11
G	10	(United States)	Hull, Lexie	6' 1" (1.85m)	155 lb (70kg)	1999-09-13	Stanford	3
G	15	(United States)	McDonald, Aari	5' 6" (1.68m)	141 lb (64kg)	1998-08-20	Arizona	4
G	0	(United States)	Mitchell, Kelsey	5' 8" (1.73m)	155 lb (70kg)	1995-11-12	Ohio State	7
F/C	21	(United States)	Timpson, Makayla	6' 2" (1.88m)	173 lb (78kg)	2002-09-20	Florida State	R
F/C	11	(United States)	Turner, Brianna	6' 3" (1.91m)	175 lb (79kg)	1996-07-05	Notre Dame	6
G	–	(Australia)	Wallace, Kristy (S)	5' 11" (1.8m)	157 lb (71kg)	1996-01-03	Baylor	3

Head coach
(United States) Stephanie White (Purdue)
Assistant coaches
(United States) Briann January (Arizona State)
(United States) Karima Christmas-Kelly (Duke)
(United States) Austin Kelly (Duke)
Player development
(United States) Keith Porter (Connecticut Avery Point)
Athletic trainer
(United States) Todd Champlin (Daemen)
Assistant trainer
(United States) Alexis Gholston (Sacramento State)
Strength and conditioning coach
(United States) Sarah Kessler (Queensland)

Legend

- (C) Team captain
- (DP) Unsigned draft pick
- (FA) Free agent
- (S) Suspended
- Injured

=== Minnesota Lynx ===
2025 Minnesota Lynx roster
Players
Coaches

Pos.	No.	Nat.	Name	Height	Weight	DOB	From	Yrs
G/F	6	(Canada)	Carleton, Bridget	6' 2" (1.88m)	177 lb (80kg)	1997-05-22	Iowa State	6
F	24	(United States)	Collier, Napheesa	6' 1" (1.85m)	180 lb (82kg)	1996-09-23	Connecticut	6
G	2	(United States)	Hiedeman, Natisha	5' 8" (1.73m)	132 lb (60kg)	1997-02-10	Marquette	6
C	77	(Russia)	Kliundikova, Maria	6' 4" (1.93m)	185 lb (84kg)	1998-07-16	Russia	2
F	7	(Russia)	Kosu, Anastasiia	6' 1" (1.85m)	190 lb (86kg)	2005-04-21	Russia	R
G	21	(United States)	McBride, Kayla	5' 11" (1.8m)	179 lb (81kg)	1992-06-25	Notre Dame	11
G	1	(United States)	Miller, Diamond	6' 3" (1.91m)	178 lb (81kg)	2001-02-11	Maryland	2
F	35	(United States)	Pili, Alissa	5' 11" (1.8m)	235 lb (107kg)	2001-06-08	Utah	1
G	44	(United States)	Samuelson, Karlie (injured)	6' 0" (1.83m)	162 lb (73kg)	1995-05-10	Stanford	6
F	15	(Slovenia)	Shepard, Jessica	6' 4" (1.93m)	175 lb (79kg)	1996-09-11	Notre Dame	4
F	8	(Australia)	Smith, Alanna	6' 4" (1.93m)	177 lb (80kg)	1996-09-10	Stanford	6
G	10	(United States)	Williams, Courtney	5' 8" (1.73m)	148 lb (67kg)	1994-05-11	South Florida	9
G/F	–	(United States)	Griffin, Aubrey (injured) (DP)	6' 1" (1.85m)		2001-11-06	Connecticut	–
F	–	(France)	Hirsch, Maïa (DP)	6' 5" (1.96m)		2003-11-13	France	–
G/F	–	(Hungary)	Juhász, Dorka (S)	6' 5" (1.96m)	201 lb (91kg)	1999-12-18	Connecticut	2

Head coach
(United States) Cheryl Reeve (La Salle)
Assistant coaches
(United States) Rebekkah Brunson (Georgetown)
(United States) Elaine Powell (LSU)
(United States) Eric Thibault (Missouri)
(United States) Lindsay Whalen (Minnesota)
Athletic trainer
(United States) Chuck Barta (UW–La Crosse)
Assistant trainer
(United States) Brandi BlueArm (Minnesota State)
Strength and conditioning coach
(United States) Andrea Hayden (Missouri Baptist)

Legend

- (C) Team captain
- (DP) Unsigned draft pick
- (FA) Free agent
- (S) Suspended
- Injured
