= 2025 Los Angeles Sparks season =

- Head coach: Lynne Roberts
- Arena: Crypto.com Arena (Capacity: 19,068)

Results
- Record: 21–23 (.477)
- Place: 6th (Western)
- Playoff finish: Did not qualify

Media
- Television: ABC, ESPN, ESPN2, CBS, Paramount+, CBSSN, NBA TV, ION

The 2025 Los Angeles Sparks was the franchise's 29th season in the Women's National Basketball Association, and the first season under head coach Lynne Roberts.

In addition to their preseason match-up against Golden State on May 6, the Sparks also had a closed scrimmage versus Seattle on May 10 at Pauley Pavilion.

== Draft ==
Round	Pick	Player	Position	Nationality	College/Club	Outcome	Ref.
1	9	Sarah Ashlee Barker	G	United States	Alabama	Signed rookie contract on April 18; Made opening day roster	
2	21	Sania Feagin	F	United States	South Carolina	Signed rookie contract on April 16; Made opening day roster	
3	28	Liatu King	F	United States	Notre Dame	Signed rookie contract on April 17; Waived on May 12; Signed rest-of-season hardship contract on May 20; Released on June 29	

== Transactions ==
=== Front office and coaching ===
Date	Details	Ref.
November 19, 2024	Hired Lynne Roberts as head coach	
January 2, 2025	Hired Danielle Robinson as Manager of Basketball Integration and Scout Support	
January 18, 2025	Hired Nikki Blue and Zak Buncik as assistant coaches	
March 26, 2025	Hired Mike Neighbors as an assistant coach	
March 26, 2025	Hired Sed Everett as Director of Player Development	
March 26, 2025	Hired Deonte Henderson as an assistant player development coach	
April 24, 2025	Hired Danielle Robinson as an assistant coach (retained role as Manager of Basketball Integration)	
July 22, 2025	Hired Latricia Trammell as special assistant to head coach	

=== Trades ===
February
February 1 (Three-team trade)	To Los Angeles Sparks Kelsey Plum (from Las Vegas Aces); 2025 No. 9 draft pick and a 2026 second round draft pick (from Seattle Storm)	To Las Vegas Aces Jewell Loyd (from Seattle Storm); 2025 No. 13 draft pick (from Los Angeles Sparks)
February 1 (Three-team trade)	To Seattle Storm 2025 No. 2 draft pick and rights to Li Yueru (from Los Angeles Sparks); 2026 first-round draft pick (from Las Vegas Aces)	
February 14	To Los Angeles Sparks 2025 No. 21 draft pick 2027 second round draft pick	To Seattle Storm Lexie Brown; 2025 No. 26 draft pick

=== Free agency ===
==== Re-signed / activated ====
Player	Date	Notes	Ref.
Julie Allemand	January 1	Set as active	
Julie Allemand	July 1	Set as active	
Odyssey Sims	February 2	One-year deal	
Masha Kliundikova	February 13	Training camp contract	
Aari McDonald	April 15	Training camp contract	

==== Additions ====
Player	Date	Notes	Former Team	Ref.
Emma Cannon	February 2	Training camp contract	Henan Phoenix	
Anneli Maley	February 2	Training camp contract	Perth Lynx	
Shaneice Swain	February 5	Rookie contract (2023 draft pick – No. 14)	Sydney Flames	
Mercedes Russell	February 11	One-year deal	Seattle Storm	
Alyssa Ustby	April 15	Training camp contract	North Carolina Tar Heels	
Sania Feagin	April 16	Rookie contract (2025 draft pick – No. 21)	South Carolina Gamecocks	
Liatu King	April 17	Rookie contract (2025 draft pick – No. 28)	Notre Dame Fighting Irish	
Liatu King	May 20	Rest of season hardship contract	Free agent	
Sarah Ashlee Barker	April 18	Rookie contract (2025 draft pick – No. 9)	Alabama Crimson Tide	
Shey Peddy	June 14	Rest of season hardship contract	Athletes Unlimited	
Grace Berger	June 17	Rest of season hardship contract	Indiana Fever	
Julie Vanloo	July 3	Awarded off waivers	Golden State Valkyries	
Julie Vanloo	July 3	Set as active	Golden State Valkyries	
Alissa Pili	August 3	7-day contract	Free agent	
Alissa Pili	August 10	7-day contract	Free agent	
Alissa Pili	August 17	7-day contract	Free agent	
Alissa Pili	August 24	Rest of season contract	Free agent	

=== Subtractions / unsigned ===
Player	Date	Reason	New Team	Ref.
Crystal Dangerfield	—	Free agency – unrestricted	—	
Layshia Clarendon	September 20, 2024	Retired	N/A	
Stephanie Talbot	December 6, 2024	Expansion draft	Golden State Valkyries	
Zia Cooke	February 1, 2025	Waived	Seattle Storm	
Kia Nurse	February 4, 2025	Free agency – unrestricted	Chicago Sky	
Anneli Maley	May 1, 2025	Waived	—	
Alyssa Ustby	May 1, 2025	Waived	—	
Liatu King	May 12, 2025	Waived	—	
Liatu King	June 29, 2025	Released	—	
Masha Kliundikova	May 14, 2025	Waived	Minnesota Lynx	
Aari McDonald	May 14, 2025	Waived	Indiana Fever	
Shaneice Swain	May 15, 2025	Waived	—	
Julie Allemand	June 10, 2025	Suspended contract – temporary	N/A – retained rights	
Grace Berger	June 20, 2025	Released	Dallas Wings	
Shey Peddy	July 2, 2025	Released	Indiana Fever	
Odyssey Sims	July 2, 2025	Waived	Indiana Fever	
Mercedes Russell	July 12, 2025	Waived	—	

== Roster ==
2025 Los Angeles Sparks roster
Players
Coaches

Pos.	No.	Nat.	Name	Height	Weight	DOB	From	Yrs
G	20	(Belgium)	Allemand, Julie	5' 8" (1.73m)	147 lb (67kg)	1996-07-07	Belgium	2
G	13	(United States)	Barker, Sarah Ashlee	6' 0" (1.83m)		2001-09-10	Alabama	R
F	22	(United States)	Brink, Cameron	6' 4" (1.93m)	170 lb (77kg)	2001-12-31	Stanford	1
G/F	12	(United States)	Burrell, Rae	6' 2" (1.88m)	168 lb (76kg)	2000-06-21	Tennessee	3
F	32	(United States)	Cannon, Emma	6' 2" (1.88m)	190 lb (86kg)	1989-06-01	Florida Southern	6
F	1	(United States)	Feagin, Sania	6' 3" (1.91m)		2003-03-15	South Carolina	R
F	5	(United States)	Hamby, Dearica	6' 3" (1.91m)	189 lb (86kg)	1993-11-06	Wake Forest	10
F	2	(United States)	Jackson, Rickea	6' 2" (1.88m)	175 lb (79kg)	2001-03-16	Tennessee	1
F	24	(United States)	Pili, Alissa	5' 11" (1.8m)	235 lb (107kg)	2001-06-08	Utah	1
G	10	(United States)	Plum, Kelsey	5' 8" (1.73m)	145 lb (66kg)	1994-08-24	Washington	7
F/C	23	(United States)	Stevens, Azurá	6' 6" (1.98m)	180 lb (82kg)	1996-02-01	Connecticut	7
G	35	(Belgium)	Vanloo, Julie	5' 8" (1.73m)		1993-02-10	Belgium	1

Head coach
(United States) Lynne Roberts (Seattle Pacific)
Assistant coaches
(United States) Zak Buncik (UT Arlington)
(United States) Mike Neighbors (Arkansas)
(United States) Danielle Robinson (Oklahoma)
Player development
(United States) Sed Everett
Athletic trainer
(United States) Karissa Scherer

Legend

- (C) Team captain
- (DP) Unsigned draft pick
- (FA) Free agent
- (S) Suspended
- Injured

=== Depth chart ===
Pos.	Starter	Bench
PG	Kelsey Plum	Julie Vanloo
SG	Julie Allemand	Sarah Ashlee Barker
SF	Rickea Jackson	Rae Burrell; Alissa Pili
PF	Dearica Hamby	Emma Cannon; Sania Feagin
C	Azurá Stevens	Cameron Brink

== Schedule ==
=== Preseason ===
2025 pre-season game log
Total: 1–0 (Home: 0–0; Road: 1–0)
May: 1–0 (Home: 0–0; Road: 1–0)

Game	Date	Team	Score	High points	High rebounds	High assists	Location Attendance	Record
1	May 6	@ Golden State	W 83–82	Rickea Jackson (13)	Azurá Stevens (11)	Dearica Hamby (6)	Chase Center; 17,428	1–0

2025 pre-season schedule

=== Regular season ===
2025 game log
Total: 21–23 (Home: 9–13; Road: 12–10)
May: 2–5 (Home: 1–3; Road: 1–2)

Game	Date	Team	Score	High points	High rebounds	High assists	Location Attendance	Record
1	May 16	@ Golden State	W 84–67	Kelsey Plum (37)	Dearica Hamby (10)	Plum, Sims (6)	Chase Center; 18,064	1–0
2	May 18	Minnesota	L 75–83	Azurá Stevens (21)	Dearica Hamby (10)	Kelsey Plum (5)	Crypto.com Arena; 11,170	1–1
3	May 21	@ Phoenix	L 86–89	Kelsey Plum (25)	Azurá Stevens (17)	Kelsey Plum (6)	PHX Arena; 8,024	1–2
4	May 23	Golden State	L 72–83	Dearica Hamby (25)	Azurá Stevens (10)	Sarah Ashlee Barker (4)	Crypto.com Arena; 10,857	1–3
5	May 25	Chicago	W 91–78	Kelsey Plum (28)	Azurá Stevens (8)	Kelsey Plum (8)	Crypto.com Arena; 11,422	2–3
6	May 27	Atlanta	L 82–88	Dearica Hamby (28)	Azurá Stevens (11)	Dearica Hamby (8)	Crypto.com Arena; 10,797	2–4
7	May 30	@ Las Vegas	L 81–96	Kelsey Plum (17)	Dearica Hamby (10)	Dearica Hamby (6)	Michelob Ultra Arena; 10,504	2–5

June : 3–7 (Home: 0–4; Road: 3–3)

Game	Date	Team	Score	High points	High rebounds	High assists	Location Attendance	Record
8	June 1	Phoenix	L 80–85	Odyssey Sims (32)	Dearica Hamby (8)	Julie Allemand (6)	Crypto.com Arena; 11,033	2–6
9	June 6	@ Dallas	W 93–79	Azurá Stevens (21)	Azurá Stevens (6)	Kelsey Plum (9)	College Park Center; 6,007	3–6
10	June 9	Golden State	L 81–89 (OT)	Kelsey Plum (24)	Dearica Hamby (9)	Kelsey Plum (7)	Crypto.com Arena; 10,921	3–7
11	June 11	@ Las Vegas	W 97–89	Rickea Jackson (30)	Azurá Stevens (10)	Dearica Hamby (7)	Michelob Ultra Arena; 10,417	4–7
12	June 14	@ Minnesota	L 77–101	Kelsey Plum (20)	Dearica Hamby (12)	Kelsey Plum (4)	Target Center; 10,810	4–8
13	June 17	Seattle	L 67–98	Rickea Jackson (17)	Azurá Stevens (10)	Hamby, Peddy (3)	Crypto.com Arena; 10,581	4–9
14	June 21	@ Minnesota	L 66–82	Kelsey Plum (15)	Azurá Stevens (9)	Kelsey Plum (4)	Target Center; 8,777	4–10
15	June 24	@ Chicago	L 86–97	Azurá Stevens (21)	Hamby, Stevens (7)	Hamby, Peddy, Plum (5)	Wintrust Arena; 8,004	4–11
16	June 26	@ Indiana	W 85–75	Azurá Stevens (23)	Hamby, Stevens (7)	Kelsey Plum (6)	Gainbridge Fieldhouse; 17,274	5–11
17	June 29	Chicago	L 85–92	Kelsey Plum (22)	Dearica Hamby (10)	Kelsey Plum (7)	Crypto.com Arena; 13,523	5–12

July : 6–3 (Home: 2–2; Road: 4–1)

Game	Date	Team	Score	High points	High rebounds	High assists	Location Attendance	Record
18	July 3	@ New York	L 79–89	Dearica Hamby (25)	Dearica Hamby (9)	Kelsey Plum (8)	Barclays Center; 15,956	5-13
19	July 5	@ Indiana	W 89–87	Azurá Stevens (21)	Azurá Stevens (12)	Allemand, Jackson (5)	Gainbridge Fieldhouse; 17,274	6-13
20	July 10	Minnesota	L 82–91	Kelsey Plum (17)	Azurá Stevens (10)	Kelsey Plum (12)	Crypto.com Arena; 18,199	6–14
21	July 13	Connecticut	W 92–86	Kelsey Plum (23)	Azurá Stevens (11)	Julie Allemand (6)	Crypto.com Arena; 12,184	7–14
22	July 15	Washington	W 99–80	Dearica Hamby (26)	Azurá Stevens (8)	Julie Allemand (10)	Crypto.com Arena; 10,787	8–14
All-Star Game
23	July 22	@ Washington	W 93–86	Dearica Hamby (24)	Dearica Hamby (14)	Kelsey Plum (7)	CareFirst Arena; 4,200	9–14
24	July 24	@ Connecticut	W 101–86	Kelsey Plum (30)	Dearica Hamby (11)	Kelsey Plum (6)	Mohegan Sun Arena; 7,375	10–14
25	July 26	@ New York	W 101–99	Rickea Jackson (24)	Azurá Stevens (11)	Julie Allemand (10)	Barclays Center; 16,024	11–14
26	July 29	Las Vegas	L 74–89	Kelsey Plum (22)	Azurá Stevens (8)	Kelsey Plum (8)	Crypto.com Arena; 12,449	11–15

August : 7–5 (Home: 5–3; Road: 2–2)

Game	Date	Team	Score	High points	High rebounds	High assists	Location Attendance	Record
27	August 1	@ Seattle	W 108–106 (2OT)	Rickea Jackson (27)	Dearica Hamby (13)	Kelsey Plum (7)	Climate Pledge Arena; 11,354	12–15
28	August 5	Indiana	W 100–91	Jackson, Plum (25)	Julie Allemand (8)	Kelsey Plum (11)	Crypto.com Arena; 16,035	13–15
29	August 7	Connecticut	W 102–91	Dearica Hamby (21)	Julie Allemand (10)	Julie Allemand (11)	Crypto.com Arena; 10,780	14–15
30	August 9	@ Golden State	L 59–72	Dearica Hamby (15)	Jackson, Stevens (6)	Kelsey Plum (4)	Chase Center; 18,064	14–16
31	August 10	Seattle	W 94–91	Kelsey Plum (20)	Azurá Stevens (8)	Julie Allemand (8)	Crypto.com Arena; 11,796	15–16
32	August 12	New York	L 97–105	Kelsey Plum (26)	Dearica Hamby (8)	Julie Allemand (6)	Crypto.com Arena; 11,862	15–17
33	August 15	@ Dallas	W 97–96	Kelsey Plum (28)	Dearica Hamby (10)	Julie Allemand (10)	College Park Center; 6,116	16–17
34	August 17	@ Washington	L 86–95	Dearica Hamby (26)	Dearica Hamby (4)	Dearica Hamby (7)	CareFirst Arena; 4,200	16–18
35	August 20	Dallas	W 81–80	Rickea Jackson (25)	Dearica Hamby (9)	Julie Allemand (8)	Crypto.com Arena; 13,598	17–18
36	August 26	Phoenix	L 84–92	Dearica Hamby (25)	Dearica Hamby (8)	Julie Allemand (6)	Crypto.com Arena; 10,726	17–19
37	August 29	Indiana	L 75–76	Azurá Stevens (17)	Dearica Hamby (7)	Azurá Stevens (5)	Crypto.com Arena; 15,419	17–20
38	August 31	Washington	W 81–78	Dearica Hamby (20)	Hamby, Stevens (12)	Kelsey Plum (7)	Crypto.com Arena; 12,218	18–20

September : 3–3 (Home: 1–1; Road: 2–2)

Game	Date	Team	Score	High points	High rebounds	High assists	Location Attendance	Record
39	September 1	@ Seattle	W 91–85	Dearica Hamby (27)	Dearica Hamby (11)	Kelsey Plum (7)	Climate Pledge Arena; 12,500	19–20
40	September 3	@ Atlanta	L 75–86	Dearica Hamby (21)	Dearica Hamby (9)	Kelsey Plum (7)	Gateway Center Arena; 3,265	19–21
41	September 5	@ Atlanta	L 85–104	Dearica Hamby (26)	Azurá Stevens (8)	Allemand, Hamby (5)	Gateway Center Arena; 3,314	19–22
42	September 7	Dallas	W 91–77	Julie Allemand (21)	Azurá Stevens (11)	Allemand, Hamby (4)	Crypto.com Arena; 13,868	20–22
43	September 9	@ Phoenix	W 88–83	Dearica Hamby (25)	Hamby, Stevens (9)	Hamby, Plum (5)	PHX Arena; 13,151	21–22
44	September 11	Las Vegas	L 75–103	Barker, Hamby, Plum (15)	Azurá Stevens (12)	Kelsey Plum (8)	Crypto.com Arena; 13,484	21–23

2025 season schedule

Notes:

- Games highlighted in ██ represent Commissioner's Cup games.

== Standings ==
#	Team	W	L	PCT	GB	Conf.	Home	Road	Cup
1	yx – Minnesota Lynx	34	10	.773	–	20–4	20–2	14–8	5–1
2	x – Las Vegas Aces	30	14	.682	4	16–8	17–5	13–9	2–4
3	x – Atlanta Dream	30	14	.682	4	15–6	16–6	14–8	3–2
4	x – Phoenix Mercury	27	17	.614	7	13–11	15–7	12–10	4–2
5	x – New York Liberty	27	17	.614	7	15–5	17–5	10–12	4–1
6	cx – Indiana Fever	24	20	.545	10	13–8	13–9	11–11	4–1
7	x – Seattle Storm	23	21	.523	11	12–12	10–12	13–9	4–2
8	x – Golden State Valkyries	23	21	.523	11	9–15	14–8	9–13	3–3
9	e – Los Angeles Sparks	21	23	.477	13	10–14	9–13	12–10	2–4
10	e – Washington Mystics	16	28	.364	18	8–12	10–12	6–16	2–3
11	e – Connecticut Sun	11	33	.250	23	7–14	7–15	4–18	1–4
12	e – Chicago Sky	10	34	.227	24	4–17	6–16	4–18	1–4
13	e – Dallas Wings	10	34	.227	24	4–20	6–16	4–18	1–5

Notes

(#) – League Standing
c – Commissioner's Cup winners
y – Regular Season Champion
x – Clinched playoff berth
e – Eliminated from playoff contention
Source: Overall standings and Commissioner's Cup Standings

== Statistics ==
Legend
GP	Games played	GS	Games started	MPG	Minutes per game	RPG	Rebounds per game
APG	Assists per game	SPG	Steals per game	BPG	Blocks per game	PPG	Points per game
FG%	Field-goal percentage	3P%	3-point field-goal percentage	FT%	Free-throw percentage	TO	Turnovers per game
PF	Fouls per game		Team leader		League leader

=== Regular season ===
Player	GP	GS	MPG	FG%	3P%	FT%	RPG	APG	SPG	BPG	TO	PPG
Kelsey Plum	43	43	35.1	42.2%	35.5%	89.3%	3.1	5.7	1.2	0.1	3.0	19.5
Dearica Hamby	44	44	31.2	57.2%	27.8%	62.7%	7.9	3.3	1.6	0.5	2.7	18.4
Rickea Jackson	38	37	30.9	42.4%	34.8%	84.7%	3.2	1.7	0.6	0.4	2.1	14.7
Odyssey Sims	12	11	29.5	41.7%	35.3%	76.5%	2.9	3.5	0.8	0.1	1.4	9.8
Azurá Stevens	44	44	28.4	47.8%	38.1%	79.0%	8.0	2.1	1.2	1.1	1.5	12.8
Julie Allemand	34	27	28.3	44.0%	27.7%	78.9%	3.7	5.0	1.3	0.0	1.6	5.4
Shey Peddy	6	5	23.0	41.7%	38.5%	83.3%	3.0	2.7	0.3	0.0	0.7	5.0
Rae Burrell	28	1	18.4	43.3%	32.8%	74.5%	2.3	1.2	0.6	0.2	0.9	7.5
Grace Berger	1	0	16.0	0.0%	0.0%	—	1.0	1.0	—	—	3.0	—
Sarah Ashlee Barker	34	8	14.1	33.7%	29.5%	70.8%	1.9	0.9	0.3	0.1	1.1	3.1
Cameron Brink	19	0	12.8	42.7%	29.4%	76.2%	4.3	0.5	0.5	1.4	1.3	5.1
Julie Vanloo	26	0	10.3	30.2%	31.5%	75.0%	0.6	1.2	0.3	—	1.0	2.2
Emma Cannon	21	0	10.1	50.8%	38.9%	65.2%	1.8	0.4	0.5	0.0	0.8	4.4
Liatu King	12	0	10.0	50.0%	16.7%	73.3%	2.1	0.3	0.2	—	0.9	3.0
Mercedes Russell	20	0	8.2	44.4%	—	71.4%	1.2	0.6	0.3	0.2	0.4	1.7
Sania Feagin	16	0	4.8	35.7%	0.0%	0.0%	0.7	0.3	—	0.4	0.4	1.3
Alissa Pili	5	0	3.4	50.0%	0.0%	90.9%	0.4	—	—	0.2	0.2	3.2

== Awards and honors ==
Recipient	Award	Date awarded	Ref.
Dearica Hamby	Western Conference Player of the Week	July 29	
Kelsey Plum	WNBA All-Star Reserve	July 7	
Kelsey Plum	AP All-WNBA Second Team	September 12	
