= Lexie Hull =

American basketball player (born 1999)

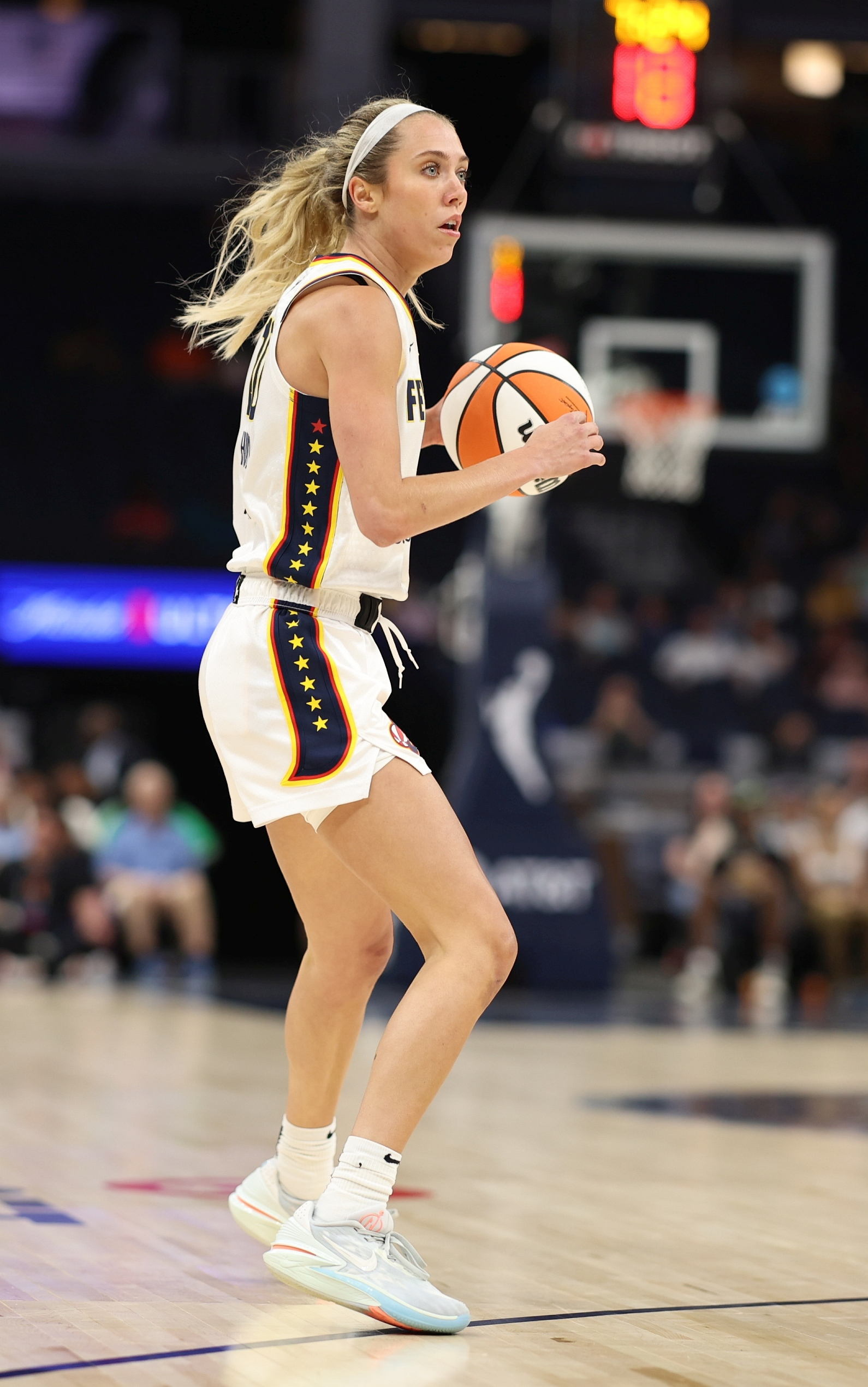
- Hull with the Indiana Fever in 2023

No. 10 – Indiana Fever
- Position: Shooting guard / small forward
- League: WNBA

Personal information
- Born: September 13, 1999 (age 27) Liberty Lake, Washington, U.S.
- Listed height: 6 ft 2 in (1.88 m)
- Listed weight: 155 lb (70 kg)

Career information
- High school: Central Valley (Spokane Valley, Washington)
- College: Stanford (2018–2022)
- WNBA draft: 2022: 1st round, 6th overall pick
- Drafted by: Indiana Fever
- Playing career: 2022–present

Career history
- 2022–present: Indiana Fever
- 2023–2024: Athletes Unlimited League
- 2025–present: Rose BC

Career highlights
- WNBA Commissioner's Cup champion (2025); Unrivaled champion (2025); NCAA champion (2021); Senior CLASS Award (2022); 3× All-Pac-12 Team (2020–2022); 2× Pac-12 All-Defensive Team (2020, 2022); Pac-12 Scholar Athlete of the Year (2022); Elite 90 Award (2022)
- Stats at Basketball Reference
Medals
Women's 3x3 basketball
Representing the United States
Pan American Games
Gold medal – first place	2023 Santiago	Team
FIBA 3x3 Under-23 World Cup
Silver medal – second place	2022 Bucharest	Team
FIBA 3x3 AmeriCup
Bronze medal – third place	2022 Miami	Team

Lexie Lauren Hull (born September 13, 1999) is an American professional basketball player for the Indiana Fever of the Women's National Basketball Association (WNBA) and Rose of Unrivaled. She played college basketball for the Stanford Cardinal, with whom she was a three-time All-Pac-12 selection, won the national championship as a junior and received the Senior CLASS Award and Elite 90 Award in her senior season. Hull attended Central Valley High School in Spokane Valley, Washington, where she helped her team win two state titles and was rated a five-star recruit by ESPN.

== Early life ==
Hull was born on September 13, 1999, and lived in the Spokane suburb of Liberty Lake, Washington. She grew up playing basketball against her twin sister, Lacie. From third to eighth grade, Hull was coached by her father and his friend, Ron Hawkins, with the Lady Cubs Amateur Athletic Union (AAU) program. She competed for Central Valley High School in Spokane Valley, Washington, from 2014 to 2018. As a freshman, Hull averaged 13.8 points and 6.3 rebounds per game. In her sophomore season, she averaged 18.1 points and 8.6 rebounds per game, leading her team to the Class 4A state title, where she was named tournament most valuable player (MVP). She also won the Associated Press (AP) Class 4A Player of the Year award.

As a junior at Central Valley, Hull averaged 16.5 points, 7.3 rebounds and 3.2 steals per game, guiding her team to a fourth-place finish at the state tournament. She was honored as Washington Gatorade Player of the Year, AP Class 4A Player of the Year and Greater Spokane League MVP. As a senior, Hull averaged 20.4 points, 8.4 rebounds, 2.6 steals and 2.1 assists per game. She led Central Valley to a 29–0 record and the Class 4A state title, earning tournament MVP. Hull also led her team to the GEICO Nationals championship, posting 26 points and 10 rebounds to upset Hamilton Heights Christian Academy in the title game. She was named Washington Gatorade Player of the Year, AP Washington All-Classification Player of the Year, The News Tribune Player of the Year, The Seattle Times Co-Player of the Year with Lacie and Greater Spokane League MVP. Hull finished her high school career as Central Valley's all-time leading scorer.

During high school, Hull played for the Spokane Stars on the AAU circuit. In addition to basketball, she competed in track for four years, making the all-conference team, and volleyball for one year at the varsity level for Central Valley. As a senior, she placed 9th at the State Championships for track and field.

Hull was a five-star recruit and the number 14 player in the 2018 class by ESPN. On October 23, 2016, she committed to play college basketball for Stanford along with her sister. Hull chose the Cardinal over offers from Gonzaga, Washington, Washington State, Oregon and Arizona State. She had been drawn to the engineering and business programs at Stanford University, and a home visit in September by head coach Tara VanDerveer helped secure her commitment.

== College career ==
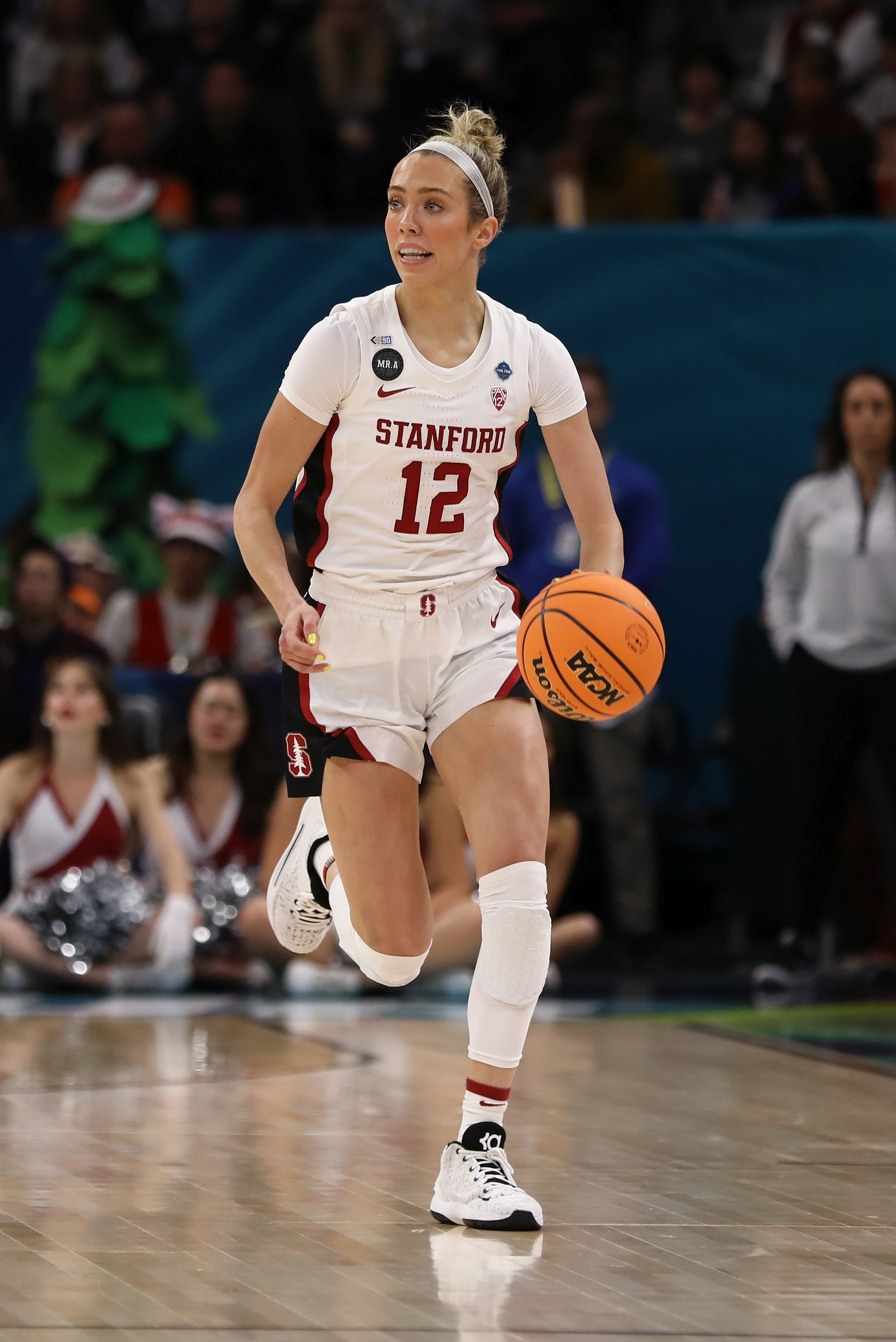
Hull with Stanford in 2022

On November 7, 2018, Hull made her debut for Stanford, recording 11 points, 11 rebounds and four steals in a 71–43 win against UC Davis. She became the first freshman in program history to register a double-double in their debut. In her next game, on November 11, Hull scored a season-high 17 points in a 115–71 win over Idaho. As a freshman, Hull averaged 5.6 points and 4.7 rebounds per game, and helped Stanford win the Pac-12 Tournament. She made the Pac-12 All-Freshman honorable mention, despite missing nine games with a left foot injury. She became a full-time starter in her sophomore season. On January 24, 2020, Hull scored a season-high 29 points in a 76–68 overtime win over Colorado. She helped her team return to the Pac-12 Tournament final after recording 28 points and nine rebounds in a 67–51 semifinal victory over UCLA. As a sophomore, she averaged 13.6 points, six rebounds and 2.1 assists per game, earning All-Pac-12 and Pac-12 All-Defensive honors.

Hull scored a junior season-high 24 points in a 75–55 win over UCLA at the 2021 Pac-12 Tournament title game. She was named to the all-tournament team. At the Elite Eight of the NCAA tournament, Hull posted 21 points and nine rebounds in a 78–63 victory against Louisville. She had 18 points and 13 rebounds in a 66–65 win over South Carolina at the Final Four. In the title game, Hull recorded 10 points and 10 rebounds in a 54–53 win against Arizona, helping Stanford win its first national championship since 1992. She was selected to the Final Four all-tournament team. As a junior, Hull averaged 11.6 points and 5.1 rebounds per game, and repeated on the All-Pac-12 Team. On January 7, 2022, she scored 33 points and made seven three-pointers in an 80–68 victory over Oregon. She won her third Pac-12 Tournament. In the second round of the 2022 NCAA tournament, Hull scored a career-high 36 points with six three-pointers in a 91–65 win against Kansas. She helped Stanford return to the Final Four. As a senior, Hull averaged 12.5 points, 5.1 rebounds and 2.2 steals per game, earning her third consecutive All-Pac-12 selection. On April 4, 2022, she declared for the 2022 WNBA draft.

== Professional career ==
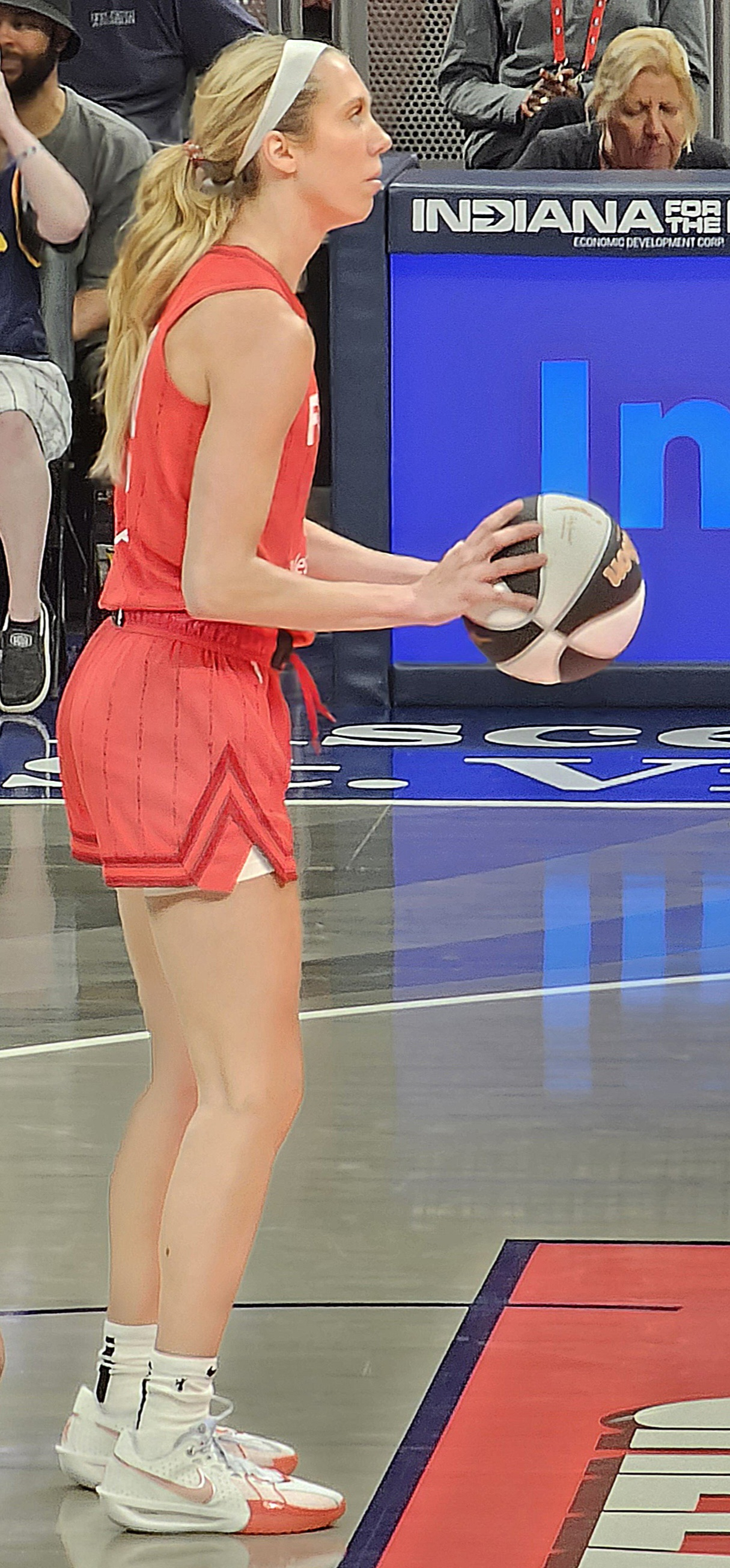
Hull with the Indiana Fever in 2024

=== WNBA ===
Hull was selected with the sixth overall pick by the Indiana Fever in the 2022 WNBA draft, despite being projected as a late first-round or second-round prospect by most media outlets.

=== Athletes Unlimited ===
Hull appeared in Athletes Unlimited Pro Basketball in 2023, finished 8th on the leaderboard, and was named Defensive Player of the Year. For the 2024 Athletes Unlimited season, Hull was named week 1 team captain, finished 20th on the leaderboard, and was again named to AU's All-Defensive Team.

=== Unrivaled ===
On October 30, 2024, it was announced that Hull would appear and play in the inaugural 2025 season of Unrivaled, the women's 3-on-3 basketball league founded by Napheesa Collier and Breanna Stewart. She was selected for Rose BC. Rose won the first ever Unrivaled championship.

== Career statistics ==
Legend
GP	Games played	GS	Games started	MPG	Minutes per game	RPG	Rebounds per game
APG	Assists per game	SPG	Steals per game	BPG	Blocks per game	PPG	Points per game
TO	Turnovers per game	FG%	Field-goal percentage	3P%	3-point field-goal percentage	FT%	Free-throw percentage
**Bold**	Career best	°	League leader

*	Denotes season(s) in which Hull won an NCAA Championship

=== WNBA ===
==== Regular season ====
WNBA regular season statistics
Year	Team	GP	GS	MPG	FG%	3P%	FT%	RPG	APG	SPG	BPG	TO	PPG
2022	Indiana	26	4	12.8	.267	.186	**.900**	1.5	.7	.6	.1	**.7**	3.8
2023	Indiana	30	25	20.6	.372	.217	.773	2.7	1.1	1.0	**.3**	1.0	4.6
2024	Indiana	34	11	19.7	**.441**	**.471**	.805	2.5	1.1	.6	**.3**	.9	5.5
2025	Indiana	**44**	30	**27.0**	.395	.367	.722	**4.3**	**1.8**	**1.2**	.2	.9	**7.2**
2026	Indiana	**44**°	**41**	18.6	.428	.337	.829	3.0	.7	.6	.2	.8	5.2
**Career**	5 years, 1 team	178	111	20.4	.390	.337	.810	3.0	1.1	.8	.2	.8	5.4

==== Playoffs ====
WNBA playoff statistics
Year	Team	GP	GS	MPG	FG%	3P%	FT%	RPG	APG	SPG	BPG	TO	PPG
2024	Indiana	2	2	30.0	.308	.143	**.800**	4.5	**2.0**	**2.5**	.5	1.5	6.5
2025	Indiana	**8**	**8**	**33.5**	.341	.295	.722	**5.0**	**2.0**	.9	**.6**	1.9	**10.3**
2026	Indiana	3	3	19.0	**.375**	**.333**	.667	3.7	.7	.3	.0	**.0**	3.0
**Career**	3 years, 1 team	13	13	29.6	.340	.278	.731	4.6	1.7	1.0	.5	1.4	8.0

=== College ===
NCAA statistics
Year	Team	GP	GS	MPG	FG%	3P%	FT%	RPG	APG	SPG	BPG	TO	PPG
2018–19	Stanford	27	3	20.2	.398	.382	**.864**	4.7	.9	.8	.2	**1.2**	5.6
2019–20	Stanford	33	33	**30.8**	.406	.370	.775	**6.0**	**2.1**	1.6	**.5**	2.0	**13.6**
2020–21*	Stanford	32	32	26.5	.381	.352	.817	5.1	1.7	1.6	.4	1.6	11.6
2021–22	Stanford	**35**	**35**	30.2	**.408**	**.393**	.744	5.1	2.0	**2.2**	.2	1.9	12.5
**Career**		127	103	27.3	.399	.374	.787	5.2	1.7	1.6	.3	1.7	11.1

== Off the court ==
=== Personal life ===
Hull is the daughter of Jaime and Jason Hull. She has an identical twin sister, Lacie, who was her basketball teammate in high school and college. Hull's father, Jason, played college basketball for Whitworth University, where he received NCAA Division III All-America honors. Her grandfather, John, played college basketball for Western Washington.

Hull had a 4.0 grade point average (GPA) in high school. She graduated from Stanford with both a bachelor's degree and master's degree in management science and engineering. In her junior and senior years, Hull was named a first-team Academic All-American by the College Sports Information Directors of America (CoSIDA). She is a three-time CoSIDA Academic All-District first team and Pac-12 Academic Honor Roll selection. As a senior, Hull received the Elite 90 Award for having the highest cumulative GPA among players at the Final Four of the 2022 NCAA Tournament, as well as Pac-12 Scholar-Athlete of the Year for women's basketball and the Senior CLASS Award as the outstanding senior both on and off the court in D-I women's basketball.

=== Philanthropy ===
In February 2024, Hull joined the WNBA Changemakers Collective and their collaboration with VOICEINSPORT (VIS) as a mentor, "aimed at keeping girls in sport and developing diverse leaders on the court and beyond the game."

=== Business interests ===
In June 2024, Hull announced her partnership with Sweetgreen on her social media platforms. In the fall of 2024, Hull also partnered with Lightbox Jewelry and was named a brand ambassador (alongside NBA player, Paul George) for FORM, a basketball training company focusing on shooting technique. In October 2024, Hull appeared in a TikTok ad campaign for TOGETHXR and Aflac alongside Fever teammate, Aliyah Boston. Hull partnered with Athleta and their "Power of She Collective" in January 2025, joining fellow female athletes Simone Biles, Katie Ledecky, and Kate Martin. In March 2026, Hull launched her makeup brand Forta with her college friend Sarah Guller. The brand is designed to hold up through sweat, and its first product launch was the Lock & Go Setting Spray.
