= 2025 Minnesota Lynx season =

- Head coach: Cheryl Reeve
- Arena: Target Center

Results
- Record: 34–10 (.773)
- Place: 1st (Western)
- Playoff finish: 1st seed Lost in Semifinals 1–3 to Phoenix Mercury

Media
- Television: FanDuel Sports Network North; ESPN; CBS Sports Network; ION; Amazon Prime Video

The 2025 Minnesota Lynx season was the 27th season for the Minnesota Lynx of the Women's National Basketball Association, and the sixteenth season under head coach Cheryl Reeve.

The season tipped-off on Friday, May 16, 2025, in Dallas against the Wings. Entering as the defending Commissioner's Cup champions, Minnesota advanced to the 2025 WNBA Commissioner's Cup championship game for the second straight year after leading the Western Conference with a 5–1 record. However, they lost that game to the Indiana Fever.

The Lynx went under a few changes in the offseason following the 2024 season. General Manager Clare Duwelius left to become the Executive Vice President and General Manager, for the new women's 3x3 basketball league Unrivaled. Forward Cecilia Zandalasini was selected in the Golden State Valkyries expansion draft. After coming over to Minnesota in a trade at the end of the season, Myisha Hines-Allen signed with the Dallas Wings in February 2025. Assistant Coach Katie Smith left to take an assistant position at her alma mater Ohio State, which allowed the Lynx to hire Eric Thibault and Lindsay Whalen to their staff.

== Draft ==
Round	Pick	Player	Position	Nationality	College/Club	Outcome	Ref.
2	15	Anastasiia Kosu	F	Russia	UMMC Ekaterinburg	Signed rookie contract on April 19; Made opening day roster	
2	24	Dalayah Daniels	F	United States	Washington	Signed rookie contract on April 19; Waived on May 7	
3	37	Aubrey Griffin	G/F	United States	UConn	Rights retained	

== Transactions ==
=== Front office and coaching ===
Date	Details	Ref.
November 11, 2024	Associate head coach, Katie Smith, and General Manager, Clare Duwelius, left Lynx organization	
November 30, 2024	Hired Lindsay Whalen as an assistant coach and Eric Thibault as associate head coach	
June 23, 2025	Glen and Becky Taylor announced their departure from the ownership group of the Minnesota Lynx and the Minnesota Timberwolves	
June 23, 2025	Marc Lore and Alex Rodriguez became the new majority owners of the Lynx and Timberwolves	

=== Trades ===
April
April 13	To Minnesota Lynx Outright 2026 first-round draft pick Extinguished previous right to exchange 2026 first round draft picks with Chicago	To Chicago Sky 2025 No. 11 draft pick
April 14	To Minnesota Lynx Karlie Samuelson	To Washington Mystics 2026 first round pick (Minnesota’s own)
August
August 3	To Minnesota Lynx DiJonai Carrington	To Dallas Wings Diamond Miller; Karlie Samuelson; 2027 second round pick (Minnesota’s own)

=== Free agency ===
==== Re-signed / extensions ====
Player	Date	Notes	Ref.
Natisha Hiedeman	February 1	One-year deal	
Dorka Juhász	May 15	Exercised team option (Fourth-year)	
Diamond Miller	May 15	Exercised team option (Fourth-year)	
Jessica Shepard	June 23	Set as active	

==== Additions ====
Player	Date	Notes	Former Team	Ref.
Marième Badiane	February 1	Training camp contract	Fenerbahçe S.K.	
Grace Berger	February 8	Awarded off waivers	Indiana Fever	
Kiara Leslie	February 10	Training camp contract	Gigantes de Carolina	
Camryn Taylor	February 25	Training camp contract	Esperides Kallitheas	
Camryn Taylor	August 8	7-day contract	Free agent	
Camryn Taylor	August 15	7-day contract	Free agent	
Camryn Taylor	August 22	7-day contract	Free agent	
Camryn Taylor	September 1	Rest of season contract	Free agent	
Christyn Williams	February 26	Training camp contract	Athletes Unlimited	
Ajae Petty	April 16	Training camp contract	Ohio State Buckeyes	
Reigan Richardson	April 16	Training camp contract	Duke Blue Devils	
Anastasiia Kosu	April 19	Rookie contract (2025 draft pick – No. 15)	UMMC Ekaterinburg	
Dalayah Daniels	April 19	Rookie contract (2025 draft pick – No. 24)	Washington Huskies	
Jessica Shepard	April 19	Training camp contract	Athinaikos AS Vurona	
Diamond Johnson	April 24	Training camp contract	Norfolk State Spartans	
Maria Kliundikova	June 6	Rest of season contract	Free agent	
Yvonne Anderson	July 28	7-day contract	Free agent	
Yvonne Anderson	August 4	7-day contract	Free agent	
Jaylyn Sherrod	August 9	Rest of season contract	Free agent	

=== Subtractions / unsigned ===
Player	Date	Reason	New Team	Ref.
Maïa Hirsch	April 10, 2023	Unsigned draft pick (2023 draft pick – No. 12)	N/A – retained rights	
Cecilia Zandalasini	December 6, 2024	Expansion draft	Golden State Valkyries	
Olivia Époupa (Note: Initially was a reserved free agent. However, did not receive qualifying offer from the Lynx prior to February 1 and so became an unrestricted free agent.)	February 1, 2025	Free agency – unrestricted	—	
Myisha Hines-Allen	February 2, 2025	Free agency – unrestricted	Dallas Wings	
Aubrey Griffin	April 14, 2025	Unsigned draft pick (2025 draft pick – No. 37)	N/A – retained rights	
Kiara Leslie	May 5, 2025	Waived	—	
Christyn Williams	May 5, 2025	Waived	—	
Dalayah Daniels	May 7, 2025	Waived	—	
Diamond Johnson	May 7, 2025	Waived	—	
Ajae Petty	May 7, 2025	Waived	—	
Camryn Taylor	May 7, 2025	Waived	—	
Camryn Taylor	August 29, 2025	Released	—	
Dorka Juhász	May 10, 2025	Suspended contract – full season	N/A – retained rights	
Reigan Richardson	May 11, 2025	Waived	—	
Grace Berger	May 14, 2025	Waived	Dallas Wings	
Marième Badiane	June 4, 2025	Waived	—	
Jessica Shepard	June 10, 2025	Suspended contract – temporary	N/A – retained rights	
Alissa Pili	July 12, 2025	Waived	Los Angeles Sparks	
Yvonne Anderson	August 9, 2025	Released	—	

== Roster ==
2025 Minnesota Lynx roster
Players
Coaches

Pos.	No.	Nat.	Name	Height	Weight	DOB	From	Yrs
G/F	6	(Canada)	Carleton, Bridget	6' 2" (1.88m)	177 lb (80kg)	1997-05-22	Iowa State	6
G/F	3	(United States)	Carrington, DiJonai (injured)	5' 11" (1.8m)	175 lb (79kg)	1998-01-08	Baylor	4
F	24	(United States)	Collier, Napheesa (injured) (C)	6' 1" (1.85m)	180 lb (82kg)	1996-09-23	Connecticut	6
G	2	(United States)	Hiedeman, Natisha	5' 8" (1.73m)	132 lb (60kg)	1997-02-10	Marquette	6
C	77	(Russia)	Kliundikova, Maria	6' 4" (1.93m)	185 lb (84kg)	1998-07-16	Russia	2
F	7	(Russia)	Kosu, Anastasiia	6' 1" (1.85m)	190 lb (86kg)	2005-04-21	Russia	R
G	21	(United States)	McBride, Kayla	5' 11" (1.8m)	179 lb (81kg)	1992-06-25	Notre Dame	11
F	15	(Slovenia)	Shepard, Jessica	6' 4" (1.93m)	175 lb (79kg)	1996-09-11	Notre Dame	4
G	0	(United States)	Sherrod, Jaylyn	5' 7" (1.7m)		2001-10-21	Colorado	1
C	8	(Australia)	Smith, Alanna	6' 4" (1.93m)	177 lb (80kg)	1996-09-10	Stanford	6
F	20	(United States)	Taylor, Camryn	6' 2" (1.88m)		2000-03-15	Virginia	R
G	10	(United States)	Williams, Courtney	5' 8" (1.73m)	148 lb (67kg)	1994-05-11	South Florida	9
G/F	–	(United States)	Griffin, Aubrey (injured) (DP)	6' 1" (1.85m)		2001-11-06	Connecticut	–
C	–	(France)	Hirsch, Maïa (DP)	6' 5" (1.96m)		2003-11-13	France	–
C	–	(Hungary)	Juhász, Dorka (S)	6' 5" (1.96m)	201 lb (91kg)	1999-12-18	Connecticut	2

Head coach
(United States) Cheryl Reeve (La Salle)
Assistant coaches
(United States) Eric Thibault (Missouri)
(United States) Rebekkah Brunson (Georgetown)
(United States) Lindsay Whalen (Minnesota)
Athletic trainer
(United States) Chuck Barta (UW–La Crosse)
Assistant trainer
(United States) Brandi BlueArm (Minnesota State)
Strength and conditioning coach
(United States) Andrea Hayden (Missouri Baptist)

Legend

- (C) Team captain
- (DP) Unsigned draft pick
- (FA) Free agent
- (S) Suspended
- Injured

=== Depth ===
Pos.	Starter	Bench
PG	Courtney Williams	Natisha Hiedeman; Jaylyn Sherrod
SG	Kayla McBride	DiJonai Carrington
SF	Bridget Carleton	Anastasiia Kosu
PF	Napheesa Collier	Jessica Shepard; Camryn Taylor
C	Alanna Smith	Maria Kliundikova

== Schedule ==
=== Preseason ===
2025 pre-season game log
Total: 1–1 (Home: 1–0; Road: 0–1)
May: 1–1 (Home: 1–0; Road: 0–1)

Game	Date	Team	Score	High points	High rebounds	High assists	Location Attendance	Record
1	May 6	@ Chicago	L 69–74	Alanna Smith (10)	Alanna Smith (9)	Hiedeman, Williams (5)	Wintrust Arena; 4,688	0–1
2	May 10	Chicago	W 92–87	Napheesa Collier (26)	Jessica Shepard (8)	Jessica Shepard (9)	Target Center; 7,615	1–1

2025 pre-season schedule

=== Regular season ===
2025 game log
Total: 34–10 (Home: 20–2; Road: 14–8)
May: 6–0 (Home: 3–0; Road: 3–0)

Game	Date	Team	Score	High points	High rebounds	High assists	Location Attendance	Record
1	May 16	@ Dallas	W 99–84	Napheesa Collier (34)	Jessica Shepard (8)	Courtney Williams (9)	College Park Center; 6,251	1–0
2	May 18	@ Los Angeles	W 89–75	Napheesa Collier (23)	Jessica Shepard (10)	Courtney Williams (9)	Crypto.com Arena; 11,170	2–0
3	May 21	Dallas	W 85–81	Napheesa Collier (28)	Jessica Shepard (10)	Natisha Hiedeman (8)	Target Center; 12,772	3–0
4	May 23	Connecticut	W 76–70	Napheesa Collier (33)	Napheesa Collier (11)	Jessica Shepard (4)	Target Center; 8,224	4–0
5	May 27	Seattle	W 82–77	Courtney Williams (23)	Napheesa Collier (10)	Napheesa Collier (5)	Target Center; 8,808	5–0
6	May 30	@ Phoenix	W 74–71	Kayla McBride (20)	Jessica Shepard (10)	Courtney Williams (7)	PHX Arena; 9,043	6–0

June : 8–2 (Home: 5–0; Road: 3–2)

Game	Date	Team	Score	High points	High rebounds	High assists	Location Attendance	Record
7	June 1	@ Golden State	W 86–75	Napheesa Collier (24)	Napheesa Collier (11)	Courtney Williams (5)	Chase Center; 18,064	7–0
8	June 3	Phoenix	W 88–65	Napheesa Collier (18)	Napheesa Collier (11)	Kayla McBride (7)	Target Center; 8,772	8–0
9	June 8	@ Dallas	W 81–65	Napheesa Collier (28)	Napheesa Collier (10)	Courtney Williams (8)	College Park Center; 6,162	9–0
10	June 11	@ Seattle	L 84–94	Napheesa Collier (25)	Napheesa Collier (9)	McBride, Williams (6)	Climate Pledge Arena; 9,722	9–1
11	June 14	Los Angeles	W 101–77	Napheesa Collier (32)	Napheesa Collier (8)	Napheesa Collier (6)	Target Center; 10,810	10–1
12	June 17	Las Vegas	W 76–62	Courtney Williams (20)	Alanna Smith (13)	Courtney Williams (5)	Target Center; 8,802	11–1
13	June 21	Los Angeles	W 82–66	Kayla McBride (29)	Kliudikova, Smith (8)	Hiedeman, Williams (6)	Target Center; 8,777	12–1
14	June 24	@ Washington	L 64–68	Alanna Smith (26)	Jessica Shepard (15)	Shepard, Williams (4)	CareFirst Arena; 4,200	12–2
15	June 27	@ Atlanta	W 96–92 (OT)	Napheesa Collier (26)	Alanna Smith (8)	Courtney Williams (8)	Gateway Center Arena; 3,265	13–2
16	June 29	Connecticut	W 102–63	Napheesa Collier (23)	Collier, Williams (9)	Hiedeman, Williams (7)	Target Center; 8,821	14–2

July : 9–3 (Home: 7–1; Road: 2–2)

Game	Date	Team	Score	High points	High rebounds	High assists	Location Attendance	Record
Commissioner's; Cup Final	July 1	Indiana	L 59–74	Alanna Smith (15)	Napheesa Collier (9)	Courtney Williams (4)	Target Center; 12,778	—
17	July 3	Washington	W 92–75	Napheesa Collier (28)	Courtney Williams (6)	Courtney Williams (8)	Target Center; 8,824	15–2
18	July 5	Golden State	W 82–71	Napheesa Collier (22)	Jessica Shepard (10)	Alanna Smith (6)	Target Center; 8,771	16–2
19	July 6	Chicago	W 80–75	Courtney Williams (25)	Courtney Williams (8)	Courtney Williams (6)	Target Center; 8,810	17–2
20	July 9	@ Phoenix	L 71–79	Courtney Williams (21)	Alanna Smith (9)	Courtney Williams (5)	PHX Arena; 10,083	17–3
21	July 10	@ Los Angeles	W 91–82	Natisha Hiedeman (18)	Napheesa Collier (8)	Courtney Williams (7)	Crypto.com Arena; 18,199	18–3
22	July 12	@ Chicago	L 81–87	Napheesa Collier (26)	Collier, Williams (8)	Courtney Williams (8)	Wintrust Arena; 9,025	18–4
23	July 14	@ Chicago	W 91–78	Napheesa Collier (29)	Courtney Williams (8)	Courtney Williams (7)	Wintrust Arena; 8,105	19–4
24	July 16	Phoenix	W 79–66	Kayla McBride (18)	Jessica Shepard (8)	Carleton, McBride, Williams (5)	Target Center; 16,421	20–4
All-Star Game
25	July 22	Chicago	W 91–68	Collier, McBride (19)	Napheesa Collier (8)	Courtney Williams (7)	Target Center; 8,821	21–4
26	July 25	Las Vegas	W 109–78	Napheesa Collier (25)	Jessica Shepard (13)	Courtney Williams (5)	Target Center; 8,810	22–4
27	July 27	Atlanta	L 86–90	Napheesa Collier (32)	Napheesa Collier (8)	Courtney Williams (9)	Target Center; 8,788	22–5
28	July 30	New York	W 100–93	Napheesa Collier (30)	Collier, Williams (9)	Courtney Williams (13)	Target Center; 10,824	23–5

August : 8–3 (Home: 3–1; Road: 5–2)

Game	Date	Team	Score	High points	High rebounds	High assists	Location Attendance	Record
29	August 2	@ Las Vegas	W 111–58	Kayla McBride (24)	Jessica Shepard (14)	Courtney Williams (9)	Michelob Ultra Arena; 10,488	24–5
30	August 5	@ Seattle	W 91–87	Courtney Williams (20)	Jessica Shepard (13)	Kayla McBride (6)	Climate Pledge Arena; 10,468	25–5
31	August 8	Washington	W 80–76	Alanna Smith (25)	Carleton, Shepard (6)	Courtney Williams (5)	Target Center; 8,821	26–5
32	August 10	@ New York	W 83–71	Kayla McBride (18)	Alanna Smith (9)	Smith, Williams (7)	Barclays Center; 17,343	27–5
33	August 16	New York	W 86–80	Courtney Williams (26)	Jessica Shepard (10)	Courtney Williams (5)	Target Center; 10,810	28–5
34	August 19	@ New York	L 75–85	Courtney Williams (17)	Jessica Shepard (10)	Kayla McBride (3)	Barclays Center; 16,864	28–6
35	August 21	@ Atlanta	L 73–75	Bridget Carleton (16)	Jessica Shepard (16)	Courtney Williams (9)	Gateway Center Arena; 3,265	28–7
36	August 22	@ Indiana	W 95–90	Kayla McBride (29)	Jessica Shepard (11)	Jessica Shepard (10)	Gainbridge Fieldhouse; 15,121	29–7
37	August 24	Indiana	W 97–84	Napheesa Collier (32)	Napheesa Collier (9)	Courtney Williams (10)	Target Center; 15,124	30–7
38	August 28	Seattle	L 79–93	Kayla McBride (20)	Napheesa Collier (9)	Courtney Williams (10)	Target Center; 9,810	30–8
39	August 30	@ Connecticut	W 94–70	Carrington, Smith (18)	Napheesa Collier (9)	Kayla McBride (6)	Mohegan Sun Arena; 8,910	31–8

September : 3–2 (Home: 2–0; Road: 1–2)

Game	Date	Team	Score	High points	High rebounds	High assists	Location Attendance	Record
40	September 1	Dallas	W 96–71	Napheesa Collier (25)	Jessica Shepard (8)	Natisha Hiedeman (10)	Target Center; 10,824	32–8
41	September 4	@ Las Vegas	L 87–97	Natisha Hiedeman (22)	Collier, Hiedeman (6)	Kayla McBride (6)	T-Mobile Arena; 14,656	32–9
42	September 6	@ Golden State	W 78–72	Natisha Hiedeman (24)	Jessica Shepard (13)	Courtney Williams (5)	Chase Center; 18,064	33–9
43	September 9	@ Indiana	L 72–83	Jessica Shepard (16)	Kliundikova, Shepard (7)	Courtney Williams (5)	Gainbridge Fieldhouse; 15,012	33–10
44	September 11	Golden State	W 72–53	Natisha Hiedeman (21)	Jessica Shepard (14)	McBride, Williams (4)	Target Center; 8,824	34–10

2025 season schedule

Notes:

- Games highlighted in ██ represent Commissioner's Cup games.

=== Playoffs ===
2025 playoff game log
First round vs. Golden State Valkyries
Won Series 2–0

Game	Date	Team	Score	High points	High rebounds	High assists	Location Attendance	Series
1	September 14	Golden State	W 101–72	Napheesa Collier (20)	Jessica Shepard (8)	Hiedeman, Shepard, Williams (4)	Target Center; 8,821	1–0
2	September 17	@ Golden State	W 75–74	Napheesa Collier (24)	Napheesa Collier (7)	Hiedeman, Williams (7)	SAP Center; 18,543	2–0

Semifinals vs. Phoenix Mercury
Lost series 1–3

Game	Date	Team	Score	High points	High rebounds	High assists	Location Attendance	Series
1	September 21	Phoenix	W 82–69	Courtney Williams (23)	Napheesa Collier (9)	Courtney Williams (7)	Target Center; 10,121	1–0
2	September 23	Phoenix	L 83–89 (OT)	Napheesa Collier (24)	Alanna Smith (9)	Courtney Williams (9)	Target Center; 10,824	1–1
3	September 26	@ Phoenix	L 76–84	Natisha Hiedeman (19)	Collier, Kliundikova (6)	Kayla McBride (5)	PHX Arena; 15,941	1–2
4	September 28	@ Phoenix	L 81–86	Kayla McBride (31)	Alanna Smith (8)	Courtney Williams (6)	PHX Arena; 16,919	1–3

2025 playoff schedule

== Standings ==
#	Team	W	L	PCT	GB	Conf.	Home	Road	Cup
1	yx – Minnesota Lynx	34	10	.773	–	20–4	20–2	14–8	5–1
2	x – Las Vegas Aces	30	14	.682	4	16–8	17–5	13–9	2–4
3	x – Atlanta Dream	30	14	.682	4	15–6	16–6	14–8	3–2
4	x – Phoenix Mercury	27	17	.614	7	13–11	15–7	12–10	4–2
5	x – New York Liberty	27	17	.614	7	15–5	17–5	10–12	4–1
6	cx – Indiana Fever	24	20	.545	10	13–8	13–9	11–11	4–1
7	x – Seattle Storm	23	21	.523	11	12–12	10–12	13–9	4–2
8	x – Golden State Valkyries	23	21	.523	11	9–15	14–8	9–13	3–3
9	e – Los Angeles Sparks	21	23	.477	13	10–14	9–13	12–10	2–4
10	e – Washington Mystics	16	28	.364	18	8–12	10–12	6–16	2–3
11	e – Connecticut Sun	11	33	.250	23	7–14	7–15	4–18	1–4
12	e – Chicago Sky	10	34	.227	24	4–17	6–16	4–18	1–4
13	e – Dallas Wings	10	34	.227	24	4–20	6–16	4–18	1–5

Notes

(#) – League Standing
c – Commissioner's Cup winners
y – Regular Season Champion
x – Clinched playoff berth
e – Eliminated from playoff contention
Source: Overall standings and Commissioner's Cup Standings

== Playoffs ==
First Round: Best-of-3
**1**	**Minnesota Lynx**	**2**
8	Golden State Valkyries	0
4	**Phoenix Mercury**	2
5	New York Liberty	1
2	**Las Vegas Aces**	**2**
7	Seattle Storm	1
3	Atlanta Dream	1
6	**Indiana Fever**	**2**

Semifinals: Best-of-5
1	Minnesota Lynx	1
4	**Phoenix Mercury**	**3**
2	**Las Vegas Aces**	**3**
6	Indiana Fever	2

Finals: Best-of-7
4	Phoenix Mercury	0
2	**Las Vegas Aces**	**4**

- **Bold** – Series winner
- Italic – Team with home-court-advantage

== Statistics ==
Legend
GP	Games played	GS	Games started	MPG	Minutes per game	RPG	Rebounds per game
APG	Assists per game	SPG	Steals per game	BPG	Blocks per game	PPG	Points per game
FG%	Field-goal percentage	3P%	3-point field-goal percentage	FT%	Free-throw percentage	TO	Turnovers per game
PF	Fouls per game		Team leader		League leader

=== Regular season ===
Player	GP	GS	MPG	FG%	3P%	FT%	RPG	APG	SPG	BPG	TO	PPG
Napheesa Collier	33	33	32.8	53.1%	40.3%	90.6%	7.3	3.2	1.6	1.5	2.1	22.9
Kayla McBride	39	39	31.3	41.6%	39.5%	90.5%	2.3	3.5	1.3	0.1	1.7	14.2
Courtney Williams	44	44	28.6	42.8%	38.9%	84.9%	4.9	6.2	1.3	0.3	2.3	13.6
Bridget Carleton	44	44	27.9	40.2%	37.3%	72.0%	3.6	2.0	0.8	0.3	0.8	6.5
Alanna Smith	42	42	26.5	48.5%	32.9%	47.7%	5.1	2.9	1.3	1.9	1.5	9.6
Jessica Shepard	40	12	20.9	63.8%	0.0%	54.4%	7.3	2.6	0.5	0.1	1.5	8.0
Natisha Hiedeman	44	0	18.9	49.2%	37.1%	76.1%	1.9	2.8	0.7	0.2	1.2	9.1
DiJonai Carrington	11	1	16.6	48.5%	50.0%	76.0%	2.1	1.1	1.2	0.4	0.9	8.6
Karlie Samuelson	16	4	14.3	33.3%	35.3%	92.9%	1.3	1.1	0.4	0.1	0.7	3.3
Yvonne Anderson	1	0	12.0	0.0%	0.0%	—	1.0	2.0	2.0	—	—	—
Maria Kliundikova	34	1	11.0	50.0%	32.0%	57.1%	3.0	0.6	0.7	0.8	0.7	4.4
Diamond Miller	25	0	9.7	47.6%	53.8%	84.8%	0.9	0.6	0.3	0.2	0.8	4.1
Alissa Pili	14	0	5.9	45.5%	36.4%	75.0%	1.2	0.2	0.1	—	0.5	1.9
Jaylyn Sherrod	8	0	4.8	37.5%	0.0%	50.0%	0.5	0.3	0.1	—	0.1	1.0
Camryn Taylor	6	0	3.8	14.3%	33.3%	0.0%	1.0	0.2	—	—	0.5	0.5
Anastasiia Kosu	21	0	3.8	44.8%	0.0%	60.0%	0.7	0.2	—	0.2	0.3	1.7
Marième Badiane	3	0	3.7	0.0%	0.0%	—	0.3	—	0.7	—	0.7	—

=== Playoffs ===
Player	GP	GS	MPG	FG%	3P%	FT%	RPG	APG	SPG	BPG	TO	PPG
Kayla McBride	6	6	36.8	46.6%	47.6%	100.0%	3.7	2.7	1.2	0.3	1.2	20.0
Napheesa Collier	5	5	34.8	53.8%	28.0%	71.4%	6.8	2.4	1.0	1.0	2.6	20.6
Courtney Williams	6	6	32.5	44.2%	27.3%	80.0%	5.3	6.0	2.7	0.2	2.8	15.7
Bridget Carleton	6	6	28.5	31.0%	36.8%	100.0%	4.2	1.5	0.7	0.3	0.8	5.0
Alanna Smith	6	6	23.5	44.1%	11.8%	57.1%	5.2	2.0	1.0	1.5	1.5	6.0
Natisha Hiedeman	6	0	20.8	38.3%	15.8%	80.0%	1.7	3.5	0.8	0.3	1.7	7.8
Jessica Shepard	6	1	17.7	44.4%	0.0%	87.5%	5.0	1.8	0.7	—	1.0	5.2
DiJonai Carrington	2	0	12.5	50.0%	57.1%	50.0%	1.0	1.0	0.5	0.5	0.5	8.5
Maria Kliundikova	5	0	10.2	38.9%	0.0%	—	3.6	1.2	0.4	1.0	0.2	2.8
Anastasiia Kosu	3	0	2.3	100.0%	—	—	0.3	0.3	—	—	—	2.0
Jaylyn Sherrod	2	0	2.0	0.0%	—	—	0.5	0.5	—	—	—	—
Camryn Taylor	2	0	2.0	0.0%	—	—	0.5	—	—	—	—	—

== Awards and honors ==
Recipient	Award/Milestone	Date Awarded	Reference
Napheesa Collier	Western Conference Player of the Week	May 28	
Napheesa Collier	Western Conference Player of the Week	June 10	
Napheesa Collier	Western Conference Player of the Month – May	June 4	
Napheesa Collier	Western Conference Player of the Month – June	July 3	
Napheesa Collier	Western Conference Player of the Month – July	August 4	
Napheesa Collier	WNBA All-Star Captain and Starter	June 29	
Napheesa Collier	All-Star Game MVP	July 19	
Napheesa Collier	AP All-WNBA First Team	September 12	
Napheesa Collier	WNBA Most Valuable Player Top 5 Finalist	September 19	
Napheesa Collier	WNBA All-Defensive First Team	October 8	
Napheesa Collier	All-WNBA First Team	October 10	
Kayla McBride	WNBA All-Star Reserve (replacement player)	July 15	
Kayla McBride	Western Conference Player of the Week	August 5	
Cheryl Reeve	WNBA All-Star Head Coach	July 3	
Cheryl Reeve	Coach of the Month – July	August 4	
Alanna Smith	WNBA Defensive Player of the Year	September 18	
Alanna Smith	WNBA All-Defensive First Team	October 8	
Courtney Williams	WNBA All-Star Reserve	July 7	
