= Bree Hall =

American basketball player (born 2003)

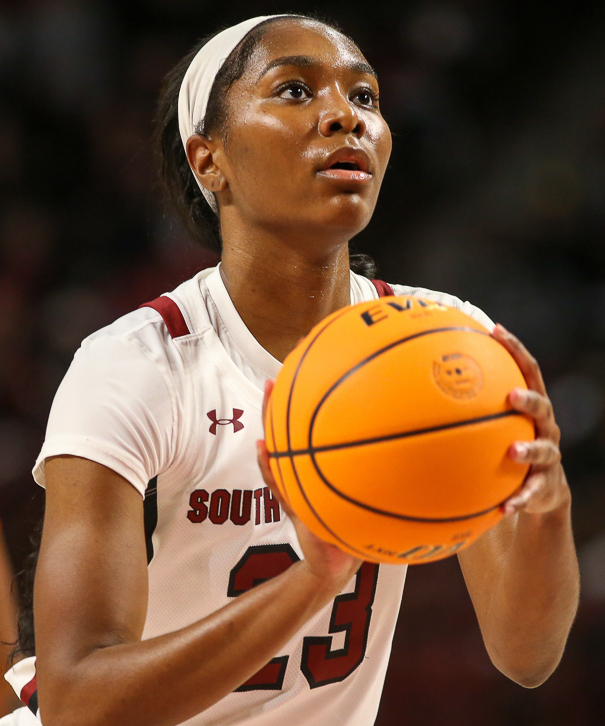
- Hall with South Carolina in 2021

No. 23 – Indiana Fever & Rutronik Stars Keltern
- Position: Guard
- League: WNBA; DBBL

Personal information
- Born: June 28, 2003 (age 23) Dayton, Ohio, U.S.
- Listed height: 6 ft 1 in (1.85 m)
- Listed weight: 161 lb (73 kg)

Career information
- High school: Wayne (Huber Heights, Ohio)
- College: South Carolina (2021–2025)
- WNBA draft: 2025: 2nd round, 20th overall pick
- Drafted by: Indiana Fever
- Playing career: 2025–present

Career history
- 2025: Golden State Valkyries
- 2025–present: Indiana Fever
- 2025: Mainland Pouākai
- 2026–present: Rutronik Stars Keltern

Career highlights
- 2× NCAA champion (2022, 2024); McDonald's All-American (2021); Ohio Ms. Basketball (2021)
- Stats at Basketball Reference

Aubryanna "Bree" Hall (born June 28, 2003) is an American professional basketball player for the Indiana Fever of the Women's National Basketball Association (WNBA) and Athletes Unlimited Pro Basketball. She played college basketball at South Carolina. She was selected 20th overall by the Indiana Fever in the 2025 WNBA draft.

== High school career ==
Hall played basketball for Wayne High School in Huber Heights, Ohio. As a senior, she averaged 25.6 points, 7.1 rebounds and 3.3 steals per game, earning McDonald's All-American and Ohio Ms. Basketball honors. Hall left as Wayne's all-time leading scorer, surpassing the boys' record held by Travis Trice. She received her first college offer from Dayton in eighth grade. Rated a five-star recruit by ESPN, she committed to play college basketball for South Carolina over offers from Kentucky, Mississippi State, North Carolina State, Ohio State, Tennessee, and Texas.

== College career ==
As a freshman at South Carolina, Hall averaged 2.7 points and 1.5 rebounds in 9.2 minutes per game, helping her team win the national championship. In her sophomore season, she became a key bench player, averaging five points and 1.9 rebounds per game, as South Carolina reached the Final Four of the 2023 NCAA tournament. As a junior, Hall entered the starting lineup, replacing Brea Beal.

== Professional career ==
=== Indiana Fever (2025) ===
Hall was drafted 20th in the 2025 WNBA draft by the Indiana Fever. She was waived by the team on May 5, 2025. In September 2025, she re-joined the Fever on a rest-of-season hardship contract following an injury to Chloe Bibby. She appeared in one regular-season game and four postseason games during their playoff run.

=== Golden State Valkyries (2025) ===
On June 18, 2025, Hall signed with the Golden State Valkyries. She made her debut and scored her first WNBA points in an 87–63 win over the Connecticut Sun on June 22. On June 30, Hall was waived by the team. On August 27, Hall signed a seven-day hardship contract with the Valkyries.

=== Athletes Unlimited ===
In September 2025, Hall joined Athletes Unlimited Pro Basketball for its fifth season, expanding her professional experience following her rookie year in the WNBA.

== Career statistics ==
Legend
GP	Games played	GS	Games started	MPG	Minutes per game	RPG	Rebounds per game
APG	Assists per game	SPG	Steals per game	BPG	Blocks per game	PPG	Points per game
TO	Turnovers per game	FG%	Field-goal percentage	3P%	3-point field-goal percentage	FT%	Free-throw percentage
**Bold**	Career best	°	League leader

*	Denotes seasons in which Hall won an NCAA Championship

=== WNBA ===
==== Regular season ====
WNBA regular season statistics
Year	Team	GP	GS	MPG	FG%	3P%	FT%	RPG	APG	SPG	BPG	TO	PPG
2025	Golden State	3	0	4.0	.333	.000	**.333**	.7	.0	.0	.0	1.0	1.0
2025	Indiana	1	0	5.0	.000	—	—	1.0	.0	.0	.0	**.0**	.0
2026	Indiana	**5**	0	**5.4**	**.500**	**.500**	.200	**1.2**	**.2**	.0	.0	**.0**	**3.2**
**Career**	2 years, 2 teams	9	0	4.9	.412	.375	.250	1.0	.1	.0	.0	.3	2.1

==== Playoffs ====
WNBA playoff statistics
Year	Team	GP	GS	MPG	FG%	3P%	FT%	RPG	APG	SPG	BPG	TO	PPG
2025	Indiana	4	0	2.0	.667	.000	.500	.8	.0	.0	.0	.0	1.5
**Career**	1 year, 1 team	4	0	2.0	.667	.000	.500	.8	.0	.0	.0	.0	1.5

=== College ===
NCAA statistics
Year	Team	GP	GS	MPG	FG%	3P%	FT%	RPG	APG	SPG	BPG	TO	PPG
2021–22*	South Carolina	36	0	9.3	.314	.304	.633	1.5	.0	.1	.0	.6	2.7
2022–23	South Carolina	35	0	13.9	.405	.359	.613	1.9	.3	.3	.3	**.5**	5.0
2023–24*	South Carolina	37	37	**26.2**	**.440**	.385	**.700**	2.9	**1.5**	.5	**.5**	1.1	**9.2**
2024–25	South Carolina	**38**	**38**	23.5	38.3	**38.9**	66.7	**3.0**	1.1	**.7**	.2	.6	6.4
**Career**		146	75	18.4	.400	.371	.660	2.3	.7	.4	.3	.7	5.8
