= Austin Kelly =

American basketball coach (born 1989)

Indiana Fever
- Position: Assistant coach
- League: WNBA

Personal information
- Born: March 12, 1989 (age 37) Mableton, Georgia, U.S.
- Listed height: 6 ft 3 in (1.91 m)
- Listed weight: 210 lb (95 kg)

Career information
- High school: South Cobb (Austell, Georgia)
- College: Duke (2007–2010); Georgia Southwestern State (2011–2012)
- Coaching career: 2018–present

Career history

Coaching
- 2018–2019: Georgia Tech; Graduate assistant / assistant scouting coordinator
- 2019–2021: Vanderbilt Commodores; Director of recruiting
- 2021–2023: UT Arlington; Assistant coach / recruiting coordinator
- 2023–2024: Connecticut Sun; Assistant coach
- 2025–present: Indiana Fever; Assistant coach

Austin Kelly (born March 12, 1989) is an American basketball coach. He is an assistant coach for the Indiana Fever of the Women's National Basketball Association (WNBA). He played college football for the Duke Blue Devils from 2007 to 2010; he then played college basketball for the Georgia Southwestern State Hurricanes in 2011.

== Early life ==
Kelly was born March 12, 1989, in Mableton, Georgia. He attended South Cobb High School in Austell, Georgia.

== College career ==
Kelly played college football for the Duke Blue Devils. A wide receiver, he played at Duke for four seasons. In 2007, he recorded 15 receptions for 186 yards and one touchdown. He caught 13 passes for 142 yards in 2008, adding one rush for five yards. He tallied 54 catches for 625 yards and four touchdowns in 2009, and in 2010, he added 47 receptions for 486 yards and four more touchdowns. He was a three-year starter at Duke.

After graduating from Duke University in 2011 with a degree in sociology, Kelly played one season of college basketball for the Georgia Southwestern State Hurricanes. Measuring 6 feet 3 inches (1.91 m) tall and 210 pounds (95 kg), he played guard at Georgia Southwestern State. He played in three games, starting in one, and recorded 8.7 points, 2.3 rebounds, and 2.0 assists per game.

== Coaching career ==
After finishing college, Kelly worked as a high school basketball coach. He was an assistant boys' basketball coach at Kell High School in Marietta, Georgia, and South Cobb High School in Austell.

Kelly began coaching college basketball for the Georgia Tech Yellow Jackets women's basketball team as a graduate assistant and assistant scouting coordinator from 2018 to 2019. He spent 2019 to 2021 as the Vanderbilt Commodores women's basketball director of recruiting under head coach Stephanie White; Kelly would later work as White's assistant on multiple teams in the Women's National Basketball Association (WNBA). From 2021 to 2023, Kelly served as the assistant coach and recruiting coordinator for the UT Arlington Mavericks women's basketball team.

Kelly joined the Connecticut Sun of the WNBA from 2023 to 2024 as an assistant under head coach Stephanie White. When White was named the head coach of the Indiana Fever starting in 2025, Kelly joined her staff with the Fever.

On June 7, 2025, Kelly stepped into the head coaching role for the first time as Indiana Fever head coach Stephanie White missed the team's game against the Chicago Sky for personal reasons. Fever star Caitlin Clark also missed the game due to injury, but the Fever defeated the Sky, 79–52.

Kelly filled in for White as head coach again when personal reasons forced her to miss the Fever's June 19, 2025 game against the Golden State Valkyries. The Valkyries defeated the Fever, 88–77.

== Personal life ==
Kelly is married to fellow Indiana Fever assistant coach Karima Christmas-Kelly, who played basketball in the WNBA for nine years. The couple have a son.
