= Amber Cox =

American sports executive

Indiana Fever
- Positions: Chief Operating Officer and General Manager
- League: WNBA

Amber Cox (born 1972) is a sports executive and previous chief operating officer (COO) and General Manager of the Indiana Fever since October 4, 2024. Before joining the Fever, Cox had various sports positions at William Woods University and Columbia College from the 1990s to 2000s. Cox went on to join the Phoenix Mercury in 2004 and began working as the director of marketing and promotions for the WNBA team. During her tenure with the Mercury, Cox became the team's chief operating officer and president in the 2010s. She also was an interim general manager for the team in 2013.

After leaving the Mercury, Cox was a college basketball commissioner for the Big East Conference in 2013. Years later, Cox went to the Major League Soccer in 2015 and became chief marketing officer for the Houston Dash and the Houston Dynamo. The following year, Cox was selected as the vice president of the New England Black Wolves and Connecticut Sun. While part of the Black Wolves, Cox won the 2017 National Lacrosse League Executive of the Year Award.

== Early life and education ==
In the early 1970s, Cox was raised in Monett, Missouri. Growing up, Cox began to play basketball at the age of five and worked with her family at a greenhouse until she was a teen. For her post-secondary education, Cox was on the women's basketball team at William Woods University from 1992 to 1996. Her 1,283 points with the Owls placed her in the top 15 career points for the university during the late 2010s. For her studies, Cox focused on communications and physical education for her Bachelor of Arts in 1996. A few years later at William Woods, Cox received a Master of Business Administration in 1998. While completing her education, Cox was a trombonist.

== Career ==
While completing her post-secondary education in the 1990s, Cox worked at the Missouri Department of Conservation as an assistant in the forestry department and the Missouri House of Representatives as an intern photographer. During the late 1990s, Cox held additional assistant positions at William Woods coaching basketball and working as a sports information director. At Columbia College, Cox held assistant positions in media relations and sports directorship from 1996 to 2000. While at Columbia, Cox led the media relations for the college's sports teams between 2000 and 2005. During the late 2000s, Cox worked for the Phoenix RoadRunners in the hockey's team marketing department. She later continued her sports information career primarily with the American Midwest Conference before becoming the athletic director of William Woods in 2011.

After becoming part of the Phoenix Mercury in 2004, Cox was the Mercury's director of marketing and promotions until 2010. While with the team during the 2000s, Cox also worked in public relations. Cox began her position as chief operating officer (COO) of the WNBA team in 2010. After becoming president of the team in 2011, Cox was named the interim general manager of the Mercury in August 2013 after Corey Gaines was fired. Cox remained with the Mercury until October 2013.

After her tenure with the Mercury, Cox went to work in college basketball when she became a commissioner for the Big East Conference in late 2013. At the beginning of 2015, Cox moved from basketball to Major League Soccer when she was named chief marketing officer for both the Houston Dash and the Houston Dynamo. In October 2016, Cox became the vice president of both the New England Black Wolves and Connecticut Sun. While with the Black Wolves, Cox received the 2017 National Lacrosse League Executive of the Year Award. Cox continued her soccer career in 2021 when she was selected by the Kansas City NWSL to become their COO. On October 4, 2024 it was announced that the Indiana Fever had hired Cox as their COO and General Manager, replacing the legendary Lin Dunn.

== Honors and personal life ==
In 2012, Cox was named one of the 40 Under 40 by the Phoenix Business Journal. In her personal life, Cox played guitar in the 2000s and 2010s. Cox is married.
