= Natisha Hiedeman =

American basketball player (born 1997)

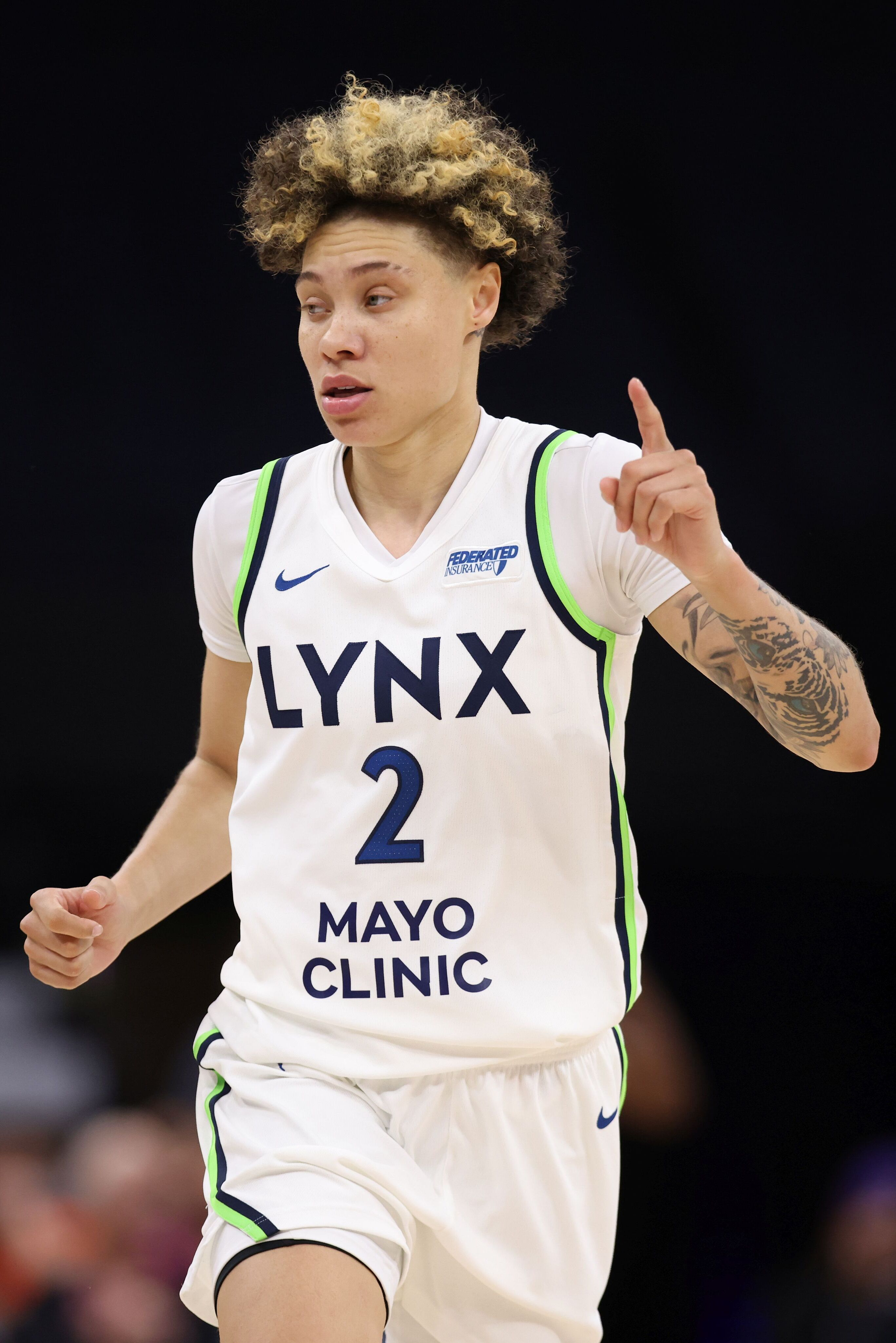
- Hiedeman with the Minnesota Lynx in 2024

No. 2 – Seattle Storm
- Position: Shooting guard
- League: WNBA

Personal information
- Born: February 10, 1997 (age 29) Green Bay, Wisconsin, U.S.
- Listed height: 5 ft 8 in (1.73 m)
- Listed weight: 132 lb (60 kg)

Career information
- High school: Green Bay Southwest (Green Bay, Wisconsin)
- College: Marquette (2015–2019)
- WNBA draft: 2019: 2nd round, 18th overall pick
- Drafted by: Minnesota Lynx
- Playing career: 2019–present

Career history

Playing
- 2019–2023: Connecticut Sun
- 2019–2020: Luleå Basket
- 2020–2021: Maccabi Ironi Ramat Gan
- 2021–2022: Nadezhda Orenburg
- 2022–2023: Maccabi Bnot Ashdod
- 2024–2025: Minnesota Lynx
- 2024–2025: Inner Mongolia
- 2025: Phantom
- 2025: Laces
- 2026–present: Hive
- 2026–present: Seattle Storm

Coaching
- 2023–2024: Penn State (assistant)

Career highlights
- WNBA Commissioner's Cup Champion (2024); Big East Player of the Year (2019); First-team All-Big East (2019); Big East All-Freshman Team (2016)
- Stats at WNBA.com
- Stats at Basketball Reference

Natisha Hiedeman (born February 10, 1997) is an American professional basketball player for the Seattle Storm of the Women's National Basketball Association (WNBA) and for the Hive of Unrivaled. She was drafted with the eighteenth overall pick in the 2019 WNBA draft, which is the highest of any Marquette basketball player in school history (besides Dwyane Wade) and the highest draft pick for the Big East Conference since conference re-alignment.

== Early life ==
Shortly after her birth, Hiedeman had to wear a full-body harness due to a hyperextension in her left leg. As a child, Hiedeman played baseball and was the only girl on her team.

Hiedeman attended Green Bay Southwest High School, where she had the nickname "T-Spoon" after former WNBA star Teresa Weatherspoon. She holds school records in triple jump, high jump, long jump, and 100 meter hurdles. Hiedeman's brother, Sandy Cohen, is a Hapoel Afula B.C. player and also played at Marquette.

== College career ==
Hiedeman was recruited to Marquette after being the leading scorer in the Green Bay Metro area in high school while attending Green Bay Southwest High School. In her first year at Marquette, she was named to the Big East All-Freshman Team. In the 2017–18 season, she was named to the Meyers Drysdale Award Watch List. Hiedeman finished her career as Marquette's third all-time leading scorer, just 27 points shy of the program record. Additionally, she was the first Marquette player to reach 300 made three-pointers and finished sixth on Marquette's all-time assist chart.

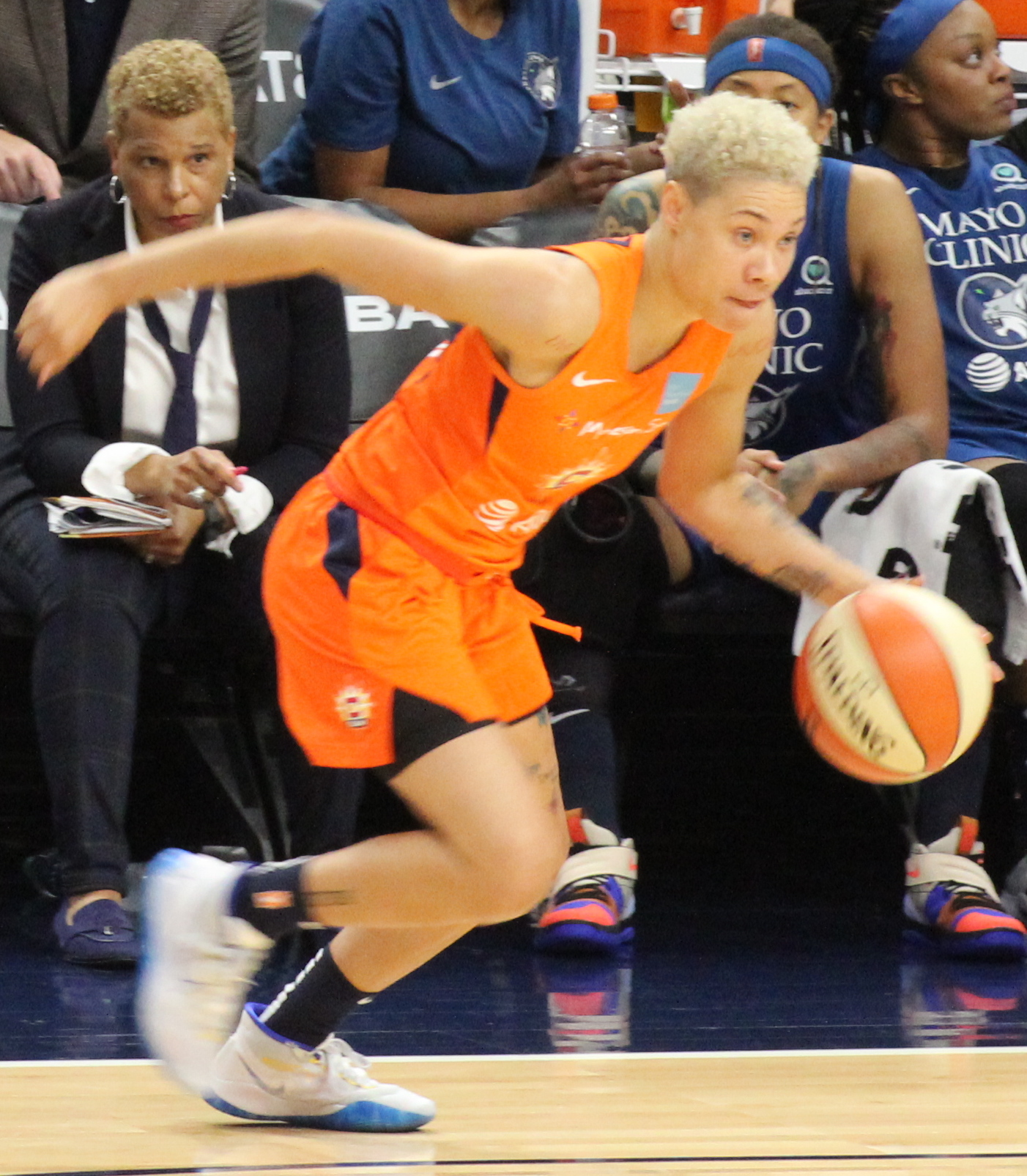
Hiedeman in 2019

== Professional career ==
=== WNBA ===
Hiedeman was drafted 18th overall in the 2019 WNBA draft by the Minnesota Lynx. During the draft, her rights were traded to the Connecticut Sun in exchange for Lexie Brown. She was eventually waived by the Sun. On June 19, 2019, the Atlanta Dream signed Hiedeman as a EuroBasket replacement for Alex Bentley. Hiedeman did not make an appearance for the Dream before Bentley returned to the team. Upon Bentley's return, Hiedeman was waived.

==== Connecticut Sun (2019-2023) ====
Hiedeman was re-signed by the Connecticut Sun after her exit from Atlanta Dream. She made her WNBA debut with the Sun. On July 10, 2019, she scored her first WNBA points. As a rookie, Hiedeman averaged 3.7 points, 1.9 assists, and 1.5 rebounds per game across 20 appearances. In the playoffs, she appeared in seven of the team's eight games, scoring a then career-high eight points on two separate occasions.

During the 2020 season, Hiedeman played in all 22 regular season games, leading the team in points and assists off the bench. She averaged a career-high 6.1 points, 1.9 assists, and 1.9 rebounds per game. Her 45 made field goals on 127 attempts nearly doubled her total from her rookie season.

On January 8, 2021, she signed the qualifying offer to return to the Sun. In the 2021 season, Hiedeman continued to make an impact as a key contributor off the bench. She was one of four Sun players to appear in all 32 regular season games, averaging a career-best 20.1 minutes per game. That season, she set new career highs in scoring with 7.6 points per game, along with 1.8 rebounds and 1.9 assists.

The 2022 season marked a breakout year for Hiedeman as she entered the starting lineup five games into the season and helped lead the Sun to its fourth WNBA Finals appearance in franchise history. She averaged career bests of 9.1 points, 3.3 assists, 1.2 steals, and 25.0 minutes per game during the regular season. On July 24, she tied her career-high with 19 points in a 86–79 win over the Minnesota Lynx, hitting a career-best five three-pointers. In the Finals, Hiedeman recorded a postseason career-high nine assists and played a playoff career-high 34 minutes in Game 3 against the Las Vegas Aces. By the end of the postseason, she ranked 12th all-time in scoring (174), eighth in assists (62), 12th in steals (13), and third in three-point field goals made (34) in Sun playoff history.

On February 3, 2023, Hiedeman signed a two-year contract to remain with the Sun. She started all 40 games of the 2023 season, averaging 8.5 points, a career-high 2.1 rebounds, and 2.7 assists in 26.7 minutes per game. Her standout performance came on July 20 against the Dream, when she scored a season-high 24 points on 8-of-11 shooting, including a career-best 6-of-7 from three-point range, along with three rebounds, three assists, and four steals. Hiedeman became the first player in Sun history and the 10th in WNBA history to record +20 points on six or more three-pointers with four or more steals in a single game.

==== Minnesota Lynx (2024-2025) ====
On January 30, 2024, Hiedeman was traded to the Minnesota Lynx in exchange for Tiffany Mitchell and the 19th pick in the 2024 WNBA draft. During the 2024 season, Hiedeman appeared in all 40 games for the Lynx, averaging 4.9 points, 1.6 rebounds, 2.4 assists, and 0.8 steals in 15.2 minutes per game. She also played in all 12 postseason games, including all five games of the WNBA Finals, where she averaged 5.7 points, 1.3 rebounds, 2.3 assists, and 0.7 steals while shooting 45.5 percent from the field in 14.4 minutes per game. Serving as a backup to starting guard Courtney Williams, Hiedeman adjusted to a new role coming off the bench. She made an impact among the second unit and provided the Lynx with a valuable veteran presence both on and off count, maintaining a strong relationship with Williams in particular.

On February 1, 2025, Hiedeman re-signed with the Lynx. After what was considered a "down" year in 2024, she used the offseason and her growing familiarity with the Lynx's system to deliver a strong comeback. Throughout the 2025 season, Hiedeman provided consistent production off the bench, frequently stepping into the lead guard role when Williams rested or struggled. Appearing in all 44 games as a reserve, she averaged 9.1 points, 2.8 assists, and 1.9 rebounds per game in 18.9 minutes. Her scoring average tied her career high (set in 2022 with the Connecticut Sun), while her field goal percentage (49.2) marked a new career best. In the final five games of the regular season, Hiedeman delivered a standout stretch, averaging 18.6 points, 4.4 assists, 2.8 rebounds, and 2.0 steals per game over 27.2 minutes. She scored over 20 points in four of those five games and ranked seventh among all WNBA players in scoring during that span. On September 11, Hiedeman was named the winner of the Sylvia Fowles Altruism Award, an honor given annually to the Lynx player who best embodies the altruistic traits of kindness, selflessness and overall regard for the well-being of others throughout the community.

==== Seattle Storm (2026-Present) ====
Hiedeman signed with the Seattle Storm during free agency, on April 11, 2026. By the All Star Break, Hiedeman had started in all 29 games for the Storm, posting career highs in minutes played, points scored, rebounds, assists, and steals per game. On 07/28/2026, Hiedeman scored a career high 33 points against the Indiana Fever.

=== International ===
In 2020, Hiedeman was signed by the Israeli Female Basketball Premier League champions Maccabi Ironi Ramat Gan.

Hiedeman played for Inner Mongolia in the Women's Chinese Basketball Association (WCBA) from November 2024 to January 2025.

=== Unrivaled ===
On January 17, 2025, Phantom signed Hiedeman to a relief player contract due to Marina Mabrey sustaining a right calf injury in the pre-season. And on January 27, she was reassigned to the Laces, due to Alyssa Thomas and Jackie Young being unavailable. She rejoined Phantom from March 3–8 due to Sabrina Ionescu's exit from the league due to Ionescu's previously planned Asia tour with Nike.

On November 5, 2025, it was announced that Hiedeman had been drafted by Hive for the 2026 Unrivaled season.

== Coaching career ==
In October 2022, Hiedeman joined her former collegiate coach Carolyn Kieger at Penn State as the Director of Player Development. Hiedeman was promoted to assistant coach for Penn State in August 2023.

== Career statistics ==
Legend
GP	Games played	GS	Games started	MPG	Minutes per game	RPG	Rebounds per game
APG	Assists per game	SPG	Steals per game	BPG	Blocks per game	PPG	Points per game
TO	Turnovers per game	FG%	Field-goal percentage	3P%	3-point field-goal percentage	FT%	Free-throw percentage
**Bold**	Career best	°	League leader

=== WNBA ===
==== Regular season ====
Stats current through end of 2026 regular season

WNBA regular season statistics
Year	Team	GP	GS	MPG	FG%	3P%	FT%	RPG	APG	SPG	BPG	TO	PPG
2019	Connecticut	20	0	10.3	.414	**.464**	.500	1.5	1.9	0.4	0.1	**0.7**	3.7
2020	Connecticut	22	4	18.5	.354	.359	.700	1.9	1.9	0.4	0.0	1.1	6.1
2021	Connecticut	32	5	20.1	.400	.398	.700	1.9	1.9	0.8	**0.2**	0.9	7.6
2022	Connecticut	36	31	25.0	.431	.411	.800	1.8	3.3	**1.2**	0.1	1.3	9.1
2023	Connecticut	**40**°	**40**°	26.7	.392	.366	.739	2.1	2.7	0.9	0.1	1.4	8.5
2024	Minnesota	**40**°	0	15.2	.380	.280	.735	1.6	2.4	0.8	0.2	1.1	4.9
2025	Minnesota	44	0	18.9	.492	.371	.761	1.9	2.8	0.7	0.2	1.2	9.1
2026	Seattle	40	40	**30.0**	**.436**	.324	**.860**	**2.5**	**5.0**	1.1	0.1	2.3	**14.7**
**Career**	8 years, 3 teams	274	120	21.4	.422	.365	.759	1.9	2.8	0.8	0.1	1.3	8.4

==== Playoffs ====
WNBA playoff statistics
Year	Team	GP	GS	MPG	FG%	3P%	FT%	RPG	APG	SPG	BPG	TO	PPG
2019	Connecticut	7	0	5.0	**.600**	**.667**	**1.000**	0.6	0.7	0.0	0.0	**0.0**	2.6
2020	Connecticut	7	0	7.7	.538	.625	.833	0.7	1.3	0.3	0.1	0.6	3.4
2021	Connecticut	4	0	18.0	.500	.600	.714	0.8	3.0	**0.8**	**0.5**	0.5	**9.0**
2022	Connecticut	**12**	**12**	**26.2**	.419	.444	.769	**2.1**	**3.0**	0.7	0.3	1.0	8.2
2023	Connecticut	7	7	22.0	.310	.316	.750	1.9	2.3	0.1	0.1	0.6	5.4
2024	Minnesota	**12**°	0	14.3	.455	.222	.933	1.3	2.3	0.7	0.1	0.9	5.7
2025	Minnesota	6	0	20.8	.383	.158	.800	1.7	**3.5**	0.8	0.3	1.7	7.8
**Career**	7 years, 2 teams	55	19	16.8	.422	.388	.820	1.4	2.3	0.5	0.2	0.8	6.0

=== College ===
NCAA statistics
Year	Team	GP	Points	FG%	3P%	FT%	RPG	APG	SPG	BPG	PPG
2015–16	Marquette	30	411	39.3%	33.7%	69.1%	4.2	2.9	**2.2**	0.1	13.7
2016–17	Marquette	32	444	41.4%	36.6%	**74.1%**	5.1	3.5	1.5	0.5	13.9
2017–18	Marquette	33	441	39.8%	33.3%	67.3%	3.6	3.0	1.9	0.5	13.4
2018–19	Marquette	**35**	**617**	**43.8%**	**39.1%**	70.3%	**6.1**	**4.5**	2.0	**0.5**	**17.6**
**Career**		130	1913	41.3%	35.8%	70.2%	4.8	3.5	1.9	0.4	14.7

== Personal life ==
Hiedeman is a lesbian. In September 2021, Hiedeman announced her engagement to former Connecticut Sun player Jasmine Thomas.

Hiedeman co-hosts a Twitch channel, StudBudz, with her former Lynx teammate Courtney Williams. Their channel gained popularity at the 2025 WNBA All-Star Game, when they live streamed behind-the-scenes happenings during the whole weekend, including the game itself, in which Williams was one of the players. Since then, they have appeared on the cover of Slam and done a feature and photo shoot for Vogue.

Hiedeman began hosting a running club in Seattle, named "Run Budz", at Green Lake Park in 2026.
