= 2025 WNBA Finals =

Championship series of the 2025 WNBA season

Team	Coach	Wins
Las Vegas Aces	Becky Hammon	4
Phoenix Mercury	Nate Tibbetts	0
- Dates: October 3 – 10
- MVP: A'ja Wilson
- Eastern finals: Las Vegas Aces defeated Indiana Fever 3–2 (Note: the semifinal rounds as of 2016 were not divided by conference)
- Western finals: Phoenix Mercury defeated Minnesota Lynx 3–1

The 2025 WNBA Finals, officially the WNBA Finals 2025 presented by YouTube TV for sponsorship reasons, was the best-of-seven championship series for the 2025 season of the Women's National Basketball Association (WNBA). This was the first year that the league used the best-of-seven format, after using a best-of-five format since 2005.

The Finals featured the second-seeded Las Vegas Aces and the fourth-seeded Phoenix Mercury, beginning on October 3 and ending on October 10. This was the first time since the 2021 WNBA Finals that the first-seed did not advance to the Finals. It was Las Vegas' third Finals appearance in four years, and Phoenix's first since 2021. The Aces defeated the Mercury in a sweep to win their third championship in four years and cement themselves as a dynasty. A'ja Wilson was named Finals MVP, winning the award for the second time and becoming the first player to be named Finals MVP, league MVP, and Defensive Player of the Year in the same season.

== Road to the Finals ==
=== Standings ===
#	Team	W	L	PCT	GB	Conf.	Home	Road	Cup
1	**yx** – Minnesota Lynx	34	10	.773	–	20–4	20–2	14–8	5–1
2	**x** – Las Vegas Aces	30	14	.682	4	16–8	17–5	13–9	2–4
3	**x** – Atlanta Dream	30	14	.682	4	15–6	16–6	14–8	3–2
4	**x** – Phoenix Mercury	27	17	.614	7	13–11	15–7	12–10	4–2
5	**x** – New York Liberty	27	17	.614	7	15–5	17–5	10–12	4–1
6	**cx** – Indiana Fever	24	20	.545	10	13–8	13–9	11–11	4–1
7	**x** – Seattle Storm	23	21	.523	11	12–12	10–12	13–9	4–2
8	**x** – Golden State Valkyries	23	21	.523	11	9–15	14–8	9–13	3–3
9	**e** – Los Angeles Sparks	21	23	.477	13	10–14	9–13	12–10	2–4
10	**e** – Washington Mystics	16	28	.364	18	8–12	10–12	6–16	2–3
11	**e** – Connecticut Sun	11	33	.250	23	7–14	7–15	4–18	1–4
12	**e** – Chicago Sky	10	34	.227	24	4–17	6–16	4–18	1–4
13	**e** – Dallas Wings	10	34	.227	24	4–20	6–16	4–18	1–5

Notes

(#) – League Standing
c – Commissioner's Cup winners
y – Regular Season Champion
x – Clinched playoff berth
e – Eliminated from playoff contention
Source: Overall standings and Commissioner's Cup Standings

=== Playoffs ===
First Round: Best-of-3
**1**	**Minnesota Lynx**	**2**
8	Golden State Valkyries	0
4	**Phoenix Mercury**	2
5	New York Liberty	1
2	**Las Vegas Aces**	**2**
7	Seattle Storm	1
3	Atlanta Dream	1
6	**Indiana Fever**	**2**

Semifinals: Best-of-5
1	Minnesota Lynx	1
4	**Phoenix Mercury**	**3**
2	**Las Vegas Aces**	**3**
6	Indiana Fever	2

Finals: Best-of-7
4	Phoenix Mercury	0
2	**Las Vegas Aces**	**4**

- **Bold** – Series winner
- Italic – Team with home-court-advantage

The first round of the WNBA playoffs consists of a best-of-three series, with the following matchups: No. 1 vs. No. 8, No. 2 vs. No. 7, No. 3 vs. No. 6, and No. 4 vs. No. 5. The higher seed in the first round had home-court advantage in Games 1 and, if necessary, 3.

In the semifinals of the postseason, a best-of-five series, the higher seed hosted Games 1, 2 and, if necessary, 5. Additionally, the WNBA Finals was a best-of-seven format for the first time in the league's history. Games 1 and 2, as well as Games 5 and 7, if necessary, was hosted by the higher seed.

== Summary ==
The Finals was the first since 2020 where both teams were from the same conference.

The Las Vegas Aces qualified for the playoffs as the second-seed after winning a tiebreaker with the Atlanta Dream. They defeated the seventh-seed Seattle Storm in the first round and the Indiana Fever in the semifinals to reach the Finals, with both series going the maximum number of games.

The Phoenix Mercury qualified for the playoffs as the fourth-seed after winning a tiebreaker with the New York Liberty. The two teams faced each other in the first round, and the Mercury defeated the defending champions in three games. They then defeated top-seed Minnesota Lynx in four games to reach the Finals. They are the lowest seed to reach the Finals since the 2021 Chicago Sky reached as a sixth-seed. They are also just the sixth two-seed to qualify for the Finals.

The two Western Conference foes met four times during the regular season, with the Aces winning three of the four games. The most recent meeting was on August 21 where the Aces won 83–61.

==== Game 1 ====
Game one of the Finals started as a close affair with the Aces responding to an early Mercury lead. The first quarter ended tied at 21. Both teams continued to go back-and-forth in the second quarter but Phoenix came out on top 29–24. Kahleah Copper scored 19 points in the first half, and broke the WNBA record for most three-pointers in a half with five. The third quarter continued to be close, and the Aces won 22–21, to cut the Mercury's lead to four points heading into the fourth quarter. A'ja Wilson scored 12 points over the final 14 minutes to lead the Aces' comeback. Alyssa Thomas missed two free-throws with 24.6 seconds left, while Jackie Young made two free-throws with 13.5 seconds left. Satou Sabally couldn't sink a long three-point attempt with two seconds left to leave the Aces with a 22–15 fourth quarter victory. Their seven point quarter win meant they won the game by three points. The game was close throughout, with 12 lead changes and nine ties.

The Aces had four players score in double-figures. They were jointly led by Dana Evans and Wilson, who both scored 21 points. Evans' points all came off the bench. Jewell Loyd scored 18 points, also from the bench, and Young scored 10. Chelsea Gray recorded 10 assists and Wilson completed her third double-double of the playoffs by adding 10 rebounds. The Mercury had five players in double-digits and were led by Copper who scored 21. Sabally scored 19 points, Thomas added 15, Monique Akoa Makani scored 11, and DeWanna Bonner added 10 off the bench. Thomas recorded her fourth double-double of the playoffs by adding 10 rebounds. The Aces' bench outscored the Mercury's 41–16.

ESPN

October 3
8 PM ET

Box Score

Phoenix Mercury 86, Las Vegas Aces 89
Scoring by quarter: 21–21, 29–24, 21–22, 15–22
Pts: Kahleah Copper 21; Rebs: Alyssa Thomas 10; Asts: Alyssa Thomas 9	Pts: Evans, Wilson 21; Rebs: A'ja Wilson 10; Asts: Chelsea Gray 10
Las Vegas leads series, 1–0

Michelob Ultra Arena
Attendance: 10,266
Referees: Eric Brewton
Randy Richardson
Jenna Reneau

==== Game 2 ====
Game two began as close as game one had been with the teams going back and forth. It was a high-scoring quarter, which the Mercury won 27–24. The Aces' improved their defensive play during the second quarter and limited the Mercury to just ten points. The Aces won the quarter 22–10 and took a nine-point lead into halftime. Coming out of the half, both teams played well on offense and scored a total of fifty-four points in the quarter. Las Vegas prevailed 30–24 to expand their lead to fifteen points. The fourth quarter was lower scoring, finishing 17–15 in favor of the Mercury. The result didn't put much of a dent in the Aces lead, and Las Vegas took the game by thirteen points. They won both home games to go up in the series two games to zero.

The Aces had three players score in double-figures and were led by Jackie Young who scored thirty-two points, to include setting a WNBA Finals record for most points in a quarter (twenty-one in the 3rd quarter). A'ja Wilson scored twenty-eight points, and Chelsea Gray added ten points. The Mercury also had three players score in double-digits and were led by Kahleah Copper with twenty-three points. Satou Sabally scored twenty-two points, and Alyssa Thomas added ten points. Natasha Mack reached double figures in rebounds with ten. Chelsea Gray recorded a double-double by adding ten assists to go with her ten points. A'ja Wilson also recorded her fourth double-double of the playoffs by grabbing fourteen assists.

ABC

October 5
3 PM ET

Box Score

Phoenix Mercury 78, Las Vegas Aces 91
Scoring by quarter: 27–24, 10–22, 24–30, 17–15
Pts: Kahleah Copper 23; Rebs: Natasha Mack 10; Asts: Monique Akoa Makani 7	Pts: Jackie Young 32; Rebs: A'ja Wilson 14; Asts: Chelsea Gray 10
Las Vegas leads series, 2–0

Michelob Ultra Arena
Attendance: 10,404
Referees: Angelica Suffren
Maj Forsberg
Isaac Barnett
Kevin Fahy

==== Game 3 ====
The first quarter was a quarter of runs with the Aces going on a 17–0 run which the Mercury followed with a 13–0 run. The quarter ended 26–23 in favor of the Aces. The Aces continued their strong play and won the second quarter 29–20 to take a twelve point lead into halftime. They came out of the break well and won the third quarter 21–16 and extended their lead to seventeen points heading into the fourth. However, Phoenix fought back and close the gap to just one point with 3:06 left after Kahleah Copper made a three-pointer. With under two minutes there were two ties, but A'ja Wilson made a turnaround jumper with 0.3 seconds left to seal the game. Phoenix won the fourth quarter 29–14, but lost the game by two points. Las Vegas now holds a three games to zero lead, and will need to win just one more game to take the title.

The Aces had four players score in double-figures and were led by A'ja Wilson who scored thirty-four points. Jackie Young added twenty-one points, Jewell Loyd scored sixteen off the bench, and Chelsea Gray added eleven points. Wilson recorded her fifth double-double in this years playoffs, and third straight in the Finals, by adding fourteen rebounds. The Mercury had four players score in double-digits and were led by DeWanna Bonner who scored twenty-five points from the bench. Satou Sabally scored twenty-four points, Kahleah Copper added seventeen, and Alyssa Thomas scored fourteen points. The Mercury had two players record double-doubles in the game. Bonner added ten rebounds to earn one, and Alyssa Thomas earned the other with twelve rebounds. Thomas finished one assist shy of a triple double.

ESPN

October 8
8 PM ET

Box Score

Las Vegas Aces 90, Phoenix Mercury 88
Scoring by quarter: 26–23, 29–20, 21–16, 14–29
Pts: A'ja Wilson 34; Rebs: A'ja Wilson 14; Asts: Jackie Young 9	Pts: DeWanna Bonner 25; Rebs: Alyssa Thomas 12; Asts: Alyssa Thomas 9
Las Vegas leads series, 3–0

Mortgage Matchup Center
Attendance: 17,071
Referees: Fatou Cissoko-Stephens
Tiara Cruse
Amy Bonner

==== Game 4 ====
The Aces started game four strongly, winning the first quarter 30–21. They continued their dominance into the second quarter, where they won the quarter 24–17. They would take a sixteen point lead into halftime. They extended the lead to twenty in the third quarter, but Phoenix won the quarter 24–22 to cut the lead to fourteen points heading into the final quarter. The Mercury started the quarter on an 8–0 run to cut the deficit to 76–70. However, the Aces did not allow the game to get any closer than that. Phoenix won the final frame 24–21 but it was not nearly enough. The Aces won the game by eleven points and finished the first ever best-of-seven series with a four games to zero sweep.

The Aces had six players finish in double-figures and were led by Finals MVP A'ja Wilson who scored thirty-one points. Wilson only made seven field goals, but converted seventeen of her nineteen free throws. Jackie Young and Chelsea Gray each added eighteen points, Jewell Loyd had twelve points and Dana Evans scored ten points. The Mercury had five players finish in double-digits and they were led by Kahleah Copper with thirty points. Alyssa Thomas scored seventeen points, and DeWanna Bonner, Monique Akoa Makani, and Kalani Brown all scored ten points. Bonner recorded her second straight double-double by adding ten rebounds. Alyssa Thomas recorded her sixth double-double and second triple-double of the playoffs by adding twelve rebounds and ten assists.

ESPN

October 10
8 PM ET

Box Score

Las Vegas Aces 97, Phoenix Mercury 86
Scoring by quarter: 30–21, 24–17, 22–24, 21–24
Pts: A'ja Wilson 31; Rebs: A'ja Wilson 9 Asts: Jackie Young 8	Pts: Kahleah Copper 30; Rebs: Alyssa Thomas 12; Asts: Alyssa Thomas 10
Las Vegas wins series, 4–0

Mortgage Matchup Center
Attendance: 17,071
Referees: Roy Gulbeyan
Gina Cross
Tim Greene
Jeff Wooten

Regular-season series
Las Vegas won 3–1 in the regular-season series

June 15, 2025

Report

Phoenix Mercury 76, Las Vegas Aces 70

Michelob Ultra Arena

June 29, 2025

Report

Las Vegas Aces 84, Phoenix Mercury 81

PHX Arena

August 15, 2025

Report

Las Vegas Aces 86, Phoenix Mercury 83

PHX Arena

August 21, 2025

Report

Phoenix Mercury 61, Las Vegas Aces 83

Michelob Ultra Arena

== Team rosters ==
2025 Phoenix Mercury roster
Players
Coaches

Pos.	No.	Nat.	Name	Height	Weight	DOB	From	Yrs
G	8	(Cameroon)	Akoa Makani, Monique	5' 11" (1.8m)		2001-02-04	Cameroon	R
G/F	14	(North Macedonia)	Bonner, DeWanna	6' 4" (1.93m)	140 lb (64kg)	1987-08-21	Auburn	15
C	21	(United States)	Brown, Kalani	6' 7" (2.01m)	245 lb (111kg)	1997-03-21	Baylor	5
G/F	2	(United States)	Copper, Kahleah	6' 1" (1.85m)	165 lb (75kg)	1994-08-28	Rutgers	9
G	1	(United States)	Held, Lexi	5' 10" (1.78m)	150 lb (68kg)	1999-12-28	DePaul	R
G	9	(Latvia)	Laksa, Kitija	6' 1" (1.85m)	155 lb (70kg)	1996-05-21	South Florida	R
F	4	(United States)	Mack, Natasha	6' 4" (1.93m)	182 lb (83kg)	1997-11-03	Oklahoma State	2
F	0	(Germany)	Sabally, Satou (injured)	6' 4" (1.93m)	175 lb (79kg)	1998-04-25	Oregon	5
F	25	(United States)	Thomas, Alyssa	6' 2" (1.88m)	203 lb (92kg)	1992-04-12	Maryland	11
F	24	(United States)	Westbeld, Kathryn	6' 3" (1.91m)		1996-01-29	Notre Dame	R
G	33	(Australia)	Whitcomb, Sami	5' 10" (1.78m)	149 lb (68kg)	1988-07-20	Washington	8
G	23	(United States)	Williams, Kiana	5' 7" (1.7m)	140 lb (64kg)	1999-04-09	Stanford	3
G	–	(United States)	Ayrault, Julia (S)	6' 2" (1.88m)			Michigan State	–
G	—	(Sweden)	Lundquist, Klara (S)	5' 8" (1.73m)		1999-08-28	Sweden	–
G	–	(Spain)	Pueyo, Helena (S)	6' 0" (1.83m)		2001-02-13	Arizona	–

Head coach
(United States) Nate Tibbetts (South Dakota)
Assistant coaches
(United States) Michael Joiner (Florida State)
(United States) Kristi Toliver (Maryland)
(United States) Megan Vogel (South Dakota State)
Athletic trainer
(United States) Hannah Wengertsman (Boston University)
Strength and conditioning coach
(United States) Annalise Pickrel (Michigan State)

Legend

- (C) Team captain
- (DP) Unsigned draft pick
- (FA) Free agent
- (S) Suspended
- Injured

=== Depth ===
Pos.	Starter	Bench
PG	Monique Akoa Makani
SG	Kahleah Copper	Lexi Held; Sami Whitcomb
SF	Satou Sabally	Kitija Laksa
PF	Alyssa Thomas	Kathryn Westbeld
C	Natasha Mack	Kalani Brown

2025 Las Vegas Aces roster
Players
Coaches

Pos.	No.	Nat.	Name	Height	Weight	DOB	From	Yrs
F	1	(United States)	Bell, Kierstan	6' 1" (1.85m)	176 lb (80kg)	2000-03-16	Florida Gulf Coast	3
G	11	(United States)	Evans, Dana	5' 6" (1.68m)	145 lb (66kg)	1998-08-01	Louisville	4
G	12	(United States)	Gray, Chelsea	5' 11" (1.8m)	170 lb (77kg)	1992-10-08	Duke	10
C	17	(Spain)	Gustafson, Megan	6' 4" (1.93m)	195 lb (88kg)	1996-12-13	Iowa	6
G	24	(United States)	Loyd, Jewell	5' 11" (1.8m)	175 lb (79kg)	1993-10-05	Notre Dame	10
G	13	(United States)	Nye, Aaliyah	6' 0" (1.83m)		2002-08-14	Alabama	R
F	32	(United States)	Parker-Tyus, Cheyenne	6' 4" (1.93m)	193 lb (88kg)	1992-08-22	Middle Tennessee	10
F	3	(United States)	Smith, NaLyssa	6' 4" (1.93m)	185 lb (84kg)	2000-08-08	Baylor	3
C	41	(United States)	Stokes, Kiah	6' 3" (1.91m)	191 lb (87kg)	1993-03-30	Connecticut	9
C	22	(United States)	Wilson, A'ja	6' 4" (1.93m)	195 lb (88kg)	1996-08-08	South Carolina	7
G	0	(United States)	Young, Jackie	6' 0" (1.83m)	165 lb (75kg)	1997-09-16	Notre Dame	6

Head coach
(United States) Becky Hammon (Colorado State)
Assistant coaches
(United States) Tyrone Ellis (Southern Nazarene)
(United States) Larry Lewis (Morehouse)
(United States) Charlene Thomas-Swinson (Auburn)
Player development
(United States) John Lucas III (Oklahoma State)
Athletic trainer
(United States) Bryson Creer (BYU)

Legend

- (C) Team captain
- (DP) Unsigned draft pick
- (FA) Free agent
- (S) Suspended
- Injured

=== Depth chart ===
Pos.	Starter	Bench
PG	Chelsea Gray	Dana Evans
SG	Kierstan Bell	Jewell Loyd
SF	Jackie Young	Aaliyah Nye
PF	A'ja Wilson	Cheyenne Parker-Tyus
C	NaLyssa Smith	Kiah Stokes; Megan Gustafson
