= Westbeld =

Westbeld is a surname. Notable people with the surname include:

- Kathryn Westbeld (born 1996), American basketball player
- Maddy Westbeld (born 2002), American basketball player
