= Kitija Laksa =

Latvian basketball player

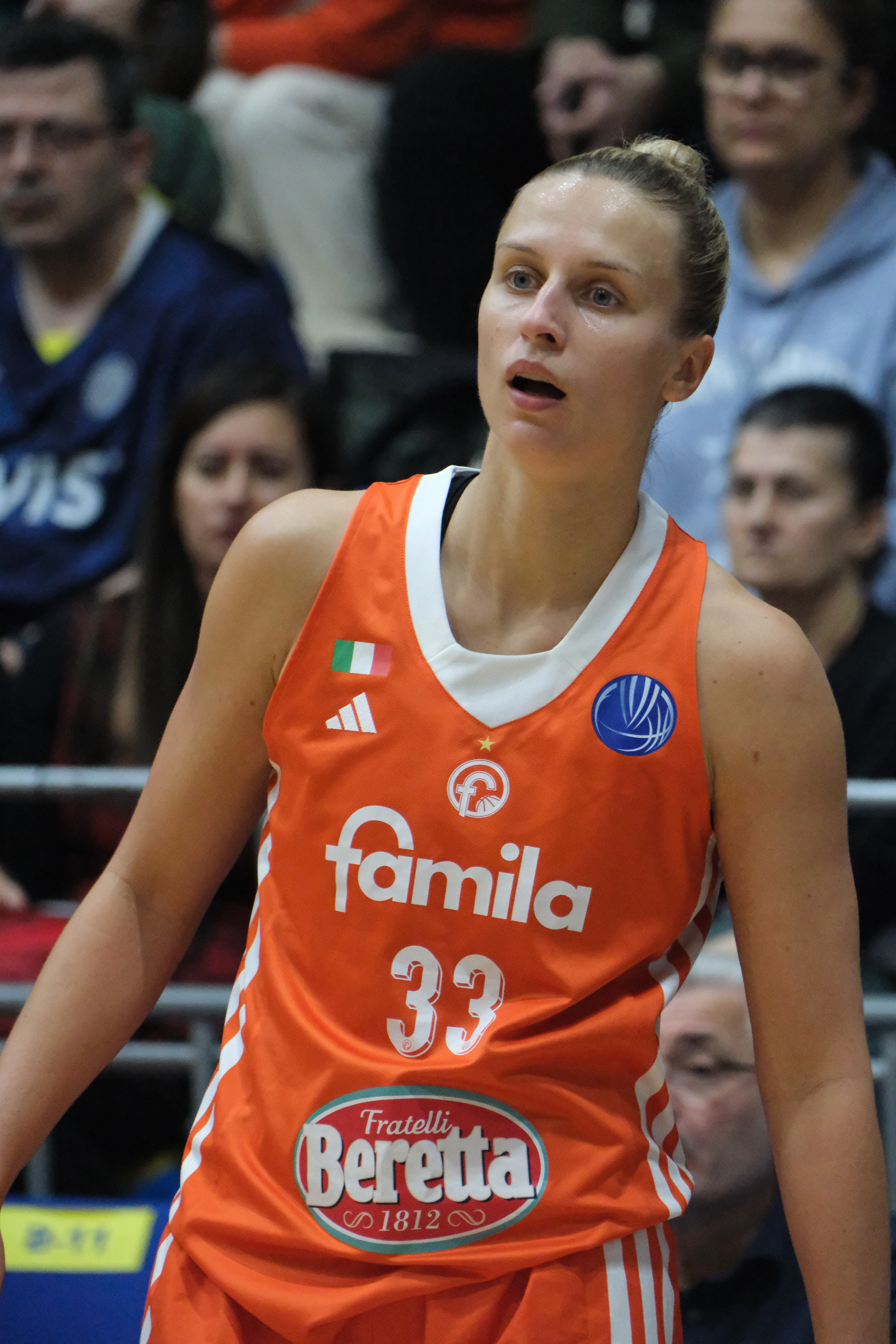

Dallas Wings
- Position: Small forward
- League: WNBA

Personal information
- Born: 21 May 1996 (age 30) Riga, Latvia
- Listed height: 6 ft 1 in (1.85 m)
- Listed weight: 155 lb (70 kg)

Career information
- High school: Riga French Lycée (Riga, Latvia)
- College: South Florida (2015–2019)
- WNBA draft: 2020: 1st round, 11th overall pick
- Drafted by: Seattle Storm
- Playing career: 2019–present

Career history
- 2019–2023: TTT Riga
- 2023–2024: Fenerbahçe
- 2024–2026: PF Schio
- 2025: Phoenix Mercury
- 2026: Toronto Tempo
- 2026–present: Dallas Wings

Career highlights
- AAC Freshman of the year (2016); AAC All-Freshman Team (2016); EuroLeague champion (2024); FIBA Europe SuperCup Women champion (2023); Turkish Cup winner (2024); Triple Crown (2024); Serie A champion (2025, 2026); Serie A Finals MVP (2026)
- Stats at Basketball Reference

Kitija Laksa (born 21 May 1996) is a Latvian professional basketball player for the Dallas Wings of the Women's National Basketball Association (WNBA). She previously played for Fenerbahçe of the Women's Basketball Super League, EuroLeague Women and the Latvian national team.

== Playing career ==
Laksa played for the American collegiate team South Florida Bulls. She suffered a knee injury in November 2018 and missed the rest of her senior season. Instead of returning for a fifth year, Laksa signed with Latvian professional team TTT Riga in July 2019.

Laksa was drafted in the first round, 11th overall, by the Seattle Storm in the 2020 WNBA draft. She signed a contract with the Storm on 25 April 2020, but did not play at all during the 2020 season and she was waived by the team on 13 May 2021.

Two years later on 28 February 2023, Laksa signed a contract with a Dallas Wings but was waived on May 10 before playing a game for them.

On 12 February 2025, she signed a contract with the Phoenix Mercury.

On 21 May 2025, five years after being drafted, Laksa finally made her WNBA debut in a 89 - 86 win over the Los Angeles Sparks where she recorded 9 points, 3 rebounds, 4 assists and 2 steals in 23 minutes off the bench.

On 3 April 2026, she was drafted 21st overall by the Toronto Tempo (from the Mercury) in the 2026 WNBA expansion draft becoming the first Latvian-born player to be drafted from an expansion draft from either the WNBA or the NBA. However, she was not part of the opening day roster that was announced on May 7, 2026.

On August 25, 2026, the Dallas Wings signed Laksa to a rest-of-season contract. Wings head coach Jose Fernandez was Laksa's coach at the University of South Florida.

== Career statistics ==
Legend
GP	Games played	GS	Games started	MPG	Minutes per game	RPG	Rebounds per game
APG	Assists per game	SPG	Steals per game	BPG	Blocks per game	PPG	Points per game
TO	Turnovers per game	FG%	Field-goal percentage	3P%	3-point field-goal percentage	FT%	Free-throw percentage
**Bold**	Career best	°	League leader

=== WNBA ===
==== Regular season ====
Stats current through end of 2025 season

WNBA regular season statistics
Year	Team	GP	GS	MPG	FG%	3P%	FT%	RPG	APG	SPG	BPG	TO	PPG
2025	Phoenix	33	5	19.0	.367	.317	.813	1.2	0.6	0.4	0.2	0.6	5.9
**Career**	1 year, 1 team	33	5	19.0	.367	.317	.813	1.2	0.6	0.4	0.2	0.6	5.9

==== Playoffs ====
WNBA playoff statistics
Year	Team	GP	GS	MPG	FG%	3P%	FT%	RPG	APG	SPG	BPG	TO	PPG
2025	Phoenix	2	0	4.5	.333	.333	.000	1.0	0.0	0.0	0.0	0.5	1.5
**Career**	1 year, 1 team	2	0	4.5	.333	.333	.000	1.0	0.0	0.0	0.0	0.5	1.5

=== College ===
Ratios
Year	Team	GP	FG%	3P%	FT%	RBG	APG	BPG	SPG	PPG
2015-16	South Florida	29	39.7%	**42.0%**	86.5%	2.35	0.69	**0.48**	0.35	12.55
2016-17	South Florida	33	**40.3%**	38.8%	84.5%	3.52	0.82	0.18	0.64	19.21
2017-18	South Florida	**34**	39.9%	38.2%	**96.5%**	3.38	1.29	0.41	**0.65**	**21.09**
2018-19	South Florida	3	34.0%	33.3%	71.4%	**4.33**	**2.00**	-	0.33	16.33
Career		99	39.8%	39.1%	89.6%	3.15	0.98	0.34	0.55	17.82

Totals
Year	Team	GP	FG	FGA	3P	3PA	FT	FTA	REB	A	BK	ST	PTS
2015-16	South Florida	29	129	325	74	176	32	37	68	20	**14**	10	364
2016-17	South Florida	33	231	573	101	260	71	84	**116**	27	6	21	634
2017-18	South Florida	**34**	**240**	**602**	**126**	**330**	**111**	**115**	115	**44**	**14**	**22**	**717**
2018-19	South Florida	3	16	47	7	21	10	14	13	6	0	1	49
Career		99	616	1547	308	787	224	250	312	97	34	54	1764

Sporting positions
Preceded by (Canada) Kia Nurse (Connecticut)	AAC Freshman of the year 2016	Succeeded by (United States) Tamara Henshaw (South Florida)
