= Lexi Held =

American basketball player (born 1999)

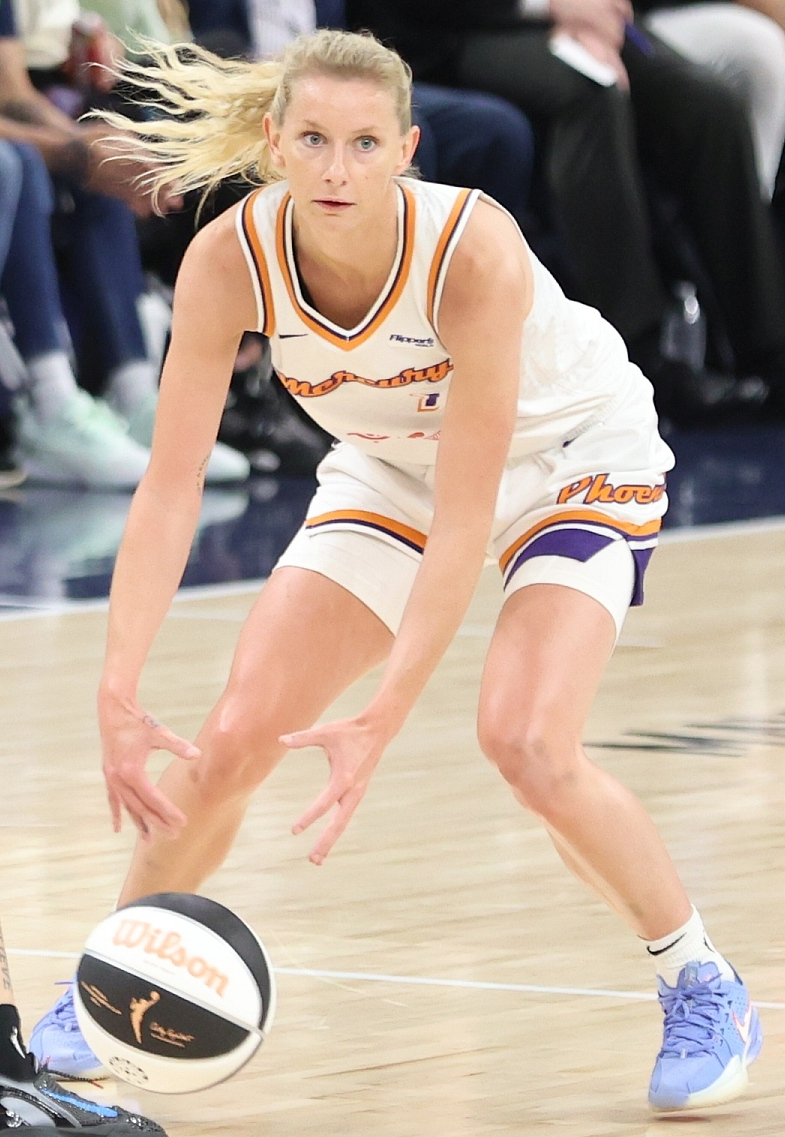
- Held with the Phoenix Mercury in 2025

No. 12 – Phoenix Mercury
- Position: Guard
- League: WNBA

Personal information
- Born: December 28, 1999 (age 26) Burlington, Kentucky, U.S.
- Listed height: 5 ft 9 in (1.75 m)
- Listed weight: 138 lb (63 kg)

Career information
- High school: Cooper (Union, Kentucky)
- College: DePaul (2018–2022)
- WNBA draft: 2022: undrafted
- Playing career: 2024–present

Career history
- 2024–present: PEAC-Pécs
- 2025: Phoenix Mercury
- 2026: Toronto Tempo
- 2026–present: Phoenix Mercury

Career highlights
- First-team All-Big East (2021); Big East All-Freshman Team (2019)
- Stats at Basketball Reference

Alexa Held (born December 28, 1999) is an American professional basketball player for the Phoenix Mercury of the Women's National Basketball Association (WNBA). She previously played for the PEAC-Pécs of the Nemzeti Bajnokság I/A. She played college basketball at DePaul.

== High school career ==
Held attended Cooper High School in Union, Kentucky. She finished her high school career with 2,430 points, 604 rebounds, 341 steals, 315 assists and 97 blocks.

== College career ==
During the 2018–19 season, in her freshman year, she appeared in 32 games, and averaged 15.3 minutes per game. During the 2019–20 season, in her sophomore year, she started 32 games, and averaged 27.3 minutes per game. She scored in double figures 25 times with 20 or more points nine times. She ranked second in the Big East in three-pointers. During the championship game of the 2020 Big East tournament against Marquette, she scored a career-high 31 points, to help DePaul win the tournament, and was subsequently named tournament MVP.

During the 2020–21 season, in her junior year, she led the Big East in steals, steals per game and three-point attempts and was second in three-pointers per game. During the 2021–22 season, in her senior year, she averaged 12.7 points, 5.2 assists and 2.1 steals per game. She ranked second in the Big East in steals, third in assists, assists per game and three-point percentage.

== Professional career ==
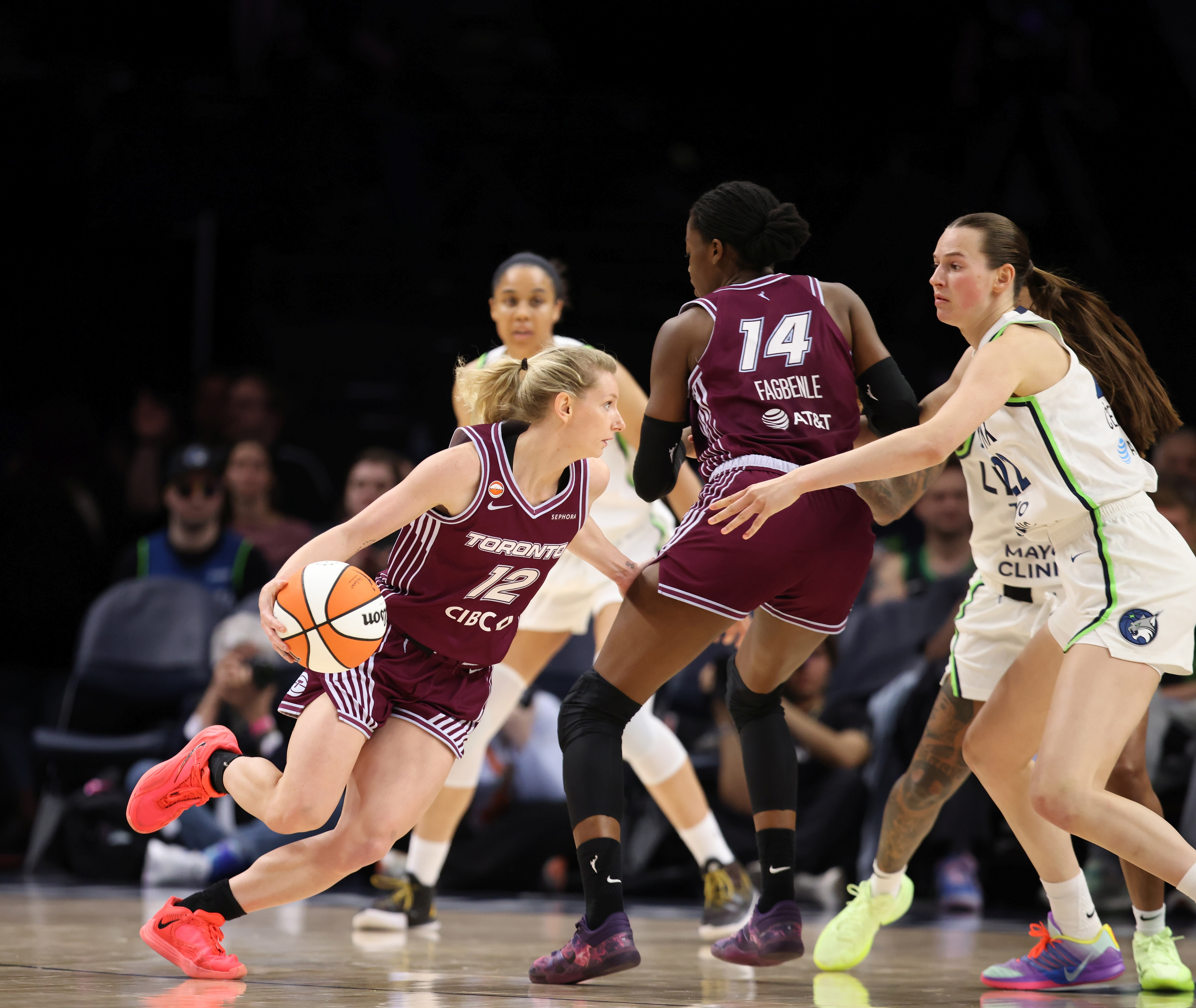
Held during a pre-season game against the Minnesota Lynx while playing for the Toronto Tempo, May 2026

On April 13, 2022, Held signed a training camp contract with the Chicago Sky. She then played overseas in Australia, Hungary, Italy, Poland, and Sweden. On March 5, 2025, she signed a training camp contract with the Phoenix Mercury. On May 15, 2025, she was named to the Mercury's final roster for the 2025 WNBA season. During her rookie season she averaged 5.3 points, 1.1 rebounds, 1.1 assists and 0.7 steals in 14.7 minutes per game. She also posted a six-game stretch of 82 combined points, making her the first Mercury rookie to score at least 80 points in six games since Brittney Griner in 2013.

On April 3, 2026, Held was drafted tenth overall by the Toronto Tempo in the 2026 WNBA expansion draft. On May 28, 2026, she was waived by the Tempo. Prior to being waived she appeared in eight games, and scored nine points while averaging 7.5 minutes per game. On June 1, 2026, she signed with the Phoenix Mercury.

== Personal life ==
Held was born to German American parents Jerome and Monica Held, and has one sister, Hannah Henderson.

== Career statistics ==
Legend
GP	Games played	GS	Games started	MPG	Minutes per game	FG%	Field goal percentage
3P%	3-point field goal percentage	FT%	Free throw percentage	RPG	Rebounds per game	APG	Assists per game
SPG	Steals per game	BPG	Blocks per game	TO	Turnovers per game	PPG	Points per game
**Bold**	Career high	*	Led Division I	°	Led the league	‡	WNBA record

=== WNBA ===
==== Regular season ====
Stats current through the 2025 season

WNBA regular season statistics
Year	Team	GP	GS	MPG	FG%	3P%	FT%	RPG	APG	SPG	BPG	TO	PPG
2025	Phoenix	32	0	14.7	.378	.308	.818	1.1	1.1	0.7	0.2	0.9	5.3
**Career**	1 year, 1 team	32	0	14.7	.378	.308	.818	1.1	1.1	0.7	0.2	0.9	5.3

==== Playoffs ====
WNBA playoff statistics
Year	Team	GP	GS	MPG	FG%	3P%	FT%	RPG	APG	SPG	BPG	TO	PPG
2025	Phoenix	2	0	6.0	.500	.500	.000	1.0	0.0	0.0	0.0	1.0	1.5
**Career**	1 year, 1 team	2	0	6.0	.500	.500	.000	1.0	0.0	0.0	0.0	1.0	1.5
