= Kiana Williams =

American basketball player (born 1999)

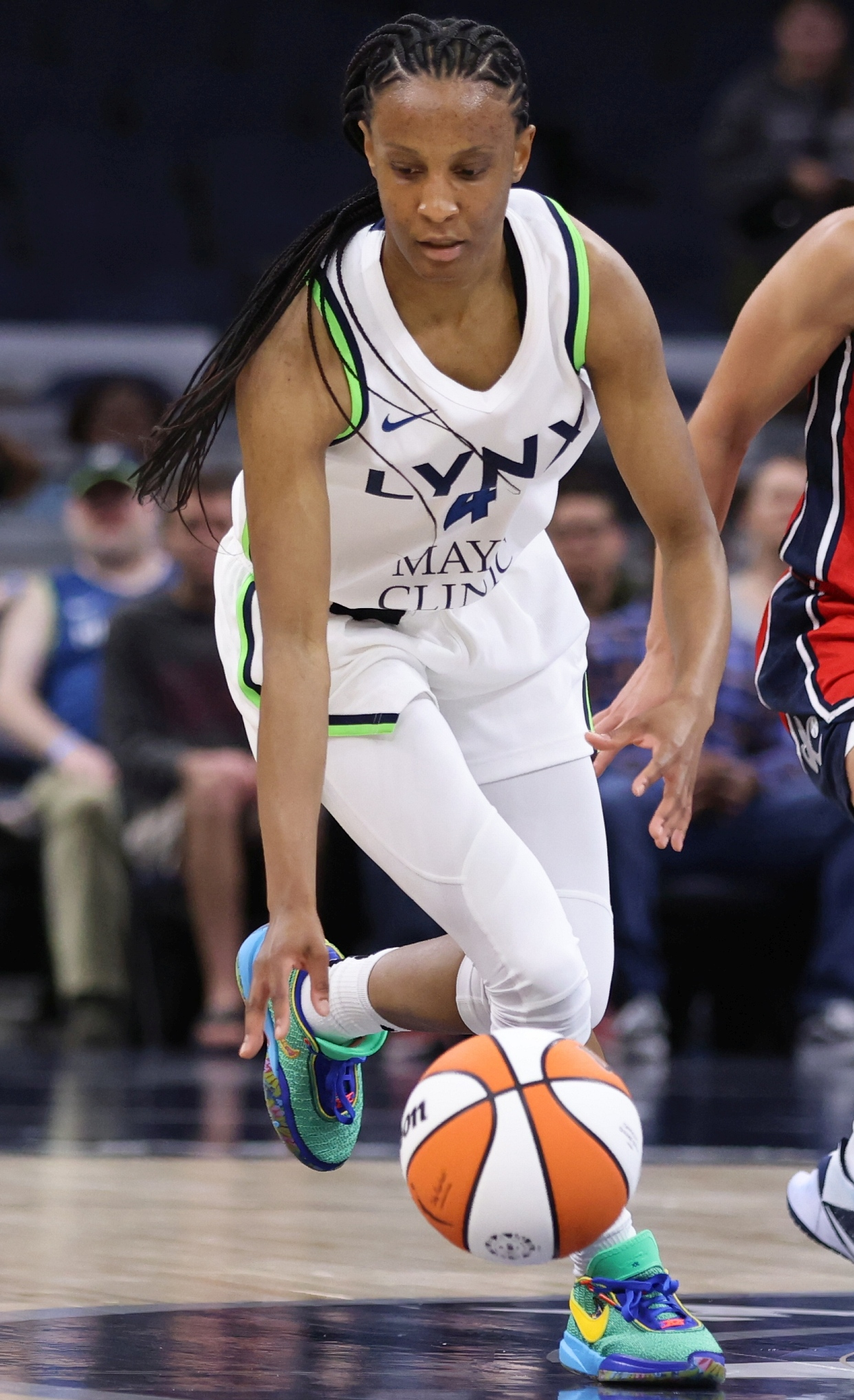
- Williams with the Minnesota Lynx in 2023

No. 23 – Los Angeles Sparks
- Position: Point guard / shooting guard
- League: WNBA

Personal information
- Born: April 9, 1999 (age 27) San Antonio, Texas, U.S.
- Listed height: 5 ft 8 in (1.73 m)
- Listed weight: 140 lb (64 kg)

Career information
- High school: Karen Wagner (San Antonio, Texas)
- College: Stanford (2017–2021)
- WNBA draft: 2021: 2nd round, 18th overall pick
- Drafted by: Seattle Storm
- Playing career: 2021–present

Career history
- 2021–2022: Seattle Storm
- 2021–2022: Adelaide Lightning
- 2022: Connecticut Sun
- 2022–2023: Ceglédi EKK
- 2023–2024: Bursa Büyükşehir Belediyespor
- 2024: Seattle Storm
- 2024–2025: Hefei
- 2025–2026: Phoenix Mercury
- 2025–present: Botaş SK
- 2026–present: Los Angeles Sparks

Career highlights
- Commissioner’s Cup champion (2021); NCAA champion (2021); Second-team All-American – USBWA (2021); Third-team All-American – AP (2021); WBCA All-American (2021); Pac-12 Tournament MOP (2021); 3× All-Pac-12 (2019–2021); Pac-12 All-Freshman team (2018); McDonald's All-American (2017)
- Stats at WNBA.com
- Stats at Basketball Reference
Medals
Women's basketball
Representing United States
Pan American Games
Silver medal – second place	2019 Lima	Team

Kiana Williams (born April 9, 1999) is an American professional basketball player for the Los Angeles Sparks of the Women's National Basketball Association (WNBA) and for Botaş SK of the Turkish Super League. She was drafted 18th overall by the Seattle Storm in the 2021 WNBA draft after playing college basketball at Stanford.

== College career ==
=== Senior season ===
In her senior season, Williams was named an All-American by the United States Basketball Writers Association, Associated Press, and Women's Basketball Coaches Association. In the 2021 Pac-12 Conference women's basketball tournament, she put up 26 points in the championship match and was named the tournament's Most Outstanding Player.

With the 2021 NCAA Division I women's basketball tournament being held in her hometown San Antonio, Williams helped lead the Cardinal to their first national championship since 1992 and was named the tournament's Most Outstanding Player in the Alamo Region. After winning the national championship, Williams and her Stanford teammates donated the ping-pong table the university bought for them in the tournament bubble to the Eastside Boys and Girls Club, where the San Antonio native Williams had spent time growing up.

Williams declared for the WNBA draft at the end of the season, finishing her collegiate career at the program's career 3-point leader and did not miss a game, starting 128 consecutive games over her career.

== Professional career ==
=== WNBA ===
==== First and second stints with the Seattle Storm (2021–2022) ====
Williams was drafted by the Seattle Storm in the second round of the 2021 WNBA draft with the 18th overall pick. Considered a longshot to make the Storm roster with one of the deepest backcourts in the WNBA, Williams made the final roster for the opening game of the 2021 season. She was released from the Seattle Storm roster on June 28, 2021.

On March 1, 2022, Williams signed a training camp contract with the Phoenix Mercury prior to the 2022 WNBA season. She was ultimately released at the end of training camp and did not make the roster.

Williams signed a hardship contract with the Storm on May 27, 2022, and played 3 games with the Storm before being released from her hardship.

==== Connecticut Sun (2022) ====
On July 27, 2022, Williams signed a 7-Day Contract with the Connecticut Sun. She played in one game before being released.

On February 4, 2023, Williams signed a training camp contract with the Minnesota Lynx. On May 8, she was waived by the Lynx and did not make the roster.

==== Third stint with the Seattle Storm (2024) ====
On February 23, 2024, Williams signed a training camp contract with the Storm and made the final roster. On July 2, 2024, she was waived by the Storm. On July 5, 2024, she was re-signed by the team to a seven-day contract and then to a second one on July 14. Upon its expiration on August 18, Williams was released by the Storm.

==== Phoenix Mercury (2025–2026) ====
Williams signed with the Phoenix Mercury on a rest-of-season contract on June 26, 2025. On July 10, she was waived by the Mercury, but she was re-signed by the team to a seven-day contract on July 15 and the signed a second seven-day contract on July 22. She signed her third seven-day contract with the Mercury only on August 13 and upon its expiration on August 20 she signed a rest-of-season contract with the team.

On June 1, 2026, Williams was waived by the Mercury

On June 4, 2026 Williams signed a Player Development Contract with the Mercury.

==== Los Angeles Sparks (2026-present) ====
On June 18, 2026, it was announced that the Los Angeles Sparks had tended an offer sheet to Williams. The next day, Williams signed a contract with the Sparks.

=== Overseas ===
On October 25, 2021 she signed with the Adelaide Lightning of the Women's National Basketball League.

Williams played for Hefei of the Women's Chinese Basketball Association during the 2024–25 season.

Williams signed with Botaş SK of the Turkish Super League for the 2025–26 season.

== National team career ==
Williams played for the United States women's national basketball team at the 2019 Pan American Games, where they earned a silver medal after placing second.

== Career statistics ==
Legend
GP	Games played	GS	Games started	MPG	Minutes per game	RPG	Rebounds per game
APG	Assists per game	SPG	Steals per game	BPG	Blocks per game	PPG	Points per game
TO	Turnovers per game	FG%	Field-goal percentage	3P%	3-point field-goal percentage	FT%	Free-throw percentage
**Bold**	Career best	°	League leader

=== WNBA ===
==== Regular season ====
Stats current through end of 2025 season

WNBA regular season statistics
Year	Team	GP	GS	MPG	FG%	3P%	FT%	RPG	APG	SPG	BPG	TO	PPG
2021	Seattle	10	0	3.5	.143	.167	**1.000**	0.4	0.2	**0.1**	0.0	0.2	0.4
2022	Seattle	3	0	**9.0**	**.250**	.250	.000	**0.7**	**1.7**	0.0	0.0	0.7	**1.7**
2022	Connecticut	1	0	3.0	.000	.000	.000	0.0	0.0	0.0	0.0	**0.0**	0.0
2023	Did not play (waived)												
2024	Seattle	**13**	0	3.5	**.250**	**.333**	.000	0.2	0.4	0.0	0.0	0.2	0.8
2025	Phoenix	11	0	9.7	.425	.346	.500	1.0	0.9	0.3	0.0	0.5	4.1
**Career**	4 years, 3 teams	31	0	4.9	.348	.308	1.000	0.4	0.5	0.1	0.0	0.2	1.3

==== Playoffs ====
WNBA playoff statistics
Year	Team	GP	GS	MPG	FG%	3P%	FT%	RPG	APG	SPG	BPG	TO	PPG
2025	Phoenix	2	0	3.5	1.000	.000	.000	0.5	0.0	0.0	0.0	0.0	1.0
**Career**	1 year, 1 team	2	0	3.5	1.000	.000	.000	0.5	0.0	0.0	0.0	0.0	1.0

=== College ===
Year	Team	GP	GS	MPG	FG%	3P%	FT%	RPG	APG	SPG	BPG	TO	PPG
2017–18	Stanford	35	26	25.7	.414	**.384**	.818	1.7	1.9	0.9	**0.1**	**1.1**	10.4
2018–19	Stanford	**36**	**36**	**34.5**	**.422**	.367	.793	2.8	**4.7**	1.2	**0.1**	2.4	14.3
2019–20	Stanford	33	33	34.2	.416	.347	.840	**3.2**	3.8	1.1	0.0	2.1	**15.0**
2020–21	Stanford	33	33	32.3	.410	.383	**.895**	2.0	3.1	**1.3**	0.0	1.5	14.0
**Career**		137	128	31.6	.416	.370	.833	2.4	3.4	1.1	0.1	1.8	13.4

== Personal life ==
Williams is the daughter of LaChelle and Michael Williams and has three older brothers. During Stanford's tournament run in 2021, Williams' father, a former barbecue joint owner, delivered homemade meals to the team's hotel.
