= Monique Akoa Makani =

Cameroonian basketball player (born 2001)

- Akoa Makani with the Los Angeles Sparks in 2026

No. 1 – Los Angeles Sparks
- Position: Point guard
- League: WNBA

Personal information
- Born: 4 February 2001 (age 25) Edéa, Cameroon
- Listed height: 5 ft 10 in (1.78 m)

Career history
- 2018–2021: ASVEL Féminin
- 2021–2022: CSP Nantes-Rezé
- 2022–2025: Charnay Basket Bourgogne Sud
- 2025–2026: Phoenix Mercury
- 2025–2026: Tango Bourges Basket
- 2026–present: Los Angeles Sparks
- Stats at Basketball Reference

Monique Akoa Makani (born 4 February 2001) is a Cameroonian professional basketball player for the Los Angeles Sparks of the Women's National Basketball Association (WNBA). She previously played for the Phoenix Mercury of the WNBA.

== Early life ==
Akoa Makani was born on 4 February 2001, in Edéa, Cameroon. She grew up there before moving with her family to France at age nine. She grew up playing soccer before trying out basketball in school, afterwards joining the local club Basket Charpennes Croix-Luizet. She played there for a year before joining the club ASVEL Féminin. She was a member of the ASVEL training centre for nine years.

== Professional career ==
=== France ===
Akoa Makani was promoted to ASVEL's first-team towards the end of the 2018–19 season, appearing in four games while averaging 2.8 points and helping them win the Ligue Féminine de Basketball (LFB) title. She saw limited playing time for the club across the 2019–20 and 2020–21 seasons. For the 2021–22 season, she played with CSP Nantes-Rezé in Ligue 2, averaging 12.8 points per game.

Akoa Makani moved to Charnay Basket Bourgogne Sud in 2022–23 and averaged 6.8 points while helping the club win the league title and a promotion to the LFB. In the LFB, she averaged 12.5 points for Charnay in 2023–24 and 14.7 points in 2024–25.

Akoa Makani signed with Tango Bourges Basket for the 2025–26 season.

=== WNBA ===
==== Phoenix Mercury (2025–2026) ====
On 25 March 2025, Akoa Makani signed a training camp contract with the Phoenix Mercury of the Women's National Basketball Association (WNBA). She made the team's final roster.

==== Los Angeles Sparks (2026–present) ====
On 1 August 2026, the Mercury traded Akoa Makani, along with a 2027 first-round pick and a 2028 second-round pick, to the Los Angeles Sparks in exchange for Kelsey Plum.

== International career ==
Akoa Makani has competed for the Cameroon women's national basketball team, participating at the 2023 Women's Afrobasket and in qualifiers for the 2024 Afrobasket.

== Career statistics ==
=== WNBA ===
==== Regular season ====
WNBA regular season statistics
Year	Team	GP	GS	MPG	FG%	3P%	FT%	RPG	APG	SPG	BPG	TO	PPG
2025	Phoenix	41	40	21.5	.430	.398	.927	2.2	2.7	.8	.1	1.3	7.7
2026	Phoenix	19	16	23.4	.439	.436	.864	2.1	2.5	1.2	.2	2.0	9.4
2026	Los Angeles	11	1	19.0	.347	.261	.786	1.5	1.7	.6	.4	2.2	4.6
Career	2 years, 2 teams	71	57	21.6	.424	.393	.879	2.1	2.5	.9	.2	1.6	7.7

==== Playoffs ====
WNBA playoff statistics
Year	Team	GP	GS	MPG	FG%	3P%	FT%	RPG	APG	SPG	BPG	TO	PPG
2025	Phoenix	11	11	24.4	.356	.333	.933	2.5	3.0	.5	.0	1.5	6.9
Career	1 year, 1 team	11	11	24.4	.356	.333	.933	2.5	3.0	.5	.0	1.5	6.9
