= Kalani Brown =

American basketball player (born 1997)

- Brown in 2025

No. 20 – Las Vegas Aces
- Position: Center
- League: WNBA

Personal information
- Born: March 21, 1997 (age 29) Slidell, Louisiana, U.S.
- Listed height: 6 ft 7 in (2.01 m)
- Listed weight: 245 lb (111 kg)

Career information
- High school: Salmen (Slidell, Louisiana)
- College: Baylor (2015–2019)
- WNBA draft: 2019: 1st round, 7th overall pick
- Drafted by: Los Angeles Sparks
- Playing career: 2019–present

Career history
- 2019: Los Angeles Sparks
- 2019–2020: Xinjiang Magic Deer
- 2020–2021: Atlanta Dream
- 2020–2021: Kayseri Basketbol
- 2021–2022: Hatayspor
- 2022–2023: Maccabi Bnot Ashdod
- 2023: Xinjiang Magic Deer
- 2023–2024: Dallas Wings
- 2024–2025: Inner Mongolia
- 2025: Phoenix Mercury
- 2026-present: Las Vegas Aces

Career highlights
- NCAA champion (2019); 3× WBCA Coaches' All-American (2017–2019); Second-team All-American – USBWA (2019); All-American – USBWA (2018); Big 12 Player of the Year (2018); 2× Second-team All-American – AP (2018, 2019); 2× Big 12 Tournament Most Outstanding Player (2018, 2019); 2× Big 12 All-Defensive Team (2017, 2019); 3× First-team All-Big 12 (2017–2019); Big 12 All-Freshman Team (2016); McDonald's All-American (2015)
- Stats at Basketball Reference
Medals
Women's basketball
Representing the United States
FIBA Americas Under-16 Championship
Gold medal – first place	2013 Mexico	Team

Kalani Brown (born March 21, 1997) is an American professional basketball player for the Las Vegas Aces of the Women's National Basketball Association (WNBA). She has received multiple honors during her playing career, and was named an All-American by the Women's Basketball Coaches Association (WBCA) following the 2017 and 2018 seasons.

== WNBA career ==
=== Dallas Wings (2023–2024) ===
On February 2, 2023, Brown signed a training camp contract with the Dallas Wings. Brown went through training camp with the Wings, but was one of the last cuts they made and she did not make the 2023 Opening Night roster. She returned a few weeks later to the Wings, as she signed a hardship contract due to the Wings having injuries on the team. On June 23, 2023, Brown was released from her Hardship Contract with the Wings. She returned a day later on another hardship contract with the Wings.

=== Phoenix Mercury (2025) ===
On February 2, 2025, Brown was traded to the Phoenix Mercury in a four-team trade.

=== Las Vegas Aces (2026–present) ===
On August 29, 2026, Brown signed with the Las Vegas Aces following NaLyssa Smith's season ending injury.

== Personal ==
Brown is the daughter of DeJuna (Dee) and former NBA veteran and champion with the Boston Celtics, P. J. Brown. She has two sisters, Briana and Whitney, and a brother, Javani. Both of her parents played for Louisiana Tech University, and her mother was an assistant coach at Salmen High School. In December 2018, Salmen retired Kalani Brown's number. In 2015, she was named a McDonald's All-American during her senior year at the school. At Baylor, she majored in communications studies.

== Career statistics ==
Legend
GP	Games played	GS	Games started	MPG	Minutes per game	RPG	Rebounds per game
APG	Assists per game	SPG	Steals per game	BPG	Blocks per game	PPG	Points per game
TO	Turnovers per game	FG%	Field-goal percentage	3P%	3-point field-goal percentage	FT%	Free-throw percentage
**Bold**	Career best	°	League leader

*	Denotes season(s) in which Brown won an NCAA Championship

=== WNBA ===
==== Regular season ====
WNBA regular season statistics
Year	Team	GP	GS	MPG	FG%	3P%	FT%	RPG	APG	SPG	BPG	TO	PPG
2019	Los Angeles	28	0	13.5	.478	.000	.783	3.5	.6	**.3**	**.8**	1.0	5.1
2020	Atlanta	10	0	6.1	.522	—	.600	1.2	.0	.1	.1	.5	3.0
2021	Atlanta	1	0	5.0	.333	—	.000	1.0	.0	.0	.0	**.0**	2.0
2022	Did not play (waived)												
2023	Dallas	32	**5**	**16.4**	.629	.000	**.802**	**4.5**	1.0	.2	.7	1.3	**7.8**
2024	Dallas	**38**	2	13.5	.582	.000	.661	3.1	**1.1**	.2	.6	1.2	5.9
2025	Phoenix	29	1	12.8	.615	**.375**	.771	4.0	.6	.2	.6	.8	5.1
2026	Las Vegas	3	0	6.0	**.778**	—	.800	1.7	.3	**.3**	.7	.7	6.0
**Career**	7 years, 5 teams	142	8	13.2	.578	.231	.751	3.5	.8	.2	.6	1.0	5.7

==== Playoffs ====
WNBA playoff statistics
Year	Team	GP	GS	MPG	FG%	3P%	FT%	RPG	APG	SPG	BPG	TO	PPG
2019	Los Angeles	3	0	5.7	**1.000**	—	.500	2.0	.3	.0	.3	.7	4.3
2023	Dallas	**5**	0	8.6	.583	—	.400	2.2	**.4**	.6	.2	.8	**6.0**
2025	Phoenix	3	0	8.3	.375	—	**.857**	1.7	.0	**.7**	**.7**	1.0	4.0
2026	Las Vegas	**5**	**1**	**9.0**	.444	—	.600	**3.4**	.0	.0	.4	**.2**	3.8
**Career**	4 years, 4 teams	16	1	8.1	.554	—	.632	2.4	.2	.3	.4	.6	4.6

=== College ===
NCAA statistics
Year	Team	GP	GS	MPG	FG%	3P%	FT%	RPG	APG	SPG	BPG	TO	PPG
2015–16	Baylor	**38**	1	14.4	.603	—	.626	4.3	.6	**.5**	1.3	**1.3**	9.3
2016–17	Baylor	37	26	21.4	**.679**	—	.760	8.2	1.3	.4	**2.0**	1.8	15.4
2017–18	Baylor	35	35	**29.6**	.650	—	**.760**	**10.2**	**1.7**	.4	1.4	2.2	**20.1**
2018–19*	Baylor	**37**	**37**	26.8	.614	.000	.752	8.2	1.6	.3	1.7	1.8	15.8
**Career**		147	99	22.9	.639	.000	.733	7.7	1.3	.4	1.6	1.8	15.0
