= 2025 Phoenix Mercury season =

- Head coach: Nate Tibbetts
- Arena: Mortgage Matchup Center (Note: Previously known and operated as the PHX Arena until October 2, 2025.)

Results
- Record: 27–17 (.614)
- Place: 2nd (Western)
- Playoff finish: 4th seed – Lost in WNBA Finals 0–4 to Las Vegas Aces

The 2025 Phoenix Mercury season was the 28th season for the Phoenix Mercury of the Women's National Basketball Association, and the second season under general manager, Nick U'Ren, and head coach, Nate Tibbetts. It was the first season since 2012 without 11-year veteran and 2014 WNBA champion Brittney Griner under contract, who signed with the Atlanta Dream in free agency. It was also the first season following the retirement of 3-time WNBA champion and WNBA all-time leading scorer Diana Taurasi who spent all 20 of her WNBA seasons (2004–2014, 2016–2024) with the franchise. This was Phoenix's first winning season since 2021. They went on to reach the 2025 WNBA Finals, losing to the Las Vegas Aces in 4 games, in the first best-of-seven championship series in WNBA history.

== Draft ==
Round	Pick	Player	Position	Nationality	College/Club	Outcome
None

== Transactions ==
=== Front office and coaching ===
Date	Details	Ref.

=== Trades ===
February
February 2 (Four-team trade)	To Phoenix Mercury Alyssa Thomas (from Connecticut Sun); Satou Sabally, Kalani Brown, and Sevgi Uzun (from Dallas Wings)	To Connecticut Sun Rebecca Allen and Natasha Cloud (from Phoenix Mercury); Jacy Sheldon (from Dallas Wings); 2025 No. 8 draft pick (from Indiana Fever)
February 2 (Four-team trade)	To Dallas Wings DiJonai Carrington and Tyasha Harris (from Connecticut Sun); NaLyssa Smith and right to swap third-round picks in 2027 draft (from Indiana Fever); Rights to Mikiah Herbert Harrigan and the 2025 No. 12 pick (from Phoenix Mercury)	To Indiana Fever Sophie Cunningham and the 2025 No. 19 pick (from Phoenix Mercury); Jaelyn Brown (from Dallas Wings)

=== Free agency ===
==== Re-signed ====
Player	Date	Notes	Ref.
Natasha Mack	January 17	Training camp contract	
Celeste Taylor	January 22	Training camp contract	
Amy Atwell	February 2	Training camp contract	
Murjanatu Musa	May 19	Activated	

==== Additions ====
Player	Date	Notes	Former Team	Ref.
Sami Whitcomb	February 2	Details unannounced	Seattle Storm	
Anna Makurat	February 7	Training camp contract	Geas Basket	
Lexi Held	February 7	Training camp contract	PEAC-Pécs	
Kathryn Westbeld	February 10	Training camp contract	TARR KSC Szekszárd	
Kitija Laksa	February 11	One-year deal	Fenerbahçe S.K.	
Murjanatu Musa	February 17	Training camp contract	Tarbes Gespe Bigorre	
Monique Akoa Makani	March 11	Training camp contract	Charnay Basket Bourgogne Sud	
Shyla Heal	March 13	Training camp contract	Tarsus Belediyesi Mersin	
Alexis Prince	March 20	Training camp contract	Elitzur Ramla	
Helena Pueyo	April 16	Training camp contract	Basket Zaragoza	
Julia Ayrault	April 17	Training camp contract	Michigan State Spartans	
Megan McConnell	April 17	Training camp contract	Duquesne Dukes	
Megan McConnell	June 3	Rest of season contract	Duquesne Dukes	
Temira Poindexter	April 18	Training camp contract	Kansas State Wildcats	
Haley Jones	June 1	Hardship contract	Atlanta Dream	
Kiana Williams	June 26	Rest of season contract	Hefei	
Kiana Williams	July 15	7-day contract	Free agent	
Kiana Williams	July 22	7-day contract	Free agent	
Kiana Williams	August 13	7-day contract	Free agent	
Kiana Williams	August 20	Rest of season contract	Free agent	
DeWanna Bonner	July 8	Rest of season contract	Free agent	

=== Subtractions / unsigned ===
Player	Date	Reason	New Team	Ref.
Charisma Osborne	—	Free agency – unrestricted	—	
Klara Lundquist	February 18, 2022	Suspended – contract expired	—	
Monique Billings	December 6, 2024	Free agency – unrestricted / Expansion draft	Golden State Valkyries	
Brittney Griner	February 1, 2025	Free agency – uncoreable unrestricted	Atlanta Dream	
Amy Atwell	February 13, 2025	Waived	—	
Diana Taurasi	February 25, 2025	Retired	N/A	
Julia Ayrault	April 25, 2025	Suspended – personal decision	N/A – retained rights	
Shyla Heal	May 7, 2025	Waived	—	
Anna Makurat	May 7, 2025	Waived	—	
Helena Pueyo	May 9, 2025	Suspended – personal decision	N/A – retained rights	
Temira Poindexter	May 15, 2025	Waived	–	
Celeste Taylor	May 15, 2025	Waived	—	
Murjanatu Musa	May 15, 2025	Suspended contract – temporary	N/A – retained rights	
Murjanatu Musa	July 8, 2025	Waived	—	
Megan McConnell	May 15, 2025	Waived	—	
Megan McConnell	June 26, 2025	Waived	—	
Alexis Prince	May 19, 2025	Waived	—	
Sevgi Uzun	June 2, 2025	Waived	Chicago Sky	
Haley Jones	June 8, 2025	Waived	Dallas Wings	
Kiana Williams	July 10, 2025	Waived	—	
Kiana Williams	July 22, 2025	Released — end of 7-day contract	—	
Kiana Williams	July 29, 2025	Released — end of 7-day contract	—	
Kiana Williams	August 20, 2025	Released — end of 7-day contract	—	

== Roster ==
2025 Phoenix Mercury roster
Players
Coaches

Pos.	No.	Nat.	Name	Height	Weight	DOB	From	Yrs
G	8	(Cameroon)	Akoa Makani, Monique	5' 11" (1.8m)		2001-02-04	Cameroon	R
G/F	14	(North Macedonia)	Bonner, DeWanna	6' 4" (1.93m)	140 lb (64kg)	1987-08-21	Auburn	15
C	21	(United States)	Brown, Kalani	6' 7" (2.01m)	245 lb (111kg)	1997-03-21	Baylor	5
G/F	2	(United States)	Copper, Kahleah	6' 1" (1.85m)	165 lb (75kg)	1994-08-28	Rutgers	9
G	1	(United States)	Held, Lexi	5' 10" (1.78m)	150 lb (68kg)	1999-12-28	DePaul	R
G	9	(Latvia)	Laksa, Kitija	6' 1" (1.85m)	155 lb (70kg)	1996-05-21	South Florida	R
F	4	(United States)	Mack, Natasha	6' 4" (1.93m)	182 lb (83kg)	1997-11-03	Oklahoma State	2
F	0	(Germany)	Sabally, Satou (injured)	6' 4" (1.93m)	175 lb (79kg)	1998-04-25	Oregon	5
F	25	(United States)	Thomas, Alyssa	6' 2" (1.88m)	203 lb (92kg)	1992-04-12	Maryland	11
F	24	(United States)	Westbeld, Kathryn	6' 3" (1.91m)		1996-01-29	Notre Dame	R
G	33	(Australia)	Whitcomb, Sami	5' 10" (1.78m)	149 lb (68kg)	1988-07-20	Washington	8
G	23	(United States)	Williams, Kiana	5' 7" (1.7m)	140 lb (64kg)	1999-04-09	Stanford	3
G	–	(United States)	Ayrault, Julia (S)	6' 2" (1.88m)			Michigan State	–
G	—	(Sweden)	Lundquist, Klara (S)	5' 8" (1.73m)		1999-08-28	Sweden	–
G	–	(Spain)	Pueyo, Helena (S)	6' 0" (1.83m)		2001-02-13	Arizona	–

Head coach
(United States) Nate Tibbetts (South Dakota)
Assistant coaches
(United States) Michael Joiner (Florida State)
(United States) Kristi Toliver (Maryland)
(United States) Megan Vogel (South Dakota State)
Athletic trainer
(United States) Hannah Wengertsman (Boston University)
Strength and conditioning coach
(United States) Annalise Pickrel (Michigan State)

Legend

- (C) Team captain
- (DP) Unsigned draft pick
- (FA) Free agent
- (S) Suspended
- Injured

=== Depth ===
Pos.	Starter	Bench
PG	Monique Akoa Makani
SG	Kahleah Copper	Lexi Held; Sami Whitcomb
SF	Satou Sabally	Kitija Laksa
PF	Alyssa Thomas	Kathryn Westbeld
C	Natasha Mack	Kalani Brown

== Schedule ==
=== Preseason ===
2025 pre-season game log
Total: 0–2 (Home: 0–1; Road: 0–1)
May: 0–2 (Home: 0–1; Road: 0–1)

Game	Date	Team	Score	High points	High rebounds	High assists	Location Attendance	Record
1	May 6	@ Las Vegas	L 84–85	Sabally, Westbeld (14)	Shyla Heal (7)	Alyssa Thomas (5)	Michelob Ultra Arena; 8,637	0–1
2	May 11	Golden State	L 79–84	Sabally, Thomas (15)	Sami Whitcomb (8)	Alyssa Thomas (6)	PHX Arena; 6,430	0–2

2025 pre-season schedule

=== Regular season ===
2025 game log
Total: 27–17 (Home: 15–7; Road: 12–10)
May: 4–2 (Home: 4–1; Road: 0–1)

Game	Date	Team	Score	High points	High rebounds	High assists	Location Attendance	Record
1	May 17	Seattle	W 81–59	Satou Sabally (27)	Alexis Prince (8)	Alyssa Thomas (6)	PHX Arena; 10,623	1–0
2	May 21	Los Angeles	W 89–86	Satou Sabally (25)	Kathryn Westbeld (6)	Alyssa Thomas (7)	PHX Arena; 8,024	2–0
3	May 23	@ Seattle	L 70–77	Alyssa Thomas (16)	Alyssa Thomas (11)	Alyssa Thomas (7)	Climate Pledge Arena; 9,091	2–1
4	May 25	Washington	W 68–62	Monique Akoa Makani (13)	Sabally, Thomas (8)	Alyssa Thomas (5)	PHX Arena; 10,065	3–1
5	May 27	Chicago	W 94–89	Satou Sabally (20)	Satou Sabally (8)	Alyssa Thomas (15)	PHX Arena; 8,818	4–1
6	May 30	Minnesota	L 71–74	Satou Sabally (26)	Satou Sabally (11)	Sami Whitcomb (6)	PHX Arena; 9,043	4–2

June : 8–3 (Home: 3–2; Road: 5–1)

Game	Date	Team	Score	High points	High rebounds	High assists	Location Attendance	Record
7	June 1	@ Los Angeles	W 85–80	Satou Sabally (24)	Satou Sabally (9)	Monique Akoa Makani (6)	Crypto.com Arena; 11,033	5–2
8	June 3	@ Minnesota	L 65–88	Lexi Held (16)	Satou Sabally (8)	Lexi Held (3)	Target Center; 8,772	5–3
9	June 5	Golden State	W 86–77	Lexi Held (24)	Kalani Brown (8)	Satou Sabally (5)	PHX Arena; 9,943	6–3
10	June 7	Seattle	L 77–89	Satou Sabally (22)	Musa, Sabally, Whitcomb (5)	Satou Sabally (6)	PHX Arena; 9,876	6–4
11	June 11	Dallas	W 93–80	Satou Sabally (20)	Satou Sabally (8)	Alyssa Thomas (10)	PHX Arena; 13,001	7–4
12	June 15	@ Las Vegas	W 76–70	Satou Sabally (22)	Satou Sabally (9)	Alyssa Thomas (13)	Michelob Ultra Arena; 10,497	8–4
13	June 18	@ Connecticut	W 83–75	Held, Thomas (14)	Satou Sabally (15)	Alyssa Thomas (11)	Mohegan Sun Arena; 7,864	9–4
14	June 19	@ New York	W 89–81	Monique Akoa Makani (21)	Alyssa Thomas (15)	Alyssa Thomas (7)	Barclays Center; 16,383	10–4
15	June 21	@ Chicago	W 104–86	Sami Whitcomb (17)	Mack, Westbeld (5)	Alyssa Thomas (8)	Wintrust Arena; 7,291	11–4
16	June 27	New York	W 106–91	Satou Sabally (25)	Alyssa Thomas (9)	Alyssa Thomas (15)	PHX Arena; 12,009	12–4
17	June 29	Las Vegas	L 81–84	Alyssa Thomas (16)	Satou Sabally (9)	Alyssa Thomas (8)	PHX Arena; 13,247	12–5

July : 4–5 (Home: 2–1; Road: 2–4)

Game	Date	Team	Score	High points	High rebounds	High assists	Location Attendance	Record
18	July 3	@ Dallas	L 89–98	Kahleah Copper (33)	Alyssa Thomas (7)	Alyssa Thomas (10)	College Park Center; 6,162	12–6
19	July 7	Dallas	W 102–72	Sami Whitcomb (36)	Mack, Thomas (10)	Alyssa Thomas (15)	PHX Arena; 11,932	13–6
20	July 9	Minnesota	W 79–71	Alyssa Thomas (29)	Alyssa Thomas (8)	Sami Whitcomb (6)	PHX Arena; 10,083	14–6
21	July 14	@ Golden State	W 78–77	DeWanna Bonner (22)	DeWanna Bonner (11)	Alyssa Thomas (11)	Chase Center; 18,064	15–6
22	July 16	@ Minnesota	L 66–79	Alyssa Thomas (12)	Natasha Mack (13)	Alyssa Thomas (9)	Target Center; 16,421	15–7
All-Star Game
23	July 23	Atlanta	L 79–90	DeWanna Bonner (18)	Alyssa Thomas (11)	Alyssa Thomas (9)	PHX Arena; 11,850	15–8
24	July 25	@ New York	L 76–89	Alyssa Thomas (20)	Alyssa Thomas (13)	Alyssa Thomas (8)	Barclays Center; 17,515	15–9
25	July 27	@ Washington	W 88–72	Alyssa Thomas (27)	Alyssa Thomas (11)	Alyssa Thomas (8)	CareFirst Arena; 4,200	16–9
26	July 30	@ Indiana	L 101–107	Alyssa Thomas (32)	Alyssa Thomas (15)	Alyssa Thomas (7)	Gainbridge Fieldhouse; 17,274	16–10

August : 8–5 (Home: 4–3; Road: 4–2)

Game	Date	Team	Score	High points	High rebounds	High assists	Location Attendance	Record
27	August 1	@ Atlanta	L 72–95	Kahleah Copper (19)	Alyssa Thomas (10)	Monique Akoa Makani (5)	Gateway Center Arena; 3,283	16–11
28	August 3	@ Chicago	W 83–67	Kahleah Copper (25)	Alyssa Thomas (10)	Alyssa Thomas (10)	Wintrust Arena; 7,081	17–11
29	August 5	Connecticut	W 88–62	Satou Sabally (23)	Alyssa Thomas (12)	Alyssa Thomas (12)	PHX Arena; 8,083	18–11
30	August 7	Indiana	W 95–60	DeWanna Bonner (23)	Alyssa Thomas (11)	Alyssa Thomas (10)	PHX Arena; 17,071	19–11
31	August 10	Atlanta	L 66–74	Alyssa Thomas (21)	Alyssa Thomas (8)	Alyssa Thomas (5)	PHX Arena; 13,953	19–12
32	August 15	Las Vegas	L 83–86	Satou Sabally (26)	Mack, Thomas (6)	Alyssa Thomas (9)	PHX Arena; 10,850	19–13
33	August 17	@ Seattle	W 85–82	Alyssa Thomas (19)	Sabally, Thomas (10)	Alyssa Thomas (11)	Climate Pledge Arena; 14,169	20–13
34	August 19	@ Golden State	W 98–91	Kahleah Copper (25)	Alyssa Thomas (9)	Alyssa Thomas (8)	Chase Center; 18,064	21–13
35	August 21	@ Las Vegas	L 61–83	Alyssa Thomas (17)	Alyssa Thomas (11)	Alyssa Thomas (6)	Michelob Ultra Arena; 10,460	21–14
36	August 22	Golden State	W 81–72	Monique Akoa Makani (18)	Alyssa Thomas (12)	Alyssa Thomas (16)	PHX Arena; 10,280	22–14
37	August 26	@ Los Angeles	W 92–84	Satou Sabally (19)	Alyssa Thomas (16)	Alyssa Thomas (15)	Crypto.com Arena; 10,726	23–14
38	August 28	Chicago	W 83–79	Kahleah Copper (28)	Natasha Mack (12)	Alyssa Thomas (6)	PHX Arena; 10,445	24–14
39	August 30	New York	W 80–63	Kahleah Copper (22)	Natasha Mack (10)	Alyssa Thomas (9)	PHX Arena; 13,252	25–14

September : 2–3 (Home: 1–1; Road: 1–2)

Game	Date	Team	Score	High points	High rebounds	High assists	Location Attendance	Record
40	September 2	Indiana	W 85–79	Alyssa Thomas (23)	Natasha Mack (10)	Alyssa Thomas (9)	PHX Arena; 13,132	26–14
41	September 4	@ Washington	W 75–69	Kahleah Copper (18)	Alyssa Thomas (11)	Alyssa Thomas (9)	CareFirst Arena; 4,200	27–14
42	September 6	@ Connecticut	L 84–87	Kahleah Copper (18)	Natasha Mack (9)	Alyssa Thomas (10)	Mohegan Sun Arena; 8,910	27–15
43	September 9	Los Angeles	L 83–88	Satou Sabally (24)	Alyssa Thomas (11)	Alyssa Thomas (10)	PHX Arena; 13,151	27–16
44	September 11	@ Dallas	L 76–97	Satou Sabally (14)	Brown, Akoa Makani, Sabally (5)	Sabally, Thomas (5)	College Park Center; 6,251	27–17

2025 season schedule

Notes:

- Games highlighted in ██ represent Commissioner's Cup games.

=== Playoffs ===
2025 playoff game log
First round vs. New York Liberty

Game	Date	Team	Score	High points	High rebounds	High assists	Location Attendance	Series
1	September 14	New York	L 69–76 (OT)	Kahleah Copper (15)	Alyssa Thomas (9)	Alyssa Thomas (8)	PHX Arena; 10,095	0–1
2	September 17	@ New York	W 86–60	Sabally, Thomas (15)	DeWanna Bonner (8)	Alyssa Thomas (7)	Barclays Center; 17,017	1–1
3	September 19	New York	W 79–73	Satou Sabally (23)	Satou Sabally (12)	Alyssa Thomas (11)	PHX Arena; 13,104	2–1

Semifinals vs Minnesota Lynx

Game	Date	Team	Score	High points	High rebounds	High assists	Location Attendance	Series
1	September 21	@ Minnesota	L 69–82	Kahleah Copper (22)	DeWanna Bonner (9)	Alyssa Thomas (7)	Target Center; 10,121	0–1
2	September 23	@ Minnesota	W 89–83 (OT)	Satou Sabally (24)	Satou Sabally (9)	Alyssa Thomas (13)	Target Center; 10,824	1–1
3	September 26	Minnesota	W 84–76	Satou Sabally (23)	Alyssa Thomas (9)	Alyssa Thomas (8)	PHX Arena; 15,941	2–1
4	September 28	Minnesota	W 86–81	Alyssa Thomas (23)	Alyssa Thomas (8)	Alyssa Thomas (10)	PHX Arena; 16,919	3–1

Finals vs Las Vegas Aces

Game	Date	Team	Score	High points	High rebounds	High assists	Location Attendance	Series
1	October 3	@ Las Vegas	L 86–89	Kahleah Copper (21)	Alyssa Thomas (10)	Alyssa Thomas (9)	Michelob Ultra Arena; 10,266	0–1
2	October 5	@ Las Vegas	L 78–91	Kahleah Copper (23)	Natasha Mack (10)	Monique Akoa Makani (7)	Michelob Ultra Arena; 10,404	0–2
3	October 8	Las Vegas	L 88–90	DeWanna Bonner (25)	Alyssa Thomas (12)	Alyssa Thomas (9)	Mortgage Matchup Center; 17,071	0–3
4	October 10	Las Vegas	L 86–97	Kahleah Copper (30)	Alyssa Thomas (12)	Alyssa Thomas (10)	Mortgage Matchup Center; 17,071	0–4

2025 playoff schedule

== Standings ==
#	Team	W	L	PCT	GB	Conf.	Home	Road	Cup
1	yx – Minnesota Lynx	34	10	.773	–	20–4	20–2	14–8	5–1
2	x – Las Vegas Aces	30	14	.682	4	16–8	17–5	13–9	2–4
3	x – Atlanta Dream	30	14	.682	4	15–6	16–6	14–8	3–2
4	x – Phoenix Mercury	27	17	.614	7	13–11	15–7	12–10	4–2
5	x – New York Liberty	27	17	.614	7	15–5	17–5	10–12	4–1
6	cx – Indiana Fever	24	20	.545	10	13–8	13–9	11–11	4–1
7	x – Seattle Storm	23	21	.523	11	12–12	10–12	13–9	4–2
8	x – Golden State Valkyries	23	21	.523	11	9–15	14–8	9–13	3–3
9	e – Los Angeles Sparks	21	23	.477	13	10–14	9–13	12–10	2–4
10	e – Washington Mystics	16	28	.364	18	8–12	10–12	6–16	2–3
11	e – Connecticut Sun	11	33	.250	23	7–14	7–15	4–18	1–4
12	e – Chicago Sky	10	34	.227	24	4–17	6–16	4–18	1–4
13	e – Dallas Wings	10	34	.227	24	4–20	6–16	4–18	1–5

Notes

(#) – League Standing
c – Commissioner's Cup winners
y – Regular Season Champion
x – Clinched playoff berth
e – Eliminated from playoff contention
Source: Overall standings and Commissioner's Cup Standings

== Playoffs ==
First Round: Best-of-3
**1**	**Minnesota Lynx**	**2**
8	Golden State Valkyries	0
4	**Phoenix Mercury**	2
5	New York Liberty	1
2	**Las Vegas Aces**	**2**
7	Seattle Storm	1
3	Atlanta Dream	1
6	**Indiana Fever**	**2**

Semifinals: Best-of-5
1	Minnesota Lynx	1
4	**Phoenix Mercury**	**3**
2	**Las Vegas Aces**	**3**
6	Indiana Fever	2

Finals: Best-of-7
4	Phoenix Mercury	0
2	**Las Vegas Aces**	**4**

- **Bold** – Series winner
- Italic – Team with home-court-advantage

== Statistics ==
Legend
GP	Games played	GS	Games started	MPG	Minutes per game	RPG	Rebounds per game
APG	Assists per game	SPG	Steals per game	BPG	Blocks per game	PPG	Points per game
FG%	Field-goal percentage	3P%	3-point field-goal percentage	FT%	Free-throw percentage	TO	Turnovers per game
PF	Fouls per game		Team leader		League leader

=== Regular season ===
Phoenix Mercury Regular Season Team Statistics
Player	GP	GS	MPG	FG%	3P%	FT%	RPG	APG	SPG	BPG	TO	PPG
Alyssa Thomas	39	39	31.3	53.2%	0.0%	69.2%	8.8	9.2	1.6	0.4	3.5	15.4
Kahleah Copper	28	28	26.9	42.4%	37.7%	85.2%	2.9	1.5	1.1	0.2	2.2	15.6
Satou Sabally	39	39	26.6	40.4%	32.1%	82.7%	5.9	2.5	1.3	0.3	2.0	16.3
DeWanna Bonner	24	1	24.4	42.6%	32.6%	86.6%	4.3	1.0	0.7	0.3	0.8	10.9
Sami Whitcomb	43	20	23.9	38.5%	36.1%	85.2%	2.6	2.5	0.8	0.2	1.6	9.1
Alexis Prince	1	0	22.0	33.3%	0.0%	—	8.0	1.0	—	—	3.0	2.0
Monique Akoa Makani	41	40	21.5	43.0%	39.8%	92.7%	2.2	2.7	0.8	0.1	1.3	7.7
Kitija Laksa	33	5	19.0	36.7%	31.7%	81.3%	1.2	0.6	0.4	0.2	0.6	5.9
Kathryn Westbeld	43	24	18.4	35.8%	32.1%	78.1%	2.5	0.9	0.8	0.6	0.6	5.1
Natasha Mack	34	23	18.3	57.3%	0.0%	47.2%	5.8	0.9	0.9	1.5	0.4	4.7
Lexi Held	32	0	14.7	37.8%	30.8%	81.8%	1.1	1.1	0.7	0.2	0.9	5.3
Sevgi Uzun	7	0	14.6	21.4%	12.5%	66.7%	0.9	2.0	0.6	0.4	1.4	1.6
Megan McConnell	1	0	13.0	25.0%	50.0%	—	1.0	3.0	1.0	—	—	3.0
Kalani Brown	29	1	12.8	61.5%	37.5%	77.1%	4.0	0.6	0.2	0.6	0.8	5.1
Haley Jones	4	0	12.0	33.3%	50.0%	—	2.0	1.0	0.3	0.3	0.5	2.3
Murjanatu Musa	12	0	10.2	45.7%	50.0%	63.6%	2.6	0.6	0.3	0.2	0.6	3.3
Kiana Williams	11	0	9.7	42.5%	34.6%	50.0%	1.0	0.9	0.3	—	0.5	4.1

=== Playoffs ===
Phoenix Mercury Playoff Team Statistics
Player	GP	GS	MPG	FG%	3P%	FT%	RPG	APG	SPG	BPG	TO	PPG
Alyssa Thomas	11	11	36.7	50.0%	0.0%	65.1%	9.0	8.8	1.7	0.4	4.1	16.9
Kahleah Copper	11	11	34.2	46.5%	31.6%	90.9%	3.5	0.8	0.4	0.2	1.7	17.8
Satou Sabally	10	10	32.6	39.9%	33.3%	86.7%	7.0	2.5	1.1	0.2	2.2	19.0
DeWanna Bonner	11	1	26.2	40.0%	29.4%	46.4%	6.8	1.0	1.0	0.6	0.5	9.1
Monique Akoa Makani	11	11	24.4	35.6%	33.3%	93.3%	2.5	3.0	0.5	—	1.5	6.9
Sami Whitcomb	11	0	23.0	28.8%	24.1%	66.7%	1.9	2.5	1.2	0.2	1.1	5.9
Natasha Mack	11	11	14.0	55.6%	0.0%	100.0%	3.9	0.7	0.4	0.7	0.4	2.9
Kathryn Westbeld	11	0	11.6	43.3%	37.5%	—	2.4	0.5	0.7	0.1	0.4	3.2
Kalani Brown	3	0	8.3	37.5%	—	85.7%	1.7	—	0.7	0.7	1.0	4.0
Lexi Held	2	0	6.0	50.0%	50.0%	—	1.0	—	—	—	1.0	1.5
Kitija Laksa	2	0	4.5	33.3%	33.3%	—	1.0	—	—	—	0.5	1.5
Kiana Williams	2	0	3.5	100.0%	—	—	0.5	—	—	—	—	1.0

== Awards and honors ==
Recipient	Award	Date awarded	Ref.
Alyssa Thomas	WNBA All-Star Reserve	July 7	
Alyssa Thomas	Western Conference Player of the Week	July 15	
Alyssa Thomas	Western Conference Player of the Week	September 2	
Alyssa Thomas	AP All-WNBA First Team	September 12	
Alyssa Thomas	WNBA Most Valuable Player Top 5 Finalist	September 19	
Alyssa Thomas	WNBA All-Defensive First Team	October 8	
Alyssa Thomas	All-WNBA First Team	October 10	
Satou Sabally	WNBA All-Star Starter	June 30	
