= 2025 WNBA playoffs =

Professional women's basketball tournament

- Dates: September 14 – October 10, 2025

Final positions
- Champions: Las Vegas Aces
- Runners-up: Phoenix Mercury

Tournament statistics
- Attendance: 297,778
- Scoring leader(s): A'ja Wilson (Las Vegas) (26.8 PPG)

Awards
- MVP: A'ja Wilson (Las Vegas)

The 2025 WNBA playoffs was the postseason tournament of the Women's National Basketball Association's 2025 season. The playoffs began on September 14 and ended on October 10, 2025, with the Las Vegas Aces winning their third championship.

== Overview ==
=== Updates to postseason appearances ===
- The Las Vegas Aces entered the postseason for their seventh consecutive season, the longest active postseason appearance streak in the WNBA.
- The New York Liberty entered the postseason for the fifth consecutive season.
- The Atlanta Dream and Minnesota Lynx entered the post season for the third consecutive season.
- The Indiana Fever, Phoenix Mercury, and Seattle Storm entered the postseason for their second consecutive season.
- The Golden State Valkyries entered the postseason for the first time in franchise history.
- The Connecticut Sun missed the postseason, ending an eight-season postseason appearance streak.
- The Chicago Sky missed the postseason for the second consecutive season.
- The Dallas Wings missed the postseason for the second consecutive season.
- The Washington Mystics missed the postseason for the second consecutive season.
- The Los Angeles Sparks missed the postseason for the fifth consecutive season, the longest active postseason drought in the WNBA.

=== Notable occurrences ===
- The Golden State Valkyries became the first expansion team in WNBA history to make the postseason in their inaugural season.
- This is the first time since 2011 that all playoff teams have a winning record.

== Format ==
The first round of the WNBA playoffs consists of a best-of-three series, with the following matchups: No. 1 vs. No. 8, No. 2 vs. No. 7, No. 3 vs. No. 6, and No. 4 vs. No. 5. The higher seed in the first round had home-court advantage in Games 1 and, if necessary, 3.

In the semifinals of the postseason, a best-of-five series, the higher seed hosted Games 1, 2 and, if necessary, 5. Additionally, the WNBA Finals was a best-of-seven format for the first time in the league's history. Games 1 and 2, as well as Games 5 and 7, if necessary, was hosted by the higher seed.

== Broadcast ==
All games are being aired across the ESPN family of networks, which includes ESPN, ESPN2, ESPNU, and ABC in the US and on TSN, Sportsnet, and NBA TV Canada in Canada.

All games can be watched outside USA & Canada via the WNBA League Pass.

== Playoff qualifying ==
Seed	Team	Record	Clinched	
Seed	Team	Record	Playoff berth	Top record
1	Minnesota Lynx	34–10	August 13	August 30
2	Las Vegas Aces ^{[note 1]}	30–14	August 25	No
3	Atlanta Dream ^{[note 1]}	30–14	August 29	No
4	Phoenix Mercury ^{[note 2]}	27–17	August 29	No
5	New York Liberty ^{[note 2]}	27–17	September 2	No
6	Indiana Fever	24–20	September 7	No
7	Seattle Storm ^{[note 3]}	23–21	September 9	No
8	Golden State Valkyries ^{[note 3]}	23–21	September 4	No

^{[note 1]} The Las Vegas Aces earned the second seed by virtue of the first tiebreaker, head-to-head record between the teams, as the Aces won all three regular season match-ups with the Dream.

^{[note 2]} The Phoenix Mercury earned the fourth seed by virtue of the first tiebreaker, head-to-head record between the teams, as the Mercury won three of the four regular season match-ups with the Liberty.

^{[note 3]} The Seattle Storm and Golden State Valkyries tied their regular season series two games a piece, so a second tiebreaker was required. The second tiebreaker was record against teams with a .500+ winning percentage. The Storm finished 10–13 in this category, while the Valkyries finished 10–18. Therefore, the Storm earned the seventh seed, and the Valkyries were the eighth seed.

== Bracket ==
First Round: Best-of-3
**1**	**Minnesota Lynx**	**2**
8	Golden State Valkyries	0
4	**Phoenix Mercury**	2
5	New York Liberty	1
2	**Las Vegas Aces**	**2**
7	Seattle Storm	1
3	Atlanta Dream	1
6	**Indiana Fever**	**2**

Semifinals: Best-of-5
1	Minnesota Lynx	1
4	**Phoenix Mercury**	**3**
2	**Las Vegas Aces**	**3**
6	Indiana Fever	2

Finals: Best-of-7
4	Phoenix Mercury	0
2	**Las Vegas Aces**	**4**

- **Bold** – Series winner
- Italic – Team with home-court-advantage

== First round ==
=== (1) Minnesota Lynx vs. (8) Golden State Valkyries ===
The top-seeded Minnesota Lynx played the eighth-seeded Golden State Valkyries in the first playoff series. The Lynx entered the post-season as the top overall seed after finishing four games ahead of the Las Vegas Aces and Atlanta Dream. The Lynx finished 6–4 in their final ten games of the regular season. The Golden State Valkyries entered the series as the first expansion team to qualify for the playoffs in their first season. They finished the regular season 5–5 in their final ten games. The regular season series between the two teams finished 4–0 in favor of the Lynx, with two of the games coming in the final three games of the season.

==== Game 1 ====
Golden State started game one of the series strongly, winning the first quarter 28–21. However, they could not sustain their performance, and Minnesota won the second quarter 26–12. Minnesota took a seven-point lead into halftime and did not look back. Minnesota came out of the break and won the third quarter 32–18 and won the fourth quarter 22–14. Minnesota went on to win game one at home by twenty-nine points and improve to 5–0 against Golden State for the season. The Lynx had five players score in double figures and were led by Napheesa Collier, who scored twenty points. Natisha Hiedeman scored eighteen, Kayla McBride scored seventeen, Jessica Shepard scored twelve, and Courtney Williams scored eleven. The Valkyries also had five players score in double figures, and they were led by Veronica Burton and Cecilia Zandalasini who both scored fourteen points. Janelle Salaün added thirteen points, Temi Fagbenle scored twelve, and Kate Martin added eleven points.

ESPN

September 14
1 PM ET

Box score

Golden State Valkyries 72, **Minnesota Lynx** **101**
Scoring by quarter: **28**–21, 12–**26**, 18–**32**, 14–**22**
Pts: Burton, Zandalasini 14; Rebs: Janelle Salaün 6 Asts: Veronica Burton 7	Pts: Napheesa Collier 20; Rebs: Jessica Shepard 8 Asts: Hiedeman, Shepard, Williams 4
**Minnesota leads series, 1–0**

Target Center
Attendance: 8,821
Referees: Jeff Wooten, Tiara Cruse, Kevin Fahy, Gerda Gatling

==== Game 2 ====
Game two saw the series move to California where the Valkyries took advantage of their home court, winning the first quarter 27–19. The second quarter was much lower scoring, with the Valkyries prevailing 14–9. Golden State took a thirteen-point lead into halftime of their first home playoff game in franchise history. The third quarter was the closest of the game, and the Valkyries prevailed 22–21 to lead by fourteen-points heading into the final frame. However, the Lynx mounted an epic comeback and won the final quarter 26–11. Their fifteen-point fourth quarter victory gave them a one-point win in the game. Minnesota trailed by as many as seventeen points during the third quarter and took the lead with just 1:24 left. They secured the series victory 2–0 and advanced to the Semifinals.

The Lynx had four players score in double-figures and were led by Napheesa Collier with twenty-four points. Kayla McBride scored eighteen points, Bridget Carleton added twelve, and DiJonai Carrington scored eleven from the bench. The Valkyries also had four players score in double-digits and were led by Monique Billings who scored fifteen points. Both Janelle Salaün and Cecilia Zandalasini scored fourteen points, and Veronica Burton rounded out the double-digits scorers with thirteen points.

ESPN

September 17
10 PM ET

Box score

**Minnesota Lynx** **75**, Golden State Valkyries 74
Scoring by quarter: 19–**27**, 9–**14**, 21–**22**, **26**–11
Pts: Napheesa Collier 24; Rebs: Napheesa Collier 7 Asts: Hiedeman, Williams 7	Pts: Monique Billings 15; Rebs: Veronica Burton 6 Asts: Veronica Burton 9
**Minnesota wins series, 2–0**

SAP Center
Attendance: 18,543
Referees: Roy Gulbeyan, Gina Cross, Tim Greene, Clare Aubry

Regular-season series
Minnesota won 4–0 in the regular-season series

June 1, 2025

Report

**Minnesota Lynx 86**, Golden State Valkyries 75

Chase Center

July 5, 2025

Report

Golden State Valkyries 71, **Minnesota Lynx 82**

Target Center

September 6, 2025

Report

**Minnesota Lynx 78**, Golden State Valkyries 72

Chase Center

September 11, 2025

Report

Golden State Valkyries 53, **Minnesota Lynx 72**

Target Center

=== (2) Las Vegas Aces vs. (7) Seattle Storm ===
In the second playoff series, the second-seed Las Vegas Aces will play the seventh-seed Seattle Storm. Las Vegas finished four games out of first place during the regular season, and earned the second seed by winning a tiebreaker over Atlanta. Las Vegas enters the series after going 10–0 in their last ten games and having not lost in fourteen games. Seattle finished only one game out of being the sixth seed and won a tiebreaker with Golden State to earn the seventh seed. The Storm finished the regular season 6–4 in their final ten games. The Western Conference teams played four times in the regular season, with the teams splitting the series two games each.

==== Game 1 ====
The Aces used home court to their advantage to begin the game well, winning the first quarter 22–12. The game followed a similar trajectory in the second quarter, as the Aces won the quarter 23–13. The Aces took a twenty-point lead into halftime. The game became closer in the third quarter, but the Aces prevailed again, winning the quarter 31–27. The Aces again won the fourth quarter, 26–25 and won the game by twenty-five points. Five Aces scored in double figures, lead by A'ja Wilson who had twenty-nine points. Jackie Young scored eighteen points, Jewell Loyd scored fourteen, Dana Evans scored thirteen, and NaLyssa Smith added eleven points. The Storm also had five players reach double-figures in points, and were led by Gabby Williams with sixteen points. Both Skylar Diggins and Dominique Malonga scored twelve, Nneka Ogwumike scored eleven, and Erica Wheeler added ten. Malonga added eleven rebounds to record a double-double.

ESPN

September 14
10 PM ET

Box score

Seattle Storm 77, **Las Vegas Aces** **102**
Scoring by quarter: 12–**22**, 13–**23**, 27–**31**, 25–**26**
Pts: Gabby Williams 16; Rebs: Dominique Malonga 11; Asts: Nneka Ogwumike 3	Pts: A'ja Wilson 29; Rebs: NaLyssa Smith 9 Asts: Jackie Young 7
**Las Vegas leads series, 1–0**

Michelob Ultra Arena
Attendance: 10,407
Referees: Tim Greene, Fatou Cissoko-Stephens, Ryan Sassano, Agon Abazi

==== Game 2 ====
Game two started as a close contest, with Las Vegas barely edging out the first quarter 22–21. The second quarter played out similarly, and ended tied 23–23. The Aces held a one-point halftime lead and came out of the break strongly. The Aces locked down on the defensive end, limiting the Storm to seventeen points, and won the quarter 24–17. Las Vegas led by eight points going into the final quarter, but the Storm staged a comeback. They held the Aces to just fourteen points in the fourth, and won the quarter 25–14. Their nine-point quarter win saw them win the game by three points to force a third game in the series. Four Storm players finished scoring double figures, and they were led by Skylar Diggins, who scored twenty-six points. Nneka Ogwumike scored twenty-four points, and both Dominique Malonga and Erica Wheeler added eleven points. The Aces saw three players score in double figures, and were led by Jackie Young with twenty-five points. A'ja Wilson scored twenty-one points, and Jewell Loyd added thirteen. Three players recorded double-doubles in the game. The Storm saw Malonga record her second of the series as she added ten rebounds to her eleven points. Ogwumike also recorded ten rebounds. Wilson had thirteen rebounds for the Aces to complete her double-double.

ESPN

September 16
9:30 PM ET

Box score

Las Vegas Aces 83, **Seattle Storm** **86**
Scoring by quarter: **22**–21, 23–23, **24**–17, 14–**25**
Pts: Jackie Young 25; Rebs: A'ja Wilson 13; Asts: Chelsea Gray 9	Pts: Skylar Diggins 26; Rebs: Malonga, Ogwumike 10; Asts: Skylar Diggins 7
**Series tied, 1–1**

Climate Pledge Arena
Attendance: 12,500
Referees: Tiara Cruse, Isaac Barnett, Ashley Gloss, Gerda Gatling

==== Game 3 ====
Game three started with Seattle winning the first quarter 19–14. However, the Aces played much better in the second quarter and held the Storm to just seven points. The Aces won the quarter 19–7 and took a seven-point lead into halftime. Seattle came out of the break as the stronger team and won the third quarter 22–19 to leave the Aces with just a four-point lead heading into the final quarter. The Storm won the fourth quarter to win three of the four quarters of the game. However, their 25–22 margin in the fourth was not enough to erase the deficit and the Aces won the game by one point. The Aces secured the series victory 2–1 and advanced to the Semifinals.

The Aces had three players score in double-figures and were led by A'ja Wilson who scored thirty-eight points. Jackie Young scored fourteen points and Chelsea Gray added twelve points. The Storm also had three players score in double-digits, and were led by both Nneka Ogwumike and Erica Wheeler, who each scored sixteen points. Skylar Diggins scored thirteen points.

ESPN2

September 18
9:30 PM ET

Box score

Seattle Storm 73, **Las Vegas Aces** **74**
Scoring by quarter: **19**–14, 7–**19**, **22**–19, **25**–22
Pts: Ogwumike, Wheeler 16; Rebs: Nneka Ogwumike 9 Asts: Skylar Diggins 6	Pts: A'ja Wilson 38; Rebs: Kierstan Bell 7 Asts: Chelsea Gray 8
**Las Vegas wins series, 2–1**

Michelob Ultra Arena
Attendance: 10,409
Referees: Eric Brewton, Amy Bonner, Jeff Wooten, Randy Richardson

Regular-season series
Tied 2–2 in the regular-season series

May 25, 2025

Report

Las Vegas Aces 82, **Seattle Storm 102**

Climate Pledge Arena

June 1, 2025

Report

**Las Vegas Aces 75**, Seattle Storm 70

Climate Pledge Arena

June 20, 2025

Report

**Seattle Storm 90**, Las Vegas Aces 83

Michelob Ultra Arena

August 8, 2025

Report

Seattle Storm 86, **Las Vegas Aces 90**

Michelob Ultra Arena

=== (3) Atlanta Dream vs. (6) Indiana Fever ===
The third-seed Atlanta Dream will play the sixth-seed Indiana Fever in the third playoff series. The Dream entered the postseason as the third seed after losing a tiebreaker with the Las Vegas Aces. They finished the regular season four games out of first place, and three games ahead of the fourth-seeded Phoenix Mercury. They finished the season 8–2 in their final ten games. The Fever entered the postseason as the sixth-seed after finishing three games out of fifth place, and one game ahead of seventh place. They finished the regular season 6–4 in their final ten games. The Eastern Conference teams played four times in the regular season, with the teams splitting the series two games each.

==== Game 1 ====
The Fever began the game well and won the first quarter 21–18. Atlanta came back strong in the second quarter, winning 22–12. Therefore, Atlanta took a seven-point lead into halftime. The third quarter was a tight affair, with Indiana winning 20–18, cutting the deficit to five heading into the fourth quarter. Atlanta improved their defensive play and limited the Fever to fifteen points, and won the quarter 22–15. Atlanta won game one by twelve points. Atlanta had four players score in double figures. They were led by Allisha Gray and Rhyne Howard who scored twenty points each, Naz Hillmon scored sixteen points, and Brionna Jones scored twelve. Only two Fever players scored in double figures; Kelsey Mitchell scored twenty-seven and Odyssey Sims added ten. Aliyah Boston reached double-figures in rebounds with twelve.

ABC

September 14
3 PM ET

Box score

Indiana Fever 68, **Atlanta Dream** **80**
Scoring by quarter: **21**–18, 12–**22**, **20**–18, 15–**22**
Pts: Kelsey Mitchell 27; Rebs: Aliyah Boston 12; Asts: Aliyah Boston 5	Pts: Gray, Howard 20; Rebs: Naz Hillmon 9 Asts: Canada, Gray 4
**Atlanta leads series, 1–0**

Gateway Center Arena
Attendance: 3,800
Referees: Roy Gulbeyan, Maj Forsberg, Marcy Williams

==== Game 2 ====
Indiana took advantage of their home court in the second game of the series and won the first quarter 20–14. The two teams were more even in the second quarter, which played out to a 15–15 tie. Indiana came out of halftime as the stronger team and won the third quarter 24–15. Again, the second quarter of the half was the closer quarter, but the Fever prevailed in the fourth 18–16. The Fever won game two by seventeen points to force game three. The Fever had three players score in double figures and were led by Kelsey Mitchell who scored nineteen. Aliyah Boston scored fifteen points, and Natasha Howard added twelve points. The Dream had two players score in double digits: Te-Hina Paopao, who scored eleven points from the bench, and Rhyne Howard who scored ten points.

ESPN

September 16
7:30 PM ET

Box score

Atlanta Dream 60, **Indiana Fever** **77**
Scoring by quarter: 14–**20**, 15–15, 15–**24**, 16–**18**
Pts: Te-Hina Paopao 11; Rebs: Gray, Hillmon 7 Asts: Jordin Canada 6	Pts: Kelsey Mitchell 19; Rebs: Aerial Powers 7 Asts: Mitchell, Sims 4
**Series tied, 1–1**

Gainbridge Fieldhouse
Attendance: 16,682
Referees: Eric Brewton, Angelica Suffren, Randy Richardson, Catherine Chang

==== Game 3 ====
Game three started with a high-scoring first quarter, which Indiana won 29–27. The Dream kept the pace in the second quarter, while Indiana's scoring dropped slightly, and the Dream won the quarter 29–20. The Dream took a seven-point lead into halftime at home. The Fever chipped away at the lead throughout the third quarter and won the frame 20–17 to cut the lead to four heading into the fourth. The Fever limited the Dream to just twelve points in the quarter and were able to win the quarter 18–12. That resulted in a two-point Indiana victory, which saw them take the series two games to one.

All five Indiana starters scored in double-figures and were led by Kelsey Mitchell who scored twenty-four points. Odyssey Sims scored sixteen points, Aliyah Boston scored fourteen points, Natasha Howard scored twelve, and Lexie Hull added ten. The Dream had four players score in double-digits and were led by Allisha Gray who scored nineteen points. Jordin Canada was not far behind with eighteen points, Rhyne Howard scored sixteen, and Brionna Jones scored twelve. Three players recorded double-doubles in the game. The Fever's Aliyah Boston added twelve rebounds to her fourteen points to earn a double-double. The Dream had two players with double-doubles: Allisha Gray added twelve rebounds and Jordin Canada with ten assists. Naz Hillmon finished one point shy of becoming the third Dream player to earn a double-double, as she had nine points and ten rebounds.

ESPN2

September 18
7:30 PM ET

Box score

**Indiana Fever** **87**, Atlanta Dream 85
Scoring by quarter: **29**–27, 20–**29**, **20**–17, **18**–12
Pts: Kelsey Mitchell 24; Rebs: Aliyah Boston 12; Asts: Odyssey Sims 8	Pts: Allisha Gray 19; Rebs: Allisha Gray 12; Asts: Jordin Canada 10
**Indiana wins series, 2–1**

Gateway Center Arena
Attendance: 3,800
Referees: Tiara Cruse, Isaac Barnett, Kevin Fahy

Regular-season series
Tied 2–2 in the regular-season series

May 20, 2025

Report

**Atlanta Dream 91**, Indiana Fever 90

Gainbridge Fieldhouse

May 22, 2025

Report

**Indiana Fever 81**, Atlanta Dream 76

State Farm Arena

June 10, 2025

Report

Indiana Fever 58, **Atlanta Dream 77**

Gateway Center Arena

July 11, 2025

Report

Atlanta Dream 82, **Indiana Fever 99**

Gainbridge Fieldhouse

=== (4) Phoenix Mercury vs. (5) New York Liberty ===
The final first round series will see the fourth-seed Phoenix Mercury play the fifth-seed New York Liberty. The two teams finished tied in the regular season standings, and Phoenix won the tiebreaker to earn home-court advantage for the series. The teams were both three games behind the third seed, and three games ahead of the sixth seed. Both teams enter the post-season having gone 6–4 in their final ten games. The teams played four games in the regular season, and the Mercury won three of the four games.

==== Game 1 ====
Game one began with a low-scoring quarter, which was won by the Liberty 17–13. Offenses came alive in the second quarter and the Mercury won the quarter 30–27. The Liberty took a one-point lead into halftime. The third quarter was another low-scoring affair, with the Mercury winning 14–11. The game sat on a knife's edge heading into the final quarter, with the Mercury holding a two-point lead. The fourth quarter was the lowest scoring of all the quarters, and the Liberty won 10–8 and forced overtime. The Liberty's defense carried through into the overtime period, and the Liberty won overtime 11–4 to take the game one by seven points. Four Liberty players scored in double-figures, and they were led by Natasha Cloud with twenty-three points. Breanna Stewart scored eighteen points, Sabrina Ionescu added sixteen points, and Leonie Fiebich finished with ten points. Jonquel Jones reached double-figures in rebounds with twelve. The Mercury had three players reach double-figures in scoring and were led by Kahleah Copper who scored fifteen. Alyssa Thomas scored fourteen points, and DeWanna Bonner added twelve points.

ESPN

September 14
5 PM ET

Box score

**New York Liberty** **76**, Phoenix Mercury 69 (OT)
Scoring by quarter: **17**–13, 27–**30**, 11–**14**, **10**–8, Overtime: **11**–4
Pts: Natasha Cloud 23; Rebs: Jonquel Jones 12; Asts: Sabrina Ionescu 7	Pts: Kahleah Copper 15; Rebs: Alyssa Thomas 9 Asts: Alyssa Thomas 8
**New York leads series, 1–0**

PHX Arena
Attendance: 10,095
Referees: Eric Brewton, Amy Bonner, Isaac Barnett

==== Game 2 ====
Game two picked up where game one left off as an even affair. The teams tied in the first quarter 25–25. Phoenix improved their defense to flip the script in the second quarter to win 26–12, which allowed them to carry a fourteen-point lead into halftime. Both teams scored fewer points in the third quarter where Phoenix won 18–10. The fourth quarter was another lower scoring affair, which the Mercury won 17–13. The Mercury dominated all but the first quarter to win the game by twenty-six points and force a deciding game three of the series. Their biggest lead was thirty-one during the game.

Phoenix had five players score in double-figures and they were led by Satou Sabally and Alyssa Thomas who both scored fifteen points. DeWanna Bonner and Kahleah Copper both scored fourteen points, and Kathryn Westbeld scored ten points in her second career playoff game. The Liberty had only Emma Meesseman score in double-digits, as she scored eleven points. Jonquel Jones recorded thirteen rebounds but fell short of a double-double as she only scored seven points.

ESPN

September 17
8 PM ET

Box score

**Phoenix Mercury** **86**, New York Liberty 60
Scoring by quarter: 25–25, **26**–12, **18**–10, **17**–13
Pts: Sabally, Thomas 15; Rebs: DeWanna Bonner 8 Asts: Alyssa Thomas 7	Pts: Emma Meesseman 11; Rebs: Jonquel Jones 13; Asts: Ionescu, Meesseman 3
**Series tied, 1–1**

Barclays Center
Attendance: 17,017
Referees: Maj Forsberg, Fatou Cissoko-Stephens, Jenna Reneau, Agon Abazi

==== Game 3 ====
The Mercury got out to a strong start at home, winning the first quarter 22–15. The Liberty staged a comeback during the second quarter and won the quarter 26–23. However, the Liberty didn't erase the complete deficit from the first quarter, and Phoenix took a four-point lead into halftime. New York was the stronger team in the third quarter, winning 18–15 to see the two teams only separated by a point heading into the final quarter. The Mercury finished strong, and won the fourth quarter 19–14 to win the game by six points. The Mercury won both their home games to secure the series two games to one and advance to the semifinals. New York's season ended, and they were unable to defend their title from last year.

Phoenix had four players score in double-figures and were led by Satou Sabally with twenty-three points. Alyssa Thomas scored twenty points, Sami Whitcomb added thirteen points from the bench, and Kahleah Copper scored twelve points. New York had only two players score in double-digits: Breanna Stewart with thirty points, and Sabrina Ionescu with twenty-two points. Sabally earned a double-double by virtue of added twelve rebounds. Thomas recorded the seventh ever playoff triple-double, and her fifth, by added eleven rebounds and eleven assists.

ESPN2

September 19
9:30 p.m.

Box score

New York Liberty 73, **Phoenix Mercury** **79**
Scoring by quarter: 15–**22**, **26**–23, **18**–15, 14–**19**
Pts: Breanna Stewart 30; Rebs: Breanna Stewart 9 Asts: Ionescu, Jones 4	Pts: Satou Sabally 23; Rebs: Satou Sabally 12; Asts: Alyssa Thomas 11
**Phoenix wins series, 2–1**

PHX Arena
Attendance: 13,104
Referees: Roy Gulbeyan, Gina Cross, Tim Greene

Regular-season series
Phoenix won 3–1 in the regular-season series

June 19, 2025

Report

**Phoenix Mercury 89**, New York Liberty 81

Barclays Center

June 27, 2025

Report

New York Liberty 91, **Phoenix Mercury 106**

PHX Arena

July 25, 2025

Report

Phoenix Mercury 76, **New York Liberty 89**

Barclays Center

August 30, 2025

Report

New York Liberty 63, **Phoenix Mercury 80**

PHX Arena

== Semifinals ==
=== (1) Minnesota Lynx vs. (4) Phoenix Mercury ===
The top seed Minnesota Lynx and fourth seed Phoenix Mercury faced-off in the first semifinal series. The Lynx entered the series having swept their first round series, while the Mercury needed all three games to eliminate the New York Liberty. The teams met four times during the regular season and the Lynx won three of the games while Phoenix won one. The teams have not played since before the All-Star Break.

==== Game 1 ====
Game one began as a tight affair, with Phoenix winning the first quarter 24–22. The Mercury extended their lead in the second quarter, winning the frame 23–18 to take a seven-point lead into halftime. Minnesota's defense played much better after the intermission, limiting the Mercury to just twelve points in the third quarter. The Lynx won that quarter 19–12 to eliminate the halftime lead and leave the game tied heading into the fourth. Minnesota used their home court advantage to dominate the fourth quarter, 23–10. The Lynx took game one by a margin of thirteen points.

Minnesota had three players score in double-figures and were led by Courtney Williams who scored twenty-three points. Kayla McBride added twenty-one points and Napheesa Collier finished with eighteen. The Mercury had four players score in double-digits, and all other players scored just eight points for the team. They were led by Kahleah Copper with twenty-two points, Alyssa Thomas added eighteen points, Sami Whitcomb scored eleven points off the bench, and Satou Sabally scored ten points.

ESPN

September 21
5 PM ET

Box score

Phoenix Mercury 69, **Minnesota Lynx** **82**
Scoring by quarter: **24**–22, **23**–18, 12–**19**, 10–**23**
Pts: Kahleah Copper 22; Rebs: DeWanna Bonner 9 Asts: Alyssa Thomas 7	Pts: Courtney Williams 23; Rebs: Napheesa Collier 9 Asts: Courtney Williams 7
**Minnesota leads series, 1–0**

Target Center
Attendance: 10,121
Referees: Eric Brewton, Angelica Suffren, Maj Forsberg, Jeff Wooten

==== Game 2 ====
Game two started off as a close contest with the Lynx winning the first quarter 21–19. Minnesota expanded their lead in the second quarter, winning the quarter 27–13. The Lynx enjoyed a sixteen-point lead at halftime. They came out of the break and started to extend their lead, which was twenty points at its peak. However, Phoenix went on a 12–0 run in the third quarter to cut the lead to eight. At the end of the third quarter, Phoenix came out on top 22–14. This left the lead at eight points heading into the fourth. The Mercury continued to whittle away at the lead throughout the fourth and Sami Whitcomb hit a three pointer with four second remaining to tie the game. Napheesa Collier had a shot at the buzzer to win, but it fell short and the game went into overtime. The Mercury won the fourth quarter 25–17. In the overtime period, Phoenix scored the first seven points and ended up winning 10–4. That gave them a six-point game win and they tied the series at one game a piece.

Phoenix had just three players score in double-figures and were led by Satou Sabally with twenty-four points. Alyssa Thomas scored nineteen points and Sami Whitcomb added thirteen from the bench. The Lynx had four players score in double-digits and only had two other players score in the game. They were led by Napheesa Coller who also scored twenty-four points. Kayla McBride scored twenty-one points, Courtney Williams added twenty points, and Alanna Smith scored thirteen. Alyssa Thomas earned her second double-double of the playoffs by recording thirteen assists in the game.

ESPN

September 23
7:30 PM ET

Box score

**Phoenix Mercury** **89**, Minnesota Lynx 83 (OT)
Scoring by quarter: 19–**21**, 13–**27**, **22**–14, **25**–14, Overtime: 10–4
Pts: Satou Sabally 24; Rebs: Satou Sabally 9 Asts: Alyssa Thomas 13	Pts: Napheesa Collier 24; Rebs: Alanna Smith 9 Asts: Courtney Williams 9
**Series tied, 1–1**

Target Center
Attendance: 10,824
Referees: Roy Gulbeyan, Tim Greene, Ryan Sassano, Ashley Gloss

==== Game 3 ====
Game three started with the Lynx edging the first quarter 22–19. The second quarter was a much more high-scoring affair, with the Mercury winning 29–22. The Mercury took a four point lead into the home locker rooms at half time. The Lynx however, came out as the better team in the third quarter and won 23–15 to take their own four point lead into the fourth and final quarter. The Mercury played lock-down defense in the fourth, limiting the Lynx to just nine points. Phoenix scored twenty-one of their own points to win the fourth quarter by twelve points and the game by eight points. The Mercury took a two games to one series lead and are now just one game away from reaching the Finals.

The Mercury had three players score in double-figures. Satou Sabally led the way with twenty-three points and both Alyssa Thomas and Kahleah Copper scored twenty-one points. Sabally scored fifteen of her twenty-three in the fourth to seal the game. The Lynx had four players reach double-digits and were led by Natisha Hiedeman, who scored nineteen points from the bench. Napheesa Collier scored seventeen, Courtney Williams scored fourteen, and Kayla McBride added twelve points.

ESPN2

September 26
9:30 PM ET

Box score

Minnesota Lynx 76, **Phoenix Mercury** **84**
Scoring by quarter: **22**–19, 22–**29**, **23**–15, 9–**21**
Pts: Natisha Hiedeman 19; Rebs: Collier, Kliundikova 6 Asts: Kayla McBride 5	Pts: Satou Sabally 23; Rebs: Alyssa Thomas 9 Asts: Alyssa Thomas 8
**Phoenix leads series, 2–1**

PHX Arena
Attendance: 15,941
Referees: Isaac Barnett, Jenna Reneau, Randy Richardson

==== Game 4 ====
The Minnesota Lynx started game four strongly, winning the first quarter 25–14. However, Phoenix clawed its way back in the second quarter and took the frame 24–13. This left the game tied at the half. The second half was again a tale of two quarters as the Lynx won the third quarter 30–17. The Mercury faced a thirteen point deficit heading into the final frame. They erased the lead and surpassed the Lynx 31–13 in the quarter to win the game by five points. Their win resulted in a series win, three games to one. The Lynx could not overcome star Napheesa Collier's absence and were eliminated from the playoffs.

The Mercury had four players score in double-figures and were led by Alyssa Thomas who scored twenty-three points. Satou Sabally scored twenty-one points, and both Kahleah Copper and DeWanna Bonner added thirteen points. Thomas recorded her third double-double of the playoffs by adding ten assists. The Lynx had three players reach double-digits and were led by Kayla McBride who scored thirty-one points. Courtney Williams added twenty points and Jessica Shepard scored fourteen.

ESPN

September 28
8:00 PM ET

Box score

Minnesota Lynx 81, **Phoenix Mercury** **86**
Scoring by quarter: **25**–14, 13–**24**, **30**–17, 13–**31**
Pts: Kayla McBride 31; Rebs: Alanna Smith 8 Asts: Courtney Williams 6	Pts: Alyssa Thomas 23; Rebs: Alyssa Thomas 8 Asts: Alyssa Thomas 10
**Phoenix wins series, 3–1**

PHX Arena
Attendance: 16,919
Referees: Roy Gulbeyan, Amy Bonner, Fatou Cissoko-Stephens

Regular-season series
Minnesota won 3–1 in the regular-season series

May 30, 2025

Report

**Minnesota Lynx 74**, Phoenix Mercury 71

PHX Arena

June 3, 2025

Report

Phoenix Mercury 65, **Minnesota Lynx 88**

Target Center

July 9, 2025

Report

Minnesota Lynx 71, **Phoenix Mercury 79**

PHX Arena

July 16, 2025

Report

Phoenix Mercury 66, **Minnesota Lynx 79**

Target Center

=== (2) Las Vegas Aces vs. (6) Indiana Fever ===
The second seed Las Vegas Aces and the sixth seed Indiana Fever faced-off in the second semifinal series. Both teams entered the series having won their first round series two games to one. The Fever entered the series as the only Eastern Conference team remaining in the playoffs. The two teams met only three times during the regular season, and the Fever won two of those games. The teams have not played since July 24, a ten-point Indiana home win.

==== Game 1 ====
Game one started as a close affair, with the Fever edging out the first quarter 19–18. The Fever won the second quarter as well, increasing their margin slightly to win 22–18. The Fever took a five-point lead into the road locker room at halftime. The Fever came out of the break on a scoring streak, winning the third quarter 28–19. The Aces could not used home court to their advantage as they also lost the fourth quarter 18–20. Indiana won the same by sixteen points, winning each quarter.

The Fever had three players score in double-figures and were led by Kelsey Mitchell who scored thirty-four points. Odyssey Sims scored seventeen points and Natasha Howard added twelve points. The Aces had four players score in double-digits and were led by Jackie Young who scored nineteen points. A'ja Wilson scored sixteen points, Dana Evans added fourteen points, and Chelsea Gray scored thirteen points. Two players scored double-doubles in the game. Wilson recorded her second of the playoffs for the Aces by added thirteen rebounds to her sixteen points. Howard added eleven rebounds to her twelve points to record her first double-double of the playoffs.

ABC

September 21
3 PM ET

Box score

**Indiana Fever** **89**, Las Vegas Aces 73
Scoring by quarter: **19**–18, **22**–18, **28**–19, **20**–18
Pts: Kelsey Mitchell 34; Rebs: Boston, Howard 11; Asts: Aliyah Boston 5	Pts: Jackie Young 19; Rebs: A'ja Wilson 13; Asts: Chelsea Gray 4
**Indiana leads series, 1–0**

Michelob Ultra Arena
Attendance: 10,409
Referees: Amy Bonner, Gina Cross, Isaac Barnett, Ashley Gloss

==== Game 2 ====
The Aces got off to a strong start in game two of the series, winning the first quarter 26–17. The second quarter was a closer affair, but the Aces still came out on top 20–18. The Aces took and eleven point lead into the break. They came out of the break and continued their dominating play, winning the third quarter by seven points, 24–17. The Aces completed the game winning all four quarters and they won the fourth 20–16. Overall, Las Vegas took game two by twenty-two points to tie the series at one game a piece.

The Aces had five players score in double-figures and were led by A'ja Wilson who scored twenty-five points. NaLyssa Smith scored eighteen, Jackie Young added thirteen, and both Jewell Loyd and Dana Evans added ten points from the bench. Chelsea Gray finished in double-figures in another statistic with ten assists. The Fever had four players reach double figures and were led by Odyssey Sims who scored eighteen points. Lexie Hull scored fifteen points, Kelsey Mitchell scored thirteen points, and Aliyah Boston added ten points. Boston earned her second double-double of these playoffs by added thirteen rebounds.

ESPN

September 23
9:30 PM ET

Box score

Indiana Fever 68, **Las Vegas Aces** **90**
Scoring by quarter: 17–**26**, 18–**20**, 17–**24**, 16–**20**
Pts: Odyssey Sims 18; Rebs: Aliyah Boston 13; Asts: Odyssey Sims 7	Pts: A'ja Wilson 25; Rebs: A'ja Wilson 9 Asts: Chelsea Gray 10
**Series tied, 1–1**

Michelob Ultra Arena
Attendance: 10,516
Referees: Jeff Wooten, Fatou Cissoko-Stephens, Kevin Fahy, Marcy Williams

==== Game 3 ====
The Aces started game three on the road with a first quarter victory, 20–16. The Fever rebounded in the second quarter, and won 18–15. This meant Las Vegas took a one point lead into the halftime break. The game continued to be a close one during the third quarter and it resulted in the Aces winning 24–22 to lead by three going into the fourth. The Aces found another gear and won the fourth quarter 25–16. They finished the game with their biggest lead of the game, which was twelve points. The Aces' road victory left them one win away from a Finals berth.

The Aces had five players reach double-figures and only had one other player score points in the game. The leading scorer was Jackie Young, who scored twenty-five points. NaLyssa Smith added sixteen points, Chelsea Gray scored fifteen, A'ja Wilson scored thirteen, and Dana Evans scored ten from the bench. Indiana had just three players score in double-digits and were led by Kelsey Mitchell who scored twenty-one points. Lexie Hull added sixteen, and Aliyah Boston scored twelve. Lexie Hull scored her first career playoff double-double by adding ten rebounds.

ESPN2

September 26
7:30 PM ET

Box score

**Las Vegas Aces** **84**, Indiana Fever 72
Scoring by quarter: **20**–16, 15–**18**, **24**–22, **25**–16
Pts: Jackie Young 25; Rebs: A'ja Wilson 8 Asts: Chelsea Gray 6	Pts: Kelsey Mitchell 21; Rebs: Lexie Hull 10; Asts: Boston, Hull 4
**Las Vegas leads series, 2–1**

Gainbridge Fieldhouse
Attendance: 16,507
Referees: Roy Gulbeyan, Eric Brewton, Tiara Cruse, Tiara Cruse

==== Game 4 ====
Game four started as a tight affair and the Fever edged out a victory in the first quarter 23–21. The Fever kept the pace in the second quarter, again scoring 23 points, however they held Las Vegas to seventeen points. Therefore, the Fever took an eight point lead into the half. The Aces emerged from the break as the slightly better team, and they won the quarter 24–21. The Fever held a slight five point advantage going into the final quarter. The game stayed tight, but the Fever won the quarter 23–21 to win the game by seven points. The Fever's win forced a deciding game five to be played in Las Vegas.

The Fever had three players score in double-figures and were led by Kelsey Mitchell who scored twenty-five points. Aliyah Boston scored twenty-four points and Odyssey Sims added eighteen points. Boston recorded her third double-double of these playoffs by adding fourteen rebounds. The Aces also had three players score in double-figures and were led by A'ja Wilson who scored thirty-one points. Jackie Young scored eighteen points and Chelsea Gray added twelve points.

ABC

September 28
3 PM ET

Preview

Las Vegas Aces 83, **Indiana Fever** **90**
Scoring by quarter: 21–**23**, 17–**23**, **24**–21, 21–**23**
Pts: A'ja Wilson 31; Rebs: A'ja Wilson 9 Asts: Gray, Young 9	Pts: Kelsey Mitchell 25; Rebs: Aliyah Boston 14; Asts: Aliyah Boston 5
**Series tied, 2–2**

Gainbridge Fieldhouse
Attendance: 16,022
Referees: Jeff Wooten, Isaac Barnett, Jenna Reneau, Randy Richardson

==== Game 5 ====
The final game of the series began as even as the series had been to this point, as the teams tied 23–23 in the first quarter. The second quarter continued to prove a close matchup and the Aces edged out the quarter 24–22 to take a two point lead into the halftime break. Las Vegas came out of the half and continued their scoring pace, as they again scored twenty-four points in the quarter. However, they held Indiana to just eighteen points. Therefore the Aces held an eight point lead going into the fourth quarter. Indiana would not go down without a fight, and staged a furious comeback in the fourth. The Fever won the quarter 23–15 to completely erase the deficit and force overtime. The Aces found their scoring groove again, and dominated the overtime period 21–12. The Aces won the game by nine points, their largest lead of the game. They won the series three games to two and advanced to their third WNBA Finals in four years.

The Aces had just three players reach double-figures despite scoring over one hundred points in the game. They were led by A'ja Wilson who scored thirty-five points. Jackie Young did not trail the leader by much as she scored thirty-two points, and Chelsea Gray added seventeen points. Young recorded her first double-double of the playoffs by added ten assists. The Fever had six players score in double-digits and were led by Odyssey Sims who scored twenty-seven points. Natasha Howard scored sixteen points, Kelsey Mitchell scored fifteen, Shey Peddy scored thirteen off the bench, Lexie Hull added twelve, and Aliyah Boston scored eleven. Boston recorded her fourth double-double of these playoffs by recording sixteen rebounds.

ESPN2

September 30
9:30 pm ET

Box score

Indiana Fever 98, **Las Vegas Aces** **107** (OT)
Scoring by quarter: 23–23, 22–**24**, 18–**24**, **23**–15, Overtime: 12–**21**
Pts: Odyssey Sims 27; Rebs: Aliyah Boston 16; Asts: Odyssey Sims 6	Pts: A'ja Wilson 35; Rebs: A'ja Wilson 7 Asts: Jackie Young 10
**Las Vegas wins series, 3–2**

Michelob Ultra Arena
Attendance: 10,529
Referees: Roy Gulbeyan, Isaac Barnett, Fatou Cissoko-Stephens, Kevin Fahy

Regular-season series
Indiana won 2–1 in the regular-season series

June 22, 2025

Report

Indiana Fever 81, **Las Vegas Aces 89**

T-Mobile Arena

July 3, 2025

Report

Las Vegas Aces 54, **Indiana Fever 81**

Gainbridge Fieldhouse

July 24, 2025

Report

Las Vegas Aces 70, **Indiana Fever 80**

Gainbridge Fieldhouse

== WNBA Finals ==
=== (2) Las Vegas Aces vs. (4) Phoenix Mercury ===
==== Game 1 ====
Game one of the Finals started as a close affair with the Aces responding to an early Mercury lead. The first quarter ended tied at 21. Both teams continued to go back-and-forth in the second quarter but Phoenix came out on top 29–24. Kahleah Copper scored 19 points in the first half, and broke the WNBA record for most three-pointers in a half with five. The third quarter continued to be close, and the Aces won 22–21, to cut the Mercury's lead to four points heading into the fourth quarter. A'ja Wilson scored 12 points over the final 14 minutes to lead the Aces' comeback. Alyssa Thomas missed two free-throws with 24.6 seconds left, while Jackie Young made two free-throws with 13.5 seconds left. Satou Sabally couldn't sink a long three-point attempt with two seconds left to leave the Aces with a 22–15 fourth quarter victory. Their seven point quarter win meant they won the game by three points. The game was close throughout, with 12 lead changes and nine ties.

The Aces had four players score in double-figures. They were jointly led by Dana Evans and Wilson, who both scored 21 points. Evans' points all came off the bench. Jewell Loyd scored 18 points, also from the bench, and Young scored 10. Chelsea Gray recorded 10 assists and Wilson completed her third double-double of the playoffs by adding 10 rebounds. The Mercury had five players in double-digits and were led by Copper who scored 21. Sabally scored 19 points, Thomas added 15, Monique Akoa Makani scored 11, and DeWanna Bonner added 10 off the bench. Thomas recorded her fourth double-double of the playoffs by adding 10 rebounds. The Aces' bench outscored the Mercury's 41–16.

ESPN

October 3
8 PM ET

Box Score

Phoenix Mercury 86, **Las Vegas Aces** **89**
Scoring by quarter: 21–21, **29**–24, 21–**22**, 15–**22**
Pts: Kahleah Copper 21; Rebs: Alyssa Thomas 10; Asts: Alyssa Thomas 9	Pts: Evans, Wilson 21; Rebs: A'ja Wilson 10; Asts: Chelsea Gray 10
**Las Vegas leads series, 1–0**

Michelob Ultra Arena
Attendance: 10,266
Referees: Eric Brewton
Randy Richardson
Jenna Reneau

==== Game 2 ====
Game two began as close as game one had been with the teams going back and forth. It was a high-scoring quarter, which the Mercury won 27–24. The Aces' improved their defensive play during the second quarter and limited the Mercury to just ten points. The Aces won the quarter 22–10 and took a nine-point lead into halftime. Coming out of the half, both teams played well on offense and scored a total of fifty-four points in the quarter. Las Vegas prevailed 30–24 to expand their lead to fifteen points. The fourth quarter was lower scoring, finishing 17–15 in favor of the Mercury. The result didn't put much of a dent in the Aces lead, and Las Vegas took the game by thirteen points. They won both home games to go up in the series two games to zero.

The Aces had three players score in double-figures and were led by Jackie Young who scored thirty-two points, to include setting a WNBA Finals record for most points in a quarter (twenty-one in the 3rd quarter). A'ja Wilson scored twenty-eight points, and Chelsea Gray added ten points. The Mercury also had three players score in double-digits and were led by Kahleah Copper with twenty-three points. Satou Sabally scored twenty-two points, and Alyssa Thomas added ten points. Natasha Mack reached double figures in rebounds with ten. Chelsea Gray recorded a double-double by adding ten assists to go with her ten points. A'ja Wilson also recorded her fourth double-double of the playoffs by grabbing fourteen assists.

ABC

October 5
3 PM ET

Box Score

Phoenix Mercury 78, **Las Vegas Aces** **91**
Scoring by quarter: **27**–24, 10–**22**, 24–**30,** 17–15
Pts: Kahleah Copper 23; Rebs: Natasha Mack 10; Asts: Monique Akoa Makani 7	Pts: Jackie Young 32; Rebs: A'ja Wilson 14; Asts: Chelsea Gray 10
**Las Vegas leads series, 2–0**

Michelob Ultra Arena
Attendance: 10,404
Referees: Angelica Suffren
Maj Forsberg
Isaac Barnett
Kevin Fahy

==== Game 3 ====
The first quarter was a quarter of runs with the Aces going on a 17–0 run which the Mercury followed with a 13–0 run. The quarter ended 26–23 in favor of the Aces. The Aces continued their strong play and won the second quarter 29–20 to take a twelve point lead into halftime. They came out of the break well and won the third quarter 21–16 and extended their lead to seventeen points heading into the fourth. However, Phoenix fought back and close the gap to just one point with 3:06 left after Kahleah Copper made a three-pointer. With under two minutes there were two ties, but A'ja Wilson made a turnaround jumper with 0.3 seconds left to seal the game. Phoenix won the fourth quarter 29–14, but lost the game by two points. Las Vegas now holds a three games to zero lead, and will need to win just one more game to take the title.

The Aces had four players score in double-figures and were led by A'ja Wilson who scored thirty-four points. Jackie Young added twenty-one points, Jewell Loyd scored sixteen off the bench, and Chelsea Gray added eleven points. Wilson recorded her fifth double-double in this years playoffs, and third straight in the Finals, by adding fourteen rebounds. The Mercury had four players score in double-digits and were led by DeWanna Bonner who scored twenty-five points from the bench. Satou Sabally scored twenty-four points, Kahleah Copper added seventeen, and Alyssa Thomas scored fourteen points. The Mercury had two players record double-doubles in the game. Bonner added ten rebounds to earn one, and Alyssa Thomas earned the other with twelve rebounds. Thomas finished one assist shy of a triple double.

ESPN

October 8
8 PM ET

Box Score

**Las Vegas Aces** **90**, Phoenix Mercury 88
Scoring by quarter: **26**–23, **29**–20, **21**–16, 14–**29**
Pts: A'ja Wilson 34; Rebs: A'ja Wilson 14; Asts: Jackie Young 9	Pts: DeWanna Bonner 25; Rebs: Alyssa Thomas 12; Asts: Alyssa Thomas 9
**Las Vegas leads series, 3–0**

Mortgage Matchup Center
Attendance: 17,071
Referees: Fatou Cissoko-Stephens
Tiara Cruse
Amy Bonner

==== Game 4 ====
The Aces started game four strongly, winning the first quarter 30–21. They continued their dominance into the second quarter, where they won the quarter 24–17. They would take a sixteen point lead into halftime. They extended the lead to twenty in the third quarter, but Phoenix won the quarter 24–22 to cut the lead to fourteen points heading into the final quarter. The Mercury started the quarter on an 8–0 run to cut the deficit to 76–70. However, the Aces did not allow the game to get any closer than that. Phoenix won the final frame 24–21 but it was not nearly enough. The Aces won the game by eleven points and finished the first ever best-of-seven series with a four games to zero sweep.

The Aces had six players finish in double-figures and were led by Finals MVP A'ja Wilson who scored thirty-one points. Wilson only made seven field goals, but converted seventeen of her nineteen free throws. Jackie Young and Chelsea Gray each added eighteen points, Jewell Loyd had twelve points and Dana Evans scored ten points. The Mercury had five players finish in double-digits and they were led by Kahleah Copper with thirty points. Alyssa Thomas scored seventeen points, and DeWanna Bonner, Monique Akoa Makani, and Kalani Brown all scored ten points. Bonner recorded her second straight double-double by adding ten rebounds. Alyssa Thomas recorded her sixth double-double and second triple-double of the playoffs by adding twelve rebounds and ten assists.

ESPN

October 10
8 PM ET

Box Score

**Las Vegas Aces** **97**, Phoenix Mercury 86
Scoring by quarter: **30**–21, **24**–17, 22–**24**, 21–**24**
Pts: A'ja Wilson 31; Rebs: A'ja Wilson 9 Asts: Jackie Young 8	Pts: Kahleah Copper 30; Rebs: Alyssa Thomas 12; Asts: Alyssa Thomas 10
**Las Vegas wins series, 4–0**

Mortgage Matchup Center
Attendance: 17,071
Referees: Roy Gulbeyan
Gina Cross
Tim Greene
Jeff Wooten

Regular-season series
Las Vegas won 3–1 in the regular-season series

June 15, 2025

Report

**Phoenix Mercury 76**, Las Vegas Aces 70

Michelob Ultra Arena

June 29, 2025

Report

**Las Vegas Aces 84**, Phoenix Mercury 81

PHX Arena

August 15, 2025

Report

**Las Vegas Aces 86**, Phoenix Mercury 83

PHX Arena

August 21, 2025

Report

Phoenix Mercury 61, **Las Vegas Aces 83**

Michelob Ultra Arena
