= Kathryn Westbeld =

American basketball player (born 1996)

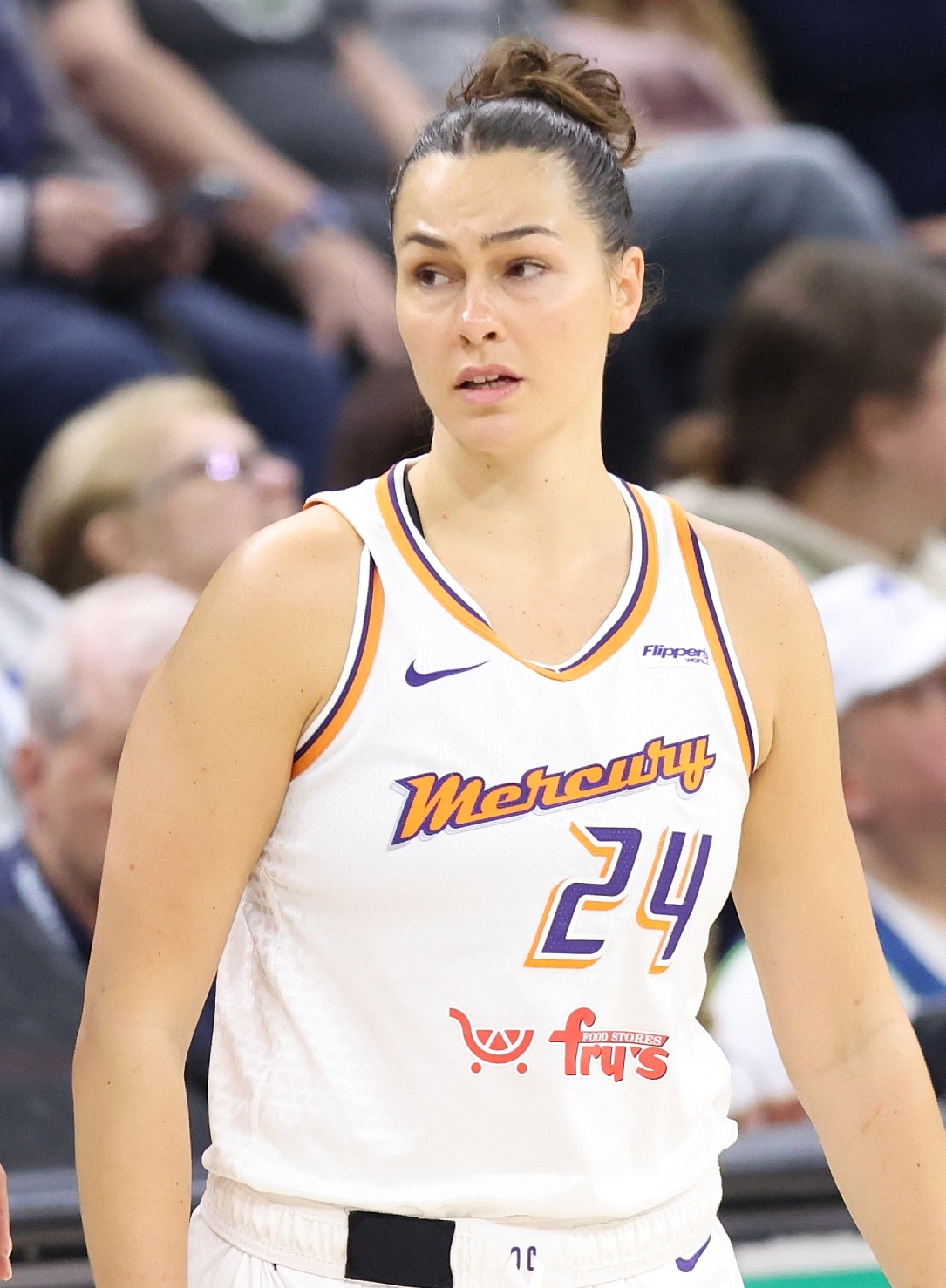
- Westbeld with the Phoenix Mercury in 2025

Phoenix Mercury
- Position: Forward
- League: WNBA

Personal information
- Born: January 29, 1996 (age 30) Kettering, Ohio, U.S.
- Listed height: 6 ft 3 in (1.91 m)

Career information
- High school: Fairmont (Kettering, Ohio)
- College: Notre Dame (2014–2018)
- WNBA draft: 2018: undrafted
- Playing career: 2019–present

Career history
- 2019–2020: Adelaide Lightning
- 2024–2025: KSC Szekszárd
- 2025–present: Phoenix Mercury

Career highlights
- NCAA champion (2018)
- Stats at Basketball Reference

Kathryn Westbeld (born January 29, 1996) is an American professional basketball player for the Phoenix Mercury of the Women's National Basketball Association (WNBA). She previously played for the Adelaide Lightning of the Women's National Basketball League (WNBL). She played college basketball at Notre Dame.

== High school career ==
Westbeld attended Fairmont High School in Kettering, Ohio. During her career she helped lead Fairmont to a 96–11 overall record and four Greater Western Ohio Conference titles. She recorded 15.2 points, 9.3 rebounds, 2.6 assists and 1.6 blocks with a .598 field-goal percentage. She holds school records for rebounds in a game (21) and season (275), as well as field goal percentage in a season (.663). She was ranked the No. 4 forward in the nation, and the No. 21 overall player in the Class of 2014 by ESPN. On October 21, 2013, she committed to play college basketball at Notre Dame.

== College career ==
During the 2014–15 season, in her freshman year, she appeared in all 39 games, and averaged 6.7 points, 4.4 rebounds and 1.0 steals per game with .526 field-goal percentage and one double-double. She tied Natalie Achonwa's program record for most games played by a freshman. During the 2015–16 season, in her sophomore year, she started all 33 games, and averaged 7.9 points and 5.6 rebounds per game. She scored in double figures in 13 games with one double-double. During the 2016–17 season, in her junior year, she appeared in 32 games, with 27 starts, and averaged 8.4 points and 5.3 rebounds per game. During the 2017–18 season, in her senior year, she appeared in 37 games, with 31 starts, and averaged 7.7 points and 5.6 rebounds per game. She helped the Fighting Irish win the 2018 NCAA championship.

== Professional career ==
On April 30, 2018, Westbeld signed a training camp contract with the Los Angeles Sparks. On November 17, 2019, she signed with the Adelaide Lightning of the WNBL. After taking some time off from basketball in 2020 and 2021, Westbeld returned to playing professionally in Puerto Rico in August 2021, followed by stints in France, Italy and then in Hungary for KSC Szekszárd where she averaged 18.7 points and 8.4 rebounds per game.

On February 10, 2025, she signed a training camp contract with the Phoenix Mercury. On May 15, 2025, she was named to the Mercury's final roster for the 2025 WNBA season.

== Personal life ==
Westbeld was born to Susan and Jim Westbeld. Her younger sister, Maddy, also played college basketball at Notre Dame and currently plays for the Chicago Sky of the WNBA. Westbeld and her sister are the only sisters to ever reach 1,000 points in a Notre Dame uniform.

== Career statistics ==
Legend
GP	Games played	GS	Games started	MPG	Minutes per game	FG%	Field goal percentage
3P%	3-point field goal percentage	FT%	Free throw percentage	RPG	Rebounds per game	APG	Assists per game
SPG	Steals per game	BPG	Blocks per game	TO	Turnovers per game	PPG	Points per game
**Bold**	Career high	*	Led Division I	°	Led the league	‡	WNBA record

=== WNBA ===
==== Regular season ====
Stats current through the 2025 season

WNBA regular season statistics
Year	Team	GP	GS	MPG	FG%	3P%	FT%	RPG	APG	SPG	BPG	TO	PPG
2025	Phoenix	43	24	18.4	.358	.321	.781	2.5	0.9	0.8	0.6	0.6	5.1
**Career**	1 year, 1 team	43	24	18.4	.358	.321	.781	2.5	0.9	0.8	0.6	0.6	5.1

==== Playoffs ====
WNBA playoff statistics
Year	Team	GP	GS	MPG	FG%	3P%	FT%	RPG	APG	SPG	BPG	TO	PPG
2025	Phoenix	11	0	11.6	.433	.375	.000	2.4	0.5	0.7	0.1	0.4	3.2
**Career**	1 year, 1 team	11	0	11.6	.433	.375	.000	2.4	0.5	0.7	0.1	0.4	3.2

=== College ===
Legend
GP	Games played	GS	Games started	MPG	Minutes per game	RPG	Rebounds per game
APG	Assists per game	SPG	Steals per game	BPG	Blocks per game	PPG	Points per game
TO	Turnovers per game	FG%	Field-goal percentage	3P%	3-point field-goal percentage	FT%	Free-throw percentage
**Bold**	Career best	°	League leader

Year	Team	GP	GS	MPG	FG%	3P%	FT%	RPG	APG	SPG	BPG	TO	PPG
2014–15	Notre Dame	**39**	0	17.3	52.6	**41.2**	71.1	4.4	1.6	**1.0**	0.3	1.7	6.7
2015–16	Notre Dame	33	**33**	20.7	52.8	14.3	76.2	**5.6**	2.0	0.7	**0.4**	1.5	7.9
2016–17	Notre Dame	32	27	23.7	58.7	22.2	70.6	5.3	**2.4**	0.9	**0.4**	1.5	**8.4**
2017–18	Notre Dame	37	31	**26.3**	**59.2**	30.8	**80.0**	**5.6**	2.0	0.9	0.3	**1.3**	7.7
Career		141	91	21.9	55.8	29.4	74.4	5.2	2.0	0.9	0.3	1.5	7.6
Statistics retrieved from Sports-Reference.
