= 2023 Athletes Unlimited Basketball season =

2023 AU Basketball Season
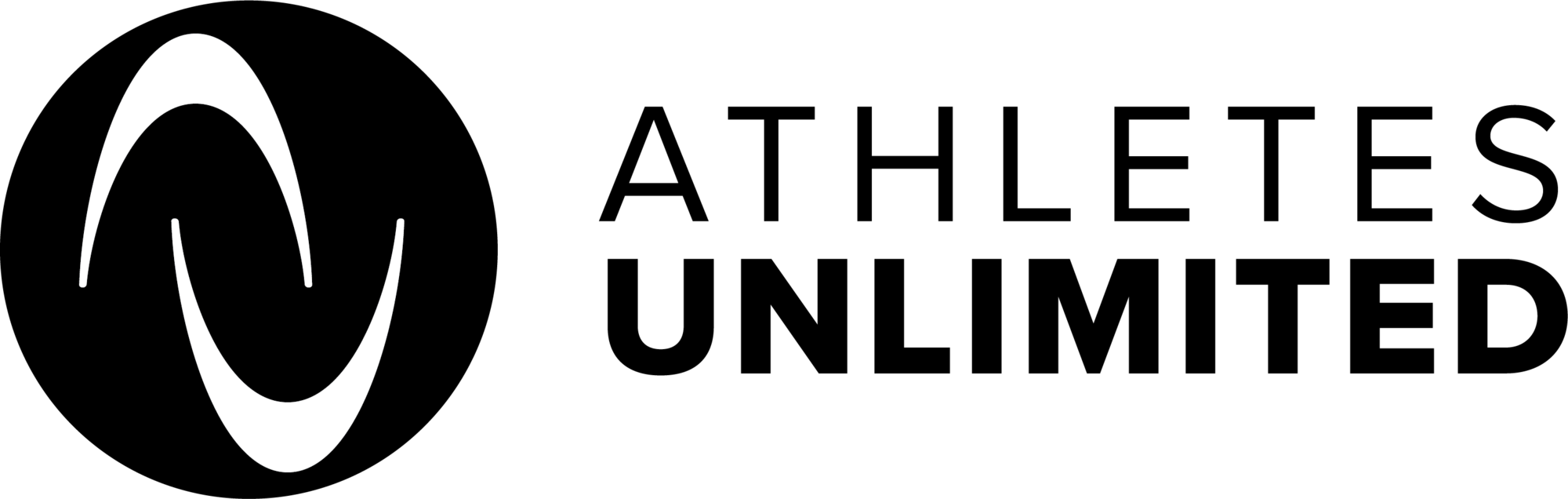
- League: Athletes Unlimited Basketball
- Sport: Basketball
- Duration: February 22 - March 25
- TV partner(s): CBS Sports Network, YouTube
- Season champions: NaLyssa Smith

Seasons
- ← 2022 2024 →

The 2023 Season will be the Athletes Unlimited Basketball's second in existence. The season will be played in Dallas, Texas and will run from February 22 to March 25. The format in which teams are redrafted each week allows athletes to accumulate points for both individual and team performances, culminating with one individual winner.

== Players ==
Name	Position	College	2023 Current Team
CC Andrews	Guard	Saint Joseph's	
Antoinette Bannister	Guard/Forward	East Carolina	Partizani (Albania)
Kristi Bellock	Forward	Texas A&M	H. Petah Tikva (Israel)
Kierstan Bell	Forward	Florida Gulf Coast	Las Vegas Aces
Crystal Bradford	Guard	Central Michigan	
Lexie Brown	Guard	Duke	Los Angeles Sparks
Kirby Burkholder	Guard	James Madison	
Veronica Burton	Guard	Northwestern	Dallas Wings
Jordin Canada	Guard	UCLA	Los Angeles Sparks
DiJonai Carrington	Guard/Forward	Stanford/Baylor	Connecticut Sun
Essence Carson	Guard	Rutgers	
Layshia Clarendon	Guard	California	Los Angeles Sparks
Natasha Cloud	Guard	Saint Joseph's	Washington Mystics
Taj Cole	Guard	Georgia	
Sydney Colson	Guard	Texas A&M	Las Vegas Aces
G'mrice Davis	Forward	Fordham	
Hope Elam	Forward	Indiana	
Allisha Gray	Guard	South Carolina	Atlanta Dream
Rebecca Harris	Forward	Illinois	
Isabelle Harrison	Guard	Tennessee	Los Angeles Sparks
Air Hearn	Guard	Memphis	
Naz Hillmon	Forward	Michigan	Atlanta Dream
Mya Hollingshed	Forward	Colorado	
Lexie Hull	Guard	Stanford	Indiana Fever
Meme Jackson	Guard/Forward	Tennessee	
N'dea Jones	Forward	Texas A&M	
Whitney Knight	Guard	FGCU	
Jessica Kuster	Forward	Rice	
Akela Maize	Center	North Carolina State	
Danielle M. McCray	Forward	Mississippi	
Suriya McGuire	Guard	Miami	
Kelsey Mitchell	Guard	Ohio State	Indiana Fever
Karisma Penn	Forward	Illinois	
Theresa Plaisance	Forward	LSU	Seattle Storm
Lydia Rivers	Forward	Virginia	
Caliya Robinson	Forward	Georgia	
Odyssey Sims	Guard	Baylor	Connecticut Sun
NaLyssa Smith	Forward	Baylor	Indiana Fever
Jenna Staiti	Center	Georgia	
Destinee Walker	Guard	North Carolina/Notre Dame	Niki Lefkadas (Greece)
Jasmine Walker	Forward	Alabama	Seattle Storm
Evina Westbrook	Guard	UConn	Washington Mystics
Courtney Williams	Guard	South Florida	Chicago Sky
Tamera Young	Guard/Forward	James Madison	

== Scoring system ==
There are multiple ways for players to accumulate points during games to make their way into 1 of the 4 captain spots.

=== Win Points ===
Win points are all about the team performance. They accumulate during both individual quarters and overall game wins. Each quarter is worth +50 points and overall games are worth +150 points. If a quarter is tied, the points roll over to the subsequent quarter.

=== Game MVPs ===
After each game, the players and members of The Unlimited Club will vote for players who they feel had standout performances. These points will be added to the player's individual total. Points will be awarded as follows:

- MVP 1: +90 points
- MVP 2: +60 points
- MVP 3: +30 points

=== Individual Stats ===
The final component of points is individual stats. Players will earn points based on their performance:

- Assist: +10
- Steal: +10
- Block: +10
- Shooting Foul Drawn: +4
- Personal Foul Drawn: +4
- Offensive Foul Drawn: +8
- Defensive Rebound: +5
- Offensive Rebound: +10
- Made FT: +10
- Made 2: +20
- Made 3: +30

Players can also lose points for certain actions, such as committing fouls, turning over the ball or missing a shot:

- Shooting Foul Committed: -8
- Personal Foul Committed: -8
- Offensive Foul Committed: -16
- Other Foul Committed: -8
- Turnover: -10
- Missed FT: -10
- Missed 2: -10
- Missed 3: -10

== Captains ==
Each week, based on the point system, the top 4 players will draft their teams. They will draft in a snake style system. Week 1 Captains were chosen based on the final leaderboard standings from the first season. Lexie Brown and Isabelle Harrison would have been captains, but they were replaced by Sims and Williams due to pre-approved absences.

- Week 1 Captains: Taj Cole, Odyssey Sims, Natasha Cloud, and Courtney Williams
- Week 2 Captains: Odyssey Sims, Isabelle Harrison, NaLyssa Smith, and Naz Hillmon
- Week 3 Captains: Odyssey Sims, NaLyssa Smith, Naz Hillmon, and Kelsey Mitchell
- Week 4 Captains: Odyssey Sims, NaLyssa Smith, Kierstan Bell, and Naz Hillmon
- Week 5 Captains: Odyssey Sims, NaLyssa Smith, Naz Hillmon, and Isabelle Harrison

== Games ==
=== Week 1 ===
2023 Athletes Unlimited Season
Week 1

Date	Time (ET)	Matchup			TV	Result	High points	High rebounds	High assists	High blocks
Thursday, February 23	6:00 p.m.	Team Williams	vs	Team Sims	WNBA League Pass; Women's Sport Network	96-93 OT	Odyssey Sims (30)	NaLyssa Smith (10)	Odyssey Sims (12)	Lexie Hull (2)
Thursday, February 23	8:30 p.m.	Team Cloud	vs	Team Cole	WNBA League Pass; Women's Sport Network	78-72	Canada; Gray; Bradford (21)	Crystal Bradford (14)	Natasha Cloud (5)	Bradford; Stati; Carson; Walker (1)
Friday, February 24	6:00 p.m.	Team Cole	vs	Team Sims	WNBA League Pass; Bally Sports Network	95-120	Kelsey Mitchell (28)	NaLyssa Smith (16)	Odyssey Sims (14)	Lexie Hull (3)
Friday, February 24	8:30 p.m.	Team Williams	vs	Team Cloud	WNBA League Pass; Bally Sports Network	75-67	Natasha Cloud (18)	Naz Hillmon (12)	Courtney Williams (8)	Westbrook; Carson (2)
Sunday, February 26	2:30 p.m.	Team Cole	vs	Team Williams	CBS Sports Network	75-89	Isabelle Harrison (27)	Crystal Bradford (13)	Courtney Williams (8)	Allisha Gray (3)
Sunday, February 26	4:30 p.m.	Team Sims	vs	Team Cloud	CBS Sports Network	91-66	NaLyssa Smith (24)	NaLyssa Smith (12)	Odyssey Sims (12)	G'mrice Davis (2)

=== Week 2 ===
2023 Athletes Unlimited Season
Week 2

Date	Time (ET)	Matchup			TV	Result	High points	High rebounds	High assists	High blocks
Wednesday, March 1	6:00 p.m.	Team Smith	vs	Team Harrison	WNBA League Pass; Women's Sports Network					
Wednesday, March 1	8:30 p.m.	Team Sims	vs	Team Hillmon	WNBA League Pass; Women's Sports Network					
Friday, March 3	6:00 p.m.	Team Hillmon	vs	Team Harrison	WNBA League Pass					
Friday, March 3	8:30 p.m.	Team Smith	vs	Team Sims	WNBA League Pass; Women's Sports Network					
Saturday, March 4	6:00 p.m.	Team Hillmon	vs	Team Smith	WNBA League Pass; Bally Sports					
Saturday, March 4	8:30 p.m.	Team Harrison	vs	Team Sims	WNBA League Pass; Bally Sports					

== Leaderboard ==
Below is the leaderboard which tallies the total points earned via the scoring system that each player has accumulated during the games that are played each week. The points are on a running-tally from week to week. The list reflects the final standings - culminating after Week 5.

Rank	Player	Points	Notes
1	NaLyssa Smith	6,811	
2	Naz Hillmon	6,660	
3	Odyssey Sims	6,383	
4	Allisha Gray	5,748	
5	Jordin Canada	5,705	
6	Isabelle Harrison	5,687	
7	Crystal Bradford	5,419	
8	Lexie Hull	5,411	
9	Kelsey Mitchell	5,386	
10	Kierstan Bell	4,950	
11	Layshia Clarendon	4,816	
12	Theresa Plaisance	4,777	
13	Natasha Cloud	4,723	
14	Air Hearn	4,479	
15	Jasmine Walker	4,234	
16	Courtney Williams	4,168	
17	Evina Westbrook	4,143	
18	Lexie Brown	3,939	
19	Danni McCray	3,586	
20	Veronica Burton	3,546	
21	G'mrice Davis	3,538	
22	Lydia Rivers	3,470	
23	Tamera Young	3,360	
24	CC Andrews	3,290	
25	Caliya Robinson	3,270	
26	N'dea Jones	3,132	
27	Akela Maize	3,126	
28	Sydney Colson	3,014	
29	Kirby Burkholder	2,986	
30	Antoinette Bannister	2,930	
31	MeMe Jackson	2,896	
32	Kristi Bellock	2,859	
33	Jenna Staiti	2,743	
34	Taj Cole	2,733	
35	Essence Carson	2,684	
36	Jessica Kuster	2,643	
37	Karisma Penn	2,425	
38	Destinee Walker	2,422	
39	Hope Elam	2,418	
40	Rebecca Harris	2,414	
41	Whitney Knight	2,386	
42	Mya Hollingshed	1,985	
43	Suriya McGuire	1,869	
44	DiJonai Carrington	1,300	Missed Entire AU Season - Injury

== Team Captain Records ==
Team Captains Records
Team	Record	Number of Weeks as Captain
Team Williams	3–0	1
Team Cole	0–3	1
Team Sims	8–7	5
Team Cloud	1–2	1
Team Smith	7–5	4
Team Harrison	2–4	2
Team Hillmon	8–4	4
Team Mitchell	0–3	1
Team Bell	1–2	1
