= 2022 Athletes Unlimited Basketball season =

2022 AU Basketball Season
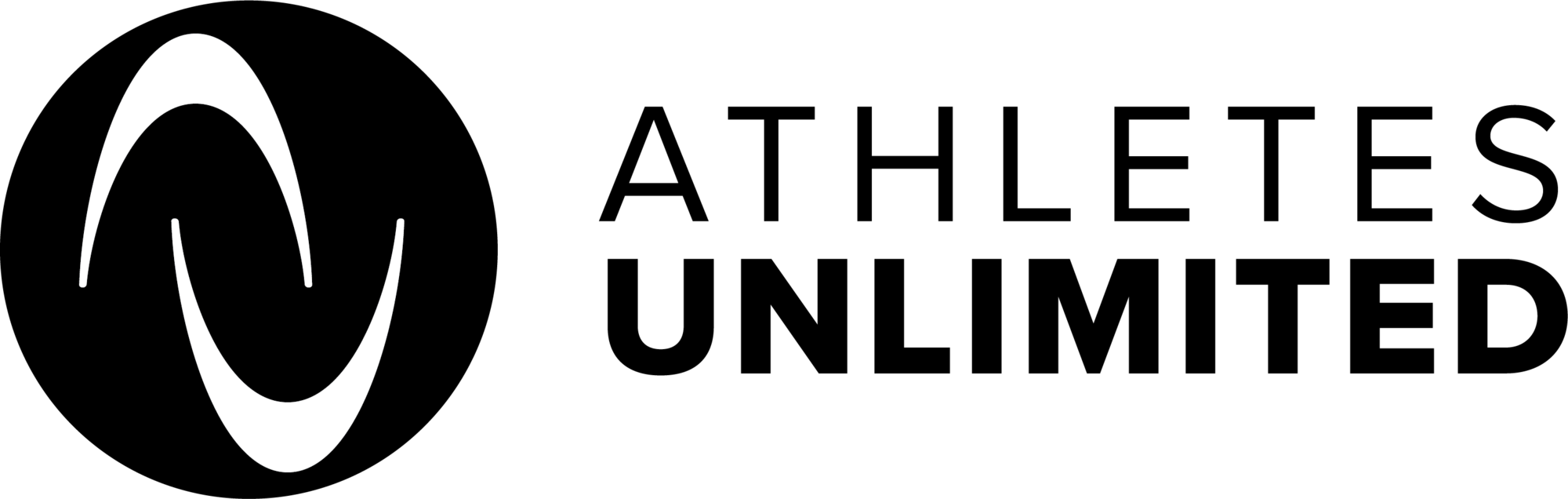
- League: Athletes Unlimited Basketball
- Sport: Basketball
- Duration: January 26 - February 26
- TV partner(s): CBS Sports Network, YouTube, FS2
- Season champions: Tianna Hawkins

Seasons
- 2023 →

The 2022 Season was the Athletes Unlimited Basketball's first in existence. The season was played in Las Vegas and ran from January 26 to February 26. The format in which teams are redrafted each week allows athletes to accumulate points for both individual and team performances, culminating with one individual winner.

Tianna Hawkins became the inaugural Overall Season Winner - finishing with 6,836 points. She also led in many statistical categories. She led the league in rebounds (166) and ranked second in points (357), and owns single-game records for points (43), leaderboard points (790) and field goals (19).

== Players ==
Name	Position	College	Current Team
CC Andrews	Guard	Saint Joseph's	
Antoinette Bannister	Guard/Forward	East Carolina	
Kalani Brown	Center	Baylor	Hatayspor
Lexie Brown	Guard	Duke	Chicago Sky
Kirby Burkholder	Guard	James Madison	Santurce
Marjorie Butler	Guard	Georgia	
DiJonai Carrington	Guard/Forward	Stanford/Baylor	Connecticut Sun
Essence Carson	Guard	Rutgers	
Brittany Carter	Guard	Ball State	Keltern (Germany)
Natasha Cloud	Guard	Saint Joseph's	Washington Mystics
Taj Cole	Guard	Georgia	Baloncesto Málaga
Sydney Colson	Guard	Texas A&M	Las Vegas Aces
Drew Edelman	Forward	USC	Hollywood Wonder (WUBA)
Nikki Greene	Center	Penn State	Union Féminine Angers Basket 49
Mikiah Herbert Harrigan	Forward	South Carolina	Seattle Storm
Rebecca Harris	Forward	Illinois	WBC Dynamo Kyiv
Isabelle Harrison	Forward	Tennessee	Dallas Wings
Tianna Hawkins	Forward	Maryland	Atlanta Dream
Ariel Hearn	Guard	Memphis	Sherbrooke Suns
Grace Hunter	Guard	North Carolina State	
Briahanna Jackson	Guard	Louisville	Club Aztks
Meme Jackson	Guard/Forward	Tennessee	Santurce
Tyce Knox	Guard	Texas A&M	
Jessica Kuster	Forward	Rice	
Takoia Larry	Forward	Texas Wesleyan	
Jantel Lavender	Forward	Ohio State	Indiana Fever
Akela Maize	Center	North Carolina State	La Glacerie
Lauren Manis	Forward	Holy Cross	Cegledi
Shannon McCallum	Guard	Charlotte	
Danielle L. McCray	Guard/Forward	Kansas	Poznań
Danielle M. McCray	Forward	Mississippi	Hannover
Imani McGee-Stafford	Center	Texas	
Laurin Mincy	Guard	Maryland	
Kelsey Mitchell	Guard	Ohio State	Indiana Fever
Chelsea Phillips	Forward	Park University	FSV Rijeka
Toccara Ross	Forward	Iowa State	Pioneras de Delicias
Tina Roy	Guard	South Carolina	
Mercedes Russell	Center	Tennessee	Seattle Storm
Odyssey Sims	Guard	Baylor	Atlanta Dream
Antoinette Thompson	Guard	TCU	Saarlouis
Destinee Walker	Guard	North Carolina/Notre Dame	Niki Lefkadas
Becca Wann-Taylor	Guard/Forward	Richmond	
Courtney Williams	Guard	South Florida	Atlanta Dream
Dominique Wilson	Guard	North Carolina State	Śląsk Wrocław
Tamera Young	Guard/Forward	James Madison	

== Scoring system ==
There are multiple ways for players to accumulate points during games to make their way into 1 of the 4 captain spots.

=== Win Points ===
Win points are all about the team performance. They accumulate during both individual quarters and overall game wins. Each quarter is worth +50 points and overall games are worth +100 points. If a quarter is tied, the points roll over to the subsequent quarter.

=== Game MVPs ===
After each game, the players and members of The Unlimited Club will vote for players who they feel had standout performances. These points will be added to the player's individual total. Points will be awarded as follows:

- MVP 1: +90 points
- MVP 2: +60 points
- MVP 3: +30 points

=== Individual Stats ===
The final component of points is individual stats. Players will earn points based on their performance:

- Assist: +10
- Steal: +10
- Block: +10
- Shooting Foul Drawn: +4
- Personal Foul Drawn: +4
- Offensive Foul Drawn: +8
- Defensive Rebound: +5
- Offensive Rebound: +10
- Made FT: +10
- Made 2: +20
- Made 3: +30

Players can also lose points for certain actions, such as committing fouls, turning over the ball or missing a shot:

- Shooting Foul Committed: -8
- Personal Foul Committed: -8
- Offensive Foul Committed: -16
- Other Foul Committed: -8
- Turnover: -10
- Missed FT: -10
- Missed 2: -10
- Missed 3: -10

== Captains ==
Each week, based on the point system, the top 4 players will draft their teams. They will draft in a snake style system.

- Week 1 Captains: Kelsey Mitchell, Mercedes Russell, Odyssey Sims, and DiJonai Carrington
- Week 2 Captains: Natasha Cloud, Lexie Brown, Isabelle Harrison, and Mercedes Russell
- Week 3 Captains: Tianna Hawkins, Lexie Brown, Natasha Cloud, and Isabelle Harrison
- Week 4 Captains: Tianna Hawkins, Natasha Cloud, Isabelle Harrison, and Odyssey Sims
- Week 5 Captains: Tianna Hawkins, Natasha Cloud, Isabelle Harrison, and Lexie Brown

== Games ==
=== Week 1 ===
2022 Athletes Unlimited Season
Week 1

Date	Time (ET)	Matchup			TV	Result	High points	High rebounds	High assists	High blocks
Wednesday, January 26	9:00 p.m.	Team Sims	vs	Team Russell	YouTube	71–80	Taj Cole (21)	Danni M. McCray (12)	Sims; Cole (4)	Mikiah Herbert Harrigan (2)
Wednesday, January 26	11:00 p.m.	Team Mitchell	vs	Team Carrington	CBS Sports Network	85–92	Isabelle Harrison (21)	McGee-Stafford; Carrington (11)	Natasha Cloud (13)	Harrison; Kuster (2)
Friday, January 28	7:00 p.m.	Team Carrington	vs	Team Russell	FS2	110-104 (2OT)	DiJonai Carrington (30)	Russell; Lavender; Harrison (10)	Natasha Cloud (15)	Manis; Cole; Carter (1)
Friday, January 28	9:30 p.m.	Team Sims	vs	Team Mitchell	FS2	103–108	Kalani Brown (32)	Essence Carson (11)	Odyssey Sims (12)	Kalani Brown (2)
Saturday, January 29	7:00 p.m.	Team Carrington	vs	Team Sims	FS2	84-78	Odyssey Sims (24)	Mikiah Herbert Harrigan (9)	Odyssey Sims (8)	Mikiah Herbert Harrigan (2)
Saturday, January 29	9:30 p.m.	Team Russell	vs	Team Mitchell	YouTube	79-71	Mercedes Russell (20)	Tianna Hawkins (11)	Cole; Brown (5)	Danni M McCray (4)

=== Week 2 ===
2022 Athletes Unlimited Season
Week 2

Date	Time (ET)	Matchup			TV	Result	High points	High rebounds	High assists	High blocks
Wednesday, February 2	6:30 p.m.	Team Harrison	vs	Team Brown	YouTube	76-83	Isabelle Harrison (29)	Isabelle Harrison (12)	Lexie Brown (5)	Imani McGee-Stafford (4)
Wednesday, February 2	9:00 p.m.	Team Cloud	vs	Team Russell	Bally Sports	105-94	Natasha Cloud (30)	Russell; Greene (11)	Natasha Cloud (8)	Nikki Greene (3)
Friday, February 4	7:00 p.m.	Team Russell	vs	Team Brown	FS2	98-85	Tianna Hawkins (38)	Lexie Brown (10)	Lexie Brown (8)	Greene; Carson (1)
Friday, February 4	9:30 p.m.	Team Harrison	vs	Team Cloud	FS2	95-89	Courtney Williams (30)	Kalani Brown (11)	Natasha Cloud (7)	Sims; Williams; Brown; Harrison (1)
Saturday, February 5	7:00 p.m.	Team Russell	vs	Team Harrison	FS2	74-100	Mercedes Russell (20)	Russell; Lavender (8)	Courtney Williams (10)	Greene; Jackson (1)
Saturday, February 5	10:00 p.m.	Team Brown	vs	Team Cloud	Bally Sports	97-84	Tianna Hawkins (46)	Cloud; Hawkins (10)	Taj Cole (12)	Tianna Hawkins (3)

=== Week 3 ===
2022 Athletes Unlimited Season
Week 3

Date	Time (ET)	Matchup			TV	Result	High points	High rebounds	High assists	High blocks
Wednesday, February 9	6:30 p.m.	Team Cloud	vs	Team Brown	YouTube	85-80	DiJonai Carrington (25)	Kalani Brown (12)	Natasha Cloud (6)	Herbert Harrigan; Manis; Carson; Jantel Lavender; Cloud (1)
Wednesday, February 9	9:00 p.m.	Team Hawkins	vs	Team Harrison	Bally Sports	54-79	Tianna Hawkins (20)	Nikki Greene (10)	Courtney Williams (8)	Greene; Russell; Harrison; Hawkins (1)
Friday, February 11	7:00 p.m.	Team Harrison	vs	Team Brown	FS2	86-81	Isabelle Harrison (25)	Odyssey Sims (12)	Courtney Williams (10)	McGee-Stafford; Cole (2)
Friday, February 11	9:30 p.m.	Team Cloud	vs	Team Hawkins	FS2	70-90	Tianna Hawkins (28)	Drew Edelman (14)	Sydney Colson (9)	Edelman; Hawkins (2)
Saturday, February 12	7:30 p.m.	Team Harrison	vs	Team Cloud	FS2	85-79	Odyssey Sims (32)	Courtney Williams (12)	Natasha Cloud (10)	Courtney Williams (2)
Saturday, February 12	10:30 p.m.	Team Brown	vs	Team Hawkins	Bally Sports	90-104	Tianna Hawkins (32)	Tianna Hawkins (14)	Sydney Colson (9)	Hawkins; Lavender; McGee-Stafford; Jackson (1)

=== Week 4 ===
2022 Athletes Unlimited Season
Week 4

Date	Time (ET)	Matchup			TV	Result	High points	High rebounds	High assists	High blocks
Wednesday, February 16	6:30 p.m.	Team Cloud	vs	Team Harrison	YouTube	87-85	Natasha Cloud (27)	DiJonai Carrington (11)	Isabelle Harrison (8)	McGee-Stafford; Lavender (2)
Wednesday, February 16	9:00 p.m.	Team Hawkins	vs	Team Sims	Bally Sports Network	86-76	Kelsey Mitchell (32)	Hawkins; Walker (11)	Colson; Sims (8)	Nikki Greene (2)
Friday, February 18	7:00 p.m.	Team Sims	vs	Team Harrison	Bally Sports Network	87-71	Taj Cole (26)	Kuster; Harrison (11)	Cole; Williams (5)	Herbert Harrigan; Harrison (3)
Friday, February 18	11:30 p.m.	Team Cloud	vs	Team Hawkins	CBS Sports Network	110-113	DiJonai Carrington (41)	Carrington; Hawkins (14)	Natasha Cloud (8)	Kalani Brown (4)
Saturday, February 19	7:00 p.m.	Team Sims	vs	Team Cloud	FS2	81-91	Sims; Carrington (28)	Manis; Carrington (11)	Courtney Williams (10)	Laurin Mincy (4)
Saturday, February 19	9:30 p.m.	Team Harrison	vs	Team Hawkins	FS2	100-93	Tianna Hawkins (29)	Tianna Hawkins (12)	Sydney Colson (13)	Hawkins; Jantel Lavender (1)

=== Week 5 ===
2022 Athletes Unlimited Season
Week 5

Date	Time (ET)	Matchup			TV	Result	High points	High rebounds	High assists	High blocks
Wednesday, February 23	9:00 p.m.	Team Harrison	vs	Team Cloud	Bally Sports Network	78-88	Sims; DiJonai Carrington (22)	Imani McGee-Stafford (15)	Natasha Cloud (9)	McGee-Stafford; Herbert Harrigan (1)
Wednesday, February 23	11:30 p.m.	Team Hawkins	vs	Team Brown	CBS Sports Network	80-70	Kalani Brown (22)	Tianna Hawkins (14)	Taj Cole (8)	Kalani Brown (3)
Friday, February 25	7:00 p.m.	Team Brown	vs	Team Cloud	FS2	97-88	Natasha Cloud (31)	Kalani Brown (16)	Taj Cole (8)	Kalani Brown (4)
Friday, February 25	9:30 p.m.	Team Harrison	vs	Team Hawkins	FS2	74-85	Isabelle Harrison (28)	Tianna Hawkins (13)	Sydney Colson (10)	Nikki Greene (3)
Saturday, February 26	7:00 p.m.	Team Brown	vs	Team Harrison	FS2	103-90	Odyssey Sims (30)	Kalani Brown (10)	Cole; Williams (9)	Herbert Harrigan; Greene; Kuster; Brown (10
Saturday, February 26	10:00 p.m.	Team Cloud	vs	Team Hawkins	Bally Sports Network	111-116 (3OT)	Tianna Hawkins (35)	Tianna Hawkins (18)	Natasha Cloud (19)	Manis; Carrington (1)

== Leaderboard ==
Below is the leaderboard which tallies the total points earned via the scoring system that each player has accumulated during the games that are played each week. The points are on a running-tally from week to week. The list reflects the final standings - culminating after Week 5.

Rank	Player	Points	Notes
1	Tianna Hawkins	6,836	
2	Natasha Cloud	5,919	
3	Isabelle Harrison	5,373	
4	Lexie Brown	5,317	
5	Kalani Brown	5,192	
6	Odyssey Sims	5,043	
7	DiJonai Carrington	4,953	
8	Jantel Lavender	4,473	
9	Courtney Williams	4,461	Missed Week 1 due to COVID Protocols
10	Taj Cole	4,415	
11	Kelsey Mitchell	4,295	Missed the Game on February 5
12	Sydney Colson	4,162	
13	Destinee Walker	4,032	
14	Jessica Kuster	4,017	
15	Air Hearn	3,861	
16	Nikki Greene	3,813	
17	Lauren Manis	3,426	
18	Essence Carson	3,350	Inactive for Week 4
19	Tamera Young	3,320	
20	Danni McCray	3,284	
21	Imani McGee-Stafford	3,251	Entered COVID Protocol after 1 game in Week 1
22	Mercedes Russell	3,235	Inactive for the game on February 12, as well, as the entirety of Week 4
23	Rebecca Harris	3,152	
24	Dominique Wilson	3,138	
25	Drew Edelman	3,044	
26	Laurin Mincy	3,019	
27	MeMe Jackson	2,829	
28	Kirby Burkholder	2,767	
29	Toccara Ross	2,729	
30	Marjorie Butler	2,676	
31	Mikiah Herbert Harrigan	2,627	
32	Briahanna Jackson	2,548	
33	Akela Maize	2,541	Missed Week 1 due to COVID Protocols
34	Shannon McCallum	2,281	Only played in Game 3 during Week 1
35	Brittany Carter	2,249	
36	Danielle McCray	2,247	Inactive for Week 3-5
37	Chelsea Phillips	2,242	
38	Grace Hunter	2,190	
39	Becca Wann-Taylor	2,134	
40	Antoinette Bannister	2,125	
41	Takoia Larry	2,119	
42	CC Andrews	2,055	
43	Tina Roy	2,027	
44	Antoinette Thompson	1,901	Missed the Game on February 4
45	Tyce Knox	1,300	

== Team Captain Records ==
Team Captains Records
Team	Record	Number of Weeks as Captain
Team Carrington	3–0	1
Team Hawkins	6–2	3
Team Harrison	6–5	4
Team Brown	4–4	3
Team Cloud	5–6	4
Team Russell	2–4	2
Team Mitchell	1–2	1
Team Sims	1–5	2
