= Dawn Staley Community Leadership Award =

Community Leadership Award: WNBA, USA

The Dawn Staley Community Leadership Award is an annual Women's National Basketball Association (WNBA) award given since the league's 2008 season, that recognizes a player who is an inspiration in her community and reflects Dawn Staley’s leadership, spirit, charitable efforts and love for the game. This is the same criterion used by the analogous NBA Community Assist Award, given by the NBA since its 2001-02 season. However, this award is distinct from the WNBA Community Assist Award, first presented on a monthly basis in 2009 with a season-long award added in 2019.

Every year, each of the WNBA teams nominates one of its players to compete for this award. From these nominees, a designated committee vote for the winner and the WNBA donates $10,000 to a charity that the player chooses on their behalf.

Tamika Catchings, Tina Charles, Elena Delle Donne have won the award the most times, with 2 selections each.

== Winners ==
	Denotes player who is still active in the WNBA
	Inducted into the Women's Basketball Hall of Fame
	Inducted into the Naismith Memorial Basketball Hall of Fame
	Denotes player whose team won championship that year
Player (X)	Denotes the number of times the player has won
Team (X)	Denotes the number of times a player from this team has won

Season	Player	Position	Nationality	Team
2008	Tamika Catchings	Forward	United States	Indiana Fever
2009	Tamika Raymond	Forward	United States	Connecticut Sun
2010	Chamique Holdsclaw	Forward	United States	San Antonio Silver Stars
2011	Charde Houston	Forward	United States	Minnesota Lynx
2012	Tina Charles	Center	United States	Connecticut Sun (2)
2013	Kara Lawson	Guard	United States	Connecticut Sun (3)
2014	Elena Delle Donne	Guard / Forward	United States	Chicago Sky
2015	Elena Delle Donne (2)	Guard / Forward	United States	Chicago Sky (2)
2016	Tamika Catchings (2)	Forward	United States	Indiana Fever (2)
2017	Ivory Latta	Guard	United States	Washington Mystics
2018	Skylar Diggins	Guard	United States	Dallas Wings
2019	Natasha Cloud	Guard	United States	Washington Mystics (2)
2020	Natalie Achonwa	Center	Canada	Indiana Fever (3)
2021	Not awarded			
2022	Betnijah Laney	Guard / Forward	United States	New York Liberty
2023	Kelsey Mitchell	Guard	United States	Indiana Fever (4)
2024	A'ja Wilson	Forward	United States	Las Vegas Aces (2)
2025	Tina Charles (2)	Center	United States	Connecticut Sun (4)
2026	Paige Bueckers	Guard	United States	Dallas Wings

== Multi-time winners ==
Awards	Player	Team(s)	Years
2	Elena Delle Donne	Chicago Sky	2014, 2015
2	Tamika Catchings	Indiana Fever	2008, 2016
2	Tina Charles	Connecticut Sun	2012, 2025

== See also ==
- List of sports awards honoring women
