= NaLyssa Smith =

American basketball player (born 2000)

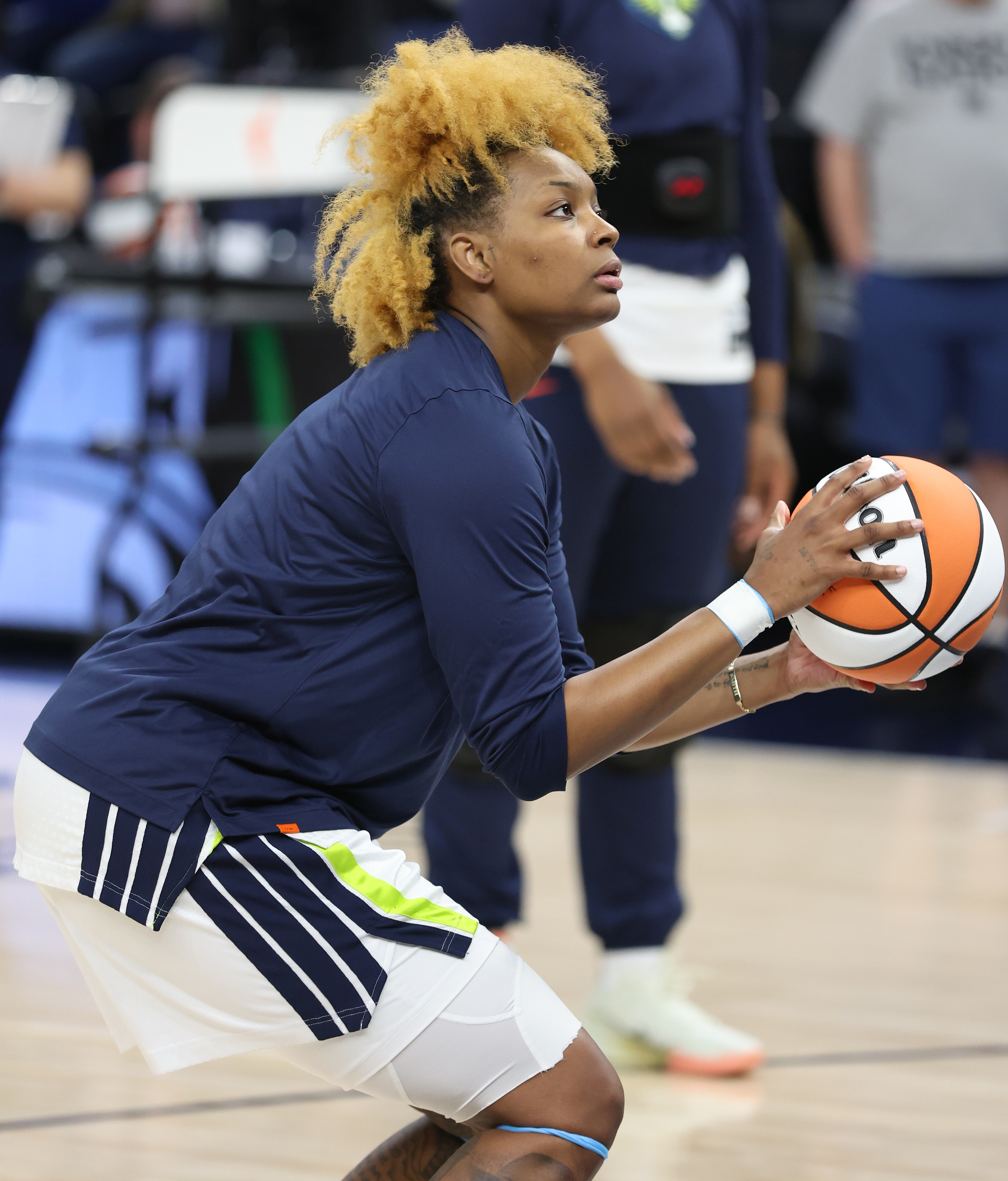
- Smith with the Dallas Wings in 2025

No. 3 – Las Vegas Aces
- Position: Power forward
- League: WNBA

Personal information
- Born: August 8, 2000 (age 26) San Antonio, Texas, U.S.
- Listed height: 6 ft 4 in (1.93 m)
- Listed weight: 185 lb (84 kg)

Career information
- High school: East Central (San Antonio, Texas)
- College: Baylor (2018–2022)
- WNBA draft: 2022: 1st round, 2nd overall pick
- Drafted by: Indiana Fever

Career history
- 2022–2024: Indiana Fever
- 2023: Athletes Unlimited League
- 2023–2024: Galatasaray
- 2024: Zhejiang Golden Bulls
- 2025: Mist BC
- 2025: Dallas Wings
- 2025–present: Las Vegas Aces

Career highlights
- WNBA champion (2025); WNBA All-Rookie Team (2022); Athletes Unlimited League champion (2023); NCAA champion (2019); Wade Trophy (2021); Honda Sports Award (2021); Katrina McClain Award (2021); 2× WBCA Coaches' All-American (2021, 2022); 2× First-team All-American – AP (2021, 2022); First-team All-American – USBWA (2022); Second-team All-American – USBWA (2021); 2× Big 12 Player of the Year (2021, 2022); Big 12 Tournament Most Outstanding Player (2021); Big 12 All-Defensive Team (2022); 3× First-team All-Big 12 (2020–2022); McDonald's All-American (2018)
- Stats at WNBA.com
- Stats at Basketball Reference
Medals
Women's basketball
Representing United States
FIBA Americas U18 Championship
Gold medal – first place	2018 Mexico City	Team
Women's 3x3 basketball
Representing the United States
FIBA 3x3 AmeriCup
Bronze medal – third place	2022 Miami	Team

NaLyssa Smith (born August 8, 2000) is an American professional basketball player for the Las Vegas Aces of the Women's National Basketball Association (WNBA) and Athletes Unlimited Pro Basketball. She played college basketball for Baylor, winning the NCAA Division I Championship in 2019 and the Wade Trophy in 2021. She was drafted second overall by the Indiana Fever in the 2022 WNBA draft.

== Early life ==
Smith grew up in San Antonio and played at East Central High School, averaging 23.4 points, 13.7 rebounds, and 3.4 blocks per game as a senior. A five-star recruit and the no. 3 recruit by ESPN, Smith committed to playing college basketball at Baylor over schools such as South Carolina, Ohio State, and Louisville.

== College career ==
=== Freshman year ===
As a freshman, Smith came off the bench for the Lady Bears and provided steady minutes. Baylor coach, Kim Mulkey, praised Smith and said that she won many games for the Bears during their national championship season because opposing teams were too focused on the team's star players, Lauren Cox and Kalani Brown. In the national championship game, she came off the bench to replace an injured Cox and put up eight points and four rebounds to help Baylor win the title over Notre Dame.

=== Sophomore year ===
Smith was promoted into the starting lineup in her sophomore year and improved on her production, averaging 14.3 points and 8 rebounds en route to earning first-team All-Big 12 honors. She also led the Lady Bears in double-doubles with a total of 11.

=== Junior year ===
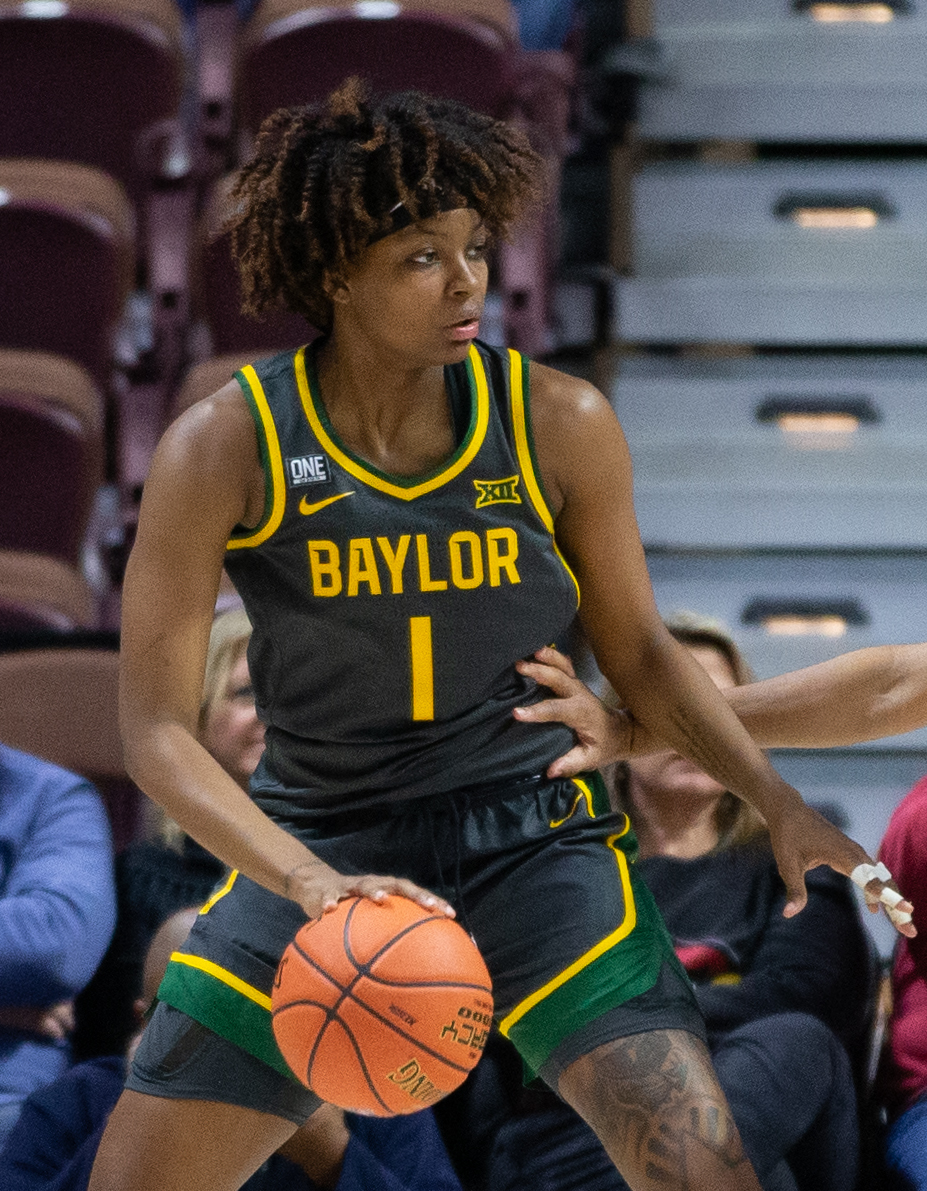
Smith with Baylor in 2021

Smith continued to improve, averaging a near double-double and winning Big 12 Player of the Year.

In the NCAA tournament, Smith scored 24 points in the Lady Bears' Sweet Sixteen match against Michigan and tied a tournament record for most field goals made without a miss with 11.

Smith's stellar season garnered her a number of awards, such as the Wade Trophy, the Katrina McClain Award, and All-American honors from the Associated Press, Women's Basketball Coaches Association, and the United States Basketball Writers Association.

== Professional career ==
=== WNBA ===
==== Indiana Fever (2022–2024) ====
On April 11, 2022, Smith was drafted second overall by the Indiana Fever in the 2022 WNBA draft, and would go on to be selected to the WNBA All-Rookie Team alongside then teammate, Queen Egbo.

==== Dallas Wings (2025) ====
On January 31, 2025, sports journalist Kendra Andrews reported that Smith and the 8th pick in the 2025 WNBA draft would be traded to the Dallas Wings in a three-way team deal that would send Sophie Cunningham and the 2025 19th overall pick from the Phoenix Mercury to the Fever. The deal was finalized on February 2, 2025 and was officially part of a larger four-team trade.

==== Las Vegas Aces (2025-present) ====
On June 30, 2025, Smith was traded to the Las Vegas Aces in exchange for the Aces' first round draft pick in 2027.

=== Overseas ===
==== Galatasaray ====
On August 30, 2023, she signed with Galatasaray of the Turkish Women's Basketball Super League (TKBL).

==== Zhejiang ====
Smith signed with the Zhejiang Golden Bulls of the Women's Chinese Basketball Association for the 2024–2025 season. She was released by the team after suffering an ankle injury.

=== Unrivaled ===
==== Mist BC (2025–present) ====
In January, Mist BC signed Smith to a relief player contract due to DiJonai Carrington and Jewell Loyd being unavailable for their January 24 game versus Phantom BC.

=== Athletes Unlimited ===
Smith competed in Athletes Unlimited Pro Basketball during the 2023 season, where she won the individual championship after averaging 24.2 points and 12.3 rebounds per game. She set a league record by scoring 50 points in the final game of the season and recorded 12 double-doubles across 15 games, scoring at least 20 points in 12 contests. In 2026, Smith returned to Athletes Unlimited Pro Basketball and her participation marked the return of a former Athletes Unlimited title winner to the league's player pool in Nashville.

== National team career ==
Smith was a member of the United States women's national under-18 basketball team at the 2018 FIBA Americas U18 Championship, helping them win the gold medal in Mexico City.

She was selected to represent the United States women's national under-19 basketball team at the 2019 FIBA Under-19 Women's Basketball World Cup, but withdrew due to injury concerns.

== Career statistics ==
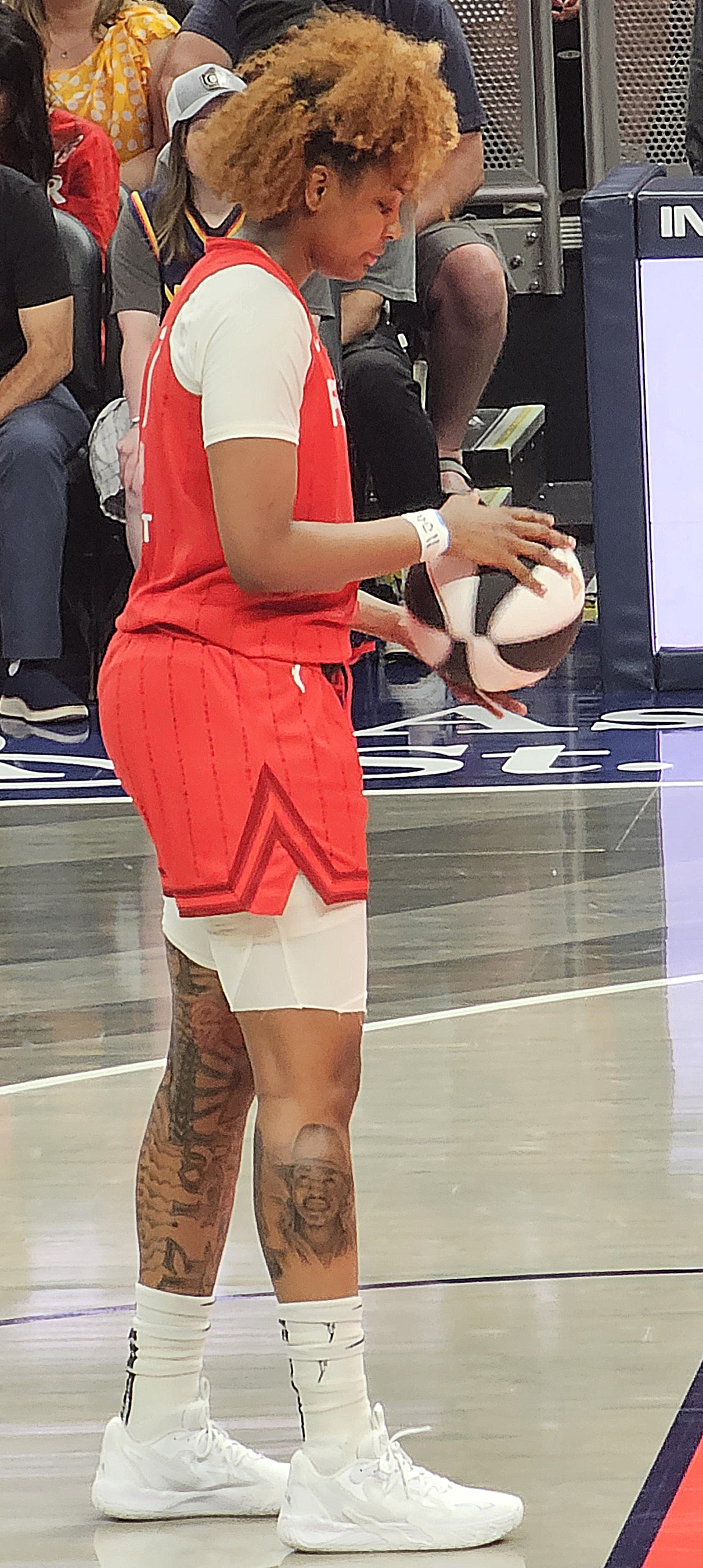
Smith with the Indiana Fever in 2024

Legend
GP	Games played	GS	Games started	MPG	Minutes per game	RPG	Rebounds per game
APG	Assists per game	SPG	Steals per game	BPG	Blocks per game	PPG	Points per game
TO	Turnovers per game	FG%	Field-goal percentage	3P%	3-point field-goal percentage	FT%	Free-throw percentage
**Bold**	Career best	°	League leader

†	Denotes season(s) in which Smith won a WNBA championship
*	Denotes season(s) in which Smith won an NCAA Championship

=== WNBA ===
==== Regular season ====
WNBA regular season statistics
Year	Team	GP	GS	MPG	FG%	3P%	FT%	RPG	APG	SPG	BPG	TO	PPG
2022	Indiana	32	32	**30.7**	.419	**.381**	.618	7.9	**1.4**	.5	.3	2.4	13.5
2023	Indiana	31	28	28.5	.477	.284	**.677**	**9.2**	**1.4**	.3	.3	2.7	**15.5**
2024	Indiana	**40**°	37	24.8	.480	.292	.567	7.1	1.0	**.8**	**1.0**	1.3	10.6
2025^{†}	Dallas	18	15	19.1	.425	.182	.617	4.9	.8	.4	.9	**.9**	6.7
2025^{†}	Las Vegas	27	26	22.7	.556	.375	.607	5.3	.7	.7	.5	1.3	8.2
2026	Las Vegas	38	**38**	24.3	**.638**°	.125	.575	6.4	.9	.6	.7	**.9**	11.7
**Career**	5 years, 3 teams	186	176	25.5	.496	.320	.609	7.0	1.1	.6	.6	1.6	11.4

==== Playoffs ====
WNBA playoff statistics
Year	Team	GP	GS	MPG	FG%	3P%	FT%	RPG	APG	SPG	BPG	TO	PPG
2024	Indiana	2	1	6.5	.000	—	—	2.0	.0	.5	.5	**1.0**	.0
2025^{†}	Las Vegas	**12**	**12**	**23.1**	**.578**	.0	**.407**	**5.0**	**.5**	**.8**	**1.0**	**1.0**	**7.1**
2026	Las Vegas	Did not play (injury)											
**Career**	2 year, 2 teams	14	13	20.7	.569	.0	.407	4.6	.4	.7	.9	1.0	6.1

=== College ===
NCAA statistics
Year	Team	GP	GS	MPG	FG%	3P%	FT%	RPG	APG	SPG	BPG	TO	PPG
2018–19*	Baylor	**38**	1	15.3	.543	.111	.681	5.1	.4	.4	.4	**.9**	8.4
2019–20	Baylor	28	27	24.1	**.586**	.000	.746	8.0	.6	.9	.6	1.7	14.3
2020–21	Baylor	31	31	30.5	.561	.214	.792	8.9	**1.2**	**1.2**	.8	2.8	18.0
2021–22	Baylor	35	**35**	**32.9**	.550	**.237**	**.795**	**11.5**	1.1	.7	**1.1**	2.5	**22.1**
**Career**		132	94	25.4	.558	.200	.768	8.3	.8	.8	.7	1.9	15.5

== Personal life ==
Smith is the daughter of Rodney and Nikki Smith. Her father played basketball at UTSA, and her brother, Rodney Jr., played soccer at the University of Saint Mary.
