= Tianna Hawkins =

American basketball player (born 1991)

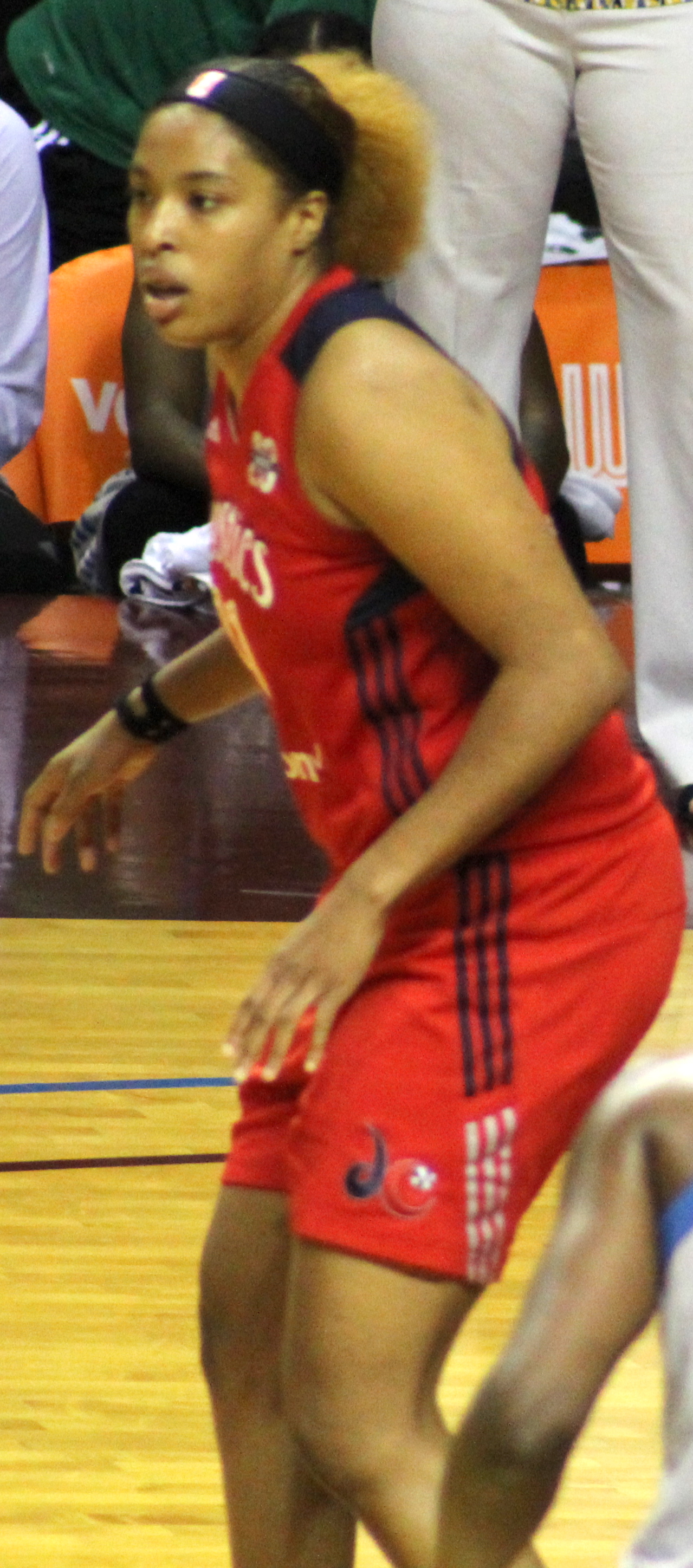
- Hawkins during the 2017 WNBA Semifinals

No. 21 – Townsville Fire
- Position: Power forward
- League: WNBL

Personal information
- Born: March 2, 1991 (age 35) Washington D.C., U.S.
- Listed height: 6 ft 3 in (1.91 m)
- Listed weight: 186 lb (84 kg)

Career information
- High school: Riverdale (Upper Marlboro, Maryland)
- College: Maryland (2009–2013)
- WNBA draft: 2013: 1st round, 6th overall pick
- Drafted by: Seattle Storm
- Playing career: 2013–present

Career history
- 2013: Seattle Storm
- 2013–2014: UNIQA Euroleasing Sopron
- 2014–2020: Washington Mystics
- 2014–2016: Henan Yichuan
- 2016–2017: Guri KDB Life Winnus
- 2017–2018: Asan Woori Bank Wibee
- 2021: Atlanta Dream
- 2022–2023: Washington Mystics
- 2023–present: Townsville Fire

Career highlights
- WNBL champion (2023); WNBL Grand Final MVP (2023); Athletes Unlimited Champion (2022); WNBA champion (2019); First-team All-ACC (2013)
- Stats at WNBA.com
- Stats at Basketball Reference

Tianna Marie Hawkins (born March 2, 1991) is an American professional basketball player for the Townsville Fire of the Women's National Basketball League (WNBL). She played college basketball at the University of Maryland and attended Riverdale Baptist School in Upper Marlboro, Maryland.

== College statistics ==
Legend
GP	Games played	GS	Games started	MPG	Minutes per game	FG%	Field goal percentage
3P%	3-point field goal percentage	FT%	Free throw percentage	RPG	Rebounds per game	APG	Assists per game
SPG	Steals per game	BPG	Blocks per game	TO	Turnovers per game	PPG	Points per game
**Bold**	Career high	*	Led Division I

Year	Team	GP	GS	MPG	FG%	3P%	FT%	RPG	APG	SPG	BPG	TO	PPG
2009–10	Maryland	34	9	22.9	56.8	0.0	62.3	7.5	0.3	0.6	1.0	1.8	9.2
2010–11	Maryland	32	18	16.8	58.1	0.0	75.8	5.4	0.3	0.4	0.6	**0.9**	7.4
2011–12	Maryland	**36**	**36**	25.9	**62.3***	0.0	68.2	9.1	0.9	**0.9**	**1.1**	1.8	12.0
2012–13	Maryland	34	34	**28.7**	54.3	**27.6**	**79.1**	**9.7**	**1.1**	0.7	0.7	2.6	**18.0**
**Career**		136	97	23.7	57.4	25.0	72.0	8.0	0.7	0.7	0.9	1.8	11.7

== Professional career ==
Hawkins was drafted by the Seattle Storm with the 6th overall pick in the 2013 WNBA draft. She played with UNIQA Euroleasing Sopron during the 2013-2014 EuroLeague Women season. Hawkins and Bria Hartley were traded to the Washington Mystics in exchange for Crystal Langhorne on April 14, 2014.

In the WNBA, her career field goal percentage was 49.8%, Rebounds 2.4 a game, and PPG were 4.0.

In the 2022–23 WNBL season, Hawkins helped the Townsville Fire win the WNBL championship while earning grand final MVP honors.

== WNBA statistics ==
=== Regular season ===
Year	Team	GP	GS	MPG	FG%	3P%	FT%	RPG	APG	SPG	BPG	TO	PPG
2013	Seattle	33	0	9.7	**.527**	.238	.846	1.6	0.2	0.3	0.1	**0.7**	3.4
2014	Washington	34	0	10.6	.479	.294	.719	3.0	0.5	0.4	0.2	1.0	4.2
2016	Washington	24	0	10.5	.494	**.500**	.857	2.5	0.4	0.2	0.2	1.0	4.7
2017	Washington	33	1	16.6	.471	.261	**.953**	4.2	0.3	0.5	0.2	0.8	6.9
2018	Washington	32	4	16.6	.443	.357	.824	3.5	0.8	0.5	0.4	1.1	6.3
2019^{†}	Washington	31	1	15.4	.514	.363	.925	4.2	0.7	0.5	0.1	1.1	**9.5**
2020	Washington	17	5	19.4	.408	.298	.846	3.5	1.0	**0.8**	0.4	1.2	8.5
2021	Atlanta	28	8	15.5	.397	.242	.913	3.1	0.6	0.4	**0.5**	1.1	4.9
2022	Washington	25	0	12.8	.386	.264	.952	2.4	0.8	0.4	0.1	1.2	4.9
2023	Washington	**40**	**21**	**23.1**	.491	.333	.750	**5.0**	**1.4**	**0.8**	0.4	1.2	8.2
Career	10 years, 3 teams	297	40	15.1	.464	.315	.854	3.4	0.7	0.5	0.3	1.0	6.1

=== Playoffs ===
Year	Team	GP	GS	MPG	FG%	3P%	FT%	RPG	APG	SPG	BPG	TO	PPG
2013	Seattle	1	0	6.0	.000	—	—	2.0	0.0	0.0	0.0	1.0	0.0
2014	Washington	2	0	13.0	**.700**	**1.000**	**1.000**	3.0	0.5	0.0	0.0	**0.0**	**8.0**
2017	Washington	5	0	13.8	.478	.286	**1.000**	2.0	0.4	0.0	**0.2**	0.2	5.2
2018	Washington	**9**	**1**	12.7	.444	.333	.867	2.9	0.6	**0.2**	0.2	0.6	5.8
2019^{†}	Washington	**9**	0	9.6	.682	.600	.667	2.3	0.6	0.2	0.0	0.9	4.2
2020	Washington	1	0	**15.0**	.143	.000	.750	**5.0**	0.0	0.0	0.0	2.0	5.0
2023	Washington	2	0	14.5	.400	.500	—	4.5	**1.0**	0.0	0.0	1.0	2.5
Career	6 years, 2 teams	29	1	11.9	.495	.405	.840	2.7	0.5	0.1	0.1	0.7	4.9
