= Jantel Lavender =

American basketball player (born 1988)

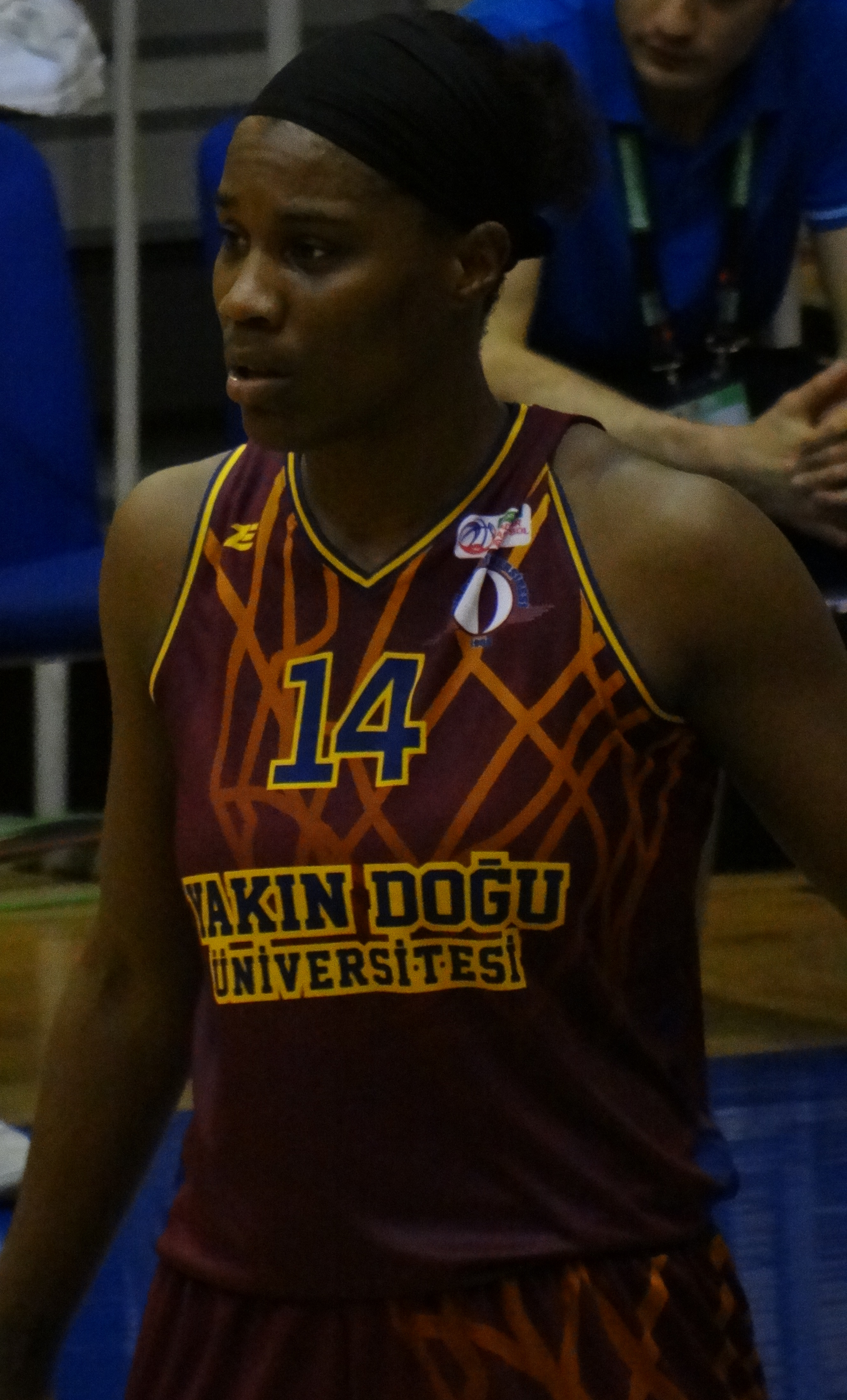

Personal information
- Born: November 12, 1988 (age 38) Cleveland, Ohio, U.S.
- Listed height: 6 ft 4 in (1.93 m)
- Listed weight: 185 lb (84 kg)

Career information
- High school: Cleveland Central Catholic (Cleveland, Ohio)
- College: Ohio State (2007–2011)
- WNBA draft: 2011: 1st round, 5th overall pick
- Drafted by: Los Angeles Sparks
- Playing career: 2011–2022
- Position: Power forward

Career history
- 2011–2018: Los Angeles Sparks
- 2011: Beşiktaş
- 2012: CCC Polkowice
- 2012–2013: Beretta Famila Schio
- 2013–2015: Wisła Kraków
- 2015–2017: Fenerbahçe Istanbul
- 2017–2018: Yakin Dogu
- 2018–2019: Famila Schio
- 2019–2020: Chicago Sky
- 2020: Çukurova Basketbol
- 2020–2021: Indiana Fever
- 2022: Athletes Unlimited League
- 2022: Seattle Storm

Career highlights
- WNBA champion (2016); WNBA Sixth Woman of the Year (2016); WNBA All-Star (2015); 2× Polish National League champion (2014, 2015); Polish National League MVP (2015); 2× Polish Cup winner (2014, 2015); 2× Polish Cup MVP (2014, 2015); Italian National League champion (2013); Turkish National League champion (2016); 2× Turkish Cup winner (2016, 2018); 3× All-American – State Farm Coaches', USBWA (2009–2011); 2× First-team All-American – AP (2010, 2011); Second-team All-American – AP (2009); 2× Big Ten Player of the Year (2009, 2010); 2× Big Ten co-Player of the Year (2008, 2011); 3× Big Ten Tournament MOP (2009–2011); 4× First-team All-Big Ten (2008–2011); Big Ten Freshman of the Year (2008); Big Ten All-Freshman Team (2008); McDonald's All-American (2007)
- Stats at WNBA.com
- Stats at Basketball Reference
Medals
Women's basketball
Representing the United States
World University Games
Gold medal – first place	2009 Belgrade	Team
FIBA Under-19 World Cup
Gold medal – first place	2007 Slovakia	Team
FIBA Under-18 Americas Championship
Gold medal – first place	2006 United States	Team

Jantel Lavender (born November 12, 1988) is an American former professional basketball player who most recently played for the Seattle Storm of the Women's National Basketball Association (WNBA). She was drafted with the fifth overall pick in the 2011 WNBA draft by the Los Angeles Sparks.

== College ==
At Ohio State University, Lavender was named Big Ten Conference Women's Basketball Player of the Year in each of her four seasons (2008–2011). The Big Ten presents two separate POY awards, one voted on by league coaches and the other by media members. Lavender received the coaches' version in 2008, the media version in 2011, and both awards in 2009 and 2010. At the time, this made her only the third NCAA Division I women's player to be a four-time conference player of the year. (Note: Lavender has since been joined by Macee Williams of IUPUI in the Horizon League (2019–2022).)

== USA Basketball ==
Lavender was a member of the USA Women's U18 team which won the gold medal at the FIBA Americas Championship in Colorado Springs, Colorado. The event was held in July 2006, when the USA team defeated Canada to win the championship. Lavender averaged 4.8 points per game. Lavender was a member of the USA Women's U19 team which won the gold medal at the FIBA U19 World Championship in Bratislava, Slovakia. The event was held in July and August 2007, when the USA team defeated Sweden to win the championship. Lavender scored 16 points in the preliminary round game against Lithuania, then scored 28 points in a win over Spain. She scored 25 points in the win over the Czech Republic. Over the course of the tournament, she averaged 16.0 points per game, second only to Maya Moore with 16.3 per game. Lavender led the team in rebounding, averaging 8.1 per game. Lavender was named a member of the team representing the US at the 2009 World University Games held in Belgrade, Serbia. The team won all seven games to earn the gold medal. She recorded a double-double, with 16 points and 12 rebounds against France. In the gold medal game against previously undefeated Russia, Lavender had 14 points.

== WNBA career ==
Lavender was selected in the first round of the 2011 WNBA draft (5th overall) by the Los Angeles Sparks. Throughout her first four seasons, she was a reserve on the Sparks' roster and had been a key contributor off the bench with her scoring and rebounding.

In 2015, Lavender re-signed with the Sparks once her rookie contract expired. Lavender had a breakout season in 2015. With Candace Parker sitting out the first half of the season to rest, Lavender became the Sparks' starting center. She would start in all 34 games and average a career-high 14.5 points per game along with 8.3 rebounds per game. That same year she was voted as a WNBA all-star for the first time in her career.

In the 2016 season, Lavender returned to the back-up center role on the team's roster, with Parker returning to the starting center position. Off the bench, Lavender was still effective for the Sparks, she had averaged 9.6 points per game and scored a career-high 25 points in an overtime regular season win against the Connecticut Sun. Her season performance would earn her the WNBA Sixth Woman of the Year Award. The Sparks finished 26–8, advancing all the way to the WNBA Finals and defeated the Minnesota Lynx 3 games to 2, as they won their first championship since 2002 as well as Lavender winning her first championship.

In 2017, Lavender signed a contract extension with the Sparks. During the 2017 season, Lavender averaged 7.3 ppg off the bench. The Sparks would once again finished as the number 2 seed in the league with the same record they posted last season, receiving a double-bye to the semi-finals. The Sparks would eliminate the Phoenix Mercury in a 3-game sweep, advancing to the Finals for the second season in a row, setting up a rematch with the Lynx. However, the Sparks would lose in five games, failing to win back-to-back championships.

In the 2018 season, Lavender played 30 games with 7 starts to help fill in the starting power forward role during Nneka Ogwumike's absence. The Sparks finished with a 19–15 record, clinching the number 6 seed. In the first round elimination game, the Sparks defeated the Minnesota Lynx 75–68, ending their streak of three consecutive Finals appearances. However, the Sparks would lose to the Washington Mystics in the second round elimination game, 96–64.

A few days before the 2019 season, Lavender was traded to the Chicago Sky in exchange for a 2020 second round draft pick. Lavender immediately became a starter for the Sky. On August, 14, 2019, Lavender underwent foot surgery to repair a fracture in her left foot, causing her to miss the rest of the season with a recovery period of 8–9 weeks. Without Lavender, the Sky finished the season 20–14 as the number 5 seed, they would make it as far as the second round where they lost 93–92 to the Las Vegas Aces in the elimination game.

On June 30, 2020, it was announced that Lavender would miss the whole 2020 season after once again having to undergo surgery on her left foot. On August 28, 2020, Lavender was traded to the Indiana Fever along with a second and third-round draft pick in exchange for Stephanie Mavunga.

In February 2021, Lavender re-signed with the Indiana Fever to a multi-year deal.

== Overseas career ==
In the 2010-11 off-season, Lavender played in Turkey for Beşiktaş JK. In the 2011-12 off-season, Lavender played in Poland for CCC Polkowice. In the 2012-13 off-season, Lavender played in Italy for PF Schio winning an Italian championship. From 2013 to 2015, Lavender played two off-seasons in Poland once again for WBC Wisła Kraków, winning a couple Polish Cups and National championships as well as MVP honors for both the seasons and the Cup series in both those years. In the 2015-16 off-season, Lavender played for Fenerbahçe Istanbul in Turkey and won both the Turkish Cup and Turkish National championship. As of August 2016, Lavender had re-signed with Fenerbahçe Istanbul for the 2016-17 off-season. In September 2017, Lavender signed with Yakin Dogu for the 2017-18 off-season and won another Turkish Cup. In the 2018-19 off-season, Lavender signed with Famila Schio of the Italian league. In January 2020, Lavender signed with Çukurova Basketbol of the Turkish league for the 2019-20 off-season, the Turkish/Euroleague season eventually got cancelled due to the COVID-19 pandemic.

== Career statistics ==
Legend
GP	Games played	GS	Games started	MPG	Minutes per game	RPG	Rebounds per game
APG	Assists per game	SPG	Steals per game	BPG	Blocks per game	PPG	Points per game
TO	Turnovers per game	FG%	Field-goal percentage	3P%	3-point field-goal percentage	FT%	Free-throw percentage
**Bold**	Career best	°	League leader

†	Denotes seasons in which Lavender won a WNBA championship

=== WNBA ===
==== Regular season ====
Year	Team	GP	GS	MPG	FG%	3P%	FT%	RPG	APG	SPG	BPG	TO	PPG
2011	Los Angeles	33	3	14.8	.500	.000	.733	3.1	0.5	0.1	0.3	**0.8**	6.6
2012	Los Angeles	**34**	1	14.4	.506	.000	.844	3.9	0.5	0.2	0.5	1.1	5.6
2013	Los Angeles	**34**	3	16.8	.507	.000	.865	4.5	0.5	**0.5**	0.6	1.0	7.2
2014	Los Angeles	**34**	27	28.3	.527	.200	.794	6.3	1.5	**0.5**	0.7	1.9	11.9
2015	Los Angeles	**34**	**34**	**33.8**	.525	**.333**	.882	**8.3**	**1.8**	0.4	**1.2**	2.1	**14.5**
2016^{†}	Los Angeles	**34**	0	19.4	**.538**	.000	.683	3.6	1.3	0.2	0.5	1.1	9.6
2017	Los Angeles	32	0	17.3	.488	.313	.846	3.0	0.9	0.2	0.1	1.2	7.3
2018	Los Angeles	30	7	17.0	.428	.188	.900	3.7	0.7	0.4	0.2	1.0	5.2
2019	Chicago	23	22	26.9	.490	.222	**.905**	6.9	1.1	0.3	0.5	1.3	10.0
2021	Indiana	27	14	20.0	.404	.200	.900	3.9	1.5	0.0	0.1	1.4	6.4
2022	Seattle	27	4	12.2	.409	.208	.667	3.3	0.9	0.1	0.1	0.9	3.8
Career	11 years, 4 teams	342	115	20.1	.495	.229	.819	4.6	1.0	0.3	0.5	1.3	8.1

==== Playoffs ====
Year	Team	GP	GS	MPG	FG%	3P%	FT%	RPG	APG	SPG	BPG	TO	PPG
2012	Los Angeles	4	0	10.0	**.750**	.000	.500	2.3	0.5	0.0	0.0	0.7	1.8
2013	Los Angeles	3	0	11.6	.714	.000	.500	2.3	0.0	0.0	0.0	**0.0**	3.7
2014	Los Angeles	2	2	20.4	.429	.000	.000	4.5	**1.5**	0.5	0.0	0.5	6.0
2015	Los Angeles	3	**3**	**34.5**	.577	**1.000**	.600	**6.7**	1.0	**0.6**	0.3	1.6	**11.3**
2016^{†}	Los Angeles	**9**	0	15.6	.607	.000	.000	2.3	1.0	0.0	0.1	0.2	7.6
2017	Los Angeles	8	0	14.1	.436	.125	**1.000**	2.9	0.5	0.3	0.0	0.5	4.8
2018	Los Angeles	2	0	16.0	.500	.500	.000	3.0	0.5	0.0	**1.0**	1.0	5.5
Career	7 years, 1 team	29	5	16.3	.548	.182	.667	3.1	0.7	0.2	0.1	0.5	5.9

== Ohio State statistics ==
Legend
GP	Games played	GS	Games started	MPG	Minutes per game
FG%	Field goal percentage	3P%	3-point field goal percentage	FT%	Free throw percentage
RPG	Rebounds per game	APG	Assists per game	SPG	Steals per game
BPG	Blocks per game	PPG	Points per game	**Bold**	Career high

Year	Team	GP	Points	FG%	3P%	FT%	RPG	APG	SPG	BPG	PPG
2007–08	Ohio State	31	547	51.3	20.0	66.1	9.9	1.2	0.4	1.0	17.6
2008–09	Ohio State	35	728	54.1	-	75.5	10.7	1.8	0.4	1.2	20.8
2009–10	Ohio State	**36**	769	51.4	**40.0**	77.6	10.3	1.6	**0.5**	1.5	21.4
2010–11	Ohio State	34	**774**	**54.8**	-	**80.2**	**10.9**	**2.4**	0.4	**1.8**	**22.8**
Career	Ohio State	136	2818	53.0	23.1	75.6	10.5	1.8	0.4	1.4	20.7
