= Nikki Greene =

American basketball player (born 1990)

No. 54 – Whai
- Position: Power forward / center
- League: Tauihi Basketball Aotearoa

Personal information
- Born: September 6, 1990 (age 36) North Charleston, South Carolina
- Listed height: 6 ft 4 in (1.93 m)
- Listed weight: 192 lb (87 kg)

Career information
- High school: Diboll (Diboll, Texas)
- College: Penn State (2009–2013)
- WNBA draft: 2013: 3rd round, 26th overall pick
- Drafted by: Phoenix Mercury
- Playing career: 2013–present

Career history
- 2013–2014: Samsung Life Blueminx
- 2014: Los Angeles Sparks
- 2014–2015: A.S. Ramat Hasharon Electra
- 2015–2016: CCC Polkowice
- 2015: Connecticut Sun
- 2016–2017: Sleza Wroclaw
- 2017–2019: Bnei Herzliya Basket
- 2019: Pszczolka AZS-UMCS Lublin
- 2019: Hobart Huskies
- 2019–2021: Union Féminine Angers Basket 49
- 2022–present: Tauranga Whai

Career highlights
- French LF2 champion (2021); PLK champion (2017); TBA Defensive Player of the Year (2022); Big Ten All-Defensive Team (2011)
- Stats at Basketball Reference

Sheniqua S. "Nikki" Greene (born September 6, 1990) is an American professional basketball player.

== College career ==
Greene played college basketball for the Penn State Lady Lions between 2009 and 2013.

== Career statistics ==
Legend
GP	Games played	GS	Games started	MPG	Minutes per game	RPG	Rebounds per game
APG	Assists per game	SPG	Steals per game	BPG	Blocks per game	PPG	Points per game
TO	Turnovers per game	FG%	Field-goal percentage	3P%	3-point field-goal percentage	FT%	Free-throw percentage
**Bold**	Career best	°	League leader

=== WNBA ===
==== Regular season ====
Year	Team	GP	GS	MPG	FG%	3P%	FT%	RPG	APG	SPG	BPG	TO	PPG
2014	Los Angeles	11	0	3.5	20.0	0.0	**100.0**	1.0	0.0	0.1	0.1	0.5	0.5
2015	Connecticut	**12**	0	**8.4**	**40.0**	0.0	85.7	**2.0**	**0.2**	**0.3**	**0.4**	0.5	**1.2**
Career	2 years, 2 teams	23	0	6.0	30.0	0.0	87.5	1.5	0.1	0.2	0.3	0.5	0.8

==== Playoffs ====
Year	Team	GP	GS	MPG	FG%	3P%	FT%	RPG	APG	SPG	BPG	TO	PPG
2014	Los Angeles	1	0	3.0	0.0	0.0	0.0	1.0	0.0	0.0	0.0	0.0	0.0
Career	1 year, 1 team	1	0	3.0	0.0	0.0	0.0	1.0	0.0	0.0	0.0	0.0	0.0

=== College ===
Legend
GP	Games played	GS	Games started	MPG	Minutes per game
FG%	Field goal percentage	3P%	3-point field goal percentage	FT%	Free throw percentage
RPG	Rebounds per game	APG	Assists per game	SPG	Steals per game
BPG	Blocks per game	PPG	Points per game	**Bold**	Career high

Year	Team	GP	Points	FG%	3P%	FT%	RPG	APG	SPG	BPG	PPG
2009–10	Penn State	31	218	43.9	–	53.5	6.2	0.4	0.6	1.8	7.0
2010–11	Penn State	**35**	298	43.2	–	48.5	7.8	0.2	**1.1**	**2.1**	8.5
2011–12	Penn State	33	**323**	47.2	–	64.3	7.8	**0.4**	1.1	1.4	**9.8**
2012–13	Penn State	32	293	**48.5**	–	**65.1**	**8.5**	0.3	0.8	1.2	9.2
Career	Penn State	131	1132	45.7	–	58.5	7.6	0.3	0.9	1.6	8.6

== Professional career ==
Greene was selected 26th overall in the 2013 WNBA draft by the Phoenix Mercury.

For the 2013–14 season, Greene played in South Korea for Samsung Life Blueminx. She returned to the U.S. in 2014 and made her WNBA debut for the Los Angeles Sparks.

Greene split the 2014–15 season in Israel for A.S. Ramat Hasharon Electra and in Poland for CCC Polkowice. In 2015, she played her second season in the WNBA for the Connecticut Sun.

Greene returned to Polkowice for the 2015–16 season and played in Poland again in 2016–17 for Sleza Wroclaw. For the 2017–18 season, she played for Bnot Hertzeliya in Israel. She returned to Hertzeliya for the 2018–19 season, but left in January 2019 to play out the season in Poland with Pszczolka AZS-UMCS Lublin.

In 2019, Greene played in Australia for the Hobart Huskies of the NBL1.

For the 2019–20 and 2020–21 seasons, Greene played in France for Angers - Union Feminine Basket 49.

In 2022, Greene moved to New Zealand to play in the Tauihi Basketball Aotearoa for Whai, where she won the league's Defensive Player of the Year.
