= Kelsey Mitchell (basketball) =

American basketball player (born 1995)

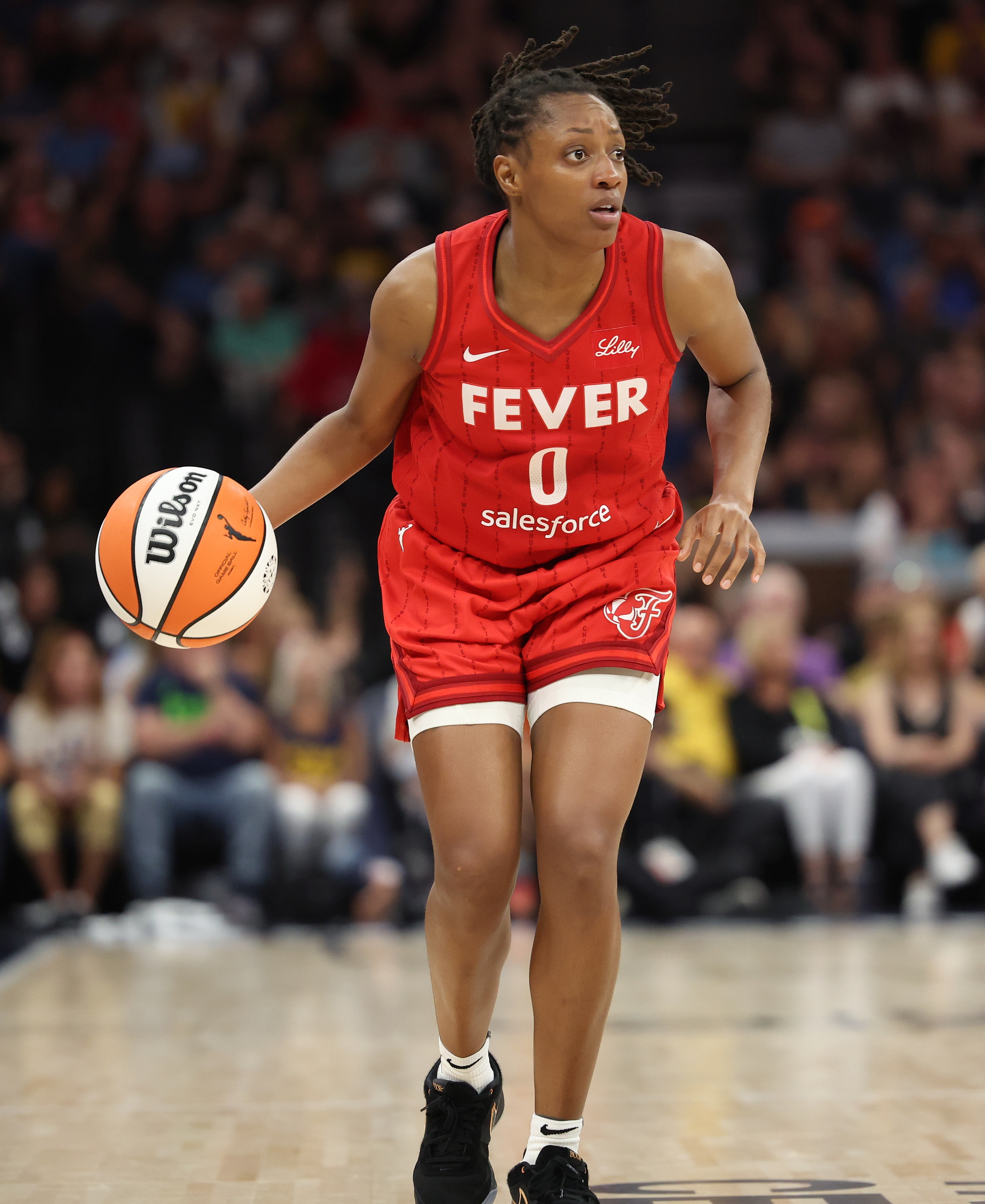
- Mitchell with the Indiana Fever in 2024

No. 0 – Indiana Fever
- Position: Point guard / shooting guard
- League: WNBA

Personal information
- Born: November 12, 1995 (age 31) Cincinnati, Ohio, U.S.
- Listed height: 5 ft 8 in (1.73 m)
- Listed weight: 153 lb (69 kg)

Career information
- High school: Princeton (Sharonville, Ohio)
- College: Ohio State (2014–2018)
- WNBA draft: 2018: 1st round, 2nd overall pick
- Drafted by: Indiana Fever
- Playing career: 2018–present

Career history
- 2018–present: Indiana Fever
- 2019: Al Ahly
- 2021–2022: Elitzur Ramla
- 2023: Spar Citylift Girona
- 2022–2024: Athletes Unlimited League
- 2024–2025: Shanxi Flame
- 2026: Hive BC

Career highlights
- 4× WNBA All-Star (2023–2026); 2× All-WNBA First Team (2025, 2026); WNBA All-Rookie Team (2018); WNBA Commissioner's Cup champion (2025); Dawn Staley Leadership Award (2023); Dawn Staley Award (2018); First-team All-American – AP (2016); 3× Second-team All-American – AP (2015, 2017, 2018); 3× WBCA Coaches' All-American (2016–2018); 4× All-American – USBWA (2015–2018); 2× Big Ten co-Player of the Year (2015, 2018); Big Ten Player of the Year (2017); Big Ten Tournament MOP (2018); 4× First-team All-Big Ten (2015–2018); USBWA National Freshman of the Year (2015); Big Ten Freshman of the Year (2015); Big Ten All-Freshman team (2015); McDonald's All American (2014)
- Stats at Basketball Reference
Medals
Women's 3x3 basketball
Representing the United States
FIBA 3x3 AmeriCup
Gold medal – first place	2023 San Juan	Team

Kelsey Michelle Mitchell (born November 12, 1995) is an American professional basketball player for the Indiana Fever of the Women's National Basketball Association (WNBA) and for the Hive of Unrivaled.

Mitchell played college basketball for the Ohio State University Buckeyes. As a college freshman in 2014-15, Mitchell finished the season with 873 total points, the second highest by a freshman in NCAA Division I history. Mitchell finished the regular season of her final season, in 2018, with the third-most points in NCAA Division I history, and, after the post season, finished her college career with the second-most points, trailing only Kelsey Plum of Washington. In February 2018, Mitchell was named the Big Ten women's basketball player of the year. She was a second-team All-American in 2015, 2017, and 2018, while notching first-team All-American honors in 2016. In 2018, following her senior year, Mitchell won the Dawn Staley Award for best guard in Division I college basketball. Mitchell remains Ohio State's all-time leading scorer.

Mitchell was the second overall pick in the 2018 WNBA draft by the Indiana Fever, and was selected to the 2018 WNBA All-Rookie Team. Mitchell participated in the WNBA Three-Point Contest in 2018 and 2023. For her leadership on and off the court, Mitchell was awarded the 2023 Dawn Staley Community Leadership Award. Mitchell became a three-time WNBA All-Star with appearances in 2023, 2024 and 2025.

In 2019, Mitchell played for Egyptian club Al Ahly in the 2019 FIBA Africa Women's Clubs Champions Cup. Mitchell signed with the Shanxi Flame of the Women's Chinese Basketball Association for the 2024-2025 season.

== College career ==
Mitchell completed her college career with the Ohio State Buckeyes in 2018. In February 2018, she was named the Big Ten women's basketball player of the year by the conference's coaches. She was a second-team All-American in 2015, 2017, and 2018, while notching first-team All-American in 2016.

As a college freshman in 2014–15, Mitchell finished the season with 873 total points, which were the second-most by a freshman in NCAA Division I history, behind Tina Hutchinson's 898 with San Diego State in 1983–84. During her senior season, Mitchell averaged 24.4 points per game on 46.1 percent shooting and 40.3 percent shooting from three. She also managed 4.1 assists per game and 3.2 rebounds per game. She finished the regular season of her final season with the third-most points in NCAA Division I history, and ultimately finished her career with 3,402 points, trailing only Kelsey Plum of Washington. In 2018, after her senior year, she won the Dawn Staley Award.

== Professional career ==
=== WNBA ===
==== Indiana Fever (2018–present) ====
Mitchell was the second overall pick in the 2018 WNBA draft by the Indiana Fever, and was selected to the 2018 WNBA All-Rookie Team alongside A'ja Wilson, Ariel Atkins, and Diamond DeShields. Mitchell participated in the WNBA Three-Point Contest in 2018 and 2023. For her leadership on and off the court, Mitchell was awarded the 2023 Dawn Staley Community Leadership Award, becoming the 4th Fever player to win the recognition after Tamika Catchings (2008 & 2016) and Natalie Achonwa (2020). Mitchell participated in the 2024 Skills Challenge at 2024 WNBA All-Star Weekend after Fever teammate, Erica Wheeler, was unable to attend due to the global computer outages delaying her travel. She became a three-time WNBA All-Star with appearances in 2023, 2024 and 2025 alongside Fever teammates Aliyah Boston and Caitlin Clark.

After entering free agency in 2025, the Fever designated Mitchell as a core player, giving the team exclusive rights and guaranteeing her a supermax contract for the 2025 season. Mitchell had been the team's top signing priority according to Fever GM Amber Cox. Mitchell signed a core contract on January 29.

During the 2025 WNBA season, Mitchell experienced a serious medical incident in Game 5 of the semifinals on September 30, 2025. Initially believed to be severe lower-body cramping, it was later identified as rhabdomyolysis—a dangerous condition in which muscle tissue breaks down and releases harmful proteins into the bloodstream. She was transported to a local Las Vegas hospital to receive IV fluids and was released later that night.. Despite Caitlin Clark missing most of the year, the Fever nearly made it to the finals as the 6th seed upsetting the Altanta Dream in Game 3, and then taking the eventual champs the distance losing to the Las Vegas aces in the fifth and final deciding game.. That game went to overtime with Mitchell going down in the 3rd qtr with rhabdo and Boston fouling out at the end of regulation on suspect calls.

Shortly after Indy's deep 2025 playoff run the Fever once again stated signing Kelsey would be their No.1 priority. It was announced on November 24, 2025 Mitchell had signed on to play for Project B, a new league that is scheduled to launch fall of 2026.. Then in March of 2026 just after the historic WNBA Collective Bargaining Agreement ESPN's Chiney Ogwumike reported Kelsey Mitchell signed the first $1.4 million supermax agreement with the Indiana Fever. Kelsey's salary increased nearly five times with average WNBA salaries quadrupling to over $500,000/yr.

=== Overseas ===
In 2019, Mitchell played for Egyptian club Al Ahly in the 2019 FIBA Africa Women's Clubs Champions Cup.

Mitchell played in Israeli League for Elitzur Ramla in the 2021–22 off-season.

In 2023, Mitchel played 8 games with Uni Girona in Girona, Spain in the Spanish First League and 5 games in EuroCup.

Mitchell signed with the Shanxi Flame of the Women's Chinese Basketball Association for the 2024–2025 season.

=== Unrivaled ===
On November 5, 2025, it was announced that Mitchell had been drafted by Hive BC for the 2026 Unrivaled season.

== Personal life ==
Mitchell is from Cincinnati, Ohio, and graduated from Princeton High School in Sharonville, Ohio. She has a twin sister, Chelsea.

She has a Bachelor's Degree from Ohio State, graduating in 2018. On August 7, 2020, she earned her Master's Degree in Sports Administration from the University of Cincinnati.

She is currently studying for her Ph.D. in Educational Leadership at Liberty University, expecting to complete by 2028.

== Career statistics ==
Legend
GP	Games played	GS	Games started	MPG	Minutes per game	FG%	Field goal percentage
3P%	3-point field goal percentage	FT%	Free throw percentage	RPG	Rebounds per game	APG	Assists per game
SPG	Steals per game	BPG	Blocks per game	TO	Turnovers per game	PPG	Points per game
**Bold**	Career high	*	Led Division I	°	Led the league	‡	WNBA record

=== WNBA ===
==== Regular season ====
WNBA regular season statistics
Year	Team	GP	GS	MPG	FG%	3P%	FT%	RPG	APG	SPG	BPG	TO	PPG
2018	Indiana	34	17	24.4	.346	.335	.804	1.8	2.7	.7	.1	1.9	12.7
2019	Indiana	34°	20	25.1	.387	.374	.836	1.6	2.6	.4	.1	1.7	13.6
2020	Indiana	22°	22°	32.1	.448	.389	.849	2.2	2.8	.6	.1	2.5	17.9
2021	Indiana	32°	32°	33.1	.431	.335	**.882**	**2.6**	2.5	**1.1**	**.2**	2.0	17.8
2022	Indiana	31	31	32.6	.438	.409	.861	1.9	**4.2**	.9	**.2**	2.4	18.4
2023	Indiana	40°	40°	**33.7**	.441	.398	.824	1.6	3.1	.9	.1	2.3	18.2
2024	Indiana	40°	38	32.0	.468	.402	.832	2.5	1.8	.7	**.2**	**1.6**	19.2
2025	Indiana	**44**	**44**	31.4	.456	.394	.784	1.8	3.4	.9	**.2**	1.8	20.2
2026	Indiana	**44**°	**44**°	32.5	**.509**	**.450**°	.851	1.7	2.8	1.0	.1	**1.6**	**24.7**
**Career**	9 years, 1 team	321	288	30.8	.444	.391	.832	1.9	2.9	.8	.1	1.9	18.4
**Career**	All-Star	4	2	17.3	.553	.346	1.000	2.3	1.8	2.3	.0	.5	15.8

==== Playoffs ====
WNBA playoff statistics
Year	Team	GP	GS	MPG	FG%	3P%	FT%	RPG	APG	SPG	BPG	TO	PPG
2024	Indiana	2	2	**38.5**	.421	.263	.500	**3.0**	**4.0**	.0	.0	4.5	19.0
2025	Indiana	**8**	**8**	32.6	**.428**	**.429**	**.867**	1.5	3.0	**1.0**	**.3**	2.3	**22.3**
2026	Indiana	3	3	33.7	.327	.333	.818	1.0	1.7	.7	**.3**	**1.7**	20.3
**Career**	3 years, 1 team	13	13	33.8	.403	.371	.841	1.6	2.8	.8	.2	2.5	21.3

=== College ===
NCAA statistics
Year	Team	GP	GS	MPG	FG%	3P%	FT%	RPG	APG	SPG	BPG	TO	PPG
2014–15	Ohio State	**35**	**35**	**37.1**	.415	.378	.835	**4.2**	**4.2**	**1.7**	**.2**	4.1	24.9*
2015–16	Ohio State	34	34	36.6	**.452**	.397	**.852**	3.2	3.4	**1.7**	**.2**	3.1	**26.1**
2016–17	Ohio State	**35**	**35**	34.2	.437	.369	.818	2.8	3.9	1.2	**.2**	2.4	22.6
2017–18	Ohio State	**35**	**35**	35.9	.448	**.402**	.832	3.2	**4.2**	1.5	.1	**2.2**	24.3
**Career**		139	139	35.9	.438	.386	.835	3.3	3.9	1.5	.2	3.0	24.5

== See also ==
- List of NCAA Division I women's basketball career scoring leaders
- List of NCAA Division I women's basketball career 3-point scoring leaders
