= Kirby Burkholder =

American basketball player

Personal information
- Listed height: 6 ft 0 in (1.83 m)

Career information
- College: James Madison (2010–2014)

Career highlights
- CAA Player of the Year (2014); First-team All-CAA(2013, 2014)

Kirby Burkholder is a professional basketball player who plays guard. In college, she played NCAA Division I basketball for James Madison Dukes, winning numerous awards, including Conference Player of the Year. In 2014, she signed contracts with both the Washington Mystics and Azzurra Orvieto of the Italian A1 League.

While playing guard for Orvieto, she led the team in points and rebounds through the first 20 rounds of the 2014–15 season.

== College career ==
During the 2013–14 NCAA Women's Basketball season, Burkholder finished among the top 7 guards in the nation in rebounds per game (303 in her Senior season), and among the top 100 players (including centers and forwards) in the nation with 8.7 rebounds per game. She finished 32nd in free throw percentage in NCAA Women's D1 Basketball. She averaged 19.1 points per game during her 2013–14 senior campaign and led her team in steals.

In the 2014 NCAA women's basketball tournament, Burkholder scored 28 points and secured 18 rebounds against top 35 rebounding team Gonzaga as JMU beat Gonzaga and advanced in the 2014 NCAA women's basketball tournament. Burkholder scored 20 points and got 10 rebounds against Texas A&M.

During the regular season of her senior year in the 2013–14 season, Burkholder scored 24 points and grabbed 18 rebounds versus the Virginia Cavaliers, scored 33 points against a Delaware team which had previously won 44 Coastal Athletic Association (CAA) Conference games in a row, and scored 20 points and got 2 steals against UCLA. While competing against Drexel in the 2014 Conference Tournament, Burkholder earned a Double-double which included 22 rebounds and 3 steals, setting a Conference Tournament record.

In 2014, Burkholder was named the Conference Player of the Year for the CAA and was named the NCAA Women's Basketball Player of the Year for the state of Virginia by the Richmond Times-Dispatch. She was also named the 2014 CAA women's basketball Scholar-Athlete of the Year.

== James Madison statistics ==
Legend
GP	Games played	GS	Games started	MPG	Minutes per game
FG%	Field goal percentage	3P%	3-point field goal percentage	FT%	Free throw percentage
RPG	Rebounds per game	APG	Assists per game	SPG	Steals per game
BPG	Blocks per game	PPG	Points per game	**Bold**	Career high

Year	Team	GP	Points	FG%	3P%	FT%	RPG	APG	SPG	BPG	PPG
2010–11	James Madison	24	31	**52.4**	**50.0**	63.6	1.8	0.3	0.3	0.1	1.3
2011–12	James Madison	**37**	425	36.2	31.7	84.0	6.9	**2.2**	**1.8**	**0.5**	11.5
2012–13	James Madison	36	539	39.2	34.7	88.0	**9.1**	1.7	1.6	0.4	15.0
2013–14	James Madison	35	**652**	38.9	36.1	**89.3**	8.7	1.9	1.6	0.3	**18.6**
Career		132	1647	38.5	34.3	87.0	7.0	1.6	1.4	0.3	12.5

== Professional career ==
Burkholder entered and became a prospect in the 2014 WNBA draft. In April 2014, Burkholder signed a free agent contract with the Washington Mystics. She then signed a professional contract with Azzurra Orvieto to play in the Italian A1 League based in Orvieto, Italy.
