= Lexie Brown =

American basketball player (born 1994)

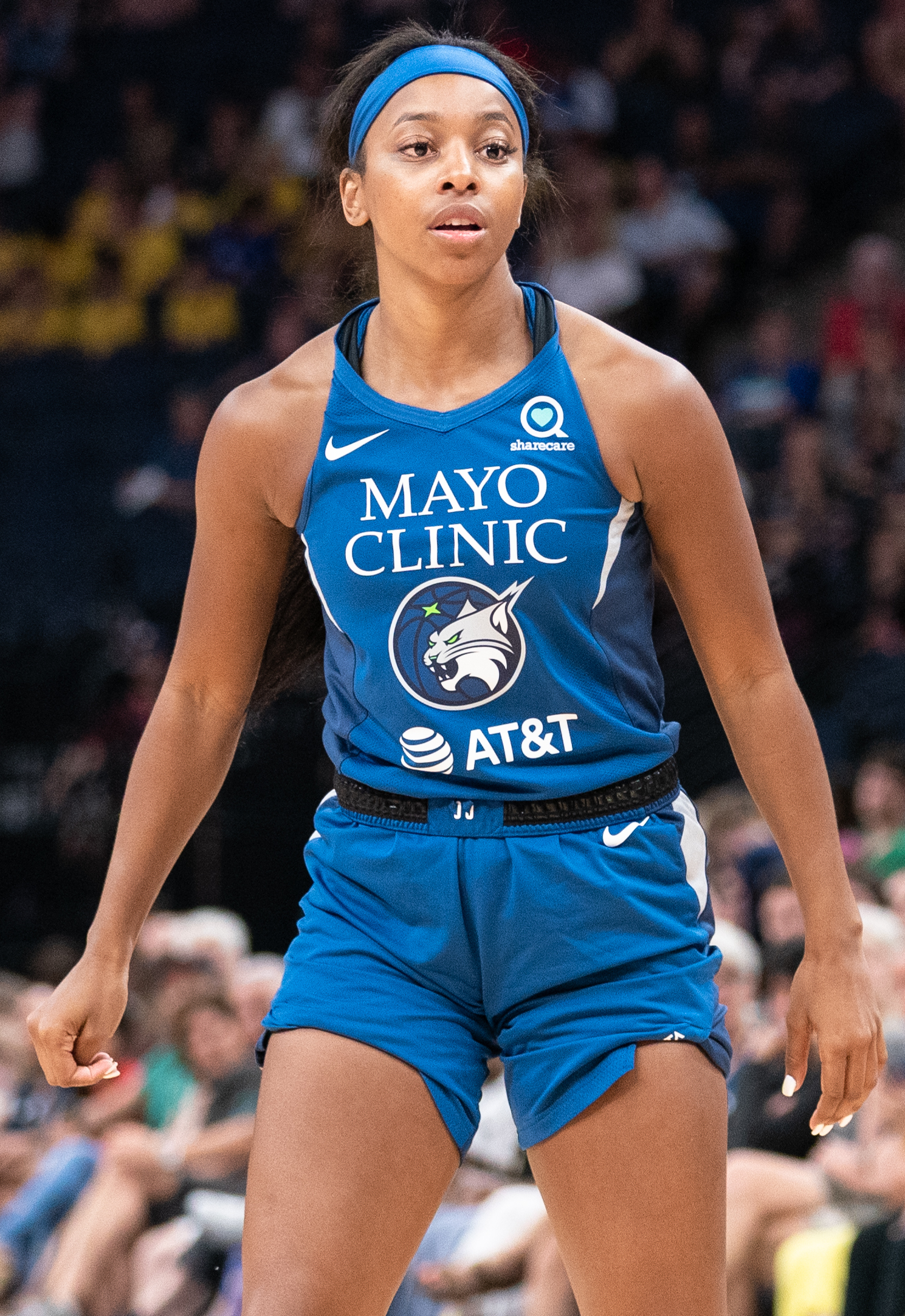
- Brown with the Minnesota Lynx in 2019

No. 8 – Free agent
- Position: Point guard / shooting guard
- League: WNBA

Personal information
- Born: October 27, 1994 (age 32) Boston, Massachusetts, U.S.
- Listed height: 5 ft 9 in (1.75 m)
- Listed weight: 162 lb (73 kg)

Career information
- High school: North Gwinnett (Suwanee, Georgia); Dr. Phillips (Orlando, Florida)
- College: Maryland (2013–2015); Duke (2016–2018)
- WNBA draft: 2018: 1st round, 9th overall pick
- Drafted by: Connecticut Sun
- Playing career: 2018–present

Career history
- 2018–2019: Connecticut Sun
- 2018–2019: CMB Cargo Uni Györ
- 2019–2020: Minnesota Lynx
- 2021: Chicago Sky
- 2021: Charnay
- 2022–2024: Los Angeles Sparks
- 2025–2026: Seattle Storm

Career highlights
- WNBA champion (2021); 3× Third-Team All-American – AP (2015, 2017, 2018); ACC Defensive Player of the Year (2018); 2× First-Team All – ACC Team (2017, 2018); 2× ACC All-Defensive Team (2017, 2018); Big Ten Tournament MOP (2015); Big Ten All-Defensive Team (2015); First-Team All-Big Ten (2015); ACC All-Freshman Team (2014); McDonald's All-American (2013)
- Stats at Basketball Reference
Medals
Women's Basketball
Representing United States
FIBA Under-18 Americas Championship
| Gold medal – first place | 2012 Puerto Rico | Team |

Alexis Kiah "Lexie" Brown (born October 27, 1994) is a retired American professional basketball player who most recently was a member of the Seattle Storm of the Women's National Basketball Association (WNBA). She previously played for the Chicago Sky, Minnesota Lynx, Connecticut Sun, and Los Angeles Sparks in the WNBA. She also plays for Athletes Unlimited Pro Basketball.

Brown was the ninth overall pick by the Sun in the 2018 WNBA draft. She played college basketball for the Maryland Terrapins and the Duke Blue Devils.

== Early life ==
Brown was born in Boston, Massachusetts, to Tammy and Dee Brown. Her father played twelve years in the NBA as a point guard, most notably for the Boston Celtics, with whom he won the 1991 Slam Dunk Contest.

Brown played her freshman season at Dr. Phillips High School in Orlando, Florida, where she helped the team achieve its first-ever undefeated regular season. After transferring to North Gwinnett in Suwanee, Georgia, she led her team to the state semifinals her junior year and the Class 5-A state championship game her senior year. Brown's high school career also featured stints with the A.O.T. AAU team and an appearance in the 2013 McDonald's All-American Game.

== College career ==
Brown elected to play college basketball at the University of Maryland. Her freshman year, she helped lead the team to the Final Four of the NCAA tournament, earning her the nickname "Big Shot Brown," and was named to the ACC All-Freshmen Team and ACC All-Academic Team. During a breakout sophomore campaign, she averaged 13.3 points per game and received many accolades, including All-Big Ten First Team, All-Big Ten Defensive Team, Big Ten Tournament Most Outstanding Player, Academic All-Big Ten, and AP Third Team All-American. Maryland again reached the Final Four, losing to the eventual champion UConn Huskies.

Wanting to be closer to home, Brown decided to transfer to Duke University following her sophomore year. After sitting out a season due to the NCAA's transfer rules, she worked her way into the starting lineup and helped the Blue Devils get back into the national spotlight. As a junior, Brown set an ACC record by draining 56 consecutive free throws and was named ACC Player of the Week on January 23, 2017.

== Professional career ==
=== WNBA ===
==== Connecticut Sun (2018–2019) ====
Brown was drafted by the Connecticut Sun as the 9th overall pick in the 2018 WNBA draft. Brown made her debut on May 20 against Las Vegas Aces scoring 5 points in 10 minutes of playing time. She played in 22 games in her rookie season, averaging 1.7 points in 5.6 minutes per game.

==== Minnesota Lynx (2019–2020) ====
After the 2019 WNBA draft, the Minnesota Lynx traded 18th pick Natisha Hiedeman to the Connecticut Sun in order to obtain Brown. Brown played a main role off the bench, as one of the main bench scorers. She scored a career-high 21 points on June 8, when the Lynx played the Los Angeles Sparks. She hit a season-high 5 3-pointers in that game, which she also tied two other times that year - July 24 vs. the Washington Mystics and August 20 vs. the Sparks.

On April 17, 2021, Brown was waived by Minnesota.

==== Chicago Sky (2021) ====
On 19 April 2021, Brown signed a training camp contract with the Chicago Sky. She was waived just before the season opener on May 13, but was ultimately re-signed on June 1. Chicago would go on to win the championship that year.

==== Los Angeles Sparks (2022–2024) ====
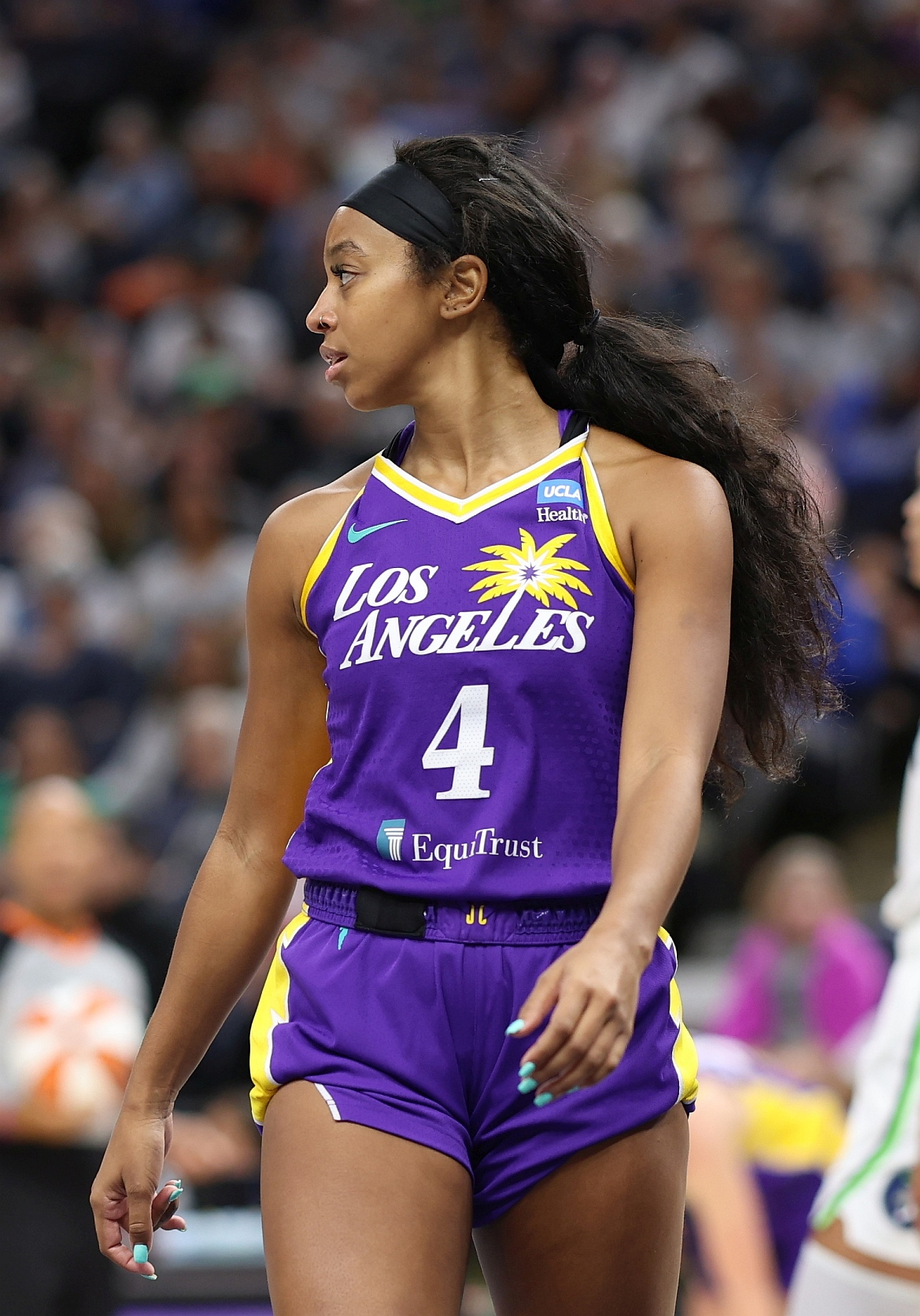
Brown with the Los Angeles Sparks in 2023

On March 30, 2022, Chicago dealt Brown to the Los Angeles Sparks in exchange for the rights to Li Yueru.

Brown spent the entirety of the 2023 season battling untreated and undiagnosed Crohn's disease.

==== Seattle Storm (2025–2026) ====
On February 14, 2025, Brown and the 26th pick in the 2025 WNBA draft were traded to the Seattle Storm in exchange for the 21st pick in the 2025 draft and a 2027 second round pick.

Brown was waived by the Storm on June 9, 2026.

=== Overseas ===
After the end of the 2018 WNBA season, Brown signed with CMB Cargo Uni Györ in Hungary's top woman's basketball league.

Brown played for Charnay from October to December 2021.

=== Athletes Unlimited ===
Brown has been a participant in Athletes Unlimited Pro Basketball since the league's inaugural season. She ranks among the league's all-time statistical leaders, including top placements in career leaderboard points, three-point field goals made, steals, assists, and quarter wins, and earned All-Defensive Team honors in 2022. During the 2024 season, Brown finished seventh in the final standings, averaging 16.0 points per game while ranking among the league leaders in steals and three-point shooting efficiency. In October 2025, Brown signed to return to Athletes Unlimited Pro Basketball for her fifth season with the league, continuing her participation as one of its most frequent competitors.

== Career statistics ==
Legend
| GP | Games played | GS | Games started | MPG | Minutes per game | RPG | Rebounds per game |
| APG | Assists per game | SPG | Steals per game | BPG | Blocks per game | PPG | Points per game |
| TO | Turnovers per game | FG% | Field-goal percentage | 3P% | 3-point field-goal percentage | FT% | Free-throw percentage |
| **Bold** | Career best | ° | League leader |

| † | Denotes seasons in which Brown won a WNBA championship |

=== WNBA ===
==== Regular season ====
Stats current through end of 2025 season

WNBA regular season statistics
| Year | Team | GP | GS | MPG | FG% | 3P% | FT% | RPG | APG | SPG | BPG | TO | PPG |
|---|---|---|---|---|---|---|---|---|---|---|---|---|---|
| 2018 | Connecticut | 22 | 0 | 5.6 | .273 | .310 | .571 | 0.8 | 0.5 | 0.2 | 0.0 | 0.5 | 1.7 |
| 2019 | Minnesota | 33 | 0 | 18.3 | .402 | .385 | .789 | 1.4 | 1.4 | 0.9 | 0.0 | 1.2 | 7.6 |
| 2020 | Minnesota | 17 | 13 | 22.0 | .342 | .269 | .792 | 1.9 | 2.4 | **1.8** | 0.0 | 1.4 | 6.4 |
| 2021^{†} | Chicago | 17 | 0 | 9.5 | .263 | .242 | — | 0.7 | 1.1 | 0.4 | 0.0 | 0.5 | 1.6 |
| 2022 | Los Angeles | **34** | **16** | 25.0 | .441 | .398 | .667 | **2.3** | 2.1 | 1.0 | 0.2 | 0.8 | 7.1 |
| 2023 | Los Angeles | 12 | 11 | **30.3** | **.486** | **.415** | .875 | 2.1 | 2.4 | 0.9 | **0.3** | 1.3 | **12.4** |
| 2024 | Los Angeles | 16 | 8 | 23.7 | .321 | .304 | **.889** | 2.3 | **3.3** | 1.1 | 0.1 | 1.9 | 8.1 |
| 2025 | Seattle | 24 | 0 | 9.5 | .354 | .270 | .700 | 0.7 | 1.0 | 0.4 | 0.0 | **0.3** | 2.1 |
| **Career** | 8 years, 5 teams | 175 | 48 | 17.6 | .388 | .351 | .797 | 1.5 | 1.7 | 0.8 | 0.1 | 0.9 | 5.7 |

==== Playoffs ====
WNBA playoff statistics
| Year | Team | GP | GS | MPG | FG% | 3P% | FT% | RPG | APG | SPG | BPG | TO | PPG |
|---|---|---|---|---|---|---|---|---|---|---|---|---|---|
| 2019 | Minnesota | 1 | 0 | **20.0** | .222 | .167 | — | **1.0** | **3.0** | 0.0 | 0.0 | 1.0 | **5.0** |
| 2021^{†} | Chicago | **7** | 0 | 3.4 | .333 | .400 | **1.000** | 0.3 | 0.1 | 0.0 | 0.0 | **0.0** | 1.1 |
| 2025 | Seattle | 1 | 0 | 7.0 | **.667** | **.500** | .000 | **1.0** | 0.0 | 0.0 | 0.0 | **0.0** | **5.0** |
| **Career** | 3 years, 3 teams | 9 | 0 | 5.7 | .333 | .308 | 1.000 | 0.4 | 0.4 | 0.0 | 0.0 | 0.1 | 2.0 |

=== College ===
NCAA statistics
| Year | Team | GP | GS | MPG | FG% | 3P% | FT% | RPG | APG | SPG | BPG | TO | PPG |
|---|---|---|---|---|---|---|---|---|---|---|---|---|---|
| 2013–14 | Maryland | 34 | 29 | 27.4 | .427 | .367 | .774 | 1.9 | 4.3 | 1.4 | **0.2** | **2.3** | 10.1 |
| 2014–15 | Maryland | **36** | **36** | 31.8 | .414 | .345 | .830 | 3.3 | **4.5** | 2.2 | 0.0 | 2.7 | 13.3 |
| 2015–16 | Did not play (NCAA transfer rules) | | | | | | | | | | | | |
| 2016–17 | Duke | 34 | 34 | 33.9 | **.488** | **.399** | **.928** | 3.7 | 3.9 | 2.8 | 0.0 | 2.7 | 18.3 |
| 2017–18 | Duke | 33 | 33 | **35.3** | .463 | .371 | .828 | **4.4** | 4.4 | **3.7** | '**0.2** | 3.1 | **19.4** |
| **Career** | | 137 | 132 | 32.1 | .447 | .369 | .841 | 3.3 | 4.3 | 2.5 | 0.1 | 2.7 | 15.2 |
