= Isabelle Harrison =

American basketball player (born 1993)

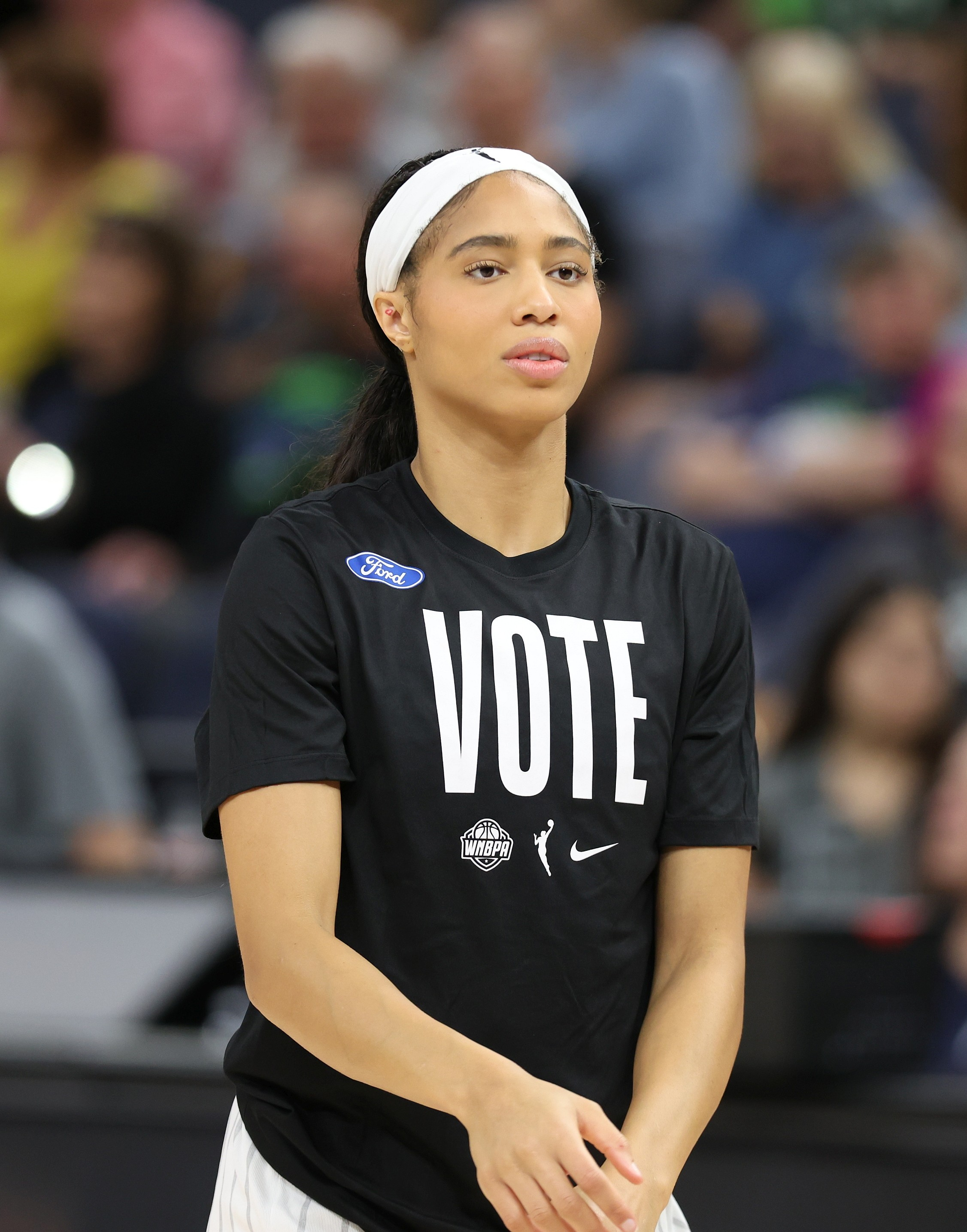
- Harrison with Chicago Sky in 2024

No. 21 – Toronto Tempo
- Position: Power forward
- League: WNBA

Personal information
- Born: September 27, 1993 (age 33) Nashville, Tennessee, U.S.
- Listed height: 6 ft 3 in (1.91 m)
- Listed weight: 193 lb (88 kg)

Career information
- High school: Hillsboro (Nashville, Tennessee)
- College: Tennessee (2011–2015)
- WNBA draft: 2015: 1st round, 12th overall pick
- Drafted by: Phoenix Mercury
- Playing career: 2016–present

Career history
- 2016: Phoenix Mercury
- 2016–2017: CCC Polkowice
- 2017–2018: San Antonio Stars / Las Vegas Aces
- 2017–2018: Bucheon Hana 1Q
- 2018–2019: Dike Napoli
- 2019: USK Praha
- 2019–2022: Dallas Wings
- 2020–2021: Virtus Eirene Ragusa
- 2023–2024: Chicago Sky
- 2024: USK Praha
- 2025: New York Liberty
- 2026–present: Toronto Tempo

Career highlights
- 2× First-team All-SEC (2014, 2015); SEC Tournament MVP (2014)
- Stats at WNBA.com
- Stats at Basketball Reference

Isabelle Harrison (born September 27, 1993 is an American professional basketball player for the Toronto Tempo of the Women's National Basketball Association (WNBA) and for the Mist of Unrivaled.

== College career ==
Harrison tore her ACL in February 2015 during a game against Kentucky. She became the 34th Lady Volunteer to be selected in the WNBA draft, and the first since 2012 WNBA draft, when Glory Johnson and Kelley Cain were drafted.

== Professional career ==
=== WNBA ===
Harrison was drafted 12th overall by the Phoenix Mercury in the 2015 WNBA draft. She sat out the 2015 season due to a torn ACL from her senior year at Tennessee. She made her debut in 2016. In her rookie season, she averaged 3.1 points per game and 1.8 rebounds per game in 26 games as a reserve for the Mercury.

In 2017, Harrison was traded to the San Antonio Stars along with a first round draft pick in exchange for Danielle Robinson.

On May 16, 2019, Harrison was traded to the Dallas Wings.

Harrison signed with the Chicago Sky on February 2, 2023 during free agency. She was sidelined for her entire first season with a torn left meniscus that required surgery.

Harrison signed with the New York Liberty on February 21, 2025 in open free agency.

In 2026, she signed a one-year contract with the Toronto Tempo.

=== Athletes Unlimited ===
Harrison has competed in Athletes Unlimited Pro Basketball since the league's early seasons. During the 2025 season, she finished eighth on the final leaderboard, ranking among the league leaders in both scoring and rebounding. Harrison recorded multiple 20-point performances and helped set a league record for single-week win points. In August 2025, Harrison signed to return to Athletes Unlimited Pro Basketball for her fifth season with the league, competing again in Nashville.

== Career statistics ==
Legend
GP	Games played	GS	Games started	MPG	Minutes per game	RPG	Rebounds per game
APG	Assists per game	SPG	Steals per game	BPG	Blocks per game	PPG	Points per game
TO	Turnovers per game	FG%	Field-goal percentage	3P%	3-point field-goal percentage	FT%	Free-throw percentage
**Bold**	Career best	°	League leader

=== WNBA ===
==== Regular season ====
WNBA regular season statistics
Year	Team	GP	GS	MPG	FG%	3P%	FT%	RPG	APG	SPG	BPG	TO	PPG
2015	Did not play (due to injury)												
2016	Phoenix	26	1	7.5	.525	—	.680	1.8	.0	.4	.1	**.7**	3.1
2017	San Antonio	34	**33**	**26.6**	.500	.500	.635	6.4	1.4	.8	.7	2.0	11.4
2018	Did not play (due to illness)												
2019	Dallas	31	29	25.6	.456	.000	.716	5.8	1.4	**1.1**	**.8**	1.5	8.6
2020	Dallas	13	11	19.8	.447	.000	.789	4.6	**1.5**	.7	.4	1.4	6.4
2021	Dallas	28	5	23.8	**.538**	.000	.783	5.9	1.1	**1.1**	.7	1.5	10.9
2022	Dallas	35	18	18.4	.466	**1.000**	**.867**	4.3	1.3	.7	.1	1.3	8.7
2023	Did not play (due to injury)												
2024	Chicago	**36**	5	16.3	.399	.167	.820	3.9	.8	.6	.3	1.1	6.5
2025	New York	34	1	10.6	.485	.267	.767	2.6	.7	.6	.1	**.7**	4.9
2026	Toronto	32	26	23.7	.425	.278	.730	**6.9**	**1.5**	.8	.7	1.8	**12.8**
**Career**	9 years, 6 teams	269	129	19.2	.466	.254	.749	4.7	1.1	.8	.4	1.3	8.3

==== Playoffs ====
WNBA playoff statistics
Year	Team	GP	GS	MPG	FG%	3P%	FT%	RPG	APG	SPG	BPG	TO	PPG
2016	Phoenix	**3**	0	13.7	.615	—	.000	6.0	.0	.0	.0	.7	5.3
2021	Dallas	1	0	**29.0**	.308	—	.500	**10.0**	**1.0**	.0	.0	1.0	**9.0**
2022	Dallas	**3**	**2**	12.3	.538	—	**1.000**	1.7	.3	.3	.0	.3	5.3
2025	New York	1	0	7.0	**1.000**	—	.000	2.0	.0	**2.0**	.0	**.0**	4.0
**Career**	4 years, 3 teams	8	2	14.3	.512	—	.375	4.4	.3	.4	.0	.5	5.6

=== College ===
NCAA statistics
Year	Team	GP	Points	FG%	3P%	FT%	RPG	APG	SPG	BPG	PPG
2011–12	Tennessee	31	102	.367	.000	.621	2.7	.1	.2	.5	3.3
2012–13	Tennessee	25	238	.485	—	**.698**	7.5	.9	**1.0**	**2.1**	9.5
2013–14	Tennessee	**35**	**475**	**.577**	—	.669	**9.3**	**1.0**	.9	1.0	**13.6**
2014–15	Tennessee	21	256	.471	—	.644	8.6	.7	.6	1.2	12.2
**Career**		112	1071	.504	.000	.660	6.9	.7	.7	1.2	9.6

== Off the court ==
=== Personal life ===
She is the daughter of former NFL defensive end Dennis Harrison Jr. As of 2025, Harrison is dating Natasha Cloud.

=== Philanthropy ===
In February 2024, Harrison joined the WNBA Changemakers Collective and their collaboration with VOICEINSPORT (VIS) as a mentor, "aimed at keeping girls in sport and developing diverse leaders on the court and beyond the game."
