= 2024 WNBA Commissioner's Cup =

WNBA Commissioner's Cup

2024 WNBA Commissioner's Cup Game
Cup Final
| Minnesota Lynx | New York Liberty |
| (4-1) | (5-0) |
|---|---|
| 94 | 89 |
| Head coach: Cheryl Reeve | Head coach: Sandy Brondello |
| | 1 | 2 | 3 | 4 | Total |
|---|---|---|---|---|---|
| Minnesota Lynx | 23 | 24 | 19 | 28 | 94 |
| New York Liberty | 27 | 23 | 10 | 29 | 89 |
- Date: Regular Season: June 1-13, 2024; Championship: June 25, 2024
- Venue: Local WNBA Arenas (Regular Season); UBS Arena (Championship)
- MVP: Napheesa Collier (MIN)

The 2024 WNBA Commissioner's Cup (known for sponsorship reasons as the 2024 WNBA Commissioner's Cup presented by Coinbase) was the WNBA's fourth Commissioner's Cup in league history. The Cup featured a transition away from the ten-game format to a five-game format, with some teams only having two home games. The best team in cup play from each conference faces off in a championship game. The Cup was won by the Minnesota Lynx, the franchise's first Commissioner's Cup.

== Format ==
The team with the best record in cup games from each conference will play in the championship game against each other, with the team having the best record hosting the game. This season, the cup shifted to a five-game per team format instead of the previous ten games per team. All games were played between June 1, 2024 and June 13, 2024. The team with the best record hosted the Cup Final. With their 5–0 cup record, that was the New York Liberty. Their regular home arena, the Barclays Center, was unable to host due to the NBA draft being hosted there on June 26. Therefore, the final was hosted at the UBS Arena in the Nassau County community of Elmont.

== Funding to local non-profits ==
Each team selects a charity of their choice to represent, and support thought the Commissioner's Cup series.

| Team | Charity |
|---|---|
| Atlanta Dream | Helping Mamas |
| Chicago Sky | EverThrive Illinois |
| Connecticut Sun | Reproductive Equity Now |
| Dallas Wings | The Afiya Center |
| Indiana Fever | Indiana Black Expo |
| Las Vegas Aces | Reproductive Freedom for All |
| Los Angeles Sparks | Feminist Majority Foundation |
| Minnesota Lynx | Gender Justice |
| New York Liberty | Women Creating Change |
| Phoenix Mercury | Arizona Coalition for Change |
| Seattle Storm | Pro Choice Washington |
| Washington Mystics | Vote 411 |

== Standings ==
Eastern Conference

| Pos | Team | Pld | W | L | PF | PA | PD | GB | Qualification | NYL | CON | IND | WAS | CHI | ATL |
|---|---|---|---|---|---|---|---|---|---|---|---|---|---|---|---|
| 1 | New York Liberty | 5 | 5 | 0 | 445 | 367 | +78 | — | Advance to Championship Game | — | | 104–68 | 93–88 | | |
| 2 | Connecticut Sun | 5 | 4 | 1 | 392 | 338 | +54 | 1 | | 75–82 | — | 89–72 | 76–59 | | |
| 3 | Indiana Fever | 5 | 3 | 2 | 387 | 430 | −43 | 2 | | | | — | | 71–70 | 91–84 |
| 4 | Washington Mystics | 5 | 1 | 4 | 388 | 401 | −13 | 4 | | | | 83–85 | — | 71–79 | |
| 5 | Chicago Sky | 5 | 1 | 4 | 379 | 402 | −23 | 4 | | 75–88 | 75–83 | | | — | 80–89 |
| 6 | Atlanta Dream | 5 | 1 | 4 | 352 | 405 | −53 | 4 | | 61–78 | 50–69 | | 68–87 | | — |

Source: WNBA

Western Conference

| Pos | Team | Pld | W | L | PF | PA | PD | GB | Qualification | MIN | SEA | PHO | LAS | LVA | DAL |
|---|---|---|---|---|---|---|---|---|---|---|---|---|---|---|---|
| 1 | Minnesota Lynx | 5 | 4 | 1 | 436 | 369 | +67 | — | Advance to Championship Game | — | 83–64 | | | | 87–76 |
| 2 | Seattle Storm | 5 | 4 | 1 | 409 | 373 | +36 | — | | | — | 80–62 | 95–79 | | |
| 3 | Phoenix Mercury | 5 | 3 | 2 | 426 | 421 | +5 | 1 | | 81–80 | | — | 87–68 | 99–103 | |
| 4 | Los Angeles Sparks | 5 | 2 | 3 | 386 | 432 | −46 | 2 | | 62–86 | | | — | 96–92 | 81–72 |
| 5 | Las Vegas Aces | 5 | 2 | 3 | 441 | 454 | −13 | 2 | | 86–100 | 65–78 | | | — | |
| 6 | Dallas Wings | 5 | 0 | 5 | 403 | 452 | −49 | 4 | | | 84–92 | 90–97 | | 81–95 | — |

Source: WNBA

== Game summary ==
Amazon Prime

June 25
8:00 PM EST

Box Score

Minnesota Lynx 94, New York Liberty 89
Scoring by quarter: 23-27, 24-23, 19-10, 28-29
| Pts: Bridget Carleton (23); Rebs: N. Collier and A. Smith (6); Asts: Napheesa Collier (6) | Pts: Breanna Stewart (24); Rebs: Jonquel Jones (12); Asts: Betnijah Laney-Hamilton (6) |

UBS Arena, Elmont, NY
Attendance: 7,015
Referees: Roy Gulbeyan
Eric Brewton
Angelica Suffren

== Team rosters ==
=== New York Liberty ===
2024 New York Liberty roster
Players
Coaches

| Pos. | No. | Nat. | Name | Height | Weight | DOB | From | Yrs |
|---|---|---|---|---|---|---|---|---|
| G/F | 2 | (United States) | Burke, Kennedy | 6' 1" (1.85m) | 182 lb (83kg) | 1997-02-14 | UCLA | 4 |
| G | 1 | (United States) | Davis, Marquesha | 6' 0" (1.83m) | | 2001-05-29 | Mississippi | R |
| G | 18 | (Croatia) | Dojkić, Ivana | 5' 11" (1.8m) | 154 lb (70kg) | 1997-12-24 | Croatia | 1 |
| F | 13 | (Germany) | Fiebich, Leonie | 6' 4" (1.93m) | | 2000-01-10 | Germany | R |
| G | 20 | (United States) | Ionescu, Sabrina | 5' 11" (1.8m) | 165 lb (75kg) | 1997-12-06 | Oregon | 4 |
| C | 35 | (The Bahamas) | Jones, Jonquel | 6' 6" (1.98m) | 215 lb (98kg) | 1994-01-05 | George Washington | 7 |
| G/F | 44 | (United States) | Laney, Betnijah | 6' 0" (1.83m) | 166 lb (75kg) | 1993-10-29 | Rutgers | 8 |
| C | 8 | (Germany) | Sabally, Nyara (injured) | 6' 5" (1.96m) | 204 lb (93kg) | 2000-02-26 | Oregon | 1 |
| F | 30 | (United States) | Stewart, Breanna | 6' 4" (1.93m) | 170 lb (77kg) | 1994-08-27 | Connecticut | 7 |
| F | 5 | (United States) | Thornton, Kayla | 6' 1" (1.85m) | 188 lb (85kg) | 1992-10-20 | UTEP | 8 |
| G | 22 | (Hungary) | Vandersloot, Courtney | 5' 8" (1.73m) | 137 lb (62kg) | 1989-02-08 | Gonzaga | 13 |

Head coach
(Australia) Sandy Brondello (Western Sydney)
Assistant coaches
(Germany) Olaf Lange
(United States) Roneeka Hodges (Florida State)
(United States) Zach O'Brien (Saint Joseph's College of Maine)
Athletic trainer
(United States) Terri Acosta
Strength and conditioning coach
(United States) Emily Zaler

Legend

- (C) Team captain
- (DP) Unsigned draft pick
- (FA) Free agent
- (S) Suspended
- Injured

=== Depth ===
| Pos. | Starter | Bench |
|---|---|---|
| PG | Sabrina Ionescu | Courtney Vandersloot; Marquesha Davis |
| SG | Betnijah Laney-Hamilton | Ivana Dojkić |
| SF | Kayla Thornton | Leonie Fiebich |
| PF | Breanna Stewart | Kennedy Burke |
| C | Jonquel Jones | Nyara Sabally |

=== Minnesota Lynx ===
2024 Minnesota Lynx roster
Players
Coaches

| Pos. | No. | Nat. | Name | Height | Weight | DOB | From | Yrs |
|---|---|---|---|---|---|---|---|---|
| G/F | 6 | (Canada) | Carleton, Bridget | 6' 1" (1.85m) | 190 lb (86kg) | 1997-05-22 | Iowa State | 5 |
| F | 24 | (United States) | Collier, Napheesa | 6' 2" (1.88m) | 185 lb (84kg) | 1996-09-23 | Connecticut | 5 |
| G | 2 | (United States) | Hiedeman, Natisha | 5' 8" (1.73m) | 135 lb (61kg) | 1997-02-10 | Marquette | 5 |
| G/F | 14 | (Hungary) | Juhász, Dorka | 6' 5" (1.96m) | 192 lb (87kg) | 1999-12-18 | Connecticut | 1 |
| F | 3 | (Mali) | Koné, Sika | 6' 4" (1.93m) | 180 lb (82kg) | 2002-07-13 | Mali | 1 |
| G | 21 | (United States) | McBride, Kayla | 5' 10" (1.78m) | 186 lb (84kg) | 1992-06-25 | Notre Dame | 10 |
| G | 1 | (United States) | Miller, Diamond (injured) | 6' 3" (1.91m) | 163 lb (74kg) | 2001-02-11 | Maryland | 1 |
| F | 35 | (United States) | Pili, Alissa | 6' 2" (1.88m) | 235 lb (107kg) | 2001-06-08 | Utah | R |
| F | 8 | (Australia) | Smith, Alanna | 6' 4" (1.93m) | 180 lb (82kg) | 1996-09-10 | Stanford | 5 |
| G | 10 | (United States) | Williams, Courtney | 5' 8" (1.73m) | 133 lb (60kg) | 1994-05-11 | South Florida | 8 |
| F | 9 | (Italy) | Zandalasini, Cecilia | 6' 2" (1.88m) | 175 lb (79kg) | 1996-03-16 | Italy | 2 |
| G | 0 | (France) | Époupa, Olivia | 5' 5" (1.65m) | 119 lb (54kg) | 1994-04-30 | France | R |

Head coach
(United States) Cheryl Reeve (La Salle)
Assistant coaches
(United States) Katie Smith (Ohio State)
(United States) Rebekkah Brunson (Georgetown)
(United States) Elaine Powell (LSU)
Athletic trainer
(United States) Chuck Barta (UW–La Crosse)
Assistant trainer
(United States) Brandi BlueArm (Minnesota State)

Legend

- (C) Team captain
- (DP) Unsigned draft pick
- (FA) Free agent
- (S) Suspended
- Injured

=== Depth ===
| Pos. | Starter | Bench |
|---|---|---|
| PG | Courtney Williams | Natisha Hiedeman |
| SG | Kayla McBride | Olivia Époupa |
| SF | Bridget Carleton | Cecilia Zandalasini; Diamond Miller |
| PF | Napheesa Collier | Alissa Pili |
| C | Alanna Smith | Dorka Juhász; Sika Koné |
