= 2025 New York Liberty season =

- Head coach: Sandy Brondello
- Arena: Barclays Center

Results
- Record: 27–17 (.614)
- Place: 2nd (Eastern)
- Playoff finish: 5th seed Lost in First Round 1–2 to Phoenix Mercury

Media
- Television: WWOR-TV; WNYW

The 2025 New York Liberty season was the 29th season for the New York Liberty franchise of the WNBA, and their fourth season under head coach, Sandy Brondello. The season tipped off on Saturday, May 17, 2025, against the Las Vegas Aces at home.

== Draft ==
| Round | Pick | Player | Position | Nationality | Club | Outcome | Ref. |
|---|---|---|---|---|---|---|---|
| 3 | 38 | Adja Kane | C | France | Landerneau Bretagne Basket | Rights retained | |

== Transactions ==
=== Front office and coaching ===
| Date | Details | Ref. |
|---|---|---|
| January 13 | Hired Sonia Raman as assistant coach | |

=== Trades ===
March
| March 16 | To New York Liberty Natasha Cloud | To Connecticut Sun 2025 No. 7 draft pick 2026 first round draft pick |

=== Free agency ===
==== Core designation ====
| Player | Date | Notes | Ref. |
|---|---|---|---|
| Breanna Stewart | January 13 | Accepted core offer on March 29 (Signed one-year deal) | |

==== Re-signed / extensions ====
| Player | Date | Notes | Ref. |
|---|---|---|---|
| Jaylyn Sherrod | January 15 | Training camp contract | |
| Rebekah Gardner | January 15 | Training camp contract | |
| Kennedy Burke | February 1 | Training camp contract | |
| Nyara Sabally | May 12 | Exercised team option (Fourth-year) | |
| Leonie Fiebich | June 30 | Set as active | |

==== Additions ====
| Player | Date | Notes | Former Team | Ref. |
|---|---|---|---|---|
| Raquel Carrera | February 1 | Training camp contract | Valencia Basket | |
| Esmery Martínez | February 1 | Training camp contract | Flammes Carolo Basket | |
| Kaitlyn Davis | February 12 | Training camp contract | Rojas de Veracruz | |
| Isabelle Harrison | February 21 | Training camp contract | Chicago Sky | |
| Seehia Ridard | March 13 | Training camp contract | Sedis Cadí La Seu | |
| Marine Johannès | March 21 | Training camp contract | Çimsa ÇBK Mersin | |
| Annika Soltau | April 22 | Training camp contract | Rutronik Stars Keltern | |
| Leaonna Odom | April 24 | Training camp contract | | |
| Stephanie Talbot | July 21 | Rest of season contract | Free agent | |
| Emma Meesseman | August 1 | Rest of season contract | Free agent | |

=== Subtractions / unsigned ===
| Player | Date | Reason | New Team | Ref. |
|---|---|---|---|---|
| Marine Fauthoux | April 15, 2021 | Unsigned draft pick (2021 draft pick – No. 29) | N/A – retained rights | |
| Han Xu | September 10, 2023 | Suspended contract – temporary | | |
| Kayla Thornton | December 6, 2024 | Expansion draft | Golden State Valkyries | |
| Raquel Carrera | December 31, 2024 | Rights renounced | N/A (Note: Carrera later signed training camp contract with club in February 2025, but their contract was suspended in April 2025.) | |
| Raquel Carrera | April 21, 2025 | Suspended contract – full season | N/A – retained rights | |
| Kaitlyn Davis | December 31, 2024 | Rights renounced | N/A (Note: Davis signed training camp contract with club in February 2025.) | |
| Kaitlyn Davis | May 2, 2025 | Waived | — | |
| Ivana Dojkić | January 11, 2025 | Free agency – reserved (qualifying offer extended) | Not signed – rights retained | |
| Courtney Vandersloot | February 1, 2025 | Free agency – unrestricted | Chicago Sky | |
| Adja Kane | April 14, 2025 | Unsigned draft pick (2025 draft pick – No. 38) | N/A – retained rights | |
| Seehia Ridard | April 21, 2025 | Suspended contract – full season | N/A – retained rights | |
| Annika Soltau | May 13, 2025 | Suspended contract – full season | N/A – retained rights | |
| Betnijah Laney-Hamilton | May 14, 2025 | Suspended contract – full season | N/A – retained rights | |
| Esmery Martínez | May 15, 2025 | Waived | — | |
| Leaonna Odom | May 15, 2025 | Waived | — | |
| Leonie Fiebich | June 12, 2025 | Suspended contract – temporary | N/A – retained rights | |
| Marquesha Davis | July 13, 2025 | Waived | — | |
| Jaylyn Sherrod | August 1 | Waived | Minnesota Lynx | |

== Roster ==
2025 New York Liberty roster
Players
Coaches

| Pos. | No. | Nat. | Name | Height | Weight | DOB | From | Yrs |
|---|---|---|---|---|---|---|---|---|
| G/F | 22 | (United States) | Burke, Kennedy | 6' 1" (1.85m) | 182 lb (83kg) | 1997-02-14 | UCLA | 5 |
| G | 9 | (United States) | Cloud, Natasha | 5' 10" (1.78m) | 160 lb (73kg) | 1992-02-22 | Saint Joseph's | 9 |
| F | 13 | (Germany) | Fiebich, Leonie | 6' 4" (1.93m) | | 2000-01-10 | Germany | 1 |
| G | 7 | (United States) | Gardner, Rebekah | 6' 1" (1.85m) | 130 lb (59kg) | 1990-07-09 | UCLA | 2 |
| F | 21 | (United States) | Harrison, Isabelle | 6' 3" (1.91m) | 183 lb (83kg) | 1993-09-27 | Tennessee | 7 |
| G | 20 | (United States) | Ionescu, Sabrina | 5' 11" (1.8m) | 165 lb (75kg) | 1997-12-06 | Oregon | 5 |
| G | 23 | (France) | Johannès, Marine | 5' 10" (1.78m) | 134 lb (61kg) | 1995-01-21 | France | 3 |
| C | 35 | (The Bahamas) | Jones, Jonquel | 6' 6" (1.98m) | 215 lb (98kg) | 1994-01-05 | George Washington | 8 |
| F | 33 | (Belgium) | Meesseman, Emma | 6' 4" (1.93m) | 191 lb (87kg) | 1993-05-13 | Belgium | 8 |
| C | 8 | (Germany) | Sabally, Nyara | 6' 5" (1.96m) | 204 lb (93kg) | 2000-02-26 | Oregon | 2 |
| F | 30 | (United States) | Stewart, Breanna | 6' 4" (1.93m) | 170 lb (77kg) | 1994-08-27 | Connecticut | 8 |
| F | 6 | (Australia) | Talbot, Stephanie | 6' 2" (1.88m) | 192 lb (87kg) | 1994-06-15 | Australia | 6 |
| C | – | (Spain) | Carrera, Raquel (S) | 6' 3" (1.91m) | | 2001-10-31 | Spain | – |
| G | – | (Croatia) | Dojkić, Ivana (FA) | 5' 11" (1.8m) | 154 lb (70kg) | 1997-12-24 | Croatia | 2 |
| G | – | (France) | Fauthoux, Marine (DP) | 5' 9" (1.75m) | | 2001-01-23 | France | – |
| C | – | (China) | Han Xu (S) | 6' 11" (2.11m) | 203 lb (92kg) | 1999-10-31 | China | 3 |
| C | – | (France) | Kane, Adja (DP) | 6' 3" (1.91m) | | 2005-03-30 | France | – |
| G/F | – | (United States) | Laney-Hamilton, Betnijah (injured) (S) | 6' 0" (1.83m) | 166 lb (75kg) | 1993-10-29 | Rutgers | 9 |
| F | – | (France) | Ridard, Seehia (injured) (S) | 6' 2" (1.88m) | | 2002-08-09 | France | – |
| F | – | (Germany) | Soltau, Annika (S) | 6' 4" (1.93m) | | 2005-03-25 | Germany | – |

Head coach
(Australia) Sandy Brondello
Assistant coaches
(Germany) Olaf Lange
(United States) Zach O'Brien (St. Joseph's (ME))
(United States) Sonia Raman (Tufts)
Athletic trainer
Terri Acosta
Strength and conditioning coach
Emily Zaler

Legend

- (C) Team captain
- (DP) Unsigned draft pick
- (FA) Free agent
- (S) Suspended
- Injured

=== Depth chart ===
| Pos. | Starter | Bench |
|---|---|---|
| PG | Natasha Cloud |
| SG | Sabrina Ionescu | Marine Johannès |
| SF | Leonie Fiebich | Rebekah Gardner |
| PF | Breanna Stewart | Kennedy Burke; Isabelle Harrison; Stephanie Talbot |
| C | Jonquel Jones | Nyara Sabally |

== Schedule ==
=== Preseason ===
2025 pre-season game log
Total: 1–1 (Home: 1–1; Road: 0–0)
May: 1–1 (Home: 1–1; Road: 0–0)

| Game | Date | Team | Score | High points | High rebounds | High assists | Location Attendance | Record |
|---|---|---|---|---|---|---|---|---|
| 1 | May 9 | Connecticut | L 86–94 | Marine Johannès (12) | Isabelle Harrison (5) | Sabrina Ionescu (6) | Barclays Center; 8,395 | 0–1 |
| 2 | May 12 | (Japan) Toyota Antelopes | W 84–61 | Sabrina Ionescu (25) | Jones, Sabally (5) | Natasha Cloud (6) | Matthew Knight Arena; 12,364 | 1–1 |

2025 pre-season schedule

=== Regular season ===
2025 game log
Total: 27–17 (Home: 17–5; Road: 10–12)
May: 6–0 (Home: 3–0; Road: 3–0)

| Game | Date | Team | Score | High points | High rebounds | High assists | Location Attendance | Record |
|---|---|---|---|---|---|---|---|---|
| 1 | May 17 | Las Vegas | W 92–78 | Breanna Stewart (25) | Jonquel Jones (10) | Natasha Cloud (9) | Barclays Center; 17,344 | 1–0 |
| 2 | May 22 | @ Chicago | W 99–74 | Natasha Cloud (18) | Jonquel Jones (7) | Natasha Cloud (8) | Wintrust Arena; 9,025 | 2–0 |
| 3 | May 24 | @ Indiana | W 90–88 | Jonquel Jones (26) | Jonquel Jones (12) | Natasha Cloud (6) | Gainbridge Fieldhouse; 17,274 | 3–0 |
| 4 | May 27 | Golden State | W 95–67 | Breanna Stewart (24) | Jonquel Jones (10) | Natasha Cloud (10) | Barclays Center; 14,774 | 4–0 |
| 5 | May 29 | Golden State | W 82–77 | Breanna Stewart (27) | Leonie Fiebich (8) | Natasha Cloud (5) | Barclays Center; 14,951 | 5–0 |
| 6 | May 30 | @ Washington | W 85–63 | Sabrina Ionescu (28) | Jonquel Jones (18) | Breanna Stewart (7) | CareFirst Arena; 4,200 | 6–0 |

June : 5–5 (Home: 3–1; Road: 2–4)

| Game | Date | Team | Score | High points | High rebounds | High assists | Location Attendance | Record |
|---|---|---|---|---|---|---|---|---|
| 7 | June 1 | Connecticut | W 100–52 | Sabrina Ionescu (18) | Jonquel Jones (11) | Natasha Cloud (7) | Barclays Center; 17,415 | 7–0 |
| 8 | June 5 | @ Washington | W 86–78 | Breanna Stewart (26) | Breanna Stewart (11) | Sabrina Ionescu (7) | CareFirst Arena; 4,200 | 8–0 |
| 9 | June 10 | Chicago | W 85–66 | Sabrina Ionescu (23) | Breanna Stewart (7) | Sabrina Ionescu (7) | Barclays Center; 16,081 | 9–0 |
| 10 | June 14 | @ Indiana | L 88–102 | Sabrina Ionescu (34) | Nyara Sabally (9) | Natasha Cloud (5) | Gainbridge Fieldhouse; 17,274 | 9–1 |
| 11 | June 17 | Atlanta | W 86–81 | Sabrina Ionescu (34) | Jonquel Jones (10) | Cloud, Ionescu (5) | Barclays Center; 15,149 | 10–1 |
| 12 | June 19 | Phoenix | L 81–89 | Breanna Stewart (35) | Nyara Sabally (7) | Natasha Cloud (10) | Barclays Center; 16,383 | 10–2 |
| 13 | June 22 | @ Seattle | L 79–89 | Breanna Stewart (18) | Sabally, Stewart (9) | Natasha Cloud (8) | Climate Pledge Arena; 12,500 | 10–3 |
| 14 | June 25 | @ Golden State | W 81–78 | Breanna Stewart (23) | Breanna Stewart (10) | Natasha Cloud (7) | Chase Center; 18,064 | 11–3 |
| 15 | June 27 | @ Phoenix | L 91–106 | Breanna Stewart (17) | Nyara Sabally (6) | Cloud, Ionescu (7) | PHX Arena; 12,009 | 11–4 |
| 16 | June 29 | @ Atlanta | L 81–90 | Breanna Stewart (21) | Breanna Stewart (9) | Natasha Cloud (6) | Gateway Center Arena; 3,265 | 11–5 |

July : 6–4 (Home: 6–2; Road: 0–2)

| Game | Date | Team | Score | High points | High rebounds | High assists | Location Attendance | Record |
|---|---|---|---|---|---|---|---|---|
| 17 | July 3 | Los Angeles | W 89–79 | Natasha Cloud (23) | Breanna Stewart (14) | Natasha Cloud (7) | Barclays Center; 15,956 | 12–5 |
| 18 | July 6 | Seattle | L 70–79 | Sabrina Ionescu (22) | Sabrina Ionescu (9) | Sabrina Ionescu (6) | Barclays Center; 15,515 | 12–6 |
| 19 | July 8 | Las Vegas | W 87–78 | Sabrina Ionescu (28) | Leonie Fiebich (9) | Sabrina Ionescu (8) | Barclays Center; 15,041 | 13–6 |
| 20 | July 13 | Atlanta | L 79–72 | Leonie Fiebich (21) | Breanna Stewart (10) | Sabrina Ionescu (5) | Barclays Center; 17,265 | 14–6 |
| 21 | July 16 | Indiana | W 98–77 | Breanna Stewart (24) | Breanna Stewart (11) | Sabrina Ionescu (9) | Barclays Center; 17,371 | 15–6 |
All-Star Game
| 22 | July 22 | Indiana | W 98–84 | Jonquel Jones (18) | Jonquel Jones (9) | Sabrina Ionescu (9) | Barclays Center; 17,365 | 16–6 |
| 23 | July 25 | Phoenix | W 89–76 | Sabrina Ionescu (29) | Jonquel Jones (11) | Sabrina Ionescu (8) | Barclays Center; 17,515 | 17–6 |
| 24 | July 26 | Los Angeles | L 99–101 | Sabrina Ionescu (30) | Ionescu, Jones (8) | Natasha Cloud (9) | Barclays Center; 16,024 | 17–7 |
| 25 | July 28 | @ Dallas | L 82–92 | Jonquel Jones (18) | Jonquel Jones (7) | Natasha Cloud (8) | College Park Center; 6,018 | 17–8 |
| 26 | July 30 | @ Minnesota | L 93–100 | Sabrina Ionescu (31) | Jonquel Jones (7) | Natasha Cloud (7) | Target Center; 10,824 | 17–9 |

August : 7–7 (Home: 4–2; Road: 3–5)

| Game | Date | Team | Score | High points | High rebounds | High assists | Location Attendance | Record |
|---|---|---|---|---|---|---|---|---|
| 27 | August 1 | @ Connecticut | L 62–78 | Sabrina Ionescu (23) | Ionescu, Talbot (7) | Sabrina Ionescu (5) | Mohegan Sun Arena; 8,664 | 17–10 |
| 28 | August 3 | @ Connecticut | W 87–78 | Sabrina Ionescu (36) | Sabrina Ionescu (11) | Cloud, Ionescu, Jones, Talbot (4) | Mohegan Sun Arena; 8,747 | 18–10 |
| 29 | August 5 | Dallas | W 85–76 | Jonquel Jones (15) | Jonquel Jones (10) | Natasha Cloud (6) | Barclays Center; 17,306 | 19–10 |
| 30 | August 8 | @ Dallas | W 88–77 | Sabrina Ionescu (16) | Emma Meesseman (8) | Emma Meesseman (7) | College Park Center; 6,251 | 20–10 |
| 31 | August 10 | Minnesota | L 71–83 | Natasha Cloud (14) | Cloud, Jones (6) | Cloud, Ionescu, Jones (5) | Barclays Center; 17,343 | 20–11 |
| 32 | August 12 | @ Los Angeles | W 105–97 | Emma Meesseman (24) | Jonquel Jones (11) | Sabrina Ionescu (6) | Crypto.com Arena; 11,862 | 21–11 |
| 33 | August 13 | @ Las Vegas | L 77–83 | Emma Meesseman (24) | Emma Meesseman (10) | Jonquel Jones (5) | Michelob Ultra Arena; 10,417 | 21–12 |
| 34 | August 16 | @ Minnesota | L 80–86 | Jonquel Jones (17) | Sabrina Ionescu (10) | Natasha Cloud (6) | Target Center; 10,810 | 21–13 |
| 35 | August 19 | Minnesota | W 85–75 | Jonquel Jones (22) | Jonquel Jones (10) | Sabrina Ionescu (11) | Barclays Center; 16,864 | 22–13 |
| 36 | August 21 | Chicago | L 85–91 | Jonquel Jones (25) | Jones, Meesseman (7) | Emma Meesseman (6) | Barclays Center; 15,887 | 22–14 |
| 37 | August 23 | @ Atlanta | L 62–78 | Kennedy Burke (13) | Jonquel Jones (8) | Marine Johannès (5) | Gateway Center Arena; 3,305 | 22–15 |
| 38 | August 25 | Connecticut | W 81–79 | Breanna Stewart (19) | Jonquel Jones (11) | Sabrina Ionescu (9) | Barclays Center; 15,011 | 23–15 |
| 39 | August 28 | Washington | W 89–63 | Isabelle Harrison (16) | Breanna Stewart (9) | Stephanie Talbot (6) | Barclays Center; 15,015 | 24–15 |
| 40 | August 30 | @ Phoenix | L 63–80 | Emma Meesseman (17) | Fiebich, Jones, Stewart (6) | Cloud, Jones (4) | PHX Arena; 13,252 | 24–16 |

September : 3–1 (Home: 1–0; Road: 2–1)

| Game | Date | Team | Score | High points | High rebounds | High assists | Location Attendance | Record |
|---|---|---|---|---|---|---|---|---|
| 41 | September 2 | @ Golden State | L 58–66 | Cloud, Stewart (19) | Burke, Cloud, Meesseman, Stewart (5) | Cloud, Fiebich (4) | Chase Center; 18,064 | 24–17 |
| 42 | September 5 | @ Seattle | W 84–76 | Breanna Stewart (24) | Cloud, Stewart (7) | Natasha Cloud (6) | Climate Pledge Arena; 12,500 | 25–17 |
| 43 | September 9 | Washington | W 75–66 | Emma Meesseman (19) | Jonquel Jones (11) | Sabrina Ionescu (9) | Barclays Center; 17,532 | 26–17 |
| 44 | September 11 | @ Chicago | W 91–86 | Breanna Stewart (24) | Meesseman, Stewart (6) | Sabrina Ionescu (11) | Wintrust Arena; 8,824 | 27–17 |

2025 season schedule

Notes:

- Games highlighted in ██ represent Commissioner's Cup games.

=== Playoffs ===
2025 playoff game log
First round vs. Phoenix Mercury

| Game | Date | Team | Score | High points | High rebounds | High assists | Location Attendance | Series |
|---|---|---|---|---|---|---|---|---|
| 1 | September 14 | @ Phoenix | W 76–69 (OT) | Natasha Cloud (23) | Jonquel Jones (12) | Sabrina Ionescu (7) | PHX Arena; 10,095 | 1–0 |
| 2 | September 17 | Phoenix | L 60–86 | Emma Meesseman (11) | Jonquel Jones (13) | Ionescu, Meesseman (3) | Barclays Center; 17,017 | 1–1 |
| 3 | September 19 | @ Phoenix | L 73–79 | Breanna Stewart (30) | Breanna Stewart (9) | Ionescu, Jones (4) | PHX Arena; 13,104 | 1–2 |

2025 playoff schedule

== Standings ==
| # | Team | W | L | PCT | GB | Conf. | Home | Road | Cup |
|---|---|---|---|---|---|---|---|---|---|
| 1 | yx – Minnesota Lynx | 34 | 10 | .773 | – | 20–4 | 20–2 | 14–8 | 5–1 |
| 2 | x – Las Vegas Aces | 30 | 14 | .682 | 4 | 16–8 | 17–5 | 13–9 | 2–4 |
| 3 | x – Atlanta Dream | 30 | 14 | .682 | 4 | 15–6 | 16–6 | 14–8 | 3–2 |
| 4 | x – Phoenix Mercury | 27 | 17 | .614 | 7 | 13–11 | 15–7 | 12–10 | 4–2 |
| 5 | x – New York Liberty | 27 | 17 | .614 | 7 | 15–5 | 17–5 | 10–12 | 4–1 |
| 6 | cx – Indiana Fever | 24 | 20 | .545 | 10 | 13–8 | 13–9 | 11–11 | 4–1 |
| 7 | x – Seattle Storm | 23 | 21 | .523 | 11 | 12–12 | 10–12 | 13–9 | 4–2 |
| 8 | x – Golden State Valkyries | 23 | 21 | .523 | 11 | 9–15 | 14–8 | 9–13 | 3–3 |
| 9 | e – Los Angeles Sparks | 21 | 23 | .477 | 13 | 10–14 | 9–13 | 12–10 | 2–4 |
| 10 | e – Washington Mystics | 16 | 28 | .364 | 18 | 8–12 | 10–12 | 6–16 | 2–3 |
| 11 | e – Connecticut Sun | 11 | 33 | .250 | 23 | 7–14 | 7–15 | 4–18 | 1–4 |
| 12 | e – Chicago Sky | 10 | 34 | .227 | 24 | 4–17 | 6–16 | 4–18 | 1–4 |
| 13 | e – Dallas Wings | 10 | 34 | .227 | 24 | 4–20 | 6–16 | 4–18 | 1–5 |

Notes

(#) – League Standing
c – Commissioner's Cup winners
y – Regular Season Champion
x – Clinched playoff berth
e – Eliminated from playoff contention
Source: Overall standings and Commissioner's Cup Standings

== Playoffs ==
First Round: Best-of-3
**1** | **Minnesota Lynx** | **2**
8 | Golden State Valkyries | 0
4 | **Phoenix Mercury** | 2
5 | New York Liberty | 1
2 | **Las Vegas Aces** | **2**
7 | Seattle Storm | 1
3 | Atlanta Dream | 1
6 | **Indiana Fever** | **2**

Semifinals: Best-of-5
1 | Minnesota Lynx | 1
4 | **Phoenix Mercury** | **3**
2 | **Las Vegas Aces** | **3**
6 | Indiana Fever | 2

Finals: Best-of-7
4 | Phoenix Mercury | 0
2 | **Las Vegas Aces** | **4**

- **Bold** – Series winner
- Italic – Team with home-court-advantage

== Statistics ==
Legend
| GP | Games played | GS | Games started | MPG | Minutes per game | RPG | Rebounds per game |
| APG | Assists per game | SPG | Steals per game | BPG | Blocks per game | PPG | Points per game |
| FG% | Field-goal percentage | 3P% | 3-point field-goal percentage | FT% | Free-throw percentage | TO | Turnovers per game |
| PF | Fouls per game | | Team leader | | League leader |

=== Regular season ===
| Player | GP | GS | MPG | FG% | 3P% | FT% | RPG | APG | SPG | BPG | TO | PPG |
|---|---|---|---|---|---|---|---|---|---|---|---|---|
| Sabrina Ionescu | 38 | 38 | 31.4 | 40.1% | 29.9% | 93.3% | 4.9 | 5.7 | 1.3 | 0.4 | 2.6 | 18.2 |
| Breanna Stewart | 31 | 31 | 30.6 | 46.1% | 24.1% | 83.7% | 6.5 | 3.5 | 1.4 | 1.4 | 1.9 | 18.3 |
| Natasha Cloud | 41 | 41 | 29.0 | 43.3% | 33.8% | 87.0% | 3.7 | 5.1 | 1.2 | 0.3 | 1.9 | 10.1 |
| Leonie Fiebich | 37 | 37 | 28.1 | 48.9% | 42.5% | 87.1% | 3.5 | 1.7 | 0.9 | 0.4 | 1.2 | 8.7 |
| Jonquel Jones | 31 | 31 | 26.8 | 49.0% | 42.4% | 76.9% | 8.1 | 2.7 | 0.5 | 1.1 | 2.1 | 13.6 |
| Emma Meesseman | 17 | 12 | 25.9 | 57.2% | 66.7% | 86.5% | 5.1 | 3.2 | 1.2 | 0.8 | 2.1 | 13.4 |
| Kennedy Burke | 36 | 9 | 21.6 | 46.8% | 41.4% | 75.9% | 2.4 | 1.3 | 0.8 | 0.4 | 0.9 | 8.1 |
| Marine Johannès | 44 | 5 | 18.3 | 39.7% | 34.4% | 84.2% | 1.9 | 1.6 | 0.6 | 0.3 | 1.2 | 6.4 |
| Nyara Sabally | 17 | 10 | 17.9 | 48.7% | 14.3% | 68.0% | 4.5 | 0.8 | 0.5 | 1.0 | 0.9 | 5.4 |
| Stephanie Talbot | 22 | 0 | 12.4 | 42.2% | 33.3% | 64.3% | 2.2 | 1.5 | 0.5 | 0.2 | 1.0 | 2.5 |
| Rebekah Gardner | 41 | 5 | 12.2 | 50.0% | 47.6% | 81.5% | 1.8 | 0.6 | 0.6 | 0.2 | 0.6 | 3.7 |
| Isabelle Harrison | 34 | 1 | 10.6 | 48.5% | 26.7% | 76.7% | 2.6 | 0.7 | 0.6 | 0.1 | 0.7 | 4.9 |
| Jaylyn Sherrod | 18 | 0 | 5.8 | 30.0% | 27.3% | 77.8% | 0.6 | 0.6 | 0.6 | 0.0 | 0.6 | 1.2 |
| Marquesha Davis | 9 | 0 | 3.4 | 25.0% | 0.0% | 100.0% | 0.6 | 0.1 | — | 0.1 | 0.3 | 0.9 |

=== Playoffs ===
| Player | GP | GS | MPG | FG% | 3P% | FT% | RPG | APG | SPG | BPG | TO | PPG |
|---|---|---|---|---|---|---|---|---|---|---|---|---|
| Sabrina Ionescu | 3 | 3 | 35.3 | 34.0% | 21.9% | 60.0% | 5.3 | 4.7 | 0.3 | 1.0 | 3.3 | 15.7 |
| Natasha Cloud | 3 | 3 | 34.3 | 56.5% | 50.0% | 85.7% | 3.7 | 3.0 | 2.7 | 0.3 | 3.0 | 12.7 |
| Breanna Stewart | 3 | 3 | 31.7 | 45.9% | 42.9% | 77.3% | 5.7 | 3.0 | 1.3 | 1.0 | 1.3 | 18.0 |
| Leonie Fiebich | 3 | 3 | 30.3 | 27.8% | 25.0% | 100.0% | 3.7 | 1.3 | 0.3 | 0.3 | 2.0 | 5.0 |
| Jonquel Jones | 3 | 3 | 30.0 | 26.9% | 18.2% | 50.0% | 11.0 | 2.3 | — | 2.0 | 1.3 | 5.7 |
| Kennedy Burke | 3 | 0 | 17.3 | 26.3% | 9.1% | 75.0% | 2.3 | 0.3 | 0.3 | 0.7 | 2.0 | 4.7 |
| Emma Meesseman | 3 | 0 | 13.3 | 27.8% | 0.0% | 50.0% | 5.3 | 2.0 | — | — | 1.7 | 4.3 |
| Marine Johannès | 1 | 0 | 10.0 | 0.0% | 0.0% | 100.0% | 2.0 | — | — | — | 1.0 | 3.0 |
| Stephanie Talbot | 1 | 0 | 9.0 | 0.0% | 0.0% | — | — | — | — | — | — | — |
| Isabelle Harrison | 1 | 0 | 7.0 | 100.0% | — | 0.0% | 2.0 | — | 2.0 | — | — | 4.0 |
| Nyara Sabally | 1 | 0 | 7.0 | 0.0% | — | 50.0% | 1.0 | 1.0 | 1.0 | — | — | 1.0 |
| Rebekah Gardner | 3 | 0 | 5.0 | 33.3% | 50.0% | — | 0.3 | — | — | — | — | 1.0 |

== Awards and honors ==
| Recipient | Award | Date awarded | Ref. |
|---|---|---|---|
| Sandy Brondello | Coach of the Month – May | June 4 | |
| Sandy Brondello | WNBA All-Star Head Coach | July 3 | |
| Natasha Cloud | Eastern Conference Player of the Week | May 28 | |
| Sabrina Ionescu | WNBA All-Star Starter | June 30 | |
| Sabrina Ionescu | Eastern Conference Player of the Week | July 15 | |
| Sabrina Ionescu | Eastern Conference Player of the Week | July 29 | |
| Sabrina Ionescu | Eastern Conference Player of the Month – July | August 4 | |
| Sabrina Ionescu | AP All-WNBA Second Team | September 12 | |
| Sabrina Ionescu | All-WNBA Second Team | October 10 | |
| Breanna Stewart | WNBA All-Star Starter | June 30 | |
| Breanna Stewart | WNBA All-Defensive Second Team | October 8 | |
