= 2024 New York Liberty season =

WNBA season

- WNBA champions
- Head coach: Sandy Brondello
- Arena: Barclays Center

Results
- Record: 32–8 (.800)
- Place: 1st (Eastern)
- Playoff finish: WNBA Champions (Defeated Minnesota Lynx 3–2 in WNBA Finals)

Media
- Television: WWOR-TV; WNYW

The 2024 New York Liberty season was the 28th season for the New York Liberty franchise of the WNBA, and their third season under head coach, Sandy Brondello. The season tipped off on Tuesday, May 14, 2024, against the Washington Mystics in Washington.

The Liberty started the season strongly, winning their first four games, including a dominant 102–66 win over Indiana. They slowed a little after that, losing two straight games, before winning their final two games in May. They finished the month 6–2. Their winning streak carried forward into June as they won six additional games to extend the streak to eight games. The streak included another blow-out win over Indiana and wins over Connecticut and Las Vegas. The streak also encompassed all their WNBA Commissioner's Cup regular season games. Their 5–0 Commissioner's Cup earned them a spot in the finals. Their winning streak was broken after eight games by Phoenix. After that, they won back-to-back games against Los Angeles and a game in Atlanta before the Commissioner's Cup Final. The Liberty came up short of winning back-to-back Commissioner's Cups as they lost the final to Minnesota 89–94. They won their final game in June to finish the month 10–1. They defeated Minnesota before losing to Indiana to begin July. They won their next four games before the Olympic break to finish July 5–1. They headed into the Olympic break with a WNBA best 21–4 record. The Liberty's stellar play carried through the Olympic break as they won their first four games back, including a back-to-back against Dallas. They lost two of their last four games, losing against Connecticut and Los Angeles to finish August 6–2. Their win on August 17 secured them a playoff berth. The Liberty entered September in a fight for the number one seed with Minnesota. The team won their first four games of the month before dropping two of their last three. The loss on September 15 to Minnesota ended up not being pivotal as the Liberty secured the number one seed with a win in their next game on September 17. They finished September 5–2. The Liberty's overall regular season record was 32–8, which matched their record from the previous season.

The Liberty entered the playoffs as the number one seed, and hosted the eighth-seeded Atlanta Dream in the First Round. The Liberty used home court advantage to sweep the Dream two games to zero, winning Game One 83–69 and Game Two 91–82. In the Semifinals the Liberty faced the fourth seed Las Vegas Aces. The Liberty won Games One and Two in New York 87–77 and 88–84. The Aces won Game Three in Las Vegas 95–81, but the Liberty took Game Four 76–62 to win the series three games to one. The Liberty faced Minnesota in a re-match of the Commissionier's Cup final in the WNBA Finals. New York lost Game One 93–95 in overtime. They bounced back to win Game Two 80–66. They won Game Three in Minnesota 80–77. They were unable to close out the Finals in Game Four, losing 80–82. The series returned to New York for Game 5, which the Liberty won, in overtime, 67–62. This was the first WNBA title for the Liberty, ending a streak of five Finals losses.

== Transactions ==
=== WNBA draft ===
Round	Pick	Player	Nationality	School/Team/Country
1	11	Marquesha Davis	United States	Ole Miss
2	17	Esmery Martinez	Dominican Republic	Arizona
2	23	Jessika Carter	United States	Mississippi State
3	35	Kaitlyn Davis	United States	USC

=== Transactions ===
Date	Transaction
January 11, 2024	Cored Breanna Stewart
January 11, 2024	Extended a Qualifying Offer to Marine Johannès
February 1, 2024	Signed Leonie Fiebich to a Rookie Contract
February 1, 2024	Signed Okako Adika to a Rookie Contract
February 1, 2024	Signed Stephanie Mawuli to a Training Camp Contract
February 1, 2024	Signed Ivana Dojkić to a Training Camp Contract
February 5, 2024	Signed Brianna Fraser to a Training Camp Contract
February 15, 2024	Signed Morgan Green to a Training Camp Contract
February 16, 2024	Re-signed Jonquel Jones
February 20, 2024	Signed Kennedy Burke
February 26, 2024	Re-signed Breanna Stewart
March 14, 2024	Acquired Rebekah Gardner in exchange for their 2025 and 2026 second round picks
March 18, 2024	Signed Ana Tadić to a Rookie Contract
April 16, 2024	Signed Jaylyn Sherrod to a Rookie Contract
April 17, 2024	Waived Morgan Green
April 17, 2024	Signed Rita Igbokwe to a Training Camp Contract
April 17, 2024	Signed Marquesha Davis, Esmery Martinez, and Jessika Carter to Rookie Contracts
April 23, 2024	Epiphanny Prince announced her retirement from the WNBA
April 25, 2024	Waived Ana Tadić
May 11, 2024	Waived Stephanie Mawuli, Rita Igbokwe, Brianna Fraser, Jessika Carter, and Okako Adika
May 13, 2024	Waived Esmery Martinez and Jaylyn Sherrod
July 6, 2024	Signed Jaylyn Sherrod to a 7-day contract
July 13, 2024	Signed Jaylyn Sherrod to a second 7-day contract
August 17, 2024	Signed Jaylyn Sherrod to a third 7-day contract
August 24, 2024	Signed Jaylyn Sherrod to a rest of season contract

=== Roster changes ===
==== Additions ====
Personnel	Signed/Traded	Former team
Kennedy Burke	Signed	Washington Mystics
Marquesha Davis	Draft	Ole Miss
Ivana Dojkić	Signed	Seattle Storm
Leonie Fiebich	Signed	—
Rebekah Gardner	Trade	Chicago Sky

==== Subtractions ====
Personnel	Reason	New team
Stefanie Dolson	Free Agency	Washington Mystics
Marine Johannès	Unsigned, rights retained	—
Epiphanny Prince	Retired	
Jocelyn Willoughby	Free Agency	—
Han Xu	Suspended	—

== Roster ==
2024 New York Liberty roster
Players
Coaches

Pos.	No.	Nat.	Name	Height	Weight	DOB	From	Yrs
G/F	2	(United States)	Burke, Kennedy	6' 1" (1.85m)	182 lb (83kg)	1997-02-14	UCLA	4
G	1	(United States)	Davis, Marquesha	6' 0" (1.83m)		2001-05-29	Mississippi	R
G	18	(Croatia)	Dojkić, Ivana	5' 11" (1.8m)	154 lb (70kg)	1997-12-24	Croatia	1
F	13	(Germany)	Fiebich, Leonie	6' 4" (1.93m)		2000-01-10	Germany	R
G	20	(United States)	Ionescu, Sabrina	5' 11" (1.8m)	165 lb (75kg)	1997-12-06	Oregon	4
C	35	(Bosnia and Herzegovina)	Jones, Jonquel	6' 6" (1.98m)	215 lb (98kg)	1994-01-05	George Washington	7
G/F	44	(United States)	Laney-Hamilton, Betnijah	6' 0" (1.83m)	166 lb (75kg)	1993-10-29	Rutgers	8
C	8	(Germany)	Sabally, Nyara	6' 5" (1.96m)	204 lb (93kg)	2000-02-26	Oregon	1
G	0	(United States)	Sherrod, Jaylyn	5' 7" (1.7m)		2001-10-21	Colorado	R
F	30	(United States)	Stewart, Breanna	6' 4" (1.93m)	170 lb (77kg)	1994-08-27	Connecticut	7
F	5	(United States)	Thornton, Kayla	6' 1" (1.85m)	188 lb (85kg)	1992-10-20	UTEP	8
G	22	(Hungary)	Vandersloot, Courtney	5' 8" (1.73m)	137 lb (62kg)	1989-02-08	Gonzaga	13

Head coach
(Australia) Sandy Brondello (Western Sydney)
Assistant coaches
(Germany) Olaf Lange
(United States) Roneeka Hodges (Florida State)
(United States) Zach O'Brien (Saint Joseph's College of Maine)
Athletic trainer
(United States) Terri Acosta
Strength and conditioning coach
(United States) Emily Zaler

Legend

- (C) Team captain
- (DP) Unsigned draft pick
- (FA) Free agent
- (S) Suspended
- Injured

=== Depth ===
Pos.	Starter	Bench
PG	Courtney Vandersloot	Ivana Dojkić; Jaylyn Sherrod
SG	Sabrina Ionescu	Kennedy Burke; Marquesha Davis
SF	Betnijah Laney-Hamilton	Kayla Thornton
PF	Breanna Stewart	Leonie Fiebich
C	Jonquel Jones	Nyara Sabally

== Schedule ==
=== Pre-season ===
2023 pre-season game log
Total: 1–1 (Home: 0–0; Road: 1–1)
May: 1–1 (Home: 0–0; Road: 1–1)

Game	Date	Team	Score	High points	High rebounds	High assists	Location Attendance	Record
1	May 7	@ Chicago	L 52–101	Sabrina Ionescu (8)	Jones, Thornton (5)	Carter, Ionescu, Jones, Martínez (2)	Wintrust Arena; 3,132	0–1
2	May 9	@ Connecticut	W 82–79	Sabrina Ionescu (15)	Breanna Stewart (7)	Breanna Stewart (4)	Mohegan Sun Arena; 5,617	1–1

2024 pre-season schedule

=== Regular season ===
2024 game log
Total: 32–8 (Home: 16–4; Road: 16–4)
May: 6–2 (Home: 4–1; Road: 2–1)

Game	Date	Team	Score	High points	High rebounds	High assists	Location Attendance	Record
1	May 14	@ Washington	W 85-80	Jonquel Jones (25)	Jones, Stewart (8)	Sabrina Ionescu (8)	Entertainment and Sports Arena; 4,200	1–0
2	May 16	@ Indiana	W 102–66	Breanna Stewart (31)	Jones, Stewart (10)	Courtney Vandersloot (6)	Gainbridge Fieldhouse; 17,274	2–0
3	May 18	Indiana	W 91–80	Breanna Stewart (24)	Jonquel Jones (12)	Ionescu, Jones, Vandersloot (5)	Barclays Center; 17,735	3–0
4	May 20	Seattle	W 74–63	Sabrina Ionescu (20)	Breanna Stewart (11)	Sabrina Ionescu (8)	Barclays Center; 9,381	4–0
5	May 23	Chicago	L 81–90	Sabrina Ionescu (19)	Breanna Stewart (10)	Courtney Vandersloot (7)	Barclays Center; 12,049	4–1
6	May 25	@ Minnesota	L 67–84	Breanna Stewart (20)	Breanna Stewart (11)	Courtney Vandersloot (6)	Target Center; 7,010	4–2
7	May 29	Phoenix	W 81–78	Sabrina Ionescu (22)	Breanna Stewart (8)	Sabrina Ionescu (9)	Barclays Center; 9,182	5–2
8	May 31	Washington	W 90–79	Kayla Thornton (20)	Breanna Stewart (15)	Breanna Stewart (5)	Barclays Center; 9,878	6–2

June : 10–1 (Home: 5–0; Road: 5–1)

Game	Date	Team	Score	High points	High rebounds	High assists	Location Attendance	Record
9	June 2	Indiana	W 104–68	Betnijah Laney-Hamilton (20)	Jonquel Jones (13)	Courtney Vandersloot (7)	Barclays Center; 17,401	7–2 (1–0 Commissioner's Cup)
10	June 4	@ Chicago	W 88–75	Breanna Stewart (33)	Breanna Stewart (14)	Courtney Vandersloot (6)	Wintrust Arena; 8,277	8–2 (2–0 Commissioner's Cup)
11	June 6	@ Atlanta	W 78–61	Breanna Stewart (25)	Breanna Stewart (10)	Fiebich, Ionescu, Stewart (5)	Gateway Center Arena; 3,255	9–2 (3–0 Commissioner's Cup)
12	June 8	@ Connecticut	W 82–75	Sabrina Ionescu (24)	Jonquel Jones (8)	Betnijah Laney-Hamilton (6)	Mohegan Sun Arena; 8,910	10–2 (4–0 Commissioner's Cup)
13	June 9	Washington	W 93–88	Jonquel Jones (29)	Betnijah Laney-Hamilton (10)	Sabrina Ionescu (8)	Barclays Center; 12,477	11–2 (5–0 Commissioner's Cup)
14	June 15	@ Las Vegas	W 90–82	Jonquel Jones (34)	Breanna Stewart (12)	Sabrina Ionescu (12)	Michelob Ultra Arena; 10,424	12–2
15	June 18	@ Phoenix	L 93–99	Breanna Stewart (28)	Betnijah Laney-Hamilton (9)	Sabrina Ionescu (8)	Footprint Center; 9,824	12–3
16	June 20	Los Angeles	W 93–80	Sabrina Ionescu (31)	Leonie Fiebich (9)	Sabrina Ionescu (9)	Barclays Center; 10,955	13–3
17	June 22	Los Angeles	W 98–88	Breanna Stewart (33)	Jonquel Jones (13)	Sabrina Ionescu (9)	Barclays Center; 13,639	14–3
18	June 23	@ Atlanta	W 96–75	Sabrina Ionescu (26)	Jonquel Jones (11)	Sabrina Ionescu (11)	Gateway Center Arena; 3,260	15–3
Commissioner's; Cup Final	June 25	Minnesota	L 89–94	Breanna Stewart (24)	Jonquel Jones (12)	Betnijah Laney-Hamilton (6)	UBS Arena; 7,015	—
19	June 30	Atlanta	W 81–75	Breanna Stewart (22)	Breanna Stewart (12)	Courtney Vandersloot (7)	Barclays Center; 10,823	16–3

July : 5–1 (Home: 3–0; Road: 2–1)

Game	Date	Team	Score	High points	High rebounds	High assists	Location Attendance	Record
20	July 2	Minnesota	W 76–67	Jonquel Jones (21)	Breanna Stewart (17)	Sabrina Ionescu (5)	Barclays Center; 10,846	17–3
21	July 6	@ Indiana	L 78–83	Sabrina Ionescu (22)	Jonquel Jones (12)	Breanna Stewart (6)	Gainbridge Fieldhouse; 17,274	17–4
22	July 10	@ Connecticut	W 71–68	Sabrina Ionescu (21)	Breanna Stewart (14)	Fiebich, Ionescu (5)	Mohegan Sun Arena; 8,910	18–4
23	July 11	Chicago	W 91–76	Sabrina Ionescu (21)	Jonquel Jones (13)	Stewart, Vandersloot (6)	Barclays Center; 17,758	19–4
24	July 13	@ Chicago	W 81–67	Sabrina Ionescu (28)	Jonquel Jones (9)	Jonquel Jones (7)	Wintrust Arena; 9,025	20–4
25	July 16	Connecticut	W 82–74	Sabrina Ionescu (30)	Jonquel Jones (7)	Ionescu, Jones (5)	Barclays Center; 13,694	21–4

August : 6–2 (Home: 2–1; Road: 4–1)

Game	Date	Team	Score	High points	High rebounds	High assists	Location Attendance	Record
26	August 15	@ Los Angeles	W 103–68	Breanna Stewart (27)	Nyara Sabally (9)	Sabrina Ionescu (6)	Crypto.com Arena; 11,120	22–4
27	August 17	@ Las Vegas	W 79–67	Sabrina Ionescu (23)	Jonquel Jones (17)	Jonquel Jones (7)	Michelob Ultra Arena; 10,397	23–4
28	August 20	Dallas	W 94–74	Breanna Stewart (26)	Jones, Stewart (12)	Courtney Vandersloot (11)	Barclays Center; 11,455	24–4
29	August 22	Dallas	W 79–71	Breanna Stewart (19)	Jonquel Jones (13)	Stewart, Vandersloot (6)	Barclays Center; 10,986	25–4
30	August 24	Connecticut	L 64–72	Breanna Stewart (15)	Breanna Stewart (15)	Courtney Vandersloot (5)	Barclays Center; 13,098	25–5
31	August 26	@ Phoenix	W 84–70	Breanna Stewart (21)	Jonquel Jones (7)	Breanna Stewart (6)	Footprint Center; 10,299	26–5
32	August 28	@ Los Angeles	L 88–94	Breanna Stewart (32)	Nyara Sabally (10)	Courtney Vandersloot (13)	Crypto.com Arena; 10,403	26–6
33	August 30	@ Seattle	W 98–85	Breanna Stewart (32)	Jonquel Jones (11)	Sabrina Ionescu (8)	Climate Pledge Arena; 15,800	27–6

September : 5–2 (Home: 2–2; Road: 3–0)

Game	Date	Team	Score	High points	High rebounds	High assists	Location Attendance	Record
34	September 5	Seattle	W 77–70	Betnijah Laney-Hamilton (18)	Jonquel Jones (8)	Sabrina Ionescu (8)	Barclays Center; 10,873	28–6
35	September 8	Las Vegas	W 75–71	Breanna Stewart (21)	Breanna Stewart (11)	4 players (4)	Barclays Center; 15,393	29–6
36	September 10	@ Dallas	W 105–91	Breanna Stewart (27)	Nyara Sabally (7)	Sabrina Ionescu (11)	College Park Center; 5,157	30–6
37	September 12	@ Dallas	W 99–67	Sabrina Ionescu (20)	Jonquel Jones (7)	Sabrina Ionescu (6)	College Park Center; 5,384	31–6
38	September 15	Minnesota	L 79–88	Breanna Stewart (38)	Breanna Stewart (18)	Sabrina Ionescu (8)	Barclays Center; 14,246	31–7
39	September 17	@ Washington	W 87–71	Breanna Stewart (15)	Breanna Stewart (10)	Sabrina Ionescu (7)	Entertainment and Sports Arena; 4,200	32–7
40	September 19	Atlanta	L 67–78	Breanna Stewart (16)	Jonquel Jones (10)	Sabrina Ionescu (7)	Barclays Center; 12,721	32–8

2024 season schedule

=== Playoffs ===
2024 playoff game log
First round vs. Atlanta Dream
Won Series: 2–0

Game	Date	Team	Score	High points	High rebounds	High assists	Location Attendance	Series
1	September 22	Atlanta	W 83–69	Leonie Fiebich (21)	Breanna Stewart (11)	Laney-Hamilton, Ionescu (5)	Barclays Center; 12,115	1–0
2	September 24	Atlanta	W 91–82	Sabrina Ionescu (36)	Jonquel Jones (13)	Sabrina Ionescu (6)	Barclays Center; 11,003	2–0

Semifinals vs. Las Vegas Aces
Won Series: 3–1

Game	Date	Team	Score	High points	High rebounds	High assists	Location Attendance	Series
1	September 30	Las Vegas	W 87–77	Breanna Stewart (34)	Jonquel Jones (12)	Sabrina Ionescu (5)	Barclays Center; 14,015	1–0
2	October 1	Las Vegas	W 88–84	Sabrina Ionescu (24)	Sabrina Ionescu (9)	Breanna Stewart (8)	Barclays Center; 14,321	2–0
3	October 4	@ Las Vegas	L 81–95	Breanna Stewart (19)	Jones, Stewart (6)	Ionescu, Vandersloot (5)	Michelob Ultra Arena; 10,369	2–1
4	October 6	@ Las Vegas	W 76–62	Sabrina Ionescu (22)	Breanna Stewart (14)	Breanna Stewart (5)	Michelob Ultra Arena; 10,374	3–1

Finals vs. Minnesota Lynx
Won Series: 3–2

Game	Date	Team	Score	High points	High rebounds	High assists	Location Attendance	Series
1	October 10	Minnesota	L 93–95 (OT)	Jonquel Jones (24)	Jonquel Jones (10)	Fiebich, Laney-Hamilton, Vandersloot (4)	Barclays Center; 17,732	0–1
2	October 13	Minnesota	W 80–66	Breanna Stewart (21)	Jonquel Jones (9)	Ionescu, Stewart (5)	Barclays Center; 18,046	1–1
3	October 16	@ Minnesota	W 80–77	Breanna Stewart (30)	Breanna Stewart (11)	Sabrina Ionescu (6)	Target Center; 19,521	2–1
4	October 18	@ Minnesota	L 80–82	Jonquel Jones (21)	Breanna Stewart (11)	Fiebich, Ionescu (5)	Target Center; 19,210	2–2
5	October 20	Minnesota	W 67–62 (OT)	Jonquel Jones (17)	Breanna Stewart (15)	Sabrina Ionescu (8)	Barclays Center; 18,090	3–2

2024 playoff schedule

== Standings ==
#	Team	W	L	PCT	GB	Conf.	Home	Road	Cup
1	yx – New York Liberty	32	8	.800	—	16–4	16–4	16–4	5–0
2	cx – Minnesota Lynx	30	10	.750	2	14–6	16–4	14–6	4–1
3	x – Connecticut Sun	28	12	.700	4	14–6	14–6	14–6	4–1
4	x – Las Vegas Aces	27	13	.675	5	12–8	13–7	14–6	2–3
5	x – Seattle Storm	25	15	.625	7	13–7	14–6	11–9	4–1
6	x – Indiana Fever	20	20	.500	12	11–9	12–8	8–12	3–2
7	x – Phoenix Mercury	19	21	.475	13	10–10	10–10	9–11	3–2
8	x – Atlanta Dream	15	25	.375	17	7–13	8–12	7–13	1–4
9	e – Washington Mystics	14	26	.350	18	7–13	5–15	9–11	1–4
10	e – Chicago Sky	13	27	.325	19	5–15	6–14	7–13	1–4
11	e – Dallas Wings	9	31	.225	23	6–14	7–13	2–18	0–5
12	e – Los Angeles Sparks	8	32	.200	24	5–15	5–15	3–17	2–3

Notes

(#) – League Standing
c – Commissioner's Cup winners
y – Regular Season Champion
x – Clinched playoff berth
e – Eliminated from playoff contention
Source: Overall standings and Commissioner's Cup Standings

== Playoffs ==
**First round** Best-of-3
**1**	**New York Liberty**	**2**
8	Atlanta Dream	0
**4**	**Las Vegas Aces**	**2**
5	Seattle Storm	0
2	**Minnesota Lynx**	**2**
7	Phoenix Mercury	0
3	**Connecticut Sun**	**2**
6	Indiana Fever	0

**Semifinals**; Best-of-5
1	**New York Liberty**	**3**
4	Las Vegas Aces	1
2	**Minnesota Lynx**	**3**
3	Connecticut Sun	2

**Finals**; Best-of-5
1	**New York Liberty**	**3**
2	Minnesota Lynx	2

- **Bold** – Series winner
- Italic – Team with home-court-advantage

== Statistics ==
Legend
GP	Games played	GS	Games started	MPG	Minutes per game	RPG	Rebounds per game
APG	Assists per game	SPG	Steals per game	BPG	Blocks per game	PPG	Points per game
FG%	Field-goal percentage	3P%	3-point field-goal percentage	FT%	Free-throw percentage	TO	Turnovers per game
PF	Fouls per game		Team leader		League leader

=== Regular season ===
Player	GP	GS	MPG	FG%	3P%	FT%	RPG	APG	SPG	BPG	TO	PF	PPG
Breanna Stewart	38	38	32.7	.458	.295	.845	8.5	3.5	1.7	1.3	1.7	2.1	20.4
Sabrina Ionescu	38	38	32.1	.394	.332	.898	4.4	6.2	1.0	0.3	2.7	1.2	18.2
Jonquel Jones	39	39	29.8	.539	.391	.788	9.0	3.2	0.8	1.3	2.4	2.9	14.2
Betnijah Laney-Hamilton	28	25	30.3	.456	.402	.906	4.2	3.3	1.1	0.0	2.4	2.1	11.8
Leonie Fiebich	40	15	20.9	.478	.433	.720	3.0	1.8	1.0	0.2	1.0	2.2	6.7
Courtney Vandersloot	31	31	22.3	.445	.269	.548	2.6	4.8	0.8	0.5	1.8	1.7	6.4
Kayla Thornton	40	11	20.3	.379	.357	.846	2.6	0.7	0.7	0.2	0.6	1.4	5.5
Nyara Sabally	26	0	13.5	.575	.000	.700	4.0	0.6	0.9	0.7	0.5	1.6	4.9
Kennedy Burke	38	3	12.1	.409	.259	.667	1.5	0.9	0.6	0.3	0.7	1.0	3.4
Ivana Dojkić	26	0	9.9	.338	.381	.778	0.8	0.8	0.3	0.0	0.5	1.0	3.3
Jaylyn Sherrod ^{≠}	10	0	3.7	.500	.333	.500	0.3	0.5	0.3	0.1	0.2	0.4	1.9
Marquesha Davis	20	0	4.0	.409	1.000	.714	0.5	0.2	0.1	0.2	0.2	0.6	1.2

^{‡}Waived/Released during the season
^{†}Traded during the season
^{≠}Acquired during the season

=== Playoffs ===
Player	GP	GS	MPG	FG%	3P%	FT%	RPG	APG	SPG	BPG	TO	PF	PPG
Breanna Stewart	11	11	37.4	.382	.261	.817	9.4	3.6	1.6	1.7	2.4	1.8	19.4
Sabrina Ionescu	11	11	35.5	.396	.363	.920	5.3	5.3	1.6	0.5	2.9	1.9	16.9
Jonquel Jones	11	11	32.5	.550	.448	.946	8.2	2.2	0.7	0.6	2.8	2.8	15.5
Leonie Fiebich	11	11	31.0	.542	.521	1.000	3.8	2.4	0.8	0.0	0.7	2.4	11.6
Betnijah Laney-Hamilton	11	11	27.3	.369	.294	1.000	2.9	2.5	1.1	0.2	1.5	1.7	7.0
Courtney Vandersloot	11	0	14.3	.435	.385	.929	2.4	2.5	0.5	0.5	1.0	1.1	5.3
Nyara Sabally	9	0	10.1	.542	—	.875	3.4	0.0	0.7	0.7	1.7	1.9	4.4
Marquesha Davis	1	0	3.0	.500	1.000	—	2.0	2.0	0.0	0.0	0.0	0.0	3.0
Kayla Thornton	11	0	12.5	.333	.176	1.000	1.5	0.1	0.3	0.3	0.1	1.5	2.0
Ivana Dojkić	2	0	4.0	.500	1.000	—	0.0	0.0	0.0	0.0	0.0	0.0	1.5
Kennedy Burke	6	0	7.5	.182	.167	.250	1.7	0.5	0.2	0.2	0.3	0.8	1.0
Jaylyn Sherrod	2	0	3.0	.000	.000	—	0.5	0.5	0.5	0.0	0.0	0.5	0.0

== Awards and honors ==
Recipient	Award	Date awarded	Ref.
Sandy Brondello	WNBA Coach of the Month – July	July 19, 2024	
Leonie Fiebich	AP All-Rookie Team	September 22, 2024	
Leonie Fiebich	WNBA All-Rookie Team	October 3, 2024	
Sabrina Ionescu	Eastern Conference Player of the Week	June 4, 2024	
Sabrina Ionescu	Eastern Conference Player of the Week	June 25, 2024	
Sabrina Ionescu	Eastern Conference Player of the Week	July 18, 2024	
Sabrina Ionescu	Eastern Conference Player of the Month – June	July 2, 2024	
Sabrina Ionescu	WNBA All-Star	July 2, 2024	
Sabrina Ionescu	Eastern Conference Player of the Month – July	July 19, 2024	
Sabrina Ionescu	AP All-WNBA Second Team	September 22, 2024	
Sabrina Ionescu	All-WNBA Second Team	October 16, 2024	
Jonquel Jones	WNBA All-Star	July 2, 2024	
Jonquel Jones	WNBA All-Defensive Second Team	September 29, 2024	
Jonquel Jones	All-WNBA Second Team	October 16, 2024	
Jonquel Jones	WNBA Finals MVP	October 20, 2024	
Breanna Stewart	Eastern Conference Player of the Week	June 11, 2024	
Breanna Stewart	Eastern Conference Player of the Week	September 20, 2024	
Breanna Stewart	WNBA All-Star	July 2, 2024	
Breanna Stewart	Eastern Conference Player of the Month – September	September 20, 2024	
Breanna Stewart	AP All-WNBA First Team	September 22, 2024	
Breanna Stewart	WNBA All-Defensive First Team	September 29, 2024	
Breanna Stewart	All-WNBA First Team	October 16, 2024	
