= Lorela Cubaj =

Italian basketball player (born 1999)

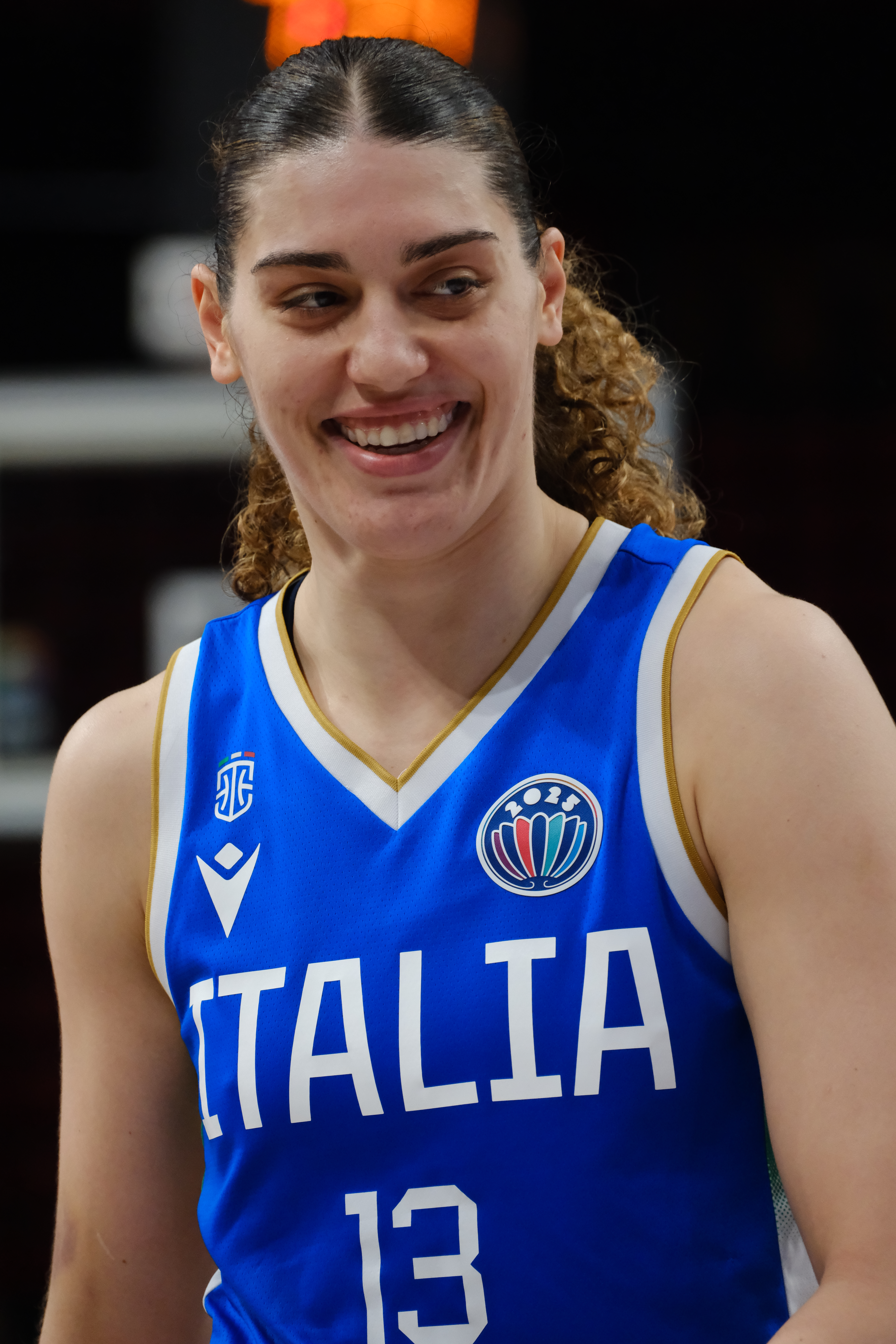
- Cubaj with Italy at the EuroBasket Women 2025

No. 13 – Umana Reyer Venezia
- Position: Forward
- League: WNBA; Lega Basket Femminile

Personal information
- Born: January 8, 1999 (age 27) Terni, Italy
- Listed height: 6 ft 4 in (1.93 m)
- Listed weight: 200 lb (91 kg)

Career information
- High school: Istituto Paritario Giuseppe Parini (Mestre, Italy)
- College: Georgia Tech (2017–2022)
- WNBA draft: 2022: 2nd round, 18th overall pick
- Drafted by: Seattle Storm
- Playing career: 2015–present

Career history
- 2015–2017: Umana Reyer Venezia
- 2022: New York Liberty
- 2022–present: Umana Reyer Venezia
- 2023–2025: Atlanta Dream

Career highlights
- Lega Basket Femminile champion (2024); 2× ACC Defensive Player of the Year (2021, 2022); 2x ACC All-Defensive Team (2021, 2022); 2× First-team All-ACC (2021, 2022)
- Stats at Basketball Reference
Medals
Women's Basketball
Representing Italy
EuroBasket
Bronze medal – third place	2025 Greece
U17 World Championship
Silver medal – second place	2016 Spain
U16 European Championship
Bronze medal – third place	2015 Portugal

Lorela Cubaj (born January 8, 1999) is an Italian professional basketball player for the Atlanta Dream of the Women's National Basketball Association (WNBA) and for Umana Reyer Venezia of the Lega Basket Femminile. She played college basketball at Georgia Tech. She was drafted by the Seattle Storm in the 2022 WNBA draft and played for the New York Liberty in the WNBA. She was waived by the team during her rookie season on July 1, 2022 after playing 11 games.

== Playing career ==
=== Early years ===
Cubaj started playing basketball when she was 8. She won the Italian U18 championship with Umana Reyer Venezia in the 2016–17 season.

=== College career ===
Cubaj signed with Georgia Tech the summer of 2017. She made the NCAA Tournament Sweet Sixteen with the Yellow Jackets in 2021, where they were defeated by South Carolina. That match Cubaj scored 15 points and grabbed 7 rebounds.

=== Professional career ===
On April 11, 2022, Cubaj was drafted 18th overall by the Seattle Storm in the 2022 WNBA draft and they traded her draft rights to New York immediately. Cubaj played in 11 games for the Liberty during her rookie season before being waived on July 1, 2022. On 15 June 2022 Cubaj was signed to Umana Reyer Venezia for the 2022–23 LBF season.

== Career statistics ==
Legend
GP	Games played	GS	Games started	MPG	Minutes per game	RPG	Rebounds per game
APG	Assists per game	SPG	Steals per game	BPG	Blocks per game	PPG	Points per game
TO	Turnovers per game	FG%	Field-goal percentage	3P%	3-point field-goal percentage	FT%	Free-throw percentage
**Bold**	Career best	°	League leader

=== WNBA ===
==== Regular season ====
Stats current through end of 2024 season

WNBA regular season statistics
Year	Team	GP	GS	MPG	FG%	3P%	FT%	RPG	APG	SPG	BPG	TO	PPG
2022	New York	11	0	**8.0**	.333	—	—	2.1	0.4	0.0	0.2	0.5	0.7
2023	Atlanta	3	0	6.3	.000	—	—	**2.3**	0.0	0.0	**0.3**	**0.3**	0.0
2024	Atlanta	**28**	**1**	7.9	**.429**	—	**.600**	1.5	**0.5**	**0.3**	0.1	0.4	**1.2**
**Career**	3 years, 2 teams	42	1	7.8	.396	—	.600	1.7	0.5	0.2	0.1	0.4	1.0

==== Playoffs ====
WNBA playoff statistics
Year	Team	GP	GS	MPG	FG%	3P%	FT%	RPG	APG	SPG	BPG	TO	PPG
2024	Atlanta	2	0	11.0	.500	—	—	2.5	0.5	0.5	0.0	0.0	1.0
**Career**	1 year, 1 team	2	0	11.0	.500	—	—	2.5	0.5	0.5	0.0	0.0	1.0

=== College ===
NCAA statistics
Year	Team	GP	GS	MPG	FG%	3P%	FT%	RPG	APG	SPG	BPG	TO	PPG
2017–18	Georgia Tech	**34**	**32**	20.6	32.9	16.7	46.2	4.4	1.5	1.4	0.8	**1.5**	3.7
2018–19	Georgia Tech	30	29	28.3	40.9	25.0	50.0	7.3	2.0	**1.5**	1.0	2.3	7.0
2019–20	Georgia Tech	31	30	**34.2**	**44.9**	**28.0**	57.8	7.7	2.5	1.2	1.2	1.9	10.0
2020–21	Georgia Tech	26	26	33.3	43.9	19.4	59.2	**11.5**	2.8	1.3	**1.3**	2.3	**12.5**
2021–22	Georgia Tech	32	**32**	33.6	42.0	17.4	**67.0**	11.1	**4.3**	1.4	**1.3**	2.1	10.0
**Career**		153	149	29.7	41.7	21.3	58.4	8.3	2.6	1.3	1.1	2.0	8.5

== National team ==
=== Youth level ===
Cubaj won the bronze medal with the Italian team at the U16 European Championship in 2015, averaging 11 points and 6.6 rebounds and being voted to the tournament All-Star Five. One year later she won the silver medal with the Italian U17 team, at the 2016 U17 World Championship in Spain. They lost the final against Australia. At the tournament Cubaj averaged 6.1 points and 5.4 rebounds. A few weeks later, she was part of the Italian U18 national team at the U18 European Championship in Hungary and finished seventh place. At the tournament Cubaj averaged 10.4 points and 7.3 rebounds.
