= Jaylyn Sherrod =

American basketball player (born 2001)

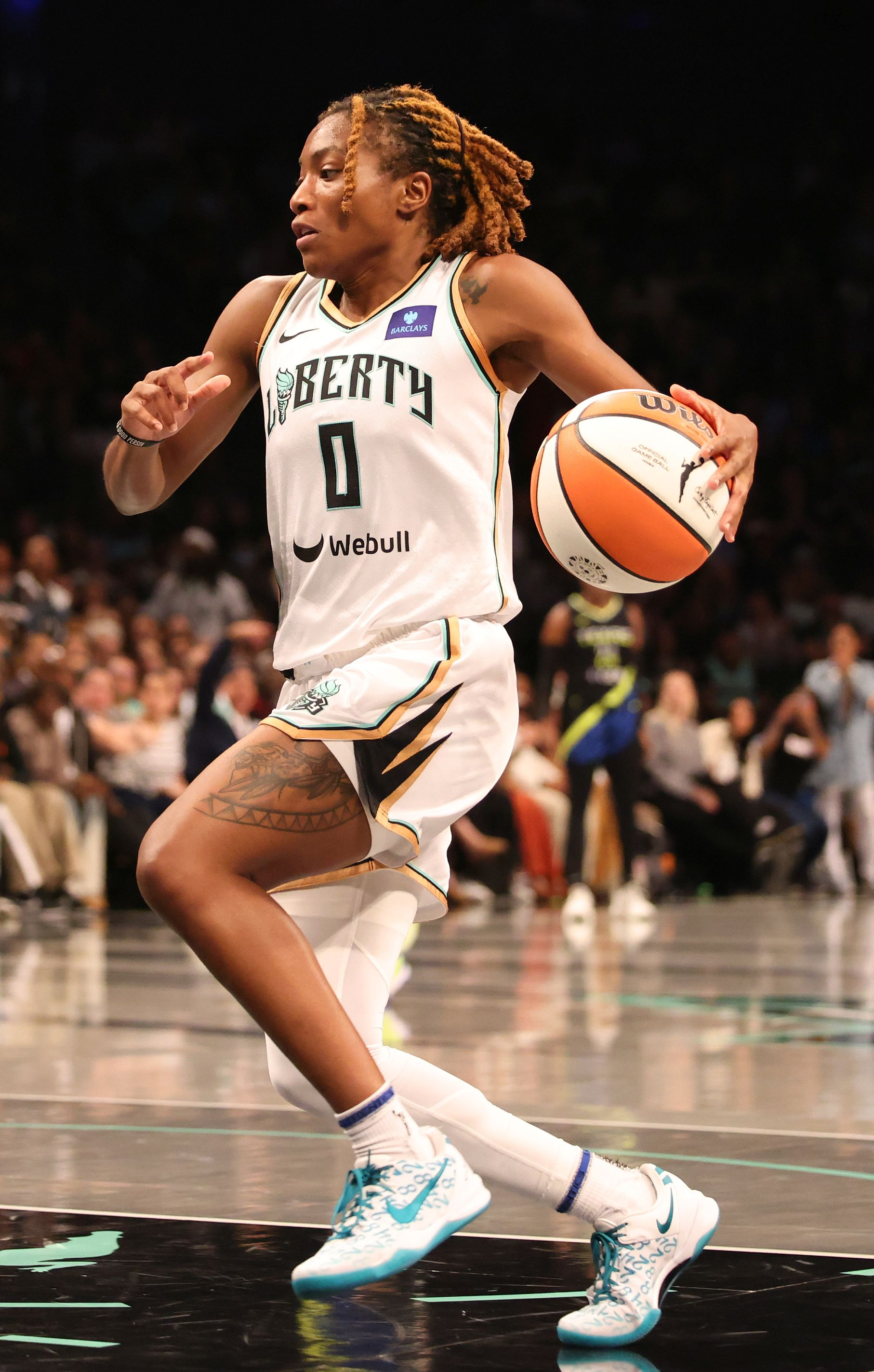
- Sherrod with the New York Liberty in 2024

Seattle Storm
- Position: Point guard
- League: WNBA

Personal information
- Born: October 21, 2001 (age 24) Birmingham, Alabama, U.S.
- Listed height: 5 ft 7 in (1.70 m)
- Listed weight: 147 lb (67 kg)

Career information
- High school: Ramsay (Birmingham, Alabama)
- College: Colorado (2019–2024)
- WNBA draft: 2024: undrafted
- Playing career: 2024–present

Career history
- 2024–2025: New York Liberty
- 2025-2026: Minnesota Lynx
- 2026: Atlanta Dream
- 2026–present: Seattle Storm

Career highlights
- WNBA champion (2024); 2x All Pac-12 (2023, 2024); 3x Pac-12 All-Defensive Team (2021, 2023, 2024); Pac-12 All-Freshman Team (2020)
- Stats at Basketball Reference

Jaylyn Sherrod (born October 21, 2001) is an American professional basketball player for the Seattle Storm of the Women's National Basketball Association (WNBA). She played college basketball for the Colorado Buffaloes.

== Early life ==
Sherrod was born on October 21, 2001, in Birmingham, Alabama. An only child, she played basketball when young with neighbors. After her mother saw her talent in the sport, she signed Sherrod up for a local league, and later signed her up for the Amateur Athletic Union (AAU). She continued her basketball career at Ramsay High School in Birmingham, where she was a two-time All-Area selection, a first-team All-Birmingham performer and the 2018 Birmingham Defensive Player of the Year.

Sherrod lettered three years at Ramsay and averaged 11.0 points, 4.0 assists and 3.8 steals per game as a junior; she missed the much of her senior season. In addition to playing, Sherrod was also a top student, being a member of the National Honor Society, a three-time honor roll student, and having a grade-point average (GPA) of over 4.0. She committed to play college basketball for the Colorado Buffaloes, the only Power Five team to extend an offer.

== College career ==
Colorado was last in the Pac-12 Conference the year before Sherrod enrolled, but she helped lead a major turnaround of the program. The team had won two games in 2018–19, and improved to five in Sherrod's freshman year, with her playing 30 games that season, being second on the team with 9.9 points per game and being chosen to the Pac-12 All-Freshman team. As a sophomore, she only played 12 games, averaging 10.4 points, missing most of the year due to a hip injury that required surgery.

In 2021–22, Sherrod led the Buffaloes to their first NCAA Tournament since 2013, starting all 31 games while averaging 8.1 points and 3.8 assists and being third in the Pac-12 in steals (55). The following year, she helped Colorado to the Sweet Sixteen of the NCAA Tournament before a narrow loss to Iowa, the program's best finish in 20 years. She was named to the Pac-12 All-Defensive team and All-Pac-12 for her performance, which included averaging 11.3 points in 33 games and leading the conference in assists per game. She also was first in the conference in steals and placed 31st nationally in that category.

Sherrod opted to return for a final season in 2023–24, as all players were given an extra year of eligibility due to the COVID-19 pandemic. She was a key player for the 2023–24 team that had their best start since 1992–93 and reached a ranking of No. 3 nationally. They made their second-straight Sweet Sixteen appearance before a loss to Iowa, with Sherrod ending her career as one of Colorado's "all-time greats". She averaged a career-high 12.8 points per game and was named first-team All-Pac-12 and to the Pac-12 All-Defensive team; she also broke the Colorado record for NCAA Tournament assists in her last game. She ended second in team history with 645 career assists, fifth with 274 steals, and 14th with 1,483 points scored. She played a total of 140 games which placed second in program history, and her 133 starts set a record. She also placed third in Colorado history in average assists (4.61) and average steals (1.96).

Sherrod was also a top student at Colorado, having a GPA of 3.82 and being a three-time member of the Pac-12 honor roll. She graduated with three degrees from Colorado, including a bachelor's degree in sociology and master's degrees in criminology and organizational leadership. She won the 2022 Byron R. White Leadership and Initiative Award for those "who have exhibited outstanding initiative and demonstrated a strong commitment to service to the CU and Boulder communities" and was named to the 2023 College Sports Communicators Academic All-District team. In her final year at Colorado, she was the Pac-12 women's basketball scholar-athlete of the year.

Sherrod declared for the 2024 WNBA draft.

== Professional career ==
=== WNBA ===
==== New York Liberty (2024–2025) ====
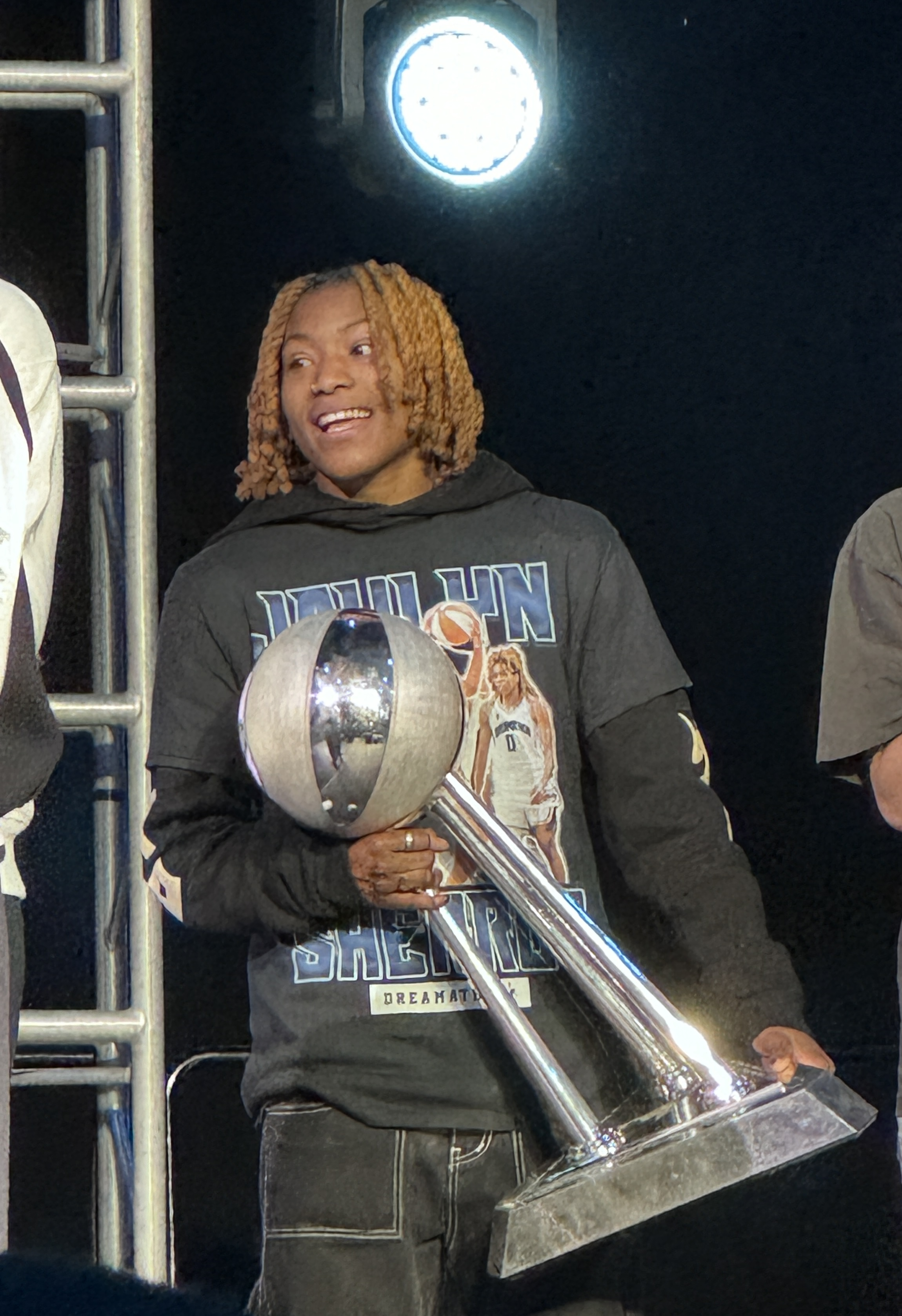
Jaylyn Sherrod with the 2024 WNBA Championship Trophy

After going unselected in the 2024 WNBA draft, Sherrod signed a training camp contract with the New York Liberty. She was a standout in training camp and preseason, averaging 6.0 points and recording four steals in two preseason games, but ultimately was waived on May 13, 2024. She returned to the team on July 6, signing a 7-day contract. She made her WNBA debut on July 11 against the Chicago Sky, recording no statistics in one minute of playing time. She signed another 7-day contract on July 13 and a third on August 17. The Liberty signed Sherrod to an end-of-season contract on August 26. The Liberty went on to win the 2024 WNBA championship.

Sherrod made the Liberty's roster for the 2025 season. However, on August 1, she was waived to make room for Emma Meesseman.

==== Minnesota Lynx (2025–2026) ====
On August 9, 2025, Sherrod signed with the Minnesota Lynx. On May 6, 2026, she was waived by the Lynx prior to the start of the 2026 season.

==== Atlanta Dream (2026-present) ====
On June 29, 2026, Sherrod signed a player development contract with the Atlanta Dream.

== Career statistics ==
Legend
GP	Games played	GS	Games started	MPG	Minutes per game	FG%	Field goal percentage	3P%	3-point field goal percentage
FT%	Free throw percentage	RPG	Rebounds per game	APG	Assists per game	SPG	Steals per game	BPG	Blocks per game
TO	Turnovers per game	PPG	Points per game	**Bold**	Career high	°	League leader	‡	WNBA record

†	Denotes season(s) in which Sherrod won a WNBA championship

=== WNBA ===
==== Regular season ====
Stats current through end of 2026 season

WNBA regular season statistics
Year	Team	GP	GS	MPG	FG%	3P%	FT%	RPG	APG	SPG	BPG	TO	PPG
2024^{†}	New York	10	0	3.7	**.500**	**.333**	.500	0.3	0.5	0.3	0.1	0.2	1.9
2025	New York	**18**	0	5.8	.300	.273	**.778**	0.6	0.6	0.6	—	0.6	1.2
2025	Minnesota	8	0	4.8	.375	.000	.500	0.5	0.3	0.1	—	**0.1**	1.0
2026	Atlanta	10	**1**	7.1	.292	.400	1.000	0.9	**1.1**	0.5	**0.2**	0.3	**2.3**
2026	Seattle	3	0	**9.3**	.125	.000	.000	**1.0**	1.0	**1.7**	0.0	1.3	0.7
**Career**	3 years, 4 teams	49	1	5.7	.324	.269	.731	0.6	0.6	0.5	0.1	0.4	1.5

==== Playoffs ====
WNBA playoff statistics
Year	Team	GP	GS	MPG	FG%	3P%	FT%	RPG	APG	SPG	BPG	TO	PPG
2024^{†}	New York	2	0	**3.0**	.000	.000	—	0.5	0.5	**0.5**	0.0	0.0	0.0
2025	Minnesota	2	0	2.0	.000	—	—	0.5	0.5	0.0	0.0	0.0	0.0
**Career**	2 years, 2 teams	4	0	2.5	.000	.000	—	0.5	0.5	0.3	0.0	0.0	0.0

=== College ===
NCAA statistics
Year	Team	GP	GS	MPG	FG%	3P%	FT%	RPG	APG	SPG	BPG	TO	PPG
2019–20	Colorado	30	23	28.1	.341	.259	.706	**3.4**	**5.1**	1.3	0.2	3.3	9.9
2020–21	Colorado	12	12	26.8	.380	.273	.587	**3.4**	3.1	**2.4**	**0.3**	3.1	10.4
2021–22	Colorado	31	31	27.0	.358	.302	.596	2.7	3.8	1.8	0.1	**2.2**	8.1
2022–23	Colorado	33	33	**29.0**	.409	**.309**	.680	3.1	**5.1**	**2.4**	0.1	2.7	11.3
2023–24	Colorado	**34**	**34**	27.3	**.445**	.232	**.764**	3.1	**5.1**	2.1	0.1	2.4	**12.8**
**Career**		140	133	27.8	.392	.273	.678	3.1	4.6	2.0	0.1	2.7	10.6
