= Marquesha Davis =

American basketball player (born 2001)

No. 2 – Botaş SK
- Position: Guard
- League: Turkish Super League

Personal information
- Born: May 29, 2001 (age 25) McGehee, Arkansas, U.S.
- Listed height: 6 ft 0 in (1.83 m)

Career information
- High school: Springdale (Springdale, Arkansas)
- College: Arkansas (2019–2021); Ole Miss (2022–2024)
- WNBA draft: 2024: 1st round, 11th overall pick
- Drafted by: New York Liberty
- Playing career: 2024–present

Career history
- 2024–2025: New York Liberty
- 2024–2025: Shandong Six Stars
- 2025: Chicago Sky
- 2025–present: Botaş SK

Career highlights
- WNBA champion (2024); First-team All-SEC (2024)
- Stats at Basketball Reference

Marquesha Dra'shawn Davis (born May 29, 2001) is an American professional basketball player for Botaş SK of the Turkish Super League. She played college basketball for the Arkansas Razorbacks and Ole Miss Rebels. She was selected 11th overall by the New York Liberty in the 2024 WNBA draft.

== Early life ==
Davis was born on May 29, 2001, and grew up in the small town of McGehee, Arkansas. She first played basketball in third grade and later was a standout performer at Springdale High School. She had scored over 1,000 career points by her junior year at Springdale and was a multi-year selection to the all-state team. She committed to play college basketball for the Arkansas Razorbacks following her junior season. She then averaged over 21 points and 10 rebounds per game as a senior and was named first-team All-USA Arkansas Girls Basketball.

== College career ==
Davis played three seasons at Arkansas and saw limited playing time, averaging 2.5 points in the 2019–20 season, 4.6 points in the 2020–21 season, and 5.9 points in the 2021–22 season. She started a total of only one game in her tenure there. After appearing in seven games, one as a starter, during the 2021–22 season, Davis entered the NCAA transfer portal and transferred to the Ole Miss Rebels in December 2021.

Davis immediately saw significant playing time at Ole Miss, averaging 10.5 points and 4.8 rebounds for the team in the 2022–23 season while helping them reach the Sweet Sixteen of the NCAA Tournament. She then scored 14 points per game in 2023–24, including double figures in 25 games, and was named first-team All-Southeastern Conference while helping the Rebels reach their third-consecutive NCAA Tournament. She ended her Ole Miss career having started 59-of-67 games and scored over 1,000 points, with an average of 12.2 points per game.

== Professional career ==
=== WNBA ===
==== New York Liberty (2024–2025) ====
Davis was one of 15 players invited to attend the 2024 WNBA draft. She was selected in the first round of the draft – 11th overall – by the New York Liberty. On a championship-contending Liberty team, Davis saw limited playing time in her rookie season, appearing in 20 regular season games and averaging 4.0 minutes per game. In the playoffs, she appeared in one game for three minutes, as the Liberty claimed their first franchise championship.

On July 13, 2025, she was waived by the Liberty.

==== Chicago Sky (2025) ====
On July 22, 2025, the Chicago Sky signed Davis to a 7-day hardship contract.

=== Overseas ===
Davis signed with the Shandong Six Stars of the Women's Chinese Basketball Association for the 2024–25 season.

Davis signed with Botaş SK of the Turkish Super League for the 2025–26 season.

== Career statistics ==
Legend
GP	Games played	GS	Games started	MPG	Minutes per game	FG%	Field goal percentage	3P%	3-point field goal percentage
FT%	Free throw percentage	RPG	Rebounds per game	APG	Assists per game	SPG	Steals per game	BPG	Blocks per game
TO	Turnovers per game	PPG	Points per game	**Bold**	Career high	°	League leader	‡	WNBA record

†	Denotes season(s) in which Davis won a WNBA championship

=== WNBA ===
==== Regular season ====
Stats current as of game on July 27, 2025

WNBA regular season statistics
Year	Team	GP	GS	MPG	FG%	3P%	FT%	RPG	APG	SPG	BPG	TO	PPG
2024^{†}	New York	**20**	0	**4.0**	**.409**	**1.000**	.714	0.5	**0.2**	**0.1**	**0.2**	**0.2**	**1.2**
2025	New York	9	0	3.4	.250	.000	**.857**	**0.6**	0.1	0.0	0.1	0.3	0.9
2025	Chicago	2	0	10.5	.167	.000	—	1.0	0.0	0.0	0.5	1.5	1.0
**Career**	2 years, 2 teams	31	0	4.3	.344	.200	.786	0.5	0.2	0.0	0.2	0.3	1.1

==== Playoffs ====
WNBA playoff statistics
Year	Team	GP	GS	MPG	FG%	3P%	FT%	RPG	APG	SPG	BPG	TO	PPG
2024^{†}	New York	1	0	3.0	.500	1.000°	—	2.0	2.0	0.0	0.0	0.0	3.0
**Career**	1 year, 1 team	1	0	3.0	.500	1.000	—	2.0	2.0	0.0	0.0	0.0	3.0

=== College ===
NCAA statistics
Year	Team	GP	GS	MPG	FG%	3P%	FT%	RPG	APG	SPG	BPG	TO	PPG
2019–20	Arkansas	18	0	8.5	.356	.143	.458	2.1	0.3	0.4	0.2	0.8	2.5
2020–21	Arkansas	26	0	11.8	.453	**.300**	**.750**	2.1	0.4	0.8	0.2	**0.5**	4.6
2021–22	Arkansas	7	1	12.1	.424	.167	.667	2.4	0.6	0.9	0.1	0.6	5.9
2022–23	Ole Miss	**34**	26	22.7	**.457**	.273	.700	**4.8**	0.8	0.9	0.2	1.6	10.5
2023–24	Ole Miss	33	**33**	**27.1**	.447	.239	.687	4.7	**1.2**	**1.5**	**0.7**	1.7	**14.0**
**Career**		118	60	18.7	.445	.246	.679	3.6	0.7	1.0	0.3	1.2	8.7
