= 2024 Atlanta Dream season =

- Head coach: Tanisha Wright
- Arena: Gateway Center Arena

Results
- Record: 15–25 (.375)
- Place: 4th (Eastern)
- Playoff finish: 8th seed; Lost in First Round 0–2 to New York

The 2024 Atlanta Dream season was the 17th season for the Atlanta Dream of the Women's National Basketball Association, and their third season under head coach Tanisha Wright.

The season tipped off on Wednesday, May 15, 2024, against the Los Angeles Sparks in Los Angeles. The Dream started the season on an up-and-down run as they went 2–2 in their first four games. They defeated Washington and Las Vegas to end May 4–2. Their winning streak did not extend into June as they lost four of their first five games in the month, with the lone win coming in Chicago. They defeated Los Angeles again and Connecticut as the only other two wins in the month to finish 3–8 in June. Seven of the eight losses in the month came by double digits. Rhyne Howard injured her ankle on June 21 and missed nine games. The Dream would only win one game during her absence, and went 0–7 in July prior to the Olympic Break. The losing streak featured a three point loss in Dallas as the closest game. The Dream returned healthier from the Olympic Break and won the first three games in August. However, they lost the next four games in August, with three of those losses coming by five points or less. They finished August 3–4 and in the hunt for the eighth and final playoff spot. The Dream won two of the first three games in September, including an overtime win against Dallas. They would go on to lose their next three games, including another overtime game against Indiana, and a three point loss to playoff rivals Washington. However, they followed that with three straight wins, including a win against Washington and their other playoff rival Chicago. The final game of the season was a win at New York, where the Dream clinched the eighth seed. They finished the regular season 15–25.

The Dream faced the Liberty in the first versus eighth seed First Round playoff series. The Dream lost the best-of-three series two games to zero. They lost game one by fourteen points and game two by nine points to end their season. It was the second straight year the Dream were swept two games to zero in the First Round. After the season, the Dream and Head Coach Tanisha Wright parted ways.

== Transactions ==
=== WNBA draft ===
Round	Pick	Player	Nationality	School/Team/Country
1	12	Nyadiew Puoch	Australia	Southside Flyers (Australia)
2	20	Isobel Borlase	Australia	Adelaide Lightning (Australia)
3	32	Matilde Villa	Italy	Reyer Venezia (Italy)

=== Transactions ===
Date	Transaction
January 16, 2024	Extended qualifying offer to AD Durr
January 24, 2024	Suspended contract of Iliana Rupert for the full season (personal decision)
February 1, 2024	Traded the 8th overall pick in the 2024 WNBA draft and Aari McDonald to the Los Angeles Sparks in exchange for Jordin Canada and the 12th overall pick in the 2024 Draft
February 1, 2024	Signed Tina Charles and Aerial Powers
February 1, 2024	Re-signed Nia Coffey
February 28, 2024	Signed Khadijiah Cave to a training camp contract
February 29, 2024	Exercised team options on Rhyne Howard and Naz Hillmon
March 25, 2024	Signed Lorela Cubaj to a training camp contract
April 19, 2024	Signed Elizabeth Balogun, Taj Cole, and Khaalia Hillsman to a training camp contracts
April 27, 2024	Rescinded qualifying offer to AD Durr
April 28, 2024	Signed Destanni Henderson to a training camp contract
May 4, 2024	Traded a 2025 3rd round draft pick to the Dallas Wings in exchange for Crystal Dangerfield
May 4, 2024	Waived Elizabeth Balogun and Taj Cole
May 7, 2024	Waived Khaalia Hillsman
May 10, 2024	Waived Khadijiah Cave and Destanni Henderson
May 13, 2024	Suspended the contract of Lorela Cubaj (temporary)
May 24, 2024	Activated Lorela Cubaj
June 26, 2024	Waived Crystal Dangerfield
June 26, 2024	Signed Maya Caldwell
July 4, 2024	Signed Destanni Henderson to a 7-day hardship contract
July 9, 2024	Suspended the contract of Laeticia Amihere (temporary)
July 12, 2024	Signed Destanni Henderson to second 7-day hardship contract
July 18, 2024	Released Destanni Henderson
August 11, 2024	Activated Laeticia Amihere
September 18, 2024	Signed Ezinne Kalu

=== Roster changes ===
==== Additions ====
Personnel	Signed/Trade	Former team
Isobel Borlase	Draft	Adelaide Lightning
Maya Caldwell	Signed	Free Agent
Jordin Canada	Trade	Los Angeles Sparks
Tina Charles	Signed	Free Agent
Lorela Cubaj	Signed	Free Agent
Crystal Dangerfield	Trade	Dallas Wings
Ezinne Kalu	Signed	
Aerial Powers	Signed	Minnesota Lynx
Nyadiew Puoch	Draft	Southside Flyers
Matilde Villa	Draft	Reyer Venezia

==== Subtractions ====
Personnel	Reason	New team
Monique Billings	Signed	Los Angeles Sparks
Crystal Dangerfield	Waived	
AD Durr	Released	—
Aari McDonald	Trade	Los Angeles Sparks
Taylor Mikesell	Signed	Los Angeles Sparks
Danielle Robinson	Released	—
Iliana Rupert	Suspended Contract	—

== Roster ==
2024 Atlanta Dream roster
Players
Coaches

Pos.	No.	Nat.	Name	Height	Weight	DOB	From	Yrs
F	7	(Canada)	Amihere, Laeticia	6' 3" (1.91m)	185 lb (84kg)	2001-07-10	South Carolina	1
G	33	(United States)	Caldwell, Maya	5' 11" (1.8m)	160 lb (73kg)	1998-12-15	Georgia	2
G	3	(United States)	Canada, Jordin	5' 6" (1.68m)	135 lb (61kg)	1995-08-11	UCLA	6
C	31	(United States)	Charles, Tina	6' 4" (1.93m)	192 lb (87kg)	1988-12-05	Connecticut	12
F	12	(United States)	Coffey, Nia	6' 1" (1.85m)	182 lb (83kg)	1995-06-11	Northwestern	7
F/C	19	(Italy)	Cubaj, Lorela	6' 4" (1.93m)	200 lb (91kg)	1999-01-08	Georgia Tech	2
G	15	(United States)	Gray, Allisha	6' 0" (1.83m)	167 lb (76kg)	1995-01-12	South Carolina	6
F	00	(United States)	Hillmon, Naz	6' 2" (1.88m)	190 lb (86kg)	2000-04-05	Michigan	2
F	10	(United States)	Howard, Rhyne	6' 2" (1.88m)	175 lb (79kg)	2000-04-29	Kentucky	2
G/F	13	(United States)	Jones, Haley	6' 1" (1.85m)	187 lb (85kg)	2001-05-23	Stanford	1
G	1	(United States)	Kalu, Ezinne	5' 8" (1.73m)		1992-06-26	Savannah State	R
F	32	(United States)	Parker-Tyus, Cheyenne (injured)	6' 4" (1.93m)	193 lb (88kg)	1993-08-22	Middle Tennessee	9
G/F	23	(United States)	Powers, Aerial (injured)	5' 9" (1.75m)	166 lb (75kg)	1994-01-17	Michigan State	8
C	21	(France)	Rupert, Iliana (S)	6' 4" (1.93m)	189 lb (86kg)	2001-07-12	France	2
G		(Australia)	Borlase, Isobel (DP)	5' 11" (1.8m)		2004-09-12	Australia
F		(Australia)	Puoch, Nyadiew (DP)	6' 3" (1.91m)		2004-06-23	Australia
G		(Italy)	Villa, Matilde (DP)	5' 7" (1.7m)		2004-12-09	Italy

Head coach
(United States) Tanisha Wright (Penn State)
Assistant coaches
(United States) Vickie Johnson (Louisiana Tech)
(Australia) Paul Goriss
(United States) Barbara Turner (Connecticut)
Athletic trainer
(United States) Natalie Trotter
Strength and conditioning coach
(United States) Drew Williams

Legend

- (C) Team captain
- (DP) Unsigned draft pick
- (FA) Free agent
- (S) Suspended
- Injured

=== Depth chart ===
Pos.	Starter	Bench
PG	Jordin Canada	Haley Jones; Crystal Dangerfield
SG	Allisha Gray	Aerial Powers
SF	Rhyne Howard	Laeticia Amihere; Nia Coffey
PF	Cheyenne Parker	Naz Hillmon
C	Tina Charles	Lorela Cubaj

== Schedule ==
=== Pre-season ===
2024 pre-season game log
Total: 1–1 (Home: 1–0; Road: 0–1)
May: 1–1 (Home: 1–0; Road: 0–1)

Game	Date	Team	Score	High points	High rebounds	High assists	Location Attendance	Record
1	May 4	Washington	W 87–84	Cole; Powers (9)	Cave; Hillsman (5)	Taja Cole (6)	Gateway Center Arena	1–0
2	May 9	@ Indiana	L 80–83	Rhyne Howard (13)	Tina Charles (7)	Destanni Henderson (5)	Gainbridge Fieldhouse	1–1

2024 pre-season schedule

=== Regular season ===
2024 game log
Total: 15–25 (Home: 8–12; Road: 7–13)
May: 4–2 (Home: 2–1; Road: 2–1)

Game	Date	Team	Score	High points	High rebounds	High assists	Location Attendance	Record
1	May 15	@ Los Angeles	W 92–81	Rhyne Howard (25)	Tina Charles (14)	Naz Hillmon (5)	Walter Pyramid; 3,847	1–0
2	May 18	@ Phoenix	L 85–88	Allisha Gray (22)	Rhyne Howard (9)	Haley Jones (5)	Footprint Center; 10,251	1–1
3	May 21	Dallas	W 83–78	Allisha Gray (21)	Tina Charles (11)	Rhyne Howard (4)	Gateway Center Arena; 3,265	2–1
4	May 26	Minnesota	L 79–92	Rhyne Howard (23)	Cheyenne Parker-Tyus (8)	Howard, Jones (5)	Gateway Center Arena; 3,265	2–2
5	May 29	@ Washington	W 73–67	Allisha Gray (19)	Tina Charles (15)	Howard, Jones (4)	Entertainment and Sports Arena; 4,200	3–2
6	May 31	Las Vegas	W 78–74	Allisha Gray (24)	Charles, Parker-Tyus (8)	Charles, Gray (3)	Gateway Center Arena; 4,015	4–2

June : 3–8 (Home: 1–5; Road: 2–3)

Game	Date	Team	Score	High points	High rebounds	High assists	Location Attendance	Record
7	June 2	Connecticut	L 50–69	Tina Charles (12)	Tina Charles (12)	Crystal Dangerfield (3)	Gateway Center Arena; 3,265	4–3
8	June 6	New York	L 61–78	Allisha Gray (16)	Tina Charles (8)	Rhyne Howard (5)	Gateway Center Arena; 3,255	4–4
9	June 8	@ Chicago	W 89–80	Tina Charles (22)	Tina Charles (7)	Rhyne Howard (10)	Wintrust Arena; 8,804	5–4
10	June 11	Washington	L 87–68	Rhyne Howard (16)	Tina Charles (12)	Allisha Gray (5)	Gateway Center Arena; 3,260	5–5
11	June 13	@ Indiana	L 84–91	Rhyne Howard (26)	Charles, Parker-Tyus (6)	Coffey, Parker-Tyus (5)	Gainbridge Fieldhouse; 16,651	5–6
12	June 16	Los Angeles	W 87–74	Allisha Gray (25)	Tina Charles (11)	Rhyne Howard (5)	Gateway Center Arena; 3,260	6–6
13	June 19	@ Minnesota	L 55–68	Tina Charles (14)	Tina Charles (10)	Allisha Gray (4)	Target Center; 8,206	6–7
14	June 21	Indiana	L 79–91	Tina Charles (24)	Naz Hillmon (9)	Haley Jones (5)	State Farm Arena; 17,575	6–8
15	June 23	New York	L 75–96	Tina Charles (19)	Haley Jones (8)	Gray, Jones (4)	Gateway Center Arena; 3,260	6–9
16	June 28	@ Connecticut	W 78–74	Allisha Gray (17)	Charles, Jones (6)	Jordin Canada (6)	Mohegan Sun Arena; 7,008	7–9
17	June 30	@ New York	L 75–81	Allisha Gray (24)	Tina Charles (12)	Jordin Canada (9)	Barclays Center; 10,823	7–10

July : 0–7 (Home: 0–2; Road: 0–5)

Game	Date	Team	Score	High points	High rebounds	High assists	Location Attendance	Record
18	July 2	Chicago	L 77–85	Charles, Gray (19)	Tina Charles (14)	Jordin Canada (7)	Gateway Center Arena; 3,260	7–11
19	July 5	@ Dallas	L 82–85	Allisha Gray (19)	Tina Charles (8)	Allisha Gray (8)	College Park Center; 5,872	7–12
20	July 7	@ Connecticut	L 67–80	Allisha Gray (19)	Laeticia Amihere (8)	Tina Charles (4)	Mohegan Sun Arena; 7,527	7–13
21	July 10	@ Chicago	L 69–78	Allisha Gray (20)	Cheyenne Parker-Tyus (8)	Maya Caldwell (4)	Wintrust Arena; 9,025	7–14
22	July 12	Las Vegas	L 70–84	Cheyenne Parker-Tyus (17)	Tina Charles (12)	Destanni Henderson (5)	Gateway Center Arena; 3,344	7–15
23	July 14	@ Seattle	L 70–81	Maya Caldwell (19)	Parker-Tyus, Powers (8)	Maya Caldwell (4)	Climate Pledge Arena; 10,036	7–16
24	July 17	@ Minnesota	L 79–86	Cheyenne Parker-Tyus (16)	Rhyne Howard (9)	Destanni Henderson (4)	Target Center; 15,013	7–17

August : 3–4 (Home: 3–2; Road: 0–2)

Game	Date	Team	Score	High points	High rebounds	High assists	Location Attendance	Record
25	August 16	Seattle	W 83–81	Rhyne Howard (30)	Naz Hillmon (13)	Jordin Canada (8)	Gateway Center Arena; 3,260	8–17
26	August 18	Connecticut	W 82–70	Tina Charles (22)	Tina Charles (15)	Jordin Canada (6)	Gateway Center Arena; 3,330	9–17
27	August 21	Phoenix	W 72–63	Allisha Gray (21)	Tina Charles (17)	Jordin Canada (6)	Gateway Center Arena; 3,260	10–17
28	August 23	Phoenix	L 80–82	Allisha Gray (22)	Tina Charles (13)	Jordin Canada (6)	Gateway Center Arena; 3,260	10–18
29	August 26	Indiana	L 79–84	Tina Charles (28)	Nia Coffey (9)	Jordin Canada (6)	State Farm Arena; 17,608	10–19
30	August 28	@ Seattle	L 81–85	Allisha Gray (22)	Tina Charles (17)	Tina Charles (10)	Climate Pledge Arena; 9,228	10–20
31	August 30	@ Las Vegas	L 72–83	Allisha Gray (17)	Allisha Gray (9)	Allisha Gray (6)	Michelob Ultra Arena; 10,397	10–21

September : 5–4 (Home: 2–2; Road: 3–2)

Game	Date	Team	Score	High points	High rebounds	High assists	Location Attendance	Record
32	September 1	@ Los Angeles	W 80–62	Tina Charles (23)	Tina Charles (9)	Jordin Canada (6)	Crypto.com Arena; 11,165	11–21
33	September 3	@ Phoenix	L 66–74	Rhyne Howard (31)	Tina Charles (12)	Jordin Canada (6)	Footprint Center; 7,639	11–22
34	September 6	Dallas	W 107–96 (OT)	Rhyne Howard (33)	Tina Charles (13)	Jordin Canada (10)	Gateway Center Arena; 3,260	12–22
35	September 8	@ Indiana	L 100–104 (OT)	Rhyne Howard (36)	Tina Charles (12)	3 players (5)	Gainbridge Fieldhouse; 17,274	12–23
36	September 10	Minnesota	L 64–76	Allisha Gray (17)	Tina Charles (14)	Jordin Canada (3)	Gateway Center Arena; 3,260	12–24
37	September 13	Washington	L 69–72	Allisha Gray (17)	Naz Hillmon (11)	Allisha Gray (5)	Gateway Center Arena; 3,260	12–25
38	September 15	@ Washington	W 76–73 (OT)	Tina Charles (20)	Tina Charles (10)	Jordin Canada (5)	Entertainment and Sports Arena; 4,200	13–25
39	September 17	Chicago	W 86–70	Jordin Canada (18)	Tina Charles (14)	Jordin Canada (5)	Gateway Center Arena; 3,335	14–25
40	September 19	@ New York	W 78–67	Hillman, Howard (13)	Tina Charles (10)	Jordin Canada (6)	Barclays Center; 12,721	15–25

2024 season schedule

=== Playoffs ===
2024 playoff game log
First round vs. New York Liberty
Lost Series: 0–2

Game	Date	Team	Score	High points	High rebounds	High assists	Location Attendance	Series
1	September 22	@ New York	L 69–83	Rhyne Howard (14)	Tina Charles (7)	Canada, Howard (4)	Barclays Center; 12,115	0–1
2	September 24	@ New York	L 82–91	Allisha Gray (26)	Naz Hillmon (10)	Jordin Canada (11)	Barclays Center; 11,003	0–2

2024 playoff schedule

== Standings ==
#	Team	W	L	PCT	GB	Conf.	Home	Road	Cup
1	yx – New York Liberty	32	8	.800	—	16–4	16–4	16–4	5–0
2	cx – Minnesota Lynx	30	10	.750	2	14–6	16–4	14–6	4–1
3	x – Connecticut Sun	28	12	.700	4	14–6	14–6	14–6	4–1
4	x – Las Vegas Aces	27	13	.675	5	12–8	13–7	14–6	2–3
5	x – Seattle Storm	25	15	.625	7	13–7	14–6	11–9	4–1
6	x – Indiana Fever	20	20	.500	12	11–9	12–8	8–12	3–2
7	x – Phoenix Mercury	19	21	.475	13	10–10	10–10	9–11	3–2
8	x – Atlanta Dream	15	25	.375	17	7–13	8–12	7–13	1–4
9	e – Washington Mystics	14	26	.350	18	7–13	5–15	9–11	1–4
10	e – Chicago Sky	13	27	.325	19	5–15	6–14	7–13	1–4
11	e – Dallas Wings	9	31	.225	23	6–14	7–13	2–18	0–5
12	e – Los Angeles Sparks	8	32	.200	24	5–15	5–15	3–17	2–3

Notes

(#) – League Standing
c – Commissioner's Cup winners
y – Regular Season Champion
x – Clinched playoff berth
e – Eliminated from playoff contention
Source: Overall standings and Commissioner's Cup Standings

== Playoffs ==
**First round** Best-of-3
**1**	**New York Liberty**	**2**
8	Atlanta Dream	0
**4**	**Las Vegas Aces**	**2**
5	Seattle Storm	0
2	**Minnesota Lynx**	**2**
7	Phoenix Mercury	0
3	**Connecticut Sun**	**2**
6	Indiana Fever	0

**Semifinals**; Best-of-5
1	**New York Liberty**	**3**
4	Las Vegas Aces	1
2	**Minnesota Lynx**	**3**
3	Connecticut Sun	2

**Finals**; Best-of-5
1	**New York Liberty**	**3**
2	Minnesota Lynx	2

- **Bold** – Series winner
- Italic – Team with home-court-advantage

== Statistics ==
Legend
GP	Games played	GS	Games started	MPG	Minutes per game	RPG	Rebounds per game
APG	Assists per game	SPG	Steals per game	BPG	Blocks per game	PPG	Points per game
FG%	Field-goal percentage	3P%	3-point field-goal percentage	FT%	Free-throw percentage	TO	Turnovers per game
PF	Fouls per game		Team leader		League leader

=== Regular season ===
Player	GP	GS	MPG	FG%	3P%	FT%	RPG	APG	SPG	BPG	TO	PF	PPG
Rhyne Howard	30	29	33.9	.371	.329	.784	4.4	3.2	1.8	0.6	1.7	2.1	17.3
Allisha Gray	40	40	33.3	.403	.342	.769	4.4	2.7	1.1	0.7	1.7	2.4	15.6
Tina Charles	39	39	29.7	.456	.262	.785	9.6	2.3	0.9	0.5	1.6	2.5	14.9
Jordin Canada	20	18	31.2	.390	.281	.781	3.5	5.8	1.6	0.3	2.1	2.6	10.6
Cheyenne Parker	25	11	19.7	.444	.214	.886	4.8	1.5	0.8	0.4	2.1	2.4	9.2
Aerial Powers	17	2	17.9	.355	.389	.791	3.3	1.4	0.9	0.2	1.1	2.1	8.6
Naz Hillmon	40	19	21.7	.552	.333	.762	4.8	1.3	0.7	0.3	1.0	1.4	5.7
Maya Caldwell ^{≠}	25	6	16.2	.416	.300	.800	1.8	1.1	0.6	0.2	0.9	1.2	5.2
Destanni Henderson ^{≠} ^{‡}	6	0	17.5	.345	.100	.429	2.0	2.5	0.3	0.2	1.7	0.8	4.0
Haley Jones	40	24	17.8	.397	.214	.702	2.2	2.1	0.4	0.3	1.7	2.0	3.9
Nia Coffey	40	11	13.3	.324	.273	.762	2.4	1.2	0.3	0.7	1.0	1.2	3.3
Crystal Dangerfield ^{‡}	15	0	14.1	.278	.217	1.000	1.1	1.7	0.3	0.2	0.6	0.9	3.1
Ezinne Kalu ^{≠}	1	0	13.0	.333	.000	.500	1.0	0.0	1.0	0.0	0.0	4.0	3.0
Lorela Cubaj	28	1	7.9	.429	—	.600	1.5	0.5	0.3	0.1	0.4	1.2	1.2
Laeticia Amihere	16	0	5.2	.269	—	.294	1.7	0.2	0.1	0.2	0.5	0.4	1.2

^{‡}Waived/Released during the season
^{†}Traded during the season
^{≠}Acquired during the season

=== Playoffs ===
Player	GP	GS	MPG	FG%	3P%	FT%	RPG	APG	SPG	BPG	TO	PF	PPG
Allisha Gray	2	2	33.5	.520	.455	.800	4.0	2.0	0.0	0.5	2.5	1.5	17.5
Rhyne Howard	2	2	34.5	.448	.231	.500	5.5	3.5	2.5	2.5	1.0	1.5	16.5
Tina Charles	2	2	29.0	.522	—	.667	6.5	1.5	0.0	0.0	1.0	2.5	13.0
Laeticia Amihere	1	0	10.0	.600	—	.500	5.0	0.0	0.0	1.0	0.0	2.0	8.0
Naz Hillmon	2	2	24.0	.538	—	1.000	6.5	0.5	0.5	0.0	2.0	1.0	7.5
Jordin Canada	2	2	27.0	.417	.250	.000	1.0	7.5	0.5	0.0	3.5	1.0	5.5
Ezinne Kalu	1	0	15.0	.250	.000	.667	0.0	2.0	1.0	0.0	2.0	1.0	4.0
Haley Jones	2	0	9.0	.429	—	1.000	1.0	0.5	0.5	0.0	1.0	0.5	4.0
Nia Coffey	2	0	11.0	.333	.250	—	2.0	1.0	0.0	0.5	0.5	3.0	3.5
Lorela Cubaj	2	0	11.0	.500	—	—	2.5	0.5	0.5	0.0	0.0	1.5	1.0
Maya Caldwell	2	0	9.0	.250	.000	—	1.5	1.0	1.0	0.5	0.0	0.0	1.0

== Awards and honors ==
Recipient	Award	Date awarded	Ref.
Allisha Gray	WNBA All-Star	July 2, 2024	
