= 2024 Los Angeles Sparks season =

- Head coach: Curt Miller
- Arena: Walter Pyramid (Capacity: 4,000 (first two games of the season); Crypto.com Arena (Capacity: 19,068)

Results
- Record: 8–32 (.200)
- Place: 6th (Western)
- Playoff finish: Did not qualify

Media
- Television: ABC, ESPN, ESPN2, CBS, Paramount+, CBSSN, NBA TV, ION

The 2024 Los Angeles Sparks season was the franchise's 28th season in the Women's National Basketball Association, and the second season under head coach Curt Miller. The season tipped off on May 15, 2024, in Long Beach versus the Atlanta Dream, and ended on September 19 against the Minnesota Lynx.

The season started slowly for the Sparks as they lost both of their opening two games. They defeated Washington by two points on May 21 to earn their first win of the season. They lost the following two games including a one point loss to Dallas. They defeated Indiana before losing to Chicago to end the month with a 2–5 record. Their June started off with two losses as well. They won two games to follow including a victory at home against Last Vegas. That would be the highlight of the month as the team went on a seven game losing streak from there to finish the month with a 2–9 record. The only non-double digit loss during that streak was a 70–79 loss to Connecticut on June 18. Their losing streak extended one more game into July before they defeated Last Vegas in overtime. They would lose the next two games before defeating Dallas. They lost to Seattle to finish July 2–4 and head into the Olympic break. The Sparks lost the first six games after returning from the Olympic break before defeating New York to finish August 1–6. Well out of the playoff race, the Sparks lost the first eight games of September. The closest loss of the streak was by three-points at Seattle on September 15. The team finished the season with a win over Minnesota. The season was marred by a multitude of injuries, including a season-ending ACL tear to the team's No. 2 draft pick, Cameron Brink, who wound up missing the remainder of the season after playing just 15 games. Brink's injury also caused her to miss the 2024 Summer Olympics, with her teammate Dearica Hamby taking her place on the United States women's national 3x3 team. The Sparks finished with just 8 wins and 32 losses, missing the playoffs for the fourth consecutive season and failing to improve on their 17-23 record from 2023. Their eight wins were the team's lowest total in franchise history and their 32 losses was the highest in a single season in league's history.

== Transactions ==
=== WNBA draft ===
Round	Pick	Player	Nationality	School/team/country
1	2	Cameron Brink	United States	Stanford
1	4	Rickea Jackson	United States	Tennessee
3	28	McKenzie Forbes	United States	USC

=== Transactions ===
Date	Transaction
January 5, 2024	Hired Raegan Pebley as General Manager
January 17, 2024	Jasmine Thomas retired
January 31, 2024	Traded the 19th pick in the 2024 WNBA draft to Seattle in exchange for Kia Nurse
February 1, 2024	Re-signed Layshia Clarendon
February 1, 2024	Traded the 12th overall pick in the 2024 draft and Jordin Canada to the Atlanta Dream in exchange for Aari McDonald and the 8th overall pick in the 2024 draft
February 1, 2024	Re-signed Rae Burrell
February 2, 2024	Signed Monique Billings
February 2, 2024	Signed Virag Kiss to a Training Camp Contract
February 2, 2024	Signed Taylor Mikesell to a Training Camp Contract
February 6, 2024	Signed Lexie Brown to an Extension
February 21, 2024	Traded the 8th overall pick in the 2024 draft to Chicago in exchange for Julie Allemand, the rights to Li Yueru and a third round pick in the 2025 draft.
March 21, 2024	Hired Christine Monjer as President
April 17, 2024	Signed Blake Dietrick to a Training Camp Contract
April 18, 2024	Signed McKenzie Forbes to a Rookie Contract
April 19, 2024	Signed Rickea Jackson to a Rookie Contract
April 20, 2024	Signed Cameron Brink to a Rookie Contract
April 30, 2024	Waived Virág Kiss
May 6, 2024	Waived Taylor Mikesell
May 12, 2024	Waived Nia Clouden, Blake Dietrick, and McKenzie Forbes
May 13, 2024	Suspended the contract of Julie Allemand (full season)
May 13, 2024	Waived Monique Billings
June 22, 2024	Signed Queen Egbo to hardship contract
June 29, 2024	Waived Queen Egbo
July 4, 2024	Signed Crystal Dangerfield to a 7-day hardship contract
July 12, 2024	Signed Crystal Dangerfield to a second 7-day contract
July 12, 2024	Suspended the contract of Li Yueru (temporary)
August 7, 2024	Activated Li Yueru
August 16, 2024	Signed Crystal Dangerfield to a third 7-day contract
August 17, 2024	Signed Odyssey Sims to 7-day contract
August 22, 2024	Signed Azurá Stevens and Stephanie Talbot to extensions through 2025
August 22, 2024	Signed Crystal Dangerfield to a rest of season contract
August 24, 2024	Signed Odyssey Sims to a second 7-day contract
August 31, 2024	Released Odyssey Sims and signed Simms to a 7-day contract
September 7, 2024	Released Odyssey Sims and signed Simms to a rest-of-season contract
September 20, 2024	Layshia Clarendon announced their retirement|
September 24, 2024	Head coach, Curt Miller, was fired

=== Roster changes ===
==== Additions ====
Personnel	Signed/Trade	Former team
Julie Allemand	Trade	Chicago Sky
Cameron Brink	Draft	Stanford
Rickea Jackson	Draft	Tennessee
Crystal Dangerfield	Signed	—
Queen Egbo	Signed	Connecticut Sun
Aari McDonald	Trade	Atlanta Dream
Kia Nurse	Trade	Seattle Storm
Odyssey Sims	Signed	Dallas Wings
Stephanie Talbot	Return from Injury	—
Li Yueru	Trade	Chicago Sky

==== Subtractions ====
Personnel	Reason	New team
Jordin Canada	Trade	Atlanta Dream
Queen Egbo	Waived	Las Vegas Aces
Chiney Ogwumike	Free Agency	—
Nneka Ogwumike	Free Agency	Seattle Storm
Karlie Samuelson	Free Agency	Washington Mystics
Jasmine Thomas	Retired	

== Roster ==
2024 Los Angeles Sparks roster
Players
Coaches

Pos.	No.	Nat.	Name	Height	Weight	DOB	From	Yrs
G	20	(Belgium)	Allemand, Julie (S)	5' 8" (1.73m)	147 lb (67kg)	1996-07-07	Belgium	2
F	22	(United States)	Brink, Cameron (injured)	6' 4" (1.93m)	170 lb (77kg)	2001-12-31	Stanford	R
G	4	(United States)	Brown, Lexie (injured)	5' 9" (1.75m)	162 lb (73kg)	1994-10-24	Duke	6
G/F	12	(United States)	Burrell, Rae	6' 2" (1.88m)	168 lb (76kg)	2000-06-21	Tennessee	2
G	1	(United States)	Cooke, Zia	5' 9" (1.75m)	163 lb (74kg)	2001-01-09	South Carolina	1
G	14	(United States)	Dangerfield, Crystal	5' 5" (1.65m)	130 lb (59kg)	1998-05-11	Connecticut	4
F	5	(United States)	Hamby, Dearica	6' 3" (1.91m)	189 lb (86kg)	1993-11-06	Wake Forest	9
F	2	(United States)	Jackson, Rickea	6' 2" (1.88m)	175 lb (79kg)	2001-03-16	Tennessee	R
C	28	(China)	Li Yueru	6' 7" (2.01m)		1999-03-28	China	1
G	15	(United States)	McDonald, Aari (injured)	5' 6" (1.68m)	141 lb (64kg)	1998-08-20	Arizona	3
G	10	(Canada)	Nurse, Kia	6' 0" (1.83m)	181 lb (82kg)	1996-02-22	Connecticut	5
G	6	(United States)	Sims, Odyssey	5' 8" (1.73m)	155 lb (70kg)	1992-07-13	Baylor	10
F/C	23	(United States)	Stevens, Azurá	6' 6" (1.98m)	180 lb (82kg)	1996-02-01	Connecticut	6
F	7	(Australia)	Talbot, Stephanie	6' 2" (1.88m)	192 lb (87kg)	1994-06-15	Australia	5

Head coach
(United States) Curt Miller (Baldwin Wallace)
Assistant coaches
(United States) Neil Harrow (University of the West of Scotland)
(United States) Nola Henry (College of Charleston)
(United States) Camille Little (North Carolina)
Athletic trainer
(United States) Courtney Watson (California)
Strength and conditioning coach
(United States) Kelly Dormandy (Springfield)

Legend

- (C) Team captain
- (DP) Unsigned draft pick
- (FA) Free agent
- (S) Suspended
- Injured

=== Depth chart ===
Pos.	Starter	Bench
PG	Lexie Brown	Zia Cooke
SG	Layshia Clarendon	Aari McDonald
SF	Kia Nurse	Rae Burrell; Rickea Jackson
PF	Dearica Hamby	Stephanie Talbot
C	Cameron Brink	Azurá Stevens; Li Yueru

== Schedule ==
=== Pre-season ===
2024 pre-season game log
Total: 2–0 (Home: 0–0; Road: 2–0)
May: 2–0 (Home: 0–0; Road: 2–0)

Game	Date	Team	Score	High points	High rebounds	High assists	Location Attendance	Record
1	May 5	vs. Seattle	W 84–79	Dearica Hamby (17)	Dearica Hamby (9)	Dearica Hamby (5)	Rogers Place; 16,655	1–0
2	May 10	@ Phoenix	W 98–85	Cooke; Hamby (21)	Dearica Hamby (7)	Brown; Hamby; McDonald; Talbot (3)	Footprint Center; 4,598	2–0

2024 pre-season schedule

=== Regular season ===
2024 game log
Total: 8–32 (Home: 5–15; Road: 3–17)
May: 2–5 (Home: 1–3; Road: 1–2)

Game	Date	Team	Score	High points	High rebounds	High assists	Location Attendance	Record
1	May 15	Atlanta	L 81–91	Kia Nurse (23)	Dearica Hamby (14)	Layshia Clarendon (10)	Walter Pyramid; 3,847	0–1
2	May 18	@ Las Vegas	L 82–89	Dearica Hamby (29)	Dearica Hamby (9)	Layshia Clarendon (4)	Michelob Ultra Arena; 10,286	0–2
3	May 21	Washington	W 70–68	Lexie Brown (20)	Dearica Hamby (18)	Lexie Brown (6)	Walter Pyramid; 3,627	1–2
4	May 24	Indiana	L 73–78	Dearica Hamby (18)	Dearica Hamby (12)	Dearica Hamby (7)	Crypto.com Arena; 19,103	1–3
5	May 26	Dallas	L 83–84	Cameron Brink (21)	Dearica Hamby (13)	Lexie Brown (6)	Crypto.com Arena; 10,340	1–4
6	May 28	@ Indiana	W 88–82	Kia Nurse (22)	Dearica Hamby (10)	Dearica Hamby (5)	Gainbridge Fieldhouse; 16,013	2–4
7	May 30	@ Chicago	L 73–83	Dearica Hamby (24)	Dearica Hamby (13)	Lexie Brown (4)	Wintrust Arena; 7,911	2–5

June: 2–9 (Home: 2–1; Road: 0–8)

Game	Date	Team	Score	High points	High rebounds	High assists	Location Attendance	Record
8	June 2	@ Phoenix	L 68–87	Dearica Hamby (23)	Rickea Jackson (7)	Aari McDonald (5)	Footprint Center; 10,207	2–6
9	June 5	Minnesota	L 62–86	Dearica Hamby (17)	Dearica Hamby (11)	Stephanie Talbot (3)	Crypto.com Arena; 8,104	2–7
10	June 7	Dallas	W 81–72	Dearica Hamby (22)	Dearica Hamby (12)	Brown, McDonald (6)	Crypto.com Arena; 10,123	3–7
11	June 9	Las Vegas	W 96–92	Dearica Hamby (18)	Dearica Hamby (10)	Clarendon, Hamby (5)	Crypto.com Arena; 13,900	4–7
12	June 11	@ Seattle	L 79–95	Li Yueru (18)	Dearica Hamby (11)	Brown, Hamby (5)	Climate Pledge Arena; 8,202	4–8
13	June 14	@ Minnesota	L 76–81	Rickea Jackson (19)	Dearica Hamby (11)	Aari McDonald (7)	Target Center; 8,117	4–9
14	June 16	@ Atlanta	L 74–87	Brink, Jackson (16)	Dearica Hamby (8)	Aari McDonald (5)	Gateway Center Arena; 3,260	4–10
15	June 18	@ Connecticut	L 70–79	Aari McDonald (14)	Rickea Jackson (7)	Aari McDonald (7)	Mohegan Sun Arena; 7,853	4–11
16	June 20	@ New York	L 80–93	Aari McDonald (15)	Hamby, Talbot (11)	Rae Burrell (4)	Barclays Center; 10,955	4–12
17	June 22	@ New York	L 88–98	Dearica Hamby (20)	Stephanie Talbot (8)	Stephanie Talbot (7)	Barclays Center; 13,639	4–13
18	June 28	@ Phoenix	L 78–92	Dearica Hamby (29)	Dearica Hamby (7)	Aari McDonald (10)	Footprint Center; 14,363	4–14

July : 2–4 (Home: 1–4; Road: 1–0)

Game	Date	Team	Score	High points	High rebounds	High assists	Location Attendance	Record
19	July 2	Washington	L 80–82	McDonald, Talbot (17)	Dearica Hamby (11)	Dearica Hamby (7)	Crypto.com Arena; 9,164	4–15
20	July 5	Las Vegas	W 98–93 (OT)	Dearica Hamby (28)	Dearica Hamby (14)	Stephanie Talbot (9)	Crypto.com Arena; 13,840	5–15
21	July 7	Phoenix	L 78–84	Dearica Hamby (25)	Dearica Hamby (9)	Aari McDonald (6)	Crypto.com Arena; 11,618	5–16
22	July 9	Minnesota	L 67–82	Dearica Hamby (18)	Dearica Hamby (8)	Clarendon, McDonald, Stevens (4)	Crypto.com Arena; 9,533	5–17
23	July 13	@ Dallas	W 87–81	Dearica Hamby (27)	Azurá Stevens (8)	Dearica Hamby (5)	College Park Center; 6,251	6–17
24	July 16	Seattle	L 83–89	Azurá Stevens (24)	Azurá Stevens (15)	Layshia Clarendon (6)	Crypto.com Arena; 18,724	6–18

August : 1–6 (Home: 1–2; Road: 0–4)

Game	Date	Team	Score	High points	High rebounds	High assists	Location Attendance	Record
25	August 15	New York	L 68–103	Rae Burrell (15)	Dearica Hamby (13)	Dearica Hamby (5)	Crypto.com Arena; 11,120	6–19
26	August 17	Chicago	L 86–90	Kia Nurse (16)	Dearica Hamby (9)	Crystal Dangerfield (6)	Crypto.com Arena; 16,551	6–20
27	August 18	@ Las Vegas	L 71–87	Rickea Jackson (15)	Dearica Hamby (11)	Odyssey Sims (5)	Michelob Ultra Arena; 10,311	6–21
28	August 20	@ Connecticut	L 61–69	Jackson, Stevens (14)	Dearica Hamby (10)	Crystal Dangerfield (4)	TD Garden; 19,125	6–22
29	August 23	@ Washington	L 74–80	Rickea Jackson (17)	Dearica Hamby (10)	Dangerfield, Simms (5)	Entertainment and Sports Arena; 4,200	6–23
30	August 25	@ Dallas	L 110–113	Odyssey Sims (26)	Tied (6 players, 3)	Odyssey Sims (10)	College Park Center; 5,925	6–24
31	August 28	New York	W 94–88	Dearica Hamby (21)	Dearica Hamby (7)	Odyssey Sims (7)	Crypto.com Arena; 10,403	7–24

September : 1–8 (Home: 0–5; Road: 1–3)

Game	Date	Team	Score	High points	High rebounds	High assists	Location Attendance	Record
32	September 1	Atlanta	L 62–80	Li Yueru (14)	Dearica Hamby (9)	Odyssey Sims (6)	Crypto.com Arena; 11,165	7–25
33	September 4	@ Indiana	L 86–93	Odyssey Sims (20)	Azurá Stevens (11)	Odyssey Sims (6)	Gainbridge Fieldhouse; 16,645	7–26
34	September 6	@ Chicago	L 78–92	Dearica Hamby (21)	Azurá Stevens (9)	Odyssey Sims (6)	Wintrust Arena; 9,025	7–27
35	September 8	Connecticut	L 67–79	Rickea Jackson (23)	Li Yueru (8)	Azurá Stevens (5)	Crypto.com Arena; 10,627	7–28
36	September 10	Connecticut	L 66–86	Rickea Jackson (16)	Azurá Stevens (17)	Odyssey Sims (6)	Crypto.com Arena; 8,253	7–29
37	September 11	Seattle	L 82–90	Rickea Jackson (22)	Azurá Stevens (15)	Odyssey Sims (6)	Crypto.com Arena; 9,561	7–30
38	September 15	@ Seattle	L 87–90	Dearica Hamby (25)	Dearica Hamby (11)	Odyssey Sims (5)	Climate Pledge Arena; 11,301	7–31
39	September 17	Phoenix	L 81–85	Dearica Hamby (21)	Li Yueru (12)	Crystal Dangerfield (5)	Crypto.com Arena; 11,294	7–32
40	September 19	@ Minnesota	W 68–51	Dearica Hamby (20)	Rickea Jackson (8)	Odyssey Sims (9)	Target Center; 7,908	8–32

2024 season schedule

== Standings ==
#	Team	W	L	PCT	GB	Conf.	Home	Road	Cup
1	yx – New York Liberty	32	8	.800	—	16–4	16–4	16–4	5–0
2	cx – Minnesota Lynx	30	10	.750	2	14–6	16–4	14–6	4–1
3	x – Connecticut Sun	28	12	.700	4	14–6	14–6	14–6	4–1
4	x – Las Vegas Aces	27	13	.675	5	12–8	13–7	14–6	2–3
5	x – Seattle Storm	25	15	.625	7	13–7	14–6	11–9	4–1
6	x – Indiana Fever	20	20	.500	12	11–9	12–8	8–12	3–2
7	x – Phoenix Mercury	19	21	.475	13	10–10	10–10	9–11	3–2
8	x – Atlanta Dream	15	25	.375	17	7–13	8–12	7–13	1–4
9	e – Washington Mystics	14	26	.350	18	7–13	5–15	9–11	1–4
10	e – Chicago Sky	13	27	.325	19	5–15	6–14	7–13	1–4
11	e – Dallas Wings	9	31	.225	23	6–14	7–13	2–18	0–5
12	e – Los Angeles Sparks	8	32	.200	24	5–15	5–15	3–17	2–3

Notes

(#) – League Standing
c – Commissioner's Cup winners
y – Regular Season Champion
x – Clinched playoff berth
e – Eliminated from playoff contention
Source: Overall standings and Commissioner's Cup Standings

== Statistics ==
Legend
GP	Games played	GS	Games started	MPG	Minutes per game	RPG	Rebounds per game
APG	Assists per game	SPG	Steals per game	BPG	Blocks per game	PPG	Points per game
FG%	Field-goal percentage	3P%	3-point field-goal percentage	FT%	Free-throw percentage	TO	Turnovers per game
PF	Fouls per game		Team leader		League leader

=== Regular season ===
Player	GP	GS	MPG	FG%	3P%	FT%	RPG	APG	SPG	BPG	TO	PF	PPG
Dearica Hamby	40	40	33.7	.512	.341	.631	9.2	3.5	1.7	0.2	3.0	2.8	17.3
Rickea Jackson	40	35	28.8	.456	.347	.807	3.9	1.5	0.7	0.4	1.9	1.8	13.4
Odyssey Sims ^{≠}	15	10	26.3	.438	.154	.838	1.7	5.1	0.9	0.1	2.4	1.4	9.8
Azurá Stevens	20	19	24.7	.399	.350	.815	7.0	1.9	0.9	0.9	1.8	2.0	9.6
Aari McDonald	26	10	21.8	.403	.319	.843	2.0	3.7	0.9	0.2	1.8	2.0	8.7
Lexie Brown	16	8	23.7	.321	.304	.889	2.3	3.3	1.1	0.1	1.9	1.4	8.1
Kia Nurse	40	27	20.3	.388	.331	.793	1.6	1.3	0.5	0.0	1.2	1.8	7.6
Cameron Brink	15	15	22.0	.398	.323	.840	5.3	1.7	1.1	2.3	2.3	4.0	7.5
Rae Burrell	37	7	15.6	.362	.333	.780	1.8	1.1	0.8	0.3	1.0	1.6	5.9
Li Yueru	38	2	14.4	.463	.267	.898	3.7	0.6	0.3	0.2	0.9	2.1	5.1
Layshia Clarendon	21	12	16.0	.427	.350	.870	1.8	2.6	0.7	0.0	1.2	2.1	4.3
Zia Cooke	29	0	8.9	.321	.297	.690	0.6	0.6	0.3	0.1	0.7	0.8	3.6
Stephanie Talbot	37	10	16.2	.395	.260	.690	2.7	2.1	0.5	0.5	1.0	1.4	3.5
Crystal Dangerfield ^{≠}	18	5	12.8	.286	.308	.667	1.0	2.0	0.4	0.2	0.9	0.7	3.3
Queen Egbo ^{≠} ^{‡}	2	0	2.0	1.000	—	—	1.5	0.0	0.5	0.0	0.0	0.5	1.0

^{‡}Waived/Released during the season
^{†}Traded during the season
^{≠}Acquired during the season

== Awards and honors ==
Recipient	Award	Date awarded	Ref.
Dearica Hamby	Western Conference Player of the Week	June 11, 2024	
Dearica Hamby	WNBA All-Star	July 2, 2024	
Dearica Hamby	AP Most Improved Player	September 22, 2024	
Dearica Hamby	Kim Perrot Sportsmanship Award	October 2, 2024	
Rickea Jackson	AP All-Rookie Team	September 22, 2024	
Rickea Jackson	WNBA All-Rookie Team	October 3, 2024	
