= Ivana Dojkić =

Croatian basketball player (born 1997)

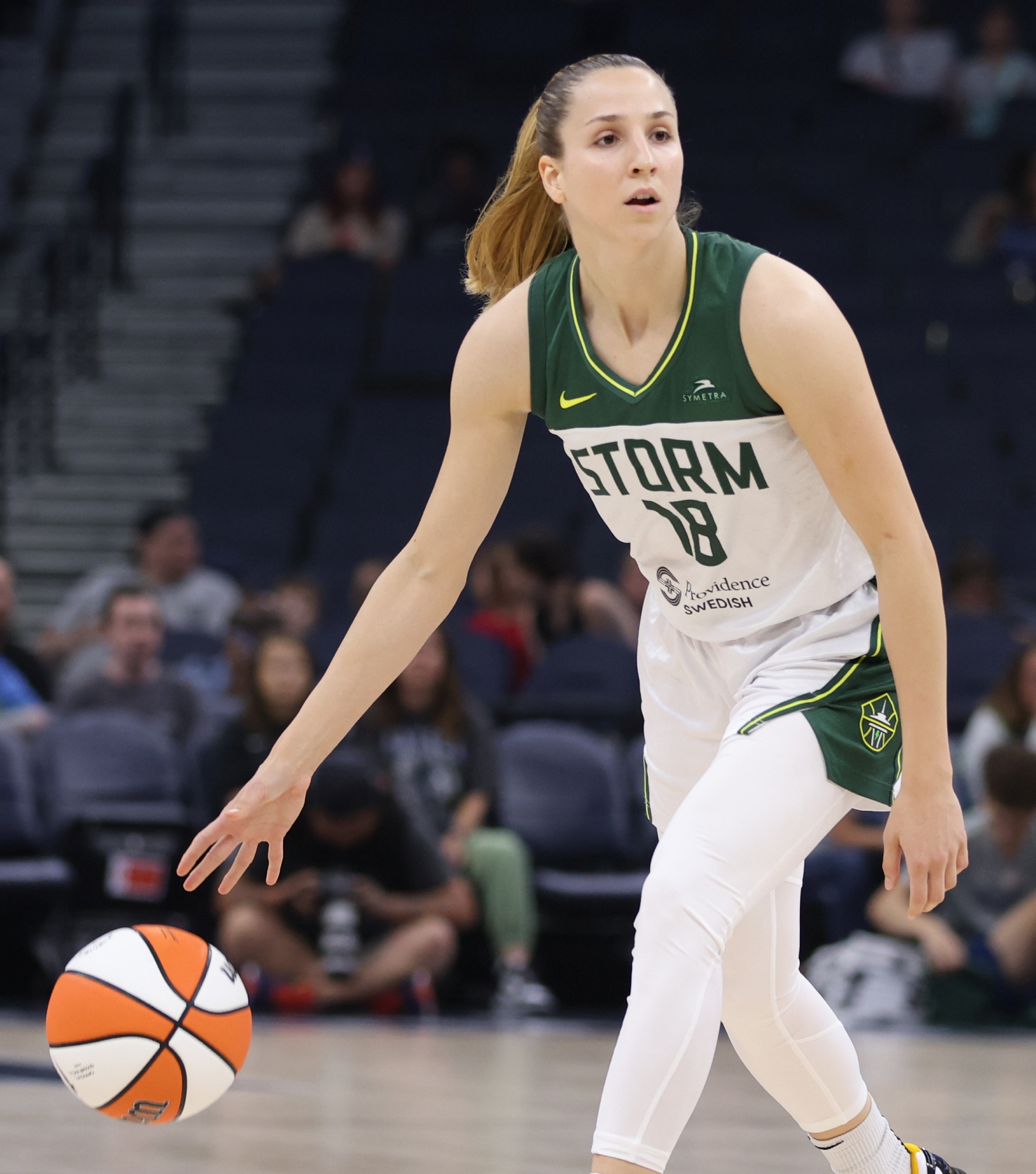
- Dojkić with the Seattle Storm in 2023

No. 18 – Reyer Venezia
- Position: Shooting guard
- League: Lega Basket Femminile

Personal information
- Born: December 24, 1997 (age 28) Rijeka, Croatia
- Listed height: 1.80 m (5 ft 11 in)
- Listed weight: 70 kg (154 lb)

Career information
- Playing career: 2010–present

Career history
- 2010–2011: Trešnjevka 2009
- 2011–2014: Novi Zagreb
- 2014–2016: Athlete Celje
- 2016–2018: Spartak Moscow Region
- 2019–2020: Atomerőmű KSC Szekszard
- 2020–2021: USK Praha
- 2021–2024: Virtus Bologna
- 2023: Seattle Storm
- 2024: New York Liberty
- 2024–2025: Famila Basket Schio
- 2025–present: Reyer Venezia

Career highlights
- WNBA champion (2024)
- Stats at Basketball Reference

Ivana Dojkić (born 24 December 1997) is a Croatian professional basketball player for Reyer Venezia of the Lega Basket Femminile. She previously played for the New York Liberty and the Seattle Storm in the Women's National Basketball Association (WNBA).

== Professional career ==
=== WNBA ===
Dojkić signed a rookie contract with the Seattle Storm during the offseason prior to the 2023 WNBA season. On August 10, 2023, Dojkić and the Storm parted ways and the Storm released her. She signed a training camp contract with the New York Liberty in February 2024. Dojkić came off the bench as a guard and had an expanded role during the absence of point guard Courtney Vandersloot during the regular season. For the first time in the team's history, the Liberty won the WNBA Championship in October 2024.

Following the 2024 season, Dojkić was a reserved free agent; the Liberty extended her a qualifying offer in January 2025. She did not sign a contract, instead completing the championship season with PF Schio in Italy's Lega Basket Femminile.

== Career statistics ==
Legend
GP	Games played	GS	Games started	MPG	Minutes per game	RPG	Rebounds per game
APG	Assists per game	SPG	Steals per game	BPG	Blocks per game	PPG	Points per game
TO	Turnovers per game	FG%	Field-goal percentage	3P%	3-point field-goal percentage	FT%	Free-throw percentage
**Bold**	Career best	°	League leader

†	Denotes season(s) in which Dojkić won a WNBA championship

=== WNBA ===
==== Regular season ====
Stats current through end of 2024 season

WNBA regular season statistics
Year	Team	GP	GS	MPG	FG%	3P%	FT%	RPG	APG	SPG	BPG	TO	PPG
2023	Seattle	23	**15**	**20.0**	**.403**	**.418**	.721	**1.7**	**2.8**	**0.8**	**0.2**	1.5	**6.5**
2024^{†}	New York	**26**	0	9.9	.338	.381	**.778**	0.8	0.8	0.3	0.0	**0.5**	3.3
**Career**	2 years, 2 teams	49	15	14.7	.378	.402	.743	1.3	1.7	0.6	0.1	1.0	4.8

==== Playoffs ====
WNBA playoff statistics
Year	Team	GP	GS	MPG	FG%	3P%	FT%	RPG	APG	SPG	BPG	TO	PPG
2024^{†}	New York	2	0	4.0	.500	1.000°	—	0.0	0.0	0.0	0.0	0.0	1.5
**Career**	1 year, 1 team	2	0	4.0	.500	1.000	—	0.0	0.0	0.0	0.0	0.0	1.5
