= 2024 Chicago Sky season =

- Head coach: Teresa Weatherspoon
- Arena: Wintrust Arena

Results
- Record: 13–27 (.325)
- Place: 6th (Eastern)
- Playoff finish: Did not qualify

The 2024 Chicago Sky season was the franchise's 19th season in the Women's National Basketball Association, and their first season under head coach Teresa Weatherspoon.

The offseason was marked by major coaching and roster changes. In October 2023, the team hired Weatherspoon as head coach, replacing interim head coach Emre Vatansever. The team also hired Jeff Pagliocca as general manager, separating this role from the head coaching position for the first time. Several starting players from previous seasons including Kahleah Copper, Alanna Smith, Courtney Williams, Astou Ndour-Fall, and Julie Allemand departed in free agency and trades. The Sky signed their own former first-round draft pick Diamond DeShields. Acquiring the 3rd and 7th picks in the 2024 WNBA draft through trades, they drafted high-profile college stars Kamilla Cardoso and Angel Reese.

The season tipped-off on Wednesday, May 15, 2024, against the Dallas Wings in Dallas. Despite preseason predictions that they would be among the league's worst teams, the Sky had a promising start to the season with a 3–3 record in May, including a stunning win, 90–81, over the New York Liberty. In the 9th game of the season, a 79–71 win over the Washington Mystics, starter Elizabeth Williams suffered a season-ending knee injury. Cardoso, who herself had suffered a shoulder injury during the preseason and missed the first six games of the season, was slotted into the starting lineup to play alongside another rookie, Reese. In the first half of June, the Sky consistently struggled with bad starts to games. After the 12th game of the season, an 81–83 loss at Washington, their third loss in a row, Lindsay Allen and Chennedy Carter replaced Dana Evans and Diamond DeShields in the starting lineup. The Sky's performances improved with the new lineup and it stayed intact until the WNBA break for the 2024 Paris Olympics. In the last game before the break, Chicago scored another surprising win, 93–85, against the reigning champions Las Vegas Aces, and entered the Olympic break in eighth place with a 10–14 record. The following day, Chicago traded Marina Mabrey and the team's second round pick in the 2025 WNBA draft to the Connecticut Sun in exchange for Rachel Banham, Moriah Jefferson, the Sun's first-round 2025 draft pick, and the rights to swap 2026 first-round draft picks.

After the break, Michaela Onyenwere entered the starting lineup in Mabrey's place. However, the Sky struggled with poor form and the unavailability of key players, posting a 3–13 record in August and September. Their top scorer, Carter, missed several games due to illness, and later due to a foot injury. Other injuries to Reese (broken wrist), DeShields (sprained ankle), and Cardoso (shoulder pain) forced significant changes in the rotation. The Sky were still in running for the last playoff spot until the final day of the season; however, they finished with a five-game losing streak and ultimately missed the playoffs, finishing in 10th place with a 13–27 record. Nonetheless, Chicago set a franchise record for average attendance, drawing 8,757 fans per game.

After the season, Chicago fired Weatherspoon.

== Transactions ==
=== WNBA draft ===
Round	Pick	Player	Nationality	School/Team/Country
1	3	Kamilla Cardoso	Brazil	South Carolina
1	7	Angel Reese	United States	LSU
2	13	Brynna Maxwell	United States	Gonzaga

=== Transactions ===
Date	Transaction
October 31, 2023	Hired Jeff Pagliocca as General Manager
January 17, 2024	Extended Qualifying Offers to Robyn Parks, Rebekah Gardner, and Morgan Bertsch
February 1. 2024	Signed Lindsay Allen
February 2, 2024	Renounced the rights to Astou Ndour-Fall
February 5, 2024	Signed Diamond DeShields
February 6, 2024	Acquired Brianna Turner and Michaela Onyenwere, the third overall pick in the 2024 WNBA draft, Chicago's own 2025 second round pick, Phoenix's 2026 first round draft pick, and the right to swap 2026 second round picks in exchange for Kahleah Copper and the rights to Morgan Bertsch.
February 8, 2024	Signed Taya Reimer to a Training Camp Contract
February 8, 2024	Signed Kysre Gondrezick to a Training Camp Contract
February 9, 2024	Signed Chennedy Carter to a Training Camp Contract
February 15, 2024	Renounced the rights to Kseniya Malashka
February 19, 2024	Acquired the 8th pick in the 2024 Draft in exchange for Julie Allemand and the rights to Li Yueru
March 14, 2024	Acquired the New York Liberty's 2025 and 2026 second round picks in exchange for the rights to Rebekah Gardner
April 14, 2024	Acquired the Minnesota Lynx 7th pick in the 2024 WNBA Draft and the rights to Nikolina Milić in exchange for Sika Koné, the 8th pick, the Sky's 2025 second round pick, and the rights to swap first round picks in the 2026 draft.
April 19, 2024	Signed Kamilla Cardoso, Angel Reese, and Brynna Maxwell to Rookie Contracts
April 19, 2024	Renounced the rights to Robyn Parks
May 10, 2024	Waived Taya Reimer
May 13, 2024	Waived Brynna Maxwell
June 28, 2024	Waived Kysre Gondrezick
July 17, 2024	Traded Marina Mabrey and the team's second round pick in the 2025 WNBA draft to Connecticut Sun in exchange for Rachel Banham, Moriah Jefferson, the Sun's first-round 2025 draft pick, and the rights to swap 2026 first-round draft picks
September 11, 2024	Signed Kaela Davis to 7-day contract
September 18, 2024	Released Kaela Davis and signed to rest-of-season contract
September 19, 2024	Signed Elizabeth Williams to an extension through 2025

=== Roster changes ===
==== Additions ====
Personnel	Reason	Former team
Lindsay Allen	Signed	Minnesota Lynx
Rachel Banham	Trade	Connecticut Sun
Kamilla Cardoso	Draft	South Carolina
Chennedy Carter	Signed	Free Agent
Diamond DeShields	Signed	Dallas Wings
Isabelle Harrison	Return from Injury	Chicago Sky
Moriah Jefferson	Trade	Connecticut Sun
Nikolina Milić	Trade	Minnesota Lynx
Michaela Onyenwere	Trade	Phoenix Mercury
Angel Reese	Draft	LSU
Brianna Turner	Trade	Phoenix Mercury

==== Subtractions ====
Personnel	Reason	New team
Morgan Bertsch	Trade	Phoenix Mercury
Kahleah Copper	Trade	Phoenix Mercury
Rebekah Gardner	Trade	New York Liberty
Ruthy Hebard	Free Agency	Minnesota Lynx
Sika Koné	Trade	Minnesota Lynx
Marina Mabrey	Trade	Connecticut Sun
Astou Ndour-Fall	Free Agency	Connecticut Sun
Robyn Parks	Renounced Rights	—
Alanna Smith	Free Agency	Minnesota Lynx
Taylor Soule	Free Agency	Minnesota Lynx
Courtney Williams	Free Agency	Minnesota Lynx

== Roster ==
2024 Chicago Sky roster
Players
Coaches

Pos.	No.	Nat.	Name	Height	Weight	DOB	From	Yrs
G	15	(United States)	Allen, Lindsay	5' 8" (1.73m)	145 lb (66kg)	1995-03-20	Notre Dame	6
G	24	(United States)	Banham, Rachel	5' 9" (1.75m)	175 lb (79kg)	1993-07-15	Minnesota	8
C	10	(Brazil)	Cardoso, Kamilla (injured)	6' 7" (2.01m)	215 lb (98kg)	2001-04-30	South Carolina	R
G	7	(United States)	Carter, Chennedy (injured)	5' 9" (1.75m)	143 lb (65kg)	1998-11-14	Texas A&M	3
F	33	(United States)	Davis, Kaela	6' 2" (1.88m)	180 lb (82kg)	1995-03-15	South Carolina	5
G	0	(United States)	DeShields, Diamond (injured)	6' 1" (1.85m)	172 lb (78kg)	1995-03-05	Tennessee	5
G	11	(United States)	Evans, Dana	5' 6" (1.68m)	145 lb (66kg)	1998-08-01	Louisville	3
F	20	(United States)	Harrison, Isabelle	6' 3" (1.91m)	183 lb (83kg)	1993-09-27	Tennessee	6
G	4	(United States)	Jefferson, Moriah	5' 6" (1.68m)	123 lb (56kg)	1994-03-08	Connecticut	7
F	12	(United States)	Onyenwere, Michaela	6' 0" (1.83m)	178 lb (81kg)	1999-08-10	UCLA	3
F	5	(United States)	Reese, Angel (injured)	6' 3" (1.91m)	165 lb (75kg)	2002-05-06	LSU	R
F	21	(United States)	Turner, Brianna	6' 3" (1.91m)	170 lb (77kg)	1996-07-05	Notre Dame	5
C	1	(United States)	Williams, Elizabeth (injured)	6' 3" (1.91m)	200 lb (91kg)	1993-06-23	Duke	9

Head coach
(United States) Teresa Weatherspoon (Louisiana Tech)
Assistant coaches
(United States) Crystal Robinson (SE Oklahoma State)
(United States) Sydney Johnson (Princeton)
(United States) Tamera Young (James Madison)
Athletic trainer
(United States) Meghan Lockerby
Strength and conditioning coach
(United States) Ann Crosby (Western Michigan)

Legend

- (C) Team captain
- (DP) Unsigned draft pick
- (FA) Free agent
- (S) Suspended
- Injured

=== Depth chart ===
Pos.	Starter	Bench
PG	Lindsay Allen	Moriah Jefferson
SG	Chennedy Carter	Rachel Banham; Dana Evans
SF	Diamond DeShields	Michaela Onyenwere
PF	Angel Reese	Isabelle Harrison; Brianna Turner
C	Elizabeth Williams	Kamilla Cardoso

== Schedule ==
=== Pre-season ===
2024 game log
Total: 1–1 (Home: 1–0; Road: 0–1)
May: 1–1 (Home: 1–0; Road: 0–1)

Game	Date	Team	Score	High points	High rebounds	High assists	Location Attendance	Record
1	May 3	@ Minnesota	L 81–92	Lindsay Allen (17)	Angel Reese (9)	Lindsay Allen (3)	Target Center; 7,010	0–1
2	May 7	New York	W 101–52	Marina Mabrey (20)	Brianna Turner (8)	Dana Evans (7)	Wintrust Arena; 3,132	1–1

2024 season schedule

=== Regular season ===
2024 game log
Total: 13–27 (Home: 6–14; Road: 7–13)
May: 3–3 (Home: 1–2; Road: 2–1)

Game	Date	Team	Score	High points	High rebounds	High assists	Location Attendance	Record
1	May 15	@ Dallas	L 79–87	Marina Mabrey (19)	Marina Mabrey (9)	Dana Evans (6)	College Park Center; 6,251	0–1
2	May 18	@ Dallas	W 83–74	Diamond DeShields (16)	Elizabeth Williams (10)	Marina Mabrey (8)	College Park Center; 6,251	1–1
3	May 23	@ New York	W 90–81	Marina Mabrey (21)	Angel Reese (9)	Marina Mabrey (7)	Barclays Center; 12,049	2–1
4	May 25	Connecticut	L 82–82	Marina Mabrey (23)	Mabrey, Reese, Williams (5)	Diamond DeShields (5)	Wintrust Arena; 9,025	2–2
5	May 28	Seattle	L 68–77	Dana Evans (13)	Angel Reese (12)	Allen, Evans (4)	Wintrust Arena; 7,807	2–3
6	May 30	Los Angeles	W 83–73	Marina Mabrey (20)	Elizabeth Williams (11)	Marina Mabrey (7)	Wintrust Arena; 7,911	3–3

June : 3–8 (Home: 2–5; Road: 1–3)

Game	Date	Team	Score	High points	High rebounds	High assists	Location Attendance	Record
7	June 1	@ Indiana	L 70–71	Chennedy Carter (19)	Angel Reese (13)	Chennedy Carter (6)	Gainbridge Fieldhouse; 17,274	3–4
8	June 4	New York	L 75–88	Chennedy Carter (16)	Angel Reese (10)	Marina Mabrey (5)	Wintrust Arena; 8,277	3–5
9	June 6	@ Washington	W 79–71	Chennedy Carter (25)	Angel Reese (11)	Dana Evans (4)	Capital One Arena; 10,000	4–5
10	June 8	Atlanta	L 80–89	Cardoso, Evans, Reese (13)	Angel Reese (13)	Dana Evans (5)	Wintrust Arena; 8,804	4–6
11	June 12	Connecticut	L 75–83	Angel Reese (20)	Angel Reese (10)	Evans, Mabrey (5)	Wintrust Arena; 7,815	4–7
12	June 14	@ Washington	L 81–83	Chennedy Carter (16)	Angel Reese (14)	Allen, Mabrey (3)	Entertainment and Sports Arena; 4,200	4–8
13	June 16	@ Indiana	L 83–91	Marina Mabrey (22)	Angel Reese (13)	Angel Reese (5)	Gainbridge Fieldhouse; 17,274	4–9
14	June 20	Dallas	W 83–72	Carter, Mabrey (19)	Angel Reese (18)	Allen, Evans, Mabrey (4)	Wintrust Arena; 9,025	5–9
15	June 23	Indiana	W 88–87	Angel Reese (25)	Angel Reese (16)	Lindsay Allen (7)	Wintrust Arena; 9,872	6–9
16	June 27	Las Vegas	L 83–95	Marina Mabrey (21)	Angel Reese (11)	Lindsay Allen (5)	Wintrust Arena; 9,025	6–10
17	June 30	Minnesota	L 62–70	Chennedy Carter (15)	Angel Reese (16)	Lindsay Allen (7)	Wintrust Arena; 9,025	6–11

July : 4–3 (Home: 1–1; Road: 3–2)

Game	Date	Team	Score	High points	High rebounds	High assists	Location Attendance	Record
18	July 2	@ Atlanta	W 85–77	Chennedy Carter (26)	Angel Reese (19)	Carter, Mabrey (4)	Gateway Center Arena; 3,260	7–11
19	July 5	@ Seattle	W 88–84	Chennedy Carter (33)	Angel Reese (10)	Marina Mabrey (7)	Climate Pledge Arena; 10,725	8–11
20	July 7	@ Seattle	L 71–84	Chennedy Carter (21)	Angel Reese (14)	Allen, Mabrey (6)	Climate Pledge Arena; 11,283	8–12
21	July 10	Atlanta	W 78–69	Chennedy Carter (19)	Angel Reese (13)	Carter, Mabrey (5)	Wintrust Arena; 9,025	9–12
22	July 11	@ New York	L 76–91	Chennedy Carter (22)	Isabelle Harrison (12)	Lindsay Allen (7)	Barclays Center; 17,758	9–13
23	July 13	New York	L 67–81	Marina Mabrey (21)	Angel Reese (16)	Marina Mabrey (7)	Wintrust Arena; 9,025	9–14
24	July 16	@ Las Vegas	W 93–85	Chennedy Carter (34)	Angel Reese (10)	Allen, Mabrey (4)	Michelob Ultra Arena; 10,396	10–14

August : 1–6 (Home: 0–4; Road: 1–2)

Game	Date	Team	Score	High points	High rebounds	High assists	Location Attendance	Record
25	August 15	Phoenix	L 65–85	Dana Evans (14)	Angel Reese (15)	Lindsay Allen (6)	Wintrust Arena; 9,025	10–15
26	August 17	@ Los Angeles	W 90–86	Lindsay Allen (16)	Kamilla Cardoso (14)	Lindsay Allen (6)	Crypto.com Arena; 16,551	11–15
27	August 18	@ Phoenix	L 68–86	Angel Reese (19)	Angel Reese (20)	Chennedy Carter (6)	Footprint Center; 14,267	11–16
28	August 23	@ Connecticut	L 80–82	Chennedy Carter (19)	Angel Reese (20)	Lindsay Allen (6)	Mohegan Sun Arena; 8,910	11–17
29	August 25	Las Vegas	L 75–77	Chennedy Carter (25)	Angel Reese (22)	Lindsay Allen (5)	Wintrust Arena; 9,025	11–18
30	August 28	Washington	L 70–74	Michaela Onyenwere (15)	Angel Reese (14)	Kamilla Cardoso (6)	Wintrust Arena; 8,763	11–19
31	August 30	Indiana	L 81–100	Michaela Onyenwere (20)	Angel Reese (11)	Lindsay Allen (6)	Wintrust Arena; 9,445	11–20

September : 2–7 (Home: 2–2; Road: 0–5)

Game	Date	Team	Score	High points	High rebounds	High assists	Location Attendance	Record
32	September 1	@ Minnesota	L 74–79	Kamilla Cardoso (22)	Angel Reese (19)	Lindsay Allen (6)	Target Center; 8,421	11–21
33	September 3	@ Las Vegas	L 71–90	Michaela Onyenwere (15)	Angel Reese (16)	3 players (3)	T-Mobile Arena; 18,394	11–22
34	September 6	Los Angeles	W 92–78	Angel Reese (24)	Angel Reese (12)	Chennedy Carter (7)	Wintrust Arena; 9,025	12–22
35	September 8	Dallas	W 92–77	Chennedy Carter (28)	Kamilla Cardoso (11)	Chennedy Carter (6)	Wintrust Arena; 8,704	13–22
36	September 11	Washington	L 58–89	Chennedy Carter (16)	Cardoso, Harrison (8)	Lindsay Allen (5)	Wintrust Arena; 7,948	13–23
37	September 13	@ Minnesota	L 66–83	Chennedy Carter (17)	Kamilla Cardoso (10)	Allen, Carter (5)	Target Center; 8,810	13–24
38	September 15	Phoenix	L 88–93	Chennedy Carter (20)	Michaela Onyenwere (9)	Allen, Banham (7)	Wintrust Arena; 8,577	13–25
39	September 17	@ Atlanta	L 70–86	Rachel Banham (22)	Isabelle Harrison (11)	Lindsay Allen (4)	Gateway Center Arena; 3,335	13–26
40	September 19	@ Connecticut	L 54–87	Isabelle Harrison (13)	Isabelle Harrison (11)	Lindsay Allen (5)	Mohegan Sun Arena; 8,092	13–27

2024 season schedule

== Standings ==
#	Team	W	L	PCT	GB	Conf.	Home	Road	Cup
1	yx – New York Liberty	32	8	.800	—	16–4	16–4	16–4	5–0
2	cx – Minnesota Lynx	30	10	.750	2	14–6	16–4	14–6	4–1
3	x – Connecticut Sun	28	12	.700	4	14–6	14–6	14–6	4–1
4	x – Las Vegas Aces	27	13	.675	5	12–8	13–7	14–6	2–3
5	x – Seattle Storm	25	15	.625	7	13–7	14–6	11–9	4–1
6	x – Indiana Fever	20	20	.500	12	11–9	12–8	8–12	3–2
7	x – Phoenix Mercury	19	21	.475	13	10–10	10–10	9–11	3–2
8	x – Atlanta Dream	15	25	.375	17	7–13	8–12	7–13	1–4
9	e – Washington Mystics	14	26	.350	18	7–13	5–15	9–11	1–4
10	e – Chicago Sky	13	27	.325	19	5–15	6–14	7–13	1–4
11	e – Dallas Wings	9	31	.225	23	6–14	7–13	2–18	0–5
12	e – Los Angeles Sparks	8	32	.200	24	5–15	5–15	3–17	2–3

Notes

(#) – League Standing
c – Commissioner's Cup winners
y – Regular Season Champion
x – Clinched playoff berth
e – Eliminated from playoff contention
Source: Overall standings and Commissioner's Cup Standings

== Statistics ==
Legend
GP	Games played	GS	Games started	MPG	Minutes per game	RPG	Rebounds per game
APG	Assists per game	SPG	Steals per game	BPG	Blocks per game	PPG	Points per game
FG%	Field-goal percentage	3P%	3-point field-goal percentage	FT%	Free-throw percentage	TO	Turnovers per game
PF	Fouls per game		Team leader		League leader

=== Regular season ===
Player	GP	GS	MPG	FG%	3P%	FT%	RPG	APG	SPG	BPG	TO	PF	PPG
Chennedy Carter	33	20	26.0	.487	.290	.730	3.5	3.1	1.1	0.2	1.7	3.2	17.5
Marina Mabrey ^{†}	24	24	33.2	.381	.350	.723	4.9	4.5	1.2	0.3	2.8	2.7	14.0
Angel Reese	34	34	32.5	.391	.188	.736	13.1	1.9	1.3	0.5	2.2	3.5	13.6
Elizabeth Williams	9	9	27.7	.487	—	.667	7.0	1.6	1.7	1.7	1.7	2.1	10.0
Kamilla Cardoso	32	29	27.4	.521	—	.726	7.9	1.7	0.5	1.4	1.5	3.2	9.8
Dana Evans	39	12	19.1	.377	.376	.960	1.1	2.4	0.7	0.1	1.4	1.2	7.2
Rachel Banham ^{≠}	16	9	19.8	.346	.382	.700	1.8	1.6	0.4	0.1	0.6	1.7	6.9
Lindsay Allen	40	28	23.8	.466	.292	.808	2.0	3.9	0.8	0.2	1.6	1.7	6.6
Michaela Onyenwere	34	18	18.7	.415	.368	.610	1.8	1.0	0.6	0.4	1.3	2.0	6.6
Isabelle Harrison	36	5	16.3	.399	.167	.820	3.9	0.8	0.6	0.3	1.1	1.3	6.5
Diamond DeShields	32	10	13.8	.348	.173	.611	1.4	1.3	0.6	0.3	0.9	1.6	4.5
Kaela Davis ^{≠}	4	0	13.0	.333	1.000	.500	1.0	0.3	0.3	0.5	1.0	1.3	3.0
Brianna Turner	27	2	9.4	.615	—	.500	2.0	0.4	0.3	0.5	0.4	1.0	1.2
Kysre Gondrezick ^{‡}	5	0	3.2	.286	.167	—	0.4	0.4	0.8	0.0	0.6	0.4	1.0
Moriah Jefferson ^{≠}	14	0	8.9	.115	.100	.833	0.5	1.7	0.1	0.0	0.4	0.6	0.9

^{‡}Waived/Released during the season
^{†}Traded during the season
^{≠}Acquired during the season

== Awards and honors ==
Recipient	Award	Date awarded	Ref.
Angel Reese	WNBA Rookie of the Month – June	July 2, 2024	
Angel Reese	WNBA All-Star	July 2, 2024	
Angel Reese	Eastern Conference Player of the Week	July 9, 2024	
Angel Reese	Peak Performer: Rebounds	September 20, 2024	
Angel Reese	AP All-Rookie Team	September 22, 2024	
Angel Reese	WNBA All-Rookie Team	October 3, 2024	
Kamilla Cardoso	AP All-Rookie Team	September 22, 2024	
Kamilla Cardoso	WNBA All-Rookie Team	October 3, 2024	
