= Dana Evans =

American basketball player (born 1998)

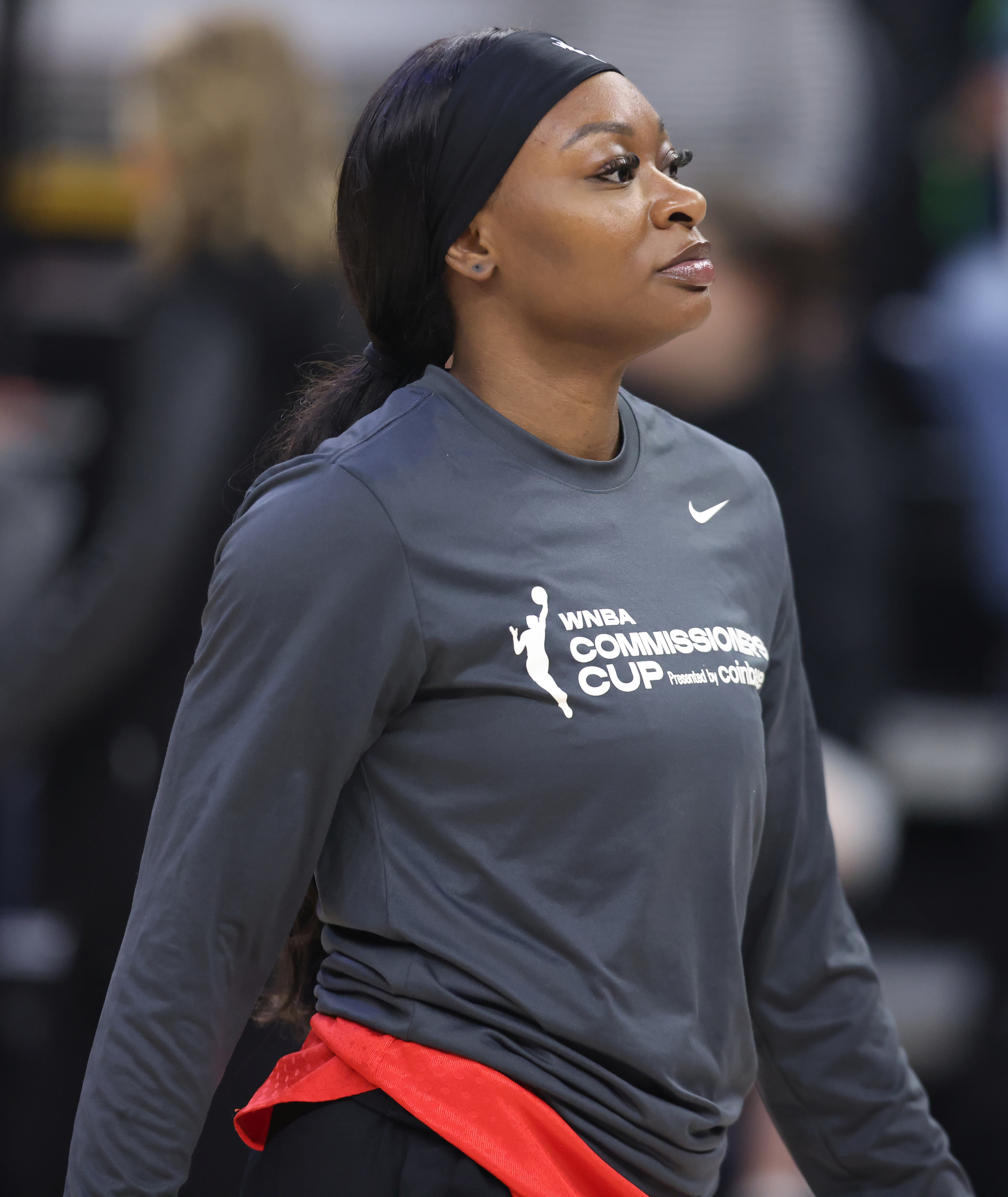
- Evans with the Las Vegas Aces in 2025

No. 11 – Las Vegas Aces
- Position: Point guard / shooting guard
- League: WNBA

Personal information
- Born: August 1, 1998 (age 28) Gary, Indiana, U.S.
- Listed height: 5 ft 6 in (1.68 m)
- Listed weight: 145 lb (66 kg)

Career information
- High school: West Side Leadership Academy (Gary, Indiana)
- College: Louisville (2017–2021)
- WNBA draft: 2021: 2nd round, 13th overall pick
- Drafted by: Dallas Wings
- Playing career: 2021–present

Career history
- 2021: Dallas Wings
- 2021–2024: Chicago Sky
- 2021: KSC Szekszárd
- 2022–2025: Beşiktaş
- 2025–present: Las Vegas Aces
- 2026–present: Phantom BC

Career highlights
- 2× WNBA champion (2021, 2025); WNBA All-Rookie Team (2021); First-team All-American – AP, USBWA (2021); Second-team All-American – AP, USBWA (2020); 2× WBCA All-American (2020, 2021); 2× ACC Player of the Year (2020, 2021); 2× First-team All-ACC (2020, 2021); ACC Sixth Player of the Year (2019); ACC All-Freshmen Team (2018); McDonald's All-American (2017)
- Stats at Basketball Reference
Medals
Representing United States
Women's basketball
FIBA Under-18 Americas Championship
Gold medal – first place	2016 Chile	Team

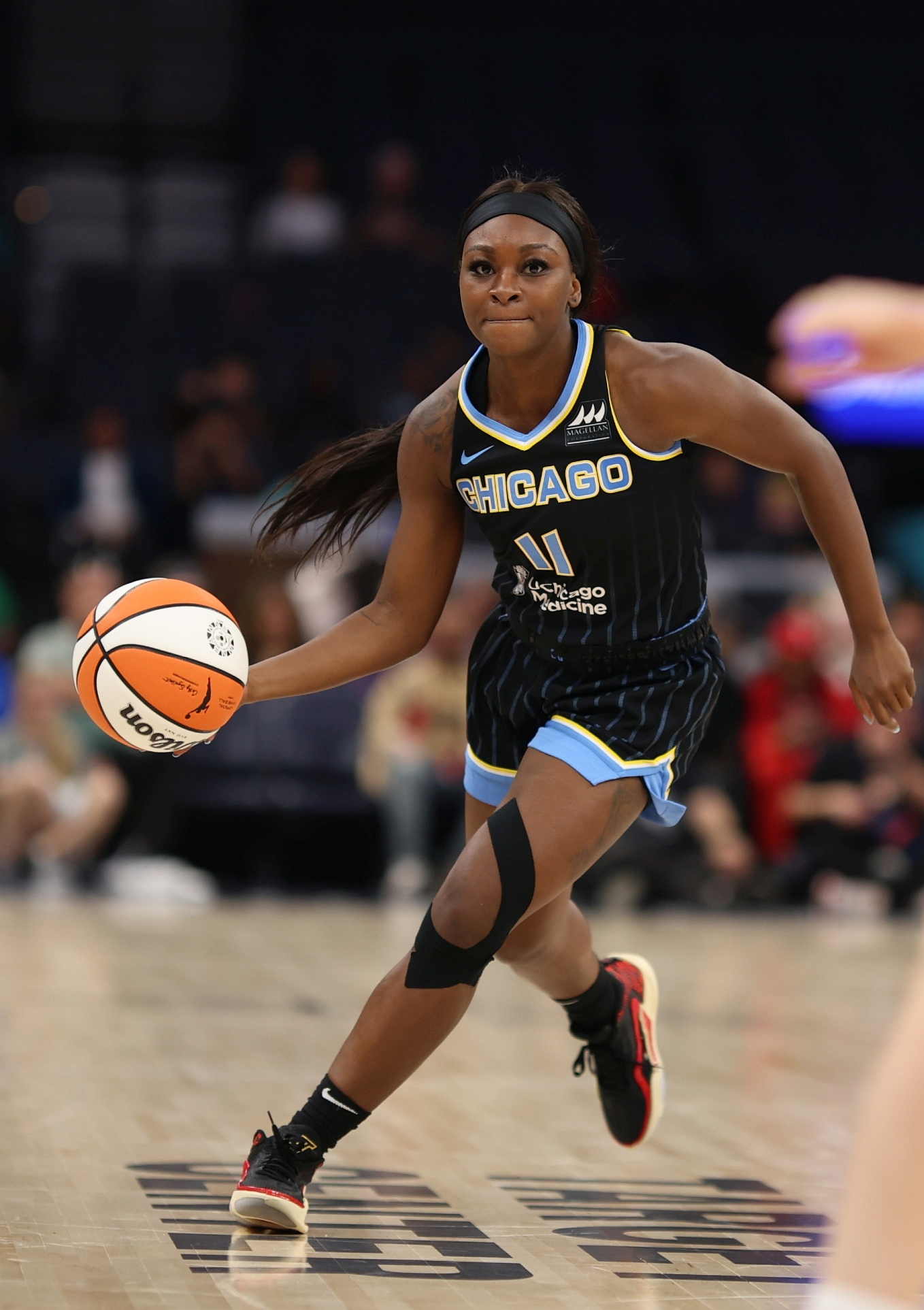
Evans with the Chicago Sky in 2023

Dana Kiana Evans (born August 1, 1998) is an American professional basketball player for the Las Vegas Aces of the Women's National Basketball Association and for the Phantom of Unrivaled. A two-time ACC Basketball Player of the Year at the University of Louisville, she was drafted by the Dallas Wings with the 13th overall pick of the 2021 WNBA draft.

== Early life ==
Evans grew up in Gary, Indiana, where although she did not play basketball until the fourth grade, she immediately excelled at it. She was praised for her skills on defense, and was said to have garnered an offer to play college basketball by Valparaiso head coach Keith Freeman in the sixth grade. The first girl from Gary to make it to the McDonald's All-American Game, Evans averaged over 35 points per game in her senior season, also winning three Class 4A sectional titles for West Side Leadership Academy.

== College career ==
One of the top recruits in college basketball, Evans committed to playing at Louisville, where she was named to the ACC All-Freshman team in 2018. In her sophomore year she was named the ACC sixth player of the year after averaging over 10 points per game off the bench.

Evans was named the ACC Player of the Year in 2020, the first player in ACC history to go from winning sixth player of the year to player of the year. She was also named the conference player of the year in 2021, the fourth consecutive season a player from the Louisville program was named the conference's top player.

== Professional career ==
=== WNBA ===
==== Dallas Wings (2021) ====
Evans was drafted by the Dallas Wings with the 13th overall pick of the 2021 WNBA draft. On June 2, 2021, Evans was traded to the Chicago Sky in exchange for Shyla Heal, the option to swap first-round picks with the Sky in the 2022 WNBA draft, and a 2022 third-round draft pick.

==== Chicago Sky (2021–2024) ====
With Chicago, Evans became the backup point guard for Courtney Vandersloot. Evans was named to the 2021 WNBA All-Rookie Team and won the 2021 championship with the Sky, who defeated the Phoenix Mercury 3–1 in the 2021 WNBA Finals.

In the 2022 WNBA season, Evans made her first career start in the season opener and recorded a new career-high 24 points. She returned to the bench for the remainder of the season and continued in her role as a backup point guard. However, her playing time diminished with the mid-season arrival of another point guard, Julie Allemand. The Sky failed to repeat their 2021 run, losing in the semifinals, 2–3, to the Connecticut Sun.

With the departure of several key players before the 2023 WNBA season, including starting point guard Vandersloot, Evans's role and playing time increased with the Sky. Although she did not assume the starting role, facing competition from new arrivals Courtney Williams and Marina Mabrey, her playing time nearly doubled, and she posted career-high averages in all statistical categories. The Sky made the playoffs as the eighth seed, but were swept in the first round by the eventual champions, the Las Vegas Aces.

Evans began the 2024 WNBA season as the starting point guard for the Sky. However, she lost her starting spot twelve games into the season and experienced inconsistent playing time throughout the rest of it. Due to her reduced role, Evans initiated trade talks before the Olympic break in July but ultimately stayed with the Sky for the rest of the season.

==== Las Vegas Aces (2025–present) ====
On February 7, 2025, Evans was traded to the Las Vegas Aces in exchange for the 16th and 22nd pick in the 2025 WNBA draft.

=== Unrivaled ===
On November 5, 2025, it was announced that Evans had been drafted by Phantom BC for the 2026 Unrivaled season.

=== Overseas ===
In winter 2021, Evans played for KSC Szekszárd in Hungary.

Since the 2022–2023 season, Evans has played for Beşiktaş of the Turkish Super League. She was the top scorer of the 2023–24 EuroCup Women and led her team to the finals, where they lost 145–149 on aggregate to the London Lions.

== Off the court ==
Evans is a Jordan Brand athlete, and designed her own player exclusive of the Jordan Tatum 2 which Jayson Tatum wore in the second game of the 2024 NBA Eastern Conference Finals.

== Career statistics ==
Legend
GP	Games played	GS	Games started	MPG	Minutes per game	RPG	Rebounds per game
APG	Assists per game	SPG	Steals per game	BPG	Blocks per game	PPG	Points per game
TO	Turnovers per game	FG%	Field-goal percentage	3P%	3-point field-goal percentage	FT%	Free-throw percentage
**Bold**	Career best	°	League leader

†	Denotes seasons in which Evans won a WNBA championship

=== WNBA ===
==== Regular season ====
WNBA regular season statistics
Year	Team	GP	GS	MPG	FG%	3P%	FT%	RPG	APG	SPG	BPG	TO	PPG
2021^{†}	Dallas	6	0	4.0	.342	.400	**1.000**	.4	1.0	.0	.0	.7	.8
2021^{†}	Chicago	23	0	8.6	.356	**.405**	.885	.5	1.2	.2	.0	**.6**	3.9
2022	Chicago	33	1	11.5	.377	.328	.880	.8	1.2	.3	**.1**	.8	4.3
2023	Chicago	39	1	**21.5**	.360	.294	.854	1.2	**3.0**	**.7**	**.1**	1.6	**9.0**
2024	Chicago	39	**12**	19.1	.377	.376	.960	1.1	2.4	**.7**	**.1**	1.4	7.2
2025^{†}	Las Vegas	**44**	1	17.7	**.389**	.366	.755	1.1	2.2	.4	**.1**	.8	6.6
2026	Las Vegas	14	1	15.3	.286	.387	.500	**1.4**	2.1	.2	**.1**	1.1	3.6
**Career**	6 years, 3 teams	198	16	16.0	.368	.347	.858	1.0	2.1	.4	.1	1.1	6.1

==== Playoffs ====
Playoff statistics
Year	Team	GP	GS	MPG	FG%	3P%	FT%	RPG	APG	SPG	BPG	TO	PPG
2021^{†}	Chicago	9	0	7.1	.313	.417	.000	.6	.2	.2	.0	.7	1.7
2022	Chicago	4	0	5.8	**.600**	**.600**	**1.000**	.8	.5	.5	.0	**.3**	4.3
2023	Chicago	2	0	**22.5**	.417	.400	**1.000**	.5	**3.5**	**1.5**	.0	1.0	**14.5**
2025^{†}	Las Vegas	**12**	0	19.7	.468	.533	**1.000**	1.0	2.9	.6	.0	1.0	8.4
2026	Las Vegas	2	0	22.0	.364	.500	**1.000**	**1.5**	2.0	1.0	.0	1.0	6.5
**Career**	5 years, 2 teams	29	0	14.2	.443	.475	1.000	.8	1.7	.6	.0	.8	6.0

=== College ===
NCAA statistics
Year	Team	GP	GS	MPG	FG%	3P%	FT%	RPG	APG	SPG	BPG	TO	PPG
2017–18	Louisville	**39**	1	21.0	.364	.224	.797	2.0	3.4	.1	1.1	1.8	5.1
2018–19	Louisville	36	5	25.9	.418	.385	.842	2.4	4.0	.0	**1.5**	1.8	10.4
2019–20	Louisville	30	29	**33.7**	.416	**.431**	**.890**	**2.8**	**4.2**	.0	.8	**2.5**	18.0
2020–21	Louisville	30	**30**	32.9	**.430**	.353	.873	2.7	3.9	.1	1.3	2.1	**20.1**°
**Career**		135	65	27.8	.414	.377	.858	2.4	3.9	.0	1.2	2.0	12.7
