= 2024 Minnesota Lynx season =

- Head coach: Cheryl Reeve
- Arena: Target Center

Results
- Record: 30–10 (.750)
- Place: 1st (Western)
- Playoff finish: 2nd seed; Lost in Finals 2–3 to New York

Media
- Television: Bally Sports North; ESPN; CBS Sports Network; ION; Amazon Prime Video

The 2024 Minnesota Lynx season was the 26th season for the Minnesota Lynx of the Women's National Basketball Association, and the fifteenth season under head coach Cheryl Reeve.

The season tipped-off on Tuesday, May 14, 2024, in Seattle against the Seattle Storm.

The Lynx went 4–1 in the WNBA Commissioner's Cup Western Conference standings, and clinched a spot in the Cup Final against the New York Liberty on June 13, 2024. This is the first time in the Lynx history that they represented the Western Conference in the Cup, since it started in 2021. Napheesa Collier was named MVP of the 2024 WNBA Commissioner's Cup Final, as the Lynx defeated the Liberty 94–89.

Cheryl Reeve was named the Coach of the Year and Napheesa Collier was named the Defensive Player of the Year on September 22, 2024. Collier was also named to the AP All-WNBA First team.

The Lynx wrapped the season having won 14 out of the 16 games after the Olympic break. The team had the highest number of assists per game and highest three-point shooting percentage in the league. A little over 76% of their baskets were done with an assist in the regular season. They finished the regular season with a 30–10 record and headed into the playoffs ranked second in the league.

The players have noted the early chemistry of the team even with several players added to the roster this season. Alanna Smith on this year's team: "We've all acknowledged that we've never been on a team quite like what we are now and it's kind of fitting we've drawn it out as long as possible, with both series' going to five games, because we don't want to leave each other," Smith laughs.

"We've all had so much fun playing together, it's been an absolute joy to be around this team, the coaches and staff. It's really rare to be a part of something like this and it's really rare to experience that and also win as well."

Seimone Augustus commented on the 2024 team chemistry and culture: "Every player kind of resembles one of the players from the original dynasty team, as far as their game and how they approach the game. Even their character, their personalities, I’m like, ‘We’re back, we’re back in the mix‘."

== Playoffs ==
In the postseason opener against the Phoenix Mercury at Target Center on September 22, 2024, the Lynx made playoff history by having seven players with 3+ assists. This had never happened in the playoffs and only happened six times in the regular season. The team also had the largest assist rate in WNBA playoffs history with 30 assists on 34 field goals made. The Lynx won over the Mercury with a score of 102–95. The Lynx swept the Mercury by winning the second game on September 25, 2024, with a score of 101–88, advancing to the semifinals against the Connecticut Sun. In these two games, the Lynx set the highest amount of assists on field goals made (FGM) with 58 assists on 68 FGM (85.3% of makes assisted on).

=== Semifinals ===
With the Lynx win against the Sun on October 8, 2024, in game 5 of the semifinals, the Lynx have the most postseason wins in WNBA history (with 48). In this same game, the Lynx set another league record by having three players in a postseason game have 16+ field goal attempts while shooting 50+%. The three Lynx players were Napheesa Collier, Courtney Williams, and Kayla McBride. The Lynx went to the finals for the seventh time, the most in WNBA history.

=== Finals ===
In Game 1 of the finals against the New York Liberty on October 10, 2024, the Lynx became the first WNBA team in postseason history to win after trailing by 15+ points in the final five minutes of regulation. The Lynx won in overtime 95–93. The Lynx also became the first team to win a WNBA finals game in overtime on the road. The trio of Napheesa Collier, Kayla McBride, and Courtney Williams became the first in Lynx history to each score 20+ points in a finals game. The game had the highest number of viewers of any WNBA Finals Game 1 with 1.1 million viewers and 1.5 million viewers at the peak.

== Transactions ==
=== WNBA draft ===
Round	Pick	Player	Nationality	School/Team/Country
1	8	Alissa Pili	United States	Utah
3	31	Kiki Jefferson	United States	Louisville

=== Transactions ===
Date	Transaction
December 11, 2023	Renounced the rights to Anna Cruz and Kelsey Griffin
January 12, 2024	Extended a Qualifying Offer to Nikolina Milić
January 31, 2024	Acquired Natisha Hiedeman in exchange for Tiffany Mitchell and the 19th pick in the 2024 draft
January 31, 2024	Suspended Jessica Shepard for the season due to Prioritization Rules
February 1, 2024	Signed Courtney Williams
February 1, 2024	Signed Alanna Smith
February 1, 2024	Re-signed Bridget Carleton
February 2, 2024	Signed Elizabeth Dixon to a Training Camp Contract
February 2, 2024	Signed Kayana Traylor to a Training Camp Contract
February 6, 2024	Signed Taylor Soule to a Training Camp Contract
February 13, 2024	Signed Jaime Nared to a Training Camp Contract
February 16, 2024	Signed Ruthy Hebard to a Training Camp Contract
March 4, 2024	Signed Olivia Époupa to a Training Camp Contract
April 14, 2024	Acquired Sika Koné, the eighth pick in the 2024 draft, the Chicago Sky's 2025 second-round pick, and the rights to swap first-round picks with Chicago in the 2026 draft in exchange for the seventh pick in the 2024 draft and Nikolina Milić.
April 19, 2024	Signed Cecilia Zandalasini to a Training Camp Contract
April 19, 2024	Waived Elizabeth Dixon
April 23, 2024	Signed Camryn Taylor to a Training Camp Contract
April 23, 2024	Signed Mimi Collins to a Training Camp Contract
April 23, 2024	Signed Quinesha Lockett to a Training Camp Contract
May 5, 2024	Waived Mimi Collins and Jaime Nared
May 9, 2024	Waived Ruthy Hebard, Kiki Jefferson, and Quinesha Lockett
May 11, 2024	Waived Camryn Taylor and Kayana Traylor
May 13, 2024	Suspended the contract of Dorka Juhász (temporary)
May 24, 2024	Activated Dorka Juhász
May 24, 2024	Waived Taylor Soule
August 20, 2024	Minnesota acquired Myisha Hines-Allen from the Washington Mystics in exchange for Olivia Époupa, Sika Koné, and a 2026 second-round pick.
September 19, 2024	Re-signed Olivia Époupa

=== Roster changes ===
==== Additions ====
Personnel	Signed/Trade	Former team
Olivia Époupa	Signed	—
Natisha Hiedeman	Trade	Connecticut Sun
Myisha Hines-Allen	Trade	Washington Mystics
Kiki Jefferson	Draft	Louisville
Sika Koné	Trade	Chicago Sky
Alissa Pili	Draft	Utah
Alanna Smith	Signed	Chicago Sky
Taylor Soule	Signed	Chicago Sky
Courtney Williams	Signed	Chicago Sky
Cecilia Zandalasini	Signed	—

==== Subtractions ====
Personnel	Reason	New team
Lindsay Allen	Free Agency	Chicago Sky
Rachel Banham	Free Agency	Connecticut Sun
Olivia Époupa	Trade	Washington Mystics
Sika Koné	Trade	Washington Mystics
Nikolina Milić	Trade	Chicago Sky
Kiki Jefferson	Waived	–
Tiffany Mitchell	Trade	Connecticut Sun
Aerial Powers	Free Agency	Atlanta Dream
Jessica Shepard	Prioritization Rules	—
Taylor Soule	Waived	—

== Roster ==
2024 Minnesota Lynx roster
Players
Coaches

Pos.	No.	Nat.	Name	Height	Weight	DOB	From	Yrs
G/F	6	(Canada)	Carleton, Bridget	6' 1" (1.85m)	190 lb (86kg)	1997-05-22	Iowa State	5
F	24	(United States)	Collier, Napheesa	6' 2" (1.88m)	185 lb (84kg)	1996-09-23	Connecticut	5
G	0	(France)	Époupa, Olivia	5' 5" (1.65m)	119 lb (54kg)	1994-04-30	France	R
G	2	(United States)	Hiedeman, Natisha	5' 8" (1.73m)	135 lb (61kg)	1997-02-10	Marquette	5
F	22	(United States)	Hines-Allen, Myisha	6' 1" (1.85m)	200 lb (91kg)	1996-05-30	Louisville	6
G/F	14	(Hungary)	Juhász, Dorka	6' 5" (1.96m)	192 lb (87kg)	1999-12-18	Connecticut	1
G	21	(United States)	McBride, Kayla	5' 10" (1.78m)	186 lb (84kg)	1992-06-25	Notre Dame	10
G	1	(United States)	Miller, Diamond	6' 3" (1.91m)	163 lb (74kg)	2001-02-11	Maryland	1
F	35	(United States)	Pili, Alissa	6' 2" (1.88m)	235 lb (107kg)	2001-06-08	Utah	R
F	8	(Australia)	Smith, Alanna	6' 4" (1.93m)	180 lb (82kg)	1996-09-10	Stanford	5
G	10	(United States)	Williams, Courtney	5' 8" (1.73m)	133 lb (60kg)	1994-05-11	South Florida	8
F	9	(Italy)	Zandalasini, Cecilia	6' 2" (1.88m)	175 lb (79kg)	1996-03-16	Italy	2
F		(France)	Hirsch, Maïa (DP)	6' 5" (1.96m)		2003-11-13	France

Head coach
(United States) Cheryl Reeve (La Salle)
Assistant coaches
(United States) Katie Smith (Ohio State)
(United States) Rebekkah Brunson (Georgetown)
(United States) Elaine Powell (LSU)
Athletic trainer
(United States) Chuck Barta (UW–La Crosse)
Assistant trainer
(United States) Brandi BlueArm (Minnesota State)

Legend

- (C) Team captain
- (DP) Unsigned draft pick
- (FA) Free agent
- (S) Suspended
- Injured

=== Depth ===
Pos.	Starter	Bench
PG	Courtney Williams	Natisha Hiedeman; Olivia Époupa
SG	Kayla McBride	Diamond Miller
SF	Bridget Carleton	Cecilia Zandalasini
PF	Napheesa Collier	Myisha Hines-Allen; Alissa Pili
C	Alanna Smith	Dorka Juhász

== Schedule ==
=== Pre-season ===
2024 pre-season game log
Total: 2–0 (Home: 1–0; Road: 1–0)
May: 2–0 (Home: 1–0; Road: 1–0)

Game	Date	Team	Score	High points	High rebounds	High assists	Location Attendance	Record
1	May 3	Chicago	W 92–81	Collier, Williams (17)	Époupa, Traylor (5)	Natisha Hiedeman (6)	Target Center; 7,010	1–0
2	May 8	@ Washington	W 83–77	Napheesa Collier (15)	Napheesa Collier (7)	Courtney Williams (6)	Entertainment and Sports Arena; 4,112	2–0

2024 pre-season schedule

=== Regular season ===
2024 game log
Total: 30–10 (Home: 16–4; Road: 14–6)
May: 5–2 (Home: 3–1; Road: 2–1)

Game	Date	Team	Score	High points	High rebounds	High assists	Location Attendance	Record
1	May 14	@ Seattle	W 83–70	Alanna Smith (22)	Napheesa Collier (12)	Courtney Williams (7)	Climate Pledge Arena; 8,508	1–0
2	May 17	Seattle	W 102–93 (2OT)	Napheesa Collier (29)	Napheesa Collier (9)	Natisha Hiedeman (7)	Target Center; 7,208	2–0
3	May 23	@ Connecticut	L 82–83 (OT)	Napheesa Collier (31)	Napheesa Collier (11)	Courtney Williams (6)	Mohegan Sun Arena; 6,152	2–1
4	May 25	New York	W 84–67	Smith, Collier (15)	Napheesa Collier (12)	McBride, Williams (5)	Target Center; 7,010	3–1
5	May 26	@ Atlanta	W 92–79	Kayla McBride (31)	Napheesa Collier (8)	Napheesa Collier (7)	Gateway Center Arena; 3,265	4–1
6	May 29	Las Vegas	L 66–80	Napheesa Collier (18)	Napheesa Collier (13)	Courtney Williams (8)	Target Center; 7,409	4–2
7	May 31	Phoenix	W 95–71	Alissa Pili (20)	Napheesa Collier (11)	Hiedeman, Williams (5)	Target Center; 7,035	5–2

June : 9–2 (Home: 6–0; Road: 3–2)

Game	Date	Team	Score	High points	High rebounds	High assists	Location Attendance	Record
8	June 2	Dallas	W 87–76	Kayla McBride (25)	Napheesa Collier (14)	Carleton, Collier, McBride (4)	Target Center; 7,024	6–2
9	June 5	@ Los Angeles	W 86–62	Napheesa Collier (25)	Napheesa Collier (9)	Hiedeman, Smith, Williams (4)	Crypto.com Arena; 8,104	7–2
10	June 7	@ Phoenix	L 80–81	Kayla McBride (25)	Napheesa Collier (12)	Collier, Smith (6)	Footprint Center; 9,052	7–3
11	June 9	Seattle	W 83–64	Kayla McBride (32)	Napheesa Collier (14)	Époupa, Smith (7)	Target Center; 7,121	8–3
12	June 11	@ Las Vegas	W 100–86	Alanna Smith (18)	Napheesa Collier (6)	Courtney Williams (9)	Michelob Ultra Arena; 10,368	9–3
13	June 14	Los Angeles	W 81–76	Napheesa Collier (30)	Courtney Williams (8)	Courtney Williams (10)	Target Center; 8,117	10–3
14	June 17	Dallas	W 90–78	Kayla McBride (19)	Alanna Smith (9)	Kayla McBride (7)	Target Center; 8,314	11–3
15	June 19	Atlanta	W 68–55	Napheesa Collier (16)	Dorka Juhász (11)	Courtney Williams (6)	Target Center; 8,206	12–3
16	June 22	Phoenix	W 73–60	Napheesa Collier (23)	Napheesa Collier (14)	Alanna Smith (5)	Target Center; 8,769	13–3
Commissioner's; Cup Final	June 25	New York	W 94–89	Bridget Carleton (23)	Collier, Smith (6)	Courtney Williams (8)	UBS Arena; 7,015	—
17	June 27	@ Dallas	L 88–94	Napheesa Collier (29)	Napheesa Collier (11)	Carleton, Collier, McBride, Smith, Williams (4)	College Park Center; 6,251	13–4
18	June 30	@ Chicago	W 70–62	Kayla McBride (16)	Napheesa Collier (11)	Napheesa Collier (6)	Wintrust Arena; 9,025	14–4

July : 3–4 (Home: 2–2; Road: 1–2)

Game	Date	Team	Score	High points	High rebounds	High assists	Location Attendance	Record
19	July 2	@ New York	L 67–76	Kayla McBride (17)	Napheesa Collier (10)	Collier, Smith (6)	Barclays Center; 10,846	14–5
20	July 4	Connecticut	L 73–78	Alanna Smith (14)	Kayla McBride (8)	Courtney Williams (6)	Target Center; 7,508	14–6
21	July 6	Washington	W 74–67	McBride, Williams (17)	Dorka Juhász (11)	Courtney Williams (7)	Target Center; 7,610	15–6
22	July 9	@ Los Angeles	W 82–67	Bridget Carleton (16)	Juhász, Smith (6)	Courtney Williams (5)	Crypto.com Arena; 9,533	16–6
23	July 12	@ Seattle	L 63–91	Kayla McBride (27)	Dorka Juhász (7)	Alanna Smith (5)	Climate Pledge Arena; 8,320	16–7
24	July 14	Indiana	L 74–81	Alanna Smith (18)	Alanna Smith (8)	Courtney Williams (7)	Target Center; 18,978	16–8
25	July 17	Atlanta	W 86–79	Kayla McBride (30)	Alanna Smith (10)	Courtney Williams (9)	Target Center; 15,013	17–8

August : 6–1 (Home: 3–0; Road: 3–1)

Game	Date	Team	Score	High points	High rebounds	High assists	Location Attendance	Record
26	August 15	Washington	W 79–68	Napheesa Collier (17)	Napheesa Collier (12)	Courtney Williams (5)	Target Center; 7,224	18–8
27	August 17	@ Washington	W 99–83	Napheesa Collier (30)	Smith, Williams (7)	Natisha Hiedeman (6)	Entertainment and Sports Arena; 4,200	19–8
28	August 21	@ Las Vegas	W 98–87	Napheesa Collier (23)	Collier, Williams (7)	Courtney Williams (10)	Michelob Ultra Arena; 10,429	20–8
29	August 23	Las Vegas	W 87–74	Napheesa Collier (27)	Napheesa Collier (18)	Napheesa Collier (5)	Target Center; 9,124	21–8
30	August 24	Indiana	W 90–80	Napheesa Collier (31)	Napheesa Collier (5)	Courtney Williams (6)	Target Center; 19,023	22–8
31	August 28	@ Phoenix	W 89–76	Kayla McBride (19)	Napheesa Collier (8)	Carleton, Collier, Williams (5)	Footprint Center; 9,482	23–8
32	August 30	@ Dallas	L 76–94	Napheesa Collier (17)	Napheesa Collier (10)	Napheesa Collier (5)	College Park Center; 5,581	23–9

September : 7–1 (Home: 2–1; Road: 5–0)

Game	Date	Team	Score	High points	High rebounds	High assists	Location Attendance	Record
33	September 1	Chicago	W 79–74	Courtney Williams (22)	Dorka Juhász (6)	Courtney Williams (6)	Target Center; 8,421	24–9
34	September 6	@ Indiana	W 99–88	Napheesa Collier (26)	Napheesa Collier (10)	Hines-Allen, Smith (5)	Gainbridge Fieldhouse; 17,274	25–9
35	September 8	@ Washington	W 78–71	Napheesa Collier (19)	Napheesa Collier (12)	Kayla McBride (4)	Entertainment and Sports Arena; 4,200	26–9
36	September 10	@ Atlanta	W 76–64	Kayla McBride (15)	Napheesa Collier (8)	Courtney Williams (7)	Gateway Center Arena; 3,260	27–9
37	September 13	Chicago	W 83–66	Napheesa Collier (20)	Alanna Smith (12)	Courtney Williams (10)	Target Center; 8,810	28–9
38	September 15	@ New York	W 88–79	Bridget Carleton (19)	Napheesa Collier (13)	Kayla McBride (6)	Barclays Center; 14,246	29–9
39	September 17	@ Connecticut	W 78–76	Napheesa Collier (25)	Kayla McBride (7)	Courtney Williams (12)	Mohegan Sun Arena; 8,174	30–9
40	September 19	Los Angeles	L 51–68	Miller, Pili (8)	Alanna Smith (8)	Hiedeman, Smith (3)	Target Center; 7,908	30–10

2024 season schedule

=== Playoffs ===
2024 playoff game log
First round vs. Phoenix Mercury
Won Series: 2–0

Game	Date	Team	Score	High points	High rebounds	High assists	Location Attendance	Series
1	September 22	Phoenix	W 102–95	Napheesa Collier (38)	3 players (6)	Courtney Williams (8)	Target Center; 8,524	1–0
2	September 25	Phoenix	W 101–88	Napheesa Collier (42)	Collier, Smith (5)	Natisha Hiedeman (7)	Target Center; 8,769	2–0

Semifinals vs. Connecticut Sun
Won Series: 3–2

Game	Date	Team	Score	High points	High rebounds	High assists	Location Attendance	Series
1	September 29	Connecticut	L 70–73	Napheesa Collier (19)	Napheesa Collier (9)	3 players (4)	Target Center; 8,506	0–1
2	October 1	Connecticut	W 74–70	Courtney Williams (17)	Napheesa Collier (12)	Napheesa Collier (5)	Target Center; 8,796	1–1
3	October 4	@ Connecticut	W 90–81	Napheesa Collier (26)	Napheesa Collier (11)	Courtney Williams (8)	Mohegan Sun Arena; 8,268	2–1
4	October 6	@ Connecticut	L 82–92	Napheesa Collier (29)	Napheesa Collier (13)	Kayla McBride (6)	Mohegan Sun Arena; 7,849	2–2
5	October 8	Connecticut	W 88-77	Napheesa Collier (27)	Napheesa Collier (11)	Courtney Williams (7)	Target Center; 8,769	3–2

Finals vs. New York Liberty
Lost Series: 2–3

Game	Date	Team	Score	High points	High rebounds	High assists	Location Attendance	Series
1	October 10	@ New York	W 95–93 (OT)	Courtney Williams (23)	Alanna Smith (9)	Courtney Williams (5)	Barclays Center; 17,732	1–0
2	October 13	@ New York	L 66–80	Napheesa Collier (16)	Napheesa Collier (8)	Courtney Williams (8)	Barclays Center; 18,046	1–1
3	October 16	New York	L 77–80	Napheesa Collier (22)	Napheesa Collier (9)	Courtney Williams (8)	Target Center; 19,521	1–2
4	October 18	New York	W 82–80	Kayla McBride (19)	Napheesa Collier (9)	Courtney Williams (7)	Target Center; 19,210	2–2
5	October 20	@ New York	L 62–67 (OT)	Napheesa Collier (22)	Alanna Smith (8)	Kayla McBride (5)	Barclays Center; 18,090	2–3

2024 playoff schedule

== Standings ==
#	Team	W	L	PCT	GB	Conf.	Home	Road	Cup
1	yx – New York Liberty	32	8	.800	—	16–4	16–4	16–4	5–0
2	cx – Minnesota Lynx	30	10	.750	2	14–6	16–4	14–6	4–1
3	x – Connecticut Sun	28	12	.700	4	14–6	14–6	14–6	4–1
4	x – Las Vegas Aces	27	13	.675	5	12–8	13–7	14–6	2–3
5	x – Seattle Storm	25	15	.625	7	13–7	14–6	11–9	4–1
6	x – Indiana Fever	20	20	.500	12	11–9	12–8	8–12	3–2
7	x – Phoenix Mercury	19	21	.475	13	10–10	10–10	9–11	3–2
8	x – Atlanta Dream	15	25	.375	17	7–13	8–12	7–13	1–4
9	e – Washington Mystics	14	26	.350	18	7–13	5–15	9–11	1–4
10	e – Chicago Sky	13	27	.325	19	5–15	6–14	7–13	1–4
11	e – Dallas Wings	9	31	.225	23	6–14	7–13	2–18	0–5
12	e – Los Angeles Sparks	8	32	.200	24	5–15	5–15	3–17	2–3

Notes

(#) – League Standing
c – Commissioner's Cup winners
y – Regular Season Champion
x – Clinched playoff berth
e – Eliminated from playoff contention
Source: Overall standings and Commissioner's Cup Standings

== Playoffs ==
**First round** Best-of-3
**1**	**New York Liberty**	**2**
8	Atlanta Dream	0
**4**	**Las Vegas Aces**	**2**
5	Seattle Storm	0
2	**Minnesota Lynx**	**2**
7	Phoenix Mercury	0
3	**Connecticut Sun**	**2**
6	Indiana Fever	0

**Semifinals**; Best-of-5
1	**New York Liberty**	**3**
4	Las Vegas Aces	1
2	**Minnesota Lynx**	**3**
3	Connecticut Sun	2

**Finals**; Best-of-5
1	**New York Liberty**	**3**
2	Minnesota Lynx	2

- **Bold** – Series winner
- Italic – Team with home-court-advantage

== Statistics ==
Legend
GP	Games played	GS	Games started	MPG	Minutes per game	RPG	Rebounds per game
APG	Assists per game	SPG	Steals per game	BPG	Blocks per game	PPG	Points per game
FG%	Field-goal percentage	3P%	3-point field-goal percentage	FT%	Free-throw percentage	TO	Turnovers per game
PF	Fouls per game		Team leader		League leader

=== Regular season ===
Player	GP	GS	MPG	FG%	3P%	FT%	RPG	APG	SPG	BPG	TO	PF	PPG
Napheesa Collier	34	34	34.7	.492	.310	.804	9.7	3.4	1.9	1.4	2.1	2.6	20.4
Kayla McBride	39	39	31.7	.420	.407	.893	2.6	3.2	1.3	0.1	2.0	1.2	15.0
Courtney Williams	40	40	26.5	.443	.333	.810	4.7	5.5	0.9	0.4	2.5	1.9	11.1
Alanna Smith	39	39	26.5	.471	.398	.750	5.6	3.2	1.4	1.5	1.9	3.1	10.1
Bridget Carleton	39	36	29.9	.444	.444	.789	3.8	2.2	1.0	0.3	1.0	2.1	9.6
Myisha Hines-Allen ^{≠}	13	1	17.7	.500	.364	.839	4.2	2.2	0.8	0.2	1.3	2.3	7.5
Natisha Hiedeman	40	0	15.2	.380	.280	.735	1.6	2.4	0.8	0.2	1.1	1.2	4.9
Dorka Juhász	34	7	16.1	.479	.324	.650	3.8	1.1	0.4	0.4	0.6	1.1	4.8
Cecilia Zandalasini	40	0	12.2	.453	.443	.621	1.2	1.1	0.4	0.2	0.8	1.4	4.6
Diamond Miller	21	4	10.1	.304	.192	.583	1.8	0.6	0.3	0.0	0.9	1.1	2.9
Alissa Pili	22	0	6.3	.422	.333	.545	1.2	0.2	0.2	0.1	0.9	1.3	2.4
Sika Koné ^{†}	17	0	3.4	.412	—	.778	0.7	0.1	0.1	0.0	0.3	0.3	1.2
Olivia Époupa ^{†} ^{≠}	17	0	6.7	.375	—	1.000	1.1	1.5	0.8	0.0	0.9	0.8	0.8
Taylor Soule ^{‡}	2	0	1.5	—	—	—	0.5	0.0	0.0	0.0	0.5	0.0	0.0

^{‡}Waived/Released during the season
^{†}Traded during the season
^{≠}Acquired during the season

=== Playoffs ===
Player	GP	GS	MPG	FG%	3P%	FT%	RPG	APG	SPG	BPG	TO	PF	PPG
Napheesa Collier	12	12	38.8	.525	.414	.847	9.0	3.3	2.1	1.9	2.7	3.0	23.8
Kayla McBride	12	12	36.5	.441	.382	.900	2.3	3.7	1.1	0.0	1.1	1.8	15.3
Courtney Williams	12	12	29.4	.415	.444	.913	4.1	6.0	1.2	0.3	3.1	1.8	13.8
Bridget Carleton	12	12	33.8	.435	.339	.947	3.8	1.4	0.7	0.3	0.9	2.8	9.3
Alanna Smith	12	12	28.4	.520	.412	.700	5.3	2.8	1.2	1.7	1.8	3.0	8.8
Natisha Hiedeman	12	0	14.3	.455	.222	.933	1.3	2.3	0.7	0.1	0.9	1.0	5.7
Myisha Hines-Allen	10	0	12.3	.415	.000	.750	3.3	1.1	0.3	0.1	1.2	1.4	4.0
Cecilia Zandalasini	11	0	9.5	.370	.250	.500	1.2	0.4	0.2	0.0	0.5	0.8	2.3
Dorka Juhász	7	0	5.7	.600	.000	.500	1.3	0.6	0.1	0.1	0.3	0.4	1.0
Diamond Miller	6	0	0.7	—	—	—	0.0	0.0	0.0	0.0	0.0	0.0	0.0
Olivia Époupa	4	0	0.5	—	—	—	0.0	0.0	0.0	0.0	0.0	0.3	0.0
Alissa Pili	3	0	0.3	—	—	—	0.0	0.0	0.0	0.0	0.3	0.0	0.0

== Awards and honors ==
Recipient	Award/Milestone	Date Awarded	Reference
Bridget Carleton	Sylvia Fowles Altruism Award	September 19, 2024	
Napheesa Collier	WNBA All-Star	July 2, 2024	
Napheesa Collier	WNBA Western Conference Player of the Month - August	September 4, 2024	
Napheesa Collier	Western Conference Player of the Week	May 21, 2024	
Napheesa Collier	Western Conference Player of the Week	August 27, 2024	
Napheesa Collier	Western Conference Player of the Week	September 10, 2024	
Napheesa Collier	AP Defensive Player of the Year	September 22, 2024	
Napheesa Collier	AP All-WNBA First Team	September 22, 2024	
Napheesa Collier	WNBA Defensive Player of the Year	September 29, 2024	
Napheesa Collier	WNBA All-Defensive First Team	September 29, 2024	
Napheesa Collier	All-WNBA First Team	October 16, 2024	
Kayla McBride	WNBA All-Star	July 2, 2024	
Kayla McBride	AP All-WNBA Second Team	September 22, 2024	
Cheryl Reeve	WNBA Coach of the Month - June	July 2, 2024	
Cheryl Reeve	AP Coach of the Year	September 22, 2024	
Cheryl Reeve	WNBA Coach of the Year	September 29, 2024	
Cheryl Reeve	WNBA Basketball Executive of the Year	September 29, 2024	
Alanna Smith	WNBA All-Defensive Second Team	September 29, 2024	
