= 2023 Chicago Sky season =

- Head coach: James Wade (until July 1); Emre Vatansever (after July 1)
- Arena: Wintrust Arena

Results
- Record: 18–22 (.450)
- Place: 5th (Eastern)
- Playoff finish: 8th seed; Lost 1st Round 0–2 to Las Vegas

The 2023 Chicago Sky season was the franchise's 18th season in the Women's National Basketball Association, and their fifth season under head coach James Wade. In the offseason, the team saw the departures of several key players in free agency including Candace Parker, Courtney Vandersloot, Allie Quigley, and Azurá Stevens.

On July 1, 2023, Wade stepped down as the head coach of the Sky to become an assistant coach of the Toronto Raptors in the NBA, so he was replaced by Emre Vatansever for the rest of the season.

The Women’s National Basketball Association announced that the first WNBA Canada Game would feature the Minnesota Lynx and the Sky on Saturday, May 13, 2023, at Scotiabank Arena in Toronto, ON. It was the first-ever WNBA preseason game in Canada.

The Sky started the season well, winning their first two games. However, they lost two of their last three in May to finish the month 3–2. The Sky won two of their first three games in June before going on a six-game losing streak. They defeated Los Angeles twice to finish the month and ended June with a 4–7 record. July began with a win before the team lost four straight games. Wins book-ended two losses to finish the month and the Sky finished with a 3–6 record in July. August started with two back-to-back wins in Dallas, but then the Sky lost five straight games. They finished the month winning three of their last five games to finish August with a 5–6 record. The Sky were battling with Los Angeles for the eighth and final playoff spot entering September. The Sky lost their first game of September, but won the last three to clinch the eighth seed on September 8, after defeating Minnesota.

As the eighth seed in the 2023 WNBA Playoffs, the Sky faced off against the first seed Las Vegas Aces in the First Round. The Sky lost the first game in Las Vegas 59–87. Needing a win in the second game, the Sky lost 70–92 in the second game and were eliminated from the playoffs. Their .450 winning percentage was the worst since 2018 and this was their fifth straight year qualifying for the playoffs.

== Transactions ==
=== WNBA draft ===
| Round | Pick | Player | Nationality | School/Team/Country |
|---|---|---|---|---|
| 2 | 23 | Kayana Traylor | United States | Virginia Tech |
| 3 | 35 | Kseniya Malashka | Belarus | Middle Tennessee |

=== Transactions ===
| Date | Transaction |
|---|---|
| January 11, 2023 | Extended a Qualifying Offer to Rebekah Gardner |
| February 3, 2023 | Signed Elizabeth Williams |
| February 4, 2023 | Signed Courtney Williams |
| February 5, 2023 | Signed Isabelle Harrison |
| February 5, 2023 | Signed Feyonda Fitzgerald and Robyn Parks to Training Camp Contracts |
| February 7, 2023 | Signed Astou Ndour-Fall to a 1-Year Deal |
| February 11, 2023 | Acquired Marina Mabrey and a 2024 Second-Round Pick (from Phoenix) in a 4-Team Trade involving the Dallas Wings, Phoenix Mercury, and the New York Liberty |
| February 13, 2023 | Signed Rebekah Gardner to a Reserved Qualifying Offers |
| February 14, 2023 | Signed Alanna Smith to a 1-Year Deal |
| February 14, 2023 | Suspended the contract of Julie Allemand for the full season due to her commitments with the Belgium National Team this summer |
| February 16, 2023 | Signed Anneli Maley to a Training Camp Contract |
| February 21, 2023 | Claimed Kristine Anigwe off of Waivers |
| April 12, 2023 | Suspend the contract of Astou Ndour-Fall for the full season due to a personal decision |
| April 12, 2023 | Signed Angel Baker to a Training Camp Contract |
| April 17, 2023 | Signed Morgan Bertsch to a Training Camp Contract |
| April 29, 2023 | Signed Kayana Traylor to a Rookie Scale Deal |
| May 10, 2023 | Waived Angel Baker |
| May 14, 2023 | Exercised 4th-Year Team Option on Dana Evans |
| May 17, 2023 | Waived Feyonda Fitzgerald and Kayana Traylor |
| May 18, 2023 | Suspended the contract of Li Yueru for the Full-Season due to Non-WNBA Injury |
| May 18, 2023 | Claimed Sika Koné off Waivers |
| May 18, 2023 | Waived Anneli Maley |
| May 18, 2023 | Placed Ruthy Hebard on the Inactive List due to Pregnancy/Child-Birth |
| June 5, 2023 | Temporarily suspend the contract of Kristine Anigwe due to Overseas Commitments |
| June 9, 2023 | Signed Khaalia Hillsman and Taylor Soule to Hardship Contracts |
| June 17, 2023 | Released Khaalia Hillsman from the Hardship Contract |
| June 22, 2023 | Activated the temporarily suspended contract of Kristine Anigwe due to Overseas Commitments |
| July 1, 2023 | Head coach James Wade resigned as Head Coach and GM to take an Assistant Coach position with the Toronto Raptors |
| July 1, 2023 | Promoted Assistant Coach Emre Vatansever to Interim Head Coach/GM |
| July 3, 2023 | Activated Ruthy Hebard from the Inactive List due to Pregnancy/Maternity Leave |
| July 3, 2023 | Waived Kristine Anigwe |
| July 27, 2023 | Temporarily suspend the contract of Sika Koné due to Overseas Commitments |
| August 8, 2023 | Activated the temporarily suspended contract of Sika Koné due to Overseas Commitments |
| September 10, 2023 | Signed Kahleah Copper to a Contract Extension |
| October 12, 2023 | Hired Teresa Weatherspoon as Head Coach |

=== Roster changes ===
==== Additions ====
| Personnel | Signed/Trade | Former team |
|---|---|---|
| Elizabeth Williams | Free Agency | Washington Mystics |
| Courtney Williams | Free Agency | Connecticut Sun |
| Isabelle Harrison | Free Agency | Dallas Wings |
| Marina Mabrey | Trade | Dallas Wings |
| Alanna Smith | Free Agency | - |
| Morgan Bertsch | Free Agency | - |
| Robyn Parks | Free Agency | - |
| Sika Koné | Waiver Claim | New York Liberty |
| Taylor Soule | Free Agency | Minnesota Lynx |

==== Subtractions ====
| Personnel | Reason | New team |
|---|---|---|
| Candace Parker | Free agency | Las Vegas Aces |
| Courtney Vandersloot | Free agency | New York Liberty |
| Allie Quigley | Free agency | Sitting out 2023 season |
| Azurá Stevens | Free agency | Los Angeles Sparks |
| Emma Meesseman | Belgium National Team commitment | - |
| Julie Allemand | Belgium National Team commitment | - |
| Li Yueru | Non-WNBA Injury | - |

== Roster ==
2023 Chicago Sky roster
Players
Coaches

| Pos. | No. | Nat. | Name | Height | Weight | DOB | From | Yrs |
|---|---|---|---|---|---|---|---|---|
| F | 25 | (United States) | Bertsch, Morgan | 6' 4" (1.93m) | 173 lb (78kg) | 1997-04-20 | UC Davis | R |
| G/F | 2 | (United States) | Copper, Kahleah | 6' 1" (1.85m) | 165 lb (75kg) | 1994-08-28 | Rutgers | 7 |
| G | 11 | (United States) | Evans, Dana | 5' 6" (1.68m) | 145 lb (66kg) | 1998-08-01 | Louisville | 2 |
| G | 35 | (United States) | Gardner, Rebekah (injured) | 6' 1" (1.85m) | 130 lb (59kg) | 1990-07-09 | UCLA | 1 |
| F | 20 | (United States) | Harrison, Isabelle (injured) | 6' 3" (1.91m) | 183 lb (83kg) | 1993-09-27 | Tennessee | 6 |
| F | 24 | (United States) | Hebard, Ruthy | 6' 4" (1.93m) | 190 lb (86kg) | 1998-04-28 | Oregon | 3 |
| F | 23 | (Mali) | Koné, Sika (S) | 6' 4" (1.93m) | 180 lb (82kg) | 2002-07-13 | Mali | R |
| G | 4 | (United States) | Mabrey, Marina | 5' 11" (1.8m) | 170 lb (77kg) | 1996-09-14 | Notre Dame | 4 |
| F | 21 | (United States) | Parks, Robyn | 6' 1" (1.85m) | 170 lb (77kg) | 1992-07-19 | VCU | R |
| C | 8 | (Australia) | Smith, Alanna | 6' 4" (1.93m) | 180 lb (82kg) | 1996-09-10 | Stanford | 4 |
| F | 7 | (United States) | Soule, Taylor | 5' 11" (1.8m) | 186 lb (84kg) | 2000-01-05 | Virginia Tech | R |
| G | 10 | (United States) | Williams, Courtney | 5' 8" (1.73m) | 133 lb (60kg) | 1994-05-11 | South Florida | 7 |
| C | 1 | (United States) | Williams, Elizabeth | 6' 3" (1.91m) | 200 lb (91kg) | 1993-06-23 | Duke | 8 |

Head coach
(Turkey) Emre Vatansever (Marmara University)
Assistant coaches
(United States) Tonya Edwards (Tennessee)
(Belgium) Ann Wauters
(France) Yoann Cabioc'h
Athletic trainer
(United States) Meghan Lockerby
Strength and conditioning coach
(United States) Ann Crosby (Western Michigan)

Legend

- (C) Team captain
- (DP) Unsigned draft pick
- (FA) Free agent
- (S) Suspended
- Injured

=== Depth ===
| Pos. | Starter | Bench |
|---|---|---|
| PG | Marina Mabrey | Dana Evans |
| SG | Courtney Williams | Rebekah Gardner |
| SF | Kahleah Copper | Robyn Parks; Taylor Soule |
| PF | Alanna Smith | Morgan Bertsch; Sika Koné; Isabelle Harrison |
| C | Elizabeth Williams | Ruthy Hebard |

== Schedule ==
=== Preseason ===
2023 game log
Total: 2–1 (Home: 1–0; Road: 1–1)
May: 2–1 (Home: 1–0; Road: 1–1)

| Game | Date | Team | Score | High points | High rebounds | High assists | Location Attendance | Record |
|---|---|---|---|---|---|---|---|---|
| 1 | May 5 | @ Dallas | L 70–75 | Kahleah Copper (16) | Rebekah Gardner (7) | Dana Evans (3) | College Park Center; 2,004 | 0–1 |
| 2 | May 7 | Indiana | W 81–56 | Isabelle Harrison (15) | Rebekah Gardner (5) | Courtney Williams (4) | Wintrust Arena; 2,024 | 1–1 |
| 3 | May 13 | vs. Minnesota | W 82–74 | Kahleah Copper (18) | Kahleah Copper (9) | Dana Evans (5) | Scotiabank Arena; 19,800 | 2–1 |

2023 season schedule

=== Regular season ===
2023 game log
Total: 18–22 (Home: 7–13; Road: 11–9)
May: 3–2 (Home: 1–1; Road: 2–1)

| Game | Date | Team | Score | High points | High rebounds | High assists | Location Attendance | Record |
|---|---|---|---|---|---|---|---|---|
| 1 | May 19 | @ Minnesota | W 77–66 | Kahleah Copper (20) | Copper; C. Williams (7) | Kahleah Copper (5) | Target Center; 8,024 | 1–0 |
| 2 | May 21 | @ Phoenix | W 75–69 | Kahleah Copper (15) | Elizabeth Williams (8) | Courtney Williams (7) | Footprint Center; 14,040 | 2–0 |
| 3 | May 26 | Washington | L 69–71 | Marina Mabrey (19) | Courtney Williams (9) | Courtney Williams (5) | Wintrust Arena; 7,304 | 2–1 |
| 4 | May 28 | Dallas | W 94–88 | Marina Mabrey (23) | Alanna Smith (12) | Marina Mabrey (8) | Wintrust Arena; 6,042 | 3–1 |
| 5 | May 30 | @ Atlanta | L 65–83 | Dana Evans (11) | Sika Koné (8) | Dana Evans (5) | Gateway Center Arena; 2,562 | 3–2 |

June : 4–7 (Home: 3–3; Road: 1–4)

| Game | Date | Team | Score | High points | High rebounds | High assists | Location Attendance | Record |
|---|---|---|---|---|---|---|---|---|
| 6 | June 2 | New York | L 76–77 | Kahleah Copper (20) | Kahleah Copper (9) | Courtney Williams (7) | Wintrust Arena; 7,188 | 3–3 |
| 7 | June 4 | @ New York | W 86–82 | Kahleah Copper (27) | Courtney Williams (9) | Courtney Williams (6) | Barclays Center; 7,225 | 4–3 |
| 8 | June 6 | Indiana | W 108–103 (OT) | Marina Mabrey (28) | Elizabeth Williams (7) | Dana Evans (7) | Wintrust Arena; 5,201 | 5–3 |
| 9 | June 9 | @ Los Angeles | L 62–77 | Alanna Smith (19) | Alanna Smith (9) | Marina Mabrey (4) | Crypto.com Arena; 5,431 | 5–4 |
| 10 | June 11 | @ Las Vegas | L 80–93 | Marina Mabrey (20) | Alanna Smith (8) | Dana Evans (8) | Michelob Ultra Arena; 9,786 | 5–5 |
| 11 | June 15 | Indiana | L 90–92 | Marina Mabrey (36) | Alanna Smith (11) | Courtney Williams (10) | Wintrust Arena; 6,323 | 5–6 |
| 12 | June 18 | @ Washington | L 69–77 | Morgan Bertsch (16) | Alanna Smith (13) | Courtney Williams (6) | Entertainment and Sports Arena; 4,009 | 5–7 |
| 13 | June 22 | Washington | L 59–80 | Alanna Smith (13) | Alanna Smith (8) | Courtney Williams (9) | Wintrust Arena; 6,158 | 5–8 |
| 14 | June 25 | @ Connecticut | L 72–96 | Kahleah Copper (29) | Kahleah Copper (7) | Evans; Mabrey; C. Williams (5) | Mohegan Sun Arena; 6,517 | 5–9 |
| 15 | June 28 | Los Angeles | W 80–63 | Courtney Williams (21) | Courtney Williams (9) | Marina Mabrey (4) | Wintrust Arena; 8,810 | 6–9 |
| 16 | June 30 | Los Angeles | W 86–78 | Alanna Smith (18) | Courtney Williams (11) | Courtney Williams (13) | Wintrust Arena; 7,272 | 7–9 |

July : 3–6 (Home: 1–5; Road: 2–1)

| Game | Date | Team | Score | High points | High rebounds | High assists | Location Attendance | Record |
|---|---|---|---|---|---|---|---|---|
| 17 | July 2 | @ Indiana | W 89–87 | Courtney Williams (28) | Elizabeth Williams (9) | Courtney Williams (8) | Gainbridge Fieldhouse; 4,004 | 8–9 |
| 18 | July 7 | Atlanta | L 68–82 | Kahleah Copper (16) | Copper; Smith (6) | Courtney Williams (7) | Wintrust Arena; 7,911 | 8–10 |
| 19 | July 9 | Atlanta | L 77–88 | Kahleah Copper (28) | Elizabeth Williams (9) | Courtney Williams (7) | Wintrust Arena; 7,325 | 8–11 |
| 20 | July 12 | Connecticut | L 72–84 | Kahleah Copper (22) | C. Williams; E. Williams (8) | Courtney Williams (6) | Wintrust Arena; 9,025 | 8–12 |
| 21 | July 20 | @ Phoenix | L 62–80 | Kahleah Copper (17) | Elizabeth Williams (8) | Elizabeth Williams (5) | Footprint Center; 11,292 | 8–13 |
| 22 | July 22 | @ Seattle | W 90–75 | Kahleah Copper (29) | Alanna Smith (17) | Marina Mabrey (6) | Climate Pledge Arena; 8,655 | 9–13 |
| 23 | July 25 | Las Vegas | L 95–107 | Kahleah Copper (37) | Alanna Smith (8) | Courtney Williams (11) | Wintrust Arena; 9,025 | 9–14 |
| 24 | July 28 | Seattle | L 74–83 | Kahleah Copper (17) | Kahleah Copper (8) | Courtney Williams (5) | Wintrust Arena; 7,213 | 9–15 |
| 25 | July 30 | Phoenix | W 104–85 | Kahleah Copper (24) | Mabrey; E. Williams (5) | Courtney Williams (9) | Wintrust Arena; 8,914 | 10–15 |

August : 5–6 (Home: 1–3; Road: 4–3)

| Game | Date | Team | Score | High points | High rebounds | High assists | Location Attendance | Record |
|---|---|---|---|---|---|---|---|---|
| 26 | August 4 | @ Dallas | W 104–89 | Copper; C. Williams (25) | Courtney Williams (6) | Courtney Williams (6) | College Park Center; 3,762 | 11–15 |
| 27 | August 6 | @ Dallas | W 104–96 | Marina Mabrey (32) | Courtney Williams (8) | Courtney Williams (8) | College Park Center; 4,057 | 12–15 |
| 28 | August 8 | Minnesota | L 79–88 | Kahleah Copper (23) | Elizabeth Williams (9) | Courtney Williams (6) | Wintrust Arena; 5,099 | 12–16 |
| 29 | August 11 | New York | 73–89 | Alanna Smith (19) | Courtney Williams (10) | Courtney Williams (6) | Wintrust Arena; 8,070 | 12–17 |
| 30 | August 13 | @ Washington | L 76–83 | Kahleah Copper (17) | Elizabeth Williams (12) | Courtney Williams (7) | Entertainment and Sports Arena; 3,796 | 12–18 |
| 31 | August 18 | @ Atlanta | L 67–78 | Dana Evans (18) | Alanna Smith (12) | Elizabeth Williams (5) | Gateway Center Arena; 2,957 | 12–19 |
| 32 | August 20 | Connecticut | L 73–79 | Kahleah Copper (15) | Alanna Smith (8) | C. Williams; E. Williams (6) | Wintrust Arena; 6,901 | 12–20 |
| 33 | August 22 | Seattle | W 102–79 | Dana Evans (23) | Alanna Smith (7) | Dana Evans (8) | Wintrust Arena; 4,822 | 13–20 |
| 34 | August 24 | Las Vegas | L 87–94 | Marina Mabrey (22) | Elizabeth Williams (9) | Courtney Williams (6) | Wintrust Arena; 8,084 | 13–21 |
| 35 | August 27 | @ Seattle | W 90–85 | Elizabeth Williams (23) | Kahleah Copper (12) | C. Williams; Evans (6) | Climate Pledge Arena; 9,893 | 14–21 |
| 36 | August 29 | @ Los Angeles | W 76–75 | Kahleah Copper (22) | C. Williams; E. Williams (9) | Courtney Williams (7) | Crypto.com Arena; 6,041 | 15–21 |

September : 3–1 (Home: 1–1; Road: 2–0)

| Game | Date | Team | Score | High points | High rebounds | High assists | Location Attendance | Record |
|---|---|---|---|---|---|---|---|---|
| 37 | September 3 | New York | L 69–86 | Kahleah Copper (23) | C. Williams; E. Williams (7) | Courtney Williams (6) | Wintrust Arena; 8,223 | 15–22 |
| 38 | September 5 | @ Indiana | W 96–69 | Kahleah Copper (25) | Courtney Williams (8) | Marina Mabrey (6) | Gainbridge Fieldhouse; 2,450 | 16–22 |
| 39 | September 8 | Minnesota | W 92–87 | Kahleah Copper (20) | Sika Koné (10) | Courtney Williams (10) | Wintrust Arena; 7,994 | 17–22 |
| 40 | September 10 | @ Connecticut | W 102–91 (OT) | Courtney Williams (23) | Courtney Williams (16) | Courtney Williams (13) | Mohegan Sun Arena; 6,377 | 18–22 |

2023 season schedule

=== Playoffs ===
2023 playoff game log
First Round vs. Las Vegas
Lost Series: 0-2

| Game | Date | Team | Score | High points | High rebounds | High assists | Location Attendance | Series |
|---|---|---|---|---|---|---|---|---|
| 1 | September 13 | @ Las Vegas | L 59–87 | Kahleah Copper (15) | Courtney Williams (11) | Courtney Williams (6) | T-Mobile Arena; 12,927 | 0–1 |
| 2 | September 17 | @ Las Vegas | L 70–92 | Kahleah Copper (25) | Copper; E. Williams (10) | Elizabeth Williams (5) | Michelob Ultra Arena; 9,000 | 0–2 |

2023 playoff schedule

== Standings ==
| # | Team | W | L | PCT | GB | Conf. | Home | Road | Cup |
|---|---|---|---|---|---|---|---|---|---|
| 1 | x – Las Vegas Aces | 34 | 6 | .850 | – | 18–2 | 19–1 | 15–5 | 9–1 |
| 2 | x – New York Liberty | 32 | 8 | .800 | 2 | 16–4 | 15–5 | 17–3 | 7–3 |
| 3 | x – Connecticut Sun | 27 | 13 | .675 | 7 | 14–6 | 13–7 | 14–6 | 7–3 |
| 4 | x – Dallas Wings | 22 | 18 | .550 | 12 | 11–9 | 11–9 | 11–9 | 6–4 |
| 5 | x – Atlanta Dream | 19 | 21 | .475 | 15 | 11–9 | 11–9 | 8–12 | 6–4 |
| 6 | x – Minnesota Lynx | 19 | 21 | .475 | 15 | 12–8 | 9–11 | 10–10 | 5–5 |
| 7 | x – Washington Mystics | 19 | 21 | .475 | 15 | 9–11 | 12–8 | 7–13 | 5–5 |
| 8 | x – Chicago Sky | 18 | 22 | .450 | 16 | 5–15 | 7–13 | 11–9 | 3–7 |
| 9 | e – Los Angeles Sparks | 17 | 23 | .425 | 17 | 9–11 | 10–10 | 7–13 | 5–5 |
| 10 | e – Indiana Fever | 13 | 27 | .325 | 21 | 5–15 | 6–14 | 7–13 | 2–8 |
| 11 | e – Seattle Storm | 11 | 29 | .275 | 23 | 8–12 | 4–16 | 7–13 | 4–6 |
| 12 | e – Phoenix Mercury | 9 | 31 | .225 | 25 | 2–18 | 8–12 | 1–19 | 1–9 |

Notes

(#) – League Standing
x – Clinched playoff berth
e – Eliminated from postseason contention
Source: Overall standings and Commissioner's Cup Standings

== Playoffs ==
**First round** Best-of-3
**1** | **Las Vegas Aces** | **2**
8 | Chicago Sky | 0
**4** | **Dallas Wings** | **2**
5 | Atlanta Dream | 0
**2** | **New York Liberty** | **2**
7 | Washington Mystics | 0
**3** | **Connecticut Sun** | **2**
6 | Minnesota Lynx | 1

**Semifinals**; Best-of-5
**1** | **Las Vegas Aces** | **3**
4 | Dallas Wings | 0
**2** | **New York Liberty** | **3**
3 | Connecticut Sun | 1

**Finals**; Best-of-5
1 | **Las Vegas Aces** | **3**
2 | New York Liberty | 1

- **Bold** – Series winner
- Italic – Team with home-court advantage

== Statistics ==
Legend
| GP | Games played | GS | Games started | MPG | Minutes per game | RPG | Rebounds per game |
| APG | Assists per game | SPG | Steals per game | BPG | Blocks per game | PPG | Points per game |
| FG% | Field-goal percentage | 3P% | 3-point field-goal percentage | FT% | Free-throw percentage | TO | Turnovers per game |
| PF | Fouls per game | | Team leader | | League leader |

=== Regular season ===
| Player | GP | GS | MPG | FG% | 3P% | FT% | RPG | APG | SPG | BPG | PPG |
|---|---|---|---|---|---|---|---|---|---|---|---|
| Kahleah Copper | 38 | 38 | 31.2 | .448 | .404 | .770 | 4.4 | 2.0 | 0.9 | 0.3 | 18.7 |
| Marina Mabrey | 39 | 39 | 30.0 | .411 | .390 | .836 | 3.7 | 3.6 | 0.7 | 0.5 | 15.0 |
| Courtney Williams | 40 | 40 | 30.1 | .437 | .443 | .600 | 6.0 | 6.3 | 1.0 | 0.3 | 10.4 |
| Elizabeth Williams | 40 | 40 | 29.7 | .514 | .000 | .630 | 5.8 | 2.5 | 1.3 | 1.5 | 9.8 |
| Alanna Smith | 38 | 35 | 26.5 | .498 | .294 | .679 | 6.6 | 1.8 | 1.3 | 1.3 | 9.2 |
| Dana Evans | 39 | 1 | 21.5 | .360 | .294 | .854 | 1.2 | 3.0 | 0.7 | 0.1 | 9.0 |
| Rebekah Gardner | 3 | 0 | 19.7 | .429 | .600 | 1.000 | 3.7 | 2.3 | 2.0 | 0.3 | 7.0 |
| Morgan Bertsch | 28 | 5 | 14.2 | .456 | .444 | .750 | 1.7 | 0.7 | 0.4 | 0.3 | 4.4 |
| Robyn Parks | 37 | 2 | 13.6 | .381 | .368 | 1.000 | 1.6 | 0.4 | 0.3 | 0.1 | 3.9 |
| Ruthy Hebard | 19 | 0 | 9.2 | .585 | .000 | .650 | 2.4 | 0.4 | 0.3 | 0.4 | 3.9 |
| Sika Koné^{≠} | 20 | 0 | 9.3 | .532 | .333 | .769 | 3.0 | 0.5 | 0.2 | 0.1 | 3.6 |
| Kristine Anigwe^{‡} | 10 | 0 | 8.3 | .455 | .000 | .625 | 2.1 | 0.4 | 0.3 | 0.5 | 2.5 |
| Taylor Soule^{≠} | 15 | 0 | 3.5 | .143 | .000 | .625 | 0.5 | 0.2 | 0.0 | 0.1 | 0.6 |
| Khaalia Hillsman^{‡} | 1 | 0 | 1.0 | .000 | .000 | .000 | 0.0 | 0.0 | 0.0 | 0.0 | 0.0 |

^{‡}Waived/Released during the season
^{†}Traded during the season
^{≠}Acquired during the season

=== Playoffs ===
| Player | GP | GS | MPG | FG% | 3P% | FT% | RPG | APG | SPG | BPG | PPG |
|---|---|---|---|---|---|---|---|---|---|---|---|
| Kahleah Copper | 2 | 2 | 34.5 | .406 | .455 | .750 | 7.5 | 1.5 | 0.5 | 0.0 | 20.0 |
| Dana Evans | 2 | 0 | 22.5 | .417 | .250 | 1.000 | 0.5 | 3.5 | 1.5 | 0.0 | 14.5 |
| Marina Mabrey | 2 | 2 | 32.5 | .348 | .222 | 1.000 | 3.5 | 1.5 | 0.0 | 1.5 | 9.5 |
| Courtney Williams | 2 | 2 | 32.5 | .316 | .286 | .000 | 8.0 | 4.0 | 0.5 | 1.0 | 7.0 |
| Elizabeth Williams | 2 | 2 | 33.0 | .286 | .000 | .000 | 10.0 | 3.0 | 0.5 | 2.0 | 4.0 |
| Alanna Smith | 2 | 2 | 18.0 | .300 | .000 | 1.000 | 4.5 | 0.5 | 0.0 | 1.0 | 4.0 |
| Robyn Parks | 2 | 0 | 13.0 | .333 | .333 | .000 | 2.0 | 0.0 | 0.0 | 0.0 | 2.5 |
| Sika Koné | 2 | 0 | 4.5 | .667 | .000 | .000 | 0.5 | 0.5 | 0.0 | 0.0 | 2.0 |
| Ruthy Hebard | 2 | 0 | 7.0 | .250 | .000 | .000 | 1.0 | 0.0 | 1.0 | 0.5 | 1.0 |
| Morgan Bertsch | 1 | 0 | 5.0 | .000 | .000 | .000 | 0.0 | 0.0 | 0.0 | 0.0 | 0.0 |
| Taylor Soule | 1 | 0 | 1.0 | .000 | .000 | .000 | 0.0 | 0.0 | 0.0 | 0.0 | 0.0 |

== Awards and honors ==
| Recipient | Award | Date awarded | Ref. |
|---|---|---|---|
| Kahleah Copper | WNBA All-Star | July 1 | |
| Courtney Williams | Eastern Conference Player of the Week | July 5 | |
| Elizabeth Williams | All-Defensive Second Team | September 22 | |
