= Michaela Onyenwere =

American basketball player (born 1999)

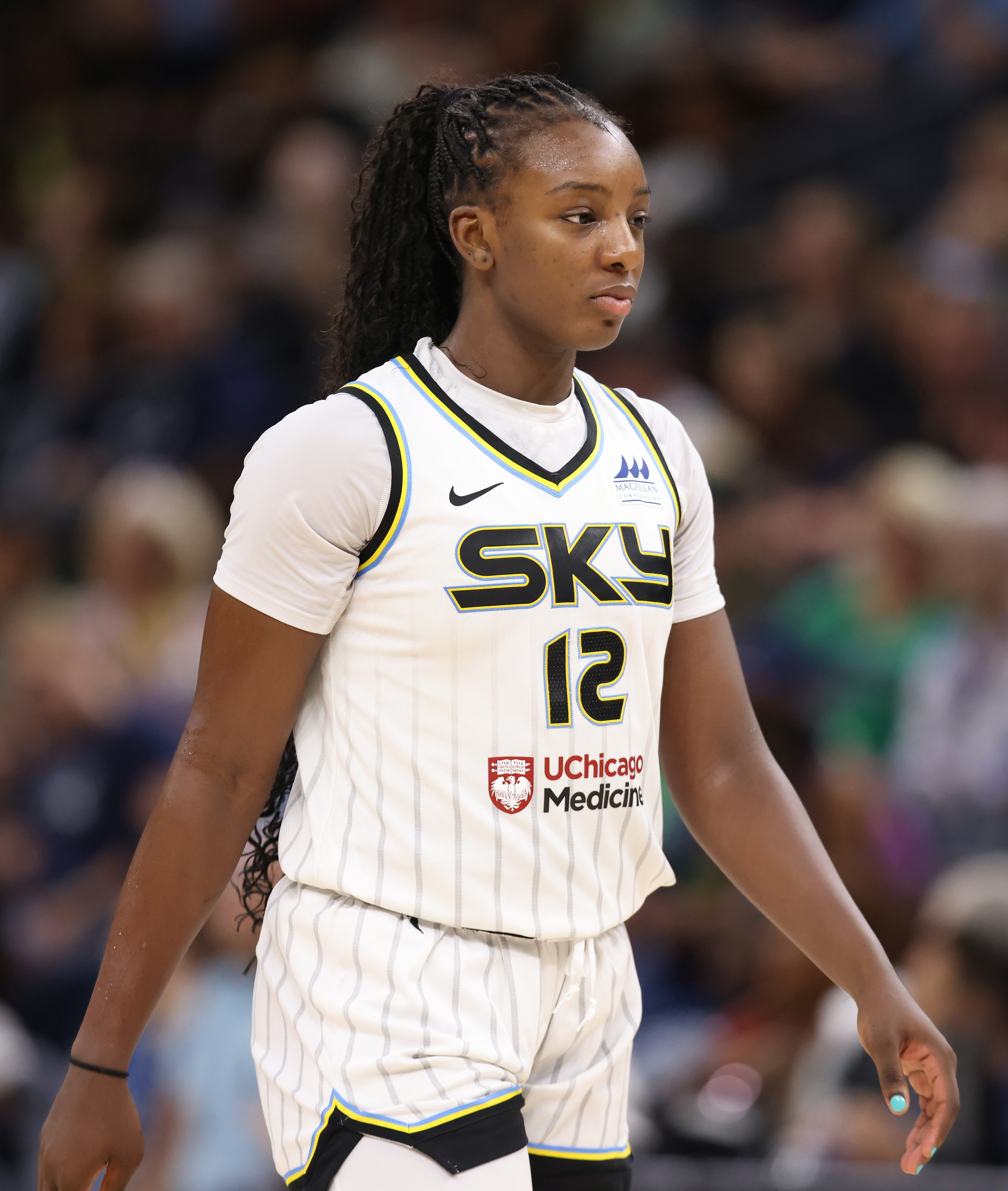
- Onyenwere with the Chicago Sky in 2024

No. 12 – Washington Mystics
- Position: Forward
- League: WNBA

Personal information
- Born: August 10, 1999 (age 27) Aurora, Colorado, U.S.
- Listed height: 6 ft 0 in (1.83 m)
- Listed weight: 202 lb (92 kg)

Career information
- High school: Grandview (Aurora, Colorado)
- College: UCLA (2017–2021)
- WNBA draft: 2021: 1st round, 6th overall pick
- Drafted by: New York Liberty
- Playing career: 2021–present

Career history
- 2021–2022: New York Liberty
- 2021–2022: Spar Girona
- 2022–2023: CB Avenida
- 2023: Phoenix Mercury
- 2023–2024: OGM Ormanspor
- 2024–2025: Chicago Sky
- 2025: Jiangsu Phoenix
- 2026–present: Washington Mystics

Career highlights
- WNBA Rookie of the Year (2021); WNBA All-Rookie Team (2021); 2× Third-team All-American – AP, USBWA (2020, 2021); 3× All Pac-12 (2019–2021); Pac-12 All-Freshman Team (2018); McDonald's All-American (2017)
- Stats at Basketball Reference
Medals
Women's basketball
Representing United States
Pan American Games
Silver medal – second place	2019 Lima	Team

Michaela Nne Onyenwere (/ˌoʊnjənˈwɛdɛ/; born August 10, 1999) is a Nigerian-American basketball player for the Washington Mystics of the Women's National Basketball Association (WNBA). She played college basketball with the UCLA Bruins of the Pac-12 Conference.

== Early life and college ==
In high school, Onyenwere was named a McDonald's All-American in 2017.

Following the 2017–18 season, Onyenwere was named to the Pac-12 All-Freshman Team.

In the 2018–19 season, Onyenwere's sophomore season, she was named to the All-Pac-12 team and to the Media All-Pac-12 team, and she ranked second in the Pac-12 for offensive rebounds per game. After that season, she earned on a spot on the 2019 U.S. Pan-American Games Women's Basketball Team.

In the 2019–20 season, Onyenwere was again named to the All-Pac-12 team, along with her teammate Japreece Dean. She was named AP and USBWA Third-Team All-American.

In the 2020–21 season, Onyenwere was named to the All-Pac-12 team for the third year in a row, and once again named AP and USBWA Third-Team All-American. She was also named Top 5 Finalist of the Cheryl Miller Award. Onyenwere finished her college career fourth on UCLA's all-time scoring list with 1,888-career points.

== Professional career ==
=== WNBA ===
==== New York Liberty (2021–2022) ====
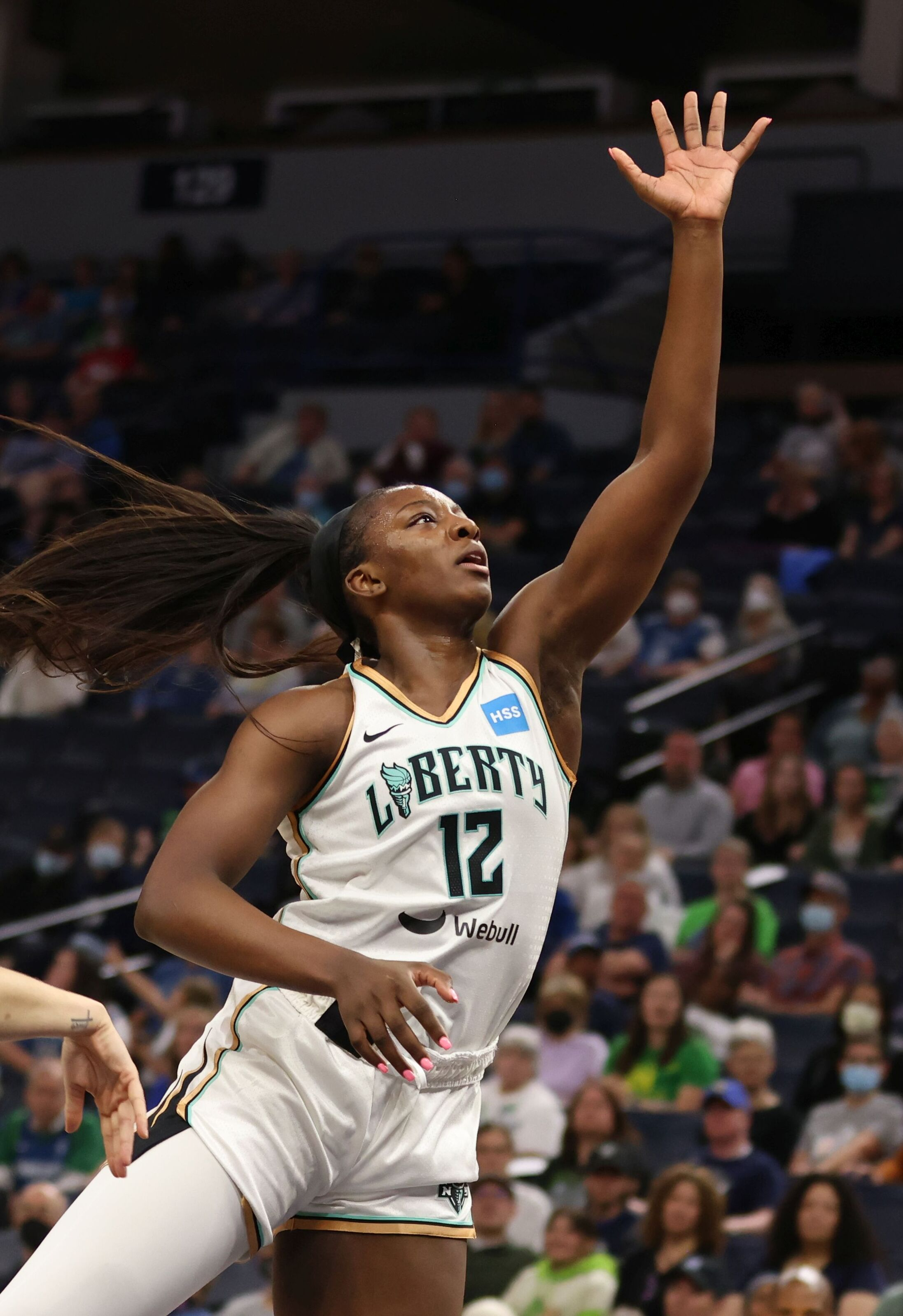
Onyenwere with the New York Liberty in 2022

Onyenwere was drafted 6th overall in the 2021 WNBA draft by the New York Liberty.

In her rookie season in 2021, Onyenwere was named in the 2021 WNBA All-Rookie Team and 2021 WNBA Rookie of the Year. She became the first player in franchise history to win the award. Onyenwere was the leading candidate for most of the season, winning every Rookie of the Month award to become just the fifth player in WNBA history to sweep that honor during a season, and fell just two votes shy of winning unanimously. Onyenwere started in 29 of 32 games and was the most productive player in the class by some margin. She averaged 8.6 points and 2.9 rebounds per game, leading all rookies in scoring and 3-pointers made (37).

Onyenwere's role diminished in her second season with the Liberty under new head coach Sandy Brondello. Onyenwere was moved to the bench and started only one game all season. She also struggled with nagging injuries since the start of the training camp, which contributed to her minutes decreasing from an average of 22.2 minutes in 2021 to 13.7 minutes in 2022. With the Liberty acquiring star frontcourt players such as Breanna Stewart and Jonquel Jones before the 2023 season, Onyenwere's roster spot was in question and she was consequently traded.

==== Phoenix Mercury (2023) ====
On February 11, 2023, Onyenwere was traded to the Phoenix Mercury in a four-team trade involving the New York Liberty, Phoenix Mercury, Dallas Wings, and Chicago Sky. She started 27 of 40 games and set career highs in every category, but it was a disappointing season for the Mercury, who finished 12th in the league with a 9–31 record.

==== Chicago Sky (2024–2025) ====
On February 6, 2024, Onyenwere was traded to the Chicago Sky alongside Brianna Turner, the 2024 No. 3 pick, a 2025 second round pick (from CHI), a 2026 first round pick, and the right to swap 2026 second round in exchange for Kahleah Copper and the rights to Morgan Bertsch. Onyenwere saw limited playing time in the first half of the 2024 season, but earned a place in the starting lineup after the Olympic break, replacing Marina Mabrey, who was traded to the Connecticut Sun.

Onyenwere re-signed with the Sky for the 2025 season.

==== Washington Mystics (2026) ====
In April 2026, Onyenwere signed a contract with the Washington Mystics. Her new teammates include Lauren Betts and Angela Dugalic, who were coached by Onyenwere during their senior year at UCLA in 2025-2026.

=== Overseas ===
In December 2021, Onyenwere joined the Catalan team Uni Girona CB of the Spanish Liga Femenina de Baloncesto.

In December 2022, Onyenwere joined the Spanish team CB Avenida.

In the 2023–2024 offseason, she played in OGM Ormanspor of the Turkish Women's Basketball Super League.

In February 2025, Onyenwere joined the Jiangsu Phoenix of the Women's Chinese Basketball Association (WCBA).

=== Coaching ===
Onyenwere was part of the 2025–26 UCLA Bruins women's basketball team coaching staff. This team won the 2026 NCAA Division I women's basketball tournament national championship. At UCLA, Onyewere coached her future Mystics teammates Lauren Betts and Angela Dugalić.

Before the 2026 WNBA season collective bargaining agreement (CBA) and signing with the Mystics in 2026, this coaching job was possibly her highest professional basketball salary.

== Career statistics ==
Legend
GP	Games played	GS	Games started	MPG	Minutes per game	RPG	Rebounds per game
APG	Assists per game	SPG	Steals per game	BPG	Blocks per game	PPG	Points per game
TO	Turnovers per game	FG%	Field-goal percentage	3P%	3-point field-goal percentage	FT%	Free-throw percentage
**Bold**	Career best	°	League leader

=== WNBA ===
==== Regular season ====
Stats current through end of 2025 regular season

WNBA regular season statistics
Year	Team	GP	GS	MPG	FG%	3P%	FT%	RPG	APG	SPG	BPG	TO	PPG
2021	New York	32	**29**	22.2	.401	.327	.836	2.9	0.6	0.4	0.3	1.1	8.6
2022	New York	34	1	13.7	.377	.300	.836	2.1	0.4	0.4	0.2	**0.7**	4.7
2023	Phoenix	40	27	**23.8**	.404	.315	.759	**3.7**	**1.3**	**0.8**	**0.5**	2.0	**8.9**
2024	Chicago	34	18	18.7	.415	**.368**	.610	1.8	1.0	0.6	0.4	1.3	6.6
2025	Chicago	**42**	22	16.9	**.422**	.353	**.843**	1.6	1.1	0.4	0.1	1.3	5.8
**Career**	5 years, 3 teams	182	97	19.2	.405	.332	.785	2.4	0.9	0.5	0.3	1.3	6.9

==== Playoffs ====
WNBA playoff statistics
Year	Team	GP	GS	MPG	FG%	3P%	FT%	RPG	APG	SPG	BPG	TO	PPG
2021	New York	1	0	**9.0**	.000	—	—	0.0	0.0	0.0	0.0	0.0	0.0
2022	New York	**3**	0	7.3	**.364**	.000	**1.000**	**1.3**	0.0	0.0	0.0	0.0	**4.7**
**Career**	2 years, 1 team	4	0	7.8	.333	.000	1.000	1.0	0.0	0.0	0.0	0.0	3.5

=== College ===
NCAA statistics
Year	Team	GP	GS	MPG	FG%	3P%	FT%	RPG	APG	SPG	BPG	TO	PPG
2017–18	UCLA	**35**	1	17.1	47.2	16.7	82.2	4.7	0.5	1.1	0.4	**0.7**	6.9
2018–19	UCLA	**35**	**35**	**31.9**	**47.4**	**33.9**	**83.2**	**8.5**	1.1	1.1	**0.9**	1.9	18.3
2019–20	UCLA	30	30	30.3	46.6	25.7	79.3	**8.5**	1.5	**1.5**	0.7	2.0	18.9
2020–21	UCLA	23	23	31.3	42.1	33.3	80.0	7.2	**2.0**	1.1	0.4	2.5	**19.1**
**Career**		123	89	27.2	45.9	30.4	81.0	7.2	1.2	1.2	0.6	1.7	15.3
