= Robyn Parks =

American basketball player (born 1992)

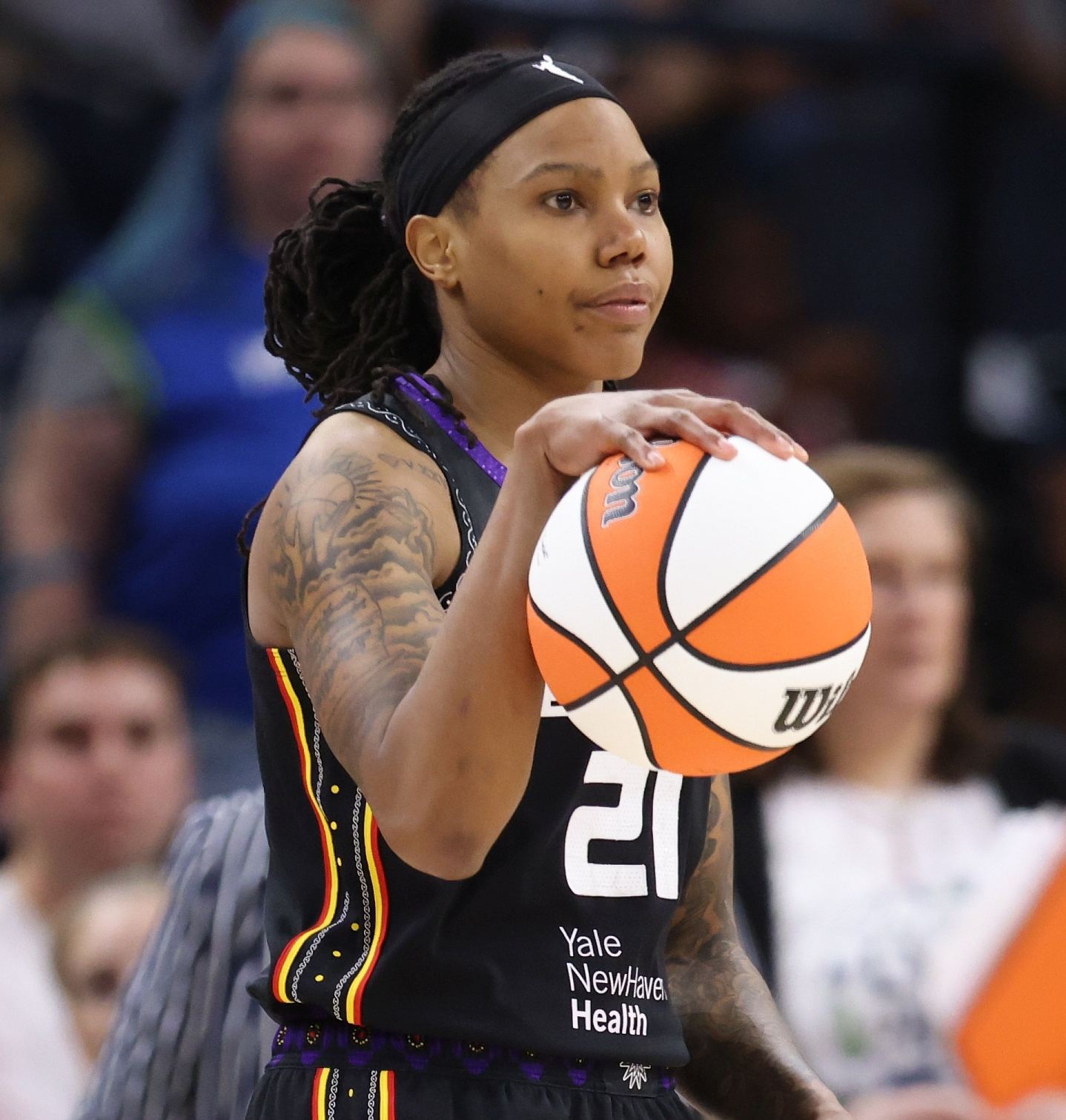
- Parks with the Connecticut Sun in 2025

Athinaikos
- Position: Forward
- League: Greek Women's Basketball League

Personal information
- Born: July 19, 1992 (age 34) Waldorf, Maryland, U.S.
- Listed height: 6 ft 1 in (1.85 m)

Career information
- High school: North Point High School (Waldorf, Maryland)
- College: VCU (2010–2014)
- WNBA draft: 2014: undrafted
- Playing career: 2014–present

Career history
- 2014–2015: Spar Gran Canaria
- 2016–2017: Campus Promete
- 2018–2019: Femeni Sant Adria
- 2019–2020: Valencia
- 2020–2021: Casademont Zaragoza
- 2023: Chicago Sky
- 2025: Connecticut Sun
- 2025-: Athinaikos

Career highlights
- Atlantic 10 All-First Team (2014); Atlantic 10 All-Second Team (2013); Atlantic 10 All-Defensive Team (2014)
- Stats at Basketball Reference

Robyn Parks (born July 19, 1992) is an American-born naturalized Greek professional basketball player who plays for Athinaikos. She previously played for the Chicago Sky and the Connecticut Sun in the Women's National Basketball Association and various international teams. She played college basketball at VCU.

== College career ==
Parks played collegiately at VCU. During her first two seasons with the Rams, Parks had a limited role and suffered a foot injury in December of her sophomore year that limited her playing ability. During her junior season, Parks made a huge jump statistically under new head coach Marlene Stollings. She led the A-10 in scoring and was in the Top 10 for rebounding. During her season season, Parks continued to be dominate for the Rams. She caused matchup problems for the A-10 teams she faced, and credited her ability to do so to Candace Parker, Seimone Augustus, and Kevin Durant - all 3 players she admired and modeled her game after. Parks was named to the A-10 Second Team for her junior year. In the 2013–14 season, Parks was named to the A-10 First Team.

== WNBA career ==
=== Chicago Sky (2023) ===
Parks signed a training camp contract with the Chicago Sky on February 5, 2023. Parks went through camp and made the Sky's roster for Opening Night. Parks made her WNBA debut on May 26, 2023, against the Washington Mystics grabbing 1 rebound in 6 minutes. She scored 9 points against the New York Liberty on June 4, 2023.

On April 21, 2024, the Sky renounced their rights to Parks.

=== Connecticut Sun (2025) ===
On February 4, 2025, Parks signed a training camp contract with the Connecticut Sun. She made the opening day roster but was waived on June 2 after appearing in six games.

== Career statistics ==
Legend
GP	Games played	GS	Games started	MPG	Minutes per game	RPG	Rebounds per game
APG	Assists per game	SPG	Steals per game	BPG	Blocks per game	PPG	Points per game
TO	Turnovers per game	FG%	Field-goal percentage	3P%	3-point field-goal percentage	FT%	Free-throw percentage
**Bold**	Career best	°	League leader

=== WNBA ===
==== Regular season ====
Stats current through game on May 30, 2025

WNBA regular season statistics
Year	Team	GP	GS	MPG	FG%	3P%	FT%	RPG	APG	SPG	BPG	TO	PPG
2023	Chicago	**37**	**2**	**13.6**	**.381**	**.368**	**1.000**	**1.6**	**0.4**	**0.3**	**0.1**	0.5	3.9
2024	Did not appear in league												
2025	Connecticut	6	0	10.5	.200	.000	—	1.5	0.3	**0.3**	0.0	**0.2**	0.3
**Career**	2 years, 2 teams	43	2	13.2	.375	.352	1.000	1.6	0.4	0.3	0.1	0.5	3.4

==== Playoffs ====
WNBA playoff statistics
Year	Team	GP	GS	MPG	FG%	3P%	FT%	RPG	APG	SPG	BPG	TO	PPG
2023	Chicago	2	0	13.0	.333	.333	—	2.0	0.0	0.0	0.0	0.5	2.5
**Career**	1 year, 1 team	2	0	13.0	.333	.333	—	2.0	0.0	0.0	0.0	0.5	2.5

=== College ===
NCAA statistics
Year	Team	GP	Points	FG%	3P%	FT%	RPG	APG	SPG	BPG	PPG
2010–11	VCU	30	91	.369	.000	.707	2.7	0.5	0.4	0.2	3.0
2011–12	VCU	11	73	.375	.000	.591	3.4	1.0	0.7	0.1	6.6
2012–13	VCU	30	560	.470	.083	.744	7.9	1.1	2.6	0.4	18.7°
2013–14	VCU	32	692	.466	.250	.805	9.3	0.8	1.8	0.2	21.6°
**Career**		103	1416	.455	.222	.761	6.3	0.8	1.5	0.2	13.7
