= Morgan Bertsch =

American basketball player (born 1997)

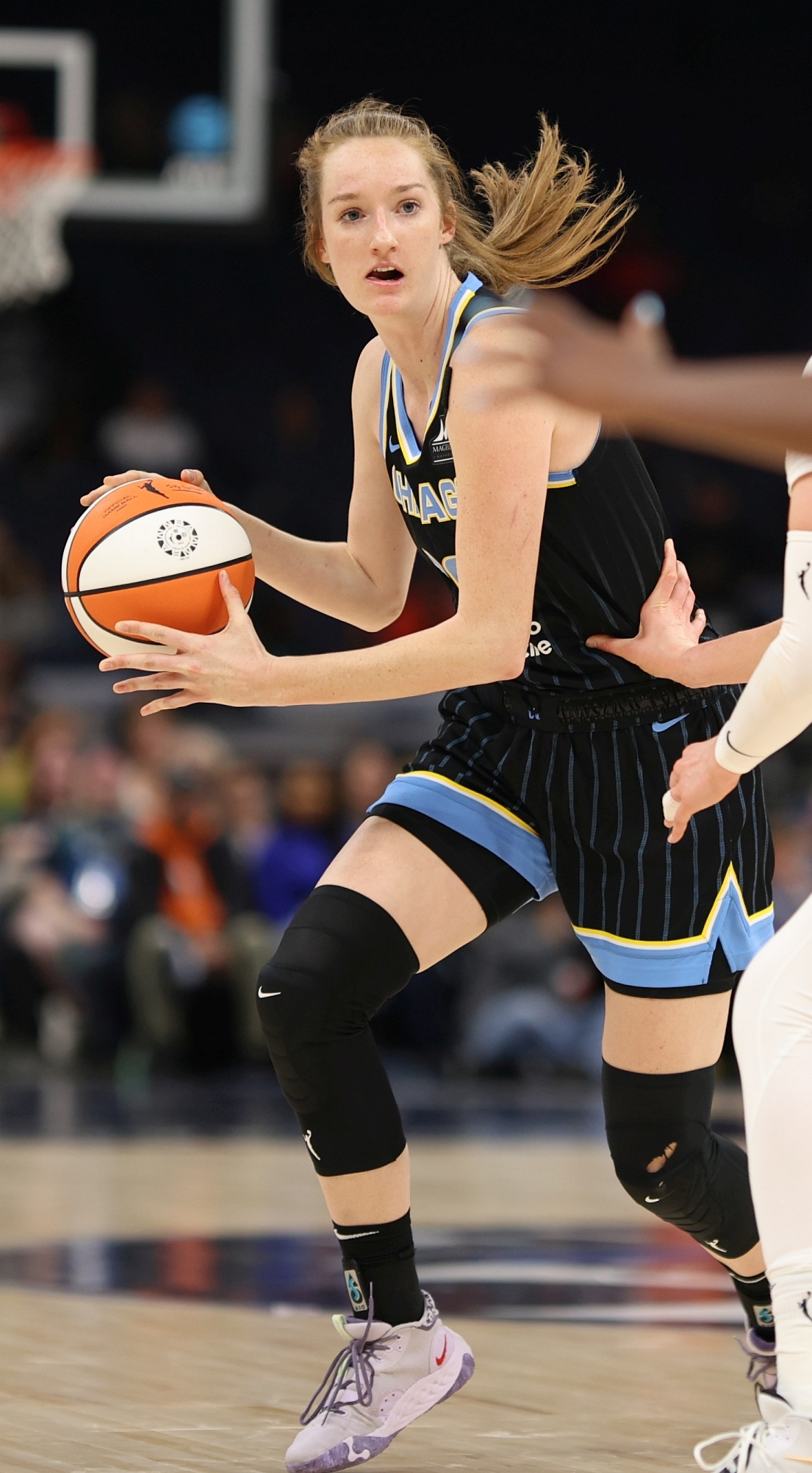
- Bertsch with the Chicago Sky in 2023

Free agent
- Position: Forward

Personal information
- Born: April 20, 1997 (age 29) Santa Rosa, California, U.S.
- Listed height: 6 ft 4 in (1.93 m)
- Listed weight: 173 lb (78 kg)

Career information
- High school: Santa Rosa (Santa Rosa, California)
- College: UC Davis (2014–2019)
- WNBA draft: 2019: 3rd round, 29th overall pick
- Drafted by: Dallas Wings
- Playing career: 2019–present

Career history
- 2019–2020: WBC Sparta&K
- 2020–2021: Polski-Cukier AZS-UMCS Lublin
- 2021–2022: Arka Gdynia
- 2022–2023: Kangoeroes Basket Mechelen
- 2023: Chicago Sky
- 2023–2024: Uni Girona CB
- 2024: Phoenix Mercury
- 2024: Dallas Wings
- 2024–2025: Hozono Global Jairis

Career highlights
- Big West Player of the Year (2019); 3× First-team All-Big West (2017–2019); Big West All-Defensive Team (2019); Second-team All-Big West (2016); Big West All-Freshman Team (2016)
- Stats at Basketball Reference

Morgan Bertsch (born April 20, 1997) is an American professional basketball player who is currently a free agent. She was drafted by the Dallas Wings in the 2019 WNBA draft. She played college basketball at UC Davis.

== Early life ==
Bertsch attended Santa Rosa High School in Santa Rosa, California, where she was a four-year letterwinner on the basketball team. As a junior, she averaged 13.2 points and 11.7 rebounds per game, earning first-team all-North Bay League honors. As a senior, Bertsch averaged 17.3 points, 10.8 rebounds, and 4.5 blocks per game and led the Panthers to a 28–5 record. She set school single-season records for points (536), rebounds (336) and blocks (139). Bertsch was named the North Bay League MVP and The Press Democrat All-Empire Player of the Year. She was also an all-state high jumper on the track and field team. Coming out of high school, Bertsch did not play any AAU basketball and UC Davis was the only Division I school to offer her.

== College career ==
Bertsch played college basketball for the UC Davis Aggies. During her freshman season, she redshirted from the basketball team, but competed for the UC Davis Aggies women's track and field team as a high jumper. Bertsch finished in a tie for fourth at the Big West Conference Championship with a jump of 1.71m (5-07.25 ft). She also competed as a high jumper during her sophomore and junior seasons, finishing fourth and third, respectively at the Big West Championships.

During her redshirt-freshman basketball season, Bertsch made an immediate impact for the Aggies. She broke the program record at the Division I level for points as a freshman and ranked second all-time for freshman at UC Davis. She led the team in scoring and became the 6th ever Aggie to be name to the Big West All-Freshman team. She was also named to the All-Big West Second Team during that season.

Bertsch continued her dominance at UC Davis and in the Big West for the next three years. She was named to the Big West First Team for the next three years (2016–2019). During her senior season, Bertsch became the all-timer scorer at UC Davis for men or women with 2,422 points and had her name all over the records books. Bertsch tied a conference single-season record in March 2019 for earning a sixth Big West Player of the Week award. She was also named the Big West Player of the Year in 2019.

== Professional career ==
=== Dallas Wings (first stint) ===
Bertsch was selected in the third round of the 2019 WNBA draft with the 29th overall pick by the Dallas Wings. In the following years, Bertsch was signed to training camp contracts by the Wings or the Connecticut Sun but was cut before each season.

=== Chicago Sky (first stint) ===
On April 18, 2023, Bertsch signed a training camp contract with the Chicago Sky. Bertsch made it through training camp with the Sky, and was named to the opening day roster for Chicago. She made her first career WNBA start in the Sky's season-opener against the Minnesota Lynx on May 19, 2023. She contributed 6 points, 2 rebounds, and 4 assists, as the Sky won. Bertsch suffered an ankle injury during a May game against the Washington Mystics, returning to play in mid-season.

=== Phoenix Mercury ===
On February 6, 2024, Bertsch along with teammate Kahleah Copper were traded to the Phoenix Mercury for Brianna Turner, Michaela Onyenwere, a 2024 first-round-pick, 2025 second-round-pick, 2026 first-round-pick and a 2026 pick swap. Bertsch's tenure in Phoenix lasted twelve games into the 2024 season before she was waived on June 10, 2024.

=== Dallas Wings (second stint) ===
On June 19, 2024, Bertsch signed a hardship contract with the Wings. She played in three games for the Wings before being released from her hardship contract on June 25, 2024.

=== Chicago Sky (second stint) ===
On Monday, March 3, 2025, the Chicago Sky announced that they had signed a training camp contract with Bertsch. On May 11, she was waived by the Sky.

== Career statistics ==
Legend
GP	Games played	GS	Games started	MPG	Minutes per game	RPG	Rebounds per game
APG	Assists per game	SPG	Steals per game	BPG	Blocks per game	PPG	Points per game
TO	Turnovers per game	FG%	Field-goal percentage	3P%	3-point field-goal percentage	FT%	Free-throw percentage
**Bold**	Career best	°	League leader

=== WNBA ===
==== Regular season ====
Stats current through end of 2024 season

WNBA regular season statistics
Year	Team	GP	GS	MPG	FG%	3P%	FT%	RPG	APG	SPG	BPG	TO	PPG
2019	Did not play (waived)												
2020	Did not play (waived)												
2021	Did not play (waived)												
2022	Did not play (waived)												
2023	Chicago	**28**	**5**	**14.2**	**.456**	**.444**	.750	**1.7**	**0.7**	**0.4**	**0.3**	**1.1**	**4.4**
2024	Phoenix	8	0	9.8	.222	.143	**.875**	1.5	0.3	0.0	0.1	**1.1**	2.6
2024	Dallas	3	0	7.3	.000	.000	.500	**1.7**	0.0	0.3	0.0	1.3	0.3
**Career**	2 years, 3 teams	39	5	12.8	.398	.353	.769	1.6	0.5	0.3	0.2	1.1	3.7

==== Playoffs ====
WNBA playoff statistics
Year	Team	GP	GS	MPG	FG%	3P%	FT%	RPG	APG	SPG	BPG	TO	PPG
2023	Chicago	1	0	5.0	.000	.000	—	0.0	0.0	0.0	0.0	0.0	0.0
**Career**	1 year, 1 team	1	0	5.0	.000	.000	—	0.0	0.0	0.0	0.0	0.0	0.0

=== College ===
NCAA statistics
Year	Team	GP	GS	MPG	FG%	3P%	FT%	RPG	APG	SPG	BPG	TO	PPG
2014–15	UC Davis	Did not play due to injury											
2015–16	UC Davis	32	26	24.8	**.582**	.000	.672	5.0	1.0	1.0	1.1	2.8	13.9
2016–17	UC Davis	33	33	25.9	.505	**.500**	.724	5.2	1.7	0.9	**1.7**	2.6	15.8
2017–18	UC Davis	**35**	**35**	26.3	.560	.429	.781	4.5	1.5	1.0	1.6	2.6	20.1
2018–19	UC Davis	32	32	**27.8**	.496	.479	**.832**	**6.0**	**1.8**	**1.2**	1.4	**2.5**	**23.6**
**Career**		132	126	26.2	.531	.458	.761	5.2	1.5	1.1	1.5	2.6	18.3
