= Taylor Soule =

American basketball player (born 2000)

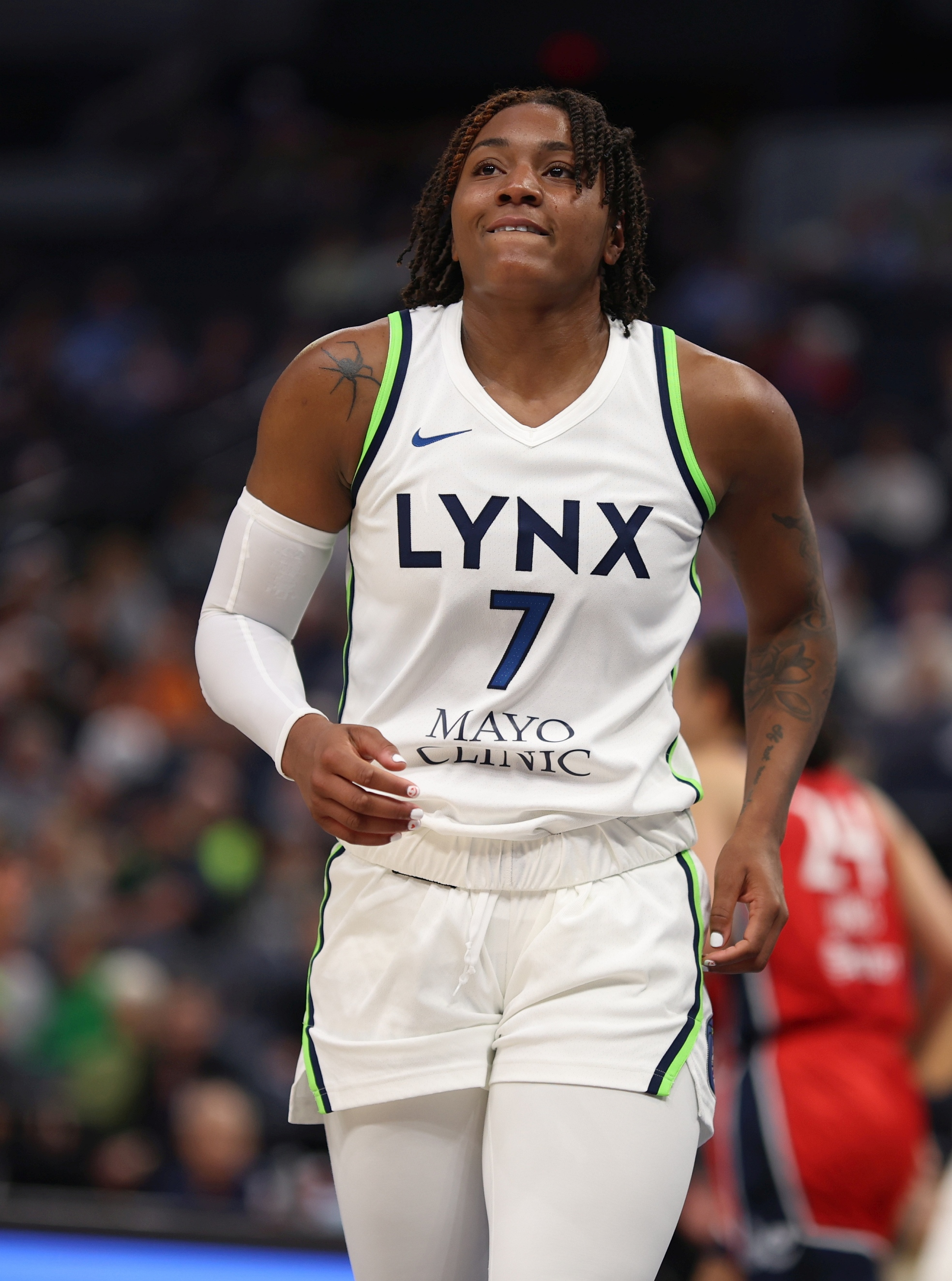
- Soule with the Minnesota Lynx in 2023

Jacksonville Waves
- Position: Forward
- League: WNBA

Personal information
- Born: January 5, 2000 (age 26) West Lebanon, New Hampshire, U.S.
- Listed height: 5 ft 11 in (1.80 m)

Career information
- High school: Kimball Union Academy (Meriden, New Hampshire)
- College: Boston College (2018–2022); Virginia Tech (2022–2023)
- WNBA draft: 2023: 3rd round, 28th overall pick
- Drafted by: Minnesota Lynx
- Playing career: 2023–present

Career history
- 2023: Chicago Sky
- 2024: Minnesota Lynx
- 2026–present: Jacksonville Waves

Career highlights
- All-ACC Second Team (2023); All-ACC Second Team - Coaches (2022); All-ACC First Team - Coaches (2021); 3x All-ACC Second Team - Media (2020, 2021, 2022); All-ACC Honorable Mention - Coaches (2020); ACC Most Improved Player (2020)
- Stats at Basketball Reference

Taylor Soule (born January 5, 2000) is an American professional basketball player for the Jacksonville Waves of the UpShot League. She was drafted in the third round of the 2023 WNBA draft by the Minnesota Lynx. She played college basketball at Boston College and Virginia Tech.

== College career ==
Soule signed to play her college basketball at Boston College. Soule spent four years with the Eagles and was named to the ACC Second Team numerous times during that span. She scored 1,522 points, grabbed 671 rebounds, and had 194 assists during her Boston College years.

Following her senior season, Soule decided that she would transfer and use her extra year elsewhere. She ended up transferring to Virginia Tech.

Prior to the season, Soule was named to both the Cheryl Miller Award Watch List and the Wooden Award Watch List. Soule started every game in her season with the Hokies. She helped guide Virginia Tech to the first ever Final Four in their programs history. Soule was once again named to the All-ACC Second Team for her final season.

== College statistics ==
Year	Team	GP	Points	FG%	3P%	FT%	RPG	APG	SPG	BPG	PPG
2018–19	Boston College	29	229	.538	.000	.616	3.9	1.3	0.8	0.4	7.9
2019–20	Boston College	32	465	.540	.000	.720	7.7	1.3	1.2	0.4	14.5
2020–21	Boston College	19	299	.430	.143	.752	7.0	1.7	1.3	0.3	15.7
2021–22	Boston College	33	529	.513	.182	.683	5.5	2.5	1.5	0.2	16.0
2022–23	Virginia Tech	36	392	.517	.240	.726	5.6	1.7	1.1	0.2	10.9
Career		149	1914	.507	.184	.702	5.9	1.7	1.2	0.3	12.8

== Professional career ==
=== Minnesota Lynx ===
Soule was selected 28th overall in the third round of the 2023 WNBA draft by the Minnesota Lynx. Soule competed in training camp with the Lynx and was one of the last players waived by the Lynx, ultimately not making the roster.

=== Chicago Sky ===
Soule signed a Hardship Contract with the Chicago Sky in June 2023, after the Sky had some injuries and their roster fell below the required number of players. Soule made her WNBA debut on June 9, 2023, recording 1 minute against the Los Angeles Sparks. Soule scored her first WNBA points a few days later against the Las Vegas Aces.

=== Jacksonville Waves ===
On May 11, 2026, the Jacksonville Waves of the UpShot League announced the addition of Soule to their inaugural roster.

== WNBA career statistics ==
Legend
GP	Games played	GS	Games started	MPG	Minutes per game	RPG	Rebounds per game
APG	Assists per game	SPG	Steals per game	BPG	Blocks per game	PPG	Points per game
TO	Turnovers per game	FG%	Field-goal percentage	3P%	3-point field-goal percentage	FT%	Free-throw percentage
**Bold**	Career best	°	League leader

=== Regular season ===
Year	Team	GP	GS	MPG	FG%	3P%	FT%	RPG	APG	SPG	BPG	TO	PPG
2023	Chicago	**15**	0	**3.5**	**.143**	.000	**.625**	**0.5**	**0.2**	0.0	**0.1**	**0.3**	**0.6**
2024	Minnesota	2	0	1.5	—	—	—	**0.5**	0.0	0.0	0.0	0.5	0.0
**Career**	2 years, 2 teams	17	0	3.3	.143	.000	.625	0.5	0.2	0.0	0.1	0.3	0.5

=== Playoffs ===
Year	Team	GP	GS	MPG	FG%	3P%	FT%	RPG	APG	SPG	BPG	TO	PPG
2023	Chicago	1	0	1.0	—	—	—	0.0	0.0	0.0	0.0	0.0	0.0
Career	1 year, 1 team	1	0	1.0	—	—	—	0.0	0.0	0.0	0.0	0.0	0.0
