= Sika Koné =

Malian basketball player (born 2002)

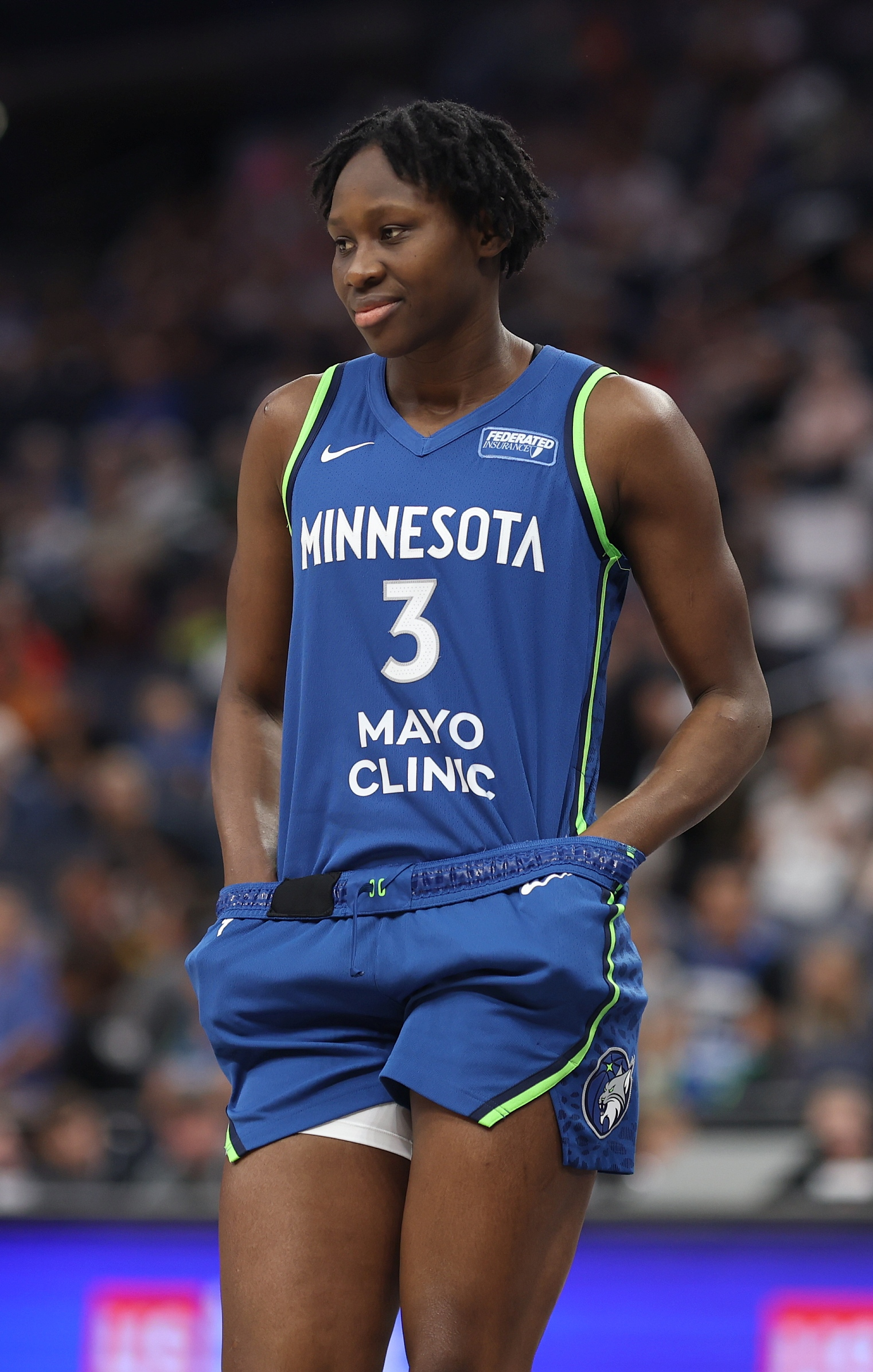
- Koné with the Minnesota Lynx in 2024

No. 23 – Atlanta Dream
- Position: Forward
- League: WNBA

Personal information
- Born: 13 July 2002 (age 24) Bamako, Mali
- Listed height: 1.91 m (6 ft 3 in)
- Listed weight: 82 kg (180 lb)

Career information
- WNBA draft: 2022: 3rd round, 29th overall pick
- Drafted by: New York Liberty
- Playing career: 2019–present

Career history
- 2019–2023: SPAR Gran Canaria
- 2023: Chicago Sky
- 2023–2025: Perfumerías Avenida
- 2024: Minnesota Lynx
- 2024–2025: Washington Mystics
- 2025–present: Atlanta Dream
- 2025–present: CAB Estepona Jardin

Career highlights
- WNBA Commissioner's Cup Champion (2024)
- Stats at Basketball Reference
Medals
Women's basketball
Representing Mali
AfroBasket
Silver medal – second place	2025 Ivory Coast
Bronze medal – third place	2023 Rwanda

Sika Koné (KOH-nay) (born 13 July 2002) is a Malian basketball player for the Atlanta Dream of the Women's National Basketball Association (WNBA) and for CAB Estepona Jardin of the Liga Femenina de Baloncesto. She was selected 29th overall in the 2022 WNBA draft by the New York Liberty.

== Professional career ==
=== Spain ===
Koné started her professional career in Spain in 2019, playing for SPAR Gran Canaria. She played four seasons there.

From 2023 to 2025, Koné played for CB Avenida.

In July 2025, Koné signed CAB Estepona Jardin.

=== WNBA ===
The New York Liberty selected Koné with the 29th overall pick in the third round of the 2022 WNBA draft. She stayed overseas for the 2022 season, then signed her rookie contract and joined the Liberty's training camp ahead of the 2023 season. She did not make the opening day roster and was waived by the Liberty on 16 May 2023.

==== Chicago Sky (2023) ====
The Chicago Sky claimed Koné off waivers on 18 May 2023. She would go on to appear in 20 games for the Sky during the 2023 season and averaged 3.6 points per game, 3.0 rebounds per game, and 0.5 assists per game.

==== Minnesota Lynx (2024) ====
On 14 April 2024, Koné was traded to the Minnesota Lynx alongside the 2024 8th overall pick, a 2025 2nd round pick, and the rights to swap a 2026 1st round pick in exchange for Nikolina Milić and the 7th overall pick in 2024.

==== Washington Mystics (2024–2025) ====
On 20 August 2024, Koné was traded to the Washington Mystics alongside Olivia Époupa and a 2026 second round pick in exchange for Myisha Hines-Allen.

On 5 August 2025, Koné was waived by the Mystics.

=== Atlanta Dream (2025–present) ===
On 17 August 2025, Koné signed with the Atlanta Dream.

== Career statistics ==
Legend
GP	Games played	GS	Games started	MPG	Minutes per game	RPG	Rebounds per game
APG	Assists per game	SPG	Steals per game	BPG	Blocks per game	PPG	Points per game
TO	Turnovers per game	FG%	Field-goal percentage	3P%	3-point field-goal percentage	FT%	Free-throw percentage
**Bold**	Career best	°	League leader

=== WNBA ===
==== Regular season ====
WNBA regular season statistics
Year	Team	GP	GS	MPG	FG%	3P%	FT%	RPG	APG	SPG	BPG	TO	PPG
2023	Chicago	20	0	9.3	**.532**	.333	.769	3.0	.5	.2	.1	1.1	3.6
2024	Minnesota	17	0	3.4	.412	—	.778	.7	.1	.1	.0	.3	1.2
2024	Washington	10	0	**16.0**	.433	**.571**	.889	**4.3**	**1.1**	**.4**	**.2**	.9	**8.6**
2025	Washington	11	0	6.7	.389	.333	.889	1.6	.5	.0	.0	.5	2.1
2025	Atlanta	8	0	1.4	.000	.000	**1.000**	.1	.1	.0	.0	**.0**	.5
2026	Atlanta	**35**	**1**	5.0	.344	.207	.714	1.0	.2	.1	.0	.3	1.8
**Career**	4 years, 4 teams	101	1	6.6	.416	.277	.813	1.7	.3	.1	.0	.5	2.7

==== Playoffs ====
WNBA playoff statistics
Year	Team	GP	GS	MPG	FG%	3P%	FT%	RPG	APG	SPG	BPG	TO	PPG
2023	Chicago	**2**	0	**4.5**	**.667**	—	—	**.5**	**.5**	.0	.0	**.0**	**2.0**
2025	Atlanta	**2**	0	1.5	.000	—	—	**.5**	.0	.0	.0	1.0	.0
**Career**	2 years, 2 teams	4	0	3.0	.500	—	—	.5	.3	.0	.0	.5	1.0
