= Emre Vatansever =

Head Coach in the WNBA

Washington Mystics
- Position: Assistant coach
- League: WNBA

Career information
- College: Marmara University
- Coaching career: 2002–present

Career history

Coaching
- 2002–2007: Migros Basketball (HC/Asst.)
- 2008–2014: Galatasaray (assistant)
- 2015–2017: Seattle Storm (intern)
- 2017–2019: Yakın Doğu Üniversitesi (assistant)
- 2018–2023: Chicago Sky (assistant)
- 2022: Çukurova Basketbol
- 2023: Chicago Sky (interim)
- 2025–present: Washington Mystics (assistant)

Career highlights
- As assistant coach: WNBA champion (2021)

Emre Vatansever is a professional basketball coach who is an assistant coach for the Washington Mystics of the Women's National Basketball Association (WNBA). He got his start in the WNBA serving as a coaching intern for the Seattle Storm, before serving as an assistant and player development coach for the Chicago Sky. He also served as the interim head coach and general manager of the Sky for several months. Vantansever has previously been the head coach at Çukurova Basketbol and an assistant with Yakın Doğu Üniversitesi and Galatasaray.

== Coaching career ==
=== Galatasaray ===
Vatansever spent seven years at Galatsaray as an assistant coach. During his time as assistant with Galatsaray, Vatansever was a part of the teams that won the Turkish Cup in 2010 and the EuroLeague Women's Championship in 2014.

=== Seattle Storm ===
Vatansever’s first coaching job in the WNBA was as a coaching intern on Jenny Boucek’s Seattle Storm staff. Vatansever's time in Seattle included a lot of different roles including being an advance scout for the team.

=== Yakın Doğu Üniversites ===
Vatansever spent two years at Yakın Doğu Üniversites, where he was an assistant coach for the squad.

=== Chicago Sky ===
Vatansever joined the Chicago Sky in 2018 on Amber Stocks's coaching staff as a player development assistant coach. When Stock was let go following the 2018 season, Vatansever was retained when James Wade was hired. Vatansever became the acting head coach for two games in 2022, when Wade was sidelined for COVID. Vatansever helped the Sky go 2-0 during that time.

In the 2023 season, then head coach James Wade stepped down on July 1, 2023 and took an assistant coaching position with the Toronto Raptors. Vatansever was named as the interim head coach and general manager for the Sky - this being his first head coaching stint in the WNBA. He became the first Turkish coach to take on the position of head coach in the WNBA.

After the conclusion of the Chicago Sky’s 2023 season, the Chicago Sky announced that Vatansever will not return as head coach and general manager of their team.

=== Çukurova ===
Vatansever earned his first head-coaching role in 2022 when Çukurova BK in Turkey hired him to be their head coach. His roster included five WNBA players: Chelsea Gray, Briann January, Tiffany Hayes, DeWanna Bonner, and Jonquel Jones. Vatansever held the responsibility of head coach with Çukurova Mersin until early December when the club announced it had parted ways with him.

=== Washington Mystics ===
On 18 March 2025, the Washington Mystics announced that Vatansever had been hired as an assistant coach under head coach Sydney Johnson.

== Head coaching record ==
=== WNBA ===
Legend
Regular season	G	Games coached	W	Games won	L	Games lost	W–L %	Win–loss %
Playoffs	PG	Playoff games	PW	Playoff wins	PL	Playoff losses	PW–L %	Playoff win–loss %

Team	Year	G	W	L	W–L%	Finish	PG	PW	PL	PW–L%	Result
CHI	2023	24	11	13	.458	4th in Eastern	2	0	2	.000	Lost in 1st Round
Career		24	11	13	.458		2	0	2	.000	

== Personal life ==
Vatansever married professional basketball player Kristen Newlin. The couple have three children together.
