= 2024 Connecticut Sun season =

- Head coach: Stephanie White
- Arena: Mohegan Sun Arena; TD Garden

Results
- Record: 28–12 (.700)
- Place: 2nd (Eastern)
- Playoff finish: 2nd seed, Lost in Semifinals to Minnesota 2–3

The 2024 Connecticut Sun season was the 26th season for the Connecticut Sun franchise of the Women's National Basketball Association. It was the 22nd season for the franchise in Connecticut after relocating from Orlando. After both the Phoenix Mercury and Seattle Storm missed the playoffs for the first time since 2012 and 2015 respectively, the Sun entered the season with the longest active playoffs streak for the WNBA, making the playoffs every year since 2017. The Regular season tipped off on Tuesday, May 14, 2024, at home versus the Indiana Fever.

The Sun started the season on a scorching hot streak as they won seven straight games in May to finish the month 7–0. The winning streak included a four-point win over Indiana, a one-point overtime victory over Minnesota and a four-point win over Chicago. The winning streak continued into June as the Sun won their first two games in that month. Their first loss of the season did not come until June 8, when they lost to New York. The Sun won four straight games after that loss. However, they experienced their first rough patch of the season to end June, losing three out of their last four games of the month. Their only win in that stretch came in overtime against Washington. They finished June 7–4. They won the first three games of July before losing to New York. They would defeat Phoenix by twenty-seven points before losing again to New York to enter the Olympic break. They finished July 4–2 and were 18–6 before the Olympic break. The Sun defeated Dallas in the first game back from the break before losing to Atlanta. They would win their next three games, including their first win against New York this season. They lost to Indiana and defeated Washington to finish August 5–2. The win against New York secured the Sun their playoff berth on August 24. The Sun split two games with Seattle to begin September. They lost to Las Vegas before winning three straight games. In their final three games, they lost to Las Vegas and Minnesota before defeating Chicago in the final game of the season. They finished September 5–4 and the season with a 28–12 record. Their twenty-eight wins were the most in franchise history.

The Sun finished in third place overall and were the third seed in the 2024 WNBA Playoffs. They earned home-court advantage against the sixth seed Indiana in the First Round. They dominated game one of the series, winning 93–69. Game two was closer, but the Sun prevailed 87–81 to win the series two games to zero. They advanced to the Semifinals where they faced Minnesota. The Sun won game one in Minnesota 73–70. They would lose games two and three 70–74 and 81–90 respectively to come within one game of elimination. The Sun won game four at home 92–82 to force a game five. Minnesota got off to a hot start in the fifth game and the Sun could not overcome the deficit, losing 77–88 to end their season.

== Transactions ==
=== WNBA draft ===
Round	Pick	Player	Nationality	School/Team/Country
1	10	Leïla Lacan	France	Angers (France)
2	19	Taiyanna Jackson	United States	Kansas
2	22	Helena Pueyo	Spain	Arizona
3	34	Abbey Hsu	United States	Columbia

=== Transactions ===
Date	Details
December 12, 2023	Tiffany Hayes announced her retirement
January 18, 2024	Cored Brionna Jones
January 18, 2024	Extended qualifying offers to Kianna Smith and Bernadett Határ
January 31, 2024	Acquired Tiffany Mitchell and the 19th pick in the 2024 draft from Minnesota Lynx in exchange for Natisha Hiedeman
February 1, 2024	Signed Rachel Banham
February 2, 2024	Signed Rennia Davis, Kianna Smith, and Sydney Wiese to training camp contracts
February 3, 2024	Acquired Moriah Jefferson from the Phoenix Mercury in exchange for Rebecca Allen
February 3, 2024	Signed Astou Ndour-Fall
February 5, 2024	Re-signed Brionna Jones
February 6, 2024	Re-signed DeWanna Bonner
February 16, 2024	Signed Shey Peddy to a training camp contract
February 19, 2024	Signed Jocelyn Willoughby to a training camp contract
April 16, 2024	Signed Helena Pueyo and Taiyanna Jackson to rookie contracts
May 1, 2024	Waived Kianna Smith
May 5, 2024	Waived Leigha Brown, Rennia Davis, and Shey Peddy
May 7, 2024	Acquired Queen Egbo from the Washington Mystics in exchange for Bernadett Határ and the Sun's second-round 2025 draft pick
May 10, 2024	Waived Helena Pueyo and Taiyanna Jackson
May 13, 2024	Waived Sydney Wiese and Jocelyn Willoughby
May 15, 2024	Exercised 4th-year team option on Olivia Nelson-Ododa
June 5, 2024	Waived Queen Egbo
June 5, 2024	Signed Veronica Burton
July 17, 2024	Traded Rachel Banham, Moriah Jefferson, a first-round 2025 draft pick, and the rights to swap 2026 first-round draft picks to Chicago Sky in exchange for Marina Mabrey and Chicago's second-round 2025 draft pick.
July 20, 2024	Signed Caitlin Bickle to a 7-day hardship contract.
August 16, 2024	Signed Celeste Taylor to a 7-day hardship contract.
August 22, 2024	Released Caitlin Bickle from first 7-day hardship contract, and resigned Bickle to a second hardship contract.
August 30, 2024	Signed Caitlin Bickle.

=== Roster changes ===
==== Additions ====
Personnel	Signed/Trade	Former team
Rachel Banham	Signed	Minnesota Lynx
Veronica Burton	Signed	Dallas Wings
Queen Egbo	Trade	Washington Mystics
Abbey Hsu	Draft	Columbia
Taiyanna Jackson	Draft	Kansas
Moriah Jefferson	Trade	Phoenix Mercury
Leïla Lacan	Draft	Angers
Marina Mabrey	Trade	Chicago Sky
Tiffany Mitchell	Trade	Minnesota Lynx
Astou Ndour-Fall	Signed	Chicago Sky
Helena Pueyo	Draft	Arizona

==== Subtractions ====
Personnel	Reason	New team
Rebecca Allen	Trade	Phoenix Mercury
Rachel Banham	Trade	Chicago Sky
Leigha Brown	Waived	—
Queen Egbo	Waived	Los Angeles Sparks
Bernadett Határ	Trade	Washington Mystics
Tiffany Hayes	Retired	
Natisha Hiedeman	Trade	Minnesota Lynx
Taiyanna Jackson	Waived	—
Moriah Jefferson	Trade	Chicago Sky
Helena Pueyo	Waived	—

== Roster ==
2024 Connecticut Sun roster
Players
Coaches

Pos.	No.	Nat.	Name	Height	Weight	DOB	From	Yrs
F	51	(United States)	Bickle, Caitlin	6' 1" (1.85m)		2000-05-05	Baylor	R
G/F	24	(North Macedonia)	Bonner, DeWanna	6' 4" (1.93m)	143 lb (65kg)	1987-08-21	Auburn	14
G	22	(United States)	Burton, Veronica	5' 9" (1.75m)	155 lb (70kg)	2000-07-12	Northwestern	2
G/F	21	(United States)	Carrington, DiJonai	5' 11" (1.8m)	175 lb (79kg)	1998-01-08	Baylor	3
G	52	(United States)	Harris, Tyasha	5' 10" (1.78m)	152 lb (69kg)	1998-05-01	South Carolina	4
C	42	(United States)	Jones, Brionna	6' 3" (1.91m)	210 lb (95kg)	1995-12-18	Maryland	7
G	4	(United States)	Mabrey, Marina	5' 11" (1.8m)	170 lb (77kg)	1996-09-14	Notre Dame	5
G	3	(United States)	Mitchell, Tiffany (injured)	5' 9" (1.75m)	152 lb (69kg)	1994-09-23	South Carolina	8
F/C	45	(Spain)	Ndour-Fall, Astou	6' 5" (1.96m)	169 lb (77kg)	1994-08-22	Spain	6
C	10	(United States)	Nelson-Ododa, Olivia	6' 5" (1.96m)	173 lb (78kg)	2000-08-17	Connecticut	2
F	25	(United States)	Thomas, Alyssa	6' 2" (1.88m)	185 lb (84kg)	1992-04-12	Maryland	10
G		(United States)	Hsu, Abbey (DP)	5' 11" (1.8m)		2001-03-22	Columbia
G		(France)	Lacan, Leïla (DP)	5' 11" (1.8m)		2004-06-02	France

Head coach
(United States) Stephanie White (Purdue)
Assistant coaches
(United States) Briann January (Arizona State)
(United States) Austin Kelly (Duke)
(United States) Abi Olajuwon (Oklahoma)
Athletic trainer
(United States) Nicole Alexander
Strength and conditioning coach
(United States) Analisse Rios

Legend

- (C) Team captain
- (DP) Unsigned draft pick
- (FA) Free agent
- (S) Suspended
- Injured

=== Depth chart ===
Pos.	Starter	Bench
PG	Tyasha Harris	Marina Mabrey
SG	DiJonai Carrington
SF	DeWanna Bonner	Tiffany Mitchell
PF	Alyssa Thomas	Astou Ndour-Fall
C	Brionna Jones	Olivia Nelson-Ododa

== Schedule ==
=== Pre-season ===
2024 pre-season game log
Total: 0–1 (Home: 0–1; Road: 0–0)
May: 0–1 (Home: 0–1; Road: 0–0)

Game	Date	Team	Score	High points	High rebounds	High assists	Location Attendance	Record
1	May 9	New York	L 79–82	Rachel Banham (20)	Tied (5)	Alyssa Thomas (7)	Mohegan Sun Arena; 5,617	0–1

2024 pre-season schedule

=== Regular season ===
2024 game log
Total: 28–12 (Home: 14–6; Road: 14–6)
May: 7–0 (Home: 5–0; Road: 2–0)

Game	Date	Team	Score	High points	High rebounds	High assists	Location Attendance	Record
1	May 14	Indiana	W 92–71	DeWanna Bonner (20)	Alyssa Thomas (10)	Alyssa Thomas (13)	Mohegan Sun Arena; 8,910	1–0
2	May 17	Washington	W 84–77	DeWanna Bonner (22)	Alyssa Thomas (11)	Alyssa Thomas (6)	Mohegan Sun Arena; 6,874	2–0
3	May 20	@ Indiana	W 88–84	Alyssa Thomas (24)	Alyssa Thomas (14)	Alyssa Thomas (9)	Gainbridge Fieldhouse; 17,274	3–0
4	May 23	Minnesota	W 83–82 (OT)	DeWanna Bonner (20)	Alyssa Thomas (7)	Jones, Thomas (5)	Mohegan Sun Arena; 6,152	4–0
5	May 25	@ Chicago	W 86–82	DeWanna Bonner (19)	DeWanna Bonner (8)	Alyssa Thomas (6)	Wintrust Arena; 9,025	5–0
6	May 28	Phoenix	W 70–47	DeWanna Bonner (19)	DiJonai Carrington (10)	Alyssa Thomas (8)	Mohegan Sun Arena; 6,489	6–0
7	May 31	Dallas	W 74–72	Brionna Jones (22)	Alyssa Thomas (9)	Alyssa Thomas (14)	Mohegan Sun Arena; 7,638	7–0

June : 7–4 (Home: 3–2; Road: 4–2)

Game	Date	Team	Score	High points	High rebounds	High assists	Location Attendance	Record
8	June 2	@ Atlanta	W 69–50	DeWanna Bonner (18)	Alyssa Thomas (14)	Alyssa Thomas (11)	Gateway Center Arena; 3,265	8–0
9	June 4	Washington	W 76–59	DeWanna Bonner (20)	DeWanna Bonner (8)	Alyssa Thomas (7)	Mohegan Sun Arena; 5,346	9–0
10	June 8	New York	L 75–82	DeWanna Bonner (16)	Alyssa Thomas (12)	Alyssa Thomas (7)	Mohegan Sun Arena; 8,910	9–1
11	June 10	Indiana	W 89–72	DiJonai Carrington (22)	Alyssa Thomas (18)	Alyssa Thomas (7)	Mohegan Sun Arena; 8,910	10–1
12	June 12	@ Chicago	W 83–75	Alyssa Thomas (20)	DeWanna Bonner (8)	Tyasha Harris (7)	Wintrust Arena; 7,815	11–1
13	June 15	@ Dallas	W 85–67	Rachel Banham (16)	Alyssa Thomas (9)	Alyssa Thomas (9)	College Park Center; 5,977	12–1
14	June 18	Los Angeles	W 79–70	DeWanna Bonner (16)	Bonner, Thomas (7)	Alyssa Thomas (7)	Mohegan Sun Arena; 7,853	13–1
15	June 21	@ Las Vegas	L 74–85	DiJonai Carrington (19)	Brionna Jones (7)	Alyssa Thomas (7)	Michelob Ultra Arena; 10,385	13–2
16	June 23	@ Seattle	L 61–72	Jones, Thomas (14)	Alyssa Thomas (14)	Alyssa Thomas (3)	Climate Pledge Arena; 9,935	13–3
17	June 27	@ Washington	W 94–91 (OT)	DeWanna Bonner (24)	DeWanna Bonner (10)	Alyssa Thomas (6)	Entertainment and Sports Arena; 4,200	14–3
18	June 28	Atlanta	L 74–78	DeWanna Bonner (17)	Alyssa Thomas (7)	Alyssa Thomas (8)	Mohegan Sun Arena; 7,008	14–4

July : 4–2 (Home: 2–1; Road: 2–1)

Game	Date	Team	Score	High points	High rebounds	High assists	Location Attendance	Record
19	July 1	@ Phoenix	W 83–72	Brionna Jones (18)	Alyssa Thomas (12)	Alyssa Thomas (6)	Footprint Center; 8,445	15–4
20	July 4	@ Minnesota	W 78–73	DeWanna Bonner (24)	Alyssa Thomas (10)	Alyssa Thomas (14)	Target Center; 7,508	16–4
21	July 7	Atlanta	W 80–67	DeWanna Bonner (23)	Alyssa Thomas (7)	Alyssa Thomas (9)	Mohegan Sun Arena; 7,527	17–4
22	July 10	New York	L 68–71	DeWanna Bonner (22)	Bonner, Thomas (9)	Alyssa Thomas (8)	Mohegan Sun Arena; 8,910	17–5
23	July 14	Phoenix	W 96–69	Rachel Banham (24)	DiJonai Carrington (11)	Tyasha Harris (7)	Mohegan Sun Arena; 8,910	18–5
24	July 16	@ New York	L 74–82	Brionna Jones (17)	Bonner, Thomas (8)	Alyssa Thomas (5)	Barclays Center; 13,694	18–6

August : 5–2 (Home: 2–0; Road: 3–2)

Game	Date	Team	Score	High points	High rebounds	High assists	Location Attendance	Record
25	August 16	@ Dallas	W 109–91	DeWanna Bonner (29)	Alyssa Thomas (8)	Alyssa Thomas (14)	College Park Center; 6,191	19–6
26	August 18	@ Atlanta	L 70–82	Alyssa Thomas (13)	DeWanna Bonner (10)	Alyssa Thomas (6)	Gateway Center Arena; 3,330	19–7
27	August 20	Los Angeles	W 69–61	DiJonai Carrington (19)	Alyssa Thomas (12)	Alyssa Thomas (8)	TD Garden; 19,125	20–7
28	August 23	Chicago	W 82–80	Marina Mabrey (24)	Alyssa Thomas (9)	Alyssa Thomas (11)	Mohegan Sun Arena; 8,910	21–7
29	August 24	@ New York	W 72–64	Marina Mabrey (15)	DeWanna Bonner (12)	Alyssa Thomas (8)	Barclays Center; 13,098	22–7
30	August 28	@ Indiana	L 80–84	DiJonai Carrington (19)	DeWanna Bonner (8)	Alyssa Thomas (6)	Gainbridge Fieldhouse; 17,274	22–8
31	August 31	@ Washington	W 96–85	Marina Mabrey (21)	Marina Mabrey (6)	Tyasha Harris (6)	Entertainment and Sports Arena; 4,200	23–8

September : 5–4 (Home: 2–3; Road: 3–1)

Game	Date	Team	Score	High points	High rebounds	High assists	Location Attendance	Record
32	September 1	Seattle	W 93–86	Brionna Jones (26)	Alyssa Thomas (8)	Alyssa Thomas (8)	Mohegan Sun Arena; 8,910	24–8
33	September 3	Seattle	L 64–71	DeWanna Bonner (26)	Bonner, Carrington (7)	Harris, Thomas (7)	Mohegan Sun Arena; 7,454	24–9
34	September 6	Las Vegas	L 67–72	Brionna Jones (17)	Alyssa Thomas (10)	Alyssa Thomas (8)	Mohegan Sun Arena; 8,910	24–10
35	September 8	@ Los Angeles	W 79–67	Brionna Jones (21)	Alyssa Thomas (10)	Alyssa Thomas (11)	Crypto.com Arena; 10,627	25–10
36	September 10	@ Los Angeles	W 86–66	Marina Mabrey (26)	Alyssa Thomas (11)	Alyssa Thomas (12)	Crypto.com Arena; 8,253	26–10
37	September 13	@ Phoenix	W 88–69	Brionna Jones (20)	Carrington, Jones (9)	Alyssa Thomas (11)	Footprint Center; 14,190	27–10
38	September 15	@ Las Vegas	L 71–84	Marina Mabrey (18)	Brionna Jones (9)	Alyssa Thomas (7)	Michelob Ultra Arena; 10,431	27–11
39	September 17	Minnesota	L 76–78	Alyssa Thomas (18)	Jones, Thomas (8)	Alyssa Thomas (10)	Mohegan Sun Arena; 8,174	27–12
40	September 19	Chicago	W 87–54	Tyasha Harris (15)	DiJonai Carrington (12)	Alyssa Thomas (7)	Mohegan Sun Arena; 8,092	28–12

2024 season schedule

=== Playoffs ===
2024 playoff game log
First round vs. Indiana Fever
Won Series: 2–0

Game	Date	Team	Score	High points	High rebounds	High assists	Location Attendance	Series
1	September 22	Indiana	W 93–69	Marina Mabrey (27)	Alyssa Thomas (10)	Alyssa Thomas (13)	Mohegan Sun Arena; 8,910	1–0
2	September 25	Indiana	W 87–81	Alyssa Thomas (19)	DeWanna Bonner (8)	Alyssa Thomas (13)	Mohegan Sun Arena; 8,910	2–0

Semifinals vs. Minnesota Lynx
Lost Series: 2–3

Game	Date	Team	Score	High points	High rebounds	High assists	Location Attendance	Series
1	September 29	@ Minnesota	W 73–70	Marina Mabrey (20)	DeWanna Bonner (11)	Alyssa Thomas (9)	Target Center; 8,506	1–0
2	October 1	@ Minnesota	L 70–74	Alyssa Thomas (18)	Alyssa Thomas (10)	Alyssa Thomas (7)	Target Center; 8,796	1–1
3	October 4	Minnesota	L 81–90	Brionna Jones (21)	Alyssa Thomas (9)	Alyssa Thomas (7)	Mohegan Sun Arena; 8,268	1–2
4	October 6	Minnesota	W 92–82	Tyasha Harris (20)	Bonner, Thomas (8)	Alyssa Thomas (11)	Mohegan Sun Arena; 7,849	2–2
5	October 8	@ Minnesota	L 77–88	DiJonai Carrington (17)	DiJonai Carrington (12)	Alyssa Thomas (6)	Target Center; 8,769	2–3

2024 playoff schedule

== Standings ==
#	Team	W	L	PCT	GB	Conf.	Home	Road	Cup
1	yx – New York Liberty	32	8	.800	—	16–4	16–4	16–4	5–0
2	cx – Minnesota Lynx	30	10	.750	2	14–6	16–4	14–6	4–1
3	x – Connecticut Sun	28	12	.700	4	14–6	14–6	14–6	4–1
4	x – Las Vegas Aces	27	13	.675	5	12–8	13–7	14–6	2–3
5	x – Seattle Storm	25	15	.625	7	13–7	14–6	11–9	4–1
6	x – Indiana Fever	20	20	.500	12	11–9	12–8	8–12	3–2
7	x – Phoenix Mercury	19	21	.475	13	10–10	10–10	9–11	3–2
8	x – Atlanta Dream	15	25	.375	17	7–13	8–12	7–13	1–4
9	e – Washington Mystics	14	26	.350	18	7–13	5–15	9–11	1–4
10	e – Chicago Sky	13	27	.325	19	5–15	6–14	7–13	1–4
11	e – Dallas Wings	9	31	.225	23	6–14	7–13	2–18	0–5
12	e – Los Angeles Sparks	8	32	.200	24	5–15	5–15	3–17	2–3

Notes

(#) – League Standing
c – Commissioner's Cup winners
y – Regular Season Champion
x – Clinched playoff berth
e – Eliminated from playoff contention
Source: Overall standings and Commissioner's Cup Standings

== Playoffs ==
**First round** Best-of-3
**1**	**New York Liberty**	**2**
8	Atlanta Dream	0
**4**	**Las Vegas Aces**	**2**
5	Seattle Storm	0
2	**Minnesota Lynx**	**2**
7	Phoenix Mercury	0
3	**Connecticut Sun**	**2**
6	Indiana Fever	0

**Semifinals**; Best-of-5
1	**New York Liberty**	**3**
4	Las Vegas Aces	1
2	**Minnesota Lynx**	**3**
3	Connecticut Sun	2

**Finals**; Best-of-5
1	**New York Liberty**	**3**
2	Minnesota Lynx	2

- **Bold** – Series winner
- Italic – Team with home-court-advantage

== Statistics ==
Legend
GP	Games played	GS	Games started	MPG	Minutes per game	RPG	Rebounds per game
APG	Assists per game	SPG	Steals per game	BPG	Blocks per game	PPG	Points per game
FG%	Field-goal percentage	3P%	3-point field-goal percentage	FT%	Free-throw percentage	TO	Turnovers per game
PF	Fouls per game		Team leader		League leader

=== Regular season ===
Player	GP	GS	MPG	FG%	3P%	FT%	RPG	APG	SPG	BPG	TO	PF	PPG
DeWanna Bonner	40	39	31.8	.414	.294	.832	6.0	2.0	1.2	0.7	1.4	1.8	15.0
Marina Mabrey ^{≠}	16	3	27.4	.467	.424	.682	3.5	3.3	1.0	0.6	1.7	2.5	14.9
Brionna Jones	40	40	27.2	.539	.143	.738	5.5	1.5	1.2	0.6	1.3	2.7	13.7
DiJonai Carrington	39	39	29.6	.403	.250	.790	5.0	1.6	1.6	0.4	1.9	2.6	12.7
Alyssa Thomas	40	40	32.4	.509	.000	.628	8.4	7.9	1.6	0.5	3.6	2.1	10.6
Tyasha Harris	39	38	28.8	.425	.395	.766	1.8	3.1	1.0	0.3	1.4	1.7	10.5
Tiffany Mitchell	24	0	16.3	.349	.250	.783	1.5	0.8	0.5	0.0	0.6	1.2	4.9
Rachel Banham ^{†}	21	0	12.9	.358	.348	.900	1.2	0.7	0.4	0.2	0.5	1.5	4.8
Olivia Nelson-Ododa	37	0	11.8	.495	—	.659	2.5	0.2	0.4	0.6	0.8	1.7	3.4
Veronica Burton ^{≠}	31	1	12.6	.361	.351	.838	1.4	1.9	0.5	0.2	0.5	1.0	3.1
Moriah Jefferson ^{†}	9	0	6.8	.375	.333	1.000	0.2	0.7	0.7	0.0	0.2	0.9	2.1
Astou Ndour-Fall	22	0	4.2	.346	.200	.833	0.8	0.0	0.0	0.2	0.1	0.5	1.1
Celeste Taylor ^{≠} ^{‡}	2	0	5.5	1.000	—	—	0.0	0.0	0.0	0.0	0.0	2.0	1.0
Queen Egbo ^{‡}	3	0	2.3	.000	—	1.000	0.7	0.0	0.0	0.0	0.0	0.3	0.7
Caitlin Bickle ^{≠}	8	0	1.9	.000	.000	—	0.0	0.0	0.0	0.0	0.0	0.1	0.0

^{‡}Waived/Released during the season
^{†}Traded during the season
^{≠}Acquired during the season

=== Playoffs ===
Player	GP	GS	MPG	FG%	3P%	FT%	RPG	APG	SPG	BPG	TO	PF	PPG
DeWanna Bonner	7	7	33.4	.396	.378	.929	7.9	2.9	1.9	0.6	1.4	1.6	16.0
Marina Mabrey	7	4	33.0	.368	.339	.923	3.0	2.6	0.1	0.9	1.9	2.6	15.9
Alyssa Thomas	7	7	38.7	.495	.000	.778	7.9	9.4	1.0	0.0	2.6	2.4	14.9
DiJonai Carrington	7	7	33.6	.439	.231	.778	6.1	2.0	1.7	0.6	1.7	2.0	13.7
Brionna Jones	7	7	19.9	.482	.000	.769	3.6	1.4	0.6	0.6	2.0	2.1	9.1
Tyasha Harris	5	3	16.4	.500	.600	1.000	0.8	0.2	0.2	0.0	0.6	0.8	6.4
Veronica Burton	7	0	19.3	.323	.231	.846	1.1	1.9	0.6	0.4	0.7	1.4	4.9
Olivia Nelson-Ododa	7	0	9.7	.667	—	1.000	3.0	0.0	0.4	0.4	0.1	0.6	2.9
Caitlin Bickle	3	0	1.0	—	—	—	0.3	0.0	0.0	0.0	0.0	0.0	0.0
Astou Ndour-Fall	3	0	1.0	—	—	—	0.0	0.3	0.0	0.0	0.0	0.0	0.0

== Awards and honors ==
Recipient	Award	Date awarded	Ref.
DeWanna Bonner	Eastern Conference Player of the Week	May 28, 2024	
DeWanna Bonner	WNBA All-Star	July 2, 2024	
DiJonai Carrington	Most Improved Player	September 25, 2024	
DiJonai Carrington	WNBA All-Defensive First Team	September 29, 2024	
Brionna Jones	WNBA All-Star	July 2, 2024	
Alyssa Thomas	Eastern Conference Player of the Week	May 21, 2024	
Alyssa Thomas	Eastern Conference Player of the Month – May	June 3, 2024	
Alyssa Thomas	WNBA All-Star	July 2, 2024	
Alyssa Thomas	AP All-WNBA First Team	September 22, 2024	
Alyssa Thomas	WNBA All-Defensive First Team	September 29, 2024	
Alyssa Thomas	All-WNBA First Team	October 16, 2024	
Stephanie White	WNBA Coach of the Month – May	June 3, 2024	
