= Caitlin Bickle =

American basketball player (born 2000)

Free agent
- Position: Forward

Personal information
- Born: May 5, 2000 (age 26) Cave Creek, Arizona, U.S.
- Listed height: 6 ft 1 in (1.85 m)

Career information
- High school: Cactus Shadows (Cave Creek, Arizona)
- College: Baylor (2018–2023)
- WNBA draft: 2023: undrafted
- Playing career: 2023–2024

Career history
- 2023–2024: Eleftheria Moschatou
- 2024: Connecticut Sun

Career highlights
- NCAA champion (2019); Second-team All-Big 12 (2023); Big 12 All-Defensive team (2023); Big 12 All-Freshman team (2019)
- Stats at WNBA.com
- Stats at Basketball Reference

Caitlin Bickle (born May 5, 2000) is an American professional basketball player who is currently a free agent. Bickle played college basketball for the Baylor Bears. She was signed by the Connecticut Sun of the Women's National Basketball Association (WNBA) as an undrafted free agent in 2023.

== Early life ==
Bickle grew up playing basketball, softball, and soccer, as well as competing in equestrian events. She especially credits horse-riding with helping her to build the strength and balance to help her succeed at basketball. She attended and played basketball at Cactus Shadows High School in Cave Creek, Arizona; rated a five-star prospect and the 29th-best prospect nationally by ESPN, Bickle committed to Baylor over Cal, Michigan, and Louisville. An ACL injury forced her to miss her senior season of basketball.

== College career ==
Bickle was named to the Big 12 All-Rookie team in her freshman season, averaging 2.0 points and 1.1 rebounds per game and playing in 28 games as Baylor won the 2019 national championship tournament. She averaged 2.8 points, 2.1 rebounds, and 0.8 assists per game in her sophomore season, in which a knee injury forced her to miss about a month of games. In her junior season she averaged 4.6 points, 4.4 rebounds, and 0.9 assists per game; she contributed six points in a win in the second round of the 2021 national championship tournament against Virginia Tech. She averaged 7.4 points, 4.3 rebounds, and 1.9 assists per game in her senior season, scoring 21 points in a win against Oklahoma in the 2022 Big 12 Conference women's basketball tournament.

Bickle returned to Baylor for a fifth season. She missed the beginning of the season due to injury but went on to start in 30 games. She recorded six double-doubles and averaged 11.9 points, 7.1 rebounds, and 2.7 assists per game, including 30 points in a game against Oklahoma. Texas Tech head coach Krista Gerlich, after a loss to Baylor, called Bickle "one of the best players in the conference" while Baylor head coach Nicki Collen called her "ultimate safety on defense and quarterback on offense." Bickle went on to be awarded second-team All-Big 12 and Big 12 All-Defensive team honors. She was also named to the academic All-Big 12 first team in each of her last four seasons.

She declared for the 2023 WNBA draft at the conclusion of her fifth college season. She earned a master's degree in sports management from Baylor.

== Professional career ==
Bickle was not selected in the 2023 WNBA draft, but she signed a training camp contract with the Connecticut Sun on April 11, 2023. She was waived by the Sun before the start of the regular season.

Bickle spent the 2023–2024 season playing for Eleftheria Moschatou of the Greek Women's Basketball League, where she averaged 22.1 points, 10.9 rebounds, and 4.2 assists per game. She signed a seven-day contract with the Sun on July 20, 2024 – the first of several such contracts until the Sun signed her to a rest-of-season contract on September 2.

She was re-signed to another training camp contract with the Sun on January 22, 2025. On May 8, 2025, she was waived by the Sun.

== Career statistics ==
Legend
GP	Games played	GS	Games started	MPG	Minutes per game	RPG	Rebounds per game
APG	Assists per game	SPG	Steals per game	BPG	Blocks per game	PPG	Points per game
TO	Turnovers per game	FG%	Field-goal percentage	3P%	3-point field-goal percentage	FT%	Free-throw percentage
**Bold**	Career best	°	League leader

*	Denotes season(s) in which Bickle won an NCAA Championship

=== WNBA ===
==== Regular season ====
Stats current through end of 2024 season

WNBA regular season statistics
Year	Team	GP	GS	MPG	FG%	3P%	FT%	RPG	APG	SPG	BPG	TO	PPG
2024	Connecticut	8	0	1.9	.000	.000	—	0.0	0.0	0.0	0.0	0.0	0.0
**Career**	1 year, 1 team	8	0	1.9	.000	.000	—	0.0	0.0	0.0	0.0	0.0	0.0

==== Playoffs ====
WNBA playoffs statistics
Year	Team	GP	GS	MPG	FG%	3P%	FT%	RPG	APG	SPG	BPG	TO	PPG
2024	Connecticut	3	0	1.0	—	—	—	0.3	0.0	0.0	0.0	0.0	0.0
**Career**	1 year, 1 team	3	0	1.0	—	—	—	0.3	0.0	0.0	0.0	0.0	0.0

=== College ===
NCAA statistics
Year	Team	GP	GS	MPG	FG%	3P%	FT%	RPG	APG	SPG	BPG	TO	PPG
2018–19*	Baylor	28	0	5.8	.452	**.429**	.667	1.1	0.3	0.4	0.1	**0.5**	2.0
2019–20	Baylor	26	0	9.1	**.558**	.273	.647	2.1	0.8	0.2	0.2	0.6	2.8
2020–21	Baylor	29	1	14.4	.485	.346	.794	4.4	0.9	0.5	0.3	0.7	4.6
2021–22	Baylor	**35**	1	23.2	.463	.185	.784	4.3	1.9	0.5	0.3	1.5	7.4
2022–23	Baylor	30	**30**	**29.6**	.502	.382	**.806**	**7.1**	**2.7**	**0.9**	**0.5**	2.6	**11.9**
**Career**		148	32	17.0	.488	.306	.776	3.9	1.4	0.5	0.3	1.2	5.9
