= 2024 Washington Mystics season =

- Head coach: Eric Thibault
- Arena: Entertainment and Sports Arena

Results
- Record: 14–26 (.350)
- Place: 5th (Eastern)
- Playoff finish: Did not qualify

The 2024 Washington Mystics season was the franchise's 27th season in the Women's National Basketball Association, and their second season under head coach Eric Thibault.

The season tipped off on Tuesday, May 14, 2024, at home against the New York Liberty. The Mystics lost the game by five-points, and the opening month of May did not improve much after that. The Mystics went on to lose all eight games they played in May, with the closest being a three-point loss to the Phoenix Mercury on May 23. The Mystics' losing streak continued through twelve games and they won their first game of the season on June 11, versus the Atlanta Dream. Including that win, the Mystics won four out of their next five games, with the only loss coming against Indiana. They lost their last two games of the month, including an overtime contest against Connecticut. They finished the month 4–7. Their fortunes did not improve in July, as they finished 2–4 before the league went into its Olympic break. The Mystics lost the first three games out of the break, but then won the next three, including a two point win at Seattle and a four-point road win over Chicago. They could not win their final game of the month and finished with a 3–4 record in August. The Mystics were a greatly improved team in September, as they won four out of their first five games of the month to draw within reaching distance of the eighth playoff seed. However, they lost the next game to fellow 8th seed contenders Atlanta, and then lost two days later to New York, a loss which allowed New York to clinch the first overall seed. The Mystics finished their season with a one-point win over Indiana. The Mystics finished ninth overall with a record of 14–26.

== Transactions ==
=== WNBA draft ===
Round	Pick	Player	Nationality	School/Team/Country
1	6	Aaliyah Edwards	Canada	UConn
2	21	Kaylynne Truong	United States	Gonzaga
3	30	Nastja Claessens	Belgium	Castors Braine (Belgium)

=== Transactions ===
Date	Transaction
January 11, 2024	Extended a Qualifying Offer to Li Meng
January 13, 2024	Cored Elena Delle Donne
February 1, 2024	Signed Karlie Samuelson
February 1, 2024	Signed Elissa Cunane to a Training Camp Contract
February 1, 2024	Signed Emily Engstler to a Training Camp Contract
February 1, 2024	Signed DiDi Richards to a Training Camp Contract
February 1, 2024	Signed Julie Vanloo to a Training Camp Contract
March 12, 2024	Signed Stefanie Dolson
April 17, 2024	Signed Kaylynne Truong, Honesty Scott-Grayson, and Jakia Brown-Turner to Rookie Contracts
April 18, 2024	Signed Aaliyah Edwards to a Rookie Contract
April 24, 2024	Exercised Team Option on Shakira Austin
May 7, 2024	Acquired Bernadett Határ from the Connecticut Sun and the Sun's second round 2025 draft pick in exchange for Queen Egbo
May 9, 2024	Waived Honesty Scott-Grayson
May 11, 2024	Acquired Jade Melbourne from Seattle Storm in exchange for third round 2025 draft pick
May 12, 2024	Waived Jakia Brown-Turner, Elissa Cunane, and Kaylynne Truong
June 28, 2024	Signed Jakia Brown-Turner to a hardship contract
July 2, 2024	Released Jakia Brown-Turner from hardship contract
July 4, 2024	Signed Jakia Brown-Turner to a 7-day hardship contract
July 12, 2024	Signed Jakia Brown-Turner to a second 7-day contract
August 13, 2024	Released Jakia Brown-Turner from second 7-day contract
August 20, 2024	Acquired Olivia Époupa, Sika Koné, and a 2026 second round pick from the Minnesota Lynx in exchange for Myisha Hines-Allen
August 20, 2024	Waived Olivia Époupa and DiDi Richards
August 20, 2024	Acquired Sug Sutton and 2025 3rd Round Pick from the Phoenix Mercury in exchange for the rights to Klara Lundquist

=== Roster changes ===
==== Additions ====
Personnel	Signed/Trade	Former team
Stefanie Dolson	Signed	New York Liberty
Aaliyah Edwards	Draft	Connecticut Huskies
Emily Engstler	Signed	Minnesota Lynx
Bernadett Határ	Trade	Connecticut Sun
Sika Koné	Trade	Minnesota Lynx
Jade Melbourne	Trade	Seattle Storm
DiDi Richards	Signed	—
Karlie Samuelson	Signed	Los Angeles Sparks
Sug Sutton	Trade	Phoenix Mercury
Julie Vanloo	Signed	—

==== Subtractions ====
Personnel	Reason	New team
Natasha Cloud	Free Agency	Phoenix Mercury
Elena Delle Donne	Contract Suspended	—
Queen Egbo	Trade	Connecticut Sun
Tianna Hawkins	Free Agency	—
Myisha Hines-Allen	Trade	Minnesota Lynx
Li Meng	Free Agency	—
Kristi Toliver	Retirement	

== Roster ==
2024 Washington Mystics roster
Players
Coaches

Pos.	No.	Nat.	Name	Height	Weight	DOB	From	Yrs
G	7	(United States)	Atkins, Ariel	5' 8" (1.73m)	167 lb (76kg)	1996-07-30	Texas	6
F/C	0	(United States)	Austin, Shakira (injured)	6' 5" (1.96m)	190 lb (86kg)	2000-07-25	Mississippi	2
C	31	(United States)	Dolson, Stefanie	6' 5" (1.96m)	235 lb (107kg)	1992-01-08	Connecticut	10
F	24	(Canada)	Edwards, Aaliyah (injured)	6' 3" (1.91m)		2002-07-09	Connecticut	R
F	21	(United States)	Engstler, Emily	6' 1" (1.85m)	180 lb (82kg)	2000-05-01	Louisville	2
F	3	(Mali)	Koné, Sika	6' 4" (1.93m)	180 lb (82kg)	2002-07-13	Mali	1
G	5	(Australia)	Melbourne, Jade	5' 11" (1.8m)	145 lb (66kg)	2002-08-18	Australia	1
G	44	(United States)	Samuelson, Karlie	6' 0" (1.83m)	160 lb (73kg)	1995-05-10	Stanford	5
G	1	(United States)	Sutton, Sug	5' 8" (1.73m)	140 lb (64kg)	1998-12-17	Texas	2
G	20	(United States)	Sykes, Brittney	5' 9" (1.75m)	154 lb (70kg)	1994-02-07	Syracuse	7
G	35	(Belgium)	Vanloo, Julie	5' 8" (1.73m)		1993-02-10	Belgium	R
G	32	(United States)	Walker-Kimbrough, Shatori	5' 9" (1.75m)	140 lb (64kg)	1995-05-18	Maryland	7
G	–	(Spain)	Alarcón, Txell (DP)	5' 10" (1.78m)		2003-07-31	Spain	–
F	–	(Belgium)	Claessens, Nastja (DP)	6' 1" (1.85m)		2004-12-02	Belgium	–

Head coach
(United States) Eric Thibault (Missouri)
Assistant coaches
(United States) LaToya Sanders (North Carolina)
(United States) Shelley Patterson (Washington State)
(United States) Ashlee McGee (Austin Peay)
Athletic trainer
(United States) Chrisitna Kennedy

Legend

- (C) Team captain
- (DP) Unsigned draft pick
- (FA) Free agent
- (S) Suspended
- Injured

=== Depth ===
Pos.	Starter	Bench
PG	Brittney Sykes	Julie Vanloo; Jade Melbourne
SG	Ariel Atkins	Sug Sutton
SF	Karlie Samuelson	Shatori Walker-Kimbrough
PF	Shakira Austin	Aaliyah Edwards; Emily Engstler
C	Stefanie Dolson	Sika Koné

== Schedule ==
=== Pre-season ===
2024 pre-season game log
Total: 0–2 (Home: 0–1; Road: 0–1)
May: 0–2 (Home: 0–1; Road: 0–1)

Game	Date	Team	Score	High points	High rebounds	High assists	Location Attendance	Record
1	May 4	@ Atlanta	L 84–87	Myisha Hines-Allen (13)	Edwards, Egbo, Hines-Allen (4)	Julie Vanloo (8)	Gateway Center Arena	0–1
2	May 8	Minnesota	L 77–83	Ariel Atkins (20)	Myisha Hines-Allen (6)	Julie Vanloo (6)	Entertainment and Sports Arena; 4,112	0–2

2024 pre-season schedule

=== Regular season ===
2024 game log
Total: 14–26 (Home: 5–15; Road: 9–11)
May: 0–8 (Home: 0–3; Road: 0–5)

Game	Date	Team	Score	High points	High rebounds	High assists	Location Attendance	Record
1	May 14	New York	L 80–85	Ariel Atkins (20)	Brittney Sykes (10)	Brittney Sykes (7)	Entertainment and Sports Arena; 4,200	0–1
2	May 17	@ Connecticut	L 77–84	Karlie Samuelson (18)	Shakira Austin (9)	Julie Vanloo (8)	Mohegan Sun Arena; 6,874	0–2
3	May 19	Seattle	L 75–84	Ariel Atkins (19)	Aaliyah Edwards (11)	Julie Vanloo (5)	Entertainment and Sports Arena; 4,200	0–3
4	May 21	@ Los Angeles	L 68–70	Austin, Vanloo (12)	Shakira Austin (8)	Julie Vanloo (9)	Walter Pyramid; 3,627	0–4
5	May 23	@ Phoenix	L 80–83	Ariel Atkins (16)	Julie Vanloo (7)	Myisha Hines-Allen (5)	Footprint Center; 7,474	0–5
6	May 25	@ Seattle	L 69–101	Karlie Samuelson (16)	Atkins, Edwards, Hines-Allen (5)	Hines-Allen, Vanloo (3)	Climate Pledge Arena; 8,846	0–6
7	May 29	Atlanta	L 67–73	Ariel Atkins (21)	Shakira Austin (9)	Julie Vanloo (5)	Entertainment and Sports Arena; 4,200	0–7
8	May 31	@ New York	L 79–90	Ariel Atkins (15)	Atkins, Hines-Allen (7)	Julie Vanloo (7)	Barclays Center; 9,878	0–8

June : 4–7 (Home: 3–4; Road: 1–3)

Game	Date	Team	Score	High points	High rebounds	High assists	Location Attendance	Record
9	June 4	@ Connecticut	L 59–76	Aaliyah Edwards (14)	Aaliyah Edwards (9)	Julie Vanloo (5)	Mohegan Sun Arena; 5,346	0–9
10	June 6	Chicago	L 71–79	Aaliyah Edwards (23)	Aaliyah Edwards (14)	Julie Vanloo (7)	Capital One Arena; 10,000	0–10
11	June 7	Indiana	L 83–85	Stefanie Dolson (19)	Aaliyah Edwards (12)	Julie Vanloo (6)	Capital One Arena; 20,333	0–11
12	June 9	@ New York	L 88–93	Jade Melbourne (21)	Myisha Hines-Allen (8)	Myisha Hines-Allen (7)	Barclays Center; 12,477	0–12
13	June 11	@ Atlanta	W 87–68	Atkins, Sykes (18)	Edwards, Hines-Allen, Samuelson (6)	Ariel Atkins (5)	Gateway Center Arena; 3,260	1–12
14	June 14	Chicago	W 83–81	Ariel Atkins (29)	Aaliyah Edwards (9)	Stefanie Dolson (5)	Entertainment and Sports Arena; 4,200	2–12
15	June 19	@ Indiana	L 81–88	Ariel Atkins (27)	Stefanie Dolson (7)	Julie Vanloo (8)	Gainbridge Fieldhouse; 17,274	2–13
16	June 22	Dallas	W 97–69	Emily Engstler (23)	Stefanie Dolson (10)	Julie Vanloo (6)	Entertainment and Sports Arena; 4,200	3–13
17	June 23	Dallas	W 92–84	Stefanie Dolson (18)	Stefanie Dolson (8)	Ariel Atkins (7)	Entertainment and Sports Arena; 4,200	4–13
18	June 27	Connecticut	L 91–94 (OT)	Myisha Hines-Allen (21)	Myisha Hines-Allen (7)	Shatori Walker-Kimbrough (6)	Entertainment and Sports Arena; 4,200	4–14
19	June 29	Las Vegas	L 77–88	Stefanie Dolson (23)	Dolson, Edwards (7)	Julie Vanloo (8)	Entertainment and Sports Arena; 4,200	4–15

July : 2–4 (Home: 0–2; Road: 2–2)

Game	Date	Team	Score	High points	High rebounds	High assists	Location Attendance	Record
20	July 2	@ Los Angeles	W 82–80	Shatori Walker-Kimbrough (17)	Stefanie Dolson (8)	Ariel Atkins (5)	Crypto.com Arena; 9,164	5–15
21	July 4	@ Las Vegas	L 77–98	Shatori Walker-Kimbrough (19)	Emily Engstler (8)	Jade Melbourne (6)	Michelob Ultra Arena; 10,376	5–16
22	July 6	@ Minnesota	L 67–74	Atkins, Walker-Kimbrough (15)	Myisha Hines-Allen (11)	Myisha Hines-Allen (6)	Target Center; 7,610	5–17
23	July 10	@ Indiana	W 89–84	Ariel Atkins (26)	Myisha Hines-Allen (9)	Stefanie Dolson (6)	Gainbridge Fieldhouse; 17,274	6–17
24	July 14	Las Vegas	L 77–89	Ariel Atkins (36)	Stefanie Dolson (6)	Julie Vanloo (7)	Entertainment and Sports Arena; 4,200	6–18
25	July 16	Phoenix	L 87–96	Myisha Hines-Allen (18)	Myisha Hines-Allen (12)	Ariel Atkins (6)	Capital One Arena; 12,586	6–19

August : 3–4 (Home: 1–3; Road: 2–1)

Game	Date	Team	Score	High points	High rebounds	High assists	Location Attendance	Record
26	August 15	@ Minnesota	L 68–79	Ariel Atkins (12)	Shakira Austin (10)	Stefanie Dolson (4)	Target Center; 7,224	6–20
27	August 17	Minnesota	L 83–99	Stefanie Dolson (23)	Aaliyah Edwards (7)	Brittney Sykes (7)	Entertainment and Sports Arena; 4,200	6–21
28	August 20	Seattle	L 77–83	Ariel Atkins (25)	Shakira Austin (9)	Julie Vanloo (6)	Entertainment and Sports Arena; 4,200	6–22
29	August 23	Los Angeles	W 80–74	Brittney Sykes (28)	Shakira Austin (11)	Stefanie Dolson (8)	Entertainment and Sports Arena; 4,200	7–22
30	August 26	@ Seattle	W 74–72	Brittney Sykes (20)	Stefanie Dolson (10)	Julie Vanloo (4)	Climate Pledge Arena; 9,535	8–22
31	August 28	@ Chicago	W 74–70	Stefanie Dolson (17)	Atkins, Dolson (6)	Ariel Atkins (5)	Wintrust Arena; 8,763	9–22
32	August 31	Connecticut	L 85–96	Ariel Atkins (15)	Stefanie Dolson (7)	Karlie Samuelson (5)	Entertainment and Sports Arena; 4,200	9–23

September : 5–3 (Home: 1–3; Road: 4–0)

Game	Date	Team	Score	High points	High rebounds	High assists	Location Attendance	Record
33	September 3	@ Dallas	W 90–86	Emily Engstler (19)	Emily Engstler (10)	3 players (4)	College Park Center; 5,129	10–23
34	September 5	@ Phoenix	W 90–77	Karlie Samuelson (19)	Aaliyah Edwards (6)	Julie Vanloo (4)	Footprint Center; 7,709	11–23
35	September 8	Minnesota	L 71–78	Brittney Sykes (13)	Stefanie Dolson (7)	Atkins, Vanloo (4)	Entertainment and Sports Arena; 4,200	11–24
36	September 11	@ Chicago	W 89–58	Aaliyah Edwards (15)	Aaliyah Edwards (10)	Brittney Sykes (7)	Wintrust Arena; 7,948	12–24
37	September 13	@ Atlanta	W 72–69	Brittney Sykes (20)	Dolson, Koné (8)	Emily Engstler (4)	Gateway Center Arena; 3,260	13–24
38	September 15	Atlanta	L 73–76 (OT)	Ariel Atkins (16)	Stefanie Dolson (6)	Samuelson, Sykes (3)	Entertainment and Sports Arena; 4,200	13–25
39	September 17	New York	L 71–87	Ariel Atkins (22)	Emily Engstler (8)	Karlie Samuelson (4)	Entertainment and Sports Arena; 4,200	13–26
40	September 19	Indiana	W 92–91	Sika Koné (20)	Sika Koné (7)	Emily Engstler (4)	Capital One Arena; 20,711	14–26

2024 season schedule

== Standings ==
#	Team	W	L	PCT	GB	Conf.	Home	Road	Cup
1	yx – New York Liberty	32	8	.800	—	16–4	16–4	16–4	5–0
2	cx – Minnesota Lynx	30	10	.750	2	14–6	16–4	14–6	4–1
3	x – Connecticut Sun	28	12	.700	4	14–6	14–6	14–6	4–1
4	x – Las Vegas Aces	27	13	.675	5	12–8	13–7	14–6	2–3
5	x – Seattle Storm	25	15	.625	7	13–7	14–6	11–9	4–1
6	x – Indiana Fever	20	20	.500	12	11–9	12–8	8–12	3–2
7	x – Phoenix Mercury	19	21	.475	13	10–10	10–10	9–11	3–2
8	x – Atlanta Dream	15	25	.375	17	7–13	8–12	7–13	1–4
9	e – Washington Mystics	14	26	.350	18	7–13	5–15	9–11	1–4
10	e – Chicago Sky	13	27	.325	19	5–15	6–14	7–13	1–4
11	e – Dallas Wings	9	31	.225	23	6–14	7–13	2–18	0–5
12	e – Los Angeles Sparks	8	32	.200	24	5–15	5–15	3–17	2–3

Notes

(#) – League Standing
c – Commissioner's Cup winners
y – Regular Season Champion
x – Clinched playoff berth
e – Eliminated from playoff contention
Source: Overall standings and Commissioner's Cup Standings

== Statistics ==
Legend
GP	Games played	GS	Games started	MPG	Minutes per game	RPG	Rebounds per game
APG	Assists per game	SPG	Steals per game	BPG	Blocks per game	PPG	Points per game
FG%	Field-goal percentage	3P%	3-point field-goal percentage	FT%	Free-throw percentage	TO	Turnovers per game
PF	Fouls per game		Team leader		League leader

=== Regular season ===
Player	GP	GS	MPG	FG%	3P%	FT%	RPG	APG	SPG	BPG	TO	PF	PPG
Ariel Atkins	40	40	29.9	.437	.357	.848	3.4	3.1	1.5	0.4	2.3	2.8	14.9
Brittney Sykes	18	18	23.4	.405	.271	.750	4.1	3.1	0.9	0.4	2.2	1.4	12.2
Shakira Austin	12	11	19.9	.430	.250	.667	6.8	0.9	1.3	0.9	2.4	2.5	11.8
Stefanie Dolson	39	39	25.9	.475	.465	.786	4.9	2.6	0.5	0.5	1.7	2.9	9.5
Sika Koné^{≠}	10	0	16.0	.433	.571	.889	4.3	1.1	0.4	0.2	0.9	2.0	8.6
Karlie Samuelson	29	19	24.5	.409	.398	.923	2.6	2.1	0.9	0.0	0.9	1.7	8.4
Myisha Hines-Allen^{†}	27	10	19.1	.489	.359	.829	4.9	2.7	0.6	0.1	1.4	1.9	8.0
Aaliyah Edwards	34	17	21.8	.490	.000	.507	5.6	1.4	0.7	0.8	1.5	2.7	7.6
Shatori Walker-Kimbrough	40	2	22.1	.415	.330	.806	1.7	1.9	1.1	0.5	1.4	1.0	7.5
Julie Vanloo	40	34	23.2	.346	.324	.667	1.6	4.3	0.5	0.0	2.6	2.2	7.4
Emily Engstler	32	3	14.5	.490	.474	.818	4.0	1.5	0.6	0.8	0.7	1.5	6.2
Jade Melbourne	37	0	14.1	.434	.357	.714	1.5	1.6	0.6	0.1	1.7	1.5	5.4
DiDi Richards^{‡}	19	7	10.4	.408	.000	.429	1.5	0.7	0.1	0.2	0.4	0.8	2.4
Jakia Brown-Turner^{≠} ^{‡}	2	0	4.0	.000	—	1.000	0.5	0.0	0.5	0.0	0.0	0.0	1.0
Sug Sutton^{≠}	7	0	7.3	.286	.000	—	0.6	1.4	0.3	0.0	0.7	0.1	0.6

^{‡}Waived/Released during the season
^{†}Traded during the season
^{≠}Acquired during the season

== Awards and honors ==
Recipient	Award	Date awarded	Ref.
