= Queen Egbo =

American basketball player (born 2000)

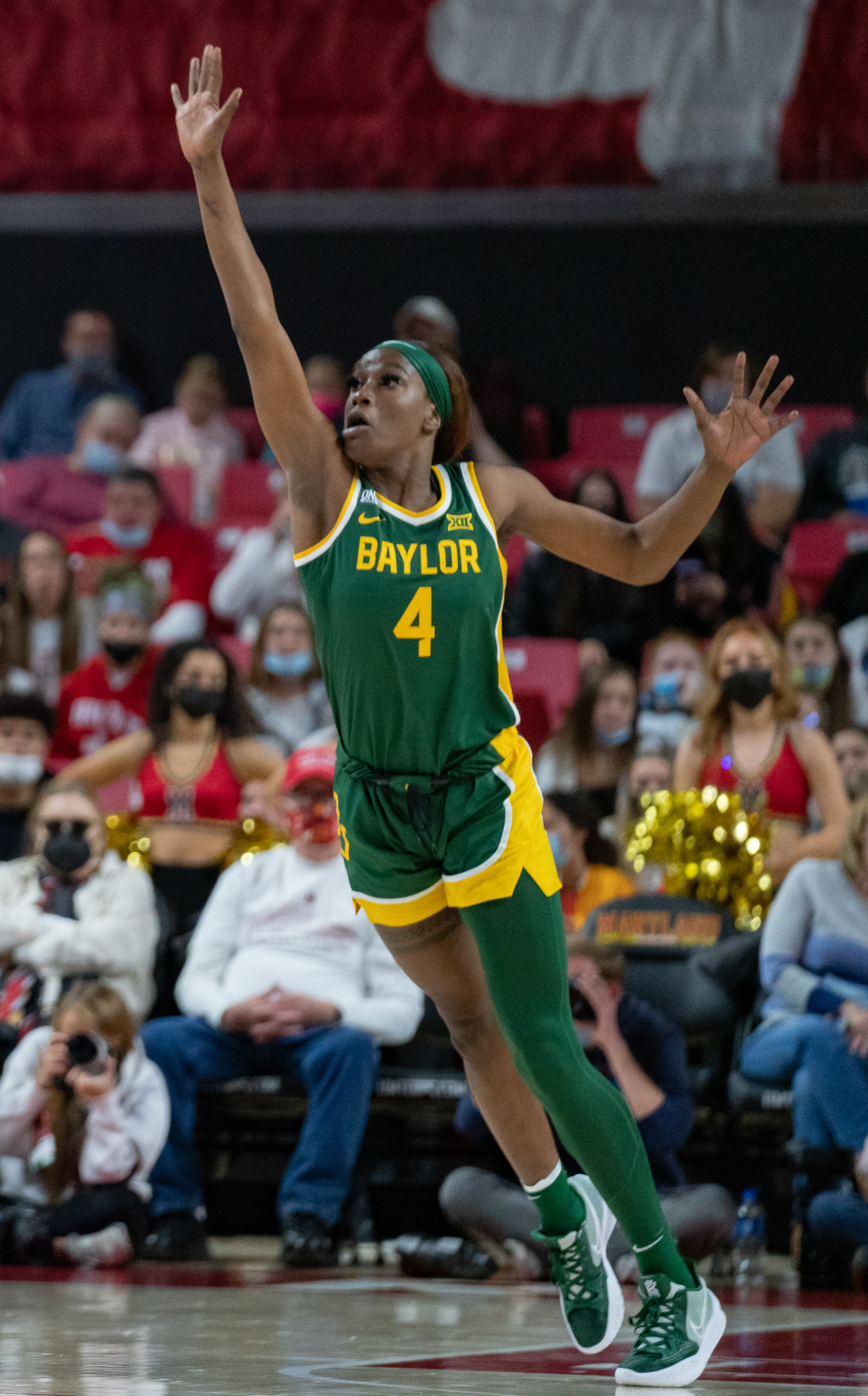
- Egbo with Baylor in 2021

Shanxi Flame
- Position: Center

Personal information
- Born: June 29, 2000 (age 26) Houston, Texas, U.S.
- Listed height: 6 ft 4 in (1.93 m)
- Listed weight: 200 lb (91 kg)

Career information
- High school: Travis (Richmond, Texas)
- College: Baylor (2018–2022)
- WNBA draft: 2022: 1st round, 10th overall pick
- Drafted by: Indiana Fever

Career history
- 2022–2023: Indiana Fever
- 2023: Washington Mystics
- 2024: Fujian Zoten
- 2024: Connecticut Sun
- 2024: Los Angeles Sparks
- 2024: Las Vegas Aces
- 2024–2025: Shaanxi Red Wolves
- 2025-present: Shanxi Flame

Career highlights
- WNBA All-Rookie Team (2022); NCAA champion (2019); Big 12 Sixth Player of the Year (2020); McDonald's All-American (2018)
- Stats at Basketball Reference
Medals
Women's basketball
Representing the United States
FIBA Under-19 World Cup
| Gold medal – first place | 2019 Thailand | Team |

Queen Kamsiyochukwu Egbo (born June 29, 2000) is an American professional basketball player who is currently a free agent. She previously played in the WNBA for the Indiana Fever, Washington Mystics, Connecticut Sun, Los Angeles Sparks and Las Vegas Aces. She played college basketball at Baylor. She was selected 10th overall in the 2022 WNBA draft by the Fever. She represented the United States at the 2019 FIBA Under-19 Women's Basketball World Cup and won a gold medal.

== Early life ==
Egbo attended Travis High School in Richmond, Texas. During her freshman year in 2015, she averaged 14.2 points, and 13 rebounds per game and 150 total blocks. She also had two triple-doubles and 19 double-doubles during her first varsity season. During her sophomore year in 2016, she averaged 14.8 points, 11.3 rebounds, 2.3 steals and 4.6 blocks per game.

During her junior year in 2017, she averaged 18.8 points, 13.1 rebounds, 4.1 blocks, and 2.1 steals per game. She also had 21 double-doubles in 33 regular season games for the Lady Tigers'. Following an outstanding season she was named district MVP. During her senior year, she averaged 17.3 points, 12.4 rebounds, 5.0 blocks and 3.9 steals per game. She was named a McDonald's All-American in 2018.

== College career ==
During the 2018–19 season, in her freshman year, she averaged 5.4 points, 4.2 rebounds and 0.9 blocks in 35 games for Baylor. During the 2019–20 season, in her sophomore year, she averaged 10.8 points, 6.8 rebounds, 1.1 blocks and 0.9 steals per game in 30 games. Following the season, she was named the Big 12 Sixth Player of the Year.

During the 2020–21 season, in her junior year, she ranked tenth in the Big 12 in rebounds per game (7.2), fourth in offensive rebounds (3.1), and seventh in blocks per contest (1.2). She averaged 10.9 points in just 19.9 minutes per game and led the team in field goal percentage at a .504. She was named a top-five finalist for the Lisa Leslie Award. During the 2021–22 season, in her senior year, she averaged 11.0 points and 8.4 rebounds per game, and was named a top-ten finalist for the Lisa Leslie Award.

On March 27, 2022, Egbo renounced her extra year of eligibility due to the COVID-19 pandemic and declared for the 2022 WNBA draft.

== Professional career ==
On April 11, 2022, Egbo was drafted in the first round, 10th overall, by the Indiana Fever in the 2022 WNBA draft.

On July 4, 2023, Egbo was traded to the Washington Mystics in exchange for Amanda Zahui B.

On May 7, 2024, Egbo was traded to the Connecticut Sun in exchange for a second-round pick in the 2025 WNBA draft, and the rights to Bernadett Határ. On June 5, 2024, Egbo was waived by the Sun. She appeared in three games for Connecticut during the 2024 WNBA season, logging two points and two rebounds in seven minutes of action.

On June 22, 2024, Egbo signed a hardship contract with the Los Angeles Sparks. On June 29, 2024, her birthday, she was waived by the Sparks.

On September 2, 2024, Egbo signed a seven-day contract with the Las Vegas Aces.

Egbo signed a training camp contract with the Aces on February 6, 2025. On May 7, she was waived by the Aces.

== National team career ==
Egbo was named to the 2018 United States women's national under-18 basketball team, however, she withdrew due to school commitments. Egbo represented the United States at the 2019 FIBA Under-19 Women's Basketball World Cup, where she averaged 7.9 points and 5.4 rebounds per game, and won a gold medal.

== Career statistics ==
Legend
| GP | Games played | GS | Games started | MPG | Minutes per game | RPG | Rebounds per game |
| APG | Assists per game | SPG | Steals per game | BPG | Blocks per game | PPG | Points per game |
| TO | Turnovers per game | FG% | Field-goal percentage | 3P% | 3-point field-goal percentage | FT% | Free-throw percentage |
| **Bold** | Career best | ° | League leader |

| * | Denotes season(s) in which Egbo won an NCAA Championship |

=== WNBA ===
==== Regular season ====
Stats current through end of 2024 season

WNBA regular season statistics
| Year | Team | GP | GS | MPG | FG% | 3P% | FT% | RPG | APG | SPG | BPG | TO | PPG |
|---|---|---|---|---|---|---|---|---|---|---|---|---|---|
| 2022 | Indiana | **33** | **31** | **21.8** | .442 | — | .645 | **6.3** | **0.9** | **0.9** | **1.2** | 1.9 | **7.2** |
| 2023 | Indiana | 16 | 0 | 8.9 | .400 | — | .647 | 4.0 | 0.1 | 0.1 | 0.5 | 0.7 | 2.9 |
| 2023 | Washington | 21 | 0 | 15.8 | .544 | — | .633 | 4.4 | 0.4 | 0.6 | 0.7 | 1.1 | 6.2 |
| 2024 | Connecticut | 3 | 0 | 2.3 | .000 | — | **1.000** | 0.7 | 0.0 | 0.0 | 0.0 | **0.0** | 0.7 |
| 2024 | Los Angeles | 2 | 0 | 2.0 | **1.000** | — | .000 | 1.5 | 0.0 | 0.0 | 0.0 | **0.0** | 1.0 |
| 2024 | Las Vegas | 3 | 0 | 6.0 | .667 | — | — | 1.7 | 0.0 | 0.7 | 0.3 | **0.0** | 2.7 |
| **Career** | 3 years, 5 teams | 78 | 31 | 15.7 | .464 | — | .648 | 4.8 | 0.5 | 0.6 | 0.8 | 1.3 | 5.5 |

==== Playoffs ====
WNBA playoff statistics
| Year | Team | GP | GS | MPG | FG% | 3P% | FT% | RPG | APG | SPG | BPG | TO | PPG |
|---|---|---|---|---|---|---|---|---|---|---|---|---|---|
| 2023 | Washington | **2** | 0 | **4.5** | .000 | — | — | 0.5 | 0.0 | 0.0 | 0.0 | 0.0 | 0.0 |
| 2024 | Las Vegas | 1 | 0 | 3.0 | — | — | — | **1.0** | **1.0** | 0.0 | 0.0 | 0.0 | 0.0 |
| **Career** | 2 years, 2 teams | 3 | 0 | 4.0 | .000 | — | — | 0.7 | 0.3 | 0.0 | 0.0 | 0.0 | 0.0 |

=== College ===
NCAA statistics
| Year | Team | GP | GS | MPG | FG% | 3P% | FT% | RPG | APG | SPG | BPG | TO | PPG |
|---|---|---|---|---|---|---|---|---|---|---|---|---|---|
| 2018–19* | Baylor | **35** | 0 | 10.1 | .453 | .000 | .506 | 4.2 | 0.3 | 0.6 | 0.9 | **1.0** | 5.1 |
| 2019–20 | Baylor | 30 | 8 | 18.5 | **.604** | .000 | .488 | 6.8 | 0.4 | 0.9 | 1.1 | 1.7 | 10.8 |
| 2020–21 | Baylor | 30 | 30 | **24.9** | .500 | .000 | .639 | **8.6** | **0.9** | **1.2** | **1.9** | 2.5 | **11.1** |
| 2021–22 | Baylor | **35** | **35** | 23.9 | .498 | .000 | **.702** | 8.4 | **0.9** | 0.9 | 1.8 | 1.9 | 11.0 |
| **Career** | | 130 | 73 | 19.1 | .517 | .000 | .594 | 7.0 | 0.6 | 0.9 | 1.4 | 1.8 | 9.5 |
