= Eric Thibault =

American basketball coach (born 1987)

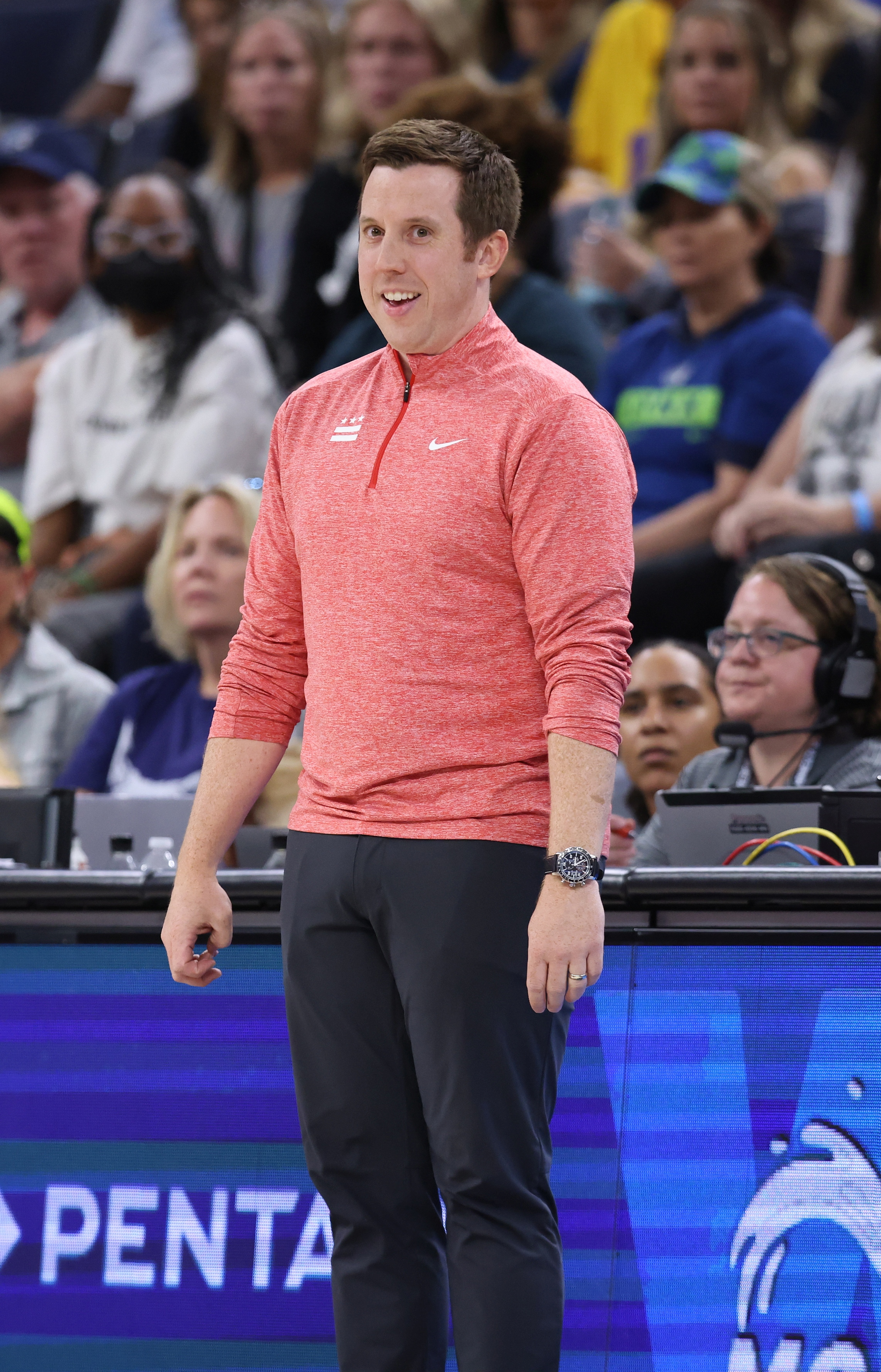
- Thibault with the Washington Mystics in 2024

Minnesota Lynx
- Position: Associate head coach
- League: WNBA

Personal information
- Born: August 22, 1987 (age 39) Chicago, Illinois, U.S.

Career information
- College: University of Missouri
- Coaching career: 2010–present

Career history
- 2010–2012: St. John's (graduate assistant)
- 2012–2013: VCU Rams (assistant)
- 2013–2018: Washington Mystics (assistant)
- 2019–2022: Washington Mystics (associate HC)
- 2023–2024: Washington Mystics
- 2025–present: Minnesota Lynx (associate HC)

Eric Dean Thibault (born August 22, 1987) is an American professional basketball coach who is the associate head coach for the Minnesota Lynx of the Women's National Basketball Association (WNBA). Thibault previously spent 12 seasons as an assistant coach, associate head coach, and head coach for the Washington Mystics.

== College ==
Thibault attended the University of Missouri for his undergraduate English degree and was a member of the all-male practice squad for the Missouri Tiger women's basketball team during his time. After spending three seasons as a practice player, Thibault moved into a graduate assistant role with the Tigers.

Following one year as a graduate assistant at Missouri, the coaching staff there was let go and Thibault found another graduate assistant opportunity with Kim Barnes Arico and the St. John's Red Storm women's basketball team.

== Coaching career ==
=== VCU Rams (2012–2013) ===
Following his years as a graduate assistant, Thibault got his first assistant coaching job with the VCU Rams women's basketball team. Thibault only spent one year there before he left to go the WNBA coaching ranks.

=== Washington Mystics (2013–2024) ===
==== Assistant coach and associate head coach ====
Thibault was named an assistant coach on the Washington Mystics staff in May of 2013. Prior to the 2019 season, the Mystics promoted him to Associate head coach, a position that he held until the end of the 2022 season.. During his tenure, the Mystics won the 2019 WNBA championship.

==== Head coach ====
Thibault was promoted to the Mystics head coach position in November of 2022, following the coaching retirement of his father and previous Mystics head coach Mike Thibault. On October 23, 2024, the Mystics announced that they had mutually agreed to part ways with both Eric and Mike Thibault.

=== Minnesota Lynx (2025–present) ===
On November 30, 2024, Thibault was announced as the associate head coach of the Minnesota Lynx.

== Head coaching record ==
Legend
| Regular season | G | Games coached | W | Games won | L | Games lost | W–L % | Win–loss % |
| Playoffs | PG | Playoff games | PW | Playoff wins | PL | Playoff losses | PW–L % | Playoff win–loss % |

| Team | Year | G | W | L | W–L% | Finish | PG | PW | PL | PW–L% | Result |
|---|---|---|---|---|---|---|---|---|---|---|---|
| WAS | 2023 | 40 | 19 | 21 | .475 | 4th in Eastern | 2 | 0 | 2 | .000 | Lost in 1st Round |
| WAS | 2024 | 40 | 14 | 26 | .350 | 5th in Eastern | — | — | — | – | Missed Playoffs |
| Career | | 80 | 33 | 47 | .413 | | 2 | 0 | 2 | .000 | |

== Personal life ==
Thibault's father is Mike Thibault, who had coached in both the NBA and the WNBA between 1980 and 2022. Mike is currently the head coach for the Belgium women's national basketball team. Eric's sister is Carly Thibault-DuDonis, who is currently the head coach for the Fairfield Stags women's basketball team.

Eric is married to his wife, Andreya, with whom he shares a son, Dean, born May 2023.
