= Taiyanna Jackson =

American basketball player (born 2000)

No. 5 – Hefei
- Position: Center
- League: WCBA

Personal information
- Born: November 24, 2000 (age 25) Munster, Indiana, U.S.
- Listed height: 6 ft 6 in (1.98 m)

Career information
- High school: Central High School (East Chicago, Indiana); Montverde Academy (Montverde, Florida)
- College: Trinity Valley CC (2019–2021); Kansas (2021–2024)
- WNBA draft: 2024: 2nd round, 19th overall pick
- Drafted by: Connecticut Sun
- Playing career: 2024–present

Career history
- 2024–present: Hefei

Career highlights
- 3x Big 12 All-Defensive Team (2022–2024); 2× First-team All-Big 12 (2023, 2024)
- Stats at Basketball Reference

Taiyanna Rajeen Jackson (born November 24, 2000) is an American professional basketball player for Hefei of the Women's Chinese Basketball Association (WCBA). She played college basketball for the Trinity Valley Cardinals and Kansas Jayhawks and was selected by the Connecticut Sun in the second round of the 2024 WNBA draft.

== Early life ==
Jackson was born on November 24, 2000, in Munster, Indiana. She attended Central High School in East Chicago, Indiana, briefly transferred to Montverde Academy, and then transferred back to Central and graduated from there. At Central, she averaged 12.3 points, 10.7 rebounds, 4.0 blocks and 2.2 assists per game, which included 17.6 points, 7.7 rebounds, 3.2 blocks and 3.1 assists as a senior. She was named all-area and all-state three times and was ranked as a four-star recruit, being the third-best player in Indiana per ESPN. She initially committed to play college basketball for the Ole Miss Rebels, but later decided to go the junior college route by committing to Trinity Valley Community College.

== College career ==
Jackson played two seasons at Trinity Valley, averaging 10.3 points per game and helped the team win a Region XIV title while receiving National Junior College Athletic Association (NJCAA) Region 14 Freshman of the Year honors. She transferred to the Kansas Jayhawks in 2021 and placed fourth nationally with a school-record 5.7 blocks per game, being named to the Big 12 Conference All-Defensive team and honorable mention All-Big 12.

In her second season at Kansas, 2022–23, Jackson was named unanimous first-team All-Big 12 and Big 12 All-Defensive after leading the conference in rebounds, blocked shots, field goal percentage and double-doubles. She broke her own school record with 109 blocked shots and averaged 15.2 points and 12.7 rebounds per game. She was an honorable mention All-American and was the most valuable player of the Women's National Invitation Tournament after averaging 17.0 points and 13.0 rebounds there.

She returned for a final season in 2023–24 and broke the career blocks record at Kansas. She averaged 12.6 points and 10.0 rebounds and placed fourth in the nation for blocked shots, with 97. She also finished with a career total of 41 double-doubles, second most in school history. She was selected an honorable mention All-American, first-team Big 12 and a Big 12 All-Defensive selection. In her Kansas career, she started every one of her 99 games and recorded averages of 12.4 points, 10.4 rebounds and 3.0 blocks per game.

== Professional career ==
Jackson was drafted in the second round, 19th overall, by the Connecticut Sun in the 2024 WNBA draft. She was waived on May 10.
