= 2024 WNBA season =

- League: Women's National Basketball Association
- Sport: Basketball
- Duration: May 14 – October 20, 2024
- Games: 40 per team
- Teams: 12
- Total attendance: 2,353,735
- Average attendance: 9,807
- TV partner(s): ABC/ESPN/ESPN2; Ion; CBS/CBSSN; Amazon Prime Video; NBA TV

Draft
- Top draft pick: (United States) Caitlin Clark
- Picked by: Indiana Fever

Regular season
- Top seed: New York Liberty
- Season MVP: (United States) A'ja Wilson (Las Vegas)
- Top scorer: (United States) A'ja Wilson (Las Vegas)

Playoffs
- Finals champions: New York Liberty (1st title)
- Runners-up: Minnesota Lynx
- Finals MVP: (The Bahamas) / (Bosnia and Herzegovina) Jonquel Jones (New York)

WNBA seasons
- ← 2023 2025 →

The 2024 WNBA season was the 28th season of the Women's National Basketball Association (WNBA). The regular season began on May 14, 2024, and ended on September 19. The 2024 WNBA Commissioner's Cup was held from June 1 to 25. The 2024 WNBA All-Star Game was played on July 20, 2024, at Footprint Center in Phoenix, Arizona. The playoffs began on September 22; the WNBA Finals between the New York Liberty and the Minnesota Lynx began on October 10, with the Liberty winning the championship on October 20, for their first WNBA title.

The season saw a significant increase of attendance and television viewership across the league, with there being a 48% jump in attendance and compared to the 2023 season and a record 22 regular season games attracting over 1 million viewers.

== Draft ==
The 2024 WNBA draft was held on April 15, 2024. The Indiana Fever won the first pick in the weighted draft lottery, held between the four teams that did not qualify for the 2023 WNBA Playoffs. It is the second consecutive year that Indiana has won the first pick in the draft. The remaining lottery picks went to the Los Angeles Sparks in second, Phoenix Mercury in third, and Seattle Storm in fourth; the remaining picks are based on the regular season record of teams who qualified for the playoffs, from worst to best.

=== Lottery picks ===
Pick	Player	Nationality	Team	School / club team
1	Caitlin Clark	United States	Indiana Fever	Iowa
2	Cameron Brink	United States	Los Angeles Sparks	Stanford
3	Kamilla Cardoso	Brazil	Chicago Sky (from Phoenix)	South Carolina
4	Rickea Jackson	United States	Los Angeles Sparks (from Seattle)	Tennessee

== Transactions ==
=== Retirement ===
- On December 13, 2023, Tiffany Hayes announced her retirement after eleven seasons in the WNBA. Hayes made the All-Rookie team in 2012, she was an All-Star in 2017 and was selected to the All-WNBA First Team in 2018. She spent ten of her eleven seasons with the Atlanta Dream. Hayes later signed with the Las Vegas Aces on May 31, 2024.
- On January 17, 2024, Jasmine Thomas announced her retirement after thirteen seasons in the WNBA. Thomas was an All-Star in 2017 and made the All-Defensive team five times, three on the first team and twice on the second team. Thomas spent time with the Washington Mystics, Atlanta Dream, Connecticut Sun, and Los Angeles Sparks.
- On April 15, 2024, Tianna Hawkins announced her retirement. Her retirement ended a ten year career in which she spent time with the Seattle Storm, Atlanta Dream, and Washington Mystics. She was a part of the 2019 Mystics team that won the WNBA title.
- On April 23, 2024, Epiphanny Prince announced her retirement via Instagram. Prince played for four teams over fourteen years. She was an All-Star in 2011 and 2013, and was named All-WNBA Second Team in 2015. She won a WNBA title while playing with the Seattle Storm.
- On April 28, 2024, Candace Parker announced her retirement. Parker's career spanned sixteen years and three teams. She spent thirteen of those years with the Los Angeles Sparks, who drafted her first overall in 2008. She was a two-time MVP, seven-time All-Star, ten-time All-WNBA selection, and Rookie of the Year. She was the WNBA's rebounding leader three times and assist leader once. She won three WNBA Championships, one with each of the three teams she played with, Los Angeles, Chicago, and Las Vegas.

=== Free agency ===
The free agency negotiation period began on January 21, 2024, and teams were able to officially sign players starting February 1.

=== Coaching changes ===
Off-season
Team	2023 season	2024 season	Reference
Chicago Sky	(Turkey) Emre Vatansever	(United States) Teresa Weatherspoon	
Phoenix Mercury	(United States) Nikki Blue	(United States) Nate Tibbetts	

== Regular season ==
=== All-Star Game ===
ABC, TSN5/SN1

July 20, 2024
8:30 p.m. ET

Report

Team USA 109, Team WNBA 117
Scoring by quarter: 23–24, 31–28, 25–36, 30–29
Pts: Breanna Stewart 31; Rebs: Breanna Stewart 10; Asts: Kelsey Plum 6	Pts: Arike Ogunbowale 34; Rebs: Angel Reese 11; Asts: Caitlin Clark 10

Footprint Center, Phoenix, Arizona

=== Standings ===
#	Team	W	L	PCT	GB	Conf.	Home	Road	Cup
1	yx – New York Liberty	32	8	.800	—	16–4	16–4	16–4	5–0
2	cx – Minnesota Lynx	30	10	.750	2	14–6	16–4	14–6	4–1
3	x – Connecticut Sun	28	12	.700	4	14–6	14–6	14–6	4–1
4	x – Las Vegas Aces	27	13	.675	5	12–8	13–7	14–6	2–3
5	x – Seattle Storm	25	15	.625	7	13–7	14–6	11–9	4–1
6	x – Indiana Fever	20	20	.500	12	11–9	12–8	8–12	3–2
7	x – Phoenix Mercury	19	21	.475	13	10–10	10–10	9–11	3–2
8	x – Atlanta Dream	15	25	.375	17	7–13	8–12	7–13	1–4
9	e – Washington Mystics	14	26	.350	18	7–13	5–15	9–11	1–4
10	e – Chicago Sky	13	27	.325	19	5–15	6–14	7–13	1–4
11	e – Dallas Wings	9	31	.225	23	6–14	7–13	2–18	0–5
12	e – Los Angeles Sparks	8	32	.200	24	5–15	5–15	3–17	2–3

Notes

(#) – League Standing
c – Commissioner's Cup winners
y – Regular Season Champion
x – Clinched playoff berth
e – Eliminated from playoff contention
Source: Overall standings and Commissioner's Cup Standings

=== Schedule ===
2024 WNBA preseason
Preseason

Date	Time (ET)	Matchup			TV	Result	High points	High rebounds	High assists	Location
Monday, April 15	7:30 p.m.	2024 WNBA draft			USA: ESPN; Canada: TSN1/4 (TSN3 JIP at 9:00 p.m.)					New York
Friday, May 3	8:00 p.m.	Indiana	@	Dallas	Bally Sports App (DAL); League Pass	76–79	Tied (21)	McCowan (10)	Wheeler (4)	College Park Center; 6,251
Friday, May 3	8:00 p.m.	Chicago	@	Minnesota		81–92	3 tied (17)	Reese (9)	Hiedeman (6)	Target Center; 7,010
Saturday, May 4	1:00 p.m.	Washington	@	Atlanta		84–87	Hines-Allen (13)	Tied (5)	Vanloo (8)	Gateway Center Arena
Saturday, May 4	9:30 p.m.	Los Angeles	@	Seattle	USA: League Pass; Canada: TSN3	84–79	Hamby (17)	Hamby (9)	Tied (5)	Rogers Place; 16,655
Tuesday, May 7	8:00 p.m.	New York	@	Chicago		53–101	Mabrey (20)	Turner (8)	Evans (7)	Wintrust Arena; 3,132
Tuesday, May 7	10:00 p.m.	Phoenix	@	Seattle		59–85	Loyd (18)	Horston (9)	Diggins-Smith (5)	Climate Pledge Arena
Wednesday, May 8	11:30 a.m.	Minnesota	@	Washington		83–77	Atkins (20)	Collier (7)	Tied (6)	Entertainment and Sports Arena; 4,112
Thursday, May 9	7:00 p.m.	New York	@	Connecticut		82–79	Banham (20)	Stewart (7)	Thomas (7)	Mohegan Sun Arena; 5,617
Thursday, May 9	7:00 p.m.	Atlanta	@	Indiana	League Pass	80–83	N. Smith (21)	Clark (8)	Berger (7)	Gainbridge Fieldhouse; 13,028
Friday, May 10	10:00 p.m.	Los Angeles	@	Phoenix	League Pass	98–85	Tied (21)	Hamby (7)	Sutton (5)	Footprint Center; 4,598
Saturday, May 11	1:00 p.m.	Puerto Rico	@	Las Vegas		50–102	Wilson (27)	Wilson (14)	4 tied (3)	Colonial Life Arena

2024 WNBA regular season
May

Date	Time (ET)	Matchup			TV	Result	High points	High rebounds	High assists	Location
Tuesday, May 14	7:00 p.m.	New York	@	Washington	ESPN3; League Pass	85–80	J. Jones (25)	2 tied (8)	Ionescu (8)	Entertainment and Sports Arena; 4,200
Tuesday, May 14	7:30 p.m.	Indiana	@	Connecticut	USA: ESPN2, ESPN+, Disney+ Canada: TSN5	71–92	Bonner (20)	Thomas (10)	Thomas (13)	Mohegan Sun Arena; 8,910
Tuesday, May 14	10:00 p.m.	Phoenix	@	Las Vegas	USA: ESPN2, ESPN+, Disney+ Canada: NBA TV Canada	80–89	Wilson (30)	Wilson (13)	Young (6)	Michelob Ultra Arena; 10,419
Tuesday, May 14	10:00 p.m.	Minnesota	@	Seattle	ESPN3; League Pass	83–70	A. Smith (22)	Collier (12)	C. Williams (7)	Climate Pledge Arena; 8,508
Wednesday, May 15	8:00 p.m.	Chicago	@	Dallas	League Pass	79–87	Ogunbowale (25)	Tied (13)	Ogunbowale (7)	College Park Center; 6,251
Wednesday, May 15	10:00 p.m.	Atlanta	@	Los Angeles	USA: League Pass; Canada: NBA TV Canada	92–81	R. Howard (25)	Tied (14)	Clarendon (10)	Walter Pyramid; 3,874
Thursday, May 16	7:00 p.m.	New York	@	Indiana	Prime Video	102–66	Stewart (31)	Tied (10)	Tied (6)	Gainbridge Fieldhouse; 17,274
Friday, May 17	7:30 p.m.	Washington	@	Connecticut	ION; League Pass	77–84	Bonner (22)	Thomas (11)	Vanloo (8)	Mohegan Sun Arena; 6,874
Friday, May 17	9:30 p.m.	Seattle	@	Minnesota	ION; League Pass	93–102 (2OT)	Collier (29)	Tied (11)	Hiedeman (7)	Target Center; 7,208
Saturday, May 18	1:00 p.m.	Indiana	@	New York	USA: ABC; Canada: SN360	80–91	Stewart (24)	J. Jones (12)	Clark (8)	Barclays Center; 17,735
Saturday, May 18	3:00 p.m.	Los Angeles	@	Las Vegas	USA: ABC; Canada: NBA TV Canada	82–89	Hamby (29)	Wilson (10)	Young (11)	Michelob Ultra Arena; 10,286
Saturday, May 18	8:00 p.m.	Chicago	@	Dallas	NBA TV; League Pass	83–74	Ogunbowale (35)	E. Williams (10)	Mabrey (8)	College Park Center; 6,251
Saturday, May 18	10:00 p.m.	Atlanta	@	Phoenix	USA: NBA TV; League Pass; Canada: NBA TV Canada	85–88	Copper (38)	Mack (11)	Tied (5)	Footprint Center; 10,251
Sunday, May 19	3:00 p.m.	Seattle	@	Washington	League Pass	84–75	Loyd (19)	Magbegor (14)	Tied (5)	Entertainment and Sports Arena; 4,200
Monday, May 20	7:00 p.m.	Connecticut	@	Indiana	USA: ESPN; Canada: TSN1/3/4/5	88–84	Thomas (24)	Thomas (14)	Thomas (9)	Gainbridge Fieldhouse; 17,274
Monday, May 20	7:00 p.m.	Seattle	@	New York	ESPN3; League Pass	63–74	Ionescu (20)	Stewart (11)	Ionescu (8)	Barclays Center; 9,381
Tuesday, May 21	7:30 p.m.	Dallas	@	Atlanta	League Pass	78–83	Ogunbowale (24)	McCowan (14)	Uzun (8)	Gateway Center Arena; 3,265
Tuesday, May 21	10:00 p.m.	Phoenix	@	Las Vegas	League Pass	98–88	Copper (37)	Wilson (13)	Cloud (10)	Michelob Ultra Arena; 10,374
Tuesday, May 21	10:00 p.m.	Washington	@	Los Angeles	USA: League Pass; Canada: NBA TV Canada	68–70	L. Brown (20)	Hamby (18)	Vanloo (9)	Walter Pyramid; 3,627
Wednesday, May 22	10:00 p.m.	Indiana	@	Seattle	League Pass	83–85	Loyd (32)	Tied (11)	Clark (7)	Climate Pledge Arena; 18,343
Thursday, May 23	7:00 p.m.	Minnesota	@	Connecticut	USA: League Pass; Canada: NBA TV Canada	82–83 (OT)	Collier (31)	Collier (11)	C. Williams (7)	Mohegan Sun Arena; 6,152
Thursday, May 23	7:00 p.m.	Chicago	@	New York	Prime Video	90–81	Mabrey (21)	Stewart (10)	Tied (7)	Barclays Center; 12,049
Thursday, May 23	10:00 p.m.	Washington	@	Phoenix	Prime Video	80–83	Tied (20)	Mack (9)	Cloud (10)	Footprint Center; 7,474
Friday, May 24	10:00 p.m.	Indiana	@	Los Angeles	ION; League Pass	78–73	Tied (18)	Hamby (12)	Clark (8)	Crypto.com Arena; 19,103
Saturday, May 25	1:00 p.m.	New York	@	Minnesota	CBS	67–84	Stewart (20)	Collier (12)	Vandersloot (6)	Target Center; 7,010
Saturday, May 25	8:00 p.m.	Connecticut	@	Chicago	CBSSN; League Pass	86–82	Mabrey (23)	Bonner (8)	Thomas (6)	Wintrust Arena; 9,025
Saturday, May 25	9:00 p.m.	Indiana	@	Las Vegas	USA: NBA TV; League Pass; Canada: SN1	80–99	Wilson (29)	Wilson (15)	Tied (7)	Michelob Ultra Arena; 10,399
Saturday, May 25	9:00 p.m.	Washington	@	Seattle	League Pass	69–101	Ogwumike (19)	Russell (7)	Diggins-Smith (9)	Climate Pledge Arena; 8,846
Saturday, May 25	10:00 p.m.	Dallas	@	Phoenix	League Pass	107–92	Ogunbowale (40)	Siegrist (9)	Cloud (12)	Footprint Center; 8,339
Sunday, May 26	6:00 p.m.	Minnesota	@	Atlanta	USA: League Pass; Canada: NBA TV Canada	92–79	McBride (31)	Tied (8)	Collier (7)	Gateway Center Arena; 3,265
Sunday, May 26	9:00 p.m.	Dallas	@	Los Angeles	USA: League Pass; Canada: NBA TV Canada	84–83	Brink (21)	Hamby (13)	Uzun (8)	Crypto.com Arena; 10,340
Tuesday, May 28	7:00 p.m.	Phoenix	@	Connecticut	CBSSN; League Pass	47–70	Bonner (19)	Carrington (10)	Thomas (8)	Mohegan Sun Arena; 6,489
Tuesday, May 28	7:00 p.m.	Los Angeles	@	Indiana	USA: NBA TV; League Pass; Canada: TSN4/5	88–82	Clark (30)	Hamby (10)	Clark (6)	Gainbridge Fieldhouse; 16,013
Tuesday, May 28	8:00 p.m.	Seattle	@	Chicago	League Pass	77–68	Diggins-Smith (21)	Tied (12)	Loyd (6)	Wintrust Arena; 7,807
Wednesday, May 29	7:00 p.m.	Phoenix	@	New York	CBSSN; League Pass	78–81	Ionescu (22)	Copper (9)	Ionescu (9)	Barclays Center; 9,182
Wednesday, May 29	7:00 p.m.	Atlanta	@	Washington	League Pass	73–67	Atkins (21)	Charles (15)	Vanloo (5)	Entertainment and Sports Arena; 4,200
Wednesday, May 29	8:00 p.m.	Las Vegas	@	Minnesota	USA: NBA TV; League Pass; Canada: NBA TV Canada	80–66	Wilson (29)	Wilson (15)	Young (10)	Target Center; 7,409
Thursday, May 30	7:00 p.m.	Seattle	@	Indiana	Prime Video	103–88	N. Smith (23)	Boston (12)	Tied (9)	Gainbridge Fieldhouse; 15,022
Thursday, May 30	8:00 p.m.	Los Angeles	@	Chicago	USA: League Pass; Canada: NBA TV Canada	73–83	Hamby (24)	Hamby (13)	Mabrey (7)	Wintrust Arena; 7,911
Friday, May 31	7:30 p.m.	Las Vegas	@	Atlanta	ION; League Pass	74–78	Wilson (28)	Wilson (9)	Plum (6)	Gateway Center Arena; 4,015
Friday, May 31	7:30 p.m.	Dallas	@	Connecticut	ION; League Pass	72–74	B. Jones (22)	Thomas (9)	Thomas (14)	Mohegan Sun Arena; 7,638
Friday, May 31	7:30 p.m.	Washington	@	New York	ION; League Pass	79–90	Ionescu (24)	Stewart (15)	Vanloo (7)	Barclays Center; 9,878
Friday, May 31	9:30 p.m.	Phoenix	@	Minnesota	ION; League Pass	71–95	Copper (21)	Collier (11)	Cloud (7)	Target Center; 7,035

June

Date	Time (ET)	Matchup			TV	Result	High points	High rebounds	High assists	Location
Saturday, June 1
Saturday, June 1	1:00 p.m.	Chicago	@	Indiana	USA: ESPN; Canada: SN1	70–71	Carter (19)	Reese (13)	Tied (6)	Gainbridge Fieldhouse; 17,274
Sunday, June 2
Sunday, June 2	3:00 p.m.	Connecticut	@	Atlanta	USA: League Pass; Canada: NBA TV Canada	69–50	Bonner (18)	Thomas (14)	Thomas (11)	Gateway Center Arena; 3,265
Sunday, June 2	6:00 p.m.	Los Angeles	@	Phoenix	USA: League Pass; Canada: NBA TV Canada	68–87	Taurasi (31)	Mack (12)	Cloud (12)	Footprint Center; 10,207
Sunday, June 2	7:00 p.m.	Indiana	@	New York	USA: NBA TV; League Pass; Canada: SN360	68–104	Mitchell (21)	J. Jones (13)	Vandersloot (7)	Barclays Center; 17,401
Sunday, June 2	7:00 p.m.	Dallas	@	Minnesota	CBSSN; League Pass	76–87	McBride (25)	Billings (15)	Ogunbowale (6)	Target Center; 7,024
Tuesday, June 4
Tuesday, June 4	7:00 p.m.	Washington	@	Connecticut	USA: League Pass; Canada: NBA TV Canada	59–76	Bonner (20)	Edwards (9)	Thomas (7)	Mohegan Sun Arena; 5,346
Tuesday, June 4	8:00 p.m.	New York	@	Chicago	USA: NBA TV; League Pass; Canada: TSN3	88–75	Stewart (33)	Stewart (14)	Vandersloot (6)	Wintrust Arena; 8,277
Tuesday, June 4	10:00 p.m.	Phoenix	@	Seattle	CBSSN; League Pass	62–80	Magbegor (21)	Magbegor (9)	Loyd (6)	Climate Pledge Arena; 8,133
Wednesday, June 5
Wednesday, June 5	8:00 p.m.	Las Vegas	@	Dallas	USA: NBA TV; League Pass; Canada: NBA TV Canada	95–81	Wilson (36)	McCowan (15)	Tied (7)	College Park Center; 6,251
Wednesday, June 5	10:00 p.m.	Minnesota	@	Los Angeles	USA: League Pass; Canada: NBA TV Canada	86–62	Collier (25)	Hamby (11)	3 tied (4)	Crypto.com Arena; 8,104
Thursday, June 6
Thursday, June 6	7:00 p.m.	Chicago	@	Washington	Prime Video	79–71	Carter (25)	Edwards (14)	Vanloo (7)	Capital One Arena; 10,000
Thursday, June 6	7:30 p.m.	New York	@	Atlanta	League Pass	78–61	Stewart (25)	Stewart (10)	4 tied (5)	Gateway Center Arena; 3,255
Friday, June 7
Friday, June 7	7:30 p.m.	Indiana	@	Washington	ION; League Pass	85–83	Clark (30)	Edwards (10)	Tied (6)	Capital One Arena; 20,333
Friday, June 7	10:00 p.m.	Seattle	@	Las Vegas	ION; League Pass	78–65	Wilson (29)	Magbegor (15)	Diggins-Smith (7)	Michelob Ultra Arena; 10,380
Friday, June 7	10:00 p.m.	Dallas	@	Los Angeles	ION; League Pass	72–81	Tied (22)	Tied (12)	Tied (6)	Crypto.com Arena; 10,123
Friday, June 7	10:00 p.m.	Minnesota	@	Phoenix	ION; League Pass	80–81	Copper (34)	Collier (12)	Cloud (10)	Footprint Center; 9,052
Saturday, June 8
Saturday, June 8	1:00 p.m.	New York	@	Connecticut	USA: ABC; Canada: NBA TV Canada	82–75	Ionescu (24)	Thomas (12)	Thomas (7)	Mohegan Sun Arena; 8,910
Saturday, June 8	5:00 p.m.	Atlanta	@	Chicago	USA: NBA TV; League Pass; Canada: NBA TV Canada	89–80	Charles (22)	Reese (13)	R. Howard (10)	Wintrust Arena; 8,804
Sunday, June 9
Sunday, June 9	3:00 p.m.	Washington	@	New York	League Pass	88–93	J. Jones (29)	Laney-Hamilton (10)	Ionescu (8)	Barclays Center; 12,477
Sunday, June 9	4:00 p.m.	Phoenix	@	Dallas	League Pass	97–90 (OT)	Copper (29)	Billings (11)	Ogunbowale (10)	College Park Center; 5,568
Sunday, June 9	7:00 p.m.	Seattle	@	Minnesota	USA: League Pass; Canada: NBA TV Canada	64–83	McBride (32)	Collier (14)	Tied (7)	Target Center; 7,121
Sunday, June 9	9:00 p.m.	Las Vegas	@	Los Angeles	USA: League Pass; Canada: NBA TV Canada	92–96	Wilson (31)	Hamby (10)	4 tied (5)	Crypto.com Arena; 13,900
Monday, June 10
Monday, June 10	7:00 p.m.	Indiana	@	Connecticut	USA: NBA TV; League Pass; Canada: TSN1/3/4/5	72–89	Carrington (22)	Thomas (18)	Thomas (7)	Mohegan Sun Arena; 8,910
Tuesday, June 11
Tuesday, June 11	7:30 p.m.	Washington	@	Atlanta	League Pass	87–68	Tied (18)	Charles (9)	Tied (5)	Gateway Center Arena; 3,260
Tuesday, June 11	10:00 p.m.	Minnesota	@	Las Vegas	USA: NBA TV; League Pass; Canada: NBA TV Canada	100–86	Wilson (28)	Stokes (9)	C. Williams (9)	Michelob Ultra Arena; 10,368
Tuesday, June 11	10:00 p.m.	Los Angeles	@	Seattle	League Pass	79–95	Ogwumike (26)	Magbegor (13)	Diggins-Smith (6)	Climate Pledge Arena; 8,202
Wednesday, June 12
Wednesday, June 12	8:00 p.m.	Connecticut	@	Chicago	USA: League Pass; Canada: NBA TV Canada	83–75	Tied (20)	Reese (10)	Harris (7)	Wintrust Arena; 7,815
Thursday, June 13
Thursday, June 13	7:00 p.m.	Atlanta	@	Indiana	ESPN3; League Pass	84–91	Boston (27)	Boston (13)	Clark (6)	Gainbridge Fieldhouse; 16,651
Thursday, June 13	7:00 p.m.	Seattle	@	Dallas	USA: ESPN; Canada: NBA TV Canada	92–84	Ogunbowale (24)	Tied (10)	Tied (6)	College Park Center; 5,568
Thursday, June 13	10:00 p.m.	Las Vegas	@	Phoenix	Prime Video	103–99	Young (34)	Wilson (15)	Cloud (6)	Footprint Center; 9,325
Friday, June 14	7:30 p.m.	Chicago	@	Washington	ION; League Pass	81–83	Atkins (29)	Reese (14)	Dolson (5)	Entertainment and Sports Arena; 4,200
Friday, June 14	7:30 p.m.	Los Angeles	@	Minnesota	ION; League Pass	76–81	Collier (30)	Hamby (11)	C. Williams (10)	Target Center; 8,117
Saturday, June 15	1:00 p.m.	Connecticut	@	Dallas	CBS	85–67	3 tied (16)	McCowan (10)	Thomas (9)	College Park Center; 5,977
Saturday, June 15	3:00 p.m.	New York	@	Las Vegas	USA: ABC; Canada: SN1	90–82	J. Jones (34)	Tied (12)	Ionescu (12)	Michelob Ultra Arena; 10,424
Sunday, June 16	12:00 p.m.	Chicago	@	Indiana	CBS	83–91	Clark (23)	Boston (14)	Clark (9)	Gainbridge Fieldhouse; 17,274
Sunday, June 16	3:00 p.m.	Seattle	@	Phoenix	USA: ABC; Canada: NBA TV Canada	78–87	Copper (30)	Ogwumike (11)	Tied (8)	Footprint Center; 9,444
Sunday, June 16	3:00 p.m.	Los Angeles	@	Atlanta	ESPN3; League Pass	74–87	A. Gray (25)	Charles (11)	Tied (5)	Gateway Center Arena; 3,260
Monday, June 17	8:00 p.m.	Dallas	@	Minnesota	USA: League Pass; Canada: NBA TV Canada	78–90	McBride (19)	Billings (10)	Billings (9)	Target Center; 8,314
Tuesday, June 18	7:00 p.m.	Los Angeles	@	Connecticut	USA: NBA TV; League Pass; Canada: TSN4/5	70–79	Bonner (16)	3 tied (7)	Tied (7)	Mohegan Sun Arena; 7,853
Tuesday, June 18	10:00 p.m.	New York	@	Phoenix	CBSSN; League Pass	93–99	Stewart (28)	Tied (9)	Ionescu (8)	Footprint Center; 9,824
Wednesday, June 19	7:00 p.m.	Washington	@	Indiana	USA: NBA TV; League Pass; Canada: SN1	81–88	Atkins (27)	Clark (12)	Vanloo (8)	Gainbridge Fieldhouse; 17,274
Wednesday, June 19	8:00 p.m.	Atlanta	@	Minnesota	League Pass	55–68	Collier (16)	Juhász (11)	C. Williams (6)	Target Center; 8,206
Wednesday, June 19	10:00 p.m.	Seattle	@	Las Vegas	USA: NBA TV; League Pass; Canada: NBA TV Canada	83–94	Young (32)	Magbegor (13)	Plum (8)	Michelob Ultra Arena; 10,380
Thursday, June 20	12:00 p.m.	Dallas	@	Chicago	League Pass	72–83	Ogunbowale (31)	Reese (18)	Uzun (6)	Wintrust Arena; 9,025
Thursday, June 20	7:00 p.m.	Los Angeles	@	New York	Prime Video	80–93	Ionescu (31)	Tied (11)	Ionescu (9)	Barclays Center; 10,955
Friday, June 21	7:30 p.m.	Indiana	@	Atlanta	ION; League Pass	91–79	Charles (24)	Boston (10)	Clark (7)	State Farm Arena; 17,575
Friday, June 21	10:00 p.m.	Connecticut	@	Las Vegas	ION; League Pass	74–85	Wilson (26)	Wilson (16)	Thomas (7)	Michelob Ultra Arena; 10,385
Saturday, June 22	3:00 p.m.	Dallas	@	Washington	ESPN3; League Pass	69–97	Engstler (23)	Dolson (10)	Vanloo	Entertainment and Sports Arena; 4,200
Saturday, June 22	3:00 p.m.	Los Angeles	@	New York	USA: ESPN; League Pass; Canada: NBA TV Canada	88–98	Stewart (33)	J. Jones (13)	Ionescu (9)	Barclays Center; 13,639
Saturday, June 22	8:00 p.m.	Phoenix	@	Minnesota	USA: NBA TV; League Pass; Canada: NBA TV Canada	60–73	Collier (23)	Collier (14)	Tied (5)	Target Center; 9,769
Sunday, June 23	3:00 p.m.	New York	@	Atlanta	ESPN3; League Pass	96–75	Ionescu (26)	J. Jones (11)	Ionescu (11)	Gateway Center Arena; 3,260
Sunday, June 23	3:00 p.m.	Dallas	@	Washington	ESPN3; League Pass	84–92	N. Howard (26)	Billings (14)	Tied (7)	Entertainment and Sports Arena; 4,200
Sunday, June 23	3:00 p.m.	Connecticut	@	Seattle	ESPN3; League Pass	61–72	Loyd (16)	Thomas (14)	Diggins-Simth (8)	Climate Pledge Arena; 9,935
Sunday, June 23	4:00 p.m.	Indiana	@	Chicago	USA: ESPN; Canada: SN1	87–88	Reese (25)	Reese (16)	Clark (13)	Wintrust Arena; 9,872
Tuesday, June 25	8:00 p.m.	Minnesota	@	New York	Amazon Prime Video	94–89	Tied (23)	Stewart (11)	C. Williams (8)	UBS Arena; 7,015
Thursday, June 27	1:00 p.m.	Minnesota	@	Dallas	USA: League Pass; Canada: NBA TV Canada	88–94	Collier (29)	McCowan (12)	Ogunbowale (9)	College Park Center; 6,251
Thursday, June 27	7:00 p.m.	Connecticut	@	Washington	USA: NBA TV; League Pass; Canada: TSN5	94–91 (OT)	Bonner (24)	Bonner (10)	Tied (6)	Entertainment and Sports Arena; 4,200
Thursday, June 27	7:00 p.m.	Las Vegas	@	Chicago	Prime Video	95–83	Wilson (31)	Reese (11)	Tied (5)	Wintrust Arena; 9,025
Thursday, June 27	10:00 p.m.	Indiana	@	Seattle	Prime Video	77–89	Loyd (34)	Boston (14)	Diggins-Smith (9)	Climate Pledge Arena; 18,343
Friday, June 28	7:30 p.m.	Atlanta	@	Connecticut	ION; League Pass	78–74	Tied (17)	Thomas (7)	Thomas (8)	Mohegan Sun Arena; 7,008
Friday, June 28	10:00 p.m.	Los Angeles	@	Phoenix	ION; League Pass	78–92	Hamby (29)	Griner (11)	McDonald (10)	Footprint Center; 14,363
Saturday, June 29	2:00 p.m.	Las Vegas	@	Washington	USA: League Pass; Canada: NBA TV Canada	88–77	Young (26)	Wilson (9)	Tied (8)	Entertainment and Sports Arena; 4,200
Saturday, June 29	9:00 p.m.	Dallas	@	Seattle	USA: NBA TV; League Pass; Canada: NBA TV Canada	76–97	Loyd (30)	Horston (11)	Tied (5)	Climate Pledge Arena; 9,080
Sunday, June 30	1:00 p.m.	Atlanta	@	New York	USA: ESPN; Canada: NBA TV Canada	75–81	A. Gray (24)	Tied (12)	Canada (9)	Barclays Center; 10,823
Sunday, June 30	3:00 p.m.	Minnesota	@	Chicago	ESPN3; League Pass	70–62	McBride (16)	Reese (16)	Allen (7)	Wintrust Arena; 9,025
Sunday, June 30	3:00 p.m.	Indiana	@	Phoenix	USA: ESPN; Canada: NBA TV Canada	88–82	Griner (24)	N. Smith (15)	Clark (12)	Footprint Center; 17,071

July

Date	Time (ET)	Matchup			TV	Result	High points	High rebounds	High assists	Location
Monday, July 1	10:00 p.m.	Connecticut	@	Phoenix	League Pass	83–72	Tied (21)	Thomas (12)	Cloud (10)	Footprint Center; 8,445
Monday, July 1	10:00 p.m.	Dallas	@	Seattle	USA: NBA TV; League Pass; Canada: NBA TV Canada	71–95	Loyd (26)	Magbegor (7)	Sims (6)	Climate Pledge Arena; 7,202
Tuesday, July 2	7:00 p.m.	Minnesota	@	New York	League Pass	67–76	J. Jones (21)	Stewart (17)	Tied (6)	Barclays Center; 10,846
Tuesday, July 2	7:30 p.m.	Chicago	@	Atlanta	CBSSN; League Pass	85–77	Carter (26)	Reese (19)	Canada (7)	Gateway Center Arena; 3,260
Tuesday, July 2	9:30 p.m.	Indiana	@	Las Vegas	USA: ESPN; Canada: TSN3	69–88	Plum (34)	N. Smith (14)	Clark (11)	T-Mobile Arena; 20,366
Tuesday, July 2	9:30 p.m.	Washington	@	Los Angeles	USA: ESPN3; League Pass; Canada: NBA TV Canada	82–80	Tied (17)	Hamby (11)	Hamby (7)	Crypto.com Arena; 9,164
Wednesday, July 3	8:00 p.m.	Phoenix	@	Dallas	USA: NBA TV; League Pass; Canada: NBA TV Canada	104–96	N. Howard (36)	N. Howard (11)	Cloud (10)	College Park Center; 6,129
Thursday, July 4	8:00 p.m.	Connecticut	@	Minnesota	Prime Video	78–73	Bonner (24)	Thomas (10)	Thomas (14)	Target Center; 7,508
Thursday, July 4	10:00 p.m.	Washington	@	Las Vegas	Prime Video	77–98	Plum (28)	Wilson (9)	Young (10)	Michelob Ultra Arena; 10,376
Friday, July 5	7:30 p.m.	Atlanta	@	Dallas	ION; League Pass	82–85	Tied (19)	McCowan (11)	A. Gray (8)	College Park Center; 5,872
Friday, July 5	10:00 p.m.	Las Vegas	@	Los Angeles	ION; League Pass	93–98 (OT)	Wilson (35)	Hamby (14)	Talbot (9)	Crypto.com Arena; 13,840
Friday, July 5	10:00 p.m.	Chicago	@	Seattle	ION; League Pass	88–84	Carter (33)	Reese (10)	Diggins-Smith (9)	Climate Pledge Arena; 10,725
Saturday, July 6	1:00 p.m.	New York	@	Indiana	CBS	78–83	Ionescu (22)	Tied (12)	Clark (13)	Gainbridge Fieldhouse; 17,274
Saturday, July 6	8:00 p.m.	Washington	@	Minnesota	League Pass	67–74	Tied (17)	Tied (11)	C. Williams (7)	Target Center; 7,610
Sunday, July 7	1:00 p.m.	Atlanta	@	Connecticut	USA: League Pass; Canada: NBA TV Canada	67–80	Bonner (23)	Amihere (8)	Thomas (9)	Mohegan Sun Arena; 7,527
Sunday, July 7	3:00 p.m.	Dallas	@	Las Vegas	ESPN	85–104	Wilson (28)	Wilson (10)	Tied (5)	Michelob Ultra Arena; 10,369
Sunday, July 7	6:00 p.m.	Chicago	@	Seattle	League Pass	71–84	Ogwumike (24)	Reese (14)	Diggins-Smith (8)	Climate Pledge Arena; 11,283
Sunday, July 7	7:00 p.m.	Phoenix	@	Los Angeles	League Pass	84–78	Cloud (35)	Copper (10)	McDonald (6)	Crypto.com Arena; 11,618
Tuesday, July 9	10:00 p.m.	Minnesota	@	Los Angeles	League Pass	82–67	Hamby (18)	Hamby (8)	C. Williams (5)	Crypto.com Arena; 9,533
Wednesday, July 10	11:00 a.m.	New York	@	Connecticut	League Pass	71–68	Bonner (22)	Stewart (14)	Thomas (8)	Mohegan Sun Arena; 8,910
Wednesday, July 10	12:00 p.m.	Washington	@	Indiana	USA: NBA TV; League Pass; Canada: SN	89–84	Clark (29)	Tied (9)	Clark (13)	Gainbridge Fieldhouse; 17,274
Wednesday, July 10	12:00 p.m.	Atlanta	@	Chicago	League Pass	69–78	A. Gray (20)	Reese (13)	Tied (5)	Wintrust Arena; 9,025
Wednesday, July 10	3:00 p.m.	Las Vegas	@	Seattle	League Pass	84–79	Loyd (28)	Wilson (20)	Diggins-Smith (8)	Climate Pledge Arena; 12,500
Wednesday, July 10	3:30 p.m.	Dallas	@	Phoenix	League Pass	84–100	Copper (32)	McCowan (10)	Ogunbowale (13)	Footprint Center; 11,601
Thursday, July 11	7:00 p.m.	Chicago	@	New York	Prime Video	76–91	Carter (22)	J. Jones (13)	Allen (7)	Barclays Center; 17,758
Friday, July 12	7:30 p.m.	Las Vegas	@	Atlanta	ION; League Pass	84–70	Wilson (33)	Wilson (18)	Plum (7)	Gateway Center Arena; 3,344
Friday, July 12	7:30 p.m.	Phoenix	@	Indiana	ION; League Pass	86–95	Copper (36)	Boston (13)	Clark (13)	Gainbridge Fieldhouse; 17,274
Friday, July 12	10:00 p.m.	Minnesota	@	Seattle	ION; League Pass	63–91	McBride (27)	Tied (8)	Diggins-Smith (12)	Climate Pledge Arena; 8,320
Saturday, July 13	1:00 p.m.	New York	@	Chicago	USA: ABC; Canada: TSN2	81–67	Ionescu (28)	Reese (16)	Tied (7)	Wintrust Arena; 9,025
Saturday, July 13	3:30 p.m.	Los Angeles	@	Dallas	CBS	87–81	Hamby (27)	Stevens (8)	Tied (5)	College Park Center; 6,251
Sunday, July 14	1:00 p.m.	Phoenix	@	Connecticut	USA: ABC; Canada: NBA TV Canada	69–96	Banham (24)	Carrington (11)	Harris (7)	Mohegan Sun Arena; 8,910
Sunday, July 14	3:00 p.m.	Las Vegas	@	Washington	CBSSN; League Pass	89–77	Atkins (36)	Wilson (17)	Vanloo (7)	Entertainment and Sports Arena; 4,200
Sunday, July 14	4:00 p.m.	Indiana	@	Minnesota	USA: ESPN; Canada: TSN3	81–74	Mitchell (21)	Boston (16)	C. Williams (7)	Target Center; 18,978
Sunday, July 14	6:00 p.m.	Atlanta	@	Seattle	League Pass	70–81	Caldwell (19)	Ogwumike (12)	Loyd (7)	Climate Pledge Arena; 10,036
Tuesday, July 16	11:30 a.m.	Phoenix	@	Washington	League Pass	96–87	Griner (23)	Hines-Allen (12)	Cloud (10)	Capital One Arena; 12,586
Tuesday, July 16	3:30 p.m.	Seattle	@	Los Angeles	USA: League Pass; Canada: NBA TV Canada	89–83	Loyd (30)	Stevens (15)	Loyd (7)	Crypto.com Arena; 18,724
Tuesday, July 16	7:00 p.m.	Connecticut	@	New York	Prime Video	74–82	Ionescu (30)	Tied (8)	Tied (5)	Barclays Center; 13,694
Tuesday, July 16	10:00 p.m.	Chicago	@	Las Vegas	Prime Video	93–85	Carter (34)	Wilson (14)	Tied (5)	Michelob Ultra Arena; 10,396
Wednesday, July 17	1:00 p.m.	Atlanta	@	Minnesota	USA: League Pass; Canada: NBA TV Canada	86–79	McBride (30)	A. Smith (10)	C. Williams (9)	Target Center; 15,013
Wednesday, July 17	8:00 p.m.	Indiana	@	Dallas	USA: ESPN; Canada: SN	101–93	Boston (28)	N. Smith (12)	Clark (19)	College Park Center; 6,251
Saturday, July 20	8:30 p.m.	WNBA All-Star Game			USA: ABC; Canada: TSN5, SN1	109–117	Ogunbowale (34)	Reese (15)	Clark (10)	Footprint Center; 16,407

August

Date	Time (ET)	Matchup			TV	Result	High points	High rebounds	High assists	Location
Thursday, August 15	8:00 p.m.	Phoenix	@	Chicago	Prime Video	85–65	Copper (29)	Reese (15)	Tied (6)	Wintrust Arena; 9,025
Thursday, August 15	8:00 p.m.	Washington	@	Minnesota	ESPN3; League Pass	68–79	Collier (17)	Collier (12)	C. Williams (5)	Target Center; 7,224
Thursday, August 15	9:00 p.m.	New York	@	Los Angeles	USA: ESPN; Canada: SN1	103–68	Stewart (27)	Hamby (13)	Ionescu (6)	Crypto.com Arena; 11,120
Friday, August 16	7:30 p.m.	Seattle	@	Atlanta	ION; League Pass	81–83	R. Howard (30)	Hillmon (13)	Canada (8)	Gateway Center Arena; 3,260
Friday, August 16	7:30 p.m.	Phoenix	@	Indiana	ION; League Pass	89–98	Copper (32)	Tied (9)	Clark (10)	Gainbridge Fieldhouse; 17,274
Friday, August 16	9:30 p.m.	Connecticut	@	Dallas	USA: ION; League Pass; Canada: TSN2	109–91	Bonner (29)	N. Howard (11)	Thomas (14)	College Park Center; 6,191
Saturday, August 17	2:00 p.m.	Minnesota	@	Washington	CBS	99–83	Collier (30)	Tied (7)	Sykes (7)	Entertainment and Sports Arena; 4,200
Saturday, August 17	4:00 p.m.	New York	@	Las Vegas	CBS	79–67	Wilson (24)	J. Jones (17)	J. Jones (7)	Michelob Ultra Arena; 10,397
Saturday, August 17	5:00 p.m.	Chicago	@	Los Angeles	USA: League Pass; Canada: NBA TV Canada	90–86	Tied (16)	Cardoso (14)	Tied (6)	Crypto.com Arena; 16,551
Sunday, August 18	3:00 p.m.	Connecticut	@	Atlanta	USA: ESPN3; League Pass; Canada: NBA TV Canada	70–82	Charles (22)	Charles (15)	Tied (6)	Gateway Center Arena; 3,330
Sunday, August 18	3:30 p.m.	Seattle	@	Indiana	USA: ABC; Canada: SN1	75–92	Mitchell (27)	Boston (15)	Clark (9)	Gainbridge Fieldhouse; 17,274
Sunday, August 18	6:00 p.m.	Los Angeles	@	Las Vegas	USA: NBA TV; League Pass; Canada: NBA TV Canada	71–87	Wilson (34)	Wilson (13)	Tied (4)	Michelob Ultra Arena; 10,311
Sunday, August 18	9:00 p.m.	Chicago	@	Phoenix	League Pass	68–86	Taurasi (23)	Reese (20)	Carter (6)	Footprint Center; 14,267
Tuesday, August 20	7:00 p.m.	Los Angeles	@	Connecticut	USA: League Pass; Canada: NBA TV Canada	61–69	Carrington (19)	Thomas (16)	Thomas (8)	TD Garden; 19,125
Tuesday, August 20	7:00 p.m.	Dallas	@	New York	USA: NBA TV; League Pass; Canada: TSN4/5	74–94	Stewart (26)	Tied (12)	Vandersloot (11)	Barclays Center; 11,455
Tuesday, August 20	7:00 p.m.	Seattle	@	Washington	League Pass	83–77	Atkins (25)	Magbegor (14)	Vanloo (6)	Entertainment and Sports Arena; 4,200
Wednesday, August 21	7:30 p.m.	Phoenix	@	Atlanta	League Pass	63–72	Copper (22)	Charles (17)	Canada (6)	Gateway Center Arena; 3,260
Wednesday, August 21	9:30 p.m.	Minnesota	@	Las Vegas	USA: ESPN; Canada: TSN1/3, NBA TV Canada	98–87	Young (26)	Wilson (9)	C. Williams (10)	Michelob Ultra Arena; 10,429
Thursday, August 22	7:00 p.m.	Dallas	@	New York	Prime Video	71–79	Tied (19)	J. Jones (13)	Ogunbowale (8)	Barclays Center; 10,986
Friday, August 23	7:30 p.m.	Phoenix	@	Atlanta	ION; League Pass	82–80	Tied (22)	Charles (13)	Cloud (7)	Gateway Center Arena; 3,260
Friday, August 23	7:30 p.m.	Chicago	@	Connecticut	USA: ION; League Pass; Canada: TSN2	80–82	Mabrey (24)	Reese (20)	Thomas (11)	Mohegan Sun Arena; 8,910
Friday, August 23	7:30 p.m.	Los Angeles	@	Washington	ION; League Pass	74–80	Sykes (28)	Austin (11)	Dolson (8)	Entertainment and Sports Arena; 4,200
Friday, August 23	9:30 p.m.	Las Vegas	@	Minnesota	ION; League Pass	74–87	Collier (27)	Collier (18)	Collier (5)	Target Center; 9,124
Saturday, August 24	7:00 p.m.	Connecticut	@	New York	League Pass	72–64	Tied (15)	Stewart (15)	Thomas (8)	Barclays Center; 13,098
Saturday, August 24	8:00 p.m.	Indiana	@	Minnesota	USA: NBA TV; League Pass; Canada: NBA TV Canada	80–90	Collier (31)	Boston (15)	Clark (8)	Target Center; 19,023
Sunday, August 25	12:00 p.m.	Las Vegas	@	Chicago	CBS	77–75	Carter (25)	Reese (22)	C. Gray (7)	Wintrust Arena; 9,025
Sunday, August 25	4:00 p.m.	Los Angeles	@	Dallas	USA: NBA TV; League Pass; Canada: NBA TV Canada	110–113	Ogunbowale (33)	McCowan (11)	Sims (10)	College Park Center; 5,925
Monday, August 26	7:30 p.m.	Indiana	@	Atlanta	USA: NBA TV; League Pass; Canada: TSN5	84–79	Mitchell (29)	Boston (11)	Clark (7)	State Farm Arena; 17,608
Monday, August 26	10:00 p.m.	New York	@	Phoenix	USA: NBA TV; League Pass; Canada: NBA TV Canada	84–70	Griner (22)	J. Jones (7)	Cloud (7)	Footprint Center; 10,299
Monday, August 26	10:00 p.m.	Washington	@	Seattle	League Pass	74–72	Sykes (20)	Tied (10)	Diggins-Smith (8)	Climate Pledge Arena; 9,535
Tuesday, August 27	8:00 p.m.	Las Vegas	@	Dallas	USA: NBA TV; League Pass; Canada: NBA TV Canada	90–93	Wilson (42)	McCowan (17)	Tied (6)	College Park Center; 6,251
Wednesday, August 28	7:00 p.m.	Connecticut	@	Indiana	USA: NBA TV; League Pass; Canada: SN1	80–84	Mitchell (23)	Tied (8)	Boston (8)	Gainbridge Fieldhouse; 17,274
Wednesday, August 28	8:00 p.m.	Washington	@	Chicago	League Pass	74–70	Dolson (17)	Reese (14)	Cardoso (6)	Wintrust Arena; 8,763
Wednesday, August 28	10:00 p.m.	New York	@	Los Angeles	USA: NBA TV; League Pass; Canada: NBA TV Canada	88–94	Stewart (32)	N. Sabally (10)	Vandersloot (13)	Crypto.com Arena; 10,403
Wednesday, August 28	10:00 p.m.	Minnesota	@	Phoenix	League Pass	89–76	McBride (19)	Collier (8)	Cloud (8)	Footprint Center; 9,482
Wednesday, August 28	10:00 p.m.	Atlanta	@	Seattle	League Pass	81–85	Loyd (28)	Charles (17)	Charles (10)	Climate Pledge Arena; 9,228
Friday, August 30	7:30 p.m.	Indiana	@	Chicago	USA: ION; League Pass; Canada: TSN5	100–81	Clark (31)	Reese (11)	Clark (12)	Wintrust Arena; 9,445
Friday, August 30	7:30 p.m.	Minnesota	@	Dallas	ION; League Pass	76–94	Ogunbowale (25)	McCowan (11)	Ogunbowale (8)	College Park Center; 5,581
Friday, August 30	10:00 p.m.	Atlanta	@	Las Vegas	ION; League Pass	72–83	Wilson (26)	Wilson (16)	A. Gray (6)	Michelob Ultra Arena; 10,397
Friday, August 30	10:00 p.m.	New York	@	Seattle	ION; League Pass	98–85	Stewart (32)	J. Jones (11)	Ionescu (8)	Climate Pledge Arena; 16,800
Saturday, August 31	3:00 p.m.	Connecticut	@	Washington	USA: League Pass; Canada: NBA TV Canada	96–85	Mabrey (21)	Dolson (7)	Harris (6)	Entertainment and Sports Arena; 4,200

September

Date	Time (ET)	Matchup			TV	Result	High points	High rebounds	High assists	Location
Sunday, September 1	1:00 p.m.	Seattle	@	Connecticut	USA: NBA TV; League Pass; Canada: NBA TV Canada	86–93	Loyd (27)	Ogwumike (11)	Thomas (8)	Mohegan Sun Arena; 8,910
Sunday, September 1	3:00 p.m.	Chicago	@	Minnesota	League Pass	74–79	Tied (22)	Reese (19)	Tied (9)	Target Center; 8,421
Sunday, September 1	4:00 p.m.	Indiana	@	Dallas	USA: NBA TV; League Pass; Canada: SN1	100–93	Mitchell (36)	McCowan (11)	Clark (12)	College Park Center; 6,251
Sunday, September 1	4:00 p.m.	Las Vegas	@	Phoenix	League Pass	97–79	Wilson (41)	Wilson (17)	Young (14)	Footprint Center; 13,981
Sunday, September 1	7:00 p.m.	Atlanta	@	Los Angeles	USA: League Pass; Canada: NBA TV Canada	80–62	Charles (23)	Charles (10)	Tied (6)	Crypto.com Arena; 11,165
Tuesday, September 3	7:00 p.m.	Seattle	@	Connecticut	USA: League Pass; Canada: TSN3	71–64	Bonner (26)	Tied (7)	Tied (7)	Mohegan Sun Arena; 7,454
Tuesday, September 3	8:00 p.m.	Washington	@	Dallas	League Pass	90–86	Ogunbowale (21)	McCowan (13)	Tied (5)	College Park Center; 5,129
Tuesday, September 3	10:00 p.m.	Chicago	@	Las Vegas	USA: NBA TV; League Pass; Canada: TSN3	71–90	Wilson (30)	Reese (16)	C. Gray (10)	T-Mobile Arena; 18,394
Tuesday, September 3	10:00 p.m.	Atlanta	@	Phoenix	League Pass	66–74	R. Howard (31)	Charles (12)	Canada (6)	Footprint Center; 7,639
Wednesday, September 4	7:00 p.m.	Los Angeles	@	Indiana	CBSSN; League Pass	86–93	Tied (24)	Boston (14)	Clark (10)	Gainbridge Fieldhouse; 16,645
Thursday, September 5	7:00 p.m.	Seattle	@	New York	Prime Video	70–77	Diggins-Smith (21)	J. Jones (8)	Ionescu (8)	Barclays Center; 10,873
Thursday, September 5	10:00 p.m.	Washington	@	Phoenix	Prime Video	90–77	Samuelson (19)	Mack (9)	Taylor (6)	Footprint Center; 7,709
Friday, September 6	7:30 p.m.	Dallas	@	Atlanta	ION; League Pass	96–107 (OT)	R. Howard (33)	Charles (13)	Canada (10)	Gateway Center Arena; 3,260
Friday, September 6	7:30 p.m.	Las Vegas	@	Connecticut	ION; League Pass	72–67	Plum (27)	Thomas (10)	Thomas (8)	Mohegan Sun Arena; 8,910
Friday, September 6	7:30 p.m.	Minnesota	@	Indiana	ION; League Pass	99–88	Collier (26)	Collier (10)	Clark (8)	Gainbridge Fieldhouse; 17,274
Friday, September 6	9:30 p.m.	Los Angeles	@	Chicago	USA: ION; League Pass; Canada: TSN2	78–92	Reese (24)	Reese (12)	Carter (7)	Wintrust Arena; 9,025
Saturday, September 7	9:00 p.m.	Phoenix	@	Seattle	USA: NBA TV; League Pass; Canada: NBA TV Canada	66–90	Loyd (20)	Tied (8)	Diggins-Smith (11)	Climate Pledge Arena; 14,066
Sunday, September 8	3:00 p.m.	Minnesota	@	Washington	ESPN3; League Pass	78–71	Collier (19)	Collier (12)	Tied (4)	Entertainment and Sports Arena; 4,200
Sunday, September 8	4:00 p.m.	Atlanta	@	Indiana	ESPN3; League Pass	100–104 (OT)	R. Howard (36)	Boston (13)	Clark (12)	Gainbridge Fieldhouse; 17,274
Sunday, September 8	4:00 p.m.	Las Vegas	@	New York	USA: ESPN; Canada: TSN2	71–75	Plum (25)	Stewart (11)	Tied (6)	Barclays Center; 15,393
Sunday, September 8	6:00 p.m.	Dallas	@	Chicago	League Pass	77–92	Carter (28)	Cardoso (11)	S. Sabally (7)	Wintrust Arena; 8,704
Sunday, September 8	9:00 p.m.	Connecticut	@	Los Angeles	USA: League Pass; Canada: SN	79–67	Jackson (23)	Thomas (10)	Thomas (11)	Crypto.com Arena; 10,627
Tuesday, September 10	7:30 p.m.	Minnesota	@	Atlanta	USA: NBA TV; League Pass; Canada: TSN4/5	76–64	A. Gray (17)	Charles (14)	C. Williams (7)	Gateway Center Arena; 3,260
Tuesday, September 10	8:00 p.m.	New York	@	Dallas	CBSSN; League Pass	105–91	Stewart (27)	Tied (7)	Ionescu (11)	College Park Center; 5,157
Tuesday, September 10	10:00 p.m.	Connecticut	@	Los Angeles	USA: League Pass; Canada: NBA TV Canada	86–66	Mabrey (26)	Stevens (17)	Thomas (12)	Crypto.com Arena; 8,253
Wednesday, September 11	7:00 p.m.	Las Vegas	@	Indiana	USA: NBA TV; League Pass; Canada: TSN1/3/4/5	86–75	Wilson (27)	Wilson (12)	Clark (6)	Gainbridge Fieldhouse; 17,274
Wednesday, September 11	8:00 p.m.	Washington	@	Chicago	League Pass	89–58	Carter (16)	Edwards (10)	Sykes (7)	Wintrust Arena; 7,948
Wednesday, September 11	10:00 p.m.	Seattle	@	Los Angeles	USA: NBA TV; League Pass; Canada: TSN1/4	90–82	Diggins-Smith (26)	Stevens (15)	Sims (6)	Crypto.com Arena; 9,561
Thursday, September 12	8:00 p.m.	New York	@	Dallas	Prime Video	99–67	Ionescu (20)	McCowan (9)	Ionescu (6)	College Park Center; 5,384
Friday, September 13	7:30 p.m.	Washington	@	Atlanta	ION; League Pass	72–69	Sykes (20)	Hillmon (11)	A. Gray (5)	Gateway Center Arena; 3,260
Friday, September 13	7:30 p.m.	Las Vegas	@	Indiana	USA: ION; League Pass; Canada: TSN3/4	78–74	C. Gray (21)	Wilson (17)	Clark (9)	Gainbridge Fieldhouse; 17,274
Friday, September 13	7:30 p.m.	Seattle	@	Dallas	ION; League Pass	83–81	McCowan (23)	McCowan (15)	Tied (6)	College Park Center; 5,728
Friday, September 13	7:30 p.m.	Chicago	@	Minnesota	ION; League Pass	66–83	Collier (20)	A. Smith (12)	C. Williams (10)	Target Center; 8,810
Friday, September 13	10:00 p.m.	Connecticut	@	Phoenix	ION; League Pass	88–69	Griner (26)	Tied (9)	Thomas (11)	Footprint Center; 14,190
Sunday, September 15	3:00 p.m.	Dallas	@	Indiana	USA: NBA TV; League Pass; Canada: SN1	109–110	Clark (35)	N. Howard (10)	Clark (8)	Gainbridge Fieldhouse; 17,274
Sunday, September 15	3:00 p.m.	Minnesota	@	New York	League Pass	88–79	Stewart (38)	Stewart (18)	Ionescu (8)	Barclays Center; 14,246
Sunday, September 15	3:00 p.m.	Atlanta	@	Washington	League Pass	76–73 (OT)	Charles (20)	Charles (10)	Canada (5)	Entertainment and Sports Arena; 4,200
Sunday, September 15	6:00 p.m.	Phoenix	@	Chicago	League Pass	93–88	Griner (26)	Griner (10)	Cloud (11)	Wintrust Arena; 8,577
Sunday, September 15	6:00 p.m.	Connecticut	@	Las Vegas	CBSSN; League Pass	71–84	Wilson (29)	Wilson (9)	Tied (7)	Michelob Ultra Arena; 10,431
Sunday, September 15	6:00 p.m.	Los Angeles	@	Seattle	USA: League Pass; Canada: NBA TV Canada	87–90	Hamby (25)	Hamby (11)	Diggins-Smith (6)	Climate Pledge Arena; 11,301
Tuesday, September 17	7:00 p.m.	Minnesota	@	Connecticut	USA: League Pass; Canada: TSN1/3/4	78–76	Collier (25)	Tied (8)	C. Williams (12)	Mohegan Sun Arena; 8,174
Tuesday, September 17	7:00 p.m.	New York	@	Washington	USA: NBA TV; League Pass; Canada: NBA TV Canada	87–71	Atkins (22)	Stewart (10)	Ionescu (7)	Entertainment and Sports Arena; 4,200
Tuesday, September 17	7:30 p.m.	Chicago	@	Atlanta	League Pass	70–86	Banham (22)	Charles (14)	Canada (5)	Gateway Center Arena; 3,335
Tuesday, September 17	10:00 p.m.	Phoenix	@	Los Angeles	CBSSN; League Pass	85–81	Hamby (21)	Yueru (12)	Cloud (12)	Crypto.com Arena; 11,294
Tuesday, September 17	10:00 p.m.	Las Vegas	@	Seattle	USA: NBA TV; League Pass; Canada: NBA TV Canada	85–72	Tied (21)	Tied (7)	Diggins-Smith (9)	Climate Pledge Arena; 14,298
Thursday, September 19	7:00 p.m.	Chicago	@	Connecticut	USA: League Pass; Canada: TSN3/5	54–87	Harris (15)	Carrington (12)	Thomas (7)	Mohegan Sun Arena; 8,902
Thursday, September 19	7:00 p.m.	Atlanta	@	New York	USA: NBA TV; League Pass; Canada: NBA TV Canada	78–67	Stewart (16)	Tied (10)	Ionescu (7)	Barclays Center; 12,721
Thursday, September 19	7:00 p.m.	Indiana	@	Washington	Prime Video	91–92	Koné (20)	Koné (7)	Clark (8)	Capital One Arena; 20,711
Thursday, September 19	8:00 p.m.	Los Angeles	@	Minnesota	League Pass	68–51	Hamby (20)	Tied (8)	Sims (9)	Target Center; 7,908
Thursday, September 19	10:00 p.m.	Dallas	@	Las Vegas	USA: League Pass; Canada: TSN3/5	84–98	S. Sabally (25)	K. Brown (9)	S. Sabally (7)	Michelob Ultra Arena; 10,376
Thursday, September 19	10:00 p.m.	Seattle	@	Phoenix	League Pass	89–70	Ogwumike (17)	Holmes (10)	Tied (6)	Footprint Center; 11,333

2024 WNBA playoffs
Round One

Date	Time (ET)	Matchup			TV	Result	High points	High rebounds	High assists	Location
Sunday, September 22	1:00 p.m.	Atlanta	@	New York	USA: ESPN; Canada: SN1	69–83	Fiebich (21)	Stewart (11)	Tied (5)	Barclays Center; 12,115
Sunday, September 22	3:00 p.m.	Indiana	@	Connecticut	USA: ABC; Canada: TSN2	69–93	Mabrey (27)	Boston (11)	Thomas (13)	Mohegan Sun Arena; 8,910
Sunday, September 22	5:00 p.m.	Phoenix	@	Minnesota	USA: ESPN; Canada: NBA TV Canada	95–102	Collier (38)	5 tied (6)	Cloud (10)	Target Center; 8,524
Sunday, September 22	10:00 p.m.	Seattle	@	Las Vegas	USA: ESPN; Canada: TSN2	67–78	Wilson (21)	Russell (12)	Diggins-Smith (8)	Michelob Ultra Arena; 10,369
Tuesday, September 24	7:30 p.m.	Atlanta	@	New York	USA: ESPN; Canada: TSN1	82–91	Ionescu (36)	J. Jones (13)	Canada (11)	Barclays Center; 11,003
Tuesday, September 24	9:30 p.m.	Seattle	@	Las Vegas	USA: ESPN; Canada: TSN1	76–83	Plum (29)	Wilson (13)	Diggins-Smith (10)	Michelob Ultra Arena; 10,370
Wednesday, September 25	7:30 p.m.	Indiana	@	Connecticut	USA: ESPN; Canada: TSN5	81–87	Clark (25)	Boston (19)	Thomas (13)	Mohegan Sun Arena; 8,910
Wednesday, September 25	9:30 p.m.	Phoenix	@	Minnesota	USA: ESPN; Canada: NBA TV Canada	88–101	Collier (42)	6 tied	Cloud (10)	Target Center; 8,769

Semifinals

Date	Time (ET)	Matchup			TV	Result	High points	High rebounds	High assists	Location
Sunday, September 29	3:00 p.m.	Las Vegas	@	New York	USA: ABC; Canada: NBA TV Canada	77–87	Stewart (34)	J. Jones (12)	Tied (5)	Barclays Center; 14,015
Sunday, September 29	7:30 p.m.	Connecticut	@	Minnesota	USA: ESPN; Canada: SN360	73–70	Mabrey (20)	Bonner (11)	Thomas (9)	Target Center; 8,506
Tuesday, October 1	7:30 p.m.	Las Vegas	@	New York	USA: ESPN2; Canada: TSN1/3/4	84–88	Tied (24)	J. Jones (8)	Stewart (8)	Barclays Center; 14,321
Tuesday, October 1	9:30 p.m.	Connecticut	@	Minnesota	USA: ESPN2; Canada: TSN1/3/4	70–74	Thomas (18)	Collier (12)	Thomas (7)	Target Center; 8,796
Friday, October 4	7:30 p.m.	Minnesota	@	Connecticut	USA: ESPN2; Canada: TSN2	90–81	Collier (26)	Collier (11)	C. Williams (8)	Mohegan Sun Arena; 8,268
Friday, October 4	9:30 p.m.	New York	@	Las Vegas	USA: ESPN2; Canada: TSN2	81–95	Young (24)	Wilson (14)	C. Gray (7)	Michelob Ultra Arena; 10,369
Sunday, October 6	3:00 p.m.	New York	@	Las Vegas	USA: ABC; Canada: SN360	76–62	Ionescu (22)	Stewart (14)	C. Gray (6)	Michelob Ultra Arena; 10,374
Sunday, October 6	5:00 p.m.	Minnesota	@	Connecticut	USA: ESPN; Canada: TSN4	82–92	Collier (29)	Collier (13)	Thomas (11)	Mohegan Sun Arena; 7,849
Tuesday, October 8	8:00 p.m.	Connecticut	@	Minnesota	USA: ESPN2; Canada: TSN3	77–88	Collier (27)	Carrington (12)	C. Williams (7)	Target Center; 8,769

Finals

Date	Time (ET)	Matchup			TV	Result	High points	High rebounds	High assists	Location
Thursday, October 10	8:00 p.m.	Minnesota	@	New York	USA: ESPN; Canada: TSN3	95–93 (OT)	J. Jones (24)	J. Jones (10)	C. Williams (5)	Barclays Center; 17,732
Sunday, October 13	3:00 p.m.	Minnesota	@	New York	USA: ABC; Canada: SN	66–80	Stewart (21)	J. Jones (9)	C. Williams (8)	Barclays Center; 18,046
Wednesday, October 16	8:00 p.m.	New York	@	Minnesota	USA: ESPN; Canada: TSN1/4 (TSN3 JIP at 9:00 p.m.)	80–77	Stewart (30)	Stewart (11)	C. Williams (8)	Target Center; 19,521
Friday, October 18	8:00 p.m.	New York	@	Minnesota	USA: ESPN; Canada: TSN2	80–82	J. Jones (21)	Stewart (11)	C. Williams (7)	Target Center; 19,210
Sunday, October 20	8:00 p.m.	Minnesota	@	New York	USA: ESPN; Canada: SN1	62–67 (OT)	Collier (22)	Stewart (15)	Ionescu (8)	Barclays Center; 18,090

Notes:

- Games highlighted in ██ represent Commissioner's Cup games.
- Game highlighted in ██ represents the WNBA 2024 Canada game.

=== Statistical leaders ===
The following shows the leaders in each statistical category during the 2024 regular season.

‡	New WNBA record

Category	Player	Team	Statistic
Points per game	A'ja Wilson	Las Vegas Aces	26.9 ppg ‡
Rebounds per game	Angel Reese	Chicago Sky	13.1 rpg ‡
Assists per game	Caitlin Clark	Indiana Fever	8.4 apg
Steals per game	Arike Ogunbowale	Dallas Wings	2.1 spg
Blocks per game	A'ja Wilson	Las Vegas Aces	2.6 bpg
Field goal percentage	Brittney Griner	Phoenix Mercury	57.9%
Three point FG percentage	Emily Engstler	Washington Mystics	47.4%
Free throw percentage	Arike Ogunbowale	Dallas Wings	92.1%
Points per game (team)		Las Vegas Aces	86.4 ppg
Field goal percentage (team)		Indiana Fever	45.6%

Through the end of the regular season

== Playoffs ==
**First round** Best-of-3
**1**	**New York Liberty**	**2**
8	Atlanta Dream	0
**4**	**Las Vegas Aces**	**2**
5	Seattle Storm	0
2	**Minnesota Lynx**	**2**
7	Phoenix Mercury	0
3	**Connecticut Sun**	**2**
6	Indiana Fever	0

**Semifinals**; Best-of-5
1	**New York Liberty**	**3**
4	Las Vegas Aces	1
2	**Minnesota Lynx**	**3**
3	Connecticut Sun	2

**Finals**; Best-of-5
1	**New York Liberty**	**3**
2	Minnesota Lynx	2

- **Bold** – Series winner
- Italic – Team with home-court-advantage

== Awards ==
=== Individual ===
Award		Winner	Team	Position	Votes/Statistic
Most Valuable Player (MVP)		A'ja Wilson	Las Vegas Aces	Forward	67 out of 67
Finals MVP		Jonquel Jones	New York Liberty	Forward/Guard	
Rookie of the Year		Caitlin Clark	Indiana Fever	Guard	66 out of 67
Most Improved Player		DiJonai Carrington	Connecticut Sun	Guard	28 out of 67
Defensive Player of the Year		Napheesa Collier	Minnesota Lynx	Forward	36 out of 67
Sixth Player of the Year		Tiffany Hayes	Las Vegas Aces	Guard	38 out of 67
Kim Perrot Sportsmanship Award		Dearica Hamby	Los Angeles Sparks	Forward	12 out of 67
Peak Performers	**Points**	A'ja Wilson	Las Vegas Aces	Forward	26.9 ppg
Peak Performers	**Rebounds**	Angel Reese	Chicago Sky	Forward	13.1 rpg
Peak Performers	**Assists**	Caitlin Clark	Indiana Fever	Guard	8.4 apg
Coach of the Year		Cheryl Reeve	Minnesota Lynx	Coach	62 out of 67
Basketball Executive of the Year		Cheryl Reeve	Minnesota Lynx	President of Basketball Operations	

=== Team ===
Award		Members				
**All-WNBA**	**First Team**	Napheesa Collier	A'ja Wilson	Breanna Stewart	Caitlin Clark	Alyssa Thomas
**All-WNBA**	**Second Team**	Sabrina Ionescu	Kahleah Copper	Nneka Ogwumike	Arike Ogunbowale	Jonquel Jones
**All-Defensive**	**First Team**	Napheesa Collier	A'ja Wilson	Ezi Magbegor	DiJonai Carrington	Breanna Stewart
**All-Defensive**	**Second Team**	Alyssa Thomas	Alanna Smith	Nneka Ogwumike	Jonquel Jones	Natasha Cloud
**All-Rookie Team**		Caitlin Clark	Rickea Jackson	Angel Reese	Kamilla Cardoso	Leonie Fiebich

=== Players of the Week ===
Date Awarded	Eastern Conference		Western Conference		Reference
Date Awarded	Player	Team	Player	Team	Reference
May 21	Alyssa Thomas	Connecticut Sun	Napheesa Collier	Minnesota Lynx	
May 28	DeWanna Bonner	Connecticut Sun	Kahleah Copper	Phoenix Mercury	
June 4	Sabrina Ionescu	New York Liberty	A'ja Wilson	Las Vegas Aces	
June 11	Breanna Stewart	New York Liberty	Dearica Hamby	Los Angeles Sparks	
June 18	Aliyah Boston	Indiana Fever	Brittney Griner	Phoenix Mercury	
June 25	Sabrina Ionescu (2)	New York Liberty	A'ja Wilson (4)	Las Vegas Aces	
July 9	Angel Reese	Chicago Sky	A'ja Wilson (4)	Las Vegas Aces	
July 18	Sabrina Ionescu (3)	New York Liberty	A'ja Wilson (4)	Las Vegas Aces	
August 27	Caitlin Clark (3)	Indiana Fever	Napheesa Collier (2)	Minnesota Lynx	
September 3	Caitlin Clark (3)	Indiana Fever	A'ja Wilson (5)	Las Vegas Aces	
September 10	Caitlin Clark (3)	Indiana Fever	Napheesa Collier (3)	Minnesota Lynx	
September 20	Breanna Stewart (2)	New York Liberty	A'ja Wilson (6)	Las Vegas Aces	

=== Players of the Month ===
Month	Eastern Conference		Western Conference		Reference
Month	Player	Team	Player	Team	Reference
May	Alyssa Thomas	Connecticut Sun	A'ja Wilson (3)	Las Vegas Aces	
June	Sabrina Ionescu (2)	New York Liberty	A'ja Wilson (3)	Las Vegas Aces	
July	Sabrina Ionescu (2)	New York Liberty	A'ja Wilson (3)	Las Vegas Aces	
August	Caitlin Clark (Note: Clark was the first rookie in WNBA history to earn the "Player of the Month" award.)	Indiana Fever	Napheesa Collier	Minnesota Lynx	
September	Breanna Stewart	New York Liberty	A'ja Wilson (4)	Las Vegas Aces	

=== Rookies of the Month ===
Month	Player	Team	Reference
May	Caitlin Clark	Indiana Fever	
June	Angel Reese	Chicago Sky	
July	Caitlin Clark (4)	Indiana Fever	
August	Caitlin Clark (4)	Indiana Fever	
September	Caitlin Clark (4)	Indiana Fever	

=== Coaches of the Month ===
Month	Coach	Team	Reference
May	Stephanie White	Connecticut Sun	
June	Cheryl Reeve	Minnesota Lynx	
July	Sandy Brondello	New York Liberty	
August	Christie Sides	Indiana Fever	
September	Becky Hammon	Las Vegas Aces	

== Coaches ==
=== Eastern Conference ===
Team	Head coach	Previous job	Years with team	Record with team	Playoff Appearances	Finals Appearances	WNBA Championships
Atlanta Dream	Tanisha Wright	Las Vegas Aces (assistant)	2	33–34	1	0	0
Chicago Sky	Teresa Weatherspoon	New Orleans Pelicans (assistant)	0	0–0	0	0	0
Connecticut Sun	Stephanie White	Vanderbilt	1	27–13	1	0	0
Indiana Fever	Christie Sides	Atlanta Dream (assistant)	1	13–27	0	0	0
New York Liberty	Sandy Brondello	Phoenix Mercury	2	48–28	2	1	0
Washington Mystics	Eric Thibault	Washington Mystics (associate head coach)	1	19–21	1	0	0

=== Western Conference ===
Team	Head coach	Previous job	Years with team	Record with team	Playoff Appearances	Finals Appearances	WNBA Championships
Dallas Wings	Latricia Trammell	Los Angeles Sparks (assistant)	1	22–18	1	0	0
Las Vegas Aces	Becky Hammon	San Antonio Spurs (assistant)	2	60–16	2	2	2
Los Angeles Sparks	Curt Miller	Connecticut Sun	1	17–23	0	0	0
Minnesota Lynx	Cheryl Reeve	Detroit Shock (assistant)	14	300–170	12	6	4
Phoenix Mercury	Nate Tibbetts	Orlando Magic (assistant)	0	0–0	0	0	0
Seattle Storm	Noelle Quinn	Seattle Storm (associate head coach)	3	49–53	2	0	0

Notes:

- Year with team does not include 2024 season.
- Records are from time at current team and are through the end of the 2023 regular season.
- Playoff appearances are from time at current team only.
- WNBA Finals and Championships do not include time with other teams.
- Coaches shown are the coaches who began the 2024 season as head coach of each team.

== Attendance ==
#	Team	Home games	Average attendance
1	Indiana Fever	20	17,036
2	New York Liberty	20	12,730
3	Las Vegas Aces	20	11,283
4	Seattle Storm	20	11,184
5	Los Angeles Sparks	20	11,045
6	Phoenix Mercury	20	10,715
7	Minnesota Lynx	20	9,292
8	Chicago Sky	20	8,757
9	Connecticut Sun	20	8,451
10	Washington Mystics	20	6,542
11	Dallas Wings	20	5,911
12	Atlanta Dream	20	4,744

== Media coverage ==
=== National ===
This was the eighth year of a nine-year deal with ESPN, the second year of a three-year deal with Ion, and the first year of a two-year deal with CBS Sports and Amazon. Select games also aired on NBA TV through the WNBA and NBA's shared ownership.

- ESPN aired 25 regular-season games across ABC, ESPN and ESPN2. Additionally, ESPN aired the 3-Point Contest and Skills Challenge, ABC aired the WNBA All-Star Game, and ABC, ESPN and ESPN2 exclusively aired the WNBA playoffs and WNBA Finals.
- Ion Television aired 47 regular-season games, exclusively on Friday nights. Select games were showcased nationally with others only shown to regional audiences. This was the first season Ion aired a weekly WNBA studio show.
- NBA TV aired 40 regular-season games.
- Amazon Prime Video streamed 20 regular-season games, 18 of which aired on Thursday nights. It also exclusively aired the championship game of the WNBA Commissioner's Cup.
- CBS Sports aired 20 regular-season games, with eight airing on CBS and 12 airing on CBS Sports Network.

During the league's Olympic break, the WNBA announced on July 24, 2024 that a new 11-year media rights extension was made with ESPN/ABC and Prime Video, as well as a new deal with NBC Sports. These new deals, which were announced in conjunction with the NBA's new media rights deal with the three parties, will take effect starting with the 2026 season.

=== Local ===
- In February 2024, the Atlanta Dream announced a new agreement with Gray Television to air games locally on WPCH-TV and Peachtree Sports Network.
- In March 2024, the New York Liberty announced a new agreement with Fox Television Stations to air games locally on WNYW or WWOR-TV.
- In April 2024, the Indiana Fever announced a new agreement with Tegna Inc. to air games locally on WTHR or WALV-CD.
