= Jacy Sheldon =

American basketball player (born 2000)

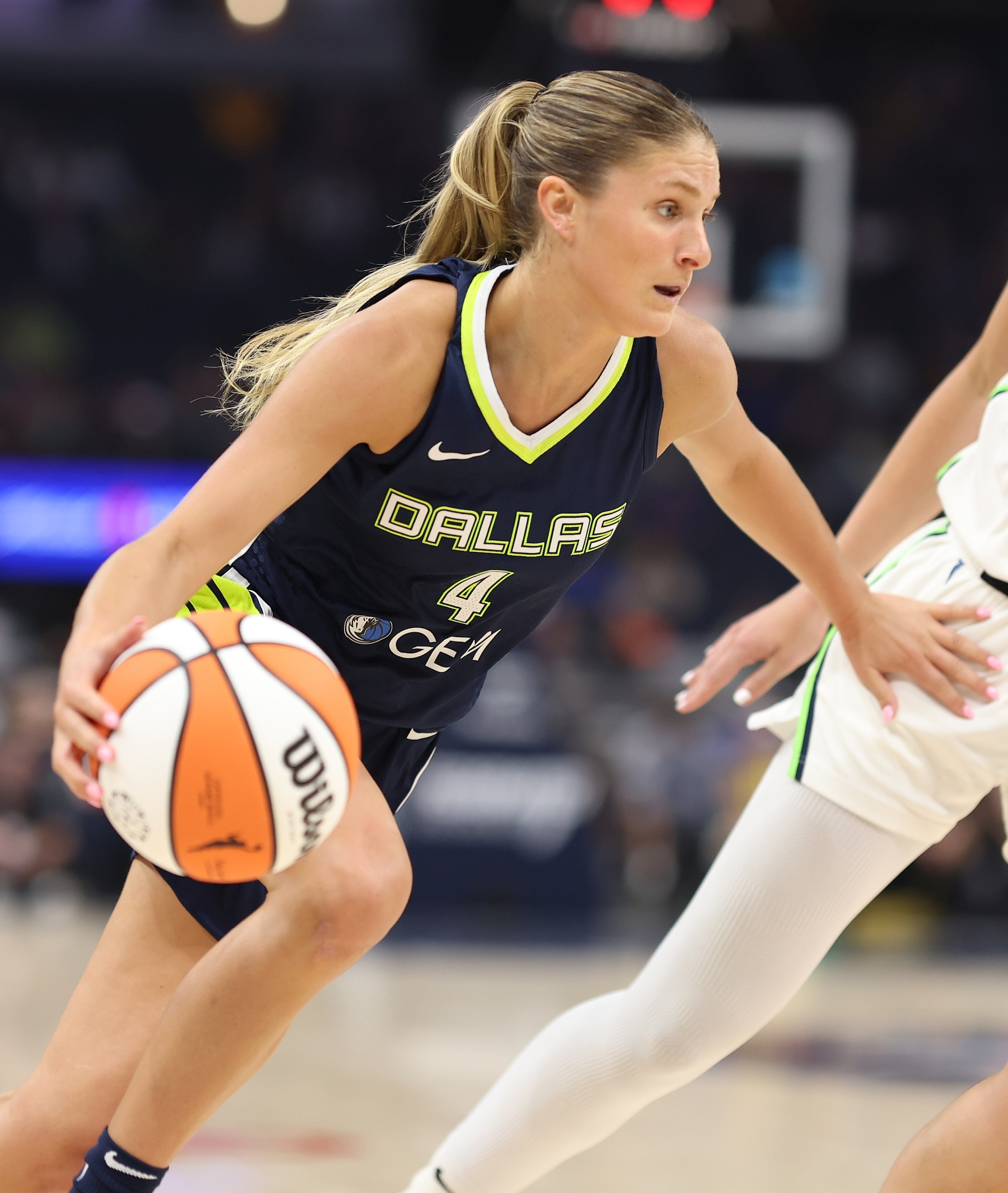
- Sheldon with the Dallas Wings in 2024

No. 0 – Chicago Sky
- Position: Shooting guard / point guard
- League: WNBA

Personal information
- Born: August 23, 2000 (age 26) Olmsted Falls, Ohio, U.S.
- Listed height: 5 ft 10 in (1.78 m)
- Listed weight: 140 lb (64 kg)

Career information
- High school: Dublin Coffman (Dublin, Ohio)
- College: Ohio State (2019–2024)
- WNBA draft: 2024: 1st round, 5th overall pick
- Drafted by: Dallas Wings
- Playing career: 2024–present

Career history
- 2024: Dallas Wings
- 2025: Connecticut Sun
- 2025: Washington Mystics
- 2026–present: Chicago Sky

Career highlights
- Second-team All-American – AP (2024); Second-team All-American – USBWA (2024); 2× First-team All-Big Ten (2022, 2024); Second-team All-Big Ten (2021); 2× Big Ten All-Defensive Team (2022, 2024)
- Stats at Basketball Reference

Jacy Rae Sheldon (born August 23, 2000) is an American professional basketball player for the Chicago Sky of the Women's National Basketball Association (WNBA) and Athletes Unlimited Pro Basketball. She played college basketball at Ohio State. She was selected fifth overall by the Dallas Wings in the 2024 WNBA draft. She also currently serves as the Director of Player Development at Ohio State.

== Early life ==
Sheldon played basketball for Dublin Coffman High School in Dublin, Ohio. Before her junior year, she suffered a concussion in a car accident and was unable to play basketball for several weeks. As a junior, she averaged 26.1 points, 6.3 rebounds, 6 assists and 5.2 steals per game, sharing Ohio Prep Sportswriters Association Division I Co-Player of the Year with Kierstan Bell. Sheldon scored a school-record 52 points against Eastmoor Academy, in her senior season. She averaged 28.3 points, 7.1 rebounds, 6.5 assists and 5.1 steals per game as a senior, earning state Division I Player of the Year honors from the Ohio High School Basketball Coaches Association. Sheldon left Coffman as the school's all-time leader in points, assists and steals. She was a three-time Columbus Dispatch All-Metro Player of the Year and Ohio Miss Basketball finalist in high school. In addition to basketball, she was an all-state volleyball player at Coffman.

Rated a five-star recruit by ESPN, Sheldon committed to playing college basketball for Ohio State after also considering Michigan State, Michigan and Indiana, among other programs. She was drawn to the school because she was a lifelong Ohio State fan and wanted to remain close to her younger sister, who has Down syndrome.

== College career ==
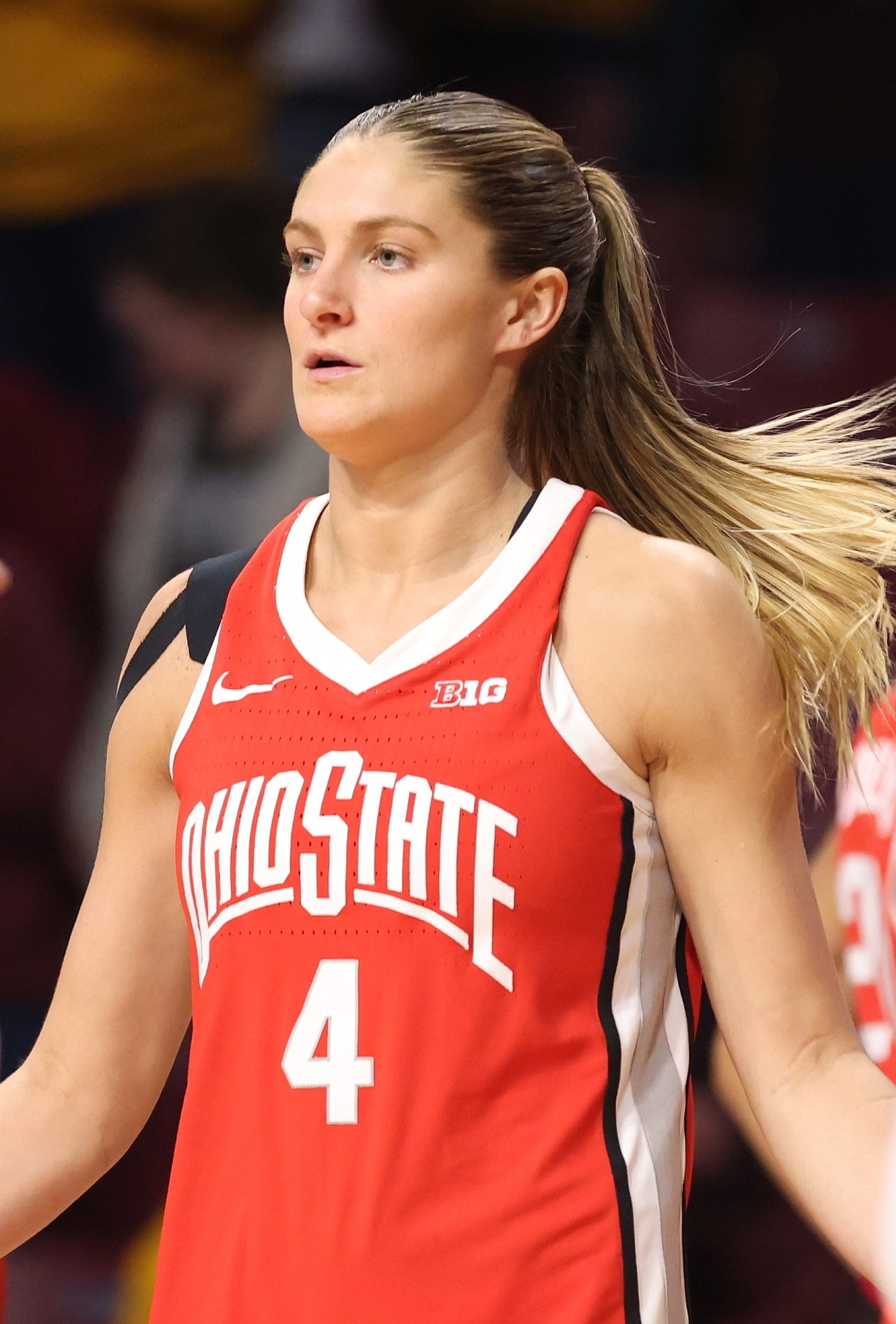
Sheldon with Ohio State in 2024

On December 17, 2019, Sheldon scored a freshman season-high 23 points in a 104–74 win over Sacramento State. As a freshman, she averaged 9.6 points per game. Sheldon scored a sophomore season-high 29 points in a 92–87 win against Iowa on February 4, 2021. She averaged 16.7 points, 3.7 rebounds and 2.6 assists per game as a sophomore, earning second-team All-Big Ten honors. On January 12, 2022, Sheldon recorded a career-high 33 points, six rebounds and six assists in an 89–83 win against Michigan State. As a junior, she averaged 19.7 points, 4.2 assists and 3.7 rebounds per game. She was named first-team All-Big Ten and made the coaches' All-Defensive Team. On November 13, Sheldon scored 14 points and tied the program single-game record with 11 steals in an 82–64 win over Boston College. She was sidelined for most of her senior season with a foot injury and averaged 13.2 points, 3.6 rebounds, 3.5 assists and 3.5 steals in 13 games. Despite being considered a potential first-round pick in the 2023 WNBA draft, Sheldon returned to Ohio State for a fifth season.

== Professional career ==
=== WNBA ===
==== Dallas Wings (2024) ====
On April 15, 2024, Sheldon was selected in the first round as the fifth overall pick of the 2024 WNBA draft by the Dallas Wings. On April 18, Sheldon was signed to the Wings' rookie scale contract. Sheldon made her WNBA regular season debut on May 15, in a home 87–79 win against the Chicago Sky. As the Wings struggled with injuries throughout the first half of the season, Sheldon's role gradually increased. On June 20, in an 83–72 loss to the Chicago Sky, Sheldon made her debut as a starter, recording 9 points and 3 assists. She remained a starter for the rest of the season, except for one game. Her best performance came on July 5 with a 85–82 win over the Atlanta Dream, when she had a career-high 17 points, including five three-pointers. Overall, in her rookie season, she played in all 40 regular-season games, started 26, and averaged 5.4 points and 2.5 assists in 23.3 minutes per game. Despite Sheldon's contributions, the Wings had a disappointing season, finishing 11th in the league and missing the playoffs.

==== Connecticut Sun (2025) ====
On February 2, 2025, Sheldon was traded to the Connecticut Sun. The deal was originally reported as Sheldon and the 8th pick in the 2025 WNBA draft being traded in exchange for DiJonai Carrington and the 12th overall pick in the 2025 draft; however, it was officially part of a larger four-team trade.

During a game against the Indiana Fever on June 17, Sheldon poked Fever Point guard Caitlin Clark in the eye while on defense. The two got into a shoving match that ended with Sun wing Marina Mabrey pushing Clark to the ground. During the game's final minute, Clark's teammate Sophie Cunningham grabbed her by the head and threw her out of bounds. The incident went viral.

==== Washington Mystics (2025) ====
On August 7, 2025, the Sun traded Sheldon and a first round pick swap to the Washington Mystics for Aaliyah Edwards. She played only two games in her new team.

==== Chicago Sky (2026) ====
On April 11, 2026, the Mystics traded Sheldon to the Chicago Sky in exchange for a 2028 draft pick.

=== WNBL ===
On July 16, 2024, it was announced that Sheldon had signed with the Townsville Fire for the upcoming WNBL season. However, on October 14, 2024, the team announced that Sheldon would not be joining the Fire.

=== Return to Ohio State ===
On November 12, 2024, Sheldon was announced as the Director of Player Development for Ohio State Buckeyes women's basketball. She will continue playing in the WNBA while serving in this role.

=== Athletes Unlimited ===
In September 2025, Sheldon joined Athletes Unlimited Pro Basketball for its fifth season in Nashville, adding to the league's roster after two seasons in the WNBA.

== Career statistics ==
Legend
GP	Games played	GS	Games started	MPG	Minutes per game	RPG	Rebounds per game
APG	Assists per game	SPG	Steals per game	BPG	Blocks per game	PPG	Points per game
TO	Turnovers per game	FG%	Field-goal percentage	3P%	3-point field-goal percentage	FT%	Free-throw percentage
**Bold**	Career best	°	League leader

=== WNBA ===
Stats current through end of 2025 season

WNBA regular season statistics
Year	Team	GP	GS	MPG	FG%	3P%	FT%	RPG	APG	SPG	BPG	TO	PPG
2024	Dallas	**40**	**26**	23.3	.386	.309	.926	**2.1**	**2.5**	0.6	**0.3**	1.6	5.4
2025	Connecticut	28	17	**24.1**	**.470**	**.412**	**.900**	1.9	2.0	**1.0**	0.2	1.1	**7.5**
2025	Washington	2	0	16.0	.400	.167	.800	1.5	0.5	0.0	0.0	**0.5**	6.5
2026	Chicago	44	18	20.6	.425	.300	.857	1.4	1.8	0.8	0.3	1.0	6.4
**Career**	3 years, 4 teams	114	61	22.3	.424	.331	.881	1.8	2.0	0.8	0.3	1.2	6.3

=== College ===
NCAA statistics
Year	Team	GP	GS	MPG	FG%	3P%	FT%	RPG	APG	SPG	BPG	TO	PPG
2019–20	Ohio State	**33**	24	27.4	48.3	34.6	79.6	2.8	1.5	1.4	0.1	**1.4**	9.6
2020–21	Ohio State	20	20	32.1	48.6	34.4	82.4	3.7	2.6	1.8	**0.3**	2.2	16.7
2021–22	Ohio State	32	**32**	**33.9**	50.4	36.6	86.4	**3.7**	**4.2**	1.9	**0.3**	3.1	**19.7**
2022–23	Ohio State	13	10	28.6	43.2	23.7	**87.8**	3.6	3.5	**3.5**	0.2	2.5	13.2
2023–24	Ohio State	32	**32**	33.6	**50.5**	**37.3**	85.8	3.2	3.8	1.9	0.2	2.3	17.8
**Career**		130	118	31.4	49.1	35.0	85.0	3.3	3.1	1.9	0.2	2.3	15.6

== Off the court ==
=== Personal life ===
Sheldon's father, Duane, played college basketball for Baldwin Wallace before embarking on a coaching career and later becoming the athletic director at Dublin Coffman High School. Her mother, Laura, competed on the track and field team at Baldwin Wallace. Sheldon has a younger brother, Ajay, who plays basketball for Ohio, and a younger sister, Emmy.

=== Endorsements ===
In August 2024, Sheldon signed a signature shoe deal with HOLO Footwear, which also gave her an equity stake in the company. Her first signature shoe, the JS:01, was revealed in February 2025. The JS:01 sneaker was made available to the general public on July 18, 2025.
