= 2024 Dallas Wings season =

- Head coach: Latricia Trammell
- Arena: College Park Center

Results
- Record: 9–31 (.225)
- Place: 5th (Western)
- Playoff finish: Did not qualify

The 2024 Dallas Wings season is the franchise's 27th season in the Women's National Basketball Association and the 9th season for the franchise in Dallas - after relocating from Tulsa and Detroit. This is the second season under head coach Latricia Trammell. The regular season tipped off on May 15, 2024, at home versus the Chicago Sky.

The Wings started the season by splitting the opening two games with Chicago. They would go on to lose at Atlanta before winning the next two games of their road trip. They would close the month with a two-point road loss to Connecticut to finish the month with a 3–3 record. June would prove a much more trying month for the Wings. The loss to end May turned into an eleven-game losing streak. On June 9, they did force overtime versus Phoenix, but ended up losing the game by seven points. None of the games during the June portion of the losing streak were within five points. They finally broke the streak on June 27 at home versus the Minnesota Lynx. They lost the last game of the month to finish with an 1–11 record. They started July with two losses but achieved a three-point win at home versus Atlanta to prevent a new streak from building. They would lose their next three games before ending the month with a win versus Indiana. They finished the month 2–5 and went into the Olympic break with a 6–19 record. Satou Sabally returned from the break healthy, but it was not enough as the Wings lost their first three games back from the break. However, they eventually gelled, winning their last three games of the month. The highlight was an eighteen point win over Minnesota on the final day of the month. The three-game winning streak would be their last wins of the season, as the Wings lost all nine games in September. They did force overtime versus Atlanta on September 6 and only lost to Seattle on September 13 by two points. The Wings finished with a 9–31 record, one game above Los Angeles to prevent finishing in last place. Their .225 winning percentage was their worst since 2011, when the franchise was located in Tulsa.

== Transactions ==
=== WNBA draft ===
Round	Pick	Player	Nationality	School/Team/Country
1	5	Jacy Sheldon	United States	Ohio State
1	9	Carla Leite	France	Tarbes Gespe Bigorre (France)
3	33	Ashley Owusu	United States	Penn State

=== Transactions ===
Date	Transaction
January 11, 2024	Extended a Qualifying Offer to Satou Sabally
January 22, 2024	Suspended the contract of Awak Kuier for the 2024 season
February 1, 2024	Re-signed Kalani Brown
February 1, 2024	Re-signed Satou Sabally
February 6, 2024	Signed Stephanie Soares
February 12, 2024	Signed Emma Cannon
February 18, 2024	Renounced the rights to Kitija Laksa
February 20, 2024	Signed Jaelyn Brown and Katrina Pardee to Training Camp Contracts
February 23, 2024	Signed Sevgi Uzun to Training Camp Contract
April 18, 2024	Signed Jacy Sheldon and Ashley Owusu to Rookie Contracts
May 4, 2024	Traded Crystal Dangerfield to the Atlanta Dream in exchange for a 2025 3rd Round Pick
May 4, 2024	Waived Emma Cannon
May 5, 2024	Waived Ashley Owusu
May 9, 2024	Waived Katrina Pardee
May 12, 2024	Waived Veronica Burton
May 17, 2024	Signed Monique Billings to a hardship contract
June 19, 2024	Signed Morgan Bertsch to a hardship contract
June 25, 2024	Released Morgan Bertsch, and signed Odyssey Sims to a hardship contract
August 14, 2024	Released Monique Billings and Odyssey Sims from hardship contracts

=== Roster changes ===
==== Additions ====
Personnel	Signed/Trade	Former team
Morgan Bertsch	Signed (hardship contract)	Phoenix Mercury
Emma Cannon	Signed	Indiana Fever
Ashley Owusu	Draft	Penn State
Lou Lopez Sénéchal	Return from injury	—
Jacy Sheldon	Draft	Ohio State
Odyssey Sims	Signed (hardship contract)	–
Stephanie Soares	Return from injury	—
Sevgi Uzun	Signed	Free Agent

==== Subtractions ====
Personnel	Reason	New team
Morgan Bertsch	Released	—
Veronica Burton	Waived	Connecticut Sun
Emma Cannon	Waived	Las Vegas Aces
Diamond DeShields	Free Agency	Chicago Sky
Crystal Dangerfield	Trade	Atlanta Dream
Awak Kuier	Contract Suspended	—
Ashley Owusu	Waived	–

== Roster ==
2024 Dallas Wings roster
Players
Coaches

Pos.	No.	Nat.	Name	Height	Weight	DOB	From	Yrs
C	21	(United States)	Brown, Kalani	6' 7" (2.01m)	245 lb (111kg)	1997-03-21	Baylor	4
G/F	18	(United States)	Brown, Jaelyn	6' 1" (1.85m)	170 lb (77kg)	1998-10-12	California	R
F	6	(United States)	Howard, Natasha	6' 2" (1.88m)	165 lb (75kg)	1991-09-02	Florida State	10
F/C	28	(Finland)	Kuier, Awak (S)	6' 4" (1.93m)	168 lb (76kg)	2001-08-19	Finland	2
G	8	(Mexico)	Lopez Sénéchal, Lou	6' 1" (1.85m)	155 lb (70kg)	1998-05-12	Connecticut	R
C	15	(United States)	McCowan, Teaira	6' 7" (2.01m)	239 lb (108kg)	1996-09-28	Mississippi State	5
G	24	(United States)	Ogunbowale, Arike	5' 8" (1.73m)	165 lb (75kg)	1997-03-02	Notre Dame	5
F	0	(Germany)	Sabally, Satou	6' 4" (1.93m)	175 lb (79kg)	1998-04-25	Oregon	4
G	4	(United States)	Sheldon, Jacy	5' 10" (1.78m)	140 lb (64kg)	2000-08-23	Ohio State	R
F	20	(United States)	Siegrist, Maddy	6' 2" (1.88m)	175 lb (79kg)	2000-05-22	Villanova	1
C	10	(Brazil)	Soares, Stephanie (injured)	6' 6" (1.98m)	196 lb (89kg)	2000-04-17	Iowa State	R
G	1	(Turkey)	Uzun, Sevgi	5' 10" (1.78m)	141 lb (64kg)	1997-11-25	Turkey	R
G	–	(France)	Leite, Carla (DP)	5' 9" (1.75m)		2004-04-16	France	–
G	–	(United States)	Robinson, Paige (DP)	5' 11" (1.8m)		2000-07-24	Illinois State	–

Head coach
(United States) Latricia Trammell (East Central)
Assistant coaches
(United States) Brandi Poole (Sewanee)
(United States) Courtney Paris (Oklahoma)
(United States) Zak Buncik (UT Arlington)
Athletic trainer
(United States) Branay Hicks (UT Tyler)

Legend

- (C) Team captain
- (DP) Unsigned draft pick
- (FA) Free agent
- (S) Suspended
- Injured

=== Depth ===
Pos.	Starter	Bench
PG	Sevgi Uzun
SG	Jacy Sheldon	Lou Lopez Sénéchal; Jaelyn Brown
SF	Arike Ogunbowale	Satou Sabally; Maddy Siegrist; Stephanie Soares
PF	Natasha Howard
C	Teaira McCowan	Kalani Brown

== Schedule ==
=== Pre-season ===
2024 pre-season game log
Total: 1–0 (Home: 1–0; Road: 0–0)
May: 1–0 (Home: 1–0; Road: 0–0)

Game	Date	Team	Score	High points	High rebounds	High assists	Location Attendance	Record
1	May 3	Indiana	W 76–79	Jaelyn Brown (21)	Teaira McCowan (10)	Howard; Ogunbowale; Uzun (3)	College Park Center; 6,251	1–0

2024 pre-season schedule

=== Regular season ===
2024 game log
Total: 9–31 (Home: 7–13; Road: 2–18)
May: 3–3 (Home: 1–1; Road: 2–2)

Game	Date	Team	Score	High points	High rebounds	High assists	Location Attendance	Record
1	May 15	Chicago	W 87–79	Arike Ogunbowale (25)	Howard; McCowan (13)	Arike Ogunbowale (7)	College Park Center; 6,251	1–0
2	May 18	Chicago	L 74–83	Arike Ogunbowale (35)	Brown; Soares (9)	Sevgi Uzun (6)	College Park Center; 6,251	1–1
3	May 21	@ Atlanta	L 78–83	Arike Ogunbowale (24)	Teaira McCowan (14)	Sevgi Uzun (8)	Gateway Center Arena; 3,265	1–2
4	May 25	@ Phoenix	W 107–92	Arike Ogunbowale (40)	Maddy Siegrist (9)	Teaira McCowan (5)	Footprint Center; 8,339	2–2
5	May 26	@ Los Angeles	W 84–83	Arike Ogunbowale (20)	Monique Billings (12)	Sevgi Uzun (8)	Crypto.com Arena; 10,340	3–2
6	May 31	@ Connecticut	L 72–74	Arike Ogunbowale (21)	Teaira McCowan (7)	Arike Ogunbowale (7)	Mohegan Sun Arena; 7,638	3–3

June : 1–11 (Home: 1–4; Road: 0–7)

Game	Date	Team	Score	High points	High rebounds	High assists	Location Attendance	Record
7	June 2	@ Minnesota	L 76–87	Arike Ogunbowale (21)	Monique Billings (15)	Arike Ogunbowale (6)	Target Center; 7,024	3–4
8	June 5	Las Vegas	L 81–95	Arike Ogunbowale (31)	Teaira McCowan (15)	Arike Ogunbowale (7)	College Park Center; 6,251	3–5
9	June 7	@ Los Angeles	L 72–81	Arike Ogunbowale (22)	Monique Billings (12)	Arike Ogunbowale (4)	Crypto.com Arena; 10,123	3–6
10	June 9	Phoenix	L 90–97 (OT)	Arike Ogunbowale (25)	Monique Billings (11)	Arike Ogunbowale (10)	College Park Center; 5,568	3–7
11	June 13	Seattle	L 84–92	Arike Ogunbowale (24)	Teaira McCowan (10)	Ogunbowale, Uzun (5)	College Park Center; 5,568	3–8
12	June 15	Connecticut	L 67–85	McCowan, Siegrist (16)	Teaira McCowan (10)	Arike Ogunbowale (5)	College Park Center; 5,977	3–9
13	June 17	@ Minnesota	L 78–90	Siegrist, Uzun (17)	Monique Billings (10)	Monique Billings (9)	Target Center; 8,314	3–10
14	June 20	@ Chicago	L 72–83	Arike Ogunbowale (31)	Monique Billings (9)	Sevgi Uzun (6)	Wintrust Arena; 9,025	3–11
15	June 22	@ Washington	L 69–97	Natasha Howard (19)	Arike Ogunbowale (7)	Sevgi Uzun (5)	Entertainment and Sports Arena; 4,200	3–12
16	June 23	@ Washington	L 84–92	Natasha Howard (26)	Monique Billings (14)	Sevgi Uzun (7)	Entertainment and Sports Arena; 4,200	3-13
17	June 27	Minnesota	W 94–88	Arike Ogunbowale (23)	Teaira McCowan (12)	Arike Ogunbowale (9)	College Park Center; 6,251	4–13
18	June 29	@ Seattle	L 76–97	Arike Ogunbowale (24)	Natasha Howard (7)	Natasha Howard (5)	Climate Pledge Arena; 9,080	4–14

July : 2–5 (Home: 2–2; Road: 0–3)

Game	Date	Team	Score	High points	High rebounds	High assists	Location Attendance	Record
19	July 1	@ Seattle	L 71–95	Arike Ogunbowale (21)	Howard, Ogunbowale (6)	Odyssey Sims (6)	Climate Pledge Arena; 7,202	4–15
20	July 3	Phoenix	L 96–104	Natasha Howard (36)	Natasha Howard (11)	Odyssey Sims (6)	College Park Center; 6,129	4–16
21	July 5	Atlanta	W 85–82	Arike Ogunbowale (19)	Teaira McCowan (11)	Odyssey Sims (7)	College Park Center; 5,872	5–16
22	July 7	@ Las Vegas	L 85–104	Odyssey Sims (25)	Natasha Howard (8)	Odyssey Sims (5)	Michelob Ultra Arena; 10,369	5–17
23	July 10	@ Phoenix	L 84–100	Howard, Sims (19)	Teaira McCowan (10)	Arike Ogunbowale (13)	Footprint Center; 11,601	5–18
24	July 13	Los Angeles	L 81–87	Odyssey Sims (23)	Natasha Howard (7)	Odyssey Sims (5)	College Park Center; 6,251	5–19
25	July 17	Indiana	W 101–93	Ogunbowale, Sims (24)	Howard, Ogunbowale (7)	Odyssey Sims (9)	College Park Center; 6,251	6–19

August : 3–3 (Home: 3–1; Road: 0–2)

Game	Date	Team	Score	High points	High rebounds	High assists	Location Attendance	Record
26	August 16	Connecticut	L 91–109	Arike Ogunbowale (21)	Natasha Howard (11)	Satou Sabally (7)	College Park Center; 6,191	6–20
27	August 20	@ New York	L 74–94	Satou Sabally (24)	Natasha Howard (9)	Jacy Sheldon (7)	Barclays Center; 11,455	6–21
28	August 22	@ New York	L 71–79	Arike Ogunbowale (19)	Howard, McCowan (8)	Arike Ogunbowale (8)	Barclays Center; 10,986	6–22
29	August 25	Los Angeles	W 113–110	Arike Ogunbowale (33)	Teaira McCowan (11)	Jacy Sheldon (8)	College Park Center; 5,925	7–22
30	August 27	Las Vegas	W 93–90	Satou Sabally (28)	Teaira McCowan (17)	Arike Ogunbowale (6)	College Park Center; 6,251	8–22
31	August 30	Minnesota	W 94–76	Arike Ogunbowale (25)	Teaira McCowan (11)	Arike Ogunbowale (8)	College Park Center; 5,581	9–22

September : 0–9 (Home: 0–5; Road: 0–4)

Game	Date	Team	Score	High points	High rebounds	High assists	Location Attendance	Record
32	September 1	Indiana	L 93–100	Arike Ogunbowale (34)	Teaira McCowan (11)	Natasha Howard (9)	College Park Center; 6,251	9–23
33	September 3	Washington	L 86–90	Arike Ogunbowale (21)	Teaira McCowan (13)	Sabally, Uzun (5)	College Park Center; 5,129	9–24
34	September 6	@ Atlanta	L 96–107 (OT)	Natasha Howard (24)	Teaira McCowan (11)	Arike Ogunbowale (8)	Gateway Center Arena; 3,260	9–25
35	September 8	@ Chicago	L 77–92	Arike Ogunbowale (23)	Kalani Brown (8)	Satou Sabally (7)	Wintrust Arena; 8,704	9–26
36	September 10	New York	L 91–105	Arike Ogunbowale (23)	Sabally, Siegrist (7)	Satou Sabally (7)	College Park Center; 5,157	9–27
37	September 12	New York	L 67–99	Ogunbowale, Siegrist (11)	Teaira McCowan (9)	Sevgi Uzun (5)	College Park Center; 5,384	9–28
38	September 13	Seattle	L 81–83	Teaira McCowan (23)	Teaira McCowan (15)	Satou Sabally (6)	College Park Center; 5,728	9–29
39	September 15	@ Indiana	L 109–110	Ogunbowale, Sabally (27)	Natasha Howard (10)	Sabally, Sheldon (6)	Gainbridge Fieldhouse; 17,274	9–30
40	September 19	@ Las Vegas	L 84–98	Satou Sabally (25)	Kalani Brown (9)	Satou Sabally (7)	Michelob Ultra Arena; 10,376	9–31

2024 season schedule

== Standings ==
#	Team	W	L	PCT	GB	Conf.	Home	Road	Cup
1	yx – New York Liberty	32	8	.800	—	16–4	16–4	16–4	5–0
2	cx – Minnesota Lynx	30	10	.750	2	14–6	16–4	14–6	4–1
3	x – Connecticut Sun	28	12	.700	4	14–6	14–6	14–6	4–1
4	x – Las Vegas Aces	27	13	.675	5	12–8	13–7	14–6	2–3
5	x – Seattle Storm	25	15	.625	7	13–7	14–6	11–9	4–1
6	x – Indiana Fever	20	20	.500	12	11–9	12–8	8–12	3–2
7	x – Phoenix Mercury	19	21	.475	13	10–10	10–10	9–11	3–2
8	x – Atlanta Dream	15	25	.375	17	7–13	8–12	7–13	1–4
9	e – Washington Mystics	14	26	.350	18	7–13	5–15	9–11	1–4
10	e – Chicago Sky	13	27	.325	19	5–15	6–14	7–13	1–4
11	e – Dallas Wings	9	31	.225	23	6–14	7–13	2–18	0–5
12	e – Los Angeles Sparks	8	32	.200	24	5–15	5–15	3–17	2–3

Notes

(#) – League Standing
c – Commissioner's Cup winners
y – Regular Season Champion
x – Clinched playoff berth
e – Eliminated from playoff contention
Source: Overall standings and Commissioner's Cup Standings

== Statistics ==
Legend
GP	Games played	GS	Games started	MPG	Minutes per game	RPG	Rebounds per game
APG	Assists per game	SPG	Steals per game	BPG	Blocks per game	PPG	Points per game
FG%	Field-goal percentage	3P%	3-point field-goal percentage	FT%	Free-throw percentage	TO	Turnovers per game
PF	Fouls per game		Team leader		League leader

=== Regular season ===
Player	GP	GS	MPG	FG%	3P%	FT%	RPG	APG	SPG	BPG	TO	PF	PPG
Arike Ogunbowale	38	38	38.6	.383	.346	.921	4.6	5.1	2.1	0.3	2.7	2.8	22.2
Satou Sabally	15	15	34.1	.426	.452	.779	6.4	5.0	1.3	0.5	2.5	3.2	17.9
Natasha Howard	27	26	30.6	.456	.200	.718	6.7	2.9	1.3	0.8	2.8	3.1	17.6
Odyssey Sims^{≠} ^{‡}	9	7	33.9	.535	.500	.654	2.9	5.6	1.7	0.4	1.8	1.7	17.2
Teaira McCowan	39	38	25.3	.570	.250	.718	8.1	1.6	0.9	0.9	2.0	3.0	11.7
Maddy Siegrist	27	13	23.9	.505	.270	.767	3.3	1.0	0.4	0.4	0.6	1.2	9.4
Monique Billings ^{≠} ^{‡}	24	12	25.4	.475	.143	.804	6.6	1.9	0.6	0.5	2.1	2.5	8.8
Kalani Brown	38	2	13.5	.582	.000	.661	3.1	1.1	0.2	0.6	1.2	1.7	5.9
Jacy Sheldon	40	26	23.3	.386	.309	.926	2.1	2.5	0.6	0.3	1.6	2.5	5.4
Sevgi Uzun	40	19	20.5	.342	.238	.826	1.6	3.0	0.9	0.3	1.8	1.5	4.4
Jaelyn Brown	14	1	10.1	.484	.500	.333	1.5	0.4	0.3	0.3	0.9	1.1	2.6
Stephanie Soares	22	3	8.0	.294	.167	1.000	2.1	0.5	0.1	0.4	0.5	0.8	1.1
Lou Lopez Sénéchal	27	0	4.6	.294	.200	.500	0.4	0.4	0.1	0.0	0.2	0.5	0.9
Morgan Bertsch ^{≠} ^{‡}	3	0	7.3	.000	.000	.500	1.7	0.0	0.3	0.0	1.3	1.3	0.3

^{‡}Waived/Released during the season
^{†}Traded during the season
^{≠}Acquired during the season

== Awards and honors ==
Recipient	Award	Date awarded	Ref.
Arike Ogunbowale	WNBA All-Star	July 2, 2024	
Arike Ogunbowale	All-Star Game MVP	July 20, 2024	
Arike Ogunbowale	AP All-WNBA Second Team	September 22, 2024	
Arike Ogunbowale	All-WNBA Second Team	October 16, 2024	
