= 2024 WNBA draft =

Basketball player selection

2024 WNBA Draft
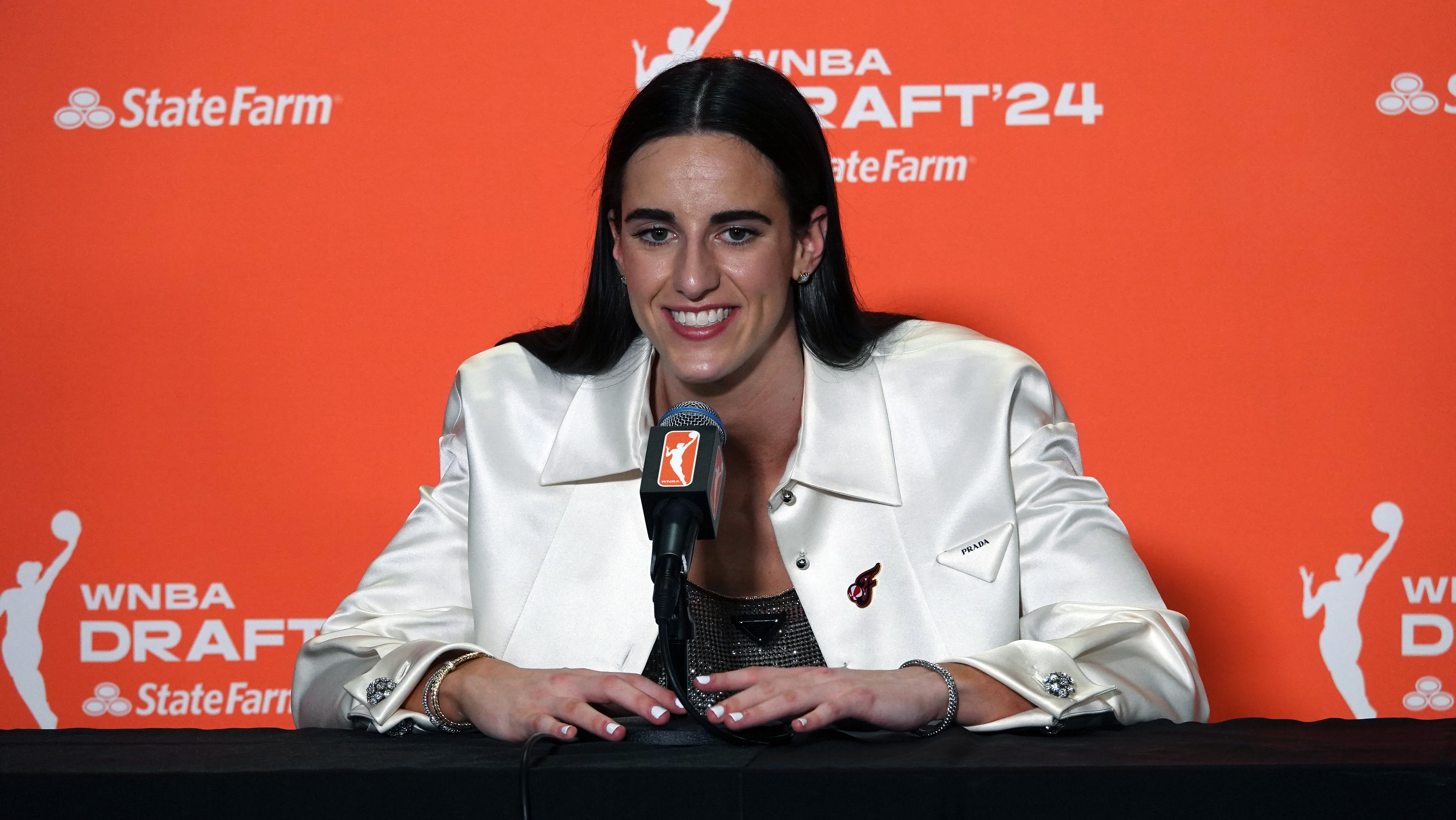
- Caitlin Clark answering press conference questions shortly after being selected first overall

General information
- Sport: Basketball
- Date: April 15, 2024
- Location: Brooklyn Academy of Music; Brooklyn, New York
- Networks: United States: ESPN; Canada: TSN1/3/4 (Note: TSN3 joined in progress at 9:00 p.m. EDT.)

Overview
- League: WNBA
- Teams: 12
- First selection: Caitlin Clark, Indiana Fever

The Women's National Basketball Association (WNBA)'s draft for the 2024 season, following the 2023–24 NCAA Division I women's basketball season, was held on April 15, 2024, the 29th draft in WNBA history. The draft took place at the Brooklyn Academy of Music in Brooklyn, New York, and allowed fans to be in attendance for the first time since the 2016 WNBA draft. It was exclusively televised on ESPN in the United States and on TSN1/3/4 in Canada at 7:30 p.m. EDT.

== Draft lottery ==
The lottery selection to determine the order of the top four picks in the 2024 draft took place on December 10, 2023, and was televised on ESPN in the U.S. and on TSN5 in Canada. The four non-playoff teams in 2023 qualified for the lottery drawing: the Indiana Fever, Phoenix Mercury, Los Angeles Sparks, and Seattle Storm. The Fever won the lottery for the second time in franchise history and were awarded the top pick in the draft. The rest of the order went as follows: Sparks, Mercury, Storm.

=== Lottery chances ===
Note: Team selected for No.1 pick noted in bold text

Team	Combined 2022–23 record	Lottery chances	Result
**Indiana Fever**	**18–58**	**44.2%**	**1st pick**
Phoenix Mercury	24–52	27.6%	3rd pick
Los Angeles Sparks	30–46	17.8%	2nd pick
Seattle Storm	33–43	10.4%	4th pick

The lottery odds were based on combined records from the 2022 and 2023 WNBA seasons. In the drawing, 14 balls numbered 1–14 are placed in a lottery machine and mixed. Four balls are drawn to determine a four-digit combination (only 11–12–13–14 is ignored and redrawn). The team to which that four-ball combination is assigned receives the No. 1 pick. The four balls are then placed back into the machine, and the process is repeated to determine the second pick. The two teams whose numerical combinations do not come up in the lottery will select in the inverse order of their two-year cumulative record. Ernst & Young knows the discreet results before they are announced. The order of selection for the remainder of the first round, as well as the second and third rounds, was determined by inverse order of the teams' respective regular-season records solely from 2023.

== Eligibility ==
Under the collective bargaining agreement (CBA) between the WNBA and its players' union, draft eligibility for players not defined as "international" requires the following to be true:

- The player's 22nd birthday falls during the calendar year of the draft. For this draft, the cutoff birth date was December 31, 2002.
- She has either:
  - completed her college eligibility;
  - received a bachelor's degree, or is scheduled to receive such in the three months following the draft; or
  - is at least four years removed from high school graduation.

A player who is scheduled to receive her bachelor's degree within three months of the draft date, and is younger than the cutoff age, is only eligible if the calendar year of the draft is no earlier than the fourth after her high school graduation.

Players with remaining college eligibility who meet the cutoff age must notify the WNBA headquarters of their intent to enter the draft no later than 10 days before the draft date, and must renounce any remaining college eligibility to do so. A separate notification timetable is provided for players involved in postseason tournaments (most notably the NCAA Division I tournament); those players (normally) must declare for the draft within 24 hours of their final game.

"International players" are defined as those for whom all of the following is true:

- Born and currently residing outside the U.S.
- Never "exercised intercollegiate basketball eligibility" in the U.S.

For "international players", the eligibility age is 20, also measured on December 31 of the year of the draft.

== Draft invitees ==
On April 11, 2024, the WNBA released the names of the players who would be invited to be in attendance at the draft. This included:

- (United States) Cameron Brink, Stanford
- (Brazil) Kamilla Cardoso, South Carolina
- (United States) Caitlin Clark, Iowa
- (United States) Marquesha Davis, Ole Miss
- (Canada) Aaliyah Edwards, UConn
- (United States) Dyaisha Fair, Syracuse
- (United States) Rickea Jackson, Tennessee
- (United States) Elizabeth Kitley, Virginia Tech
- (Croatia) Nika Mühl, UConn
- (United States) Charisma Osborne, UCLA
- (United States) Alissa Pili, Utah
- Nyadiew Puoch, Southside Flyers (Australia)
- (United States) Angel Reese, LSU
- (United States) Jacy Sheldon, Ohio State
- (United States) Celeste Taylor, Ohio State

== Draft ==
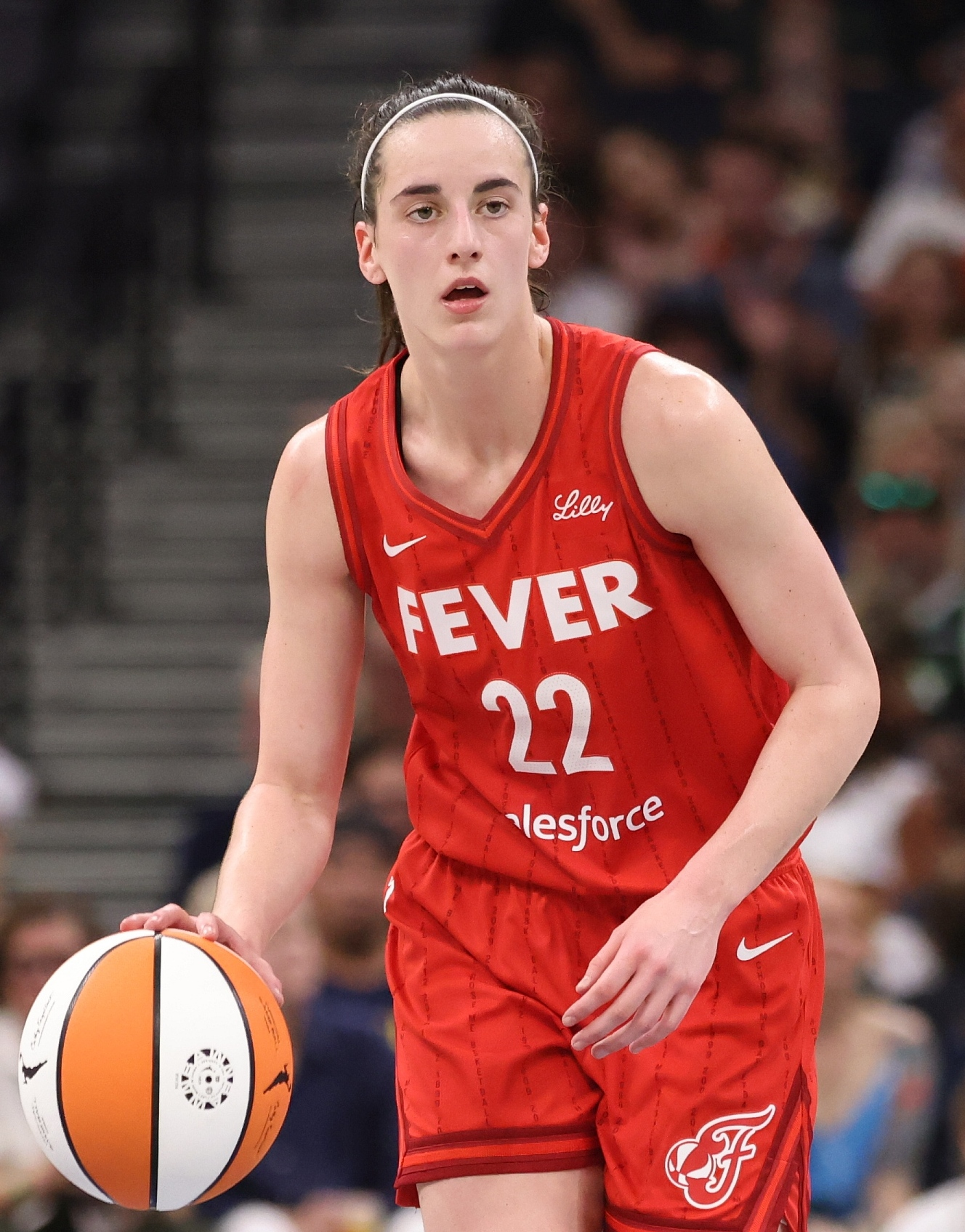
Caitlin Clark was selected 1st overall by the Indiana Fever.

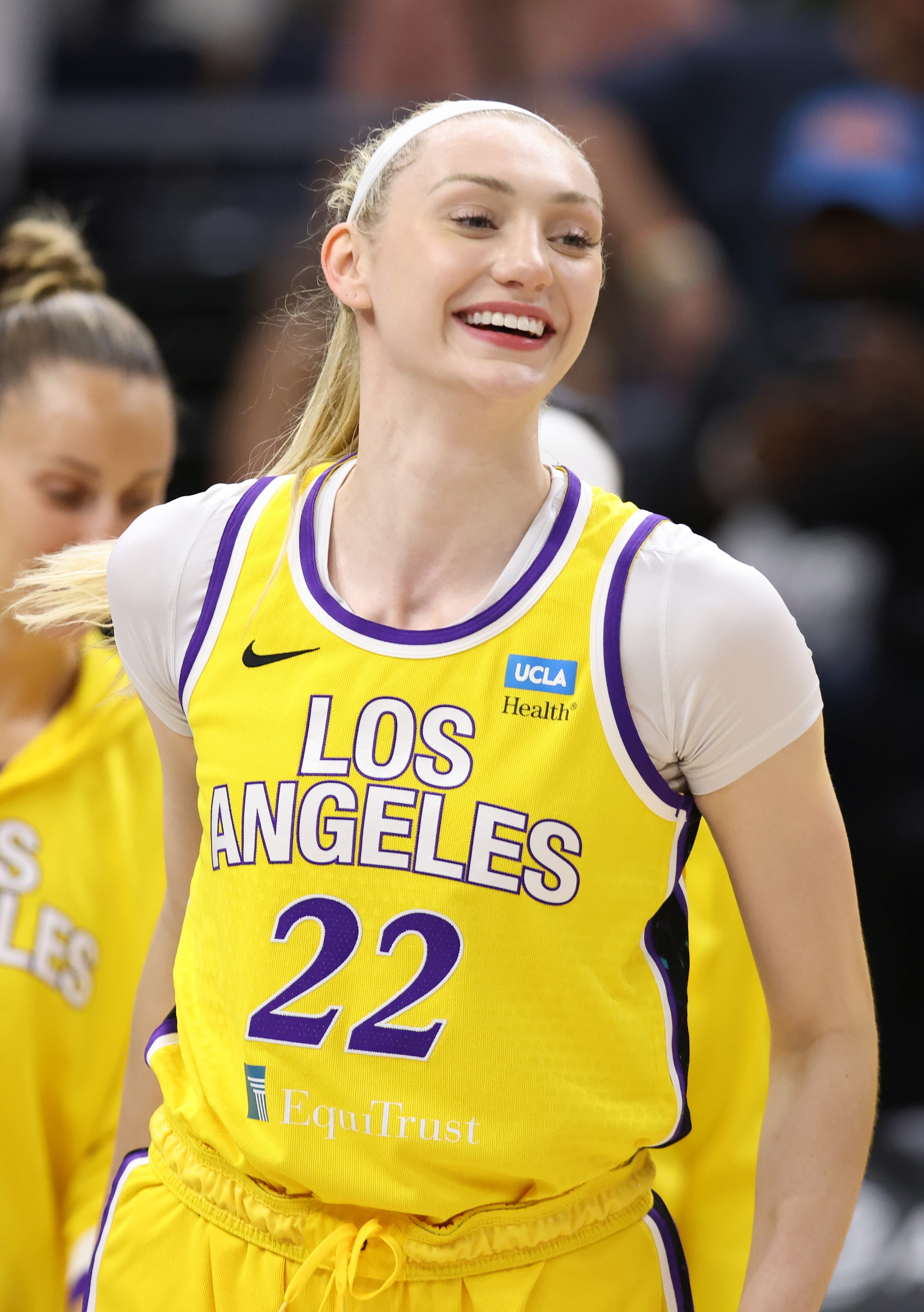
Cameron Brink was selected 2nd overall by the Los Angeles Sparks.

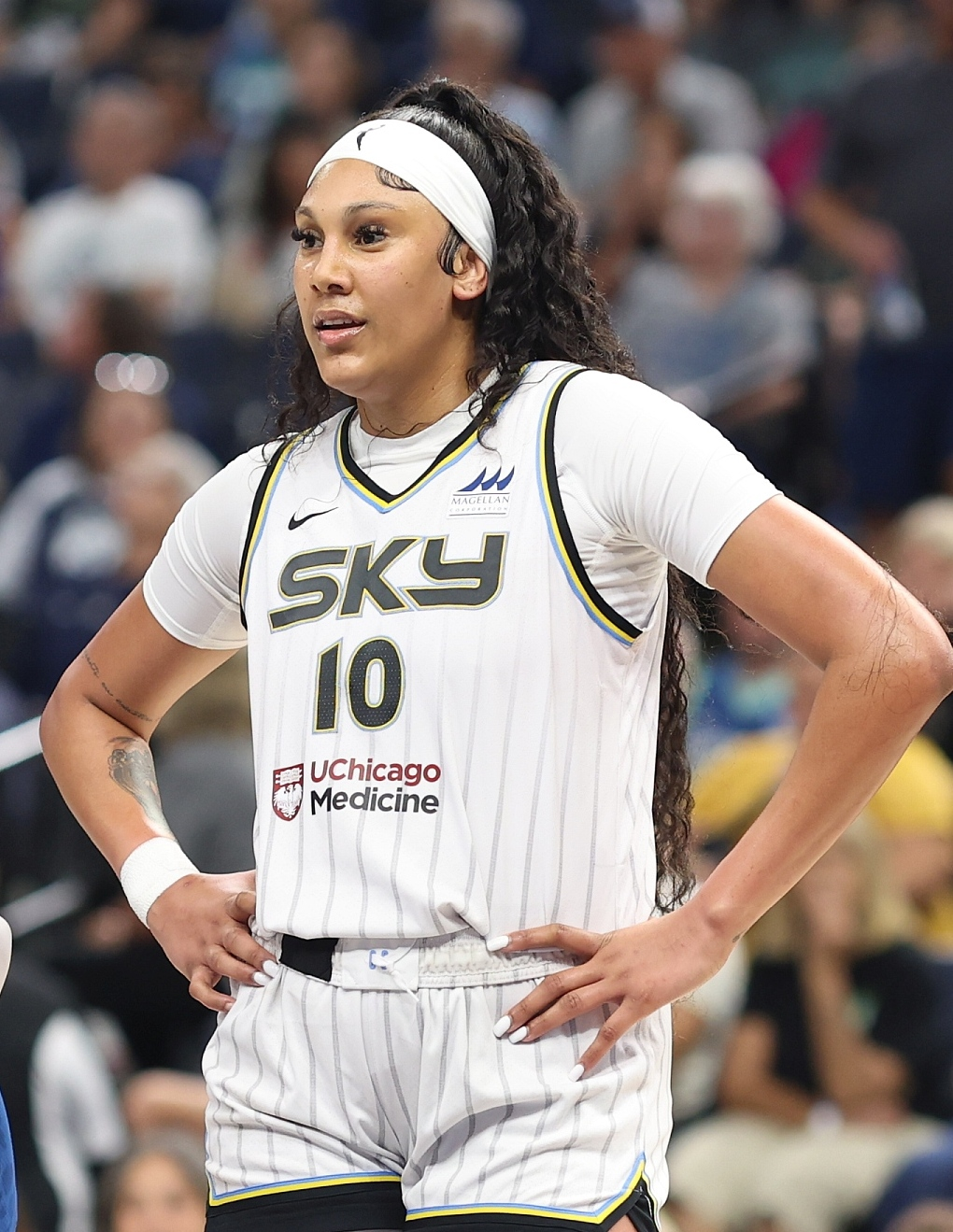
Kamilla Cardoso was selected 3rd overall by the Chicago Sky.

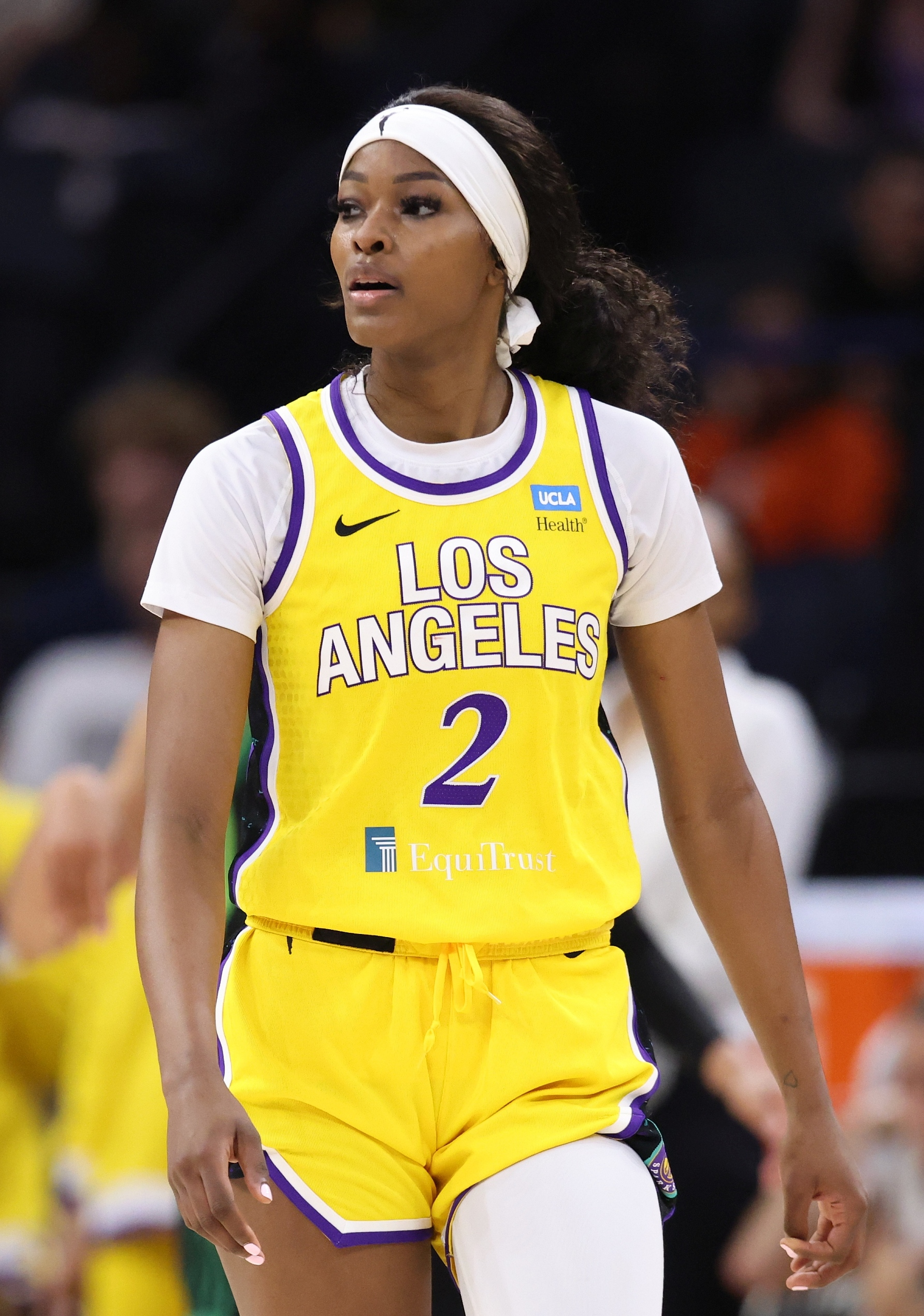
Rickea Jackson was selected 4th overall by the Los Angeles Sparks.

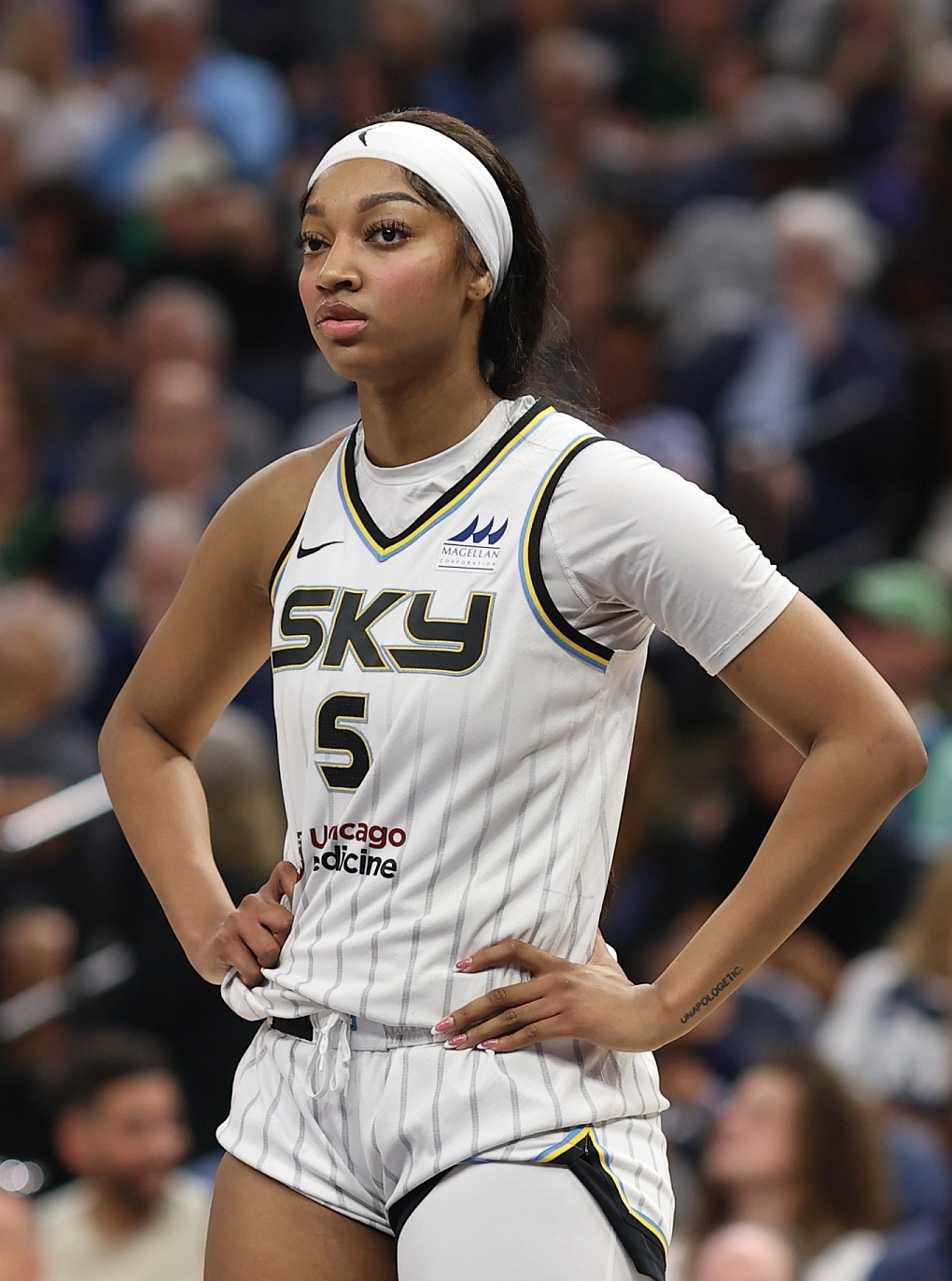
Angel Reese was selected 7th overall by the Chicago Sky.

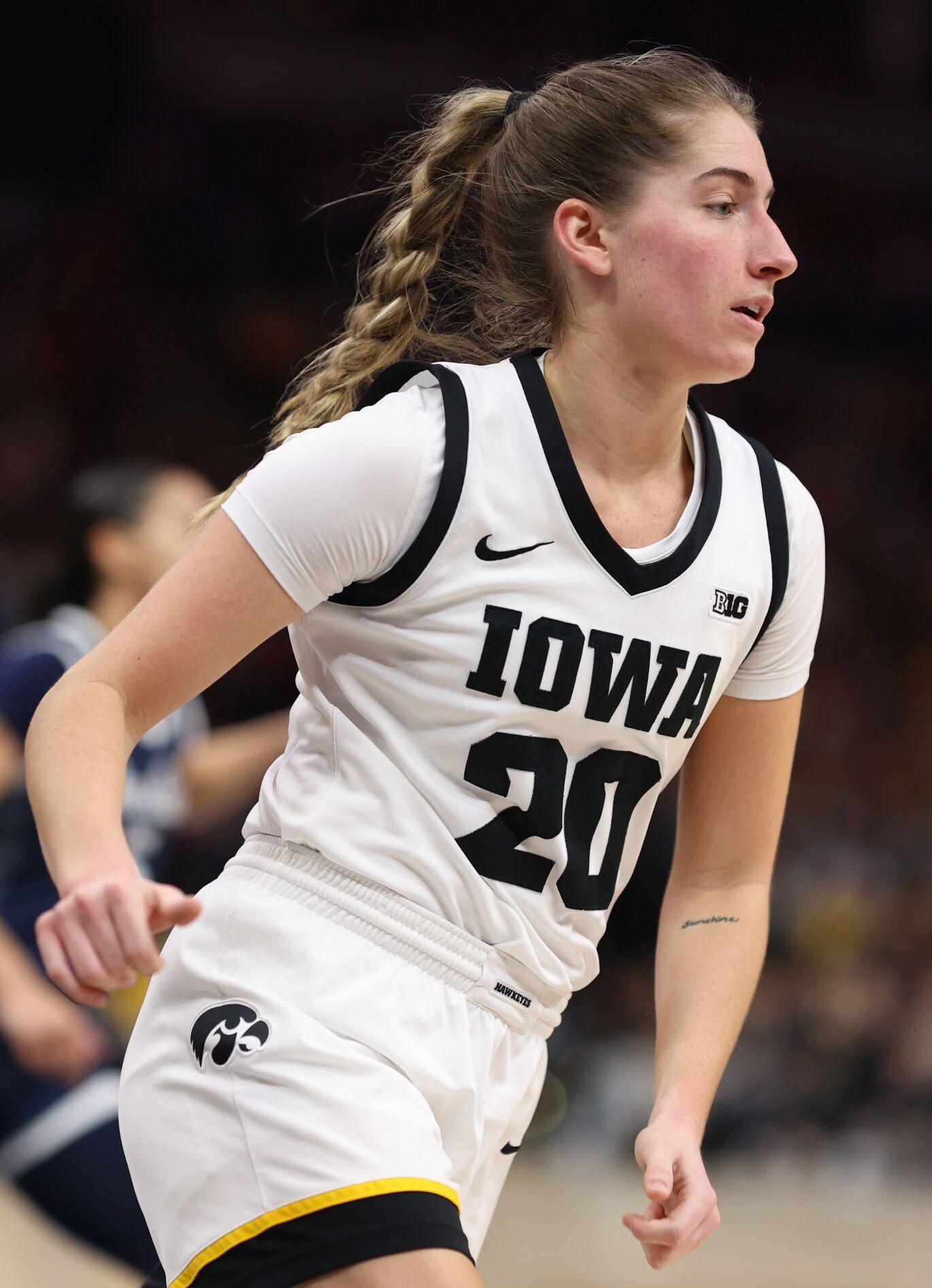
Kate Martin was selected 18th overall by the Las Vegas Aces.

*	Denotes player who has been selected for at least one All-Star Game and All-WNBA Team
**Bold**	Denotes player who won Rookie of the Year

=== First round ===
Pick	Player	Nationality	Team	School / club team
1	**Caitlin Clark^{*}**	United States	Indiana Fever	Iowa
2	Cameron Brink	United States	Los Angeles Sparks	Stanford
3	Kamilla Cardoso	Brazil	Chicago Sky (from Phoenix) (Note: February 6, 2024: Phoenix to Chicago: Phoenix acquired Kahleah Copper and Morgan Bertsch; Chicago acquired Brianna Turner, Michaela Onyenwere, a 2024 first-round pick (3rd overall), Chicago's own 2025 second-round pick, a 2026 first-round pick, and the right to swap 2026 second-round picks with Phoenix)	South Carolina
4	Rickea Jackson	United States	Los Angeles Sparks (from Seattle) (Note: January 31, 2024: Seattle to Los Angeles: Los Angeles acquired Kia Nurse and a 2024 first-round pick (4th overall); Seattle acquired a 2026 first-round-pick)	Tennessee
5	Jacy Sheldon	United States	Dallas Wings (from Chicago) (Note: February 11, 2023: Four-team trade among Chicago, Dallas, New York, and Phoenix: Chicago acquired Marina Mabrey and a 2024 second-round pick (from Phoenix); New York acquired rights to Leonie Fiebich, a 2024 second-round pick (from Chicago), and the right to swap 2025 first-round picks (from Phoenix); Phoenix acquired Michaela Onyenwere, 2024 third-round pick (from Chicago), and 2025 second-round pick (from Chicago); Dallas acquired Diamond DeShields, 2023 and 2024 first-round picks (from Chicago), and the right to swap 2025 first-round picks (from Chicago))	Ohio State
6	Aaliyah Edwards	Canada	Washington Mystics	UConn
7	Angel Reese^{*}	United States	Chicago Sky (from Minnesota) (Note: April 14, 2024: Chicago to Minnesota: Chicago acquired a 2024 first round pick (7th overall), and Nikolina Milić; Minnesota acquired a 2024 first round pick (8th overall), Sika Koné, a 2025 second-round pick, and right to swap 2026 first-round picks with Chicago.)	LSU
8	Alissa Pili	United States	Minnesota Lynx (from Chicago via Atlanta via Los Angeles) (Note: February 19, 2024: Los Angeles to Chicago: Los Angeles acquired Julie Allemand, the rights to Li Yueru and a 2025 third-round pick; Chicago acquired a 2024 first round pick (8th overall)) (Note: February 1, 2024: Atlanta to Los Angeles: Atlanta acquired Jordin Canada and Las Vegas' 2024 first-round pick (12th overall); Los Angeles acquired Aari McDonald and a 2024 first-round pick (8th overall))	Utah
9	Carla Leite	France	Dallas Wings	Tarbes (France)
10	Leïla Lacan	France	Connecticut Sun	Angers (France)
11	Marquesha Davis	United States	New York Liberty	Ole Miss
12	Nyadiew Puoch	Australia	Atlanta Dream (from Las Vegas via Los Angeles) (Note: January 21, 2023: Las Vegas to Los Angeles: Las Vegas acquired Amanda Zahui B and a 2024 second-round pick; Los Angeles acquired Dearica Hamby and a 2024 first round pick)	Southside Flyers (Australia)

=== Second round ===
Pick	Player	Nationality	Team	School / club team
13	Brynna Maxwell^{#}	United States	Chicago Sky (from Phoenix)	Gonzaga
14	Nika Mühl	Croatia	Seattle Storm	UConn
15	Celeste Taylor	United States	Indiana Fever	Ohio State
16	Dyaisha Fair	United States	Las Vegas Aces (from Los Angeles)	Syracuse
17	Esmery Martínez^{#}	Dominican Republic	New York Liberty (from Chicago)	Arizona
18	Kate Martin	United States	Las Vegas Aces (from Washington) (Note: February 5, 2023: Las Vegas to Washington: Las Vegas acquired 2024 and 2025 second-round picks; Washington acquired the rights to Amanda Zahui B)	Iowa
19	Taiyanna Jackson^{#}	United States	Connecticut Sun (from Minnesota) (Note: January 31, 2024: Connecticut to Minnesota: Connecticut acquired Tiffany Mitchell and a 2024 second-round pick (19th overall); Minnesota acquired Natisha Hiedeman)	Kansas
20	Isobel Borlase	Australia	Atlanta Dream	Adelaide Lightning (Australia)
21	Kaylynne Truong^{#}	United States Vietnam	Washington Mystics (from Dallas) (Note: April 10, 2023: Washington to Dallas: Dallas acquired the rights to Stephanie Soares; Washington acquired 2024 second-round and 2025 first-round picks (via Atlanta))	Gonzaga
22	Helena Pueyo^{#}	Spain	Connecticut Sun	Arizona
23	Jessika Carter	United States	New York Liberty	Mississippi State
24	Elizabeth Kitley	United States	Las Vegas Aces	Virginia Tech

=== Third round ===
Pick	Player	Nationality	Team	School / club team
25	Charisma Osborne	United States	Phoenix Mercury	UCLA
26	Mackenzie Holmes	United States	Seattle Storm	Indiana
27	Leilani Correa^{#}	United States	Indiana Fever	Florida
28	McKenzie Forbes^{#}	United States	Los Angeles Sparks	USC
29	Jaz Shelley^{#}	Australia	Phoenix Mercury (from Chicago)	Nebraska
30	Nastja Claessens^{#}	Belgium	Washington Mystics	Castors Braine (Belgium)
31	Kiki Jefferson^{#}	United States	Minnesota Lynx	Louisville
32	Matilde Villa^{#}	Italy	Atlanta Dream	Reyer Venezia (Italy)
33	Ashley Owusu^{#}	United States	Dallas Wings	Penn State
34	Abbey Hsu^{#}	United States	Connecticut Sun	Columbia
35	Kaitlyn Davis^{#}	United States	New York Liberty	USC
36	Angel Jackson^{#}	United States	Las Vegas Aces	Jackson State
