= NCAA Basketball All-Americans =

NCAA Basketball All-Americans may refer to:

- NCAA Men's Basketball All-Americans
- NCAA Women's Basketball All-Americans
