= 2014 NAIA Division I women's basketball tournament =

- Teams: 32
- Finals site: Frankfort Convention Center, Frankfort, Kentucky
- Champions: Oklahoma City Stars (7th title, 10th title game, 12th Fab Four)
- Runner-up: Freed–Hardeman Lions (1st title game, 5th Fab Four)
- Semifinalists: John Brown Golden Eagles (1st Fab Four); Wiley Wildcats (1st Fab Four)
- Coach of the year: Latricia Trammell (Oklahoma City)
- Player of the year: Nicole Ballestero (Vanguard)
- Charles Stevenson Hustle Award: Tia Pappas (Westminster (UT))
- Chuck Taylor MVP: Kayla MacKenzie (Oklahoma City)
- Top scorer: Alannah Sheets (Shawnee State) (63 points)

The 2014 NAIA Division I women's basketball tournament was the tournament held by the NAIA to determine the national champion of women's college basketball among its Division I members in the United States and Canada for the 2013–14 basketball season.

Oklahoma City defeated Freed–Hardeman in the championship game, 80–76, to claim the Stars' seventh NAIA national title.

The tournament was played at the Frankfort Convention Center in Frankfort, Kentucky.

== Qualification ==
The tournament field remained fixed at thirty-two teams, which were sorted into four quadrants of eight teams each. Within each quadrant, teams were seeded sequentially from one to eight based on record and season performance.

The tournament continued to utilize a simple single-elimination format.

== Bracket ==
First round
1	Campbellsville	84
8	Southern Poly	68
5	Xavier Louisiana	66
4	Westmont	53
3	Columbia (MO)	55
6	Montana State Northern	56
7	Langston	71
2	Oklahoma City	79
2	Georgetown (KY)	80
7	Loyola New Orleans	87
6	Talladega	94
3	Our Lady of the Lake	97
4	Lyon (AR)	53
5	John Brown	70
8	Cal State San Marcos	47
1	Vanguard	97
1	Freed–Hardeman	85
8	Huston–Tillotson	51
5	Wayland Baptist	79
4	Lewis–Clark State	85
3	Baker (KS)	74
6	Cumberlands (KY)	61
7	Bethel (TN)	82
2	The Master's	67
2	Oklahoma Baptist	91
7	Shawnee State	94*
6	Mobile	72
3	Wiley	74
4	MidAmerica Nazarene	97
5	Hope International	64
8	William Woods	50
1	Westminster (UT)	66

Second round
1	Campbellsville	59
5	Xavier Louisiana	55
6	Montana State Northern	55
2	Oklahoma City	58
7	Loyola New Orleans	72
3	Our Lady of the Lake	67
5	John Brown	62
1	Vanguard	61
1	Freed–Hardeman	99
4	Lewis–Clark State	64
3	Baker	72
7	Bethel (TN)	78
7	Shawnee State	70
3	Wiley	81
4	MidAmerica Nazarene	56
1	Westminster (UT)	65

Quarterfinals
1	Campbellsville	76
2	Oklahoma City	79
7	Loyola New Orleans	63
5	John Brown	65
1	Freed–Hardeman	66
7	Bethel (TN)	48
3	Wiley	75
1	Westminster (UT)	58

Semifinals
2	Oklahoma City	67
5	John Brown	65
1	Freed–Hardeman	87
3	Wiley	86

National championship
2	Oklahoma City	80
1	Freed–Hardeman	76

== See also ==
- 2014 NAIA Division I men's basketball tournament
- 2014 NCAA Division I women's basketball tournament
- 2014 NCAA Division II women's basketball tournament
- 2014 NCAA Division III women's basketball tournament
- 2014 NAIA Division II women's basketball tournament
