= Jaelyn Brown =

American basketball player (born 1998)

No. 8 – Panathinaikos
- Position: Small forward / power forward
- League: Greek League

Personal information
- Born: October 12, 1998 (age 28) Murrieta, California, U.S.
- Listed height: 6 ft 1 in (1.85 m)
- Listed weight: 170 lb (77 kg)

Career information
- High school: Vista Murrieta (Murrieta, California)
- College: California (2016–2020)
- WNBA draft: 2020: undrafted
- Playing career: 2020–present

Career history
- 2020: Toulouse Métropole Basket
- 2021–2022: Norrköping Dolphins
- 2022: Ludovika Csata
- 2022–2023: Rize Belediyesi
- 2023: Astros de Jalisco
- 2023: Maccabi Haifa
- 2023: Hatayspor
- 2023–2024: Antalya Toroslar Basketbol
- 2024: Dallas Wings
- 2024–2025: Dynamo Kursk
- 2025: Connecticut Sun
- 2025–present: Panathinaikos
- Stats at Basketball Reference
Medals
Women's 3x3 basketball
Representing the United States
FIBA 3x3 Under-18 World Cup
| Silver medal – second place | 2016 Kazakhstan | Team |

Jaelyn Brown (born October 12, 1998) is an American professional basketball player who is currently a free agent. She played college basketball for the California Golden Bears. Afterwards, she played overseas for teams in France, Sweden, Hungary, Turkey, Mexico and Israel before making her debut in the WNBA with the Dallas Wings in 2024.

== Early life ==
Brown was born on October 12, 1998, in Murrieta, California. She was born with two club feet and was in a cast for six months, but was able to walk normally by 10 months of age. She played basketball starting at a young age. At age 13, she played for the U15 squad of the club Cal Sparks and helped them reach the semifinals of the Fila Nationals tournament. She then moved up to the U17 team and helped them compile a record of 44–1 with a ranking of second in the nation.

Brown attended Vista Murrieta High School and had 24 points, 11 rebounds, six steals and three assists in her debut on the varsity as a freshman. She then helped them go 23–7 as a sophomore and was the team leader with 18.3 points, 3.7 steals and 1.2 blocks per game, also averaging 9.6 rebounds. The following season, she had averages of 18 points, 11.5 rebounds, four assists and three steals.

Brown was named All-CIF Southern Section as a freshman, sophomore and junior (2013, 2014, 2015), All-Southwestern League and the Southwestern League most valuable player all three years, and helped Vista Murrieta win the conference title each year while being regional semifinalists in 2013 and 2015, sectional quarterfinalists in 2014 and 2015, and sectional semifinalists in 2013. The Press-Enterprise selected her their girls basketball player of the year for the 2015 season. She was highly recruited and was ranked by ESPN as a four-star recruit and the 54th-best player nationally.

Prior to her senior year, Brown suffered a torn ACL, torn MCL, torn meniscus and compressed cartilage artery, which resulted in her missing the season. Overall, in her high school career, she averaged 16.6 points, 10.5 rebounds, 3.4 steals, 2.7 assists and 1.2 blocks per game. She committed to play college basketball for the California Golden Bears.

== College career ==
Brown appeared in all 34 games for the Golden Bears as a freshman during the 2016–17 season, averageing 4.8 points and 2.5 rebounds per game. She was the Pac-12 Conference Freshman of the Week following a 21-point performance against Oregon State and ended the season with honorable mention Pac-12 All-Freshman honors. The following year, she played all 32 games while seeing her first action as a starter (two games), ending with 6.2 points and 2.3 rebounds per game while being the team leader with 37.9% of her three-point field goal shots being made.

Brown helped California reach the second round of the NCAA Tournament in the 2018–19 season while appearing in all 33 games, 32 as a starter. She totaled 7.9 points per game which was fifth-best on the team and was second with 4.1 rebounds per game, also being second on the team in field goal percentage (49%). As a senior in the 2019–20 season, she averaged 15.1 points and 5.5 rebounds per game and was named honorable mention All-Pac-12 Conference. She graduated in 2020.

== Professional career ==
=== Overseas ===
==== Toulouse Métropole Basket ====
Brown was not selected in the 2020 WNBA draft. She signed her first professional contract as a member of Toulouse Métropole Basket, in France's Ligue 2, in August 2020. There, she averaged 7.5 points and 4.8 rebounds in four games. She left the team in November 2020 and was set on retiring, playing no basketball for the next eight months.

==== Norrköping Dolphins ====
However, Brown received a chance to play for the Norrköping Dolphins in Sweden's top league – Basketligan dam – in 2021 and joined them. She became a top player for the team, having averaged 13.4 points and 7.2 rebounds by the time of the playoffs while the team had a regular season record of 20–6. She helped them ultimately win the national championship.

==== Ludovika Csata ====
In August 2022, Brown signed with Ludovika Csata of the Hungarian A Division. She appeared in six regular season games and averaged 16.7 points and 6.8 rebounds, also appearing in two games for the team in the EuroCup Women where she averaged 13.0 points and 5.0 rebounds.

==== Rize Belediyesi ====
Brown signed with Rize Belediyesi of the Turkish Women's Basketball Super League (KSBL) following the Hungarian season. She appeared in 12 games during the 2022–23 season and recorded averages of 18.8 points and 11.3 rebounds per game. She received league player of the week honors and also was named the Hoops Agent Player of the Week after a game with 32 points and 23 rebounds.

==== Astros de Jalisco ====
In April 2023, Brown signed with the Mexican team Astros de Jalisco of the Liga Nacional de Baloncesto Profesional Femenil (LNBPF). In nine games, she averaged 11.7 points and 5.0 rebounds.

==== Maccabi Haifa ====
Brown signed with Maccabi Haifa in Israel in June 2023.

==== Hatayspor ====
Later in 2023, Brown returned to Turkey, signing with Hatayspor in the KSBL. She appeared in seven games for the club from October to December, averaging 21.7 points and 10.1 rebounds while playing 39.6 minutes per game.

==== Antalya Toroslar Basketbol ====
In December 2023, Brown left Hatayspor for Antalya Toroslar Basketbol in the KSBL. She appeared in 12 games for the team and had averages of 16.9 points and 7.3 rebounds while seeing 33.5 minutes of playing time per game.

=== WNBA ===
==== Dallas Wings (2024) ====
Brown signed a training camp contract with the Dallas Wings of the Women's National Basketball Association (WNBA) on February 20, 2024. In her preseason debut against the Indiana Fever, she recorded 21 points, tying for the game-high with Caitlin Clark. She made the team's final roster.

Brown was traded from the Wings to the Fever on February 2, 2025. On May 13, 2025, Brown was waived by the Indiana Fever.

==== Connecticut Sun (2025) ====
On June 2, 2025, Brown signed with the Connecticut Sun. On July 13, she was waived by the Sun.

== National team career ==
Brown competed for the United States women's national under-18 3x3 team at the 2016 FIBA 3x3 Under-18 World Championships.

== Career statistics ==
Legend
| GP | Games played | GS | Games started | MPG | Minutes per game | RPG | Rebounds per game |
| APG | Assists per game | SPG | Steals per game | BPG | Blocks per game | PPG | Points per game |
| TO | Turnovers per game | FG% | Field-goal percentage | 3P% | 3-point field-goal percentage | FT% | Free-throw percentage |
| **Bold** | Career best | ° | League leader |

=== WNBA ===
==== Regular season ====
Stats current as of game on June 29, 2025

WNBA regular season statistics
| Year | Team | GP | GS | MPG | FG% | 3P% | FT% | RPG | APG | SPG | BPG | TO | PPG |
|---|---|---|---|---|---|---|---|---|---|---|---|---|---|
| 2024 | Dallas | **14** | **1** | 10.1 | **.484** | **.500** | .333 | **1.5** | **0.4** | 0.3 | **0.3** | 0.9 | 2.6 |
| 2025 | Connecticut | 10 | 0 | **13.1** | .378 | .444 | **.500** | 1.2 | 0.1 | **0.5** | 0.2 | **0.5** | **3.7** |
| **Career** | 2 years, 2 teams | 24 | 1 | 11.3 | .426 | .467 | .400 | 1.4 | 0.3 | 0.4 | 0.3 | 0.7 | 3.1 |

=== College ===
NCAA statistics
| Year | Team | GP | GS | MPG | FG% | 3P% | FT% | RPG | APG | SPG | BPG | TO | PPG |
|---|---|---|---|---|---|---|---|---|---|---|---|---|---|
| 2016–17 | California | **34** | 0 | 16.6 | .396 | .282 | .667 | 2.5 | 1.4 | 0.7 | 0.3 | 1.7 | 4.8 |
| 2017–18 | California | 32 | 2 | 19.6 | .408 | **.379** | .679 | 2.3 | 0.9 | 0.3 | 0.3 | 1.6 | 6.2 |
| 2018–19 | California | 33 | **32** | 24.2 | **.490** | .356 | .723 | 4.1 | 0.9 | 0.7 | 0.3 | **1.1** | 7.9 |
| 2019–20 | California | 31 | 31 | **31.5** | .412 | .337 | **.827** | **5.5** | **1.9** | **0.9** | **0.6** | 2.0 | **15.1** |
| **Career** | | 130 | 65 | 22.8 | .426 | .342 | .751 | 3.6 | 1.3 | 0.6 | 0.4 | 1.6 | 8.4 |
