= Mr. Basketball =

Honor awarded to high school basketball players

Mr. Basketball is an unofficial award given to the person chosen as the best high school boys basketball player in many U.S. states, regions, or metropolitan areas. Conversely, the title Miss Basketball or Ms. Basketball is used for the best high school female basketball player. The honor is usually awarded by the state or region's largest newspaper by the high school sports division of their sports department, and usually solidifies their position as the most recruited player by universities to play college basketball.

== See also ==
- Mr. Basketball USA
- Miss Basketball
