= Latricia Trammell =

American basketball coach (born 1968)

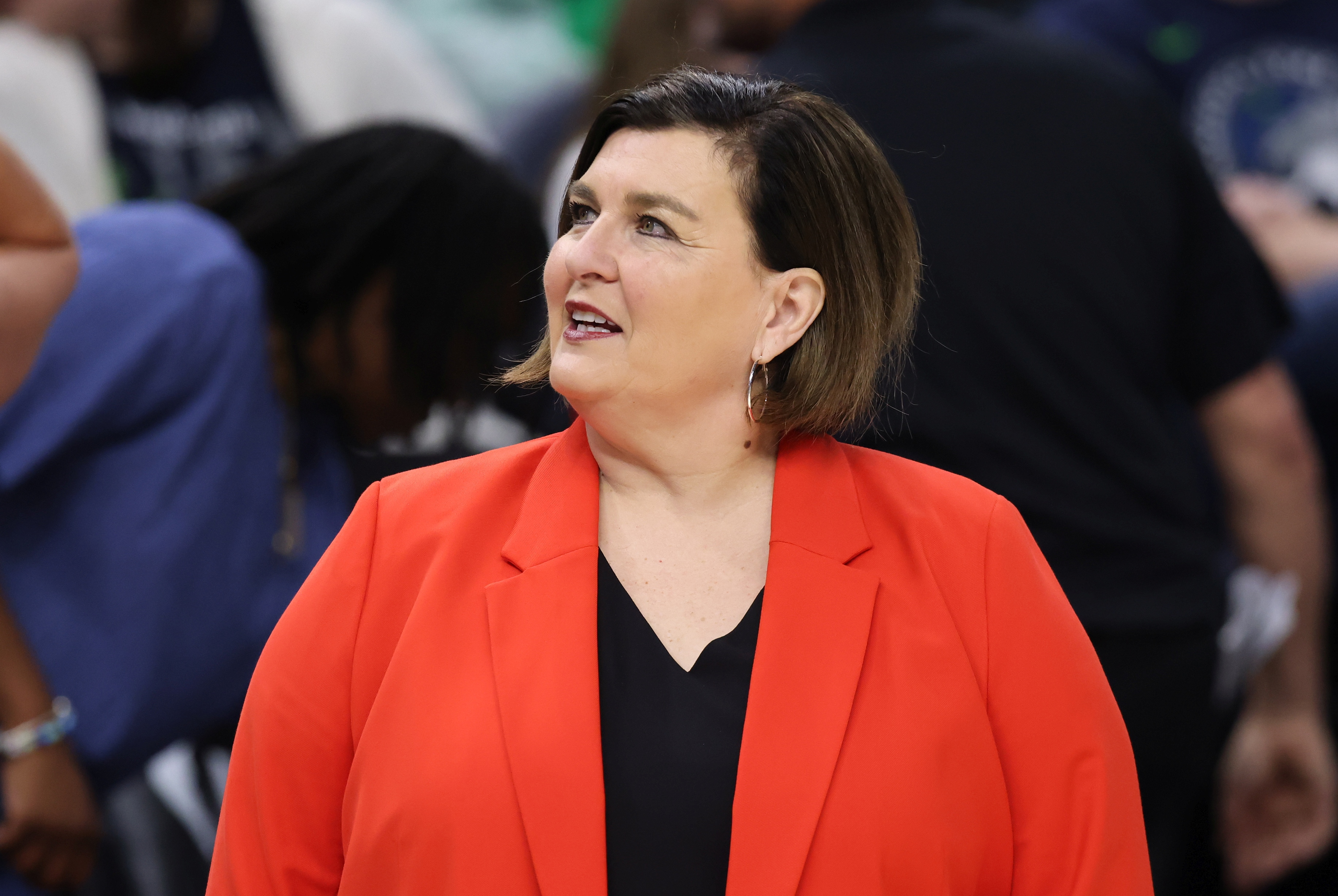
- Trammell as Dallas Wings head coach in 2024

Chicago Sky
- Position: Assistant coach
- League: WNBA

Personal information
- Born: February 20, 1968 (age 58) Claremore, Oklahoma, U.S.

Career information
- High school: Seminole (Seminole, Oklahoma)
- College: Seminole State College; East Central University
- Coaching career: 1994–present

Career history
- 1994–1997: Midwest City High School (assistant)
- 1997–1999: Midwest City High School
- 1999–2002: Billy Ryan High School
- 2003–2005: Texas Woman's University (assistant)
- 2005–2007: Oklahoma City University (assistant)
- 2007–2012: Western State
- 2012–2015: Oklahoma City University
- 2015–2017: Georgia State (assistant)
- 2017: San Antonio Stars (assistant)
- 2019–2022: Los Angeles Sparks (assistant)
- 2023–2024: Dallas Wings
- 2025: Los Angeles Sparks (assistant)
- 2026–present: Chicago Sky (assistant)

Latricia Trammell (born February 20, 1968) is an American basketball coach who is currently an assistant coach for the Chicago Sky. She previously served as the head coach of the Dallas Wings. Trammell has also served as an assistant coach for the San Antonio Stars and coached at the collegiate level.

== Early life and education ==
Trammell grew up in Oklahoma and is a Cherokee Nation citizen. She was a prep star at Seminole High School, scoring a single game state record of 46 points. Following her high school years, Trammell attended Seminole State College and East Central University, earning a bachelor of science degree in biology in 1992 from the latter.

== Coaching career ==
Trammell began her coaching career at the high school level. She coached in both Texas and Oklahoma and recorded a 105-45 record before she left for the collegiate ranks.

Trammell moved to Western Colorado University and helped turn the program around, ranking third all-time in program wins. She coached three years at Oklahoma City University, where she helped guide that team to back-to-back NAIA championships. She was also named the NAIA Coach of the Year in both seasons that they won the title. Trammell moved onto Georgia State University, where she was an assistant coach for two years.

=== San Antonio Stars ===
Trammell joined the coaching staff for the San Antonio Stars of the WNBA in 2017. 2017 was the final year for the Stars in San Antonio and Trammell was not retained when the team relocated to Las Vegas.

=== Los Angeles Sparks ===
Trammell joined the Los Angeles Sparks staff in 2019 under head coach Derek Fisher. During her time in LA, Trammell was a part of playoff seasons with the Sparks and was known for her defensive focus. She was in charge of a Sparks defense that put four players on WNBA All-Defensive teams, including 2020 Defensive Player of the Year Candace Parker.

=== Dallas Wings ===
Trammell got her first head coaching job in the WNBA for the 2023 season, when she joined the Dallas Wings organization. Following the 2024 season, Trammell was relieved of her duties as head coach.

=== Los Angeles Sparks (second stint) ===
On July 22, 2025, Trammell was hired to serve as special assistant to Sparks head coach Lynne Roberts.

=== Chicago Sky ===
On November 25, 2025, Trammell joined the Chicago Sky as an assistant coach under head coach Tyler Marsh.

== Head coaching record ==
=== College ===
Record table
Season	Team	Overall	Conference	Standing	Postseason
Western State Mountaineers (Rocky Mountain Athletic Conference) (2007–2012)
2007–08	Western State	13–14	7–12	5th (West)	
2008–09	Western State	14–14	10–9	T–3rd (West)	
2009–10	Western State	11–17	9–10	T–4th (West)	
2010–11	Western State	11–16	9–13	T–8th	
2011–12	Western State	16–15	13–9	4th	
Western State:		65–76 (.461)			
Oklahoma City Stars (Sooner Athletic Conference) (2012–2015)
2012–13	Oklahoma City	28–4	16–0	1st	NAIA Elite Eight
2013–14	Oklahoma City	27–4	18–2	1st	NAIA champions
2014–15	Oklahoma City	30–2	17–1	1st	NAIA champions
Oklahoma City:		85–10 (.895)			
Total:		150–86 (.636)			

=== WNBA ===
Legend
Regular season	G	Games coached	W	Games won	L	Games lost	W–L %	Win–loss %
Playoffs	PG	Playoff games	PW	Playoff wins	PL	Playoff losses	PW–L %	Playoff win–loss %

Team	Year	G	W	L	W–L%	Finish	PG	PW	PL	PW–L%	Result
DAL	2023	40	22	18	.550	2nd in West	5	2	3	.400	Lost in semifinals
DAL	2024	40	9	31	.225	5th in West	—	—	—		Missed playoffs
Career		80	31	49	.388		5	2	3	.400	
