= Miss Basketball =

High school girls basketball award

Miss Basketball (Ms. Basketball) is an award given to the best high school girls basketball player in many U.S. states.

== History and terminology ==
The spread of state-level Miss Basketball awards coincided with rapid growth in girls’ interscholastic sports participation after Title IX in 1972.

Early adopters included Kentucky (first Miss Kentucky Basketball named in 1976), and Indiana (first Indiana Miss Basketball in 1976). Minnesota followed in 1978, and Michigan’s coaches association began naming Miss Basketball in 1981.

== Notable recipients ==
- Paige Bueckers (Minnesota, 2020) - later a №1 pick in the WNBA draft.
- Jackie Young (Indiana, 2016) - later a №1 pick and WNBA champion.

== See also ==
- Mr. Basketball
- Mr. Basketball USA
- Naismith Prep Player of the Year Award#Girls
