= Ashley Owusu =

American basketball player

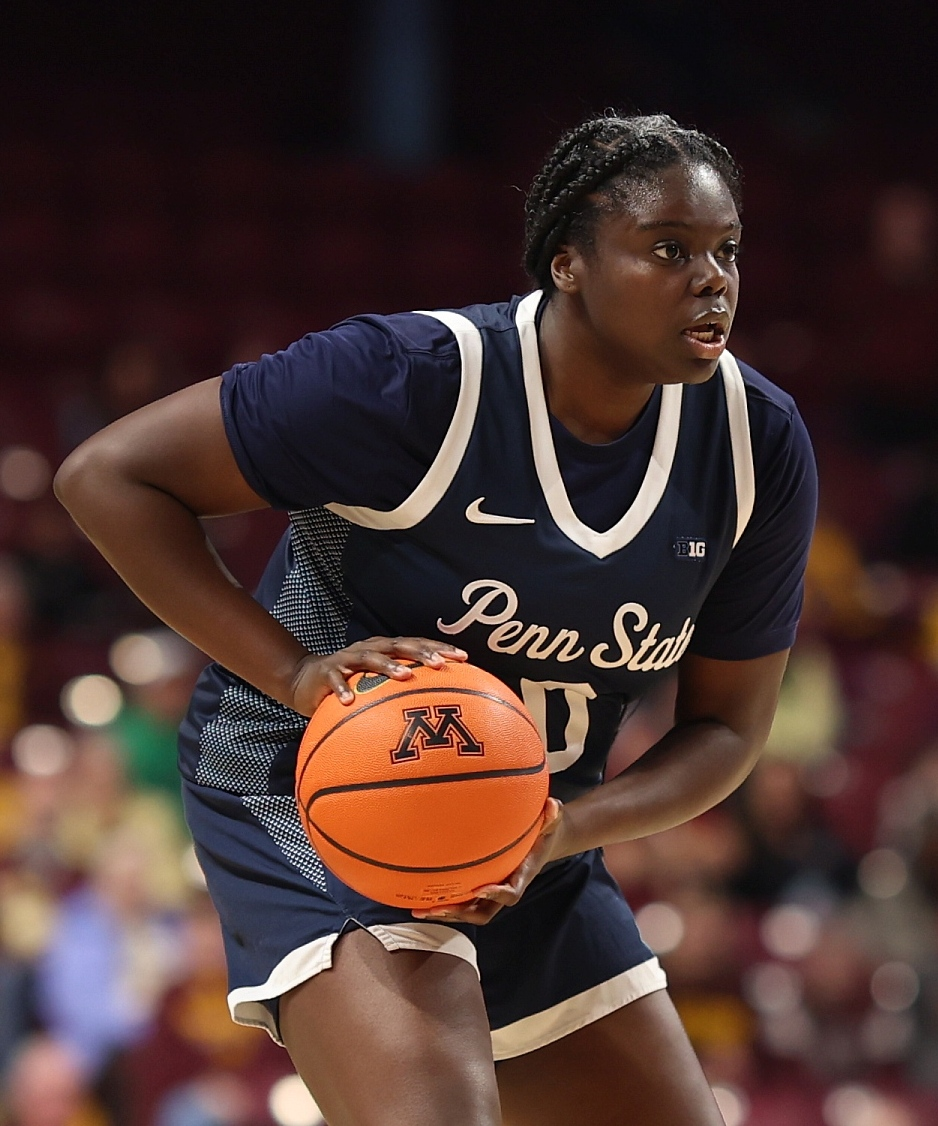
- Owusu with Penn State in 2024

No. 0 – Elitzur Holon
- Position: Shooting guard / point guard
- League: Israeli Female Basketball Premier League

Personal information
- Born: January 22, 2001 (age 25) Queens, New York, U.S.
- Listed height: 6 ft 0 in (1.83 m)
- Listed weight: 190 lb (86 kg)

Career information
- High school: Paul VI Catholic (Chantilly, Virginia)
- College: Maryland (2019–2022): Virginia Tech (2022–2023); Penn State (2023–2024)
- WNBA draft: 2024: 3rd round, 33rd overall pick
- Drafted by: Dallas Wings
- Playing career: 2024–present

Career history
- 2024–2025: Elitzur Holon

Career highlights
- Third-team All-American – AP, USBWA (2021); Ann Meyers Drysdale Award (2021); First-team All-Big Ten (2021); 3× Second-team All-Big Ten (2020, 2022, 2024); Big Ten Freshman of the Year (2020); Big Ten All-Freshman Team (2020); 2× Big Ten tournament MVP (2020, 2021); McDonald's All-American (2019)
- Stats at Basketball Reference
Medals
Women's basketball
Representing United States
FIBA AmeriCup
| Gold medal – first place | 2021 Puerto Rico | Team |

Ashley Ann Owusu (born January 22, 2001) is an American professional basketball player for Elitzur Holon of the Israeli Female Basketball Premier League. She was selected by the Dallas Wings in the 2024 WNBA draft. She played college basketball at Maryland, Virginia Tech and Penn State.

== College career ==
=== Maryland ===
Owusu was thrust into a leadership role in her sophomore season after five seniors graduated and three players transferred out of the program. She scored her then-career high of 25 points in a game against Towson, breaking it less than a month later with a 34-point performance against Penn State.

In addition to being named a third-team All-American, Owusu was also named the recipient of the Ann Meyers Drysdale Award, awarded to the top college basketball shooting guard in the country. She was named the most outstanding player of the 2020 Big Ten women's basketball tournament.

=== Virginia Tech ===
On May 4, 2022, Virginia Tech head coach Kenny Brooks announced that his team had added Owusu to their team with two years of eligibility remaining.

=== Penn State ===
After losing her starting spot at Virginia Tech and playing very limited minutes in the second half of the season, Owusu announced on June 1, 2023 that she was transferring to Penn State.

== Professional career ==
Owusu was drafted with the ninth pick in the third round (33 overall) of the 2024 WNBA draft by the Dallas Wings. On 5 May 2024, Owusu was waived by the Dallas Wings.

Owusu signed with Elitzur Holon of the Israeli Female Basketball Premier League for the 2024–2025 season.

== National team career ==
Owusu accepted an invite to attend AmeriCup trials for the United States national team in 2021.

== Career statistics ==
Legend
| GP | Games played | GS | Games started | MPG | Minutes per game | RPG | Rebounds per game |
| APG | Assists per game | SPG | Steals per game | BPG | Blocks per game | PPG | Points per game |
| TO | Turnovers per game | FG% | Field-goal percentage | 3P% | 3-point field-goal percentage | FT% | Free-throw percentage |
| **Bold** | Career best | ° | League leader |

=== College ===
| Year | Team | GP | GS | MPG | FG% | 3P% | FT% | RPG | APG | SPG | BPG | TO | PPG |
|---|---|---|---|---|---|---|---|---|---|---|---|---|---|
| 2019–20 | Maryland | **32** | 16 | 26.9 | 44.6 | 31.0 | 73.2 | 3.8 | 5.4 | **1.5** | 0.2 | 2.4 | 12.0 |
| 2020–21 | Maryland | 29 | **29** | **31.1** | **49.3** | 28.9 | 76.2 | **5.6** | **5.9** | 1.3 | 0.2 | 2.6 | **17.9** |
| 2021–22 | Maryland | 27 | 25 | 29.0 | 42.4 | 40.6 | **79.7** | 3.1 | 3.7 | 0.9 | 0.1 | 2.2 | 14.3 |
| 2022–23 | Virginia Tech | 17 | 7 | 15.1 | 39.2 | **53.3** | 72.7 | 1.5 | 1.0 | 0.3 | 0.1 | **1.2** | 5.1 |
| 2023–24 | Penn State | 20 | 18 | 27.2 | 46.6 | 32.3 | 76.1 | 5.5 | 3.6 | 0.9 | **0.4** | 2.8 | 17.7 |
| **Career** | | 125 | 95 | 26.8 | 45.5 | 34.4 | 76.2 | 4.0 | 4.3 | 1.1 | 0.2 | 2.3 | 13.8 |
Statistics retrieved from Sports-Reference.
