= Stephanie Soares =

Brazilian basketball player (born 2000)

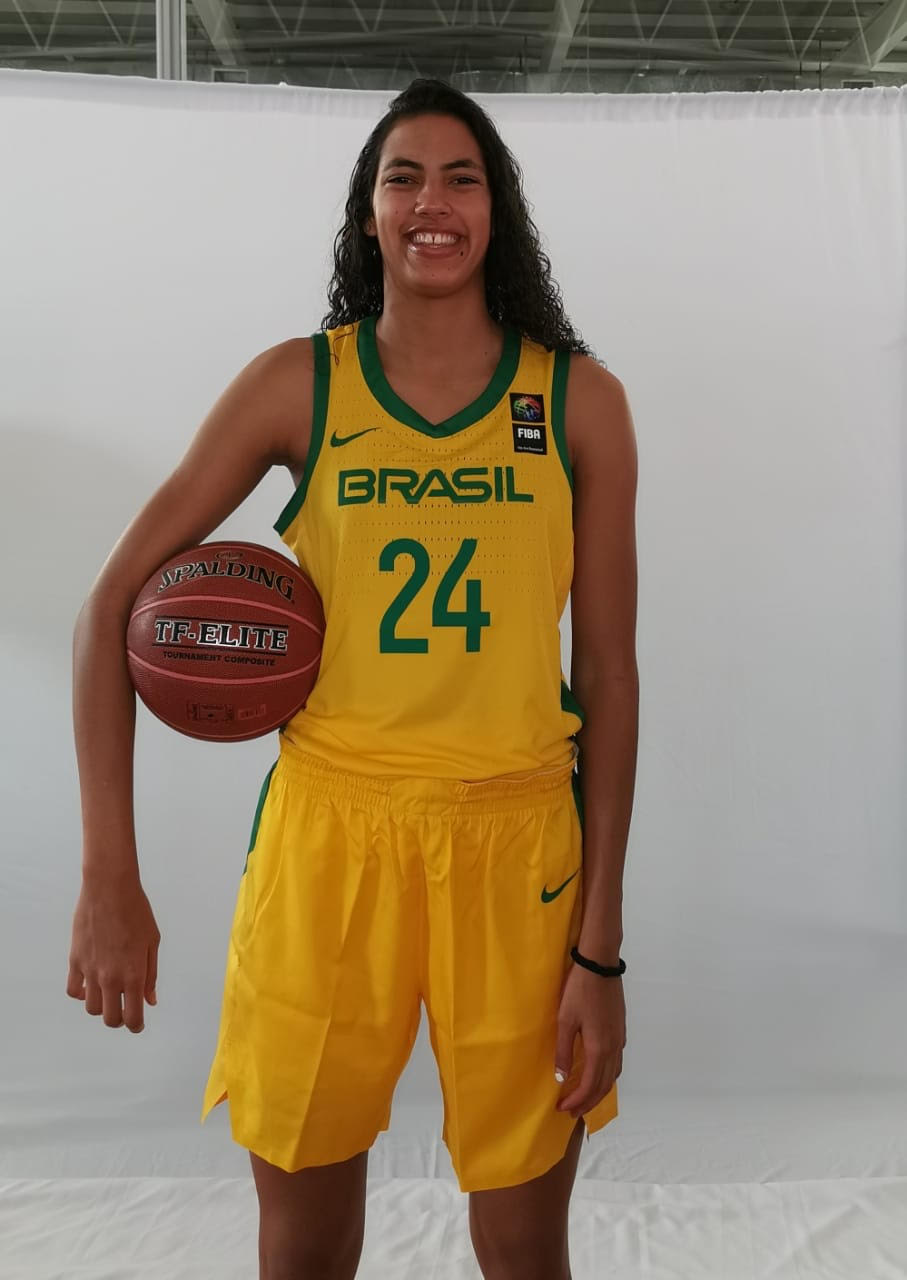
- Soares at the 2019 Pan American Games

Personal information
- Born: 17 April 2000 (age 26) São Paulo, Brazil
- Listed height: 6 ft 6 in (1.98 m)
- Listed weight: 196 lb (89 kg)

Career information
- College: The Master's (2018–2022); Iowa State (2022–2023)
- WNBA draft: 2023: 1st round, 4th overall pick
- Drafted by: Washington Mystics
- Playing career: 2024–present
- Position: Forward
- Number: 10

Career history
- 2024: Dallas Wings
- Stats at Basketball Reference
Medals
Representing Brazil
Women's basketball
Pan American Games
Gold medal – first place	2019 Lima	Team

Stephanie Soares (born 17 April 2000) is a Brazilian professional basketball player who last played in the Women's National Basketball Association (WNBA) for the Dallas Wings. She played college basketball at The Master's University and Iowa State. She represented Brazil at the 2019 Pan American Games and won a gold medal.

== College career ==
Soares began her collegiate career at The Master's University. During the 2018–19 season in her freshman year, she led the nation in rebounding (470), blocked shots (173), and recorded 29 double-doubles. She set the single-season program records for rebounds, rebounding average, and blocked shots. Following the season she was named the Golden State Athletic Conference (GSAC) Player of the Year and GSAC Defensive Player of the Year.

During the 2019–20 season, she averaged 20.7 points and 13.6 rebound, and led the nation in rebounds (423), defensive rebounds (326), blocked shots, (151), and double-doubles (24). Following the season she was named the GSAC Player of the Year and GSAC Defensive Player of the Year for the second consecutive year. She was also named to the WBCA NAIA All-America team and named the WBCA NAIA Player of the Year. She became the first player in TMU history to be named NAIA Player of the Year.

She missed the 2020–21 season after she underwent surgery to repair tears in both her anterior cruciate ligament (ACL) and medial collateral ligament (MCL). During the 2021–22 season, she averaged 20.5 points and 12.7 rebounds, and helped lead The Master's University 32–4 record and the NAIA national quarterfinals. Following the season she was named the NAIA Player of the Year. She was also named to the WBCA NAIA All-America team and named the WBCA NAIA Player of the Year for the second time in her career.

On 19 April 2022, Soares announced she was transferring to Iowa State. During the 2022–23 season, Soares started all 13 games she played in before suffering a season-ending ACL injury at Oklahoma on 8 January 2023. She recorded eight double-doubles and averaged 15.4 points and 10.8 rebounds per game.

== Professional career ==
On 10 April 2023, Soares was drafted fourth overall by the Washington Mystics in the 2023 WNBA draft. She was immediately traded to the Dallas Wings in exchange for a 2024 second-round draft pick, and Atlanta's 2025 first-round draft pick. On 6 February 2024, she signed with the Wings. She missed the 2023 WNBA season after recovering from ACL surgery.

On 13 August 2024, Soares signed with AZS AJP Gorzów Wielkopolski of the Basket Liga Kobiet (BLK) for the 2024–25 season. However, she was unable to join the team due to a knee injury.

On 4 January 2025, Soares was waived by the Wings.

== National team career ==
Soares made her international debut for Brazil at the 2019 Pan American Games. During the tournament she averaged 5.6 points and 2.4 rebounds in five games. She averaged 16 minutes a game and led the team with seven blocked shots and won a gold medal.

== Career statistics ==
Legend
GP	Games played	GS	Games started	MPG	Minutes per game	RPG	Rebounds per game
APG	Assists per game	SPG	Steals per game	BPG	Blocks per game	PPG	Points per game
TO	Turnovers per game	FG%	Field-goal percentage	3P%	3-point field-goal percentage	FT%	Free-throw percentage
**Bold**	Career best	°	League leader

=== WNBA ===
Stats current through end of 2024 season

WNBA regular season statistics
Year	Team	GP	GS	MPG	FG%	3P%	FT%	RPG	APG	SPG	BPG	TO	PPG
2024	Dallas	22	3	8.0	.294	.167	1.000	2.1	0.5	0.1	0.4	0.5	1.1
**Career**	1 year, 1 team	22	3	8.0	.294	.167	1.000	2.1	0.5	0.1	0.4	0.5	1.1

=== College ===
NAIA/NCAA statistics
Year	Team	GP	GS	MPG	FG%	3P%	FT%	RPG	APG	SPG	BPG	TO	PPG
2018–19	TMU	**35**	**34**	29.8	.572	.000	.628	13.4	1.3	1.4	**4.9**	**2.3**	16.2
2019–20	TMU	31	31	29.5	**.615**	**.347**	.755	**13.6**	2.1	1.3	**4.9**	3.6	**20.7**
2020–21	TMU	Did not play due to injury											
2021–22	TMU	34	33	**30.1**	.584	.228	**.789**	12.2	**2.2**	**1.9**	3.7	3.5	20.5
2022–23	Iowa State	13	13	22.6	.544	.306	.667	9.9	1.4	1.1	3.0	2.8	14.4
**Career**		113	111	28.0	.579	.220	.710	12.3	1.8	1.4	4.1	3.1	18.0

== Personal life ==
Soares is the daughter of Rogerio and Susan Soares, who were Christian missionaries. She has four siblings, Tim, Jessica, Tiago and Rebecca. Her father played for The Master's University (TMU) men's basketball team, while her mother was the national Gatorade Basketball Player of the Year as a high school senior in 1986, and played college basketball at Texas. Tim, Jessica and Tiago all also played college basketball at TMU.
