= 2022 New York Liberty season =

26th season for the New York Liberty franchise of the WNBA

- Head coach: Sandy Brondello
- Arena: Barclays Center

Results
- Record: 16–20 (.444)
- Place: 4th (Eastern)
- Playoff finish: 7th seed Lost in 1st Round to the Chicago Sky

The 2022 New York Liberty season was the 26th season for the New York Liberty franchise of the WNBA. The Liberty opened the regular season on May 7, 2022, versus the Connecticut Sun.

Ahead of the season, the Liberty parted ways with head coach Walt Hopkins on December 6, 2021, after two years with the team. On January 7, 2022, the Liberty announced the hiring of new head coach Sandy Brondello

On May 3, 2022, the Liberty announced that 1st Round draft pick Nyara Sabally had undergone a successful Osteochondral Autograft Transplantation and would miss the entire 2022 season.

The Liberty won their first game of the season but their quick start did not last long. They went on a seven game losing streak after their opening day win to finish May 1–7. The Liberty were able to turn things around in June, finishing the month 7–4 and seeming to develop a pattern of winning two games and then losing one. That pattern occurred three times in the month. That streak did not last into July as the team went 3–7 in the month and had a six game losing streak. To finish an up-and-down season, they went 5–2 in August and secured the seventh seed in the 2022 WNBA Playoffs with a 16–20 overall record. Their sixteen regular season wins was the franchise's most since they won twenty two games in 2017.

As the seventh seed, the Liberty were matched up against the second seed Chicago Sky in the first round of the playoffs, with Chicago having home court advantage. That advantage did not last long as the Liberty won the opening game of the series 98–91. The Liberty wouldn't build on that momentum and lost the next two games, including the series decider at home, by a combined fifty-six points.

== Transactions ==
=== WNBA draft ===
Round	Pick	Player	Nationality	School/team/country
1	5	Nyara Sabally	Germany	Oregon
3	29	Sika Koné	Mali	CB Islas Canarias (Spain)

=== Trades and Roster Changes ===
Date	Transaction
December 6, 2021	Parted ways with head coach Walt Hopkins
December 31, 2021	Renounced the rights to Olcay Cakir
January 7, 2022	Hired Sandy Brondello as head coach
January 11, 2022	Extended Qualifying Offers to Nayo Raincock-Ekunwe and Paris Kea
January 14, 2022	Signed Paris Kea to the Qualifying Offer
February 3, 2022	Signed Stefanie Dolson to a Two-Year Deal
February 4, 2022	Waived Jazmine Jones and Leaonna Odom
February 4, 2022	Signed Rebecca Allen to a Two-Year Deal
March 16, 2022	Hired Olaf Lange, Roneeka Hodges, and Zach O'Brien as assistant coaches
April 11, 2022	Traded a 2023 Second Round Pick to the Seattle Storm for the rights to Lorela Cubaj
April 15, 2022	Signed Lorela Cubaj to a rookie-scale contract
April 27, 2022	Waived Paris Kea
May 2, 2022	Full Season Suspension of the contract for Kylee Shook for personal reasons
May 5, 2022	Temporarily Suspend Rebecca Allen due to Overseas Commitments
May 6, 2022	Signed Kaila Charles to a Hardship Contract
May 8, 2022	Released Kaila Charles from her Hardship Contract
May 15, 2022	Exercised the 4th Year Team Option on Sabrina Ionescu
May 16, 2022	Exercised the 4th Year Team Option on Jocelyn Willoughby
May 17, 2022	Activated Rebecca Allen from her Temporary Suspension
May 21, 2022	Signed Crystal Dangerfield to a Hardship Contract
June 8, 2022	Traded AD to the Atlanta Dream in exchange for Megan Walker and the rights to Raquel Carrera
June 8, 2022	Waived Megan Walker
June 8, 2022	Signed Marine Johannès
June 8, 2022	Released Crystal Dangerfield from her Hardship Contract
June 9, 2022	Signed Crystal Dangerfield to a Hardship Contract
June 26, 2022	Released Crystal Dangerfield from her Hardship Contract
July 1, 2022	Waived Lorela Cubaj
July 3, 2022	Signed Crystal Dangerfield

== Roster ==
2022 New York Liberty roster
Players
Coaches

Pos.	No.	Nat.	Name	Height	Weight	DOB	From	Yrs
G/F	9	(Australia)	Allen, Rebecca	6' 2" (1.88m)	162 lb (73kg)	1992-11-06	Australia	6
G	3	(United States)	Dangerfield, Crystal	5' 5" (1.65m)	130 lb (59kg)	1998-05-11	Connecticut	1
C	31	(United States)	Dolson, Stefanie	6' 5" (1.96m)	235 lb (107kg)	1992-01-08	Connecticut	8
F	6	(United States)	Howard, Natasha	6' 2" (1.88m)	165 lb (75kg)	1991-09-02	Florida State	8
G	20	(United States)	Ionescu, Sabrina	5' 11" (1.8m)	165 lb (75kg)	1997-12-06	Oregon	2
G	23	(France)	Johannès, Marine	5' 10" (1.78m)	134 lb (61kg)	1995-01-21	France	1
G/F	44	(United States)	Laney, Betnijah	6' 0" (1.83m)	166 lb (75kg)	1993-10-29	Rutgers	6
F	12	(United States)	Onyenwere, Michaela	6' 0" (1.83m)	178 lb (81kg)	1999-08-10	UCLA	1
G/F	2	(United States)	Richards, DiDi	6' 2" (1.88m)	164 lb (74kg)	1999-02-08	Baylor	1
G	32	(Australia)	Whitcomb, Sami	5' 10" (1.78m)	145 lb (66kg)	1988-07-20	Washington	5
G/F	13	(United States)	Willoughby, Jocelyn	6' 0" (1.83m)	180 lb (82kg)	1998-03-25	Virginia	1
C	21	(China)	Xu, Han	6' 10" (2.08m)	193 lb (88kg)	1999-10-31	China	1

Head coach
(Australia) Sandy Brondello (Western Sydney)
Assistant coaches
(Germany) Olaf Lange
(United States) Roneeka Hodges (Florida State)
(United States) Zach O'Brien
Athletic trainer
(United States) Terri Acosta
Strength and conditioning coach
(United States) Emily Zaler

Legend

- (C) Team captain
- (DP) Unsigned draft pick
- (FA) Free agent
- (S) Suspended
- Injured

=== Depth ===
Pos.	Starter	Bench
C	Stefanie Dolson	Han Xu
PF	Natasha Howard	Michaela Onyenwere
SF	Betnijah Laney	Rebecca Allen; Jocelyn Willoughby
SG	Sabrina Ionescu	Marine Johannès; DiDi Richards
PG	Crystal Dangerfield	Sami Whitcomb

== Schedule ==
=== Preseason ===
2022 pre-season game log
April: 0–0 (Home: 0–0; Road: 0–0)

Game	Date	Team	Score	High points	High rebounds	High assists	Location Attendance	Record
1	April 30	Washington	Canceled				Barclays Center	0–0

2022 pre-season schedule

=== Regular Season ===
2022 game log
Total: 16–20 (Home: 9–9; Road: 7–11)
May: 1–7 (Home: 1–3; Road: 0–4)

Game	Date	Team	Score	High points	High rebounds	High assists	Location Attendance	Record
1	May 7	Connecticut	W 81–79	Sabrina Ionescu (25)	Natasha Howard (6)	Sabrina Ionescu (6)	Barclays Center; 6,829	1–0
2	May 11	@ Chicago	L 50–83	Han Xu (10)	Dolson; Ionescu (6)	Betnijah Laney (6)	Wintrust Arena; 4,935	1–1
3	May 13	Indiana	L 86–92 (OT)	Sabrina Ionescu (31)	Natasha Howard (9)	Sabrina Ionescu (7)	Barclays Center; 3,289	1–2
4	May 15	Dallas	L 71–81	Sabrina Ionescu (17)	Natasha Howard (8)	Sabrina Ionescu (6)	Barclays Center; 3,095	1–3
5	May 17	Connecticut	L 65–92	Betnijah Laney (16)	Stefanie Dolson (7)	Sabrina Ionescu (4)	Barclays Center; 3,054	1–4
6	May 24	@ Minnesota	L 78–84	Natasha Howard (23)	Sabrina Ionescu (9)	Sami Whitcomb (9)	Target Center; 6,104	1–5
7	May 27	@ Seattle	L 71–79	Natasha Howard (19)	Natasha Howard (9)	Sami Whitcomb (8)	Climate Pledge Arena; 10,001	1–6
8	May 29	@ Seattle	L 61–92	Han Xu (13)	Han Xu (8)	Sabrina Ionescu (4)	Climate Pledge Arena; 10,228	1–7

June : 7–4 (Home: 3–4; Road: 4–0)

Game	Date	Team	Score	High points	High rebounds	High assists	Location Attendance	Record
9	June 1	Indiana	W 87–74	Sabrina Ionescu (23)	Stefanie Dolson (8)	Stefanie Dolson (7)	Barclays Center; 4,079	2–7
10	June 3	@ Washington	W 74–70	Sabrina Ionescu (24)	Stefanie Dolson (8)	Crystal Dangerfield (4)	Entertainment and Sports Arena; 3,857	3–7
11	June 5	Minnesota	L 77–84	Sabrina Ionescu (31)	Michaela Onyenwere (6)	Sabrina Ionescu (7)	Barclays Center; 4,119	3–8
12	June 7	Minnesota	W 88–69	Sabrina Ionescu (26)	Sabrina Ionescu (8)	Sabrina Ionescu (8)	Barclays Center; 3,196	4–8
13	June 10	@ Indiana	W 97–83	Natasha Howard (25)	Natasha Howard (10)	Sabrina Ionescu (7)	Indiana Farmers Coliseum; 1,393	5–8
14	June 12	Chicago	L 86–88	Sabrina Ionescu (27)	Sabrina Ionescu (13)	Sabrina Ionescu (12)	Barclays Center; 4,810	5–9
15	June 16	Washington	W 77–65	Natasha Howard (27)	Natasha Howard (9)	Sabrina Ionescu (9)	Barclays Center; 4,168	6–9
16	June 19	Seattle	L 72–81	Marine Johannès (23)	Natasha Howard (11)	Sabrina Ionescu (10)	Barclays Center; 6,859	6–10
17	June 22	@ Connecticut	W 81–77	Stefanie Dolson (16)	Sabrina Ionescu (11)	Sabrina Ionescu (6)	Mohegan Sun; 4,652	7–10
18	June 24	@ Atlanta	W 89–77	Sabrina Ionescu (21)	Natasha Howard (10)	Sabrina Ionescu (8)	Gateway Center Arena; 2,697	8–10
19	June 30	Atlanta	L 81–92 (OT)	Stefanie Dolson (20)	Sabrina Ionescu (13)	Sabrina Ionescu (7)	Barclays Center; 6,161	8–11

July : 3–7 (Home: 2–2; Road: 1–5)

Game	Date	Team	Score	High points	High rebounds	High assists	Location Attendance	Record
20	July 3	@ Los Angeles	L 74–84	Marine Johannès (17)	Sabrina Ionescu (9)	Sabrina Ionescu (8)	Crypto.com Arena; 5,436	8–12
21	July 6	@ Las Vegas	W 116–107	Sabrina Ionescu (31)	Sabrina Ionescu (13)	Sabrina Ionescu (10)	Michelob Ultra Arena; 8,405	9–12
22	July 7	@ Phoenix	L 81–84	Sabrina Ionescu (22)	Sabrina Ionescu (10)	Marine Johannès (6)	Footprint Center; 6,158	9–13
23	July 12	Las Vegas	L 101–107	Sabrina Ionescu (27)	Natasha Howard (11)	Ionescu; Johannès (5)	Barclays Center; 5,201	9–14
24	July 14	Las Vegas	L 74–108	Natasha Howard (19)	Natasha Howard (9)	Sabrina Ionescu (6)	Barclays Center; 9,896	9–15
25	July 19	@ Connecticut	L 63–82	Sabrina Ionescu (13)	Stefanie Dolson (6)	Sabrina Ionescu (4)	Mohegan Sun Arena; 6,288	9–16
26	July 21	@ Washington	L 69–78	Natasha Howard (17)	Natasha Howard (10)	Crystal Dangerfield (5)	Capital One Arena; 7,431	9–17
27	July 23	Chicago	W 83–80	Sabrina Ionescu (17)	Natasha Howard (10)	Sabrina Ionescu (9)	Barclays Center; 6,926	10–17
28	July 29	@ Chicago	L 81–89	Sabrina Ionescu (16)	Natasha Howard (10)	Sabrina Ionescu (6)	Wintrust Arena; 6,924	10–18
29	July 31	Phoenix	W 89–69	Natasha Howard (23)	Natasha Howard (12)	Sabrina Ionescu (16)	Barclays Center; 6,433	11–18

August : 5–2 (Home: 3–0; Road: 2–2)

Game	Date	Team	Score	High points	High rebounds	High assists	Location Attendance	Record
30	August 2	Los Angeles	W 102–73	Sabrina Ionescu (31)	Natasha Howard (11)	Han Xu (8)	Barclays Center; 4,891	12–18
31	August 3	Los Angeles	W 64–61	Sabrina Ionescu (20)	Dolson; Ionescu (8)	Sabrina Ionescu (6)	Barclays Center; 5,315	13–18
32	August 6	@ Phoenix	L 62–76	Sabrina Ionescu (20)	Stefanie Dolson (7)	Sabrina Ionescu (5)	Footprint Center; 11,724	13–19
33	August 8	@ Dallas	L 77–86	Sabrina Ionescu (32)	Sabrina Ionescu (7)	Sabrina Ionescu (4)	College Park Center; 3,036	13–20
34	August 10	@ Dallas	W 91–73	Sami Whitcomb (15)	Sabrina Ionescu (9)	Sabrina Ionescu (7)	College Park Center; 3,795	14–20
35	August 12	@ Atlanta	W 80–70	Crystal Dangerfield (18)	Natasha Howard (12)	Dangerfield; Ionescu (6)	Gateway Center Arena; 3,138	15–20
36	August 14	Atlanta	W 87–83	N. Howard; Johannes (18)	Stefanie Dolson (12)	Sabrina Ionescu (7)	Barclays Center; 7,561	16–20

2022 season schedule

=== Playoffs ===
2022 playoff game log
First round vs. Chicago Sky
Lost Series: 1–2

Game	Date	Team	Score	High points	High rebounds	High assists	Location Attendance	Series
1	August 17	@ Chicago	W 98–91	N. Howard; Ionescu (22)	Dolson; N. Howard; Ionescu (7)	Marine Johannès (7)	Wintrust Arena; 7,524	1–0
2	August 20	@ Chicago	L 62–100	Onyenwere; Xu (10)	Ionescu; Xu (5)	Dolson; Ionescu; Laney; Whitcomb (3)	Wintrust Arena; 7,732	1–1
3	August 23	Chicago	L 72–90	Betnijah Laney (15)	Natasha Howard (11)	Ionescu; Johannès (4)	Barclays Center; 7,837	1–2

2022 playoff schedule

== Standings ==
#	Team	W	L	PCT	GB	Conf.	Home	Road	Cup
1	x – Las Vegas Aces	26	10	.722	–	15–3	13–5	13–5	9–1
2	x – Chicago Sky	26	10	.722	–	15–3	14–4	12–6	9–1
3	x – Connecticut Sun	25	11	.694	1.0	11–7	13–5	12–6	5–5
4	x – Seattle Storm	22	14	.611	4.0	10–8	13–5	9–9	6–4
5	x – Washington Mystics	22	14	.611	4.0	11–7	12–6	10–8	5–5
6	x – Dallas Wings	18	18	.500	8.0	8–10	8–10	10–8	5–5
7	x – New York Liberty	16	20	.444	10.0	10–8	9–9	7–11	6–4
8	x – Phoenix Mercury	15	21	.417	11.0	7–11	11–7	4–14	3–7
9	e – Minnesota Lynx	14	22	.389	12.0	8–10	7–11	7–11	4–6
10	e – Atlanta Dream	14	22	.389	12.0	5–13	8–10	6–12	3–7
11	e – Los Angeles Sparks	13	23	.361	13.0	6–12	7–11	6–12	3–7
12	e – Indiana Fever	5	31	.139	21.0	2–16	3–15	2–16	2–8

Notes

(#) – League Standing
x – Clinched playoff berth
e – Eliminated from playoff contention
Source: Overall standings and Commissioner's Cup Standings

== Playoffs ==
**First round** Best-of-3
**1**	**Las Vegas Aces**	**2**
8	Phoenix Mercury	0
**4**	**Seattle Storm**	**2**
5	Washington Mystics	0
**2**	**Chicago Sky**	**2**
7	New York Liberty	1
**3**	**Connecticut Sun**	**2**
6	Dallas Wings	1

**Semifinals**; Best-of-5
**1**	**Las Vegas Aces**	**3**
4	Seattle Storm	1
2	Chicago Sky	2
**3**	**Connecticut Sun**	**3**

**Finals**; Best-of-5
**1**	**Las Vegas Aces**	**3**
3	Connecticut Sun	1

- **Bold** – Series winner
- Italic – Team with home-court advantage

== Statistics ==
Legend
GP	Games played	GS	Games started	MPG	Minutes per game	RPG	Rebounds per game
APG	Assists per game	SPG	Steals per game	BPG	Blocks per game	PPG	Points per game
FG%	Field-goal percentage	3P%	3-point field-goal percentage	FT%	Free-throw percentage	TO	Turnovers per game
PF	Fouls per game		Team leader		League leader

=== Regular Season ===
Player	GP	GS	MPG	FG%	3P%	FT%	RPG	APG	SPG	BPG	PPG
Sabrina Ionescu	36	36	32.3	.411	.333	.931	7.1	6.3	1.1	0.3	17.4
Natasha Howard	35	35	29.9	.482	.326	.715	7.3	2.3	1.3	1.0	15.1
Betnijah Laney	9	6	28.3	.422	.379	.875	3.3	2.8	0.4	0.1	11.2
Marine Johannès	24	10	25.5	.464	.437	.870	1.7	3.4	0.6	0.1	10.0
Han Xu	32	0	16.8	.493	.444	.796	3.6	0.9	0.5	0.7	8.5
Stefanie Dolson	36	36	22.9	.493	.394	.905	4.8	1.8	0.4	0.8	8.1
Rebecca Allen	25	19	20.9	.379	.313	.833	3.4	1.2	0.8	1.0	7.0
Sami Whitcomb	35	6	21.3	.366	.351	.870	2.4	2.3	0.7	0.1	6.5
Crystal Dangerfield^{≠}	30	27	22.1	.395	.323	.700	2.1	2.5	0.6	0.1	5.4
Michaela Onyenwere	34	1	13.7	.377	.300	.836	2.1	0.4	0.4	0.2	4.7
Jocelyn Willoughby	11	4	11.0	.423	.273	.500	1.6	0.4	0.5	0.2	2.6
DiDi Richards	14	0	11.1	.306	.273	.700	1.7	1.4	0.1	0.4	2.3
AD Durr^{†}	10	0	7.0	.176	.111	.875	0.1	0.4	0.4	0.2	1.4
Lorela Cubaj^{‡}	11	0	8.0	.333	.000	.000	2.1	0.4	0.0	0.2	0.7

^{‡}Waived/Released during the season
^{†}Traded during the season
^{≠}Acquired during the season

=== Playoffs ===
Player	GP	GS	MPG	FG%	3P%	FT%	RPG	APG	SPG	BPG	PPG
Natasha Howard	3	3	27.7	.442	.100	1.000	6.7	1.0	0.7	0.0	14.7
Sabrina Ionescu	3	3	31.0	.531	.400	.750	6.0	4.3	1.0	0.3	14.3
Betnijah Laney	3	3	24.3	.419	.250	.875	4.0	3.3	0.7	0.3	11.3
Stefanie Dolson	3	3	26.3	.444	.600	.000	3.7	2.7	0.0	1.0	6.3
Marine Johannès	3	1	23.0	.429	.400	1.000	2.3	4.3	1.7	0.0	5.7
Han Xu	3	0	10.0	.417	1.000	.833	2.7	0.3	0.0	0.7	5.3
Michaela Onyenwere	3	0	7.3	.364	.000	1.000	1.3	0.0	0.0	0.0	4.7
Rebecca Allen	3	0	16.3	.286	.167	1.000	3.0	1.3	0.7	0.3	4.3
DiDi Richards	2	0	8.5	.400	.000	1.000	1.5	1.0	1.0	0.0	4.0
Sami Whitcomb	3	0	14.7	.364	.429	.000	0.3	2.0	1.0	0.0	3.7
Jocelyn Willoughby	2	0	7.0	1.000	.000	.667	0.5	0.0	0.0	0.0	3.0
Crystal Dangerfield	3	2	9.0	.273	.250	.000	0.3	0.3	0.0	0.0	2.3

== Awards and honors ==
Recipient	Award	Date awarded	Ref.
Sabrina Ionescu	Eastern Conference Player of the Week	June 13	
Sabrina Ionescu	Eastern Conference Player of the Week	July 8	
Sabrina Ionescu	Eastern Conference Player of the Week	August 8	
Sabrina Ionescu	Eastern Conference Player of the Week	August 15	
Sabrina Ionescu	WNBA All-Star Starter	June 22	
Sabrina Ionescu	Eastern Conference Player of the Month - June	July 5	
Sabrina Ionescu	Eastern Conference Player of the Month - August	August 16	
Sabrina Ionescu	All-WNBA Second Team	September 15	
Natasha Howard	WNBA All-Star Selection	June 28	
