= 2022 Seattle Storm season =

23rd season in the Women's National Basketball Association

- Head coach: Noelle Quinn
- Arena: Climate Pledge Arena

Results
- Record: 22–14 (.611)
- Place: 2nd (Western)
- Playoff finish: 4th seed; Lost in Semifinals to Las Vegas Aces

The 2022 Seattle Storm season was the franchise's 23rd season in the Women's National Basketball Association. This was the first season back in the newly renovated Climate Pledge Arena.

On June 16, 2022, Sue Bird announced that this season would be her final one and that she would be retiring after the season.

The Storm started the season with an opening day win, but went on to lose their next three games. They turned their fortunes around after the three game losing streak, and went on a four-game winning streak to end the month of May 5–3. June started with two straight losses, but then the team won four games straight. They won three of their last five games to finish June 7–4. They started July strong, losing one of their first six games in the month. The end of the month saw the team only get two wins out of six games, with five of those six games being on the road. They finished July 7–5 and clinched a playoff spot on July 30. The Storm went 3–2 in August, with their only two losses coming to the first place Las Vegas Aces. They finished the season 22–14, tied for fourth with Washington. They were awarded the 4th seed based on having a better regular season record vs. Washington.

In their First Round series, the Storm had home court advantage as the fourth seed, and faced off against the fifth seeded Washington Mystics. The Storm won a close game one 86–83. They took advantage of their home court and won game two by thirteen points, to sweep the series. In the Semifinals, they were up against the first seeded Aces. The Storm won another close game one, 76–73 in Las Vegas. However, they would go on to lose the next three games and lose the series three games to one. Most of the games in the series were close, with game two being decided by four points, game three going into overtime, and game four being decided by five points.

== Transactions ==
=== WNBA draft ===
Round	Pick	Player	Nationality	School/team/country
2	17	Elissa Cunane	United States	NC State
2	18	Lorela Cubaj	Italy	Georgia Tech
2	21	Evina Westbrook	United States	UConn
3	33	Jade Melbourne	Australia	Canberra Capitals (Australia)

=== Trades and Roster Changes ===
Date	Transaction
January 4, 2022	Extended Qualifying Offers to Stephanie Talbot, Jordin Canada, and Mercedes Russell
January 14, 2022	Extended a Core Qualifying Offer to Jewell Loyd
January 21, 2022	Hired Pokey Chatman and Ebony Hoffman as assistant coaches
February 1, 2022	Re-Signed Jewell Loyd to a Two-Year Deal
February 1, 2022	Re-Signed Mercedes Russell to a Three-Year Deal
February 2, 2022	Re-Signed Breanna Stewart to a One-Year Deal
February 2, 2022	Signed Briann January to a One-Year Deal
February 3, 2022	Traded Katie Lou Samuelson and the 9th pick in the 2022 WNBA draft to Los Angeles in exchange for Gabby Williams.
February 4, 2022	Signed Stephanie Talbot to a training-camp contract
February 5, 2022	Rescinded the Qualifying Offer to Jordin Canada
February 18, 2022	Signed Sue Bird to a One-Year Deal
February 24, 2022	Signed Lauren Manis to a training-camp contract
March 21, 2022	Signed Jantel Lavender to a training-camp contract
April 11, 2022	Traded the rights to Lorela Cubaj to the New York Liberty in exchange for a 2nd Round Pick in the 2023 Draft
April 14, 2022	Signed Elissa Cunane and Evina Westbrook to rookie-scale contracts
April 14, 2022	Signed Paisley Harding, Jenna Giacone, and Raina Perez to training-camp contracts
April 26, 2022	Waived Lauren Manis
April 30, 2022	Waived Paisley Harding and Jenna Giacone
May 2, 2022	Signed Reshanda Gray to a training-camp contract
May 2, 2022	Waived Elissa Cunane and Raina Perez
May 4, 2022	Waived Evina Westbrook, Mikiah Herbert Harrigan, and Kennedy Burke
May 11, 2022	Signed Raina Perez to a Hardship Contract
May 13, 2022	Signed Kaela Davis to a Hardship Contract
May 16, 2022	Released Raina Perez from her Hardship Contract
May 18, 2022	Released Kaela Davis from her Hardship Contract
May 27, 2022	Signed Kiana Williams to a Hardship Contract
May 28, 2022	Signed Kaela Davis to a Hardship Contract
June 2, 2022	Released Kiana Williams and Kaela Davis from their Hardship Contracts
June 3, 2022	Signed Kiana Williams to a Hardship Contract
June 4, 2022	Released Kiana Williams from her Hardship Contract
June 24, 2022	Waived Reshanda Gray
June 28, 2022	Signed Tina Charles

== Roster ==
2022 Seattle Storm roster
Players
Coaches

Pos.	No.	Nat.	Name	Height	Weight	DOB	From	Yrs
G	10	(United States)	Bird, Sue	5' 9" (1.75m)	150 lb (68kg)	1980-10-16	Connecticut	18
C	31	(United States)	Charles, Tina	6' 4" (1.93m)	192 lb (87kg)	1988-12-05	Connecticut	12
G	20	(United States)	January, Briann	5' 8" (1.73m)	148 lb (67kg)	1987-01-11	Arizona State	13
F	14	(United States)	Lavender, Jantel	6' 4" (1.93m)	185 lb (84kg)	1988-11-12	Ohio State	10
G	24	(United States)	Loyd, Jewell	5' 10" (1.78m)	148 lb (67kg)	1993-10-05	Notre Dame	7
C	13	(Australia)	Magbegor, Ezi	6' 4" (1.93m)	176 lb (80kg)	1999-08-13	Australia	2
G	11	(Russia)	Prince, Epiphanny	5' 9" (1.75m)	179 lb (81kg)	1988-01-11	Rutgers	12
C	21	(United States)	Russell, Mercedes (injured)	6' 6" (1.98m)	195 lb (88kg)	1995-07-27	Tennessee	4
F	30	(United States)	Stewart, Breanna	6' 4" (1.93m)	170 lb (77kg)	1994-08-27	Connecticut	5
F	7	(Australia)	Talbot, Stephanie	6' 2" (1.88m)	192 lb (87kg)	1994-06-15	Australia	4
F	5	(France)	Williams, Gabby	5' 11" (1.8m)	172 lb (78kg)	1996-09-09	Connecticut	3

Head coach
(United States) / (Bulgaria) Noelle Quinn (UCLA)
Assistant coaches
(United States) Pokey Chatman (LSU)
(United States) Ebony Hoffman (USC)
(United States) Perry Huang (Fresno Pacific)
Athletic trainer
Caroline Durocher

Legend

- (C) Team captain
- (DP) Unsigned draft pick
- (FA) Free agent
- (S) Suspended
- Injured

=== Depth ===
Pos.	Starter	Bench
C	Tina Charles	Ezi Magbegor; Mercedes Russell
PF	Breanna Stewart	Jantel Lavender
SF	Gabby Williams	Stephanie Talbot
SG	Jewell Loyd	Epiphanny Prince
PG	Sue Bird	Briann January

== Schedule ==
=== Preseason ===
2022 pre-season game log
Total: 2–0 (Home: 1–0; Road: 1–0)
April: 2–0 (Home: 1–0; Road: 1–0)

Game	Date	Team	Score	High points	High rebounds	High assists	Location Attendance	Record
1	April 23	Los Angeles	W 81–68	Breanna Stewart (20)	Ezi Magbegor (8)	Breanna Stewart (4)	Climate Pledge Arena; 5,734	1–0
2	April 28	@ Phoenix	W 82–78	Breanna Stewart (16)	Breanna Stewart (7)	Bird; Stewart (4)	Footprint Center; 2,759	2–0

2022 pre-season schedule

=== Regular season ===
2022 game log
Total: 22–14 (Home: 13–5; Road: 9–9)
May: 5–3 (Home: 5–1; Road: 0–2)

Game	Date	Team	Score	High points	High rebounds	High assists	Location Attendance	Record
1	May 6	Minnesota	W 97–74	Loyd; Stewart (17)	Breanna Stewart (8)	Sue Bird (9)	Climate Pledge Arena; 12,904	1–0
2	May 8	@ Las Vegas	L 74–85	Breanna Stewart (21)	Breanna Stewart (8)	Sue Bird (7)	Michelob Ultra Arena; 6,212	1–1
3	May 11	@ Phoenix	L 77–97	Jewell Loyd (26)	Lavender; Loyd; Magbegor; Williams (5)	Sue Bird (6)	Footprint Center; 6,098	1–2
4	May 14	Phoenix	L 64–69	Jewell Loyd (26)	Stephanie Talbot (14)	Bird; Loyd; Talbot (3)	Climate Pledge Arena; 12,453	1–3
5	May 18	Chicago	W 74–71	Ezi Magbegor (21)	Stephanie Talbot (7)	Sue Bird (7)	Climate Pledge Arena; 7,450	2–3
6	May 20	Los Angeles	W 83–80	Breanna Stewart (28)	Ezi Magbegor (11)	Sue Bird (8)	Climate Pledge Arena; 10,103	3–3
7	May 27	New York	W 79–71	Breanna Stewart (31)	Lavender; Stewart; Williams (9)	Prince; Stewart (4)	Climate Pledge Arena; 10,001	4–3
8	May 29	New York	W 92–61	Jewell Loyd (22)	Jantel Lavender (10)	Jewell Loyd (6)	Climate Pledge Arena; 10,228	5–3

June : 7–4 (Home: 3–3; Road: 4–1)

Game	Date	Team	Score	High points	High rebounds	High assists	Location Attendance	Record
9	June 3	Dallas	L 51–68	Breanna Stewart (27)	Breanna Stewart (8)	Briann January (7)	Climate Pledge Arena; 8,023	5–4
10	June 5	Connecticut	L 86–93	Ezi Magbegor (19)	Ezi Magbegor (7)	Jewell Loyd (7)	Climate Pledge Arena; 11,330	5–5
11	June 7	Atlanta	W 72–60	Jewell Loyd (26)	Magbegor; Stewart (7)	Sue Bird (6)	Climate Pledge Arena; 7,262	6–5
12	June 10	@ Dallas	W 89–88	Breanna Stewart (32)	Breanna Stewart (11)	Gabby Williams (9)	College Park Center; 3,292	7–5
13	June 12	@ Dallas	W 84–79	Breanna Stewart (25)	Breanna Stewart (8)	Sue Bird (7)	College Park Center; 3,273	8–5
14	June 14	@ Minnesota	W 81–79	Breanna Stewart (29)	Gabby Williams (10)	Gabby Williams (8)	Target Center; 6,031	9–5
15	June 17	@ Connecticut	L 71–82	Breanna Stewart (19)	Breanna Stewart (7)	Breanna Stewart (5)	Mohegan Sun Arena; 7,088	9–6
16	June 19	@ New York	W 81–72	Gabby Williams (23)	Stewart; Williams (9)	Jewell Loyd (7)	Barclays Center; 6,859	10–6
17	June 23	Washington	W 85–71	Jewell Loyd (22)	Breanna Stewart (9)	Sue Bird (8)	Climate Pledge Arena; 9,884	11–6
18	June 25	Los Angeles	L 77–85	Breanna Stewart (28)	Breanna Stewart (7)	Sue Bird (6)	Climate Pledge Arena; 9,955	11–7
19	June 29	Las Vegas	W 88–78	Jewell Loyd (24)	Ezi Magbegor (8)	Sue Bird (6)	Climate Pledge Arena; 9,499	12–7

July : 7–5 (Home: 4–0; Road: 3–5)

Game	Date	Team	Score	High points	High rebounds	High assists	Location Attendance	Record
20	July 1	Indiana	W 73–57	Breanna Stewart (20)	Tina Charles (8)	Jewell Loyd (7)	Climate Pledge Arena; 8,565	13–7
21	July 3	@ Atlanta	L 76–90	Breanna Stewart (19)	Ezi Magbegor (7)	January; Prince (4)	Gateway Center Arena; 3,138	13–8
22	July 5	@ Indiana	W 95–73	Jewell Loyd (25)	Ezi Magbegor (11)	Sue Bird (5)	Indiana Farmers Coliseum; 2,585	14–8
23	July 7	@ Los Angeles	W 106–69	Breanna Stewart (23)	Ezi Magbegor (11)	Jewell Loyd (7)	Crypto.com Arena; 6,389	15–8
24	July 12	Dallas	W 83–74	Breanna Stewart (19)	Tina Charles (9)	Sue Bird (7)	Climate Pledge Arena; 9,486	16–8
25	July 17	Indiana	W 81–65	Breanna Stewart (25)	Stewart; Williams (8)	Sue Bird (6)	Climate Pledge Arena; 9,970	17–8
26	July 20	@ Chicago	L 74–78	Breanna Stewart (24)	Charles; Williams (6)	Bird; Loyd (4)	Wintrust Arena; 8,893	17–9
27	July 22	@ Phoenix	L 78–94	Breanna Stewart (22)	Breanna Stewart (14)	Bird; Loyd; Williams (5)	Footprint Center; 14,162	17–10
28	July 24	Atlanta	W 82–72	Tina Charles (27)	Tina Charles (15)	Sue Bird (5)	Climate Pledge Arena; 12,654	18–10
29	July 28	@ Connecticut	L 83–88	Breanna Stewart (17)	Tina Charles (10)	Sue Bird (7)	Mohegan Sun Arena; 9,137	18–11
30	July 30	@ Washington	W 82–77	Breanna Stewart (18)	Tina Charles (9)	Sue Bird (7)	Entertainment and Sports Arena; 4,200	19–11
31	July 31	@ Washington	L 75–78	Breanna Stewart (23)	Charles; Stewart (5)	Sue Bird (7)	Entertainment and Sports Arena; 4,200	19–12

August : 3–2 (Home: 1–1; Road: 2–1)

Game	Date	Team	Score	High points	High rebounds	High assists	Location Attendance	Record
32	August 3	Minnesota	W 89–77	Breanna Stewart (33)	Breanna Stewart (8)	Sue Bird (6)	Climate Pledge Arena; 13,500	20–12
33	August 7	Las Vegas	L 81–89	Breanna Stewart (35)	Breanna Stewart (10)	Bird; G. Williams (6)	Climate Pledge Arena; 18,100	20–13
34	August 9	@ Chicago	W 111–100	Breanna Stewart (25)	Breanna Stewart (9)	Sue Bird (8)	Wintrust Arena; 9,314	21–13
35	August 12	@ Minnesota	W 96–69	Tina Charles (23)	Breanna Stewart (10)	Gabby Williams (7)	Target Center; 12,134	22–13
36	August 14	@ Las Vegas	L 100–109	Jewell Loyd (38)	Breanna Stewart (15)	Sue Bird (7)	Michelob Ultra Arena; 10,015	22–14

2022 season schedule

=== Playoffs ===
2022 playoff game log
First Round vs. Washington Mystics
Won Series: 2–0

Game	Date	Team	Score	High points	High rebounds	High assists	Location Attendance	Series
1	August 18	Washington	W 86–83	Breanna Stewart (23)	Breanna Stewart (12)	Gabby Williams (6)	Climate Pledge Arena; 8,917	1–0
2	August 21	Washington	W 97–84	Breanna Stewart (21)	Breanna Stewart (10)	Sue Bird (10)	Climate Pledge Arena; 12,490	2–0

Semifinals vs. Las Vegas Aces
Lost Series: 1–3

Game	Date	Team	Score	High points	High rebounds	High assists	Location Attendance	Series
1	August 28	@ Las Vegas	W 76–73	Jewell Loyd (26)	Tina Charles (18)	Sue Bird (12)	Michelob Ultra Arena; 9,944	1–0
2	August 31	@ Las Vegas	L 73–78	Breanna Stewart (32)	Tina Charles (9)	Sue Bird (6)	Michelob Ultra Arena; 9,755	1–1
3	September 4	Las Vegas	L 98–110 (OT)	Breanna Stewart (20)	Breanna Stewart (15)	Sue Bird (8)	Climate Pledge Arena; 15,431	1–2
4	September 6	Las Vegas	L 92–97	Breanna Stewart (42)	Tina Charles (9)	Sue Bird (8)	Climate Pledge Arena; 11,328	1–3

2022 playoff schedule

== Standings ==
#	Team	W	L	PCT	GB	Conf.	Home	Road	Cup
1	x – Las Vegas Aces	26	10	.722	–	15–3	13–5	13–5	9–1
2	x – Chicago Sky	26	10	.722	–	15–3	14–4	12–6	9–1
3	x – Connecticut Sun	25	11	.694	1.0	11–7	13–5	12–6	5–5
4	x – Seattle Storm	22	14	.611	4.0	10–8	13–5	9–9	6–4
5	x – Washington Mystics	22	14	.611	4.0	11–7	12–6	10–8	5–5
6	x – Dallas Wings	18	18	.500	8.0	8–10	8–10	10–8	5–5
7	x – New York Liberty	16	20	.444	10.0	10–8	9–9	7–11	6–4
8	x – Phoenix Mercury	15	21	.417	11.0	7–11	11–7	4–14	3–7
9	e – Minnesota Lynx	14	22	.389	12.0	8–10	7–11	7–11	4–6
10	e – Atlanta Dream	14	22	.389	12.0	5–13	8–10	6–12	3–7
11	e – Los Angeles Sparks	13	23	.361	13.0	6–12	7–11	6–12	3–7
12	e – Indiana Fever	5	31	.139	21.0	2–16	3–15	2–16	2–8

Notes

(#) – League Standing
x – Clinched playoff berth
e – Eliminated from playoff contention
Source: Overall standings and Commissioner's Cup Standings

== Playoffs ==
**First round** Best-of-3
**1**	**Las Vegas Aces**	**2**
8	Phoenix Mercury	0
**4**	**Seattle Storm**	**2**
5	Washington Mystics	0
**2**	**Chicago Sky**	**2**
7	New York Liberty	1
**3**	**Connecticut Sun**	**2**
6	Dallas Wings	1

**Semifinals**; Best-of-5
**1**	**Las Vegas Aces**	**3**
4	Seattle Storm	1
2	Chicago Sky	2
**3**	**Connecticut Sun**	**3**

**Finals**; Best-of-5
**1**	**Las Vegas Aces**	**3**
3	Connecticut Sun	1

- **Bold** – Series winner
- Italic – Team with home-court advantage

== Statistics ==
Legend
GP	Games played	GS	Games started	MPG	Minutes per game	RPG	Rebounds per game
APG	Assists per game	SPG	Steals per game	BPG	Blocks per game	PPG	Points per game
FG%	Field-goal percentage	3P%	3-point field-goal percentage	FT%	Free-throw percentage	TO	Turnovers per game
PF	Fouls per game		Team leader		League leader

=== Regular season ===
Player	GP	GS	MPG	FG%	3P%	FT%	RPG	APG	SPG	BPG	PPG
Breanna Stewart	34	34	30.9	.472	.379	.837	7.6	2.9	1.6	0.9	21.8
Jewell Loyd	36	36	30.3	.396	.385	.893	2.6	3.4	1.1	0.2	16.3
Tina Charles^{≠}	18	10	25.2	.477	.341	.885	7.4	1.8	0.6	0.6	12.6
Kaela Davis^{‡}	1	0	18.0	.571	.667	1.000	2.0	0.0	2.0	0.0	11.0
Ezi Magbegor	33	23	24.8	.550	.345	.736	5.6	1.4	0.9	1.8	9.5
Sue Bird	31	31	26.4	.403	.389	1.000	1.9	6.0	1.2	0.1	7.8
Gabby Williams	36	36	25.6	.444	.257	.778	5.0	3.1	1.5	0.4	7.5
Stephanie Talbot	34	1	16.1	.464	.397	.583	3.1	1.3	0.7	0.3	5.0
Epiphanny Prince	33	0	12.3	.355	.356	.840	1.0	1.8	0.6	0.1	3.9
Jantel Lavender	27	4	12.2	.409	.208	.667	3.3	0.9	0.1	0.1	3.8
Briann January	36	5	16.9	.377	.311	.826	1.0	2.4	0.6	0.2	3.7
Reshanda Gray^{‡}	11	0	7.7	.500	.667	.833	2.2	0.1	0.2	0.0	2.5
Mercedes Russell	5	0	10.8	.500	.000	.667	1.8	0.2	0.0	0.0	2.0
Kiana Williams^{‡}	3	0	9.0	.250	.250	.000	0.7	1.7	0.0	0.0	1.7
Raina Perez^{‡}	1	0	2.0	.000	.000	.000	0.0	1.0	0.0	0.0	0.0

^{‡}Waived/Released during the season
^{†}Traded during the season
^{≠}Acquired during the season

=== Playoffs ===
Player	GP	GS	MPG	FG%	3P%	FT%	RPG	APG	SPG	BPG	PPG
Breanna Stewart	6	6	38.8	.513	.520	.892	9.5	4.2	1.0	1.8	27.0
Jewell Loyd	6	6	37.0	.389	.357	.929	2.3	2.5	0.5	0.0	19.2
Tina Charles	6	6	26.2	.431	.231	.286	8.8	1.8	0.5	0.5	11.5
Sue Bird	6	6	35.7	.431	.433	1.000	2.2	7.7	0.8	0.2	10.2
Gabby Williams	4	4	25.3	.667	.333	.857	4.0	2.8	1.5	0.3	10.0
Stephanie Talbot	6	2	21.3	.448	.500	.600	4.3	1.7	0.5	0.5	6.2
Ezi Magbegor	6	0	15.5	.583	.000	.667	2.7	1.0	0.7	1.0	5.0
Briann January	6	0	7.2	.500	.000	.000	0.5	1.2	0.0	0.0	1.0
Epiphanny Prince	6	0	5.7	.200	.000	.000	0.3	0.3	0.2	0.0	0.3

== Awards and honors ==
Recipient	Award	Date awarded	Ref.
Breanna Stewart	Western Conference Player of the Week	June 13	
Breanna Stewart	WNBA All-Star Starter & Co-Captain	June 22	
Breanna Stewart	Western Conference Player of the Month - June	July 5	
Breanna Stewart	Peak Performer:Points	August 15	
Breanna Stewart	All-Defensive First Team	August 30	
Breanna Stewart	All-WNBA First Team	September 15	
Sue Bird	WNBA All-Star Starter & Co-Captain	June 22	
Jewell Loyd	WNBA All-Star Selection	June 28	
Gabby Williams	All-Defensive Second Team	August 30	
Ezi Magbegor	All-Defensive Second Team	August 30	
