= 2022 Phoenix Mercury season =

US basketball season

- Head coach: Vanessa Nygaard
- Arena: Footprint Center

Results
- Record: 15–21 (.417)
- Place: 4th (Western)
- Playoff finish: 8th seed; Lost in 1st Round to the Las Vegas Aces

The 2022 Phoenix Mercury season was the 25th season for the Phoenix Mercury of the Women's National Basketball Association. The season began on May 6, 2022, against the Las Vegas Aces and ended in the 1st round of the WNBA Playoffs against the same team. The season was marred by a number of issues, including injuries and the absence of Brittney Griner, who was detained in Russia on drug charges.

On December 6, 2021, the Mercury announced that they would not be renewing Sandy Brondello's contract and parted ways with her as head coach. On January 24, 2022, the Mercury announced that Vanessa Nygaard had been hired as Brondello's replacement.

The Mercury got off to a quick start to the season, winning two of their first three games. However, that momentum did not last as they then went on a seven game losing streak. They ended May 2–7. They were able to end their losing streak in June and win four of their first six games that month. However, they lost three and won three of their final six to end the month 7–5. July was another up and down month as the team struggled to build momentum and couldn't build a streak. They finished the month 4–5. Diana Taurasi suffered a quad strain during their game against the Connecticut Sun on August 2. The Mercury announced that she would miss the rest of the regular season with the injury. On August 11, 2022, the Mercury announced that Skylar Diggins-Smith would miss the final 3 games of the season for personal reasons. Despite injuries to two of their prominent players, the Mercury entered the final day of the season with a chance at qualifying for the playoffs. Despite a final day loss and a 2–4 August record, the Mercury finished in eighth place in the standings and qualified for the final playoff spot.

The Mercury faced first seed Las Vegas in First Round of the playoffs. The first two games of the series were in Las Vegas and the Mercury lost both games, preventing the series from returning to Phoenix. Neither game was close with the Mercury losing by sixteen points in Game One and thirty-seven points in Game Two.

== Transactions ==
=== WNBA draft ===
Round	Pick	Player	Nationality	School/team/country
3	26	Maya Dodson	United States	Notre Dame
3	32	Macee Williams	United States	IUPUI

=== Trades and Roster Changes ===
Date	Transaction
December 6, 2021	Parted Ways with Head coach Sandy Brondello
January 11, 2022	Extended a Qualifying Offer to Shey Peddy
January 13, 2022	Sign Shey Peddy to a Qualifying Offer
January 13, 2022	Waived Megan Walker
January 13, 2022	Extended a Qualifying Offer to Kia Nurse
January 24, 2022	Hired Vanessa Nygaard as Head coach
January 31, 2022	Traded Kia Vaughn to the Atlanta Dream in exchange for a 2023 Third Round Pick
February 1, 2022	Re-Signed Sophie Cunningham to a One-Year Deal
February 3, 2022	Traded Bria Hartley, the 20th Pick in the 2022 WNBA draft, and a 2nd Round Pick in 2023 to the Indiana Fever, as well as a 1st Round Pick in 2023 to the Chicago Sky in exchange for Diamond DeShields from Chicago
February 3, 2022	Signed Jennie Simms to a training-camp contract
February 4, 2022	Signed Tina Charles to a One-Year Deal
February 5, 2022	Signed Kia Nurse to One-Year Deal
February 13, 2022	Signed Leaonna Odom to a training-camp contract
March 1, 2022	Signed Kiana Williams to a training-camp contract
March 2, 2022	Hired Crystal Robinson as an assistant coach
March 10, 2022	Signed Kristine Anigwe to a training-camp contract
March 31, 2022	Hired Nikki Blue and Cinnamon Lister as Assistant Coaches
April 12, 2022	Signed Sam Thomas to a training-camp contract
April 13, 2022	Signed Maya Dodson and Macee Williams to rookie-scale contracts
April 13, 2022	Signed Mael Gilles and Vivian Gray to training-camp contracts
April 16, 2022	Signed Emma Cannon to a training-camp contract
April 21, 2022	Waived Macee Williams
April 30, 2022	Waived Mael Gilles
May 3, 2022	Waived Emma Cannon, Kiana Williams, Jennie Simms, and Vivian Gray
May 4, 2022	Signed Megan Gustafson to a training-camp contract
May 5, 2022	Temporarily Suspend Brianna Turner and Diamond DeShields due to Overseas Commitments
May 5, 2022	Waived Maya Dodson and Leaonna Odom
May 6, 2022	Signed Emma Cannon and Jennie Simms to Hardship Contracts
May 10, 2022	Activated Brianna Turner and Diamond DeShields from their Temporary Suspensions
May 10, 2022	Released Emma Cannon and Jennie Simms from their Hardship Contracts
May 14, 2022	Signed Brianna Turner to a Contract Extension
May 25, 2022	Signed Karlie Samuelson to a Hardship Contract
May 30, 2022	Released Karlie Samuelson from her Hardship Contract
June 9, 2022	Signed Jennie Simms to a Hardship Contract
June 23, 2022	Released Jennie Simms from her Hardship Contract
June 24, 2022	Waived Kristine Anigwe
June 25, 2022	Waived Tina Charles
June 28, 2022	Signed Reshanda Gray and Jennie Simms to 7-day contracts
July 4, 2022	Signed Reshanda Gray and Jennie Simms to their 2nd 7-day contracts
July 11, 2022	Signed Reshanda Gray and Jennie Simms to their 3rd 7-day contracts
July 18, 2022	Signed Reshanda Gray
July 18, 2022	Signed Jennie Simms to a Hardship Contract
July 21, 2022	Signed Kaela Davis to a 7-Day Hardship Contract
July 29, 2022	Signed Kaela Davis to a 2nd 7-Day Hardship Contract
August 8, 2022	Signed Yvonne Turner to a Hardship Contract
August 10, 2022	Temporarily Suspend Skylar Diggins-Smith
August 11, 2022	Signed Kaela Davis to a Hardship Contract

== Roster ==
2022 Phoenix Mercury roster
Players
Coaches

Pos.	No.	Nat.	Name	Height	Weight	DOB	From	Yrs
G	9	(United States)	Cunningham, Sophie	6' 1" (1.85m)	170 lb (77kg)	1996-08-16	Missouri	3
G	33	(United States)	Davis, Kaela	6' 2" (1.88m)	170 lb (77kg)	1995-03-15	South Carolina	4
G	1	(United States)	DeShields, Diamond	6' 1" (1.85m)	172 lb (78kg)	1995-03-05	Tennessee	4
G	4	(United States)	Diggins, Skylar (S)	5' 9" (1.75m)	145 lb (66kg)	1990-08-02	Notre Dame	8
F	12	(United States)	Gray, Reshanda	6' 2" (1.88m)	192 lb (87kg)	1993-06-01	California	5
C	42	(United States)	Griner, Brittney (inactive)	6' 9" (2.06m)	205 lb (93kg)	1990-10-18	Baylor	9
C	10	(United States)	Gustafson, Megan	6' 3" (1.91m)	195 lb (88kg)	1996-12-13	Iowa	3
G	0	(Canada)	Nurse, Kia (injured)	6' 0" (1.83m)	168 lb (76kg)	1996-02-22	Connecticut	4
G	11	(United States)	Peddy, Shey	5' 7" (1.7m)	147 lb (67kg)	1988-10-28	Temple	3
G	25	(United States)	Simms, Jennie	6' 0" (1.83m)	165 lb (75kg)	1994-04-21	Old Dominion	1
G/F	3	(United States)	Taurasi, Diana (injured)	6' 0" (1.83m)	163 lb (74kg)	1982-06-11	Connecticut	17
G/F	14	(United States)	Thomas, Sam	6' 0" (1.83m)	170 lb (77kg)	1999-06-14	Arizona	R
F	21	(United States)	Turner, Brianna	6' 3" (1.91m)	170 lb (77kg)	1996-07-05	Notre Dame	3
G	22	(United States)	Turner, Yvonne	5' 10" (1.78m)	131 lb (59kg)	1987-10-13	Nebraska	3

Head coach
(United States) Vanessa Nygaard (Stanford)
Assistant coaches
(United States) Crystal Robinson (SE Oklahoma State)
(United States) Nikki Blue (UCLA)
(United States) Cinnamon Lister (Cal State Northridge)
Athletic trainer
(United States) Hannah Breck (Boston University)
Strength and conditioning coach
(United States) Derrick Nillissen (Iowa Wesleyan)

Legend

- (C) Team captain
- (DP) Unsigned draft pick
- (FA) Free agent
- (S) Suspended
- Injured

=== Depth ===
Pos.	Starter	Bench
C	Brianna Turner	Reshanda Gray; Brittney Griner (inactive)
PF	Sophie Cunningham	Megan Gustafson
SF	Diana Taurasi	Diamond DeShields; Sam Thomas
SG	Shey Peddy	Jennie Simms; Kia Nurse
PG	Skylar Diggins-Smith (inactive)

== Schedule ==
=== Preseason ===
2022 pre-season game log
Total: 0–2 (Home: 0–1; Road: 0–1)
April: 0–2 (Home: 0–1; Road: 0–1)

Game	Date	Team	Score	High points	High rebounds	High assists	Location Attendance	Record
1	April 28	Seattle	L 78–82	Tina Charles (16)	Kristine Anigwe (8)	Skylar Diggins-Smith (8)	Footprint Center; 2,759	0–1
2	April 30	@ Los Angeles	L 84–87	Kiana Williams (25)	Kristine Anigwe (11)	Cannon; Simms (3)	Matadome; N/A	0–2

2022 pre-season schedule

=== Regular season ===
2022 game log
Total: 15–21 (Home: 11–7; Road: 4–14)
May: 2–7 (Home: 1–2; Road: 1–5)

Game	Date	Team	Score	High points	High rebounds	High assists	Location Attendance	Record
1	May 6	Las Vegas	L 88–106	Skylar Diggins-Smith (25)	Taurasi; Simms (4)	Diana Taurasi (9)	Footprint Center; 7,167	0–1
2	May 11	Seattle	W 97–77	Tina Charles (22)	Tina Charles (11)	Diggins-Smith; Peddy (6)	Footprint Center; 6,098	1–1
3	May 14	@ Seattle	W 69–64	Diana Taurasi (24)	Brianna Turner (14)	Skylar Diggins-Smith (5)	Climate Pledge Arena; 12,453	2–1
4	May 17	@ Las Vegas	L 74–86	Tina Charles (17)	Tina Charles (9)	Skylar Diggins-Smith (6)	Michelob Ultra Arena; 2,536	2–2
5	May 19	Dallas	L 84–94	Diamond DeShields (22)	Tina Charles (11)	Shey Peddy (5)	Footprint Center; 6,151	2–3
6	May 21	@ Las Vegas	L 80–100	Diamond DeShields (19)	Brianna Turner (8)	Diana Taurasi (7)	Michelob Ultra Arena; 5,572	2–4
7	May 25	@ Los Angeles	L 94–99	Skylar Diggins-Smith (28)	Tina Charles (7)	Diamond DeShields (9)	Crypto.com Arena; 4,020	2–5
8	May 29	@ Atlanta	L 54–81	Diamond DeShields (23)	Brianna Turner (8)	Skylar Diggins-Smith (5)	Gateway Center Arena; 3,138	2–6
9	May 31	@ Chicago	L 70–73	Tina Charles (25)	Brianna Turner (9)	Skylar Diggins-Smith (8)	Wintrust Arena; 5,133	2–7

June : 7–5 (Home: 4–2; Road: 3–3)

Game	Date	Team	Score	High points	High rebounds	High assists	Location Attendance	Record
10	June 3	Connecticut	L 88–92	Diana Taurasi (32)	Skylar Diggins-Smith (6)	Skylar Diggins-Smith (6)	Footprint Center; 7,180	2–8
11	June 5	Los Angeles	W 81–74	Skylar Diggins-Smith (29)	Brianna Turner (9)	Diana Taurasi (7)	Footprint Center; 10,151	3–8
12	June 10	Atlanta	W 90–88	Diana Taurasi (23)	Brianna Turner (13)	Diana Taurasi (6)	Footprint Center; 7,650	4–8
13	June 12	@ Washington	W 99–90 (OT)	Skylar Diggins-Smith (27)	Brianna Turner (10)	Diana Taurasi (7)	Entertainment and Sports Arena; 4,200	5–8
14	June 14	@ Washington	L 65–83	Diamond DeShields (21)	Diamond DeShields (8)	Skylar Diggins-Smith (8)	Entertainment and Sports Arena; 3,088	5–9
15	June 15	@ Indiana	W 93–80	Tina Charles (29)	Brianna Turner (10)	Shey Peddy (7)	Indiana Farmers Coliseum; 1,824	6–9
16	June 17	@ Dallas	L 88–93	Tina Charles (27)	Tina Charles (9)	Skylar Diggins-Smith (10)	College Park Center; 3,140	6–10
17	June 21	Minnesota	L 71–84	Skylar Diggins-Smith (25)	Tina Charles (7)	Skylar Diggins-Smith (6)	Footprint Center; 6,394	6–11
18	June 23	@ Minnesota	L 88–100	Tina Charles (26)	Brianna Turner (8)	Skylar Diggins-Smith (5)	Target Center; 8,004	6–12
19	June 25	@ Dallas	W 83–72	Skylar Diggins-Smith (26)	Diamond DeShields (10)	Shey Peddy (6)	College Park Center; 4,240	7–12
20	June 27	Indiana	W 83–71	Diana Taurasi (27)	Brianna Turner (8)	Shey Peddy (5)	Footprint Center; 5,044	8–12
21	June 29	Indiana	W 99–78	Skylar Diggins-Smith (17)	Brianna Turner (11)	Diggins-Smith; Taurasi (7)	Footprint Center; 5,833	9–12

July : 4–5 (Home: 4–1; Road: 0–4)

Game	Date	Team	Score	High points	High rebounds	High assists	Location Attendance	Record
22	July 2	@ Chicago	L 75–91	Skylar Diggins-Smith (25)	Diamond DeShields (9)	Shey Peddy (6)	Wintrust Arena; 8,028	9–13
23	July 4	@ Los Angeles	L 75–78	Skylar Diggins-Smith (22)	Cunningham; Peddy (6)	Diana Taurasi (6)	Crypto.com Arena; 3,340	9–14
24	July 7	New York	W 84–81	Cunningham; Taurasi (23)	Skylar Diggins-Smith (7)	Skylar Diggins-Smith (9)	Footprint Center; 6,158	10–14
25	July 12	@ Minnesota	L 107–118 (2OT)	Sophie Cunningham (36)	Shey Peddy (10)	Skylar Diggins-Smith (10)	Target Center; 6,503	10–15
26	July 14	Washington	W 80–75	Skylar Diggins-Smith (29)	Cunningham; Taurasi (7)	Skylar Diggins-Smith (9)	Footprint Center; 5,994	11–15
27	July 17	Atlanta	L 75–85	Diana Taurasi (23)	Sophie Cunningham (9)	Shey Peddy (5)	Footprint Center; 7,963	11–16
28	July 22	Seattle	W 94–78	Skylar Diggins-Smith (35)	Peddy; Taurasi (7)	Diana Taurasi (7)	Footprint Center; 14,162	12–16
29	July 28	Los Angeles	W 90–80	Diana Taurasi (30)	Brianna Turner (7)	Skylar Diggins-Smith (6)	Footprint Center; 8,124	13–16
30	July 31	@ New York	L 69–89	Sophie Cunningham (21)	Shey Peddy (12)	Skylar Diggins-Smith (11)	Barclays Center; 6,433	13–17

August : 2–4 (Home: 2–2; Road: 0–2)

Game	Date	Team	Score	High points	High rebounds	High assists	Location Attendance	Record
31	August 2	@ Connecticut	L 63–87	Cunningham; Diggins-Smith (15)	Brianna Turner (6)	Diggins-Smith; Peddy (4)	Mohegan Sun Arena; 6,130	13–18
32	August 4	@ Connecticut	L 64–77	Skylar Diggins-Smith (16)	Brianna Turner (12)	Brianna Turner (7)	Mohegan Sun Arena; 6,215	13–19
33	August 6	New York	W 76–62	Diamond DeShields (25)	Cunningham; DeShields; Simms (8)	Brianna Turner (4)	Footprint Center; 11,724	14–19
34	August 10	Minnesota	L 77–86	Sophie Cunningham (24)	Shey Peddy (10)	Diamond DeShields (10)	Footprint Center; 7,307	14–20
35	August 12	Dallas	W 86–74	Diamond DeShields (24)	Cunningham; DeShields; Peddy (5)	Shey Peddy (8)	Footprint Center; 8,047	15–20
36	August 14	Chicago	L 67–82	Gustafson; Simms (12)	Megan Gustafson (10)	Yvonne Turner (4)	Footprint Center; 12,383	15–21

2022 season schedule

=== Playoffs ===
2022 playoff game log
First Round vs. Las Vegas Aces
Lost Series: 0–2

Game	Date	Team	Score	High points	High rebounds	High assists	Location Attendance	Series
1	August 18	@ Las Vegas	L 63–79	Diamond DeShields (18)	Brianna Turner (16)	Shey Peddy (5)	Michelob Ultra Arena; 8,725	0–1
2	August 21	@ Las Vegas	L 80-117	Kaela Davis (23)	Brianna Turner (7)	B. Turner; Simms; Davis; Gustafson (3)	Michelob Ultra Arena; 9,126	0–2

2022 playoff schedule

== Standings ==
#	Team	W	L	PCT	GB	Conf.	Home	Road	Cup
1	x – Las Vegas Aces	26	10	.722	–	15–3	13–5	13–5	9–1
2	x – Chicago Sky	26	10	.722	–	15–3	14–4	12–6	9–1
3	x – Connecticut Sun	25	11	.694	1.0	11–7	13–5	12–6	5–5
4	x – Seattle Storm	22	14	.611	4.0	10–8	13–5	9–9	6–4
5	x – Washington Mystics	22	14	.611	4.0	11–7	12–6	10–8	5–5
6	x – Dallas Wings	18	18	.500	8.0	8–10	8–10	10–8	5–5
7	x – New York Liberty	16	20	.444	10.0	10–8	9–9	7–11	6–4
8	x – Phoenix Mercury	15	21	.417	11.0	7–11	11–7	4–14	3–7
9	e – Minnesota Lynx	14	22	.389	12.0	8–10	7–11	7–11	4–6
10	e – Atlanta Dream	14	22	.389	12.0	5–13	8–10	6–12	3–7
11	e – Los Angeles Sparks	13	23	.361	13.0	6–12	7–11	6–12	3–7
12	e – Indiana Fever	5	31	.139	21.0	2–16	3–15	2–16	2–8

Notes

(#) – League Standing
x – Clinched playoff berth
e – Eliminated from playoff contention
Source: Overall standings and Commissioner's Cup Standings

== Playoffs ==
**First round** Best-of-3
**1**	**Las Vegas Aces**	**2**
8	Phoenix Mercury	0
**4**	**Seattle Storm**	**2**
5	Washington Mystics	0
**2**	**Chicago Sky**	**2**
7	New York Liberty	1
**3**	**Connecticut Sun**	**2**
6	Dallas Wings	1

**Semifinals**; Best-of-5
**1**	**Las Vegas Aces**	**3**
4	Seattle Storm	1
2	Chicago Sky	2
**3**	**Connecticut Sun**	**3**

**Finals**; Best-of-5
**1**	**Las Vegas Aces**	**3**
3	Connecticut Sun	1

- **Bold** – Series winner
- Italic – Team with home-court advantage

== Statistics ==
Legend
GP	Games played	GS	Games started	MPG	Minutes per game	RPG	Rebounds per game
APG	Assists per game	SPG	Steals per game	BPG	Blocks per game	PPG	Points per game
FG%	Field-goal percentage	3P%	3-point field-goal percentage	FT%	Free-throw percentage	TO	Turnovers per game
PF	Fouls per game		Team leader		League leader

=== Regular season ===
Player	GP	GS	MPG	FG%	3P%	FT%	RPG	APG	SPG	BPG	PPG
Skylar Diggins-Smith	30	30	34.0	.429	.296	.844	4.0	5.5	1.6	1.0	19.7
Tina Charles^{‡}	16	16	33.1	.441	.364	.800	7.3	2.1	0.8	0.8	17.3
Diana Taurasi	31	31	31.0	.373	.337	.894	3.4	3.8	0.7	0.6	16.7
Diamond DeShields	30	19	25.3	.388	.236	.765	3.8	2.2	1.0	0.5	13.1
Sophie Cunningham	28	20	29.5	.449	.400	.875	4.4	1.6	1.0	0.4	12.6
Shey Peddy	34	24	28.6	.418	.329	.889	3.8	3.4	1.6	0.2	9.9
Kaela Davis^{≠}	5	0	5.4	.692	.667	.750	1.2	0.0	0.0	0.0	4.6
Brianna Turner	35	35	33.4	.607	.000	.500	6.8	2.3	1.2	1.6	4.3
Megan Gustafson	33	0	9.6	.549	.462	.765	1.9	0.5	0.2	0.2	3.8
Jennie Simms^{≠}	23	4	13.2	.476	.211	.789	2.2	0.9	0.5	0.0	3.4
Yvonne Turner^{≠}	3	0	11.7	.400	.000	1.000	0.7	2.3	0.0	0.0	3.3
Karlie Samuelson^{‡}	1	0	10.0	.333	.333	.000	3.0	1.0	0.0	0.0	3.0
Emma Cannon^{‡}	1	0	6.0	1.000	.000	.500	2.0	1.0	0.0	0.0	3.0
Reshanda Gray^{≠}	16	0	9.5	.405	.091	.333	1.8	0.6	0.3	0.3	2.0
Kristine Anigwe^{‡}	10	1	6.5	.500	.000	.500	1.3	0.2	0.1	0.2	1.5
Sam Thomas	24	0	4.9	.211	.067	1.000	0.2	0.3	0.3	0.1	0.4

^{‡}Waived/Released during the season
^{†}Traded during the season
^{≠}Acquired during the season

=== Playoffs ===
Player	GP	GS	MPG	FG%	3P%	FT%	RPG	APG	SPG	BPG	PPG
Diamond DeShields	2	2	27.0	.432	.333	.714	4.5	2.0	1.0	0.0	19.5
Kaela Davis	2	0	23.5	.483	.000	.800	3.5	1.5	0.5	0.5	16.0
Megan Gustafson	2	0	23.5	.316	.000	1.000	4.5	2.0	0.5	0.5	9.0
Shey Peddy	1	1	26.0	.231	.286	.000	2.0	5.0	2.0	0.0	8.0
Sophie Cunningham	2	2	31.0	.455	.375	.333	2.5	2.0	0.5	0.0	7.5
Jennie Simms	2	2	24.5	.267	.200	.200	3.0	2.0	0.0	0.0	5.5
Brianna Turner	2	2	30.0	.444	.000	.000	11.5	2.5	0.0	0.5	4.0
Reshanda Gray	2	0	8.0	.400	.000	.500	1.0	0.0	0.0	0.0	2.5
Yvonne Turner	2	1	12.0	.286	.000	.000	3.0	1.5	0.0	0.0	2.0
Sam Thomas	2	0	7.0	.500	.500	.000	0.0	0.0	0.5	0.0	1.5

== Awards and honors ==
Recipient	Award/Milestone	Date awarded	Ref.
Skylar Diggins-Smith	WNBA All-Star Selection	June 28	
Skylar Diggins-Smith	Western Conference Player of the Week	July 18	
Skylar Diggins-Smith	All-WNBA First Team	September 15	
