= Jocelyn Willoughby =

American basketball player (born 1998)

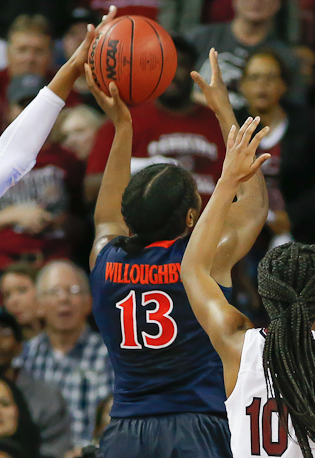

Personal information
- Born: March 25, 1998 (age 28) East Orange, New Jersey, U.S.
- Listed height: 6 ft 0 in (1.83 m)
- Listed weight: 180 lb (82 kg)

Career information
- High school: Newark Academy (Livingston, New Jersey)
- College: Virginia (2016–2020)
- WNBA draft: 2020: 1st round, 10th overall pick
- Drafted by: Phoenix Mercury
- Playing career: 2020–present
- Position: Small forward / shooting guard

Career history
- 2020–2023: New York Liberty

Career highlights
- WNBA Commissioner's Cup Champion (2023); First-team All-ACC (2020); ACC All-Freshmen Team (2017); Gatorade New Jersey Player of the Year (2016)
- Stats at Basketball Reference

Jocelyn Willoughby (born March 25, 1998) is an American basketball player. She played college basketball for the University of Virginia Cavaliers of the Atlantic Coast Conference.

Born and raised in East Orange, New Jersey, Willoughby played prep basketball at Newark Academy.

Willoughby led the ACC in scoring as a senior, averaging 19.2 points and 7.7 rebounds per game.

The Phoenix Mercury selected Willoughby with the 10th pick in the 2020 WNBA draft, only to trade her to the New York Liberty in exchange for Shatori Walker-Kimbrough.

On February 19, 2024, Willoughby signed a training camp contract with the Connecticut Sun. On 13 May 2024, Willoughby was waived by the Connecticut Sun.

== Career statistics ==
Legend
GP	Games played	GS	Games started	MPG	Minutes per game	RPG	Rebounds per game
APG	Assists per game	SPG	Steals per game	BPG	Blocks per game	PPG	Points per game
TO	Turnovers per game	FG%	Field-goal percentage	3P%	3-point field-goal percentage	FT%	Free-throw percentage
**Bold**	Career best	°	League leader

=== WNBA ===
==== Regular season ====
Year	Team	GP	GS	MPG	FG%	3P%	FT%	RPG	APG	SPG	BPG	TO	PPG
2020	New York	22	**5**	**17.4**	.358	.405	.833	**2.4**	**0.9**	**0.7**	**0.3**	1.5	**5.8**
2022	New York	11	4	11.0	**.423**	.273	.500	1.6	0.4	0.5	0.2	0.8	2.6
2023	New York	**29**	0	6.6	.400	**.438**	**1.000**	0.8	0.4	0.1	0.0	**0.3**	1.2
Career	3 years, 1 team	62	9	11.2	.376	.391	.796	1.5	0.6	0.4	0.1	0.8	3.1

==== Playoffs ====
Year	Team	GP	GS	MPG	FG%	3P%	FT%	RPG	APG	SPG	BPG	TO	PPG
2022	New York	2	0	**7.0**	**1.000**	—	**.667**	**0.5**	0.0	0.0	0.0	0.5	**3.0**
2023	New York	**3**	0	2.3	.000	.000	.333	0.3	0.0	**0.3**	0.0	**0.0**	0.7
Career	2 year, 1 team	5	0	4.2	.500	.000	.444	0.4	0.0	0.2	0.0	0.2	1.6

=== College ===
Year	Team	GP	GS	MPG	FG%	3P%	FT%	RPG	APG	SPG	BPG	TO	PPG
2016–17	Virginia	**33**	**33**	29.9	37.8	20.5	74.2	6.2	1.7	**1.7**	0.4	2.8	9.8
2017–18	Virginia	**33**	**33**	29.1	40.4	**44.6**	85.1	5.4	1.0	1.3	0.2	**2.0**	9.6
2018–19	Virginia	31	31	33.9	38.9	39.8	85.1	**8.2**	1.6	1.2	0.6	3.0	14.8
2019–20	Virginia	30	30	**35.8**	**45.1**	41.6	**87.0**	7.7	**2.0**	1.3	**0.6**	3.4	**19.2**°
**Career**		127	127	32.1	40.8	38.8	83.0	6.8	1.6	1.4	0.5	2.8	13.2
Statistics retrieved from Sports-Reference.
