= Shey Peddy =

American basketball player (born 1988)

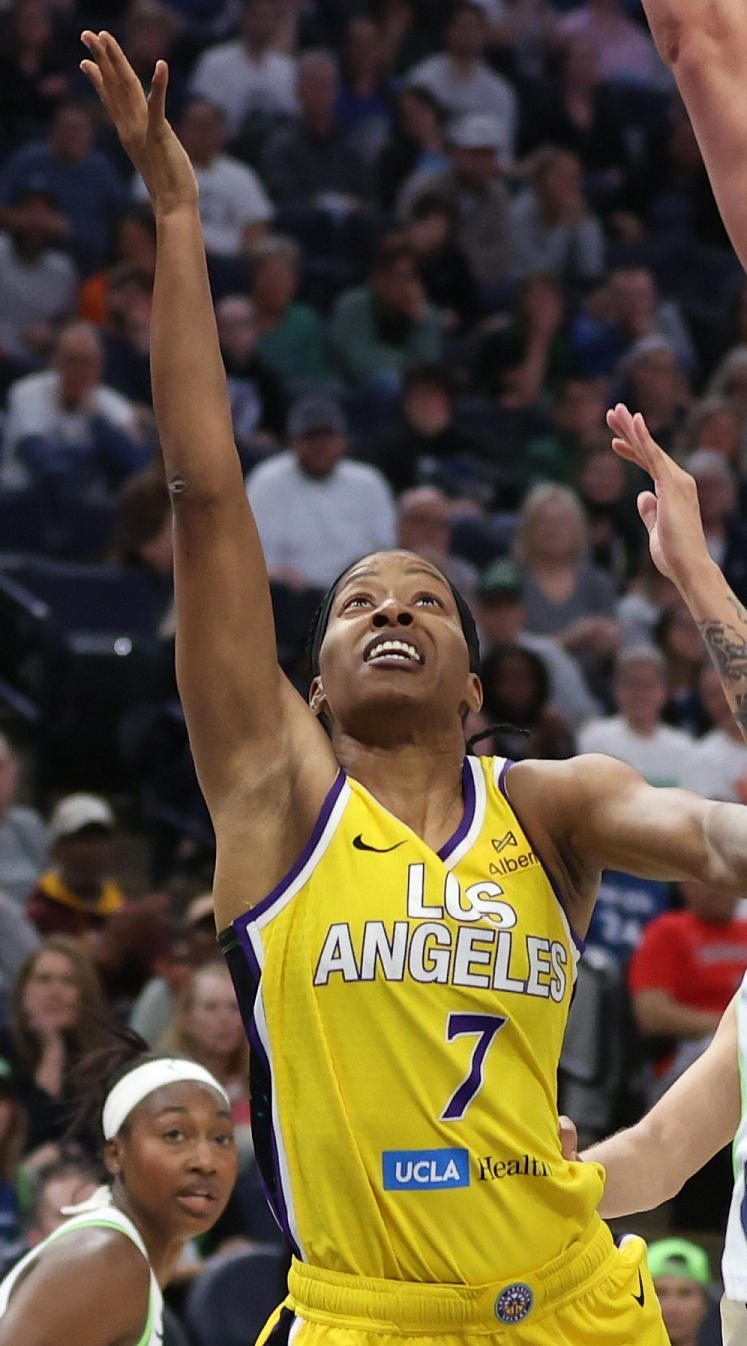
- Peddy with the Los Angeles Sparks in 2025

Personal information
- Born: October 28, 1988 (age 38) Boston, Massachusetts, U.S.
- Listed height: 5 ft 7 in (1.70 m)
- Listed weight: 145 lb (66 kg)

Career information
- High school: Melrose (Melrose, Massachusetts)
- College: Wright State (2007–2009); Temple (2010–2012)
- WNBA draft: 2012: 2nd round, 23rd overall pick
- Drafted by: Chicago Sky
- Playing career: 2012–present
- Position: Point guard

Career history
- 2019–2020: Washington Mystics
- 2020–2023: Phoenix Mercury
- 2025: Los Angeles Sparks
- 2025: Indiana Fever
- 2025: Çanakkale Belediyespor

Career highlights
- Atlantic 10 Player of the Year (2012); Atlantic 10 Defensive Player of the Year; 2× First-team All-Atlantic 10 (2011, 2012); 2× Atlantic-10 All-Defensive Team (2011, 2012); First-team All-Horizon (2008); 2× Horizon All-Defensive Team (2008, 2009); Horizon All-Freshman of the Year (2008); Horizon All-Freshman Team (2008)
- Stats at Basketball Reference

Sheylani Marie Peddy (born October 28, 1988) is an American basketball player who last played for the Indiana Fever of the Women's National Basketball Association (WNBA). She previously played for the Washington Mystics, Phoenix Mercury, and Los Angeles Sparks. She was drafted into the league by the Chicago Sky in the 2012 WNBA draft and spent several years playing on multiple professional teams overseas including the Flying Foxes in Austria, H.R. Le-Zion in Israel, and TSV 1880 Wasserburg in Germany, before finally making her WNBA debut with the Washington Mystics in 2019, seven years after she was originally drafted into the league.

== College ==
Peddy spent two years (freshman and sophomore) at Wright State University and two years (junior and senior) at Temple University. She recorded 1,899 total points between the four years. At her senior year at Temple, she averaged 17.6 points, 4.8 rebounds, and 3.1 assists per game.

== Professional career ==
Peddy signed with the Washington Mystics on June 29, 2020, and made her debut for the team on the opening day of the season.

== Career statistics ==
Legend
GP	Games played	GS	Games started	MPG	Minutes per game	RPG	Rebounds per game
APG	Assists per game	SPG	Steals per game	BPG	Blocks per game	PPG	Points per game
TO	Turnovers per game	FG%	Field-goal percentage	3P%	3-point field-goal percentage	FT%	Free-throw percentage
**Bold**	Career best	°	League leader

=== WNBA ===
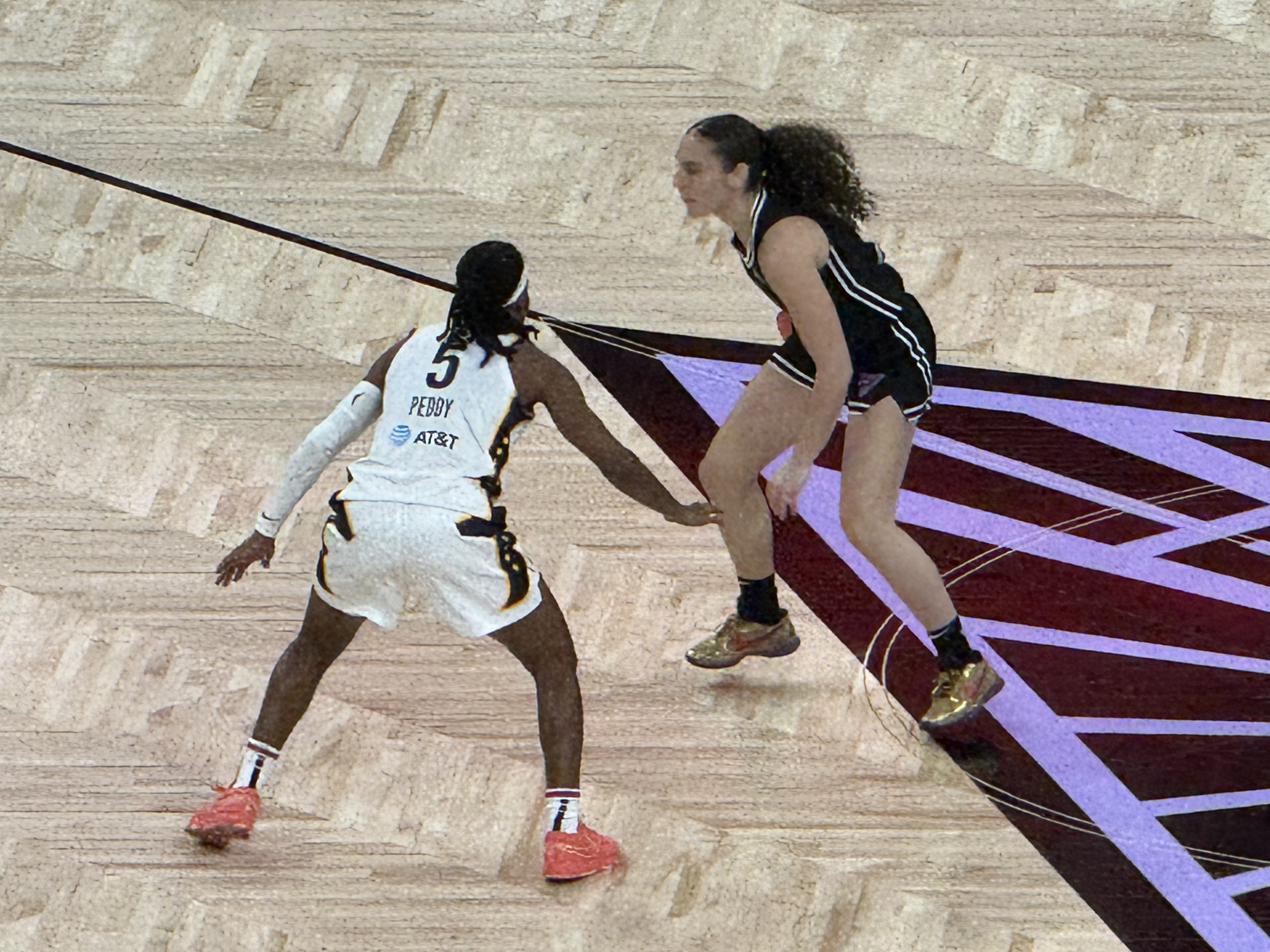
Peddy defending against Golden State Valkyrie Carla Leite in San Francisco, Calif., on Aug. 31, 2025.

==== Regular season ====
Stats current through end of 2025 season

WNBA regular season statistics
Year	Team	GP	GS	MPG	FG%	3P%	FT%	RPG	APG	SPG	BPG	TO	PPG
2012	Did not play (waived)												
2013	Did not play (waived)												
2014	Did not appear in league												
2015	Did not appear in league												
2016	Did not appear in league												
2017	Did not appear in league												
2018	Did not appear in league												
2019	Washington	15	0	4.7	**.615**	**.500**	**1.000**	0.6	0.5	0.3	0.0	**0.2**	1.7
2020	Washington	9	0	12.9	.310	.133	**1.000**	1.2	1.2	0.8	0.0	0.9	3.6
2020	Phoenix	8	0	17.6	.292	.105	**1.000**	3.0	2.4	1.5	0.1	0.9	4.0
2021	Phoenix	32	5	17.5	.412	.333	.920	2.3	2.5	0.9	0.1	1.0	5.4
2022	Phoenix	**34**	**24**	**28.6**	.418	.329	.889	**3.8**	**3.4**	**1.6**	**0.2**	1.4	**9.9**
2023	Phoenix	18	0	15.8	.369	.348	.800	1.8	1.8	0.9	0.0	0.6	5.2
2024	Did not appear in league												
2025	Los Angeles	6	5	23.0	.417	.385	.833	3.0	2.7	0.3	0.0	0.7	5.0
2025	Indiana	9	0	14.1	.548	.500	.667	0.8	1.7	0.4	0.0	1.0	5.2
**Career**	6 years, 4 teams	131	34	18.4	.409	.329	.897	2.4	2.3	1.0	0.1	0.9	5.9

==== Playoffs ====
WNBA playoff statistics
Year	Team	GP	GS	MPG	FG%	3P%	FT%	RPG	APG	SPG	BPG	TO	PPG
2020	Phoenix	2	1	21.0	**.455**	**.375**	**1.000**	3.0	1.5	**3.0**°	**0.5**	**0.5**	7.5
2021	Phoenix	**11**	**4**	23.2	.382	.258	.722	**3.5**	2.5	2.0	0.0	0.9	6.6
2022	Phoenix	1	1	**26.0**	.231	.286	—	2.0	**5.0**	2.0	0.0	1.0	**8.0**
2025	Indiana	8	0	16.3	.429	.353	**1.000**	1.5	1.0	0.6	0.1	0.9	5.3
**Career**	4 years, 2 teams	22	6	20.6	.386	.302	.808	2.7	2.0	1.6	0.1	0.9	6.3

=== College ===
NCAA statistics
Year	Team	GP	Points	FG%	3P%	FT%	RPG	APG	SPG	BPG	PPG
2007–08	Wright State	30	502	**53.9**	**39.3**	79.4	3.9	3.4	**3.2**	0.2	16.7
2008–09	Wright State	29	352	39.6	23.4	78.0	3.7	4.0	3.0	0.1	12.1
2009–10	Temple	Did not play (redshirt)									
2010–11	Temple	**33**	465	46.0	36.7	77.6	**5.1**	**4.2**	3.2	**0.2**	14.1
2011–12	Temple	**33**	**580**	46.8	37.9	**81.6**	4.8	3.1	3.1	0.2	**17.6**°
**Career**		125	1899	46.6	34.8	79.3	4.4	3.6	3.1	0.2	15.2

== Awards ==
- 2011-12 Atlantic 10 Women's Basketball Player of the Year
- 2011-12 Atlantic 10 Women's Basketball Defensive Player of the Year
- 2x Big 5 Player of the Year
