= 2022 Minnesota Lynx season =

24th season for the Minnesota Lynx of the WNBA

- Head coach: Cheryl Reeve
- Arena: Target Center

Results
- Record: 14–22 (.389)
- Place: 5th (Western)
- Playoff finish: Did not qualify

Media
- Television: Bally Sports North; ESPN; ESPN2; ABC; NBA TV; CBS Sports Network; Amazon Prime; Facebook

The 2022 Minnesota Lynx season was the 24th season for the Minnesota Lynx of the Women's National Basketball Association, and the 13th season under head coach Cheryl Reeve.

The season tipped-off on May 6, 2022, versus the Seattle Storm.

On November 28, 2021, Napheesa Collier announced her pregnancy with an announcement in People Magazine. Collier stated, "“I am very excited to start a family with my fiancé Alex. Having a child is truly a beautiful journey and I am grateful to have the support of our families, friends and the Lynx as I begin this special chapter of motherhood.” On December 8, 2021, Cheryl Reeve was named the new United States women's national basketball team head coach for the 2021-2024 cycle.

On February 1, 2022, the Lynx opened free agency and re-signed Sylvia Fowles to a one-year deal. Fowles also announced at this time that this season would be her last and she would be retiring following the 2022 season.

The Lynx struggled to start the season, losing their first four games and only winning two games in the first month of the season. They finished May 2–7 overall. Their struggles continued into June as they won only one of the first seven games in the month and went on a five game losing streak. However, their fortunes improved at the end of the month as they won three of their last four games to finish the month 4–7. The momentum carried over into July and the Lynx won four of their first six games, but then only won two of their last five games to finish the season 6–5. A better August might have seen the Lynx qualify for the playoffs, but they finished the month 2–3, which left them one game out of the eighth and final playoff spot. This was the first time since 2010, the Lynx missed the playoffs and had a sub-.500 record. This ended the WNBA’s longest active playoff streak at 12 straight years.

Moriah Jefferson recorded the first-ever triple-double in Lynx history on June 28, 2022. She had 13 points, 10 rebounds, and 10 assists in a 92–64 victory over her former team, the Dallas Wings. The 10 assists were also a career-high for Jefferson.

Napheesa Collier returned to the court on August 7, 2022, just 10 and half weeks after giving birth to her daughter. She finished with 6 points, 2 rebounds, 1 assist, 1 steal, and 1 block in the game.

== Transactions ==
=== WNBA draft ===
Round	Pick	Player	Nationality	School/team/country
2	22	Kayla Jones	United States	NC State
3	28	Hannah Sjerven	United States	South Dakota

=== Trades and Roster Changes ===
Date	Transaction
January 3, 2022	Extended Qualifying Offers to Anna Cruz and Bridget Carleton
January 4, 2022	Signed Bridget Carleton to a Qualifying Offer
January 12, 2022	Promoted Katie Smith to Associate head coach
February 1, 2022	Re-signed Sylvia Fowles to a One-Year Deal
February 2, 2022	Signed Angel McCoughtry to a One-Year Deal
February 8, 2022	Signed Layshia Clarendon to a One-Year Deal
February 8, 2022	Signed Rachel Banham to a training-camp contract
February 18, 2022	Signed Yvonne Turner and Natasha Mack to training-camp contracts
April 10, 2022	Traded the #8 and #13 picks in the 2022 WNBA draft to the Las Vegas Aces in exchange for a First and a Second Round Pick in the 2023 WNBA Draft
April 13, 2022	Signed Kayla Jones and Hannah Sjerven to rookie-scale contracts
April 13, 2022	Signed Chloe Bibby, CeCe Hooks, and Moon Ursin to training-camp contracts
April 15, 2022	Waived Natasha Mack
April 28, 2022	Waived CeCe Hooks
May 2, 2022	Signed Napheesa Collier to a Multi-Year Extension
May 2, 2022	Waived Chloe Bibby and Moon Ursin
May 3, 2022	Signed Odyssey Sims to a training-camp contract
May 3, 2022	Waived Layshia Clarendon, Crystal Dangerfield, Yvonne Turner, Rennia Davis, Hannah Sjerven, and Kayla Jones
May 5, 2022	Temporarily Suspend Kayla McBride due to Overseas Commitments
May 6, 2022	Signed Yvonne Turner and Nina Milić
May 10, 2022	Signed Rennia Davis to a Hardship Contract
May 12, 2022	Waived Angel McCoughtry and Odyssey Sims
May 12, 2022	Released Rennia Davis, Nikolina Milić, and Yvonne Turner from their Hardship Contracts
May 13, 2022	Signed Moriah Jefferson and Evina Westbrook
May 13, 2022	Signed Yvonne Turner, Nikolina Milić, and Hannah Sjerven to Hardship Contracts
May 16, 2022	Signed Jessica Shepard to a Multi-Year Contract Extension
May 16, 2022	Activated Kayla McBride from her Temporary Suspension
May 16, 2022	Released Yvonne Turner from her Hardship Contract
May 22, 2022	Released Hannah Sjerven from her Hardship Contract
May 31, 2022	Signed Elissa Cunane to a Hardship Contract
June 1, 2022	Signed Kamiah Smalls to a Hardship Contract
June 9, 2022	Released Kamiah Smalls from her Hardship Contract
June 21, 2022	Released Elissa Cunane from her Hardship Contract
June 23, 2022	Released Nikolina Milić from her Hardship Contract
June 24, 2022	Waived Evina Westbrook
June 26, 2022	Signed Nikolina Milić to a 7-day contract
July 3, 2022	Signed Nikolina Milić to a 2nd 7-day contract
July 11, 2022	Signed Nikolina Milić to a 3rd 7-day contract
July 19, 2022	Signed Nikolina Milić to a Hardship Contract
July 21, 2022	Signed Lindsay Allen to a 7-Day Hardship Contract
July 28, 2022	Signed Lindsay Allen to a 2nd 7-Day Hardship Contract
August 7, 2022	Signed Lindsay Allen to a 3rd 7-Day Hardship Contract
August 7, 2022	Signed Nikolina Milić to a Hardship Contract
August 9, 2022	Released Nikolina Milić and Lindsay Allen from their Hardship Contracts
August 10, 2022	Signed Lindsay Allen to a Hardship Contract

== Roster ==
2022 Minnesota Lynx roster
Players
Coaches

Pos.	No.	Nat.	Name	Height	Weight	DOB	From	Yrs
F	11	(Canada)	Achonwa, Natalie	6' 3" (1.91m)	198 lb (90kg)	1992-11-22	Notre Dame	7
G	2	(United States)	Allen, Lindsay	5' 8" (1.73m)	144 lb (65kg)	1995-03-20	Notre Dame	4
G	15	(United States)	Banham, Rachel	5' 9" (1.75m)	175 lb (79kg)	1993-07-15	Minnesota	6
G/F	6	(Canada)	Carleton, Bridget	6' 1" (1.85m)	190 lb (86kg)	1997-05-22	Iowa State	3
F	24	(United States)	Collier, Napheesa	6' 2" (1.88m)	182 lb (83kg)	1996-09-23	Connecticut	3
F	12	(Brazil)	Dantas, Damiris (inactive)	6' 3" (1.91m)	212 lb (96kg)	1992-11-17	Brazil	7
C	34	(United States)	Fowles, Sylvia	6' 6" (1.98m)	219 lb (99kg)	1985-10-06	LSU	14
G	4	(United States)	Jefferson, Moriah	5' 6" (1.68m)	123 lb (56kg)	1994-03-08	Connecticut	5
G	21	(United States)	McBride, Kayla	5' 10" (1.78m)	184 lb (83kg)	1992-06-25	Notre Dame	8
F	31	(Serbia)	Milić, Nikolina	6' 3" (1.91m)	172 lb (78kg)	1994-04-12	Serbia	R
G/F	3	(United States)	Powers, Aerial	5' 9" (1.75m)	166 lb (75kg)	1994-07-17	Michigan State	6
F	10	(United States)	Shepard, Jessica	6' 3" (1.91m)	184 lb (83kg)	1996-09-11	Notre Dame	2

Head coach
(United States) Cheryl Reeve (La Salle)
Assistant coaches
(United States) Katie Smith (Ohio State)
(United States) Rebekkah Brunson (Georgetown)
Athletic trainer
(United States) Chuck Barta (UW–La Crosse)
Assistant trainer
(United States) Brandi BlueArm (Minnesota State)

Legend

- (C) Team captain
- (DP) Unsigned draft pick
- (FA) Free agent
- (S) Suspended
- Injured

=== Depth ===
Pos.	Starter	Bench
C	Sylvia Fowles	Natalie Achonwa
PF	Jessica Shepard	Nikolina Milić; Damiris Dantas (inactive)
SF	Napheesa Collier	Aerial Powers; Bridget Carleton
SG	Kayla McBride	Rachel Banham
PG	Moriah Jefferson	Lindsay Allen

== Schedule ==
=== Preseason ===
2022 pre-season game log
Total: 1–1 (Home:1–0; Road: 0–1)
April: 0–1 (Home: 0–0; Road: 0–1)

Game	Date	Team	Score	High points	High rebounds	High assists	Location Attendance	Record
1	April 27	@ Washington	L 66–78	Sylvia Fowles (16)	Sylvia Fowles (8)	Achonwa; Turner (2)	Entertainment and Sports Arena; 3,220	0–1

May : 1–0 (Home: 1–0; Road: 0–0)

Game	Date	Team	Score	High points	High rebounds	High assists	Location Attendance	Record
2	May 1	Las Vegas	W 89–86	Yvonne Turner (15)	Rennia Davis (13)	Clarendon; Turner; Shepard (3)	Target Center; N/A	1–1

2022 pre-season schedule

=== Regular season ===
2022 game log
Total: 14–22 (Home: 7–11; Road: 7–11)
May: 2–7 (Home: 1–3; Road: 1–4)

Game	Date	Team	Score	High points	High rebounds	High assists	Location Attendance	Record
1	May 6	@ Seattle	L 74–97	Sylvia Fowles (16)	Jessica Shepard (12)	Jessica Shepard (5)	Climate Pledge Arena; 12,904	0–1
2	May 8	Washington	L 66–78	Jessica Shepard (16)	Jessica Shepard (12)	Jessica Shepard (4)	Target Center; 8,134	0–2
3	May 10	@ Indiana	L 76–82	Sylvia Fowles (26)	Sylvia Fowles (14)	Jessica Shepard (9)	Gainbridge Fieldhouse; 1,078	0–3
4	May 14	Chicago	L 78–82	Nikolina Milić (18)	Sylvia Fowles (11)	Jefferson; Westbrook (5)	Target Center; 6,503	0–4
5	May 17	@ Los Angeles	W 87–84	Kayla McBride (24)	Sylvia Fowles (12)	Moriah Jefferson (6)	Crypto.com Arena; 4,701	1–4
6	May 19	@ Las Vegas	L 87–93	Aerial Powers (25)	Jessica Shepard (14)	Moriah Jefferson (7)	Michelob Ultra Arena; 3,640	1–5
7	May 21	@ Dallas	L 78–94	Fowles; McBride; Shepard (14)	Sylvia Fowles (9)	Banham; Jefferson (4)	College Park Center; 3,813	1–6
8	May 24	New York	W 84–78	Aerial Powers (18)	Sylvia Fowles (14)	Jefferson; Shepard (4)	Target Center	2–6
9	May 29	Los Angeles	L 83–85	Kayla McBride (19)	Sylvia Fowles (7)	Moriah Jefferson (4)	Target Center; 7,234	2–7

June : 4–7 (Home: 2–3; Road: 2–4)

Game	Date	Team	Score	High points	High rebounds	High assists	Location Attendance	Record
10	June 1	@ Atlanta	L 76–84	Kayla McBride (20)	Sylvia Fowles (20)	Rachel Banham (6)	Gateway Center Arena; 1,268	2–8
11	June 5	@ New York	W 84–77	Aerial Powers (27)	Sylvia Fowles (8)	Rachel Banham (4)	Barclays Center; 4,119	3–8
12	June 7	@ New York	L 69–88	Kayla McBride (13)	Jessica Shepard (7)	Smalls; Westbrook (4)	Barclays Center; 3,196	3–9
13	June 10	Washington	L 59–76	Aerial Powers (12)	Jessica Shepard (15)	Moriah Jefferson (6)	Target Center; 6,315	3–10
14	June 12	Indiana	L 80–84	Nikolina Milić (18)	Sylvia Fowles (11)	Aerial Powers (7)	Target Center; 6,806	3–11
15	June 14	Seattle	L 79–81	Kayla McBride (20)	Nikolina Milić (7)	Aerial Powers (7)	Target Center; 6,031	3–12
16	June 19	@ Las Vegas	L 95–96	Moriah Jefferson (23)	Jessica Shepard (19)	Moriah Jefferson (7)	Michelob Ultra Arena; 4,603	3–13
17	June 21	@ Phoenix	W 84–71	Kayla McBride (18)	Jessica Shepard (13)	Moriah Jefferson (9)	Footprint Center; 6,394	4–13
18	June 23	Phoenix	W 100–88	Moriah Jefferson (21)	Sylvia Fowles (10)	Aerial Powers (6)	Target Center; 8,004	5–13
19	June 26	@ Chicago	L 85–88	McBride; Shepard (15)	Jessica Shepard (8)	Aerial Powers (7)	Wintrust Arena; 7,022	5–14
20	June 28	Dallas	W 92–64	Aerial Powers (20)	Natalie Achonwa (13)	Moriah Jefferson (10)	Target Center; 5,603	6–14

July : 6–5 (Home: 3–4; Road: 3–1)

Game	Date	Team	Score	High points	High rebounds	High assists	Location Attendance	Record
21	July 1	Las Vegas	L 85–91	Rachel Banham (24)	Sylvia Fowles (5)	Achonwa; Banham (4)	Target Center; 6,104	6–15
22	July 3	Las Vegas	W 102–71	Aerial Powers (32)	Sylvia Fowles (11)	Moriah Jefferson (6)	Target Center; 7,603	7–15
23	July 6	Chicago	W 81–78	Aerial Powers (22)	Aerial Powers (11)	Moriah Jefferson (6)	Target Center; 11,103	8–15
24	July 12	Phoenix	W 118–107 (2OT)	Aerial Powers (35)	Sylvia Fowles (14)	Kayla McBride (5)	Target Center; 6,503	9–15
25	July 14	Dallas	L 87–92	Rachel Banham (24)	Sylvia Fowles (17)	Sylvia Fowles (3)	Target Center; 4,834	9–16
26	July 15	@ Indiana	W 87–77	Kayla McBride (28)	Sylvia Fowles (12)	Jefferson; Shepard (5)	Indiana Farmers Coliseum; 1,530	10–16
27	July 17	@ Washington	L 57–70	Kayla McBride (16)	Fowles; Shepard (12)	Jessica Shepard (7)	Entertainment and Sports Arena; 4,200	10–17
28	July 22	Connecticut	L 84–94	Aerial Powers (14)	Natalie Achonwa (6)	Lindsay Allen (7)	Target Center; 8,321	10–18
29	July 24	Connecticut	L 79–86	Aerial Powers (17)	Jessica Shepard (8)	Aerial Powers (4)	Target Center; 7,231	10–19
30	July 28	@ Atlanta	W 92–85	Aerial Powers (25)	Sylvia Fowles (14)	Moriah Jefferson (7)	Gateway Center Arena; 2,396	11–19
31	July 31	@ Los Angeles	W 84–77	Moriah Jefferson (22)	Jessica Shepard (10)	Jefferson; Powers (4)	Crypto.com Arena; 6,857	12–19

August : 2–3 (Home: 1–1; Road: 1–2)

Game	Date	Team	Score	High points	High rebounds	High assists	Location Attendance	Record
32	August 3	@ Seattle	L 77–89	Nikolina Milić (13)	Fowles; Milić (6)	Natalie Achonwa (6)	Climate Pledge Arena; 13,500	12–20
33	August 7	Atlanta	W 81–71	Kayla McBride (20)	Sylvia Fowles (8)	Jefferson; McBride (6)	Target Center; 9,421	13–20
34	August 10	@ Phoenix	W 86–77	Kayla McBride (18)	Jessica Shepard (12)	Moriah Jefferson (12)	Footprint Center; 7,307	14–20
35	August 12	Seattle	L 69–96	Aerial Powers (18)	Sylvia Fowles (12)	L. Allen; McBride (3)	Target Center; 12,134	14–21
36	August 14	@ Connecticut	L 83–90	Lindsay Allen (26)	Sylvia Fowles (12)	Lindsay Allen (6)	Mohegan Sun Arena; 7,489	14–22

2022 season schedule

== Standings ==
#	Team	W	L	PCT	GB	Conf.	Home	Road	Cup
1	x – Las Vegas Aces	26	10	.722	–	15–3	13–5	13–5	9–1
2	x – Chicago Sky	26	10	.722	–	15–3	14–4	12–6	9–1
3	x – Connecticut Sun	25	11	.694	1.0	11–7	13–5	12–6	5–5
4	x – Seattle Storm	22	14	.611	4.0	10–8	13–5	9–9	6–4
5	x – Washington Mystics	22	14	.611	4.0	11–7	12–6	10–8	5–5
6	x – Dallas Wings	18	18	.500	8.0	8–10	8–10	10–8	5–5
7	x – New York Liberty	16	20	.444	10.0	10–8	9–9	7–11	6–4
8	x – Phoenix Mercury	15	21	.417	11.0	7–11	11–7	4–14	3–7
9	e – Minnesota Lynx	14	22	.389	12.0	8–10	7–11	7–11	4–6
10	e – Atlanta Dream	14	22	.389	12.0	5–13	8–10	6–12	3–7
11	e – Los Angeles Sparks	13	23	.361	13.0	6–12	7–11	6–12	3–7
12	e – Indiana Fever	5	31	.139	21.0	2–16	3–15	2–16	2–8

== Statistics ==
Legend
GP	Games played	GS	Games started	MPG	Minutes per game	RPG	Rebounds per game
APG	Assists per game	SPG	Steals per game	BPG	Blocks per game	PPG	Points per game
FG%	Field-goal percentage	3P%	3-point field-goal percentage	FT%	Free-throw percentage	TO	Turnovers per game
PF	Fouls per game		Team leader		League leader

=== Regular season ===
Player	GP	GS	MPG	FG%	3P%	FT%	RPG	APG	SPG	BPG	PPG
Sylvia Fowles	30	30	27.7	.622	.000	.660	9.8	1.2	1.0	1.2	14.4
Aerial Powers	35	31	26.9	.385	.308	.815	4.7	2.9	1.2	0.3	14.4
Kayla McBride	31	31	29.8	.405	.356	.909	2.8	2.1	1.0	0.1	13.3
Moriah Jefferson^{≠}	30	30	26.8	.452	.474	.815	2.5	4.9	1.2	0.1	10.8
Odyssey Sims^{‡}	2	0	27.0	.304	.250	.444	3.5	3.5	0.5	1.0	9.5
Jessica Shepard	36	22	26.1	.500	.250	.734	7.4	3.0	0.4	0.3	8.1
Rachel Banham	36	5	17.5	.430	.383	.800	1.3	2.3	0.3	0.1	7.9
Napheesa Collier	4	4	22.8	.423	.286	.714	3.0	1.0	0.5	0.3	7.3
Lindsay Allen^{≠}	9	0	14.9	.526	.571	.923	1.6	3.4	0.2	0.0	6.7
Yvonne Turner^{‡}	4	2	22.0	.308	.429	.857	2.5	2.5	0.5	0.0	6.3
Nikolina Milić^{‡}	31	4	11.7	.548	.273	.738	3.0	0.7	0.3	0.3	6.0
Angel McCoughtry^{‡}	2	2	10.0	.375	.000	1.000	3.0	1.0	0.5	1.0	6.0
Natalie Achonwa	22	0	15.1	.304	.262	.815	4.1	1.7	0.4	0.3	5.3
Damiris Dantas	15	15	17.5	.304	.262	.833	3.8	1.9	0.2	0.1	5.1
Bridget Carleton	36	2	16.8	.403	.354	.731	2.1	1.1	0.4	0.1	4.3
Evina Westbrook^{‡}	14	2	12.4	.318	.143	.667	1.4	1.4	0.4	0.4	2.6
Rennia Davis^{‡}	1	0	3.0	1.000	.000	.000	0.0	0.0	0.0	0.0	2.0
Kamiah Smalls^{‡}	3	0	11.3	.250	.000	.000	1.7	2.0	1.3	0.0	1.3
Elissa Cunane^{‡}	3	0	3.3	.500	.000	.000	1.7	0.0	0.0	0.0	0.7
Hannah Sjerven^{‡}	3	0	3.0	.000	.000	.000	0.0	0.0	0.0	0.3	0.0

^{‡}Waived/Released during the season
^{†}Traded during the season
^{≠}Acquired during the season

== Awards and honors ==
Recipient	Award/Milestone	Date Awarded	Reference
Sylvia Fowles	WNBA All-Star Starter & Co-Captain	June 22	
Sylvia Fowles	Peak Performer:Rebounds	August 15	
Sylvia Fowles	Kim Perrot Sportsmanship Award	August 19	
Sylvia Fowles	All-Defensive First Team	August 30	
Sylvia Fowles	All-WNBA Second Team	September 15	
Aerial Powers	Western Conference Player of the Week	July 8	
