= Kaela Davis =

American basketball player (born 1995)

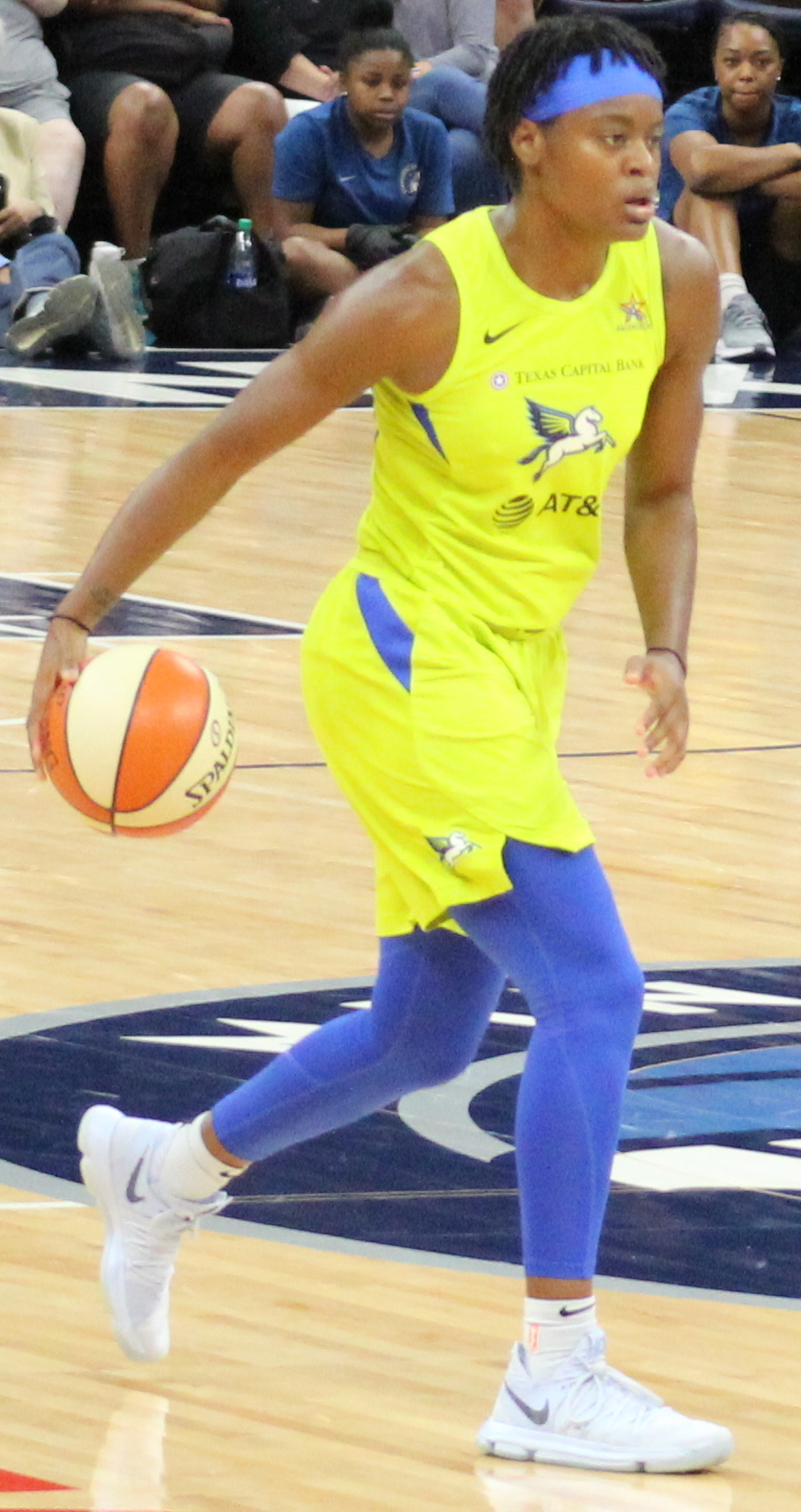
- Davis in 2019

Personal information
- Born: March 15, 1995 (age 31) Indianapolis, Indiana, U.S.
- Listed height: 6 ft 2 in (1.88 m)
- Listed weight: 180 lb (82 kg)

Career information
- High school: Buford (Buford, Georgia)
- College: Georgia Tech (2013–2015); South Carolina (2016–2017)
- WNBA draft: 2017: 1st round, 10th overall pick
- Drafted by: Dallas Wings
- Playing career: 2017–present
- Position: Small forward / shooting guard

Career history
- 2017–2020: Dallas Wings
- 2018: Galatasaray
- 2018–2019: Ramat HaSharon
- 2019–2020: Kayseri Basketbol
- 2020: Atlanta Dream
- 2020–2021: Maccabi Ra'anana
- 2021: CDB Clarinos Tenerife
- 2021–2022: Galatasaray
- 2022: Chicago Sky
- 2022: Seattle Storm
- 2022: Phoenix Mercury
- 2024: Chicago Sky

Career highlights
- EuroCup champion (2018); WNBA All-Rookie Team (2017); NCAA champion (2017); 2× SEC tournament champion (2016-2017); SEC Tournament MVP (2017); First-team All-ACC (2015); Second-team All-ACC (2014); ACC All-Freshman Team (2014); McDonald's All American (2013)
- Stats at Basketball Reference
Medals
Women's basketball
Representing the United States
FIBA Under-17 World Cup
Gold medal – first place	2012 Netherlands	Team
FIBA Americas Under-16 Championship
Gold medal – first place	2011 Mexico	Team
Women's 3x3 basketball
Representing the United States
FIBA 3x3 Under-18 World Cup
Gold medal – first place	2012 Spain	Team

Kaela Davis (born March 15, 1995) is an American professional basketball player who is currently a free agent. She previously played for the Chicago Sky, Dallas Wings, Atlanta Dream, Seattle Storm and the Phoenix Mercury of the Women's National Basketball Association (WNBA). She played college basketball for Georgia Tech before transferring to the University of South Carolina.

== College career ==
After helping lead South Carolina to the NCAA Championship, Davis opted to enter the 2017 WNBA draft. She was drafted 10th overall by the Dallas Wings.

== Professional career ==
On August 10, 2018, Davis signed with the Perth Lynx for the 2018–19 WNBL season. However, due to suffering with vertigo, she was unable to travel to Perth and thus the Lynx released Davis from her contract on September 4.

In August 2020, it was announced that Davis had reached a deal with the Atlanta Dream.

Davis signed a hardship contract with the Seattle Storm on May 13, 2022.

On July 21, 2022, Davis signed a 7-Day Hardship Contract with the Phoenix Mercury.

On September 11, 2024, Davis signed a hardship contract with the Chicago Sky.

== Career statistics ==
Legend
GP	Games played	GS	Games started	MPG	Minutes per game	RPG	Rebounds per game
APG	Assists per game	SPG	Steals per game	BPG	Blocks per game	PPG	Points per game
TO	Turnovers per game	FG%	Field-goal percentage	3P%	3-point field-goal percentage	FT%	Free-throw percentage
**Bold**	Career best	°	League leader

*	Denotes season(s) in which Davis won an NCAA Championship

=== WNBA ===
==== Regular season ====
Stats current through end of 2024 regular season

Kaela Davis WNBA Regular Season Statistics
Year	Team	GP	GS	MPG	FG%	3P%	FT%	RPG	APG	SPG	BPG	TO	PPG
2017	Dallas	**33**	0	15.5	.389	.429	.754	1.4	1.0	0.5	0.1	1.5	6.1
2018	Dallas	27	6	16.8	.347	.244	.641	2.0	1.4	0.3	0.0	1.3	5.0
2019	Dallas	**33**	**16**	**19.2**	.329	.314	.879	**2.2**	**2.1**	0.5	0.2	2.2	6.0
2020	Atlanta	2	0	1.0	—	—	—	0.0	0.0	0.0	0.0	**0.0**	0.0
2021	Did not play (waived)												
2022	Chicago	1	0	10.0	.000	—	—	1.0	1.0	0.0	0.0	2.0	0.0
2022	Seattle	1	0	18.0	.571	.667	**1.000**	2.0	0.0	**2.0**	0.0	1.0	**11.0**
2022	Phoenix	5	0	5.4	**.692**	.667	.750	1.2	0.0	0.0	0.0	0.6	4.6
2023	Did not appear in league												
2024	Chicago	4	0	13.0	.333	**1.000**	.500	1.0	0.3	0.3	**0.5**	1.0	3.0
**Career**	6 years, 5 teams	106	22	16.1	.362	.348	.747	1.8	1.3	0.4	0.1	1.6	5.5

=== Playoffs ===
Kaela Davis WNBA Playoff Statistics
Year	Team	GP	GS	MPG	FG%	3P%	FT%	RPG	APG	SPG	BPG	TO	PPG
2017	Dallas	1	0	3.0	.000	.000	.000	0.0	0.0	0.0	0.0	0.0	0.0
2022	Phoenix	**2**	0	**23.5**	**.483**	.000	**.800**	**3.5**	**1.5**	**0.5**	**0.5**	1.5	**16.0**
**Career**	2 years, 2 teams	3	0	16.7	.483	.000	.800	2.3	1.0	0.3	0.3	1.0	10.7

=== College ===
Kaela Davis NCAA Statistics
Year	Team	GP	GS	MPG	FG%	3P%	FT%	RPG	APG	SPG	BPG	TO	PPG
2013–14	Georgia Tech	32	32	30.5	.378	.346	.801	**5.6**	1.1	1.1	0.2	3.2	18.6
2014–15	Georgia Tech	34	33	**33.6**	.364	.289	.760	5.4	1.6	**1.5**	**0.2**	3.1	**19.2**
2015–16	South Carolina	Did not play (NCAA transfer rules)											
2016–17*	South Carolina	**37**	**36**	27.8	**.375**	**.349**	**.812**	3.9	**2.2**	0.9	0.0	**2.3**	12.7
**Career**		103	101	30.5	.372	.326	.789	4.9	1.7	1.2	0.1	2.8	16.7

== Overseas career ==
=== Galatasaray ===
In January 2018, Davis joined Turkish team Galatasaray. On 19 November 2021, she signed a one-year contract with Galatasaray.

== Personal life ==
Davis is the daughter of former NBA player, Antonio Davis. Davis has a twin brother, A. J., who played basketball at UCF and plays professionally overseas.

Davis’ godsister is Candace Parker.
