= Yvonne Turner =

American-Hungarian basketball player (born 1987)

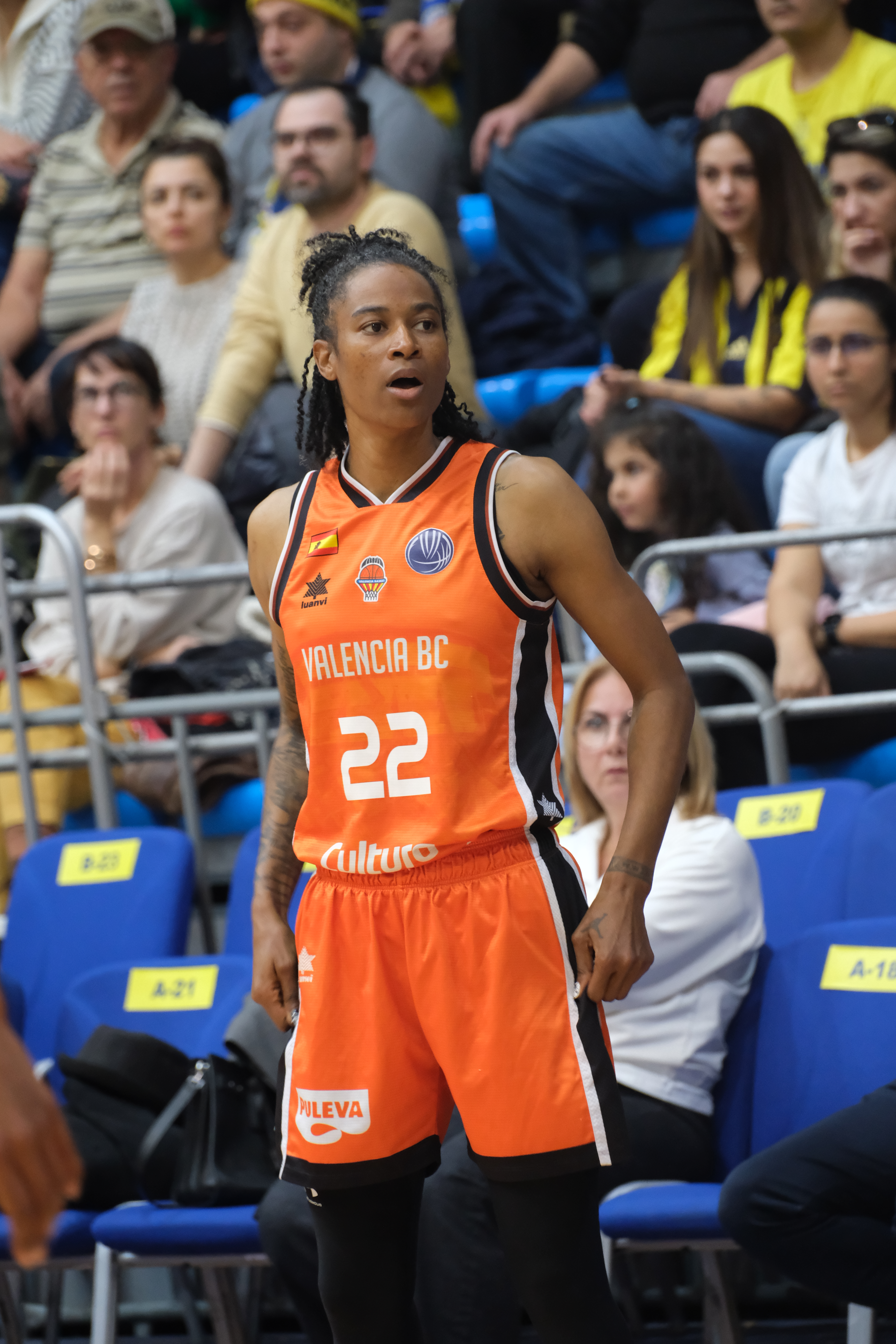

No. 22 – Valencia Basket
- Position: Guard
- League: Liga Femenina de Baloncesto

Personal information
- Born: October 13, 1987 (age 39) Omaha, Nebraska, U.S.
- Listed height: 5 ft 10 in (1.78 m)
- Listed weight: 127 lb (58 kg)

Career information
- High school: Bellevue East (Bellevue, Nebraska)
- College: Nebraska (2006–2010)
- WNBA draft: 2010: undrafted
- Playing career: 2010–present

Career history
- 2010–2012: Eisvögel USC Freiburg
- 2012–2013: WBC Dynamo Novosibirsk
- 2013–2014: Antakya Belediyespor
- 2015: CDB Zaragoza
- 2015–2016: Wisła Can-Pack Kraków
- 2016–2019: Sopron Basket
- 2017–2019: Phoenix Mercury
- 2019–2020: Nadezhda Orenburg
- 2020–2021: Flammes Carolo Basket
- 2021–2022: Çukurova Basketbol
- 2022: Minnesota Lynx
- 2022: Atlanta Dream
- 2022: Phoenix Mercury
- 2023: Seattle Storm
- 2023–2024: Sopron Basket
- 2024–present: Valencia Basket

Career highlights
- Big 12 Co-Defensive Player of the Year (2010); First-team All-Big 12 (2010); 3× Big 12 All-Defensive team (2008–2010)
- Stats at WNBA.com
- Stats at Basketball Reference

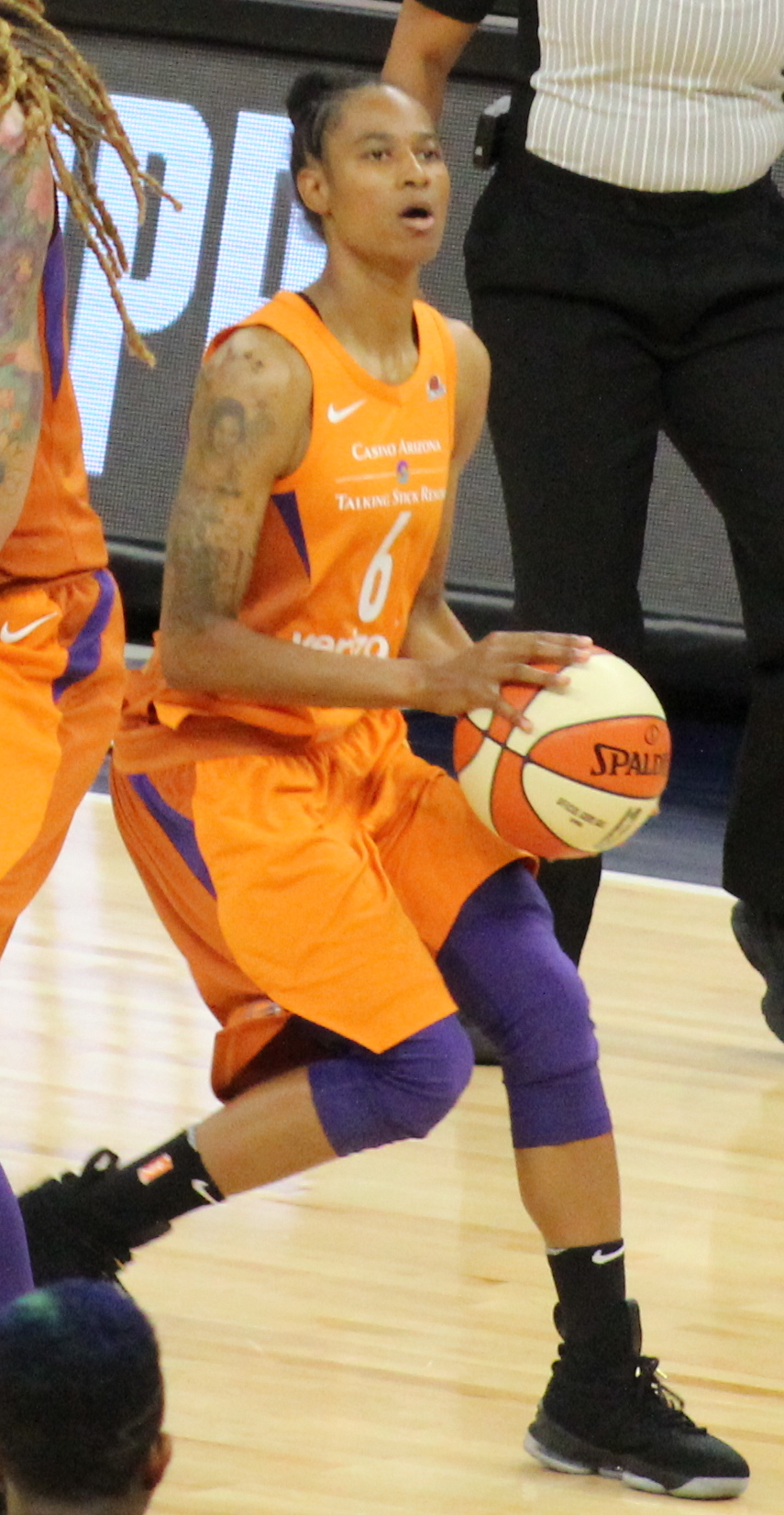

Yvonne Turner (born October 13, 1987) is an American-Hungarian professional basketball player for Valencia Basket of the Liga Femenina de Baloncesto. She played college basketball at Nebraska. Turner went undrafted in the 2010 WNBA draft, but went on to play five seasons in the league with the Phoenix Mercury, Minnesota Lynx, Atlanta Dream and Seattle Storm. She has also had a prolific international career, playing professionally in countries such as Australia, Ecuador, Germany, Hungary, Poland, Russia, Spain, and Turkey. During the 2016–17 season, she led the EuroLeague in scoring while playing for Uniqa Sopron.

== Nebraska Statistics ==
Legend
GP	Games played	GS	Games started	MPG	Minutes per game
FG%	Field goal percentage	3P%	3-point field goal percentage	FT%	Free throw percentage
RPG	Rebounds per game	APG	Assists per game	SPG	Steals per game
BPG	Blocks per game	PPG	Points per game	**Bold**	Career high

Year	Team	GP	Points	FG%	3P%	FT%	RPG	APG	SPG	BPG	PPG
2006-07	Nebraska	28	65	33.9%	25.9%	60.0%	1.6	0.7	0.6	0.1	2.3
2007-08	Nebraska	33	277	**44.4%**	32.5%	65.8%	3.3	2.3	**2.5**	**0.3**	8.4
2008-09	Nebraska	31	364	37.5%	31.8%	**70.4%**	3.4	**1.8**	2.2	0.3	**11.7**
2009-10	Nebraska	**34**	**395**	39.8%	**36.4%**	66.2%	**3.4**	1.6	1.9	0.1	11.6
Career		126	1101	39.7%	11.1%	66.9%	17.7	1.6	1.8	0.2	8.7

== Professional career ==
=== WNBA ===
==== Phoenix Mercury (2017–2019) ====
Turner made her WNBA debut in 2017 with Phoenix. She averaged 5.1 points and 12.8 minutes per game in her 34 appearances, which included four starts. Turner scored a season high of 18 on July 17 at Minnesota in a loss.

==== Minnesota Lynx (2022) ====
Turner signed a training camp contract on February 18, 2022, with the Minnesota Lynx. Turner was waived from camp on May 3, but was brought back on a hardship contract due to the Lynx having multiple players missing due to overseas commitments or injuries. Turner was released from her hardship contract with the Lynx on May 16, 2022.

==== Atlanta Dream (2022) ====
On June 23, 2022, Turner signed a hardship contract with the Dream. Turner appeared in 2 games for the Dream before being released from her Hardship Contract on June 27, 2022.

==== Phoenix Mercury (2022) ====
Turner signed with the Mercury on a Hardship Contract on August 8, 2022. The Mercury were able to sign her due to Diana Taurasi's season-ending injury.

==== Seattle Storm (2023) ====
Turned signed with the Seattle Storm for the 2023 season.

== WNBA career statistics ==
Legend
GP	Games played	GS	Games started	MPG	Minutes per game	RPG	Rebounds per game
APG	Assists per game	SPG	Steals per game	BPG	Blocks per game	PPG	Points per game
TO	Turnovers per game	FG%	Field-goal percentage	3P%	3-point field-goal percentage	FT%	Free-throw percentage
**Bold**	Career best	°	League leader

=== Regular season ===
Year	Team	GP	GS	MPG	FG%	3P%	FT%	RPG	APG	SPG	BPG	TO	PPG
2017	Phoenix	**34**	4	12.8	.410	.241	.763	1.0	1.1	0.6	0.0	1.1	5.1
2018	Phoenix	32	3	13.3	.376	.324	.682	1.8	1.3	**0.7**	**0.1**	**0.6**	4.1
2019	Phoenix	29	**14**	20.5	.343	.329	.878	**2.8**	2.3	0.6	**0.1**	2.0	**6.4**
2022	Minnesota	4	2	**22.0**	.308	**.429**	.857	2.5	**2.5**	0.5	0.0	3.0	6.3
2022	Atlanta	2	0	8.0	.000	—	.500	1.0	0.5	0.5	0.0	0.5	0.5
2022	Phoenix	3	0	11.7	.400	—	**1.000**	0.7	2.3	0.0	0.0	0.0	3.3
2023	Seattle	21	7	9.2	**.463**	.333	.778	1.1	0.9	0.4	**0.1**	0.7	2.5
Career	5 years, 4 teams	125	30	14.3	.379	.308	.797	1.7	1.5	0.6	0.1	1.1	4.7

=== Playoffs ===
Year	Team	GP	GS	MPG	FG%	3P%	FT%	RPG	APG	SPG	BPG	TO	PPG
2017	Phoenix	5	**5**	**23.8**	**.548**	**.529**	.857	2.4	1.6	**1.0**	0.0	1.0	**9.8**
2018	Phoenix	**7**	3	20.1	.432	.208	.556	1.9	2.0	**1.0**	**0.3**	**0.9**	6.9
2019	Phoenix	1	0	19.0	.200	.000	**1.000**	**4.0**	**3.0**	**1.0**	0.0	2.0	6.0
2022	Phoenix	2	1	12.0	.286	.000	.000	3.0	1.5	0.0	0.0	0.0	2.0
Career	4 years, 1 team	15	9	20.2	.448	.326	.750	2.3	1.9	0.9	0.1	0.9	7.1

== Personal ==
Turner grew up in Omaha, Nebraska and graduated from Bellevue East High School in Bellevue, Nebraska. She became one of the oldest players to make their debut in the WNBA when she signed with Phoenix.
