= Rennia Davis =

American basketball player (born 1999)

No. 99 – Beşiktaş
- Position: Forward
- League: Turkish Super League

Personal information
- Born: February 24, 1999 (age 27) Jacksonville, Florida, U.S.
- Listed height: 6 ft 1 in (1.85 m)
- Listed weight: 170 lb (77 kg)

Career information
- High school: Jean Ribault (Jacksonville, Florida)
- College: Tennessee (2017–2021)
- WNBA draft: 2021: 1st round, 9th overall pick
- Drafted by: Minnesota Lynx
- Playing career: 2021–present

Career history
- 2021–2022: Minnesota Lynx
- 2021–2022: Sydney Flames
- 2022: Elitzur Holon
- 2022: Panteras de Aguascalientes
- 2022: Indiana Fever
- 2022: Beşiktaş
- 2022–2023: Landerneau Bretagne Basket
- 2023–2024: Arka Gdynia
- 2024: Panteras de Aguascalientes
- 2024–2025: BC Polkowice
- 2025: Wuhan Shengfan
- 2025: El Calor de Cancún
- 2025–2026: Nesibe Aydın
- 2026: Jacksonville Waves
- 2026–present: Beşiktaş

Career highlights
- Senior CLASS Award (2021); 2× Honorable mention All-American – AP, USBWA, WBCA (2020, 2021); 2× First-team All-SEC – Coaches (2020, 2021); Second-team All-SEC – AP, Coaches (2019); SEC All-Freshman Team (2018); McDonald's All-American (2017)
- Stats at Basketball Reference

Rennia Tyi Davis (born February 24, 1999) is an American professional basketball player who plays for Beşiktaş of the Turkish Super League. She was drafted 9th in the 2021 WNBA draft by the Minnesota Lynx.

== Early life ==
Davis was born in Jacksonville, Florida, where she attended Jean Ribault High School. She was a McDonald's All-American and was ranked as the No. 12 overall recruit going into college.

== College ==
Davis played college basketball at the University of Tennessee, where she averaged 15.4 points and eight rebounds over four years. She started 116 of the 118 games she played. She finished her career top 10 in scoring, rebounds, double-doubles, points per game, rebounds per game, free-throw percentage, field goals attempted, and field goals made.

At the University of Tennessee, Davis was named the Tennessee Sports Writers Association Women's College Basketball Player of the Year for the 2020–21 school year. She was an honorable mention All American on the AP, World Exposure Report, USBWA, and WBCA lists that same year. The AP, USBWA, and WBCA gave her the same Honorable Mention in 2019–20. She was also named to the Coaches All-SEC First Team in 2019-2020 and 2020–21 and was named the SEC player of the week multiple times both years.

== College statistics ==
Legend
GP	Games played	GS	Games started	MPG	Minutes per game
FG%	Field goal percentage	3P%	3-point field goal percentage	FT%	Free throw percentage
RPG	Rebounds per game	APG	Assists per game	SPG	Steals per game
BPG	Blocks per game	PPG	Points per game	**Bold**	Career high

Year	Team	GP	Points	FG%	3P%	FT%	RPG	APG	SPG	BPG	PPG
2017–18	Tennessee	**33**	396	**.483**	.329	.740	7.6	1.7	1.1	0.3	12.0
2018–19	Tennessee	31	463	.456	**.370**	**.856**	7.7	1.4	**1.3**	0.3	14.9
2019–20	Tennessee	30	**541**	.469	.296	.802	8.2	**2.5**	0.9	**0.5**	**18.0**
2020–21	Tennessee	24	415	.480	.260	.853	**8.8**	2.3	0.8	0.3	17.3
Career		118	1,815	.471	.314	.816	8.0	2.0	1.1	0.4	15.4

== Professional career ==
=== Minnesota Lynx ===
Davis announced she was entering the WNBA draft in early April 2021.

Davis was selected 9th Overall in the First Round of the 2021 WNBA draft by the Minnesota Lynx. She became the 43rd Tennessee women's basketball player to be drafted into the WNBA, the 14th taken in the top 10, and the highest since Diamond DeShields in 2018.

Davis was injured in May 2021 when a stress fracture in her foot put her out indefinitely.

Davis was waived from the Lynx training camp in 2022, but later returned on a hardship contract. She appeared in 1 game and scored her first career WNBA points against the Indiana Fever. On May 12, 2022, Davis was released from her hardship contract.

=== Indiana Fever ===
On July 15, 2022, Davis signed with the Indiana Fever. Davis played the rest of the 2022 season with the Fever appearing in 7 games. Davis was waived by the Fever during training camp prior to the 2023 season.

=== Seattle Storm ===
During the 2026 preseason, Davis played for the Seattle Storm. She was waived on May 8, 2026.

=== Jacksonville Waves ===
On May 11, 2026, the Jacksonville Waves of the UpShot League announced the addition of Davis to their inaugural roster.

== WNBA career stats ==
=== Regular season ===
Year	Team	GP	GS	MPG	FG%	3P%	FT%	RPG	APG	SPG	BPG	TO	PPG
2022	Minnesota	1	0	3.0	**1.000**	.000	.000	0.0	0.0	0.0	0.0	0.0	**2.0**
2022	Indiana	**7**	0	**5.7**	.333	.000	.000	**1.1**	**0.1**	**0.3**	0.0	0.4	1.1
Career	1 year, 2 teams	8	0	5.4	.385	.000	.000	1.0	0.1	0.3	0.0	0.5	1.3
