= Reshanda Gray =

American basketball player (born 1993)

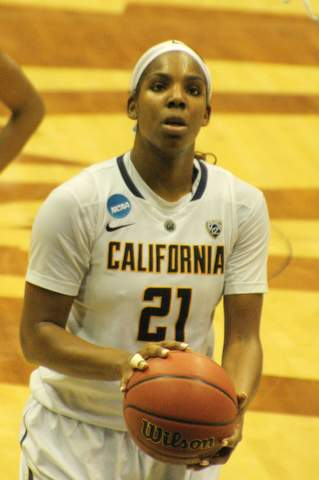
- Gray with the California Golden Bears in 2015

Personal information
- Born: June 1, 1993 (age 33) Los Angeles, California, U.S.
- Listed height: 6 ft 2 in (1.88 m)
- Listed weight: 192 lb (87 kg)

Career information
- High school: Washington Prep (Los Angeles, California)
- College: California (2011–2015)
- WNBA draft: 2015: 2nd round, 16th overall pick
- Drafted by: Minnesota Lynx
- Playing career: 2015–2022
- Position: Power forward
- Number: 21, 12, 1, 22

Career history
- 2015: Minnesota Lynx
- 2015–2016: Atlanta Dream
- 2015–2017: Dike Napoli
- 2017–2019: Incheon Shinhan Bank S-Birds
- 2018–2019: New York Liberty
- 2019–2020: Asan Woori Bank Wibee
- 2020: Los Angeles Sparks
- 2021: New York Liberty
- 2022: Seattle Storm
- 2022: Phoenix Mercury

Career highlights
- Third-team All-American – AP (2015); Pac-12 Player of the Year (2015); 2x All Pac-12 Team (2014, 2015); Pac-12 All-Freshman team (2012); McDonald's All-American (2011)
- Stats at Basketball Reference
Medals
Women's basketball
Representing United States
World University Games
Gold medal – first place	2013 Kazan	Team
FIBA Under-18 Americas Championship
Gold medal – first place	2010 United States	Team

Reshanda Gray (born June 1, 1993) is an American professional basketball player who plays both in the Women's National Basketball Association (WNBA) and internationally. She played college basketball for the California Golden Bears and was named the Pac-12 Conference Player of the Year as a senior in 2015. She was drafted by the Minnesota Lynx in the 2015 WNBA draft.

== Early life ==
Born in Los Angeles, California, Gray grew up in a low-income family, moving from place to place. At age 11, she and her six siblings settled in a one-room apartment long-term. She and her siblings were put into foster care, due to her parents drug use. She attended Bret Harte Middle School, where she first played basketball. After middle school she attended Washington Prep, where she played volleyball, track, and basketball.

== College career ==
At the University of California, Berkeley, Gray helped lead the Golden Bears to its first NCAA Final Four in 2013. In the 2013-14 season she scored 43 points and 16 rebounds against Washington State. She ended that season averaging 17.6 points and 9 rebounds. In her senior season of 2014–15, Gray was named Pac-12 Player of the Year by the league's head coaches, although she would lose out to Oregon State's Ruth Hamblin for the media version of the award.

=== California statistics ===
Legend
GP	Games played	GS	Games started	MPG	Minutes per game
FG%	Field goal percentage	3P%	3-point field goal percentage	FT%	Free throw percentage
RPG	Rebounds per game	APG	Assists per game	SPG	Steals per game
BPG	Blocks per game	PPG	Points per game	**Bold**	Career high

Year	Team	GP	Points	FG%	3P%	FT%	RPG	APG	SPG	BPG	PPG
2011-12	California	**35**	367	53.3%	**100.0%**	68.0%	6.0	0.3	0.4	0.5	10.5
2012-13	California	33	273	51.0%	0.0%	65.1%	5.2	0.2	0.5	0.3	8.3
2013-14	California	32	539	**59.1%**	0.0%	**74.1%**	**8.8**	**0.8**	**0.7**	0.4	16.8
2014-15	California	34	**590**	56.8%	50.0%	68.8%	7.1	0.5	0.6	**1.0**	**17.4**
Career		134	1769	55.8%	40.0%	69.4%	6.7	0.4	0.5	0.6	13.2

== Professional career ==
=== WNBA ===
Gray was drafted with the 16th pick in the second round of the 2015 WNBA draft by the Minnesota Lynx. After 10 games played with the Lynx, Gray was acquired by the Atlanta Dream along with teammate Damiris Dantas in a three-team trade deal that sent Érika de Souza to the Chicago Sky and Sylvia Fowles to the Lynx midway through the season. For the rest of the season, Gray averaged a career-high in scoring for the Dream as a reserve. During the 2016 season, Gray had career highs in scoring and rebounding in a win against the Dallas Wings where she scored 22 points along with 10 rebounds in one of her five starts of the season for the Dream. On January 26, 2017, Gray was traded to the Connecticut Sun in exchange for Aneika Henry. In May 2017, Gray was waived by the Sun following training camp. On February 28, 2018, the New York Liberty signed Gray to a training camp contract.

Gray spent the 2019 season with the Liberty, partaking in her first regular season action since 2016. Along with All-Star guard Kia Nurse, she was one of two players to partake in each of the Liberty's 34 games that season. Gray reached double-figures in scoring in each of her first three games. On June 28, Gray sank the winning free throw and posted a double-double in the Liberty's 69–68 win over the Dallas Wings. Two days later, Gray put up a career-best 15 rebounds in a win over Atlanta. The year ended with Gray posting matching career-best averages of 5.2 points and rebounds a game. Gray was waived by the Liberty on May 26, 2020.

The following season, Gray signed with the Los Angeles Sparks.

=== Overseas ===
In the 2015-16 WNBA off-season, Gray played in Italy for Dike Napoli. In August 2016, Gray re-signed with Dike Napoli for the 2016-17 WNBA off-season. In 2017, Gray signed with the Incheon Shinhan Bank S-Birds of the South Korean league for the 2017-18 WNBA off-season. In 2018, Gray signed with the Uni Győr of the Hungarian league for the 2018-19 WNBA off-season. 2019-2020 South Korean League (WKBL) was drafted with the 4th pick in the second round of the 2019-20 WKBL Draft by the Asan Woori Bank Wibee

== Career statistics ==
Legend
GP	Games played	GS	Games started	MPG	Minutes per game	RPG	Rebounds per game
APG	Assists per game	SPG	Steals per game	BPG	Blocks per game	PPG	Points per game
TO	Turnovers per game	FG%	Field-goal percentage	3P%	3-point field-goal percentage	FT%	Free-throw percentage
**Bold**	Career best	°	League leader

=== WNBA ===
==== Regular season ====
WNBA regular season statistics
Year	Team	GP	GS	MPG	FG%	3P%	FT%	RPG	APG	SPG	BPG	TO	PPG
2015	Minnesota	10	0	3.7	.429	.000	.000	1.0	0.1	0.2	0.2	**0.4**	0.6
2015	Atlanta	17	1	14.8	.493	.000	.733	2.8	0.2	0.4	0.4	0.9	5.9
2016	Atlanta	28	5	9.6	.521	.000	.556	2.5	0.1	0.1	0.1	0.6	3.4
2019	New York	**34**	**10**	**15.3**	.473	.500	.565	**5.2**	0.5	**0.5**	0.2	1.2	5.2
2020	Los Angeles	10	0	6.2	.364	.000	**.857**	2.8	0.3	0.1	**0.4**	1.0	1.4
2021	New York	15	0	14.0	**.531**	.222	.692	3.5	0.3	0.3	0.3	1.4	**5.9**
2022	Seattle	11	0	7.7	.500	**.667**	.833	2.2	0.1	0.2	0.0	0.8	2.5
2022	Phoenix	16	0	9.5	.405	.091	.333	1.8	**0.6**	0.3	0.3	1.1	2.0
**Career**	6 years, 6 teams	141	16	11.2	.485	.231	.628	3.1	0.3	0.3	0.2	1.0	3.8

==== Playoffs ====
WNBA playoff statistics
Year	Team	GP	GS	MPG	FG%	3P%	FT%	RPG	APG	SPG	BPG	TO	PPG
2016	Atlanta	**2**	0	3.5	.000	.000	.000	0.5	0.0	0.0	0.0	**0.0**	0.0
2020	Los Angeles	1	0	1.0	**1.000**	.000	.000	1.0	0.0	**1.0**	0.0	**0.0**	2.0
2021	New York	1	0	**9.0**	**1.000**°	**1.000**	**1.000**	**2.0**	**1.0**	**1.0**	0.0	2.0	**8.0**
2022	Phoenix	**2**	0	8.0	.400	.000	.500	1.0	0.0	0.0	0.0	0.5	2.5
**Career**	4 years, 4 teams	6	0	5.5	.545	1.000	.667	1.0	0.2	0.3	0.0	0.5	2.5

== Personal life ==
Gray has three brothers and three sisters.
