= Elissa Cunane =

American basketball player (born 2000)

Providence Friars
- Title: Assistant coach
- League: Big East Conference

Personal information
- Born: September 25, 2000 (age 26) Summerfield, North Carolina, U.S.
- Listed height: 6 ft 5 in (1.96 m)
- Listed weight: 190 lb (86 kg)

Career information
- High school: Northern Guilford (Greensboro, North Carolina)
- College: NC State (2018–2022)
- WNBA draft: 2022: 2nd round, 17th overall pick
- Drafted by: Seattle Storm
- Playing career: 2022–2025
- Position: Center / power forward
- Number: 33
- Coaching career: 2025–present

Career history

Playing
- 2022: Minnesota Lynx
- 2022–2025: BK Žabiny Brno

Coaching
- 2025–present: Providence (assistant)

Career highlights
- 2x Second-team All-American – AP, USBWA (2021, 2022); WBCA Coaches' All-American (2022); Third-team All-American – AP, USBWA (2020); 3× First-team All-ACC (2020–2022); 2x ACC tournament MVP (2021, 2022); ACC All-Freshman Team (2019)
- Stats at Basketball Reference
Medals
Women's basketball
the United States
FIBA AmeriCup
Gold medal – first place	2021 Puerto Rico	Team

Elissa Cunane (el-EE-sa; born September 25, 2000) is an American professional basketball player for BK Žabiny Brno of the Czech Women's Basketball League. She played college basketball at NC State. She was drafted by the Seattle Storm in the 2022 WNBA draft.

== College career ==
=== Freshman season ===
Cunane came off the bench in her freshman season for majority of the season while also coming back from a foot fracture she suffered in high school. Despite being a bench player, she often played in late-game situations and was a key player towards the end of the Wolfpack's season, starting after an injury to regular starter Erika Cassell.

=== Sophomore season ===
Cunane started 31 of the 32 games she appeared in, averaging a near double-double as she also earned third-team All-American honors. She also set a NC State single-season record for most made free throws with 159.

=== Junior season ===
In her junior season, Cunane started all 23 games she appeared in, despite missing a month recovering from COVID-19. In her return, she put up 16 points and 6 rebounds in a 74–60 win against No. 1 ranked Louisville.

=== Senior season ===
Cunane enters her senior season as one of the top prospects in the 2022 WNBA draft.

== College statistics ==
Year	Team	GP	Points	FG%	3P%	FT%	RPG	APG	SPG	BPG	PPG
2018–19	NC State	34	464	.549	.333	.760	6.3	1.1	0.3	0.8	13.6
2019–20	NC State	32	524	.547	.447	.791	9.6	1.1	0.3	1.1	16.4
2020–21	NC State	23	374	.533	.387	.843	8.3	1.8	0.7	0.9	16.3
2021–22	NC State	36	493	.531	.419	.835	7.6	1.3	0.7	0.9	13.7
Career		125	1855	.540	.411	.802	7.9	1.3	0.5	0.9	14.8

== National team career ==
Cunane represented the United States at the 2021 FIBA AmeriCup, where they won gold. She was named to the AmeriCup's All-Star team after averaging 12.8 points and eight rebounds during the tournament.

== Professional career ==
Cunane was drafted by the Seattle Storm in the second round. She was cut after playing in two preseason games.

=== Minnesota Lynx ===
Cunane signed a hardship contract with the Lynx on May 31, 2022. She made her WNBA debut on June 1, 2022, against the Atlanta Dream. On June 21, 2022, Cunane was released from her hardship contract. She appeared in 3 games for the Lynx.

=== Golden State Valkyries ===
Cunane signed a training camp contract with Golden State Valkyries on February 6, 2025.

== Coaching career ==
Cunane was hired as an assistant coach at Providence prior to the start of the 2025–26 season under coach Erin Batth.

== WNBA career statistics ==
Legend
GP	Games played	GS	Games started	MPG	Minutes per game	RPG	Rebounds per game
APG	Assists per game	SPG	Steals per game	BPG	Blocks per game	PPG	Points per game
TO	Turnovers per game	FG%	Field-goal percentage	3P%	3-point field-goal percentage	FT%	Free-throw percentage
**Bold**	Career best	°	League leader

=== Regular season ===
Year	Team	GP	GS	MPG	FG%	3P%	FT%	RPG	APG	SPG	BPG	TO	PPG
2022	Minnesota	3	0	3.3	.500	.000	.000	1.7	0.0	0.0	0.0	0.3	0.7
Career	1 year, 1 team	3	0	3.3	.500	.000	.000	1.7	0.0	0.0	0.0	0.3	0.7

== Czech league career statistics ==
Legend
GP	Games played	GS	Games started	MPG	Minutes per game	RPG	Rebounds per game
APG	Assists per game	SPG	Steals per game	BPG	Blocks per game	PPG	Points per game
TO	Turnovers per game	FG%	Field-goal percentage	3P%	3-point field-goal percentage	FT%	Free-throw percentage
**Bold**	Career best	°	League leader

Year	Team	GP	PPG	FG%	3P%	FT%	APG	RPG	SPG	BPG
2022/23	BK Žabiny Brno	25	12.1	53.5	14.3	77.8	5.6	8.9	0.7	0.5
2023/24	BK Žabiny Brno	31	**14.3**	63.2	**39.0**	80.5	**7.5**	**11.1**	0.6	0.4
2024/25	BK Žabiny Brno	30	13.0	**67.5**	28.9	**83.2**	5.9	8.4°	**0.8**	**0.6**

== Personal life ==
Cunane is the daughter of Dan and Sharon Cunane and sister to older sibling William Paul. Dan is a former Greensboro police sergeant who suffered an injury in a bicycle accident when Elissa was two, initially paralyzing him from the neck down. He has since regained some use of his lower body and arms, but still uses a wheelchair to get around.
