= Leaonna Odom =

American basketball player (born 1998)

Personal information
- Born: March 26, 1998 (age 28) Lompoc, California, U.S.
- Listed height: 6 ft 1 in (1.85 m)
- Listed weight: 172 lb (78 kg)

Career information
- High school: Chaminade College Prep (Los Angeles, California)
- College: Duke (2016–2020)
- WNBA draft: 2020: 2nd round, 15th overall pick
- Drafted by: New York Liberty
- Playing career: 2020–present
- Position: Small forward

Career history
- 2020–2021: New York Liberty
- 2025: Crvena zvezda

Career highlights
- ACC All-Freshman Team (2017); McDonald's All-American (2016)
- Stats at Basketball Reference

Leaonna Laneah Odom (born March 26, 1998) is an American professional basketball player who is a free agent. She played college basketball for the Duke Blue Devils.

== Early life ==
Odom started her high school basketball career at Los Alamitos High School where she averaged 14.3 points and 8.8 rebounds in her freshman season. She moved to Mater Dei for her sophomore season. She played the remainder of her high school basketball career at Chaminade College Prep where she averaged 21.5 points, 9.9 rebounds, 2.5 assists, 1.5 steals and 2.1 blocks in her senior year. She participated in the 2016 McDonald's All-American game in Chicago and the 2016 Jordan Brand Classic in New York where she scored 13 points, 3 rebounds and 2 blocks.

== College career ==
Odom played college basketball for the Duke Blue Devils from 2016 to 2020. In her freshman season, she averaged 8.1 points, 4.6 rebounds and 0.7 assists per game. In her Sophomore season, she averaged 9.6 points, 6.3 rebounds and 1.7 assists per game. In her junior year, she averaged 13.1 points, 6.4 rebounds and 2.5 assists per game. In her senior year, she averaged 14.3 points, 6.2 rebounds and 1.3 assists per game. Her 54.7-percent shooting from the floor ranked fourth in the Atlantic Coast Conference.

=== Duke statistics ===
Ratios
YEAR	Team	GP	FG%	3P%	FT%	RBG	APG	BPG	SPG	PPG
2016–17	Duke	34	54.2%	–	63.9%	4.59	0.71	0.94	1.15	8.12
2017–18	Duke	33	52.9%	–	59.7%	6.27	1.67	1.15	1.09	9.64
2018–19	Duke	30	50.6%	–	58.9%	6.40	2.53	0.90	1.63	13.13
2019–20	Duke	28	54.7%	37.5%	62.0%	6.21	1.64	0.61	1.86	14.25
Career		125	53.0%	25.0%	61.0%	5.83	1.61	0.91	1.41	11.10

Totals
YEAR	Team	GP	FG	FGA	3P	3PA	FT	FTA	REB	A	BK	ST	PTS
2016–17	Duke	34	115	212	0	2	46	72	156	24	32	39	276
2017–18	Duke	33	139	263	0	1	40	67	207	55	38	36	318
2018–19	Duke	30	169	334	0	1	56	95	192	76	27	49	394
2019–20	Duke	28	176	322	3	8	44	71	174	46	17	52	399
Career		125	599	1131	3	12	186	305	729	201	114	176	1387

== Professional career ==
On April 17, 2020, the New York Liberty selected Odom as the 15th pick in the 2020 WNBA draft.

== WNBA career statistics ==
Legend
GP	Games played	GS	Games started	MPG	Minutes per game	RPG	Rebounds per game
APG	Assists per game	SPG	Steals per game	BPG	Blocks per game	PPG	Points per game
TO	Turnovers per game	FG%	Field-goal percentage	3P%	3-point field-goal percentage	FT%	Free-throw percentage
**Bold**	Career best	°	League leader

=== Regular season ===
Year	Team	GP	GS	MPG	FG%	3P%	FT%	RPG	APG	SPG	BPG	TO	PPG
2020	New York	**22**	**16**	**20.6**	**.490**	.250	**.870**	**2.3**	**0.7**	**0.7**	**0.4'**	0.7	**5.5**
2021	New York	18	0	12.1	.467	**.294**	.750	1.2	0.4	0.3	0.3	**0.6**	3.1
Career	2 years, 1 team	40	16	16.8	.483	.270	.829	1.8	0.6	0.5	0.3	0.6	4.4
