= Stephanie Jones (basketball) =

American basketball player (born 1998)

Personal information
- Born: July 10, 1998 (age 27) Havre de Grace, Maryland, U.S.
- Listed height: 6 ft 2 in (1.88 m)

Career information
- High school: Aberdeen (Aberdeen, Maryland)
- College: Maryland (2016–2020)
- WNBA draft: 2020: undrafted
- Playing career: 2020–present
- Position: Forward (basketball)
- Number: 24

Career history
- 2020: Ślęza Wrocław
- 2021: Connecticut Sun
- 2022: Washington Mystics
- 2022: Connecticut Sun
- Stats at Basketball Reference

Stephanie Jones (born July 7, 1998) is an American basketball player. She has played for the Washington Mystics and the Connecticut Sun.

== Early life ==
Jones played high school basketball at Aberdeen and helped lead them to two state championships as a freshman and a junior. During her season season, she averaged 28.4 points, 12 rebounds, 6.3 assists, 3.7 steals, and 2 blocks. She suffered a torn ACL in January of her senior year. Jones was named to the Naismith Trophy Watch List and was the #51 overall player in her class.

== College ==
=== Maryland ===
Jones played a limited role in her freshman season only averaging 9.1 minutes with 0 starts and scoring 4.1 points per game. Her next three years saw her role and time increase. She jumped up to 24.1 minutes a game in her sophomore season and started every game. During her senior season, she averaged 11.3 points and 6.2 rebounds on her way to being named All-Big Ten Second Team. She also received the Big Ten Sportsmanship Award and Big Ten Outstanding Sportsmanship Award – both in 2020.

=== Maryland statistics ===
Ratios
Year	Team	GP	FG%	3P%	FT%	RBG	APG	BPG	SPG	PPG
2016–17	Maryland	34	60.2%	–	37.8%	2.00	0.32	0.06	0.47	4.06
2017–18	Maryland	34	58.8%	–	71.6%	6.53	0.94	0.88	1.62	10.79
2018–19	Maryland	34	59.0%	33.3%	77.1%	6.03	0.85	0.68	1.06	12.79
2019–20	Maryland	32	60.1%	28.6%	75.9%	6.19	0.94	0.72	1.38	11.31
Career		134	59.4%	25.0%	70.0%	5.17	0.76	0.58	1.13	9.72

Totals
Year	Team	GP	FG	FGA	3P	3PA	FT	FTA	REB	A	BK	ST	PTS
2016–17	Maryland	34	62	103	0	0	14	37	68	11	2	16	138
2017–18	Maryland	34	147	250	0	2	73	102	222	32	30	55	367
2018–19	Maryland	34	180	305	1	3	74	96	205	29	23	36	435
2019–20	Maryland	32	158	263	2	7	44	58	198	30	23	44	362
Career		134	547	921	3	12	205	293	693	102	78	151	1302

== WNBA career ==
Jones went undrafted in the 2020 WNBA draft.

=== Connecticut Sun ===
Jones signed a training camp contract with the Sun in 2021. She made her WNBA debut on May 14, 2021, against the Atlanta Dream and scored 4 points and grabbed 2 rebounds in 13 minutes.

On May 4, 2022, Jones was waived from the Connecticut Sun and did not make their 2022 Opening Day roster.

== WNBA career statistics ==
Legend
GP	Games played	GS	Games started	MPG	Minutes per game	RPG	Rebounds per game
APG	Assists per game	SPG	Steals per game	BPG	Blocks per game	PPG	Points per game
TO	Turnovers per game	FG%	Field-goal percentage	3P%	3-point field-goal percentage	FT%	Free-throw percentage
**Bold**	Career best	°	League leader

=== Regular season ===
Year	Team	GP	GS	MPG	FG%	3P%	FT%	RPG	APG	SPG	BPG	TO	PPG
2021	Connecticut	**18**	0	5.5	.414	.000	.500	**1.2**	0.2	0.1	**0.1**	0.2	1.4
2022	Washington	3	0	**6.3**	**.429**	**.500**	.000	0.7	**0.3**	0.3	0.0	**0.0**	**2.3**
2022	Connecticut	2	0	4.0	.000	.000	**1.000**	0.0	**0.5**	0.0	0.0	**0.0**	1.0
Career	2 years, 2 teams	23	0	5.5	.405	.250	.750	1.0	0.2	0.1	0.0	0.1	1.5

=== Postseason ===
Year	Team	GP	GS	MPG	FG%	3P%	FT%	RPG	APG	SPG	BPG	TO	PPG
2021	Connecticut	1	0	1.0	.000	.000	.000	0.0	0.0	0.0	0.0	0.0	0.0
Career	1 year, 1 team	1	0	1.0	.000	.000	.000	0.0	0.0	0.0	0.0	0.0	0.0

== Personal life ==
Jones's sister, Brionna Jones, is a member of the Atlanta Dream.
