= Jasmine Dickey =

American basketball player (born 2000)

No. 23 – Keflavík
- Position: Guard/forward
- League: Úrvalsdeild kvenna

Personal information
- Born: February 23, 2000 (age 26) Baltimore, Maryland, U.S.
- Listed height: 5 ft 9 in (1.75 m)
- Listed weight: 147 lb (67 kg)

Career information
- High school: Catonsville (Catonsville, Maryland)
- College: Delaware (2018–2022)
- WNBA draft: 2022: 3rd round, 30th overall pick
- Drafted by: Dallas Wings
- Playing career: 2022–present

Career history
- 2022–2023: Dallas Wings
- 2023: Mainland Pouākai
- 2023–2024: Southside Flyers
- 2024–present: Keflavík

Career highlights
- WNBL champion (2024); CAA Tournament MVP (2022); 2× CAA Player of the Year (2021, 2022); 2× First-team All-CAA (2021, 2022); 2× CAA All-Defensive Team (2020, 2021); CAA All-Rookie Team (2019)
- Stats at Basketball Reference

Jasmine Dickey (born February 23, 2000) is an American professional basketball player. She played college basketball at Delaware. She was drafted in the Third Round of the 2022 WNBA draft by the Dallas Wings.

== High school ==
Dickey helped lead Catonsville High School to the school's first ever state championship in 2017 for Class 4A, as well as a runner-up finish in 2018. She scored a game-high 30 points in the 2017 championship game. Dickey was also a 2-time Maryland Basketball Coaches Association Ms. Basketball.

== College career ==
Dickey committed to the Delaware Blue Hens in September 2017.

Dickey began her first two-season averaging 7.9 and 12.6 points in her freshman and sophomore season, respectively. She was named to the All-Rookie team during her freshman campaign, as well. Her increase in production also earned her a spot on the All-CAA Second Team in her sophomore year.

During her sophomore year, Dickey scored her 1,000th career point against James Madison. She was also the second-leading scorer in the conference, as well as the 12th overall in the entire NCAA with an average of 22.6 points. For the year, Dickey averaged 22.6 points, 9.1 rebounds, and 1.9 assists, which earned her the CAA Player of the Year award.

Dickey didn't stop scoring in her senior year. She averaged 25.3 points and 10.2 rebounds this time - which earned her a 2nd CAA Player of the Year. She was the first Delaware player to earn back to back Player of the Year awards since Elena Delle Donne did it in 2012 and 2013. Dickey was also named a finalist for the Becky Hammon Mid-Major Player of the Year Award. Dickey and the Blue Hens reached the NCAA Tournament in her senior year. She scored 31 points against Maryland, but the Blue Hens ultimately ended up losing, and Dickey's Delaware career was over.

== College statistics ==
Year	Team	GP	Points	FG%	3P%	FT%	RPG	APG	SPG	BPG	PPG
2018–19	Delaware	23	182	.340	.000	.603	8.3	0.8	1.3	0.9	7.9
2019–20	Delaware	29	360	.380	.231	.693	9.2	1.9	1.8	0.6	12.4
2020–21	Delaware	29	360	.390	.250	.794	9.1	1.9	2.4	0.6	22.6
2021–22	Delaware	31	781	.401	.313	.809	10.2	2.1	1.9	0.9	25.2
Career		112	1979	.387	.282	.762	9.3	1.7	1.9	0.7	11.8

== Professional career ==
=== Dallas Wings ===
Dickey was selected in the Third Round of the 2022 WNBA draft by the Dallas Wings. She was selected with the 30th pick overall. She was the third player ever chosen in the WNBA Draft from Delaware - joining Tyresa Smith and Elena Delle Donne.

Dickey returned to Dallas for her second season, making the 2023 Opening Night roster. On June 28, 2023, Dickey was waived from the Wings.

In July 2024, Dickey signed with Keflavík of the Icelandic Úrvalsdeild kvenna.

== WNBA career statistics ==
Legend
GP	Games played	GS	Games started	MPG	Minutes per game	RPG	Rebounds per game
APG	Assists per game	SPG	Steals per game	BPG	Blocks per game	PPG	Points per game
TO	Turnovers per game	FG%	Field-goal percentage	3P%	3-point field-goal percentage	FT%	Free-throw percentage
**Bold**	Career best	°	League leader

=== Regular season ===
Year	Team	GP	GS	MPG	FG%	3P%	FT%	RPG	APG	SPG	BPG	TO	PPG
2022	Dallas	**20**	0	4.7	.212	**.250**	**.667**	0.6	**0.1**	0.2	**0.1**	**0.3**	1.1
2023	Dallas	14	0	**6.2**	**.382**	.000	.500	**0.8**	**0.1**	**0.3**	**0.1**	0.4	**2.1**
Career	2 years, 1 team	34	0	5.3	.299	.200	.600	0.7	0.1	0.2	0.1	0.3	1.5

=== Playoffs ===
Year	Team	GP	GS	MPG	FG%	3P%	FT%	RPG	APG	SPG	BPG	TO	PPG
2022	Dallas	1	0	2.0	.000	.000	.000	0.0	0.0	0.0	0.0	0.0	0.0
Career	1 year, 1 team	1	0	2.0	.000	.000	.000	0.0	0.0	0.0	0.0	0.0	0.0
