= 2022 Atlanta Dream season =

- Head coach: Tanisha Wright
- Arena: Gateway Center Arena

Results
- Record: 14–22 (.389)
- Place: 5th (Eastern)
- Playoff finish: Did not qualify

The 2022 WNBA season was the 15th season for the Atlanta Dream of the Women's National Basketball Association. The team began the season on May 14, 2022, on the road against the Dallas Wings.

This was the first season for new head coach Tanisha Wright. Wright was hired on October 12, 2021. Dan Padover was hired as the team's new general manager, while Darius Taylor moved into the assistant general manager role - after serving as the team's interim head coach in the 2021 season.

The season stated well for Wright and the Dream, as they finished May 5–3. However, a stronger schedule in June slowed down their momentum as they finished the month 4–8, including a four game and three game losing streak. The Dream's struggles continued in July as they finished the month 3–7. One bright spot in the month was a win over regular season champions Las Vegas, in Las Vegas. The team lost their last four games of the season and finished 2–4 in August. They finished in tenth place overall, missing the playoffs by one game. Their fourteen wins were the most in a season since 2018 for the team.

== Transactions ==
=== WNBA draft ===
Round	Pick	Player	Nationality	School/team/country
1	1	Rhyne Howard	United States	Kentucky
2	15	Naz Hillmon	United States	Michigan

=== Trades and Roster Changes ===
Date	Transaction
October 12, 2021	Hired Tanisha Wright as head coach
December 23, 2021	Renounced the rights to Mengran Sun
January 4, 2022	Extended Qualifying Offers to Monique Billings and Jaylyn Agnew
January 6, 2022	Signed Jaylyn Agnew to a Qualifying Offer
January 13, 2022	Waived Tianna Hawkins
January 16, 2022	Suspended Maite Cazorla for Full-Season
January 18, 2022	Claimed Megan Walker off of Waivers
January 31, 2022	Traded a 2023 Third Round Pick to the Phoenix Mercury in exchange for Kia Vaughn
February 1, 2022	Re-Signed Tiffany Hayes to a One-Year Deal
February 1, 2022	Signed Nia Coffey to a One-Year Deal
February 3, 2022	Re-Signed Monique Billings to a One-Year Deal
February 5, 2022	Traded Chennedy Carter and the rights to Li Yueru to the Los Angeles Sparks in exchange for Erica Wheeler, a 2023 First-Round Pick, and a 2022 Second Round Pick
February 15, 2022	Signed N'dea Jones and Khaalia Hillsman to training-camp contracts
February 21, 2022	Signed Kristy Wallace to a Rookie Contract
February 23, 2022	Signed Maya Caldwell to a training-camp contract
March 29, 2022	Hired Christie Sides, Paul Goriss and Barbara Turner as assistant coaches
April 6, 2022	Traded the #3 and #14 picks in the 2022 WNBA Draft, and the right to exchange 1st round picks with the Los Angeles Sparks (from the Erica Wheeler trade) to the Washington Mystics in exchange for the #1 pick in the 2022 WNBA Draft
April 12, 2022	Signed Que Morrison to a training-camp contract
April 18, 2022	Signed Rhyne Howard and Naz Hillmon to rookie-scale contracts
April 22, 2022	Waived Khaalia Hillsmon
April 23, 2022	Waived Que Morrison
April 25, 2022	Waived N'dea Jones
April 27, 2022	Waived Jaylyn Agnew
May 5, 2022	Waived Maya Caldwell
May 5, 2022	Temporarily Suspend Tiffany Hayes due to Overseas Commitments
May 6, 2022	Claimed Beatrice Mompremier of a waivers
May 13, 2022	Activated Tiffany Hayes from her Temporary Suspension
June 8, 2022	Traded Megan Walker and the rights to Raquel Carrera to the New York Liberty in exchange for AD
June 15, 2022	Signed Destiny Slocum to a Hardship Contract
June 20, 2022	Signed Maya Caldwell to a Hardship Contract
June 23, 2022	Released Destiny Slocum from her Hardship Contract
June 23, 2022	Signed Yvonne Turner to a Hardship Contract
June 27, 2022	Released Yvonne Turner and Maya Caldwell from their Hardship Contracts
August 2, 2022	Signed Maya Caldwell to a 7-Day Hardship Contract
August 9, 2022	Signed Maya Caldwell to a Hardship Contract
August 11, 2022	Signed Kaila Charles to a Hardship Contract
August 11, 2022	Temporarily Suspend Tiffany Hayes

== Roster ==
2022 Atlanta Dream roster
Players
Coaches

Pos.	No.	Nat.	Name	Height	Weight	DOB	From	Yrs
F	25	(United States)	Billings, Monique (injured)	6' 3" (1.91m)	192 lb (87kg)	1998-12-15	UCLA	R
G	33	(United States)	Caldwell, Maya	5' 11" (1.8m)	160 lb (73kg)	1998-12-15	Georgia	R
G	5	(United States)	Charles, Kaila	6' 1" (1.85m)	170 lb (77kg)	1998-03-23	Maryland	2
F	12	(United States)	Coffey, Nia (injured)	6' 1" (1.85m)	182 lb (83kg)	1995-06-11	Northwestern	5
G	23	(United States)	Durr, Asia (AD) (injured)	5' 10" (1.78m)	151 lb (68kg)	1997-04-05	Louisville	1
G	15	(United States)	Hayes, Tiffany (injured) (S)	5' 10" (1.78m)	155 lb (70kg)	1989-09-29	Connecticut	9
F	00	(United States)	Hillmon, Naz	6' 2" (1.88m)	190 lb (86kg)	2000-04-05	Michigan	R
F	10	(United States)	Howard, Rhyne	6' 2" (1.88m)	175 lb (79kg)	2000-04-29	Kentucky	R
G	2	(United States)	McDonald, Aari	5' 6" (1.68m)	141 lb (64kg)	1998-08-20	Arizona	1
F/C	1	(United States)	Mompremier, Beatrice	6' 4" (1.93m)	190 lb (86kg)	1996-08-08	Miami (FL)	2
C	32	(United States)	Parker, Cheyenne	6' 4" (1.93m)	193 lb (88kg)	1993-08-22	Middle Tennessee	7
C	7	(United States)	Vaughn, Kia	6' 4" (1.93m)	205 lb (93kg)	1987-01-24	Rutgers	12
G	3	(Australia)	Wallace, Kristy	5' 11" (1.8m)	157 lb (71kg)	1996-01-03	Baylor	R
G	17	(United States)	Wheeler, Erica	5' 7" (1.7m)	143 lb (65kg)	1991-05-02	Rutgers	6

Head coach
(United States) Tanisha Wright (Penn State)
Assistant coaches
(United States) Christie Sides (Louisiana Tech)
(Australia) Paul Goriss
(United States) Barbara Turner (Connecticut)
Athletic trainer
(United States) Natalie Trotter
Strength and conditioning coach
(United States) Drew Williams

Legend

- (C) Team captain
- (DP) Unsigned draft pick
- (FA) Free agent
- (S) Suspended
- Injured

=== Depth ===
Pos.	Starter	Bench
C	Cheyenne Parker	Kia Vaughn; Beatrice Mompremier
PF	Nia Coffey	Monique Billings; Naz Hillmon
SF	Rhyne Howard	Maya Caldwell
SG	Kristy Wallace	AD Durr; Tiffany Hayes
PG	Erica Wheeler	Aari McDonald

== Schedule ==
=== Preseason ===
2022 pre-season game log
Total: 1–1 (Home: 1–0; Road: 0–1)
April: 1–0 (Home: 1–0; Road: 0–0)

Game	Date	Team	Score	High points	High rebounds	High assists	Location Attendance	Record
1	April 24	Washington	W 88–69	Kristy Wallace (17)	Monique Billings (10)	Aari McDonald (6)	Gateway Center Arena; 854	1–0

May : 0–1 (Home: 0–0; Road: 0–1)

Game	Date	Team	Score	High points	High rebounds	High assists	Location Attendance	Record
2	May 1	@ Connecticut	L 78–94	Aari McDonald (12)	Billings/Hillmon (5)	Caldwell/Howard/Parker (3)	Mohegan Sun Arena; 3,244	1–1

2022 pre-season schedule

=== Regular season ===
2022 game log
Total: 14–22 (Home: 8–10; Road: 6–12)
May: 5–3 (Home: 2–2; Road: 3–1)

Game	Date	Team	Score	High points	High rebounds	High assists	Location Attendance	Record
1	May 7	@ Dallas	W 66–59	Rhyne Howard (16)	Monique Billings (14)	Rhyne Howard (4)	College Park Center; 5,796	1–0
2	May 11	Los Angeles	W 77–75	Rhyne Howard (21)	Billings; Coffey; Howard (8)	Erica Wheeler (5)	Gateway Center Arena; 3,138	2–0
3	May 13	Las Vegas	L 73–96	Aari McDonald (20)	Coffey; Wheeler (7)	Parker; Wallace; Wheeler (3)	Gateway Center Arena; 3,138	2–1
4	May 15	@ Indiana	W 85–79	Rhyne Howard (33)	Coffey; Parker (6)	Kristy Wallace (3)	Gainbridge Fieldhouse; 1,745	3–1
5	May 17	@ Indiana	W 101–79	Rhyne Howard (19)	Aari McDonald (6)	Parker; Wheeler (6)	Gainbridge Fieldhouse; 960	4–1
6	May 20	Washington	L 73–78	Rhyne Howard (21)	Nia Coffey (10)	Kristy Wallace (5)	Gateway Center Arena; N/A	4–2
7	May 24	@ Washington	L 50–70	Aari McDonald (10)	Parker; Wallace (7)	Erica Wheeler (4)	Entertainment and Sports Arena; 2,867	4–3
8	May 29	Phoenix	W 81–54	Kristy Wallace (17)	Cheyenne Parker (10)	Rhyne Howard (6)	Gateway Center Arena; 3,138	5–3

June : 4–8 (Home: 3–3; Road: 1–5)

Game	Date	Team	Score	High points	High rebounds	High assists	Location Attendance	Record
9	June 1	Minnesota	W 84–76	Rhyne Howard (22)	Monique Billings (9)	Erica Wheeler (9)	Gateway Center Arena; 1,268	6–3
10	June 3	Chicago	L 65–73	Cheyenne Parker (19)	Cheyenne Parker (6)	Erica Wheeler (5)	Gateway Center Arena; 3,138	6–4
11	June 5	Indiana	W 75–66	Coffey; Howard (16)	Nia Coffey (10)	Erica Wheeler (4)	Gateway Center Arena; 3,000	7–4
12	June 7	@ Seattle	L 60–72	Cheyenne Parker (13)	Cheyenne Parker (10)	Kristy Wallace (4)	Climate Pledge Arena; 7,262	7–5
13	June 10	@ Phoenix	L 88–90	Rhyne Howard (25)	Cheyenne Parker (13)	Rhyne Howard (5)	Footprint Center; 7,650	7–6
14	June 15	@ Connecticut	L 92–105	Asia Durr (21)	Naz Hillmon (9)	Aari McDonald (5)	Mohegan Sun Arena; 4,014	7–7
15	June 17	@ Chicago	L 100–106 (OT)	Asia Durr (21)	Hillmon; Parker (6)	Rhyne Howard (7)	Wintrust Arena; 7,435	7–8
16	June 21	Dallas	W 80–75	Maya Caldwell (18)	Rhyne Howard (8)	Aari McDonald (5)	Gateway Center Arena; N/A	8–8
17	June 24	New York	L 77–89	Asia Durr (23)	Rhyne Howard (8)	Aari McDonald (4)	Gateway Center Arena; 2,697	8–9
18	June 26	Connecticut	L 61–72	Aari McDonald (17)	Rhyne Howard (7)	Howard; McDonald (4)	Gateway Center Arena; 2,722	8–10
19	June 28	@ Washington	L 74–92	Asia Durr (13)	Mompremier; Parker (5)	Asia Durr (4)	Entertainment and Sports Arena; 3,517	8–11
20	June 30	@ New York	W 92–81 (OT)	Tiffany Hayes (21)	Hillmon; Parker (7)	Erica Wheeler (8)	Barclays Center; 6,161	9–11

July : 3–7 (Home: 1–4; Road: 2–3)

Game	Date	Team	Score	High points	High rebounds	High assists	Location Attendance	Record
21	July 3	Seattle	W 90–76	Cheyenne Parker (21)	Monique Billings (10)	Kristy Wallace (6)	Gateway Center Arena; 3,138	10–11
22	July 6	Washington	L 66–85	Billings; Hayes; R. Howard; Ch. Parker (10)	Monique Billings (9)	Monique Billings (4)	Gateway Center Arena; 1,810	10–12
23	July 12	@ Chicago	L 75–90	Cheyenne Parker (14)	Tiffany Hayes (8)	R. Howard; McDonald (3)	Wintrust Arena; 7,074	10–13
24	July 15	Connecticut	L 68–93	Tiffany Hayes (18)	Naz Hillmon (11)	Erica Wheeler (6)	Gateway Center Arena; 2,962	10–14
25	July 17	@ Phoenix	W 85–75	Cheyenne Parker (21)	Cheyenne Parker (12)	Erica Wheeler (7)	Footprint Center; 7,963	11–14
26	July 19	@ Las Vegas	W 92–76	Tiffany Hayes (31)	Naz Hillmon (10)	Cheyenne Parker (5)	Michelob Ultra Arena; 5,952	12–14
27	July 21	@ Los Angeles	L 78–85	Hayes; McDonald (18)	Rhyne Howard (9)	Ch. Parker; Wheeler (4)	Crypto.com Arena; 10,021	12–15
28	July 24	@ Seattle	L 72–82	Rhyne Howard (23)	Naz Hillmon (14)	Hillmon; Wheeler (4)	Climate Pledge Arena; 12,654	12–16
29	July 28	Minnesota	L 85–92	Tiffany Hayes (24)	Hillmon; Ch. Parker (6)	Aari McDonald (3)	Gateway Center Arena; 2,396	12–17
30	July 30	Dallas	L 68–81	Rhyne Howard (22)	Hillmon; R. Howard; Ch. Parker (6)	Erica Wheeler (6)	Gateway Center Arena; 3,138	12–18

August : 2–4 (Home: 2–1; Road: 0–3)

Game	Date	Team	Score	High points	High rebounds	High assists	Location Attendance	Record
31	August 3	Indiana	W 91–81	Rhyne Howard (20)	Maya Caldwell (7)	Caldwell; McDonald (6)	Gateway Center Arena; 2,071	13–18
32	August 5	Los Angeles	W 88–86	Rhyne Howard (28)	Naz Hillmon (9)	Erica Wheeler (4)	Gateway Center Arena; 3,138	14–18
33	August 7	@ Minnesota	L 71–81	R. Howard; McDonald (16)	Naz Hillmon (7)	Cheyenne Parker (5)	Target Center; 9,421	14–19
34	August 9	@ Las Vegas	L 90–97	Caldwell; Wheeler (17)	Naz Hillmon (8)	McDonald; Ch. Parker (5)	Michelob Ultra Arena; 5,151	14–20
35	August 12	New York	L 70–80	Erica Wheeler (16)	Monique Billings (9)	Erica Wheeler (3)	Gateway Center Arena; 3,138	14–21
36	August 14	@ New York	L 83–87	Rhyne Howard (24)	Naz Hillmon (7)	Rhyne Howard (7)	Barclays Center; 7,489	14–22

2022 season schedule

== Standings ==
#	Team	W	L	PCT	GB	Conf.	Home	Road	Cup
1	x – Las Vegas Aces	26	10	.722	–	15–3	13–5	13–5	9–1
2	x – Chicago Sky	26	10	.722	–	15–3	14–4	12–6	9–1
3	x – Connecticut Sun	25	11	.694	1.0	11–7	13–5	12–6	5–5
4	x – Seattle Storm	22	14	.611	4.0	10–8	13–5	9–9	6–4
5	x – Washington Mystics	22	14	.611	4.0	11–7	12–6	10–8	5–5
6	x – Dallas Wings	18	18	.500	8.0	8–10	8–10	10–8	5–5
7	x – New York Liberty	16	20	.444	10.0	10–8	9–9	7–11	6–4
8	x – Phoenix Mercury	15	21	.417	11.0	7–11	11–7	4–14	3–7
9	e – Minnesota Lynx	14	22	.389	12.0	8–10	7–11	7–11	4–6
10	e – Atlanta Dream	14	22	.389	12.0	5–13	8–10	6–12	3–7
11	e – Los Angeles Sparks	13	23	.361	13.0	6–12	7–11	6–12	3–7
12	e – Indiana Fever	5	31	.139	21.0	2–16	3–15	2–16	2–8

Notes

(#) – League Standing
x – Clinched playoff berth
e – Eliminated from playoff contention
Source: Overall standings and Commissioner's Cup Standings

== Statistics ==
Legend
GP	Games played	GS	Games started	MPG	Minutes per game	RPG	Rebounds per game
APG	Assists per game	SPG	Steals per game	BPG	Blocks per game	PPG	Points per game
FG%	Field-goal percentage	3P%	3-point field-goal percentage	FT%	Free-throw percentage	TO	Turnovers per game
PF	Fouls per game		Team leader		League leader

=== Regular season ===
Player	GP	GS	MPG	FG%	3P%	FT%	RPG	APG	SPG	BPG	PPG
Rhyne Howard	34	34	31.4	.361	.343	.792	4.5	2.8	1.6	0.8	16.2
Tiffany Hayes	11	11	27.5	.545	.429	.683	3.6	2.1	0.7	0.1	16.2
Cheyenne Parker	36	35	26.2	.500	.218	.795	6.2	2.0	1.1	0.9	11.8
Aari McDonald	36	6	24.3	.411	.338	.871	2.3	2.6	1.4	0.0	11.1
Maya Caldwell^{≠}	9	7	23.8	.514	.563	.800	2.4	2.2	0.8	0.2	10.9
AD Durr^{≠}	15	2	19.9	.422	.458	.774	1.9	1.7	0.3	0.1	10.7
Erica Wheeler	30	30	26.3	.355	.329	.756	3.1	3.9	1.1	0.1	8.4
Kristy Wallace	29	18	20.8	.407	.368	786	2.3	2.2	0.6	0.2	6.6
Monique Billings	23	8	17.4	.470	.000	.765	6.3	1.1	0.8	0.3	6.5
Nia Coffey	16	16	21.0	.347	.290	.742	5.2	0.8	0.6	0.1	6.4
Destiny Slocum^{‡}	3	0	13.7	.364	.333	.600	1.3	1.3	0.0	0.0	4.7
Naz Hillmon	34	12	19.8	.480	.000	.821	5.1	1.2	0.6	0.3	4.4
Megan Walker^{†}	12	0	9.6	.368	.368	.667	0.8	0.4	0.3	0.0	3.3
Kia Vaughn	29	1	13.8	.400	.000	.692	3.2	0.9	0.3	0.3	2.5
Beatrice Mompremier	21	0	8.3	.455	.000	.385	2.8	0.4	0.1	0.6	2.1
Yvonne Turner^{‡}	2	0	8.0	.000	.000	.500	1.0	0.5	0.5	0.0	0.5
Kaila Charles^{≠}	1	0	2.0	.000	.000	.000	0.0	0.0	0.0	0.0	0.0

^{‡}Waived/Released during the season
^{†}Traded during the season
^{≠}Acquired during the season

== Awards and honors ==
Recipient	Award	Date awarded	Ref.
Rhyne Howard	Eastern Conference Player of the Week	May 16	
Rhyne Howard	WNBA Rookie of the Month - May	June 1	
Rhyne Howard	WNBA All-Star Selection	June 28	
Rhyne Howard	WNBA Rookie of the Month - June	July 5	
Rhyne Howard	WNBA Rookie of the Month - July	August 2	
Rhyne Howard	WNBA Rookie of the Month - August	August 16	
Rhyne Howard	WNBA Rookie of the Year	August 25	
Rhyne Howard	WNBA All-Rookie Team	August 25	
