= 2022 Chicago Sky season =

- Head coach: James Wade
- Arena: Wintrust Arena

Results
- Record: 26–10 (.722)
- Place: 1st (Eastern)
- Playoff finish: 2nd seed; Lost in Semifinals to Connecticut Sun

The 2022 Chicago Sky season was the franchise's 17th season in the Women's National Basketball Association, and their fourth season under head coach James Wade. They were the defending league champions after defeating the Phoenix Mercury in the 2021 WNBA Finals.

Entering the offseason, the Sky only had four players from the previous season under contract. The team re-signed Courtney Vandersloot, Allie Quigley, and Kahleah Copper and added Emma Meesseman via free agency. Free agent Stefanie Dolson departed the team and signed with the New York Liberty. In a sign-and-trade deal, free agent Diamond DeShields was traded to the Phoenix Mercury and the Sky added Julie Allemand.

The defending champions lost the first game of the season, in overtime. However, they recovered and won their next two games. They finished the month winning three of five and with a 5–3 overall record. The Sky started June strongly, winning five of their first six, before losing to Indiana, on June 19. On June 21, the Sky broke the record for largest comeback win in WNBA history in a 104–95 win over the Las Vegas Aces after being down by 28 points. They used that momentum to win their next three games and finish the month with a 9–2 record. In July the team kept the hot streak going, winning six games in a row from July 7 to July 22. Four players were named to the All-Star Game: Candace Parker, Vandersloot, Copper, and Meesseman. They hosted the Commissioner's Cup, but lost to the Aces. The finished the month 9–2 and secured a playoff berth on July 20. After having secured the berth, their momentum slowed and they finished August with a 3–3 record. Their overall record of 26–10 was a franchise-best. They ended as the second seed in the playoffs.

As the second seed in the playoffs, they hosted a First Round series against the New York Liberty. They lost Game One of the series at home 91–98. They followed that up with a dominant 38 point win at home in Game Two. They Sky had to travel to New York for Game Three, and won by eighteen points to advance to the Semifinals. There, they faced off against the third seed Connecticut Sun. As the higher seed, they again had home court advantage in the series. As in the first round, they lost the first game at home. The Sky followed that up with a home win and a road win. They lost Game Four on the road by 24-points and could not finish the series at home in Game Five, losing 63–72 to end their season.

== Transactions ==
=== WNBA draft ===
The Sky do not have any picks in the 2022 WNBA Draft, having traded their second- and third-round picks to the Dallas Wings and their first-round pick to the Indiana Fever.

=== Trades and Roster Changes ===
Date	Transaction
January 2, 2022	Extended Qualifying Offers to Diamond DeShields and Lexie Brown
January 12, 2022	Extended a Core Qualifying Offer to Kahleah Copper
January 25, 2022	Hired Ann Wauters as assistant coach
February 3, 2022	Traded Diamond DeShields to Phoenix in exchange for Julie Allemand (from Indiana) and 2023 1st-round pick (from Phoenix)
February 5, 2022	Signed Crystal Bradford to a one-year deal
February 9, 2022	Signed Kysre Gondrezick and Kamiah Smalls to a training camp contracts
February 10, 2022	Signed Rebekah Gardner to a training camp contract
February 17, 2022	Re-signed Courtney Vandersloot and Allie Quigley to one-year deals
February 17, 2022	Re-signed Kahleah Copper
February 18, 2022	Signed Emma Meesseman
February 25, 2022	Signed Kathleen Doyle and Tina Krajišnik to training-camp contracts
March 9, 2022	Waived Crystal Bradford
March 11, 2022	Signed Anneli Maley to a training-camp contract
March 15, 2022	Signed Kaela Davis and Imani McGee-Stafford to training-camp contracts
March 30, 2022	Traded Lexie Brown to Los Angeles in exchange for the rights to Li Yueru
March 30, 2022	Signed Li Yueru to a rookie-scale contract
April 13, 2022	Signed Lexie Held and Kayla Wells to training-camp contracts
April 14, 2022	Signed Sparkle Taylor and Emmanuelle Tahane to training-camp contracts
April 15, 2022	Signed Masseny Kaba to a training-camp contract
April 16, 2022	Signed Lindsey Pulliam to a training-camp contract
April 28, 2022	Waived Kayla Well and Kamiah Smalls
April 29, 2022	Waived Imani McGee-Stafford and Lexi Held
May 2, 2022	Waived Lindsey Pulliam
May 4, 2022	Waived Kaela Davis, Kysre Gondrezick, Tina Krajišnik, Anneli Maley, and Sparkle Taylor
May 5, 2022	Waived Kathleen Doyle, Masseny Kaba, and Emmanuelle Tahane
May 5, 2022	Temporarily Suspend Julie Allemand, Rebekah Gardner, Kahleah Copper, and Li Yueru due to Overseas Commitments
May 6, 2022	Signed Sparkle Taylor, Anneli Maley, Tina Krajišnik, and Kaela Davis to Hardship Contracts
May 9, 2022	Released Kaela Davis and Anneli Maley from their Hardship Contracts
May 9, 2022	Activated Rebekah Gardner from her Temporary Suspension
May 10, 2022	Signed Anneli Maley to a Hardship Contract
May 13, 2022	Released Sparkle Taylor from the Hardship Contract
May 13, 2022	Exercised the 4th Year Team Option on Ruthy Hebard and Julie Allemand
May 20, 2022	Activated Kahleah Copper from her Temporary Suspension
May 20, 2022	Released Tina Krajišnik from her Hardship Contract
May 24, 2022	Activated Li Yueru from her Temporary Suspension
May 24, 2022	Released Anneli Maley from her Hardship Contract
August 24, 2022	Signed Head coach James Wade to a Contract Extension

== Roster ==
2022 Chicago Sky roster
Players
Coaches

Pos.	No.	Nat.	Name	Height	Weight	DOB	From	Yrs
G	20	(Belgium)	Allemand, Julie	5' 8" (1.73m)	147 lb (67kg)	1996-07-07	Belgium	1
G/F	2	(United States)	Copper, Kahleah	6' 1" (1.85m)	165 lb (75kg)	1994-08-28	Rutgers	6
G	11	(United States)	Evans, Dana	5' 6" (1.68m)	145 lb (66kg)	1998-08-01	Louisville	1
G	35	(United States)	Gardner, Rebekah	6' 1" (1.85m)	130 lb (59kg)	1990-07-09	UCLA	R
F	24	(United States)	Hebard, Ruthy	6' 4" (1.93m)	190 lb (86kg)	1998-04-28	Oregon	2
C	28	(China)	Li Yueru	6' 7" (2.01m)	200 lb (91kg)	1999-03-28	China	R
F	33	(Belgium)	Meesseman, Emma	6' 4" (1.93m)	191 lb (87kg)	1993-05-13	Belgium	7
F/C	3	(United States)	Parker, Candace	6' 4" (1.93m)	184 lb (83kg)	1986-04-19	Tennessee	14
G	14	(Hungary)	Quigley, Allie	5' 10" (1.78m)	142 lb (64kg)	1986-06-20	DePaul	13
F/C	30	(United States)	Stevens, Azurá	6' 6" (1.98m)	180 lb (82kg)	1996-02-01	Connecticut	4
G	22	(Hungary)	Vandersloot, Courtney	5' 8" (1.73m)	137 lb (62kg)	1989-02-08	Gonzaga	11

Head coach
(United States) James Wade (Kennesaw State)
Assistant coaches
(United States) Tonya Edwards (Tennessee)
(Belgium) Ann Wauters
(Turkey) Emre Vatansever
Athletic trainer
(United States) Meghan Lockerby
Strength and conditioning coach
(United States) Ann Crosby (Western Michigan)

Legend

- (C) Team captain
- (DP) Unsigned draft pick
- (FA) Free agent
- (S) Suspended
- Injured

=== Depth ===
Pos.	Starter	Bench
C	Candace Parker	Ruthy Hebard; Li Yueru
PF	Emma Meesseman	Azurá Stevens
SF	Kahleah Copper	Rebekah Gardner
SG	Allie Quigley	Dana Evans
PG	Courtney Vandersloot	Julie Allemand

== Schedule ==
=== Preseason ===
2022 pre-season game log
April: 0–2 (Home: 0–1; Road: 0–1)

Game	Date	Team	Score	High points	High rebounds	High assists	Location Attendance	Record
1	April 25	Dallas	L 77–92	Emma Meesseman (24)	Maley; Meesseman (5)	Dana Evans (7)	Wintrust Arena; N/A	0–1
2	April 30	@ Indiana	L 75–79	Emma Meesseman (13)	Emma Meesseman (8)	Evans/Taylor (3)	Gainbridge Fieldhouse; N/A	0–2

2022 pre-season schedule

=== Regular season ===
2022 game log
Total: 26–10 (Home: 14–4; Road: 12–6)
May: 5–3 (Home: 3–2; Road: 2–1)

Game	Date	Team	Score	High points	High rebounds	High assists	Location Attendance	Record
1	May 6	Los Angeles	L 91–98 OT	Dana Evans (24)	Emma Meesseman (8)	Courtney Vandersloot (8)	Wintrust Arena; 8,111	0–1
2	May 11	New York	W 83–50	Dana Evans (15)	Meesseman; Vandersloot (6)	Courtney Vandersloot (6)	Wintrust Arena; 4,935	1–1
3	May 14	@ Minnesota	W 82–78	Emma Meesseman (17)	Emma Meesseman (7)	Courtney Vandersloot (11)	Target Center; 6,503	2–1
4	May 18	@ Seattle	L 71–74	Azurá Stevens (18)	Candace Parker (9)	Courtney Vandersloot (12)	Climate Pledge Arena; 7,450	2–2
5	May 22	@ Washington	W 82–73	Candace Parker (16)	Candace Parker (13)	Candace Parker (10)	Entertainment and Sports Arena; 4,200	3–2
6	May 24	Indiana	W 95–90	Candace Parker (16)	Azurá Stevens (7)	Parker; Vandersloot (7)	Wintrust Arena; 7,741	4–2
7	May 28	Las Vegas	L 76–83	Copper; Vandersloot (12)	Candace Parker (11)	Parker; Vandersloot (3)	Wintrust Arena; 6,812	4–3
8	May 31	Phoenix	W 73–70	Courtney Vandersloot (18)	Candace Parker (11)	Courtney Vandersloot (6)	Wintrust Arena; 5,133	5–3

June : 9–2 (Home: 4–0; Road: 5–2)

Game	Date	Team	Score	High points	High rebounds	High assists	Location Attendance	Record
9	June 3	@ Atlanta	W 73–65	Kahleah Copper (21)	Kahleah Copper (8)	Courtney Vandersloot (6)	Gateway Center Arena; 3,138	6–3
10	June 5	Washington	W 91–82	Kahleah Copper (15)	Candace Parker (13)	Meesseman; Parker; Vandersloot (6)	Wintrust Arena; 6,228	7–3
11	June 8	@ Washington	L 82–84	Candace Parker (16)	Candace Parker (9)	Courtney Vandersloot (5)	Entertainment and Sports Arena; 2,984	7–4
12	June 10	@ Connecticut	W 83–79	Emma Meesseman (26)	Kahleah Copper; Gardner; Meesseman (5)	Courtney Vandersloot (8)	Mohegan Sun Arena; 4,816	8–4
13	June 12	@ New York	W 88–86	Meesseman; Vandersloot (20)	Emma Meesseman (11)	Courtney Vandersloot (10)	Barclays Center; 4,810	9–4
14	June 17	Atlanta	W 106–100 (OT)	Kahleah Copper (23)	Emma Meesseman (12)	Allemand; Gardner (5)	Wintrust Arena; 7,435	10–4
15	June 19	@ Indiana	L 87–89	Kahleah Copper (28)	Emma Meesseman (8)	Courtney Vandersloot (7)	Indiana Farmers Coliseum; 1,706	10–5
16	June 21	@ Las Vegas	W 104–95	Courtney Vandersloot (25)	Candace Parker (10)	Courtney Vandersloot (8)	Michelob Ultra Arena; 4,951	11–5
17	June 23	@ Los Angeles	W 82–59	Stevens; Vandersloot (15)	Candace Parker (14)	Candace Parker (10)	Crypto.com Arena; 5,627	12–5
18	June 26	Minnesota	W 88–85	Courtney Vandersloot (18)	Candace Parker (8)	Allie Quigley (8)	Wintrust Arena; 7,022	13–5
19	June 29	Connecticut	W 91–83	Candace Parker (25)	Candace Parker (11)	Candace Parker (7)	Wintrust Arena; 6,709	14–5

July : 9–2 (Home: 5–0; Road: 4–2)

Game	Date	Team	Score	High points	High rebounds	High assists	Location Attendance	Record
20	July 2	Phoenix	W 91–75	Allie Quigley (19)	Candace Parker (8)	Candace Parker (7)	Wintrust Arena; 8,028	15–5
21	July 6	@ Minnesota	L 78–81	Kahleah Copper (20)	Candace Parker (10)	Candace Parker (6)	Target Center; 11,103	15–6
22	July 7	@ Indiana	W 93–84	Emma Meesseman (20)	Candace Parker (9)	Courtney Vandersloot (6)	Indiana Farmers Coliseum; 1,839	16–6
23	July 12	Atlanta	W 90–75	Candace Parker (31)	Candace Parker (11)	Emma Meesseman (8)	Wintrust Arena; 7,074	17–6
24	July 14	@ Los Angeles	W 80–68	Rebekah Gardner (18)	Candace Parker (11)	Allemand; Gardner; Ca. Parker; Vandersloot (4)	Crypto.com Arena; 5,856	18–6
25	July 16	@ Dallas	W 89–81	Copper; Meesseman (23)	Kahleah Copper (14)	Julie Allemand (8)	College Park Center; 5,126	19–6
26	July 20	Seattle	W 78–74	Allie Quigley (18)	Emma Meesseman (10)	Emma Meesseman (6)	Wintrust Arena; 8,893	20–6
27	July 22	Dallas	W 89–83	Kahleah Copper (19)	Candace Parker (10)	Emma Meesseman (9)	Wintrust Arena; 7,014	21–6
28	July 23	@ New York	L 80–83	Candace Parker (21)	Candace Parker (11)	Gardner; Ca. Parker (3)	Barclays Center; 6,926	21–7
CC Final	July 26	Las Vegas	L 83–93	Candace Parker (20)	Candace Parker (14)	Julie Allemand (6)	Wintrust Arena; 8,922	N/A
29	July 29	New York	W 89–81	Courtney Vandersloot (23)	Kahleah Copper (11)	Courtney Vandersloot (9)	Wintrust Arena; 6,924	22–7
30	July 31	@ Connecticut	W 95–92 (OT)	Kahleah Copper (27)	Azurá Stevens (10)	Courtney Vandersloot (12)	Mohegan Sun Arena; 6,254	23–7

August : 3–3 (Home: 2–2; Road: 1–1)

Game	Date	Team	Score	High points	High rebounds	High assists	Location Attendance	Record
31	August 2	Dallas	L 78–84	Kahleah Copper (19)	Kahleah Copper (11)	Courtney Vandersloot (8)	Wintrust Arena; 5,602	23–8
32	August 5	Washington	W 93–83	Kahleah Copper (19)	Azurá Stevens (6)	Courtney Vandersloot (7)	Wintrust Arena; 8,042	24–8
33	August 7	Connecticut	W 94–91	Courtney Vandersloot (20)	Candace Parker (12)	Meesseman; Ca. Parker; Vandersloot (5)	Wintrust Arena; 8,224	25–8
34	August 9	Seattle	L 100–111	Courtney Vandersloot (28)	Candace Parker (7)	Courtney Vandersloot (7)	Wintrust Arena; 9,314	25–9
35	August 11	@ Las Vegas	L 78–89	Kahleah Copper (28)	Candace Parker (12)	Ca. Parker; Vandersloot (6)	Michelob Ultra Arena; 6,055	25–10
36	August 14	@ Phoenix	W 82–67	Azurá Stevens (17)	Candace Parker (6)	Julie Allemand (6)	Footprint Center; 12,383	26–10

2022 season schedule

=== Playoffs ===
2022 playoff game log
First Round vs. New York Liberty
Won Series: 2–1

Game	Date	Team	Score	High points	High rebounds	High assists	Location Attendance	Series
1	August 17	New York	L 91–98	Kahleah Copper (21)	Candace Parker (10)	Courtney Vandersloot (10)	Wintrust Arena; 7,524	0–1
2	August 20	New York	W 100–62	Kahleah Copper (20)	Candace Parker (12)	Allie Quigley (8)	Wintrust Arena; 7,732	1–1
3	August 23	@ New York	W 90–72	Copper; Quigley (15)	Candace Parker (13)	Courtney Vandersloot (10)	Barclays Center; 7,837	2–1

Semifinals vs. Connecticut Sun
Lost Series: 2–3

Game	Date	Team	Score	High points	High rebounds	High assists	Location Attendance	Series
1	August 28	Connecticut	L 63–68	Candace Parker (19)	Candace Parker (18)	Emma Meesseman (7)	Wintrust Arena; 8,955	0–1
2	August 31	Connecticut	W 85–77	Candace Parker (22)	Emma Meesseman (7)	Courtney Vandersloot (8)	Wintrust Arena; 8,311	1–1
3	September 4	@ Connecticut	W 76–72	Candace Parker (16)	Candace Parker (11)	Emma Meesseman (6)	Mohegan Sun Arena; 9,142	2–1
4	September 6	@ Connecticut	L 80–104	Kahleah Copper (16)	Candace Parker (9)	Emma Meesseman (6)	Mohegan Sun Arena; 5,868	2–2
5	September 8	Connecticut	L 63–72	Kahleah Copper (22)	Candace Parker (9)	Allie Quigley (7)	Wintrust Arena; 8,014	2–3

2022 playoff schedule

== Standings ==
#	Team	W	L	PCT	GB	Conf.	Home	Road	Cup
1	x – Las Vegas Aces	26	10	.722	–	15–3	13–5	13–5	9–1
2	x – Chicago Sky	26	10	.722	–	15–3	14–4	12–6	9–1
3	x – Connecticut Sun	25	11	.694	1.0	11–7	13–5	12–6	5–5
4	x – Seattle Storm	22	14	.611	4.0	10–8	13–5	9–9	6–4
5	x – Washington Mystics	22	14	.611	4.0	11–7	12–6	10–8	5–5
6	x – Dallas Wings	18	18	.500	8.0	8–10	8–10	10–8	5–5
7	x – New York Liberty	16	20	.444	10.0	10–8	9–9	7–11	6–4
8	x – Phoenix Mercury	15	21	.417	11.0	7–11	11–7	4–14	3–7
9	e – Minnesota Lynx	14	22	.389	12.0	8–10	7–11	7–11	4–6
10	e – Atlanta Dream	14	22	.389	12.0	5–13	8–10	6–12	3–7
11	e – Los Angeles Sparks	13	23	.361	13.0	6–12	7–11	6–12	3–7
12	e – Indiana Fever	5	31	.139	21.0	2–16	3–15	2–16	2–8

Notes

(#) – League Standing
x – Clinched playoff berth
e – Eliminated from playoff contention
Source: Overall standings and Commissioner's Cup Standings

== Playoffs ==
**First round** Best-of-3
**1**	**Las Vegas Aces**	**2**
8	Phoenix Mercury	0
**4**	**Seattle Storm**	**2**
5	Washington Mystics	0
**2**	**Chicago Sky**	**2**
7	New York Liberty	1
**3**	**Connecticut Sun**	**2**
6	Dallas Wings	1

**Semifinals**; Best-of-5
**1**	**Las Vegas Aces**	**3**
4	Seattle Storm	1
2	Chicago Sky	2
**3**	**Connecticut Sun**	**3**

**Finals**; Best-of-5
**1**	**Las Vegas Aces**	**3**
3	Connecticut Sun	1

- **Bold** – Series winner
- Italic – Team with home-court advantage

== Statistics ==
Legend
GP	Games played	GS	Games started	MPG	Minutes per game	RPG	Rebounds per game
APG	Assists per game	SPG	Steals per game	BPG	Blocks per game	PPG	Points per game
FG%	Field-goal percentage	3P%	3-point field-goal percentage	FT%	Free-throw percentage	TO	Turnovers per game
PF	Fouls per game		Team leader		League leader

=== Regular season ===
Player	GP	GS	MPG	FG%	3P%	FT%	RPG	APG	SPG	BPG	PPG
Kahleah Copper	31	31	28.7	.481	.356	.775	5.7	2.3	0.5	0.0	15.7
Candace Parker	32	32	28.3	.468	.311	.816	8.6	4.5	1.0	1.0	13.2
Emma Meesseman	36	36	28.6	.571	.342	.887	5.5	3.8	1.4	0.8	12.4
Courtney Vandersloot	32	32	26.5	.481	.367	.765	3.9	6.5	1.2	0.5	11.8
Allie Quigley	34	34	26.3	.428	.355	.950	2.5	2.9	0.7	0.2	11.4
Azurá Stevens	35	8	21.9	.472	.362	.744	3.9	0.8	0.5	1.1	10.6
Rebekah Gardner	35	2	21.7	.542	.357	.800	3.3	1.3	1.4	0.5	8.4
Sparkle Taylor^{‡}	2	0	12.5	.833	.000	1.000	1.0	0.0	0.0	0.0	5.5
Dana Evans	33	1	11.5	.377	.328	.880	0.8	1.2	0.3	0.1	4.3
Julie Allemand	25	4	16.1	.417	.290	.833	1.6	3.4	0.6	0.1	3.0
Ruthy Hebard	24	0	9.7	.510	.000	.750	1.7	0.5	0.3	0.1	2.3
Anneli Maley^{‡}	4	0	11.0	.500	.667	.000	1.8	0.8	0.8	0.3	2.0
Li Yueru^{≠}	16	0	5.1	.444	.000	1.000	1.5	0.1	0.1	0.1	1.8
Kaela Davis^{‡}	1	0	10.0	.000	.000	.000	1.0	0.0	0.0	0.0	0.0
Tina Krajišnik^{‡}	2	0	2.5	.000	.000	.000	0.0	1.0	0.5	0.0	0.0

^{‡}Waived/Released during the season
^{†}Traded during the season
^{≠}Acquired during the season

=== Playoffs ===
Player	GP	GS	MPG	FG%	3P%	FT%	RPG	APG	SPG	BPG	PPG
Kahleah Copper	8	8	30.5	.452	.346	.795	3.8	0.9	1.6	0.4	16.8
Candace Parker	8	8	29.4	.438	.333	.759	10.8	4.6	1.4	2.6	14.8
Courtney Vandersloot	8	8	28.3	.481	.261	.800	3.9	5.6	1.1	0.5	11.5
Emma Meesseman	8	8	29.6	.470	.300	.833	4.0	3.5	1.5	0.9	11.1
Allie Quigley	8	8	29.0	.338	.319	.714	3.1	3.1	1.0	0.3	9.6
Azurá Stevens	8	0	18.8	.472	.188	.667	3.8	0.5	1.0	0.9	7.4
Rebekah Gardner	8	0	17.9	.389	.000	.857	3.3	1.8	0.8	0.4	5.0
Dana Evans	4	0	5.8	.600	.600	1.000	0.8	0.5	0.5	0.0	4.3
Julie Allemand	8	0	11.5	.500	.300	.500	0.5	2.0	0.3	0.1	2.5
Ruthy Hebard	4	0	4.3	.200	.000	.000	1.3	0.3	0.5	0.0	0.5

== Awards and honors ==
Recipient	Award	Date awarded	Ref.
Kahleah Copper	Eastern Conference Player of the Week	June 21	
Kahleah Copper	WNBA All-Star Selection	June 28	
Candace Parker	WNBA All-Star Starter	June 22	
Candace Parker	All-WNBA First Team	September 15	
Courtney Vandersloot	Eastern Conference Player of the Week	June 27	
Courtney Vandersloot	Eastern Conference Player of the Week	August 1	
Courtney Vandersloot	WNBA All-Star Selection	June 28	
Emma Meesseman	WNBA All-Star Selection	June 28	
James Wade	WNBA Coach of the Month - June	July 5	
James Wade	WNBA Coach of the Month - July	August 2	
James Wade	WNBA Basketball Executive of the Year	August 22	
Rebekah Gardner	WNBA All-Rookie Team	August 25	
