= Nia Clouden =

American basketball player (born 2000)

Personal information
- Born: May 17, 2000 (age 26) Owings Mills, Maryland, U.S.
- Listed height: 5 ft 9 in (1.75 m)
- Listed weight: 139 lb (63 kg)

Career information
- High school: St. Frances (Baltimore, Maryland )
- College: Michigan State (2018–2022)
- WNBA draft: 2022: 1st round, 12th overall pick
- Drafted by: Connecticut Sun
- Playing career: 2022–present
- Position: Guard

Career history
- 2022: Connecticut Sun
- 2023: Los Angeles Sparks
- 2023: REG

Career highlights
- WBCA Honorable Mention All-American (2022); AP Honorable Mention All-American (2022); 2x First-team All-Big Ten (2021, 2022); All-Big Ten Second Team (2020); All-Big Ten Honorable Mention (2019); All-Big Ten Freshman Team (2019)
- Stats at Basketball Reference

Nia Clouden (born May 17, 2000) is an American professional basketball player who is a free agent. She played college basketball at Michigan State. Clouden was selected with the 12th overall pick in the 2022 WNBA draft.

== College career ==
Clouden came into her freshman year at Michigan State after being ranked the 42nd overall recruit in the 2018 ESPN HoopGurlz rankings.

Clouden's Spartan debut came in an exhibition game and she showed early how good she could become. She posted a near triple-double with 13 points, 9 assists and 7 rebounds against Hillsdale. Clouden started right away as a freshman and impressed head coach Suzy Merchant with her ability to run the team. Clouden continued to impress throughout her freshman year and was awarded being selected to the Big Ten All-Freshman team, as well as All-Big Ten Honorable Mention.

Clouden impressed in her second season in East Lansing as she was the leading scorer for the Spartans at 14.5 points per game. Clouden was named to the All-Tournament team when the Spartans went to the Junkanoo Jam tournament in November 2019. She scored a then career-high 28 points against Notre Dame in an early season win for the Spartans as well. She made 4 3-pointers, and added 3 steals and 3 rebounds Clouden was once again awarded from the Big Ten Conference for her year, this time earning All-Big Ten Second Team.

Clouden improved her scoring in her junior year once again. She was fifth overall in the entire conference averaging 18.7 points. She also became a top stealer - ranking 15th overall in the conference with 1.6 steals. In a rivalry game against in-state Michigan, Clouden set a new career high with 34 points. She again also improved in her honors from the Big Ten - this time moving up to All-Big Ten First Team.

In her senior season, Clouden put on one last show for the Spartans. She dropped a career high 50 points against Florida Gulf Coast. The 50 points broke the Michigan State women's basketball single game scoring record of 42 - previously held by Tori Jankoska. Clouden was award All-Big Ten First Team for a 2nd time in her career and added some All-American Honorable Mentions to her collection - from the AP and the WBCA.

== College statistics ==
Year	Team	GP	Points	FG%	3P%	FT%	RPG	APG	SPG	BPG	PPG
2018–19	Michigan State	33	397	.442	.368	.747	3.6	3.9	1.2	0.2	12.0
2019–20	Michigan State	30	436	.381	.274	.823	4.0	3.3	1.7	0.2	14.5
2020–21	Michigan State	24	448	.464	.324	.780	4.2	3.9	1.6	0.2	18.7
2021–22	Michigan State	30	601	.427	.396	.885	4.2	4.2	1.2	0.4	20.0
Career		117	1882	.427	.341	.813	4.0	3.8	1.4	0.2	16.1

== Professional career ==
=== Connecticut Sun ===
In the 2022 WNBA draft, Clouden was selected in the 1st Round - 12th overall - by the Connecticut Sun. Clouden made the opening day roster for 2022 - one of three new additions to the team from 2021.

=== Overseas ===
On November 25, 2023, Clouden signed a short-term contract with REG from Rwanda to play in the FIBA Africa Women's Basketball League (AWBL).

== WNBA career statistics ==
Legend
GP	Games played	GS	Games started	MPG	Minutes per game	RPG	Rebounds per game
APG	Assists per game	SPG	Steals per game	BPG	Blocks per game	PPG	Points per game
TO	Turnovers per game	FG%	Field-goal percentage	3P%	3-point field-goal percentage	FT%	Free-throw percentage
**Bold**	Career best	°	League leader

=== Regular season ===
Year	Team	GP	GS	MPG	FG%	3P%	FT%	RPG	APG	SPG	BPG	TO	PPG
2022	Connecticut	**28**	0	8.9	**.340**	**.414**	**.588**	**0.8**	0.8	**0.2**	0.0	**0.4**	**2.1**
2023	Los Angeles	5	**1**	**10.8**	.300	.333	.500	0.4	**1.8**	0.0	0.0	1.6	1.6
Career	2 years, 2 teams	33	1	9.2	.333	.406	.579	0.8	0.9	0.2	0.0	0.6	2.0

=== Playoffs ===
Year	Team	GP	GS	MPG	FG%	3P%	FT%	RPG	APG	SPG	BPG	TO	PPG
2022	Connecticut	7	0	4.6	.444	.500	1.000	0.3	0.7	0.3	0.0	0.1	1.9
Career	1 year, 1 team	7	0	4.6	.444	.500	1.000	0.3	0.7	0.3	0.0	0.1	1.9
