= 2022 Connecticut Sun season =

- Head coach: Curt Miller
- Arena: Mohegan Sun Arena

Results
- Record: 25–11 (.694)
- Place: 2nd (Eastern)
- Playoff finish: 3rd seed; Lost in WNBA Finals to Las Vegas Aces

The 2022 Connecticut Sun season was the 24th season for the Connecticut Sun franchise of the Women's National Basketball Association. It also was the 20th season for the franchise in Connecticut after relocating from Orlando. The season began on May 7, 2022, at the New York Liberty.

Despite losing their first game of the season, the Sun won their next four games in a row. They then went 2–2 to finish out the month of May with a 6–3 record. They started June with a four-game winning streak and won six of their first seven games. However, they lost three of their last four in the month to finish with a 7–4 record. In July, the Sun won 3 of its first five, but then went on a four-game winning streak. The streak Chicago on the final day of the month. They finished 7–3 in the month and secured a spot in the post season on July 28. The Sun went on a tear in August, only losing one game, to eventual #2 seed Chicago, and finished the month with a 5–1 record. Their overall regular season record of 25–11 was one shy of tying a franchise record for wins. They were the third seed in the playoffs, finishiLas Vegas and Chicago. Brionna Jones was named the Sixth Player of the Year.

As the third seed they hosted a first round matchup against the sixth seeded Dallas. The Sun won the first game in commanding fashion, 93–68. However, they lost Game Two by ten points, forcing a Game Three in Dallas. The Sun controlled the game and won by 15 points to advance to the Semifinals. There they faced off against the second seeded Chicago Sky. Connecticut won the first game by five points in Chicago. They went on to lose games two and three and faced elimination in Game Four. The Sun won game four by 24 points to force a Game Five in Chicago. The Sun won by nine points and advanced to the 2022 WNBA Finals. They faced off against the first seeded, Las Veagas Aces. Las Vegas one the first two games in Connecticut, Game One by three points, and Game Two by fourteen. The Sun won game three in Las Vegas by 29 points, but couldn't carry the momentum into Game Four losing by seven points. The Aces won the series 3–1.

== Transactions ==
=== WNBA draft ===
Round	Pick	Player	Nationality	School/team/country
1	12	Nia Clouden	United States	Michigan State
2	24	Jordan Lewis	United States	Baylor
3	36	Kiara Smith	United States	Florida

=== Trades and Roster Changes ===
Date	Details
January 1, 2022	Extended Qualifying Offers to Natisha Hiedeman, Stephanie Jones, and Beatrice Mompremier
January 3, 2022	Signed Natisha Hiedeman to a Qualifying Offer
January 4, 2022	Signed Beatrice Mompremier to a Qualifying Offer
January 10, 2022	Extended Jonquel Jones a Core Qualifying Offer
January 3, 2022	Signed Stephanie Jones to a Qualifying Offer
February 1, 2022	Signed Jonquel Jones to a Two-Year Deal
February 2, 2022	Signed Courtney Williams to a Two-Year Deal
February 2, 2022	Signed Taj Cole and Joyner Holmes to training-camp contracts
February 22, 2022	Signed Yvonne Anderson to a training-camp contract
April 12, 2022	Signed Alexus Dye, Delicia Washington and Aleksa Gulbe to training-camp contracts
April 14, 2022	Signed Nia Clouden and Jordan Lewis to rookie-scale contracts
April 20, 2022	Waived Alexus Dye, Delicia Washington, and Keyona Hayes
April 27, 2022	Waived Jordan Lewis
May 2, 2022	Waived Kaila Charles, Taj Cole, and Aleksa Gulbe
May 4, 2022	Waived Stephanie Jones and Beatrice Mompremier
May 5, 2022	Temporarily Suspend DeWanna Bonner due to Overseas Commitments
May 14, 2022	Activated DeWanna Bonner from the Temporary Suspension List
May 31, 2022	Signed Stephanie Jones to a Hardship Contract
June 4, 2022	Released Stephanie Jones from her Hardship Contract
June 11, 2022	Waived Yvonne Anderson
June 15, 2022	Signed Jazmine Jones
June 24, 2022	Waived Joyner Holmes and Jazmine Jones
June 26, 2022	Signed Joyner Holmes and Jazmine Jones to 7-day contracts
July 3, 2022	Signed Joyner Holmes and Jazmine Jones to their 2nd 7-day contracts
July 13, 2022	Signed Joyner Holmes and Jazmine Jones to their 3rd 7-day contracts
July 18, 2022	Signed Bria Hartley
July 21, 2022	Signed Joyner Holmes
July 27, 2022	Signed Kiana Williams to a 7-day contract
August 3, 2022	Signed Odyssey Sims to a 7-day contract
August 10, 2022	Signed Odyssey Sims to a Hardship Contract

== Roster ==
2022 Connecticut Sun roster
Players
Coaches

Pos.	No.	Nat.	Name	Height	Weight	DOB	From	Yrs
G/F	24	(North Macedonia)	Bonner, DeWanna	6' 4" (1.93m)	143 lb (65kg)	1987-08-21	Auburn	12
G/F	21	(United States)	Carrington, DiJonai	5' 11" (1.8m)	175 lb (79kg)	1998-01-08	Baylor	1
G	11	(United States)	Clouden, Nia	5' 9" (1.75m)	142 lb (64kg)	2000-05-17	Michigan State	R
G	14	(United States)	Hartley, Bria (injured)	5' 9" (1.75m)	148 lb (67kg)	1992-09-30	Connecticut	8
G	2	(United States)	Hiedeman, Natisha	5' 8" (1.73m)	135 lb (61kg)	1997-02-10	Marquette	3
F	8	(United States)	Holmes, Joyner	6' 3" (1.91m)	210 lb (95kg)	1998-02-22	Texas	2
F	42	(United States)	Jones, Brionna	6' 3" (1.91m)	230 lb (104kg)	1995-12-18	Maryland	5
F	35	(Bosnia and Herzegovina)	Jones, Jonquel	6' 6" (1.98m)	190 lb (86kg)	1994-01-05	George Washington	5
G	1	(United States)	Sims, Odyssey	5' 8" (1.73m)	155 lb (70kg)	1992-07-13	Baylor	8
F	25	(United States)	Thomas, Alyssa	6' 2" (1.88m)	185 lb (84kg)	1992-04-12	Maryland	8
G	5	(United States)	Thomas, Jasmine (injured)	5' 9" (1.75m)	143 lb (65kg)	1989-09-30	Duke	11
G	10	(United States)	Williams, Courtney	5' 8" (1.73m)	133 lb (60kg)	1994-05-11	South Florida	6

Head coach
(United States) Curt Miller (Baldwin Wallace)
Assistant coaches
(United States) Brandi Poole (Sewanee)
(United States) Chris Koclanes
Athletic trainer
(United States) Nicole Alexander
Strength and conditioning coach
(United States) Analisse Rios

Legend

- (C) Team captain
- (DP) Unsigned draft pick
- (FA) Free agent
- (S) Suspended
- Injured

=== Depth chart ===
Pos.	Starter	Bench
C	Jonquel Jones	Brionna Jones
PF	Alyssa Thomas	Joyner Holmes
SF	DeWanna Bonner	DiJonai Carrington
SG	Courtney Williams	Nia Clouden; Bria Hartley
PG	Natisha Hiedeman	Odyssey Sims; Jasmine Thomas

== Schedule ==
=== Preseason ===
2022 pre-season game log
May: 1–0 (Home: 1–0; Road: 0–0)

Game	Date	Team	Score	High points	High rebounds	High assists	Location Attendance	Record
1	May 1	Atlanta	W 94–78	Jonquel Jones (15)	Carrington; B. Jones (6)	Jasmine Thomas (5)	Mohegan Sun; 3,244	1–0

2022 pre-season schedule

=== Regular season ===
2022 game log
Total: 25–11 (Home: 13–5; Road: 12–6)
May: 6–3 (Home: 4–1; Road: 2–2)

Game	Date	Team	Score	High points	High rebounds	High assists	Location Attendance	Record
1	May 7	@ New York	L 79–81	Alyssa Thomas (25)	A. Thomas; J. Jones (7)	Natisha Hiedeman (6)	Barclays Center; 6,829	0–1
2	May 14	Los Angeles	W 77–60	Alyssa Thomas (23)	Jonquel Jones (12)	Alyssa Thomas (5)	Mohegan Sun Arena; 5,624	1–1
3	May 17	@ New York	W 92–65	DeWanna Bonner (16)	J. Jones; A. Thomas (6)	Bonner; Hiedeman; A. Thomas; J. Thomas (3)	Barclays Center; 3,054	2–1
4	May 20	Indiana	W 94–85	Jonquel Jones (19)	Jonquel Jones (8)	Bonner; Hiedeman (4)	Mohegan Sun Arena; 4,428	3–1
5	May 22	@ Indiana	W 92–70	B. Jones; A. Thomas (18)	Jonquel Jones (9)	Alyssa Thomas (6)	Gainbridge Fieldhouse; 2,612	4–1
6	May 24	Dallas	L 77–85	B. Jones; J. Jones; A. Thomas (13)	Jonquel Jones (12)	Alyssa Thomas (9)	Mohegan Sun Arena; 4,180	4–2
7	May 26	Dallas	W 99–68	DeWanna Bonner (18)	Brionna Jones (7)	Natisha Hiedeman (6)	Mohegan Sun Arena; 4,308	5–2
8	May 28	Washington	W 79–71	Bonner; A. Thomas; Williams (14)	Alyssa Thomas (10)	Courtney Williams (7)	Mohegan Sun Arena; 5,482	6–2
9	May 31	@ Las Vegas	L 81–89	DeWanna Bonner (14)	Jonquel Jones (13)	Alyssa Thomas (6)	Michelob Ultra Arena; 4,693	6–3

June : 7–4 (Home: 3–2; Road: 4–2)

Game	Date	Team	Score	High points	High rebounds	High assists	Location Attendance	Record
10	June 2	@ Las Vegas	W 97–90	Jonquel Jones (20)	Alyssa Thomas (12)	Williams; Hiedeman (6)	Michelob Ultra Arena; 3,801	7–3
11	June 3	@ Phoenix	W 92–88	Jonquel Jones (24)	Alyssa Thomas (10)	Alyssa Thomas (7)	Footprint Center; 7,180	8–3
12	June 5	@ Seattle	W 93–86	Jonquel Jones (25)	Alyssa Thomas (11)	Alyssa Thomas (12)	Climate Pledge Arena; 11,330	9–3
13	June 8	Indiana	W 88–69	Brionna Jones (18)	B. Jones; J. Jones; A. Thomas (9)	Alyssa Thomas (5)	Mohegan Sun Arena; 4,088	10–3
14	June 10	Chicago	L 79–83	Brionna Jones (20)	Jonquel Jones (14)	Alyssa Thomas (8)	Mohegan Sun Arena; 4,816	10–4
15	June 15	Atlanta	W 105–92	Courtney Williams (20)	Jonquel Jones (9)	Alyssa Thomas (6)	Mohegan Sun Arena; 4,014	11–4
16	June 17	Seattle	W 82–71	DeWanna Bonner (20)	Jonquel Jones (13)	Alyssa Thomas (8)	Mohegan Sun Arena; 7,088	12–4
17	June 19	@ Washington	L 63–71	Jonquel Jones (15)	Jonquel Jones (16)	Alyssa Thomas (3)	Entertainment and Sports Arena; 3,959	12–5
18	June 22	New York	L 77–81	Courtney Williams (16)	Jonquel Jones (11)	Alyssa Thomas (5)	Mohegan Sun Arena; 4,652	12–6
19	June 26	@ Atlanta	W 72–61	Courtney Williams (17)	Alyssa Thomas (11)	Alyssa Thomas (8)	Gateway Center Arena; 2,722	13–6
20	June 29	@ Chicago	L 83–91	Jonquel Jones (24)	Jonquel Jones (11)	Natisha Hiedeman (7)	Wintrust Arena; 6,709	13–7

July : 7–3 (Home: 3–2; Road: 4–1)

Game	Date	Team	Score	High points	High rebounds	High assists	Location Attendance	Record
21	July 3	Washington	W 74–72 (OT)	Alyssa Thomas (23)	Alyssa Thomas (9)	Natisha Hiedeman (5)	Mohegan Sun Arena; 5,814	14–7
22	July 5	@ Dallas	L 71–82	Courtney Williams (25)	Jonquel Jones (7)	Alyssa Thomas (6)	College Park Center; 3,445	14–8
23	July 13	@ Indiana	W 89–81	Jonquel Jones (20)	Jonquel Jones (14)	Alyssa Thomas (7)	Indiana Farmers Coliseum; 3,212	15–8
24	July 15	@ Atlanta	W 93–68	Jonquel Jones (21)	B. Jones; J. Jones; A. Thomas (6)	Alyssa Thomas (5)	Gateway Center Arena; 2,962	16–8
25	July 17	Las Vegas	L 83–91	DeWanna Bonner (19)	Alyssa Thomas (14)	Alyssa Thomas (6)	Mohegan Sun Arena; 6,814	16–9
26	July 19	New York	W 82–63	Brionna Jones (21)	Alyssa Thomas (13)	Courtney Williams (6)	Mohegan Sun Arena; 6,288	17–9
27	July 22	@ Minnesota	W 94–84	DeWanna Bonner (20)	Alyssa Thomas (10)	Alyssa Thomas (12)	Target Center; 8,321	18–9
28	July 24	@ Minnesota	W 86–79	Natisha Hiedeman (19)	Alyssa Thomas (10)	DeWanna Bonner (8)	Target Center; 7,231	19–9
29	July 28	Seattle	W 88–83	Alyssa Thomas (19)	DeWanna Bonner (10)	Alyssa Thomas (11)	Mohegan Sun Arena; 9,137	20–9
30	July 31	Chicago	L 92–95 (OT)	DeWanna Bonner (23)	Bonner; B. Jones (9)	Alyssa Thomas (8)	Mohegan Sun Arena; 6,254	20–10

August : 5–1 (Home: 3–0; Road: 2–1)

Game	Date	Team	Score	High points	High rebounds	High assists	Location Attendance	Record
31	August 2	Phoenix	W 87–63	Natisha Hiedeman (16)	Alyssa Thomas (12)	Alyssa Thomas (10)	Mohegan Sun Arena; 6,130	21–10
32	August 4	Phoenix	W 77–64	Jonquel Jones (14)	Alyssa Thomas (13)	Alyssa Thomas (6)	Mohegan Sun Arena; 6,215	22–10
33	August 7	@ Chicago	L 91–94	DeWanna Bonner (18)	Jonquel Jones (10)	DeWanna Bonner (6)	Wintrust Arena; 8,224	22–11
34	August 9	@ Los Angeles	W 97–71	Jonquel Jones (21)	Jonquel Jones (10)	Alyssa Thomas (7)	Crypto.com Arena; 5,789	23–11
35	August 11	@ Los Angeles	W 93–69	Alyssa Thomas (18)	Alyssa Thomas (9)	DeWanna Bonner (7)	Crypto.com Arena; 4,987	24–11
36	August 14	Minnesota	W 90–83	Alyssa Thomas (16)	Alyssa Thomas (7)	Hiedeman; A. Thomas (5)	Mohegan Sun Arena; 7,489	25–11

2022 season schedule

=== Playoffs ===
2022 playoff game log
First Round vs. Dallas Wings
Won Series: 2–1

Game	Date	Team	Score	High points	High rebounds	High assists	Location Attendance	Series
1	August 18	Dallas	W 93–68	Jonquel Jones (19)	Alyssa Thomas (10)	Alyssa Thomas (7)	Mohegan Sun Arena; 4,797	1–0
2	August 24	Dallas	L 79–89	B. Jones; J. Jones (20)	Jonquel Jones (9)	Alyssa Thomas (5)	Mohegan Sun Arena; 6,788	1–1
3	August 24	@ Dallas	W 73–58	DeWanna Bonner (21)	Jonquel Jones (10)	DeWanna Bonner (5)	College Park Center; 5,016	2–1

Semifinals vs. Chicago Sky
Won Series: 3–2

Game	Date	Team	Score	High points	High rebounds	High assists	Location Attendance	Series
1	August 28	@ Chicago	W 68–63	DeWanna Bonner (15)	Alyssa Thomas (10)	Alyssa Thomas (7)	Wintrust Arena; 8,955	1–0
2	August 31	@ Chicago	L 77–85	Jonquel Jones (23)	Alyssa Thomas (10)	Alyssa Thomas (4)	Wintrust Arena; 8,311	1–1
3	September 4	Chicago	L 72–76	DeWanna Bonner (18)	Alyssa Thomas (13)	Alyssa Thomas (7)	Mohegan Sun Arena; 9,142	1–2
4	September 6	Chicago	W 104–80	Bonner; Williams (19)	Alyssa Thomas (8)	Jonquel Jones (5)	Mohegan Sun Arena; 5,868	2–2
5	September 8	@ Chicago	W 72–63	Bonner; J. Jones (15)	Thomas; J. Jones (10)	Alyssa Thomas (8)	Wintrust Arena; 8,014	3–2

Finals vs. Las Vegas Aces
Lost Series: 1–3

Game	Date	Team	Score	High points	High rebounds	High assists	Location Attendance	Series
1	September 11	@ Las Vegas	L 64–67	Alyssa Thomas (19)	Alyssa Thomas (11)	Bonner; A. Thomas (5)	Michelob Ultra Arena; 10,135	0–1
2	September 13	@ Las Vegas	L 71–85	Courtney Williams (18)	Jonquel Jones (11)	Courtney Williams (5)	Michelob Ultra Arena; 10,211	0–2
3	September 15	Las Vegas	W 105–76	Jonquel Jones (20)	Alyssa Thomas (15)	Alyssa Thomas (11)	Mohegan Sun Arena; 8,745	1–2
4	September 18	Las Vegas	L 71–78	Courtney Williams (17)	Alyssa Thomas (10)	Alyssa Thomas (11)	Mohegan Sun Arena; 9,652	1–3

2022 playoff schedule

== Standings ==
#	Team	W	L	PCT	GB	Conf.	Home	Road	Cup
1	x – Las Vegas Aces	26	10	.722	–	15–3	13–5	13–5	9–1
2	x – Chicago Sky	26	10	.722	–	15–3	14–4	12–6	9–1
3	x – Connecticut Sun	25	11	.694	1.0	11–7	13–5	12–6	5–5
4	x – Seattle Storm	22	14	.611	4.0	10–8	13–5	9–9	6–4
5	x – Washington Mystics	22	14	.611	4.0	11–7	12–6	10–8	5–5
6	x – Dallas Wings	18	18	.500	8.0	8–10	8–10	10–8	5–5
7	x – New York Liberty	16	20	.444	10.0	10–8	9–9	7–11	6–4
8	x – Phoenix Mercury	15	21	.417	11.0	7–11	11–7	4–14	3–7
9	e – Minnesota Lynx	14	22	.389	12.0	8–10	7–11	7–11	4–6
10	e – Atlanta Dream	14	22	.389	12.0	5–13	8–10	6–12	3–7
11	e – Los Angeles Sparks	13	23	.361	13.0	6–12	7–11	6–12	3–7
12	e – Indiana Fever	5	31	.139	21.0	2–16	3–15	2–16	2–8

Notes

(#) – League Standing
x – Clinched playoff berth
e – Eliminated from playoff contention
Source: Overall standings and Commissioner's Cup Standings

== Playoffs ==
**First round** Best-of-3
**1**	**Las Vegas Aces**	**2**
8	Phoenix Mercury	0
**4**	**Seattle Storm**	**2**
5	Washington Mystics	0
**2**	**Chicago Sky**	**2**
7	New York Liberty	1
**3**	**Connecticut Sun**	**2**
6	Dallas Wings	1

**Semifinals**; Best-of-5
**1**	**Las Vegas Aces**	**3**
4	Seattle Storm	1
2	Chicago Sky	2
**3**	**Connecticut Sun**	**3**

**Finals**; Best-of-5
**1**	**Las Vegas Aces**	**3**
3	Connecticut Sun	1

- **Bold** – Series winner
- Italic – Team with home-court advantage

== Statistics ==
Legend
GP	Games played	GS	Games started	MPG	Minutes per game	RPG	Rebounds per game
APG	Assists per game	SPG	Steals per game	BPG	Blocks per game	PPG	Points per game
FG%	Field-goal percentage	3P%	3-point field-goal percentage	FT%	Free-throw percentage	TO	Turnovers per game
PF	Fouls per game		Team leader		League leader

=== Regular season ===
Player	GP	GS	MPG	FG%	3P%	FT%	RPG	APG	SPG	BPG	PPG
Jonquel Jones	33	32	26.4	.513	.369	.802	8.6	1.8	1.1	1.2	14.6
Brionna Jones	36	7	25.1	.571	.000	.844	5.1	1.3	1.2	0.4	13.8
DeWanna Bonner	33	33	30.0	.439	.329	.827	4.7	2.8	1.2	0.3	13.5
Alyssa Thomas	36	36	32.1	.500	.000	.730	8.2	6.1	1.7	0.2	13.4
Courtney Williams	34	34	27.9	.426	.338	.750	4.6	3.3	1.0	0.4	11.1
Natisha Hiedeman	36	31	25.0	.431	.411	.800	1.8	3.3	1.2	0.1	9.1
DiJonai Carrington	36	2	17.5	.414	.306	.750	3.1	1.1	0.8	0.1	6.8
Jasmine Thomas	5	5	21.8	.267	.385	.923	2.2	3.0	0.6	0.2	6.6
Odyssey Sims^{≠}	5	0	18.2	.333	.273	1.000	1.2	2.6	1.4	0.0	5.8
Bria Hartley^{≠}	3	0	12.0	.455	.500	.000	0.7	1.3	1.0	0.0	4.7
Yvonne Anderson^{‡}	11	0	9.2	.462	.400	1.000	0.8	1.1	0.3	0.2	3.2
Nia Clouden	28	0	8.9	.340	.414	.588	0.8	0.8	0.2	0.0	2.1
Joyner Holmes	26	0	7.9	.311	.227	.769	1.3	0.5	0.3	0.1	2.0
Stephanie Jones^{‡}	2	0	4.0	.000	.000	1.000	0.0	0.5	0.0	0.0	1.0
Jazmine Jones^{‡}	7	0	6.3	.286	.000	.400	0.1	0.1	0.3	0.0	0.9
Kiana Williams^{‡}	1	0	3.0	.000	.000	.000	0.0	0.0	0.0	0.0	0.0

^{‡}Waived/Released during the season
^{†}Traded during the season
^{≠}Acquired during the season

=== Playoffs ===
Player	GP	GS	MPG	FG%	3P%	FT%	RPG	APG	SPG	BPG	PPG
Jonquel Jones	12	12	27.0	.507	.414	.829	8.4	2.0	0.6	1.1	14.9
Alyssa Thomas	12	12	33.5	.474	.000	.576	9.5	6.3	1.5	0.7	12.3
DeWanna Bonner	12	12	31.5	.341	.294	.886	5.8	3.6	1.5	0.7	12.2
Courtney Williams	12	12	27.1	.415	.318	.667	3.9	2.3	0.6	0.5	10.3
Brionna Jones	12	0	21.3	.522	.000	.711	4.0	1.3	0.9	0.3	10.6
Natisha Hiedeman	12	12	26.2	.419	.444	.769	2.1	3.0	0.7	0.3	8.2
DiJonai Carrington	12	0	14.6	.450	.231	.700	2.7	0.8	1.0	0.2	5.9
Odyssey Sims	12	0	13.8	.436	.286	.875	1.5	1.3	0.4	0.0	3.6
Nia Clouden	7	0	4.6	.444	.500	1.000	0.3	0.7	0.3	0.0	1.9
Joyner Holmes	7	0	4.1	.500	.000	1.000	1.3	0.7	0.1	0.0	4.1

== Awards and honors ==
Recipient	Award	Date awarded	Ref.
Alyssa Thomas	Eastern Conference Player of the Week	May 23	
Alyssa Thomas	Eastern Conference Player of the Week	July 25	
Alyssa Thomas	Eastern Conference Player of the Month - May	June 1	
Alyssa Thomas	Eastern Conference Player of the Month - July	August 2	
Alyssa Thomas	WNBA All-Star Selection	June 28	
Alyssa Thomas	All-Defensive Second Team	August 30	
Alyssa Thomas	All-WNBA Second Team	September 15	
Jonquel Jones	Eastern Conference Player of the Week	June 6	
Jonquel Jones	WNBA All-Star Starter	June 22	
Jonquel Jones	All-Defensive Second Team	August 30	
Jonquel Jones	All-WNBA Second Team	September 15	
Brionna Jones	WNBA All-Star Selection	June 28	
Brionna Jones	Sixth Player of the Year	September 1	
