= Katie Benzan =

American basketball player (born 1998)

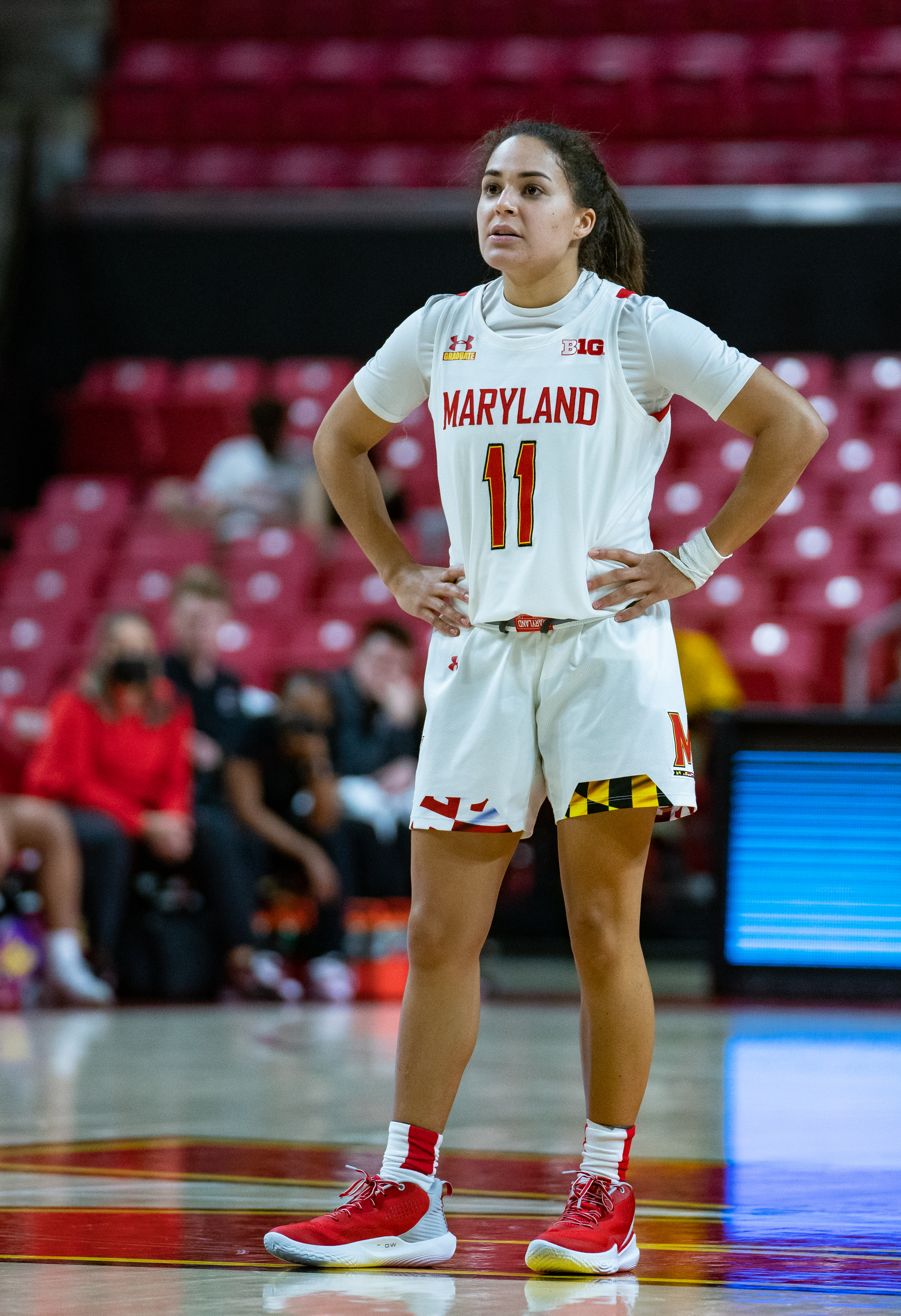

Salt Lake City Stars
- Position: Executive
- League: NBA G League

Personal information
- Born: May 16, 1998 (age 28) Wellesley, Massachusetts
- Listed height: 5 ft 6 in (1.68 m)

Career information
- High school: Noble and Greenough School (Dedham, Massachusetts)
- College: Harvard (2016-2020); Maryland (2020–2022)
- WNBA draft: 2022: undrafted
- Playing career: 2022–present

Career history
- 2022: Washington Mystics

Career highlights
- 2x AP Honorable Mention All-American (2021, 2022); All-Big Ten 2nd Team (2021, 2022); Big Ten Sportsmanship Award (2022); 3x All-Ivy League 1st Team (2017–2019)
- Stats at Basketball Reference

Katie Benzan (born May 16, 1998) is an American of Dominican descent former professional basketball player who most recently served as the general manager for the Salt Lake City Stars of the NBA G League. She played in the Women's National Basketball Association (WNBA) for the Washington Mystics in 2022. She played college basketball at Maryland and Harvard.

== College career ==
=== Harvard ===
During, Benzan's time at Harvard, she proved to be one of the best in the Ivy League right from the start. She was named to the All-Ivy League First Team all three years that she was a Crimson. She was voted onto the First Team unanimously during her 2nd year. In her junior season, she scored her career high in points against Quinnipiac with 27. Prior to her last season at Harvard, Benzan had decided to forgo her senior year and sit out and she left the Harvard team.

On October 28, 2019, Benzan decided that she would use her graduate season at the University of Texas. By the spring of 2020, Benzan decided to change her decision and shifted her next school to being Maryland.

=== Maryland ===
During her first season at Maryland, Benzan led the entire nation in 3-point field-goal percentage at 50%. She averaged 12.7 points, and broke the Maryland program record for 3-pointers made in a single game against Iowa. At the end of her first season with the Terrapins, Benzan was named to All-Big Ten Second Team and was named an AP Honorable Mention All-American.

Benzan decided to return to College Park for her COVID-Extra year. She continued to be a 3-point specialist, as she broke the Maryland career three-point percentage record with a 47.4%. While the Terrapins struggled on the court for their standards, Benzan was once against named to the All-Big Ten Second Team from the media, while the coaches awarded her an Honorable Mention.

== College statistics ==
Year	Team	GP	Points	FG%	3P%	FT%	RPG	APG	SPG	BPG	PPG
2016–17	Harvard	30	403	.399	.394	.941	3.3	4.2	1.1	0.2	13.4
2017–18	Harvard	29	391	.431	.450	.830	3.2	3.8	1.5	0.1	13.5
2018–19	Harvard	30	429	.387	.356	.857	3.2	4.2	1.6	0.2	14.3
2020–21	Maryland	29	367	.492	.500*	.938	2.6	3.3	1.6	0.1	12.7
2021–22	Maryland	29	296	.441	.445	.958	2.8	3.8	1.7	0.1	10.2
Career		147	1886	.424	.421	.900	3.0	3.9	1.5	0.1	12.8

== Professional career ==
=== Washington Mystics ===
Benzan went undrafted in the 2022 WNBA draft, but signed a training camp contract with the Washington Mystics. Benzan made the Opening Day roster, but was cut on May 6, 2022, when the team signed Kennedy Burke. She signed a hardship contract with the Mystics on May 8. Benzan made WNBA history when she checked into her first ever game on May 8, as she became the first Dominican player to play in the league. Benzan was released from her hardship contract with the Mystics on May 16.

== Executive career ==
On June 10, 2025, the Utah Jazz announced that Benzan would be promoted to serve as the general manager for the Salt Lake City Stars of the NBA G League. On May 24, 2026, it was announced that Shane Fenske would take over as the Stars' general manager, with Benzan remaining with the team in a different capacity.

== Career statistics ==
=== Regular season ===
Year	Team	GP	GS	MPG	FG%	3P%	FT%	RPG	APG	SPG	BPG	TO	PPG
2022	Washington	3	0	9.0	.556	.714	.750	0.7	0.3	0.0	0.3	0.7	6.0
Career	1 year, 1 team	3	0	9.0	.556	.714	.750	0.7	0.3	0.0	0.3	0.7	6.0
