= 2022 Washington Mystics season =

- Head coach: Mike Thibault
- Arena: Entertainment and Sports Arena

Results
- Record: 22–14 (.611)
- Place: 3rd (Eastern)
- Playoff finish: 5th seed; Lost in 1st Round to the Seattle Storm

The 2022 Washington Mystics season is the franchise's 25th season in the Women's National Basketball Association. The regular season will tip off versus the Indiana Fever on May 6, 2022.

The Mystics won the Draft Lottery and received the 1st Overall pick in the 2022 WNBA draft, despite only having the third best odds to win. This is the first time in franchise history that the Mystics had the #1 Overall pick. The team traded the pick to Atlanta and moved down to the third overall pick in the Draft.

The Mystics started the season on a three-game winning streak, before losing their first game. The continued on to win four of their next six games and finished the month of May 7–3. Their fortunes turned a little in June, with the team not being able to put together a streak of wins and they finished the month 6–6. The team improved in July, finishing 6–3 and winning five of six in the middle of the month. The Mystics finished August 3–2, losing two games in the middle but winning the final two games. Their overall record of 22–14 left them tied for fourth place with Seattle.

Seattle won the tiebreaker for the playoffs, by finishing the regular season 2–1 against the Mystics. The two teams would meet in the first round of the 2022 WNBA Playoffs, with Seattle being the fourth seed and Washington being the fifth seed. The first two games of the series were in Seattle and those were the only two games that were needed out of the possible three-game series. The Mystics lost the first game by three points and the second by thirteen to drop the series 0–2 and end their season.

== Transactions ==
=== WNBA draft ===
Round	Pick	Player	Nationality	School/team/country
1	3	Shakira Austin	United States	Ole Miss
2	14	Christyn Williams	United States	UConn

=== Trades and Roster Changes ===
Date	Transaction
January 5, 2022	Extended Qualifying Offers to Myisha Hines-Allen and Megan Gustafson
January 6, 2022	Signed Megan Gustafson to a Qualifying Offer
January 27, 2022	Hired Shelley Patterson as an assistant coach
February 1, 2022	Re-Signed Myisha Hines-Allen to a Multi-Year Deal
February 1, 2022	Signed Elizabeth Williams to a One-Year Deal
February 1, 2022	Signed Klara Lundquist, Lee-Seul Kang, Tianna Hawkins, and Shatori Walker-Kimbrough to training-camp contracts
February 14, 2022	Signed Rui Machida to a training-camp contract
February 17, 2022	Signed MeMe Jackson to a training-camp contract
February 18, 2022	Suspended Klara Lundquist's contract for the Full Season - Personal Decision
February 22, 2022	Signed Linnae Harper to a training-camp contract
February 24, 2022	Signed Stephanie Mavunga to a training-camp contract
February 28, 2022	Waived Sydney Wiese
April 6, 2022	Traded the #1 Pick in the 2022 WNBA Draft to the Atlanta Dream in exchange for the #3 and #14 picks in the 2022 WNBA Draft, and the right to exchange 1st Round Picks in 2023 with the Los Angeles Sparks that the Dream received in an earlier trade
April 14, 2022	Signed Shakira Austin to a rookie-scale contract
April 14, 2022	Signed Jennifer Coleman to a training-camp contract
April 15, 2022	Signed Christyn Williams to rookie-scale contract
April 18, 2022	Waived Jennifer Coleman
April 20, 2022	Signed Katie Benzan to a training-camp contract
April 22, 2022	Waived Christyn Williams
April 25, 2022	Waived MeMe Jackson
April 28, 2022	Waived Erica McCall, Megan Gustafson, and Lee-Seul Kang
May 3, 2022	Waived Stephanie Mavunga and Linnae Harper
May 5, 2022	Temporarily Suspend Elizabeth Williams due to Overseas Commitments
May 6, 2022	Waived Katie Benzan
May 6, 2022	Claimed Kennedy Burke off of waivers and then temporarily suspended her due to Overseas commitments
May 6, 2022	Signed Stephanie Jones to a Hardship Contract
May 8, 2022	Signed Katie Benzan to a Hardship Contract
May 13, 2022	Released Stephanie Jones from her Hardship Contract
May 16, 2022	Released Katie Benzan from her Hardship Contract
May 16, 2022	Activated Kennedy Burke from her Temporary Suspension
May 19, 2022	Activated Elizabeth Williams from her Temporary Suspension
June 24, 2022	Waived Kennedy Burke
June 27, 2022	Signed Evina Westbrook to a 7-day contract
July 4, 2022	Signed Evina Westbrook to a 2nd 7-day contract
July 11, 2022	Signed Evina Westbrook to a 3rd 7-day contract
July 18, 2022	Signed Evina Westbrook
August 10, 2022	Signed Jazmine Jones

== Roster ==
2022 Washington Mystics roster
Players
Coaches

Pos.	No.	Nat.	Name	Height	Weight	DOB	From	Yrs
G	7	(United States)	Atkins, Ariel	5' 8" (1.73m)	167 lb (76kg)	1996-07-30	Texas	4
C	0	(United States)	Austin, Shakira	6' 5" (1.96m)	190 lb (86kg)	2000-07-25	Mississippi	R
F	22	(Israel)	Clark, Alysha	5' 11" (1.8m)	167 lb (76kg)	1987-07-07	Middle Tennessee	9
G	9	(United States)	Cloud, Natasha	5' 9" (1.75m)	160 lb (73kg)	1992-02-22	Saint Joseph's	6
G/F	11	(United States)	Delle Donne, Elena	6' 5" (1.96m)	187 lb (85kg)	1989-09-05	Delaware	8
F	21	(United States)	Hawkins, Tianna	6' 3" (1.91m)	186 lb (84kg)	1991-03-02	Maryland	8
F	2	(United States)	Hines-Allen, Myisha	6' 2" (1.88m)	200 lb (91kg)	1996-05-30	Louisville	4
G	23	(United States)	Jones, Jazmine	6' 0" (1.83m)	160 lb (73kg)	1996-10-15	Louisville	3
G	13	(Japan)	Machida, Rui	5' 4" (1.63m)	126 lb (57kg)	1993-03-08	Japan	R
G	32	(United States)	Walker-Kimbrough, Shatori	5' 9" (1.75m)	140 lb (64kg)	1995-05-18	Maryland	5
G	4	(United States)	Westbrook, Evina	6' 0" (1.83m)	158 lb (72kg)	1998-09-28	Connecticut	R
C	1	(United States)	Williams, Elizabeth	6' 3" (1.91m)	200 lb (91kg)	1993-06-23	Duke	7

Head coach
(United States) Mike Thibault (Saint Martin's)
Assistant coaches
(United States) Eric Thibault (Missouri)
(United States) LaToya Sanders (North Carolina)
(United States) Shelley Patterson (Washington State)
Athletic trainer
(United States) Chalisa Fonza (Western Illinois)

Legend

- (C) Team captain
- (DP) Unsigned draft pick
- (FA) Free agent
- (S) Suspended
- Injured

=== Depth ===
Pos.	Starter	Bench
C	Shakira Austin	Elizabeth Williams
PF	Elena Delle Donne	Myisha Hines-Allen; Tianna Hawkins
SF	Alysha Clark	Jazmine Jones
SG	Ariel Atkins	Shatori Walker-Kimbrough; Evina Westbrook
PG	Natasha Cloud	Rui Machida

== Schedule ==
=== Preseason ===
2022 pre-season game log
Total: 1–1 (Home: 1–0; Road: 0–1)
April: 1–1 (Home: 1–0; Road: 0–1)

Game	Date	Team	Score	High points	High rebounds	High assists	Location Attendance	Record
1	April 24	@ Atlanta	L 69–88	Shatori Walker-Kimbrough (13)	Shakira Austin (12)	Myisha Hines-Allen (7)	Gateway Center Arena; 854	0–1
2	April 27	Minnesota	W 78–66	Elena Delle Donne (21)	Shakira Austin (13)	Natasha Cloud (4)	Entertainment and Sports Arena; 3,220	1–1
3	April 30	@ New York	Canceled				Barclays Center	1–1

2022 pre-season schedule

=== Regular season ===
2022 game log
Total: 22–14 (Home: 12–6; Road: 10–8)
May: 7–3 (Home: 3–2; Road: 4–1)

Game	Date	Team	Score	High points	High rebounds	High assists	Location Attendance	Record
1	May 6	Indiana	W 84–70	Elena Delle Donne (21)	Elena Delle Donne (9)	Natasha Cloud (6)	Entertainment and Sports Arena; 4,200	1–0
2	May 8	@ Minnesota	W 78–66	Ariel Atkins (20)	Shakira Austin (10)	Natasha Cloud (6)	Target Center; 8,134	2–0
3	May 10	Las Vegas	W 89–76	Elena Delle Donne (19)	Atkins; Hines-Allen (8)	Myisha Hines-Allen (8)	Entertainment and Sports Arena; 3,082	3–0
4	May 13	Dallas	L 86–94	Elena Delle Donne (20)	Myisha Hines-Allen (7)	Rui Machida (7)	Entertainment and Sports Arena; 3,281	3–1
5	May 17	@ Dallas	W 84–68	Shakira Austin (20)	Shakira Austin (8)	Natasha Cloud (7)	College Park Center; 3,035	4–1
6	May 20	@ Atlanta	W 78–73	Ariel Atkins (18)	Shakira Austin (7)	Natasha Cloud (5)	Gateway Center Arena; N/A	5–1
7	May 22	Chicago	L 73–82	Ariel Atkins (20)	Elena Delle Donne (7)	Natasha Cloud (10)	Entertainment and Sports Arena; 4,200	5–2
8	May 24	Atlanta	W 70–50	Elena Delle Donne (15)	Shakira Austin (7)	Natasha Cloud (7)	Entertainment and Sports Arena; 2,687	6–2
9	May 28	@ Connecticut	L 71–79	Burke; Atkins (13)	Shakira Austin (5)	Natasha Cloud (6)	Mohegan Sun Arena; 5,482	6–3
10	May 31	@ Indiana	W 87–75	Ariel Atkins (28)	Elizabeth Williams (15)	Natasha Cloud (9)	Indiana Farmers Coliseum; 1,009	7–3

June : 6–6 (Home: 4–2; Road: 2–4)

Game	Date	Team	Score	High points	High rebounds	High assists	Location Attendance	Record
11	June 3	New York	L 70–74	Natasha Cloud (17)	Elena Delle Donne (8)	Natasha Cloud (8)	Entertainment and Sports Arena; 3,857	7–4
12	June 5	@ Chicago	L 82–91	Tianna Hawkins (21)	Shakira Austin (7)	Rui Machida (9)	Wintrust Arena; 6,228	7–5
13	June 8	Chicago	W 84–82	Ariel Atkins (19)	Ariel Atkins (7)	Atkins; Cloud (5)	Entertainment and Sports Arena; 2,984	8–5
14	June 10	@ Minnesota	W 76–59	Myisha Hines-Allen (17)	Shakira Austin (13)	Natasha Cloud (8)	Target Center; 6,315	9–5
15	June 12	Phoenix	L 90–99 (OT)	Myisha Hines-Allen (18)	Myisha Hines-Allen (10)	Natasha Cloud (7)	Entertainment and Sports Arena; 4,200	9–6
16	June 14	Phoenix	W 83–65	Shakira Austin (16)	Shakira Austin (10)	Natasha Cloud (10)	Entertainment and Sports Arena; 3,088	10–6
17	June 16	@ New York	L 65–77	Natasha Cloud (17)	Shakira Austin (6)	Natasha Cloud (7)	Barclays Center; 4,168	10–7
18	June 19	Connecticut	W 71–63	Elena Delle Donne (15)	Shakira Austin (8)	Ariel Atkins (6)	Entertainment and Sports Arena; 3,959	11–7
19	June 21	@ Los Angeles	L 82–84	Ariel Atkins (22)	Myisha Hines-Allen (8)	Natasha Cloud (13)	Crypto.com Arena; 3,745	11–8
20	June 23	@ Seattle	L 71–85	Elena Delle Donne (20)	Shakira Austin (9)	Natasha Cloud (8)	Climate Pledge Arena; 9,884	11–9
21	June 25	@ Las Vegas	W 87–86 (OT)	Alysha Clark (20)	Elena Delle Donne (10)	Natasha Cloud (10)	Michelob Ultra Arena; 7,171	12–9
22	June 28	Atlanta	W 92–74	Natasha Cloud (18)	Austin; Hines-Allen (7)	Rui Machida (5)	Entertainment and Sports Arena; 3,517	13–9

July : 6–3 (Home: 3–1; Road: 3–2)

Game	Date	Team	Score	High points	High rebounds	High assists	Location Attendance	Record
23	July 3	@ Connecticut	L 72–74 (OT)	Ariel Atkins (18)	Myisha Hines-Allen (13)	Natasha Cloud (6)	Mohegan Sun Arena; 5,814	13–10
24	July 6	@ Atlanta	W 85–66	Elena Delle Donne (26)	Elena Delle Donne (8)	Natasha Cloud (4)	Gateway Center Arena; 1,810	14–10
25	July 12	@ Los Angeles	W 94–81	Elena Delle Donne (26)	Shakira Austin (8)	Natasha Cloud (9)	Crypto.com Arena; 5,004	15–10
26	July 14	@ Phoenix	L 75–80	Elena Delle Donne (19)	Elena Delle Donne (12)	Natasha Cloud (7)	Footprint Center; 5,994	15–11
27	July 17	Minnesota	W 70–57	Elena Delle Donne (21)	Elena Delle Donne (10)	Natasha Cloud (8)	Entertainment and Sports Arena; 4,200	16–11
28	July 21	New York	W 78–69	Elena Delle Donne (25)	Myisha Hines-Allen (8)	Shatori Walker-Kimbrough (5)	Capital One Arena; 7,431	17–11
29	July 28	@ Dallas	W 87–77	Atkins; Cloud; Hines-Allen (14)	Shakira Austin (5)	Natasha Cloud (7)	College Park Center; 4,382	18–11
30	July 30	Seattle	L 77–82	Elena Delle Donne (22)	Austin; Hines-Allen (10)	Natasha Cloud (11)	Entertainment and Sports Arena; 4,200	18–12
31	July 31	Seattle	W 78–75	Ariel Atkins (23)	Shakira Austin (9)	Natasha Cloud (10)	Entertainment and Sports Arena; 4,200	19–12

August : 3–2 (Home: 2–1; Road: 1–1)

Game	Date	Team	Score	High points	High rebounds	High assists	Location Attendance	Record
32	August 2	Las Vegas	W 83–73	Natasha Cloud (16)	Elena Delle Donne (11)	Natasha Cloud (9)	Entertainment and Sports Arena; 4,200	20–12
33	August 5	@ Chicago	L 83–93	Myisha Hines-Allen (21)	Hines-Allen; E. Williams (6)	Rui Machida (5)	Wintrust Arena; 8,042	20–13
34	August 7	Los Angeles	L 76–79	Atkins; Hines-Allen (20)	Shakira Austin (10)	Natasha Cloud (9)	Entertainment and Sports Arena; 4,200	20–14
35	August 12	@ Indiana	W 82–70	Elena Delle Donne (24)	Shakira Austin (11)	Natasha Cloud (6)	Hinkle Fieldhouse; 1,700	21–14
36	August 14	Indiana	W 95–83	Elena Delle Donne (22)	Shakira Austin (6)	Rui Machida (6)	Entertainment and Sports Arena; 4,200	22–14

2022 season schedule

=== Playoffs ===
2022 playoff game log
First Round vs. Seattle Storm
Lost Series: 0–2

Game	Date	Team	Score	High points	High rebounds	High assists	Location Attendance	Series
1	August 18	@ Seattle	L 83–86	Elena Delle Donne (26)	Shakira Austin (7)	Elena Delle Donne (5)	Climate Pledge Arena; 8,917	0–1
2	August 21	@ Seattle	L 84–97	Natasha Cloud (21)	Shakira Austin (8)	Ariel Atkins (7)	Climate Pledge Arena; 12,490	0–2

2022 playoff schedule

== Standings ==
#	Team	W	L	PCT	GB	Conf.	Home	Road	Cup
1	x – Las Vegas Aces	26	10	.722	–	15–3	13–5	13–5	9–1
2	x – Chicago Sky	26	10	.722	–	15–3	14–4	12–6	9–1
3	x – Connecticut Sun	25	11	.694	1.0	11–7	13–5	12–6	5–5
4	x – Seattle Storm	22	14	.611	4.0	10–8	13–5	9–9	6–4
5	x – Washington Mystics	22	14	.611	4.0	11–7	12–6	10–8	5–5
6	x – Dallas Wings	18	18	.500	8.0	8–10	8–10	10–8	5–5
7	x – New York Liberty	16	20	.444	10.0	10–8	9–9	7–11	6–4
8	x – Phoenix Mercury	15	21	.417	11.0	7–11	11–7	4–14	3–7
9	e – Minnesota Lynx	14	22	.389	12.0	8–10	7–11	7–11	4–6
10	e – Atlanta Dream	14	22	.389	12.0	5–13	8–10	6–12	3–7
11	e – Los Angeles Sparks	13	23	.361	13.0	6–12	7–11	6–12	3–7
12	e – Indiana Fever	5	31	.139	21.0	2–16	3–15	2–16	2–8

Notes

(#) – League Standing
x – Clinched playoff berth
e – Eliminated from playoff contention
Source: Overall standings and Commissioner's Cup Standings

== Playoffs ==
**First round** Best-of-3
**1**	**Las Vegas Aces**	**2**
8	Phoenix Mercury	0
**4**	**Seattle Storm**	**2**
5	Washington Mystics	0
**2**	**Chicago Sky**	**2**
7	New York Liberty	1
**3**	**Connecticut Sun**	**2**
6	Dallas Wings	1

**Semifinals**; Best-of-5
**1**	**Las Vegas Aces**	**3**
4	Seattle Storm	1
2	Chicago Sky	2
**3**	**Connecticut Sun**	**3**

**Finals**; Best-of-5
**1**	**Las Vegas Aces**	**3**
3	Connecticut Sun	1

- **Bold** – Series winner
- Italic – Team with home-court advantage

== Statistics ==
Legend
GP	Games played	GS	Games started	MPG	Minutes per game	RPG	Rebounds per game
APG	Assists per game	SPG	Steals per game	BPG	Blocks per game	PPG	Points per game
FG%	Field-goal percentage	3P%	3-point field-goal percentage	FT%	Free-throw percentage	TO	Turnovers per game
PF	Fouls per game		Team leader		League leader

=== Regular season ===
Player	GP	GS	MPG	FG%	3P%	FT%	RPG	APG	SPG	BPG	PPG
Elena Delle Donne	25	25	27.8	.480	.368	.913	6.3	2.3	0.5	1.1	17.2
Ariel Atkins	36	36	30.0	.420	.365	.845	3.3	2.3	1.4	0.3	14.6
Natasha Cloud	34	34	31.3	.399	.319	.824	3.6	7.0	1.0	0.3	10.7
Myisha Hines-Allen	34	15	19.3	.415	.367	.703	5.3	1.9	0.8	0.3	8.9
Shakira Austin	36	32	21.6	.547	.000	.624	6.5	0.9	0.7	0.8	8.7
Alysha Clark	29	29	26.4	.464	.303	.913	4.5	2.0	0.9	0.3	8.0
Shatori Walker-Kimbrough	35	3	20.1	.402	.347	.902	1.8	1.5	1.1	0.3	6.9
Katie Benzan^{‡}	3	0	9.0	.556	.714	.750	0.7	0.3	0.0	0.3	6.0
Elizabeth Williams	30	0	14.9	.482	.000	.581	3.8	0.5	0.6	0.7	5.4
Kennedy Burke^{‡}	16	4	13.9	.446	.344	.588	2.2	0.4	1.0	0.3	5.4
Tianna Hawkins	25	0	12.8	.386	.264	.952	2.4	0.8	0.4	0.1	4.9
Evina Westbrook^{≠}	6	0	5.3	.667	.500	.833	0.0	0.5	0.3	0.2	3.3
Stephanie Jones^{‡}	3	0	6.3	.429	.500	.000	0.7	0.3	0.3	0.0	2.3
Rui Machida	36	2	12.9	.310	.206	.667	1.1	2.6	0.4	0.1	1.8
Jazmine Jones^{≠}	1	0	3.0	.000	.000	.000	1.0	0.0	0.0	0.0	0.0

^{‡}Waived/Released during the season
^{†}Traded during the season
^{≠}Acquired during the season

=== Playoffs ===
Player	GP	GS	MPG	FG%	3P%	FT%	RPG	APG	SPG	BPG	PPG
Elena Delle Donne	2	2	33.0	.516	.111	1.000	2.5	5.0	0.5	1.0	19.0
Natasha Cloud	2	2	35.5	.500	.700	1.000	6.0	3.0	0.5	1.5	18.5
Ariel Atkins	2	2	33.0	.379	.500	1.000	1.5	5.5	0.5	0.0	15.5
Shatori Walker-Kimbrough	2	0	20.5	.556	.500	1.000	0.0	0.5	1.5	0.0	7.5
Shakira Austin	2	2	27.0	.462	.000	.500	7.5	1.0	1.0	0.5	7.0
Alysha Clark	2	2	25.5	.571	.500	.667	3.5	3.0	1.5	0.5	6.0
Myisha Hines-Allen	2	0	14.5	.182	.000	1.000	3.5	2.0	1.0	0.0	5.0
Rui Machida	2	0	5.5	.667	.000	.250	1.0	0.0	0.0	0.0	2.5
Elizabeth Williams	2	0	5.5	1.000	.000	.250	1.0	0.0	0.0	0.5	2.5

== Awards and honors ==
Recipient	Award	Date awarded	Ref.
Ariel Atkins	WNBA All-Star Selection	June 28	
Ariel Atkins	All-Defensive First Team	August 30	
Elena Delle Donne	Eastern Conference Player of the Week	July 18	
Natasha Cloud	Peak Performer:Assists	August 15	
Natasha Cloud	All-Defensive First Team	August 30	
Shakira Austin	WNBA All-Rookie Team	August 25	
