= 2022 Dallas Wings season =

25th season in the Women's National Basketball Association

- Head coach: Vickie Johnson
- Arena: College Park Center

Results
- Record: 18–18 (.500)
- Place: 3rd (Western)
- Playoff finish: 6th seed; Lost in the first round to the Connecticut Sun

The 2022 Dallas Wings season was the franchise's 25th season in the Women's National Basketball Association and the 7th season for the franchise in Dallas – after relocating from Tulsa and Detroit. This was second season under head coach Vickie Johnson.

The season got off to an up and down start with the Wings losing their first game, but winning the next two. After losing the fourth game of the season, the team went on a three game winning streak. However, they ended the month with two losses and finished May with a 5–4 record. June started with their first five games being against Las Vegas or Seattle and the Wings went 1–4 in those games. In their final six games of the month they went 3–3 to finish June 4–7. Every loss in July was followed by a win, except for two straight losses to Chicago. The Wings finished July 4–5, but solidly in playoff contention. The team's fortunes changed in August when they won their first four games of the month and secured a spot in the 2022 WNBA Playoffs. The Wings announced on August 12 that Arike Ogunbowale would miss the rest of the regular season and the 1st Round of the 2022 WNBA Playoffs after she underwent a iliac crest core muscle avulsion repair. The Wings went 1–2 in regular season games Ogunbowale missed and the team finished August 5–2. Their 18–18 record secured them the sixth seed in the playoffs. The team's eighteen wins, was their most in a reglaur season as the Wings. The last time the franchise won eighteen games in a season was in 2015, when they were known as the Tulsa Shock.

As the sixth seed, Dallas faced off against third seed Connecticut in the first round of the playoffs. Being the lower seed, Dallas would play the first two games of the three game series in Connecticut, with the third game being in Dallas if needed. The Wings lost the first game by twenty five points in Connecticut, but would win the second game by ten to force a deciding game three in Dallas. Home court did not prove advantageous, as the Wings lost game three by fifteen points. Their 58 points in game three was their lowest point total of the season.

== Transactions ==
=== WNBA draft ===
Round	Pick	Player	School/team/country	Nationality
1	7	Veronica Burton	United States	Northwestern
3	30	Jasmine Dickey	United States	Delaware
3	31	Jazz Bond	United States	North Florida

=== Trades and Roster Changes ===
Date	Transaction
December 2, 2021	Exercised Team Options on Satou Sabally, Tyasha Harris, and Bella Alarie
January 7, 2022	Waived Luisa Geiselsöder
February 3, 2022	Signed Arike Ogunbowale to a Multi-Year Extension
March 2, 2022	Renounced the rights to Imani McGee-Stafford
March 3, 2022	Signed Destinee Walker to a training-camp contract
March 7, 2022	Signed Morgan Bertsch and Unique Thompson to training-camp contracts
March 8, 2022	Traded the 4th and 6th Picks in the 2022 WNBA draft and a 2023 First Round Pick to the Indiana Fever in exchange for Teaira McCowan, the 7th Pick in the 2022 Draft and Chicago's 2023 First Round Pick
April 7, 2022	Placed Bella Alarie on the Full-Season Suspension List for Personal Reasons
April 13, 2022	Signed Veronica Burton, Jasmine Dickey, and Jazz Bond to rookie-scale contracts
April 26, 2022	Waived Chelsea Dungee and Jazz Bond
April 29, 2022	Waived Morgan Bertsch
May 2, 2022	Waived Destinee Walker
May 5, 2022	Waived Unique Thompson
May 5, 2022	Temporarily Suspend Satou Sabally and Teaira McCowan due to Overseas Commitments
May 9, 2022	Waived Moriah Jefferson
May 10, 2022	Activated Teaira McCowan from her Temporary Suspension
May 17, 2022	Activated Satou Sabally from her Temporary Suspension

== Roster ==
2022 Dallas Wings roster
Players
Coaches

Pos.	No.	Nat.	Name	Height	Weight	DOB	From	Yrs
G	12	(United States)	Burton, Veronica	5' 9" (1.75m)	155 lb (70kg)	2000-07-12	Northwestern	R
C	35	(United States)	Collier, Charli	6' 5" (1.96m)	188 lb (85kg)	1999-09-22	Texas	1
G/F	23	(United States)	Dickey, Jasmine	5' 9" (1.75m)	147 lb (67kg)	2000-02-23	Delaware	R
G	15	(United States)	Gray, Allisha	6' 0" (1.83m)	167 lb (76kg)	1995-01-12	South Carolina	5
G	52	(United States)	Harris, Tyasha	5' 10" (1.78m)	152 lb (69kg)	1998-05-01	South Carolina	2
F	20	(United States)	Harrison, Isabelle	6' 3" (1.91m)	183 lb (83kg)	1993-09-27	Tennessee	5
F/C	28	(Finland)	Kuier, Awak	6' 4" (1.93m)	168 lb (76kg)	2001-08-19	Finland	1
G	3	(United States)	Mabrey, Marina	5' 11" (1.8m)	170 lb (77kg)	1996-09-14	Notre Dame	3
C	7	(United States)	McCowan, Teaira	6' 7" (2.01m)	239 lb (108kg)	1996-09-28	Mississippi State	3
G	24	(United States)	Ogunbowale, Arike	5' 8" (1.73m)	165 lb (75kg)	1997-03-02	Notre Dame	3
F	0	(Germany)	Sabally, Satou	6' 4" (1.93m)		1998-04-25	Oregon	2
F	6	(United States)	Thornton, Kayla	6' 1" (1.85m)	188 lb (85kg)	1992-10-20	UTEP	6

Head coach
(Australia) Vickie Johnson (Louisiana Tech)
Assistant coaches
(United States) Le'coe Willingham (Auburn)
(United States) Kelly Schumacher (Connecticut)
(United States) Tim Gittens (Milwaukee)
Athletic trainer
(United States) Branay Hicks (UT Tyler)

Legend

- (C) Team captain
- (DP) Unsigned draft pick
- (FA) Free agent
- (S) Suspended
- Injured

=== Depth ===
Pos.	Starter	Bench
C	Teaira McCowan	Isabelle Harrison; Charli Collier
PF	Kayla Thornton	Awak Kuier; Satou Sabally
SF	Allisha Gray	Jasmine Dickey
SG	Arike Ogunbowale	Veronica Burton; Jasmine Dickey
PG	Marina Mabrey	Tyasha Harris

== Schedule ==
=== Preseason ===
2022 pre-season game log
April: 1–0 (Home: 0–0; Road: 1–0)

Game	Date	Team	Score	High points	High rebounds	High assists	Location Attendance	Record
1	April 25	@ Chicago	W 92–77	Marina Mabrey (24)	Unique Thompson (10)	Burton; Harris (5)	Wintrust Arena; N/A	1–0

May : 1–0 (Home: 1–0; Road: 0–0)

Game	Date	Team	Score	High points	High rebounds	High assists	Location Attendance	Record
2	May 2	Indiana	W 101–89	Isabelle Harrison (18)	Harrison; Kuier (8)	Veronica Burton (6)	College Park Center; N/A	2–0

2022 pre-season schedule

=== Regular season ===
2022 game log
Total: 18–18 (Home: 8–10; Road: 10–8)
May: 5–4 (Home: 1–2; Road: 4–2)

Game	Date	Team	Score	High points	High rebounds	High assists	Location Attendance	Record
1	May 7	Atlanta	L 59–66	Marina Mabrey (20)	Allisha Gray (9)	Gray; Harrison; Burton (2)	College Park Center; 5,796	0–1
2	May 13	@ Washington	W 94–86	Arike Ogunbowale (27)	Isabelle Harrison (10)	Tyasha Harris (10)	Entertainment and Sports Arena; 3,281	1–1
3	May 15	@ New York	W 81–71	Arike Ogunbowale (21)	Isabelle Harrison (10)	Ogunbowale; Thornton (4)	Barclays Center; 3,095	2–1
4	May 17	Washington	L 68–84	Harrison; Mabrey (16)	Kayla Thornton (8)	Marina Mabrey (5)	College Park Center; 3,035	2–2
5	May 19	@ Phoenix	W 94–84	Arike Ogunbowale (37)	Kayla Thornton (11)	Marina Mabrey (10)	Footprint Center; 6,151	3–2
6	May 21	Minnesota	W 94–78	Marina Mabrey (22)	Mabrey; Sabally; Thornton (5)	Arike Ogunbowale (7)	College Park Center; 3,813	4–2
7	May 24	@ Connecticut	W 85–77	Marina Mabrey (20)	Kayla Thornton (10)	Marina Mabrey (4)	Mohegan Sun Arena; 4,180	5–2
8	May 26	@ Connecticut	L 68–99	Satou Sabally (18)	Isabelle Harrison (7)	Mabrey; Harris (4)	Mohegan Sun Arena; 4,308	5–3
9	May 31	@ Los Angeles	L 91–93	Isabelle Harrison (20)	Isabelle Harrison (8)	Satou Sabally (4)	Crypto.com Arena; 4,852	5–4

June : 4–7 (Home: 3–4; Road: 1–3)

Game	Date	Team	Score	High points	High rebounds	High assists	Location Attendance	Record
10	June 3	@ Seattle	W 68–51	Allisha Gray (18)	Satou Sabally (11)	Satou Sabally (6)	Climate Pledge Arena; 8,023	6–4
11	June 5	@ Las Vegas	L 78–84	Allisha Gray (24)	Kayla Thornton (15)	Tyasha Harris (5)	Michelob Ultra Arena; 4,814	6–5
12	June 10	Seattle	L 88–89	Arike Ogunbowale (23)	Harrison; Thornton (6)	Harris; Ogunbowale (6)	College Park Center; 3,292	6–6
13	June 12	Seattle	L 79–84	Allisha Gray (20)	Kayla Thornton (14)	Tyasha Harris (6)	College Park Center; 3,273	6–7
14	June 15	Las Vegas	L 84–92	Arike Ogunbowale (28)	Harrison; Thornton (10)	Arike Ogunbowale (4)	College Park Center; 4,375	6–8
15	June 17	Phoenix	W 93–88	Arike Ogunbowale (24)	Teaira McCowan (10)	Arike Ogunbowale (6)	College Park Center; 3,140	7–8
16	June 19	Los Angeles	W 92–82	Arike Ogunbowale (27)	Allisha Gray (12)	Allisha Gray (6)	College Park Center; 3,779	8–8
17	June 21	@ Atlanta	L 75–80	Allisha Gray (18)	Kayla Thornton (7)	Gray; Mabrey (4)	Gateway Center Arena; N/A	8–9
18	June 23	Indiana	W 94–68	Arike Ogunbowale (24)	Teaira McCowan (10)	Arike Ogunbowale (6)	College Park Center; 2,791	9–9
19	June 25	Phoenix	L 72–83	Arike Ogunbowale (25)	Isabelle Harrison (10)	Arike Ogunbowale (6)	College Park Center; 4,240	9–10
20	June 28	@ Minnesota	L 64–92	Arike Ogunbowale (16)	Harrison; McCowan (8)	Arike Ogunbowale (3)	Target Center; 5,603	9–11

July : 4–5 (Home: 1–3; Road: 3–2)

Game	Date	Team	Score	High points	High rebounds	High assists	Location Attendance	Record
21	July 1	Los Angeles	L 89–97	Arike Ogunbowale (23)	Teaira McCowan (10)	Allisha Gray (4)	College Park Center; 3,187	9–12
22	July 5	Connecticut	W 82–71	Arike Ogunbowale (20)	Allisha Gray (8)	Marina Mabrey (5)	College Park Center; 3,445	10–12
23	July 12	@ Seattle	L 74–83	Teaira McCowan (18)	Teaira McCowan (10)	Marina Mabrey (5)	Climate Pledge Arena; 9,486	10–13
24	July 14	@ Minnesota	W 92–87	Arike Ogunbowale (32)	Teaira McCowan (8)	Tyasha Harris (6)	Target Center; 4,834	11–13
25	July 16	Chicago	L 81–89	Marina Mabrey (22)	Teaira McCowan (6)	Marina Mabrey (3)	College Park Center; 5,126	11–14
26	July 22	@ Chicago	L 83–89	Arike Ogunbowale (28)	Gray; Mabrey (7)	Tyasha Harris (6)	Wintrust Arena; 7,014	11–15
27	July 24	@ Indiana	W 96–86	Arike Ogunbowale (22)	Kayla Thornton (8)	Ogunbowale; Thornton (5)	Hinkle Fieldhouse; 1,048	12–15
28	July 28	Washington	L 77–88	Teaira McCowan (27)	Teaira McCowan (11)	Marina Mabrey (4)	College Park Center; 4,382	12–16
29	July 30	@ Atlanta	W 81–68	Ogunbowale; Thornton (21)	Teaira McCowan (14)	Gray; Ogunbowale (8)	Gateway Center Arena; 3,138	13–16

August : 5–2 (Home: 3–1; Road: 2–1)

Game	Date	Team	Score	High points	High rebounds	High assists	Location Attendance	Record
30	August 2	@ Chicago	W 84–78	Marina Mabrey (26)	Teaira McCowan (12)	Veronica Burton (9)	Wintrust Arena; 5,602	14–16
31	August 4	Las Vegas	W 82–80	Teaira McCowan (21)	Teaira McCowan (16)	Tyasha Harris (6)	College Park Center; 3,492	15–16
32	August 6	Indiana	W 95–91 (OT)	Kayla Thornton (21)	Teaira McCowan (14)	Marina Mabrey (8)	College Park Center; 4,184	16–16
33	August 8	New York	W 86–77	Marina Mabrey (31)	Teaira McCowan (9)	Gray; Mabrey (4)	College Park Center; 3,036	17–16
34	August 10	New York	L 73–91	Marina Mabrey (19)	Teaira McCowan (13)	Marina Mabrey (6)	College Park Center; 3,795	17–17
35	August 12	@ Phoenix	L 74–86	Kayla Thornton (14)	Teaira McCowan (9)	Marina Mabrey (6)	Footprint Center; 8,047	17–18
36	August 14	@ Los Angeles	W 116–88	Marina Mabrey (27)	Teaira McCowan (8)	Tyasha Harris (11)	Crypto.com Arena; 7,245	18–18

2022 season schedule

=== Playoffs ===
2022 playoff game log
First Round vs. Connecticut Sun
Lost Series: 1–2

Game	Date	Team	Score	High points	High rebounds	High assists	Location Attendance	Series
1	August 18	@ Connecticut	L 68–93	Allisha Gray (17)	Gray; Harris; McCowan (5)	Burton; Harris (3)	Mohegan Sun Arena; 4,797	0–1
2	August 21	@ Connecticut	W 89–79	Kayla Thornton (20)	Teaira McCowan (11)	Allisha Gray (8)	Mohegan Sun Arena; 6,788	1–1
3	August 24	Connecticut	L 58–73	Marina Mabrey (20)	Teaira McCowan (12)	Burton; Gray (4)	College Park Center; 5,016	1–2

2022 playoff schedule

== Standings ==
#	Team	W	L	PCT	GB	Conf.	Home	Road	Cup
1	x – Las Vegas Aces	26	10	.722	–	15–3	13–5	13–5	9–1
2	x – Chicago Sky	26	10	.722	–	15–3	14–4	12–6	9–1
3	x – Connecticut Sun	25	11	.694	1.0	11–7	13–5	12–6	5–5
4	x – Seattle Storm	22	14	.611	4.0	10–8	13–5	9–9	6–4
5	x – Washington Mystics	22	14	.611	4.0	11–7	12–6	10–8	5–5
6	x – Dallas Wings	18	18	.500	8.0	8–10	8–10	10–8	5–5
7	x – New York Liberty	16	20	.444	10.0	10–8	9–9	7–11	6–4
8	x – Phoenix Mercury	15	21	.417	11.0	7–11	11–7	4–14	3–7
9	e – Minnesota Lynx	14	22	.389	12.0	8–10	7–11	7–11	4–6
10	e – Atlanta Dream	14	22	.389	12.0	5–13	8–10	6–12	3–7
11	e – Los Angeles Sparks	13	23	.361	13.0	6–12	7–11	6–12	3–7
12	e – Indiana Fever	5	31	.139	21.0	2–16	3–15	2–16	2–8

Notes

(#) – League Standing
x – Clinched playoff berth
e – Eliminated from playoff contention
Source: Overall standings and Commissioner's Cup Standings

== Playoffs ==
**First round** Best-of-3
**1**	**Las Vegas Aces**	**2**
8	Phoenix Mercury	0
**4**	**Seattle Storm**	**2**
5	Washington Mystics	0
**2**	**Chicago Sky**	**2**
7	New York Liberty	1
**3**	**Connecticut Sun**	**2**
6	Dallas Wings	1

**Semifinals**; Best-of-5
**1**	**Las Vegas Aces**	**3**
4	Seattle Storm	1
2	Chicago Sky	2
**3**	**Connecticut Sun**	**3**

**Finals**; Best-of-5
**1**	**Las Vegas Aces**	**3**
3	Connecticut Sun	1

- **Bold** – Series winner
- Italic – Team with home-court advantage

== Statistics ==
Legend
GP	Games played	GS	Games started	MPG	Minutes per game	RPG	Rebounds per game
APG	Assists per game	SPG	Steals per game	BPG	Blocks per game	PPG	Points per game
FG%	Field-goal percentage	3P%	3-point field-goal percentage	FT%	Free-throw percentage	TO	Turnovers per game
PF	Fouls per game		Team leader		League leader

=== Regular season ===
Player	GP	GS	MPG	FG%	3P%	FT%	RPG	APG	SPG	BPG	PPG
Arike Ogunbowale	30	30	31.4	.400	.352	.798	3.3	3.6	1.5	0.1	19.7
Marina Mabrey	34	32	28.0	.420	.351	.681	3.6	3.7	0.8	0.4	13.6
Allisha Gray	33	33	32.9	.423	.408	.798	4.8	2.5	1.1	0.7	13.3
Satou Sabally	11	6	21.7	.398	.233	.914	4.8	2.1	0.5	0.2	11.3
Teaira McCowan	33	15	18.9	.602	.000	.600	7.0	0.8	0.3	0.7	11.0
Isabelle Harrison	35	18	18.4	.466	1.000	.867	4.3	1.3	0.7	0.1	8.7
Kayla Thornton	36	35	29.2	.471	.329	.829	5.9	1.8	1.1	0.6	8.0
Tyasha Harris	35	5	15.8	.416	.309	.792	0.9	2.8	0.4	0.1	5.0
Awak Kuier	33	0	12.6	.395	.190	.613	2.5	0.9	0.4	0.9	2.8
Veronica Burton	36	6	15.2	.329	.279	1.000	1.5	1.9	0.9	0.3	2.6
Charli Collier	17	0	4.6	.444	.000	.714	0.6	0.1	0.1	0.0	2.0
Jasmine Dickey	20	0	4.7	.212	.250	.667	0.6	0.1	0.2	0.1	1.1
Moriah Jefferson^{‡}	1	0	4.0	.000	.000	.000	0.0	0.0	0.0	0.0	0.0

^{‡}Waived/Released during the season
^{†}Traded during the season
^{≠}Acquired during the season

=== Playoffs ===
Player	GP	GS	MPG	FG%	3P%	FT%	RPG	APG	SPG	BPG	PPG
Marina Mabrey	3	3	32.7	.429	.455	1.000	4.0	1.7	0.7	0.7	15.0
Allisha Gray	3	3	35.7	.484	.231	.600	3.7	4.7	1.7	0.3	13.0
Teaira McCowan	3	1	24.7	.480	.000	.533	9.3	1.0	0.3	1.7	10.7
Kayla Thornton	3	3	26.3	.526	.500	1.000	4.7	1.3	0.3	0.7	8.3
Satou Sabally	3	0	15.3	.333	.300	.800	1.3	3.0	0.0	0.3	7.0
Veronica Burton	3	3	28.0	.400	.300	.800	2.7	3.3	2.0	0.3	6.3
Tyasha Harris	3	0	12.3	.538	.000	1.000	2.3	2.3	0.3	0.3	6.0
Isabelle Harrison	3	2	12.3	.538	.000	1.000	1.7	0.3	0.3	0.0	5.3
Arike Ogunbowale	1	0	6.0	.000	.000	.000	0.0	0.0	0.0	0.0	0.0
Awak Kuier	3	0	5.0	.000	.000	.000	1.7	0.0	0.0	0.7	0.0
Jasmine Dickey	1	0	2.0	.000	.000	.000	0.0	0.0	0.0	0.0	0.0

== Awards and honors ==
Recipient	Award	Date awarded	Ref.
Arike Ogunbowale	WNBA All-Star Selection	June 28	
Teaira McCowan	Western Conference Player of the Week	August 8	
Teaira McCowan	Western Conference Player of the Month – August	August 16	
Vickie Johnson	WNBA Coach of the Month – August	August 16	
