= 2022 Los Angeles Sparks season =

- Head coach: Derek Fisher (Until June 7); Fred Williams (Interim, from July 7th-present)
- Arena: Crypto.com Arena

Results
- Record: 13–23 (.361)
- Place: 6th (Western)
- Playoff finish: Did not qualify

Media
- Television: Spectrum SportsNet; ESPN; CBS/CBS Sports Network; NBA TV

The 2022 Los Angeles Sparks season was the 26th season for the Los Angeles Sparks of the Women's National Basketball Association. The season tipped off on May 6, 2022, versus the Chicago Sky.

The Sparks started the season well with road wins over Chicago and Indiana, but could not hold onto that momentum as they lost the next five games in a row. They broke the streak by winning three of their next four games to finish May 5–6. They would open June with a loss and on June 7, 2022, the Sparks and head coach Derek Fisher parted ways after starting the season 5–7, and Fred Williams was named the interim head coach. Williams' tenure started with back to back losses, but the Sparks won two of their last four games in June to finish the month 2–5. The team won its first three games in July before losing their next three. Two wins were followed by three losses to finish July 5–6. The team began August in the playoff hunt, but three straight losses extended their losing streak to six total and dashed their playoff hopes. A win at Washington would be the Sparks' only win in August as they finished the season with three straight home losses. They finished the month 1–6 and the season 13–23.

== Transactions ==
=== WNBA draft ===
Round	Pick	Player	Nationality	School/team/country
1	9	Rae Burrell	United States	Tennessee
2	16	Kianna Smith	United States	Louisville
2	19	Olivia Nelson-Ododa	United States	UConn
3	27	Amy Atwell	United States	Hawaii

=== Trades and Roster Changes ===
Date	Transaction
December 31, 2021	Renounced the rights to Marianna Tolo and Aina Ayuso
January 1, 2022	Extended Qualifying Offers to Te'a Cooper and Lauren Cox
January 4, 2022	Signed Lauren Cox to a Qualifying Offer
January 20, 2022	Signed Te'a Cooper to a Qualifying Offer
February 3, 2022	Traded Gabby Williams to Seattle in exchange for Katie Lou Samuelson and the 9th pick in the 2022 WNBA draft.
February 5, 2022	Traded Erica Wheeler, a 2023 First-Round Pick, and 2022 Second-Round Pick to the Atlanta Dream in exchange for Chennedy Carter and the rights to Li Yueru
February 8, 2022	Signed Jordin Canada to a One-Year Deal
February 18, 2022	Signed Liz Cambage
March 30, 2022	Trade the rights to Li Yueru to the Chicago Sky in exchange for Lexie Brown
April 15, 2022	Signed Chantel Horvat and Lexi Gordan to training-camp contracts
April 16, 2022	Signed Rae Burrell, Kianna Smith, and Amy Atwell to rookie-scale contracts
April 17, 2022	Signed Olivia Nelson-Ododa to a rookie-scale contract
April 29, 2022	Waived Lauren Cox, Chantel Horvat, and Lexi Gordan
May 4, 2022	Waived Te'a Cooper, Arella Guirantes, and Kianna Smith
May 5, 2022	Temporarily Suspend Kristi Toliver and Katie Lou Samuelson due to NBA and Overseas Commitments
May 5, 2022	Full Season suspension of the contract of Amanda Zahui B
May 11, 2022	Exercised the 4th Year Team Option on Chennedy Carter
May 16, 2022	Signed Katie Lou Samuelson to a One Year Extension
May 17, 2022	Activated Katie Lou Samuelson from her Temporary Suspension
June 7, 2022	Fired Head coach/GM Derek Fisher and named Fred Williams as Interim Head coach
June 7, 2022	Waived Amy Atwell
June 9, 2022	Activated Kristi Toliver from her Temporary Suspension
July 4, 2022	Signed Kianna Smith to a 7-Day Hardship Contract
July 26, 2022	Waived Liz Cambage
July 26, 2022	Signed Kianna Smith to a 2nd 7-day contract
August 2, 2022	Signed Kianna Smith

== Roster ==
2022 Los Angeles Sparks roster
Players
Coaches

Pos.	No.	Nat.	Name	Height	Weight	DOB	From	Yrs
G	4	(United States)	Brown, Lexie	5' 9" (1.75m)	162 lb (73kg)	1994-10-24	Duke	4
G/F	12	(United States)	Burrell, Rae (injured)	6' 2" (1.88m)	168 lb (76kg)	2000-06-21	Tennessee	R
G	21	(United States)	Canada, Jordin	5' 6" (1.68m)	135 lb (61kg)	1995-08-11	UCLA	4
G	7	(United States)	Carter, Chennedy	5' 9" (1.75m)	143 lb (65kg)	1998-11-14	Texas A&M	2
C	10	(United States)	Nelson-Ododa, Olivia	6' 5" (1.96m)	173 lb (78kg)	2000-08-17	Connecticut	R
F	30	(United States)	Ogwumike, Nneka	6' 2" (1.88m)	174 lb (79kg)	1990-07-02	Stanford	10
F/C	13	(United States)	Ogwumike, Chiney	6' 3" (1.91m)	183 lb (83kg)	1992-03-21	Stanford	5
F	33	(United States)	Samuelson, Katie Lou	6' 3" (1.91m)	163 lb (74kg)	1997-06-13	Connecticut	3
G	5	(United States)	Smith, Kianna	6' 0" (1.83m)	162 lb (73kg)	1994-06-10	Louisville	R
G	15	(United States)	Sykes, Brittney	5' 9" (1.75m)	154 lb (70kg)	1994-02-07	Syracuse	5
G	20	(United States)	Toliver, Kristi (injured)	5' 7" (1.7m)	130 lb (59kg)	1987-01-27	Maryland	12
F	40	(United States)	Walker, Jasmine	6' 3" (1.91m)	182 lb (83kg)	1998-02-03	Alabama	1

Head coach
(United States) Fred Williams (Boise State)
Assistant coaches
(United States) Latricia Trammell (East Central)
(United States) Seimone Augustus (LSU)
Athletic trainer
(United States) Courtney Watson (California)
Strength and conditioning coach
(United States) Kelly Dormandy (Springfield)

Legend

- (C) Team captain
- (DP) Unsigned draft pick
- (FA) Free agent
- (S) Suspended
- Injured

=== Depth ===
Pos.	Starter	Bench
C	Chiney Ogwumike	Olivia Nelson-Ododa
PF	Nneka Ogwumike	Jasmine Walker
SF	Katie Lou Samuelson	Rae Burrell
SG	Brittney Sykes	Lexie Brown; Kianna Smith
PG	Kristi Toliver	Jordin Canada; Chennedy Carter

== Schedule ==
=== Preseason ===
2022 pre-season game log
Total: 1–1 (Home: 1–0; Road: 0–1)
April: 1–1 (Home: 1–0; Road: 0–1)

Game	Date	Team	Score	High points	High rebounds	High assists	Location Attendance	Record
1	April 23	@ Seattle	L 68–81	Olivia Nelson-Ododa (15)	Olivia Nelson-Ododa (12)	Olivia Nelson-Ododa (5)	Climate Pledge Arena; 5,734	0–1
2	April 30	Phoenix	W 87-84	Amy Atwell (19)	Olivia Nelson-Ododa (6)	Jordin Canada (3)	Matadome; N/A	1-1

2022 pre-season schedule

=== Regular season ===
2022 game log
Total: 13–23 (Home: 7–11; Road: 6–12)
May: 5–6 (Home: 2–1; Road: 3–5)

Game	Date	Team	Score	High points	High rebounds	High assists	Location Attendance	Record
1	May 6	@ Chicago	W 98–91 (OT)	Jordin Canada (21)	Nneka Ogwumike (7)	Jordin Canada (8)	Wintrust Arena; 8,111	1–0
2	May 8	@ Indiana	W 88–78	Liz Cambage (22)	Liz Cambage (11)	Jordin Canada (6)	Gainbridge Fieldhouse; 1,456	2–0
3	May 11	@ Atlanta	L 75–77	Jordin Canada (19)	Nneka Ogwumike (15)	Nneka Ogwumike (4)	Gateway Center Arena; 3,138	2–1
4	May 14	@ Connecticut	L 60–77	Canada; N. Ogwumike (12)	Cambage; Walker (4)	Brittney Sykes (4)	Mohegan Sun Arena; 5,624	2–2
5	May 17	Minnesota	L 84–87	Nneka Ogwumike (22)	Nneka Ogwumike (8)	Jordin Canada (6)	Crypto.com Arena; 4,701	2–3
6	May 20	@ Seattle	L 80–83	Liz Cambage (25)	Liz Cambage (8)	Lexie Brown (5)	Climate Pledge Arena; 10,103	2–4
7	May 23	@ Las Vegas	L 76–104	Chennedy Carter (17)	Nneka Ogwumike (6)	Jordin Canada (9)	Michelob Ultra Arena; 4,092	2–5
8	May 25	Phoenix	W 99–94	Nneka Ogwumike (23)	Liz Cambage (7)	Jordin Canada (6)	Crypto.com Arena; 4,020	3–5
9	May 27	@ Indiana	L 96–101	Nneka Ogwumike (30)	Nneka Ogwumike (10)	Canada; Carter; Sykes (5)	Indiana Farmers Coliseum; 1,417	3–6
10	May 29	@ Minnesota	W 85–83	Chennedy Carter (20)	Chennedy Carter (6)	Carter; Sykes (4)	Target Center; 7,234	4–6
11	May 31	Dallas	W 93–91	Brittney Sykes (25)	Nneka Ogwumike (10)	Cambage; Sykes (4)	Crypto.com Arena; 4,852	5–6

June : 2–5 (Home: 1–3; Road: 1–2)

Game	Date	Team	Score	High points	High rebounds	High assists	Location Attendance	Record
12	June 5	@ Phoenix	L 74–81	Nneka Ogwumike (19)	Nneka Ogwumike (7)	Canada; Samuelson (4)	Footprint Center; 10,151	5–7
13	June 11	Las Vegas	L 72–89	Nneka Ogwumike (16)	Nneka Ogwumike (9)	Jordin Canada (8)	Crypto.com Arena; 8,200	5–8
14	June 19	@ Dallas	L 82–92	Nneka Ogwumike (17)	C. Ogwumike; N. Ogwumike (10)	Liz Cambage (5)	College Park Center; 3,779	5–9
15	June 21	Washington	W 84–82	Nneka Ogwumike (21)	Chiney Ogwumike (9)	Kristi Toliver (5)	Crypto.com Arena; 3,745	6–9
16	June 23	Chicago	L 59–82	Nneka Ogwumike (15)	Olivia Nelson-Ododa (6)	Kristi Toliver (6)	Crypto.com Arena; 5,627	6–10
17	June 25	@ Seattle	W 85–77	Nneka Ogwumike (24)	Cambage; Nelson-Ododa (8)	Brittney Sykes (8)	Climate Pledge Arena; 9,955	7–10
18	June 27	Las Vegas	L 73–79	Nneka Ogwumike (18)	Cambage; N. Ogwumike (11)	Brittney Sykes (7)	Crypto.com Arena; 4,200	7–11

July : 5–6 (Home: 4–4; Road: 1–2)

Game	Date	Team	Score	High points	High rebounds	High assists	Location Attendance	Record
19	July 1	@ Dallas	W 97–89	Cambage; N. Ogwumike (22)	Liz Cambage (11)	Kristi Toliver (7)	College Park Center; 3,187	8–11
20	July 3	New York	W 84–74	Nneka Ogwumike (22)	Chiney Ogwumike (10)	Jordin Canada (7)	Crypto.com Arena; 5,436	9–11
21	July 4	Phoenix	W 78–75	Nneka Ogwumike (23)	Nneka Ogwumike (9)	Jordin Canada (5)	Crypto.com Arena; 3,340	10–11
22	July 7	Seattle	L 69–106	Lexie Brown (16)	Cambage; Nelson-Ododa; N. Ogwumike; Walker (4)	Jordin Canada (6)	Crypto.com Arena; 6,389	10–12
23	July 12	Washington	L 81–94	Samuelson; Sykes (16)	Chiney Ogwumike (10)	Canada; Cambage (3)	Crypto.com Arena; 5,004	10–13
24	July 14	Chicago	L 68–80	Nneka Ogwumike (16)	Chiney Ogwumike (13)	Jordin Canada (8)	Crypto.com Arena; 5,856	10–14
25	July 19	Indiana	W 86–79	Nneka Ogwumike (35)	Chiney Ogwumike (10)	Jordin Canada (8)	Crypto.com Arena; 5,478	11–14
26	July 21	Atlanta	W 85–78	Nneka Ogwumike (20)	Chiney Ogwumike (7)	Jordin Canada (6)	Crypto.com Arena; 10,021	12–14
27	July 23	@ Las Vegas	L 66–84	Chennedy Carter (15)	Jordin Canada (7)	Canada; Samuelson (3)	Michelob Ultra Arena; 7,522	12–15
28	July 28	@ Phoenix	L 80–90	Chennedy Carter (23)	Nneka Ogwumike (11)	Nneka Ogwumike (5)	Footprint Center; 8,124	12–16
29	July 31	Minnesota	L 77–84	Nneka Ogwumike (23)	Chiney Ogwumike (6)	Jordin Canada (6)	Crypto.com Arena; 6,857	12–17

August : 1–6 (Home: 0–3; Road: 1–3)

Game	Date	Team	Score	High points	High rebounds	High assists	Location Attendance	Record
30	August 2	@ New York	L 73–102	Brittney Sykes (19)	Brittney Sykes (6)	Jordin Canada (4)	Barclays Center; 4,891	12–18
31	August 3	@ New York	L 61–64	Nneka Ogwumike (19)	Olivia Nelson-Ododa (10)	Jordin Canada (8)	Barclays Center; 5,315	12–19
32	August 5	@ Atlanta	L 86–88	Brittney Sykes (23)	Brittney Sykes (7)	Jordin Canada (8)	Gateway Center Arena; 3,138	12–20
33	August 7	@ Washington	W 79–76	Brittney Sykes (21)	N. Ogwumike; Sykes (6)	Jordin Canada (12)	Entertainment and Sports Arena; 4,200	13–20
34	August 9	Connecticut	L 71–97	Brittney Sykes (18)	Brittney Sykes (7)	Jordin Canada (6)	Crypto.com Arena; 5,789	13–21
35	August 11	Connecticut	L 69–93	Brittney Sykes (18)	Nneka Ogwumike (9)	Jordin Canada (5)	Crypto.com Arena; 4,987	13–22
36	August 14	Dallas	L 88–116	Brittney Sykes (35)	Jasmine Walker (6)	Canada; Sykes (5)	Crypto.com Arena; 7,245	13–23

2022 season schedule

== Standings ==
#	Team	W	L	PCT	GB	Conf.	Home	Road	Cup
1	x – Las Vegas Aces	26	10	.722	–	15–3	13–5	13–5	9–1
2	x – Chicago Sky	26	10	.722	–	15–3	14–4	12–6	9–1
3	x – Connecticut Sun	25	11	.694	1.0	11–7	13–5	12–6	5–5
4	x – Seattle Storm	22	14	.611	4.0	10–8	13–5	9–9	6–4
5	x – Washington Mystics	22	14	.611	4.0	11–7	12–6	10–8	5–5
6	x – Dallas Wings	18	18	.500	8.0	8–10	8–10	10–8	5–5
7	x – New York Liberty	16	20	.444	10.0	10–8	9–9	7–11	6–4
8	x – Phoenix Mercury	15	21	.417	11.0	7–11	11–7	4–14	3–7
9	e – Minnesota Lynx	14	22	.389	12.0	8–10	7–11	7–11	4–6
10	e – Atlanta Dream	14	22	.389	12.0	5–13	8–10	6–12	3–7
11	e – Los Angeles Sparks	13	23	.361	13.0	6–12	7–11	6–12	3–7
12	e – Indiana Fever	5	31	.139	21.0	2–16	3–15	2–16	2–8

Notes

(#) – League Standing
x – Clinched playoff berth
e – Eliminated from playoff contention
Source: Overall standings and Commissioner's Cup Standings

== Statistics ==
Legend
GP	Games played	GS	Games started	MPG	Minutes per game	RPG	Rebounds per game
APG	Assists per game	SPG	Steals per game	BPG	Blocks per game	PPG	Points per game
FG%	Field-goal percentage	3P%	3-point field-goal percentage	FT%	Free-throw percentage	TO	Turnovers per game
PF	Fouls per game		Team leader		League leader

=== Regular season ===
Player	GP	GS	MPG	FG%	3P%	FT%	RPG	APG	SPG	BPG	PPG
Nneka Ogwumike	34	34	31.4	.544	.368	.826	6.6	2.0	1.6	0.4	18.1
Liz Cambage^{‡}	25	24	23.4	.509	.286	.784	6.4	2.1	0.6	1.6	13.0
Brittney Sykes	32	24	28.8	.433	.269	.770	3.7	3.7	2.0	0.7	12.7
Katie Lou Samuelson	32	29	29.5	.373	.352	.837	3.0	1.9	1.0	0.2	9.7
Jordin Canada	32	25	27.0	.384	.140	.806	2.3	5.5	1.4	0.2	9.2
Chennedy Carter	24	2	16.4	.450	.200	.745	1.9	1.9	0.6	0.4	8.9
Lexie Brown	34	16	25.0	.441	.398	.667	2.3	2.1	1.0	0.2	7.1
Chiney Ogwumike	26	7	18.4	.466	.444	.706	5.5	1.1	0.8	0.3	7.0
Kristi Toliver	11	10	19.8	.373	.361	.875	0.8	3.1	0.4	0.0	4.0
Olivia Nelson-Ododa	30	6	14.5	.566	.000	.703	2.9	0.4	0.3	0.8	4.0
Kianna Smith^{≠}	11	0	10.3	.314	.278	1.000	0.8	0.5	0.4	0.0	2.6
Rae Burrell	3	1	14.7	.111	.167	1.000	1.0	0.3	0.7	0.0	1.7
Jasmine Walker	32	1	8.8	.250	.200	1.000	1.5	0.2	0.2	0.1	1.6
Amy Atwell^{‡}	4	1	8.0	.111	.167	.000	0.5	0.5	0.0	0.0	0.8

^{‡}Waived/Released during the season
^{†}Traded during the season
^{≠}Acquired during the season

== Awards and honors ==
Recipient	Award	Date awarded	Ref.
Nneka Ogwumike	WNBA All-Star Starter	June 22	
Nneka Ogwumike	Western Conference Player of the Week	June 27	
Nneka Ogwumike	All-WNBA Second Team	September 15	
Brittney Sykes	All-Defensive Second Team	August 30	
