= 2022 Las Vegas Aces season =

26th season in the Women's National Basketball Association

- WNBA champions
- Head coach: Becky Hammon
- Arena: Michelob Ultra Arena

Results
- Record: 26–10 (.722)
- Place: 1st (Western)
- Playoff finish: WNBA Champions (Defeated Connecticut Sun 3–1 in WNBA Finals)

The 2022 Las Vegas Aces season was the franchise's 26th season in the Women's National Basketball Association and the 5th year the franchise is based in Las Vegas after relocating from San Antonio and Utah. The regular season began on May 6, 2022, at the Phoenix Mercury.

On December 31, 2021, the Aces named former WNBA great and San Antonio Spurs assistant coach Becky Hammon as their new head coach.

The Aces started the season under Hammon in strong fashion, winning their first two games before losing a game. The team then went on a seven game winning streak to end May 9–1. The winning streak ended on the first of June, but the Aces then won their next four straight games. The end of June was not as kind to the team, as they lost three of their last four games, to finish the month 5–4. July got off to a rocky start, with the team losing two of its first three games, but then they won three of their next four before finishing the month on a four game winning streak. The winning streak would be five including the Commissioner's Cup Final. The Aces beat the Chicago Sky 93–83 to win their first Commissioner's Cup. Excluding that cup, the team finished July 8–3, and secured a berth into the 2022 WNBA Playoffs on July 24. They started the final month of the season on a two game losing streak, but won their last four games to finish the month 4–2 and secure the first seed in the playoffs. Their win in the penultimate game of the season gave them the better head-to-head record with Chicago and secured the tiebreaker for the top seed. Their final record of 26–10 in the regular season, was the highest win total in franchise history and their winning percentage of .722 was the second highest.

As the first seed in the playoffs, they had home court advantage against the eight seed Phoenix Mercury in the first round. The Aces won the first game 79–63 and cruise to a game two victory 117–80 to win the series two games to zero. In the second round they faced off against the fourth seeded Seattle Storm. Las Vegas lost the first game at home 73–76. However, they won game two 78–73 to send the series to Seattle tied. The Aces prevailed in over time in game three of the series and also won game four in Seattle to take the series three games to one. The Aces would again have home court advantage in the WNBA Finals where they matched up against the third seed Connecticut Sun. Las Vegas won the first two games at home 67–64 and 85–71 respectively. The Aces lost game three in Connecticut 76–105. However, they came back and won game four to win the series three games to one and finish as WNBA Champions. This was the first championship in franchise history. This also marked the first time a team won both the WNBA Commissioner's Cup and the WNBA Finals.

During the postseason, A'ja Wilson was named MVP, Jackie Young won Most Improved Player, Chelsea Gray was Finals MVP, and Coach Becky Hammon was named Coach of the Year in her first season.

== Transactions ==
=== WNBA draft ===
Round	Pick	Player	Nationality	School/team/country
1	8	Mya Hollingshed	Puerto Rico	Colorado
1	11	Kierstan Bell	United States	Florida Gulf Coast
2	13	Khayla Pointer	United States	LSU
2	23	Aisha Sheppard	United States	Virginia Tech
3	35	Faustine Aifuwa	United States	LSU

=== Trades and Roster Changes ===
Date	Details
December 31, 2021	Hired Becky Hammon as head coach
January 7, 2022	Extended Qualifying Offers to A'ja Wilson and Ji-Su Park
January 15, 2022	Renounced the rights to Clarissa dos Santos
February 2, 2022	Re-Signed A'ja Wilson to a Two-Year Deal
February 3, 2022	Re-Signed Kiah Stokes to a One-Year Deal
February 3, 2022	Re-Signed Riquna Williams to a Two-Year Deal
February 15, 2022	Signed Kalani Brown to a training-camp contract
February 24, 2022	Hired Natalie Nakase as an Assistant coach
March 2, 2022	Signed Sydney Colson to a training-camp contract
March 3, 2022	Signed Theresa Plaisance to a training-camp contract
March 14, 2022	Hired Tyler Marsh as an Assistant coach
April 8, 2022	Waived Destiny Slocum
April 8, 2022	Hired Natalie Williams as General Manager
April 10, 2022	Traded a First and Second Round pick in the 2023 WNBA Draft to the Minnesota Lynx in exchange for the #8 and #13 Picks in the 2022 WNBA draft
April 13, 2022	Signed Kierstan Bell, Aisha Sheppard, Faustine Aifuwa, and Mya Hollingshed to rookie-scale contracts
April 13, 2022	Signed Deja Winters to a training-camp contract
April 16, 2022	Signed Khayla Pointer to a rookie-scale contract
April 16, 2022	Signed Nancy Mulkey to a training-camp contract
April 16, 2022	Hired Charlene Thomas-Swinson as assistant coach
April 18, 2022	Waived Kalani Brown
April 19, 2022	Waived Faustine Aifuwa and Deja Winters
May 2, 2022	Waived Mya Hollingshed, Khayla Pointer, and Nancy Mulkey
May 3, 2022	Signed Victoria Macaulay to a training-camp contract
May 5, 2022	Waived Victoria Macaulay
May 5, 2022	Temporarily Suspend Kiah Stokes due to Overseas Commitments
May 16, 2022	Signed Jackie Young to a contract extension
May 17, 2022	Activated Kiah Stokes from her Temporary Suspension
May 23, 2022	Signed Chelsea Gray to a Contract Extension
June 19, 2022	Signed Iliana Rupert to a rookie-scale contract
June 29, 2022	Signed Dearica Hamby to a Contract Extension
July 17, 2022	Signed Kelsey Plum to a 2-Year Contract Extension

== Roster ==
2022 Las Vegas Aces roster
Players
Coaches

Pos.	No.	Nat.	Name	Height	Weight	DOB	From	Yrs
F	1	(United States)	Bell, Kierstan	6' 1" (1.85m)	176 lb (80kg)	2000-03-16	Florida Gulf Coast	R
G	51	(United States)	Colson, Sydney	5' 8" (1.73m)	140 lb (64kg)	1989-08-06	Texas A&M	7
G	12	(United States)	Gray, Chelsea	5' 11" (1.8m)	170 lb (77kg)	1992-10-08	Duke	7
F	5	(United States)	Hamby, Dearica	6' 3" (1.91m)	189 lb (86kg)	1993-11-06	Wake Forest	7
F	55	(United States)	Plaisance, Theresa	6' 5" (1.96m)	200 lb (91kg)	1992-05-18	LSU	8
G	10	(United States)	Plum, Kelsey	5' 8" (1.73m)	145 lb (66kg)	1994-08-24	Washington	4
C	21	(France)	Rupert, Iliana	6' 4" (1.93m)	189 lb (86kg)	2001-07-12	France	R
G	4	(United States)	Sheppard, Aisha	5' 9" (1.75m)	145 lb (66kg)	1993-03-30	Virginia Tech	R
C	41	(United States)	Stokes, Kiah	6' 3" (1.91m)	191 lb (87kg)	1993-03-30	Connecticut	6
G	2	(United States)	Williams, Riquna	5' 6" (1.68m)	165 lb (75kg)	1990-05-28	Miami (FL)	9
F	22	(United States)	Wilson, A'ja	6' 4" (1.93m)	195 lb (88kg)	1996-08-08	South Carolina	4
G	0	(United States)	Young, Jackie	6' 0" (1.83m)	165 lb (75kg)	1997-09-16	Notre Dame	3

Head coach
(United States) Becky Hammon (Colorado State)
Assistant coaches
(United States) Natalie Nakase (UCLA)
(United States) Tyler Marsh (Birmingham–Southern)
(United States) Charlene Thomas-Swinson (Auburn)
Athletic trainer
(United States) Michelle Anumba (Duke)

Legend

- (C) Team captain
- (DP) Unsigned draft pick
- (FA) Free agent
- (S) Suspended
- Injured

=== Depth ===
Pos.	Starter	Bench
C	Kiah Stokes	Iliana Rupert
PF	A'ja Wilson	Dearica Hamby; Theresa Plaisance
SF	Jackie Young	Kierstan Bell
SG	Kelsey Plum	Riquna Williams; Aisha Sheppard
PG	Chelsea Gray	Sydney Colson

== Schedule ==
=== Preseason ===
2022 pre-season game log
May: 0–1 (Home: 0–0; Road: 0–1)

Game	Date	Team	Score	High points	High rebounds	High assists	Location Attendance	Record
1	May 1	@ Minnesota	L 86–89	Kelsey Plum (16)	A'ja Wilson (7)	Kelsey Plum (5)	Target Center; N/A	0–1

2022 pre-season schedule

=== Regular season ===
2022 game log
Total: 26–10 (Home: 13–5; Road: 13–5)
May: 9–1 (Home: 6–0; Road: 3–1)

Game	Date	Team	Score	High points	High rebounds	High assists	Location Attendance	Record
1	May 6	@ Phoenix	W 106–88	Dearica Hamby (24)	A'ja Wilson (11)	Kelsey Plum (7)	Footprint Center; 7,167	1–0
2	May 8	Seattle	W 85–74	A'ja Wilson (20)	Dearica Hamby (19)	Kelsey Plum (7)	Michelob Ultra Arena; 6,212	2–0
3	May 10	@ Washington	L 76–89	Jackie Young (19)	A'ja Wilson (11)	Chelsea Gray (5)	Entertainment and Sports Arena; 3,082	2–1
4	May 13	@ Atlanta	W 96–73	A'ja Wilson (15)	Dearica Hamby (13)	Kelsey Plum (11)	Gateway Center Arena; 3,138	3–1
5	May 17	Phoenix	W 86–74	Kelsey Plum (20)	A'ja Wilson (10)	Chelsea Gray (9)	Michelob Ultra Arena; 2,536	4–1
6	May 19	Minnesota	W 93–87	Jackie Young (25)	Dearica Hamby (12)	Chelsea Gray (7)	Michelob Ultra Arena; 3,640	5–1
7	May 21	Phoenix	W 100–80	Kelsey Plum (24)	Theresa Plaisance (9)	Gray; Young (5)	Michelob Ultra Arena; 5,572	6–1
8	May 23	Los Angeles	W 104–76	A'ja Wilson (24)	Jackie Young (9)	Kelsey Plum (8)	Michelob Ultra Arena; 4,092	7–1
9	May 28	@ Chicago	W 83–76	A'ja Wilson (22)	A'ja Wilson (16)	Gray; Plum; Young (6)	Wintrust Arena; 6,812	8–1
10	May 31	Connecticut	W 89–81	A'ja Wilson (24)	A'ja Wilson (14)	Kelsey Plum (7)	Michelob Ultra Arena; 4,693	9–1

June : 5–4 (Home: 2–3; Road: 3–1)

Game	Date	Team	Score	High points	High rebounds	High assists	Location Attendance	Record
11	June 2	Connecticut	L 90–97	Jackie Young (26)	Hamby; Wilson (7)	Kelsey Plum (8)	Michelob Ultra Arena; 3,801	9–2
12	June 5	Dallas	W 84–78	Kelsey Plum (32)	Dearica Hamby (8)	Hamby; Plum (5)	Michelob Ultra Arena; 4,814	10–2
13	June 11	@ Los Angeles	W 89–72	A'ja Wilson (35)	A'ja Wilson (11)	Kelsey Plum (8)	Crypto.com Arena; 8,200	11–2
14	June 15	@ Dallas	W 92–84	Kelsey Plum (27)	Dearica Hamby (12)	Chelsea Gray (8)	College Park Center; 4,375	12–2
15	June 19	Minnesota	W 96–95	A'ja Wilson (25)	A'ja Wilson (8)	Chelsea Gray (8)	Michelob Ultra Arena; 4,603	13–2
16	June 21	Chicago	L 95–104	Jackie Young (23)	A'ja Wilson (11)	Gray; Plum (7)	Michelob Ultra Arena; 4,951	13–3
17	June 25	Washington	L 86–87 (OT)	Plum; Young (20)	A'ja Wilson (14)	Chelsea Gray (6)	Michelob Ultra Arena; 7,171	13–4
18	June 27	@ Los Angeles	W 79–73	Kelsey Plum (29)	A'ja Wilson (11)	Jackie Young (7)	Crypto.com Arena; 4,200	14–4
19	June 29	@ Seattle	L 78–88	A'ja Wilson (17)	A'ja Wilson (16)	Chelsea Gray (8)	Climate Pledge Arena; 9,499	14–5

July : 8–3 (Home: 2–2; Road: 6–1)

Game	Date	Team	Score	High points	High rebounds	High assists	Location Attendance	Record
20	July 1	@ Minnesota	W 91–85	Chelsea Gray (21)	A'ja Wilson (12)	Kelsey Plum (10)	Target Center; 6,104	15–5
21	July 3	@ Minnesota	L 71–102	Kelsey Plum (12)	A'ja Wilson (7)	Kelsey Plum (5)	Target Center; 7,603	15–6
22	July 6	New York	L 107–116	A'ja Wilson (29)	A'ja Wilson (9)	Chelsea Gray (6)	Michelob Ultra Arena; 8,405	15–7
23	July 12	@ New York	W 107–101	Kelsey Plum (27)	A'ja Wilson (14)	Jackie Young (7)	Barclays Center; 5,201	16–7
24	July 14	@ New York	W 108–74	A'ja Wilson (25)	Dearica Hamby (7)	Jackie Young (9)	Barclays Center; 9,896	17–7
25	July 17	@ Connecticut	W 91–83	Kelsey Plum (22)	Hamby; Wilson (7)	Chelsea Gray (9)	Mohegan Sun Arena; 6,814	18–7
26	July 19	Atlanta	L 76–92	A'ja Wilson (22)	A'ja Wilson (10)	Kelsey Plum (7)	Michelob Ultra Arena; 5,952	18–8
27	July 21	Indiana	W 90–77	A'ja Wilson (23)	Dearica Hamby (9)	Chelsea Gray (12)	Michelob Ultra Arena; 5,737	19–8
28	July 23	Los Angeles	W 84–66	Kelsey Plum (29)	Jackie Young (9)	Jackie Young (6)	Michelob Ultra Arena; 7,522	20–8
CC Final	July 26	@ Chicago	W 93–83	Kelsey Plum (24)	A'ja Wilson (17)	Kelsey Plum (6)	Wintrust Arena; 8,922	N/A
29	July 29	@ Indiana	W 93–72	Plum; Wilson (22)	Jackie Young (7)	Gray; Young (5)	Hinkle Fieldhouse; 1,828	21–8
30	July 31	@ Indiana	W 94–69	Kelsey Plum (26)	Kiah Stokes (10)	Chelsea Gray (7)	Hinkle Fieldhouse; 1,822	22–8

August : 4–2 (Home: 3–0; Road: 1–2)

Game	Date	Team	Score	High points	High rebounds	High assists	Location Attendance	Record
31	August 2	@ Washington	L 73–83	A'ja Wilson (22)	A'ja Wilson (12)	Kelsey Plum (5)	Entertainment and Sports Arena; 4,200	22–9
32	August 4	@ Dallas	L 80–82	Chelsea Gray (28)	A'ja Wilson (9)	Kelsey Plum (7)	College Park Center; 3,492	22–10
33	August 7	@ Seattle	W 89–81	A'ja Wilson (29)	Kiah Stokes (9)	Chelsea Gray (9)	Climate Pledge Arena; 18,100	23–10
34	August 9	Atlanta	W 97–90	A'ja Wilson (24)	A'ja Wilson (14)	Kelsey Plum (8)	Michelob Ultra Arena; 5,151	24–10
35	August 11	Chicago	W 89–78	Kelsey Plum (25)	Kiah Stokes (7)	Kelsey Plum (5)	Michelob Ultra Arena; 6,055	25–10
36	August 14	Seattle	W 109–100	Chelsea Gray (33)	A'ja Wilson (10)	Chelsea Gray (9)	Michelob Ultra Arena; 10,015	26–10

2022 season schedule

=== Playoffs ===
2022 playoff game log
First Round vs. Phoenix Mercury
Won Series: 2–0

Game	Date	Team	Score	High points	High rebounds	High assists	Location Attendance	Series
1	August 17	Phoenix	W 79–63	Kelsey Plum (22)	Kiah Stokes (13)	Gray; Plum (4)	Michelob Ultra Arena; 8,725	1–0
2	August 20	Phoenix	W 117–80	Chelsea Gray (27)	Riquna Williams (5)	Chelsea Gray (8)	Michelob Ultra Arena; 9,126	2–0

Second Round vs. Seattle Storm
Won Series: 3–1

Game	Date	Team	Score	High points	High rebounds	High assists	Location Attendance	Series
1	August 28	Seattle	L 73–76	Chelsea Gray (21)	A'ja Wilson (12)	Gray; Young (5)	Michelob Ultra Arena; 9,944	0–1
2	August 31	Seattle	W 78–73	A'ja Wilson (33)	A'ja Wilson (13)	Chelsea Gray (7)	Michelob Ultra Arena; 9,755	1–1
3	September 4	@ Seattle	W 110–98 (OT)	A'ja Wilson (34)	Kiah Stokes (12)	Chelsea Gray (12)	Climate Pledge Arena; 15,431	2–1
4	September 6	@ Seattle	W 97–92	Chelsea Gray (31)	A'ja Wilson (13)	Chelsea Gray (10)	Climate Pledge Arena; 11,328	3–1

Finals vs. Connecticut Sun
Won Series: 3–1

Game	Date	Team	Score	High points	High rebounds	High assists	Location Attendance	Series
1	September 11	Connecticut	W 67–64	A'ja Wilson (24)	A'ja Wilson (11)	Chelsea Gray (3)	Michelob Ultra Arena; 10,135	1–0
2	September 13	Connecticut	W 85–71	A'ja Wilson (26)	A'ja Wilson (10)	Chelsea Gray (8)	Michelob Ultra Arena; 10,211	2–0
3	September 15	@ Connecticut	L 76–105	Jackie Young (22)	Kiah Stokes (7)	Chelsea Gray (7)	Mohegan Sun Arena; 8,745	2–1
4	September 18	@ Connecticut	W 78–71	Chelsea Gray (20)	A'ja Wilson (14)	Jackie Young (8)	Mohegan Sun Arena; 9,652	3–1

2022 playoff schedule

== Standings ==
#	Team	W	L	PCT	GB	Conf.	Home	Road	Cup
1	x – Las Vegas Aces	26	10	.722	–	15–3	13–5	13–5	9–1
2	x – Chicago Sky	26	10	.722	–	15–3	14–4	12–6	9–1
3	x – Connecticut Sun	25	11	.694	1.0	11–7	13–5	12–6	5–5
4	x – Seattle Storm	22	14	.611	4.0	10–8	13–5	9–9	6–4
5	x – Washington Mystics	22	14	.611	4.0	11–7	12–6	10–8	5–5
6	x – Dallas Wings	18	18	.500	8.0	8–10	8–10	10–8	5–5
7	x – New York Liberty	16	20	.444	10.0	10–8	9–9	7–11	6–4
8	x – Phoenix Mercury	15	21	.417	11.0	7–11	11–7	4–14	3–7
9	e – Minnesota Lynx	14	22	.389	12.0	8–10	7–11	7–11	4–6
10	e – Atlanta Dream	14	22	.389	12.0	5–13	8–10	6–12	3–7
11	e – Los Angeles Sparks	13	23	.361	13.0	6–12	7–11	6–12	3–7
12	e – Indiana Fever	5	31	.139	21.0	2–16	3–15	2–16	2–8

Notes

(#) – League Standing
x – Clinched playoff berth
e – Eliminated from playoff contention
Source: Overall standings and Commissioner's Cup Standings

== Playoffs ==
**First round** Best-of-3
**1**	**Las Vegas Aces**	**2**
8	Phoenix Mercury	0
**4**	**Seattle Storm**	**2**
5	Washington Mystics	0
**2**	**Chicago Sky**	**2**
7	New York Liberty	1
**3**	**Connecticut Sun**	**2**
6	Dallas Wings	1

**Semifinals**; Best-of-5
**1**	**Las Vegas Aces**	**3**
4	Seattle Storm	1
2	Chicago Sky	2
**3**	**Connecticut Sun**	**3**

**Finals**; Best-of-5
**1**	**Las Vegas Aces**	**3**
3	Connecticut Sun	1

- **Bold** – Series winner
- Italic – Team with home-court advantage

== Statistics ==
Legend
GP	Games played	GS	Games started	MPG	Minutes per game	RPG	Rebounds per game
APG	Assists per game	SPG	Steals per game	BPG	Blocks per game	PPG	Points per game
FG%	Field-goal percentage	3P%	3-point field-goal percentage	FT%	Free-throw percentage	TO	Turnovers per game
PF	Fouls per game		Team leader		League leader

=== Regular season ===
Player	GP	GS	MPG	FG%	3P%	FT%	RPG	APG	SPG	BPG	PPG
Kelsey Plum	36	36	32.8	.460	.420	.839	2.7	5.1	1.0	0.1	20.2
A'ja Wilson	36	36	30.0	.501	.373	.813	9.4	2.1	1.4	1.9	19.5
Jackie Young	34	34	33.2	.476	.431	.859	4.4	3.9	1.4	0.2	15.9
Chelsea Gray	35	35	29.7	.491	.340	.910	3.2	6.1	1.6	0.3	13.7
Dearica Hamby	34	32	26.5	.466	.219	.720	7.1	1.1	1.1	0.1	9.3
Riquna Williams	21	0	18.0	.381	.366	.762	2.0	1.2	0.4	0.1	6.7
Theresa Plaisance	31	2	12.9	.371	.348	.700	2.6	0.5	0.3	0.4	4.0
Iliana Rupert^{≠}	17	0	13.1	.463	.368	.333	2.3	0.9	0.4	0.0	3.8
Kiah Stokes	31	4	15.3	.426	.208	.813	4.4	0.6	0.5	0.8	2.3
Sydney Colson	18	0	6.8	.313	.273	1.000	0.4	1.0	0.1	0.0	1.6
Aisha Sheppard	23	0	7.6	.238	.273	.750	0.6	0.3	0.2	0.0	1.5
Kierstan Bell	21	1	5.8	.303	.136	1.000	0.9	0.3	0.1	0.1	1.3

^{‡}Waived/Released during the season
^{†}Traded during the season
^{≠}Acquired during the season

=== Playoffs ===
Player	GP	GS	MPG	FG%	3P%	FT%	RPG	APG	SPG	BPG	PPG
Chelsea Gray	10	10	34.0	.611	.544	.833	3.8	7.0	1.2	0.6	21.7
A'ja Wilson	10	10	37.2	.552	.143	.791	10.4	2.0	1.0	2.4	20.3
Kelsey Plum	10	10	33.3	.409	.286	.891	3.9	3.8	0.9	0.0	17.1
Jackie Young	10	10	34.5	.432	.474	.926	4.1	3.0	0.8	0.1	12.5
Riquna Williams	10	0	20.3	.348	.358	1.00	2.7	1.0	0.8	0.2	6.9
Kiah Stokes	10	10	25.9	.486	.200	1.00	7.2	0.4	0.6	0.8	3.7
Kierstan Bell	4	0	4.8	.667	.600	0.00	1.3	0.3	0.0	0.0	2.8
Iliana Rupert	7	0	7.0	.313	.357	0.00	0.4	0.0	0.0	0.1	2.1
Theresa Plaisance	4	0	5.0	.400	.333	0.00	1.3	0.5	0.3	0.5	1.3
Dearica Hamby	6	0	8.5	.600	0.00	0.25	1.5	0.8	0.2	0.2	1.2
Sydney Colson	4	0	4.8	0.00	0.00	0.00	1.0	1.0	0.0	0.0	0.0
Aisha Sheppard	4	0	4.0	0.00	0.00	0.00	0.0	0.8	0.0	0.0	0.0

== Awards and honors ==
Recipient	Award	Date awarded	Ref.
A'ja Wilson	Western Conference Player of the Week	May 16	
A'ja Wilson	Western Conference Player of the Week	May 31	
A'ja Wilson	Western Conference Player of the Week	June 21	
A'ja Wilson	Western Conference Player of the Week	July 25	
A'ja Wilson	Western Conference Player of the Week	August 15	
A'ja Wilson	Western Conference Player of the Month - May	June 1	
A'ja Wilson	Western Conference Player of the Month - July	August 2	
A'ja Wilson	WNBA All-Star Starter & Co-Captain	June 22	
A'ja Wilson	WNBA Defensive Player of the Year	August 30	
A'ja Wilson	All-Defensive First Team	August 30	
A'ja Wilson	WNBA MVP	September 7	
A'ja Wilson	All-WNBA First Team	September 15	
Jackie Young	Western Conference Player of the Week	May 23	
Jackie Young	WNBA All-Star Starter	June 22	
Jackie Young	WNBA Most Improved Player	August 29	
Kelsey Plum	Western Conference Player of the Week	June 6	
Kelsey Plum	Western Conference Player of the Week	August 1	
Kelsey Plum	WNBA All-Star Starter	June 22	
Kelsey Plum	All-Star Game MVP	July 10	
Kelsey Plum	All-WNBA First Team	September 15	
Dearica Hamby	WNBA All-Star Selection	June 28	
Chelsea Gray	Commissioner's Cup Final MVP	July 26	
Chelsea Gray	WNBA Finals MVP	September 18	
Becky Hammon	WNBA Coach of the Month - May	June 1	
Becky Hammon	WNBA Coach of the Year	August 26	
