= Sydney Colson =

American basketball player (born 1989)

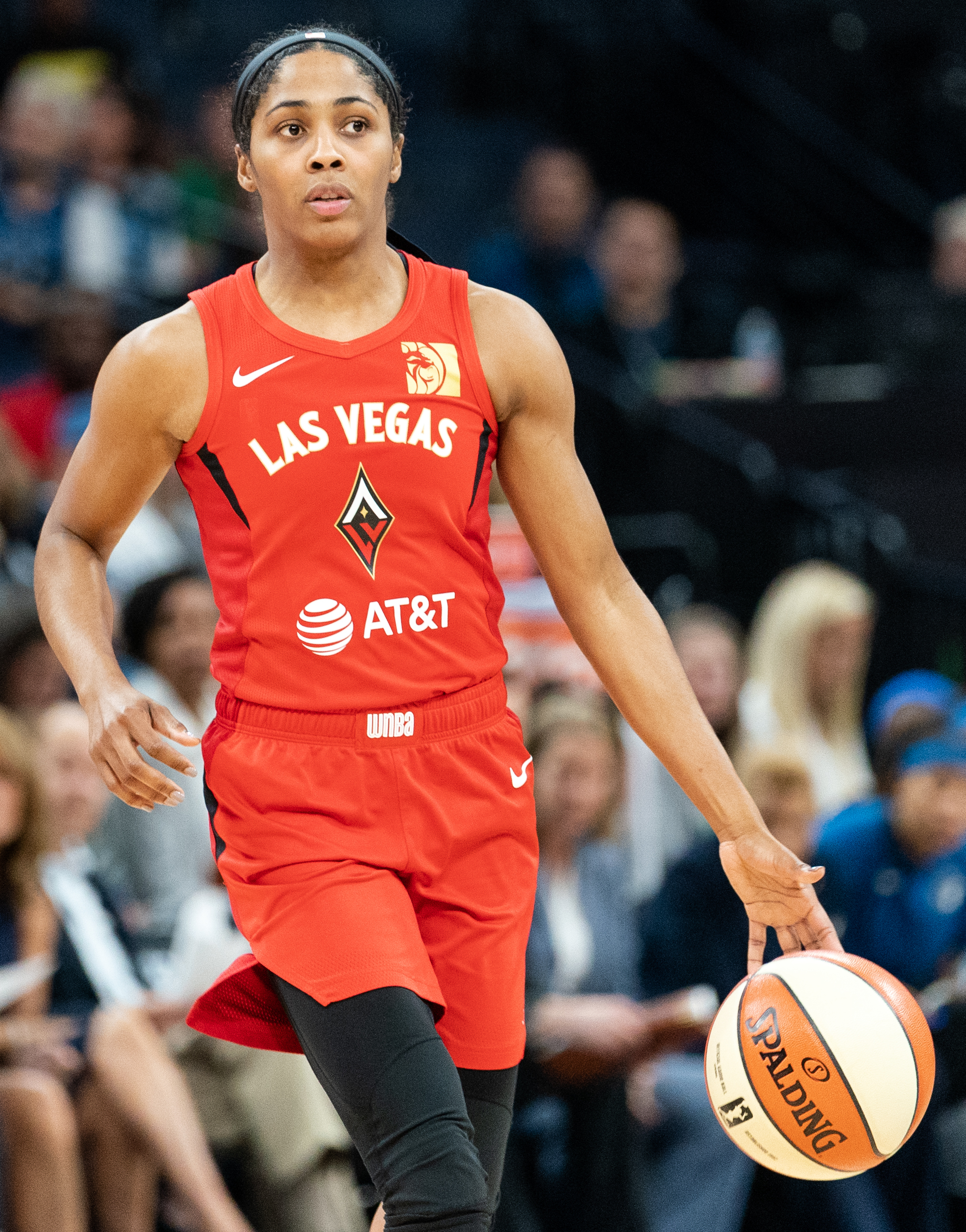
- Colson with the Las Vegas Aces in 2019

Personal information
- Born: August 6, 1989 (age 37) Houston, Texas, U.S.
- Listed height: 5 ft 8 in (1.73 m)
- Listed weight: 137 lb (62 kg)

Career information
- High school: Westside (Houston, Texas)
- College: Texas A&M (2007–2011)
- WNBA draft: 2011: 2nd round, 16th overall pick
- Drafted by: Connecticut Sun
- Playing career: 2011-2013, 2015––2025
- Position: Point guard

Career history
- 2011: New York Liberty
- 2011-2013: Lider Pruszkow
- 2015–2017: San Antonio Stars
- 2017-2018: Hapoel Rishon LeZion
- 2018: Minnesota Lynx
- 2018-2019: Ślęza Wrocław
- 2019: Las Vegas Aces
- 2020: Chicago Sky
- 2021–present: Athletes Unlimited
- 2022–2024: Las Vegas Aces
- 2025: Indiana Fever

Career highlights
- As player: 2× WNBA champion (2022, 2023); 2× WNBA Commissioner’s Cup champion (2022, 2025); NCAA champion (2011); As coach: WBI Championship (2017)
- Stats at WNBA.com
- Stats at Basketball Reference

Sydney Justine Colson (born August 6, 1989) is an American former professional basketball player for the Women's National Basketball Association (WNBA) and Athletes Unlimited Pro Basketball and comedian. She played college basketball at Texas A&M University, where she helped the Aggies win the 2011 NCAA title. She played for the New York Liberty, San Antonio Stars, Minnesota Lynx, Chicago Sky, Las Vegas Aces, and the Indiana Fever in the WNBA, and overseas in Poland and Israel. Colson is a two-time WNBA champion, winning back-to-back titles with the Aces in 2022 and 2023.

== Early life ==
Colson was born in Houston, Texas, to Simmie and Stephanie Colson. She grew up watching the WNBA's Houston Comets, who began play in 1997, when Colson was in elementary school.

She attended Westside High School, where she was a National Honor Society member. During her sophomore year in 2005, she was named 5A All-District First Team and All-Greater Houston Second Team selection. As a junior, Colson earned All-Greater Houston honors, averaging 16.2 points and 4.2 assists per game. A heavily recruited prospect, Colson was rated the 29th overall prospect and the no. 8 point guard in the Class of 2007.

Recruited by future Naismith Memorial Basketball Hall of Fame coach Gary Blair, Colson committed to Texas A&M University over offers from LSU and Oklahoma.

== College career ==
Colson was a four-year letter winner for the Aggies between 2008 and 2011, and is tied for being the winningest player in program history. She majored in sociology.

Colson spent her freshman season as a reserve on the first Texas A&M team to reach the Elite Eight in program history, backing up point guard A'Quonesia Franklin. She played in all 37 games that season, with two starts against Indiana and Stephen F. Austin, and was one of just three Aggies to see action in every game that year.

As a sophomore, Colson tore her ACL during a pickup basketball game in June 2008 after working as a counselor at a Texas A&M basketball camp. Colson successfully rehabilitated the injury, returning to play eight minutes in the Aggies' season opener on November 14, 2008, against Mercer, 128 days after undergoing surgery to repair the torn ligament.

During her junior season, Colson captained the Aggies to a Big 12 Tournament Championship in 2010.

During the 2010–11 season, the pairing of Colson and junior co-captain Sydney Carter, known as "the two Sydneys", played an essential role in the Aggies' 2011 NCAA tournament run. On March 30, 2011, In the regional finals against first-seeded Baylor and future WNBA star Brittney Griner, Colson had 12 points, 5 steals, and 4 assists, as A&M ended an eight-game losing streak to Baylor 58–46 at American Airlines Arena to advance to the program's first Final Four berth. In the national semifinals, with 3.3 seconds left in the game, Colson dished the game-winning assist to Tyra White to defeat first-seeded Stanford 63–62 to advance to the finals against Notre Dame. During the championship final at Conseco Fieldhouse in Indianapolis, Colson recorded 10 points, 5 assists and 3 steals in A&M's 76–70 win over Notre Dame, helping Texas A&M capture its first national championship.

== Professional career ==
=== New York Liberty (2011) ===
Colson was selected in the second round of the 2011 WNBA draft (16th overall) by the Connecticut Sun, and was traded on draft night to the New York Liberty for Kalana Greene.

During her rookie season in New York, Colson played sparingly in sixteen games, but shot 42.9 percent from three-point range. On May 16, 2012, Colson was waived by the Liberty during the WNBA preseason.

=== Lider Pruszkow (2011–2013) ===
After being cut by the Liberty, Colson spent the 2011–12 and 2012–13 seasons playing overseas in Poland for Lider Pruszkow in the Polska Liga Koszykówki Kobiet. During the 2011–12 season, she scored in double figures on 12 occasions, including a season-high 21 points against BI SSA Gdynia on January 22. The next year, Colson scored in double figures in 11 of the 21 games she played in the 2012–13 season, helping Lider Pruskow advance to the Polish Cup Semifinals.

=== San Antonio Stars (2015–2017) ===
After several seasons out of the WNBA, Colson signed a training camp contract with the San Antonio Stars on May 15, 2015, shortly after joining Rice University as an assistant coach. Over the next three seasons, Colson played 96 games with the Stars, averaging 3.9 points and 2.5 assists as a reserve.

=== Minnesota Lynx (2018) ===
Colson signed with the Minnesota Lynx on August 14, 2018, with three games left in the regular season. In her Lynx debut on August 14, 2018, Colson tallied three points, two rebounds, two assists and a block in five-plus minutes of play against the Chicago Sky.

=== Hapoel Rishon LeZion (2017–2018) ===
During the 2017–18 season, Colson played overseas in Israel for Hapoel Rishon LeZion in the Ligat Ha'al. She played 21 games, scoring 20 or more points on eight occasions, including a season-high 25 points against Bnot Hertzeliya on December 7, 2017. At the end of the season, Colson was named All-Israeli League Honorable Mention by Eurobasket.com.

=== Ślęza Wrocław (2018–2019) ===
Colson returned to Poland for the 2018–19 season, playing 35 games for Ślęza Wrocław. She helped the team advance to the Polish Basket Liga Kobiet semifinals.

=== Las Vegas Aces (2019) ===
On May 13, 2019, Colson signed a nonguaranteed contract with the Las Vegas Aces, marking her return to the former Stars franchise after the team's rebranding and move to Las Vegas. After playing with the Aces in their only preseason game against the Lynx on May 19, Colson was informed by then-head coach Bill Laimbeer that she would be cut. Laimbeer changed his mind "an hour later" and retained Colson on the roster with the Aces' final roster spot, instead waiving Jaime Nared and buying out the contract of Kelsey Bone.

Colson played in 33 games during the 2019 season, averaging 3.3 points and 1.8 assists while shooting 45% from the free throw line. On July 13, 2019, Colson scored a WNBA career-high 17 points against the Washington Mystics.

During a single-elimination game in the second round of the 2019 WNBA playoffs against the Chicago Sky, Colson's defense played a key role in what became known as the "Hamby Heave". With 12.5 seconds left on the clock, Colson rushed Chicago guard Courtney Vandersloot in an effort to foul her, leading Vandersloot to attempt a jump pass to Diamond DeShields, which was subsequently stolen by Aces teammate Dearica Hamby. With 5.3 seconds remaining, Hamby scored a game-winning three-pointer from half-court, sending the Aces onto the semifinals.

=== Chicago Sky (2020) ===
On February 13, 2020, Colson was signed by the Chicago Sky. In June 2020, Colson tested positive for COVID-19, missing the beginning of the abbreviated 2020 WNBA season. After recovering from her bout with coronavirus, Colson joined the Sky in July 2020 in the Wubble at IMG Academy in Bradenton, Florida.

=== Athletes Unlimited (2021–present) ===
During the 2021-22 WNBA offseason, Colson played in Las Vegas with Athletes Unlimited during the development league's inaugural season, serving on player executive committee. In October 2022, it was announced that Colson would rejoin Athletes Unlimited for the 2023 season.

In 2026, Colson joined Athletes Unlimited Pro Basketball's broadcast team in an on-air role during the league's fifth season in Nashville.

=== Las Vegas Aces (2022–2024) ===
On March 2, 2022, Colson signed with the Las Vegas Aces as a free agent. Colson's return to the Aces marked her third stint with the franchise, in part on the strength of her performance during the 2021 Athletes Unlimited season. She played in 18 games during the 2022 WNBA season, during which the Aces won both the second-ever WNBA Commissioner's Cup and the 2022 WNBA Finals, felling the Connecticut Sun 3–1 in four games.

Colson re-signed with Las Vegas for the 2023 WNBA season on February 7, 2023. In 28 appearances, Colson averaged 4.8 minutes a game coming off the Aces' bench, almost entirely in garbage time. In Game 4 of the 2023 WNBA Finals against the New York Liberty, after injuries sidelined starters Chelsea Gray and Kiah Stokes, Colson's defense played a key role in the Aces' 70–69 victory. During post-game interviews, Colson took the mic from ESPN reporter Holly Rowe to say "Night, night!", using Stephen Curry's sleeping celebration in a moment that went viral.

=== Indiana Fever (2025–present) ===
On February 5, 2025, Colson signed a one-year deal with the Indiana Fever. Initially signed as a relief point guard that also brought veteran experience to the relatively young Fever squad, Colson became a significant piece in the Fever's lineup during the absences and following the season-ending-injury of the Fever's primary point guard Caitlin Clark.

During the first quarter of the Fever's August 7 game at Phoenix, Colson was helped to the locker room after a non-contact injury to her left leg. The following day, the Fever announced Colson had sustained a season-ending injury with a left ACL tear. This would be one of two season-ending-injuries sustained by the Fever during this game, as Aari McDonald, the Fever's other point guard, later exited the game with a broken right foot.

== Coaching career ==
After playing overseas in Poland, Colson returned to her alma mater Texas A&M in January 2014 as a graduate assistant, reuniting with her college coach Gary Blair. During her first season as a graduate assistant, the Aggies made a run to the Elite Eight before falling 69–54 to no. 1 seed and eventual champions UConn. She served as video coordinator for the 2014-15 season.

On May 4, 2015, Colson was hired as an assistant coach for the Rice University Owls, joining head coach Tina Langley. Colson joined Langley's coaching staff with the stipulation that she would have permission to pursue opportunities to play professionally. Eleven days after joining the Rice staff, Colson signed with the San Antonio Stars.

While playing for the Stars, Colson spent the 2015–16 and 2016-17 offseasons as an assistant coach at Rice, with the Owls improving by 13 wins between her first to her second season. In 2017, Rice won the Women's Basketball Invitational for the first time ever, defeating UNC Greensboro 74–62.

== Career statistics ==
Legend
GP	Games played	GS	Games started	MPG	Minutes per game	RPG	Rebounds per game
APG	Assists per game	SPG	Steals per game	BPG	Blocks per game	PPG	Points per game
TO	Turnovers per game	FG%	Field-goal percentage	3P%	3-point field-goal percentage	FT%	Free-throw percentage
**Bold**	Career best	°	League leader

†	Denotes season(s) in which Colson won a WNBA championship
*	Denotes season(s) in which Colson won an NCAA Championship

=== WNBA ===
==== Regular season ====
Stats current through end of 2025 season

WNBA regular season statistics
Year	Team	GP	GS	MPG	FG%	3P%	FT%	RPG	APG	SPG	BPG	TO	PPG
2011	New York	16	0	5.4	.350	.429	.833	0.4	0.6	0.3	0.1	1.1	1.4
2012	Did not play (waived)												
2013	Did not appear in WNBA												
2014	Did not appear in WNBA												
2015	San Antonio	**34**	5	15.9	.411	.318	.686	1.1	**2.8**	0.8	0.3	1.2	3.5
2016	San Antonio	**34**	0	**16.9**	.431	.192	.831	**1.6**	2.6	**1.1**	0.0	1.5	**5.1**
2017	San Antonio	28	4	11.6	.330	.200	.688	0.5	2.0	0.5	0.1	1.0	2.9
2018	Minnesota	2	0	8.5	.429	.000	.500	1.0	2.0	0.0	**0.5**	2.0	3.5
2019	Las Vegas	33	0	11.5	.440	**.450**	.818	0.7	1.8	0.9	0.1	0.8	3.3
2020	Chicago	17	0	6.5	.429	.333	.875	0.4	0.8	0.4	0.0	0.8	1.6
2021	Did not appear in WNBA												
2022^{†}	Las Vegas	18	0	6.8	.313	.273	**1.000**	0.4	1.0	0.1	0.0	0.4	1.6
2023^{†}	Las Vegas	28	0	4.8	**.444**	.375	.833	0.4	0.8	0.3	0.0	**0.2**	1.3
2024	Las Vegas	31	1	8.0	.422	.378	.889	0.5	1.0	0.5	0.2	0.5	2.5
2025	Indiana	30	**6**	13.5	.342	.277	.857	0.8	2.0	0.5	0.2	1.2	2.4
**Career**	11 years, 5 teams	271	16	10.9	.398	.314	.787	0.8	1.7	0.6	0.1	0.9	2.8

==== Playoffs ====
WNBA playoff statistics
Year	Team	GP	GS	MPG	FG%	3P%	FT%	RPG	APG	SPG	BPG	TO	PPG
2011	New York	1	0	2.0	—	—	—	0.0	0.0	0.0	0.0	**0.0**	0.0
2019	Las Vegas	5	0	2.8	.167	.000	**.500**	0.2	0.2	0.0	**0.2**	0.2	0.6
2020	Chicago	1	0	0.0	—	—	—	0.0	0.0	0.0	0.0	**0.0**	0.0
2022^{†}	Las Vegas	4	0	4.8	.000	.000	—	**1.0**	**1.0**	0.0	0.0	0.3	0.0
2023^{†}	Las Vegas	**7**	0	**4.9**	**.250**	.000	—	0.4	0.3	0.1	0.0	0.4	0.3
2024	Las Vegas	6	0	4.7	.143	**.167**	**.500**	0.0	0.5	**0.2**	**0.2**	0.7	**0.7**
2025	Indiana	Did not play (injury)											
**Career**	6 years, 3 teams	24	0	4.0	.143	.111	.500	0.3	0.4	0.1	0.1	0.4	0.4

=== College ===
NCAA statistics
Year	Team	GP	GS	MPG	FG%	3P%	FT%	RPG	APG	SPG	BPG	TO	PPG
2007–08	Texas A&M	35	—	10.9	.339	.218	.614	1.0	1.3	1.1	0.1	**1.5**	3.2
2008–09	Texas A&M	35	—	22.3	.389	.330	**.750**	1.3	3.0	2.1	**0.2**	2.3	6.5
2009–10	Texas A&M	30	19	20.5	**.449**	**.377**	.648	1.6	4.3	1.7	**0.2**	2.3	7.3
2010–11*	Texas A&M	**36**	**33**	**25.9**	.398	.301	.730	**2.3**	**6.1**	**2.4**	0.1	2.8	**8.0**
**Career**		138	—	52	.398	.312	.687	1.5	3.7	1.8	0.1	2.2	6.2

== Personal life ==
Colson has two siblings, Simmie IV and Simone. She is openly lesbian.

Colson began taking acting classes in January 2021. Colson is close friends with former Aces teammate Theresa Plaisance, with whom she starred in The Syd & TP Show, an unscripted buddy comedy series co-produced by Ryan Reynolds's Maximum Effort and Fubo. In July 2025, Colson and Plaisance launched a podcast, "Unsupervised" (produced by Togethxr) where they discuss basketball news as well as broader popular culture.

In September 2024, Colson debuted her signature sneaker in partnership with Creative Control, becoming the brand's first-ever signature shoe athlete and one of only three players in the WNBA to have a signature sneaker. In October 2024, Colson appeared in a TikTok ad campaign for Togethxr and Aflac alongside Aces' teammate, Kate Martin.
