= Aisha Sheppard =

American basketball player (born 1998)

Personal information
- Born: November 13, 1998 (age 28) Alexandria, Virginia, U.S.
- Listed height: 5 ft 9 in (1.75 m)

Career information
- High school: St. John's College HS (Washington, D.C.)
- College: Virginia Tech (2017–2022)
- WNBA draft: 2022: 2nd round, 23rd overall pick
- Drafted by: Las Vegas Aces
- Playing career: 2022–present
- Position: Guard
- Number: 4

Career history
- 2022: Las Vegas Aces

Career highlights
- WNBA champion (2022); Commissioner’s Cup champion (2022); 2× Sexond-team All-ACC (2020, 2022); First-team All-ACC (2021); AP All-America Honorable Mention (2021)
- Stats at Basketball Reference

Aisha Sheppard (born November 13, 1998) is an American professional basketball player. In 2022, she was drafted by and played for the Las Vegas Aces in the WNBA. She currently plays for the Spanish team Basket Zaragoza. She played college basketball at Virginia Tech.

== College career ==
Sheppard came out of high school as the Gatorade Player of the Year for Washington, D.C., as well as the 34th rated recruit of the 2017 Class per ESPN's HoopGurlz rankings.

During Sheppard's freshman year, she became known as a 3-point sharpshooter. She led the team with 76 3-pointers made during the year. On February 22, 2018, Sheppard rained in 7 3-pointers vs. Notre Dame - which tied the program record for most 3's in a game.

Sheppard began her sophomore campaign doing similar things as her freshman year - being a shooter. She continued her be a sniper from outside knocking down 59 threes this year to move into 8th place All-Time in program history. Sheppard scored 17 points against 13th rank Miami on February 21, to give the Hokies a signature win.

During her junior year, Sheppard moved into the starting lineup full-time and averaged double digits for the first time in her career. Sheppard averaged 14.8 points and 3.1 rebounds. Once again, she proved to be one of the best shooters in the ACC, as well as the NCAA. She finished behind Dana Evans in both percentage and 3-pointer made per game. Sheppard was named to the All-ACC Second Team for her outstanding year.

Sheppard continued her upward trend into her senior year, once again starting all the games for the Hokies. She averaged 17.7 points, 2.7 rebounds, and 3.0 assists. On January 28, 2021, Sheppard helped led the Hokies to a win over #2 NC State. She scored 28 points to help the Hokies to Virginia Tech's high ever AP ranked win.

After graduating from Virginia Tech, Sheppard decided to use her extra-COVID year of eligibility and return to the Hokies for one more year. Sheppard cemented her status on one of the best 3-point shooters in ACC History on February 13, 2022, when she passed AD's ACC record for career 3-point field goals made with 375. Sheppard was named to the All-ACC Second Team once again this year.

Sheppard finished her career as the program's All-Time Leading Scorer with 1,883 points, as well as taking over the ACC 3-Point Record for Makes with 402.

== College statistics ==
Year	Team	GP	Points	FG%	3P%	FT%	RPG	APG	SPG	BPG	PPG
2017–18	Virginia Tech	37	308	.389	.374	.743	1.6	1.2	0.8	0.4	8.3
2018–19	Virginia Tech	34	252	.379	.378	.825	1.9	1.5	0.7	0.3	7.4
2019–20	Virginia Tech	30	443	.387	.370	.772	3.1	1.6	1.2	0.1	14.8
2020–21	Virginia Tech	25	442	.382	.354	.842	2.7	3.0	1.1	0.1	17.7
2021–22	Virginia Tech	33	438	.394	.387	.889	3.3	2.6	0.7	0.2	13.3
Career		159	1883	.387	.372	.821	2.5	1.9	0.9	0.2	11.8

== WNBA career ==
=== Las Vegas Aces ===
In the 2022 WNBA draft, Sheppard was taken 23rd overall by the Las Vegas Aces. Sheppard appeared in 23 games for the Aces during her rookie season and was a part of their 2022 WNBA Championship run.

Sheppard was waived by the Aces during training camp prior to the 2023 season.

== WNBA career statistics ==
Legend
GP	Games played	GS	Games started	MPG	Minutes per game	RPG	Rebounds per game
APG	Assists per game	SPG	Steals per game	BPG	Blocks per game	PPG	Points per game
TO	Turnovers per game	FG%	Field-goal percentage	3P%	3-point field-goal percentage	FT%	Free-throw percentage
**Bold**	Career best	°	League leader

†	Denotes seasons in which Sheppard won a WNBA championship

=== Regular season ===
Year	Team	GP	GS	MPG	FG%	3P%	FT%	RPG	APG	SPG	BPG	TO	PPG
2022^{†}	Las Vegas	23	0	7.6	.238	.273	.750	0.6	0.3	0.2	0.0	0.3	1.5
Career	1 year, 1 team	23	0	7.6	.238	.273	.750	0.6	0.3	0.2	0.0	0.3	1.5

=== Playoffs ===
Year	Team	GP	GS	MPG	FG%	3P%	FT%	RPG	APG	SPG	BPG	TO	PPG
2022^{†}	Las Vegas	4	0	4.0	.000	.000	.000	0.0	0.8	0.0	0.0	0.5	0.0
Career	1 year, 1 team	4	0	4.0	.000	.000	.000	0.0	0.8	0.0	0.0	0.5	0.0

== Spanish career ==
After her time in the Chinese league where she played for Xiamen Egrets, on June 27, 2026, her signing with Basket Zaragoza, of the Spanish women's league, was announced.
