= 2022 WNBA Commissioner's Cup =

WNBA Commissioner's Cup

2022 WNBA Commissioner's Cup Game
Cup Final
Las Vegas Aces	Chicago Sky
(9–1)	(9–1)
93	83
Head coach: Becky Hammon	Head coach: James Wade
	1	2	3	4	Total
Las Vegas Aces	33	15	22	23	93
Chicago Sky	14	20	26	23	83
- Date: July 26, 2022
- Venue: Wintrust Arena, Chicago
- MVP: Chelsea Gray (Las Vegas)
- Referees: Maj Forsberg, Billy Smith, Isaac Barnett
- Attendance: 8,922

United States TV coverage
- Network: Amazon Prime
- Announcers: Sarah Kustok; Michael Grady; Dawn Staley

The 2022 WNBA Commissioner's Cup presented by Coinbase was the WNBA's second Commissioner's Cup in league history. The Cup Final featured the top Eastern Conference Cup team facing off against the top Western Conference team. The home team was decided by the team with the highest winning percentage in Cup Play.

== Road to the Cup Final ==
The Commissioner's Cup starts by designating a portion of regular-season games – 10 games per team – as counting toward Cup play. The team from each conference with the top record in designated “Cup games” then compete for the Commissioner's Cup title and a special prize pool. Cup games are the first home game and first road game each team plays against its five conference rivals.

The Las Vegas Aces clinched the Western Conference spot in the Cup Final on June 15, 2022, after their win against the Dallas Wings. The Chicago Sky clinched the Eastern Conference spot on June 19, 2022.

=== Standings ===
Eastern Conference
Pos	Team	Pld	W	L
1	Chicago Sky	10	9	1
2	New York Liberty	10	6	4
3	Connecticut Sun	10	5	5
4	Washington Mystics	10	5	5
5	Atlanta Dream	10	3	7
6	Indiana Fever	10	2	8

Western Conference
Pos	Team	Pld	W	L
1	Las Vegas Aces	10	9	1
2	Seattle Storm	10	6	4
3	Dallas Wings	10	5	5
4	Minnesota Lynx	10	4	6
5	Phoenix Mercury	10	3	7
6	Los Angeles Sparks	10	3	7

== Funding to Local Non-Profits ==
New this year, there will be incentives to win with money for local nonprofits. The WNBA will donate $2,000 to the chosen organization of each cup game's winning team and an additional $500 to the losing team's organization. In the Championship Game for the Commissioner's Cup, the league will donate $10,000 to the winning team's chosen organization and $5,000 to the organization of the runner-up. The accumulating donation dollars will be presented to each organization at the conclusion of the Commissioner's Cup.

== Game Summary ==
Amazon Prime

July 26
8:30pm ET

Report

Las Vegas Aces 93, Chicago Sky 83
Scoring by quarter: 33-14, 15-20, 22-26, 23-23
Pts: Kelsey Plum (24); Rebs: A'ja Wilson (17); Asts: Kelsey Plum (6)	Pts: Candace Parker (20); Rebs: Candace Parker (14); Asts: Julie Allemand (6)

Wintrust Arena
Attendance: 8,922
Referees: Maj Forsberg, Billy Smith, Isaac Barnett

== Team rosters ==
Las Vegas Aces roster
Players
Coaches

Pos.	No.	Nat.	Name	Height	Weight	DOB	From	Yrs
F	1	(United States)	Bell, Kierstan	6' 1" (1.85m)	176 lb (80kg)	2000-03-16	Florida Gulf Coast	R
G	51	(United States)	Colson, Sydney	5' 8" (1.73m)	140 lb (64kg)	1989-08-06	Texas A&M	7
G	12	(United States)	Gray, Chelsea	5' 11" (1.8m)	170 lb (77kg)	1992-10-08	Duke	7
F	5	(United States)	Hamby, Dearica	6' 3" (1.91m)	189 lb (86kg)	1993-11-06	Wake Forest	7
F	55	(United States)	Plaisance, Theresa	6' 5" (1.96m)	200 lb (91kg)	1992-05-18	LSU	8
G	10	(United States)	Plum, Kelsey	5' 8" (1.73m)	145 lb (66kg)	1994-08-24	Washington	4
C	21	(France)	Rupert, Iliana	6' 4" (1.93m)	189 lb (86kg)	2001-07-12	France	R
G	4	(United States)	Sheppard, Aisha	5' 9" (1.75m)	145 lb (66kg)	1993-03-30	Virginia Tech	R
C	41	(Turkey)	Stokes, Kiah	6' 3" (1.91m)	191 lb (87kg)	1993-03-30	Connecticut	6
G	2	(United States)	Williams, Riquna	5' 6" (1.68m)	165 lb (75kg)	1990-05-28	Miami (FL)	9
F	22	(United States)	Wilson, A'ja	6' 4" (1.93m)	195 lb (88kg)	1996-08-08	South Carolina	4
G	0	(United States)	Young, Jackie	6' 0" (1.83m)	165 lb (75kg)	1997-09-16	Notre Dame	3

Head coach
(Russia) Becky Hammon (Colorado State)
Assistant coaches
(United States) Natalie Nakase (UCLA)
(United States) Tyler Marsh (Birmingham–Southern)
(United States) Charlene Thomas-Swinson (Auburn)
Athletic trainer
(United States) Michelle Anumba (Duke)

Legend

- (C) Team captain
- (DP) Unsigned draft pick
- (FA) Free agent
- (S) Suspended
- Injured

WNBA roster page

East
ATL
CHI
CON
IND
NY
TOR
WAS
West
DAL
GS
LV
LA
MIN
PHO
POR
SEA

Chicago Sky roster
Players
Coaches

Pos.	No.	Nat.	Name	Height	Weight	DOB	From	Yrs
G	20	(Belgium)	Allemand, Julie	5' 8" (1.73m)	147 lb (67kg)	1996-107-07	Belgium	1
G/F	2	(United States)	Copper, Kahleah	6' 1" (1.85m)	165 lb (75kg)	1994-08-28	Rutgers	6
G	11	(United States)	Evans, Dana	5' 6" (1.68m)	145 lb (66kg)	1998-08-01	Louisville	1
G	35	(United States)	Gardner, Rebekah	6' 1" (1.85m)	130 lb (59kg)	1990-07-09	UCLA	R
F	24	(United States)	Hebard, Ruthy	6' 4" (1.93m)	190 lb (86kg)	1998-04-28	Oregon	2
F	33	(Belgium)	Meesseman, Emma	6' 4" (1.93m)	191 lb (87kg)	1993-05-13	Belgium	7
F/C	3	(United States)	Parker, Candace	6' 4" (1.93m)	184 lb (83kg)	1986-04-19	Tennessee	14
G	14	(Hungary)	Quigley, Allie	5' 10" (1.78m)	142 lb (64kg)	1986-06-20	DePaul	13
F/C	30	(United States)	Stevens, Azurá	6' 6" (1.98m)	180 lb (82kg)	1996-02-01	Connecticut	4
G	22	(Hungary)	Vandersloot, Courtney	5' 8" (1.73m)	137 lb (62kg)	1989-02-08	Gonzaga	11
C	28	(China)	Yueru, Li	6' 7" (2.01m)	200 lb (91kg)	1999-03-28	China	R

Head coach
(United States) James Wade (Kennesaw State)
Assistant coaches
(United States) Tonya Edwards (Tennessee)
(Belgium) Ann Wauters
(Turkey) Emre Vatansever
Athletic trainer
(United States) Meghan Lockerby
Strength and conditioning coach
(United States) Ann Crosby

Legend

- (C) Team captain
- (DP) Unsigned draft pick
- (FA) Free agent
- (S) Suspended
- Injured

WNBA roster page

East
ATL
CHI
CON
IND
NY
TOR
WAS
West
DAL
GS
LV
LA
MIN
PHO
POR
SEA
