= 2022 WNBA Finals =

Championship series of the 2022 WNBA season

Team	Coach	Wins
Las Vegas Aces	Becky Hammon	3
Connecticut Sun	Curt Miller	1
- Dates: September 11–18
- MVP: Chelsea Gray (Las Vegas Aces)
- Hall of Famers: Coaches: Becky Hammon (2023, player)
- Eastern finals: Connecticut Sun defeated Chicago Sky 3–2 (Note: the semifinal rounds as of 2016 were not divided by conference)
- Western finals: Las Vegas Aces defeated Seattle Storm 3–1

The 2022 WNBA Finals (branded as the WNBA Finals 2022 presented by YouTube TV for sponsorship reasons) was the best-of-five championship series for the 2022 season of the Women's National Basketball Association (WNBA). The finals featured the first-seeded Las Vegas Aces facing off against the third-seeded Connecticut Sun. The Aces defeated the Sun in 4 games, winning their first WNBA Championship. This was Las Vegas's third time making the finals, and the second time since moving to Vegas. They previously competed in the Finals in 2008 and 2020. This was Connecticut's fourth time making the finals. They previously competed in 2004, 2005, and 2019.

The Aces won the finals three games to one to claim their first championship in franchise history. Head coach Becky Hammon became the first rookie head coach to win the WNBA Title. In the WNBA's Inaugural Finals, Van Chancellor was a rookie to the WNBA, but had coached in college for nineteen years before winning the WNBA title. Alyssa Thomas recorded the first WNBA Finals triple-double in Game Three. She recorded the second in Finals history in Game Four. The Aces also became the first team to win both the WNBA Commissioner's Cup and the WNBA Finals in the same season.

== Road to the Finals ==
=== Standings ===
#	Team	W	L	PCT	GB	Conf.	Home	Road	Cup
1	**x** – Las Vegas Aces	26	10	.722	–	15–3	13–5	13–5	9–1
2	**x** – Chicago Sky	26	10	.722	–	15–3	14–4	12–6	9–1
3	**x** – Connecticut Sun	25	11	.694	1.0	11–7	13–5	12–6	5–5
4	**x** – Seattle Storm	22	14	.611	4.0	10–8	13–5	9–9	6–4
5	**x** – Washington Mystics	22	14	.611	4.0	11–7	12–6	10–8	5–5
6	**x** – Dallas Wings	18	18	.500	8.0	8–10	8–10	10–8	5–5
7	**x** – New York Liberty	16	20	.444	10.0	10–8	9–9	7–11	6–4
8	**x** – Phoenix Mercury	15	21	.417	11.0	7–11	11–7	4–14	3–7
9	**e** – Minnesota Lynx	14	22	.389	12.0	8–10	7–11	7–11	4–6
10	**e** – Atlanta Dream	14	22	.389	12.0	5–13	8–10	6–12	3–7
11	**e** – Los Angeles Sparks	13	23	.361	13.0	6–12	7–11	6–12	3–7
12	**e** – Indiana Fever	5	31	.139	21.0	2–16	3–15	2–16	2–8

Notes

(#) – League Standing
x – Clinched playoff berth
e – Eliminated from playoff contention
Source: Overall standings and Commissioner's Cup Standings

=== Playoffs ===
**First round** Best-of-3
**1**	**Las Vegas Aces**	**2**
8	Phoenix Mercury	0
**4**	**Seattle Storm**	**2**
5	Washington Mystics	0
**2**	**Chicago Sky**	**2**
7	New York Liberty	1
**3**	**Connecticut Sun**	**2**
6	Dallas Wings	1

**Semifinals**; Best-of-5
**1**	**Las Vegas Aces**	**3**
4	Seattle Storm	1
2	Chicago Sky	2
**3**	**Connecticut Sun**	**3**

**Finals**; Best-of-5
**1**	**Las Vegas Aces**	**3**
3	Connecticut Sun	1

- **Bold** – Series winner
- Italic – Team with home-court advantage

In November 2021, the WNBA Board of Governors formalized a new playoff system that will structure the 2022 playoffs onward. The new playoff format scraps the single-elimination games of the first two rounds in favor of a best-of-3 quarterfinal round. As a result, all eight playoff teams, seeded according to overall regular season record regardless of conference (1 vs. 8, 2 vs. 7, 3 vs. 6, 4 vs. 5), will begin postseason play in the first round. Since 2016, seeds 3 and 4 received a bye to the second round (single game) and seeds 1 and 2 received a bye to the semifinals (best-of-5). In the first round series, the higher seeded team will host games 1 and 2, and the lower seeded team will host game 3 if necessary. In the semifinal round, no reseeding will take place, which means the winners of the 1 vs. 8 series will be paired with the winner of the 4 vs. 5 series as will the winners of the 2 vs. 7 and 3 vs. 6 series. The semifinal and final rounds will remain best-of-5 series in which the higher seeded team hosts games 1, 2 and (if necessary) 5 while the lower seeded team hosts games 3 and (if necessary) 4.

The Las Vegas Aces qualified for the finals after finishing first in the regular season standings. They defeated the Phoenix Mercury 2–0 in the first round and the Seattle Storm 3–1 in the second round. This was the Ace's first appearance in the finals since 2020.

The Connecticut Sun qualified for the finals after finishing third in the regular season standings. They defeated the Dallas Wings 2–1 in the first round and the defending champions Chicago Sky 3–2 in the second round. This was the Sun's first appearance in the finals since 2019.

The Aces had an extra two days of rest coming into the finals, as their Semifinal series ended on September 6, but the Sun had to play a fifth game in their series on September 8. The Sun have had to play two additional games in their first two playoff rounds. The teams played three times in the regular season, with Las Vegas winning two of the games.

== Summary ==
=== Game 1 ===
Las Vegas hosted Game One and the Aces used the home court to their advantage in the first quarter to win 25–17. However, the Sun came back and dominated the second quarter, winning 21–9. The Sun entered halftime with a four-point lead on the road. The Aces came roaring out of halftime and won the third quarter 21–15, and held a two-point lead going into the final quarter. In a low scoring fourth quarter, Las Vegas prevailed 12–11 and won Game One by three points. The Aces had three players score in double figures and were led by A'ja Wilson. Wilson recorded a double-double with twenty-four points and eleven rebounds. Chelsea Gray scored twenty-one points and Jackie Young scored eleven. The Sun had four players score in double figures and were led by Alyssa Thomas. Thomas posted her sixth double-double of the playoffs with nineteen points and eleven rebounds. Jonquel Jones scored fifteen points, Brionna Jones added twelve, and Natisha Hiedeman rounded out the double-digit scorers with ten.

ABC, TSN5

September 11
3:00 p.m.

Report

#1 Las Vegas Aces 67, #3 Connecticut Sun 64
Scoring by quarter: 25–17, 9–21, 21–15, 12–11
Pts: A'ja Wilson (24); Rebs: A'ja Wilson (11); Asts: Chelsea Gray (3)	Pts: Alyssa Thomas (19); Rebs: Alyssa Thomas (11); Asts: DeWanna Bonner; Alyssa Thomas (5)

Michelob Ultra Arena
Attendance: 10,135
Referees: Eric Brewton, Tiara Cruse, Dannica Mosher, Randy Richardson

=== Game 2 ===
The Aces continued their winning ways in quarter one of Game 2 by winning 23–15. The Sun stabilized in the second quarter and finished tied at 22 with the Aces. That let the Aces take an eight-point lead into halftime. The Aces came out strong and won the third quarter 23–17, extending their lead to fourteen points. The fourth quarter finished tied at 17, and the Aces won the game comfortably. The Aces took a two to zero lead in the series. The 0–2 deficit does not bode well for Connecticut as no team that has dropped the first two games of a WNBA playoff series has gone on to win the series.

The Aces had three players score in double digits, and all scored twenty or more points. They were led by A'ja Wilson who scored twenty six points and had ten rebounds to record her second double-double of the Finals. Chelsea Gray added twenty one points and Kelsey Plum scored twenty points. The Sun had four players score in double digits, and were led by Courtney Williams who scored eighteen points. Jonquel Jones recorded a double-double with sixteen points and eleven rebounds. Alyssa Thomas scored thirteen points and Brionna Jones added twelve points from the bench.

ESPN, TSN1/4

September 13
9:00 p.m.

Report

#1 Las Vegas Aces 85, #3 Connecticut Sun 71
Scoring by quarter: 23–15, 22–22, 23–17, 17–17
Pts: A'ja Wilson (26); Rebs: A'ja Wilson (10); Asts: Chelsea Gray (8)	Pts: Courtney Williams (18); Rebs: Jonquel Jones (11); Asts: Courtney Williams (5)

Michelob Ultra Arena
Attendance: 10,211
Referees: Roy Gulbeyan, Tim Greene, Cheryl Flores, Dannica Mosher

=== Game 3 ===
Connecticut came out strong on their home court in the first quarter of Game Three and won the quarter 34–19. Las Vegas made a slight recovery and won the second quarter 23–19, which left Connecticut's lead at eleven points heading into half time. Las Vegas won quarter three 27–24 to cut the lead to eight points. However, Connecticut dominated the fourth quarter 28–7 and won Game Three by twenty-nine points. The Sun had six players score in double digits and were led by Alyssa Thomas. Thomas scored a triple-double with sixteen points, fifteen rebounds, and eleven assists. It was Thomas' third triple-double of the season and the first triple-double scored in the WNBA Finals. Jonquel Jones lead the team in scoring with twenty points. DeWanna Bonner added eighteen points, Natisha Hiedeman scored fourteen, DiJonai Carrington scored twelve points from the bench, and Courtney Williams added eleven. The Aces had four players score in double figures and were led by Jackie Young with twenty-two points. A'ja Wilson scored nineteen points, Kelsey Plum added seventeen, and Chelsea Gray scored eleven.

ESPN, SN360

September 15
9:00 p.m.

Report

#3 Connecticut Sun 105, #1 Las Vegas Aces 76
Scoring by quarter: 34–19, 19–23, 24–27, 28–7
Pts: Jonquel Jones (20); Rebs: Alyssa Thomas (15); Asts: Alyssa Thomas (11)	Pts: Jackie Young (22); Rebs: Kiah Stokes (7); Asts: Chelsea Gray (11)

Mohegan Sun Arena
Attendance: 8,745
Referees: Amy Bonner, Maj Forsberg, Isaac Barnett

=== Game 4 ===
Game Four started out with Las Vegas holding a slight edge as they won the first quarter 16–12. The second quarter as also a low-scoring, close quarter with Connecticut coming out on top 16–14. Las Vegas took a two-point lead into halftime and slightly expanded on it in the third quarter, which they won 23–21. The game was back-and-forth in the fourth quarter, with Connecticut leading with as little as two minutes left in the game. However, Las Vegas scored the final eight points of the game, and won the fourth quarter 25–22 to win the game by six points. They won the series three games to one.

Las Vegas had five players score in double digits, and the highest scorer was Chelsea Gray with twenty. Riquna Williams scored seventeen points, Kelsey Plum scored fifteen, Jackie Young scored thirteen points, and A'ja Wilson scored eleven points. Wilson also grabbed fourteen rebounds to record her third double-double of the finals. The Sun also had five players score in double digits, led by Courtney Williams who scored seventeen points. Jonquel Jones scored thirteen points, DeWanna Bonner scored twelve and Brionna Jones and Alyssa Thomas both scored eleven points. Thomas' recorded a triple-double by adding ten rebounds and eleven assists. This was only the second triple-double in WNBA Finals history, after Thomas' in Game Three.

ESPN, SN1

September 18
4:00 p.m.

Report

#3 Connecticut Sun 71, #1 Las Vegas Aces 78
Scoring by quarter: 12–16, 16–14, 21–23, 22–25
Pts: Courtney Williams (17); Rebs: Alyssa Thomas (10); Asts: Alyssa Thomas (11)	Pts: Chelsea Gray (20); Rebs: A'ja Wilson (14); Asts: Jackie Young (8)

Mohegan Sun Arena
Attendance: 9,652
Referees: Eric Brewton, Tim Greene, Tiara Cruse

== Team rosters ==
2022 Las Vegas Aces roster
Players
Coaches

Pos.	No.	Nat.	Name	Height	Weight	DOB	From	Yrs
F	1	(United States)	Bell, Kierstan	6' 1" (1.85m)	176 lb (80kg)	2000-03-16	Florida Gulf Coast	R
G	51	(United States)	Colson, Sydney	5' 8" (1.73m)	140 lb (64kg)	1989-08-06	Texas A&M	7
G	12	(United States)	Gray, Chelsea	5' 11" (1.8m)	170 lb (77kg)	1992-10-08	Duke	7
F	5	(United States)	Hamby, Dearica	6' 3" (1.91m)	189 lb (86kg)	1993-11-06	Wake Forest	7
F	55	(United States)	Plaisance, Theresa	6' 5" (1.96m)	200 lb (91kg)	1992-05-18	LSU	8
G	10	(United States)	Plum, Kelsey	5' 8" (1.73m)	145 lb (66kg)	1994-08-24	Washington	4
C	21	(France)	Rupert, Iliana	6' 4" (1.93m)	189 lb (86kg)	2001-07-12	France	R
G	4	(United States)	Sheppard, Aisha	5' 9" (1.75m)	145 lb (66kg)	1993-03-30	Virginia Tech	R
C	41	(United States)	Stokes, Kiah	6' 3" (1.91m)	191 lb (87kg)	1993-03-30	Connecticut	6
G	2	(United States)	Williams, Riquna	5' 6" (1.68m)	165 lb (75kg)	1990-05-28	Miami (FL)	9
F	22	(United States)	Wilson, A'ja	6' 4" (1.93m)	195 lb (88kg)	1996-08-08	South Carolina	4
G	0	(United States)	Young, Jackie	6' 0" (1.83m)	165 lb (75kg)	1997-09-16	Notre Dame	3

Head coach
(United States) Becky Hammon (Colorado State)
Assistant coaches
(United States) Natalie Nakase (UCLA)
(United States) Tyler Marsh (Birmingham–Southern)
(United States) Charlene Thomas-Swinson (Auburn)
Athletic trainer
(United States) Michelle Anumba (Duke)

Legend

- (C) Team captain
- (DP) Unsigned draft pick
- (FA) Free agent
- (S) Suspended
- Injured

=== Depth ===
Pos.	Starter	Bench
C	Kiah Stokes	Iliana Rupert
PF	A'ja Wilson	Dearica Hamby; Theresa Plaisance
SF	Jackie Young	Kierstan Bell
SG	Kelsey Plum	Riquna Williams; Aisha Sheppard
PG	Chelsea Gray	Sydney Colson

2022 Connecticut Sun roster
Players
Coaches

Pos.	No.	Nat.	Name	Height	Weight	DOB	From	Yrs
G/F	24	(North Macedonia)	Bonner, DeWanna	6' 4" (1.93m)	143 lb (65kg)	1987-08-21	Auburn	12
G/F	21	(United States)	Carrington, DiJonai	5' 11" (1.8m)	175 lb (79kg)	1998-01-08	Baylor	1
G	11	(United States)	Clouden, Nia	5' 9" (1.75m)	142 lb (64kg)	2000-05-17	Michigan State	R
G	14	(United States)	Hartley, Bria (injured)	5' 9" (1.75m)	148 lb (67kg)	1992-09-30	Connecticut	8
G	2	(United States)	Hiedeman, Natisha	5' 8" (1.73m)	135 lb (61kg)	1997-02-10	Marquette	3
F	8	(United States)	Holmes, Joyner	6' 3" (1.91m)	210 lb (95kg)	1998-02-22	Texas	2
F	42	(United States)	Jones, Brionna	6' 3" (1.91m)	230 lb (104kg)	1995-12-18	Maryland	5
F	35	(Bosnia and Herzegovina)	Jones, Jonquel	6' 6" (1.98m)	190 lb (86kg)	1994-01-05	George Washington	5
G	1	(United States)	Sims, Odyssey	5' 8" (1.73m)	155 lb (70kg)	1992-07-13	Baylor	8
F	25	(United States)	Thomas, Alyssa	6' 2" (1.88m)	185 lb (84kg)	1992-04-12	Maryland	8
G	5	(United States)	Thomas, Jasmine (injured)	5' 9" (1.75m)	143 lb (65kg)	1989-09-30	Duke	11
G	10	(United States)	Williams, Courtney	5' 8" (1.73m)	133 lb (60kg)	1994-05-11	South Florida	6

Head coach
(United States) Curt Miller (Baldwin Wallace)
Assistant coaches
(United States) Brandi Poole (Sewanee)
(United States) Chris Koclanes
Athletic trainer
(United States) Nicole Alexander
Strength and conditioning coach
(United States) Analisse Rios

Legend

- (C) Team captain
- (DP) Unsigned draft pick
- (FA) Free agent
- (S) Suspended
- Injured

=== Depth chart ===
Pos.	Starter	Bench
C	Jonquel Jones	Brionna Jones
PF	Alyssa Thomas	Joyner Holmes
SF	DeWanna Bonner	DiJonai Carrington
SG	Courtney Williams	Nia Clouden; Bria Hartley
PG	Natisha Hiedeman	Odyssey Sims; Jasmine Thomas
