= Riquna Williams =

American basketball player (born 1990)

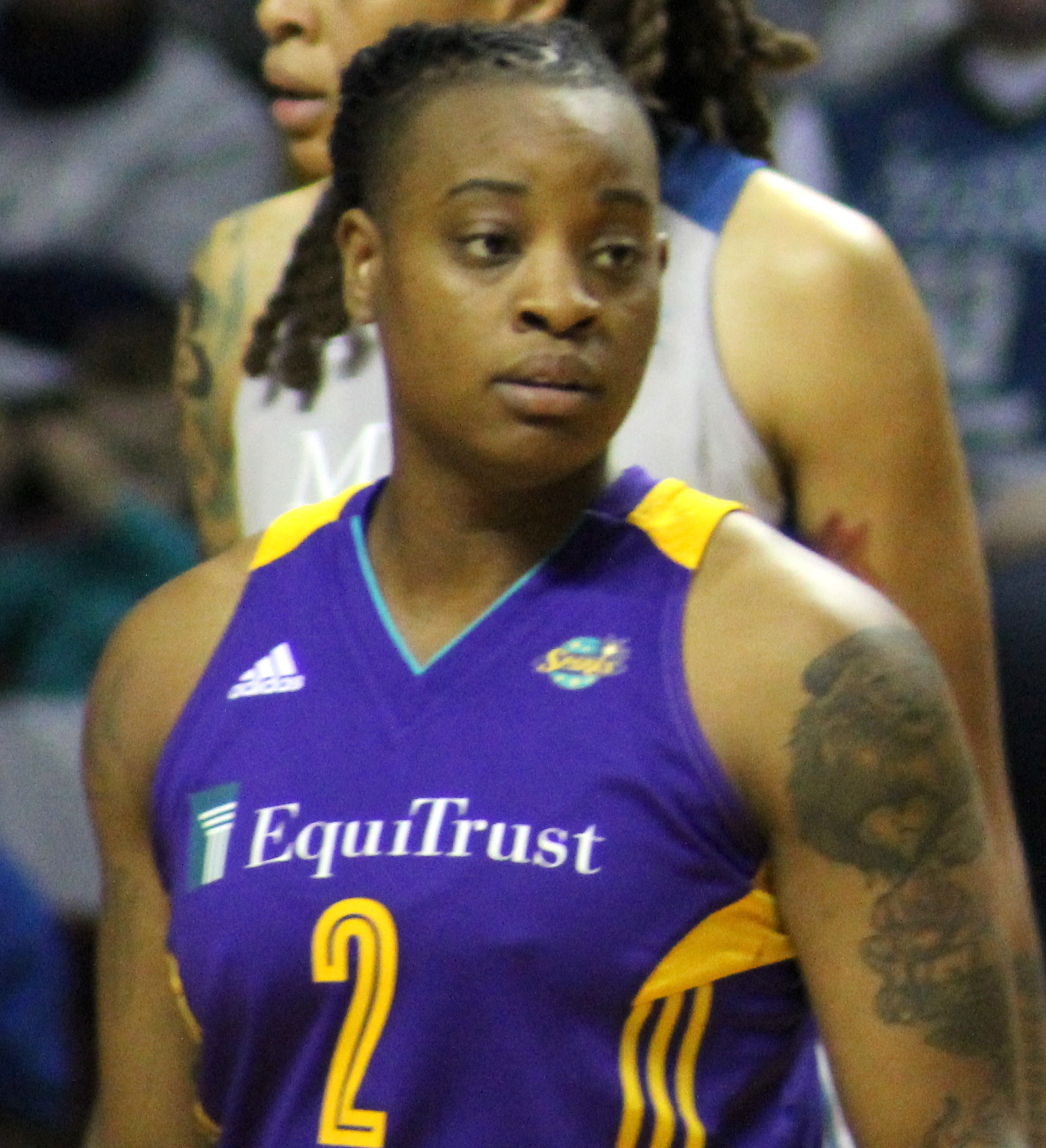
- Williams with the Los Angeles Sparks in 2017

Personal information
- Born: May 28, 1990 (age 36) Pahokee, Florida, U.S.
- Listed height: 5 ft 7 in (1.70 m)
- Listed weight: 165 lb (75 kg)

Career information
- High school: Pahokee (Pahokee, Florida)
- College: Miami (Florida) (2008–2012)
- WNBA draft: 2012: 2nd round, 17th overall pick
- Drafted by: Tulsa Shock
- Playing career: 2012–present
- Position: Point guard / shooting guard

Career history
- 2012–2015: Tulsa Shock
- 2012–2013: Good Angels Košice
- 2013–2014: Hapoel Rishon Lezion
- 2014: Virtus Eirene Ragusa
- 2015: Adana ASKİ SK
- 2015–2016: Al Nasr Sports Club
- 2016–2017: Osmaniye GSK
- 2017–2020: Los Angeles Sparks
- 2017–2018: Reyer Venezia
- 2019: Hatay Büyükşehir Belediyespor
- 2019–2020: Elazığ İl Özel İdarespor
- 2020–2021: OGM Ormanspor
- 2021–2023: Las Vegas Aces
- 2021–2022: Galatasaray
- 2022–2023: OGM Ormanspor

Career highlights
- 2× WNBA champion (2022, 2023); Commissioner’s Cup champion (2022); WNBA All-Star (2015); WNBA Sixth Woman of the Year (2013); WNBA All-Rookie Team (2012); Third-team All-American – AP (2012); 2× First-team All-ACC (2011, 2012)
- Stats at WNBA.com
- Stats at Basketball Reference

Riquna "Bay Bay" Williams (born May 28, 1990) is an American basketball player who is a free agent. She played collegiately for the Miami Hurricanes of the University of Miami, where she majored in sports administration.

Riquna's nickname is Bay Bay. She is the youngest of five children. As a senior in high school she averaged 32.5 points per game at Pahokee High School. As a freshman at the University of Miami she averaged 8.7 points per game, including a season high of 23 points against Clemson.

She was first discovered during the summer going into her senior year of high school playing for Team Breakdown.

She emerged as one of the best scorers in the country in her sophomore year, and averaged 19.6 points per game. She was named to the All-ACC Second Team her sophomore year

Williams was named to the pre-season Wooden watch list, a list of players under consideration for the John R. Wooden Award, which will be presented to the outstanding player of the year at the end of the season.

== College statistics ==
Legend
GP	Games played	GS	Games started	MPG	Minutes per game
FG%	Field goal percentage	3P%	3-point field goal percentage	FT%	Free throw percentage
RPG	Rebounds per game	APG	Assists per game	SPG	Steals per game
BPG	Blocks per game	PPG	Points per game	**Bold**	Career high

Year	Team	GP	Points	FG%	3P%	FT%	RPG	APG	SPG	BPG	PPG
2008–09	Miami (Florida)	26	227	29.9	21.6	77.0	2.0	0.7	1.7	0.4	8.7
2009–10	Miami (Florida)	**36**	707	**40.3**	36.1	73.6	4.2	1.7	1.8	0.5	19.6
2010–11	Miami (Florida)	33	**717**	39.7	29.8	77.3	**5.3**	**2.8**	**2.8**	0.5	**21.7**°
2011–12	Miami (Florida)	30	497	39.7	**36.8**	**80.4**	3.4	2.6	2.4	**0.7**	16.6
Career	Miami (Florida)	125	2148	38.6	32.4	76.9	3.9	2.0	2.2	0.5	17.2

== WNBA career ==
Williams was selected with the 17th overall pick, second round of the 2012 WNBA draft by the Tulsa Shock. In her rookie season with the Shock, Williams averaged 10.5 points per game off the bench as the Shock's back-up point guard. She was listed on the WNBA All-Rookie Team by the end of the season.

Williams would have a breakout year in the 2013 season, averaging a career-high 15.6 points per game despite starting in only 6 of the 27 games she played during the season. On September 8, 2013, Williams had the best offensive performance in WNBA history as she set the record for most points in a single game by scoring 51 points (which has since been broken by Liz Cambage in July, 2018), at the same time tying the WNBA record for most three-point field goals in a single game, with 8 three-pointers (which has since been broken by Kristi Toliver), in a 98–65 win over the San Antonio Silver Stars. Following that performance she would win the 2013 WNBA Sixth Woman of the Year

Williams had an injury-riddled season in 2014, after playing only 11 games she sat out the rest of the season with a knee injury and underwent surgery.

In the 2015 season, Williams came back healthy and continued to flourish as a player, tying her career-high in scoring average and was voted as a WNBA all-star for the first time in her career. With Skylar Diggins out with a torn ACL after the first 9 games, Williams stepped in as the starting point guard, leading the Shock to a playoff berth with an 18–16 record which was enough for the number 3 seed in the Western Conference. The Shock were eliminated in a 2-game sweep by the Phoenix Mercury in the first round.

Prior to the 2016 season, Williams was traded to the Los Angeles Sparks along with the sixth pick in the 2016 WNBA draft in exchange for Erin Phillips, the fifth pick in the 2016 WNBA draft and a first round draft pick in the 2017 WNBA draft. However, Williams suffered a ruptured left achilles tendon while playing in Dubai during the off-season. She required surgery that would keep her out for the entire 2016 season. Without Williams on the roster, the Sparks would still go on to win the 2016 WNBA Championship after defeating the Minnesota Lynx 3–2 in Finals.

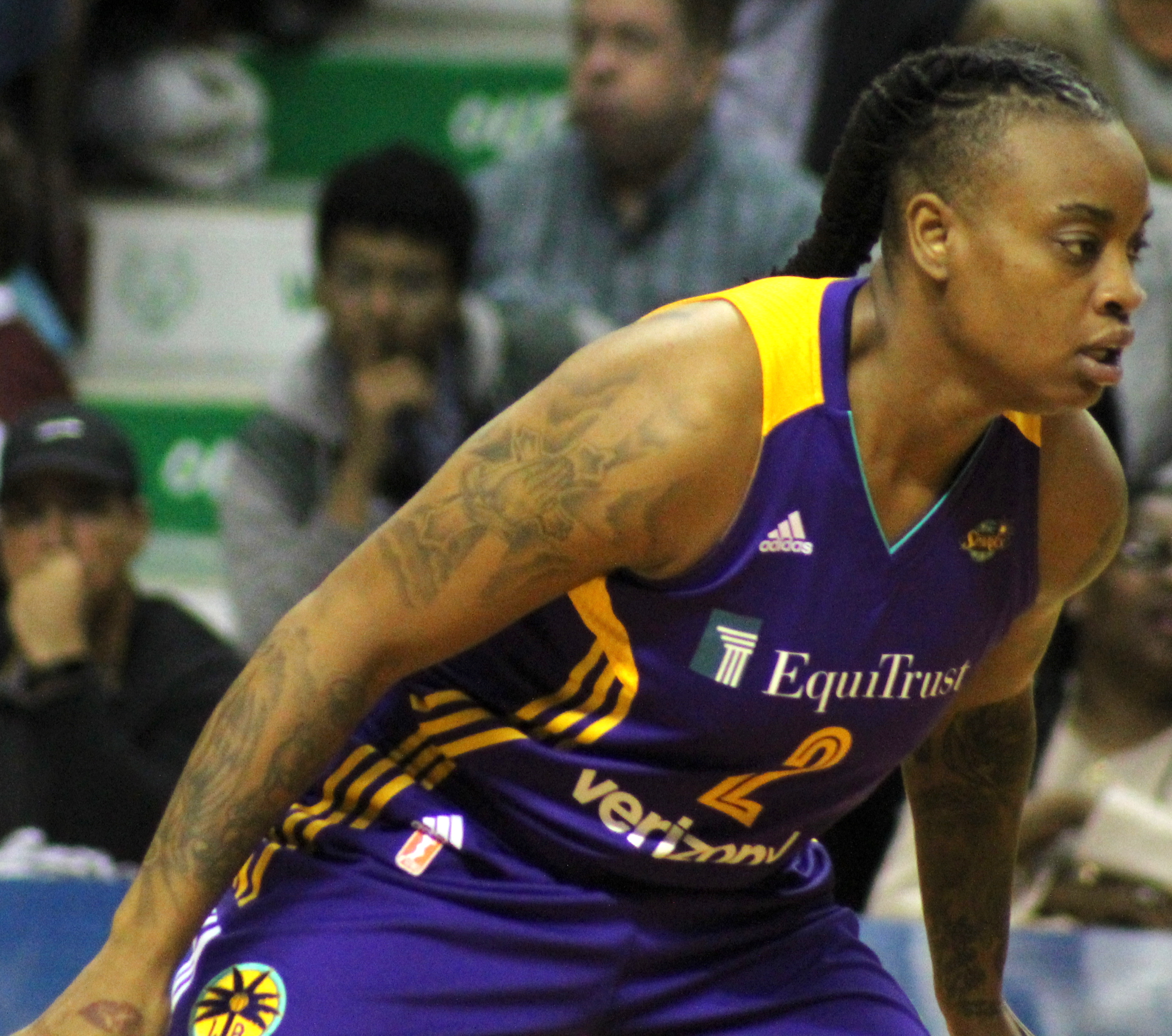
Williams with the Los Angeles Sparks in the 2017 WNBA Finals

During the 2017 season after recovering from her achilles injury, Williams was playing off the bench. On May 13, 2017, Williams recorded 1 rebound and 1 assist in 12 minutes of play in her Sparks debut. On June 18, 2017, Williams scored a season-high 15 points in a 90–59 victory over the Mercury. On August 6, 2017, Williams suffered a left knee strain during a game against the Dallas Wings and was listed as day-to-day missing a few games. The Sparks finished with a 26–8 record and the number 2 seed in the league, receiving a double-bye to the semi-finals. Williams would make her return from injury in Game 2 of the semi-finals against the Mercury, recording 1 rebound in 5 minutes of play. The Sparks would advance to the Finals for the second season in a row after defeating the Mercury in a 3-game sweep, setting up a rematch with the Lynx. However, the Sparks would lose in five games.

On June 24, 2018, Williams scored a season-high 25 points off the bench, along with 7 three-pointers in an 80–54 victory over the New York Liberty. Towards the end of the 2018 season, Williams would be the starting point guard for the Sparks coming into the playoffs. The Sparks finished as the number 6 seed with a 19–15 record. In the first round elimination game, the Sparks defeated the Minnesota Lynx 75–68 to advance. In the second round elimination game, the Sparks lost 96–64 to the Washington Mystics.

On May 15, 2019, Williams re-signed with the Sparks. Williams played 23 games with 14 starts, she had been suspended for 10 games due to an alleged domestic violence incident. The Sparks finished 22–12 as the number 3 seed with a bye to second round. In the second round elimination game the Sparks defeated the defending champion Seattle Storm 92–69, in the semi-finals they were defeated by the Connecticut Sun in a three-game sweep.

In 2020, the season was delayed and shortened to 22 games in a bubble at IMG Academy due to the COVID-19 pandemic. Williams played 21 games with 4 starts, averaging career-highs in field goal shooting and three-point shooting percentages. The Sparks finished 15–7 as the number 3 seed with a bye to the second round elimination game but would once again lose to the Connecticut Sun.

In February 2021, Williams signed a one-year deal with the Las Vegas Aces.

== WNBA statistics ==
Legend
GP	Games played	GS	Games started	MPG	Minutes per game	RPG	Rebounds per game
APG	Assists per game	SPG	Steals per game	BPG	Blocks per game	PPG	Points per game
TO	Turnovers per game	FG%	Field-goal percentage	3P%	3-point field-goal percentage	FT%	Free-throw percentage
**Bold**	Career best	°	League leader

†	Denotes seasons in which Williams won a WNBA championship

=== Regular season ===
Year	Team	GP	GS	MPG	FG%	3P%	FT%	RPG	APG	SPG	BPG	TO	PPG
2012	Tulsa	**33**	3	20.3	.344	.325	.824	2.4	2.1	**1.6**	0.3	1.4	10.5
2013	Tulsa	27	6	22.7	.397	.381	.900	2.4	1.8	1.0	0.2	1.4	**15.6**
2014	Tulsa	11	2	15.8	.406	.222	**.933**	1.8	1.2	1.3	0.1	1.3	6.9
2015	Tulsa	29	20	**28.0**	.352	.346	.850	**3.4**	**2.6**	1.4	**0.5**	1.6	**15.6**
2017	Los Angeles	23	6	17.7	.321	.270	.864	1.4	0.7	0.8	0.1	1.1	6.4
2018	Los Angeles	**33**	3	16.5	.407	.375	.800	1.4	0.7	0.7	0.0	0.4	7.1
2019	Los Angeles	23	14	25.8	.384	.391	.880	2.6	1.6	1.1	0.3	1.2	12.5
2020	Los Angeles	21	4	21.1	.435	**.422**	.889	1.8	1.5	1.1	0.3	0.9	10.5
2021	Las Vegas	32	**32**	26.0	**.444**	.417	.920	2.6	1.6	0.8	0.3	0.7	10.5
2022^{†}	Las Vegas	21	0	18.0	.381	.366	.762	2.0	1.2	0.4	0.1	**0.3**	6.7
Career	10 years, 3 teams	253	90	21.6	.385	.367	.862	2.2	1.5	1.0	0.3	1.0	10.5

=== Playoffs ===
Year	Team	GP	GS	MPG	FG%	3P%	FT%	RPG	APG	SPG	BPG	TO	PPG
2015	Tulsa	1	0	15.6	.167	.000	.000	2.0	**1.0**	1.0	0.0	1.0	2.0
2017	Los Angeles	7	0	5.2	.267	**.375**	.667	0.1	0.1	0.2	0.0	**0.0**	1.9
2018	Los Angeles	2	2	24.9	.381	.250	**1.000**	2.0	0.5	**1.5**	**1.0**	1.5	10.5
2019	Los Angeles	4	4	23.9	.282	.227	.250	**3.0**	0.8	1.0	0.0	1.0	7.0
2020	Los Angeles	1	0	10.0	.250	.000	.000	1.0	0.0	1.0	0.0	1.0	2.0
2021	Las Vegas	5	**5**	**27.4**	**.551**	.345	**1.000**	1.6	1.0	1.2	0.4	0.6	**14.4**
2022^{†}	Las Vegas	**10**	0	20.3	.348	.358	**1.000**	2.7	**1.0**	0.8	0.2	0.4	6.9
Career	7 years, 3 teams	30	11	18.2	.374	.313	.789	1.8	0.7	0.8	0.2	0.5	6.9

== Overseas career ==
During the 2012-13 off-season, Williams played for Good Angels Košice in Slovakia and later in the off-season played for Hapoel Rishon Lezion in Israel. During the 2013-14 off-season, Williams played for Virtus Eirene Ragusa in Italy. In the 2015-16 off-season, Williams played in Dubai for the Al Nasr Sports Club, where she suffered an achilles injury that kept her from playing in the 2016 WNBA season. In July 2017, Williams signed with Reyer Venezia for the 2017-18 off-season.

=== Turkey ===
In 2019, Williams signed with Elazığ İl Özel İdarespor of the Turkish league for the 2019-20 off-season. In July 2020, Williams signed with OGM Ormanspor of the Turkish league for the 2020-21 off-season. On 21 May 2021, she signed a one-year contract with Galatasaray.

== Personal life ==
=== Legal issues ===
Williams was arrested on April 30, 2019 in Pahokee, Florida for assaulting her ex-girlfriend. According to the arrest report, Williams repeatedly struck Alkeria Davis in the head and pulled her hair after she forced her way into the home. Police spent 10 minutes trying to break up the fight that took place in December. Authorities said Williams grabbed a firearm, placed it on the trunk and pointed it at one man, saying "you'll get all 18" before speeding off, after the fight was broken up. On July 16, 2019, Williams was suspended by the WNBA for 10 games stemming from the incident. On July 25, 2023, Williams was arrested in Las Vegas on domestic violence and strangulation charges. She was subsequently barred from participating in team activities. In response to the arrest, The Aces issued a statement saying that she is “...precluded from participating in team activities. We condemn domestic violence of any kind. Our thoughts are with the parties involved in this situation.”
