= Theresa Plaisance =

American basketball player (born 1992)

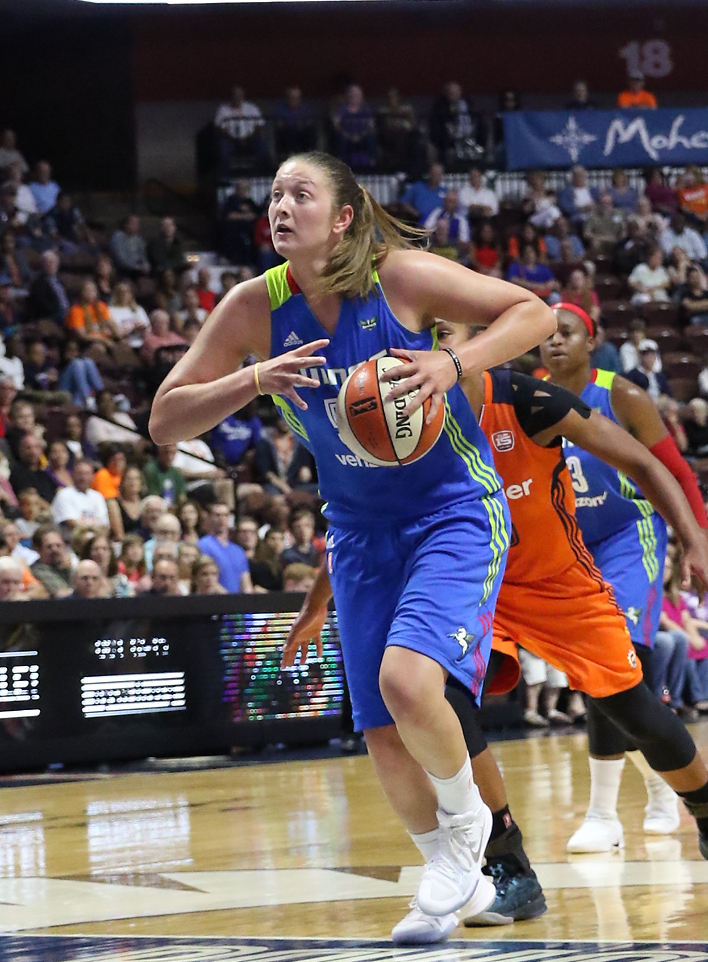

Personal information
- Born: May 18, 1992 (age 34) New Orleans, Louisiana, U.S.
- Listed height: 6 ft 5 in (1.96 m)
- Listed weight: 185 lb (84 kg)

Career information
- High school: Vandebilt Catholic (Houma, Louisiana)
- College: LSU (2010–2014)
- WNBA draft: 2014: 3rd round, 27th overall pick
- Drafted by: Tulsa Shock
- Playing career: 2014–present
- Position: Power forward

Career history
- 2014–2019: Tulsa Shock / Dallas Wings
- 2014–2018: Botaş Spor Adana
- 2018–2019: Shaanxi Red Wolves
- 2019–2020: Connecticut Sun
- 2021: Washington Mystics
- 2022: Las Vegas Aces
- 2023: Seattle Storm

Career highlights
- WNBA champion (2022); Commissioner’s Cup champion (2022); 2× First-team All-SEC (2013, 2014); SEC All-Defensive Team (2013); McDonald's All-American (2010)
- Stats at WNBA.com
- Stats at Basketball Reference
Medals
Women's Basketball
Representing United States
World University Games
Gold medal – first place	2013 Kazan	Team
FIBA Under-18 Americas Championship
Gold medal – first place	2010 United States	Team

Theresa Monique Plaisance (born May 18, 1992) is an American professional basketball player and comedian who last played for the Seattle Storm of the Women's National Basketball Association (WNBA).

== LSU statistics ==
Legend
GP	Games played	GS	Games started	MPG	Minutes per game
FG%	Field goal percentage	3P%	3-point field goal percentage	FT%	Free throw percentage
RPG	Rebounds per game	APG	Assists per game	SPG	Steals per game
BPG	Blocks per game	PPG	Points per game	**Bold**	Career high

Year	Team	GP	Points	FG%	3P%	FT%	RPG	APG	SPG	BPG	PPG
2010–11	LSU	21	44	**48.6%**	**35.3%**	28.6%	1.0	0.3	0.1	–	2.1
2011–12	LSU	**34**	152	42.3%	30.2%	62.2%	1.9	0.5	0.4	0.5	4.5
2012–13	LSU	**34**	**577**	43.7%	32.4%	72.8%	**8.3**	**1.6**	**1.1**	**2.5**	**17.0**
2013–14	LSU	**34**	520	42.4%	34.8%	**73.6%**	7.9	0.8	1.0	1.4	15.3
Career		123	1293	43.2%	33.0%	71.4%	5.2	0.9	0.7	1.2	10.5

== WNBA career statistics ==
Legend
GP	Games played	GS	Games started	MPG	Minutes per game	RPG	Rebounds per game
APG	Assists per game	SPG	Steals per game	BPG	Blocks per game	PPG	Points per game
TO	Turnovers per game	FG%	Field-goal percentage	3P%	3-point field-goal percentage	FT%	Free-throw percentage
**Bold**	Career best	°	League leader

†	Denotes seasons in which Plaisance won a WNBA championship

=== Regular season ===
Year	Team	GP	GS	MPG	FG%	3P%	FT%	RPG	APG	SPG	BPG	TO	PPG
2014	Tulsa	19	0	4.7	.150	.400	**1.000**	0.8	0.3	0.2	0.3	0.2	0.6
2015	Tulsa	25	1	8.2	.281	.320	.700	1.9	0.2	0.2	0.2	**0.1**	1.9
2016	Dallas	27	1	11.9	**.398**	.333	.636	2.5	0.3	0.3	0.4	0.7	4.0
2017	Dallas	**34**	**25**	**20.3**	.380	.344	.862	4.3	0.9	0.7	0.7	0.9	**7.7**
2018	Dallas	7	0	11.6	.389	**.474**	.000	3.7	0.7	0.3	0.3	1.1	5.3
2019	Dallas	22	12	17.2	.374	.343	.773	**4.4**	**1.5**	0.3	**0.8**	1.4	6.0
2019	Connecticut	9	0	7.1	.348	.333	**1.000**	1.8	0.0	0.3	0.2	**0.1**	2.4
2020	Connecticut	13	0	6.9	.379	.294	.833	1.0	0.1	0.4	0.2	0.2	2.5
2021	Washington	31	11	18.0	.351	.302	.815	**4.4**	1.4	**0.8**	0.7	1.2	6.4
2022^{†}	Las Vegas	31	2	12.9	.371	.348	.700	2.6	0.5	0.3	0.4	0.7	4.0
Career	9 years, 4 teams	218	52	13.2	.363	.337	.784	3.0	0.7	0.4	0.5	0.7	4.5

=== Playoffs ===
Year	Team	GP	GS	MPG	FG%	3P%	FT%	RPG	APG	SPG	BPG	TO	PPG
2015	Tulsa	2	0	3.5	.000	.000	.000	0.0	0.5	0.0	0.0	1.0	0.0
2017	Dallas	1	**1**	**24.0**	**.429**	.000	**1.000**	**5.0**	**3.0**	**1.0**	**1.0**	1.0	**7.0**
2019	Connecticut	3	0	2.0	.333	.200	.000	0.7	0.0	0.0	0.3	**0.0**	1.7
2020	Connecticut	3	0	4.0	.000	.000	.000	0.7	0.3	0.0	0.7	**0.0**	0.0
2022^{†}	Las Vegas	**4**	0	5.0	.400	**.333**	.000	1.3	0.5	0.3	0.5	0.3	1.3
Career	5 years, 3 teams	13	1	5.3	.318	.154	1.000	1.1	0.5	0.2	0.4	0.6	1.3

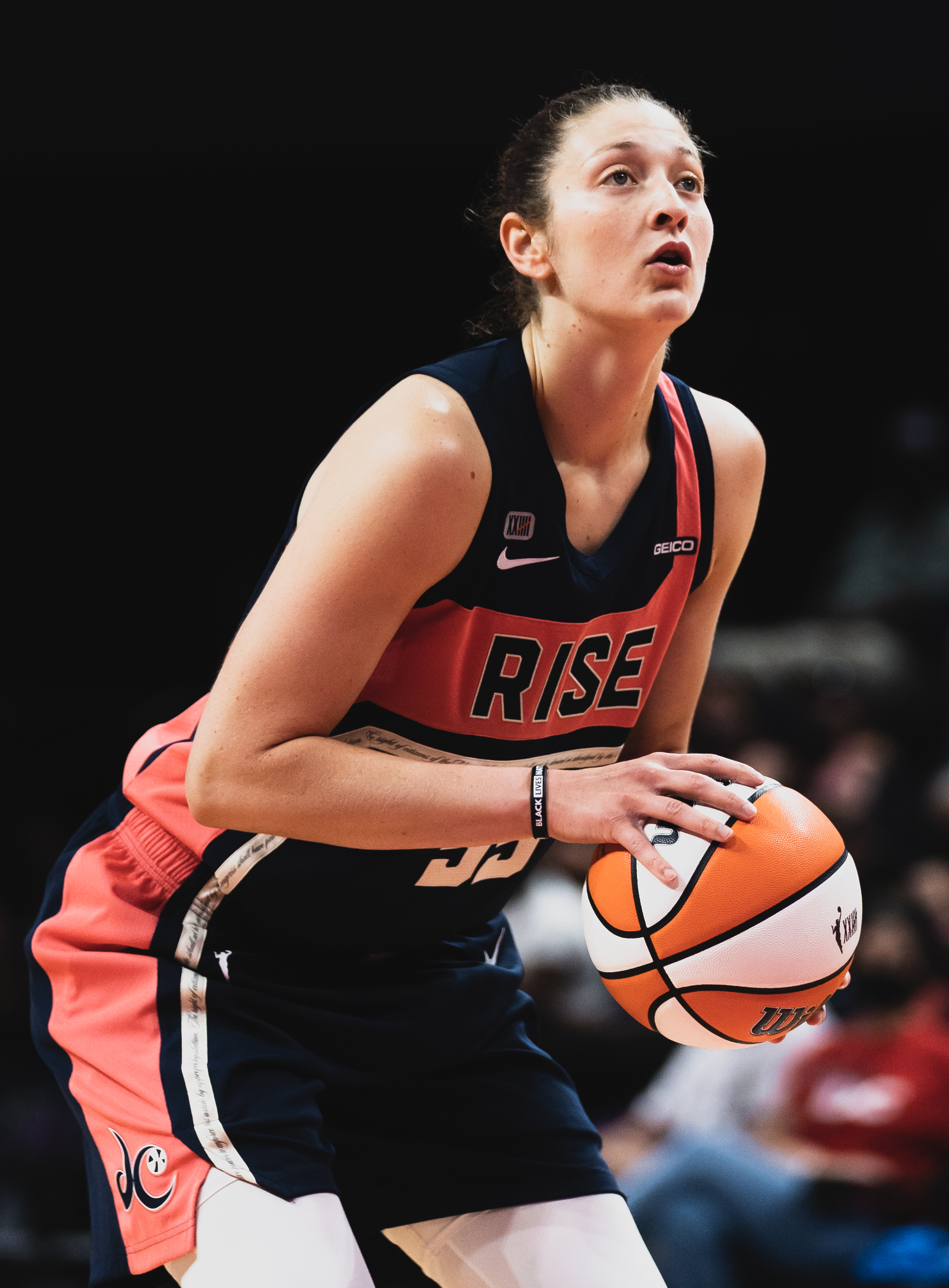
Plaisance with the Washington Mystics

== Personal life ==
Plaisance has a dog. Her mother is the former head coach of women's basketball at Nicholls State University in Thibodaux, Louisiana.

Alongside her former teammate Sydney Colson, Plaisance produced and starred in The Syd + TP show, an unscripted comedy co-produced by Ryan Reynolds in partnership with Fubo. In July 2025, Colson and Plaisance launched a podcast, "Unsupervised," with wide-ranging thoughts on basketball and popular culture.
