= Tyler Marsh =

American basketball coach (born 1987)

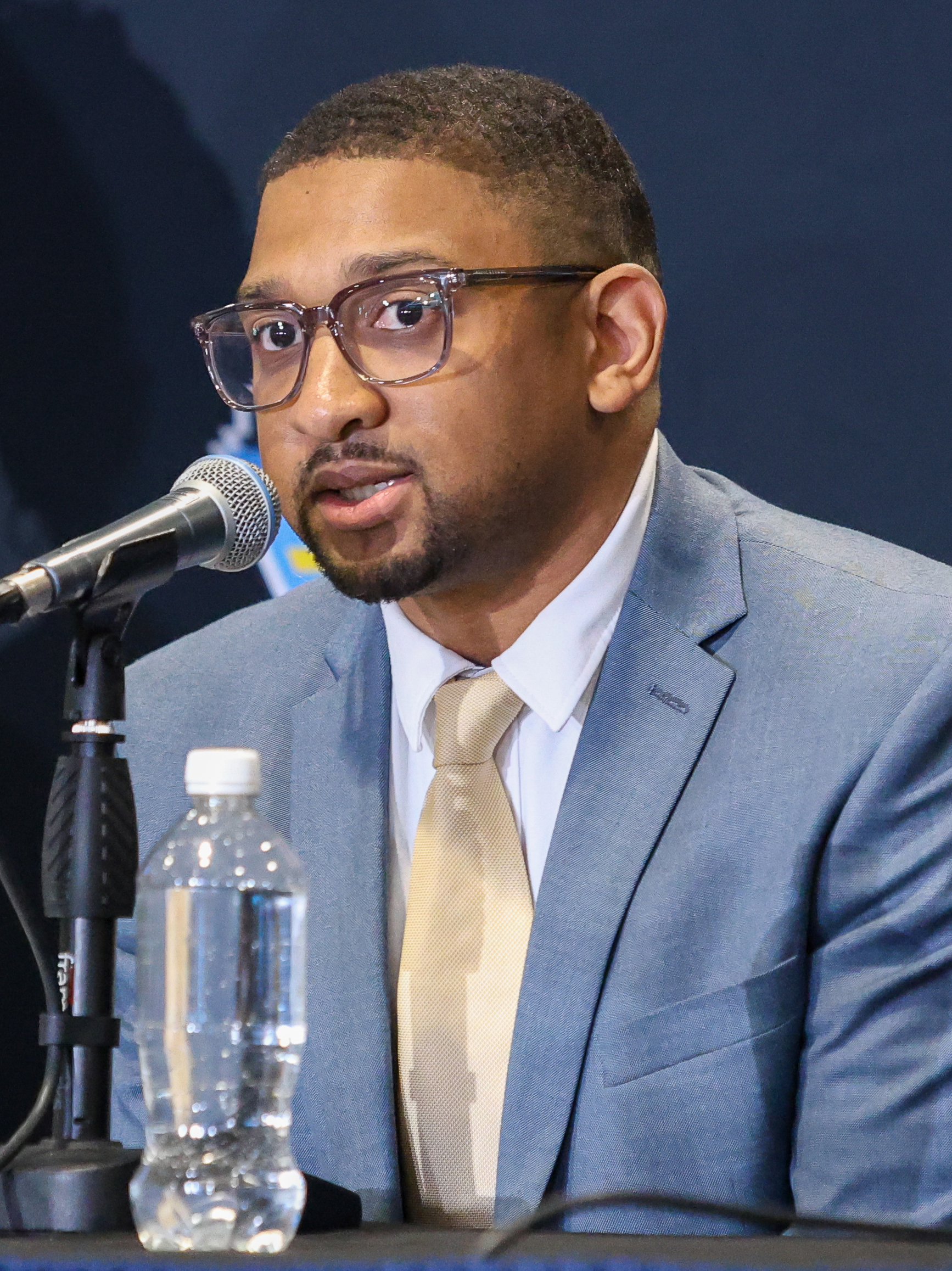
- Marsh introduction as Chicago Sky head coach, 2024

Chicago Sky
- Title: Head coach
- League: WNBA

Personal information
- Born: December 9, 1987 (age 38) Miami, Florida, U.S
- Listed height: 5 ft 10 in (1.78 m)
- Listed weight: 173 lb (78 kg)

Career information
- High school: Miami Christian School (Miami, Florida); Bridgton Academy (North Bridgton, Maine)
- College: UAB (2006–2008); Birmingham-Southern (2009–2010)
- Position: Guard
- Coaching career: 2012–present

Career history

Coaching
- 2012–2013: Rio Grande Valley Vipers (player development)
- 2013–2014: Iowa Energy (assistant)
- 2014–2015: Bakersfield Jam (assistant)
- 2016–2017: Fort Wayne Mad Ants (assistant)
- 2017–2018: Alabama A&M (assistant)
- 2018–2020: Toronto Raptors (player development coach)
- 2020–2022: Indiana Pacers (assistant)
- 2022–2024: Las Vegas Aces (assistant)
- 2025–present: Chicago Sky

Career highlights
- As assistant coach: NBA champion (2019); 2× WNBA champion (2022, 2023); WNBA Commissioner's Cup champion (2022); NBA D-League champion (2013)

Tyler Marsh (born December 9, 1987) is an American professional basketball coach and former player who is the head coach for the Chicago Sky of the Women's National Basketball Association (WNBA).

== Personal life ==
Marsh is the son of Donnie Marsh, who was the former head coach at FIU and Alabama A&M and is currently serving as an assistant coach for the Detroit Mercy Titans.

== Coaching career ==
Marsh started his coaching career in 2012 as a player development coach for the Rio Grande Valley Vipers under Nick Nurse for the 2012–2013 season. He went on to win a D-league championship with the Vipers in 2013.

Marsh served as an assistant coach of the Iowa Energy for the 2013-2014 D League season.

Marsh served as an assistant coach of the Bakersfield Jam for the 2014-2015 D League season.

Marsh served as an assistant coach of the Fort Wayne Mad Ants from 2016-2017.

Marsh was hired as an assistant video coordinator for the Toronto Raptors during the 2018-2019 NBA season, reuniting him with Nick Nurse. He went on to win the 2019 NBA Championship with the Raptors. He was promoted to player development coach for the 2019-2020 NBA season.

Marsh was hired as a player development coach and assistant coach for the Indiana Pacers for the 2020-2021 NBA season under Nate Bjorkgren and Rick Carlisle.

Marsh was hired by the Las Vegas Aces as an assistant coach to Becky Hammon on March 14, 2022. He went on to win two championships with the Aces in 2022 and 2023. He also won a commissioner's cup title in 2022.

On November 3, 2024, Marsh was hired as the head coach of the Chicago Sky, making his head coach debut in the WNBA.

== Head coaching record ==
=== WNBA ===
Legend
Regular season	G	Games coached	W	Games won	L	Games lost	W–L %	Win–loss %
Playoffs	PG	Playoff games	PW	Playoff wins	PL	Playoff losses	PW–L %	Playoff win–loss %

Team	Year	G	W	L	W–L%	Finish	PG	PW	PL	PW–L%	Result
CHI	2025	44	10	34	.227	6th in East	–	–	–	–	Missed Playoffs
CHI	2026	44	16	28	.364	5th in East	–	–	–	–	Missed Playoffs
Career		88	26	62	.295		–	–	–	–	
