= Kiah Stokes =

American basketball player (born 1993)

- Stokes with the Golden State Valkyries in 2026

No. 41 – Golden State Valkyries
- Position: Center
- League: WNBA

Personal information
- Born: March 30, 1993 (age 33) Cedar Rapids, Iowa, U.S.
- Listed height: 6 ft 3 in (1.91 m)
- Listed weight: 191 lb (87 kg)

Career information
- High school: Linn-Mar (Marion, Iowa)
- College: UConn (2011–2015)
- WNBA draft: 2015: 1st round, 11th overall pick
- Drafted by: New York Liberty
- Playing career: 2015–present

Career history
- 2015–2021: New York Liberty
- 2015–2016: Samsung Life Blueminx
- 2016–2017: Beşiktaş
- 2017–2018: Botaş
- 2018–2024: Fenerbahçe
- 2021–2025: Las Vegas Aces
- 2026–present: Golden State Valkyries

Career highlights
- 4× WNBA champion (2022, 2023, 2025, 2026); WNBA All-Rookie Team (2015); 2× WNBA All-Defensive Second Team (2015, 2026); Commissioner’s Cup champion (2022); EuroLeague champion (2023); FIBA Europe SuperCup Women winner (2023); Triple Crown (2024); 4× Turkish Super League champion (2019, 2021, 2022, 2023); 2× Turkish Cup champion (2019, 2020); Turkish Presidential Cup champion (2019); 3× NCAA champion (2013–2015); AAC Defensive Player of the Year (2015); Big East All-Rookie Team (2012); McDonald's All-American (2011); Iowa Miss Basketball (2011)
- Stats at WNBA.com
- Stats at Basketball Reference
Medals
Women's basketball
Representing the United States
FIBA Americas U16 Championship
Gold medal – first place	2009 Mexico	Team
Women's 3x3 basketball
Representing the United States
Youth Olympic Games
Gold medal – first place	2010 Singapore	Team

Kiah Irene Stokes (/ˈkiːə/ KEE-ə; born March 30, 1993) is an American professional basketball player for the Golden State Valkyries of the Women's National Basketball Association (WNBA). She was selected by the New York Liberty with the No. 11 pick in the first round of the 2015 WNBA draft.

Stokes played four years at the University of Connecticut where she was part of four consecutive Final Four teams and won three straight national championships, from 2013 to 2015. Stokes is a four-time WNBA champion, winning with the Aces in 2022, 2023, and 2025 and with the Valkyries in 2026. She also won the EuroLeague championship with Fenerbahçe in 2023.

Internationally, Stokes has played on the USA Basketball U16 National Team, where she helped the team win the FIBA Americas U16 Championship Gold Medal. She began playing for the Turkey women's national basketball team in 2019.

== Early life ==
Stokes is the daughter of Greg Stokes and Julie Saddler and has one brother, Darius. Her father was an all-American basketball player at the University of Iowa, played for the Philadelphia 76ers and won gold with the 1983 USA Pan American Games Team.

According to her father, when she was four years old, he signed her up for a YMCA track team which was designed for five and six-year-olds. Despite being younger than everyone else, she competed in the 60-yard dash and beat everyone by 20 yards, and he realized she might have athletic talent. Stokes played high school basketball at Linn-Mar High School in Marion, Iowa.

== College career ==
=== Freshman year ===
Stokes ended her freshman campaign averaging 4.5 points and 4.5 rebounds in her 13.4 minutes per game. Stokes was second on the team in blocks as she averaged 1.4 denials per game. She led the Huskies in blocks in 13 of 38 contests. Stokes shot 60 percent from the field and 65.3 percent from the free throw line. She was named to the All-BIG EAST Rookie Team along with teammate Kaleena Mosqueda-Lewis.

=== Sophomore year ===
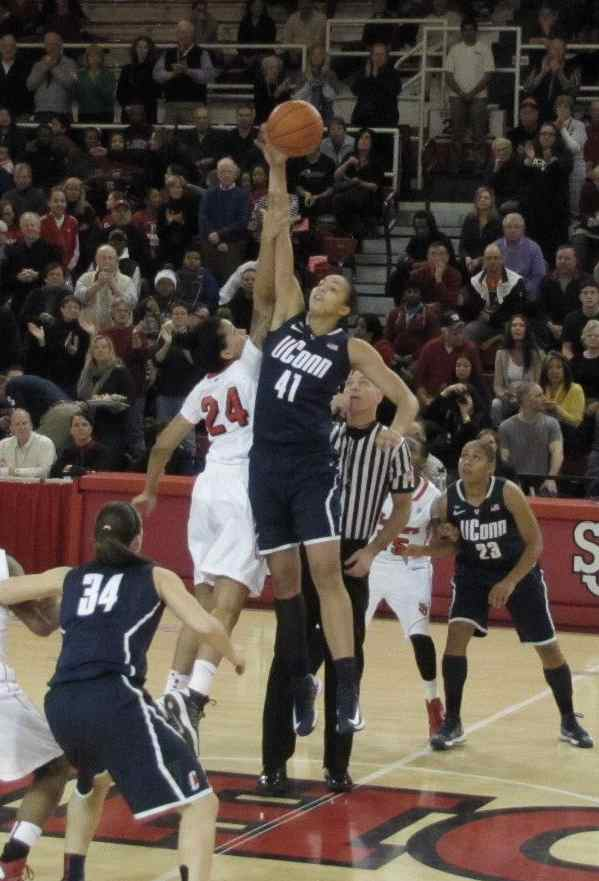
Kiah Stokes, in her first career start, soars to secure the tip-off in the game against St. Johns 2013

As a sophomore in 2012–13, aided Connecticut to a 35–4 record and the 2013 NCAA National Championship. Stokes saw time in 32 games, averaging 2.8 points and 3.5 rebounds in 10.7 minutes per contest. She was third on the team with 39 blocks, and as an efficient 35-53 from the field (.660) and dished-out 21 assists against 20 turnovers. Stokes recorded double-digit minutes in 17 games.

=== Junior year ===
Stokes helped lead her team to an undefeated 40–0 season and the 2014 National Championship. Stokes started two of 39 games and averaged 4.5 points and was third on the squad at 7.1 rebounds in only 18.5 minutes per contest. She recorded four double-doubles, after posting just one in her first two years, with double-digit rebounds on eight occasions. She had seven or more rebounds 21 times during the season.

== Professional career ==
=== WNBA ===
In her first two seasons, she averaged 58.8% in field goals, 65.4% in free throws, and 6.3 points per game.

Stokes has won four WNBA championships. Her first three were in 2022, 2023, and 2025 with the Las Vegas Aces. Her fourth championship was in 2026 with the Golden State Valkyries.

Stokes' podcast Hangtime on the Underdog Sports Podcast Network is the first podcast hosted by a WNBA player.

Stokes signed with the Golden State Valkyries in April 2026. She played a consistent starting role for the franchise through the 2026 season, after coming off the bench for the previous 5 seasons. Stokes recorded multiple key blocks to eliminate her former team, the Las Vegas Aces from the playoffs in the semifinals. Following a win on October 31st, 2026 over the Atlanta Dream in the 2026 WNBA Finals, she became the first player ever to win two consecutive titles with two different team (Aces in 2025 and Valkyries in 2026). Additionally, she set the record for the most blocks (19) in the WNBA Finals.

=== Outside the United States ===
Stokes first played overseas professionally in the WKBL in South Korea, where she played the 2015-2016 season for Samsung Life Blueminx. From 2016 through 2024, she played for three teams in Turkey: one season each for Beşiktaş and Botaş, followed by five seasons playing for Fenerbahçe. Stokes won the 2022–23 EuroLeague Women championship as a member of Fenerbahçe.

== National team career ==
=== U16 for the United States ===
Stokes was selected to be a member of the first ever U16 team for USA Basketball. The team competed in the first FIBA Americas U16 Championship For Women held in Mexico City, Mexico in August 2009. Stokes averaged 5.8 points and 3.3 rebounds per game. She helped the team to a 5–0 record and the gold medal at the competition. The win secured an automatic bid to the 2010 FIBA U17 World Championship.

=== Senior team and switch to Turkey ===
After her first year of playing professionally in Turkey, Stokes appeared for the Turkey women's national basketball team in the EuroBasket Women 2019 tournament, where they finished 14th. She played for Turkey again in the EuroBasket Women 2023 qualification; although they qualified for the tournament, Stokes was not on the final 12-person squad.

== Career statistics ==
Legend
GP	Games played	GS	Games started	MPG	Minutes per game	RPG	Rebounds per game
APG	Assists per game	SPG	Steals per game	BPG	Blocks per game	PPG	Points per game
TO	Turnovers per game	FG%	Field-goal percentage	3P%	3-point field-goal percentage	FT%	Free-throw percentage
**Bold**	Career best	°	League leader

*	Denotes seasons in which Stokes won an NCAA Championship
†	Denotes seasons in which Stokes won a WNBA championship

=== WNBA ===
==== Regular season ====
WNBA regular season statistics
Year	Team	GP	GS	MPG	FG%	3P%	FT%	RPG	APG	SPG	BPG	TO	PPG
2015	New York	34	6	25.4	.547	.000	.688	6.4	.8	**.7**	**2.0**	1.1	5.8
2016	New York	27	0	24.1	**.641**	—	.627	**7.4**	.7	**.7**	1.4	1.1	**6.9**
2017	New York	34	12	19.6	.531	.000	.796	6.3	.9	.4	1.1	1.2	4.8
2018	New York	30	4	14.2	.545	—	.533	4.5	.4	.4	.6	.7	3.1
2019	Did not play												
2020	New York	22°	22°	**27.3**	.372	.235	.571	6.7	1.2	.5	1.2	1.3	5.7
2021	New York	9	0	15.0	.545	**.500**	**1.000**	4.2	.6	.4	.7	.7	1.7
2021	Las Vegas	15	8	20.5	.588	—	.500	6.1	1.0	.4	.7	.5	1.5
2022^{†}	Las Vegas	31	4	15.4	.426	.208	.813	4.4	.6	.5	.8	.6	2.3
2023^{†}	Las Vegas	40°	22	19.8	.434	.185	.500	5.9	.6	**.7**	1.0	**.4**	2.2
2024	Las Vegas	39	29	18.4	.323	.225	.667	4.7	.7	.5	.8	**.4**	1.4
2025^{†}	Las Vegas	40	18	12.9	.353	.130	.625	3.6	.4	.4	.4	**.4**	1.1
2026^{†}	Golden State	**43**	**43**	22.3	.434	.290	.421	5.8	**1.3**	.6	1.7	.5	3.6
**Career**	11 years, 3 teams	364	168	19.5	.478	.231	.656	5.5	.8	.5	1.1	.7	3.3

==== Playoffs ====
WNBA playoff statistics
Year	Team	GP	GS	MPG	FG%	3P%	FT%	RPG	APG	SPG	BPG	TO	PPG
2015	New York	6	0	26.2	.472	—	.857	8.2	.0	.8	1.3	1.2	**6.7**
2016	New York	1	0	10.0	.333	—	.500	2.0	.0	**1.0**	.0	1.0	3.0
2017	New York	1	0	16.0	.333	—	—	3.0	.0	.0	1.0	**.0**	2.0
2021	Las Vegas	5	2	14.2	.400	—	.500	2.6	1.0	.4	.6	.4	1.0
2022^{†}	Las Vegas	10	10	25.9	.486	.200	**1.000**	7.2	.4	.6	.8	.8	3.7
2023^{†}	Las Vegas	8	8	26.1	**.563**	**.500**	**1.000**	7.9	**1.3**	**1.0**	.3	.8	2.8
2024	Las Vegas	4	3	13.8	.000	.000	—	4.8	.0	.0	.3	.8	.0
2025^{†}	Las Vegas	9	0	1.3	—	—	—	.1	.0	.0	.0	**.0**	.0
2026^{†}	Golden State	**13**	**13**	**28.5**	.511	.235	.750	**10.0**	1.2	.4	**2.4**	.9	4.2
**Career**	9 years, 3 teams	57	36	20.4	.486	.259	.789	6.2	.6	.5	.5	.9	2.9

=== College ===
NCAA statistics
Year	Team	GP	GS	MPG	FG%	3P%	FT%	RPG	APG	SPG	BPG	TO	PPG
2011–12	UConn	36	0	13.4	.602	—	.653	4.5	.5	**.5**	1.4	.8	**4.5**
2012–13*	UConn	32	1	10.7	**.660**	—	.600	3.5	.7	.1	1.2	**.6**	2.8
2013–14*	UConn	**39**	2	**18.5**	.600	—	.698	**7.1**	**.9**	.3	2.3	.9	**4.5**
2014–15*	UConn	**39**	**4**	18.3	.570	**.500**	**.750**	6.8	.8	**.5**	**3.8**	.8	**4.5**
**Career**		146	7	15.5	.599	.500	.680	5.6	.7	.4	2.2	.8	4.1

== Awards and honors ==
- Named to the 2009 Iowa Newspaper Association and Des Moines Register 4A All-State first team in 2009 and 2010.
- Selected to the 2009 all-state tournament team.
- Named to the Iowa Girls Coaches Association 2009 4A
- All-State first team.
- Honored as an all-metro first team selection in 2009.
- 2010—Parade Magazine All-America fourth team honors.
- 2010—Gatorade State Player of the Year.
- 2010—ESPN Rise.com All-America second team.
- Tabbed 2010 All-Mississippi Valley Conference first team in 2009 and 2010 and all-conference second team in 2008.
- 2015—First Team Senior CLASS Award All-American
- 2015—WNBA All-Rookie Team
- 2015—WNBA All-Defensive Second Team
- 2026—WNBA All-Defensive Second Team
