= Dearica Hamby =

American basketball player (born 1993)

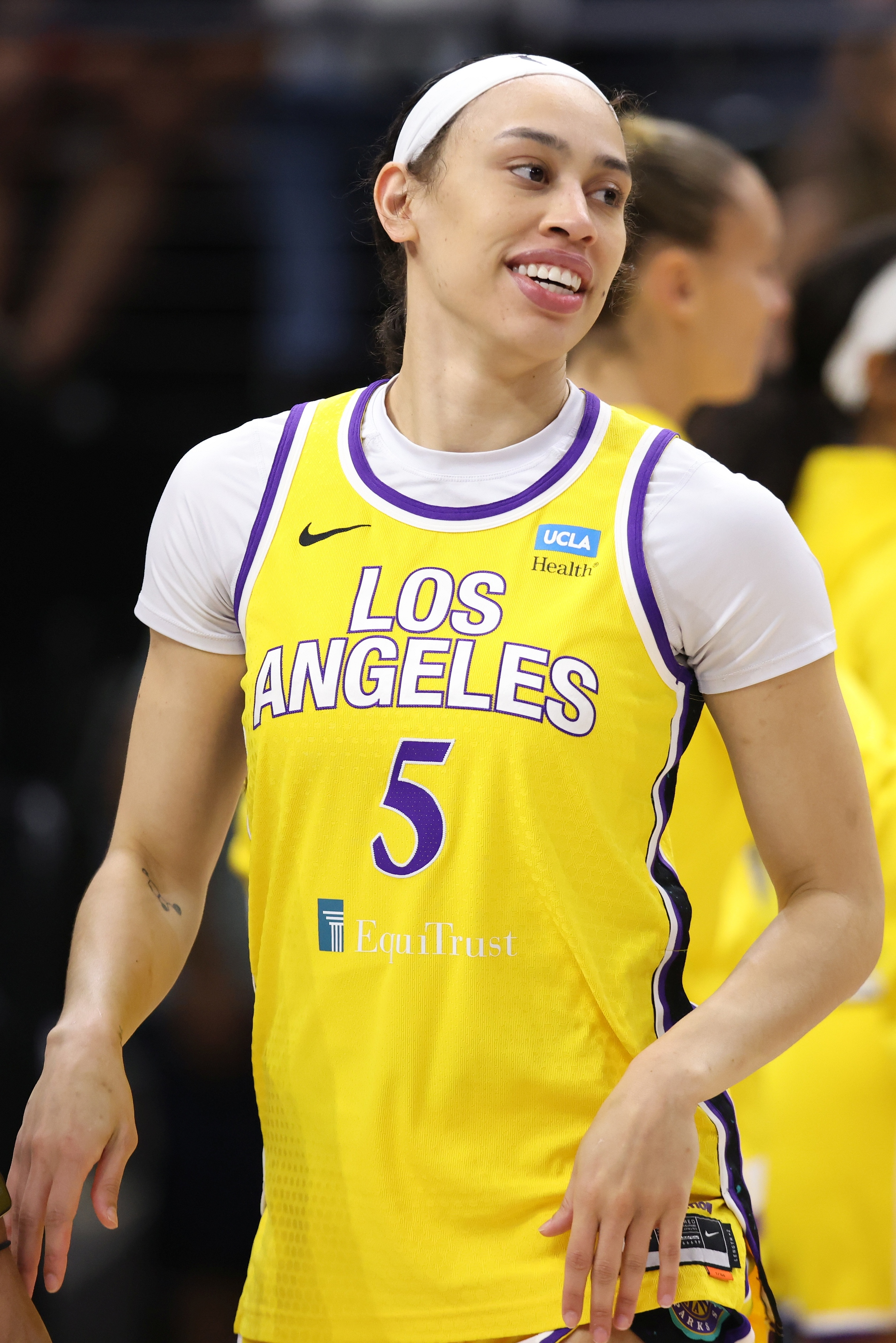
- Hamby with the Los Angeles Sparks in 2024

No. 5 – Los Angeles Sparks
- Position: Forward
- League: WNBA

Personal information
- Born: November 6, 1993 (age 33) Marietta, Georgia, U.S.
- Listed height: 6 ft 3 in (1.91 m)
- Listed weight: 189 lb (86 kg)

Career information
- High school: Marietta (Marietta, Georgia); Norcross (Norcross, Georgia)
- College: Wake Forest (2011–2015)
- WNBA draft: 2015: 1st round, 6th overall pick
- Drafted by: San Antonio Stars
- Playing career: 2015–present

Career history
- 2015–2022: San Antonio Stars / Las Vegas Aces
- 2015–2016: Cheongju KB Stars
- 2023–present: Los Angeles Sparks
- 2023: Beijing Great Wall
- 2024: Kayseri
- 2025–present: Vinyl

Career highlights
- WNBA champion (2022); 2× WNBA Sixth Woman of the Year (2019, 2020); 3× WNBA All-Star (2021, 2022, 2024); Commissioner's Cup champion (2022); Kim Perrot Sportsmanship Award (2024); FIBA 3x3 AmeriCup MVP (2023); 2× First-team All-ACC (2014, 2015)
- Stats at Basketball Reference
Medals
Women's 3x3 basketball
Representing the United States
Olympic Games
Bronze medal – third place	2024 Paris	Team
FIBA 3x3 AmeriCup
Gold medal – first place	2023 San Juan	Team

Dearica Marie Hamby (born November 6, 1993) is an American basketball player for the Los Angeles Sparks of the Women's National Basketball Association (WNBA) and for the Vinyl of Unrivaled.

== College career ==
During her senior year at Wake Forest, Hamby averaged 20.3 points, the highest scoring average in the Atlantic Coast Conference Women's and 10.7 rebounds, the second highest in the conference. During her junior season, she had one of the best single-seasons in school-history. In 31 games, Hamby led the nation's top conference in both scoring (22.0) and rebounding (11.0) She would become the first Demon Deacon to lead the ACC in both categories in the same season. Hamby finished as Wake Forest's all-time leading scorer and rebounder, with 1,801 points and 1,021 rebounds.

== Professional career ==
=== WNBA ===
==== San Antonio Stars / Las Vegas Aces (2015–2022) ====
Drafted sixth overall in 2015, Hamby played for the San Antonio Stars, which became the Las Vegas Aces in 2018.

In 2019, Hamby shot an average of 11 points, 7.6 rebounds, 1.9 assists and 0.97 steals per game and she tied the WNBA record for the most double-doubles by a reserve off the bench with five. Hamby was voted WNBA Sixth Woman of the Year in 2019, almost unanimously (41 of 43 votes). On the same day she received this award, in the second round, single-elimination 2019 WNBA Playoffs game against the Chicago Sky, with 6.5 seconds remaining and her team behind 92–90, Hamby made what the WNBA website termed "the shot of the year". Hamby stole a pass from Courtney Vandersloot intended for Diamond DeShields, dribbled once past half court, and threw in the game-winning basket, securing the win for the Aces.

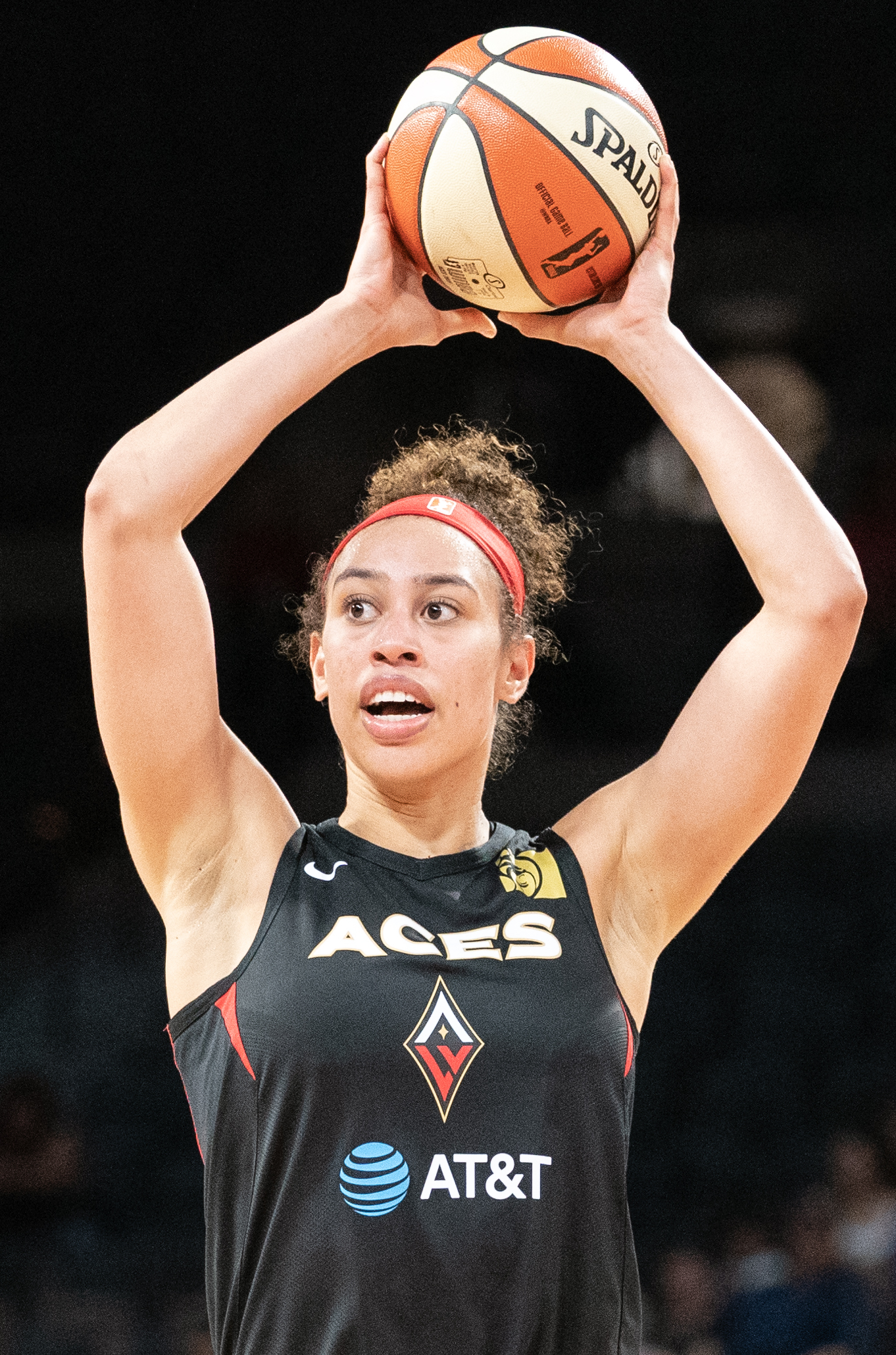
Hamby with the Las Vegas Aces in 2019

On September 20, 2020, Hamby was named Sixth Woman of the Year for the second year in a row.

Hamby signed a multi-year contract extension with the Aces on June 29, 2022. Hamby, and the Aces, won the 2022 WNBA Championship.

==== Los Angeles Sparks (2023–present) ====
On January 21, 2023 Hamby was traded to the Los Angeles Sparks alongside a 2024 WNBA draft first-round pick in exchange for the rights of Amanda Zahui B. and a 2024 WNBA draft 2nd round pick. On June 13, 2024, Hamby signed a one-year contract extension with the Sparks.

=== Unrivaled ===
On August 12, 2024, it was announced that Hamby would appear and play in the inaugural season of Unrivaled, a new women's 3-on-3 basketball league founded by Napheesa Collier and Breanna Stewart.

== National team career ==
Hamby played for USA Basketball for the first time at the national team training camp in 2022. She played on the women's 2022 USA World Cup Qualifying Team. In December 2023, she played on the 3x3 team for the first time, and they won the gold medal at the AmeriCup. Hamby made the tie-breaking shot to win. She was named the tournament MVP. Hamby was named, as a replacement for the injured Cameron Brink, to the United States 3x3 team for the 2024 Summer Olympics. Hamby and the US team won bronze medals.

== Career statistics ==
Legend
GP	Games played	GS	Games started	MPG	Minutes per game	RPG	Rebounds per game
APG	Assists per game	SPG	Steals per game	BPG	Blocks per game	PPG	Points per game
TO	Turnovers per game	FG%	Field-goal percentage	3P%	3-point field-goal percentage	FT%	Free-throw percentage
**Bold**	Career best	°	League leader

†	Denotes seasons in which Hamby won a WNBA championship

=== WNBA ===
==== Regular season ====
WNBA regular season statistics
Year	Team	GP	GS	MPG	FG%	3P%	FT%	RPG	APG	SPG	BPG	TO	PPG
2015	San Antonio	31	16	17.4	.354	.353	.642	4.1	.7	.4	.2	1.3	6.1
2016	San Antonio	25	25	25.3	.422	.143	.723	5.1	1.0	.5	**.5**	1.6	9.0
2017	San Antonio	34	3	20.2	.457	.375	.608	4.2	1.0	.9	.3	1.4	7.8
2018	Las Vegas	33	0	14.4	.526	.289	**.742**	3.6	1.2	.7	.3	**1.1**	7.4
2019	Las Vegas	34	9	24.8	.488	.321	.718	7.6	1.9	1.0	.4	1.8	11.0
2020	Las Vegas	22	0	28.3	.539	**.474**	.716	7.1	2.7	**1.7**	.2	2.0	13.0
2021	Las Vegas	23	0	25.1	.531	.226	.673	7.0	1.8	1.0	.1	1.5	11.3
2022^{†}	Las Vegas	34	32	26.5	.466	.219	.720	7.1	1.1	1.1	.1	1.5	9.3
2023	Los Angeles	40	19	24.8	.431	.220	.648	5.9	1.8	.9	.3	1.5	8.9
2024	Los Angeles	40	40	**33.7**	.512	.341	.631	**9.2**	**3.5**	**1.7**	.2	3.0	17.3
2025	Los Angeles	**44**	**44**	31.2	**.572**	.278	.627	7.9	3.3	1.6	**.5**	2.7	**18.4**
2026	Los Angeles	42	42	28.7	.552	.231	.687	7.0	2.4	1.5	.4	1.9	14.5
**Career**	12 years, 2 teams	408	230	25.3	.502	.291	.666	6.4	1.9	1.1	.3	1.8	11.5
**Career**	All-Star	3	0	8.7	.357	.667	.000	4.3	1.0	.3	.0	1.0	4.0

==== Playoffs ====
WNBA playoff statistics
Year	Team	GP	GS	MPG	FG%	3P%	FT%	RPG	APG	SPG	BPG	TO	PPG
2019	Las Vegas	5	0	**28.4**	.556	**.462**	.400	**7.0**	**3.0**	**.8**	.0	1.6	**12.0**
2020	Las Vegas	3	0	25.0	.529	.200	**.625**	3.0	2.3	.7	.0	2.7	8.0
2021	Las Vegas	5	0	17.4	.292	.000	.500	4.8	1.0	.4	**.2**	**.4**	3.8
2022^{†}	Las Vegas	**6**	0	8.5	**.600**	.000	.250	1.5	.8	.2	**.2**	.7	1.2
**Career**	4 years, 1 team	19	0	18.7	.484	.292	.469	4.1	1.7	.5	.1	1.2	5.8

=== College ===
NCAA statistics
Year	Team	GP	GS	MPG	FG%	3P%	FT%	RPG	APG	SPG	BPG	TO	PPG
2011–12	Wake Forest	**34**	13	16.6	.397	.250	.447	4.1	.4	1.2	.6	**1.3**	3.8
2012–13	Wake Forest	32	30	28.2	.542	.250	.620	6.2	.9	1.8	**1.1**	2.0	10.6
2013–14	Wake Forest	31	30	35.4	**.552**	**.268**	.676	**11.0**	2.0	**2.1**	**1.1**	4.2	**22.0**
2014–15	Wake Forest	31	**31**	**35.7**	.507	.262	**.708**	10.5	**2.4**	1.6	.6	4.1	20.1
**Career**		128	104	28.7	.519	.260	.664	7.9	1.4	1.7	.8	2.8	13.9

== Off the court ==
=== Personal life ===
Hamby and her husband welcomed their daughter, Amaya, in February 2017. In September 2022 at the Las Vegas Aces Championship parade, Hamby announced she was expecting her second child. Dearica Hamby announced the birth of her second child, Legend Maree Scandrick, on her Instagram account in March 2023.

=== Federal discrimination complaint ===
In September 2023, Hamby filed a federal discrimination complaint against the WNBA and the Las Vegas Aces, claiming the Aces traded her because she was pregnant and that the league did not adequately investigate.

== See also ==
- List of WNBA career rebounding leaders
