= Charlene Thomas-Swinson =

American basketball player and coach

Las Vegas Aces
- Position: Assistant coach
- League: WNBA

Personal information
- Born: December 11, 1965 (age 60) Takoma Park, Maryland, U.S.

Career information
- College: Auburn (1983–1987)
- Coaching career: 1989–present

Career history

Coaching
- 1989–1992: Columbia Union College (assistant)
- 1992–1996: Auburn (assistant)
- 1996–1999: St. John's
- 1999–2002: Orlando Miracle (assistant)
- 2002–2005: Florida (assistant)
- 2005–2011: Tulsa
- 2012–2014: Indiana (assistant)
- 2015–2021: LSU (assistant)
- 2022–present: Las Vegas Aces (assistant)

Career highlights
- C-USA women's basketball tournament title (2006); C-USA regular season title (2006); C-USA Coach of the Year (2006); As assistant coach: 2× WNBA champion (2022, 2023)

Charlene Thomas-Swinson (born December 11, 1965) is an assistant coach for Las Vegas Aces.

== Career ==
From 2005 to 2011, Thomas-Swinson was the head women's basketball coach at Tulsa. Her overall record as a head coach was 61–86 over five seasons. The 2006 team earned the Conference USA championship, and an NCAA tournament appearance, where they upset fifth seeded NC State in the first round. That year, Thomas-Swinson earned conference coach of the year honors.

Thomas-Swinson previously served as an assistant coach at Indiana, Auburn, and Florida. From 1999 to 2002, she served as an assistant coach in the WNBA, for the Orlando Miracle. From 1996 to 1999, she was the head coach at St. John's.

Thomas-Swinson was a college basketball player at Auburn. The Tigers posted a 99–24 mark, with her as a player. She led the team to its first regular season SEC title in 1987. Auburn won the tournament title, and advanced to the elite eight during her junior season.

Thomas-Swinson was born in Takoma Park, Maryland. In 2021, she was inducted into the Montgomery County, Maryland Sports Hall of Fame.

== Auburn statistics ==
Legend
GP	Games played	GS	Games started	MPG	Minutes per game
FG%	Field goal percentage	3P%	3-point field goal percentage	FT%	Free throw percentage
RPG	Rebounds per game	APG	Assists per game	SPG	Steals per game
BPG	Blocks per game	PPG	Points per game	**Bold**	Career high

Year	Team	GP	Points	FG%	FT%	RPG	APG	SPG	BPG	PPG
1983–84	Auburn	29	197	52.0%	52.5%	4.7	0.6	1.0	0.0	6.8
1984–85	Auburn	31	**307**	50.3%	**61.8%**	**7.4**	0.8	1.5	**0.8**	**9.9**
1985–86	Auburn	30	228	48.3%	57.6%	6.7	0.9	**1.6**	0.3	7.6
1986–87	Auburn	**33**	231	**56.6%**	59.3%	5.9	**1.2**	1.4	0.6	7.0
TOTAL	Auburn	123	963	53.6%	56.8%	6.2	0.9	1.4	0.4	7.8

== Head coaching record ==
Record table
Season	Team	Overall	Conference	Standing	Postseason
**St. John's Red Storm** (Big East Conference) (1996–1999)
1996–97	St. John's	5–22			
1997–98	St. John's	6–21			
1997–98	St. John's	13–18			
St. John's:		24–61 (.282)			
**Tulsa Golden Hurricane** (Conference USA) (2005–2011)
2005–06	Tulsa	26–6	13–3	1st	NCAA Second Round
2006–07	Tulsa	11–19	5–11	9th	
2007–08	Tulsa	11–20	6–10	T–9th	
2008–09	Tulsa	7–22	3–13	11th	
2009–10	Tulsa	12–16	6–10	T–9th	
2010–11	Tulsa	5–20	1–15	12th	
Tulsa:		72–103 (.411)			
Total:		96–164 (.369)			
National champion Postseason invitational champion Conference regular season champion Conference regular season and conference tournament champion Division regular season champion Division regular season and conference tournament champion Conference tournament champion
