= List of WNBA post-season records =

This article lists all-time records achieved in the WNBA post-season in major categories recognized by the league, including those set by teams and individuals in single games, series, and careers.

== Playoff records ==
- Largest comeback, playoffs:

- 22 by Indiana Fever vs Connecticut Sun in 2007

- Largest margin of victory, playoffs

- 38 by Chicago Sky (100) vs New York Liberty (62) on August 20, 2022

- Most points in a game, playoffs:

- 45 by Arike Ogunbowale vs Golden State Valkyries on Sept. 30, 2026

- Most rebounds in a game, playoffs:

- Cheryl Ford (23) vs the Connecticut Sun in Game 1 of the Eastern Conference finals on August 24, 2006

- Most assists in a game, playoffs:

- 18 by Courtney Vandersloot in the semifinals vs the Connecticut Sun on September 28, 2021

- Consecutive 30+ point games:

- 3 by A'ja Wilson in 2023

- Youngest to score 30+ points:

- 36 points by Rhyne Howard vs Dallas Wings on September 15, 2023

- Most points by player in first quarter:

- 19 by Rhyne Howard vs Dallas Wings on September 15, 2023

- Most points by player in a quarter:

- 21 by Jackie Young in 3rd quarter vs Phoenix Mercury on October 4, 2025

- Only player to record 15 points, 15 rebounds, 5 assists and 5 blocks

- Candace Parker posted 19 points, 18 rebounds, 5 assists, 6 blocks and 4 steals vs Connecticut Sun in August 2022

- Most blocks in a quarter, game

- 5 – Brittney Griner, Phoenix vs. Chicago, September 7, 2014

- Most consecutive playoff appearances:

- 11, Minnesota (2011–2021)

=== Individual career records ===
- Most career games played, playoffs:

- DeWanna Bonner (110)

- Most career points, playoffs:

- Diana Taurasi (1,486)

- Most career assists, playoffs:

- Chelsea Gray (423)

- Most career steals, playoffs:

- Tamika Catchings (152)

- Most career offensive rebounds, playoffs:

- Rebekkah Brunson (186)

- Most career defensive rebounds, playoffs:

- DeWanna Bonner (600)

- Most career total rebounds, playoffs:

- DeWanna Bonner (715)

- Most career blocks, playoffs:

- Lisa Leslie and A'ja Wilson (132)

- Most career personal fouls, playoffs:

- Diana Taurasi (247)

- Most career field goals made, playoffs:

- A'ja Wilson (494)

- Most career field goals attempted, playoffs:

- DeWanna Bonner (1,195)

- Most career 3-point made, playoffs:

- Diana Taurasi (217)

- Most career 3-point attempts, playoffs:

- Diana Taurasi (580)

- Most career free throws made, playoffs:

- Tamika Catchings (356)

- Most career free throws attempted, playoffs:

- Tamika Catchings (417)

- Most career turnovers, playoffs:

- Diana Taurasi (202)

- Highest average points per game, playoffs:

- Sonia Citron (25.0)

- Highest average assists per game, playoffs:

- Caitlin Clark (9.2)

- Highest average steals per game, playoffs:

- Rhyne Howard (2.5)

- Highest average total offensive rebounds per game, playoffs:

- Kiki Iriafen (6.5)

- Highest average total defensive rebounds per game, playoffs:

- Kiki Iriafen (8.5)

- Highest average total rebounds per game, playoffs:

- Kiki Iriafen (15.0)

- Highest average blocks per game, playoffs:

- Lisa Leslie and Margo Dydek (2.5)

- Highest average personal fouls per game, playoffs:

- Brittany Boyd-Jones (5.0)

- Highest average field goals made per game, playoffs:

- Napheesa Collier (8.1)

- Highest average field goals attempted per game, playoffs:

- Caitlin Clark (18.6)

- Highest field goal percentage, playoffs:

- Tied by 23 players (100.0%)

- Highest average 3-point field goals made per game, playoffs:

- Caitlin Clark (3.2)

- Highest average 3-point field goals attempted per game, playoffs:

- Caitlin Clark (11.6)

- Highest 3-point field goal percentage, playoffs:

- Tied by 20 players (100.0%)

- Highest average free throws made per game, playoffs:

- Sonia Citron (8.5)

- Highest average free throws attempted per game, playoffs:

- Sonia Citron (10.0)

- Highest free throw percentage, playoffs:

- Tied by 82 players (100.0%)

- Highest average turnovers per game, playoffs:

- Caitlin Clark (4.4)

== Finals records ==
- Largest comeback, finals:

- 18 by New York Liberty in 1999

- Most points in a game, finals:

- 38 by Angel McCoughtry vs Minnesota Lynx on Oct. 5, 2011

- Most career points, finals:

- 441 by Maya Moore (2011-17)

- Most assists in a game, finals

- 16 by Sue Bird vs the Las Vegas Aces in October 2020

- Most combined team points in game, finals:

- 236 by Phoenix Mercury (120) and Indiana Fever (116) in 2009 Game 1 (OT; also record for all WNBA games)

- Most combined team points in first half, finals:

- 109 by Phoenix Mercury (56) and Indiana Fever (53) in 2009 Game 1

== See also ==
- List of NBA post-season records
- List of WNBA regular season records
- List of WNBA franchise post-season streaks
