= List of WNBA career playoff assists leaders =

This article provides one list:

A list of Women's National Basketball Association (WNBA) players by total career Playoffs assists recorded.

== Playoff assist leaders ==
This is a list of Women's National Basketball Association players by total career Playoffs assists recorded.

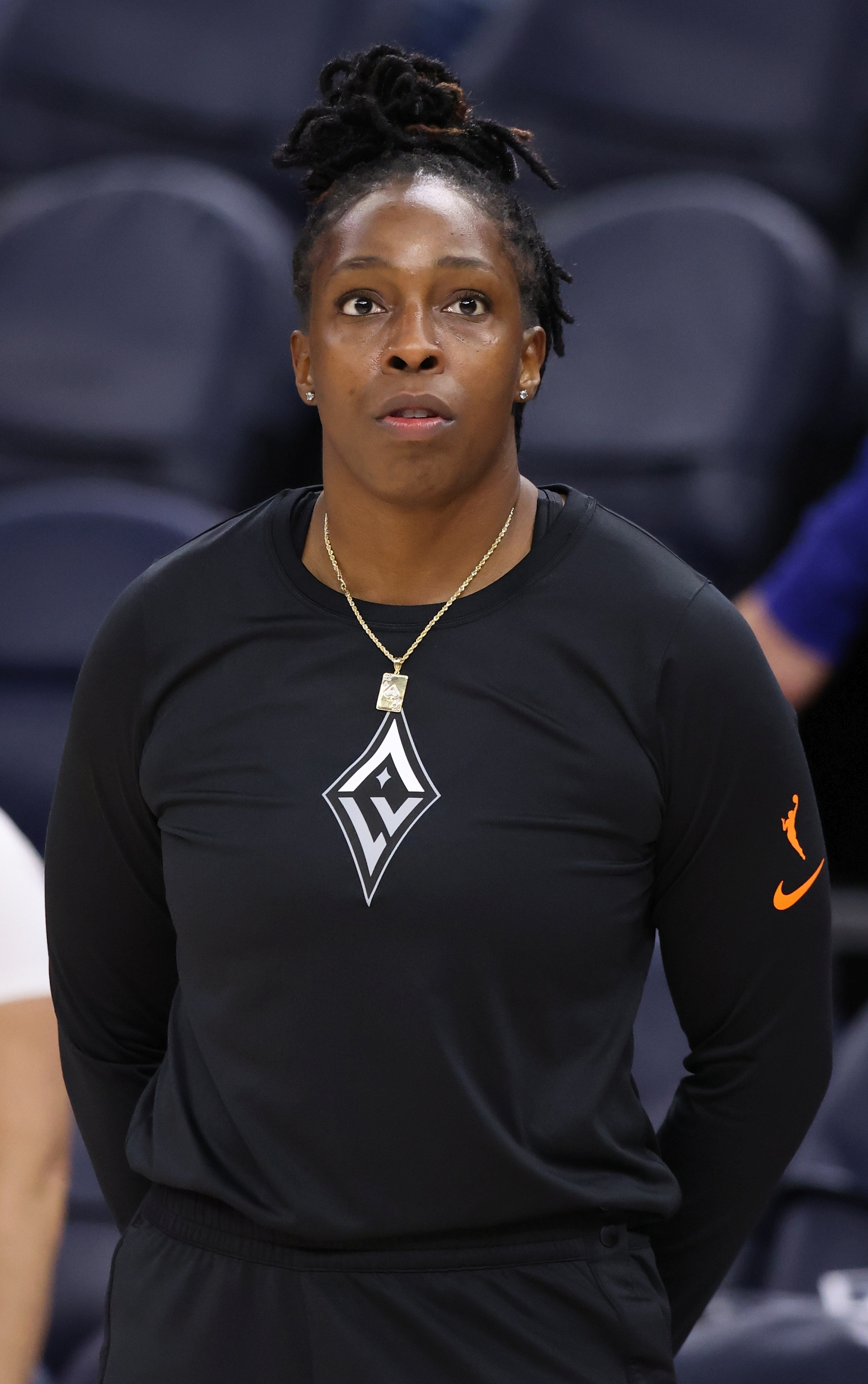
Chelsea Gray has the most assists in WNBA playoffs history.

^	Active WNBA player
*	Inducted into the Naismith Memorial Basketball Hall of Fame
†	Not yet eligible for Hall of Fame consideration
§	Eligible for Hall of Fame in 2026

Statistics accurate as of the 2026 WNBA Finals.

Rank	Player	Position(s)	Team(s) played for (years)	Total blocks	Games played	Assists per game average
1	Chelsea Gray^	Point guard	Connecticut Sun (2015); Los Angeles Sparks (2016–2020); Las Vegas Aces (2021–present)	423	71	6.0
2	Alyssa Thomas^	Power forward	Connecticut Sun (2014–2024); Phoenix Mercury (2025–present)	410	58	7.1
3	Courtney Vandersloot^	Point guard	Chicago Sky (2011–2022, 2025–present); New York Liberty (2023–2024)	390	61	6.4
4	Sue Bird*	Point guard	Seattle Storm (2002–2022)	364	60	6.1
5	Lindsay Whalen*	Point guard	Connecticut Sun (2004–2009); Minnesota Lynx (2010–2018)	341	82	4.1
6	Diana Taurasi^{†}	Shooting guard / point guard	Phoenix Mercury (2004–2024) (Note: Taurasi did not play the 2015 season at the request of her Russian Premier League team, UMMC Ekaterinburg.)	296	73	4.1
7	Candace Parker*	Power forward	Los Angeles Sparks (2008–2020); Chicago Sky (2021–2022); Las Vegas Aces (2023)	251	66	3.8
8	Briann January	Point guard	Indiana Fever (2009–2017); Phoenix Mercury (2018–2019); Connecticut Sun (2020–2021); Seattle Storm (2022)	242	68	3.6
9	Tamika Catchings*	Small forward	Indiana Fever (2002–2016)	223	68	3.3
10	Jackie Young^	Shooting guard	Las Vegas Aces (2019–present)	242	61	4.0

== See also ==
- Basketball statistics
- List of WNBA post-season records
- List of WNBA career assists leaders
