= List of WNBA career playoff steals leaders =

This article provides one lists:

A list of Women's National Basketball Association players by total career Playoffs steals recorded.

== Playoff steals leaders ==
This is a list of Women's National Basketball Association players by total career Playoffs steals recorded.

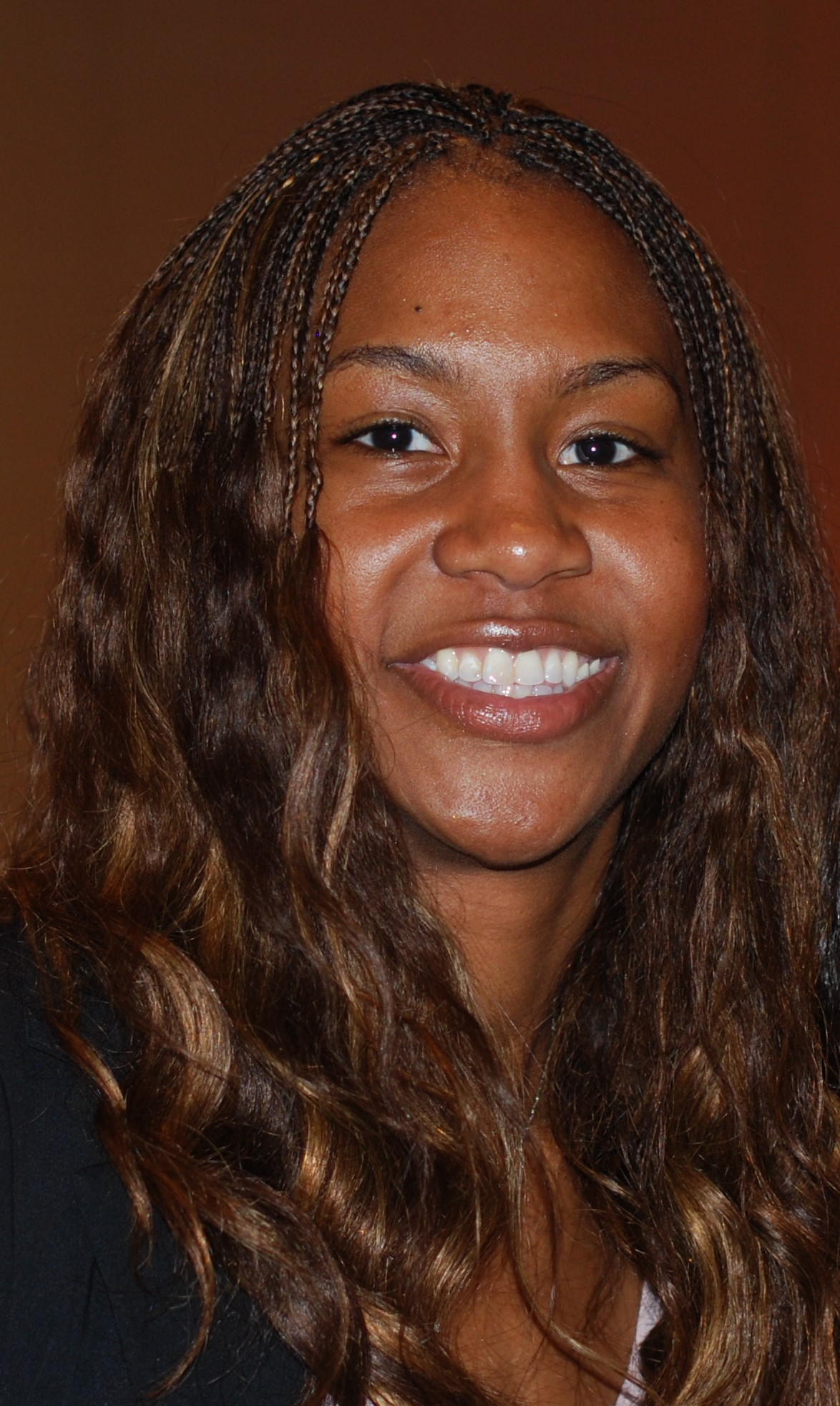
Tamika Catchings has the most steals in WNBA playoffs history.

Statistics accurate as of the 2026 WNBA Finals.

^	Active WNBA player
*	Inducted into a Naismith Memorial Basketball Hall of Fame
†	Not yet eligible for Hall of Fame consideration
§	1st time eligible for Hall of Fame in 2025

Rank	Player	Position(s)	Team(s) played for (years)	Total steals	Games played	Steals per game average
1	Tamika Catchings*	Small forward	Indiana Fever (2002–2016)	152	68	2.2
2	DeWanna Bonner^	Shooting guard / small forward	Phoenix Mercury (2009–2019, 2025); Connecticut Sun (2020–2024); Indiana Fever (2025); Phoenix Mercury (2025–2026); Atlanta Dream (2026)–present)	126	110	1.1
3	Candace Parker*	Power forward	Los Angeles Sparks (2008–2020); Chicago Sky (2021–2022); Las Vegas Aces (2023)	108	66	1.6
4	Maya Moore*	Power forward	Minnesota Lynx (2011–2018)	96	56	1.7
5	Alyssa Thomas^	Power forward	Connecticut Sun (2014–2024); Phoenix Mercury (2025–present)	95	58	1.6
6	Chelsea Gray^	Point guard	Connecticut Sun (2015); Los Angeles Sparks (2016–2020); Las Vegas Aces (2021–present)	94	71	1.3
7	Angel McCoughtry	Small forward / shooting guard	Atlanta Dream (2009–2019) (Note: McCoughtry sat out during 2017 to rest.); Las Vegas Aces (2020–2021); Minnesota Lynx (2022)	85	41	2.1
8	A'ja Wilson^	Center	Las Vegas Aces (2018–present)	74	61	1.2
9	DeLisha Milton-Jones	Small forward / power forward	Los Angeles Sparks (1999–2004, 2008–2012); Washington Mystics (2005–2007); San Antonio Silver Stars (2013); New York Liberty (2013–2014); Atlanta Dream (2014–2015)	73	50	1.5
10	Courtney Vandersloot^	Point guard	Chicago Sky (2011–2022, 2025–present); New York Liberty (2023–2024)	72	61	1.2

== See also ==
- Basketball statistics
- List of WNBA post-season records
- List of WNBA career steals leaders
