= List of WNBA career playoff blocks leaders =

This article provides one lists:

A list of Women's National Basketball Association players by total career Playoffs blocked shots recorded.

== Playoff blocked shots leaders ==
This is a list of Women's National Basketball Association players by total career Playoffs leaders in blocking shots.

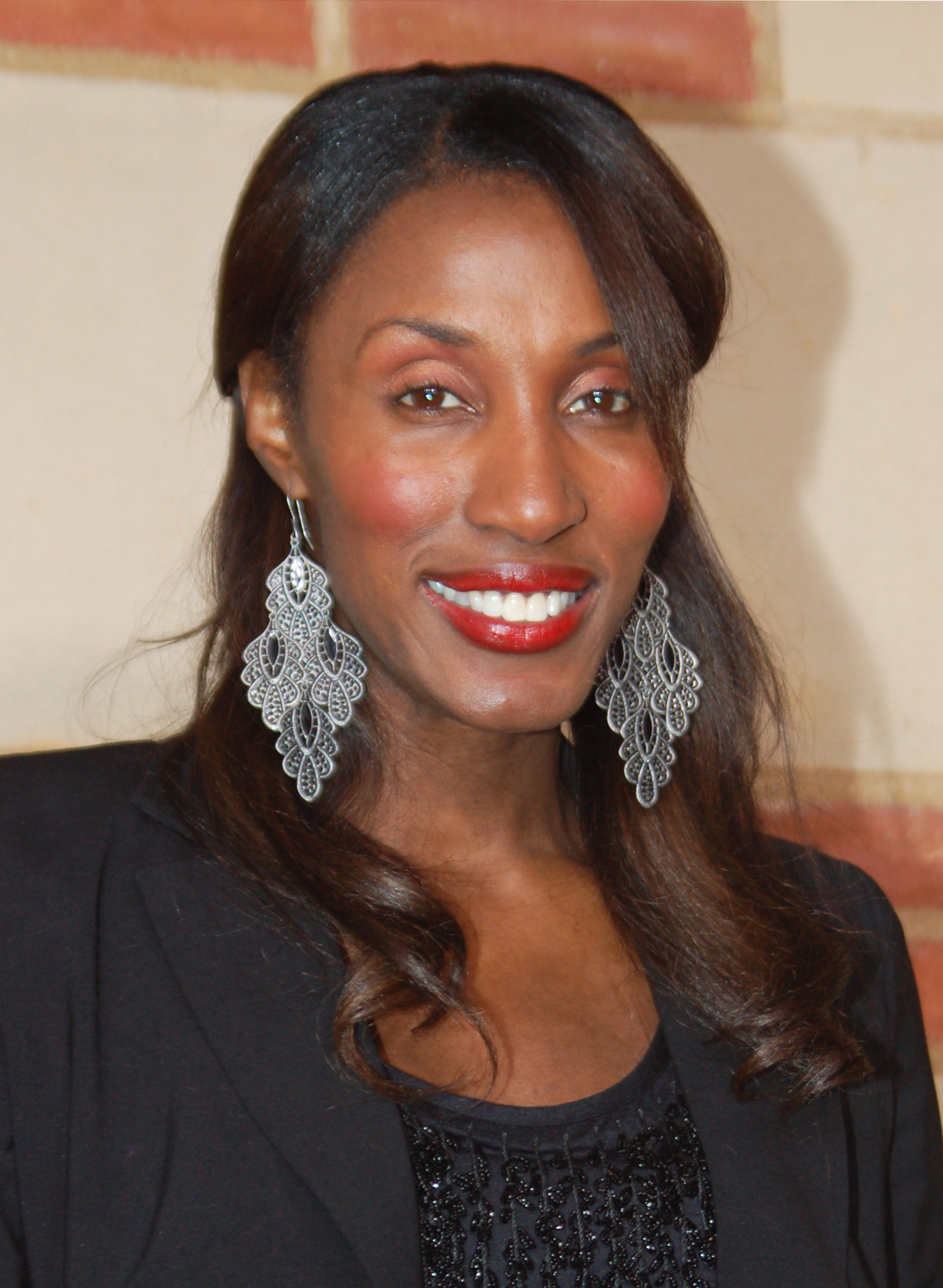
Lisa Leslie has the most blocks in WNBA playoffs history.

^	Active WNBA player
*	Inducted into the Naismith Memorial Basketball Hall of Fame
†	Not yet eligible for Hall of Fame consideration
§	Eligible for Hall of Fame in 2026

Statistics accurate as of the 2026 WNBA Finals.

Rank	Player	Position(s)	Team(s) played for (years)	Total blocks	Games played	Blocks per game average
1	Lisa Leslie*	Center	Los Angeles Sparks (1997–2009) (Note: Leslie did not play the 2007 season because of a pregnancy leave.)	132	52	2.5
2	A'ja Wilson^	Center	Las Vegas Aces (2018–present)	132	61	2.2
3	Candace Parker*	Power forward	Los Angeles Sparks (2008–2020); Chicago Sky (2021–2022); Las Vegas Aces (2023)	117	66	1.8
4	Brittney Griner^	Center	Phoenix Mercury (2013–2024); Atlanta Dream (2025); Connecticut Sun (2026–present)	105	50	2.1
5	Jonquel Jones^	Center	Connecticut Sun (2016–2022); New York Liberty (2023–present)	85	54	1.5
6	Breanna Stewart^	Power forward	Seattle Storm (2016–2022); New York Liberty (2023–present)	82	49	1.6
7	DeWanna Bonner^	Shooting guard / small forward	Phoenix Mercury (2009–2019, 2025); Connecticut Sun (2020–2024); Indiana Fever (2025); Phoenix Mercury (2025–2026); Atlanta Dream (2026–present)	82	110	0.7
8	Ruth Riley	Center	Miami Sol (2001–2002); Detroit Shock (2003–2006); San Antonio Silver Stars (2007–2011); Chicago Sky (2012); Atlanta Dream (2013–2014)	77	52	1.5
9	Sylvia Fowles*	Center	Chicago Sky (2008–2014); Minnesota Lynx (2015–2022)	69	41	1.7
10	Taj McWilliams-Franklin	Power forward / center	Orlando Miracle/Connecticut Sun (1999–2006); Los Angeles Sparks (2007); Washington Mystics (2008); Detroit Shock (2008–2009); New York Liberty (2010); Minnesota Lynx (2011–2012)	68	64	1.1

== See also ==
- Basketball statistics
- List of WNBA post-season records
- List of WNBA career blocks leaders
