= List of WNBA career playoff rebounding leaders =

This article provides one lists:

A list of Women's National Basketball Association players by total career playoffs rebounds recorded.

== Career playoff rebound leaders ==
This is a list of Women's National Basketball Association players by total career playoffs rebounds recorded.

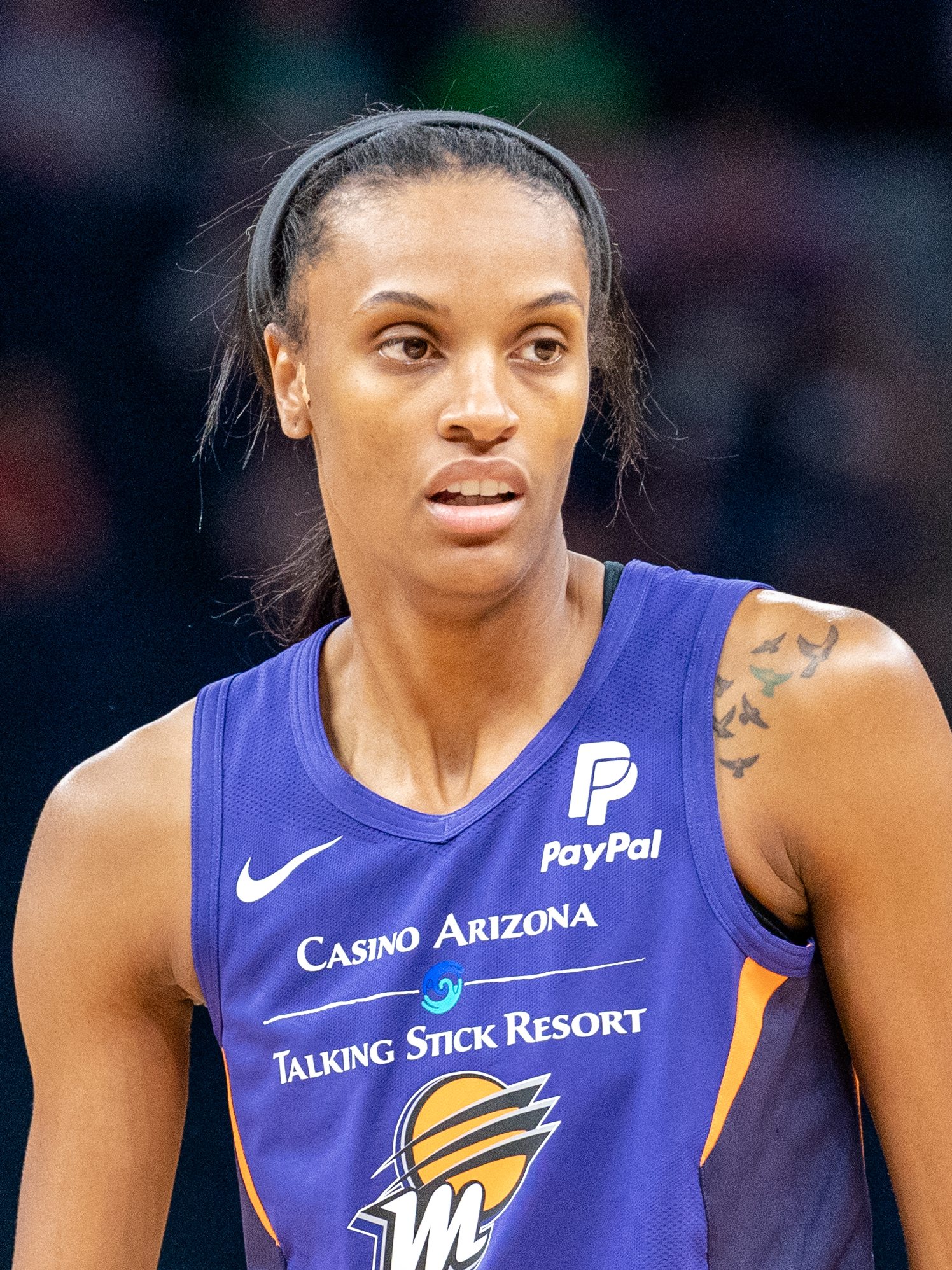
DeWanna Bonner has the most rebounds in WNBA playoffs history.

| ^ | Active WNBA player |
| * | Inducted into the Naismith Memorial Basketball Hall of Fame |
| † | Not yet eligible for Hall of Fame consideration |
| § | 1st time eligible for Hall of Fame in 2025 |

Statistics accurate as of the 2026 WNBA Finals.

| Rank | Player | Position(s) | Team(s) played for (years) | Total rebounds | Games played | Rebounds per game average |
|---|---|---|---|---|---|---|
| 1 | DeWanna Bonner^ | Shooting guard / small forward | Phoenix Mercury (2009–2019, 2025–2026); Connecticut Sun (2020–2024); Indiana Fever (2025); Atlanta Dream (2026–present) | 715 | 110 | 6.5 |
| 2 | Candace Parker* | Power forward | Los Angeles Sparks (2008–2020); Chicago Sky (2021–2022); Las Vegas Aces (2023) | 610 | 66 | 9.2 |
| 3 | A'ja Wilson^ | Center | Las Vegas Aces (2018–present) | 600 | 61 | 9.8 |
| 4 | Tamika Catchings* | Small forward | Indiana Fever (2002–2016) | 598 | 68 | 8.8 |
| 5 | Rebekkah Brunson | Power forward | Sacramento Monarchs (2004–2009); Minnesota Lynx (2010–2018) | 563 | 81 | 7.0 |
| 6 | Jonquel Jones^ | Center | Connecticut Sun (2016–2022); New York Liberty (2023–present) | 535 | 55 | 9.7 |
| 7 | Alyssa Thomas^ | Power forward | Connecticut Sun (2014–2024); Phoenix Mercury (2025–present) | 492 | 58 | 8.5 |
| 8 | Lisa Leslie* | Center | Los Angeles Sparks (1997–2009) (Note: Leslie did not play the 2007 season because of a pregnancy leave.) | 471 | 52 | 9.1 |
| 9 | Taj McWilliams-Franklin | Power forward / center | Orlando Miracle/Connecticut Sun (1999–2006); Los Angeles Sparks (2007); Washington Mystics (2008); Detroit Shock (2008–2009); New York Liberty (2010); Minnesota Lynx (2011–2012) | 442 | 64 | 6.9 |
| 10 | Breanna Stewart^ | Power forward | Seattle Storm (2016–2022); New York Liberty (2023–present) | 431 | 51 | 8.5 |

== See also ==
- Basketball statistics
- List of WNBA post-season records
- List of WNBA career rebounding leaders
