= List of WNBA career playoff scoring leaders =

This article provides one list:

A list of Women's National Basketball Association players by total career Playoffs points scored.

== Scoring leaders ==
This article provides a list of Women's National Basketball Association players by total career Playoffs points scored.

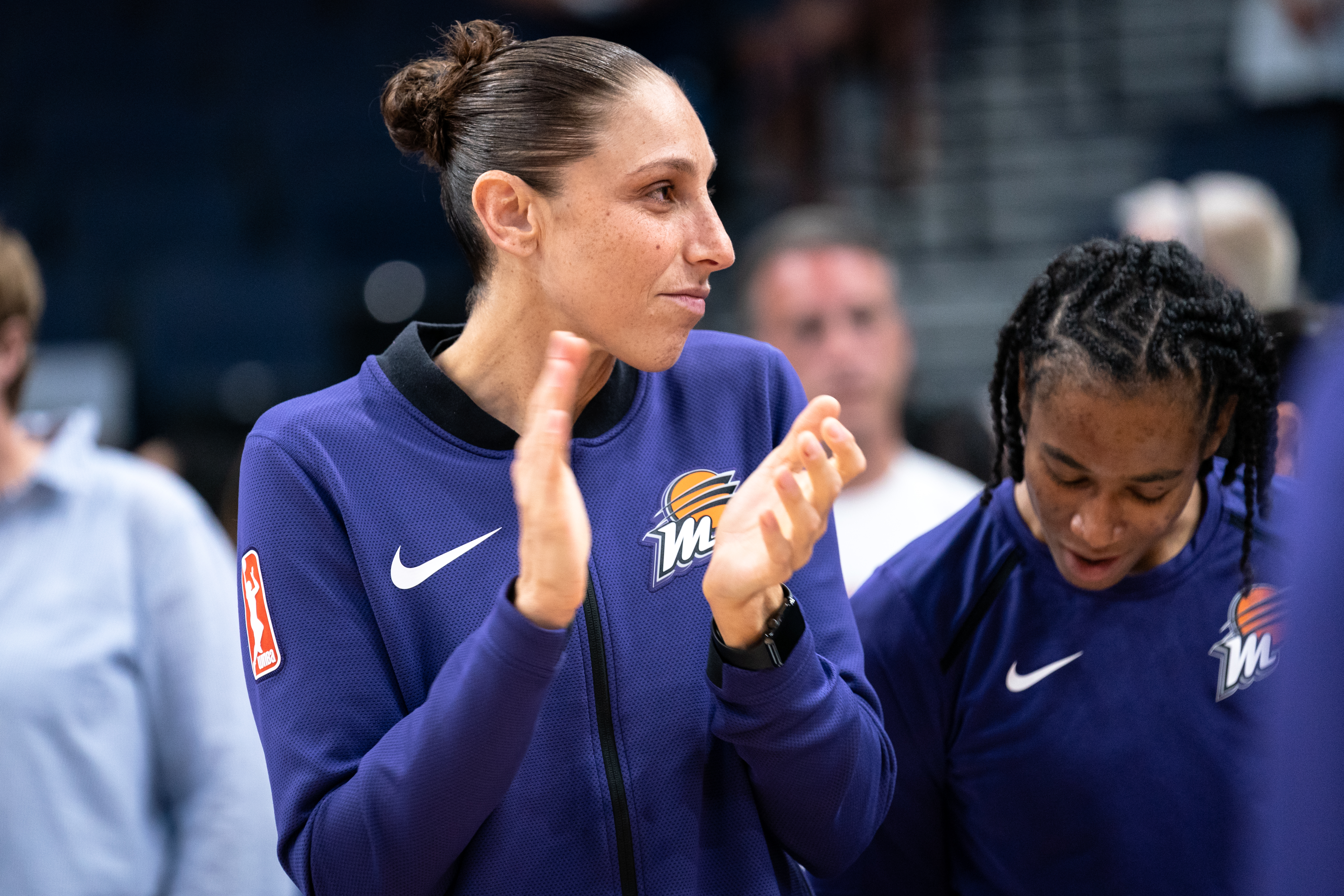
Diana Taurasi has scored the most points in WNBA playoffs history.

^	Active WNBA player
*	Inducted into the Naismith Memorial Basketball Hall of Fame
†	Not yet eligible for Hall of Fame consideration
§	1st time eligible for Hall of Fame in 2026

Statistics accurate as of the 2026 WNBA Finals.

Rank	Player	Position(s)	Team(s) played for (years)	Total points	Games played	Points per game average	Field goals made	Three-point field goals made	Free throws made
1	Diana Taurasi^{†}	Shooting guard / point guard	Phoenix Mercury (2004–2024) (Note: Taurasi did not play the 2015 season at the request of her Russian Premier League team, UMMC Ekaterinburg.)	1,486	73	20.4	489	217	291
2	DeWanna Bonner^	Shooting guard / small forward	Phoenix Mercury (2009–2019, 2025–2026); Connecticut Sun (2020–2024); Indiana Fever (2025); Atlanta Dream (2026–present)	1,383	110	12.6	479	127	298
3	A'ja Wilson^	Center	Las Vegas Aces (2018–present)	1,336	61	21.9	494	18	330
4	Candace Parker*	Power forward	Los Angeles Sparks (2008–2020); Chicago Sky (2021–2022); Las Vegas Aces (2023)	1,149	66	17.4	425	65	234
5	Tamika Catchings*	Small forward	Indiana Fever (2002–2016)	1,141	68	16.8	352	81	356
6	Maya Moore*	Power forward	Minnesota Lynx (2011–2018)	1,077	56	19.2	378	109	212
7	Breanna Stewart^	Power forward	Seattle Storm (2016–2022); New York Liberty (2023–present)	1,141	51	22.4	397	78	269
8	Chelsea Gray^	Point guard	Connecticut Sun (2015); Los Angeles Sparks (2016–2020); Las Vegas Aces (2021–present)	996	71	14.0	375	119	127
9	Lindsay Whalen*	Point guard	Connecticut Sun (2004–2009); Minnesota Lynx (2010–2018)	953	82	11.6	334	35	250
10	Lisa Leslie*	Center	Los Angeles Sparks (1997–2009) (Note: Leslie did not play the 2007 season because of a pregnancy leave.)	908	52	17.5	345	12	202

== See also ==
- Basketball statistics
- List of WNBA post-season records
- List of WNBA career scoring leaders
