= List of WNBA career playoff games played leaders =

This is a list of Women's National Basketball Association players by total career Playoffs games played.

== Games played leaders ==
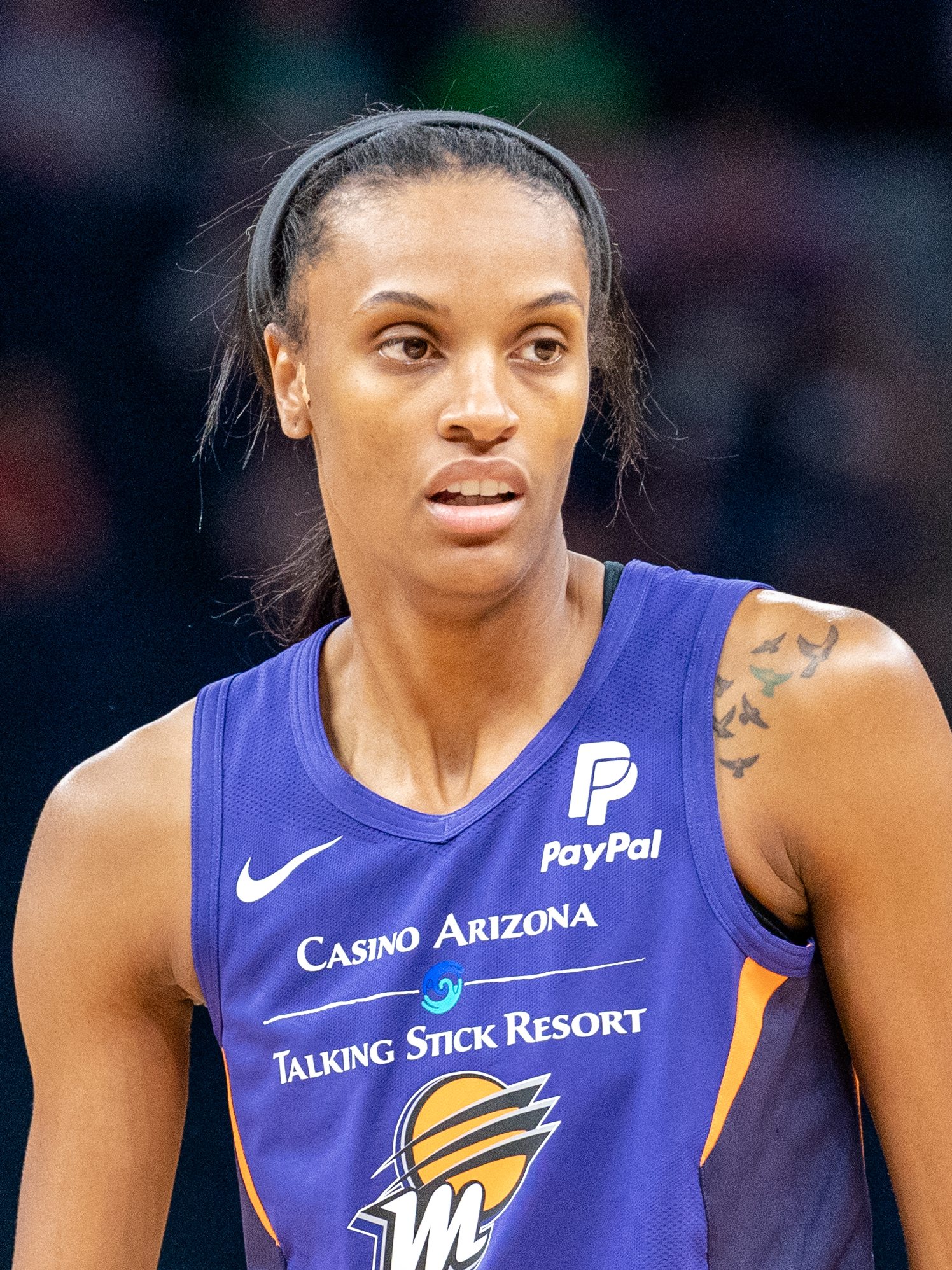
DeWanna Bonner has played the most games in WNBA playoffs history.

^	Active WNBA player
*	Inducted into the Naismith Memorial Basketball Hall of Fame
†	Not yet eligible for Hall of Fame consideration
§	1st time eligible for Hall of Fame in 2026

Statistics accurate as of the 2026 WNBA Finals.

Rank	Player	Position(s)	Team(s) played for (years)	Games played	Titles won
1	DeWanna Bonner^	Shooting guard / small forward	Phoenix Mercury (2009–2019, 2025–2026); Connecticut Sun (2020–2024); Indiana Fever (2025); Atlanta Dream (2026–present)	110	2
2	Lindsay Whalen*	Point guard	Connecticut Sun (2004–2009); Minnesota Lynx (2010–2018)	82	4
3	Rebekkah Brunson	Power forward	Sacramento Monarchs (2004–2009); Minnesota Lynx (2010–2018)	81	5
4	Diana Taurasi^{†}	Shooting guard / point guard	Phoenix Mercury (2004–2024) (Note: Taurasi did not play the 2015 season at the request of her Russian Premier League team, UMMC Ekaterinburg.)	73	3
5	Chelsea Gray^	Point guard	Connecticut Sun (2015); Los Angeles Sparks (2016–2020); Las Vegas Aces (2021–present)	71	4
6	Briann January	Point guard	Indiana Fever (2009–2017); Phoenix Mercury (2018–2019); Connecticut Sun (2020–2021); Seattle Storm (2022)	68	1
7	Tamika Catchings*	Small forward	Indiana Fever (2002–2016)	68	1
8	Candace Parker*	Power forward	Los Angeles Sparks (2008–2020); Chicago Sky (2021–2022); Las Vegas Aces (2023)	66	3
9	Taj McWilliams-Franklin	Power forward / center	Orlando Miracle (1999–2002); Connecticut Sun (2003–2006); Los Angeles Sparks (2007); Washington Mystics (2008); Detroit Shock (2008–2009); New York Liberty (2010); Minnesota Lynx (2011–2012)	64	2
10	Natasha Howard^	Power forward	Indiana Fever (2014–2015, 2025); Minnesota Lynx (2016–2017, 2026–present); Seattle Storm (2018–2020); New York Liberty (2021–2022); Dallas Wings (2023–2024)	63	3

== See also ==
- List of WNBA career games played leaders
