= Cheyenne Parker-Tyus =

American basketball player (born 1992)

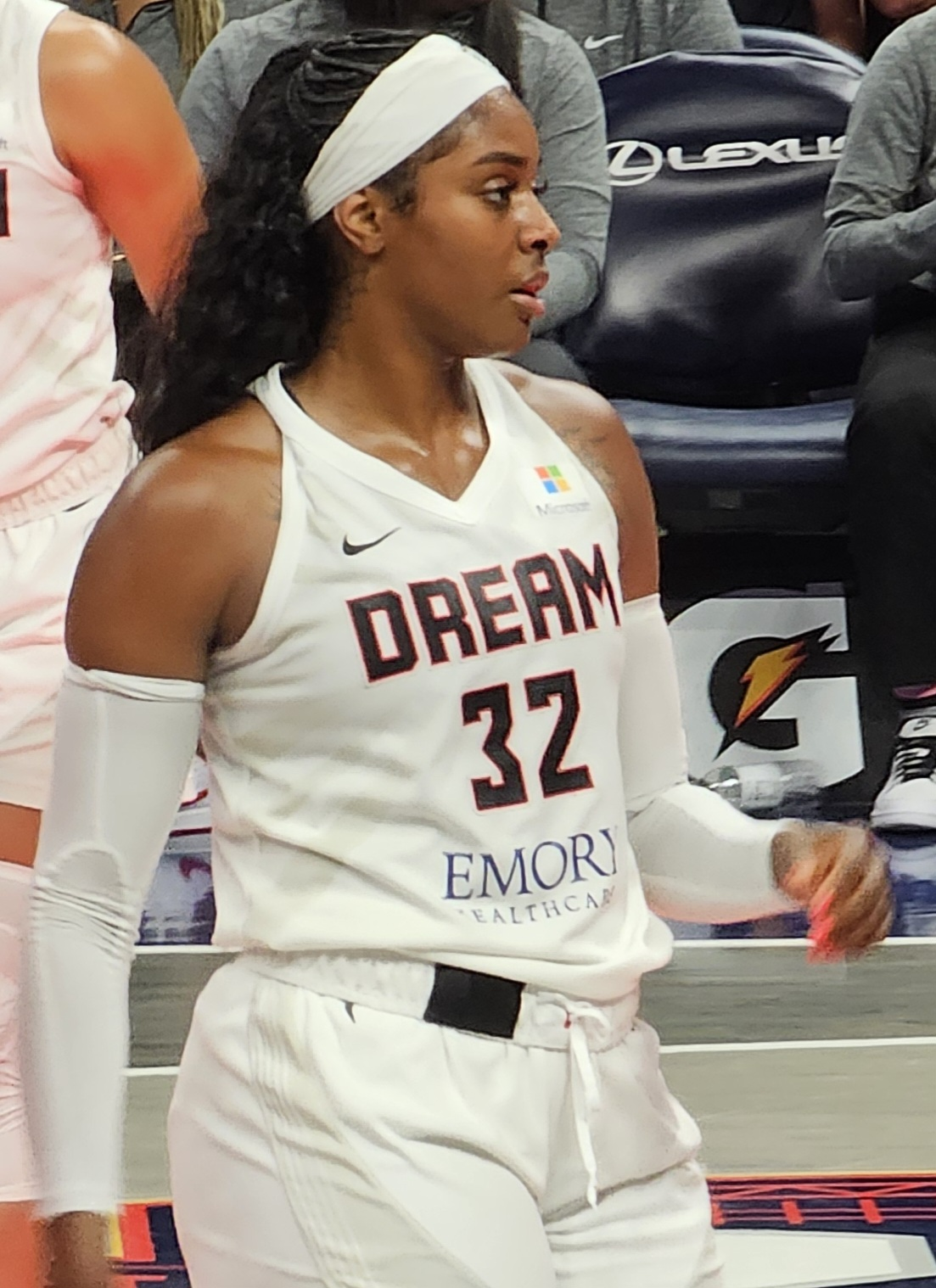
- Parker-Tyus with the Atlanta Dream in 2024

No. 32 – Las Vegas Aces
- Position: Power forward
- League: WNBA

Personal information
- Born: August 22, 1992 (age 34) Queens, New York, U.S.
- Listed height: 6 ft 4 in (1.93 m)
- Listed weight: 193 lb (88 kg)

Career information
- High school: Southwest Guilford (High Point, North Carolina)
- College: High Point (2010–2013); Middle Tennessee (2014–2015)
- WNBA draft: 2015: 1st round, 5th overall pick
- Drafted by: Chicago Sky
- Playing career: 2015–present

Career history
- 2015–2020: Chicago Sky
- 2015–2017: Henan Phoenix
- 2017–2018: Wisla Can Pack
- 2018–2019: Bucheon KEB Hana Bank
- 2019–2020: Sichuan Blue Whales
- 2020–2022: Basket Lattes
- 2021–2024: Atlanta Dream
- 2022–2023: Virtus Bologna
- 2023–2024: Zhejiang Chouzhou Bank
- 2024–2025: Beijing Great Wall
- 2025–present: Las Vegas Aces
- 2025-present: Shandong Six Stars

Career highlights
- WNBA champion (2025); WNBA All-Star (2023); First-team All-Big South (2013); Big South Defensive Player of the Year (2012, 2013); Big South All-Freshman Team (2011)
- Stats at WNBA.com
- Stats at Basketball Reference

Cheyenne Parker-Tyus (born August 22, 1992) is an American professional basketball player for the Las Vegas Aces of the Women's National Basketball Association (WNBA).

== Early life ==
Parker-Tyus was born and raised in Queens, New York. Later on in life, her parents divorced, she and her mother moved to High Point, North Carolina to help accommodate her with more basketball opportunities. She enrolled at Southwest Guilford High School and played for the girls' basketball team.

== College career ==
After graduating from Southwest Guilford High School, Parker-Tyus enrolled at High Point University. She played for the women's basketball team from 2010 to 2013. In 2014, Parker-Tyus transferred to Middle Tennessee State University, where she put up college career-high numbers in scoring and shooting percentage.

== Professional career ==
=== WNBA ===
==== Chicago Sky (2015–2020) ====
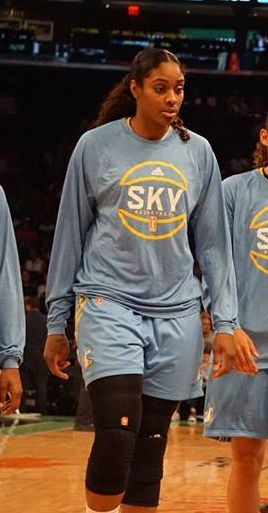
Parker-Tyus with the Sky in 2015

Parker-Tyus was drafted 5th overall in the 2015 WNBA draft by the Chicago Sky. In her rookie season, Parker-Tyus played 30 games off the bench, averaging 2.2 points per game during the regular season. The Sky had finished second in the eastern conference with a 21–13 record, but were eliminated 2–1 by the Indiana Fever in the first round.

In her second season, Parker-Tyus made her first career start and finished off the season with 7 starts in 25 games played, averaging 4.0 points per game. Under the league's new playoff format, the Sky finished fourth in the league with an 18–16 record, receiving a bye to the second round. They defeated the Atlanta Dream in the second round elimination game. In the semi-finals, the Sky lost 3–1 to the Los Angeles Sparks, who won the championship that year.

In the 2017 season, Parker-Tyus played all games off the bench, averaging 3.0 points per game in 23 games played. The Sky missed out on the playoffs with a 12–22 record.

In 2018, Parker-Tyus had a breakout season and added three-point shooting to her skill set. On June 3, 2018, she scored a career-high 20 points along with a career-high 13 rebounds in a 95–90 victory over the Las Vegas Aces. On July 31, 2018, Parker-Tyus tied her career-high of 20 points with a game winning putback in a 92–91 victory over the Dallas Wings. Parker-Tyus finished off the season averaging career-highs in every statistical category while playing 34 games with 5 starts. The Sky finished 13–21, missing out on the playoffs for the second year in a row.

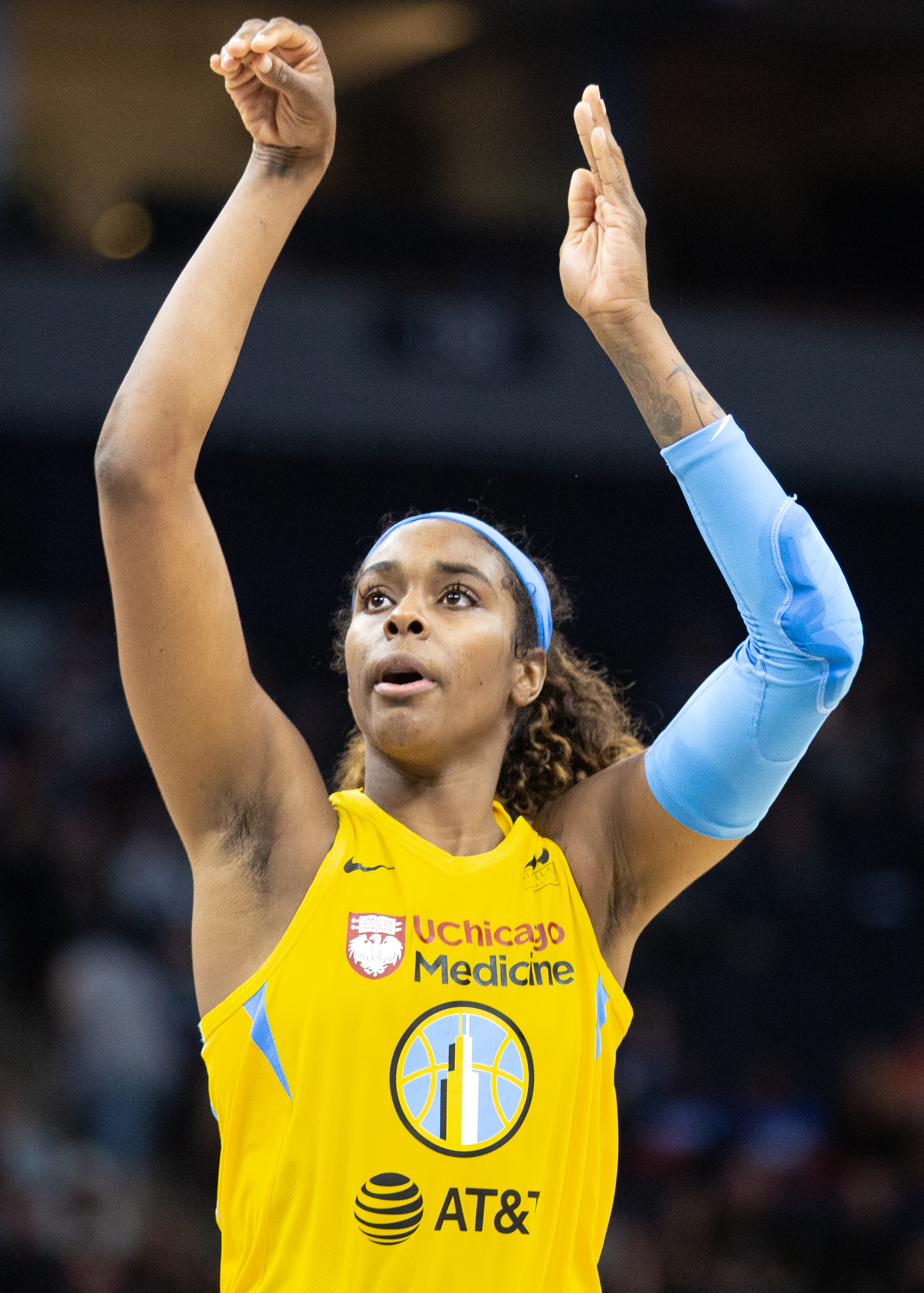
Parker-Tyus with the Chicago Sky in 2019

In 2019, Parker-Tyus re-signed with the Sky to a 2-year contract. Parker-Tyus would continue to be weapon off the bench for the Sky in the 2019 season. On June 24, 2019, Parker-Tyus scored a new career-high 22 points in a 93–75 win over the Connecticut Sun. Later on in the season, Parker-Tyus tied her career-high of 22 points in a 93–85 loss to the Minnesota Lynx. For the first time since 2016, the Sky would make it back to the playoffs finishing as the number 4 seed with a 20–14 record. By the end of the season, Parker-Tyus would average new career-highs in blocks and free throw shooting. In the first round elimination game, they defeated the Phoenix Mercury 105–76 to advance. In the second round elimination game, the Sky were defeated by the Las Vegas Aces 93–92 in heartbreaking fashion, as Dearica Hamby made a late game three-pointer from half-court to put the Aces up by one with 4 seconds left.

In 2020, Parker-Tyus would have the best season of her career, putting up new career-high numbers in scoring, assists, rebounds and shooting percentages. In the shortened 22-game season (played in the IMG Academy bubble due to the COVID-19 pandemic) she started in 13 of the 20 games played. On September 6, 2020, Parker-Tyus scored a new career-high 24 points along with 10 rebounds in a 86–80 loss to the Los Angeles Sparks. The Sky would finish 12–10 with the number 6 seed in the league, but were eliminated by the Connecticut Sun in the first round elimination game.

==== Atlanta Dream (2021–2024) ====
In 2021, Parker-Tyus signed with the Atlanta Dream.

==== Las Vegas Aces (2025–present) ====
On February 6, 2025, Parker-Tyus signed with the Las Vegas Aces.

=== Overseas ===
From 2015 to 2017, Parker-Tyus played a couple off-seasons in China for Henan Phoenix. In the 2017–18 WNBA off-season, Parker-Tyus played in Poland for Wisla Can Pack. In 2018, Parker-Tyus signed with Bucheon KEB Hana Bank of the South Korean League for the 2018–19 off-season. In 2019, Parker-Tyus signed with the Sichuan Blue Whales of the Chinese League for the 2019–20 off-season. In September 2020, Parker-Tyus signed with Basket Lattes of the French league for the 2020–21 off-season. She played with Virtus Bologna of the Lega Basket Femminile in the 2022–2023 season. In the 2023–2024 season she played with Zhejiang of the Women's Chinese Basketball Association. Parker-Tyus signed with the Beijing Great Wall for the 2024–2025 season.

== Career statistics ==
Legend
GP	Games played	GS	Games started	MPG	Minutes per game	RPG	Rebounds per game
APG	Assists per game	SPG	Steals per game	BPG	Blocks per game	PPG	Points per game
TO	Turnovers per game	FG%	Field-goal percentage	3P%	3-point field-goal percentage	FT%	Free-throw percentage
**Bold**	Career best	°	League leader

=== WNBA ===
==== Regular season ====
WNBA regular season statistics
Year	Team	GP	GS	MPG	FG%	3P%	FT%	RPG	APG	SPG	BPG	TO	PPG
2015	Chicago	30	0	9.3	.400	—	.385	2.5	.2	.2	.7	**.5**	2.2
2016	Chicago	25	7	12.6	.506	.000	.531	3.2	.2	.4	.2	.8	4.0
2017	Chicago	23	0	12.4	.464	.000	.639	3.4	.6	.3	.6	.9	3.8
2018	Chicago	34	5	19.7	.531	.316	.713	5.8	.7	.5	1.0	1.4	10.0
2019	Chicago	34	0	19.7	.459	.278	.842	5.8	.9	.7	1.2	1.3	8.8
2020	Chicago	20	13	24.9	.554	.469	.855	6.4	1.5	**1.3**	.9	2.8	13.4
2021	Atlanta	13	11	20.8	.455	.333	.786	4.5	1.2	1.2	.9	1.3	10.2
2022	Atlanta	36	35	26.2	.500	.218	.795	6.2	**2.0**	1.1	.9	2.0	11.8
2023	Atlanta	**40**	**38**	**26.7**	.483	.278	.829	**6.7**	1.8	1.1	**1.5**	2.3	**15.0**
2024	Atlanta	25	11	19.7	.444	.214	**.886**	4.8	1.5	.8	.4	2.1	9.2
2025^{†}	Las Vegas	2	0	7.0	**.625**	.500	.833	1.0	.0	.0	.0	**.5**	8.0
2026	Las Vegas	31	1	11.2	.519	**.529**	.774	2.9	.7	.5	.7	.6	5.4
**Career**	12 years, 3 teams	313	121	18.7	.489	.310	.775	4.8	1.0	.7	.9	1.5	8.7
**Career**	All-Star	1	0	18.4	.714	.750	1.000	6.0	2.0	1.0	.0	.0	14.0

==== Playoffs ====
WNBA playoff statistics
Year	Team	GP	GS	MPG	FG%	3P%	FT%	RPG	APG	SPG	BPG	TO	PPG
2015	Chicago	2	0	7.0	**.667**	—	—	1.5	.0	.0	.0	**.0**	2.0
2016	Chicago	5	0	9.5	.333	—	.500	1.8	.4	.2	.0	.6	2.8
2019	Chicago	2	0	21.8	.438	.000	.833	5.5	1.0	1.5	1.0	1.0	9.5
2020	Chicago	1	1	25.0	.250	.000	**1.000**	**8.0**	**3.0**	**2.0**	1.0	3.0	8.0
2023	Atlanta	2	**2**	**33.5**	.323	**.500**	.750	6.5	2.0	1.0	**2.0**	2.5	**13.0**
2025^{†}	Las Vegas	**6**	0	6.0	.400	.333	.750	1.0	.2	.0	.2	.3	2.0
2026	Las Vegas	**6**	0	12.8	.533	**.500**	.600	2.2	.3	.8	.5	.5	4.0
**Career**	7 years, 3 teams	24	3	12.9	.396	.333	.690	2.6	.6	.5	.5	.8	4.5

=== College ===
NCAA statistics
Year	Team	GP	MPG	FG%	3P%	FT%	RPG	APG	SPG	BPG	TO	PPG
2010–11	High Point	30	21.5	.418	.091	.647	8.0	.7	1.1	2.5	1.8	7.8
2011–12	High Point	**33**	29.0	.500	.000	.635	12.2	.8	2.1	3.7	2.7	13.0
2012–13	High Point	30	**30.7**	.491	.000	.652	**13.2**	**1.9**	**2.3**	**4.4**	**4.5**	17.9
2013–14	Middle Tennessee	Did not play due to NCAA transfer rules										
2014–15	Middle Tennessee	22	28.4	**.588**	**.333**	**.676**	11.0	1.7	1.3	4.0	3.4	**18.6**
**Career**		115	27.3	.502	.0	65.2	11.1	1.2	1.7	3.6	3.1	14.0

== Personal life ==
In April 2025, Parker-Tyus announced her second pregnancy and was expected to "miss at least the first three months" of the 2025 WNBA season.
