= Brandon Banks (defensive lineman) =

American football player (born 1994)

Profile
- Position: Defensive end

Personal information
- Born: July 13, 1994 (age 32); Greensboro, North Carolina, U.S.
- Listed height: 6 ft 3 in (1.91 m)
- Listed weight: 267 lb (121 kg)

Career information
- High school: Southwest Guilford (NC)
- College: Charlotte
- NFL draft: 2017: undrafted

Career history
- Washington Redskins (2017); Calgary Stampeders (2018)*; Indianapolis Colts (2018)*; BC Lions (2020)*
- * Offseason or practice squad member only
- Stats at Pro Football Reference

Brandon Banks (born July 13, 1994) is an American stock car racing pit crew member and former professional football defensive end. He played college football at University of North Carolina at Charlotte. He signed with the Washington Redskins as an undrafted free agent in 2017.

== Professional career ==
Pre-draft measurables
Height	Weight	Arm length	Hand span	40-yard dash	10-yard split	20-yard split	20-yard shuttle	Three-cone drill	Vertical jump	Broad jump	Bench press
6 ft 2 3/4 in (1.90 m)	262 lb (119 kg)	31 7/8 in (0.81 m)	9 7/8 in (0.25 m)	5.00 s	1.64 s	2.78 s	4.69 s	7.67 s	30.5 in (0.77 m)	8 ft 11 in (2.72 m)	26 reps
All values from Pro Day

=== Washington Redskins ===
Banks signed with the Washington Redskins as an undrafted free agent on May 4, 2017. He was waived on September 2, 2017, and was signed to the practice squad the next day. Banks was promoted to the active roster on November 11, 2017. He was waived by the Redskins on November 14, 2017.

=== Calgary Stampeders ===
Banks signed with the Calgary Stampeders of the CFL on March 19, 2018. He was placed on the retired list before the start of the season on May 23, and released on August 15.

=== Indianapolis Colts ===
On August 23, 2018, Banks was signed by the Indianapolis Colts. He was waived on September 1, 2018.

=== BC Lions ===
Banks signed a futures contract with the BC Lions on November 1, 2019. The 2020 CFL season was canceled, and Banks was released on February 3, 2021.

== NASCAR ==
In 2018, Banks joined NASCAR's Drive for Diversity Pit Crew Program. He worked for Stewart–Haas Racing until the team's shutdown at the end of the 2024 season, after which he joined 23XI Racing.

Banks was the jackman for the No. 45 Toyota of Tyler Reddick that won the 2026 Daytona 500.
