= Southwest Guilford High School =

American public school in North Carolina

Location
- 4364 Barrow Rd; High Point, North Carolina 27265; United States; 36°02′47″N 79°59′20″W

Information
- Type: Public
- Established: 1979 (47 years ago)
- School district: Guilford County Schools
- CEEB code: 341851
- Principal: Darrick Bracy
- Faculty: 87.67 (FTE)
- Grades: 9–12
- Enrollment: 1,588 (2018–19)
- Student to teacher ratio: 18.11
- Campus type: Suburban
- Colors: Green and black
- Fight song
- Athletics: NCHSAA 7A
- Athletics conference: Metro 6A/7A
- Team name: Cowboys/Cowgirls
- Rival: Ragsdale Guilford Highschool.
- USNWR ranking: 4,451
- National ranking: 4,451
- Newspaper: Lariat
- Yearbook: Horizons
- Website: southwesths.gcsnc.com

Southwest Guilford High School is a secondary school in High Point, North Carolina, United States established in 1979. It serves grades nine through twelve. The school was recently renovated and expanded to add more class rooms, a media center, and a gymnasium. The new gymnasium is the largest high school gym in Guilford County. The gym is named after long time SW Guilford teacher and coach Jim Coggins.

== Athletics ==
Southwest Guilford is a member of the North Carolina High School Athletic Association (NCHSAA) and are classified as a 7A school. The school is a part of the Metro 6A/7A Conference.

The Southwest Guilford Athletic program is led by athletic director Brindon Christman. The Southwest Guilford sport teams are known as the "Cowboys and Cowgirls." The school colors are kelly green, black and white. However, when the school was first started, the colors were brown, kelly green, and white.

The school has rivalries with Ragsdale High School, as well as crosstown schools T. Wingate Andrews High School and High Point Central High School.

=== State Championships ===
Southwest Guilford has won the following NCHSAA team state championships:

- Baseball: 1997 (2A)
- Boys Basketball: 1996 (2A), 2017 (4A), 2019 (3A)
- Girls Basketball: 1984 (2A), 1985 (2A), 2011 (4A)
- Boys Golf: 1987 (1A/2A)
- Boys Soccer: 1994 (1A/2A)
- Girls Soccer: 1995 (1A/2A/3A), 1997 (1A/2A/3A), 2001 (3A), 2002 (3A)
- Girls Swimming: 1995 (1A/2A/3A), 1997 (1A/2A/3A)
- Boys Indoor Track & Field: 2009 (1A/2A/3A)
- Volleyball: 1995 (2A), 2006 (3A)

== Notable alumni ==
- Stefon Adams — NFL defensive back
- Brandon Banks — NFL defensive end
- Adam Lazzara — vocalist of Taking Back Sunday
- Raj Panjabi — physician, social entrepreneur and professor
- Cheyenne Parker-Tyus — professional basketball player in the WNBA
- Eddie Pope — former MLS player and United States men's national soccer team (USMNT) member
- Clyde Simms — former MLS player and USMNT member
- Caleb Smith — freestyle and folkstyle wrestler
- Brian Williams — NFL defensive back

== See also ==
- List of high schools in North Carolina
