= Rebekah Gardner =

American basketball player (born 1990)

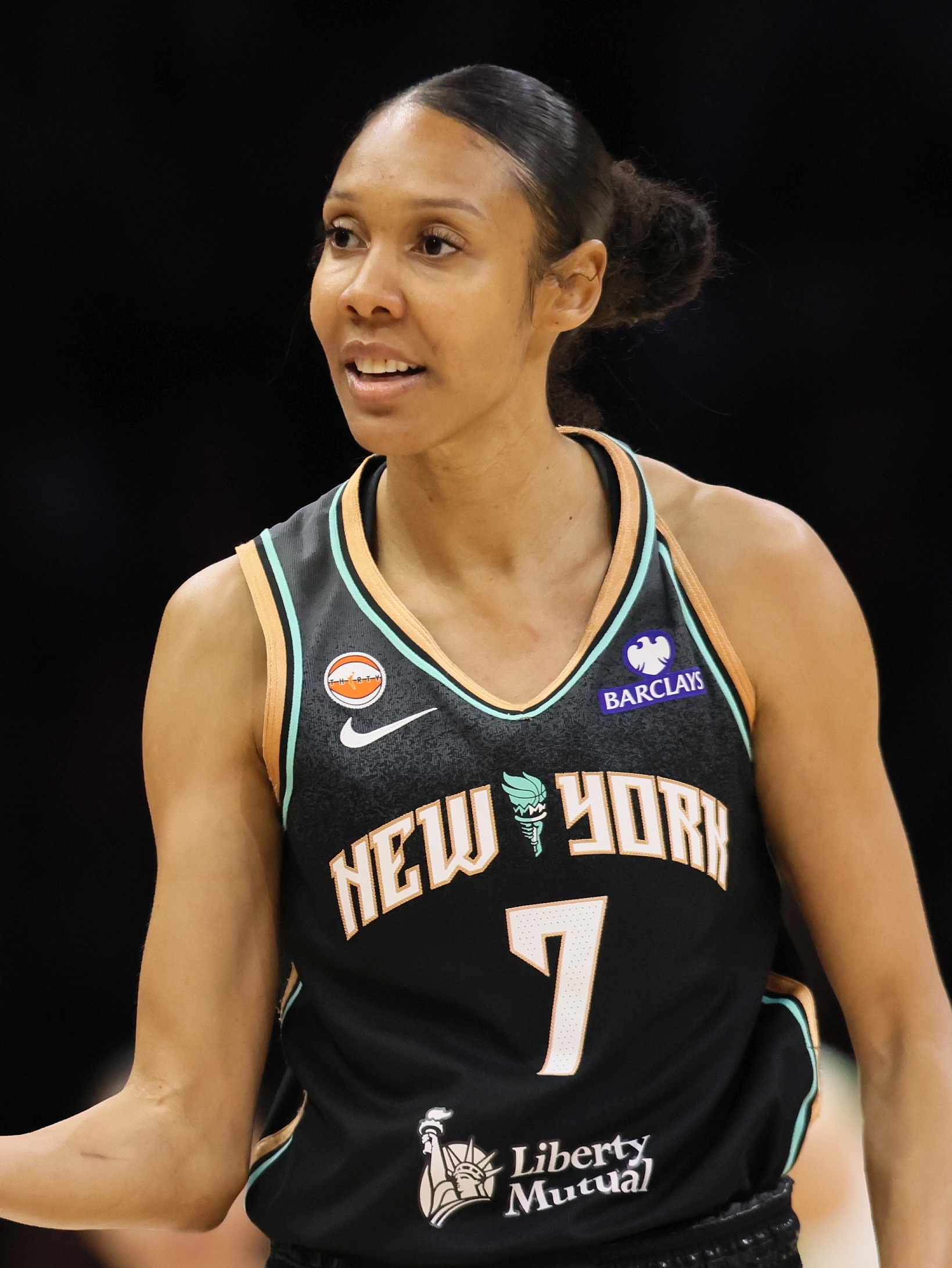
- Gardner with the New York Liberty in 2026

No. 7 – New York Liberty
- Position: Guard
- League: WNBA

Personal information
- Born: July 9, 1990 (age 36) Palm Springs, California, U.S.
- Listed height: 6 ft 1 in (1.85 m)
- Listed weight: 130 lb (59 kg)

Career information
- High school: Ayala High School (Chino Hills, California)
- College: UCLA (2008–2012)
- WNBA draft: 2012: undrafted
- Playing career: 2012–present

Career history
- 2016–2017: Osmaniye
- 2020–2021: ACS Sepsi SIC
- 2021–2024: Uni Girona CB
- 2022–2023: Chicago Sky
- 2025–present: New York Liberty

Career highlights
- WNBA Commissioner's Cup Champion (2026); WNBA All-Rookie Team (2022); Pac-12 Second Team (2012)
- Stats at Basketball Reference

Rebekah Gardner (born July 9, 1990) is an American professional basketball player for the New York Liberty of the Women's National Basketball Association (WNBA). She played college basketball at UCLA.

== College career ==
During her first three years at UCLA, Gardner was mainly a role player off the bench for the Bruins. Her freshman season Gardner scored a then career-high 13 points over USC. During her sophomore year, Gardner made 7 starts for the Bruins and then increased her career-high in points to 19 against Washington State. She also was named to the Pac-10 All-Academic Honorable Mention Team. During her senior season, Gardner started in all 30 games for UCLA and became a focal point to their offense. She increased her scoring to 15.9 points and gathered in 6.4 rebounds. This got her named to the All-Pac-12 Team.

== College statistics ==
Year	Team	GP	Points	FG%	3P%	FT%	RPG	APG	SPG	BPG	PPG
08-09	UCLA	31	136	.346	.346	.769	1.8	0.3	0.6	0.2	4.4
09-10	UCLA	34	234	.414	.300	.833	2.1	0.9	1.4	0.7	6.9
10-11	UCLA	32	254	.427	.354	.750	3.3	1.0	1.3	0.3	7.9
11-12	UCLA	30	477	.415	.263	.735	6.4	2.1	2.0	0.1	15.9
Career		127	1101	.408	.306	.760	3.3	1.1	1.3	0.3	8.6

== Professional career ==
=== Overseas ===
For the 2021–2022 season, Gardner signed to play with Uni Girona CB of the Liga Femenina de Baloncesto. Fellow UCLA Bruin alums, Michaela Onyenwere and Kennedy Burke also signed to play with the club.

=== WNBA ===
==== Chicago Sky ====
Gardner signed a training camp contract with the Sky on March 22, 2017.

On February 10, 2022, Gardner signed a training camp contract with the Chicago Sky. The undrafted 31 yr old made the Sky's roster & has been a vital cog in the teams' 2nd best record in the league, as of 6-28-2022.

==== New York Liberty ====
On March 15, 2024, Gardner was traded to the New York Liberty in exchange for 2025 & 2026 second round picks.

== WNBA career statistics ==
Legend
GP	Games played	GS	Games started	MPG	Minutes per game	RPG	Rebounds per game
APG	Assists per game	SPG	Steals per game	BPG	Blocks per game	PPG	Points per game
TO	Turnovers per game	FG%	Field-goal percentage	3P%	3-point field-goal percentage	FT%	Free-throw percentage
**Bold**	Career best	°	League leader

=== Regular season ===
Year	Team	GP	GS	MPG	FG%	3P%	FT%	RPG	APG	SPG	BPG	TO	PPG
2022	Chicago	35	2	**21.7**	**.542**	.357	.800	3.3	1.3	1.4	**.5**	1.6	**8.4**
2023	Chicago	3	0	19.7	.429	**.600**	**1.000**	**3.7**	**2.3**	**2.0**	.3	1.7	7.0
2025	New York	41	**5**	12.2	.500	.476	.815	1.8	.6	.6	.2	**.6**	3.7
2026	New York	**42**	2	14.9	.491	.255	.930	2.4	1.2	.5	.2	**.6**	5.0
Career	4 years, 2 teams	121	9	16.1	.513	.368	.853	2.5	1.0	.8	.3	.9	5.6

=== Playoffs ===
Year	Team	GP	GS	MPG	FG%	3P%	FT%	RPG	APG	SPG	BPG	TO	PPG
2022	Chicago	**8**	0	**17.9**	.389	.000	**.857**	**3.3**	**1.8**	**.8**	**.4**	.9	**5.0**
2025	New York	3	0	14.4	.333	**.500**	—	.3	.0	.0	.0	**.0**	1.0
2026	New York	4	0	6.5	**.667**	**.500**	—	1.0	.3	.3	.0	.5	2.3
Career	3 years, 2 teams	15	0	12.3	.422	.200	.857	2.1	1.0	.5	.2	.6	3.5

== Personal life ==
Gardner is cousins with former NFL player Toussaint Tyler.
