= Stefon Adams =

American gridiron football player (born 1963)

No. 44, 47, 85, 39
- Position: Cornerback

Personal information
- Born: August 11, 1963 (age 63); High Point, North Carolina, U.S.
- Listed height: 5 ft 10 in (1.78 m)
- Listed weight: 185 lb (84 kg)

Career information
- High school: Southwest Guilford (High Point)
- College: East Carolina
- NFL draft: 1985: 3rd round, 80th overall pick

Career history
- Los Angeles Raiders (1986–1989); Cleveland Browns (1990); Miami Dolphins (1990); Los Angeles Raiders (1991)*; Sacramento Surge (1992); Charlotte Rage (1994); Connecticut Coyotes (1995); Hamilton Tiger-Cats (1995)
- * Offseason or practice squad member only

Career NFL statistics
- Interceptions: 2
- Fumble recoveries: 6
- Stats at Pro Football Reference

Stefon Lee Adams (born August 11, 1963) is an American former professional football player who was a cornerback in the National Football League (NFL). He played six seasons for the Los Angeles Raiders (1986–1989), Cleveland Browns (1990), and Miami Dolphins (1990). He was selected by the Raiders in the third round of the 1985 NFL draft. Adams played wide receiver for the Sacramento Surge in 1992. He was part of the Sacramento Surge team that won World Bowl II in 1992. He played in three games for the Hamilton Tiger-Cats in 1995, making 10 tackles and two pass deflections. He has two children, Blake Adams and Ishmael Adams.
