= 2022 WNBA season =

- League: Women's National Basketball Association
- Sport: Basketball
- Duration: May 6 – September 18, 2022
- Games: 36
- Teams: 12
- Total attendance: 1,215,359
- Average attendance: 5,647
- TV partner(s): ABC, ESPN, ESPN2, CBS, CBSSN, NBA TV

Draft
- Top draft pick: (United States) Rhyne Howard
- Picked by: Atlanta Dream

Regular season
- Top seed: Las Vegas Aces
- Season MVP: (United States) A'ja Wilson (Las Vegas)
- Top scorer: (United States) Breanna Stewart (Seattle)

Playoffs
- Finals champions: Las Vegas Aces (1st title)
- Runners-up: Connecticut Sun
- Finals MVP: (United States) Chelsea Gray (Las Vegas)

WNBA seasons
- ← 2021 2023 →

The 2022 WNBA season was the 26th season of the Women's National Basketball Association (WNBA). The Chicago Sky were the defending champions.

The WNBA's second Commissioner's Cup took place during the regular season, with the Las Vegas Aces winning over the Sky. In the playoffs, the Aces were the first seed and won the Finals over the Connecticut Sun.

The regular season was expanded to 36 games per team, is the most games scheduled in a single WNBA season. A 36-game season was originally scheduled for 2020, but the plan was scrapped due to the COVID-19 pandemic. This season also marked the return of an all-series playoffs, which was last used in 2015, instead of the prior schedule of two rounds of single-elimination games and byes for the higher-seeded teams. The first-round series used a 2–1 format, with the higher seed hosting the first two games (differing from the 1–1–1 format used up to 2015). The semifinals and finals remained best-of-five series. The playoffs began on August 17 and concluded on September 18.

In May 2022, WNBA Commissioner Cathy Engelbert announced that during this upcoming season, the league would honor the Phoenix Mercury star Brittney Griner with a "BG42" floor decal in a notable spot on the court of all 12 teams. The Mercury center has been detained in Russia since February 2022 after customs officials said they found hashish oil in her luggage at an airport. The "BG42" floor decal was also prominently found on the Mercury's parent team, the Phoenix Suns, during the rest of the year after she was detained in Russia.

== Draft ==
The Washington Mystics won the first pick in the 2022 WNBA draft in the draft lottery. They were followed by the Indiana Fever for second, Atlanta Dream for third, and Los Angeles Sparks for fourth. The Sparks had traded their pick to the Dallas Wings before the lottery, who subsequently sent the pick to the Fever in a trade that helped Dallas secure Teaira McCowan. As part of a three-team trade, Washington and Atlanta swapped lottery picks, resulting in each team receiving 2022's third and first picks, respectively. The Fever ended up with four top-10 picks, and seven overall.

=== Lottery picks ===
Pick	Player	Nationality	Team	School / club team
1	Rhyne Howard	United States	Atlanta Dream (from Washington) (Note: April 6, 2022: Washington to Atlanta: Atlanta acquired the #1 Overall Pick in 2022; Washington acquired the #3 Overall Pick in 2022, the #14 Pick in 2022, and the right to swap picks with Los Angeles in 2023)	Kentucky
2	NaLyssa Smith	United States	Indiana Fever	Baylor
3	Shakira Austin	United States	Washington Mystics (from Atlanta)	Ole Miss
4	Emily Engstler	United States	Indiana Fever (from Los Angeles via Dallas) (Note: March 8, 2022: Dallas to Indiana: Dallas acquired Teaira McCowan, a 2022 first-round pick, and Chicago's 2023 first-round pick; Indiana acquired 2022 first-round picks and a 2023 first-round pick) (Note: June 2, 2021: Los Angeles to Dallas: Los Angeles acquired 2021 first-round and 2022 second-round picks; Dallas acquired a 2022 first-round pick)	Louisville

== Media coverage ==
In March 2022, the league announced plans to feature the broadcasts of nine regular season games on ABC, five on ESPN, and ten on ESPN2—totaling 25 games, including the 2022 WNBA All-Star Game. The league also revealed that those same channels will air the entire 2022 postseason, which could consist of as many as 27 games.

The remaining national broadcast schedule was released in April and May 2022—including two regular season games on CBS and 38 on CBS Sports Network, 46 on NBA TV, 16 on Amazon Prime Video, 20 on Facebook Watch, and 12 on Twitter. Prime Video also streamed the 2022 WNBA Commissioner's Cup Final.

== Transactions ==
The free agency negotiation period started on January 15, while players could sign to a team as soon as February 1.

=== Coaching changes ===
Off-season
Team	2021 season	2022 season	Reference
Atlanta Dream	Darius Taylor (interim)	Tanisha Wright	
Las Vegas Aces	Bill Laimbeer	Becky Hammon	
New York Liberty	Walt Hopkins	Sandy Brondello	
Phoenix Mercury	Sandy Brondello	Vanessa Nygaard	
Mid-season
Team	Departing Coach	New Coach	Reference
Indiana Fever	Marianne Stanley	Carlos Knox	
Los Angeles Sparks	Derek Fisher	Fred Williams	

== Regular season ==
=== All-Star Game ===
ABC, TSN3/SN1

July 10, 2022
1:00 p.m. ET

Report

Team Wilson 134, Team Stewart 112
Scoring by quarter: 23–28, 36–11, 33–38, 42–35
Pts: Kelsey Plum (30); Rebs: Sylvia Fowles (9); Asts: Courtney Vandersloot (8)	Pts: Jonquel Jones (29); Rebs: Jonquel Jones (13); Asts: Sue Bird/Skylar Diggins-Smith (6)

Wintrust Arena, Chicago, Illinois
Attendance: 9,572
Referees: Isaac Barnett
Tim Greene
Toni Patillo

=== Standings ===
#	Team	W	L	PCT	GB	Conf.	Home	Road	Cup
1	x – Las Vegas Aces	26	10	.722	–	15–3	13–5	13–5	9–1
2	x – Chicago Sky	26	10	.722	–	15–3	14–4	12–6	9–1
3	x – Connecticut Sun	25	11	.694	1.0	11–7	13–5	12–6	5–5
4	x – Seattle Storm	22	14	.611	4.0	10–8	13–5	9–9	6–4
5	x – Washington Mystics	22	14	.611	4.0	11–7	12–6	10–8	5–5
6	x – Dallas Wings	18	18	.500	8.0	8–10	8–10	10–8	5–5
7	x – New York Liberty	16	20	.444	10.0	10–8	9–9	7–11	6–4
8	x – Phoenix Mercury	15	21	.417	11.0	7–11	11–7	4–14	3–7
9	e – Minnesota Lynx	14	22	.389	12.0	8–10	7–11	7–11	4–6
10	e – Atlanta Dream	14	22	.389	12.0	5–13	8–10	6–12	3–7
11	e – Los Angeles Sparks	13	23	.361	13.0	6–12	7–11	6–12	3–7
12	e – Indiana Fever	5	31	.139	21.0	2–16	3–15	2–16	2–8

Notes

(#) – League Standing
x – Clinched playoff berth
e – Eliminated from playoff contention
Source: Overall standings and Commissioner's Cup Standings

=== Schedule ===
2022 WNBA preseason
Preseason

Date	Time (ET)	Matchup			TV	Result	High points	High rebounds	High assists	Location
Monday, April 11	7:00 p.m.	2022 WNBA draft			USA: ESPN; Canada: TSN1/4					Spring Studios, Tribeca, New York City
Saturday, April 23	9:00 p.m.	Los Angeles	@	Seattle		68–81	Stewart (20)	Nelson-Ododa (12)	Nelson-Ododa (5)	Climate Pledge Arena; 5,734
Sunday, April 24	3:00 p.m.	Washington	@	Atlanta		69–88	Wallace (17)	Austin (12)	Hines-Allen (7)	Gateway Center Arena; 854
Monday, April 25	12:30 p.m.	Dallas	@	Chicago		92–77	Tied (24)	Thompson (10)	Evans (7)	Wintrust Arena
Wednesday, April 27	11:30 a.m.	Minnesota	@	Washington		66–78	Delle Donne (21)	Austin (13)	Cloud (4)	Entertainment and Sports Arena; 3,220
Thursday, April 28	10:00 p.m.	Seattle	@	Phoenix		82–78	Tied (16)	Anigwe (8)	Diggins-Smith (8)	Footprint Center; 2,759
Saturday, April 30	3:00 p.m	Washington	@	New York		CAN	N/A			Barclays Center
Saturday, April 30	3:00 p.m	Chicago	@	Indiana		75–79	Egbo (15)	Egbo (10)	K. Mitchell (5)	Gainbridge Fieldhouse
Saturday, April 30	4:00 p.m.	Phoenix	@	Los Angeles		84–87	K. Williams (25)	Anigwe (11)	Tied (3)	Matadome; N/A
Sunday, May 1	1:00 p.m.	Atlanta	@	Connecticut		78–94	J. Jones (15)	Tied (6)	J. Thomas (5)	Mohegan Sun Arena; 3,244
Sunday, May 1	2:00 p.m.	Las Vegas	@	Minnesota		86–89	Plum (16)	R. Davis (11)	Plum (5)	Target Center; N/A
Monday, May 2	2:00 p.m.	Indiana	@	Dallas		89–101	K. Mitchell (21)	Egbo (9)	Tied (6)	College Park Center; N/A

2022 WNBA regular season
May

Date	Time (ET)	Matchup			TV	Result	High points	High rebounds	High assists	Location
Friday, May 6
Friday, May 6	7:00 p.m.	Indiana	@	Washington	Facebook, NBC Sports Washington/Monumental Sports, Fever.WNBA.com	70–84	Delle Donne (21)	N. Smith (13)	Cloud (6)	Entertainment and Sports Arena; 4,200
Friday, May 6	8:00 p.m.	Los Angeles	@	Chicago	USA: NBA TV, Marquee Sports Network, Spectrum Sportsnet; Canada: NBA TV Canada	98–91 (OT)	Evans (24)	Meesseman (8)	Tied (8)	Wintrust Arena; 8,111
Friday, May 6	10:00 p.m.	Las Vegas	@	Phoenix	USA: NBA TV, Bally Sports Arizona Extra; Canada: TSN5	106–88	Diggins-Smith (25)	Wilson (11)	Taurasi (9)	Footprint Center; 7,167
Friday, May 6	10:00 p.m.	Minnesota	@	Seattle	Twitter, FOX 13+/Amazon Prime (Seattle), The CW (Twin Cities)	74–97	Tied (17)	Shepard (12)	Bird (9)	Climate Pledge Arena; 12,904
Saturday, May 7
Saturday, May 7	6:00 p.m.	Connecticut	@	New York	USA: ESPN; Canada: TSN1/3/5	79–81	Tied (25)	Tied (7)	Tied (6)	Barclays Center; 6,829
Saturday, May 7	8:00 p.m.	Atlanta	@	Dallas	CBSSN	66–59	Mabrey (20)	Billings (14)	R. Howard (4)	College Park Center; 5,796
Sunday, May 8	3:00 p.m.	Los Angeles	@	Indiana	Amazon Prime	87–77	Cambage (22)	Cambage (11)	K. Mitchell (7)	Gainbridge Fieldhouse; 2,545
Sunday, May 8	8:00 p.m.	Washington	@	Minnesota	USA: ESPN2; Canada: NBA TV Canada	78–66	Atkins (20)	Shepard (12)	Cloud (6)	Target Center; 8,134
Sunday, May 8	10:00 p.m.	Seattle	@	Las Vegas	USA: ESPN2; Canada: NBA TV Canada	74–85	Stewart (21)	Hamby (19)	Tied (7)	Michelob Ultra Arena; 6,212
Tuesday, May 10	7:00 p.m.	Las Vegas	@	Washington	Facebook	76–89	Tied (19)	Wilson (11)	Hines-Allen (8)	Entertainment and Sports Arena; 3,082
Tuesday, May 10	7:00 p.m.	Minnesota	@	Indiana		76–82	Tied (26)	Fowles (14)	Shepard (9)	Gainbridge Fieldhouse; 1,078
Wednesday, May 11	7:00 p.m.	Los Angeles	@	Atlanta	USA: Bally Sports South, Spectrum Sportsnet; Canada: TSN5	75–77	R. Howard (21)	N. Ogwumike (15)	Wheeler (5)	Gateway Center Arena; 3,138
Wednesday, May 11	8:00 p.m.	New York	@	Chicago	CBSSN	50–83	Evans (15)	4 tied (6)	Tied (6)	Wintrust Arena; 4,935
Wednesday, May 11	10:00 p.m.	Seattle	@	Phoenix	Amazon Prime	77–97	Loyd (26)	Charles (11)	3 tied (6)	Footprint Center; 6,098
Friday, May 13	7:00 p.m.	Dallas	@	Washington		94–86	Ogunbowale (27)	Harrison (10)	Harris (10)	Entertainment and Sports Arena; 3,281
Friday, May 13	7:30 p.m.	Las Vegas	@	Atlanta		96–73	McDonald (20)	Hamby (13)	Plum (11)	Gateway Center Arena; 3,138
Friday, May 13	8:00 p.m.	Indiana	@	New York	USA: Twitter; Canada: NBA TV Canada	92–86 (OT)	Ionescu (31)	N. Smith (17)	Ionescu (7)	Barclays Center; 3,289
Saturday, May 14
Saturday, May 14	3:00 p.m.	Phoenix	@	Seattle	USA: ABC; Canada: TSN2	69–64	Loyd (26)	Tied (14)	Diggins-Smith (5)	Climate Pledge Arena; 12,453
Saturday, May 14	7:00 p.m.	Los Angeles	@	Connecticut	Facebook	60–77	A. Thomas (23)	Jo. Jones (12)	A. Thomas (5)	Mohegan Sun Arena; 5,624
Saturday, May 14	8:00 p.m.	Chicago	@	Minnesota	USA: NBA TV; Canada: NBA TV Canada	82–78	Milić (18)	Fowles (11)	Vandersloot (11)	Target Center; 6,503
Sunday, May 15	2:00 p.m.	Dallas	@	New York		81–71	Ogunbowale (21)	Thornton (10)	Ionescu (6)	Barclays Center; 3,095
Sunday, May 15	3:00 p.m.	Atlanta	@	Indiana	Amazon Prime	85–79	R. Howard (33)	Egbo (9)	Tied (4)	Gainbridge Fieldhouse; 1,745
Tuesday, May 17	7:00 p.m.	Connecticut	@	New York		92–65	Tied (16)	Dolson (7)	Ionescu (4)	Barclays Center; 3,054
Tuesday, May 17	7:00 p.m.	Atlanta	@	Indiana	USA: League Pass; Canada: TSN5	101–79	R. Howard (19)	Engstler (10)	3 tied (5)	Gainbridge Fieldhouse; 960
Tuesday, May 17	8:00 p.m.	Washington	@	Dallas	CBSSN	84–68	Austin (20)	Tied (8)	Cloud (7)	College Park Center; 3,035
Tuesday, May 17	10:00 p.m.	Phoenix	@	Las Vegas	CBSSN	74–86	Plum (20)	Wilson (10)	C. Gray (9)	Michelob Ultra Arena; 2,536
Tuesday, May 17	10:30 p.m.	Minnesota	@	Los Angeles	USA: League Pass; Canada: NBA TV Canada	87–84	McBride (24)	Fowles (12)	Tied (6)	Crypto.com Arena; 4,701
Wednesday, May 18	10:00 p.m.	Chicago	@	Seattle	Facebook	71–74	Magbegor (21)	Ca. Parker (9)	Vandersloot (12)	Climate Pledge Arena; 7,450
Thursday, May 19
Thursday, May 19	10:00 p.m.	Minnesota	@	Las Vegas		87–93	Tied (25)	Shepard (14)	Tied (7)	Michelob Ultra Arena; 3,640
Thursday, May 19	10:00 p.m.	Dallas	@	Phoenix		94–84	Ogunbowale (37)	Tied (11)	Mabrey (10)	Footprint Center; 6,151
Friday, May 20
Friday, May 20	7:00 p.m.	Indiana	@	Connecticut		85–94	Mitchell (23)	Jo. Jones (8)	Robinson (6)	Mohegan Sun Arena; 4,428
Friday, May 20	7:30 p.m.	Washington	@	Atlanta	Twitter	78–73	R. Howard (21)	Coffey (10)	Tied (5)	Gateway Center Arena; N/A
Friday, May 20	10:00 p.m.	Los Angeles	@	Seattle		80–83	Stewart (28)	Magbegor (11)	Bird (8)	Climate Pledge Arena; 10,103
Saturday, May 21	3:00 p.m.	Phoenix	@	Las Vegas	USA: ABC; Canada: TSN2	80–100	Plum (24)	Plaisance (9)	Taurasi (7)	Michelob Ultra Arena; 5,572
Saturday, May 21	8:00 p.m.	Minnesota	@	Dallas		78–94	Mabrey (22)	Fowles (9)	Ogunbowale (7)	College Park Center; 3,813
Sunday, May 22
Sunday, May 22	2:00 p.m.	Connecticut	@	Indiana	ESPN3	92–70	Tied (18)	Jo. Jones (9)	A. Thomas (6)	Gainbridge Fieldhouse; 2,612
Sunday, May 22	3:00 p.m.	Chicago	@	Washington	USA: ABC; Canada: NBA TV Canada	82–73	Atkins (20)	Ca. Parker (13)	Tied (10)	Entertainment and Sports Arena; 4,200
Monday, May 23
Monday, May 23	10:00 p.m.	Los Angeles	@	Las Vegas	Facebook	76–104	Wilson (24)	Young (9)	Canada (9)	Michelob Ultra Arena; 4,092
Tuesday, May 24	7:00 p.m.	Dallas	@	Connecticut	USA: League Pass; Canada: TSN5	85–77	Mabrey (20)	Jo. Jones (12)	A. Thomas (9)	Mohegan Sun Arena; 4,180
Tuesday, May 24	7:00 p.m.	Atlanta	@	Washington		50–70	Delle Donne (15)	3 tied (7)	Cloud (7)	Entertainment and Sports Arena; 2,687
Tuesday, May 24	8:00 p.m.	Indiana	@	Chicago		90–95	K. Mitchell (25)	Engstler (13)	Tied (7)	Wintrust Arena; 7,741
Tuesday, May 24	8:00 p.m.	New York	@	Minnesota		78–84	N. Howard (23)	Fowles (14)	Whitcomb (9)	Target Center; 6,104
Wednesday, May 25
Wednesday, May 25	10:30 p.m.	Phoenix	@	Los Angeles	Amazon Prime	94–99	Diggins-Smith (28)	Tied (7)	DeShields (9)	Crypto.com Arena; 4,020
Thursday, May 26	7:00 p.m.	Dallas	@	Connecticut		68–99	Tied (18)	Tied (7)	Hideman (6)	Mohegan Sun Arena; 4,308
Friday, May 27	7:00 p.m.	Los Angeles	@	Indiana	Twitter	96–101	N. Ogwumike (30)	N. Ogwumike (10)	Robinson (11)	Indiana Farmers Coliseum; 1,417
Friday, May 27	10:00 p.m.	New York	@	Seattle	USA: League Pass; Canada: NBA TV Canada	71–79	Stewart (31)	4 tied (9)	Whitcomb (8)	Climate Pledge Arena; 10,001
Saturday, May 28	3:00 p.m.	Las Vegas	@	Chicago	USA: ABC; Canada: SN360	83–76	Wilson (22)	Wilson (16)	3 tied (6)	Wintrust Arena; 6,812
Saturday, May 28	7:00 p.m.	Washington	@	Connecticut	USA: NBA TV; Canada: NBA TV Canada	71–79	3 tied (14)	A. Thomas (10)	C. Williams (7)	Mohegan Sun Arena; 5,482
Sunday, May 29	12:00 p.m.	Phoenix	@	Atlanta	CBS	54–81	DeShields (23)	Ch. Parker (10)	R. Howard (6)	Gateway Center Arena; 3,138
Sunday, May 29	6:00 p.m.	New York	@	Seattle	USA: League Pass; Canada: NBA TV Canada	61–92	Loyd (22)	Lavender (10)	Loyd (6)	Climate Pledge Arena; 10,228
Sunday, May 29	7:00 p.m.	Los Angeles	@	Minnesota	Amazon Prime	85–83	Carter (20)	Fowles (7)	3 tied (4)	Target Center; 7,234
Tuesday, May 31
Tuesday, May 31	7:00 p.m.	Washington	@	Indiana	ESPN3	87–75	Atkins (28)	E. Williams (15)	Cloud (9)	Indiana Farmers Coliseum; 1,009
Tuesday, May 31	7:00 p.m.	Phoenix	@	Chicago	USA: ESPN2; Canada: TSN4/5	70–73	Charles (25)	Ca. Parker (11)	Diggins-Smith (8)	Wintrust Arena; 5,133
Tuesday, May 31	9:00 p.m.	Connecticut	@	Las Vegas	USA: ESPN; Canada: TSN4/5	81–89	Wilson (24)	Wilson (14)	Plum (7)	Michelob Ultra Arena; 4,693
Tuesday, May 31	10:30 p.m.	Dallas	@	Los Angeles	ESPN3	91–93	Sykes (25)	N. Ogwumike (10)	Tied (6)	Crypto.com Arena; 4,852

June

Date	Time (ET)	Matchup			TV	Result	High points	High rebounds	High assists	Location
Wednesday, June 1	7:00 p.m.	Minnesota	@	Atlanta	USA: League Pass; Canada: SN360	76–84	R. Howard (22)	Fowles (20)	Wheeler (9)	Gateway Center Arena; 1,268
Wednesday, June 1	7:00 p.m.	Indiana	@	New York	CBSSN	74–87	Ionescu (23)	Dolson (8)	Dolson (7)	Barclays Center; 4,079
Thursday, June 2	10:00 p.m.	Connecticut	@	Las Vegas	Facebook	97–90	Young (26)	A. Thomas (12)	Plum (8)	Michelob Ultra Arena; 3,801
Friday, June 3
Friday, June 3	7:00 p.m.	New York	@	Washington	Twitter	74–70	Ionescu (24)	Tied (8)	Cloud (8)	Entertainment and Sports Arena; 3,857
Friday, June 3	7:30 p.m.	Chicago	@	Atlanta		73–65	Copper (21)	Copper (8)	Vandersloot (6)	Gateway Center Arena; 3,138
Friday, June 3	10:00 p.m.	Connecticut	@	Phoenix	CBSSN	92–88	Taurasi (32)	A. Thomas (10)	A. Thomas (7)	Footprint Center; 7,180
Friday, June 3	10:00 p.m.	Dallas	@	Seattle		68–51	Stewart (27)	Sabally (11)	January (7)	Climate Pledge Arena; 8,023
Sunday, June 5	2:00 p.m.	Minnesota	@	New York		84–77	Ionescu (31)	Fowles (8)	Ionescu (7)	Barclays Center; 4,119
Sunday, June 5	3:00 p.m.	Indiana	@	Atlanta		66–75	K. Mitchell (20)	Coffey (10)	Henderson (5)	Gateway Center Arena; 3,000
Sunday, June 5	6:00 p.m.	Washington	@	Chicago	Amazon Prime	82–91	Hawkins (21)	Ca. Parker (13)	Machida (9)	Wintrust Arena; 6,228
Sunday, June 5	6:00 p.m.	Dallas	@	Las Vegas		78–84	Plum (32)	Thornton (15)	3 tied (5)	Michelob Ultra Arena; 4,814
Sunday, June 5	6:00 p.m.	Los Angeles	@	Phoenix	USA: League Pass; Canada: SN360	74–81	Diggins-Smith (29)	B. Turner (9)	Taurasi (7)	Footprint Center; 10,151
Sunday, June 5	6:00 p.m.	Connecticut	@	Seattle		93–86	J. Jones (25)	A. Thomas (8)	A. Thomas (12)	Climate Pledge Arena; 11,330
Tuesday, June 7	8:00 p.m.	Minnesota	@	New York	CBSSN	69–88	Ionescu (26)	Ionescu (8)	Ionescu (8)	Barclays Center; 3,196
Tuesday, June 7	10:00 p.m.	Atlanta	@	Seattle	CBSSN	60–72	Loyd (26)	Ch. Parker (10)	Bird (6)	Climate Pledge Arena; 7,262
Wednesday, June 8	7:00 p.m.	Indiana	@	Connecticut	USA: League Pass; Canada: NBA TV Canada	69–88	N. Smith (19)	3 tied (9)	Tied (5)	Mohegan Sun Arena; 4,088
Wednesday, June 8	8:00 p.m.	Chicago	@	Washington	CBSSN	82–84	Atkins (19)	Ca. Parker (9)	3 tied (5)	Entertainment and Sports Arena; 2,984
Friday, June 10
Friday, June 10	7:00 p.m.	Chicago	@	Connecticut	Twitter	83–79	Meesseman (26)	J. Jones (14)	Tied (8)	Mohegan Sun Arena; 4,816
Friday, June 10	7:00 p.m.	New York	@	Indiana		97–83	N. Howard (25)	N. Howard (10)	Ionescu (7)	Indiana Farmers Coliseum; 1,393
Friday, June 10	8:00 p.m.	Seattle	@	Dallas	CBSSN	89–88	Stewart (32)	Stewart (11)	G. Williams (9)	College Park Center; 3,292
Friday, June 10	8:00 p.m.	Washington	@	Minnesota	USA: League Pass; Canada: NBA TV Canada	76–59	Hines-Allen (17)	Shepard (15)	Cloud (8)	Target Center; 6,315
Friday, June 10	10:00 p.m.	Atlanta	@	Phoenix	CBSSN	88–90	R. Howard (25)	Tied (13)	Taurasi (6)	Footprint Center; 7,650
Saturday, June 11
Saturday, June 11	9:00 p.m.	Las Vegas	@	Los Angeles	Facebook	89–72	Wilson (35)	Wilson (11)	Tied (8)	Crypto.com Arena; 8,200
Sunday, June 12
Sunday, June 12	2:00 p.m.	Chicago	@	New York	Amazon Prime	88–86	Ionescu (27)	Ionescu (13)	Ionescu (12)	Barclays Center; 4,810
Sunday, June 12	4:00 p.m.	Seattle	@	Dallas		84–79	Stewart (25)	Thornton (14)	Bird (7)	College Park Center; 3,273
Sunday, June 12	6:00 p.m.	Phoenix	@	Washington		99–90 (OT)	Diggins-Smith (27)	Tied (10)	Tied (7)	Entertainment and Sports Arena; 4,200
Sunday, June 12	7:00 p.m.	Indiana	@	Minnesota	USA: League Pass; Canada: SN360, NBA TV Canada	84–80	Milić (23)	N. Smith (14)	Powers (7)	Target Center; 6,806
Tuesday, June 14	7:00 p.m.	Phoenix	@	Washington	USA: ESPN; Canada: TSN1	65–83	DeShields (21)	Austin (10)	Cloud (10)	Entertainment and Sports Arena; 3,088
Tuesday, June 14	9:00 p.m.	Seattle	@	Minnesota	USA: ESPN; Canada: NBA TV Canada	81–79	Stewart (29)	G. Williams (10)	G. Williams (8)	Target Center; 6,031
Wednesday, June 15
Wednesday, June 15	1:00 p.m.	Las Vegas	@	Dallas		92–84	Ogunbowale (28)	Hamby (12)	C. Gray (8)	College Park Center; 4,375
Wednesday, June 15	7:00 p.m.	Atlanta	@	Connecticut		92–105	Durr (21)	Tied (9)	A. Thomas (6)	Mohegan Sun Arena; 4,014
Wednesday, June 15	7:00 p.m.	Phoenix	@	Indiana	USA: League Pass; Canada: TSN3/5	93–80	Charles (29)	N. Smith (14)	Peddy (7)	Indiana Farmers Coliseum; 1,824
Thursday, June 16
Thursday, June 16	7:00 p.m.	Washington	@	New York		65–77	N. Howard (27)	N. Howard (7)	Ionescu (9)	Entertainment and Sports Arena; 4,168
Friday, June 17	7:00 p.m.	Seattle	@	Connecticut	CBSSN	71–82	Bonner (20)	J. Jones (13)	A. Thomas (8)	Mohegan Sun Arena; 7,088
Friday, June 17	8:00 p.m.	Phoenix	@	Dallas	Twitter	88–93	Charles (27)	McCowan (10)	Diggins-Smith (10)	College Park Center; 3,140
Friday, June 17	8:00 p.m.	Atlanta	@	Chicago	Facebook	100–106 (OT)	Copper (23)	Meesseman (12)	R. Howard (7)	Wintrust Arena; 7,435
Sunday, June 19	12:00 p.m.	Seattle	@	New York	USA: ESPN; Canada: SN360	81–72	Tied (23)	N. Howard (11)	Ionescu (10)	Barclays Center; 6,859
Sunday, June 19	2:00 p.m.	Connecticut	@	Washington	CBS	63–71	Tied (15)	J. Jones (16)	Atkins (6)	Entertainment and Sports Arena; 3,959
Sunday, June 19	3:00 p.m.	Chicago	@	Indiana		87–89	Copper (28)	N. Smith (11)	K. Mitchell (9)	Indiana Farmers Coliseum; 1,706
Sunday, June 19	4:00 p.m.	Los Angeles	@	Dallas	Amazon Prime	82–92	Ogunbowale (27)	A. Gray (12)	A. Gray (6)	College Park Center; 3,779
Sunday, June 19	6:00 p.m.	Minnesota	@	Las Vegas	CBSSN	95–96	Wilson (25)	Shepard (19)	C. Gray (8)	Michelob Ultra Arena; 4,603
Tuesday, June 21	7:00 p.m.	Dallas	@	Atlanta	USA: NBA TV; Canada: NBA TV Canada	75–80	Tied (18)	R. Howard (8)	McDonald (5)	Gateway Center Arena
Tuesday, June 21	10:00 p.m.	Chicago	@	Las Vegas	CBSSN	104–95	Vandersloot (25)	Wilson (11)	Vandersloot (8)	Michelob Ultra Arena; 4,951
Tuesday, June 21	10:00 p.m.	Minnesota	@	Phoenix	USA: NBA TV; Canada: NBA TV Canada	84–71	Diggins-Smith (25)	Shepard (13)	Jefferson (9)	Footprint Center; 6,394
Tuesday, June 21	10:30 p.m.	Washington	@	Los Angeles		82–84	Atkins (22)	C. Ogwumike (9)	Cloud (13)	Crypto.com Arena; 3,745
Wednesday, June 22
Wednesday, June 22	7:00 p.m.	New York	@	Connecticut	USA: ESPN2; Canada: TSN3	81–77	Tied (16)	Tied (11)	Ionescu (6)	Mohegan Sun Arena; 4,652
Thursday, June 23	8:00 p.m.	Indiana	@	Dallas	CBSSN	68–94	Ogunbowale (24)	Egbo (12)	Ogunbowale (6)	College Park Center; 2,791
Thursday, June 23	8:00 p.m.	Phoenix	@	Minnesota	Facebook	88–100	Charles (26)	Fowles (10)	Powers (6)	Target Center; 8,004
Thursday, June 23	10:00 p.m.	Washington	@	Seattle	CBSSN	71–85	Loyd (22)	Tied (9)	Tied (8)	Climate Pledge Arena; 9,884
Thursday, June 23	10:30 p.m.	Chicago	@	Los Angeles	Facebook	82–59	3 tied (15)	Ca. Parker (14)	Ca. Parker (10)	Crypto.com Arena; 5,627
Friday, June 24
Friday, June 24	7:30 p.m.	New York	@	Atlanta	CBSSN	89–77	Durr (23)	N. Howard (10)	Ionescu (8)	Gateway Center Arena; 2,697
Saturday, June 25	8:00 p.m.	Phoenix	@	Dallas	USA: NBA TV; Canada: NBA TV Canada	83–72	Diggins-Smith (26)	Tied (10)	Tied (6)	College Park Center; 4,240
Saturday, June 25	9:00 p.m.	Los Angeles	@	Seattle	Facebook	85–77	Stewart (28)	Tied (8)	Sykes (8)	Climate Pledge Arena; 9,955
Saturday, June 25	10:00 p.m.	Washington	@	Las Vegas	USA: NBA TV; Canada: NBA TV Canada	87–86 (OT)	3 tied (20)	Wilson (14)	Cloud (10)	Michelob Ultra Arena; 7,171
Sunday, June 26
Sunday, June 26	3:00 p.m.	Connecticut	@	Atlanta	Amazon Prime	72–61	Tied (17)	A. Thomas (11)	A. Thomas (8)	Gateway Center Arena; 2,722
Sunday, June 26	6:00 p.m.	Minnesota	@	Chicago	CBSSN	85–88	Vandersloot (18)	Tied (8)	Tied (7)	Wintrust Arena; 7,022
Monday, June 27	10:00 p.m.	Indiana	@	Phoenix	Amazon Prime	71–83	Taurasi (27)	N. Smith (10)	Peddy (5)	Footprint Center; 5,044
Monday, June 27	10:30 p.m.	Las Vegas	@	Los Angeles	USA: NBA TV; Canada: NBA TV Canada	79–73	Plum (29)	3 tied (11)	Tied (7)	Crypto.com Arena; 4,200
Tuesday, June 28	7:00 p.m.	Atlanta	@	Washington	USA: ESPN2; Canada: NBA TV Canada	74–92	Cloud (18)	Tied (7)	Machia (5)	Entertainment and Sports Arena; 3,517
Tuesday, June 28	8:00 p.m.	Dallas	@	Minnesota	ESPN3	64–92	Powers (20)	Achonwa (13)	Jefferson (10)	Target Center; 5,603
Wednesday, June 29
Wednesday, June 29	12:00 p.m.	Connecticut	@	Chicago	USA: NBA TV; Canada: NBA TV Canada	83–91	Ca. Parker (25)	Tied (11)	Tied (7)	Wintrust Arena; 6,709
Wednesday, June 29	10:00 p.m.	Indiana	@	Phoenix	USA: NBA TV; Canada: NBA TV Canada	78–99	K. Mitchell (21)	B. Turner (11)	Tied (7)	Footprint Center; 5,833
Wednesday, June 29	10:00 p.m.	Las Vegas	@	Seattle	Amazon Prime	78–88	Loyd (24)	Wilson (16)	Gray (8)	Climate Pledge Arena; 9,499
Thursday, June 30
Thursday, June 30	7:00 p.m.	Atlanta	@	New York	Twitter	92–81 (OT)	Hayes (21)	Ionescu (13)	Wheeler (8)	Barclays Center; 6,161

July

Date	Time (ET)	Matchup			TV	Result	High points	High rebounds	High assists	Location
Friday, July 1	8:00 p.m.	Los Angeles	@	Dallas	CBSSN	97–89	Ogunbowale (23)	Cambage (11)	Toliver (7)	College Park Center; 3,187
Friday, July 1	8:00 p.m.	Las Vegas	@	Minnesota	USA: NBA TV; Canada: NBA TV Canada	91–85	Banham (24)	Wilson (12)	Plum (10)	Target Center; 6,104
Friday, July 1	10:00 p.m.	Indiana	@	Seattle	Facebook	57–73	Stewart (20)	Egbo (12)	Loyd	Climate Pledge Arena; 8,565
Saturday, July 2	1:00 p.m.	Phoenix	@	Chicago	USA: ESPN; Canada: SN1	75–91	Diggins-Smith (25)	DeShields (9)	Ca. Parker (7)	Wintrust Arena; 8,028
Sunday, July 3	1:00 p.m.	Washington	@	Connecticut	USA: ESPN; Canada: SN1	72–74 (OT)	A. Thomas (23)	Hines-Allen (13)	Cloud (6)	Mohegan Sun Arena; 5,814
Sunday, July 3	3:00 p.m.	Seattle	@	Atlanta	NBA TV	76–90	Ch. Parker (21)	Billings (10)	Wallace (6)	Gateway Center Arena; 3,138
Sunday, July 3	6:00 p.m.	New York	@	Los Angeles	CBSSN	74–84	N. Ogwumike (22)	C. Ogwumike (10)	Ionescu (8)	Crypto.com Arena; 5,436
Sunday, July 3	7:00 p.m.	Las Vegas	@	Minnesota	Amazon Prime	71–102	Powers (32)	Fowles (11)	Jefferson (6)	Target Center; 7,603
Monday, July 4	7:00 p.m.	Phoenix	@	Los Angeles	USA: ESPN; Canada: NBA TV Canada	75–78	N. Ogwumike (23)	N. Ogwumike (9)	Taurasi (6)	Crypto.com Arena; 3,340
Tuesday, July 5	7:00 p.m.	Seattle	@	Indiana		95–73	Loyd (25)	Magbegor (11)	Bird (5)	Indiana Farmers Coliseum; 2,585
Tuesday, July 5	8:00 p.m.	Connecticut	@	Dallas	Facebook	71–82	C. Williams (25)	Gray (8)	A. Thomas (6)	College Park Center; 3,445
Wednesday, July 6	1:00 p.m.	Chicago	@	Minnesota	USA: NBA TV; Canada: NBA TV Canada	78–81	Powers (22)	Powers (11)	Tied (6)	Target Center; 11,103
Wednesday, July 6	8:00 p.m.	Washington	@	Atlanta	CBSSN	85–66	Delle Donne (26)	Billings (9)	Tied (4)	Gateway Center Arena; 1,810
Wednesday, July 6	10:00 p.m.	New York	@	Las Vegas	CBSSN	116–107	Ionescu (31)	Ionescu (13)	Ionescu (10)	Michelob Ultra Arena; 8,405
Thursday, July 7	7:00 p.m.	Chicago	@	Indiana	USA: League Pass; Canada: TSN5	93–84	K. Mitchell (27)	N. Smith (11)	Vandersloot (6)	Indiana Farmers Coliseum; 1,839
Thursday, July 7	10:00 p.m.	New York	@	Phoenix	Facebook	81–84	Tied (23)	Ionescu (10)	Diggins-Smith (9)	Footprint Center; 6,158
Thursday, July 7	10:30 p.m.	Seattle	@	Los Angeles	Twitter	106–69	Stewart (23)	Magbegor (11)	Loyd (7)	Crypto.com Arena; 6,389
Sunday, July 10	1:00 p.m.	WNBA All-Star Game			USA: ABC; Canada: TSN3, SN1	134–112	Plum (30)	J. Jones (13)	Vandersloot (8)	Wintrust Arena; 9,572
Tuesday, July 12	3:00 p.m.	Dallas	@	Seattle	Facebook	74–83	Stewart (19)	McCowan (10)	Bird (7)	Climate Pledge Arena; 9,486
Tuesday, July 12	7:00 p.m.	Las Vegas	@	New York		107–101	Tied (27)	Wilson (14)	Young (7)	Barclays Center; 5,201
Tuesday, July 12	8:00 p.m.	Atlanta	@	Chicago	USA: League Pass; Canada: TSN1/4	75–90	Ca. Parker (31)	Ca. Parker (11)	Meesseman (8)	Wintrust Arena; 7,074
Tuesday, July 12	8:00 p.m.	Phoenix	@	Minnesota		107–118 (2OT)	Cunningham (36)	Fowles (14)	Diggins-Smith (10)	Target Center; 6,503
Tuesday, July 12	10:30 p.m.	Washington	@	Los Angeles		94–81	Delle Donne (26)	C. Ogwumike (10)	Cloud (9)	Crypto.com Arena; 5,004
Wednesday, July 13	12:00 p.m.	Connecticut	@	Indiana	NBA TV	89–81	K. Mitchell (21)	J. Jones (14)	A. Thomas (7)	Indiana Farmers Coliseum; 3,212
Thursday, July 14	11:00 a.m.	Las Vegas	@	New York	USA: NBA TV; Canada: SN1	108–74	Wilson (25)	N. Howard (9)	Young (9)	Barclays Center; 9,896
Thursday, July 14	8:00 p.m.	Dallas	@	Minnesota	Twitter	92–87	Ogunbowale (32)	Fowles (17)	Harris (6)	Target Center; 4,834
Thursday, July 14	10:00 p.m.	Washington	@	Phoenix		75–80	Taurasi (29)	Delle Donne (12)	Diggins-Smith (9)	Footprint Center; 5,994
Thursday, July 14	10:30 p.m.	Chicago	@	Los Angeles	Facebook	80–68	Gardner (18)	C. Ogwumike (13)	Canada (8)	Crypto.com Arena; 5,856
Friday, July 15	7:00 p.m.	Minnesota	@	Indiana	CBSSN	87–77	McBride (28)	Fowles (12)	Tied (5)	Indiana Farmers Coliseum; 1,530
Friday, July 15	7:30 p.m.	Connecticut	@	Atlanta	USA: League Pass; Canada: TSN2	93–68	J. Jones (21)	Hillmon (11)	Wheeler (6)	Gateway Center Arena; 2,962
Saturday, July 16	8:00 p.m.	Chicago	@	Dallas	CBSSN	89–81	Tied (23)	Copper (14)	Allemand (8)	College Park Center; 5,126
Sunday, July 17	1:00 p.m.	Las Vegas	@	Connecticut	USA: ABC; Canada: TSN2	91–83	Plum (22)	A. Thomas (14)	C. Gray (9)	Mohegan Sun Arena; 6,814
Sunday, July 17	3:00 p.m.	Minnesota	@	Washington	Facebook	57–70	Delle Donne (21)	Tied (12)	Cloud (8)	Entertainment and Sports Arena; 4,200
Sunday, July 17	6:00 p.m.	Atlanta	@	Phoenix	Amazon Prime	85–75	Taurasi (23)	Ch. Parker (12)	Wheeler (7)	Footprint Center; 7,963
Sunday, July 17	6:00 p.m.	Indiana	@	Seattle	CBSSN	65–81	Stewart (25)	N. Smith (9)	Bird (6)	Climate Pledge Arena; 9,970
Tuesday, July 19	11:30 a.m.	New York	@	Connecticut	USA: NBA TV; Canada: NBA TV Canada	63–82	B. Jones (21)	A. Thomas (13)	C. Williams (6)	Mohegan Sun Arena; 6,288
Tuesday, July 19	10:00 p.m.	Atlanta	@	Las Vegas	USA: NBA TV; Canada: NBA TV Canada	92–76	Hayes (31)	Tied (10)	Plum (7)	Michelob Ultra Arena; 5,952
Tuesday, July 19	10:30 p.m.	Indiana	@	Los Angeles	CBSSN	79–86	N. Ogwumike (35)	C. Ogwumike (10)	Canada (8)	Crypto.com Arena; 5,478
Wednesday, July 20	12:00 p.m.	Seattle	@	Chicago	USA: NBA TV; Canada: NBA TV Canada	74–78	Stewart (24)	Meesseman (10)	Meesseman (6)	Wintrust Arena; 8,893
Thursday, July 21	11:30 a.m.	New York	@	Washington	USA: NBA TV; Canada: NBA TV Canada	69–78	Delle Donne (25)	N. Howard (10)	Tied (5)	Capital One Arena; 7,431
Thursday, July 21	3:30 p.m.	Atlanta	@	Los Angeles	USA: NBA TV; Canada: NBA TV Canada	78–85	N. Ogwumike (20)	R. Howard (9)	Canada (7)	Crypto.com Arena; 10,021
Thursday, July 21	10:00 p.m.	Indiana	@	Las Vegas	USA: NBA TV; Canada: NBA TV Canada	77–90	Smith (23)	Hamby (9)	C. Gray (12)	Michelob Ultra Arena; 5,737
Friday, July 22	8:00 p.m.	Connecticut	@	Minnesota	USA: NBA TV; Canada: NBA TV Canada	94–84	Bonner (20)	A. Thomas (10)	A. Thomas (12)	Target Center; 8,321
Friday, July 22	8:00 p.m.	Dallas	@	Chicago	CBSSN	83–89	Ogunbowale (28)	Ca. Parker (10)	Meesseman (9)	Wintrust Arena; 7,014
Friday, July 22	10:00 p.m.	Seattle	@	Phoenix	USA: NBA TV; Canada: NBA TV Canada	78–94	Diggins-Smith (35)	Stewart (14)	Taurasi (7)	Footprint Center; 14,162
Saturday, July 23	7:00 p.m.	Chicago	@	New York	USA: NBA TV; Canada: SN360	80–83	Ca. Parker (21)	Ca. Parker (11)	Ionescu (9)	Barclays Center; 6,926
Saturday, July 23	10:00 p.m.	Los Angeles	@	Las Vegas	USA: NBA TV; Canada: NBA TV Canada	66–84	Plum (29)	Young (9)	Young (6)	Michelob Ultra Arena; 7,522
Sunday, July 24	3:00 p.m.	Dallas	@	Indiana	USA: NBA TV; Canada: TSN4	96–86	K. Mitchell (34)	Thornton (8)	K. Mitchell (6)	Hinkle Fieldhouse; 1,159
Sunday, July 24	6:00 p.m.	Atlanta	@	Seattle	USA: NBA TV; Canada: NBA TV Canada	72–82	Charles (27)	Charles (15)	Bird (5)	Climate Pledge Arena; 12,654
Sunday, July 24	7:00 p.m.	Connecticut	@	Minnesota	Amazon Prime	86–79	Hiedeman (19)	A. Thomas (10)	Bonner (8)	Target Center; 7,231
Tuesday, July 26
Tuesday, July 26	8:30 p.m.	Las Vegas	@	Chicago	Amazon Prime	93–83	Plum (24)	Wilson (17)	Tied (6)	Wintrust Arena; 8,922
Thursday, July 28	7:00 p.m.	Minnesota	@	Atlanta	USA: Twitter; Canada: NBA TV Canada	92–85	Powers (25)	Fowles (14)	Jefferson (7)	Gateway Center Arena; 2,396
Thursday, July 28	7:00 p.m.	Seattle	@	Connecticut	USA: NBA TV; Canada: SN1	83–88	A. Thomas (19)	Tied (10)	A. Thomas (11)	Mohegan Sun Arena; 9,137
Thursday, July 28	8:00 p.m.	Washington	@	Dallas	CBSSN	87–77	McCowan (27)	McCowan (11)	Cloud (7)	College Park Center; 4,382
Thursday, July 28	10:00 p.m.	Los Angeles	@	Phoenix	CBSSN	80–90	Taurasi (30)	N. Ogwumike (11)	Diggins-Smith (6)	Footprint Center; 8,124
Friday, July 29	7:00 p.m.	Las Vegas	@	Indiana	USA: NBA TV; Canada: NBA TV Canada	93–72	Tied (22)	N. Smith (10)	Tied (5)	Hinkle Fieldhouse; 1,828
Friday, July 29	8:00 p.m.	New York	@	Chicago	CBSSN	81–89	Vandersloot (23)	Copper (11)	Vandersloot (9)	Wintrust Arena; 6,924
Saturday, July 30	12:00 p.m.	Seattle	@	Washington	USA: ESPN; Canada: TSN1/3	82–77	Delle Donne (22)	Tied (10)	Cloud (11)	Entertainment and Sports Arena; 4,200
Saturday, July 30	7:30 p.m.	Dallas	@	Atlanta	USA: NBA TV; Canada: NBA TV Canada	81–68	R. Howard (22)	McCowan (14)	Tied (8)	Gateway Center Arena; 3,138
Sunday, July 31	1:00 p.m.	Chicago	@	Connecticut	USA: NBA TV; Canada: TSN4	95–92 (OT)	Copper (27)	Stevens (10)	Vandersloot (12)	Mohegan Sun Arena; 6,254
Sunday, July 31	2:00 p.m.	Phoenix	@	New York	CBSSN	69–89	N. Howard (23)	Tied (12)	Ionescu (16)	Barclays Center; 6,433
Sunday, July 31	3:00 p.m.	Las Vegas	@	Indiana	USA: NBA TV; Canada: NBA TV Canada	94–69	Plum (26)	N. Smith (13)	C. Gray (7)	Hinkle Fieldhouse; 1,822
Sunday, July 31	3:00 p.m.	Seattle	@	Washington	Amazon Prime	75–78	Tied (23)	Austin (9)	Cloud (10)	Entertainment and Sports Arena; 4,200
Sunday, July 31	7:00 p.m.	Minnesota	@	Los Angeles	USA: NBA TV; Canada: NBA TV Canada	84–77	N. Ogwumike (23)	Shepard (10)	Canada (6)	Crypto.com Arena; 6,857

August

Date	Time (ET)	Matchup			TV	Result	High points	High rebounds	High assists	Location
Tuesday, August 2	7:00 p.m.	Phoenix	@	Connecticut	USA: NBA TV; Canada: TSN1/5	63–87	Hiedeman (16)	A. Thomas (12)	A. Thomas (10)	Mohegan Sun Arena; 6,130
Tuesday, August 2	7:00 p.m.	Los Angeles	@	New York	CBSSN	73–102	Ionescu (31)	N. Howard (11)	Xu (8)	Barclays Center; 4,891
Tuesday, August 2	7:00 p.m.	Las Vegas	@	Washington	Facebook	73–83	Wilson (22)	Wilson (12)	Cloud (9)	Entertainment and Sports Arena; 4,200
Tuesday, August 2	9:00 p.m.	Dallas	@	Chicago	CBSSN	84–78	Mabrey (26)	McCowan (12)	Burton (9)	Wintrust Arena; 5,602
Wednesday, August 3	7:00 p.m.	Indiana	@	Atlanta	USA: NBA TV; Canada: NBA TV Canada	81–91	N. Smith (21)	Cannon (8)	3 tied (6)	Gateway Center Arena; 2,071
Wednesday, August 3	7:00 p.m.	Los Angeles	@	New York	CBSSN	61–64	Ionescu (20)	Nelson-Ododa (10)	Canada (8)	Barclays Center; 5,315
Wednesday, August 3	10:00 p.m.	Minnesota	@	Seattle	USA: NBA TV; Canada: NBA TV Canada	77–89	Stewart (33)	Stewart (8)	Tied (6)	Climate Pledge Arena; 13,500
Thursday, August 4	7:00 p.m.	Phoenix	@	Connecticut	USA: ESPN2; Canada: SN360	64–77	Diggins-Smith (16)	A. Thomas (13)	B. Turner (7)	Mohegan Sun Arena; 6,215
Thursday, August 4	8:00 p.m.	Las Vegas	@	Dallas	ESPN3	80–82	C. Gray (28)	McCowan (16)	Plum (7)	College Park Center; 3,492
Friday, August 5	7:30 p.m.	Los Angeles	@	Atlanta	CBSSN	86–88	R. Howard (28)	Hillmon (9)	Canada (8)	Gateway Center Arena; 3,138
Friday, August 5	8:00 p.m.	Washington	@	Chicago	USA: NBA TV; Canada: NBA TV Canada	83–93	Hines-Allen (21)	3 tied (6)	Vandersloot (7)	Wintrust Arena; 8,042
Saturday, August 6	8:00 p.m.	Indiana	@	Dallas	USA: NBA TV; Canada: NBA TV Canada	91–95 (OT)	Thornton (21)	McCowan (14)	Tied (8)	College Park Center; 4,184
Saturday, August 6	10:00 p.m.	New York	@	Phoenix	USA: NBA TV; Canada: NBA TV Canada	62–76	DeShields (25)	3 tied (8)	Ionescu (5)	Footprint Center; 11,724
Sunday, August 7	1:00 p.m.	Connecticut	@	Chicago	USA: ABC; Canada: SN1	91–94	Vandersloot (20)	Ca. Parker (12)	Bonner (6)	Wintrust Arena; 8,224
Sunday, August 7	3:00 p.m.	Los Angeles	@	Washington	USA: ESPN3; Canada: NBA TV Canada	79–76	Sykes (21)	Austin (10)	Canada (12)	Entertainment and Sports Arena; 4,200
Sunday, August 7	3:00 p.m.	Las Vegas	@	Seattle	USA: ABC; Canada: TSN4	89–81	Stewart (35)	Stewart (10)	C. Gray (9)	Climate Pledge Arena; 18,100
Sunday, August 7	7:00 p.m.	Atlanta	@	Minnesota	Amazon Prime	71–81	McBride (20)	Fowles (8)	Tied (6)	Target Center; 9,421
Monday, August 8	8:00 p.m.	New York	@	Dallas	USA: NBA TV; Canada: NBA TV Canada	77–86	Ionescu (32)	McCowan (9)	3 tied (4)	College Park Center; 3,036
Tuesday, August 9	8:00 p.m.	Seattle	@	Chicago	USA: NBA TV; Canada: TSN3	111–100	Vandersloot (28)	Stewart (9)	Bird (8)	Wintrust Arena; 9,314
Tuesday, August 9	10:00 p.m.	Atlanta	@	Las Vegas	CBSSN	90–97	Wilson (24)	Wilson (14)	Plum (8)	Michelob Ultra Arena; 5,151
Tuesday, August 9	10:30 p.m.	Connecticut	@	Los Angeles	USA: NBA TV; Canada: NBA TV Canada	97–71	Jo. Jones (21)	Jo. Jones (10)	A. Thomas (7)	Crypto.com Arena; 5,789
Wednesday, August 10	8:00 p.m.	New York	@	Dallas	USA: League Pass; Canada: NBA TV Canada	91–73	Mabrey (19)	McCowan (13)	Ionescu (7)	College Park Center; 3,795
Wednesday, August 10	10:00 p.m.	Minnesota	@	Phoenix	CBSSN	86–77	Cunningham (24)	Shepard (12)	Jefferson (12)	Footprint Center; 7,307
Thursday, August 11	10:00 p.m.	Chicago	@	Las Vegas	USA: NBA TV; Canada: NBA TV Canada	78–89	Copper (28)	Ca. Parker (12)	Tied (6)	Michelob Ultra Arena; 6,055
Thursday, August 11	10:30 p.m.	Connecticut	@	Los Angeles	Twitter	93–69	Tied (18)	Tied (9)	Bonner (7)	Crypto.com Arena; 4,987
Friday, August 12	7:00 p.m.	Washington	@	Indiana	Facebook	82–70	Delle Donne (24)	Austin (11)	Tied (6)	Hinkle Fieldhouse; 1,700
Friday, August 12	7:30 p.m.	New York	@	Atlanta	CBSSN	80–70	Dangerfield (18)	N. Howard (12)	Tied (6)	Gateway Center Arena; 3,138
Friday, August 12	9:00 p.m.	Seattle	@	Minnesota	USA: ESPN2; Canada: NBA TV Canada	96–69	Charles (23)	Fowles (12)	G. Williams (7)	Target Center; 12,134
Friday, August 12	10:00 p.m.	Dallas	@	Phoenix	NBA TV	74–86	DeShields (24)	McCowan (9)	Peddy (8)	Footprint Center; 8,047
Sunday, August 14	1:00 p.m.	Minnesota	@	Connecticut	USA: ABC; Canada: SN360	83–90	L. Allen (26)	Fowles (12)	L. Allen (6)	Mohegan Sun Arena; 7,489
Sunday, August 14	2:00 p.m.	Atlanta	@	New York	ESPN3	83–87	R. Howard (24)	Dolson (12)	Tied (7)	Barclays Center; 7,561
Sunday, August 14	3:00 p.m.	Indiana	@	Washington	ESPN3	83–95	Delle Donne (22)	Austin (6)	T. Mitchell (7)	Entertainment and Sports Arena; 4,200
Sunday, August 14	3:00 p.m.	Seattle	@	Las Vegas	USA: ABC; Canada: NBA TV Canada	100–109	Loyd (38)	Stewart (15)	C. Gray (9)	Michelob Ultra Arena; 10,015
Sunday, August 14	5:00 p.m.	Chicago	@	Phoenix	Amazon Prime Video	82–67	Stevens (17)	Gustafson (10)	Allemand (6)	Footprint Center; 12,383
Sunday, August 14	7:00 p.m.	Dallas	@	Los Angeles	USA: NBA TV; Canada: NBA TV Canada	116–88	Sykes (35)	McCowan (8)	Harris (11)	Crypto.com Arena; 7,245

2022 WNBA playoffs
Round One

Date	Time (ET)	Matchup			TV	Result	High points	High rebounds	High assists	Location
Wednesday, August 17	8:00 p.m.	New York	@	Chicago	USA: ESPN2; Canada: SN360	98–91	Tied (22)	Ca. Parker (10)	Vandersloot (10)	Wintrust Arena; 7,524
Wednesday, August 17	10:00 p.m.	Phoenix	@	Las Vegas	USA: ESPN; Canada: NBA TV Canada	63–79	Plum (22)	B. Turner (16)	Peddy (5)	Michelob Ultra Arena; 8,725
Thursday, August 18	8:00 p.m.	Dallas	@	Connecticut	USA: ESPNU, NBA TV; Canada: TSN2	68–93	Jo. Jones (19)	A. Thomas (10)	A. Thomas (7)	Mohegan Sun Arena; 4,797
Thursday, August 18	10:00 p.m.	Washington	@	Seattle	USA: ESPN2; Canada: TSN2	83–86	Delle Donne (26)	Stewart (12)	G. Williams (6)	Climate Pledge Arena; 8,917
Saturday, August 20	12:00 p.m.	New York	@	Chicago	USA: ESPN; Canada: NBA TV Canada	62–100	Copper (20)	Ca. Parker (12)	Quigley (8)	Wintrust Arena; 7,732
Saturday, August 20	9:00 p.m.	Phoenix	@	Las Vegas	USA: ESPN2; Canada: NBA TV Canada	80–117	C. Gray (27)	B. Turner (7)	C. Gray (8)	Michelob Ultra Arena; 9,126
Sunday, August 21	12:00 p.m.	Dallas	@	Connecticut	USA: ABC; Canada: SN1	89–79	3 tied (20)	McCowan (11)	A. Gray (8)	Mohegan Sun Arena; 6,788
Sunday, August 21	4:00 p.m.	Washington	@	Seattle	USA: ESPN; Canada: NBA TV Canada	84–97	Tied (21)	Stewart (10)	Bird (10)	Climate Pledge Arena; 12,940
Tuesday, August 23	9:00 p.m.	Chicago	@	New York	USA: ESPN; Canada: TSN1/4	90–72	3 tied (15)	Ca. Parker (13)	Vandersloot (10)	Barclays Center; 7,837
Wednesday, August 24	9:00 p.m.	Connecticut	@	Dallas	USA: ESPN; Canada: TSN1/3/4	73–58	Bonner (21)	McCowan (12)	Bonner (5)	College Park Center; 5,016

Semifinals

Date	Time (ET)	Matchup			TV	Result	High points	High rebounds	High assists	Location
Sunday, August 28	4:00 p.m.	Seattle	@	Las Vegas	USA: ESPN; Canada: TSN3/4	76–73	Loyd (26)	T. Charles (18)	Bird (12)	Michelob Ultra Arena; 9,944
Sunday, August 28	8:00 p.m.	Connecticut	@	Chicago	USA: ESPN2; Canada: TSN5	68–63	Ca. Parker (19)	Ca. Parker (18)	Tied (7)	Wintrust Arena; 8,955
Wednesday, August 31	8:00 p.m.	Connecticut	@	Chicago	USA: ESPN2; Canada: NBA TV Canada	77–85	J. Jones (23)	A. Thomas (10)	Vandersloot (8)	Wintrust Arena; 8,311
Wednesday, August 31	10:00 p.m.	Seattle	@	Las Vegas	USA: ESPN2; Canada: SN360	73–78	Wilson (33)	Wilson (13)	C. Gray (7)	Michelob Ultra Arena; 9,755
Sunday, September 4	1:00 p.m.	Chicago	@	Connecticut	USA: ESPN2; Canada: NBA TV Canada	76–72	Bonner (18)	A. Thomas (13)	A. Thomas (7)	Mohegan Sun Arena; 9,142
Sunday, September 4	3:00 p.m.	Las Vegas	@	Seattle	USA: ABC; Canada: NBA TV Canada	110–98 (OT)	Wilson (34)	Stewart (15)	C. Gray (12)	Climate Pledge Arena; 15,431
Tuesday, September 6	8:00 p.m.	Chicago	@	Connecticut	USA: ESPN2; Canada: TSN3	80–104	Tied (19)	Ca. Parker (9)	Meesseman (6)	Mohegan Sun Arena; 5,868
Tuesday, September 6	10:00 p.m.	Las Vegas	@	Seattle	USA: ESPN2; Canada: TSN3	97–92	Stewart (42)	Wilson (13)	C. Gray (10)	Climate Pledge Arena; 11,328
Thursday, September 8	8:00 p.m.	Connecticut	@	Chicago	USA: ESPN2; Canada: NBA TV Canada	72–63	Copper (22)	Tied (10)	A. Thomas (8)	Wintrust Arena; 8,014

WNBA Finals

Date	Time (ET)	Matchup			TV	Result	High points	High rebounds	High assists	Location
Sunday, September 11	3:00 p.m.	Connecticut	@	Las Vegas	USA: ABC; Canada: TSN5	64–67	Wilson (24)	Tied (11)	Tied (5)	Michelob Ultra Arena; 10,135
Tuesday, September 13	9:00 p.m.	Connecticut	@	Las Vegas	USA: ESPN; Canada: TSN1/4	71–85	Wilson (26)	J. Jones (11)	C. Gray (8)	Michelob Ultra Arena; 10,211
Thursday, September 15	9:00 p.m.	Las Vegas	@	Connecticut	USA: ESPN; Canada: SN360	76–105	Young (22)	A. Thomas (15)	A. Thomas (11)	Mohegan Sun Arena; 8,745
Sunday, September 18	4:00 p.m.	Las Vegas	@	Connecticut	USA: ESPN; Canada: SN1	78–71	C. Gray (20)	Wilson (14)	A. Thomas (11)	Mohegan Sun Arena; 9,652

Note: Games highlighted in ██ represent Commissioner's Cup games.
All times Eastern

=== Statistical leaders ===
The following shows the leaders in each statistical category during the 2022 regular season through games played on August 14, 2022.

Category	Player	Team	Statistic
Points per game	Breanna Stewart	Seattle Storm	21.8 ppg
Rebounds per game	Sylvia Fowles	Minnesota Lynx	9.8 rpg
Assists per game	Natasha Cloud	Washington Mystics	7.0 apg
Steals per game	Brittney Sykes	Los Angeles Sparks	2.0 spg
Blocks per game	A'ja Wilson	Las Vegas Aces	1.9 bpg
Field goal percentage	Sylvia Fowles	Minnesota Lynx	62.2%
Three point FG percentage	Moriah Jefferson	Minnesota Lynx	47.4%
Free throw percentage	Allie Quigley	Chicago Sky	95.0%
Points per game (team)	Las Vegas Aces		90.4 ppg
Field goal percentage (team)	Chicago Sky		48.1%

== Playoffs ==
**First round** Best-of-3
**1**	**Las Vegas Aces**	**2**
8	Phoenix Mercury	0
**4**	**Seattle Storm**	**2**
5	Washington Mystics	0
**2**	**Chicago Sky**	**2**
7	New York Liberty	1
**3**	**Connecticut Sun**	**2**
6	Dallas Wings	1

**Semifinals**; Best-of-5
**1**	**Las Vegas Aces**	**3**
4	Seattle Storm	1
2	Chicago Sky	2
**3**	**Connecticut Sun**	**3**

**Finals**; Best-of-5
**1**	**Las Vegas Aces**	**3**
3	Connecticut Sun	1

- **Bold** – Series winner
- Italic – Team with home-court advantage

== Awards ==
=== Individual ===
Award		Winner	Team	Position	Votes/Statistic
Most Valuable Player (MVP)		A'ja Wilson	Las Vegas Aces	Forward	31 of 56 votes
Finals MVP		Chelsea Gray	Las Vegas Aces	Guard	
Rookie of the Year		Rhyne Howard	Atlanta Dream	Guard	53 of 56 votes
Most Improved Player		Jackie Young	Las Vegas Aces	Guard	32 of 56 votes
Defensive Player of the Year		A'ja Wilson	Las Vegas Aces	Forward	20 of 56 votes
Sixth Player of the Year		Brionna Jones	Connecticut Sun	Forward	53 of 56 votes
Kim Perrot Sportsmanship Award		Sylvia Fowles	Minnesota Lynx	Center	36 of 56 votes
Season-Long Community Assist Award		Brianna Turner	Phoenix Mercury	Forward	
Peak Performers	**Points**	Breanna Stewart	Seattle Storm	Forward	21.8 ppg
Peak Performers	**Rebounds**	Sylvia Fowles	Minnesota Lynx	Center	9.8 rpg
Peak Performers	**Assists**	Natasha Cloud	Washington Mystics	Guard	7.0 apg
Coach of the Year		Becky Hammon	Las Vegas Aces	Head Coach	27 of 56 votes
Basketball Executive of the Year		James Wade	Chicago Sky	Head Coach	11 votes

=== Team ===
Award		Members				
**All-WNBA**	**First Team**	A'ja Wilson	Breanna Stewart	Kelsey Plum	Skylar Diggins-Smith	Candace Parker
**All-WNBA**	**Second Team**	Alyssa Thomas	Sabrina Ionescu	Nneka Ogwumike	Jonquel Jones	Sylvia Fowles
**All-Defensive**	**First Team**	Natasha Cloud (G)	Ariel Atkins (G)	A'ja Wilson (F)	Breanna Stewart (F)	Sylvia Fowles (C)
**All-Defensive**	**Second Team**	Brittney Sykes (G)	Gabby Williams (F)	Alyssa Thomas (F)	Jonquel Jones (F)	Ezi Magbegor (C)
**All-Rookie Team**		Rhyne Howard	NaLyssa Smith	Shakira Austin	Queen Egbo	Rebekah Gardner

=== Players of the Week ===
Date Awarded	Eastern Conference		Western Conference		Reference
Date Awarded	Player	Team	Player	Team	Reference
May 16	Rhyne Howard	Atlanta Dream	A'ja Wilson	Las Vegas Aces	
May 23	Alyssa Thomas	Connecticut Sun	Jackie Young	Las Vegas Aces	
May 31	Kelsey Mitchell	Indiana Fever	A'ja Wilson (2)	Las Vegas Aces	
June 6	Jonquel Jones	Connecticut Sun	Kelsey Plum	Las Vegas Aces	
June 13	Sabrina Ionescu	New York Liberty	Breanna Stewart	Seattle Storm	
June 21	Kahleah Copper	Chicago Sky	A'ja Wilson (3)	Las Vegas Aces	
June 27	Courtney Vandersloot	Chicago Sky	Nneka Ogwumike	Los Angeles Sparks	
July 8	Sabrina Ionescu (2)	New York Liberty	Aerial Powers	Minnesota Lynx	
July 18	Elena Delle Donne	Washington Mystics	Skylar Diggins-Smith	Phoenix Mercury	
July 25	Alyssa Thomas (2)	Connecticut Sun	A'ja Wilson (4)	Las Vegas Aces	
August 1	Courtney Vandersloot (2)	Chicago Sky	Kelsey Plum (2)	Las Vegas Aces	
August 8	Sabrina Ionescu (4)	New York Liberty	Teaira McCowan	Dallas Wings	
August 15	Sabrina Ionescu (4)	New York Liberty	A'ja Wilson (5)	Las Vegas Aces	

=== Players of the Month ===
Month	Eastern Conference		Western Conference		Reference
Month	Player	Team	Player	Team	Reference
May	Alyssa Thomas	Connecticut Sun	A'ja Wilson	Las Vegas Aces	
June	Sabrina Ionescu	New York Liberty	Breanna Stewart	Seattle Storm	
July	Alyssa Thomas (2)	Connecticut Sun	A'ja Wilson (2)	Las Vegas Aces	
August	Sabrina Ionescu (2)	New York Liberty	Teaira McCowan	Dallas Wings	

=== Rookies of the Month ===
Month	Player	Team	Reference
May	Rhyne Howard (4)	Atlanta Dream	
June	Rhyne Howard (4)	Atlanta Dream	
July	Rhyne Howard (4)	Atlanta Dream	
August	Rhyne Howard (4)	Atlanta Dream	

=== Coaches of the Month ===
Month	Coach	Team	Reference
May	Becky Hammon	Las Vegas Aces	
June	James Wade (2)	Chicago Sky	
July	James Wade (2)	Chicago Sky	
August	Vickie Johnson	Dallas Wings	

== Coaches ==
=== Eastern Conference ===
Team	Head coach	Previous job	Years with team	Record with team	Playoff appearances	Finals Appearances	WNBA Championships
Atlanta Dream	Tanisha Wright	Las Vegas Aces (assistant)	0	0–0	0	0	0
Chicago Sky	James Wade	UMMC Ekaterinburg (assistant)	3	48–40	3	1	1
Connecticut Sun	Curt Miller	Los Angeles Sparks (assistant)	6	111–75	5	1	0
Indiana Fever	Marianne Stanley	Washington Mystics (assistant)	2	12–42	0	0	0
New York Liberty	Sandy Brondello	Phoenix Mercury	0	0–0	0	0	0
Washington Mystics	Mike Thibault	Connecticut Sun	9	151–147	7	2	1

=== Western Conference ===
Team	Head coach	Previous job	Years with team	Record with team	Playoff appearances	Finals Appearances	WNBA Championships
Dallas Wings	Vickie Johnson	Las Vegas Aces (assistant)	1	14–18	1	0	0
Las Vegas Aces	Becky Hammon	San Antonio Spurs (assistant)	0	0–0	0	0	0
Los Angeles Sparks	Derek Fisher	New York Knicks	3	49–39	2	0	0
Minnesota Lynx	Cheryl Reeve	Detroit Shock (assistant)	12	267–127	11	6	4
Phoenix Mercury	Vanessa Nygaard	Las Vegas Aces (assistant)	0	0–0	0	0	0
Seattle Storm	Noelle Quinn	Seattle Storm (associate head coach)	1	16–10	1	0	0

Notes:

- Year with team does not include 2022 season.
- Records are from time at current team and are through the end of the 2021 regular season.
- Playoff appearances are from time at current team only.
- WNBA Finals and Championships do not include time with other teams.
- Coaches shown are the coaches who began the 2022 season as head coach of each team.
