= List of 2020 WNBA season transactions =

This is a list of transactions that have taken place during the off-season and the 2020 WNBA season.

== Retirement ==
Date	Name	Team(s) played (years)	Age	Notes	Ref.
June 2019	(United States) Camille Little	San Antonio Silver Stars (2007); Atlanta Dream (2008); Seattle Storm (2008–2014); Connecticut Sun (2015–2016); Phoenix Mercury (2017–2019)	34	WNBA Champion (2010); WNBA All-Rookie Team (2007); Also played overseas in Israel, Cyprus, Turkey, China and Italy.	
September 2019	(Spain) Sancho Lyttle	Houston Comets (2005–2008); Atlanta Dream (2009–2017); Phoenix Mercury (2018–2019)	36	WNBA All-Star (2009); 2× WNBA steals leader (2015, 2016); Also played overseas in Spain, Turkey and Russia.	
January 22, 2020	(United States) Alana Beard	Washington Mystics (2004–2011); Los Angeles Sparks (2012–2019)	37	WNBA Champion (2016); 4× WNBA All-Star (2005–2007, 2009); All-WNBA Second Team (2006); 2× WNBA Defensive Player of the Year (2017, 2018); 5× WNBA All-Defensive First Team (2007, 2012, 2016–2018); 4× WNBA All-Defensive Second Team (2005, 2006, 2009, 2014); Also played overseas in Australia, South Korea, Israel, Poland and Spain.	
February 11, 2020	(United States) Rebekkah Brunson	Sacramento Monarchs (2004–2009); Minnesota Lynx (2010–2018)	38	5× WNBA Champion (2005, 2011, 2013, 2015, 2017); 5× WNBA All-Star (2007, 2011, 2013, 2017, 2018); WNBA All-Defensive First Team (2011); 6× WNBA All-Defensive Second Team (2007, 2008, 2010, 2013, 2017, 2018); WNBA all-time rebounding leader Also played overseas in Belgium, Russia, Italy, Spain and Czech Republic.	
February 24, 2020	(United States) Carolyn Swords	Chicago Sky (2011–2013); New York Liberty (2015–2016); Seattle Storm (2017); Las Vegas Aces (2018–2019)	30	Also played overseas in Turkey, Spain, Italy, Australia and Poland. Subsequently took back retirement in 2020 to continue playing for the Aces.	

== Front office movements ==
=== Head coach changes ===
Off-season

Departure date	Team	Outgoing head coach	Reason for departure	Hire date	Incoming head coach	Last coaching position	Ref.
September 9	Indiana Fever	(United States) Pokey Chatman	Fired	November 26	(United States) Marianne Stanley	Washington Mystics assistant coach (2010–2019)	
October 16	New York Liberty	(United States) Katie Smith	Fired	January 9	(United States) Walt Hopkins	Minnesota Lynx assistant coach (2017–2019)	

== Player movement ==
=== Trades ===
February
February 10	To Atlanta Dream: (United States) Kalani Brown	To Los Angeles Sparks: (Germany) Marie Gülich; (United States) Brittney Sykes
February 10	To Seattle Storm: (United States) Morgan Tuck; 2020 first-round pick (#11)	To Connecticut Sun: 2020 first-round pick (#7)
February 11	To Connecticut Sun: (United States) DeWanna Bonner	To Phoenix Mercury: 2020 first-round pick (#7); 2020 first-round pick (#10); 2021 first-round pick
February 12	To Phoenix Mercury: (United States) Skylar Diggins-Smith	To Dallas Wings: 2020 first-round pick (#5); 2020 first-round pick (#7); 2021 first-round pick
February 12	To Dallas Wings: (Spain) Astou Ndour	To Chicago Sky: 2021 first-round pick
February 14	To Dallas Wings: (United States) Katie Lou Samuelson; 2021 first-round pick	To Chicago Sky: (United States) Azurá Stevens
February 19	Three-team trade	
February 19	To Atlanta Dream: (United States) Courtney Williams (from Connecticut); 2020 second-round pick (#17) (from Phoenix)	To Connecticut Sun: (United States) Briann January (from Phoenix); 2021 second-round pick (from Phoenix)
February 19	To Phoenix Mercury: (United States) Jessica Breland (from Atlanta); (United States) Nia Coffey (from Atlanta)	
February 21	To Dallas Wings: (United States) Marina Mabrey	To Los Angeles Sparks: 2021 second-round pick
February 24	To Connecticut Sun: (United States) Kaleena Mosqueda-Lewis	To Seattle Storm: 2021 second-round pick
February 25	To Minnesota Lynx: (United States) Rachel Banham	To Connecticut Sun: 2021 second-round pick
March
March 6	To Minnesota Lynx: (United States) Shenise Johnson; 2020 second-round pick (#16)	To Indiana Fever: 2020 second-round pick (#14); 2021 third-round pick
April
April 15	Three-team trade	
April 15	To Dallas Wings: 2021 first-round pick (from Washington); 2021 second-round pick (from New York)	To New York Liberty: (United States) Tayler Hill (from Dallas); (United States) Shatori Walker-Kimbrough (from Washington); 2020 first-round pick (#7); 2020 second-round pick (#12); 2020 second-round pick (#15); 2021 first-round pick (from Washington); 2021 second-round pick (from Washington); 2021 third-round pick (from Washington)
April 15	To Washington Mystics: (United States) Tina Charles (from New York)	
April 17	To Minnesota Lynx: (United States) Erica Ogwumike	To New York Liberty: (Australia) Stephanie Talbot
April 17	To New York Liberty: (United States) Jocelyn Willoughby	To Phoenix Mercury: (United States) Shatori Walker-Kimbrough
August
August 28	To Chicago Sky: (United States) Stephanie Mavunga	To Indiana Fever: (United States) Jantel Lavender; 2021 second-round pick; 2021 third-round pick

=== Free agency ===
Player	Date signed	New team	Former team	Ref
(United States) Natisha Hiedeman	February 10	Connecticut Sun		
(Bosnia and Herzegovina) Jonquel Jones	February 10	Connecticut Sun		
(United States) Morgan Bertsch	February 10	Dallas Wings		
(United States) Megan Gustafson	February 10	Dallas Wings		
(United States) Moriah Jefferson	February 10	Dallas Wings		
(United States) Imani McGee-Stafford	February 10	Dallas Wings		
(United Kingdom) Karlie Samuelson	February 10	Dallas Wings		
(United States) Angel McCoughtry	February 10	Las Vegas Aces	Atlanta Dream	
(United States) Kristi Toliver	February 10	Los Angeles Sparks	Washington Mystics	
(United States) Layshia Clarendon	February 10	New York Liberty	Connecticut Sun	
(United States) Isabelle Harrison	February 11	Dallas Wings		
(United States) Tierra Ruffin-Pratt	February 11	Los Angeles Sparks		
(United States) Elena Delle Donne	February 11	Washington Mystics		
(Montenegro) Glory Johnson	February 13	Atlanta Dream	Dallas Wings	
(United States) Sydney Colson	February 13	Chicago Sky	Las Vegas Aces	
(United States) Betnijah Laney	February 13	Indiana Fever		
(United States) Tiffany Mitchell	February 13	Indiana Fever		
(United States) Brittney Griner	February 13	Phoenix Mercury		
(France) Bria Hartley	February 13	Phoenix Mercury	New York Liberty	
(United States) Breanna Stewart	February 13	Seattle Storm		
(Australia) Leilani Mitchell	February 13	Washington Mystics	Phoenix Mercury	
(United States) Kahleah Copper	February 15	Chicago Sky		
(United States) Bria Holmes	February 15	Connecticut Sun		
(United States) Shekinna Stricklen	February 16	Atlanta Dream	Connecticut Sun	
(United States) Danielle Robinson	February 16	Las Vegas Aces	Minnesota Lynx	
(United States) Stefanie Dolson	February 17	Chicago Sky		
(Belgium) Emma Meesseman	February 17	Washington Mystics		
(United States) Alexis Jones	February 18	Atlanta Dream (claimed off waivers)	Los Angeles Sparks (waived on February 15)	
(United States) Sugar Rodgers	February 18	Las Vegas Aces		
(United States) Allie Quigley	February 19	Chicago Sky		
(Hungary) Bernadett Határ	February 19	Indiana Fever	Sopron (Hungary)	
(Russia) Raisa Musina	February 20	Las Vegas Aces	UMMC Ekaterinburg (Russia)	
(United States) Seimone Augustus	February 20	Los Angeles Sparks	Minnesota Lynx	
(United States) Blake Dietrick	February 24	Atlanta Dream	Seattle Storm	
(France) Marine Johannès	February 24	New York Liberty		
(Czech Republic) Kia Vaughn	February 24	Phoenix Mercury	New York Liberty	
(United States) Epiphanny Prince	February 24	Seattle Storm	Las Vegas Aces	
(United States) Courtney Vandersloot	February 25	Chicago Sky		
(Puerto Rico) Jazmon Gwathmey	February 25	Connecticut Sun	San Martino di Lupari (Italy)	
(United States) Sue Bird	February 25	Seattle Storm		
(Latvia) Elīna Dikaioulaku	February 26	Atlanta Dream	Adana (Turkey)	
(France) Valériane Vukosavljević	February 26	Connecticut Sun	USK Praha (Czech Republic)	
(United States) Chelsea Gray	February 28	Los Angeles Sparks		
(South Korea) Kang Lee-seul	February 28	Washington Mystics	Bucheon KEB Hana Bank (Korea)	
(Italy) Cecilia Zandalasini	February 29	Minnesota Lynx		
(Belgium) Julie Allemand	March 2	Indiana Fever	Lyon ASVEL (France)	
(United States) Lindsay Allen	March 2	Las Vegas Aces		
(Greece) Jacki Gemelos	March 13	Connecticut Sun	Olympiacos (Greece)	
(United States) Megan Huff	March 14	Connecticut Sun	New York Liberty	
(United States) Jessica January	March 19	Indiana Fever	Piešťanské Čajky (Slovakia)	
(United States) Avery Warley-Talbert	March 20	Las Vegas Aces	New York Liberty	
(Australia) Sara Blicavs	April 9	Phoenix Mercury	Southside Flyers (Australia)	
(France) Olivia Époupa	April 9	Phoenix Mercury	Canberra Capitals (Australia)	
(United States) Alaina Coates	April 17	Atlanta Dream		
(United States) Dominique McBryde	April 17	Los Angeles Sparks	Arizona	
(Australia) Liz Cambage	April 22	Las Vegas Aces		

=== Waived ===
Player	Date Waived	Former Team	Ref
(United States) Alexis Jones	February 15	Los Angeles Sparks	
(United States) Rebecca Greenwell	February 28	Washington Mystics	
(United States) Brittany Boyd	April 21	New York Liberty	
(United States) Paris Kea	April 22	Indiana Fever	
(United States) Erica McCall	April 22	Indiana Fever	
(United States) Kaela Davis	April 23	Dallas Wings	

== Draft ==
=== First round ===
Pick	Player	Date signed	Team	Ref
1	(United States) Sabrina Ionescu	April 26	New York Liberty	
2	(Germany) Satou Sabally	April 21	Dallas Wings	
3	(United States) Lauren Cox	April 21	Indiana Fever	
4	(United States) Chennedy Carter	April 23	Atlanta Dream	
5	(United States) Bella Alarie	April 20	Dallas Wings	
6	(United Kingdom) Mikiah Herbert Harrigan	April 29	Minnesota Lynx	
7	(United States) Tyasha Harris	April 24	Dallas Wings	
8	(United States) Ruthy Hebard	April 28	Chicago Sky	
9	(United States) Megan Walker	April 22	New York Liberty	
10	(United States) Jocelyn Willoughby	April 25	Phoenix Mercury	
11	(Latvia) Kitija Laksa	April 25	Seattle Storm	
12	(United States) Jazmine Jones	April 22	New York Liberty	

=== Second round ===
Pick	Player	Date signed	Team	Ref
13	(United States) Kylie Shook	April 24	New York Liberty	
14	(United States) Kathleen Doyle	April 21	Indiana Fever	
15	(United States) Leaonna Odom	April 23	New York Liberty	
16	(United States) Crystal Dangerfield	April 22	Minnesota Lynx	
17	(United States) Brittany Brewer	April 20	Atlanta Dream	
18	(United States) Te'a Cooper	April 29	Phoenix Mercury	
19	(United States) Joyner Holmes	April 22	Seattle Storm	
20	(United States) Beatrice Mompremier	April 26	Los Angeles Sparks	
21	(Germany) Luisa Geiselsöder		Dallas Wings	
22	(Germany) Leonie Fiebich		Los Angeles Sparks	
23	(United States) Kaila Charles	April 23	Connecticut Sun	
24	(United States) Jaylyn Agnew	April 22	Washington Mystics	

=== Third round ===
Pick	Player	Date signed	Team	Ref
25	(United States) Mikayla Pivec	April 20	Atlanta Dream	
26	(United States) Erica Ogwumike	April 29	New York Liberty	
27	(United States) Kobi Thornton		Atlanta Dream	
28	(United States) Kamiah Smalls	April 21	Indiana Fever	
29	(United States) Stella Johnson	April 28	Phoenix Mercury	
30	(United States) Japreece Dean	April 24	Chicago Sky	
31	(United States) Haley Gorecki	April 22	Seattle Storm	
32	(United States) Kiah Gillespie	April 25	Chicago Sky	
33	(United States) Lauren Manis	April 27	Las Vegas Aces	
34	(United States) Tynice Martin		Los Angeles Sparks	
35	(United States) Juicy Landrum	April 24	Connecticut Sun	
36	(United States) Sug Sutton	April 22	Washington Mystics	
