= 2020 NCAA Women's Basketball All-Americans =

An All-American team is an honorary sports team composed of the best amateur players of a specific season for each team position—who in turn are given the honorific "All-America" and typically referred to as "All-American athletes", or simply "All-Americans". Although the honorees generally do not compete together as a unit, the term is used in U.S. team sports to refer to players who are selected by members of the national media. Walter Camp selected the first All-America team in the early days of American football in 1889. The 2020 NCAA Women's Basketball All-Americans are honorary lists that include All-American selections from the Associated Press (AP), the United States Basketball Writers Association (USBWA), and the Women's Basketball Coaches Association (WBCA) for the 2019–20 NCAA Division I women's basketball season. Both AP and USBWA choose three teams, while WBCA lists 10 honorees.

A consensus All-America team in women's basketball has never been organized. This differs from the practice in men's basketball, in which the NCAA uses a combination of selections by AP, USBWA, the National Association of Basketball Coaches (NABC), and Sporting News to determine a consensus All-America team. The selection of a consensus All-America men's basketball team is possible because all four organizations select at least a first and second team, with only the USBWA not selecting a third team.

Before the 2017–18 season, it was impossible for a consensus women's All-America team to be determined because the AP had been the only body that divided its women's selections into separate teams. The USBWA first named separate teams in 2017–18. The women's counterpart to the NABC, the Women's Basketball Coaches Association (WBCA), continues the USBWA's former practice of selecting a single 10-member (plus ties) team. Before the 2023–24 season, Sporting News did not select an All-America team in women's basketball.

== By selector ==
=== Associated Press (AP) ===
First team		Second team		Third team	
Player	School	Player	School	Player	School
Lauren Cox	Baylor	Aliyah Boston	South Carolina	Kaila Charles	Maryland
Ruthy Hebard	Oregon	Chennedy Carter	Texas A&M	Elissa Cunane	NC State
Rhyne Howard	Kentucky	Dana Evans	Louisville	Kathleen Doyle	Iowa
Sabrina Ionescu	Oregon	Aari McDonald	Arizona	Tyasha Harris	South Carolina
Megan Walker	UConn	Satou Sabally	Oregon	Michaela Onyenwere	UCLA

==== AP Honorable Mention ====
- Jaylyn Agnew, Creighton
- Bella Alarie, Princeton
- Brittany Brewer, Texas Tech
- Te'a Cooper, Baylor
- Crystal Dangerfield, UConn
- Rennia Davis, Tennessee
- Ciara Duffy, South Dakota
- Kiah Gillespie, Florida State

- Haley Gorecki, Duke
- Vivian Gray, Oklahoma State
- Arella Guirantes, Rutgers
- Ashley Joens, Iowa State
- Stella Johnson, Rider
- Ila Lane, UC Santa Barbara
- Beatrice Mompremier, Miami

- Olivia Nelson-Ododa, UConn
- Mikayla Pivec, Oregon State
- Lindsey Pulliam, Northwestern
- NaLyssa Smith, Baylor
- Chante Stonewall, DePaul
- Unique Thompson, Auburn
- Kiana Williams, Stanford

=== United States Basketball Writers Association (USBWA) ===
First team		Second team		Third team	
Player	School	Player	School	Player	School
Lauren Cox	Baylor	Aliyah Boston	South Carolina	Kaila Charles	Maryland
Ruthy Hebard	Oregon	Chennedy Carter	Texas A&M	Elissa Cunane	NC State
Rhyne Howard	Kentucky	Dana Evans	Louisville	Kathleen Doyle	Iowa
Sabrina Ionescu	Oregon	Aari McDonald	Arizona	Haley Gorecki	Duke
Megan Walker	UConn	Satou Sabally	Oregon	Tyasha Harris	South Carolina
				Michaela Onyenwere	UCLA

=== Women's Basketball Coaches Association (WBCA) ===
Player	School
Chennedy Carter	Texas A&M
Lauren Cox	Baylor
Kathleen Doyle	Iowa
Dana Evans	Louisville
Tyasha Harris	South Carolina
Ruthy Hebard	Oregon
Sabrina Ionescu	Oregon
Aari McDonald	Arizona
Satou Sabally	Oregon
Megan Walker	UConn

== By player ==
Player	School	Year	AP	USBWA	WBCA	Notes
Lauren Cox	Baylor	Sr	1	1	1	12.5 ppg, 8.4 rpg, 2.7 blocks
Ruthy Hebard	Oregon	Sr	1	1	1	17.3 ppg, 9.6 rpg, 68.5 FG% Katrina McClain Award (top power forward)
Rhyne Howard	Kentucky	So	1	1	–	23.4 ppg, 6.5 rpg, 38.2 3P%
Sabrina Ionescu	Oregon	Sr	1	1	1	17.5 ppg, 8.6 rpg, 9.1 apg Wooden Award; Naismith Trophy; Wade Trophy; AP Player of the Year; USBWA Player of the Year; Senior CLASS Award; Nancy Lieberman Award (top point guard)
Megan Walker	UConn	Jr	1	1	1	19.7 ppg, 8.4 rpg, 47.7 FG%
Aliyah Boston	South Carolina	Fr	2	2	–	12.5 ppg, 9.4 rpg, 60.9 FG% Tamika Catchings Award (USBWA freshman of the year); WBCA Freshman of the Year; Lisa Leslie Award (top center)
Chennedy Carter	Texas A&M	Jr	2	2	1	21.3 ppg, 4.3 rpg, 3.5 apg
Dana Evans	Louisville	Jr	2	2	1	18.1 ppg, 4.2 apg, 89.0 FT%
Aari McDonald	Arizona	Jr	2	2	1	20.5 ppg, 5.8 rpg, 79.1 FT% Ann Meyers Drysdale Award (top shooting guard)
Satou Sabally	Oregon	Jr	2	2	1	16.2 ppg, 6.9 rpg, 79.2 FT% Cheryl Miller Award (top small forward)
Kaila Charles	Maryland	Sr	3	3	–	14.3 ppg, 7.3 rpg, 50.0 FG%
Elissa Cunane	NC State	So	3	3	–	16.4 ppg, 9.6 rpg, 54.7 FG%
Kathleen Doyle	Iowa	Sr	3	3	1	18.1 ppg, 4.6 rpg, 6.3 apg
Haley Gorecki	Duke	Sr	–	3	–	18.5 ppg, 6.6 rpg, 4.4 apg
Tyasha Harris	South Carolina	Sr	3	3	1	12.1 ppg, 5.7 apg, 86.7 FT% Dawn Staley Award
Michaela Onyenwere	UCLA	Jr	3	3	–	19.1 ppg, 8.6 rpg, 46.9 FG%

== Academic All-Americans ==
The College Sports Information Directors of America (CoSIDA) announced its 15-member 2020 Academic All-America team on March 9, 2020, divided into first, second and third teams with Brittany Brewer of Texas Tech chosen as women's college basketball Academic All-American of the Year.

When a player is listed with two grade-point averages, the first is her undergraduate GPA. Players listed with two majors separated by a slash are double majors unless explicitly designated as undergraduate and graduate programs.

First Team
Player	School	Class	GPA and major
Brittany Brewer (Note: First-team selection in 2018–19.)	Texas Tech	GS	4.00/3.66, Community, Family & Addiction Sciences
Ciara Duffy (Note: First-team selection in 2018–19 and third-team in 2017–18.)	South Dakota	GS	4.00/4.00, Political Science / History
Erica Ogwumike	Rice	GS	3.86/4.00, Post-Baccalaureate Program
Mikayla Pivec (Note: Second-team selection in 2018–19.)	Oregon State	GS	3.89/4.00, Biochemistry / Biophysics
Sara Rhine	Drake	GS	4.00/4.00, Elementary Education (UG) / Counseling (G)

Second Team
Player	School	Class	GPA and major
Lauren Cox	Baylor	Sr.	3.77, Communications Studies
Kathleen Doyle	Iowa	Sr.	3.83, Journalism & Mass Communications / Spanish
Ellie Harmeyer	Belmont	GS	3.83/4.00, Nursing
Becca Hittner (Note: Third-team selection in 2018–19.)	Drake	Sr.	3.97, Marketing
Peyton Williams	Kansas State	Sr.	3.94, Anthropology / International Studies

Third Team
Player	School	Class	GPA and major
Camryn Brown	High Point	Sr.	3.97, Human Relations
Hanna Crymble	Vermont	Sr.	3.81, Biochemistry
Vivian Gray	Oklahoma State	Jr.	3.66, Marketing
Chante Stonewall	DePaul	Sr.	3.68, Psychology / Sociology
Jocelyn Willoughby	Virginia	GS	3.87/3.63, Leadership & Public Policy / Global Development Studies

== Senior All-Americans ==
The finalists for the Senior CLASS Award, called Senior All-Americans, were announced on February 5, 2020. Due to a tie in voting, 11 finalists were named instead of the normal 10. On March 31, Sabrina Ionescu was announced as the recipient, with the first and second teams also announced at that time.

=== First team ===
Player	Position	School
Sabrina Ionescu	Guard	Oregon
Lauren Cox	Forward	Baylor
Ellie Harmeyer	Forward	Belmont
Mikayla Pivec	Guard	Oregon State
Brenna Wise	Forward	Indiana

=== Second team ===
Player	Position	School
Chelsea Brackmann	Forward	Bradley
Kaila Charles	Forward	Maryland
Bailey Greenberg	Forward	Drexel
Ruthy Hebard	Forward	Oregon
Stella Johnson	Guard	Rider
Peyton Williams	Forward	Kansas State
