= Ogwumike =

Ogwumike is a surname. Notable people with the surname include:

- Chiney Ogwumike (born 1992), Nigerian-American basketball player
- Erica Ogwumike (born 1997), Nigerian-American basketball player, sister of Nneka and Chiney
- Nneka Ogwumike (born 1990), Nigerian-American basketball player
