= Mark Alarie =

American basketball player (born 1963)

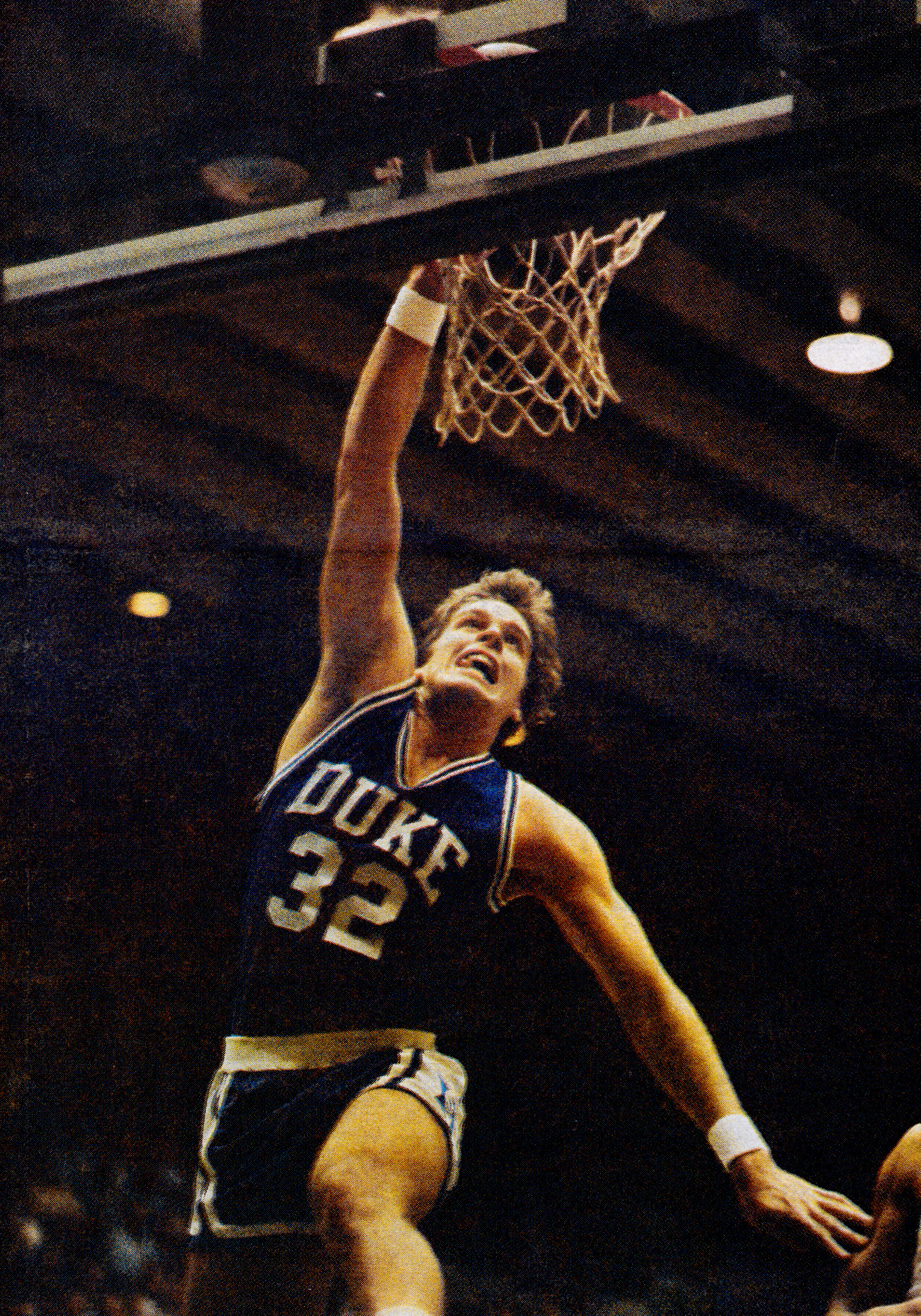
- Alarie with the Duke Blue Devils in 1985

Personal information
- Born: December 11, 1963 (age 62) Phoenix, Arizona, U.S.
- Listed height: 6 ft 8 in (2.03 m)
- Listed weight: 217 lb (98 kg)

Career information
- High school: Brophy Prep (Phoenix, Arizona)
- College: Duke (1982–1986)
- NBA draft: 1986: 1st round, 18th overall pick
- Drafted by: Denver Nuggets
- Playing career: 1986–1992
- Position: Power forward
- Number: 32, 31
- Coaching career: 1999–2000

Career history

Playing
- 1986–1987: Denver Nuggets
- 1987–1991: Washington Bullets

Coaching
- 1999–2000: Navy (assistant)

Career highlights
- Third-team All-American – UPI (1986); 2× First-team All-ACC (1984, 1986); Second-team All-ACC (1985); Fourth-team Parade All-American (1982)

Career NBA statistics
- Points: 2,432 (7.5 ppg)
- Rebounds: 1,120 (3.4 rpg)
- Stats at NBA.com
- Stats at Basketball Reference

Mark Steven Alarie (born December 11, 1963) is an American former professional basketball player who played in the National Basketball Association (NBA). He played college basketball for the Duke Blue Devils and was selected by the Denver Nuggets as the 18th overall pick in the 1986 NBA draft. Alarie spent his rookie season with the Nuggets and was then traded to the Washington Bullets in 1987. He played four seasons for the Bullets until his retirement in 1992 after missing the entire 1991–92 season due to knee surgery.

== Early life ==
Alarie attended Brophy College Preparatory in Phoenix, Arizona. He developed as a jump shooter who only utilized his 6 ft 8 in (2.03 m) height when required by his coach.

Alarie was inducted into the azcentral High School Sports Hall of Fame in 2008.

Alarie had a goal of attending Stanford University until he was recruited by Mike Krzyzewski of Duke University who convinced him that playing in the Atlantic Coast Conference (ACC) would improve his skills.

== College career ==
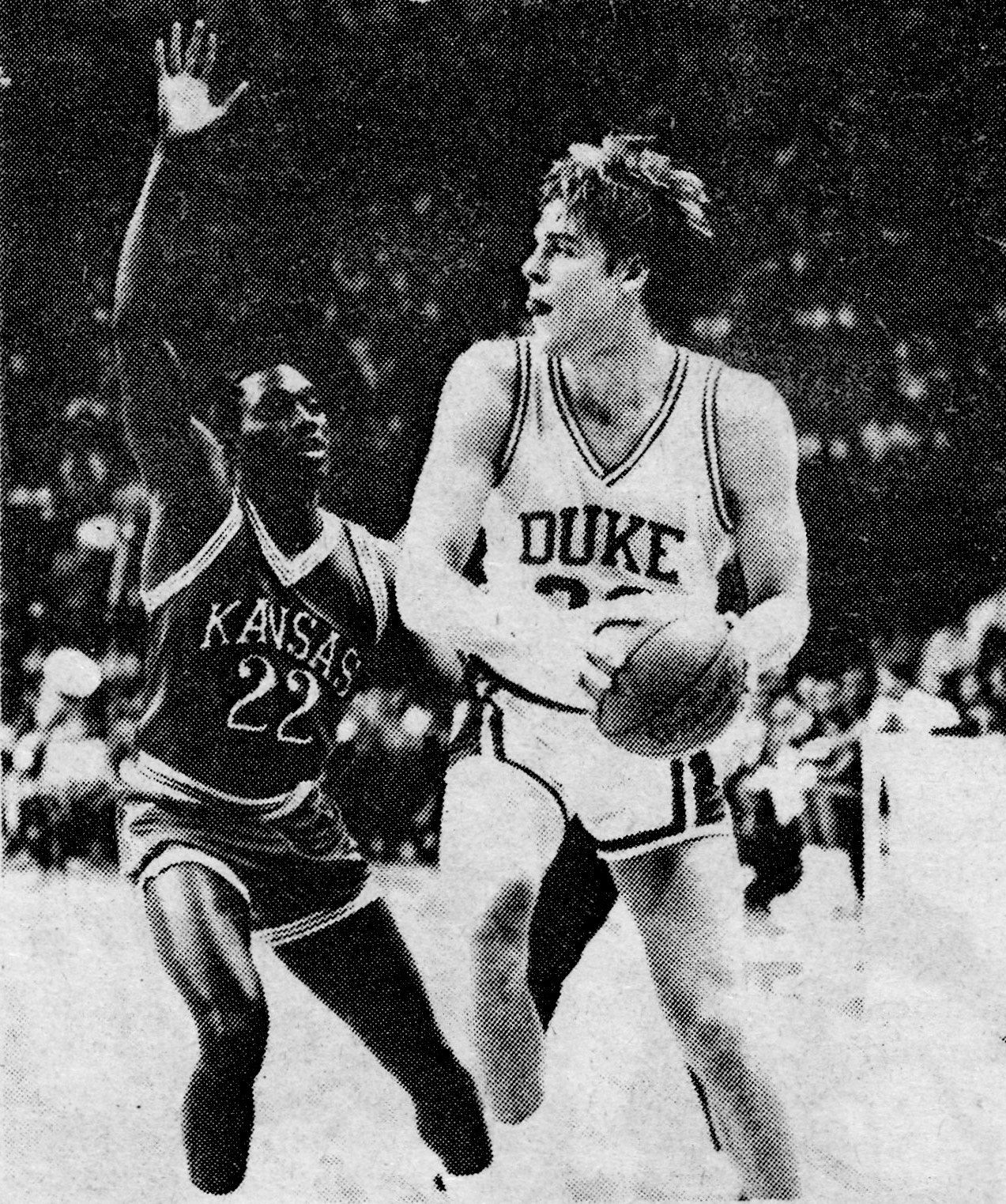
Alarie guarded by Cedric Hunter of the Kansas Jayhawks during the 1986 Final Four

Alarie played college basketball for the Duke Blue Devils where he joined a recruiting class that included Johnny Dawkins, David Henderson and Jay Bilas. He was a major component in the revitalization of the Blue Devils team while they rebuilt under Krzyzewski. Alarie was named to the All-ACC first team as a sophomore and senior, and the second team as a junior. He scored 2,136 career points and ranks as 5th on the Blue Devils' all-time scoring list. Alarie ranks 6th in career minutes played (4,042), 8th in career free throw percentage (79.7%) and 10th in career field goal percentage (55.0%).

Alarie was inducted into the Duke Athletics Hall of Fame in 1999.

== Professional career ==
Alarie was selected by the Denver Nuggets as the 18th overall pick of the 1986 NBA draft. He spent his rookie season with the Nuggets.

On November 2, 1987, Alarie was traded to the Washington Bullets alongside Darrell Walker in exchange for Jay Vincent and Michael Adams.

On June 3, 1989, Alarie re-signed with the Bullets on a multi-year contract. He emerged as a role player for the Bullets during the 1989–90 season and averaged career highs in points (10.5), rebounds (4.6) and minutes (23.1) per game. Alarie was one of head coach Wes Unseld's most valuable reserves and used at all three front-court positions.

Alarie fell out of the team's rotation during the start of the 1990–91 season. He began to suffer from knee soreness and he withdrew from playing in February 1991 to avoid injuring himself further. Alarie underwent knee surgery in September 1991 and missed the entire 1991–92 season. The Bullets announced Alarie's retirement on September 17, 1992.

== Post-playing career ==
Alarie worked as the vice president for a business in Baltimore, Maryland. He had aspirations of becoming an NCAA Division I basketball head coach and joined the Navy Midshipmen men's basketball team in 1999. He spent one season with the team until he decided that he "didn't feel like [he] was cut out to be a head coach" and resigned to reenter the business world.

Alarie has served as a coach for Amateur Athletic Union (AAU) teams.

== Personal life ==
Alarie is married to Rene Augustine who works as an attorney in the United States Department of Justice. Their daughter Bella played for the Princeton Tigers basketball team and was selected by the Dallas Wings as the fifth overall in the 2020 WNBA draft.

== Career statistics ==
Legend
GP	Games played	GS	Games started	MPG	Minutes per game
FG%	Field goal percentage	3P%	3-point field goal percentage	FT%	Free throw percentage
RPG	Rebounds per game	APG	Assists per game	SPG	Steals per game
BPG	Blocks per game	PPG	Points per game	**Bold**	Career high
*	Led the league

=== NBA ===
==== Regular season ====
Year	Team	GP	GS	MPG	FG%	3P%	FT%	RPG	APG	SPG	BPG	PPG
1986–87	Denver	64	**25**	17.3	**.490**	.222	.663	3.3	1.2	.3	.4	7.9
1987–88	Washington	63	0	12.2	.480	.222	.714	2.5	.6	.2	.2	5.2
1988–89	Washington	74	5	15.4	.478	**.342**	.839	3.4	.9	.3	.3	6.7
1989–90	Washington	**82***	10	**23.1**	.473	.204	.812	**4.6**	**1.7**	**.7**	**.5**	**10.5**
1990–91	Washington	42	1	14.0	.440	.238	**.854**	2.8	1.1	.4	.2	5.8
Career		325	41	16.9	.475	.252	.775	3.4	1.1	.4	.3	7.5

==== Playoffs ====
Year	Team	GP	GS	MPG	FG%	3P%	FT%	RPG	APG	SPG	BPG	PPG
1987	Denver	**3**	0	**13.7**	**.600**	–	**1.000**	**1.7**	**.3**	**.7**	**.7**	**6.7**
1988	Washington	1	0	4.0	.500	**.500**	–	1.0	.0	.0	.0	3.0
Career		4	0	11.3	.588	.500	1.000	1.5	.3	.5	.5	5.8
