= Bella Alarie =

American basketball player (born 1998)

Personal information
- Born: April 23, 1998 (age 28) Washington, D.C., U.S.
- Listed height: 6 ft 5 in (1.96 m)

Career information
- High school: National Cathedral School (Washington, D.C.)
- College: Princeton (2016–2020)
- WNBA draft: 2020: 1st round, 5th overall pick
- Drafted by: Dallas Wings
- Playing career: 2020–2023
- Position: Center / power forward

Career history
- 2020–2022: Dallas Wings
- 2020: Galatasaray
- 2020–2022: Avenida

Career highlights
- AP All-America Honorable Mention (2020); Ivy League Tournament MVP (2018, 2019); 3× Ivy League Player of the Year (2018–2020); 4× First-team All-Ivy (2017–2020); Ivy League Rookie of the Year (2017)
- Stats at Basketball Reference
Medals
Women's basketball
Representing United States
Pan American Games
Silver medal – second place	2019 Lima	Team
FIBA Under-19 World Cup
Silver medal – second place	2017 Italy	Team

Isabella Augustine Alarie (born April 23, 1998) is an American former professional basketball player. She played her entire career for the Dallas Wings of the Women's National Basketball Association (WNBA). She is the daughter of Mark Alarie, a retired professional basketball player who played in the NBA for the 1986–1991 seasons.

== College career ==
Alarie played college basketball for the Princeton Tigers. She was the three-time Ivy League Player of the Year (from 2018 to 2020) and was selected to All-America Honorable Mention by the Associated Press (AP). Alarie started in all 106 games during her career in Princeton from the 2016–17 to 2019–20 seasons. In her junior year (2018–19 season), she averaged a career best double-double of 22.8 ppg and 10.6 rpg. Alarie is a career 34.8% 3-point shooter who also averaged 1.2 steals and 2.3 blocks per game. Following the 2019–20 season, Alarie was named an Honorable Mention All-American by the Associated Press. She graduated from Princeton with a bachelor's degree in history.

== WNBA career ==
Alarie was selected as the 5th overall pick by the Dallas Wings in the 2020 WNBA draft, which was held remotely due to the COVID-19 pandemic, tying her with Allison Feaster of Harvard for the Ivy League's highest-ever draft pick.

During the 2021 season, she played 31 games for the Dallas Wings, averaging 2.6 points and 3.3 rebounds per game.

Alarie sat out the entire 2022 season due to "personal reasons". She officially announced her retirement from professional basketball on February 2, 2023, citing desires to want to explore the business side of basketball as opposed to playing. Her final WNBA game was the First Round Playoff Game between Dallas and the Chicago Sky on September 23, 2021, where Dallas would be eliminated after losing to Chicago 64–81. Alarie played for 4 minutes and recorded 3 rebounds and 1 assist in her final game.

== Post-retirement ==
In June 2024, Alarie joined the Georgetown Hoyas as the director of player development and experience. In 2025, she would leave coaching to join women's sports newsletter, The IX, as its vice president of Sales and Marketing.

== Career statistics ==
Legend
GP	Games played	GS	Games started	MPG	Minutes per game	RPG	Rebounds per game
APG	Assists per game	SPG	Steals per game	BPG	Blocks per game	PPG	Points per game
TO	Turnovers per game	FG%	Field-goal percentage	3P%	3-point field-goal percentage	FT%	Free-throw percentage
**Bold**	Career best	°	League leader

=== College ===
Year	Team	GP	GS	MPG	FG%	3P%	FT%	RPG	APG	SPG	BPG	TO	PPG
2016–17	Princeton	**30**	**30**	30.6	.432	**.379**	.667	8.0	2.1	1.1	1.7	**1.7**	12.6
2017–18	Princeton	**30**	**30**	30.7	.489	.328	.789	9.4	2.3	**1.3**	2.6	**1.7**	13.3
2018–19	Princeton	23	23	**32.1**	**.515**	.295	**.829**	**10.6**	**3.4**	1.2	**2.8**	1.9	**22.8**
2019–20*	Princeton	23	23	29.8	.474	.356	.744	8.6	2.3	1.2	2.3	**1.7**	17.5
Career		106	106	30.8	.480	.348	.761	9.1	2.5	1.2	2.3	1.7	16.1

* 2020 NCAA tournament cancelled due to COVID-19 pandemic
Source: goprincetontigers.com

=== WNBA ===
==== Regular season ====
Year	Team	GP	GS	MPG	FG%	3P%	FT%	RPG	APG	SPG	BPG	TO	PPG
2020	Dallas	22°	3	**14.0**	.364	**.077**	.833	2.9	**0.5**	**0.6**	**0.8**	**0.5**	**2.7**
2021	Dallas	**31**	**11**	13.1	**.500**	.000	**.850**	**3.3**	**0.5**	**0.6**	0.6	0.6	2.6
Career	2 years, 1 team	53	14	13.5	.431	.067	.844	3.1	0.5	0.6	0.7	0.5	2.6

==== Playoffs ====
Year	Team	GP	GS	MPG	FG%	3P%	FT%	RPG	APG	SPG	BPG	TO	PPG
2021	Dallas	1	1	4.0	.000	.000	.000	3.0	1.0	0.0	0.0	1.0	0.0

== Personal life ==
Bella Alarie is the daughter of Mark Alarie and Rene Augustine. She has two brothers, Christian and Alexander. Mark Alarie was a two-time All-ACC first-team selection at Duke and was drafted in the first round of 1986 NBA draft. Rene Augustine was appointed the Acting Deputy Assistant Attorney General of the Antitrust Division at the Department of Justice in 2019 and the Deputy Assistant Attorney General of the Antitrust Division at the Department of Justice in 2020. Bella's grandfather, Norman Augustine, graduated magna cum laude from Princeton and was a professor at Princeton's School of Engineering and Applied Science from 1997 to 1999, and is the former CEO of Lockheed-Martin Corp.
