= Brittany Brewer =

American basketball player (born 1997)

- Brewer in 2023

Personal information
- Born: November 6, 1997 (age 28) Abilene, Texas, U.S.
- Listed height: 6 ft 5 in (1.96 m)
- Listed weight: 182 lb (83 kg)

Career information
- High school: Wylie (Abilene, Texas)
- College: Texas Tech (2016–2020)
- WNBA draft: 2020: 2nd round, 17th overall pick
- Drafted by: Atlanta Dream
- Playing career: 2020–present
- Position: Power forward

Career history
- 2020: Atlanta Dream
- 2020–2021: Maccabi Haifa
- 2021–2022: Ladies Liege Panthers
- 2022–2023: A.O. Eleutheria Moschatou
- 2023–present: Araski AES
- 2024: Halcones de Xalapa

Career highlights
- Women's Basketball Academic All-American of the Year (2020); Big 12 All-Defensive Team (2020); First-team All-Big 12 (2020); Big 12 All-Freshman Team (2017)
- Stats at Basketball Reference
Medals
Women's basketball
Representing United States
Pan American Games
Silver medal – second place	2019 Lima	Team

Brittany Brewer (born November 6, 1997) is an American professional basketball player. She played in college for the Texas Tech Lady Raiders of the Big 12 Conference. Brewer is the 2020 CoSIDA Academic All-American of the Year. She was also selected as a First-team Academic All-American in 2019.

== College career ==
Brewer started 17 games in each of her freshman and sophomore seasons with the Lady Raiders. In the 2018–19 season, she started all 31 games as a junior and added 3-point shootings to her repertoire; averaging 34.3% on 99 attempts while attempting none in her prior two years. In the 2019–20 season, Brewer once again started all 29 games as a senior and averaged a double-double of 16.6 ppg and 10.3 rpg.

During her senior year, she also tied the NCAA Division I women's single-game record for blocked shots, recording 16 as part of a triple-double in the Lady Raiders' 83–38 rout of Louisiana–Monroe on December 22, 2019.

== Professional career ==
Brewer was selected with the fifth pick in the second round, 17th overall, of the 2020 WNBA draft by the Atlanta Dream.

== Career statistics ==
Legend
GP	Games played	GS	Games started	MPG	Minutes per game	RPG	Rebounds per game
APG	Assists per game	SPG	Steals per game	BPG	Blocks per game	PPG	Points per game
TO	Turnovers per game	FG%	Field-goal percentage	3P%	3-point field-goal percentage	FT%	Free-throw percentage
**Bold**	Career best	°	League leader

=== College ===
Year	Team	GP	GS	MPG	FG%	3P%	FT%	RPG	APG	SPG	BPG	TO	PPG
2016–17	Texas Tech	**31**	17	22.3	.452	.000	.604	5.7	0.5	0.2	1.7	**1.5**	5.8
2017–18	Texas Tech	30	17	20.2	.490	.000	.531	5.0	0.8	0.4	1.3	2.4	9.5
2018–19	Texas Tech	**31**	**31**	31.0	**.528**	**.343**	**.692**	9.1	**1.2**	**0.7**	2.3	2.5	**16.6**
2019–20*	Texas Tech	29	29	**31.5**	.509	.243	.675	**10.3**	0.9	**0.7**	**4.4**	2.5	**16.6**
Career		121	94	26.2	.495	.146	.625	7.5	0.7	0.5	2.4	2.3	12.1

* 2020 NCAA tournament cancelled due to coronavirus disease pandemic
Source: texastech.com

=== WNBA ===
==== Regular season ====
Year	Team	GP	GS	MPG	FG%	3P%	FT%	RPG	APG	SPG	BPG	TO	PPG
2020	Atlanta	5	0	6.6	.667	–	–	1.0	0.0	0.6	0.8	0.4	0.8

Source: basketball-reference.com

== Personal life ==
Brittany Brewer is the daughter of Jacob and Melanie Brewer. She has four siblings: Brianna, Brooklyn, Joy and Josh. Brewer majored in Community, Family and Addiction Sciences at Texas Tech.
