= Crystal Dangerfield =

American basketball player (born 1998)

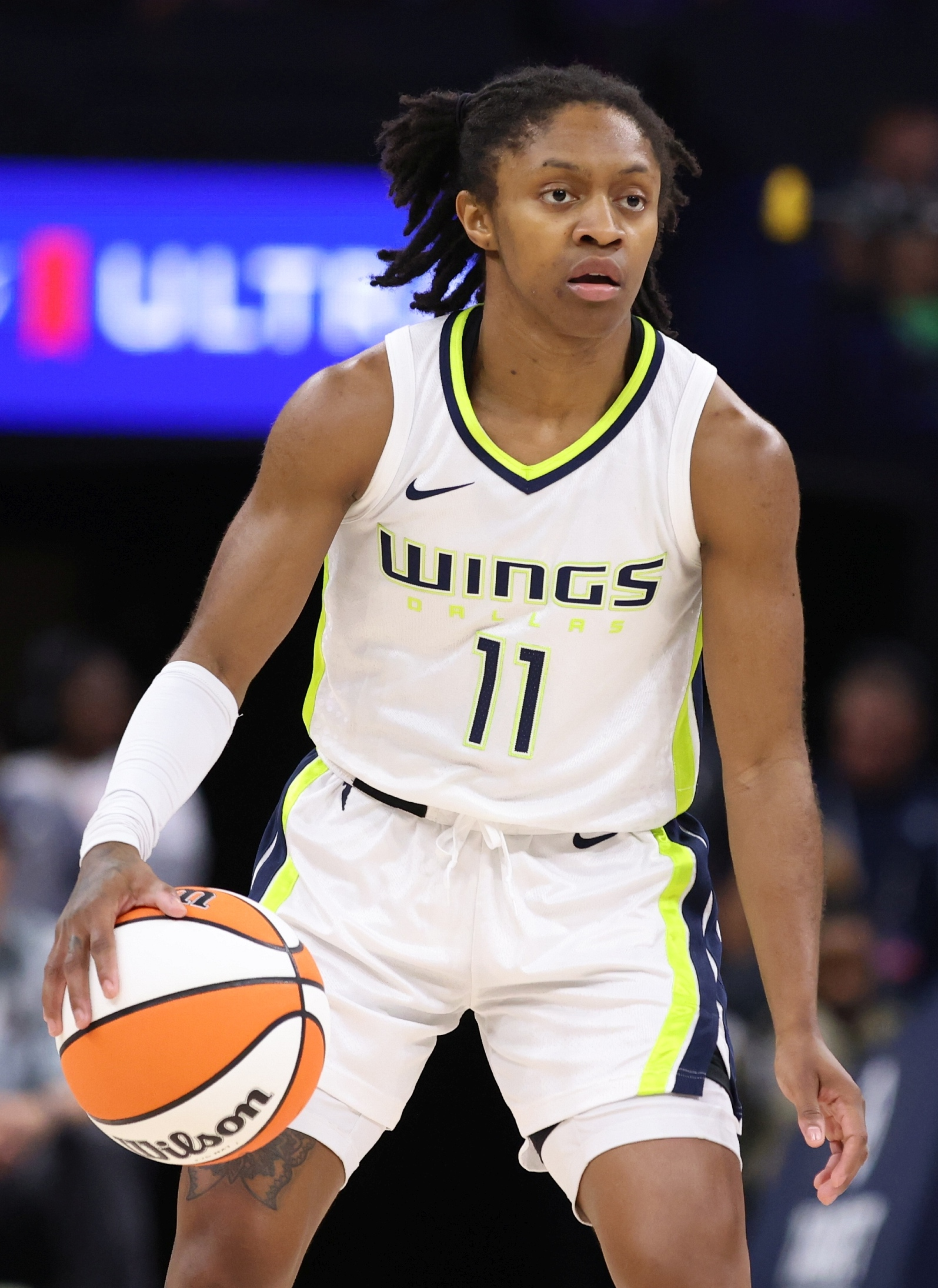
- Dangerfield with the Dallas Wings in 2023

Emlak Konut
- Position: Point guard
- League: Women's Basketball Super League

Personal information
- Born: May 11, 1998 (age 28) Murfreesboro, Tennessee, U.S.
- Listed height: 5 ft 5 in (1.65 m)
- Listed weight: 130 lb (59 kg)

Career information
- High school: Blackman (Murfreesboro, Tennessee)
- College: UConn (2016–2020)
- WNBA draft: 2020: 2nd round, 16th overall pick
- Drafted by: Minnesota Lynx
- Playing career: 2020–present

Career history
- 2020–2021: Minnesota Lynx
- 2021–2022: Elitzur Ramla
- 2022: Indiana Fever
- 2022: New York Liberty
- 2023: Dallas Wings
- 2024: Atlanta Dream
- 2024: Los Angeles Sparks
- 2024–2026: Kayseri Basketbol
- 2026–present: Emlak Konut

Career highlights
- WNBA Rookie of the Year (2020); WNBA All-Rookie Team (2020); 2x First-Team All-AAC (2019, 2020); AAC All-Freshman Team (2017); Morgan Wootten National Player of the Year (2016); McDonald's All-American (2016); 2× Class AAA Tennessee Miss Basketball (2015, 2016); 1× Israeli champion (2022)
- Stats at Basketball Reference
Medals
Women's basketball
Representing the United States
FIBA Under-19 World Cup
Silver medal – second place	2017 Italy	Team
Gold medal – first place	2015 Russia	Team
FIBA Americas Under-16 Championship
Gold medal – first place	2013 Mexico	Team

Crystal Simone Dangerfield (born May 11, 1998) is an American professional basketball player who currently plays for Emlak Konut. After a high school career that made her the nation's top-ranked point guard, she played college basketball for the UConn Huskies. Dangerfield was drafted in the second round of the 2020 WNBA draft by Minnesota, where she was named WNBA Rookie of the Year after leading the team in scoring. At 5'5", for the 2024 season, she is the shortest player in the WNBA (together with Olivia Époupa).

== Early life ==
Dangerfield is the youngest daughter of Christopher and Davonna Dangerfield of Murfreesboro, Tennessee. She has an older brother, Komar, and one sister, Brooke. Both parents served in the U.S. Army. She started playing basketball at the age of 5.

Dangerfield attended Blackman High School where she belonged to the collegiate academy and was an honor roll student for four years. She was Blackman's starting point guard for four years when the school won state titles in 2015 and 2016.

Dangerfield played USA Basketball, winning a gold medal in 2013 and 2015. She was named Miss Basketball Tennessee in her junior and senior years, was three times the Tennessee Gatorade Player of the Year, and was The Tennessean girls basketball player of the year in three consecutive years. Dangerfield was a finalist for the Naismith Prep Player of the Year Award and Gatorade national awards. In 2016, she was a McDonald's and Jordan Brand Classic All-American, and Morgan Wootten National Player of the Year.

Among the women's class of 2016, ESPNW ranked Dangerfield as the best point guard and third overall of 100 women players (behind Lauren Cox and ahead of Sabrina Ionescu).

== College ==
Dangerfield was recruited by the UConn Huskies, and she studied business and majored in communication. When Dangerfield arrived, the Huskies had won a record 11 total and 4 straight NCAA championships, but during the period she played for them they were to lose three and have one canceled due to COVID-19.

Dangerfield had offseason hip surgeries in 2016 and 2019. In 2018, she said her quads had gotten too big and she was bothered by shin splints during 2017, her sophomore year. After surgery in 2019, she experienced back spasms and at one point her team had only eight healthy players. The Associated Press said in her senior year at UConn that she was "expected to be the team's leader."

Following the 2019–20 season, Dangerfield was named an Honorable Mention All-American by the Associated Press. She was selected for the American Athletic Conference 2017 All-Freshman Team, 2018 All-Tournament Team, 2018 Third Team, 2019 All-Tournament Team, 2019 First Team, 2020 All-Tournament Team, and 2020 First Team; and the 2019 NCAA Regional All-Tournament Team.

Dangerfield ranks 6th in assists and 9th in three pointers made all-time among UConn women's basketball players. Her favorite players are Kobe Bryant and Maya Moore.

== WNBA ==
=== Minnesota Lynx (2020–2021) ===
Dangerfield was drafted with the 16th overall pick in the 2nd round of the 2020 WNBA draft by the Minnesota Lynx. Lynx coaches had explained to her that her rookie's role would be as a sub to provide relief for a few minutes per game. By midseason, due to multiple WNBA injuries and Odyssey Sims return from maternity leave, Dangerfield was the starting point guard, averaging 14.3 points per game, shooting 47.1% from the field, and was considered a candidate for WNBA Rookie of the Year, the lowest draft pick ever officially considered for the honor.

For August, she gained WNBA's formal recognition with a Rookie of the Month award for her record of 18.1 points per game, 3.5 assists per game and 2.0 rebounds per game. She repeated as Rookie of the Month in September with 17.4 points per game, 5.0 assists per game and 2.0 rebounds per game.

In her rookie season, Dangerfield was named to the 2020 AP All-Rookie team. She won the Associated Press Rookie of the Year, ESPN Rookie of the Year, and WNBA Rookie of the Year. She was the Lynx leading scorer for the year with 16.2 points per game.

On 3 May 2022, Dangerfield was waived by the Lynx.

=== Indiana Fever ===
On 6 May 2022, Dangerfield signed a hardship exception contract with the Indiana Fever.

=== New York Liberty ===
On May 21, 2022, Dangerfield signed a hardship exception contract with the Liberty.

On June 7, 2022, the Liberty ended Dangerfield's contract, but signed a second hardship exception contract two days later., but then she was released on June 26. On July 3, 2022, the Liberty signed Dangerfield to a rest of season contract.

=== Dallas Wings ===
On January 16, 2023, Dangerfield was traded to the Dallas Wings as part of a three-team deal.

=== Atlanta Dream ===
On May 4, 2024, the Wings traded Dangerfield to the Atlanta Dream in exchange for a 2025 draft pick. After appearing in fifteen games for the Dream, she was waived on June 26, 2024.

=== Los Angeles Sparks ===
On July 4, 2024, Dangerfield signed a 7-day hardship contract with the Los Angeles Sparks. On July 13, 2024, Dangerfield signed a second 7-day hardship contract.

== Career statistics ==
Legend
GP	Games played	GS	Games started	MPG	Minutes per game	RPG	Rebounds per game
APG	Assists per game	SPG	Steals per game	BPG	Blocks per game	PPG	Points per game
TO	Turnovers per game	FG%	Field-goal percentage	3P%	3-point field-goal percentage	FT%	Free-throw percentage
**Bold**	Career best	°	League leader

=== WNBA ===
==== Regular season ====
Stats current through end of 2024 season

WNBA regular season statistics
Year	Team	GP	GS	MPG	FG%	3P%	FT%	RPG	APG	SPG	BPG	TO	PPG
2020	Minnesota	21	19	**30.0**	**.471**	.333	.922	2.0	**3.6**	**0.9**	0.0	2.6	**16.2**
2021	Minnesota	31	10	20.1	.388	**.359**	.857	2.0	2.8	0.7	0.1	1.4	7.7
2022	Indiana	3	0	16.3	.429	.333	**1.000**	1.0	3.3	0.0	**0.7**	1.0	6.0
2022	New York	30	27	22.1	.395	.323	.700	2.1	2.5	0.6	0.1	0.9	5.4
2023	Dallas	**35**	**32**	27.8	.425	.290	.815	**2.9**	3.1	**0.9**	0.2	1.2	8.2
2024	Atlanta	15	0	14.1	.278	.217	**1.000**	1.1	1.7	0.3	0.2	**0.6**	3.1
2024	Los Angeles	18	5	12.8	.286	.308	.667	1.0	2.0	0.4	0.2	0.9	3.3
**Career**	6 years, 6 teams	153	93	22.1	.407	.318	.853	2.0	2.7	0.7	0.1	1.3	7.5

==== Playoffs ====
WNBA playoff statistics
Year	Team	GP	GS	MPG	FG%	3P%	FT%	RPG	APG	SPG	BPG	TO	PPG
2020	Minnesota	4	**4**	**34.0**	**.340**	.250	.636	**2.8**	**3.8**	**1.0**	**0.0**	2.0	**11.8**
2021	Minnesota	1	0	24.0	.200	.000	—	1.0	2.0	**1.0**	**0.0**	2.0	2.0
2022	New York	3	2	9.0	.273	.250	—	0.3	0.3	0.0	0.0	0.7	2.3
2022	Dallas	**5**	3	11.6	**.533**	**.333**	**1.000**	1.4	1.0	0.2	0.0	**0.2**	4.6
**Career**	4 years, 3 teams	8	6	23.4	.319	.227	.636	1.6	2.3	0.6	0.0	1.5	7.0

=== College ===
NCAA statistics
Year	Team	GP	GS	MPG	FG%	3P%	FT%	RPG	APG	SPG	BPG	TO	PPG
2016–17	UConn	31	6	24.0	.403	.317	.593	2.2	3.7	0.9	0.0	1.7	6.1
2017–18	UConn	35	35	28.7	.454	**.449**	.806	2.1	4.1	1.7	0.0	**1.5**	9.5
2018–19	UConn	**38**	**38**	34.9	.431	.352	**.924**	3.3	**5.9**	1.6	**0.1**	1.9	13.4
2019–20	UConn	30	30	**35.4**	**.463**	.410	.860	**3.7**	3.9	**1.8**	**0.1**	1.7	**14.9**
**Career**		134	109	30.9	.441	.385	.833	2.8	4.5	1.5	0.1	1.7	11.0

== Personal life ==
Dangerfield has participated in numerous charities such as Let's Move!, the Foundation for Life, Bikes for Kids, and Athletes for Hope, as well as food banks. In college, she helped Bags of Love, a 501(c)(3) nonprofit organization that supports children, teens, and young adults impacted by cancer, to provide toiletries to homeless people in Connecticut.

Dangerfield is a lesbian.
