= Kaila Charles =

American basketball player (born 1998)

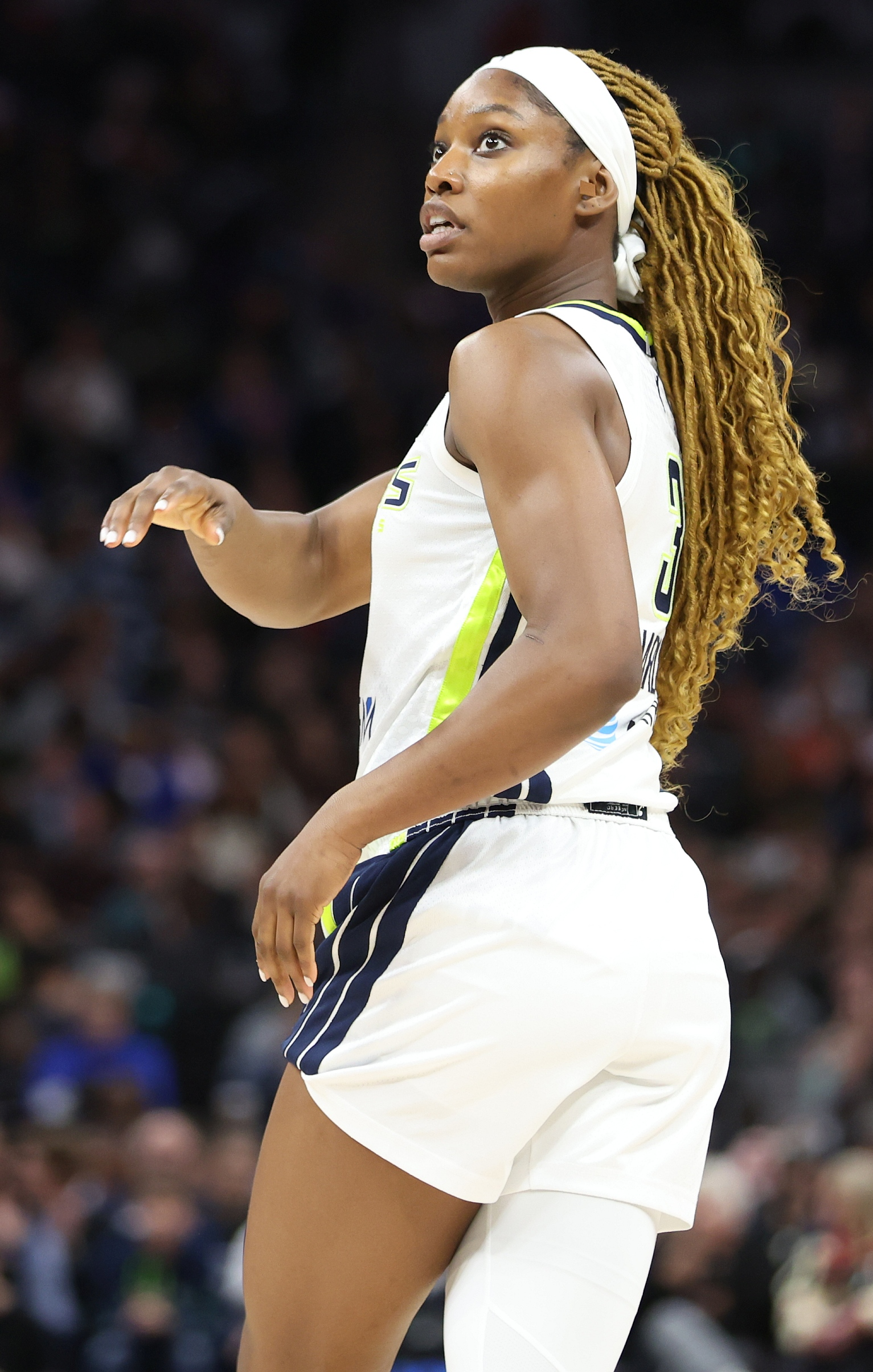
- Charles with the Dallas Wings in 2025

No. 6 – Golden State Valkyries
- Position: Shooting guard / small forward
- League: WNBA

Personal information
- Born: March 23, 1998 (age 28) Glenn Dale, Maryland, U.S.
- Listed height: 6 ft 1 in (1.85 m)
- Listed weight: 168 lb (76 kg)

Career information
- High school: Riverdale Baptist (Upper Marlboro, Maryland)
- College: Maryland (2016–2020)
- WNBA draft: 2020: 2nd round, 23rd overall pick
- Drafted by: Connecticut Sun
- Playing career: 2020–present

Career history
- 2020–2021: Connecticut Sun
- 2022: Atlanta Dream
- 2023: Seattle Storm
- 2023–2025: DVTK HUN-Therm
- 2025: Dallas Wings
- 2025–present: Golden State Valkyries
- 2025–present: Reyer Venezia

Career highlights
- WNBA champion (2026); Third-team All-American – AP, USBWA (2020); 3× First-team All-Big Ten (2018–2020); Big Ten All-Freshman Team (2017); McDonald's All-American (2016)
- Stats at Basketball Reference

Kaila Charles (/ˈkaɪlə/ KY-lə; born March 23, 1998) is an American professional basketball player for the Golden State Valkyries of the Women's National Basketball Association (WNBA) and for Reyer Venezia of the Lega Basket Femminile. She played college basketball for the Maryland Terrapins. She was drafted by the Connecticut Sun with the 23rd overall pick in the 2020 WNBA draft. She also previously played for the Atlanta Dream, Seattle Storm, and Dallas Wings in the WNBA.

== Early life ==
=== High school ===
Charles hails from Glenn Dale, Maryland. For her first three years of high school, she attended Eleanor Roosevelt High School in nearby Greenbelt, where her teams had a combined 72 and 5 record. While at Eleanor Roosevelt, Charles' teams won two Maryland Public Secondary Schools Athletic Association Class AAAA state championships (2014 and 2015). Charles also earned Washington Post All-Metro honors as a sophomore and junior. She transferred her senior year to Riverdale Baptist School in Upper Marlboro, and helped the team to a national championship game. She was a McDonalds and Women's Basketball Coaches Association All-American selection as a senior, and also received All-Metro Player of The Year honors from the Post.

=== Recruiting ===
Charles was ranked as the 25th best player in her national class by ESPN and the Collegiate Girls Report, though the All Star Girls Report had her ranked as high as 21st. She was a highly-sought player as a five-star recruit, and received over 30 scholarship offers, eventually signing with Brenda Frese and the nearby Maryland Terrapins over Tennessee and South Carolina.

== College career ==
=== Freshman season (2016–17) ===
Charles earned a double-double in her first game and saw a large amount of playing time. She was eventually named to the Big Ten All-Freshman Team.

=== Sophomore season (2017–18) ===
As a sophomore, Charles was named a Preseason All-Big Ten team member, as well as a preseason Ann Meyers Drysdale Award watch list member. Charles became the third player in program history to score 600 points as a second year player, and her 17.9 points per game remain the highest-ever for a Maryland sophomore. Charles earned her first Big Ten Player of the Week honors as a sophomore, and finished the season as a First Team All-Big Ten selection.

=== Junior season (2018–19) ===
Charles received Player of the Week in February of this season, and finished the season receiving Associated Press and WBCA Honorable Mention All-American honors, and becoming a Cheryl Miller Award finalist. She was also a unanimous First Team All-Big Ten selection, and appeared on the watchlist for the Wade Trophy.

=== Senior season (2019–2020) ===
Prior to the 2019-20 season, she was named an AP Preseason All-American, as well as the preseason Big Ten Player of the Year. Charles was Big Ten, United States Basketball Writers Association, and ESPNW player of the week for December 30, and would receive Big Ten Player of the Week Honors once again in February. Charles finished her Maryland career by winning the 2020 Big Ten women's basketball tournament, the first time the team had done so since her freshman year, after losing to Ohio State and Iowa in the championship game the two previous years.

Charles became one of six players in program history to be in the program's top ten scorers and rebounders, holding sixth place for both. She also tied Sun teammate Alyssa Thomas' record of career starts (135), as she started every game of her career.

== Professional career ==
=== WNBA ===
==== Connecticut Sun (2020–2021) ====
Charles was drafted by the Connecticut Sun with the 23rd pick in the second round of the 2020 WNBA draft. She appeared in 21 games for the Sun in her rookie year, starting seven. She averaged 5.4 points and 2.6 rebounds over 17.9 minutes per game. Despite being the seventh seed (of eight) in the 2020 WNBA Playoffs, the Sun made it to the semifinals before losing to the Las Vegas Aces in five games.

Charles was waived by the Sun on May 5, 2022. On May 6, Charles joined the New York Liberty on a hardship contract. Two days later, she was released from the hardship and did not appear in any games.

==== Atlanta Dream (2022) ====
On August 12, 2022, Charles signed with the Atlanta Dream on a hardship contract. She played only two minutes in one game.

==== Seattle Storm (2023) ====
On February 6, 2023, Charles signed a training camp contract with the Seattle Storm. She made the opening day roster. She appeared in four games but was waived by the Storm on June 8.

==== Dallas Wings (2025) ====
On February 2, 2025, Charles signed a training camp contract with the Dallas Wings. She made the opening day roster. On June 14, she was waived by the Wings. However, the Wings signed her to a hardship contract on June 17. On June 30, she was released by the Wings. Overall Charles appeared in 17 games for Dallas, averaging 5.3 points and 4.0 rebounds.

==== Golden State Valkyries (2025–present) ====
On August 1, 2025, Charles signed a seven-day hardship contract with the Golden State Valkyries. On August 22, she signed a rest of season contract with the Valkyries.

In April 2026, Charles signed a two-year contract with the Valkyries.

=== Overseas ===
==== DVTK HUN-Therm ====
On July 4, 2023, Charles signed with Hungarian team DVTK HUN-Therm in the EuroLeague to play in 2023 after the completion of the WNBA season.

==== Venezia ====
Charles signed with Reyer Venezia (women) of the Lega Basket Femminile for the 2025–26 season.

== Career statistics ==
=== WNBA ===
Legend
GP	Games played	GS	Games started	MPG	Minutes per game	RPG	Rebounds per game
APG	Assists per game	SPG	Steals per game	BPG	Blocks per game	PPG	Points per game
TO	Turnovers per game	FG%	Field-goal percentage	3P%	3-point field-goal percentage	FT%	Free-throw percentage
**Bold**	Career best	°	League leader

†	Denotes season(s) in which Charles won a WNBA championship

==== Regular season ====
WNBA regular season statistics
Year	Team	GP	GS	MPG	FG%	3P%	FT%	RPG	APG	SPG	BPG	TO	PPG
2020	Connecticut	21	7	17.9	.412	**.367**	.710	2.6	.9	.8	.3	.9	5.4
2021	Connecticut	30	4	16.3	.368	.303	**.875**	2.8	1.1	.5	**.4**	.9	4.3
2022	Atlanta	1	0	2.0	—	—	—	.0	.0	.0	.0	**.0**	.0
2023	Seattle	4	0	10.3	.250	.000	—	1.3	.3	.3	.0	**.0**	1.5
2024	Did not appear in league												
2025	Dallas	17	4	15.8	.363	.333	.815	4.0	1.1	.5	.2	.9	5.3
2025	Golden State	18	8	19.3	**.463**	.357	.818	4.5	.9	**1.1**	.2	1.2	**7.4**
2026^{†}	Golden State	**44**°	**11**	**20.2**	.406	.276	.768	**4.7**	**1.4**	.8	.3	1.0	6.3
**Career**	6 years, 5 teams	135	34	17.9	.401	.311	.788	3.7	1.1	.7	.3	.9	5.5

==== Playoffs ====
Year	Team	GP	GS	MPG	FG%	3P%	FT%	RPG	APG	SPG	BPG	TO	PPG
2020	Connecticut	7	0	11.7	**.375**	.182	**1.000**	1.7	.4	.1	.1	1.3	4.0
2021	Connecticut	4	1	13.3	.313	.000	—	3.0	.8	.3	.3	**.3**	2.5
2025	Golden State	2	2	22.5	.250	**.500**	—	2.5	**2.0**	**1.5**	**.5**	.5	3.5
2026^{†}	Golden State	**13**	**4**	**23.7**	.373	.367	.813	**4.9**	1.2	.6	.4	1.2	**5.7**
Career	4 years, 2 teams	26	7	18.8	.353	.318	.875	3.6	1.0	.5	.3	1.0	4.6

=== College ===
Ratios
Year	Team	GP	FG%	3P%	FT%	RBG	APG	BPG	SPG	PPG
2016–17	Maryland	**35**	**.511**	—	.685	5.6	1.2	.5	1.3	9.7
2017–18	Maryland	34	.503	**.333**	.732	**8.1**	2.1	**1.1**	**1.6**	**17.9**
2018–19	Maryland	33	.486	.071	**.805**	6.9	**2.3**	.7	1.3	17.6
2019–20	Maryland	32	.500	.300	.695	7.3	2.2	.6	**1.6**	14.3
Career		134	.499	.222	.740	6.9	2.0	.7	1.4	14.8

Totals
Year	Team	GP	FG	FGA	3P	3PA	FT	FTA	REB	A	BK	ST	PTS
2016-17	Maryland	**35**	139	272	0	3	61	89	195	43	18	44	339
2017-18	Maryland	34	**246**	**489**	**6**	**18**	112	153	**275**	72	**36**	**53**	610
2018-19	Maryland	33	221	455	1	14	**136**	**169**	228	**77**	23	43	**579**
2019-20	Maryland	32	190	380	3	10	73	105	232	71	20	51	456
Career		134	796	1596	10	45	382	516	930	263	97	191	1984

=== EuroLeague ===
Year	Team	GP	MPG	PPG	PTS	RPG	APG	FGM–FGA	FG%	3PM–3PA	3P%	FTM–FTA	FT%
2023–24	DVTK HUN-Therm	19	32.9	11.5	219	8.3	2.8	4.3–12.5	.346	.8–2.7	.314	2.1–2.9	.696

== Personal life ==
Charles' mother, Ruperta Charles, competed in the 100 meter dash at the 1984 Summer Olympics on behalf of Antigua and Barbuda after attending Howard University. She has three older siblings. Her sister, Afia, was a track athlete at the University of Central Florida and represented Antigua and Barbuda in the 2012 Olympic Games in London. Her brother Akil plays basketball at St. Francis Xavier University in Nova Scotia, Canada.
