= 2020 WNBA draft =

Draft of incoming WNBA players for the 2020 season

2020 WNBA Draft

General information
- Sport: Basketball
- Date: April 17, 2020
- Location: Virtually
- Networks: USA: ESPN; Canada: TSN2/SN1

Overview
- League: WNBA
- Teams: 12
- First selection: Sabrina Ionescu; New York Liberty

The 2020 WNBA draft was the league's draft for the 2020 WNBA season. A draft lottery was held on September 17, 2019 and the New York Liberty were awarded the first overall pick in the draft. Due to the COVID-19 pandemic the draft was held virtually without players, guests, and the media on-site. The draft was televised as planned; it was the most-watched WNBA draft in 16 years and the second most-watched in ESPN's history.

== Draft lottery ==
The lottery selection to determine the order of the top four picks in the 2020 draft took place during halftime of the Connecticut Sun's semifinal game against the Los Angeles Sparks on September 17, 2019 and was televised on ESPN2. Four non-playoff teams qualified for the lottery drawing: Indiana Fever, Dallas Wings, New York Liberty, and Atlanta Dream.

The lottery odds were based on combined records from the 2018 and 2019 WNBA seasons. In the drawing, 14 balls numbered 1–14 are placed in a lottery machine and mixed. Four balls are drawn to determine a four-digit combination (only 11–12–13–14 is ignored & redrawn). The team assigned that four-ball combination receives the No. 1 pick. The four balls are then placed back into the machine and the process is repeated to determine the second pick. The two teams whose numerical combinations do not come up in the lottery will select in the inverse order of their two-year cumulative record. Ernst & Young knows the discreet results before they're announced.

The order of selection for the remainder of the first round as well as the second and third rounds was determined by inverse order of the teams' respective regular-season records from 2019.

=== Lottery chances ===
The lottery was won by the New York Liberty, who had the best chance to win the lottery. The Dallas Wings were awarded the second pick, followed by the Indiana Fever and finally the Atlanta Dream.

Note: Team selected for the No. 1 pick noted in bold text.

Team	Combined 2018–19 Record	Lottery Chances	Result
**New York Liberty**	**17–51**	**44.2%**	**1st pick**
Indiana Fever	19–49	27.6%	3rd pick
Dallas Wings	25–43	17.8%	2nd pick
Atlanta Dream	31–37	10.4%	4th pick

== Eligibility ==
Under the current collective bargaining agreement (CBA) between the WNBA and its players union, draft eligibility for players not defined as "international" requires the following to be true:

- The player's 22nd birthday falls during the calendar year of the draft. For this draft, the cutoff birth date is December 31, 1998.
- She has either:
  - completed her college eligibility;
  - received a bachelor's degree, or is scheduled to receive such in the 3 months following the draft; or
  - is at least 4 years removed from high school graduation.

A player who is scheduled to receive her bachelor's degree within 3 months of the draft date, and is younger than the cutoff age, is only eligible if the calendar year of the draft is no earlier than the fourth after her high school graduation.

Players with remaining college eligibility who meet the cutoff age must notify the WNBA headquarters of their intent to enter the draft no later than 10 days before the draft date, and must renounce any remaining college eligibility to do so. A separate notification timetable is provided for players involved in postseason tournaments (most notably the NCAA Division I tournament); those players must declare for the draft within 24 hours of their final game. The latter timetable proved to be moot due to the coronavirus-induced cancellation of the 2020 NCAA tournament.

"International players" are defined as those for whom all of the following is true:

- Born and currently residing outside the U.S.
- Never "exercised intercollegiate basketball eligibility" in the U.S.

For "international players", the eligibility age is 20, also measured on December 31 of the year of the draft.

Three players with remaining college eligibility, all of whom were juniors in the 2019–20 college season, declared for the draft. All three were drafted in the first round:

- Satou Sabally of Oregon announced on February 20 that she would enter the draft upon the end of Oregon's 2019–20 season. Although a German citizen, she falls under the rules for U.S. players not only because of playing at Oregon, but also via her birth in New York City.
- Megan Walker of UConn declared on March 14, after the cancellation of the NCAA tournament.
- Chennedy Carter of Texas A&M declared on March 29.

== Draft ==
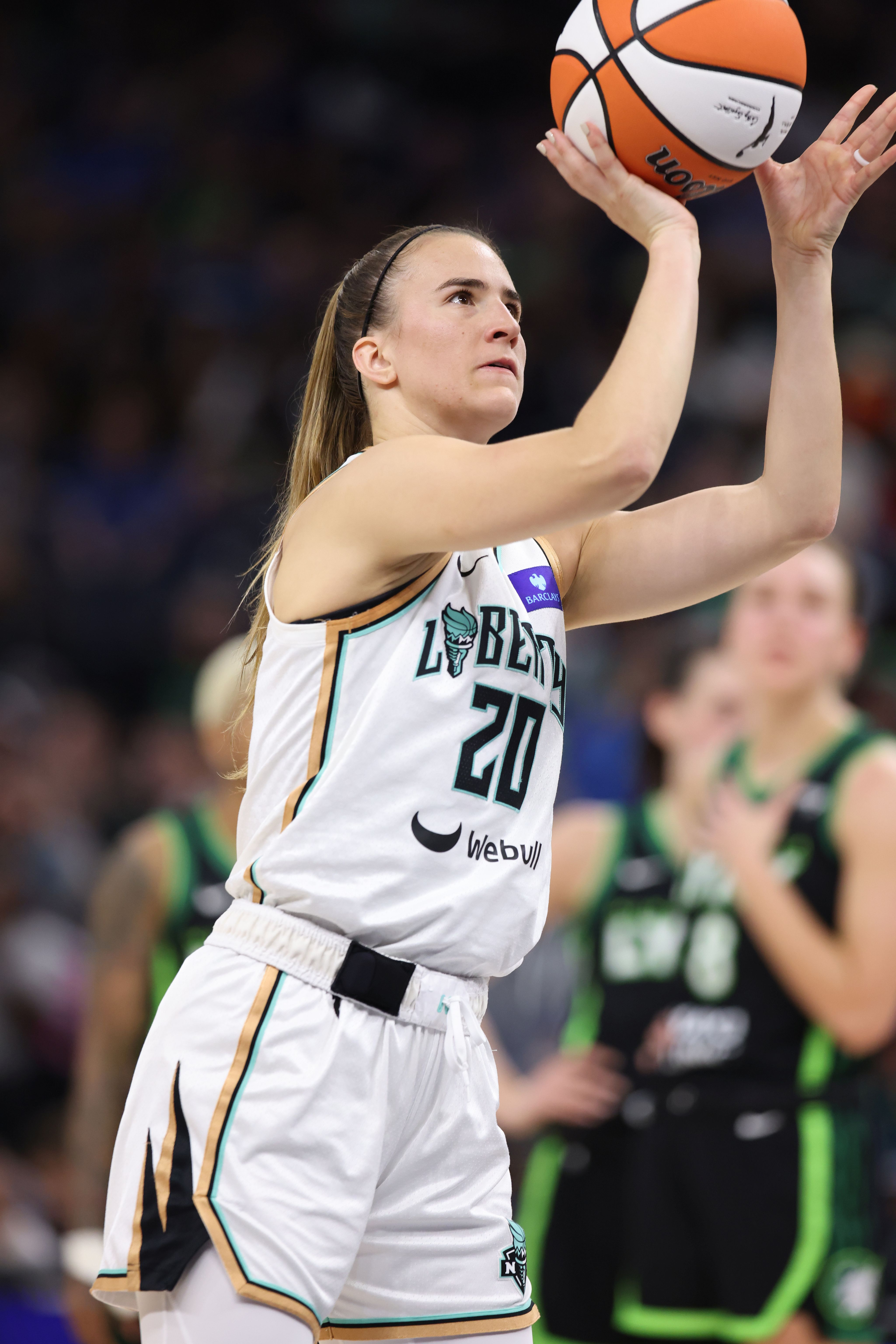
Sabrina Ionescu was selected 1st overall by the New York Liberty.

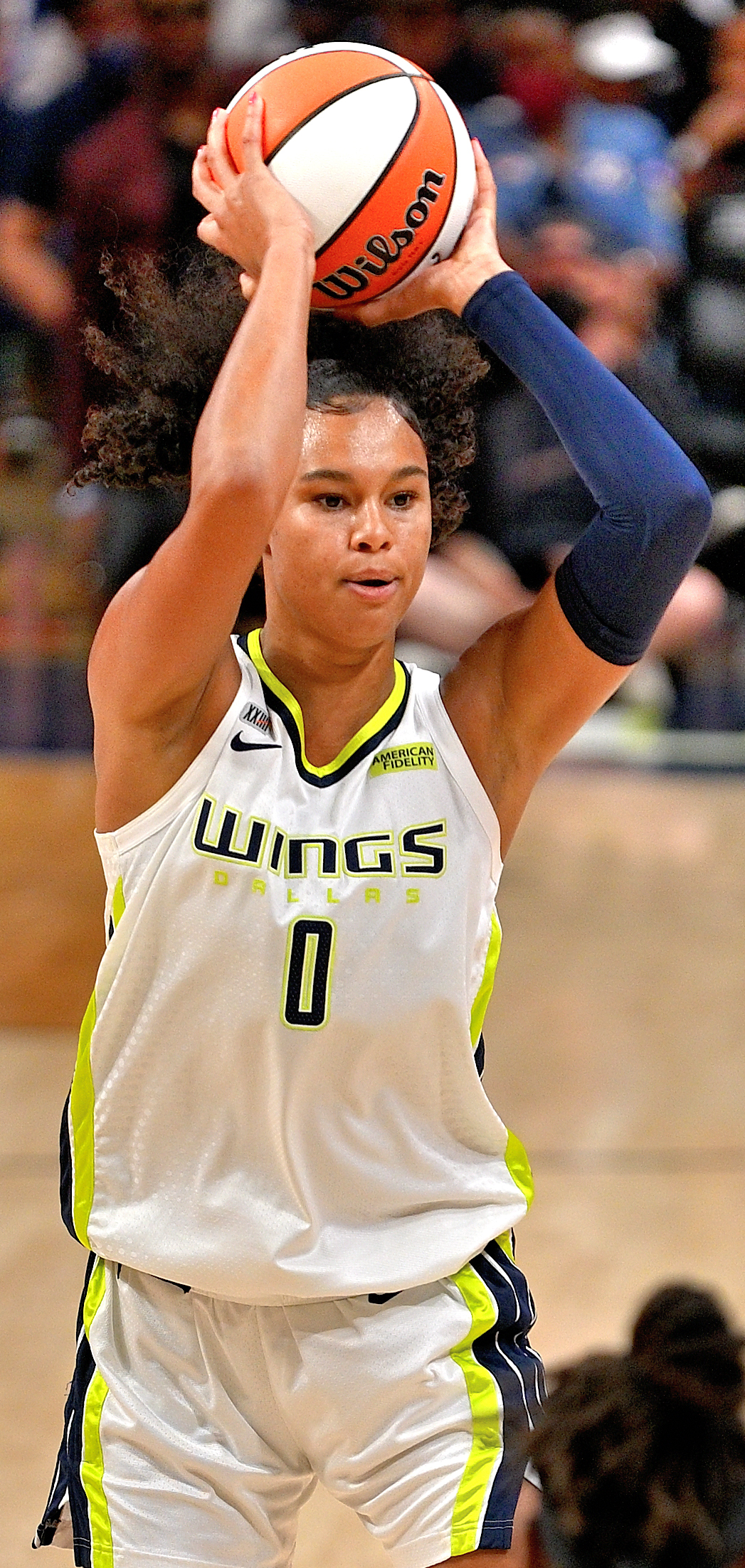
Satou Sabally was selected 2nd overall by the Dallas Wings.

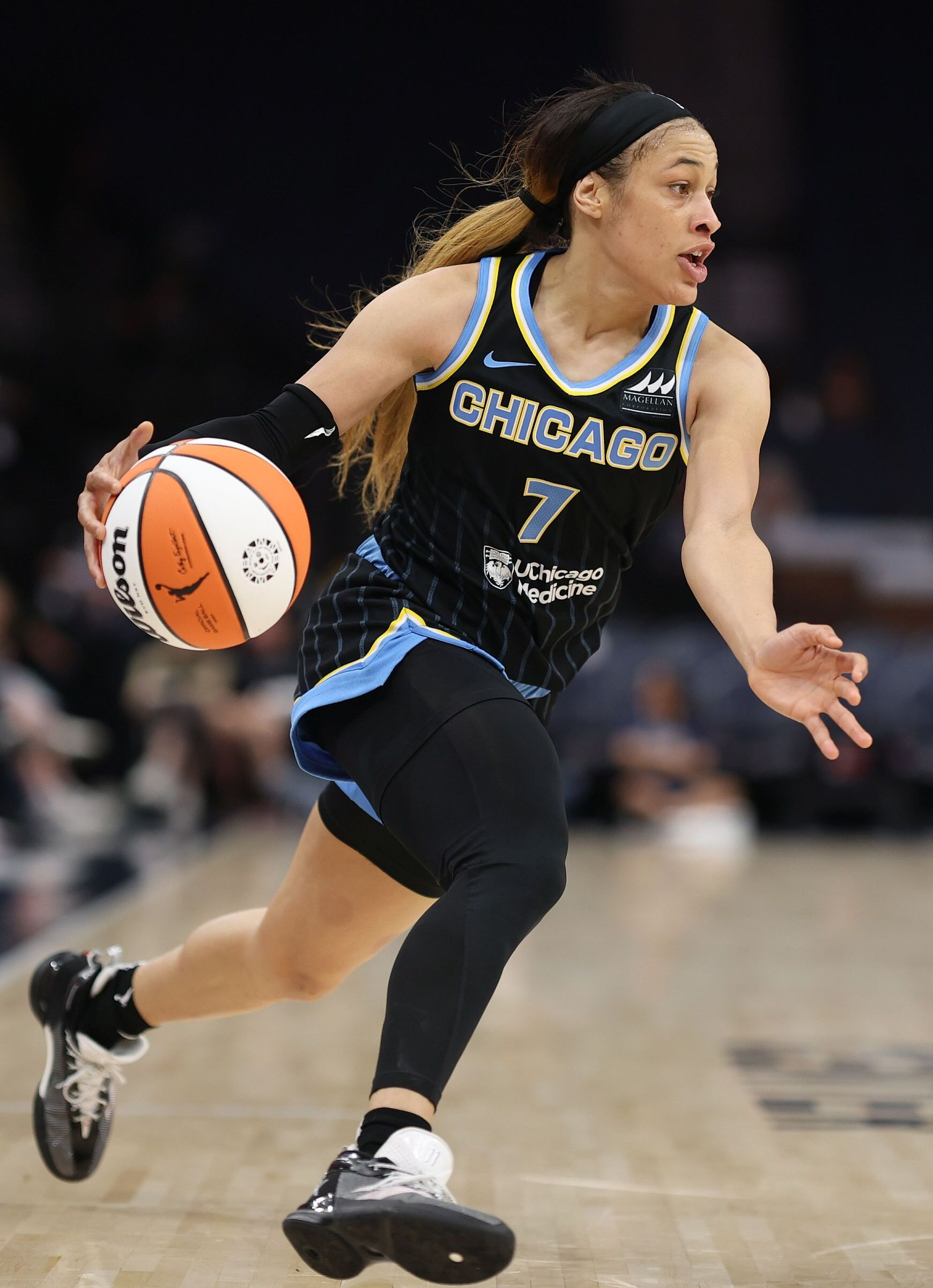
Chennedy Carter was selected 4th overall by the Atlanta Dream.

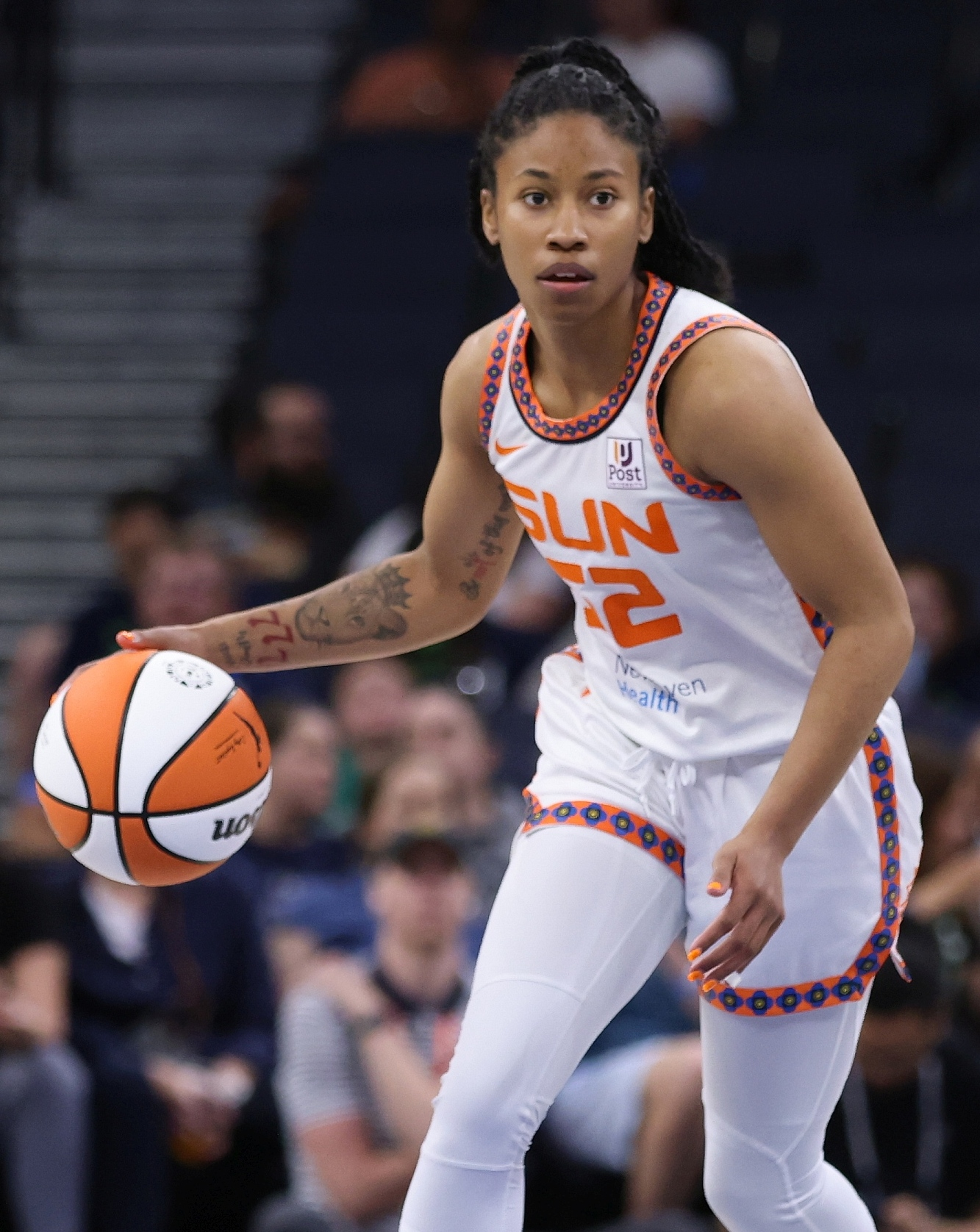
Tyasha Harris was selected 7th overall by the Dallas Wings.

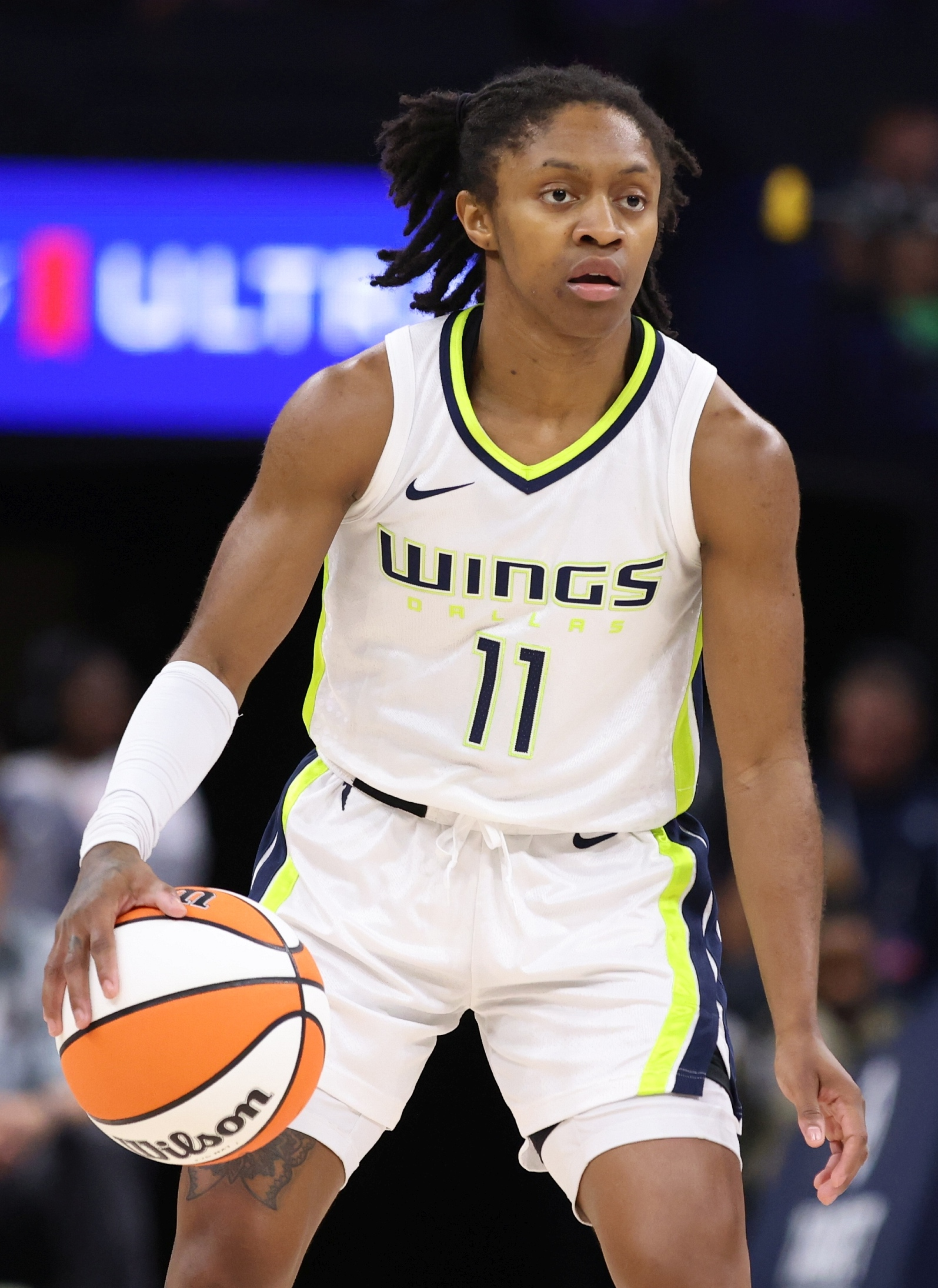
Crystal Dangerfield was selected 16th overall by the Minnesota Lynx. She became the first second-round pick to win the WNBA Rookie of the Year Award.

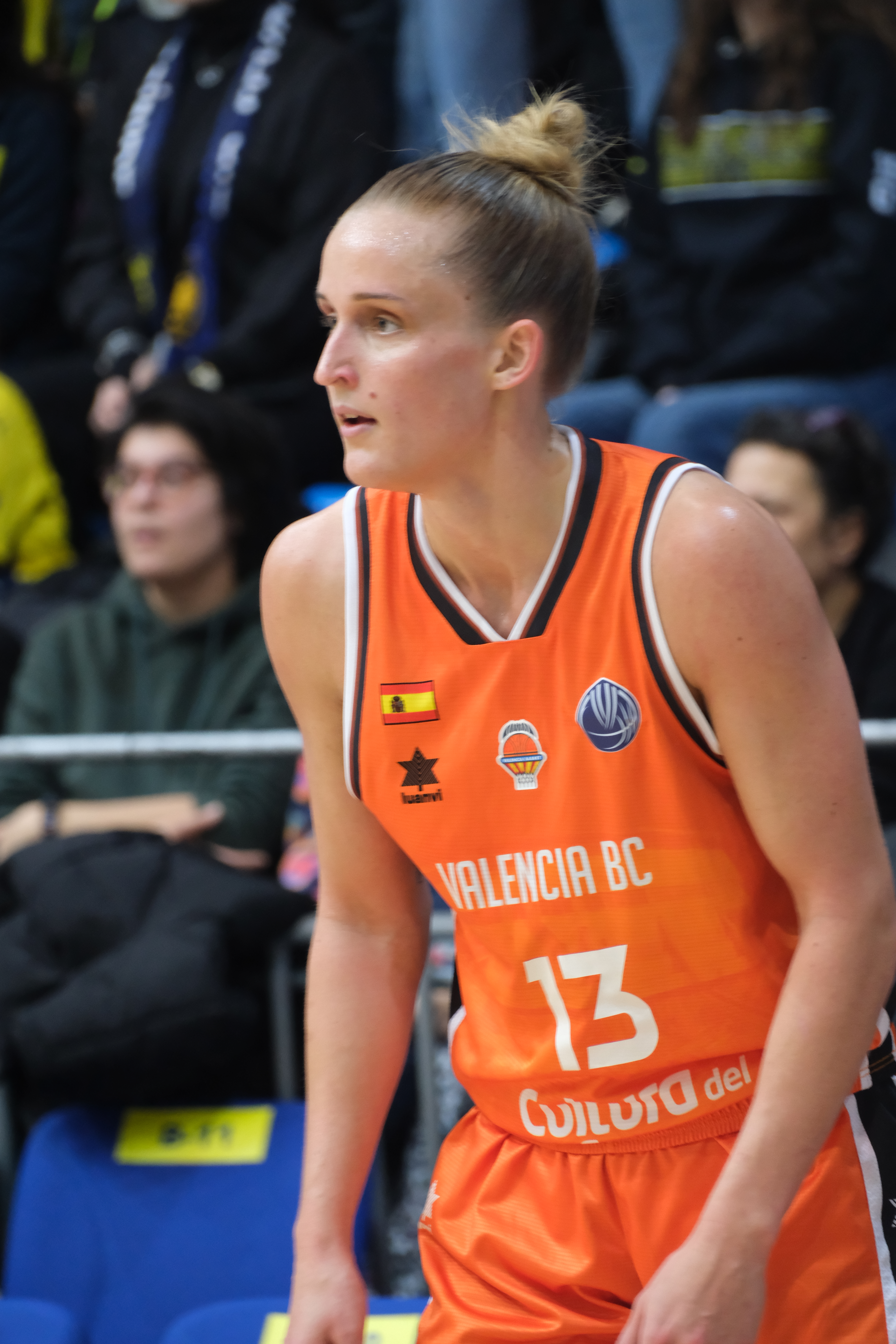
Leonie Fiebich was selected 22nd overall by the Los Angeles Sparks.

*	Denotes player who has been selected for at least one All-Star Game and All-WNBA Team
^{+}	Denotes player who has been selected for at least one All-Star Game
^{#}	Denotes player who never played in the WNBA regular season or playoffs
**Bold**	Denotes player who won Rookie of the Year

=== Honorary picks ===
The WNBA honored Alyssa Altobelli, Payton Chester, and Gianna Bryant, daughter of Hall of Fame basketball player Kobe Bryant, who all died in the 2020 Calabasas helicopter crash, with honorary draft picks.

=== First round ===
Pick	Player	Position	Nationality	Team	School / club team
1	Sabrina Ionescu ^{*}	G	United States	New York Liberty	Oregon
2	Satou Sabally ^{*}	F	Germany	Dallas Wings	Oregon
3	Lauren Cox	F/C	United States	Indiana Fever	Baylor
4	Chennedy Carter	G	United States	Atlanta Dream	Texas A&M
5	Bella Alarie	F	United States	Dallas Wings (from Phoenix) (Note: February 12, 2020: Phoenix to Dallas: Dallas acquired the fifth and seventh picks and a future first-round pick; Phoenix acquired Skylar Diggins-Smith)	Princeton
6	Mikiah Herbert Harrigan	F	United Kingdom	Minnesota Lynx	South Carolina
7	Tyasha Harris	G	United States	Dallas Wings (from Seattle via Connecticut and Phoenix) (Note: February 10, 2020: Connecticut to Seattle: Connecticut acquired the seventh pick; Seattle acquired the 11th pick and Morgan Tuck) (Note: February 11, 2020: Connecticut to Phoenix: Phoenix acquired the seventh and tenth picks and a 2021 first-round pick; Connecticut acquired DeWanna Bonner)	South Carolina
8	Ruthy Hebard	F	United States	Chicago Sky	Oregon
9	Megan Walker	F	United States	New York Liberty (from Las Vegas via Dallas) (Note: May 16, 2019: Las Vegas to Dallas: Dallas acquired the ninth and 21st picks, Moriah Jefferson, and Isabelle Harrison; Las Vegas acquired Liz Cambage) (Note: April 15, 2020: Three-team trade: New York acquired the 12th pick; Shatori Walker-Kimbrough; and 2021 first, second, and third-round picks from Washington; Las Vegas's first-round pick (ninth overall), the 15th pick, and Tayler Hill from Dallas; Washington acquired Tina Charles from New York; Dallas acquired Washington's 2021 first-round pick and a 2021 second-round pick from New York)	UConn
10	Jocelyn Willoughby	F/G	United States	Phoenix Mercury (from Los Angeles via Connecticut) (Note: April 27, 2019: Los Angeles to Connecticut: Connecticut acquired the tenth pick; Los Angeles acquired Chiney Ogwumike)	Virginia
11	Kitija Laksa	F	Latvia	Seattle Storm (from Connecticut)	South Florida/TTT Riga (Latvia)
12	Jazmine Jones	G	United States	New York Liberty (from Washington)	Louisville

=== Second round ===
Pick	Player	Position	Nationality	Team	School / club team
13	Kylee Shook	F	United States	New York Liberty (from Atlanta) (Note: April 11, 2019: Atlanta to New York (three-team trade with Las Vegas): New York acquired the 13th pick from Atlanta; Atlanta acquired Nia Coffey from Las Vegas; Las Vegas acquired Sugar Rodgers from New York)	Louisville
14	Kathleen Doyle	G	United States	Indiana Fever (from New York via Minnesota) (Note: April 11, 2019: New York to Minnesota: Minnesota acquired the 14th pick; New York acquired Tanisha Wright) (Note: March 6, 2020: Minnesota to Indiana: Indiana acquired the 14th pick and a 2021 second-round pick; Minnesota acquired Shenise Johnson and the 16th pick)	Iowa
15	Leaonna Odom	F	United States	New York Liberty (from Dallas)	Duke
16	**Crystal Dangerfield**	G	United States	Minnesota Lynx (from Indiana)	UConn
17	Brittany Brewer	F	United States	Atlanta Dream (from Phoenix) (Note: February 19, 2020: Phoenix to Atlanta (three-team trade with Connecticut): Atlanta acquired the 17th pick from Phoenix and Courtney Williams from Connecticut; Phoenix acquired Jessica Breland and Nia Coffey from Atlanta; Connecticut acquired Briann January and a 2021 second-round pick from Phoenix)	Texas Tech
18	Te'a Cooper	G	United States	Phoenix Mercury (from Minnesota) (Note: May 21, 2019: Minnesota to Phoenix: Phoenix acquired the 18th pick; Minnesota acquired Stephanie Talbot)	Baylor
19	Joyner Holmes	F	United States	Seattle Storm	Texas
20	Beatrice Mompremier	F	United States	Los Angeles Sparks (from Chicago) (Note: May 20, 2019: Chicago to Los Angeles: Los Angeles acquired the 20th pick; Chicago acquired Jantel Lavender)	Miami (FL)
21	Luisa Geiselsöder	C	Germany	Dallas Wings (from Las Vegas)	Donau-Ries (Germany)
22	Leonie Fiebich	F	Germany	Los Angeles Sparks	Wasserburg (Germany)
23	Kaila Charles	G	United States	Connecticut Sun	Maryland
24	Jaylyn Agnew	F	United States	Washington Mystics	Creighton

=== Third round ===
Pick	Player	Position	Nationality	Team	School / club team
25	Mikayla Pivec^{#}	G	United States	Atlanta Dream	Oregon State
26	Erica Ogwumike^{#}	G	United States	New York Liberty	Rice
27	Kobi Thornton^{#}	F	United States	Atlanta Dream (from Dallas) (Note: May 16, 2019: Dallas to Atlanta: Atltanta acquired the 27th pick; Dallas acquired Imani McGee-Stafford)	Clemson
28	Kamiah Smalls	G	United States	Indiana Fever	James Madison
29	Stella Johnson	G	United States	Phoenix Mercury	Rider
30	Japreece Dean^{#}	G	United States	Chicago Sky (from Minnesota) (Note: May 21, 2019: Minnesota to Chicago: Chicago acquired the 30th pick; Minnesota acquired Alaina Coates)	UCLA
31	Haley Gorecki	G	United States	Seattle Storm	Duke
32	Kiah Gillespie^{#}	F	United States	Chicago Sky	Florida State
33	Lauren Manis^{#}	F	United States	Las Vegas Aces	Holy Cross
34	Tynice Martin^{#}	G	United States	Los Angeles Sparks	West Virginia
35	Juicy Landrum^{#}	G	United States	Connecticut Sun	Baylor
36	Sug Sutton	G	United States	Washington Mystics	Texas

== See also ==
- List of first overall WNBA draft picks
