= Tynice Martin =

American basketball player

Personal information
- Born: 26 March 1997 (age 28)
- Listed height: 5 ft 11 in (1.80 m)

Career information
- High school: Southwest Atlanta (Atlanta, Georgia)
- College: West Virginia (2015–2020)
- WNBA draft: 2020: 3rd round, 34th overall pick
- Drafted by: Los Angeles Sparks
- Playing career: 2020–present
- Position: Guard

Career history
- 2021: Kyiv-Basket
- 2021: Högsbo Basket
- 2022: KBF Prishtina
- 2022–2023: Vimpelin Veto
- 2023: Njarðvík

Career highlights
- 2× First-team All-Big 12 (2017, 2019); Big 12 Freshman of the Year (2017); Big 12 Tournament Most Outstanding Player (2017); Big 12 All-Freshman Team (2016)
- Stats at Basketball Reference

Tynice Nicole Martin (born 26 March 1997) is an American basketball player. She played college basketball for West Virginia where she was a first-team All-Big 12 selection in her sophomore and junior year. She led West Virginia to the 2017 Big 12 Conference Championship while being named the tournament's Most Outstanding Player.

== Professional career ==
Martin was drafted by the Los Angeles Sparks in the 2020 WNBA draft but waived prior to the start of the season.

In January 2021, she signed with Kyiv-Basket in Ukraine and later played for Högsbo Basket in Sweden and KBF Prishtina in Kosovo. During the 2022–2023 season, she played for Vimpelin Veto in the Naisten Korisliiga.

In July 2023, she signed with Njarðvík of the Úrvalsdeild kvenna. She left the club in December the same year after appearing in 7 games where she averaged 16.6 points, 7.1 rebounds and 2.9 assists.

== Career statistics ==
Legend
GP	Games played	GS	Games started	MPG	Minutes per game	RPG	Rebounds per game
APG	Assists per game	SPG	Steals per game	BPG	Blocks per game	PPG	Points per game
TO	Turnovers per game	FG%	Field-goal percentage	3P%	3-point field-goal percentage	FT%	Free-throw percentage
**Bold**	Career best	°	League leader

=== College ===
Year	Team	GP	GS	MPG	FG%	3P%	FT%	RPG	APG	SPG	BPG	TO	PPG
2016–17	West Virginia	**35**	0	23.7	**40.3**	25.5	80.6	3.2	1.5	1.0	0.2	**1.5**	10.3
2017–18	West Virginia	34	**34**	35.6	39.4	36.7	81.5	4.3	**2.4**	**1.8**	**0.3**	1.8	**18.7**
2018–19	West Virginia	32	32	**36.9**	38.0	**37.9**	83.1	**5.8**	1.7	1.6	0.0	1.6	18.0
2019–20	West Virginia	26	25	34.8	36.6	29.0	**86.2**	4.4	1.6	1.3	**0.3**	1.7	15.1
**Career**		127	91	32.5	38.6	33.4	82.8	4.4	1.8	1.4	0.2	1.6	15.5
Statistics retrieved from Sports-Reference.
