= Tyasha Harris =

American basketball player (born 1998)

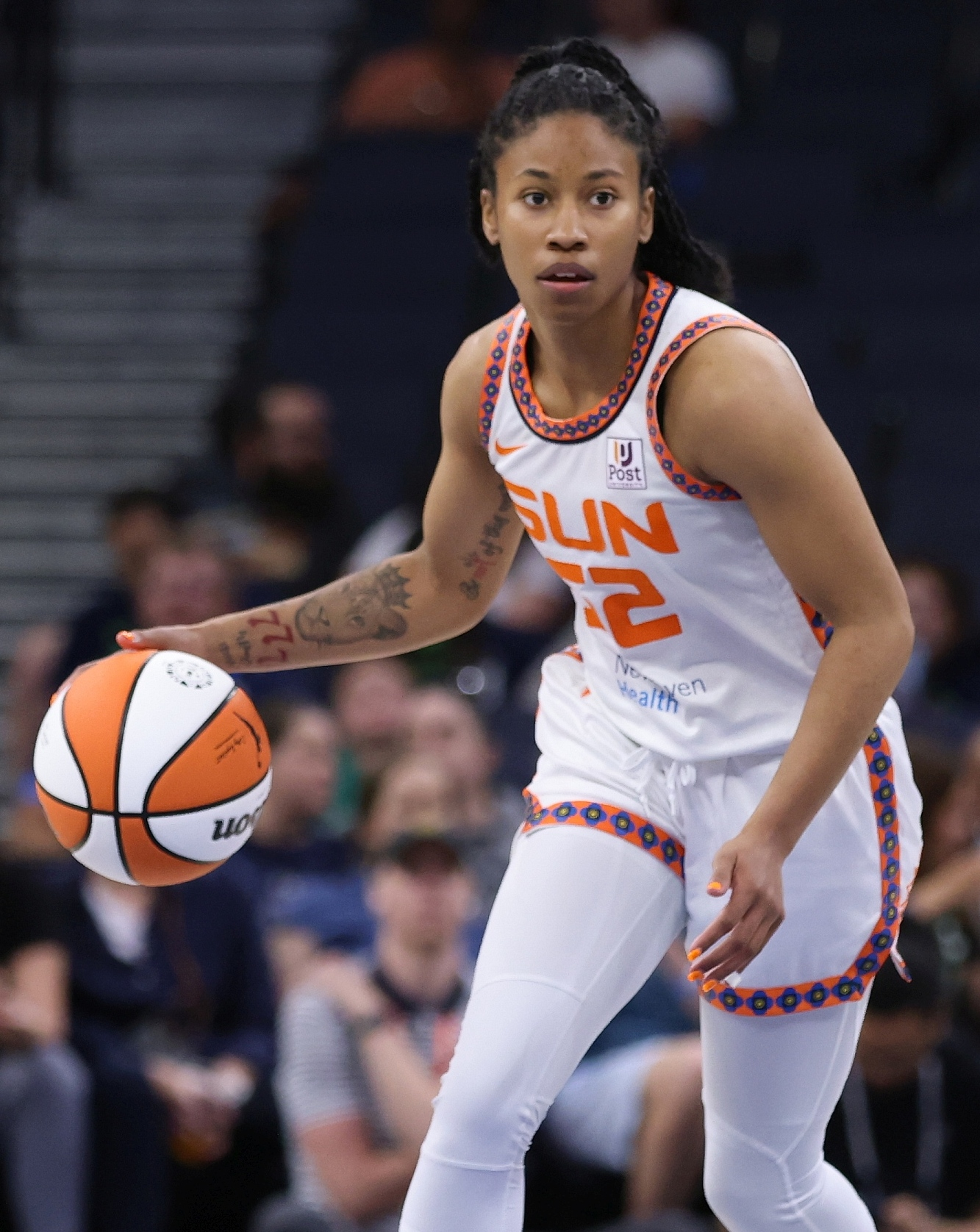
- Harris with the Connecticut Sun in 2023

No. 52 – Indiana Fever
- Position: Point guard
- League: WNBA

Personal information
- Born: May 1, 1998 (age 28) East Lansing, Michigan, U.S.
- Listed height: 5 ft 10 in (1.78 m)
- Listed weight: 164 lb (74 kg)

Career information
- High school: Heritage Christian (Indianapolis, Indiana)
- College: South Carolina (2016–2020)
- WNBA draft: 2020: 1st round, 7th overall pick
- Drafted by: Dallas Wings
- Playing career: 2020–present

Career history
- 2020–2022: Dallas Wings
- 2020–2021: Kayseri Basketbol
- 2021–2022: Nika Siktivkar
- 2022–2023: Cankaya
- 2023–2024: Connecticut Sun
- 2024: Liaoning Flying Eagles
- 2025: Dallas Wings
- 2026–present: Indiana Fever

Career highlights
- Dawn Staley Award (2020); Third-team All-American – AP, USBWA (2020); WBCA Coaches' All-American (2020); SEC Female Athlete of the Year (2020); First-team All-SEC (2020); Second-team All-SEC (2018, 2019); SEC Female Athlete of the Year (2020); NCAA champion (2017); SEC All-Freshman Team (2017)
- Stats at Basketball Reference
Medals
Women's basketball
Representing United States
Pan American Games
Silver medal – second place	2019 Lima	Team
FIBA Under-19 World Cup
Silver medal – second place	2017 Italy	Team
FIBA Under-18 Americas Championship
Gold medal – first place	2016 Chile	Team

Tyasha Pearl Desiree Harris (born May 1, 1998) is an American professional basketball player for the Indiana Fever of the Women's National Basketball Association (WNBA). She played college basketball for the South Carolina Gamecocks. Harris was selected to third team All-American by the Associated Press (AP) and by the U.S. Basketball Writers Association (USBWA) in 2020. She is also the winner of the 2020 Dawn Staley Award, which is named after her coach at South Carolina. On January 31, 2025, it was reported that Harris was traded to the Dallas Wings.

== College career ==
Harris is the first Gamecock to record 700 assists. Her career total of 705 assists ranked 10th all-time in SEC. In June 2020, Harris was named the Southeastern Conference 2019-20 Female Athlete of the Year.

== Professional career ==
=== WNBA ===
==== Dallas Wings (2020–2022) ====
Harris entered the 2020 WNBA draft, where she was selected by the Dallas Wings in the first round as the seventh overall pick in the draft. In her debut game on July 26, 2020, Harris recorded 13 points and 4 assist in a 95 - 105 loss to the Atlanta Dream.

==== Connecticut Sun (2023–2024) ====
In January 2023, the Wings traded Harris to the Connecticut Sun, as part of a three-team deal.

==== Dallas Wings (2025) ====
On January 29, 2025, Harris was reported to have been traded along with Alyssa Thomas to the Phoenix Mercury. On January 31, 2025, it was reported that the Mercury had traded Harris to the Dallas Wings in a three-team deal. Officially, Harris was sent directly from the Sun to the Dallas Wings as part of a larger four-team trade finalized on February 2, 2025. On June 10, 2025, the Wings announced that Harris underwent an unspecified surgery on her left knee and would be out for the remainder of the 2025 season.

=== Overseas ===
Harris signed with the Liaoning Flying Eagles of the Women's Chinese Basketball Association for the 2024–2025 season.

== Career statistics ==
Legend
GP	Games played	GS	Games started	MPG	Minutes per game	RPG	Rebounds per game
APG	Assists per game	SPG	Steals per game	BPG	Blocks per game	PPG	Points per game
TO	Turnovers per game	FG%	Field-goal percentage	3P%	3-point field-goal percentage	FT%	Free-throw percentage
**Bold**	Career best	°	League leader

*	Denotes season(s) in which Harris won an NCAA Championship

=== WNBA ===
==== Regular season ====
WNBA regular season statistics
Year	Team	GP	GS	MPG	FG%	3P%	FT%	RPG	APG	SPG	BPG	TO	PPG
2020	Dallas	21	3	19.6	.433	.339	.636	1.2	2.7	.9	.1	.9	6.8
2021	Dallas	32	3	16.3	.336	.339	.833	1.6	2.7	.4	.3	1.0	4.4
2022	Dallas	35	5	15.8	.416	.309	.792	.9	2.8	.4	.1	1.1	5.0
2023	Connecticut	**40**	0	16.7	.416	**.464**°	.680	.9	1.7	.7	.1	1.0	5.8
2024	Connecticut	39	**38**	**28.8**	.425	.395	.766	**1.8**	**3.1**	**1.0**	.3	1.4	**10.5**
2025	Dallas	5	0	16.4	**.444**	.455	**1.000**	1.0	2.6	.4	**.4**	.6	4.6
2026	Indiana	39	4	13.6	.422	.352	.862	1.1	2.0	.3	.2	**.5**	4.1
**Career**	7 years, 3 teams	211	53	18.5	.412	.380	.770	1.2	2.5	.6	.2	1.0	6.1

==== Playoffs ====
WNBA playoff statistics
Year	Team	GP	GS	MPG	FG%	3P%	FT%	RPG	APG	SPG	BPG	TO	PPG
2021	Dallas	1	0	7.0	.000	.000	—	.0	1.0	.0	.0	**.0**	.0
2022	Dallas	3	0	17.3	.368	.286	**1.000**	**2.3**	2.3	.3	**.3**	1.3	6.0
2023	Connecticut	**7**	0	**21.9**	.462	.542	.800	1.0	**2.4**	**.7**	.0	1.0	**9.3**
2024	Connecticut	5	**3**	16.4	**.500**	**.600**	**1.000**	.8	.2	.2	.0	.6	6.4
2026	Indiana	Did not play (injury)											
**Career**	4 years, 2 teams	16	3	18.4	.438	.500	.909	1.1	1.6	.4	.1	.9	7.2

=== College ===
NCAA statistics
Year	Team	GP	GS	MPG	FG%	3P%	FT%	RPG	APG	SPG	BPG	TO	PPG
2016–17*	South Carolina	**37**	27	26.3	**.429**	.333	.673	2.0	3.2	1.0	.2	**1.6**	5.6
2017–18	South Carolina	36	**35**	**33.6**	.418	.299	.745	3.4	**6.1**	**2.2**	.2	2.6	10.4
2018–19	South Carolina	33	32	31.5	.398	.307	.854	**3.5**	5.3	1.7	.3	1.7	**10.9**
2019–20 (Note: 2020 NCAA tournament cancelled due to COVID-19 pandemic)	South Carolina	33	33	28.7	.426	**.384**	**.857**	**3.5**	5.7	1.6	**.1**	2.1	12.0
**Career**		139	127	30.0	.417	.328	.792	3.1	5.1	1.6	.2	2.0	9.6

== Personal life ==
Tyasha Harris is the daughter of Shannon Greer-Harris and Bruce Harris. She has an older brother, Bruce, and two younger sisters, Talia and Tamara.

She majored in sports and entertainment management at the University of South Carolina.
