= Haley Gorecki =

American basketball player (born 1996)

Personal information
- Born: November 13, 1996 (age 30) Hoffman Estates, Illinois
- Listed height: 6 ft 0 in (1.83 m)

Career information
- High school: William Fremd (Palatine, Illinois)
- College: Duke (2015–2020)
- WNBA draft: 2020: 3rd round, 31st overall pick
- Drafted by: Seattle Storm
- Position: Shooting guard

Career history
- 2020: Casademont Zaragoza
- 2021: Phoenix Mercury
- 2022: CDB Clarinos Tenerife
- 2022–23: VBW Arka Gdynia

Career highlights
- Third-team All-American – USBWA (2020); ACC All-Defensive Team (2020); 2× First-team All-ACC (2019,2020); Illinois Miss Basketball (2015)
- Stats at Basketball Reference
Medals
Women's 3x3 basketball
Representing the United States
FIBA 3x3 AmeriCup
Gold medal – first place	2021 Miami	Team

Haley Marie Gorecki (born November 13, 1996) is an American basketball player who last played for the Phoenix Mercury of the WNBA. She played college basketball for the Duke Blue Devils. Gorecki was selected to third team All-American by the U.S. Basketball Writers Association (USBWA) and All-America Honorable Mention by the Associated Press (AP) in 2020. Coming out of high school, she was Ms. Basketball of Illinois in 2015 as well as the state's Gatorade Player of the Year.

== College career ==
Gorecki appeared in 14 games as a freshman before a right hip injury sidelined her for the rest of the 2015–16 season. She red-shirted in 2016–17 and returned in the 2017–18 season to average 42.3% in 3-point shooting before another injury sidelined her once again after 23 games. Gorecki graduated in 2019 but returned for the 2019–20 season as a graduate student.

== Professional career ==
=== WNBA ===
Gorecki was selected 31st overall by the Seattle Storm in the 2020 WNBA draft. On May 26, she was waived by the Storm.

On February 23, 2021, Gorecki signed a training camp contract with the Storm. She did not make the team and was waived at the end of training camp.

On May 27, 2021, Gorecki was signed to a hardship contract with the Phoenix Mercury. She played three games for them, before being released.

=== Overseas ===
In July 2020, Gorecki signed with Casademont Zaragoza of the Spanish LF Endesa. During the 2020 season with Zaragoza, Gorecki averaged 9.0 points and 4.3 rebounds a game.

In January 2022, Gorecki signed with CDB Clarinos Tenerife of the LF Endesa. In 16 games, she averaged 12.7 points and 3.5 rebounds a game.

Gorecki played for VBW Arka Gdynia of the Polish Basket Liga Kobiet for the 2022–23 season; she averaged 12.3 points and 3.9 rebounds per game.

== WNBA career statistics ==
Legend
GP	Games played	GS	Games started	MPG	Minutes per game	RPG	Rebounds per game
APG	Assists per game	SPG	Steals per game	BPG	Blocks per game	PPG	Points per game
TO	Turnovers per game	FG%	Field-goal percentage	3P%	3-point field-goal percentage	FT%	Free-throw percentage
**Bold**	Career best	°	League leader

=== Regular season ===
Year	Team	GP	GS	MPG	FG%	3P%	FT%	RPG	APG	SPG	BPG	TO	PPG
2021	Phoenix	3	0	2.0	.000	.000	.000	0.7	0.0	0.0	0.0	0.3	0.0
Career	1 years, 1 team	3	0	2.0	.000	.000	.000	0.7	0.0	0.0	0.0	0.3	0.0

== Career statistics ==
Legend
GP	Games played	GS	Games started	MPG	Minutes per game	RPG	Rebounds per game
APG	Assists per game	SPG	Steals per game	BPG	Blocks per game	PPG	Points per game
TO	Turnovers per game	FG%	Field-goal percentage	3P%	3-point field-goal percentage	FT%	Free-throw percentage
**Bold**	Career best	°	League leader

=== College ===
Year	Team	GP	GS	MPG	FG%	3P%	FT%	RPG	APG	SPG	BPG	TO	PPG
2015–16	Duke	14	1	16.2	27.8	22.2	**88.2**	2.6	1.1	1.1	0.1	**1.8**	4.5
2017–18	Duke	23	13	25.0	**42.3**	**42.3**	71.7	3.9	2.9	1.3	0.2	2.1	11.0
2018–19	Duke	**30**	**30**	36.0	36.5	27.9	71.9	**7.1**	3.9	**2.6**	0.3	3.6	17.2
2019–20	Duke	**30**	**30**	**36.5**	39.7	33.7	85.6	6.6	**4.4**	2.1	**0.6**	3.8	**18.5**
Career		97	74	30.7	.381	.323	.788	5.5	3.4	1.9	.3	3.1	14.3

Source: goduke.com

== Personal life ==
Gorecki is the daughter of Adam and Denise Gorecki. She has Polish roots from father side. She has a sister, Brittany, and a brother, Adam. Gorecki holds a degree in Psychology from Duke.
