= Megan Walker =

American basketball player (born 1998)

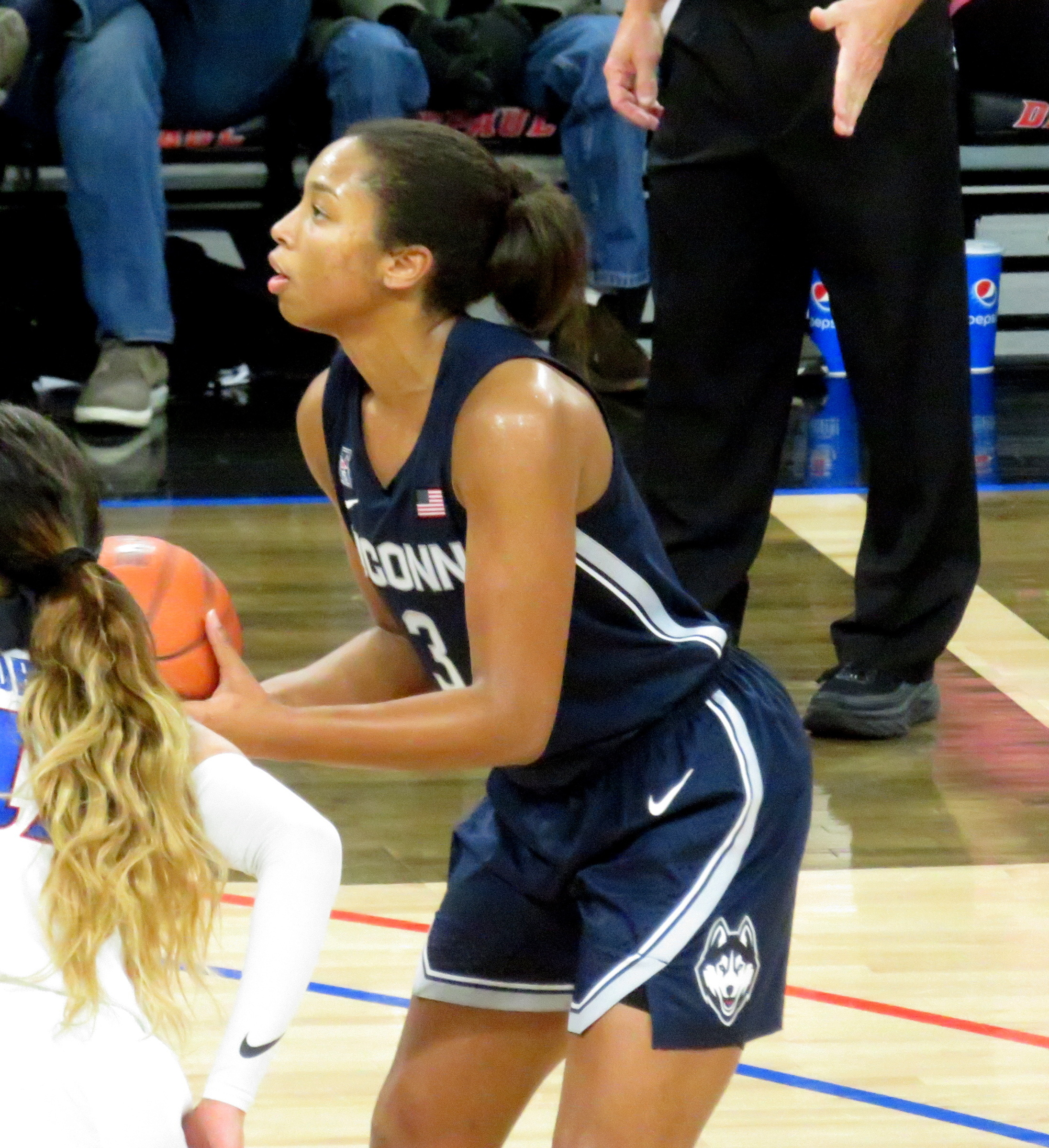
- Walker attempting a free throw for the UConn Huskies in 2020

UMMC Ekaterinburg
- Position: Small forward
- League: Russian Premier League

Personal information
- Born: November 23, 1998 (age 27) Richmond, Virginia, U.S.
- Listed height: 6 ft 1 in (1.85 m)
- Listed weight: 175 lb (79 kg)

Career information
- High school: Monacan (North Chesterfield, Virginia)
- College: UConn (2017–2020)
- WNBA draft: 2020: 1st round, 9th overall pick
- Drafted by: New York Liberty
- Playing career: 2020–present

Career history
- 2020: New York Liberty
- 2021: Phoenix Mercury
- 2022: Atlanta Dream
- 2022–2023: Emlak Konut SK
- 2023–: BC UMMC Ekaterinburg

Career highlights
- First-team All-American – AP, USBWA (2020); WBCA Coaches' All-American (2020); AAC Player of the Year (2020); AAC Tournament MVP (2020); First-team All-AAC (2020); Naismith Prep Player of the Year (2017); McDonald's All-American (2017); Gatorade National Player of the Year (2017); MaxPreps National Player of the Year (2017)
- Stats at Basketball Reference
Medals
Women's basketball
Representing the United States
FIBA Under-19 World Cup
Silver medal – second place	2017 Italy	Team
FIBA Under-18 Americas Championship
Gold medal – first place	2016 Chile	Team
Women's 3x3 basketball
Representing the United States
FIBA 3x3 Under-18 World Cup
Silver medal – second place	2016 Kazakhstan	Team

Megan Kayla Walker (born November 23, 1998) is an American professional basketball player. She played college basketball for the UConn Huskies. Walker was selected to the first team All-American by the Associated Press (AP) and by the U.S. Basketball Writers Association (USBWA) in 2020.

== WNBA career ==
Following the conclusion of the 2019-2020 NCAA season with the UConn Huskies, Walker declared for the 2020 WNBA draft.

=== New York Liberty ===
Walker was drafted 9th overall in the 2020 Draft by the New York Liberty. Due to the COVID-19 Pandemic, Walker's rookie season would be played in Bradenton, Florida in the WNBA Bubble. On July 10, 2020, the Liberty announced that Walker had tested positive for the virus and would miss the start of training camp. Walker made her WNBA debut on July 29, 2020, against the Dallas Wings scoring 2 points in 2 minutes of action. Her highest scoring output for her rookie year came later in the season against the Los Angeles Sparks with 8 points.

On February 10, 2021, the Liberty announced that they had traded Walker, along with Kia Nurse, to the Phoenix Mercury.

=== Phoenix Mercury ===
Walker arrived in Phoenix and started 7 games for the Mercury. She scored in double figures 4 times throughout the year – including her career high of 11 points. As the season continued, Walker began to lose minutes and wasn't playing as much as earlier in the year. Although her minutes were cut, Walker and the Mercury earned a spot in the 2021 WNBA Playoffs and the 2021 WNBA Finals – Walker's first postseason action.

On January 13, 2022, the Mercury waived Walker from their roster.

=== Atlanta Dream ===
After being waived by the Mercury, the Atlanta Dream claimed Walker off of waivers and added her to the roster to earn a spot on their 2022 team. Walker played in 12 games during the 2022 season for the Dream, averaging 3.3 points and 0.8 rebounds. On June 8, 2022, Walker was traded to the New York Liberty, along with the draft rights to Raquel Carrera in exchange for AD. The Liberty waived her following the trade.

== Career statistics ==
Legend
GP	Games played	GS	Games started	MPG	Minutes per game	RPG	Rebounds per game
APG	Assists per game	SPG	Steals per game	BPG	Blocks per game	PPG	Points per game
TO	Turnovers per game	FG%	Field-goal percentage	3P%	3-point field-goal percentage	FT%	Free-throw percentage
**Bold**	Career best	°	League leader

=== WNBA ===
==== Regular season ====
Year	Team	GP	GS	MPG	FG%	3P%	FT%	RPG	APG	SPG	BPG	TO	PPG
2020	New York Liberty	18	0	11.4	.321	.140	.600	**1.5**	0.3	0.2	0.0	**0.4**	3.3
2021	Phoenix Mercury	**29**	**7**	**14.7**	.311	.267	.633	1.3	**0.9**	0.2	**0.3**	0.8	**4.5**
2022	Atlanta Dream	12	0	9.6	**.368**	**.368**	**.667**	0.8	0.4	**0.3**	0.0	1.0	3.3
Career	3 years, 3 teams	59	7	12.6	.322	.241	.634	1.3	0.6	0.2	0.1	0.7	3.9

==== Playoffs ====
Year	Team	GP	GS	MPG	FG%	3P%	FT%	RPG	APG	SPG	BPG	TO	PPG
2021	Phoenix Mercury	5	0	7.8	.286	.000	1.000	0.8	0.0	0.2	0.0	1.2	1.6
Career	1 year, 1 team	5	0	7.8	.286	.000	1.000	0.8	0.0	0.2	0.0	1.2	1.6

=== College ===
Year	Team	GP	GS	MPG	FG%	3P%	FT%	RPG	APG	SPG	BPG	TO	PPG
2017–18	UConn Huskies	32	0	15.5	.444	.371	.755	3.3	0.9	0.3	0.2	**0.9**	5.8
2018–19	UConn Huskies	**36**	**36**	31.3	.458	.397	.742	6.7	1.9	1.0	0.3	2.1	12.1
2019–20*	UConn Huskies	32	32	**33.9**	**.477**	**.451**	**.821**	**8.4**	**2.9**	**1.5**	**0.5**	2.5	**19.7**°
Career		100	68	26.7	.460	.406	.771	6.2	1.9	0.9	0.3	1.8	12.5

* 2020 NCAA tournament cancelled due to COVID-19 pandemic
Source: uconnhuskies.com

=== High school ===
Year	Team	GP	GS	MPG	FG%	3P%	FT%	RPG	APG	SPG	BPG	TO	PPG
2013–14	Monacan HS	22	...	...	.384	**.326**	.644	6.1	1.6	2.8	**1.5**	2.5	19.9
2014–15	Monacan HS	22	...	...	.407	.307	.728	7.1	1.3	2.0	1.3	2.1	19.1
2015–16	Monacan HS	25	...	...	.409	.275	.742	**8.4**	**1.9**	**3.2**	0.7	2.9	21.2
2016–17	Monacan HS	**26**	...	...	**.421**	.292	**.799**	7.6	1.2	**3.2**	1.1	**2.0**	**25.9**
Career		95	...	...	.407	.301	.739	7.4	1.5	2.8	1.1	2.4	21.7

Source: maxprep.com
