= Dawn Staley Award =

Women's college basketball award

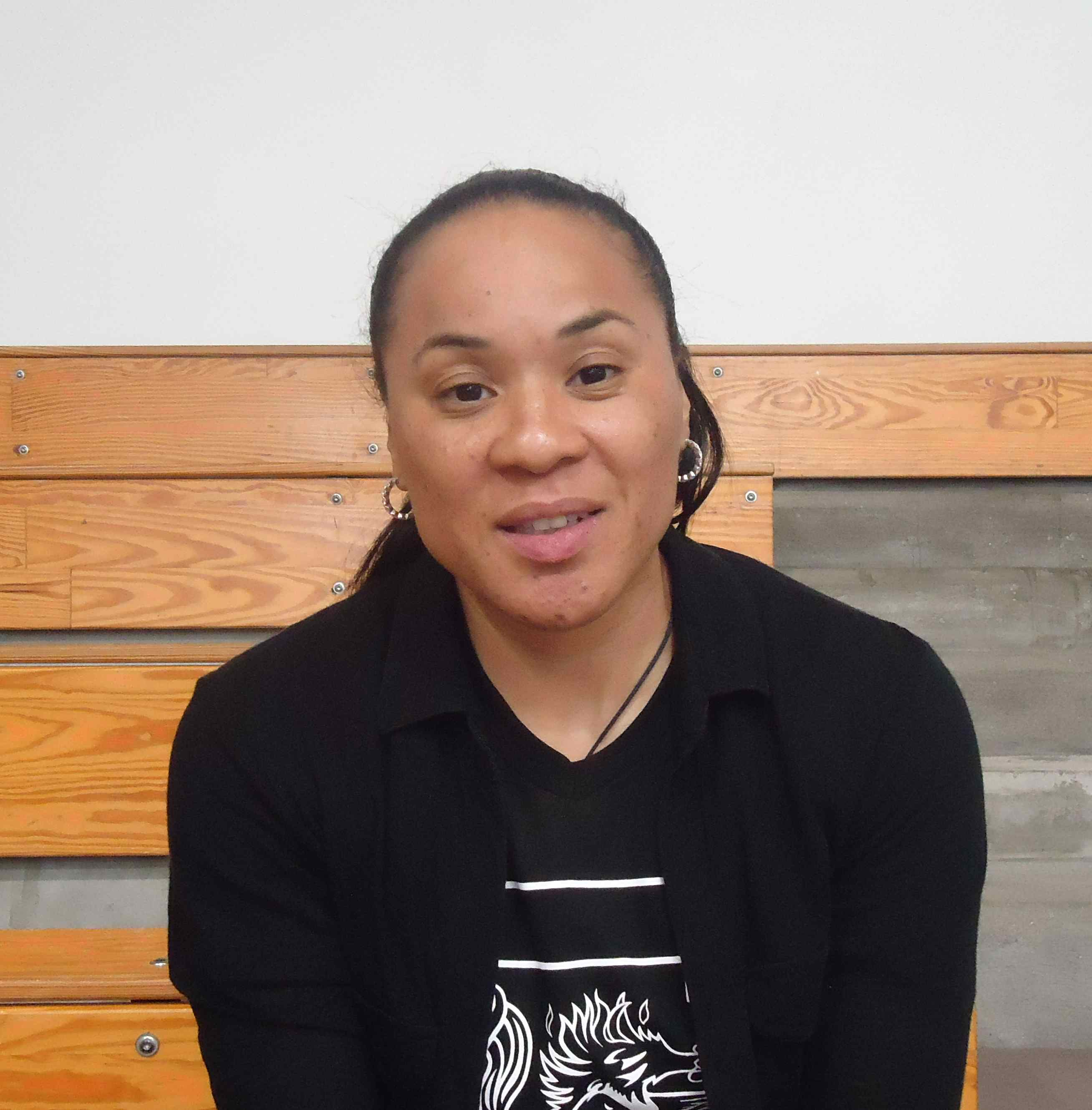
- Dawn Staley
- Awarded for: The nation’s best guard in Women’s Division I college basketball
- Country: United States
- Presented by: Phoenix Club of Philadelphia
- First award: 2013
- Currently held by: Jaloni Cambridge, Ohio State
- Website: Official site

The Dawn Staley Award was established in 2013 to "recognize the nation’s best guard in NCAA Division I women's basketball". It was established by the Phoenix club of Philadelphia, an organization established to recognize the achievements of outstanding male and female basketball players. The award was named after Dawn Staley, a Philadelphia native recognized as one of the nation's best guards in women's college basketball history. The organization establish a watchlist of potential winners during the year and at the end of the season selects the player who "exemplifies the skills that Dawn possessed throughout her career; ball handling, scoring, her ability to distribute the basketball and her will to win".

== Winners ==
Season	Player	School	Class	Ref.
2012–13	Skylar Diggins	Notre Dame	Senior	
2013–14	Odyssey Sims	Baylor	Senior	
2014–15	Tiffany Mitchell	South Carolina	Junior	
2015–16	Moriah Jefferson	UConn	Senior	
2016–17	Kelsey Plum	Washington	Senior	
2017–18	Kelsey Mitchell	Ohio State	Senior	
2018–19	Asia Durr	Louisville	Senior	
2019–20	Tyasha Harris	South Carolina	Senior	
2020–21	Caitlin Clark	Iowa	Freshman	
2021–22	Caitlin Clark (2)	Iowa	Sophomore	
2022–23	Caitlin Clark (3)	Iowa	Junior	
2023–24	Hannah Hidalgo	Notre Dame	Freshman	
2024–25	JuJu Watkins	USC	Sophomore	
2025–26	Jaloni Cambridge	Ohio State	Sophomore	

== See also ==
- List of sports awards honoring women
