= Kathleen Doyle =

American basketball player (born 1998)

DePaul Blue Demons
- Title: Assistant coach
- League: Big East Conference

Personal information
- Born: June 11, 1998 (age 28) Chicago, Illinois, U.S.
- Listed height: 5 ft 9 in (1.75 m)

Career information
- High school: Benet Academy (Lisle, Illinois)
- College: Iowa (2016–2020)
- WNBA draft: 2020: 2nd round, 14th overall pick
- Drafted by: Indiana Fever
- Playing career: 2020–2020
- Position: Point guard
- Number: 11
- Coaching career: 2025–present

Career history

Playing
- 2020: Indiana Fever

Coaching
- 2025–present: DePaul (assistant)

Career highlights
- Third-team All-American – AP, USBWA (2020); WBCA Coaches' All-American (2020); Big Ten Player of the Year (2020); 2× First-team All-Big Ten (2019, 2020); Big Ten All-Freshman Team (2017); Illinois Miss Basketball (2016)
- Stats at Basketball Reference
Medals
Women's basketball
Representing United States
Pan American Games
Silver medal – second place	2019 Lima	Team

Kathleen Mae Doyle (born June 11, 1998) is an American former professional basketball player and current coach. She previously played in the Women's National Basketball Association (WNBA), and presently serves as the assistant coach and recruiting coordinator for the DePaul University women's basketball team.

She played college basketball for the Iowa Hawkeyes. After a successful college career with Iowa, Doyle was drafted by the Indiana Fever with the 14th overall pick in the 2nd round of the 2020 WNBA draft. She subsequently played for the Fever in the COVID-shortened 2020 season.

== Playing career ==
Growing up in the Chicago suburb of La Grange Park, Illinois, she attended Benet Academy in another suburb, Lisle, where she led the Redwings to state championships in her final two seasons in 2015 and 2016. In 2024, Doyle became the first female athlete to have her number retired by the school.

A member of the All-Big Ten freshman team in 2017, and a three-time All-Big Ten selection (second team by coaches in 2018, first team by coaches and second team by media in 2019, and first team by both in 2020), she was named Big Ten Player of the Year in her senior (final) season in 2020. During her time at Iowa, Doyle also represented the US at the 2019 Pan American Games, winning a silver medal with Team USA.

Doyle played one season for the Fever and two more in Poland and Turkey. She retired from professional basketball in 2023.

== Coaching career ==
On April 29, 2025 Doyle was announced to start in the 2025–26 season as the assistant coach and recruiting coordinator under head women's basketball coach Jill Pizzotti, marking Doyle's first season as a collegiate basketball coach.

== Career statistics ==
Legend
GP	Games played	GS	Games started	MPG	Minutes per game	RPG	Rebounds per game
APG	Assists per game	SPG	Steals per game	BPG	Blocks per game	PPG	Points per game
TO	Turnovers per game	FG%	Field-goal percentage	3P%	3-point field-goal percentage	FT%	Free-throw percentage
**Bold**	Career best	°	League leader

=== College ===
Ratios
Year	Team	GP	FG%	3P%	FT%	RBG	APG	BPG	SPG	PPG
2016–17	Iowa	**34**	39.1%	23.4%	70.1%	2.65	4.35	0.38	2.09	9.21
2017–18	Iowa	30	37.8%	**34.7%**	68.4%	3.73	**6.63**	**0.67**	1.53	11.07
2018–19	Iowa	29	39.6%	30.5%	74.4%	3.00	5.86	0.38	**2.28**	12.00
2019–20	Iowa	30	**44.1%**	32.7%	**79.0%**	**4.63**	6.30	0.27	1.83	**18.13**
Career		123	40.5%	30.5%	74.2%	3.48	5.74	0.42	1.93	12.50

Totals
Year	Team	GP	FG	FGA	3P	3PA	FT	FTA	REB	A	BK	ST	PTS
2016-17	Iowa	**34**	115	294	22	94	61	87	90	148	13	**71**	313
2017-18	Iowa	30	116	307	33	95	67	98	112	**199**	**20**	46	332
2018-19	Iowa	29	124	313	36	**118**	64	86	87	170	11	66	348
2019-20	Iowa	30	**180**	**408**	**37**	113	**147**	**186**	**139**	189	8	55	**544**
Career		123	535	1322	128	420	339	457	428	706	52	238	1537

=== WNBA ===
Year	Team	GP	GS	MPG	FG%	3P%	FT%	RPG	APG	SPG	BPG	TO	PPG
2020	Indiana	18	0	8.6	.244	.238	.500	.8	1.1	.4	.0	1.0	1.5
