= Jaylyn Agnew =

American basketball player (born 1997)

Creighton Bluejays
- Position: Assistant coach
- League: Big East Conference

Personal information
- Born: July 21, 1997 (age 29)
- Listed height: 5 ft 11 in (1.80 m)
- Listed weight: 149 lb (68 kg)

Career information
- High school: Andover (Andover, Kansas)
- College: Creighton (2016–2020)
- WNBA draft: 2020: 2nd round, 24th overall pick
- Drafted by: Washington Mystics
- Playing career: 2020–2023
- Coaching career: 2023–present

Career history

Playing
- 2020–2021: Atlanta Dream
- 2020: WBC Sparta&K

Coaching
- 2023–present: Creighton (assistant)

Career highlights
- Big East Player of the Year (2020); First-team All-Big East (2020); Big East Freshman of the Year (2017); Big East All-Freshman Team (2017)
- Stats at Basketball Reference

Jaylyn Agnew (born July 21, 1997) is an American former professional basketball player who is currently an assistant coach for the Creighton Bluejays. She played college basketball for the Creighton Bluejays.

== Early life ==
Agnew played high school basketball for Andover High School. In her sophomore season, she averaged 13.3 points per game and shot 53 percent from the field. In her junior year, she averaged 14.3 points per game and led her team to a 17–6 record. In her senior year, she averaged 17.4 points per game and she was a three-time conference MVP for her high school.

== College career ==
Agnew played college basketball for the Creighton Bluejays from 2016 to 2020. In her freshman season, she averaged 7.1 points, 3.5 rebounds and 1.5 assists per game and was named Big East Freshman of the Year. In her sophomore season, she averaged 14.5 points, 6.3 rebounds and 2.6 assists per game. In her junior year, she averaged 11.8 points, 6.6 rebounds and 3.2 assists per game. In her senior year, she averaged 20.8 points, 6.3 rebounds and 3.3 assists per game and she was named the Big East Player of the Year. She went on to become Creighton's first WNBA draft pick.

=== Creighton statistics ===
Ratios
Year	Team	GP	FG%	3P%	FT%	RBG	APG	BPG	SPG	PPG
2015-16	Creighton	Non medical redshirt								
2016-17	Creighton	32	43.1%	37.8%	77.4%	3.50	1.47	0.66	0.94	7.13
2017-18	Creighton	32	44.3%	40.3%	81.8%	6.31	2.63	1.28	1.03	14.50
2018-19	Creighton	27	43.0%	34.2%	76.2%	6.59	3.19	1.11	0.59	11.82
2019-20	Creighton	26	44.0%	37.4%	95.0%	6.35	3.27	1.00	1.15	20.81
Career		117	43.7%	37.6%	84.8%	5.62	2.58	1.01	0.93	13.26

Totals
Year	Team	GP	FG	FGA	3P	3PA	FT	FTA	REB	A	BK	ST	PTS
2015-16	Creighton	Non medical redshirt											
2016-17	Creighton	32	85	197	34	90	24	31	112	47	21	30	228
2017-18	Creighton	32	160	361	81	201	63	77	202	84	41	33	464
2018-19	Creighton	27	117	272	53	155	32	42	178	86	30	16	319
2019-20	Creighton	26	190	432	85	227	76	80	165	85	26	30	541
Career		117	552	1262	253	673	195	230	657	302	118	109	1552

== Professional career ==
On April 17, 2020, the Washington Mystics selected Agnew as the 24th pick in the 2020 WNBA draft. After being waived by the Mystics to finalize rosters, Agnew was signed by the Dream in June 2020.

In 2020, she signed with Spartak Vidnoye Moscow Region (aka WBC Sparta&K)

== Coaching career ==
Agnew returned to Creighton as an assistant coach, beginning with the 2023–24 season.

== WNBA career statistics ==
Legend
GP	Games played	GS	Games started	MPG	Minutes per game	RPG	Rebounds per game
APG	Assists per game	SPG	Steals per game	BPG	Blocks per game	PPG	Points per game
TO	Turnovers per game	FG%	Field-goal percentage	3P%	3-point field-goal percentage	FT%	Free-throw percentage
**Bold**	Career best	°	League leader

=== Regular season ===
Year	Team	GP	GS	MPG	FG%	3P%	FT%	RPG	APG	SPG	BPG	TO	PPG
2020	Atlanta	12	0	5.9	.267	.231	.800	0.4	0.3	0.0	0.0	0.4	1.3
Career	1 year, 1 team	12	0	5.9	.267	.231	.800	0.4	0.3	0.0	0.0	0.4	1.3
