= Erica Ogwumike =

Nigerian-American professional basketball player

Personal information
- Born: September 26, 1997 (age 29) Cypress, Texas, U.S.
- Listed height: 5 ft 9 in (1.75 m)

Career information
- High school: Cypress Woods (Cypress, Texas)
- College: Pepperdine (2015–2016); Rice (2016–2020)
- WNBA draft: 2020: 3rd round, 26th overall pick
- Drafted by: New York Liberty
- Playing career: 2020–present
- Position: Point guard
- Stats at Basketball Reference

Erica Erinma Ogwumike (born September 26, 1997) is a Nigerian American basketball player. She played college basketball for the Rice Owls.

In July 2020, she announced her decision to play for the Nigeria women's national basketball team in the Tokyo Olympics. Aside from athletics, Ogwumike is also an aspiring doctor and is currently in medical school.

== High school career ==
Ogwumike played High school basketball for Cypress Woods High School; she holds the records for most career points for Cypress Woods High School as she scored 2,227 career points, 1,141 rebounds and 440 steals; in all 143 games, she played for the school.

== College career ==
Ogwumike started her college career with the Pepperdine Waves women's basketball team, where she averaged 18.4 points, 7.5 rebounds and 2.3 assists per game in her freshman season. She transferred to Rice University in 2016, where she couldn't play the 2016–17 season for the Rice Owls women's basketball team due to transfer rules. In her sophomore season in 2017, she averaged 17.9 points, 9.3 rebounds and 1.9 assists per game. In her junior year, she averaged 16.5 points, 10.5 rebounds and 2.7 assists. She played her senior year as a graduate student; she averaged 19 points, 10.3 rebounds and 2.7 assists.

== Professional career ==
=== WNBA ===
On April 17, 2020, the New York Liberty selected Ogwumike as the 26th pick in the 2020 WNBA draft. Later that night, she was traded to the Minnesota Lynx. She was waived by the Minnesota Lynx alongside Linnae Harper days after the draft.

== National Team Career ==
Erica was called up and participated at the Nigeria women's national basketball team 10-day training camp for the 2020 Tokyo Olympic games in Atlanta by the team coach Otis Hughley Jr. She participated in the basketball event at the 2020 Summer Olympics where she averaged 1 rebound, and 1 assist.

== Career statistics ==
Legend
GP	Games played	GS	Games started	MPG	Minutes per game	RPG	Rebounds per game
APG	Assists per game	SPG	Steals per game	BPG	Blocks per game	PPG	Points per game
TO	Turnovers per game	FG%	Field-goal percentage	3P%	3-point field-goal percentage	FT%	Free-throw percentage
**Bold**	Career best	°	League leader

=== College ===
Year	Team	GP	GS	MPG	FG%	3P%	FT%	RPG	APG	SPG	BPG	TO	PPG
2015–16	Pepperdine	26	26	**33.6**	41.8	30.8	72.6	7.5	2.3	**2.0**	0.5	3.5	18.4
2016–17	Rice	Did not play due to injury											
2017–18	Rice	**32**	**32**	32.8	**47.4**	**37.8**	79.1	9.3	1.9	1.9	0.4	2.8	17.9
2018–19	Rice	31	31	32.4	46.3	29.8	**84.5**	**10.5**	**2.7**	1.6	0.3	2.9	16.5
2019–20	Rice	27	27	31.5	45.8	17.2	81.0	10.3	**2.7**	1.0	**0.7**	**2.7**	**19.0**
**Career**		116	116	32.6	45.3	30.0	79.3	9.5	2.4	1.6	0.5	3.0	17.9
Statistics retrieved from Sports-Reference.

== Personal life ==
Ogwumike was born in Cypress, Texas. She has three older sisters who also play basketball—Nneka of the Los Angeles Sparks, Chiney, formerly of the Los Angeles Sparks, and Olivia of the Rice University Owls. She attended University of Texas Southwestern Medical School and is currently a dermatologist.

She is Catholic.
