= 2020 WNBA Finals =

Championship series of the 2020 WNBA season

Team	Coach	Wins
Seattle Storm	Gary Kloppenburg	3
Las Vegas Aces	Bill Laimbeer	0
- Dates: October 2 – 6
- MVP: Breanna Stewart
- Hall of Famers: Storm: Sue Bird (2025)
- Eastern finals: Las Vegas Aces defeated Connecticut Sun 3–2 (Note: the semifinal rounds as of 2016 were not divided by conference)
- Western finals: Seattle Storm defeated Minnesota Lynx 3–0

The 2020 WNBA Finals (branded as the WNBA Finals 2020 presented by YouTube TV for sponsorship reasons) was the best-of-five championship series for the 2020 season of the Women's National Basketball Association (WNBA). The Finals feature the top seeded Las Vegas Aces facing off against the second seed Seattle Storm. Despite losing both regular season meetings against Las Vegas, the Storm dominated the series, sweeping the Aces in three straight games. Led by Finals MVP Breanna Stewart, Seattle won all three games by double-digits, claiming their second title in three years and fourth in franchise history.

== Road to the Finals ==
=== Changes due to COVID-19 ===
The Finals were less affected than the regular season for the WNBA. Format and seeding remained the same as it has in recent years. However, the teams continued to play at the IMG Academy in Bradenton, Florida, thereby eliminating any home court advantages teams might have had in a normal playoffs. Dates for the playoffs remained largely the same as a normal season. No fans were allowed in the arena during the playoffs.

=== Standings ===
#	Team	W	L	PCT	GB	Conf.
1	**x** – Las Vegas Aces	18	4	.818	–	8–2
2	**x** – Seattle Storm	18	4	.818	–	8–2
3	**x** – Los Angeles Sparks	15	7	.682	3	5–5
4	**x** – Minnesota Lynx	14	8	.636	4	4–6
5	**x** – Phoenix Mercury	13	9	.591	5	4–6
6	**x** – Chicago Sky	12	10	.545	6	6–4
7	**x** – Connecticut Sun	10	12	.455	8	7–3
8	**x** – Washington Mystics	9	13	.409	9	6–4
9	**e** – Dallas Wings	8	14	.364	10	1–9
10	**e** – Atlanta Dream	7	15	.318	11	5–5
11	**e** – Indiana Fever	6	16	.273	12	4–6
12	**e** – New York Liberty	2	20	.091	16	2–8

Notes

x – Clinched playoff berth
e – Eliminated from playoffs
Home and Away records not shown, as all games played at a neutral location.
Updated to include results from September 13, 2020

=== Playoffs ===
**First round** Single elimination (September 15)
5	**Phoenix Mercury**	**85**
8	Washington Mystics	84
6	Chicago Sky	81
7	**Connecticut Sun**	**94**

**Second round** Single elimination (September 17)
4	**Minnesota Lynx**	**80**
5	Phoenix Mercury	79
3	Los Angeles Sparks	59
7	**Connecticut Sun**	**73**

**Semifinals**; Best-of-5 (September 20–29)
1	**Las Vegas Aces**	**3**
7	Connecticut Sun	2
2	**Seattle Storm**	**3**
4	Minnesota Lynx	0

**WNBA Finals**; Best-of-5 (October 2–11)
1	Las Vegas Aces	0
2	**Seattle Storm**	**3**

Note: Teams re-seeded after each round.

- **Bold** – Game or series winner

== Summary ==
This finals was the fourth time in the five years since the WNBA switched playoff formats in 2016 that two teams from the same conference met in the WNBA Finals. In 2016 and 2017, two teams from the Western Conference met and in 2019 two teams from the Eastern Conference met. This Finals is also the fourth time that the top two seeds have made it to the finals since the WNBA switched playoff formats in 2016. The lone non-top two seed to make the finals was the third seeded Washington Mystics in 2018.

The Las Vegas Aces qualified for the finals after finishing first in the regular season standings, which earned them a double-bye into the semifinals. In the semifinals, they defeated the Connecticut Sun in five games.

The Seattle Storm qualified for the finals after finishing second in the regular season standings, which earned them a double-bye into the semifinals. In the semifinals, they defeated the Minnesota Lynx in a three-game sweep.

The Aces won the regular season series 2–0.

=== Game 1 ===
Game one started tense, with the first quarter finishing 23–21 in favor of the Storm. The Storm extended their lead via a big second quarter, which they won by fifteen points. Seattle took an eighteen point lead into halftime. The Aces came out of halftime strong, winning the third quarter by fifteen points and cut the overall lead to three. However, the Storm won the fourth quarter by eleven points to take the game by thirteen overall. They take a one game lead in the best-of-five series.

The Storm were led by Breanna Stewart who recorded thirty seven points and fifteen rebounds. Jewell Loyd also contributed 28 points. Sue Bird set a WNBA Finals single game record for assists in a game with sixteen. The Storm's bench contributed fifteen total points. The Aces were led by Angel McCoughtry with twenty points. A'ja Wilson added nineteen and three other players scored in double digits. The Aces' bench scored sixteen points.

ESPN2, TSN1/4/5

October 2
7:00pm ET

Report

Las Vegas Aces 80, Seattle Storm 93
Scoring by quarter: 21–23, 19–34, 27–12, 13–24
Pts: Angel McCoughtry 20; Rebs: Carolyn Swords 12; Asts: McBride, Young 4 each	Pts: Breanna Stewart 37; Rebs: Breanna Stewart 15; Asts: Sue Bird 16
Seattle lead series, 1-0

IMG Academy
Attendance: No in-person attendance
Referees: Eric Brewton, Billy Smith, Cheryl Flores, Isaac Barnett

=== Game 2 ===
Game two started with the Storm winning the first quarter by seven points. The Aces made a small comeback and won the second quarter by one point. Therefore, the Storm took a lead of six points into half time. The Storm won the third quarter by a point and the fourth quarter by six points to win the game by thirteen points overall. The Storm won the first two games by the same thirteen point margin to take a 2–0 lead in the series.

Five Storm players scored in double digits, including three who scored at least twenty points. Breanna Stewart was the leading scorer with twenty-two points, and she was closely followed by Alysha Clark and Natasha Howard, who both scored twenty-one. Jordin Canada also added ten from the bench. Sue Bird recorded back-to-back double digit assist games, with sixteen in Game one and ten in this game. The Aces had four total players score in double digits. They were led by A'ja Wilson with twenty and both Angel McCoughtry and Emma Cannon scored seventeen.

ABC, SN

October 4
3:00pm ET

Report

Las Vegas Aces 91, Seattle Storm 104
Scoring by quarter: 24–31, 18–17, 26–27, 23–29
Pts: A'ja Wilson 20; Rebs: Angel McCoughtry 8 Asts: Danielle Robinson 10	Pts: Breanna Stewart 22; Rebs: Natasha Howard 8 Asts: Sue Bird 10
Seattle lead series, 2-0

IMG Academy
Attendance: No in-person attendance
Referees: Maj Forsberg, Byron Jarrett, Tiara Cruse, Isaac Barnett

=== Game 3 ===
Similar to the first two games, game three started off close, with Seattle clinging to a 23-21 lead at the end of the first quarter. However, the Storm dominated the rest of the way, outscoring the Aces 69-38 through the remaining 30 minutes. The 33 point margin of victory was by far the most lopsided of the series after Seattle had won the first two games by 13 points each.

WNBA Finals MVP Breanna Stewart fittingly lead the Storm in points once again with 26. Jewell Loyd added 19 points and a team-high 9 rebounds while Jordin Canada managed 15 points off the bench. Alysha Clark and Natasha Howard each pulled down seven rebounds and combined for 15 points. Sue Bird added seven assists on the way to her fourth WNBA title, all with the Storm. A'ja Wilson led the Aces in scoring and passing with 18 points and four assists. Jackie Young added 11 points for Las Vegas while Carolyn Swords led the Aces in rebounds with 10.

ESPN, TSN3/5

October 6
7:00pm ET

Report

Las Vegas Aces 59, Seattle Storm 92
Scoring by quarter: 21–23, 13–20, 14–32, 11–17
Pts: A'ja Wilson 18; Rebs: Carolyn Swords 10; Asts: A'ja Wilson 4	Pts: Breanna Stewart 26; Rebs: Jewell Loyd 9 Asts: Sue Bird 7
Seattle wins WNBA Finals, 3-0

IMG Academy
Attendance: No in-person attendance
Referees: Michael Price, Eric Brewton, Cheryl Flores, Isaac Barnett

== Team rosters ==
2020 Las Vegas Aces roster
Players
Coaches

Pos.	No.	Nat.	Name	Height	Weight	DOB	From	Yrs
G	15	(United States)	Allen, Lindsay	5' 8" (1.73m)	189 lb (86kg)	1995-03-20	Notre Dame	2
F	11	(United States)	Burdick, Cierra	6' 2" (1.88m)	172 lb (78kg)	1993-09-30	Tennessee	3
C	8	(Australia)	Cambage, Liz	6' 8" (2.03m)	216 lb (98kg)	1991-08-18	Australia	4
F	32	(United States)	Cannon, Emma	6' 2" (1.88m)	190 lb (86kg)	1989-06-01	Florida Southern	1
F	5	(United States)	Hamby, Dearica	6' 3" (1.91m)	189 lb (86kg)	1993-11-06	Wake Forest	5
G	21	(United States)	McBride, Kayla	5' 10" (1.78m)	174 lb (79kg)	1992-06-25	Notre Dame	6
G/F	35	(United States)	McCoughtry, Angel	6' 1" (1.85m)	173 lb (78kg)	1986-09-10	Louisville	10
G	10	(United States)	Plum, Kelsey	5' 8" (1.73m)	145 lb (66kg)	1994-08-24	Washington	3
G	3	(United States)	Robinson, Danielle	5' 9" (1.75m)	137 lb (62kg)	1989-05-10	Oklahoma	8
G	14	(United States)	Rodgers, Sugar	5' 9" (1.75m)	137 lb (62kg)	1989-12-08	Georgetown	7
C	4	(United States)	Swords, Carolyn	6' 6" (1.98m)	215 lb (98kg)	1989-07-19	Boston College	8
F	22	(United States)	Wilson, A'ja	6' 4" (1.93m)	195 lb (88kg)	1996-08-08	South Carolina	2
G	0	(United States)	Young, Jackie	6' 0" (1.83m)	165 lb (75kg)	1997-09-16	Notre Dame	1

Head coach
(United States) Bill Laimbeer (Notre Dame)
Assistant coaches
(United States) Vickie Johnson (Louisiana Tech)
(United States) Tanisha Wright (Penn State)

Legend

- (C) Team captain
- (DP) Unsigned draft pick
- (FA) Free agent
- (S) Suspended
- Injured

2020 Seattle Storm roster
Players
Coaches

Pos.	No.	Nat.	Name	Height	Weight	DOB	From	Yrs
G	10	(United States)	Bird, Sue	5' 9" (1.75m)	150 lb (68kg)	1980-10-16	Connecticut	16
G	21	(United States)	Canada, Jordin	5' 6" (1.68m)	135 lb (61kg)	1995-08-11	UCLA	2
F	32	(Israel)	Clark, Alysha	5' 11" (1.8m)	167 lb (76kg)	1987-07-07	Middle Tennessee	8
F	6	(United States)	Howard, Natasha	6' 2" (1.88m)	165 lb (75kg)	1991-09-02	Florida State	6
F/C	1	(United States)	Langhorne, Crystal	6' 2" (1.88m)	185 lb (84kg)	1986-10-27	Maryland	12
G	24	(United States)	Loyd, Jewell	5' 10" (1.78m)	148 lb (67kg)	1993-10-05	Notre Dame	5
F	0	(Australia)	Magbegor, Eziyoda	6' 4" (1.93m)	176 lb (80kg)	1999-08-13	Australia	R
G	11	(Russia)	Prince, Epiphanny	5' 9" (1.75m)	179 lb (81kg)	1988-01-11	Rutgers	10
C	2	(United States)	Russell, Mercedes	6' 6" (1.98m)	195 lb (88kg)	1995-07-27	Tennessee	2
F	30	(United States)	Stewart, Breanna	6' 4" (1.93m)	170 lb (77kg)	1994-08-27	Connecticut	3
F	3	(United States)	Tuck, Morgan	6' 2" (1.88m)	207 lb (94kg)	1994-04-30	Connecticut	4
G	33	(Australia)	Whitcomb, Sami	5' 10" (1.78m)	145 lb (66kg)	1988-07-20	Washington	3

Head coach
(United States) Gary Kloppenburg (UC San Diego)
Assistant coaches
(United States) Noelle Quinn (UCLA)
(United States) Ryan Webb (Seattle)

Legend

- (C) Team captain
- (DP) Unsigned draft pick
- (FA) Free agent
- (S) Suspended
- Injured
