= 2020 Chicago Sky season =

- Head coach: James Wade
- Arena: Originally: Wintrust Arena; Rescheduled to: IMG Academy gymnasiums, Bradenton, Florida

Results
- Record: 12–10 (.545)
- Place: 1st (Eastern)
- Playoff finish: 6th seed, Lost to Connecticut Sun in First Round

The 2020 Chicago Sky season was the franchise's 15th season in the Women's National Basketball Association (WNBA). This was the second season under head coach James Wade. The Sky did not improve on their previous season's record of 20–14, but entered the playoffs for the second consecutive season.

The season was initially scheduled to feature an all-time high 36 regular-season games, tipping off at the Sky's home Wintrust Arena on May 15, 2020. However, this plan was halted on April 3, when the WNBA postponed its season due to the COVID-19 pandemic. Under a plan approved on June 15, the league has been holding a shortened 22-game regular season at IMG Academy, without fans present, since July 24. Under this plan, the Sky's first game was on July 26, versus the Las Vegas Aces.

The Sky started out the season with success, posting a 10–4 record through 14 games. However, they lost 6 of their last 8 games to finish the season with a 12–10 record. They entered the playoffs as the 6th seed, losing to the 7th-seeded Connecticut Sun. In the offseason, the team added Azurá Stevens and Sydney Colson while losing Katie Lou Samuelson. During the season, they traded away Jantel Lavender and acquired Stephanie Mavunga. They also experienced a number of injuries throughout the season, ending the season without key players including Stevens and Diamond DeShields.

Starting guard Courtney Vandersloot set the all-time WNBA record for assists per game with 10, breaking her own record of 9.1 set in the 2019 season.

== Transactions ==
=== WNBA draft ===
The Sky will make the following selections in the 2020 WNBA draft.

Round	Pick	Player	Nationality	School/Team/Country
1	8	Ruthy Hebard	United States	Oregon
3	30	Japreece Dean	United States	UCLA
3	32	Kiah Gillespie	United States	Florida State

=== Trades and Roster Changes ===
Date	Trade or Roster Change
February 12, 2020	Acquired a first-round pick in the 2021 WNBA draft in exchange for C Astou Ndour
February 13, 2020	Signed G Sydney Colson
February 14, 2020	Acquired F Azurá Stevens in exchange for F Katie Lou Samuelson and a first-round pick in the 2021 WNBA draft
February 15, 2020	Re-Signed G Kahleah Copper
February 17, 2020	Re-Signed F/C Stefanie Dolson
February 19, 2020	Re-Signed G Allie Quigley
February 25, 2020	Re-Signed G Courtney Vandersloot
June 29, 2020	Signed G Stella Johnson
August 28, 2020	Acquired F Stephanie Mavunga in exchange for C Jantel Lavender and second and third round picks in the 2021 WNBA draft
August 31, 2020	Signed F Alisia Jenkins

== Roster ==
2020 Chicago Sky roster
Players
Coaches

Pos.	No.	Nat.	Name	Height	Weight	DOB	From	Yrs
G	51	(United States)	Colson, Sydney	5' 8" (1.73m)	140 lb (64kg)	1989-08-06	Texas A&M	6
G/F	2	(United States)	Copper, Kahleah	6' 1" (1.85m)	155 lb (70kg)	1994-08-28	Rutgers	4
G	1	(United States)	DeShields, Diamond	6' 1" (1.85m)	163 lb (74kg)	1995-03-05	Tennessee	2
C	31	(United States)	Dolson, Stefanie	6' 5" (1.96m)	231 lb (105kg)	1992-01-08	Connecticut	6
F	24	(United States)	Hebard, Ruthy	6' 4" (1.93m)		1998-04-28	Oregon	R
F	23	(United States)	Mavunga, Stephanie	6' 3" (1.91m)	205 lb (93kg)	1995-02-24	Ohio State	2
F	32	(United States)	Parker, Cheyenne	6' 4" (1.93m)	193 lb (88kg)	1992-08-22	Middle Tennessee	5
F	15	(United States)	Prince, Alexis	6' 2" (1.88m)	178 lb (81kg)	1994-02-05	Baylor	2
G	14	(Hungary)	Quigley, Allie	5' 10" (1.78m)	140 lb (64kg)	1986-06-20	DePaul	11
F/C	30	(United States)	Stevens, Azurá	6' 6" (1.98m)	180 lb (82kg)	1996-02-01	Connecticut	2
G	22	(Hungary)	Vandersloot, Courtney	5' 8" (1.73m)	145 lb (66kg)	1989-02-08	Gonzaga	9
F	15	(United States)	Williams, Gabby	5' 11" (1.8m)	172 lb (78kg)	1996-09-09	Connecticut	2

Head coach
(United States) James Wade (Kennesaw State)
Assistant coaches
(Germany) Olaf Lange
(Turkey) Emre Vatansever
Athletic trainer
(United States) Meghan Lockerby
Strength and conditioning coach
(United States) Ann Crosby (Western Michigan)

Legend

- (C) Team captain
- (DP) Unsigned draft pick
- (FA) Free agent
- (S) Suspended
- Injured

== Season overview ==
The Sky entered the 2020 season looking to build on dramatic improvements in the previous season, when they reached the playoffs for the first time in three years and were recognized with three All-Star selections and a Coach of the Year Award.

During the free agency period, the Sky made few changes to their roster from the previous year. The team traded away Astou Ndour and 2019 first-round pick Katie Lou Samuelson, acquired third-year player Azurá Stevens via trade, and signed veteran Sydney Colson. Free agents Allie Quigley, Courtney Vandersloot, and Stefanie Dolson were all re-signed to multi-year deals. Amid many All-Star players in the league changing teams, the Sky's decision to largely bring back the previous year's team received a grade of B− from SB Nation. On the other hand, women's basketball website Swish Appeal evaluated the Sky's decisions more positively and argued that the team positioned itself to contend for a championship. The WNBA-focused publication Winsidr gave the Sky a B+, rating the retentions of key players and addition of Sydney Colson highly, but criticizing the value of the trade for Stevens.

In the 2020 draft, the Sky selected Ruthy Hebard in the first round and Japreece Dean and Kiah Gillespie in the third round. The Sky received a grade of B in three post-draft evaluations from ESPN, CBS Sports, and SB Nation.

In March, the WNBA season was postponed due to the COVID-19 pandemic. Jantel Lavender will miss this season due to recovery from surgery on a broken foot, and Sydney Colson missed the beginning of the season due to recovery from COVID-19. Stefanie Dolson was also afflicted with COVID-19, but recovered before the start of the delayed season. On June 29, the Sky signed guard Stella Johnson.

The Sky returned to play for the shortened 22-game regular season at IMG Academy on July 26. Their first game was a rematch against the Las Vegas Aces, the team who had beaten them in the previous year's playoffs. Despite the Aces leading for most of the game, the Sky won 88-86. The Sky ended July with a 2–1 record. On August 1, they notched a narrow win against the Mystics, the last undefeated team in the league, and improved to 3–1. Over the next six games, the Sky alternated wins and losses and held a record of 6–4 after 10 games. During this stretch, on August 10, Courtney Vandersloot was named Eastern Conference Player of the Week. The Sky then won four consecutive games, including blowout wins against the Atlanta Dream and the New York Liberty, to improve to 10–4. Vandersloot was again named Eastern Conference Player of the Week following this run of games. However, they proceeded to lose the next two games against the lowest-seeded Liberty and the top-seeded Seattle Storm.

On August 28, the Sky traded two draft picks and Jantel Lavender, who had been out for the season due to injury, in exchange for Stephanie Mavunga. On August 29, two key players for the Sky, Diamond DeShields and Azurá Stevens, exited the IMG Academy bubble. Stevens left due to an injury that would require her to miss the remainder of the season and DeShields left for personal reasons. Both players had missed the previous two games due to injuries. On August 31, the Sky signed forward Alisia Jenkins to a seven-day contract.

On August 31, the Sky rebounded from their two-game losing streak with a win against the Indiana Fever. Courtney Vandersloot recorded 18 assists in the game, breaking the all-time WNBA record for assists in a single game (16) previously held by Ticha Penicheiro. Vandersloot's record-breaking 17th and 18th assists came in passes to her wife, Allie Quigley.

== Game log ==
=== Regular season ===
2020 game log
Total: 12–10
July

Game	Date	Team	Score	High points	High rebounds	High assists	Location Attendance	Record
1	July 26	Las Vegas Aces	W 88-86	Copper (26)	Williams (7)	Vandersloot (11)	IMG Academy; No In-Person Attendance	1–0
2	July 28	Los Angeles Sparks	W 96-78	Copper / Stevens (21)	Copper (9)	Vandersloot (10)	IMG Academy; No In-Person Attendance	2–0
3	July 30	Minnesota Lynx	L 81-83	Parker / Stevens / Vandersloot (16)	Stevens (11)	DeShields (5)	IMG Academy; No In-Person Attendance	2-1

August

Game	Date	Team	Score	High points	High rebounds	High assists	Location Attendance	Record
4	August 1	Washington Mystics	W 88–86	Copper / Williams (16)	Williams (9)	Vandersloot (8)	IMG Academy; No In-Person Attendance	3-1
5	August 4	Dallas Wings	W 82-79	Parker / Stevens / Quigley (15)	Stevens (10)	Vandersloot (10)	IMG Academy; No In-Person Attendance	4–1
6	August 6	Phoenix Mercury	L 86–96	Vandersloot (21)	Parker (7)	Vandersloot (8)	IMG Academy; No In-Person Attendance	4–2
7	August 8	Connecticut Sun	W 100–93	Quigley (22)	Copper (7)	Vandersloot (11)	IMG Academy; No In-Person Attendance	5–2
8	August 10	Seattle Storm	L 71–89	Quigley (13)	Copper (6)	Vandersloot (9)	IMG Academy; No In-Person Attendance	5–3
9	August 12	Phoenix Mercury	W 89–71	Quigley (20)	Parker / Dolson (9)	Vandersloot (5)	IMG Academy; No In-Person Attendance	6–3
10	August 14	Connecticut Sun	L 74–77	Parker (17)	Stevens (8)	Vandersloot (7)	IMG Academy; No In-Person Attendance	6–4
11	August 16	Atlanta Dream	W 92–67	Parker (17)	Tied (6)	Colson (6)	IMG Academy; No In-Person Attendance	7–4
12	August 18	Las Vegas Aces	W 84–82	Copper (18)	Stevens (7)	Vandersloot (15)	IMG Academy; No In-Person Attendance	8–4
13	August 20	New York Liberty	W 101–85	Stevens (25)	Stevens (7)	Vandersloot (10)	IMG Academy; No In-Person Attendance	9–4
14	August 22	Indiana Fever	W 87–76	Copper (26)	Parker (8)	Vandersloot (9)	IMG Academy; No In-Person Attendance	10–4
15	August 25	New York Liberty	L 99–101	Quigley (29)	Williams (8)	Vandersloot (9)	IMG Academy; No In-Person Attendance	10–5
16	August 29	Seattle Storm	L 74–88	Copper (19)	Tied (6)	Vandersloot (9)	IMG Academy; No In-Person Attendance	10–6
17	August 31	Indiana Fever	W 100–77	Tied (21)	Hebard (11)	Vandersloot (18)	IMG Academy; No In-Person Attendance	11–6

September

Game	Date	Team	Score	High points	High rebounds	High assists	Location Attendance	Record
18	September 2	Minnesota Lynx	L 83–86	Quigley (23)	Parker (15)	Vandersloot (12)	IMG Academy; No In-Person Attendance	11–7
19	September 4	Washington Mystics	L 69–79	Parker (17)	Copper (10)	Vandersloot (11)	IMG Academy; No In-Person Attendance	11–8
20	September 6	Los Angeles Sparks	L 80–86	Parker (24)	Parker (10)	Vandersloot (15)	IMG Academy; No In-Person Attendance	11–9
21	September 9	Atlanta Dream	L 89–97	Vandersloot (22)	Tied (7)	Vandersloot (11)	IMG Academy; No In-Person Attendance	11–10
22	September 11	Dallas Wings	W 95–88	Parker (23)	Hebard (8)	Vandersloot (12)	IMG Academy; No In-Person Attendance	12–10

2020 season schedule

=== Playoffs ===
2020 playoff game log
Total: 0–1
First Round

Game	Date	Team	Score	High points	High rebounds	High assists	Location Attendance	Series
1	September 15	Connecticut Sun	L 81–94	Quigley (19)	Parker (8)	Vandersloot (6)	IMG Academy	0–1

2020 playoff schedule

== Standings ==
#	Team	W	L	PCT	GB	Conf.
1	x – Las Vegas Aces	18	4	.818	–	8–2
2	x – Seattle Storm	18	4	.818	–	8–2
3	x – Los Angeles Sparks	15	7	.682	3	5–5
4	x – Minnesota Lynx	14	8	.636	4	4–6
5	x – Phoenix Mercury	13	9	.591	5	4–6
6	x – Chicago Sky	12	10	.545	6	6–4
7	x – Connecticut Sun	10	12	.455	8	7–3
8	x – Washington Mystics	9	13	.409	9	6–4
9	e – Dallas Wings	8	14	.364	10	1–9
10	e – Atlanta Dream	7	15	.318	11	5–5
11	e – Indiana Fever	6	16	.273	12	4–6
12	e – New York Liberty	2	20	.091	16	2–8

Notes

x – Clinched playoff berth
e – Eliminated from playoffs
Home and Away records not shown, as all games played at a neutral location.
Updated to include results from September 13, 2020

== Playoffs ==
**First round** Single elimination (September 15)
5	**Phoenix Mercury**	**85**
8	Washington Mystics	84
6	Chicago Sky	81
7	**Connecticut Sun**	**94**

**Second round** Single elimination (September 17)
4	**Minnesota Lynx**	**80**
5	Phoenix Mercury	79
3	Los Angeles Sparks	59
7	**Connecticut Sun**	**73**

**Semifinals**; Best-of-5 (September 20–29)
1	**Las Vegas Aces**	**3**
7	Connecticut Sun	2
2	**Seattle Storm**	**3**
4	Minnesota Lynx	0

**WNBA Finals**; Best-of-5 (October 2–11)
1	Las Vegas Aces	0
2	**Seattle Storm**	**3**

Note: Teams re-seeded after each round.

- **Bold** – Game or series winner

== Statistics ==
Legend
GP	Games played	GS	Games started	MPG	Minutes per game	RPG	Rebounds per game
APG	Assists per game	SPG	Steals per game	BPG	Blocks per game	PPG	Points per game
FG%	Field-goal percentage	3P%	3-point field-goal percentage	FT%	Free-throw percentage	TO	Turnovers per game
PF	Fouls per game		Team leader		League leader

=== Regular season ===
Player	GP	GS	MPG	FG%	3P%	FT%	RPG	APG	SPG	BPG	PPG
Allie Quigley	22	22	28.7	44.8	34.6	91.9	2.9	2.4	0.6	0.3	15.4
Kahleah Copper	22	22	31.3	49.6	34.4	73.2	5.5	2.1	1.0	0.2	14.8
Courtney Vandersloot	22	22	31.5	49.1	39.5	88.9	3.5	10.0	1.2	0.4	13.6
Cheyenne Parker	20	13	24.9	55.4	46.9	85.5	6.4	1.5	1.3	0.9	13.4
Azurá Stevens	13	13	27.3	50.0	38.5	85.0	5.9	1.5	0.9	1.8	11.5
Gabby Williams	22	4	24.8	42.4	28.6	64.0	4.0	2.0	1.3	0.2	11.5
Diamond DeShields	13	0	17.2	43.4	16.7	77.8	1.8	1.5	0.9	0.1	6.8
Stefanie Dolson	15	8	18.2	49.3	37.5	73.7	3.5	1.7	0.4	0.9	6.4
Ruthy Hebard	22	6	14.5	68.2	0	75.0	3.9	0.3	0.5	0.4	5.7
Alexis Prince	2	0	8	60	66.7	0	1.5	0	0	0.5	4.0
Stephanie Mavunga	5	0	7.2	45.5	0	0	2.6	0.4	0.2	0	2.0
Sydney Colson	17	0	6.5	42.9	33.3	87.5	0.4	0.8	0.4	0	1.6

== Awards and honors ==
Recipient	Award	Date awarded	Ref.
Courtney Vandersloot	Eastern Conference Player of the Week	August 10, 2020	
Courtney Vandersloot	Eastern Conference Player of the Week	August 24, 2020	
Courtney Vandersloot	Eastern Conference Player of the Month – August	September 1, 2020	
Courtney Vandersloot	Peak Performer: Assists	September 14, 2020	
Courtney Vandersloot	All-WNBA First Team	October 4, 2020	
