= Gary Kloppenburg =

American basketball coach (born 1953)

Personal information
- Born: January 6, 1953 (age 73) Lindsay, California, U.S.

Career information
- High school: La Jolla (La Jolla, California)
- College: Feather River (1972–1974); UC San Diego (1978–1981)
- Position: Assistant coach
- Coaching career: 1983–present

Career history

Coaching
- 1983–1984: Feather River (men's asst.)
- 1984–1988: Feather River (men's)
- 1988–1993: Lassen CC
- 1993–1999: Lassen CC (men's)
- 1999–2000: Panteras de Miranda
- 2000–2002: Seattle Storm (assistant)
- 2003: Phoenix Mercury (assistant)
- 2004–2007: Charlotte Bobcats (assistant)
- 2008–2011: Indiana Fever (assistant)
- 2012–2013: Tulsa Shock
- 2014: Los Angeles Sparks (assistant)
- 2015–2016: Indiana Fever (assistant)
- 2017–2019: Seattle Storm (assistant)
- 2017: Seattle Storm (interim)
- 2020: Seattle Storm
- 2021: Seattle Storm (assistant)
- 2022: Indiana Fever (assistant)

Career highlights
- As head coach: WNBA champion (2020); 2× CCCAA champion (1992, 1993); As assistant coach: WNBA champion (2018)

Gary Robert Kloppenburg (born January 6, 1953) is an American basketball coach.

== Early life and college career ==
Kloppenburg was born in 1953, when his father Bob Kloppenburg was head coach at Lindsay High School in Lindsay, California. When Bob Kloppenburg became head coach of California Western (later U.S. International) University, Gary Kloppenburg later attended La Jolla High School in La Jolla, California, graduating in 1971.

From 1972 to 1974, Gary Kloppenburg attended Feather River College and played on the basketball team. Kloppenburg then played semi-professional basketball in Europe, first with the English National League in 1975–76 then in the Netherlands in 1977. He then returned to the U.S. and enrolled at the University of California, San Diego, where he played on the UC San Diego Tritons men's basketball team in the 1978–79 and 1980–81 seasons. Kloppenburg graduated from UC San Diego in 1981 with a B.A. in Spanish literature.

== Coaching career ==
Kloppenburg began his coaching career as an assistant men's basketball coach at Feather River College. In 1984, Kloppenburg became head coach. From 1988 to 1993, Kloppenburg was head women's basketball coach at Lassen Community College in Susanville, California, where he led the team to two consecutive California Community College Athletic Association titles in 1992 and 1993. From 1993 to 1999, Kloppenburg was head men's basketball coach at Lassen.

Kloppenburg served as an assistant coach with the Seattle Storm from 2000 through 2002 and Phoenix Mercury in 2003. He was an assistant coach of the Charlotte Bobcats of the National Basketball Association from 2004 to 2007, and an assistant coach of the Indiana Fever from 2008 through 2011 and Los Angeles Sparks in 2014.

Kloppenburg improved the Shock during his two-year tenure; nevertheless, he was fired after the 2013 season.

In 2017, Kloppenburg became an assistant for the Seattle Storm. Kloppenburg served as interim head coach on August 10, 2017, after head coach Jenny Boucek was fired. Kloppenburg stayed on the staff under new head coach Dan Hughes. In the 2019 season, Kloppenburg served as interim head coach during the time Hughes was recovering from cancer surgery. On June 29, 2020, Kloppenburg became head coach again after Hughes was determined to be at higher risk of illness from COVID-19.

== Coaching record ==
=== WNBA ===
Legend
Regular season	G	Games coached	W	Games won	L	Games lost	W–L %	Win–loss %
Playoffs	PG	Playoff games	PW	Playoff wins	PL	Playoff losses	PW–L %	Playoff win–loss %

Team	Year	G	W	L	W–L%	Finish	PG	PW	PL	PW–L%	Result
Tulsa	2012	34	9	25	.265	5th in West	—	—	—	—	Missed Playoffs
Tulsa	2013	34	11	23	.324	6th in West	—	—	—	—	Missed Playoffs
Seattle	2017	8	5	3	.625	5th in West	1	0	1	.000	Lost First Round
Seattle	2020	22	18	4	.818	2nd in West	6	6	0	1.000	Won WNBA Championship
Career		98	43	55	.439		7	6	1	.857	
