= Ezi Magbegor =

Australian basketball player (born 1999)

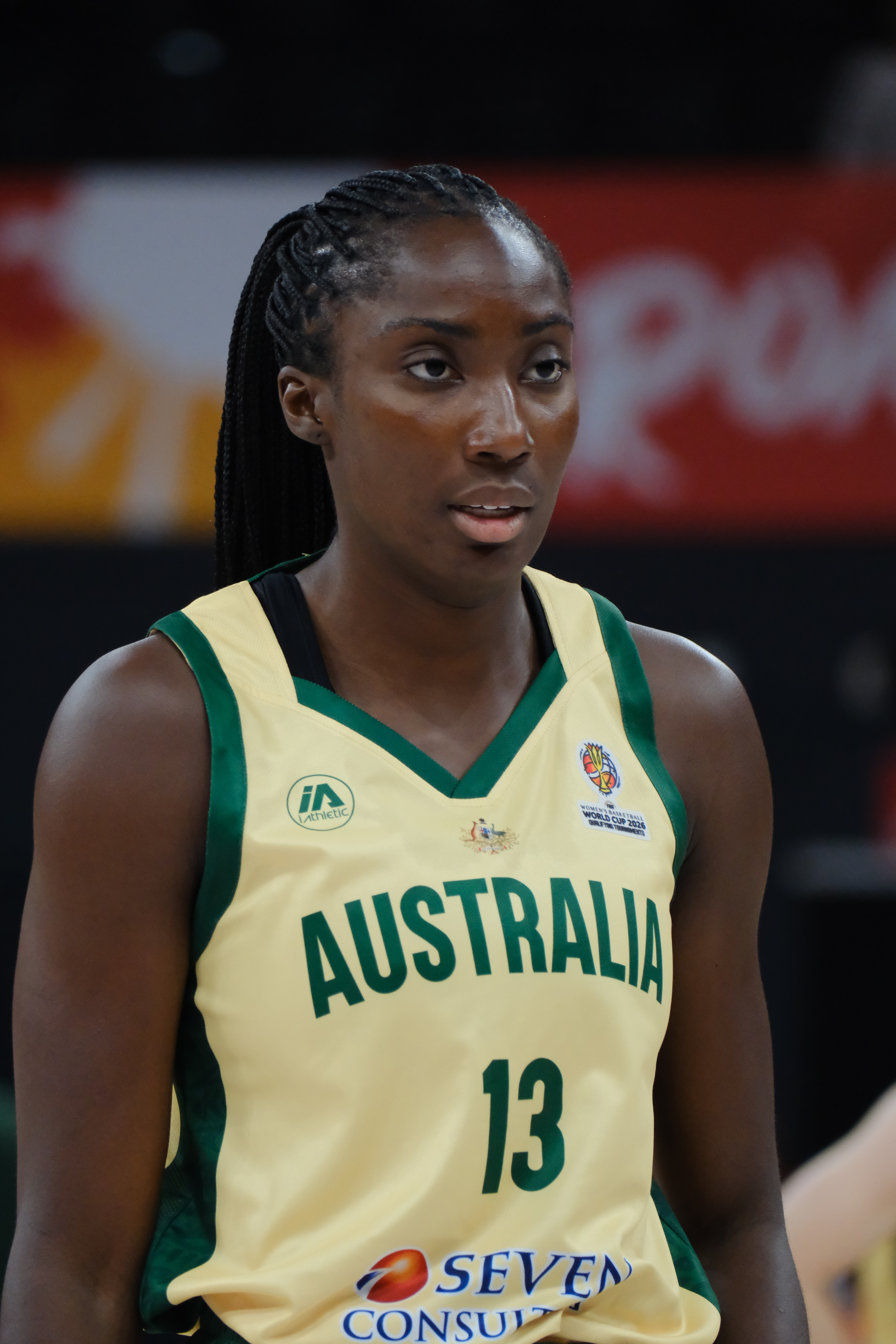
- Magbegor with the Australia in 2026

No. 13 – Seattle Storm
- Position: Forward/Center
- League: WNBA

Personal information
- Born: 13 August 1999 (age 27) Wellington, New Zealand
- Listed height: 6 ft 4 in (1.93 m)
- Listed weight: 181 lb (82 kg)

Career information
- High school: Lake Ginninderra College (Canberra, ACT)
- WNBA draft: 2019: 1st round, 12th overall pick
- Drafted by: Seattle Storm
- Playing career: 2017–present

Career history
- 2017–2018: Canberra Capitals
- 2018–2022: Melbourne Boomers
- 2020–present: Seattle Storm
- 2022–2023: Sopron Basket
- 2023–2025: USK Prague
- 2026–present: Hive BC

Career highlights
- EuroLeague Women champion (2025); All-EuroLeague Women First Team (2024); WNBA All-Star (2023); WNBA Champion (2020); Commissioner's Cup champion (2021); WNBA All-Defensive First Team (2024); 3× WNBA All-Defensive Second Team (2022, 2023, 2025); All-WNBL First Team (2022); All-WNBL Second Team (2020); 3× WNBL Youth Player of the Year (2018, 2020, 2022); FIBA U17 MVP (2016)
- Stats at WNBA.com
- Stats at Basketball Reference
Medals
Women's basketball
Representing Australia
Olympic Games
Bronze medal – third place	2024 Paris	Team
FIBA World Cup
Silver medal – second place	2018 Spain
Bronze medal – third place	2024 France
Bronze medal – third place	2022 Australia
FIBA Asia Cup
Bronze medal – third place	2019 Bangalore
Commonwealth Games
Gold medal – first place	2018 Gold Coast	Team

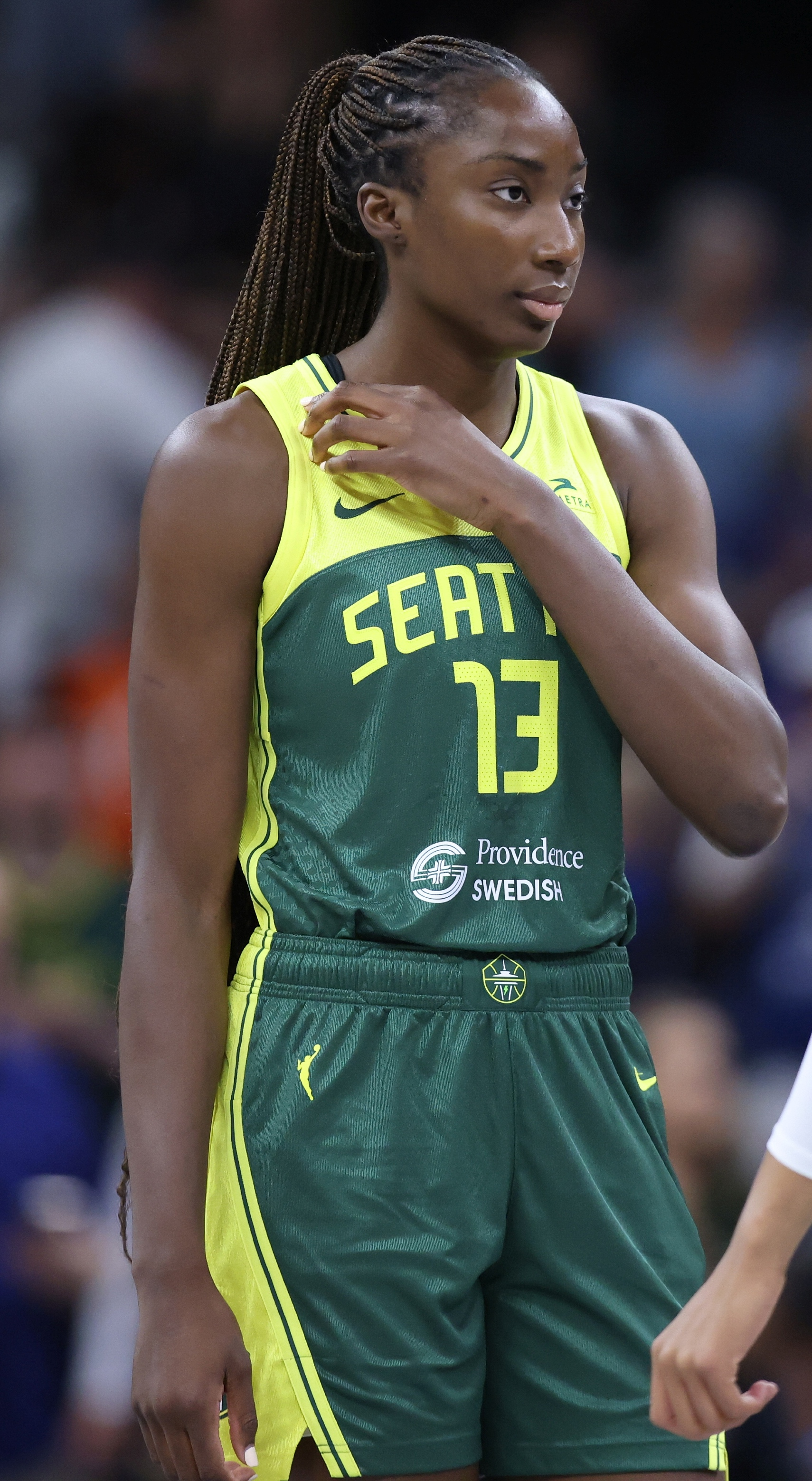
Magbegor with the Seattle Storm in 2024

Eziyoda Magbegor (born 13 August 1999) is an Australian professional basketball player for the Seattle Storm of the Women's National Basketball Association (WNBA) and for the Hive of Unrivaled. Magbegor was a member of the Australian women's basketball team (Opals) at the 2020 Tokyo Olympics, where the Opals were eliminated after losing to the USA in the quarterfinals. At the 2024 Summer Olympics she earned a bronze medal with the Australian team.

== Professional career ==
=== WNBL ===
After beginning her career in the South East Australian Basketball League (SEABL) with Basketball Australia's development team, the Centre of Excellence, Magbegor did not take long to gain attention from professional leagues. In July 2017, Magbegor was signed by the Canberra Capitals for the 2017–18 WNBL season. At a young age she began to draw comparisons to Lauren Jackson while being considered among Australian basketball's most promising talents.

In March 2018, it was announced that Magbegor had signed a three-year deal with the Melbourne Boomers. Magbegor first suited up for the Boomers in the 2018–19 WNBL season, choosing to stay home in Australia working alongside the likes of Jenna O'Hea, Lauren Jackson and Guy Molloy despite several offers from US colleges.

In February 2020, Magbegor was named the Betty Watson Australian Youth Player of the Year (formerly the WNBL Rookie of the Year award) at the Women's National Basketball League (WNBL) Awards, scoring 38 votes from a possible tally of 42 votes.

In April 2022, Magbegor was part of the Melbourne Boomers championship team before moving to play basketball next season in Hungary

=== WNBA ===
==== Seattle Storm (2020–present) ====
Magbegor was selected 12th overall by the Seattle Storm in the 2019 WNBA draft. At just 19 years old, she did not come over for the 2019 WNBA season, as both she and the Storm preferred that she remain in Australia to continue her development.

Magbegor joined the Storm for the 2020 WNBA season, which was played in the Wubble. In her rookie season, on a team with championship ambitions, Magbegor had a limited role. She averaged 13.3 minutes, 6.5 points, and 2.5 rebounds per game in the regular season, while shooting 56.9% from the floor, the ninth-best in the league. During the Storm's playoff run, she played only 35 minutes as the team went on to win the championship. Magbegor became the second-youngest player in history to win a WNBA championship.

In her second season with the Storm, Magbegor's role slightly increased, and she started three games in the regular season. The Storm won the inaugural WNBA Commissioner's Cup and finished fourth in the regular season standings. However, they were unable to replicate their previous playoff success, losing to the Phoenix Mercury in a second-round single-elimination game. In that matchup, Magbegor made her first career playoff start, as Seattle was without their star forward Breanna Stewart due to injury.

In her third season with the Storm, Magbegor became a regular starter, starting in 23 games and averaging 24.8 minutes per game. However, she eventually lost her starting spot to midseason signing Tina Charles. In the playoffs, Magbegor's playing time decreased to an average of 15.5 minutes per game as the Storm fell to the eventual champions Las Vegas Aces 1–3 in the semifinals. Nonetheless, it was a successful season for Magbegor who was named to the WNBA All-Defensive Second Team for the first time in her career.

Before the 2023 season, Magbegor signed a two-year deal with the Storm. With Seattle losing Breanna Stewart and Tina Charles to free agency, and Sue Bird to retirement, the 2023 Seattle Storm season marked the start of a new chapter. Magbegor took on an undisputed starting role, starting all 40 games and averaging 32.6 minutes per game. She posted career-highs in all statistical categories and earned her first-ever selection to the WNBA All-Star Game. Magbegor was also named to the WNBA All-Defensive Second Team for the second consecutive season. Despite her individual success, the Storm, with a much younger and less experienced roster, struggled and missed the playoffs for the first time since 2015.

For the 2024 season, the Storm significantly strengthened their roster by signing star free agents Nneka Ogwumike and Skylar Diggins-Smith. Alongside these two and Jewell Loyd, Magbegor formed what the team marketed as the "Core Four." In June, Magbegor signed a one-year contract extension with the Storm. She started 37 games in the regular season, missing only the final three due to a concussion. As a result of being in the concussion protocol, she also missed the first playoff game against the Aces. Although she returned for the second game, her efforts could not prevent another loss, which led to the Storm's elimination from the playoffs. Despite her solid performances, Magbegor was not selected for the 2024 WNBA All-Star Game, a decision ESPN's Kevin Pelton described as "the most egregious omission ever." However, she received three votes for the WNBA Defensive Player of the Year Award and was named to the WNBA All-Defensive First Team for the first time in her career.

=== Unrivaled ===
On November 5, 2025, it was announced that Magbegor had been drafted by Hive BC for the 2026 Unrivaled season.

== National team career ==
=== Youth level ===
Magbegor made her international debut at the 2015 FIBA Under-19 World Championship in Russia, with the U19 Gems as a 16 year old. She then represented the U17 Sapphires at the 2015 Oceania Championships. Dominating the tournament, averaging 18 points per game and helping Australia take home Gold. Magbegor then lead the Sapphires to their inaugural World Championship title in Spain. After snapping team USA's 28-game win streak at U17 level, Australia went on to take home Gold. Alongside two of her teammates, Magbegor was named to the All-Tournament Team. In addition to this, she received the Most Valuable Player award.

=== Senior level ===
In December 2017, Magbegor was named to her first Opals squad, earning her a place in the first camp as preparations for this years upcoming tournaments got underway. After taking part in the team camp in February, Magbegor was then named to the final roster for the 2018 Commonwealth Games where she would make her Opals debut. Magbegor starred for the Opals at the Tokyo 2020 Olympics, having a standout game in Australia's win against the US in a pre-tournament friendly with 17 points, equal most in the game with Breanna Stewart. Magbegor then top scored for Australia during the Olympic tournament with 20 points and eight rebounds in the game against Belgium (her Olympic debut), and 15 points against China.

Magbegor, like all the other members of the 2020 Tokyo Olympics Opals women's basketball team, had a difficult tournament. The Opals lost their first two group stage matches. They looked flat against Belgium and then lost to China in heartbreaking circumstances. In their last group match the Opals needed to beat Puerto Rico by 25 or more in their final match to progress. This they did by 27 in a very exciting match. However, they lost to the United States in their quarterfinal 79 to 55.

Magbegor returned to the spotlight at the 2024 Summer Olympics in Paris. The Opals won the bronze medal with a win over Belgium. Magbegor starred in that match, scoring 30 points on 71 percent shooting, while also contributing 13 rebounds, three blocks, three assists and two steals. Her performance won her credit for both her offensive and defensive achievement.

== Career statistics ==
Legend
GP	Games played	GS	Games started	MPG	Minutes per game	RPG	Rebounds per game
APG	Assists per game	SPG	Steals per game	BPG	Blocks per game	PPG	Points per game
TO	Turnovers per game	FG%	Field-goal percentage	3P%	3-point field-goal percentage	FT%	Free-throw percentage
**Bold**	Career best	°	League leader

†	Denotes season(s) in which Magbegor won a WNBA championship

=== WNBA ===
==== Regular season ====
Stats current through the 2026 season

WNBA regular season statistics
Year	Team	GP	GS	MPG	FG%	3P%	FT%	RPG	APG	SPG	BPG	TO	PPG
2019	Did not appear in league												
2020^{†}	Seattle	22	0	13.3	**.569**	.333	.704	2.5	0.3	0.5	0.7	**0.4**	6.5
2021	Seattle	30	3	15.2	.506	**.556**	.846	3.9	0.8	0.6	1.0	0.9	6.7
2022	Seattle	33	23	24.8	.550	.345	.736	5.6	1.4	0.9	1.8	1.4	9.5
2023	Seattle	40	40	**32.6**	.513	.385	.699	**8.1**	**2.6**	**1.1**	1.9	2.4	**13.8**
2024	Seattle	37	37	30.7	.512	.245	.874	8.0	2.0	**1.1**	**2.2**	1.4	11.7
2025	Seattle	**44**	**44**	27.3	.493	.292	.687	6.2	2.1	0.7	**2.2**	1.0	8.0
2026	Seattle	14	9	20.4	.398	.308	**.875**	4.0	1.8	0.8	1.2	1.1	6.9
**Career**	7 years, 1 team	220	156	25.0	.511	.329	.757	5.9	1.7	0.8	1.7	1.3	9.5
**Career**	All-Star	1	0	12.1	.250	.000	—	4.0	2.0	0.0	0.0	1.0	2.0

==== Playoffs ====
WNBA playoff statistics
Year	Team	GP	GS	MPG	FG%	3P%	FT%	RPG	APG	SPG	BPG	TO	PPG
2020^{†}	Seattle	**6**	0	5.8	.222	.000	**1.000**	1.2	0.3	0.0	0.2	**0.0**	1.0
2021	Seattle	1	1	**31.0**	.444	**1.000**	—	**9.0**	2.0	0.0	**1.0**	1.0	9.0
2022	Seattle	**6**	0	15.5	.583	—	.667	2.7	1.0	0.7	**1.0**	0.2	5.0
2024	Seattle	1	1	28.0	**.600**	.667	.000	7.0	2.0	0.0	0.0	**0.0**	**14.0**
2025	Seattle	3	**3**	24.7	.583	.000	.250	4.3	**2.3**	**1.0**	**1.0**	0.7	5.0
**Career**	5 years, 1 team	17	5	15.4	.516	.375	.455	3.1	1.1	0.4	0.6	0.2	4.4

== Personal life ==
Born in Wellington, New Zealand to Nigerian parents, Magbegor moved to Australia with her family at age six. As of 2021, Magbegor is currently studying a Bachelor of Psychology at Deakin University; she had initially been studying a Bachelor of Commerce in 2019. In 2021, Magbegor was named as Deakin University's Female Sportsperson of the Year.
