= 2020 Seattle Storm season =

- WNBA champions
- Head coach: Gary Kloppenburg
- Arena: Originally: Alaska Airlines Arena; Angel of the Winds Arena; Rescheduled to: IMG Academy gymnasiums, Bradenton, Florida

Results
- Record: 18–4 (.818)
- Place: 2nd (Western)
- Playoff finish: 2nd Seed, WNBA Champions - beat Las Vegas Aces 3–0 in the Finals

The 2020 Seattle Storm season was the franchise's 21st season in the Women's National Basketball Association (WNBA). The regular season was originally scheduled to tip off at home versus the Dallas Wings on May 15, 2020. However, the beginning of the 2020 WNBA schedule was delayed due to the COVID-19 pandemic. The shortened season tipped off on July 25, 2020, versus the New York Liberty.

Due to ongoing renovations at Climate Pledge Arena the Storm will continue to split time between the Alaska Airlines Arena and the Angel of the Winds Arena.

This WNBA season would have featured an all-time high 36 regular-season games. However, the plan for expanded games was put on hold on April 3, when the WNBA postponed its season due to the COVID-19 pandemic. Under a plan approved on June 15, the league was scheduled to hold a shortened 22-game regular season at IMG Academy, without fans present, starting on July 24. Gary Kloppenburg was named the interim head coach for the year, when Dan Hughes announced he would sit out the season due to COVID-19 concerns.

The Storm got off to a hot start, winning their first two games before losing to last' years champions Washington. They then went on a nine-game winning streak, and their record sat at 10–1 halfway through the season. The winning streak was ended by a two-game losing streak, just after the halfway mark of the season. The Storm then rallied for seven straight wins and were 18–3 entering the final game of the regular season. They faced off against the 17–4 Las Vegas Aces. With a win, the Storm could secure the first seed in the playoffs. A loss, would mean the Storm would be the second seed via tie-breaker rules. The Aces prevailed 86–84, and the Storm ended up as the second seed.

As the second seed, the Storm received a double-bye into the Semifinals and would play the higher remaining seed. They faced off against the fourth seed Minnesota Lynx. The Storm swept the series three games to none. The first game was a close one, with the Storm winning by two points, but they won the second two games by double digits to advance to the finals. In the finals, they faced off against the Aces again. The Storm again swept the series, three games to none. No game was very close, with the Storm winning the first two games by thirteen, and the third game by thirty three points. The Storm won their fourth WNBA Championship.

== Transactions ==
=== WNBA draft ===
Round	Pick	Player	Nationality	School/Team/Country
1	11	Kitija Laksa	Latvia	South Florida/TTT Riga (Latvia)
2	19	Joyner Holmes	United States	Texas
3	31	Haley Gorecki	United States	Duke

=== Trades and roster changes ===
Date	Details
February 10, 2020	Traded the 7th pick in the 2020 WNBA draft to the Connecticut Sun in exchange for the 11th pick in the 2020 WNBA draft and F Morgan Tuck.
February 11, 2020	Re-signed F Breanna Stewart
February 24, 2020	Acquired the Connecticut Sun's 2nd round pick in the 2021 WNBA draft in exchange for F Kaleena Mosqueda-Lewis
February 24, 2020	Signed G Epiphanny Prince
February 25, 2020	Re-signed G Sue Bird

== Roster ==
2020 Seattle Storm roster
Players
Coaches

Pos.	No.	Nat.	Name	Height	Weight	DOB	From	Yrs
G	10	(United States)	Bird, Sue	5' 9" (1.75m)	150 lb (68kg)	1980-10-16	Connecticut	16
G	21	(United States)	Canada, Jordin	5' 6" (1.68m)	135 lb (61kg)	1995-08-11	UCLA	2
F	32	(Israel)	Clark, Alysha	5' 11" (1.8m)	167 lb (76kg)	1987-07-07	Middle Tennessee	8
F	6	(United States)	Howard, Natasha	6' 2" (1.88m)	165 lb (75kg)	1991-09-02	Florida State	6
F/C	1	(United States)	Langhorne, Crystal	6' 2" (1.88m)	185 lb (84kg)	1986-10-27	Maryland	12
G	24	(United States)	Loyd, Jewell	5' 10" (1.78m)	148 lb (67kg)	1993-10-05	Notre Dame	5
F	0	(Australia)	Magbegor, Eziyoda	6' 4" (1.93m)	176 lb (80kg)	1999-08-13	Australia	R
G	11	(Russia)	Prince, Epiphanny	5' 9" (1.75m)	179 lb (81kg)	1988-01-11	Rutgers	10
C	2	(United States)	Russell, Mercedes	6' 6" (1.98m)	195 lb (88kg)	1995-07-27	Tennessee	2
F	30	(United States)	Stewart, Breanna	6' 4" (1.93m)	170 lb (77kg)	1994-08-27	Connecticut	3
F	3	(United States)	Tuck, Morgan	6' 2" (1.88m)	207 lb (94kg)	1994-04-30	Connecticut	4
G	33	(Australia)	Whitcomb, Sami	5' 10" (1.78m)	145 lb (66kg)	1988-07-20	Washington	3

Head coach
(United States) Gary Kloppenburg (UC San Diego)
Assistant coaches
(United States) Noelle Quinn (UCLA)
(United States) Ryan Webb (Seattle)

Legend

- (C) Team captain
- (DP) Unsigned draft pick
- (FA) Free agent
- (S) Suspended
- Injured

== Game log ==
=== Regular season ===
2020 game log
Total: 18–4
July

Game	Date	Team	Score	High points	High rebounds	High assists	Location Attendance	Record
1	July 25	New York Liberty	W 87–71	Stewart (18)	Stewart (8)	Bird (5)	IMG Academy; 0	1–0
2	July 28	Minnesota Lynx	W 90–66	Stewart (18)	Stewart (10)	Loyd (6)	IMG Academy; 0	2–0
3	July 30	Washington Mystics	L 71–89	Stewart (15)	Stewart (10)	Clark (4)	IMG Academy; 0	2–1

August

Game	Date	Team	Score	High points	High rebounds	High assists	Location Attendance	Record
4	August 1	Los Angeles Sparks	W 81–75	Stewart (21)	Stewart (9)	Clark (6)	IMG Academy; 0	3–1
5	August 4	Connecticut Sun	W 87–74	Stewart (22)	Howard (6)	Canada (6)	IMG Academy; 0	4–1
6	August 6	Atlanta Dream	W 93–92	Stewart (27)	Stewart (8)	Canada (6)	IMG Academy; 0	5–1
7	August 8	Phoenix Mercury	W 74–68	Loyd (20)	Howard (10)	Canada (10)	IMG Academy; 0	6–1
8	August 10	Chicago Sky	W 89–71	Stewart (25)	Howard (7)	Stewart (7)	IMG Academy; 0	7–1
9	August 12	Atlanta Dream	W 100–63	Tied (20)	Stewart (9)	Canada (10)	IMG Academy; 0	8–1
10	August 14	Dallas Wings	W 83–65	Stewart (21)	Howard (8)	Bird (5)	IMG Academy; 0	9–1
11	August 16	Connecticut Sun	W 95–72	Stewart (19)	Howard (11)	Loyd (5)	IMG Academy; 0	10–1
12	August 18	New York Liberty	W 105–64	Prince (16)	Howard (11)	Bird (7)	IMG Academy; 0	11–1
13	August 20	Indiana Fever	L 84–90	Loyd (35)	3 tied (5)	Canada (6)	IMG Academy; 0	11–2
14	August 22	Las Vegas Aces	L 74–82	Stewart (29)	Stewart (18)	Canada (7)	IMG Academy; 0	11–3
15	August 25	Indiana Fever	W 87–74	Stewart (27)	Tied (9)	Canada (5)	IMG Academy; 0	12–3
16	August 29	Chicago Sky	W 88–74	Stewart (21)	Howard (15)	Canada (9)	IMG Academy; 0	13–3

September

Game	Date	Team	Score	High points	High rebounds	High assists	Location Attendance	Record
17	September 2	Washington Mystics	W 71–64	Stewart (16)	Stewart (14)	Canada (5)	IMG Academy; 0	14–3
18	September 4	Los Angeles Sparks	W 90–89	Loyd (25)	Stewart (8)	Stewart (9)	IMG Academy; 0	15–3
19	September 6	Minnesota Lynx	W 103–88	Howard (19)	Clark (5)	Tied (7)	IMG Academy; 0	16–3
20	September 9	Dallas Wings	W 107–95	Tied (23)	Stewart (11)	Bird (9)	IMG Academy; 0	17–3
21	September 11	Phoenix Mercury	W 80–63	Canada (13)	Tied (7)	Loyd (5)	IMG Academy; 0	18–3
22	September 13	Las Vegas Aces	L 84–86	Loyd (30)	Russell (11)	Canada (5)	IMG Academy; 0	18–4

2020 season schedule

=== Playoffs ===
2020 playoff game log
Total: 6–0
Semifinals

Game	Date	Team	Score	High points	High rebounds	High assists	Location Attendance	Series
1	September 22	Minnesota Lynx	W 88–86	Loyd (25)	Stewart (10)	Bird (8)	IMG Academy	1–0
2	September 24	Minnesota Lynx	W 89–79	Loyd (20)	Stewart (8)	Stewart (7)	IMG Academy	2–0
3	September 27	Minnesota Lynx	W 92–71	Stewart (31)	Clark (9)	Bird (9)	IMG Academy	3–0

Finals

Game	Date	Team	Score	High points	High rebounds	High assists	Location Attendance	Series
1	October 2	Las Vegas Aces	W 93–80	Stewart (37)	Stewart (15)	Bird (16)	IMG Academy	1–0
2	October 4	Las Vegas Aces	W 104–91	Stewart (22)	Howard (8)	Bird (10)	IMG Academy	2–0
3	October 6	Las Vegas Aces	W 92–59	Stewart (26)	Loyd (9)	Bird (7)	IMG Academy	3–0

2013 playoff schedule

== Standings ==
#	Team	W	L	PCT	GB	Conf.
1	x – Las Vegas Aces	18	4	.818	–	8–2
2	x – Seattle Storm	18	4	.818	–	8–2
3	x – Los Angeles Sparks	15	7	.682	3	5–5
4	x – Minnesota Lynx	14	8	.636	4	4–6
5	x – Phoenix Mercury	13	9	.591	5	4–6
6	x – Chicago Sky	12	10	.545	6	6–4
7	x – Connecticut Sun	10	12	.455	8	7–3
8	x – Washington Mystics	9	13	.409	9	6–4
9	e – Dallas Wings	8	14	.364	10	1–9
10	e – Atlanta Dream	7	15	.318	11	5–5
11	e – Indiana Fever	6	16	.273	12	4–6
12	e – New York Liberty	2	20	.091	16	2–8

Notes

x – Clinched playoff berth
e – Eliminated from playoffs
Home and Away records not shown, as all games played at a neutral location.
Updated to include results from September 13, 2020

== Playoffs ==
**First round** Single elimination (September 15)
5	**Phoenix Mercury**	**85**
8	Washington Mystics	84
6	Chicago Sky	81
7	**Connecticut Sun**	**94**

**Second round** Single elimination (September 17)
4	**Minnesota Lynx**	**80**
5	Phoenix Mercury	79
3	Los Angeles Sparks	59
7	**Connecticut Sun**	**73**

**Semifinals**; Best-of-5 (September 20–29)
1	**Las Vegas Aces**	**3**
7	Connecticut Sun	2
2	**Seattle Storm**	**3**
4	Minnesota Lynx	0

**WNBA Finals**; Best-of-5 (October 2–11)
1	Las Vegas Aces	0
2	**Seattle Storm**	**3**

Note: Teams re-seeded after each round.

- **Bold** – Game or series winner

== Statistics ==
Legend
GP	Games played	GS	Games started	MPG	Minutes per game	RPG	Rebounds per game
APG	Assists per game	SPG	Steals per game	BPG	Blocks per game	PPG	Points per game
FG%	Field-goal percentage	3P%	3-point field-goal percentage	FT%	Free-throw percentage	TO	Turnovers per game
PF	Fouls per game		Team leader		League leader

=== Regular season ===
Player	GP	GS	MPG	FG%	3P%	FT%	RPG	APG	SPG	BPG	PPG
Breanna Stewart	20	20	30.4	45.1	36.8	89.4	8.3	3.6	1.7	1.3	19.7
Jewell Loyd	22	22	27.9	44.3	39.0	87.5	2.4	3.2	1.5	0.3	15.5
Alysha Clark	22	22	28.8	55.8	52.2	80.0	4.2	2.7	1.5	0.5	10.0
Sue Bird	11	11	23.4	49.4	46.9	75.0	1.7	5.2	0.6	0.2	9.8
Natasha Howard	22	22	21.0	53.0	35.0	77.8	7.1	1.0	1.7	0.6	9.5
Sami Whitcomb	22	0	16.5	44.3	38.1	100	2.3	2.0	0.7	0.1	8.1
Jordin Canada	20	11	24.2	42.4	9.1	77.2	2.3	5.5	1.5	0	7.9
Ezi Magbegor	22	0	13.3	56.9	33.3	70.4	2.5	0.3	0.5	0.7	6.5
Epiphanny Prince	15	0	12.7	38.6	33.3	84.6	1.2	1.4	0.4	0.1	4.3
Mercedes Russell	22	2	13.8	41.0	0	56	3.2	0.6	0.4	0.4	3.5
Morgan Tuck	10	0	8.8	31.3	22.2	62.5	0.6	0.2	0.5	0	1.7
Crystal Langhorne	13	0	8.2	41.2	20	50	2.2	0.5	0.1	0.1	1.4

== Awards and honors ==
Recipient	Award	Date awarded	Ref.
Breanna Stewart	Western Conference Player of the Week	August 3, 2020	
Breanna Stewart	Western Conference Player of the Week	August 31, 2020	
Alysha Clark	1st Team All-Defense	September 29, 2020	
Breanna Stewart	2nd Team All-Defense	September 29, 2020	
Breanna Stewart	All-WNBA First Team	October 4, 2020	
Breanna Stewart	Finals MVP	October 6, 2020	
