= 2020 Atlanta Dream season =

- Head coach: Nicki Collen
- Arena: Originally: Gateway Center Arena; Rescheduled to: IMG Academy gymnasiums, Bradenton, Florida

Results
- Record: 7–15 (.318)
- Place: 4th (Eastern)
- Playoff finish: Did not qualify

The 2020 WNBA season was the 13th season for the Atlanta Dream of the Women's National Basketball Association (WNBA). The season began on 26 July 2020, against the Dallas Wings.

On 18 October 2019, the Dream unveiled a rebranded logo and color scheme ahead of the new season. The team was originally scheduled to play its home games at the new Gateway Center Arena at College Park, electing to move from State Farm Arena in the 2019 off-season. The WNBA season was to have a 36-game schedule, which would have been the most games in a season in league history. However, the plan for expanded games was put on hold on 3 April 2020 , when the WNBA postponed its season due to the COVID-19 pandemic. Under a plan approved on 15 June 2020, the league is scheduled to hold a shortened 22-game regular season at IMG Academy, without fans in attendance, beginning on 24 July 2020.

The Dream started the season promisingly, winning two of their first three games, but then suffered a ten game losing streak. After the ten game losing streak was broken, the Dream lost their next two games to finish August with a 3–13 record, and a slim hope at making the playoffs. September proved to be a turn in fortunes for the Dream. They recorded four wins in five games to go into their final game against the Washington Mystics, with a chance to make the playoffs. However, Washington prevailed and the Dream missed the playoffs. Their overall winning percentage of .318 was the third worst in team history.

== Transactions ==
=== WNBA draft ===
The Dream made the following selections in the 2020 WNBA draft.

Round	Pick	Player	Nationality	School/team/country
1	4	Chennedy Carter	United States	Texas A&M
2	17	Brittany Brewer	United States	Texas Tech
3	25	Mikayla Pivec	United States	Oregon State
3	27	Kobi Thornton	United States	Clemson

=== Trades and roster changes ===
Date	Details
January 21, 2020	Exercised 4th-year Team tption on Marie Gülich and Monique Billings
January 21, 2020	Extended a qualifying offer to Alaina Coates
January 22, 2020	Renounced the rights to Celine Dumerc and Isabelle Yacoubou
February 10, 2020	Traded Brittney Sykes and Marie Gülich to the Los Angeles Sparks in exchange for Kalani Brown
February 12, 2020	Signed Glory Johnson
February 16, 2020	Signed Shekinna Stricklen
February 18, 2020	Claimed Alexis Jones off waivers
February 19, 2020	Traded Jessica Breland and Nia Coffey to the Phoenix Mercury in exchange for Courtney Williams and the 17th pick in the 2020 WNBA draft from the Connecticut Sun, as part of a 3-team trade
February 23, 2020	Signed Blake Dietrick to a training-camp contract
February 25, 2020	Signed Elīna Babkina to a training-camp contract
April 16, 2020	Signed Alaina Coates to a training-camp contract
April 19, 2020	Signed Mikayla Pivec to a rookie-scale contract
April 20, 2020	Signed Brittany Brewer to a rookie-scale contract
April 23, 2020	Signed Chennedy Carter to a rookie-scale contract
April 27, 2020	Waived Alaina Coates
May 23, 2020	Waived Elīna Babkina
May 24, 2020	Full season suspension of Maite Cazorla due to her sitting out the 2020 season for personal reasons
May 25, 2020	Full season suspension of Mikayla Pivec due to her sitting out the 2020 season for personal reasons
June 18, 2020	Renee Montgomery opted out of the 2020 season
June 23, 2020	Tiffany Hayes opted out of the 2020 season
June 24, 2020	Signed Betnijah Laney and Jaylyn Agnew
July 12, 2020	Signed Erica McCall to a hardship contract
July 29, 2020	Released Erica McCall from her Hhrdship contract
August 23, 2020	Waived Alexis Jones
August 23, 2020	Signed Kaela Davis to a 7-day contract
August 31, 2020	Signed Kaela Davis to a 2nd 7-day contract
September 7, 2020	Signed Kaela Davis

== Roster ==
2020 Atlanta Dream roster
Players
Coaches

Pos.	No.	Nat.	Name	Height	Weight	DOB	From	Yrs
F	5	(United States)	Agnew, Jaylyn	5' 11" (1.8m)	149 lb (68kg)	1997-07-21	Creighton	R
F	25	(United States)	Billings, Monique	6' 4" (1.93m)	192 lb (87kg)	1996-05-02	UCLA	2
F	20	(United States)	Brewer, Brittany	6' 5" (1.96m)	182 lb (83kg)	1997-11-06	Texas Tech	R
C	22	(United States)	Brown, Kalani	6' 7" (2.01m)	245 lb (111kg)	1997-03-21	Baylor	1
G	3	(United States)	Carter, Chennedy	5' 9" (1.75m)	143 lb (65kg)	1998-11-14	Texas A&M	R
F	33	(United States)	Davis, Kaela	6' 2" (1.88m)	170 lb (77kg)	1995-03-15	South Carolina	3
G	11	(United States)	Dietrick, Blake	5' 10" (1.78m)	169 lb (77kg)	1993-07-19	Princeton	3
F	0	(Montenegro)	Johnson, Glory	6' 3" (1.91m)	170 lb (77kg)	1990-07-27	Tennessee	7
G/F	44	(United States)	Laney, Betnijah	6' 0" (1.83m)	166 lb (75kg)	1993-10-29	Rutgers	4
F	40	(United States)	Stricklen, Shekinna	6' 2" (1.88m)	230 lb (104kg)	1990-07-30	Tennessee	8
G	10	(United States)	Williams, Courtney	5' 8" (1.73m)	133 lb (60kg)	1994-05-11	South Florida	4
F/C	1	(United States)	Williams, Elizabeth	6' 3" (1.91m)	200 lb (91kg)	1993-06-23	Duke	5

Head coach
(United States) Nicki Collen (Marquette)
Assistant coaches
(United States) Mike Peterson (Bushnell)
(United States) Darius Taylor (Michigan)
Athletic trainer
(United States) Natalie Trotter
Strength and conditioning coach
(United States) Jamal Baptiste

Legend

- (C) Team captain
- (DP) Unsigned draft pick
- (FA) Free agent
- (S) Suspended
- Injured

=== Depth ===
Pos.	Starter	Bench
C	Elizabeth Williams	Kalani Brown; Brittany Brewer
PF	Monique Billings	Glory Johnson
SF	Betnijah Laney	Shekinna Stricklen; Kaela Davis
SG	Courtney Williams	Jaylyn Agnew
PG	Chennedy Carter	Blake Dietrick

== Schedule ==
=== Regular season ===
2020 game log
Regular season total: 7–15
July

Game	Date	Team	Score	High points	High rebounds	High assists	Location Attendance	Record
1	July 26	Dallas	W 105–95	Billings (30)	Billings (13)	Carter (8)	IMG Academy	1–0
2	July 29	Las Vegas	L 70–100	E. Williams (16)	Billings (7)	Tied (4)	IMG Academy	1–1
3	July 31	New York	W 84–78	Laney (30)	Billings (15)	Carter (3)	IMG Academy	2–1

August

Game	Date	Team	Score	High points	High rebounds	High assists	Location Attendance	Record
4	August 2	Indiana	L 77–93	C. Williams (18)	Billings (8)	Laney (6)	IMG Academy	2–2
5	August 4	Phoenix	L 74–81	Carter (26)	C. Williams (9)	Laney (5)	IMG Academy	2–3
6	August 6	Seattle	L 92–93	Carter (35)	C. Williams (10)	Carter (7)	IMG Academy	2–4
7	August 8	Dallas	L 75–85	Laney (16)	Tied (7)	3 tied (3)	IMG Academy	2–5
8	August 10	Connecticut	L 82–93	Stricklen (18)	C. Williams (7)	Dietrick (6)	IMG Academy	2–6
9	August 12	Seattle	L 63–100	Laney (17)	Tied (7)	Dietrick (4)	IMG Academy	2–7
10	August 14	Phoenix	L 80–96	Laney (16)	C. Williams (14)	Dietrick (7)	IMG Academy	2–8
11	August 16	Chicago	L 67–92	C. Williams (15)	Billings (8)	Tied (4)	IMG Academy	2–9
12	August 19	Washington	L 91–98	Laney (35)	Billings (12)	C. Williams (7)	IMG Academy	2–10
13	August 21	Los Angeles	L 85–93 (OT)	Johnson (23)	Billings (9)	Laney (11)	IMG Academy	2–11
14	August 23	Minnesota	W 78–75	Tied (16)	Billings (13)	Laney (10)	IMG Academy	3–11
15	August 28	Minnesota	L 79–88	Laney (22)	C. Williams (10)	Tied (5)	IMG Academy	3–12
16	August 30	Los Angeles	L 79–84	Carter (26)	Billings (14)	Dietrick (5)	IMG Academy	3–13

September

Game	Date	Team	Score	High points	High rebounds	High assists	Location Attendance	Record
17	September 1	Indiana	W 102–90	Tied (22)	Johnson (8)	Carter (6)	IMG Academy	4–13
18	September 3	New York	W 62–56	C. Williams (15)	C. Williams (13)	Laney (3)	IMG Academy	5–13
19	September 5	Las Vegas	L 79–89	Laney (21)	3 tied (7)	Carter (6)	IMG Academy	5–14
20	September 9	Chicago	W 97–89	Laney (24)	3 tied (10)	Tied (5)	IMG Academy	6–14
21	September 11	Connecticut	W 82–75	Carter (22)	Laney (10)	Tied (4)	IMG Academy	7–14
22	September 13	Washington	L 78–85	Laney (27)	C. Williams (11)	Dietrick (4)	IMG Academy	7–15

2020 season schedule

== Standings ==
#	Team	W	L	PCT	GB	Conf.
1	x – Las Vegas Aces	18	4	.818	–	8–2
2	x – Seattle Storm	18	4	.818	–	8–2
3	x – Los Angeles Sparks	15	7	.682	3	5–5
4	x – Minnesota Lynx	14	8	.636	4	4–6
5	x – Phoenix Mercury	13	9	.591	5	4–6
6	x – Chicago Sky	12	10	.545	6	6–4
7	x – Connecticut Sun	10	12	.455	8	7–3
8	x – Washington Mystics	9	13	.409	9	6–4
9	e – Dallas Wings	8	14	.364	10	1–9
10	e – Atlanta Dream	7	15	.318	11	5–5
11	e – Indiana Fever	6	16	.273	12	4–6
12	e – New York Liberty	2	20	.091	16	2–8

Notes

x – Clinched playoff berth
e – Eliminated from playoffs
Home and Away records not shown, as all games played at a neutral location.
Updated to include results from September 13, 2020

== Statistics ==
Legend
GP	Games played	GS	Games started	MPG	Minutes per game	RPG	Rebounds per game
APG	Assists per game	SPG	Steals per game	BPG	Blocks per game	PPG	Points per game
FG%	Field-goal percentage	3P%	3-point field-goal percentage	FT%	Free-throw percentage	TO	Turnovers per game
PF	Fouls per game		Team leader		League leader

=== Regular season ===
Player	GP	GS	MPG	FG%	3P%	FT%	RPG	APG	SPG	BPG	PPG
Chennedy Carter	16	16	25.4	47.3	37.5	82.1	2.3	3.4	0.9	0.3	17.4
Betnijah Laney	22	22	33.3	48.1	40.5	82.7	4.9	4.0	1.6	0.1	17.2
Courtney Williams	20	14	30.5	43.6	23.5	69.6	7.2	3.2	0.7	0.1	14.6
Elizabeth Williams	22	22	29.2	48.9	0	74.2	5.7	1.4	0.8	1.4	10.1
Monique Billings	22	16	27.1	40.0	0	76.1	8.5	1.2	1.1	0.8	8.5
Shekinna Stricklen	22	15	21.7	34.1	33.3	100	1.9	0.6	0.3	0	6.1
Blake Dietrick	22	4	21.0	47.1	44.8	62.5	1.6	3.4	0.8	0.1	5.9
Glory Johnson	18	1	15.1	37.3	26.2	50.0	3.7	0.6	0.8	0.4	4.7
Kalani Brown	10	0	6.1	52.2	0	60.0	1.2	0	0.1	0.1	3.0
Jaylyn Agnew	12	0	5.9	26.7	23.1	80.0	0.4	0.3	0	0	1.3
Brittany Brewer	5	0	6.6	66.7	0	0	1.0	0	0.6	0.8	0.8
Kaela Davis	2	0	1.0	0	0	0	0	0	0	0	0

== Awards and honors ==
Recipient	Award	Date awarded	Ref.
Betnijah Laney	Most Improved Player	September 24	
Betnijah Laney	WNBA All-Defense 1st Team	September 29	
Chennedy Carter	All-Rookie Team	September 27	
Elizabeth Williams	WNBA All-Defense 1st Team	September 29	
