= Chennedy Carter =

American basketball player (born 1998)

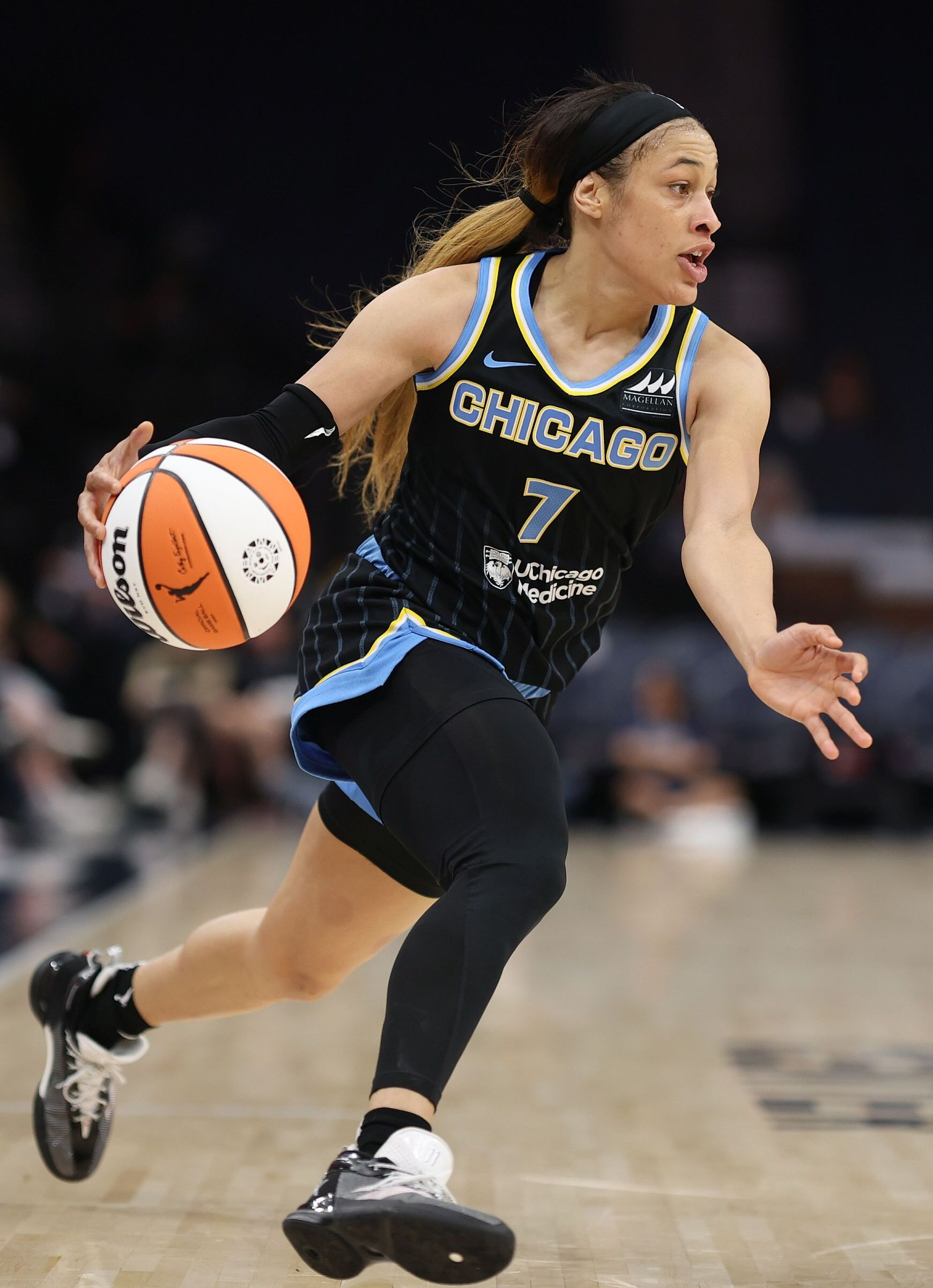
- Carter with the Chicago Sky in 2024

Free agent
- Position: Point guard

Personal information
- Born: November 14, 1998 (age 28) Fort Worth, Texas, U.S.
- Listed height: 5 ft 9 in (1.75 m)
- Listed weight: 143 lb (65 kg)

Career information
- High school: Timberview (Arlington, Texas)
- College: Texas A&M (2017–2020)
- WNBA draft: 2020: 1st round, 4th overall pick
- Drafted by: Atlanta Dream
- Playing career: 2020–present

Career history
- 2020–2021: Atlanta Dream
- 2020: Elazığ İl Özel İdarespor
- 2021: Maccabi Raanana
- 2022: AZS Poznań
- 2022: Los Angeles Sparks
- 2022–2023: Bursa Büyükşehir Belediyespor
- 2023: Heilongjiang Dragons
- 2024: Bursa Büyükşehir Belediyespor
- 2024: Chicago Sky
- 2024–2025: Wuhan Shengfan
- 2026: Las Vegas Aces

Career highlights
- WNBA All-Rookie Team (2020); 2× Second-team All-American – USBWA (2019, 2020); Second-team All-American – AP (2020); WBCA Coaches' All-American (2020); USBWA National Freshman of the Year (2018); WBCA Freshman of the Year (2018); 3× First-team All-SEC (2018–2020); SEC Freshman of the Year (2018); SEC All-Freshman Team (2018); McDonald's All-American (2017)
- Stats at Basketball Reference
Medals
Representing United States
Women's basketball
Pan American Games
Silver medal – second place	2019 Peru	Team
FIBA Under-19 World Cup
Silver medal – second place	2017 Italy	Team
FIBA Under-18 Americas Championship
Gold medal – first place	2016 Chile	Team

Chennedy Carter (/ˈkɛnədi/ KEN-ə-dee; born November 14, 1998) is an American professional basketball player who most recently played for the Las Vegas Aces of the Women's National Basketball Association (WNBA). She played college basketball for the Texas A&M Aggies. Carter was drafted fourth overall by the Atlanta Dream in the 2020 WNBA draft.

== Early life ==
Carter grew up in Mansfield, Texas, with three brothers. When she was in elementary school, she idolized Allen Iverson. Her father, Broderick, made her dribble a tennis ball in grass as a drill. "Me and my dad, we’d work out no matter what. Whether it was raining, snowing, pouring outside, it didn’t matter," she said. "He is my biggest supporter."

She graduated in 2017 from Timberview High School in Arlington, Texas, as a McDonald's All-American and the number six prospect in espnW’s HoopGurlz Top 100 with a 70–4 record over her junior and senior seasons. She was a member of the USA Basketball team that won gold in the summer of 2016 at the FIBA Americas U18 Championship in Valdivia, Chile. In November 2016, she signed a letter of intent with Texas A&M. Since high school, she has had the nickname "Hollywood".

== Professional career ==
Since she turned 22 in 2020, she was eligible for the 2020 WNBA draft. On March 29, Carter declared for the draft, forgoing her senior season. On April 17, she was drafted fourth overall by the Atlanta Dream. She became the highest drafted player in Texas A&M history.

“I came in here with a chip on my shoulder,” Carter said, "even with being picked fourth, and I feel like that chip has been there my entire life." When Carter joined Atlanta, Coach Nicki Collen said Carter was misunderstood. Collen said. "I think she wants to win and she wants to be the best, but I also think she felt a little bit overshadowed by (the number one drafted player University of Oregon and New York Liberty star) Sabrina Ionescu in the draft, and it's very hard in that scenario."

=== WNBA ===
==== 2020 ====
In her rookie season playing for the Atlanta Dream, she became the youngest player in WNBA history to score 30 points at 21 years and 266 days when she put up 35 against Seattle (8/6). She was considered the top candidate for the WNBA Rookie of the Year award until she sustained an ankle injury in the team's loss to the Connecticut Sun. Carter was sidelined for six games. She returned to the court on August 30 and scored 26 points in 26 minutes against Los Angeles. She scored at least 25 points on four occasions, becoming the fourth first-year player to score 25+ points in a game for Atlanta. At the end of the season, Carter was named to the 2020 WNBA All-Rookie Team.

==== 2021 ====
In July 2021, the Dream suspended Carter indefinitely for "conduct detrimental to the team". It was reported that before the suspension, Carter indicated she wanted to fight another Dream player who had asked her to improve her attitude during a game. Carter did not play again for the Dream after the suspension, and the team traded her to the Los Angeles Sparks for the 2022 season.

==== 2022 ====
In her season on the Sparks, Carter played in 24 games and started two of those. She averaged "8.9 points, 1.9 rebounds and 1.9 assists in 16.4 minutes per game" in that season. In March 2023, the Sparks waived Carter and were obligated to pay her protected $86,701 salary under the terms of the contract. The Los Angeles Times reported that Carter had been benched for "poor conduct" during the season. After Derek Fisher was fired as the team's head coach during the 2022 season, the interim coach, Fred Williams, did not play Carter for four games due to a "coach's decision".

==== 2023 ====
Carter did not play in the WNBA in the 2023 season.

==== 2024 ====
On June 1, 2024, during a game against the Indiana Fever, Carter was involved in a highly publicized incident when she committed an off-the-ball foul against rookie guard Caitlin Clark, knocking her to the floor. Initially ruled a common foul on the court, the WNBA upgraded the play to a Flagrant 1 foul upon league review the following day. The incident drew significant national media attention and sparked widespread debate regarding the level of physicality and rookie treatment within the league.

Carter finished the 2024 season as the Chicago Sky's leading scorer, averaging 17.5 points, 3.5 rebounds, and 3.1 assists per game under head coach Teresa Weatherspoon. However, the Sky chose not to extend her a qualifying offer, making her an unrestricted free agent due to reported locker room concerns and a shifting roster direction under a new coaching staff.

==== 2025 ====
Carter did not play in the WNBA in the 2025 season, instead playing for the Mexican team Adelitas de Chihuahua and the Chinese team Wuhan Shengfan.

==== 2026 ====
On April 15, 2026, Carter signed a training camp contract with the Las Vegas Aces. On July 7, 2026, she was waived by the Aces. Prior to being waived, she appeared in 13 of the Aces' 21 games and averaged 12.2 points per game.

=== Overseas ===
In August 2020, she agreed to terms with Turkey's Elazığ İl Özel İdarespor for her first overseas season. She left the team early because she was homesick.

In 2023 she played for Bursa in Turkey. She also played in the WCBA for Heilongjiang and was the league's leading scorer averaging 28.9 PPG and had her highest points in a single game with 51 points.

Carter signed with Wuhan Shengfan of the Women's Chinese Basketball Association for the 2024–2025 season. She's currently the league's leading scorer for the 2024–2025 season and has 31.4 PPG with a season high of 44 points in a single game. Her highest points in a single game was in 2023 on November 20, when she scored 51 points, which is second behind Maya Moore who has the league's highest at 60 points in a single game.

On January 20, 2025, Carter became the first player in the 2024–2025 season to record a triple double for the WCBA with a 33 PTS, 17 REB, 10 AST, 5 STL, 1 BLK performance and a win over Hefei. The score was 85–69.

== Career statistics ==
Legend
GP	Games played	GS	Games started	MPG	Minutes per game	RPG	Rebounds per game
APG	Assists per game	SPG	Steals per game	BPG	Blocks per game	PPG	Points per game
TO	Turnovers per game	FG%	Field-goal percentage	3P%	3-point field-goal percentage	FT%	Free-throw percentage
**Bold**	Career best	°	League leader

=== WNBA ===
WNBA regular season statistics
Year	Team	GP	GS	MPG	FG%	3P%	FT%	RPG	APG	SPG	BPG	TO	PPG
2020	Atlanta	16	16	25.4	.473	.375	.821	2.3	**3.4**	.9	.3	2.7	17.4
2021	Atlanta	11	11	25.5	.455	.111	**.875**	1.3	3.3	.7	**.4**	2.1	14.2
2022	Los Angeles	24	2	16.4	.450	.200	.745	1.9	1.9	.6	**.4**	1.8	8.9
2024	Chicago	**33**	**20**	**26.0**	.487	.290	.730	**3.5**	3.1	**1.1**	.2	1.7	**17.5**
2026	Las Vegas	13	0	16.9	**.600**	**.524**	.757	1.8	1.3	.8	.3	**1.3**	12.2
**Career**	5 years, 4 teams	97	49	22.2	.484	.340	.772	2.4	2.6	.9	.3	1.9	14.3

=== College ===
NCAA statistics
Year	Team	GP	FG%	3P%	FT%	RBG	APG	BPG	SPG	PPG
2017–18	Texas A&M	**36**	.443	**.383**	**.791**	3.6	**4.9**	.1	**1.9**	22.7
2018–19	Texas A&M	29	.403	.352	.717	**4.8**	3.5	**.2**	1.5	**23.3**
2019–20	Texas A&M	23	**.452**	.253	.729	4.3	3.5	**.2**	1.7	21.4
**Career**		88	.431	.346	.748	4.2	4.1	.2	1.7	22.5

Totals
Year	Team	GP	FG	FGA	3P	3PA	FT	FTA	REB	A	BK	ST	PTS
2017-18	Texas A&M	**36**	**298**	**673**	**69**	**180**	**151**	**191**	131	**177**	5	**68**	**816**
2018-19	Texas A&M	29	238	591	58	165	142	198	**138**	100	**7**	42	676
2019-20	Texas A&M	23	196	434	21	83	78	107	99	80	4	39	491
**Career**		88	732	1698	148	428	371	496	368	357	16	149	1983
