= Kristine Anigwe =

Professional basketball player (born 1997)

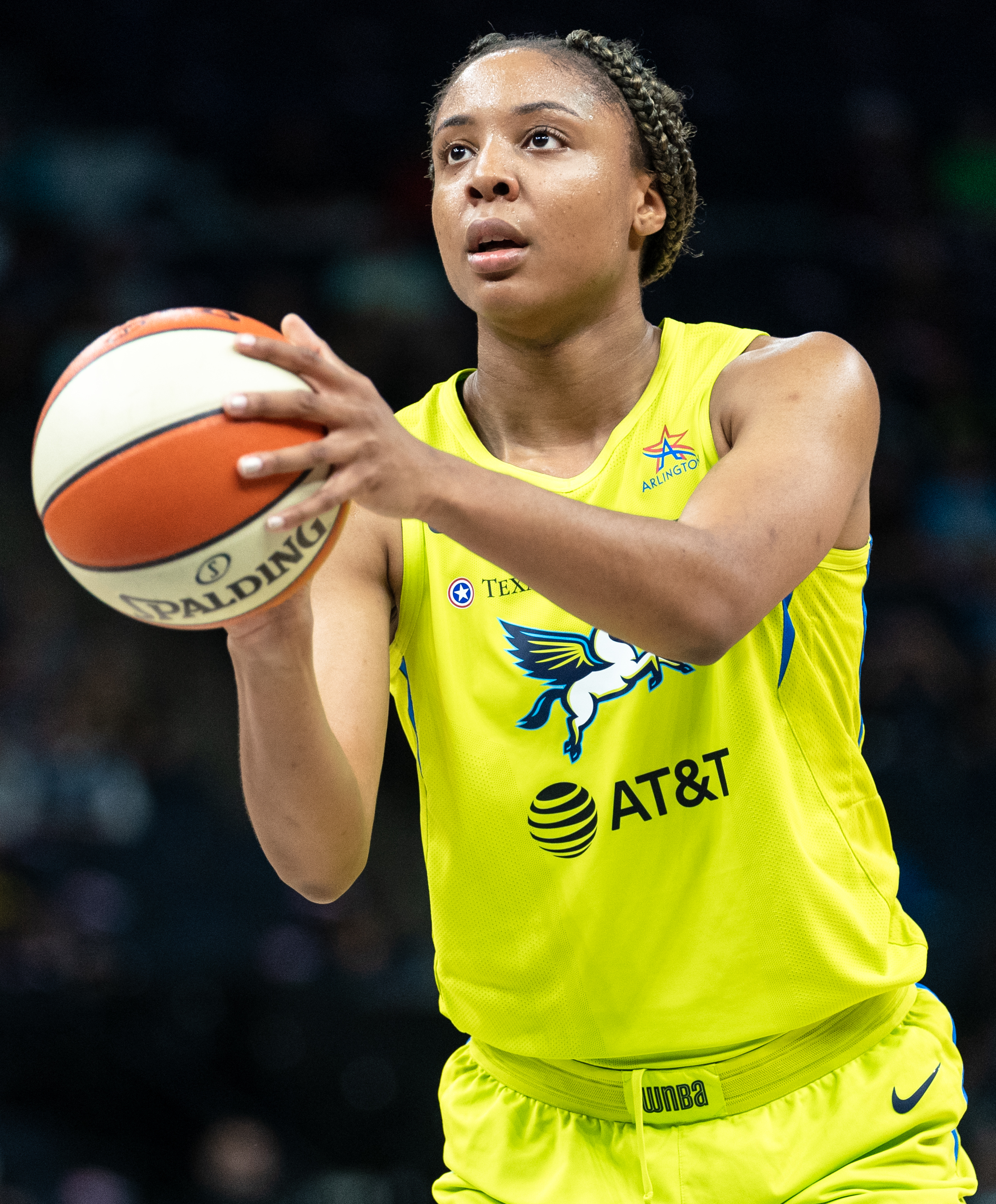
- Anigwe in 2019

Free Agent
- Position: Center / power forward
- League: WNBA

Personal information
- Born: March 31, 1997 (age 29) London, England
- Listed height: 6 ft 4 in (1.93 m)
- Listed weight: 200 lb (91 kg)

Career information
- High school: Desert Vista (Phoenix, Arizona)
- College: California (2015–2019)
- WNBA draft: 2019: 1st round, 9th overall pick
- Drafted by: Connecticut Sun
- Playing career: 2019–present

Career history
- 2019: Connecticut Sun
- 2019: Dallas Wings
- 2019–2020: İzmit Belediyespor
- 2020: Los Angeles Sparks
- 2020–2022: Çukurova Basketbol
- 2021: Dallas Wings
- 2021: Los Angeles Sparks
- 2022: Phoenix Mercury
- 2022–2023: Virtus Eirene Ragusa
- 2023: Chicago Sky
- 2023: Connecticut Sun
- 2023–present: SERCO UNI Győr

Career highlights
- Naismith Defensive Player of the Year (2019); Second-team All-American – AP, USBWA (2019); Pac-12 Defensive Player of the Year (2019); 4x All Pac-12 (2016–2019); 2x Pac-12 All-Defensive Team (2017, 2019); USBWA National Freshman of the Year (2016); Pac-12 Freshman of the Year (2016); Pac-12 All-Freshman Team (2016); McDonald's All-American (2015)
- Stats at Basketball Reference
Medals
Women's basketball
Representing the United States
FIBA Under-19 World Cup
Gold medal – first place	2015 Russia	Team
FIBA Under-17 World Cup
Gold medal – first place	2014 Czech Republic	Team
Women's 3x3 basketball
Representing the United States
FIBA 3x3 Under-18 World Cup
Silver medal – second place	2015 Hungary	Team

Kristine Chioma Anigwe (born March 31, 1997) is an American professional basketball player for SERCO UNI Győr in the EuroLeague.

== Early life ==
Kristine Anigwe was born in London to Nigerian parents. She and her siblings were raised in Phoenix, Arizona, and attended Desert Vista High School. At age 17, Anigwe became a U.S. citizen in June 2014.

In her upperclassman years, Anigwe won two consecutive FIBA age group World Championships competing for the United States, first with the under-17s in 2014 and then with the under-19s in 2015. Anigwe scored in double figures in all 27 games for Desert Vista in her senior season, leading the state with 21.1 points and 13.3 rebounds per game and registering 17 double-doubles.

== College career ==
Before her junior year of high school, Anigwe accepted an offer to play college basketball at the University of California, Berkeley, where she would major in sociology.

=== Freshman season ===
In her first season with California in 2015–16, Anigwe won eight consecutive Pac-12 Conference Freshman of the Week honors. She led the Golden Bears in points, rebounds, field goal percentage, field goals made, blocks, free throws made, and free throw attempts. Anigwe was voted to the 2016 Pac-12 Conference women's basketball tournament All-Tournament Team, and she was named the women's USBWA National Freshman of the Year following the season.

=== Sophomore season ===
Anigwe's success continued as a sophomore, as she became the first player in California history to average 20 points per game in consecutive seasons. On December 8, 2016, Anigwe recorded the first 50-point game in Golden Bears history, scoring 50 in only 24 minutes against Sacramento State. A month later, on January 8, she became the fastest player in Pac-12 history to reach 1,000 points, hitting the milestone in a loss to eventual Elite Eight participant Oregon. Anigwe continued to lead the Golden Bears in points and rebounds, also leading in field goal percentage and blocks.

For the second consecutive year, Anigwe was named to the Pac-12 All-Tournament Team. Anigwe saw her first NCAA tournament action, in which the Golden Bears narrowly defeated LSU before falling to No. 1 seed Baylor.

=== Junior season ===
Anigwe registered 28 points and 25 rebounds in a win against Brown on November 19, 2017, achieving the first 25–25 game in Division I women's basketball in three years.

For the third consecutive season, Anigwe led California in points and rebounds as a junior, and was named to the All-Pac-12 Team. She was also a late season nominee for the 2018 Wade Trophy, John R. Wooden Award, Naismith College Player of the Year, and Katrina McClain Awards. California were upset in the first round of the 2018 NCAA tournament by Virginia.

=== Senior season ===
As a senior in 2018–19, Anigwe posted career highs in points (22.3) and rebounds per game (16.2), leading the country in rebounds. She became the third California Golden Bear to score 2,000 career points on December 2, 2018, in a win against Cal State Northridge.

Anigwe set multiple school and conference records during her senior season. On February 8 and 10, 2019, Anigwe broke California's scoring and rebounding records in consecutive home losses to Oregon State and Oregon.

In her final regular-season college game on March 3, 2019, at Washington State, Anigwe scored 32 points and added 30 rebounds. In doing so, she both set the Pac-12 women's rebounding record, and became the first Division I player since 2002 to record 30 points and rebounds in a single game.

Anigwe and California received an at-large bid to the 2019 NCAA tournament, in which they defeated North Carolina before falling to eventual national champions Baylor.

Following the season, Anigwe was named the Naismith Defensive Player of the Year.

=== California statistics ===
Legend
GP	Games played	GS	Games started	MPG	Minutes per game
FG%	Field goal percentage	3P%	3-point field goal percentage	FT%	Free throw percentage
RPG	Rebounds per game	APG	Assists per game	SPG	Steals per game
BPG	Blocks per game	PPG	Points per game	**Bold**	Career high

Year	Team	GP	Points	FG%	3P%	FT%	RPG	APG	SPG	BPG	PPG
2015-16	California	31	635	57.0%	0.0%	75.4%	9.3	0.6	**1.1**	1.2	20.5
2016-17	California	**34**	714	56.6%	33.3%	**68.1%**	9.3	0.9	0.7	**2.1**	21.0
2017-18	California	30	500	**56.9%**	**54.5%**	58.3%	8.8	0.9	1.0	1.3	16.7
2018-19	California	33	**742**	50.8%	30.4%	65.6%	**16.2**	**1.0**	1.0	1.7	**22.5**
Career		128	2591	55.0%	36.8%	67.8%	11.0	0.9	0.9	1.6	20.2

== Professional career ==
Anigwe was selected ninth overall in the 2019 WNBA draft by the Connecticut Sun.

On August 6, 2019, Anigwe was traded to the Dallas Wings in exchange for Theresa Plaisance.

On May 26, 2020, Anigwe was traded to the Los Angeles Sparks in exchange for a second-round 2021 draft pick.

After spending time with both the Wings and Sparks in 2021, Anigwe was signed by her hometown Phoenix Mercury ahead of the 2022 WNBA season.

On July 3, 2023, Anigwe was waived from the Chicago Sky after Ruthy Hebard was activated from the Inactive/Pregnancy List.

Anigwe joined the Connecticut Sun in July 2023 after being waived by the Sky. She signed a 7-Day Contract with the Sun. She was brought back on a 2nd 7-Day Contract with the Sun in August 2023. She signed a second 7-Day Contract with the Sun in August 2023.

== WNBA career statistics ==
Legend
GP	Games played	GS	Games started	MPG	Minutes per game	RPG	Rebounds per game
APG	Assists per game	SPG	Steals per game	BPG	Blocks per game	PPG	Points per game
TO	Turnovers per game	FG%	Field-goal percentage	3P%	3-point field-goal percentage	FT%	Free-throw percentage
**Bold**	Career best	°	League leader

=== Regular season ===
Year	Team	GP	GS	MPG	FG%	3P%	FT%	RPG	APG	SPG	BPG	TO	PPG
2019	Connecticut	17	0	7.1	.314	.000	**.706**	1.8	0.2	0.4	0.2	0.6	2.0
2019	Dallas	10	0	12.9	.333	.000	.667	3.6	0.3	0.3	0.4	0.7	3.2
2020	Los Angeles	**17**	**1**	11.6	**.604**	.000	.538	2.6	0.2	**0.6**	0.4	0.9	**4.6**
2021	Dallas	3	0	10.0	.500	.000	.500	2.0	0.0	0.3	0.0	0.7	2.3
2021	Los Angeles	7	**1**	**15.1**	.391	.000	.563	**3.9**	**0.7**	**0.6**	0.1	1.4	3.9
2022	Phoenix	10	1	6.5	.500	.000	.500	1.3	0.2	0.1	0.2	0.6	1.5
2023	Connecticut	10	0	8.3	.455	.000	.625	2.1	0.4	0.3	**0.5**	0.6	2.5
2023	Chicago	3	0	2.0	.000	.000	.000	0.3	0.0	0.0	0.0	**0.3**	0.0
Career	5 years, 5 teams	77	3	9.6	.440	.000	.596	2.3	0.3	0.4	0.3	0.8	2.8

=== Postseason ===
Year	Team	GP	GS	MPG	FG%	3P%	FT%	RPG	APG	SPG	BPG	TO	PPG
2020	Los Angeles	1	1	18.0	.600	.000	1.000	7.0	0.0	0.0	1.0	1.0	8.0
Career	1 year, 1 team	1	1	18.0	.600	.000	1.000	7.0	0.0	0.0	1.0	1.0	8.0
