= Stephanie Mavunga =

American basketball player (born 1995)

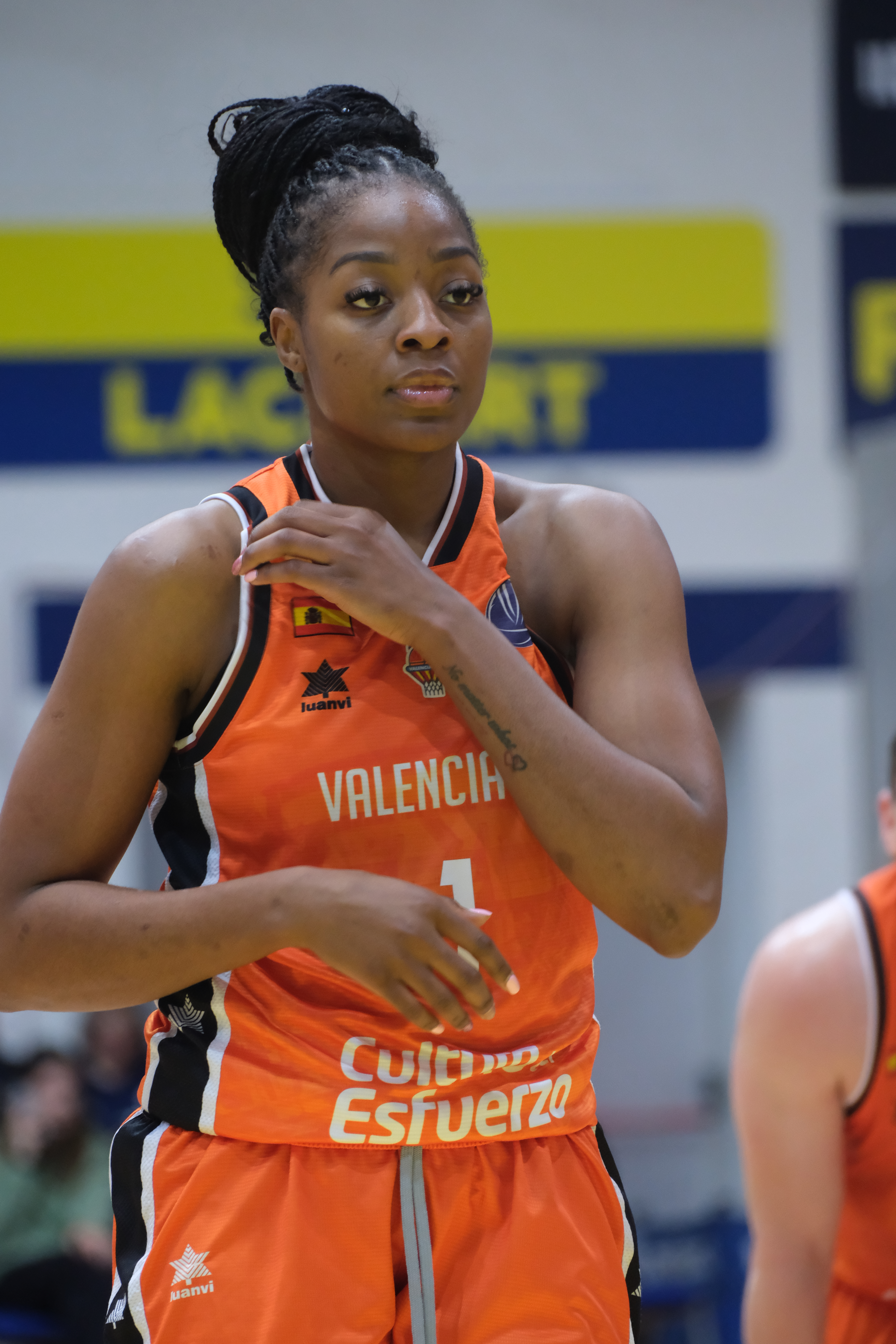
- Mavunga with Valencia Basket in 2025

Emlak Konut
- Position: Power forward
- League: Women's Basketball Super League

Personal information
- Born: February 24, 1995 (age 31) Harare, Zimbabwe
- Listed height: 6 ft 3 in (1.91 m)
- Listed weight: 205 lb (93 kg)

Career information
- High school: Brownsburg (Brownsburg, Indiana)
- College: North Carolina (2013–2015); Ohio State (2016–2018)
- WNBA draft: 2018: 2nd round, 14th overall pick
- Drafted by: Indiana Fever
- Playing career: 2018–present

Career history
- 2018–2020: Indiana Fever
- 2018–2019: BC Enisey
- 2019–2020: BLMA
- 2020: Chicago Sky
- 2020–2021: Dynamo Kursk
- 2021–2022: KGHM BC Polkowice
- 2022: Washington Mystics
- 2022–2024: KGHM BC Polkowice
- 2024: Çukurova Basketbol
- 2024–2025: Valencia Basket
- 2025–2026: Reyer Venezia
- 2026–present: Emlak Konut

Career highlights
- First-team All-Big Ten (2018); Second-team All-Big Ten (2017); First-team All-ACC (2015); McDonald's All-American (2013)
- Stats at WNBA.com
- Stats at Basketball Reference
Medals
Women's basketball
Representing the United States
Pan American Games
Silver medal – second place	2015 Toronto	Team
FIBA Americas Under-16 Championship
Gold medal – first place	2011 Mexico	Team

Stephanie Mavunga (born February 24, 1995) is an American and Polish professional basketball player who plays for Emlak Konut. She was drafted by Indiana in the second round and 14th overall pick of the 2018 draft, becoming the first Zimbabwean-born player to be drafted by the WNBA. She switched her international allegiance to Poland in 2022.

== College career ==
Mavunga began her college career at North Carolina. In her rookie season, she made 34 starts and played in 37 games for the Tar Heels. She averaged 10.7 points and a team-leading 8.2 rebounds and 2.4 blocks per game. In her sophomore season, she was named First Team All-ACC and to the Preseason All-ACC team. Despite ranking 2nd in the ACC in double doubles that season, she decided to transfer to Ohio State. Mavunga sat out the 2015–16 season under NCAA Transfer rules. In her junior season, she made 22 appearances for the Buckeyes, and averaged 11.4 points per game and 10.8 rebounds per game. She became the third player in Ohio State history to average a double double. Her senior season was another success, as she was named to the All-Big Ten team and the All-Big Ten Tournament team.

=== North Carolina and Ohio State statistics ===
Legend
GP	Games played	GS	Games started	MPG	Minutes per game
FG%	Field goal percentage	3P%	3-point field goal percentage	FT%	Free throw percentage
RPG	Rebounds per game	APG	Assists per game	SPG	Steals per game
BPG	Blocks per game	PPG	Points per game	**Bold**	Career high

Year	Team	GP	Points	FG%	3P%	FT%	RPG	APG	SPG	BPG	PPG
2013–14	North Carolina	**37**	396	52.3%	7.7%	58.9%	8.2	1.1	1.1	2.4	10.7
2014–15	North Carolina	35	504	48.3%	14.3%	64.1%	9.6	**1.6**	**1.4**	**2.6**	14.4
2015–16	Ohio State	Sat due to NCAA transfer rules									
2016–17	Ohio State	22	251	56.8%	0.0%	**68.0%**	10.8	0.5	0.6	2.2	11.4
2017–18	Ohio State	35	**582**	**63.2%**	**33.3%**	67.8%	**11.0**	0.6	1.1	2.5	**16.6**
Career		129	1733	54.8%	12.9%	64.5%	9.8	1.0	1.1	2.5	13.4

== WNBA career ==
Mavunga was drafted 14th overall in the 2018 WNBA draft by the Indiana Fever. She played in 25 games for the Fever, averaging 2.2 points per game and 2.2 rebounds per game over the season. She did not start any games during the 2018 season.

On August 28, 2020, Mavunga was traded to the Chicago Sky for Jantel Lavender as well as second- and third-round draft picks in the 2021 WNBA Draft.

== WNBA career statistics ==
Legend
GP	Games played	GS	Games started	MPG	Minutes per game	RPG	Rebounds per game
APG	Assists per game	SPG	Steals per game	BPG	Blocks per game	PPG	Points per game
TO	Turnovers per game	FG%	Field-goal percentage	3P%	3-point field-goal percentage	FT%	Free-throw percentage
**Bold**	Career best	°	League leader

=== Regular season ===
Year	Team	GP	GS	MPG	FG%	3P%	FT%	RPG	APG	SPG	BPG	TO	PPG
2018	Indiana	**25**	0	7.8	.477	.000	.800	2.2	0.2	**0.3**	0.2	0.4	2.2
2019	Indiana	24	0	8.5	**.511**	.000	.706	2.3	0.2	**0.3**	0.3	0.4	2.5
2020	Indiana	5	0	**11.8**	.444	.000	**.818**	**4.0**	**0.6**	0.0	**0.4**	1.0	**5.0**
2020	Chicago	5	0	7.2	.455	.000	.000	2.6	0.4	0.2	0.0	1.2	2.0
Career	3 years, 2 teams	59	0	8.4	.483	.000	.767	2.5	0.2	0.3	0.3	0.5	2.5

=== Playoffs ===
Year	Team	GP	GS	MPG	FG%	3P%	FT%	RPG	APG	SPG	BPG	TO	PPG
2020	Chicago	1	0	1.0	.000	.000	.000	0.0	0.0	0.0	0.0	1.0	0.0
Career	1 year, 1 team	1	0	1.0	.000	.000	.000	0.0	0.0	0.0	0.0	1.0	0.0
