= 2020 Los Angeles Sparks season =

- Head coach: Derek Fisher
- Arena: Originally: Staples Center; Rescheduled to play at the: IMG Academy, in Bradenton, Florida

Results
- Record: 15–7 (.682)
- Place: 3rd (Western)
- Playoff finish: 3rd Seed, lost in the 2nd Round #7 Connecticut Sun, L 73-59

Media
- Television: Spectrum SportsNet; ESPN2, CBSSN, NBATV

The 2020 Los Angeles Sparks season was the 24th season for the Los Angeles Sparks of the Women's National Basketball Association. The season tipped off on July 25, 2020, versus the Phoenix Mercury.

This WNBA season was set to feature an all-time high 36 regular-season games. However, the plan for expanded games was put on hold on April 3, when the WNBA postponed its season due to the COVID-19 pandemic. Under a plan approved on June 15, the league is scheduled to hold a shortened 22-game regular season at IMG Academy, without fans present, starting on July 24.

The Sparks' season started slowly, with the team going 3–3 in their first six games. Every win was followed by a loss during that streak. Then the team warmed up and won nine games in a row, before losing the last game in August to go into the final month of the season 12–4, and already having secured a playoff berth. September was not kind to the Sparks, as they went 3–3 to finish out the season. Their final record of 15–7 was good enough for the third seed in the playoffs.

As the third seed, the Sparks were awarded a First Round bye and awaited the lowest remaining seed in the second round. They played the seventh seeded Connecticut Sun and suffered a disappointing 59–73 loss to end their season.

== Transactions ==
=== WNBA draft ===
Round	Pick	Player	Nationality	School/team/country
2	20	Beatrice Mompremier	United States	Miami (FL)
2	22	Leonie Fiebich	Germany	Wasserburg (Germany)
3	34	Tynice Martin	United States	West Virginia

=== Trades/roster changes ===
Date	Details
February 10, 2020	Signed G Kristi Toliver
February 10, 2020	Traded C Kalani Brown to the Atlanta Dream in exchange for G Brittney Sykes and C Marie Gülich
February 11, 2020	Re-signed G/F Tierra Ruffin-Pratt
February 20, 2020	Signed G/F Seimone Augustus
February 21, 2020	Traded G Marina Mabrey to Dallas in exchange for Dallas' Second round pick in the 2021 WNBA draft
February 28, 2020	Re-signed G Chelsea Gray
May 15, 2020	Signed G Sydney Wiese to a contract extension.
May 26, 2020	Traded the second round pick acquired in the February 21st trade to Dallas in exchange for C Kristine Anigwe and a third round pick in the 2021 Draft.
June 26, 2020	G Kristi Toliver opts out of the 2020 season.
June 26, 2020	F/C Chiney Ogwumike opts out of the 2020 season.
June 27, 2020	Signed F Reshanda Gray.
June 28, 2020	Signed G Te'a Cooper.

== Roster ==
2020 Los Angeles Sparks roster
Players
Coaches

Pos.	No.	Nat.	Name	Height	Weight	DOB	From	Yrs
F	31	(United Kingdom)	Anigwe, Kristine	6' 4" (1.93m)	200 lb (91kg)	1997-03-31	California	1
G/F	33	(United States)	Augustus, Seimone	6' 0" (1.83m)	174 lb (79kg)	1984-04-30	LSU	14
G	4	(United States)	Cooper, Te'a	5' 8" (1.73m)	160 lb (73kg)	1997-04-16	Baylor	R
G	12	(United States)	Gray, Chelsea	5' 11" (1.8m)	170 lb (77kg)	1992-10-08	Duke	5
F	1	(United States)	Gray, Reshanda	6' 2" (1.88m)	192 lb (87kg)	1993-06-01	California	3
C	24	(Germany)	Gülich, Marie	6' 5" (1.96m)	205 lb (93kg)	1994-05-28	Oregon State	2
F	30	(United States)	Ogwumike, Nneka	6' 2" (1.88m)	174 lb (79kg)	1990-07-02	Stanford	8
F/C	3	(United States)	Parker, Candace	6' 4" (1.93m)	175 lb (79kg)	1986-04-19	Tennessee	12
G	10	(United States)	Ruffin-Pratt, Tierra	5' 11" (1.8m)	180 lb (82kg)	1991-04-11	North Carolina	7
G	15	(United States)	Sykes, Brittney	5' 9" (1.75m)	154 lb (70kg)	1994-02-07	Syracuse	3
G	24	(United States)	Wiese, Sydney	6' 0" (1.83m)	165 lb (75kg)	1995-06-16	Oregon State	3
G	2	(United States)	Williams, Riquna	5' 7" (1.7m)	165 lb (75kg)	1990-05-28	Miami (FL)	7

Head coach
(United States) Derek Fisher (Little Rock)
Assistant coaches
(United States) Latricia Trammell (East Central)
(United States) Fred Williams (Boise State)
Athletic trainer
(United States) Courtney Watson (California)
Strength and conditioning coach
(United States) Kelly Dormandy (Quinnipiac)

Legend

- (C) Team captain
- (DP) Unsigned draft pick
- (FA) Free agent
- (S) Suspended
- Injured

== Game log ==
=== Regular season ===
2020 game log
Total: 15–7
July

Game	Date	Team	Score	High points	High rebounds	High assists	Location Attendance	Record
1	July 25	Phoenix Mercury	W 99–76	N. Ogwumike (21)	Tied (7)	Gray (7)	IMG Academy; 0	1–0
2	July 28	Chicago Sky	78–96	Sykes (16)	Parker (9)	Gray (7)	IMG Academy; 0	1–1
3	July 30	Connecticut Sun	W 81–76	Gray (15)	Parker (11)	Gray (6)	IMG Academy; 0	2–1

August

Game	Date	Team	Score	High points	High rebounds	High assists	Location Attendance	Record
4	August 1	Seattle Storm	L 75–81	Parker (19)	Parker (12)	Gray (5)	IMG Academy; 0	2–2
5	August 5	Indiana Fever	W 86–75	Parker (18)	Parker (11)	Gray (5)	IMG Academy; 0	3–2
6	August 7	Las Vegas Aces	L 82–86	Parker (20)	Parker (12)	Tied (4)	IMG Academy; 0	3–3
7	August 9	Minnesota Lynx	W 97–81	Williams (21)	Parker (10)	Parker (9)	IMG Academy; 0	4–3
8	August 11	New York Liberty	W 93–78	Tied (17)	Parker (6)	Tied (4)	IMG Academy; 0	5-3
9	August 13	Washington Mystics	W 81-64	Williams (13)	Parker (9)	Tied (3)	IMG Academy; 0	6-3
10	August 15	Indiana Fever	W 90-76	Williams (21)	Tied (5)	Tied (5)	IMG Academy; 0	7-3
11	August 19	Phoenix Mercury	W 83–74	3 tied (16)	Parker (12)	Gray (6)	IMG Academy; 0	8–3
12	August 21	Atlanta Dream	92-85 (OT)	Gray (20)	Parker (9)	Parker (5)	IMG Academy; 0	9-3
13	August 23	Dallas Wings	W 84-81	Sykes (23)	Parker (14)	Parker (6)	IMG Academy; 0	10-3
14	August 28	Connecticut Sun	W 80-76	Gray (27)	Cooper (6)	Parker (7)	IMG Academy; 0	11-3
15	August 30	Atlanta Dream	W 84–79	Sykes (15)	Parker (10)	Parker (7)	IMG Academy; 0	12–3
16	August 31	Minnesota Lynx	L 78–96	Gray (18)	Parker (9)	Gray (5)	IMG Academy; 0	12–4

September

Game	Date	Team	Score	High points	High rebounds	High assists	Location Attendance	Record
17	September 2	Dallas Wings	W 91–83	Parker (22)	Parker (10)	Parker (6)	IMG Academy; 0	13-4
18	September 4	Seattle Storm	L 90–89	Parker (25)	Parker (7)	Parker; Gray (6)	IMG Academy; 0	13-5
19	September 6	Chicago Sky	W 86–80	Parker (24)	Parker (15)	Gray (7)	IMG Academy; 0	14-5
20	September 8	New York Liberty	W 96–70	Tied (20)	N.Ogwumike (8)	Parker (7)	IMG Academy; 0	15-5
21	September 10	Washington Mystics	L 72–80	Gray (21)	Parker (17)	Parker (6)	IMG Academy; 0	15–6
22	September 12	Las Vegas Aces	L 70–84	N.Ogwumike (24)	Parker (10)	Gray (11)	IMG Academy; 0	15–7

2020 season schedule

=== Playoffs ===
2020 playoff game log
Total: 0–1
Second Round

Game	Date	Team	Score	High points	High rebounds	High assists	Location Attendance	Series
1	September 17	Connecticut Sun	L 73–59	Parker (22)	Parker (14)	Parker (5)	IMG Academy; 0	0–1

2020 playoff schedule

== Standings ==
#	Team	W	L	PCT	GB	Conf.
1	x – Las Vegas Aces	18	4	.818	–	8–2
2	x – Seattle Storm	18	4	.818	–	8–2
3	x – Los Angeles Sparks	15	7	.682	3	5–5
4	x – Minnesota Lynx	14	8	.636	4	4–6
5	x – Phoenix Mercury	13	9	.591	5	4–6
6	x – Chicago Sky	12	10	.545	6	6–4
7	x – Connecticut Sun	10	12	.455	8	7–3
8	x – Washington Mystics	9	13	.409	9	6–4
9	e – Dallas Wings	8	14	.364	10	1–9
10	e – Atlanta Dream	7	15	.318	11	5–5
11	e – Indiana Fever	6	16	.273	12	4–6
12	e – New York Liberty	2	20	.091	16	2–8

== Playoffs ==
**First round** Single elimination (September 15)
5	**Phoenix Mercury**	**85**
8	Washington Mystics	84
6	Chicago Sky	81
7	**Connecticut Sun**	**94**

**Second round** Single elimination (September 17)
4	**Minnesota Lynx**	**80**
5	Phoenix Mercury	79
3	Los Angeles Sparks	59
7	**Connecticut Sun**	**73**

**Semifinals**; Best-of-5 (September 20–29)
1	**Las Vegas Aces**	**3**
7	Connecticut Sun	2
2	**Seattle Storm**	**3**
4	Minnesota Lynx	0

**WNBA Finals**; Best-of-5 (October 2–11)
1	Las Vegas Aces	0
2	**Seattle Storm**	**3**

Note: Teams re-seeded after each round.

- **Bold** – Game or series winner

== Statistics ==
Legend
GP	Games played	GS	Games started	MPG	Minutes per game	RPG	Rebounds per game
APG	Assists per game	SPG	Steals per game	BPG	Blocks per game	PPG	Points per game
FG%	Field-goal percentage	3P%	3-point field-goal percentage	FT%	Free-throw percentage	TO	Turnovers per game
PF	Fouls per game		Team leader		League leader

=== Regular season ===
Player	GP	GS	MPG	FG%	3P%	FT%	RPG	APG	SPG	BPG	PPG
Candace Parker	22	22	30.0	51.0	39.6	73.1	9.7	4.6	1.2	1.2	14.7
Chelsea Gray	22	22	30.6	44.2	30.5	93.9	3.7	5.3	1.5	0.1	14.0
Nneka Ogwumike	18	18	26.2	56.9	50.0	83.7	4.8	1.7	1.1	0.2	13.3
Riquna Williams	21	4	21.1	43.5	42.2	88.9	1.8	1.5	1.1	0.3	10.5
Brittney Sykes	21	14	24.4	48.7	32.7	80.6	2.6	2.1	1.5	0.3	10.1
Te'a Cooper	20	3	17.3	45.1	34.4	76.5	1.0	2.0	0.7	0	7.0
Sydney Wiese	19	15	19.1	50.5	47.2	91.7	1.7	1.2	0.6	0.1	6.8
Seimone Augustus	21	0	15.8	49.1	54.5	66.7	1.8	1.2	0.6	0.1	5.9
Kristine Anigwe	17	1	11.6	60.4	0	53.8	2.6	0.2	0.6	0.4	4.6
Tierra Ruffin-Pratt	17	10	14.5	26.7	46.2	73.1	2.1	0.9	0.6	0.2	2.9
Marie Gülich	12	1	9.9	50.0	0	100.0	1.5	0.6	0.3	0.3	2.4
Reshanda Gray	10	0	6.3	36.4	0	85.7	2.8	0.3	0.1	0.4	1.4

== Awards and honors ==
Recipient	Award	Date awarded	Ref.
Candace Parker	WNBA Western Conference Player of the Week	August 24, 2020	
Candace Parker	Peak Performer: Rebounds	September 14, 2020	
Candace Parker	Defensive Player of the Year	September 24, 2020	
Nneka Ogwumike	Kim Perrot Sportsmanship Award	September 29, 2020	
Brittney Sykes	2nd Team All-Defense	September 29, 2020	
Candace Parker	All-WNBA First Team	October 4, 2020	
