= Brittney Sykes =

American basketball player (born 1994)

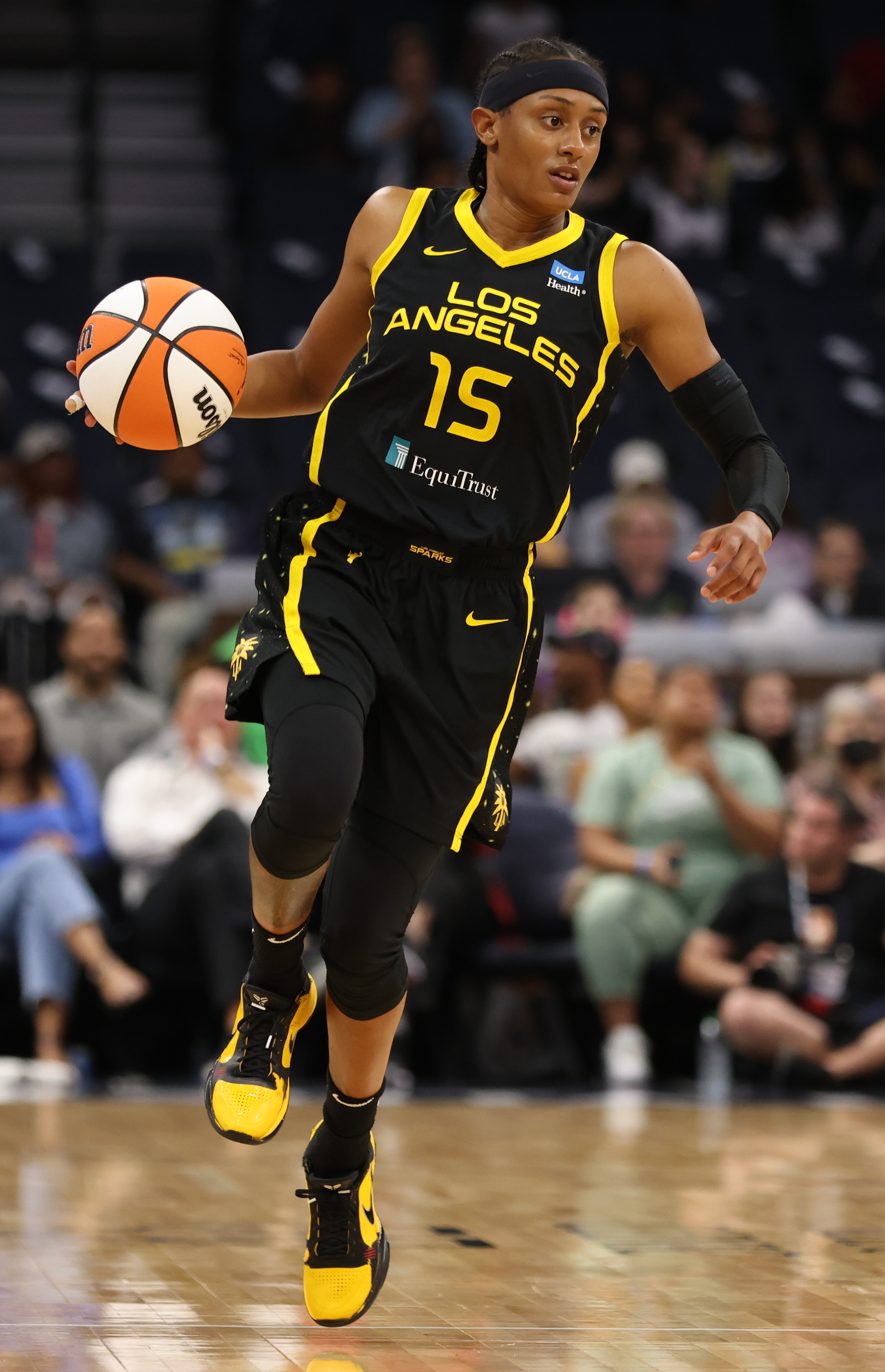

No. 20 – Toronto Tempo
- Position: Guard
- League: WNBA

Personal information
- Born: February 7, 1994 (age 32) Newark, New Jersey, U.S.
- Listed height: 5 ft 11 in (1.80 m)
- Listed weight: 152 lb (69 kg)

Career information
- High school: University (Newark, New Jersey)
- College: Syracuse (2012–2017)
- WNBA draft: 2017: 1st round, 7th overall pick
- Drafted by: Atlanta Dream
- Playing career: 2017–present

Career history
- 2017–2019: Atlanta Dream
- 2017: Hapoel Petah Tikva
- 2018: OGM Ormanspor
- 2019: Uni Girona CB
- 2020: Çukurova Basketbol
- 2020–2021: OGM Ormanspor
- 2020–2022: Los Angeles Sparks
- 2021–2022: Canberra Capitals
- 2022: Sopron Basket
- 2022–2023: Uni Girona CB
- 2023–2024: Polkowice
- 2023–2025: Washington Mystics
- 2025: Rose BC
- 2025–2026: Seattle Storm
- 2026–present: Laces BC
- 2026–present: Toronto Tempo

Career highlights
- WNBA All-Star (2025); WNBL Defensive Player of the Year (2022); All-WNBL First Team (2022); 2× WNBA All-Defensive First Team (2021, 2023); 2× WNBA All-Defensive Second Team (2020, 2022); 2× WNBA steals leader (2021, 2022); WNBA All-Rookie Team (2017); Unrivaled champion (2025); First-team All-ACC (2017); ACC All-Defensive Team (2017); Big East All-Freshman Team (2013); McDonald's All-American (2012)
- Stats at WNBA.com
- Stats at Basketball Reference
Medals
Women's 3x3 basketball
Representing the United States
FIBA 3x3 AmeriCup
Silver medal – second place	2024 San Juan	Team
Women's basketball
Representing the United States
FIBA AmeriCup
Gold medal – first place	2019 Puerto Rico	Team

Brittney Sykes (born February 7, 1994) is an American professional basketball player with the Toronto Tempo of the Women's National Basketball Association (WNBA) and for the Laces of Unrivaled. She was drafted with the seventh overall pick in the 2017 WNBA draft. Her nickname is "Slim".

Sykes became the highest drafted Syracuse University women's basketball player in school history.

== Early life and education ==
Sykes is the daughter of Michael and Regina and has two older brothers. She graduated from Syracuse University with a bachelor's degree in Communications and Rhetorical Studies. She also achieved her Master's in instructional design, development, and evaluation in the School of Education.

== High school ==
In high school, Sykes was a 4-star recruit. She played guard at University High School in Newark, New Jersey. Along with her high school team, she played for a club team, the Philly Belles. Through her play on both teams, Sykes earned a 95 overall scouting grade for her playing, was ranked 31st out of all college recruits and was ranked 9th out of all of the recruits at her position (according to ESPN scouting reports). Her high school achievements include being a 2012 United States U18 national team member, a 2012 McDonald's All-American, Named 2012 USA Today All-USA Second Team, All-Tri-State Second Team, North-South Game MVP, All-State, All-Essex County First Team. In her high school career, she averaged 18.9 points, 12.9 rebounds, 3.6 assists as a senior. Her abilities led University High School to the Essex County Championship in 2011–12. In addition to her achievements on the court, Sykes was a member of the National Honor Society, student cabinet, and MSG Varsity Club. She graduated with the class of 2012 with the intent of playing for the Syracuse Orange in Syracuse, NY. Although she decided to accept the offer to play at Syracuse University, she also was sought after by Georgetown, Penn State, and Notre Dame.

== College career ==
Sykes attended Syracuse University. She was at the college for five years. She only played in four of those seasons due to a knee injury in her third season. She played both the shooting guard and small forward positions in her four seasons. She played a total of 138 games during her college career (started in 137 of those games), averaged 29.5 minutes per game, 1.9 assists per game, 5.9 rebounds, 13.4 points per game, and a total of 1846 career points, 85 blocks, and 266 steals. She ended her college career by becoming the number three ranked SU women's basketball for career points scored and earned All-American honors, and the title of the winningest Syracuse Orange women's basketball player with a total of 101 wins.

=== Injuries ===
In the span of her 2013-2014 and 2014–2015 seasons at Syracuse University, Sykes suffered two ACL tears. She tore her ACL the first time on March 22, 2014 in the NCAA Tournament in Lexington, KY. After 10 long months of rigorous therapy and recovery, Sykes was able to return to play in the 2014–2015 season.

On January 4, 2015 (approximately 43 minutes into her season), Sykes tore her ACL again in her third game back against Notre Dame. In interviews, Sykes has stated that she views her injuries as stepping stones to becoming both a stronger player and person.

== Professional career ==
=== WNBA ===
==== Atlanta Dream ====
After being drafted to the Atlanta Dream with the seventh pick of the 2017 WNBA draft, Sykes completed a very successful rookie year. She signed a three-year deal that started with a base salary of $47,738 in the first year, jumps to $48,693 in the second, $53,563 in the third and $60,867 in a fourth-year option (typical rookie contract). She was named the rookie of the month for both July and August and was the runner-up for rookie of the year earning 10 out of the 40 votes and ultimately losing to Allisha Gray. She was named to the 2017 WNBA all rookie team. She averaged 13.9 points per game (with a career high of 33 points against the Phoenix Mercury) and her 471 points was a new single-season rookie record for the Atlanta Dream franchise.

==== Los Angeles Sparks ====
In February 2020, Sykes was traded to the Los Angeles Sparks, along with center Marie Gülich in exchange for center Kalani Brown. In 2021 she earned WNBA All-Defensive First Team honors and was second in voting for Defensive Player of the Year. She played for the Sparks for three years.

==== Washington Mystics ====
In February 2023, Sykes was traded to the Washington Mystics. During her 2 1/2 seasons with Washington, she earned WNBA All-Defensive First Team honors, her first All-Star selection, and averaged 15.0 points, 4.3 rebounds, and 3.8 assists per game.

==== Seattle Storm ====
On August 5, 2025, Sykes was traded to the Seattle Storm in exchange for forward Alysha Clark, guard Zia Cooke, and Seattle's first-round pick in the 2026 WNBA Draft.

==== Toronto Tempo ====
On April 10, 2026, Sykes signed a two-year max contract with the Toronto Tempo for their inaugural season.

=== Overseas ===
Sykes played for Hapoel Petah Tikva in the Israeli Female Basketball Premier League in 2017. From that time on she regularly played in other overseas leagues during the WNBA offseason. These included in Turkey (OGM Ormanspor, 2018 and 2020–21; and Çukurova Basketbol, 2020), Spain (Uni Girona CB, 2019, 2022–23), Australia (University of Canberra Capitals, 2021–22), Hungary (Sopron Basket, 2022), and Poland (CCC Polkowice, 2023–24).

=== Unrivaled ===
On September 23, 2024, it was announced that Sykes would appear and play in the inaugural season of Unrivaled, the women's 3-on-3 basketball league founded by Napheesa Collier and Breanna Stewart. She was selected for Rose BC. Her team, Rose BC, won the first ever Unrivaled League Championship, in a game where she sank the winning shot and led the team in scoring.

On November 5, 2025, it was announced that Sykes had been drafted by Laces BC for the 2026 season.

== National team career ==
Sykes participated in 2012 USA U18 and 2013 USA U19 National Team trials before the start of her professional career. After her rookie WNBA season, Sykes was named to the 2018-20 national team pool on March 14, 2018.

== Personal life ==
Sykes got engaged to former basketball player Morghan Medlock on November 14, 2026.

== Career statistics ==
Legend
GP	Games played	GS	Games started	MPG	Minutes per game	RPG	Rebounds per game
APG	Assists per game	SPG	Steals per game	BPG	Blocks per game	PPG	Points per game
TO	Turnovers per game	FG%	Field-goal percentage	3P%	3-point field-goal percentage	FT%	Free-throw percentage
**Bold**	Career best	°	League leader

=== WNBA ===
==== Regular season ====
WNBA regular season statistics
Year	Team	GP	GS	MPG	FG%	3P%	FT%	RPG	APG	SPG	BPG	TO	PPG
2017	Atlanta	34	23	25.4	.408	.336	.729	4.1	1.9	.6	.5	1.7	13.9
2018	Atlanta	29	7	20.7	.411	.268	.663	3.5	2.3	.3	.6	**1.1**	9.7
2019	Atlanta	34	27	25.9	.365	.259	.703	4.4	2.5	.6	.5	2.0	10.2
2020	Los Angeles	21	14	24.6	**.487**	.327	.806	2.6	2.1	1.5	.3	1.7	10.1
2021	Los Angeles	32	20	29.3	.405	.262	.772	4.6	2.2	1.8	.5	1.4	9.4
2022	Los Angeles	32	24	28.8	.433	.269	.770	3.7	3.7	2.0	**.7**	2.6	12.7
2023	Washington	**40**	**40**	**31.3**	.439	**.350**	.797	**5.0**	3.8	**2.1**	.3	2.4	15.9
2024	Washington	18	18	23.3	.405	.271	.750	4.1	3.1	.9	.4	2.2	12.2
2025	Washington	25	25	31.0	.379	.318	.785	3.4	**4.4**	1.3	.3	2.7	15.4
2025	Seattle	14	13	30.0	.386	.278	.770	2.7	3.3	1.2	.4	2.1	11.8
2026	Toronto	17	17	29.4	.418	.258	**.897**	3.5	3.4	1.2	.5	2.1	**18.6**
**Career**	10 years, 5 teams	296	228	27.3	.411	.299	.770	3.9	2.9	1.3	.5	2.0	12.6
**Career**	All-Star	1	0	22.3	.444	.000	—	3.0	7.0	.0	.0	2.0	16.0

==== Playoffs ====
WNBA playoff statistics
Year	Team	GP	GS	MPG	FG%	3P%	FT%	RPG	APG	SPG	BPG	TO	PPG
2018	Atlanta	**5**	**5**	27.0	**.473**	**.412**	.500	3.6	1.6	.8	.2	**1.8**	12.6
2020	Los Angeles	1	1	22.0	.273	.000	**1.000**	5.0	2.0	.0	.0	3.0	8.0
2023	Washington	2	2	**39.0**	.414	.222	.500	**8.0**	**3.5**	**2.0**°	**.5**	3.0	**15.0**
2025	Seattle	3	3	22.0	.429	.000	.500	2.3	.7	.0	.3	3.7	4.3
**Career**	4 years, 4 teams	11	11	27.4	.431	.290	.550	4.2	1.7	.7	.3	2.6	10.4

=== College ===
NCAA statistics
Year	Team	GP	GS	MPG	FG%	3P%	FT%	RPG	APG	SPG	BPG	TO	PPG
2012–13	Syracuse	32	31	25.5	.430	.213	.609	5.7	1.3	2.0	.5	1.9	8.9
2013–14	Syracuse	32	32	31.2	**.505**	.333	.733	5.1	1.8	1.4	.6	2.4	16.6
2014–15	Syracuse	3	3	14.3	.231	.000	.250	4.3	1.3	1.7	.7	**1.3**	2.3
2015–16	Syracuse	**38**	**38**	29.3	.352	.231	.632	5.1	1.6	2.0	.6	2.0	10.3
2016–17	Syracuse	33	33	**33.3**	.452	**.393**	**.754**	**7.8**	**3.3**	**2.2**	**.8**	2.9	**19.2**
**Career**		138	137	29.5	.435	.305	.692	5.9	1.9	1.9	.6	2.3	13.4
