= 2020 New York Liberty season =

- Head coach: Walt Hopkins
- Arena: Originally: Barclays Center; Rescheduled to: IMG Academy gymnasiums, Bradenton, Florida

Results
- Record: 2–20 (.091)
- Place: 6th (Eastern)
- Playoff finish: Did not qualify

Media
- Television: YES

The 2020 WNBA season was the 24th season for the New York Liberty franchise of the WNBA. The Liberty opened the regular season on July 25, 2020, versus the Seattle Storm.

During the off-season the Liberty announced that they would return to the Barclays Center in Brooklyn as their permanent home. In the 2018 and 2019 seasons, the Liberty's primary home venue was the Westchester County Center in White Plains, New York. Additionally, the Liberty announced that Walt Hopkins would replace Katie Smith as head coach.

This WNBA season had planned to feature an all-time high 36 regular-season games. However, the plan for expanded games was put on hold on April 3, when the WNBA postponed its season due to the COVID-19 pandemic. Under a plan approved on June 15, the league is scheduled to hold a shortened 22-game regular season at IMG Academy, without fans present, starting on July 24.

The Liberty's shortened season started slowly, when they lost their first five games. Their first win came on August 7, but was followed by another seven straight losses. An eight-game losing streak saw the team finish 2–20 for the season. Number one overall draft pick Sabrina Ionescu only played in three games for the Liberty. Their .091 winning percentage was the worst in team history.

== Transactions ==
=== WNBA draft ===
Round	Pick	Player	Nationality	School/Team/Country
1	1	Sabrina Ionescu	United States	Oregon
1	9	Megan Walker	United States	UConn
1	12	Jazmine Jones	United States	Louisville
2	13	Kylee Shook	United States	Louisville
2	15	Leaonna Odom	United States	Duke
3	26	Erica Ogwumike	United States	Rice

=== Trades/Roster Changes ===
Date	Details
February 10, 2020	Signed G Layshia Clarendon
February 24, 2020	Re-signed G Marine Johannès
April 11, 2020	Engaged in a three team trade where the acquired the 13th pick in the 2020 draft and sent Sugar Rodgers to Las Vegas.
April 15, 2020	Engaged in 3 team trade where they acquired G Shatori Walker-Kimbrough, the twelfth pick in the 2020 WNBA draft and the first, second, and third round picks in the 2021 WNBA draft from the Washington Mystics in exchange for Tina Charles. They also acquired Tayler Hill and the ninth and fifteenth pick in the 2020 draft in exchange for the Mystics' 2021 first-round pick and New York's 2021 second round pick.
April 17, 2020	Traded the draft rights for G Erica Ogwumike to Minnesota in exchange for F Stephanie Talbot.
April 17, 2020	Acquired the draft rights to G/F Jocelyn Willoughby from Phoenix in exchange for G Shatori Walker-Kimbrough.
April 21, 2020	Waived G Brittany Boyd
April 29, 2020	Waived G Tayler Hill
April 29, 2020	Announced that F Stephanie Talbot would remain overseas for the 2020 season.
June 25, 2020	G Rebecca Allen opts out of the 2020 season.
June 26, 2020	Signed F Joyner Holmes.
July 7, 2020	G Asia Durr opts out of the 2020 season.

== Current roster ==
New York Liberty roster
Players
Coaches

Pos.	No.	Nat.	Name	Height	Weight	DOB	From	Yrs
G	7	(United States)	Clarendon, Layshia	5' 9" (1.75m)	158 lb (72kg)	1991-05-02	California	7
G	25	(United States)	Durr, Asia	5' 10" (1.78m)	151 lb (68kg)	1997-04-05	Louisville	1
F	10	(United States)	Holmes, Joyner	6' 3" (1.91m)	200 lb (91kg)	1998-02-22	Texas	R
G	20	(United States)	Ionescu, Sabrina (injured)	5' 11" (1.8m)	165 lb (75kg)	1997-12-06	Oregon	R
G	4	(United States)	Jones, Jazmine	6' 0" (1.83m)	160 lb (73kg)	1996-10-15	Louisville	R
G	22	(United States)	Kea, Paris	5' 9" (1.75m)	142 lb (64kg)	1996-04-07	North Carolina	1
G	5	(Canada)	Nurse, Kia	6' 0" (1.83m)	168 lb (76kg)	1996-02-22	Connecticut	2
F	0	(United States)	Odom, Leaonna	6' 2" (1.88m)	168 lb (76kg)	1998-03-26	Duke	R
F	24	(United States)	Shook, Kylee	6' 4" (1.93m)	200 lb (91kg)	1998-03-18	Louisville	R
C	41	(Turkey)	Stokes, Kiah	6' 3" (1.91m)	191 lb (87kg)	1993-03-30	Connecticut	4
F	3	(United States)	Walker, Megan	6' 1" (1.85m)	175 lb (79kg)	1998-11-23	Connecticut	R
G/F	13	(United States)	Willoughby, Jocelyn	6' 0" (1.83m)	180 lb (82kg)	1998-03-25	Virginia	R
C	17	(Sweden)	Zahui B., Amanda	6' 5" (1.96m)	250 lb (113kg)	1993-09-08	Minnesota	5

Head coach
(United States) Walt Hopkins
Assistant coaches
(United States) Shelley Patterson
(United States) Kelly Raimon
(United States) Dustin Gray

Legend

- (C) Team captain
- (DP) Unsigned draft pick
- (FA) Free agent
- (S) Suspended
- Injured

WNBA roster page

East
ATL
CHI
CON
IND
NY
TOR
WAS
West
DAL
GS
LV
LA
MIN
PHO
POR
SEA

== Game log ==
=== Regular season ===
2020 game log
Total: 2–20
July

Game	Date	Team	Score	High points	High rebounds	High assists	Location Attendance	Record
1	July 25	Seattle Storm	L 71–87	Clarendon (20)	Stokes (9)	Ionescu (4)	IMG Academy; 0	0–1
2	July 29	Dallas Wings	L 80–93	Ionescu (33)	Zahui B. (11)	Ionescu (7)	IMG Academy; 0	0–2
3	July 31	Atlanta Dream	L 78–84	Jones (20)	Stokes (7)	Clarendon (5)	IMG Academy; 0	0–3

August

Game	Date	Team	Score	High points	High rebounds	High assists	Location Attendance	Record
4	August 2	Phoenix Mercury	L 67–96	Nurse (17)	Zahui B. (9)	Tied (4)	IMG Academy; 0	0–4
5	August 5	Minnesota Lynx	L 66–92	Zahui B. (13)	Stokes (8)	Clarendon (6)	IMG Academy; 0	0–5
6	August 7	Washington Mystics	W 74–66	Nurse (17)	Zahui B. (14)	Clarendon (6)	IMG Academy; 0	1–5
7	August 9	Las Vegas Aces	L 76–78	Zahui B. (20)	Stokes (12)	Clarendon (8)	IMG Academy; 0	1–6
8	August 11	Los Angeles Sparks	L 78–93	Jones (24)	Zahui B. (10)	Clarendon (5)	IMG Academy; 0	1–7
9	August 13	Indiana Fever	L 79–86	Nurse (21)	Stokes (8)	Tied (3)	IMG Academy; 0	1–8
10	August 15	Minnesota Lynx	L 64–94	Jones (13)	Zahui B. (8)	Nurse (3)	IMG Academy; 0	1–9
11	August 18	Seattle Storm	L 64–105	Nurse (21)	Tied (6)	3 tied (2)	IMG Academy; 0	1–10
12	August 20	Chicago Sky	L 85–101	Jones (18)	Stokes (9)	Clarendon (5)	IMG Academy; 0	1–11
13	August 22	Connecticut Sun	L 65–82	Nurse (17)	Zahui B. (10)	Tied (5)	IMG Academy; 0	1–12
14	August 25	Chicago Sky	W 101–99	Zahui B. (22)	Zahui B. (12)	Clarendon (5)	IMG Academy; 0	2–12
15	August 29	Las Vegas Aces	L 63–80	Key (14)	Zahui B. (21)	Clarendon (4)	IMG Academy; 0	2–13

September

Game	Date	Team	Score	High points	High rebounds	High assists	Location Attendance	Record
16	September 1	Connecticut Sun	L 65–70	Nurse (18)	Zahui B. (10)	Tied (3)	IMG Academy; 0	2–14
17	September 3	Atlanta Dream	L 56–62	Tied (12)	Zahui B. (11)	Zahui B. (3)	IMG Academy; 0	2–15
18	September 5	Phoenix Mercury	L 67–83	Holmes (13)	Holmes (13)	Clarendon (3)	IMG Academy; 0	2–16
19	September 8	Los Angeles Sparks	L 70–96	Willoughby (21)	Stokes (8)	Clarendon (5)	IMG Academy; 0	2–17
20	September 10	Indiana Fever	L 75–85	Kea (21)	Jones (10)	Tied (4)	IMG Academy; 0	2–18
21	September 12	Washington Mystics	L 58–75	Tied (15)	Tied (7)	Jones (6)	IMG Academy; 0	2–19
22	September 13	Dallas Wings	L 79–82	Jones (21)	Zahui B. (10)	Nurse (7)	IMG Academy; 0	2–20

2020 season schedule

== Awards and honors ==
Recipient	Award	Date awarded	Ref.
Jazmine Jones	All-Rookie Team	September 27, 2020	

== Standings ==
#	Team	W	L	PCT	GB	Conf.
1	x – Las Vegas Aces	18	4	.818	–	8–2
2	x – Seattle Storm	18	4	.818	–	8–2
3	x – Los Angeles Sparks	15	7	.682	3	5–5
4	x – Minnesota Lynx	14	8	.636	4	4–6
5	x – Phoenix Mercury	13	9	.591	5	4–6
6	x – Chicago Sky	12	10	.545	6	6–4
7	x – Connecticut Sun	10	12	.455	8	7–3
8	x – Washington Mystics	9	13	.409	9	6–4
9	e – Dallas Wings	8	14	.364	10	1–9
10	e – Atlanta Dream	7	15	.318	11	5–5
11	e – Indiana Fever	6	16	.273	12	4–6
12	e – New York Liberty	2	20	.091	16	2–8

Notes

x – Clinched playoff berth
e – Eliminated from playoffs
Home and Away records not shown, as all games played at a neutral location.
Updated to include results from September 13, 2020

== Statistics ==
Legend
GP	Games played	GS	Games started	MPG	Minutes per game	RPG	Rebounds per game
APG	Assists per game	SPG	Steals per game	BPG	Blocks per game	PPG	Points per game
FG%	Field-goal percentage	3P%	3-point field-goal percentage	FT%	Free-throw percentage	TO	Turnovers per game
PF	Fouls per game		Team leader		League leader

=== Regular season ===
Player	GP	GS	MPG	FG%	3P%	FT%	RPG	APG	SPG	BPG	PPG
Sabrina Ionescu	3	3	26.7	45.2%	35.0%	100%	4.7	4.0	0.7	0.0	18.3
Kia Nurse	21	18	27.5	27.3%	23.8%	86.4%	2.9	2.3	0.5	0.2	12.2
Layshia Clarendon	19	19	26.1	46.5%	34.1%	87.3%	2.5	3.9	0.9	0	11.5
Jazmine Jones	20	2	21.4	40.4%	33.3%	78.8%	4.1	2.3	1.4	0.5	10.8
Amanda Zahui B.	21	20	25.3	35.3%	34.0%	69.4%	8.5	1.9	0.9	1.2	9.0
Paris Kea	11	5	15.0	38.4%	39.4%	87.5%	2.0	1.5	0.6	0.3	6.9
Jocelyn Willoughby	22	5	17.4	35.8%	40.5%	83.3%	2.4	0.9	0.7	0.3	5.8
Kiah Stokes	22	22	27.3	37.2%	23.5%	57.1%	6.7	1.2	0.5	1.2	5.7
Leaonna Odom	22	16	20.6	49.0%	25.0%	87.0%	2.3	0.7	0.7	0.4	5.5
Kylee Shook	20	0	14.5	40.5%	17.6%	82.4%	2.8	0.6	0.4	0.5	4.1
Megan Walker	18	0	11.4	32.1%	14.0%	60.0%	1.5	0.3	0.2	0.0	3.3
Joyner Holmes	19	0	10.0	30.6%	10.7%	75.0%	2.7	0.7	0.1	0.1	2.9
