= 2020 Las Vegas Aces season =

Women's National Basketball Association (WNBA) season franchising

- Head coach: Bill Laimbeer
- Arena: Originally: Mandalay Bay Events Center; Rescheduled to: IMG Academy gymnasiums, Bradenton, Florida

Results
- Record: 18–4 (.818)
- Place: 1st (Western)
- Playoff finish: 1st Seed, Lost 0–3 in Finals to Seattle Storm

The 2020 Las Vegas Aces season was the franchise's 24th season in the Women's National Basketball Association and the third year the franchise is based in Las Vegas - after relocating from San Antonio and Utah. This was the third season under head coach Bill Laimbeer. The regular season tipped off on July 26, 2020 versus the Chicago Sky.

This WNBA season would’ve had an all-time high 36 regular-season games. However, the plan for expanded games was put on hold on April 3, when the WNBA postponed its season due to the COVID-19 pandemic. Under a plan approved on June 15, the league began a shortened 22-game regular season at IMG Academy, without fans present, which started on July 24.

The Aces got off to a rough start to their season, losing two of their first three games. However, from there, the team would go on a seven-game winning streak and four game winning streak, only separated by a single loss. Their 12–3 record on August 29, would secure them a playoff berth. They lost on September 1, and that would be their last loss of the season. The Aces finished on a six-game winning streak, including a final day victory over the Seattle Storm to finish 18–4. The victory on the final day of the season secured them the first seed in the playoffs by virtue of a tie-breaker.

As the first seed, the Aces received a double-bye into the Semifinals of the playoffs. In the Semifinals, they played the seventh seeded Connecticut Sun. The Aces lost two of the first three games, but rebounded to win the final two games of the series to advance to the Finals. In the finals they faced the second seeded Storm. The Storm swept the best-of-five series three games to none, and the Aces finished runners up.

== Transactions ==
=== WNBA draft ===
The Aces will make the following selection in the 2020 WNBA draft.

Round	Pick	Player	Nationality	School/Team/Country
3	33	Lauren Manis	United States	Holy Cross

=== Trades and roster changes ===
Date	Details
February 10, 2020	Signed G Angel McCoughtry
February 16, 2020	Signed G Danielle Robinson
February 18, 2020	Re-signed G Sugar Rodgers
March 2, 2020	Re-signed G Lindsay Allen
April 22, 2020	Re-signed C Liz Cambage.
May 7, 2020	C Park Ji-su will sit out the season and stay in Korea.
May 15, 2020	Re-signed G Kelsey Plum.
May 19, 2020	Re-signed C Carolyn Swords
June 16, 2020	Signed G Alex Bentley
July 4, 2020	C Liz Cambage announced that she will be sitting out the 2020 season.
July 4, 2020	Signed C Avery Warley

== Roster ==
2020 Las Vegas Aces roster
Players
Coaches

Pos.	No.	Nat.	Name	Height	Weight	DOB	From	Yrs
G	15	(United States)	Allen, Lindsay	5' 8" (1.73m)	189 lb (86kg)	1995-03-20	Notre Dame	2
F	11	(United States)	Burdick, Cierra	6' 2" (1.88m)	172 lb (78kg)	1993-09-30	Tennessee	3
C	8	(Australia)	Cambage, Liz	6' 8" (2.03m)	216 lb (98kg)	1991-08-18	Australia	4
F	32	(United States)	Cannon, Emma	6' 2" (1.88m)	190 lb (86kg)	1989-06-01	Florida Southern	1
F	5	(United States)	Hamby, Dearica	6' 3" (1.91m)	189 lb (86kg)	1993-11-06	Wake Forest	5
G	21	(United States)	McBride, Kayla	5' 10" (1.78m)	174 lb (79kg)	1992-06-25	Notre Dame	6
G/F	35	(United States)	McCoughtry, Angel	6' 1" (1.85m)	173 lb (78kg)	1986-09-10	Louisville	10
G	10	(United States)	Plum, Kelsey	5' 8" (1.73m)	145 lb (66kg)	1994-08-24	Washington	3
G	3	(United States)	Robinson, Danielle	5' 9" (1.75m)	137 lb (62kg)	1989-05-10	Oklahoma	8
G	14	(United States)	Rodgers, Sugar	5' 9" (1.75m)	137 lb (62kg)	1989-12-08	Georgetown	7
C	4	(United States)	Swords, Carolyn	6' 6" (1.98m)	215 lb (98kg)	1989-07-19	Boston College	8
F	22	(United States)	Wilson, A'ja	6' 4" (1.93m)	195 lb (88kg)	1996-08-08	South Carolina	2
G	0	(United States)	Young, Jackie	6' 0" (1.83m)	165 lb (75kg)	1997-09-16	Notre Dame	1

Head coach
(United States) Bill Laimbeer (Notre Dame)
Assistant coaches
(United States) Vickie Johnson (Louisiana Tech)
(United States) Tanisha Wright (Penn State)

Legend

- (C) Team captain
- (DP) Unsigned draft pick
- (FA) Free agent
- (S) Suspended
- Injured

== Game log ==
=== Regular season ===
2020 game log
Total: 18–4
July

Game	Date	Team	Score	High points	High rebounds	High assists	Location Attendance	Record
1	July 26	Chicago Sky	L 86–88	McCoughtry (25)	Wilson (11)	Allen (7)	IMG Academy	0–1
2	July 29	Atlanta Dream	W 100-70	Wilson (21)	Wilson (11)	Tied (3)	IMG Academy	1–1
3	July 31	Phoenix Mercury	L 95–102	McCoughtry (18)	Wilson (8)	Tied (4)	IMG Academy	1–2

August

Game	Date	Team	Score	High points	High rebounds	High assists	Location Attendance	Record
4	August 2	Dallas Wings	W 79–70	Wilson (19)	Tied (8)	Hamby (4)	IMG Academy	2–2
5	August 5	Washington Mystics	W 83–77	Tied (20)	Hamby (13)	Robinson (3)	IMG Academy	3–2
6	August 7	Los Angeles Sparks	W 86–82	Wilson (26)	Wilson (11)	McCoughtry (5)	IMG Academy	4–2
7	August 9	New York Liberty	W 78–76	Wilson (31)	Young (7)	Tied (3)	IMG Academy	5–2
8	August 11	Indiana Fever	W 98–79	McCoughtry (20)	Wilson (11)	Tied (4)	IMG Academy	6–2
9	August 13	Minnesota Lynx	W 87–77	Wilson (23)	Wilson (8)	Allen (7)	IMG Academy	7–2
10	August 15	Washington Mystics	W 88–73	Young (16)	Swords (7)	Robinson (7)	IMG Academy	8–2
11	August 18	Chicago Sky	L 82–84	McCoughtry (17)	Wilson (8)	3 tied (4)	IMG Academy	8–3
12	August 20	Connecticut Sun	W 99–78	McBride (25)	McCoughtry (8)	Robinson (9)	IMG Academy	9–3
13	August 22	Seattle Storm	W 82–74	Wilson (23)	Tied (14)	Robinson (7)	IMG Academy	10–3
14	August 25	Dallas Wings	W 96–92	Wilson (26)	Hamby (14)	Young (4)	IMG Academy	11–3
15	August 29	New York Liberty	W 80–63	Wilson (20)	Hamby (10)	Robinson (6)	IMG Academy	12–3

September

Game	Date	Team	Score	High points	High rebounds	High assists	Location Attendance	Record
16	September 1	Phoenix Mercury	L 85–92	Young (20)	Hamby (13)	McBride (9)	IMG Academy	12–4
17	September 3	Connecticut Sun	W 93–78	Wilson (24)	3 tied (4)	Young (9)	IMG Academy	13–4
18	September 5	Atlanta Dream	W 89–79	Wilson (21)	Hamby (9)	Young (6)	IMG Academy	14–4
19	September 8	Indiana Fever	W 92–86	Wilson (22)	Wilson (16)	Young (7)	IMG Academy	15–4
20	September 10	Minnesota Lynx	W 104–89	McCoughtry (22)	Hamby (11)	3 tied (6)	IMG Academy	16–4
21	September 12	Los Angeles Sparks	W 84–70	Wilson (19)	Wilson (8)	McBride (6)	IMG Academy	17–4
22	September 13	Seattle Storm	W 86–84	Tied (23)	Swords (8)	Hamby (8)	IMG Academy	18–4

2020 season schedule

=== Playoffs ===
2020 playoff game log
Total: 3–5
Semifinals

Game	Date	Team	Score	High points	High rebounds	High assists	Location Attendance	Series
1	September 20	Connecticut Sun	L 62–87	Wilson (19)	Wilson (9)	Tied (3)	IMG Academy	0–1
2	September 22	Connecticut Sun	W 83–75	Wilson (29)	Wilson (7)	Young (5)	IMG Academy	1–1
3	September 24	Connecticut Sun	L 68–77	Wilson (20)	Wilson (12)	Young (7)	IMG Academy	1–2
4	September 27	Connecticut Sun	W 84–75	McCoughtry (29)	Wilson (13)	McCoughtry (6)	IMG Academy	2–2
5	September 29	Connecticut Sun	W 66–63	Wilson (23)	Wilson (11)	Tied (4)	IMG Academy	3–2

Finals

Game	Date	Team	Score	High points	High rebounds	High assists	Location Attendance	Series
1	October 2	Seattle Storm	L 80–93	McCoughtry (20)	Swords (12)	Tied (4)	IMG Academy	0–1
2	October 4	Seattle Storm	L 91–104	Wilson (20)	McCoughtry (8)	Robinson (10)	IMG Academy	0–2
3	October 6	Seattle Storm	L 59–92	Wilson (18)	Swords (10)	Wilson (4)	IMG Academy	0–3

2020 playoff schedule

== Standings ==
#	Team	W	L	PCT	GB	Conf.
1	x – Las Vegas Aces	18	4	.818	–	8–2
2	x – Seattle Storm	18	4	.818	–	8–2
3	x – Los Angeles Sparks	15	7	.682	3	5–5
4	x – Minnesota Lynx	14	8	.636	4	4–6
5	x – Phoenix Mercury	13	9	.591	5	4–6
6	x – Chicago Sky	12	10	.545	6	6–4
7	x – Connecticut Sun	10	12	.455	8	7–3
8	x – Washington Mystics	9	13	.409	9	6–4
9	e – Dallas Wings	8	14	.364	10	1–9
10	e – Atlanta Dream	7	15	.318	11	5–5
11	e – Indiana Fever	6	16	.273	12	4–6
12	e – New York Liberty	2	20	.091	16	2–8

Notes

x – Clinched playoff berth
e – Eliminated from playoffs
Home and Away records not shown, as all games played at a neutral location.
Updated to include results from September 13, 2020

== Playoffs ==
**First round** Single elimination (September 15)
5	**Phoenix Mercury**	**85**
8	Washington Mystics	84
6	Chicago Sky	81
7	**Connecticut Sun**	**94**

**Second round** Single elimination (September 17)
4	**Minnesota Lynx**	**80**
5	Phoenix Mercury	79
3	Los Angeles Sparks	59
7	**Connecticut Sun**	**73**

**Semifinals**; Best-of-5 (September 20–29)
1	**Las Vegas Aces**	**3**
7	Connecticut Sun	2
2	**Seattle Storm**	**3**
4	Minnesota Lynx	0

**WNBA Finals**; Best-of-5 (October 2–11)
1	Las Vegas Aces	0
2	**Seattle Storm**	**3**

Note: Teams re-seeded after each round.

- **Bold** – Game or series winner

== Statistics ==
Legend
GP	Games played	GS	Games started	MPG	Minutes per game	RPG	Rebounds per game
APG	Assists per game	SPG	Steals per game	BPG	Blocks per game	PPG	Points per game
FG%	Field-goal percentage	3P%	3-point field-goal percentage	FT%	Free-throw percentage	TO	Turnovers per game
PF	Fouls per game		Team leader		League leader

=== Regular season ===
Player	GP	GS	MPG	FG%	3P%	FT%	RPG	APG	SPG	BPG	PPG
A'ja Wilson	22	22	31.7	48.0	0	78.1	8.5	2.0	1.2	2.0	20.5
Angel McCoughtry	22	22	20.0	51.8	47.1	88.2	5.1	2.5	1.3	0.3	14.4
Dearica Hamby	22	0	28.3	53.9	47.4	71.6	7.1	2.7	1.7	0.2	13.0
Kayla McBride	22	22	26.6	42.5	34.2	89.7	2.3	2.4	1.2	0.1	12.5
Jackie Young	22	0	25.8	49.2	23.1	85.2	4.3	3.0	0.7	0.1	11.0
Danielle Robinson	22	1	7.4	32.1	31.3	75.0	2.4	3.3	0.9	0.1	7.4
Sugar Rodgers	22	0	12.0	32.1	31.3	75.0	1.3	1.4	0.3	0.1	3.4
Lindsay Allen	21	21	13.5	41.8	33.3	80.0	1.1	2.4	0.3	0	3.3
Carolyn Swords	22	22	17.5	46.0	0	77.3	4.6	0.9	0.2	0.1	2.9
Cierra Burdick	13	0	2.2	28.6	0	0	0.4	0.2	0	0	0.3
Emma Cannon	1	0	0	0	0	0	0	0	0	0	0

== Awards and honors ==
Recipient	Award	Date awarded	Ref.
A'ja Wilson	Western Conference Player of the Week	August 10, 2020	
A'ja Wilson	Western Conference Player of the Month – August	September 1, 2020	
Bill Laimbeer	WNBA Coach of the Month – August	September 1, 2020	
A'ja Wilson	Western Conference Player of the Week	September 14, 2020	
A'ja Wilson	Western Conference Player of the Month – September	September 15, 2020	
Bill Laimbeer	WNBA Coach of the Month – September	September 15, 2020	
A'ja Wilson	WNBA MVP	September 17, 2020	
Dearica Hamby	Sixth Woman of the Year	September 20, 2020	
Dan Padover	Basketball Executive of the Year	September 20, 2020	
A'ja Wilson	2nd Team All-Defense	September 29, 2020	
A'ja Wilson	All-WNBA First Team	October 4, 2020	
