= 2020 Indiana Fever season =

21st season in the WNBA

- Head coach: Marianne Stanley
- Arena: Originally: Hinkle Fieldhouse; Rescheduled to: IMG Academy gymnasiums, Bradenton, Florida

Results
- Record: 6–16 (.273)
- Place: 5th (Eastern)
- Playoff finish: Did not qualify

The 2020 Indiana Fever season was the franchise's 21st season in the Women's National Basketball Association (WNBA). The regular season tipped off on July 25, 2020, versus the Washington Mystics.

During the off-season the Fever announced that head coach Pokey Chatman would not return for the 2020 season. Chatman was replaced by Marianne Stanley. This will be Stanley's first head coaching job in the WNBA. She was previously an assistant with the Washington Mystics, Los Angeles Sparks, and New York Liberty.

Also, it was announced that the Bankers Life Fieldhouse would undergo renovations, which would force the Fever to host home games at the Hinkle Fieldhouse for the 2020 season.

This WNBA season will feature an all-time high 36 regular-season games. However, the plan for expanded games was put on hold on April 3, when the WNBA postponed its season due to the COVID-19 pandemic. Under a plan approved on June 15, the league is scheduled to hold a shortened 22-game regular season at IMG Academy, without fans present, starting on July 24.

The Fever started the season in a back-and-forth manner. The Fever went 2–2 in their first four games, alternating wins and losses. The season took a downward turn as the Fever lost five of their next seven games to be 4–7 at the halfway mark of the season. The second half started with a win but was marred by an eight-game losing streak. The Fever won the next to last game and lost on the final day of the season to finish 6–16. Their .273 winning percentages was the third worst in franchise history.

== Transactions ==
=== WNBA draft ===
The Fever will make the following selections in the 2020 WNBA draft.

Round	Pick	Player	Nationality	School/Team/Country
1	3	Lauren Cox	United States	Baylor
2	14	Kathleen Doyle	United States	Iowa
3	28	Kamiah Smalls	United States	James Madison

=== Trades and roster changes ===
Date	Details
February 13, 2020	Re-signed G Tiffany Mitchell
February 13, 2020	Re-signed F Betnijah Laney
February 19, 2020	Signed C Bernadett Határ
March 2, 2020	Signed G Julie Allemand
March 6, 2020	Traded G Shenise Johnson and the 16th pick in the 2020 WNBA draft to the Minnesota Lynx in exchange for the 14th pick in the 2020 WNBA draft and Minnesota's second-round pick in the 2021 WNBA draft.
April 22, 2020	Released G Paris Key
April 22, 2020	Released F Erica McCall
August 28, 2020	Acquired C Jantel Lavender and the Chicago Sky's second and third-round picks in the 2021 Draft in exchange for F Stephanie Mavunga.

== Roster ==
2020 Indiana Fever roster
Players
Coaches

Pos.	No.	Nat.	Name	Height	Weight	DOB	From	Yrs
F	11	(Canada)	Achonwa, Natalie	6' 3" (1.91m)	190 lb (86kg)	1992-11-22	Notre Dame	5
G	20	(Belgium)	Allemand, Julie	5' 8" (1.73m)	147 lb (67kg)	1996-07-07	Belgium	R
G	8	(United States)	Burke, Kennedy	6' 1" (1.85m)	182 lb (83kg)	1997-02-14	UCLA	1
F	13	(United States)	Cox, Lauren	6' 4" (1.93m)		1998-04-20	Baylor	R
G	2	(United States)	Doyle, Kathleen	5' 9" (1.75m)		1998-06-11	Iowa	R
F	4	(United States)	Dupree, Candice	6' 2" (1.88m)	178 lb (81kg)	1984-09-16	Temple	14
F	7	(United States)	Lavender, Jantel	6' 4" (1.93m)	185 lb (84kg)	1988-11-12	Ohio State	9
C	15	(United States)	McCowan, Teaira	6' 7" (2.01m)	239 lb (108kg)	1996-09-28	Mississippi State	1
G	25	(United States)	Mitchell, Tiffany	5' 9" (1.75m)	152 lb (69kg)	1994-09-23	South Carolina	4
G	0	(United States)	Mitchell, Kelsey	5' 8" (1.73m)	160 lb (73kg)	1995-11-12	Ohio State	2
G	3	(United States)	Smalls, Kamiah	5' 10" (1.78m)		1998-04-17	James Madison	R
G	35	(United States)	Vivians, Victoria	6' 1" (1.85m)	183 lb (83kg)	1994-11-17	Mississippi State	1
G	17	(United States)	Wheeler, Erica	5' 7" (1.7m)	143 lb (65kg)	1991-05-02	Rutgers	5

Head coach
(United States) Marianne Stanley (Immaculata)
Assistant coaches
(United States) Steve Smith
(United States) April (McDivitt) Schilling
Athletic trainer
(United States) Garrett Hueber
Strength and conditioning coach
(United States) Shannon Patterson

Legend

- (C) Team captain
- (DP) Unsigned draft pick
- (FA) Free agent
- (S) Suspended
- Injured

== Game log ==
=== Regular season ===
2020 game log
Total: 6–16
July

Game	Date	Team	Score	High points	High rebounds	High assists	Location Attendance	Record
1	July 25	Washington Mystics	L 76–101	K. Mitchell (25)	Achonwa (7)	Tied (3)	IMG Academy; 0	0–1
2	July 29	Phoenix Mercury	W 106–100	T. Mitchell (24)	McCowan (13)	K. Mitchell (5)	IMG Academy; 0	1–1
3	July 31	Dallas Wings	L 73–76	Tied (11)	Tied (8)	Allemand (11)	IMG Academy; 0	1–2

August

Game	Date	Team	Score	High points	High rebounds	High assists	Location Attendance	Record
4	August 2	Atlanta Dream	W 93–77	K. Mitchell (23)	Allemand (7)	Allemand (9)	IMG Academy; 0	2–2
5	August 5	Los Angeles Sparks	L 75–86	K. Mitchell (24)	Dupree (7)	T. Mitchell (5)	IMG Academy; 0	2–3
6	August 7	Minnesota Lynx	L 80–87	Tied (15)	McCowan (12)	Allemand (6)	IMG Academy; 0	2–4
7	August 9	Washington Mystics	W 91–84	K. Mitchell (29)	McCowan (11)	Allemand (5)	IMG Academy; 0	3–4
8	August 11	Las Vegas Aces	L 79–98	Dupree (20)	McCowan (8)	Allemand (6)	IMG Academy; 0	3–5
9	August 13	New York Liberty	W 86–79	T. Mitchell (19)	McCowan (13)	Allemand (5)	IMG Academy; 0	4–5
10	August 15	Los Angeles Sparks	L 76–90	K. Mitchell (25)	T. Mitchell (8)	Tied (4)	IMG Academy; 0	4–6
11	August 18	Connecticut Sun	L 62–84	K. Mitchell (15)	Allemand (8)	Tied (5)	IMG Academy; 0	4–7
12	August 20	Seattle Storm	W 90–84	Burke (23)	McCowan (10)	Allemand (6)	IMG Academy; 0	5–7
13	August 22	Chicago Sky	L 76–87	Dupree (18)	Cox (6)	Allemand (7)	IMG Academy; 0	5–8
14	August 25	Seattle Storm	L 74–87	Burke (17)	McCowan (11)	Tied (5)	IMG Academy; 0	5–9
15	August 29	Dallas Wings	L 78–82	K. Mitchell (19)	Dupree (9)	K. Mitchell (4)	IMG Academy; 0	5–10
16	August 31	Chicago Sky	L 77–100	McCowan (15)	McCowan (11)	Allemand (10)	IMG Academy; 0	5–11

September

Game	Date	Team	Score	High points	High rebounds	High assists	Location Attendance	Record
17	September 1	Atlanta Dream	L 90–102	Tied (20)	Tied (7)	Tied (5)	IMG Academy; 0	5–12
18	September 3	Phoenix Mercury	L 81–105	K. Mitchell (16)	Achonwa (10)	Dupree (5)	IMG Academy; 0	5–13
19	September 5	Connecticut Sun	L 77–96	K. Mitchell (16)	McCowan (7)	Allemand (8)	IMG Academy; 0	5–14
20	September 8	Las Vegas Aces	L 86–92	K. Mitchell (24)	McCowan (9)	Allemand (8)	IMG Academy; 0	5–15
21	September 10	New York Liberty	W 85–75	Dupree (22)	Dupree (6)	Dupree (7)	IMG Academy; 0	6–15
22	September 12	Minnesota Lynx	L 86–98	K. Mitchell (20)	McCowan (9)	Allemand (9)	IMG Academy; 0	6–16

2020 season schedule

== Awards and honors ==
Recipient	Award	Date awarded	Ref.
Julie Allemand	All-Rookie Team	September 27, 2030	

== Standings ==
#	Team	W	L	PCT	GB	Conf.
1	x – Las Vegas Aces	18	4	.818	–	8–2
2	x – Seattle Storm	18	4	.818	–	8–2
3	x – Los Angeles Sparks	15	7	.682	3	5–5
4	x – Minnesota Lynx	14	8	.636	4	4–6
5	x – Phoenix Mercury	13	9	.591	5	4–6
6	x – Chicago Sky	12	10	.545	6	6–4
7	x – Connecticut Sun	10	12	.455	8	7–3
8	x – Washington Mystics	9	13	.409	9	6–4
9	e – Dallas Wings	8	14	.364	10	1–9
10	e – Atlanta Dream	7	15	.318	11	5–5
11	e – Indiana Fever	6	16	.273	12	4–6
12	e – New York Liberty	2	20	.091	16	2–8

Notes

x – Clinched playoff berth
e – Eliminated from playoffs
Home and Away records not shown, as all games played at a neutral location.
Updated to include results from September 13, 2020

== Statistics ==
Legend
GP	Games played	GS	Games started	MPG	Minutes per game	RPG	Rebounds per game
APG	Assists per game	SPG	Steals per game	BPG	Blocks per game	PPG	Points per game
FG%	Field-goal percentage	3P%	3-point field-goal percentage	FT%	Free-throw percentage	TO	Turnovers per game
PF	Fouls per game		Team leader		League leader

=== Regular season ===
Player	GP	GS	MPG	FG%	3P%	FT%	RPG	APG	SPG	BPG	PPG
Kelsey Mitchell	22	22	32.1	44.8	38.9	84.9	2.2	2.8	0.6	0.1	17.9
Tiffany Mitchell	19	11	26.4	34.6	23.3	95.1	3.4	2.6	0.6	0.1	12.7
Candice Dupree	22	22	30.2	46.2	16.7	85.4	5.7	2.5	0.7	0.4	12.5
Teaira McCowan	22	10	21.0	53.6	0	75.0	7.3	0.6	0.3	1.0	10.9
Julie Allemand	22	22	32.5	45.9	47.8	73.3	4.5	5.8	1.1	0.4	8.5
Natalie Achonwa	18	11	20.2	49.6	0	81.3	5.5	1.7	0.5	0.6	7.8
Kennedy Burke	22	11	18.3	44.9	31.3	71.4	1.8	1.1	0.6	0.4	7.2
Victoria Vivians	6	0	14.2	34.5	18.2	87.5	2.3	0.5	0.2	0	4.8
Kamiah Smalls	7	0	14.3	45.0	58.3	100	1.1	2.0	0.1	0.1	3.9
Lauren Cox	14	1	13.1	41.9	50.0	73.3	0.8	1.1	0.4	0	3.6
Kathleen Doyle	18	0	8.6	24.4	23.8	50.0	0.8	1.1	0.4	0	1.5
