= 2020 Washington Mystics season =

- Head coach: Mike Thibault
- Arena: Originally: St. Elizabeths East Arena; Rescheduled to: IMG Academy gymnasiums, Bradenton, Florida

Results
- Record: 9–13 (.409)
- Place: 3rd (Eastern)
- Playoff finish: 8th Seed, Lost in First Round to Phoenix Mercury

The 2020 Washington Mystics season was the franchise's 23rd season in the Women's National Basketball Association (WNBA). The regular season tipped off versus the Indiana Fever on July 25, 2020.

This WNBA season will feature an all-time high 36 regular-season games. However, the plan for expanded games was put on hold on April 3, when the WNBA postponed its season due to the COVID-19 pandemic. Under a plan approved on June 15, the league is scheduled to hold a shortened 22-game regular season at IMG Academy, without fans present, starting on July 24.

The Mystics were without star Elena Delle Donne for the season, as she sat out due to COVID-19 concerns. Expectations were lowered when it was announced that the 2019 MVP would be out for the season. However, the Mystics defied those expectations in their first three games, winning all three. However, the season took a drastic turn for the worse after that, with the team going 1–11 in their August games. At 4–11 overall, the Mystics were on the outside looking in for the playoffs. The Mystics went 5–2 in September, including a four game win-streak to finish the season and secure the eight seed in the playoffs. As the eight seed, they lost in the first round to the Phoenix Mercury.

== Transactions ==
=== WNBA draft ===
Round	Pick	Player	Nationality	School/Team/Country
2	24	Jaylyn Agnew	United States	Creighton
3	36	Sug Sutton	United States	Texas

=== Trades and roster changes ===
Date	Details
February 11, 2020	Re-Signed F Elena Delle Donne
February 13, 2020	Signed G Leilani Mitchell
February 17, 2020	Re-signed G Emma Meesseman
April 15, 2020	Engaged in a three team trade where they acquired Tina Charles in exchange for their first-round pick in the 2020 WNBA draft and their first, second, and third round pick in the 2021 WNBA draft and G Shatori Walker-Kimbrough.
June 22, 2020	G Natasha Cloud and F/C LaToya Sanders announce they will opt out of the 2020 season.
June 26, 2020	Signed G/F Essence Carson.
June 29, 2020	Signed C Alaina Coates and G Shey Peddy.

== Roster ==
2020 Washington Mystics roster
Players
Coaches

Pos.	No.	Nat.	Name	Height	Weight	DOB	From	Yrs
G	7	(United States)	Atkins, Ariel	5' 8" (1.73m)	167 lb (76kg)	1996-07-30	Texas	2
C	31	(United States)	Charles, Tina	6' 4" (1.93m)	192 lb (87kg)	1988-12-05	Connecticut	10
C	81	(United States)	Coates, Alaina	6' 4" (1.93m)	225 lb (102kg)	1995-04-07	South Carolina	2
G/F	11	(United States)	Delle Donne, Elena	6' 5" (1.96m)	187 lb (85kg)	1989-09-05	Delaware	7
F	88	(Greece)	Gemelos, Jacki	6' 0" (1.83m)	165 lb (75kg)	1988-11-22	USC	1
F	21	(United States)	Hawkins, Tianna	6' 3" (1.91m)	186 lb (84kg)	1991-03-02	Maryland	6
F	2	(United States)	Hines-Allen, Myisha	6' 2" (1.88m)	200 lb (91kg)	1996-05-30	Louisville	2
G	4	(United States)	Johnson, Stella	5' 10" (1.78m)	158 lb (72kg)	1998-07-11	Rider	R
G	1	(United States)	Leslie, Kiara	6' 0" (1.83m)	175 lb (79kg)	1995-12-06	NC State	R
F	33	(Belgium)	Meesseman, Emma	6' 4" (1.93m)	191 lb (87kg)	1993-05-13	Belgium	6
G	5	(United States)	Mitchell, Leilani	5' 5" (1.65m)	138 lb (63kg)	1985-06-15	Utah	11
G/F	23	(United States)	Powers, Aerial	5' 9" (1.75m)	159 lb (72kg)	1994-07-17	Michigan State	4
G	0	(United States)	Sutton, Sug	5' 8" (1.73m)	140 lb (64kg)	1998-12-17	Texas	R

Head coach
(United States) Mike Thibault (Saint Martin's)
Assistant coaches
(United States) Eric Thibault (Missouri)
(United States) Asjha Jones (Connecticut)
Athletic trainer
(United States) Chalisa Fonza (Western Illinois)

Legend

- (C) Team captain
- (DP) Unsigned draft pick
- (FA) Free agent
- (S) Suspended
- Injured

== Game log ==
=== Regular season ===
2020 game log
Total: 9–13
July

Game	Date	Team	Score	High points	High rebounds	High assists	Location Attendance	Record
1	July 25	Indiana Fever	W 101–76	Hines-Allen (27)	Hines-Allen (10)	Mitchell (4)	IMG Academy; No In-Person Attendance	1–0
2	July 28	Connecticut Sun	W 94–89	Powers (27)	Hines-Allen (8)	Meesseman (8)	IMG Academy; No In-Person Attendance	2–0
3	July 30	Seattle Storm	W 89–71	Atkins (22)	Powers (8)	Mitchell (6)	IMG Academy; No In-Person Attendance	3–0

August

Game	Date	Team	Score	High points	High rebounds	High assists	Location Attendance	Record
4	August 1	Chicago Sky	L 86–88	Atkins (24)	Hines-Allen (10)	Meesseman (6)	IMG Academy; No In-Person Attendance	3–1
5	August 5	Las Vegas Aces	L 77–83	Meesseman (24)	Meesseman (13)	Mitchell (4)	IMG Academy; No In-Person Attendance	3–2
6	August 7	New York Liberty	L 66–74	Powers (20)	Hines-Allen (8)	Mitchell (5)	IMG Academy; No In-Person Attendance	3–3
7	August 9	Indiana Fever	L 84–91	Meesseman (19)	Hawkins (10)	Mitchell (5)	IMG Academy; No In-Person Attendance	3–4
8	August 11	Minnesota Lynx	L 48–68	Hines-Allen (12)	3 tied (6)	3 tied (3)	IMG Academy; No In-Person Attendance	3–5
9	August 13	Los Angeles Sparks	L 64–81	Atkins (20)	Meesseman (11)	Tied (5)	IMG Academy; No In-Person Attendance	3–6
10	August 15	Las Vegas Aces	L 73–88	Atkins (17)	Meesseman (9)	Tied (5)	IMG Academy; No In-Person Attendance	3–7
11	August 19	Atlanta Dream	W 98–91	Johnson (25)	Meesseman (6)	Meesseman (10)	IMG Academy; No In-Person Attendance	4–7
12	August 21	Dallas Wings	L 92–101 (OT)	Hines-Allen (35)	Hines-Allen (12)	Mitchell (4)	IMG Academy; No In-Person Attendance	4–8
13	August 23	Phoenix Mercury	L 87–88	Hawkins (19)	Hines-Allen (13)	Hines-Allen (8)	IMG Academy; No In-Person Attendance	4–9
14	August 28	Phoenix Mercury	L 72–94	Mitchell (17)	Tied (6)	Mitchell (5)	IMG Academy; No In-Person Attendance	4–10
15	August 30	Connecticut Sun	L 63–76	Tied (14)	Hines-Allen (13)	Hines-Allen (6)	IMG Academy; No In-Person Attendance	4–11

September

Game	Date	Team	Score	High points	High rebounds	High assists	Location Attendance	Record
16	September 2	Seattle Storm	L 64–71	Meesseman (17)	Hines-Allen (6)	Mitchell (5)	IMG Academy; No In-Person Attendance	4–12
17	September 4	Chicago Sky	W 79–69	Mitchell (20)	Hines-Allen (10)	Mitchell (12)	IMG Academy; No In-Person Attendance	5–12
18	September 6	Dallas Wings	L 94–101 (OT)	Atkins (22)	Hines-Allen (13)	Mitchell (9)	IMG Academy; No In-Person Attendance	5–13
19	September 8	Minnesota Lynx	W 89–86	Hines-Allen (26)	Hines-Allen (9)	Mitchell (10)	IMG Academy; No In-Person Attendance	6–13
20	September 10	Los Angeles Sparks	W 80–72	Hines-Allen (30)	Hines-Allen (8)	Mitchell (9)	IMG Academy; No In-Person Attendance	7–13
21	September 12	New York Liberty	W 75–58	Hines-Allen (25)	Hines-Allen (11)	Meesseman (7)	IMG Academy; No In-Person Attendance	8–13
22	September 13	Atlanta Dream	W 85–78	Atkins (26)	Hines-Allen (10)	Tied (7)	IMG Academy; No In-Person Attendance	9–13

2020 season schedule

=== Playoffs ===
2020 playoff game log
Total: 0–1
First Round

Game	Date	Team	Score	High points	High rebounds	High assists	Location Attendance	Series
1	September 15	Phoenix Mercury	L 84–85	Mitchell (25)	Hines-Allen (9)	4 tied (4)	IMG Academy	0–1

2020 playoff schedule

== Standings ==
#	Team	W	L	PCT	GB	Conf.
1	x – Las Vegas Aces	18	4	.818	–	8–2
2	x – Seattle Storm	18	4	.818	–	8–2
3	x – Los Angeles Sparks	15	7	.682	3	5–5
4	x – Minnesota Lynx	14	8	.636	4	4–6
5	x – Phoenix Mercury	13	9	.591	5	4–6
6	x – Chicago Sky	12	10	.545	6	6–4
7	x – Connecticut Sun	10	12	.455	8	7–3
8	x – Washington Mystics	9	13	.409	9	6–4
9	e – Dallas Wings	8	14	.364	10	1–9
10	e – Atlanta Dream	7	15	.318	11	5–5
11	e – Indiana Fever	6	16	.273	12	4–6
12	e – New York Liberty	2	20	.091	16	2–8

Notes

x – Clinched playoff berth
e – Eliminated from playoffs
Home and Away records not shown, as all games played at a neutral location.
Updated to include results from September 13, 2020

== Playoffs ==
**First round** Single elimination (September 15)
5	**Phoenix Mercury**	**85**
8	Washington Mystics	84
6	Chicago Sky	81
7	**Connecticut Sun**	**94**

**Second round** Single elimination (September 17)
4	**Minnesota Lynx**	**80**
5	Phoenix Mercury	79
3	Los Angeles Sparks	59
7	**Connecticut Sun**	**73**

**Semifinals**; Best-of-5 (September 20–29)
1	**Las Vegas Aces**	**3**
7	Connecticut Sun	2
2	**Seattle Storm**	**3**
4	Minnesota Lynx	0

**WNBA Finals**; Best-of-5 (October 2–11)
1	Las Vegas Aces	0
2	**Seattle Storm**	**3**

Note: Teams re-seeded after each round.

- **Bold** – Game or series winner

== Statistics ==
Legend
GP	Games played	GS	Games started	MPG	Minutes per game	RPG	Rebounds per game
APG	Assists per game	SPG	Steals per game	BPG	Blocks per game	PPG	Points per game
FG%	Field-goal percentage	3P%	3-point field-goal percentage	FT%	Free-throw percentage	TO	Turnovers per game
PF	Fouls per game		Team leader		League leader

=== Regular season ===
Player	GP	GS	MPG	FG%	3P%	FT%	RPG	APG	SPG	BPG	PPG
Myisha Hines-Allen	22	22	30.0	51.0	42.6	82.8	8.9	2.6	1.5	0.2	17.0
Aerial Powers	6	6	29.8	46.4	34.6	83.3	4.8	2.5	1.5	0	16.3
Ariel Atkins	22	22	31.0	43.8	41.1	88.6	2.9	2.4	1.8	0.3	14.8
Emma Meesseman	20	20	31.0	45.4	28.9	82.9	5.3	4.5	1.2	0.8	13.0
Leilani Mitchell	22	22	30.6	40.8	30.5	87.2	2.8	5.4	0.8	0	9.5
Stella Johnson	5	2	18.8	48.5	64.3	100	2.0	2.4	1.0	0.4	9.2
Tianna Hawkins	17	5	19.4	40.8	29.8	84.6	3.5	1.0	0.8	0.4	8.5
Kiara Leslie	19	10	21.8	35.2	36.2	92.3	3.0	1.1	0.5	0.4	5.5
Jacki Gemelos	12	1	16.1	31.3	20.7	50.0	1.4	1.2	0.3	0.1	3.2
Sug Sutton	12	0	9.4	36.4	29.4	71.4	0.8	1.0	0.1	0	2.8
Alaina Coates	20	0	9.9	52.9	0	53.8	2.8	0.5	0.4	0.2	2.5

== Awards and honors ==
Recipient	Award	Date awarded	Ref.
Myisha Hines-Allen	Eastern Conference Player of the Week	August 3, 2020	
Myisha Hines-Allen	Eastern Conference Player of the Week	September 14, 2020	
Myisha Hines-Allen	Eastern Conference Player of the Month – September	September 15, 2020	
Ariel Atkins	2nd Team All-Defense	September 29, 2020	
Myisha Hines-Allen	All-WNBA Second Team	October 4, 2020	
