= 2020 Dallas Wings season =

- Head coach: Brian Agler
- Arena: Originally: College Park Center; Rescheduled to: IMG Academy gymnasiums, Bradenton, Florida

Results
- Record: 8–14 (.364)
- Place: 6th (Western)
- Playoff finish: Did not Qualify

The 2020 Dallas Wings season was the franchise's 23rd season in the Women's National Basketball Association (WNBA) and the 5th season for the franchise in Dallas. The regular season started on July 26, 2020, versus the Atlanta Dream. This will be the second season under head coach Brian Agler.

This WNBA season will have an all-time high 36 regular-season games. However, the plan for expanded games was put on hold on April 3, when the WNBA postponed its season due to the COVID-19 pandemic. Under a plan approved on June 15, the league is scheduled to hold a shortened 22-game regular season at IMG Academy, without fans present, starting on July 24.

The Wings started the season strongly, winning two of their first three games. The season then took a downward turn when the team had two separate three game losing streaks, separated by only one win. Dallas finished August 3–3 to arrive at a 6–10 overall record. The team went 2–4 in September, but ended the season with a win. A bright spot for the team was Arike Ogunbowale, who lead the WNBA in scoring and was named to the All-WNBA First Team.

== Transactions ==
=== WNBA draft ===
The Wings will make the following selections in the 2020 WNBA draft.

Round	Pick	Player	Nationality	School/Team/Country
1	2	Satou Sabally	Germany	Oregon
1	5	Bella Alarie	United States	Princeton
1	7	Tyasha Harris	United States	South Carolina
2	21	Luisa Geiselsöder	Germany	Donau-Ries (Germany)

=== Trades and roster changes ===
Date	Details
February 10, 2020	Signed G Moriah Jefferson
February 10, 2020	Signed F/C Megan Gustafson
February 10, 2020	Signed C Imani McGee-Stafford
February 10, 2020	Signed G Karlie Samuelson
February 10, 2020	Signed F Morgan Bertsch
February 11, 2020	Signed F Isabelle Harrison
February 12, 2020	Traded G Skylar Diggins-Smith to the Phoenix Mercury in exchange for the 5th and 7th picks in the 2020 WNBA draft and a first round selection in the 2021 WNBA draft.
February 12, 2020	Traded the first round selection in the 2021 WNBA draft acquired from Phoenix to the Chicago Sky in exchange for C Astou Ndour
February 14, 2020	Traded F Azurá Stevens to the Chicago Sky in exchange for Chicago's First Round pick in the 2021 WNBA draft and F Katie Lou Samuelson
February 21, 2020	Acquired G Marina Mabrey from the Los Angeles Sparks in exchange for their Second round pick in the 2021 WNBA draft
April 15, 2020	Engaged in 3 team trade in which they acquired a 2021 first round draft pick from the Washington Mystics and a second round draft pick New York Liberty for G Tayler Hill and the ninth and fifteenth pick in the 2020 draft to the New York Liberty.
April 23, 2020	Waived G Kaela Davis
May 26, 2020	Traded C Kristine Anigwe and a third round pick in the 2021 draft to Los Angeles in exchange for a second round pick in the 2021 draft.

== Roster ==
2020 Dallas Wings roster
Players
Coaches

Pos.	No.	Nat.	Name	Height	Weight	DOB	From	Yrs
F/C	32	(United States)	Alarie, Bella	6' 4" (1.93m)		1998-04-23	Princeton	R
G	15	(United States)	Gray, Allisha	6' 0" (1.83m)	167 lb (76kg)	1995-01-12	South Carolina	3
F	10	(United States)	Gustafson, Megan	6' 3" (1.91m)	195 lb (88kg)	1996-12-13	Iowa	1
G	52	(United States)	Harris, Tyasha	5' 10" (1.78m)		1998-05-01	South Carolina	R
F	20	(United States)	Harrison, Isabelle	6' 3" (1.91m)	183 lb (83kg)	1993-09-27	Tennessee	3
G	4	(United States)	Jefferson, Moriah	5' 6" (1.68m)	123 lb (56kg)	1994-03-08	Connecticut	3
G	5	(United States)	Mabrey, Marina	5' 11" (1.8m)	170 lb (77kg)	1996-09-14	Notre Dame	1
F/C	45	(Spain)	Ndour, Astou	6' 5" (1.96m)	150 lb (68kg)	1994-08-22	Spain	4
G	24	(United States)	Ogunbowale, Arike	5' 8" (1.73m)	165 lb (75kg)	1997-03-02	Notre Dame	1
F	0	(Germany)	Sabally, Satou	6' 4" (1.93m)		1998-04-25	Oregon	R
F	33	(United States)	Samuelson, Katie Lou	6' 3" (1.91m)	163 lb (74kg)	1997-06-13	Connecticut	1
F	6	(United States)	Thornton, Kayla	6' 1" (1.85m)	190 lb (86kg)	1992-10-20	UTEP	4

Head coach
(United States) Brian Agler (Wittenberg)
Assistant coaches
(United States) Crystal Robinson (SE Oklahoma State)
(United States) Bryce Agler (Wittenberg)
Athletic trainer
(United States) Branay Hicks (UT Tyler)

Legend

- (C) Team captain
- (DP) Unsigned draft pick
- (FA) Free agent
- (S) Suspended
- Injured

== Game log ==
=== Regular season ===
2020 game log
Total: 8–14
July

Game	Date	Team	Score	High points	High rebounds	High assists	Location Attendance	Record
1	July 26	Atlanta Dream	95–105	Ogunbowale (19)	Harrison (10)	Sabally (5)	IMG Academy	0–1
2	July 29	New York Liberty	W 93–80	Ogunbowale (20)	Tied (6)	3 tied (4)	IMG Academy	1–1
3	July 31	Indiana Fever	W 76–73	Sabally (23)	Sabally (17)	Harris (5)	IMG Academy	2–1

August

Game	Date	Team	Score	High points	High rebounds	High assists	Location Attendance	Record
4	August 2	Las Vegas Aces	L 70–79	Ogunbowale (20)	Tied (6)	Jefferson (3)	IMG Academy	2–2
5	August 4	Chicago Sky	L 79–82	Ogunbowale (26)	Alarie (9)	Ogunbowale (5)	IMG Academy	2–3
6	August 6	Connecticut Sun	L 68–91	Ogunbowale (17)	Harrison (9)	Harris (7)	IMG Academy	2–4
7	August 8	Atlanta Dream	W 85–75	Ogunbowale (24)	Jefferson (10)	Ogunbowale (6)	IMG Academy	3–4
8	August 10	Phoenix Mercury	L 79–91	Ogunbowale (22)	Sabally (10)	Harrison (4)	IMG Academy	3–5
9	August 12	Connecticut Sun	L 66–70	Ogunbowale (19)	Sabally (9)	Sabally (3)	IMG Academy	3–6
10	August 14	Seattle Storm	L 65–83	Ogunbowale (22)	Ndour (8)	Mabrey (4)	IMG Academy	3–7
11	August 16	Phoenix Mercury	W 95–89	Ogunbowale (33)	Gray (7)	Samuelson (4)	IMG Academy	4–7
12	August 19	Minnesota Lynx	L 84–91	Gray (22)	Thornton (11)	Mabrey (5)	IMG Academy	4–8
13	August 21	Washington Mystics	W 101–92	Ogunbowale (24)	Thornton (10)	Ogunbowale (9)	IMG Academy	5–8
14	August 23	Los Angeles Sparks	L 81–84	Ogunbowale (20)	Sabally (9)	Ogunbowale (5)	IMG Academy	5–9
15	August 25	Las Vegas Aces	L 92–96	Ogunbowale (21)	Sabally (11)	Tied (5)	IMG Academy	5–10
16	August 29	Indiana Fever	W 82–78	Ogunbowale (30)	Sabally (11)	Tied (4)	IMG Academy	6–10

September

Game	Date	Team	Score	High points	High rebounds	High assists	Location Attendance	Record
17	September 2	Los Angeles Sparks	L 83–91	Ogunbowale (17)	Sabally (11)	Ogunbowale (5)	IMG Academy	6–11
18	September 4	Minnesota Lynx	L 75–88	Gray (26)	Sabally (6)	Mabrey (5)	IMG Academy	6–12
19	September 6	Washington Mystics	W 101–94 (OT)	Ogunbowale (39)	Sabally (6)	Ogunbowale (4)	IMG Academy	7–12
20	September 9	Seattle Storm	L 95–107	Sabally (25)	Sabally (7)	Harris (5)	IMG Academy	7–13
21	September 11	Chicago Sky	L 88–95	Ogunbowale (38)	Ndour (7)	Mabrey (7)	IMG Academy	7–14
22	September 13	New York Liberty	W 82–79	Ogunbowale (26)	Thornton (10)	Harris (5)	IMG Academy	8–14

2020 season schedule

== Standings ==
#	Team	W	L	PCT	GB	Conf.
1	x – Las Vegas Aces	18	4	.818	–	8–2
2	x – Seattle Storm	18	4	.818	–	8–2
3	x – Los Angeles Sparks	15	7	.682	3	5–5
4	x – Minnesota Lynx	14	8	.636	4	4–6
5	x – Phoenix Mercury	13	9	.591	5	4–6
6	x – Chicago Sky	12	10	.545	6	6–4
7	x – Connecticut Sun	10	12	.455	8	7–3
8	x – Washington Mystics	9	13	.409	9	6–4
9	e – Dallas Wings	8	14	.364	10	1–9
10	e – Atlanta Dream	7	15	.318	11	5–5
11	e – Indiana Fever	6	16	.273	12	4–6
12	e – New York Liberty	2	20	.091	16	2–8

Notes

x – Clinched playoff berth
e – Eliminated from playoffs
Home and Away records not shown, as all games played at a neutral location.
Updated to include results from September 13, 2020

== Statistics ==
Legend
GP	Games played	GS	Games started	MPG	Minutes per game	RPG	Rebounds per game
APG	Assists per game	SPG	Steals per game	BPG	Blocks per game	PPG	Points per game
FG%	Field-goal percentage	3P%	3-point field-goal percentage	FT%	Free-throw percentage	TO	Turnovers per game
PF	Fouls per game		Team leader		League leader

=== Regular season ===
Player	GP	GS	MPG	FG%	3P%	FT%	RPG	APG	SPG	BPG	PPG
Arike Ogunbowale	22	22	34.0	41.2	33.6	85.6	2.8	3.4	1.5	0.0	22.8
Satou Sabally	16	14	28.2	36.8	19.7	87.2	7.8	2.5	0.8	0.9	13.9
Allisha Gray	20	14	26.2	46.4	35.2	83.1	4.2	1.3	1.1	0.3	13.1
Marina Mabrey	18	12	22.4	43.0	41.8	66.7	3.3	2.4	1.4	0.1	10.6
Kayla Thornton	22	14	25.3	42.5	34.7	87.5	5.1	0.8	0.9	0.2	7.3
Tyasha Harris	21	3	19.6	43.3	33.9	63.6	1.2	2.8	0.9	0.1	6.8
Isabelle Harrison	13	11	19.8	44.7	0	78.9	4.6	1.4	0.7	0.4	6.4
Katie Lou Samuelson	22	4	20.0	41.7	31.7	73.3	2.4	1.4	0.7	0.4	5.0
Moriah Jefferson	9	6	16.7	41.9	33.3	58.3	3.1	2.1	0.8	0.2	5.0
Astou Ndour	13	7	11.6	35.1	24.0	0	2.9	0.5	0.2	0.5	3.5
Bella Alarie	22	3	14.0	36.4	7.7	83.3	2.9	0.5	0.6	0.9	2.7
Megan Gustafson	9	0	5.2	28.6	0	66.7	1.2	0.1	0	0.1	1.6

== Awards and honors ==
Recipient	Award	Date awarded	Ref.
Arike Ogunbowale	Peak Performer: Points	September 14, 2020	
Satou Sabally	All-Rookie Team	September 27, 2020	
Arike Ogunbowale	All-WNBA First Team	October 4, 2020	
