= Carolyn Swords =

American basketball player (born 1989)

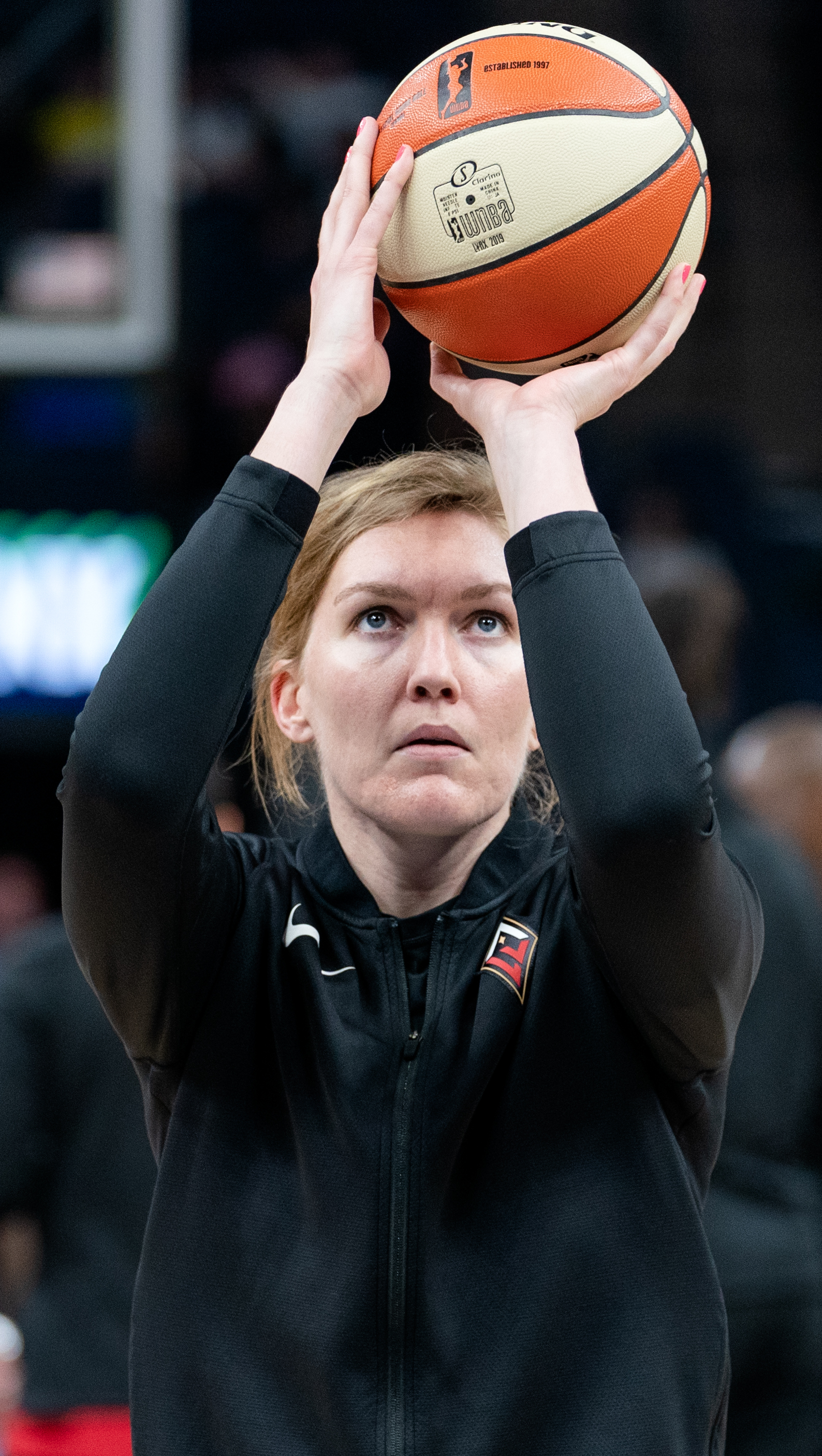
- Swords in 2019

Personal information
- Born: July 19, 1989 (age 37)
- Listed height: 6 ft 6 in (1.98 m)
- Listed weight: 215 lb (98 kg)

Career information
- High school: Lincoln-Sudbury (Sudbury, Massachusetts)
- College: Boston College (2007–2011)
- WNBA draft: 2011: 2nd round, 15th overall pick
- Drafted by: Chicago Sky
- Playing career: 2011–2020
- Position: Center

Career history
- 2011–2013: Chicago Sky
- 2015–2016: New York Liberty
- 2015–2016: Sydney Uni Flames
- 2017: Seattle Storm
- 2018–2020: Las Vegas Aces

Career highlights
- 2× First-team All-ACC (2010, 2011); ACC All-Freshman Team (2008)
- Stats at WNBA.com
- Stats at Basketball Reference

Carolyn Swords (born July 19, 1989) is an American former basketball player.

She previously played for PF Umbertide in Italy and the Sydney Uni Flames in Australia.

== WNBA ==
Swords was selected the second round of the 2011 WNBA draft (15th overall) by the Chicago Sky.

She has played overseas in Istanbul and in Italy with PF Umbertide.

Swords signed with the New York Liberty on February 2, 2015.

On January 30, 2017, Swords was traded to the Seattle Storm in a three-team trade.

On February 1, 2018, Swords signed a free agent contract with the Las Vegas Aces. She briefly retired from WNBA in February 2020 to join the Aces' front office but came out of retirement to resign with the Aces in May 2020 when it was announced that center Park Ji-su would sit out the 2020 season to train in South Korea.

After not playing in the 2021 season, Nike announced its hiring of Swords in January 2022, ending her WNBA career. She subsequently moved to Portland, Oregon.

== The Floor ==
Swords played on the May 20, 2026 episode of The Floor, where she was challenged on her category of Basketball Players, which included both WNBA and NBA players. She won with 21 seconds left on her clock and won 19 pieces of the floor in the final match of the episode. She will be competing in the fifth season's semi-finals. She eventually lost after freezing up on “Cart Path” and “Head Cover”

== Career statistics ==
Legend
GP	Games played	GS	Games started	MPG	Minutes per game	RPG	Rebounds per game
APG	Assists per game	SPG	Steals per game	BPG	Blocks per game	PPG	Points per game
TO	Turnovers per game	FG%	Field-goal percentage	3P%	3-point field-goal percentage	FT%	Free-throw percentage
**Bold**	Career best	°	League leader

=== WNBA ===
==== Regular season ====
Year	Team	GP	GS	MPG	FG%	3P%	FT%	RPG	APG	SPG	BPG	TO	PPG
2011	Chicago	29	4	7.5	.528	–	**.875**	1.8	0.3	0.2	0.2	**0.6**	2.7
2012	Chicago	30	9	11.1	.571	–	.682	3.2	0.3	0.4	0.5	**0.6**	4.0
2013	Chicago	16	2	11.3	**.619**	–	.778	2.6	0.6	**0.5**	**0.8**	0.9	3.7
2015	New York	**34**	22	15.0	.508	–	.809	4.0	0.6	**0.5**	0.7	1.1	5.1
2016	New York	**34**	**34**	**17.5**	.571	–	.686	4.6	0.7	0.2	0.6	1.0	**5.2**
2017	Seattle	30	0	8.7	.545	–	.773	1.5	0.3	0.2	0.2	0.8	2.6
2018	Las Vegas	26	12	14.5	.557	–	**.875**	**4.7**	**0.9**	0.2	0.7	0.8	3.9
2019	Las Vegas	29	4	8.9	.438	–	.846	2.2	0.3	0.2	0.1	**0.6**	2.6
2020	Las Vegas	22	2	17.5	.460	–	.773	4.6	**0.9**	0.2	0.1	0.8	2.9
Career	9 years, 4 teams	250	109	12.5	.534	–	.781	3.3	0.5	0.3	0.4	0.8	3.7

==== Playoffs ====
Year	Team	GP	GS	MPG	FG%	3P%	FT%	RPG	APG	SPG	BPG	TO	PPG
2015	New York	5	5	17.6	73.7	0.0	66.7	4.6	0.8	0.4	0.4	1.0	6.4
2016	New York	1	1	**27.0**	**87.5**	0.0	0.0	3.0	0.0	**1.0**	0.0	1.0	**14.0**
2017	Seattle	1	0	15.0	33.3	0.0	0.0	0.0	0.0	1.0	0.0	3.0	4.0
2019	Las Vegas	3	0	5.0	40.0	0.0	**100.0**	2.0	0.3	0.0	0.0	0.7	2.0
2020	Las Vegas	**8**	**8**	22.1	48.1	0.0	0.0	**6.0**	**1.3**	0.4	**0.6**	**0.6**	3.3
Career	5 years, 3 teams	18	14	17.9	58.5	0.0	66.7	4.4	0.8	0.4	0.4	0.9	4.6

=== College ===
Legend
GP	Games played	GS	Games started	MPG	Minutes per game	FG%	Field goal percentage
3P%	3-point field goal percentage	FT%	Free throw percentage	RPG	Rebounds per game	APG	Assists per game
SPG	Steals per game	BPG	Blocks per game	TO	Turnovers per game	PPG	Points per game
**Bold**	Career high	*	Led Division I

Year	Team	GP	GS	MPG	FG%	3P%	FT%	RPG	APG	SPG	BPG	TO	PPG
2007-08	Boston College	33	-	**30.1**	64.2	0.0	61.5	7.3	**1.4**	0.9	1.2	**2.9**	13.7
2008-09	Boston College	**35**	-	27.4	67.8*	0.0	66.7	9.0	0.9	**1.0**	1.4	2.8	15.4
2009–10	Boston College	32	32	27.2	66.4*	0.0	**79.4**	9.1	1.0	0.9	1.4	2.5	14.4
2010-11	Boston College	33	33	27.3	**71.4***	0.0	75.0	**9.5**	1.2	0.8	**1.5**	2.2	**17.5**
**Career**		133	65	28.0	67.6	0.0	70.8	8.7	1.1	0.9	1.3	2.6	15.3
