= 2020 WNBA season =

- League: Women's National Basketball Association
- Sport: Basketball
- Duration: July 25 – October 6, 2020 (Note: The season was originally scheduled for May 15 – September 20, and was delayed due to the COVID-19 pandemic.)
- Games: 22 (Note: The season was originally scheduled to have 36 games per team, an increase from the 34 games played in the previous season. However, the season was shortened and delayed due to the COVID-19 pandemic.)
- Teams: 12
- TV partner(s): ABC, ESPN, ESPN2, CBS, CBSSN, NBA TV

Draft
- Top draft pick: (United States) Sabrina Ionescu
- Picked by: New York Liberty

Regular season
- Top seed: Las Vegas Aces
- Season MVP: (United States) A'ja Wilson (Las Vegas)
- Top scorer: (Nigeria) / (United States) Arike Ogunbowale (Dallas)

Playoffs
- Finals champions: Seattle Storm
- Runners-up: Las Vegas Aces
- Finals MVP: (United States) Breanna Stewart (Seattle)

WNBA seasons
- ← 2019 2021 →

The 2020 WNBA season was the 24th season of the Women's National Basketball Association (WNBA). The Washington Mystics were the defending champions. Planned changes to the league's schedule included an increase from 34 to 36 regular season games for each team, the introduction of a mid-season Commissioner's Cup tournament, and more games broadcast on ESPN and ABC. This was the first season under a new Collective Bargaining Agreement between the league and the WNBA Players Association. However, on April 3, the season was indefinitely postponed due to the COVID-19 pandemic. Under a plan approved on June 15, the league began a shortened 22-game regular season at IMG Academy in Bradenton, Florida, without fans present on July 25. A'ja Wilson of the Las Vegas Aces was named the league MVP. The Seattle Storm won the 2020 WNBA Finals over the Aces, and Breanna Stewart was named the Finals MVP.

== Offseason ==
=== Collective Bargaining Agreement ===
On January 14, 2020, the WNBA and the WNBA Players Association announced that a new eight-year Collective Bargaining Agreement (CBA) had been signed. Key provisions of the new CBA include:

- The new maximum base salary, for which certain qualified players and those designated as "core players" are eligible, is $215,000, an increase from $117,500 under the previous CBA. Maximum earnings for top players can be over $500,000.
- The new minimum base salary for inexperienced players is $57,000 and for experienced players is $68,000. This is an increase from $41,965 and $56,375 respectively under the previous CBA.
- The "core player" designation, under which teams can retain players otherwise eligible for free agency, remains available to teams. However, while teams could designate a player as such up to four times under the previous CBA, this has been reduced to thrice in the next two seasons and twice thereafter.
- Apart from those players under the "core player" designation, all players who have met contract obligations for five years become unrestricted free agents. This is a decrease from the required six years under the previous CBA.
- The league will enter a 50-50 revenue sharing agreement beginning in 2021, conditional on meeting certain revenue growth targets.
- For road games, players will receive "comfort/economy plus" seats rather than ordinary economy class seats, and will receive individual hotel rooms.
- The league will provide a new paid maternity leave policy, where players will receive their full salaries while on leave. Players with children will be provided an annual $5,000 childcare stipend and two-bedroom apartments. Veteran players are also eligible for up to $60,000 in reimbursements for costs related to family planning.
- The league will institute a new “Diversity in Coaching” initiative to build a pipeline to coaching and offer other paid employment opportunities for players during the offseason. Under the initiative, WNBA players can work on coaching staffs or in front offices of NBA teams without a salary limit, regardless of the WNBA team's ownership structure. (Note: This issue arose in the 2019–20 offseason when the Washington Wizards hired Mystics player Kristi Toliver as an assistant coach. Toliver could not receive a normal NBA assistant's salary because the Mystics and Wizards are owned by the same company; the previous WNBA CBA viewed such an arrangement as a way of getting around the salary cap.)
- The league will create expanded programs to address intimate partner violence and nutrition, but details about these programs were not included in the CBA.
- By the sixth year of the CBA, veteran players (defined for this purpose as those with more than 2 years of WNBA experience) will face season-long suspension for missing the start of training camp. The CBA includes several exceptions to this policy, among them serious injury or illness, maternity leave, national team commitments for non-US players, college graduations, and other significant life events.

=== Schedule changes ===
The WNBA originally planned that each team would play 36 total games in the 2020 season, an increase from the 34 games played in each season since 2003. Teams were to have 18 home and road games each.

The original 2020 season schedule featured the inaugural Commissioner's Cup, an in-season tournament. In the first half of the season between May 15 and July 10, each team would have played its first home and road games against its five conference opponents. These games would have been designated as "Cup games", and the leaders in Cup standings in each conference were would have met in the Commissioner's Cup championship game scheduled for August 14, 2020.

The 2020 WNBA schedule originally included a traditional month-long break in July and August to allow players to participate in the Summer Olympic Games. The 2020 games were, however, postponed till 2021 due to the COVID-19 pandemic, rendering this break unnecessary.

=== Postponement due to the COVID-19 pandemic ===
As with most professional sports leagues, the WNBA season was affected by the COVID-19 pandemic. On April 3, 2020, the WNBA announced that the start of its schedule would also be postponed. The 2020 entry draft took place as originally scheduled on April 17, although it was done remotely. On the originally scheduled opening day, May 15, 2020, Engelbert told ESPN that the players would get their first paychecks on June 1. On June 4, ESPN reported that the WNBA was planning a shortened 22-game regular season to be held at IMG Academy, with players receiving 60% of their salaries. On June 9, The Next reported that many players were unhappy with the reduced salary, and the league revised its plans by June 12 to include full season salaries for players. On June 15, the return-to-play proposal was approved. The playoff format, which included single-elimination first and second-round games and then five-game series for the semifinals and finals, stayed the same and ended in October.

== Draft ==
The New York Liberty had the first pick in the 2020 WNBA draft. The Liberty selected Sabrina Ionescu first overall. The full draft was televised on ESPN in the US and on both TSN2 and SN1 in Canada.

== Transactions ==
=== Retirements ===
- In June 2019, Camille Little announced her retirement after twelve years of playing in the WNBA. She won the WNBA Title in 2010 with the Seattle Storm.
- In September 2019, Sancho Lyttle announced her retirement after fourteen years of playing in the WNBA. Lyttle made the WNBA All-Star game once, and twice lead the league in steals.
- Alana Beard announced her retirement on January 22, 2020, after fifteen years of playing professionally. Beard is a four time WNBA All-Star and two time WNBA Defensive Player of the Year. She also won a WNBA Championship while playing with the Los Angeles Sparks.
- Rebekkah Brunson announced her retirement on February 11, 2020, after fifteen years of playing professionally. Brunson stayed with the Minnesota Lynx as an assistant coach. Brunson had her jersey number 32 retired by the Lynx. Brunson finished her career as a five time WNBA Champion and five time WNBA All-Star. As of her retirement, Brunson was the active WNBA leader in rebounds.
- Carolyn Swords announced she was retiring to join the marketing team of the Las Vegas Aces on February 24, 2020. However, due to the COVID-19 pandemic, she was let go from her position and resumed her career to re-join the Aces. Over her nine-year career, she played for four different teams.

=== Free agency ===
Free agency negotiations started on January 28, 2020, and the signing period began on February 10, 2020.

=== Coaching changes ===
Off-season
Team	2019 season	2020 season	Reference
Indiana Fever	Pokey Chatman	Marianne Stanley	
New York Liberty	Katie Smith	Walt Hopkins	

== Arena changes ==
- In June 2019, it was announced that the Bankers Life Fieldhouse would undergo renovations to add an outdoor plaza and skating area. The Indiana Fever originally announced that they would play home games at the Hinkle Fieldhouse for the 2020–2022 seasons. However, the entire 2020 WNBA season was moved to Bradenton, Florida, and the Fever split their 2021 season between Bankers Life Fieldhouse and Indiana Farmers Coliseum.
- In July 2019, it was announced that Talking Stick Resort Arena would be undergoing renovations and the Phoenix Mercury would be forced to play their home games at Arizona Veterans Memorial Coliseum for the 2020 season. The entire 2020 WNBA season was moved to Bradenton, Florida, and the Mercury returned to Talking Stick Resort Arena (at the time known as Phoenix Suns Arena) in 2021.
- On October 17, 2019, the New York Liberty announced that they would move to the Barclays Center in Brooklyn as their permanent home. In the 2018 and 2019 seasons, the Liberty's primary home venue was the Westchester County Center in White Plains, New York.
- On October 18, 2019, the Atlanta Dream announced that it would move from State Farm Arena in downtown Atlanta to the new Gateway Center Arena in the southern suburb of College Park, Georgia.

== Regular season ==
=== All-Star Game ===
Traditionally, there is no WNBA All-Star Game during an Olympic year, such as 2020. The 2020 Tokyo games were postponed until 2021 because of the COVID-19 pandemic. With the season being held at IMG Academy, the All-Star Game was not played in 2020.

=== Standings ===
#	Team	W	L	PCT	GB	Conf.
1	x – Las Vegas Aces	18	4	.818	–	8–2
2	x – Seattle Storm	18	4	.818	–	8–2
3	x – Los Angeles Sparks	15	7	.682	3	5–5
4	x – Minnesota Lynx	14	8	.636	4	4–6
5	x – Phoenix Mercury	13	9	.591	5	4–6
6	x – Chicago Sky	12	10	.545	6	6–4
7	x – Connecticut Sun	10	12	.455	8	7–3
8	x – Washington Mystics	9	13	.409	9	6–4
9	e – Dallas Wings	8	14	.364	10	1–9
10	e – Atlanta Dream	7	15	.318	11	5–5
11	e – Indiana Fever	6	16	.273	12	4–6
12	e – New York Liberty	2	20	.091	16	2–8

Notes

x – Clinched playoff berth
e – Eliminated from playoffs
Home and Away records not shown, as all games played at a neutral location.
Updated to include results from September 13, 2020

=== Schedule ===
2020 WNBA preseason
Preseason

Date	Time (ET)	Matchup	TV	Result	High points	High rebounds	High assists	Location
Friday, April 17	8:00 p.m.	2020 WNBA draft	USA: ESPN; Canada: TSN2, SN1					Virtually

2020 WNBA regular season
July

Date	Time (ET)	Matchup			TV	Result	High points	High rebounds	High assists	Location
Saturday, July 25	12:00 p.m.	Seattle Storm	@	New York Liberty	USA: ESPN; Canada: TSN1/4	87–71	Clarendon (20)	Stokes (10)	Bird (5)	IMG Academy
Saturday, July 25	3:00 p.m.	Los Angeles Sparks	@	Phoenix Mercury	ABC	99–76	N. Ogwumike (21)	Griner (9)	Gray (7)	IMG Academy
Saturday, July 25	5:00 p.m.	Indiana Fever	@	Washington Mystics	CBSSN, NBC Sports Washington	76–101	Hines-Allen (27)	Hines-Allen (10)	Mitchell (4)	IMG Academy
Sunday, July 26	12:00 p.m.	Connecticut Sun	@	Minnesota Lynx	USA: ESPN; Canada: SN360	69–77	A. Thomas (20)	Fowles (18)	Dantas (5)	IMG Academy
Sunday, July 26	3:00 p.m.	Chicago Sky	@	Las Vegas Aces	ABC	88–86	McCoughtry (25)	Wilson (11)	Vandersloot (11)	IMG Academy
Sunday, July 26	5:00 p.m.	Dallas Wings	@	Atlanta Dream	CBSSN	95–105	Billings (30)	Billings (13)	Carter (8)	IMG Academy
Tuesday, July 28	7:00 p.m.	Washington Mystics	@	Connecticut Sun	NBA TV, NESN+, NBC Sports Washington	94–89	Bonner (29)	A. Thomas (11)	Meesseman (8)	IMG Academy
Tuesday, July 28	9:00 p.m.	Los Angeles Sparks	@	Chicago Sky	NBA TV, WCIU, Spectrum Sportsnet	78–96	Tied (21)	Tied (9)	Vandersloot (10)	IMG Academy
Tuesday, July 28	10:00 p.m.	Minnesota Lynx	@	Seattle Storm	CBSSN, JoeTV, Fox Sports North Plus	66–90	Tied (18)	Fowles (11)	Loyd (6)	IMG Academy
Wednesday, July 29	7:00 p.m.	Phoenix Mercury	@	Indiana Fever	NBA TV	100–106	Hartley (26)	McCowan (13)	3 tied (5)	IMG Academy
Wednesday, July 29	8:00 p.m.	New York Liberty	@	Dallas Wings	CBSSN	80–93	Ionescu (33)	Zahui B. (11)	Ionescu (7)	IMG Academy
Wednesday, July 29	10:00 p.m.	Atlanta Dream	@	Las Vegas Aces	CBSSN, MYLVTV	70–100	Wilson (21)	Wilson (11)	Tied (4)	IMG Academy
Thursday, July 30	6:00 p.m.	Seattle Storm	@	Washington Mystics	USA: ESPN; Canada: SN360	71–89	Atkins (22)	Stewart (10)	Mitchell (6)	IMG Academy
Thursday, July 30	8:00 p.m.	Chicago Sky	@	Minnesota Lynx	NBA TV, Fox Sports North, WCIU	81–83	Collier (20)	Stevens (11)	DeShields (5)	IMG Academy
Thursday, July 30	10:00 p.m.	Connecticut Sun	@	Los Angeles Sparks	ESPN	76–81	Bonner (34)	A. Thomas (18)	A. Thomas (8)	IMG Academy
Friday, July 31	7:00 p.m.	New York Liberty	@	Atlanta Dream	USA: NBA TV, Fox Sports Southeast; Canada: TSN2, NBA TV Canada	78–84	Laney (30)	Billings (15)	Clarendon (5)	IMG Academy
Friday, July 31	8:00 p.m.	Indiana Fever	@	Dallas Wings	CBSSN	73–76	Sabally (23)	Sabally (17)	Allemand (11)	IMG Academy
Friday, July 31	10:00 p.m.	Las Vegas Aces	@	Phoenix Mercury	CBSSN, MYLVTV	95–102	Tied (22)	Turner (9)	Taurasi (10)	IMG Academy

August

Date	Time (ET)	Matchup			TV	Result	High points	High rebounds	High assists	Location
Saturday, August 1	4:00 p.m.	Minnesota Lynx	@	Connecticut Sun	USA: NBA TV, NESN, Fox Sports North; Canada: NBA TV Canada	78–69	Bonner (28)	Fowles (13)	Tied (4)	IMG Academy
Saturday, August 1	6:00 p.m.	Washington Mystics	@	Chicago Sky	USA: NBA TV, WCIU, NBC Sports Washington; Canada: NBA TV Canada	86–88	Atkins (24)	Hines-Allen (12)	Vandersloot (8)	IMG Academy
Saturday, August 1	8:00 p.m.	Los Angeles Sparks	@	Seattle Storm	CBSSN, JoeTV, Spectrum Sportsnet	75–81	Stewart (21)	Parker (12)	Clark (6)	IMG Academy
Sunday, August 2	1:00 p.m.	Phoenix Mercury	@	New York Liberty	USA: ESPN; Canada: TSN4	96–67	Hartley (27)	Turner (11)	Taurasi (9)	IMG Academy
Sunday, August 2	3:30 p.m.	Atlanta Dream	@	Indiana Fever	USA: NBA TV, Fox Sports South; Canada: NBA TV Canada	77–93	K. Mitchell (23)	Billings (8)	Allemand (9)	IMG Academy
Sunday, August 2	6:00 p.m.	Dallas Wings	@	Las Vegas Aces	USA: ESPN2; Canada: NBA TV Canada	70–79	Ogunbowale (20)	Tied (8)	Hamby (4)	IMG Academy
Tuesday, August 4	6:00 p.m.	Dallas Wings	@	Chicago Sky	WCIU, Fox Sports Southwest Plus	79–82	Ogunbowale (26)	Stevens (10)	Vandersloot (10)	IMG Academy
Tuesday, August 4	7:00 p.m.	Phoenix Mercury	@	Atlanta Dream	ESPN2	81–74	Carter (26)	C. Williams (9)	Taurasi (6)	IMG Academy
Tuesday, August 4	9:00 p.m.	Connecticut Sun	@	Seattle Storm	USA: ESPN2; Canada: NBA TV Canada	74–87	Stewart (22)	A. Thomas (13)	Canada (6)	IMG Academy
Wednesday, August 5	7:00 p.m.	Minnesota Lynx	@	New York Liberty	CBSSN, Fox Sports North Plus	92–66	Carleton (25)	Stokes (8)	Clarendon (6)	IMG Academy
Wednesday, August 5	8:00 p.m.	Las Vegas Aces	@	Washington Mystics	USA: NBA TV, NBC Sports Washington, MYLVTV; Canada: NBA TV Canada	83–77	Meesseman (24)	Tied (13)	Mitchell (4)	IMG Academy
Wednesday, August 5	10:00 p.m.	Indiana Fever	@	Los Angeles Sparks	Spectrum Sportsnet	75–86	K. Mitchell (24)	Ca. Parker (11)	Tied (5)	IMG Academy
Thursday, August 6	6:00 p.m.	Seattle Storm	@	Atlanta Dream	ESPN2	93–92	Carter (35)	C. Williams (10)	Carter (7)	IMG Academy
Thursday, August 6	8:00 p.m.	Connecticut Sun	@	Dallas Wings	NBA TV, Fox Sports Southwest Plus, NESN	91–68	Tied (17)	A. Thomas (10)	J. Thomas (9)	IMG Academy
Thursday, August 6	10:00 p.m.	Chicago Sky	@	Phoenix Mercury	USA: ESPN2; Canada: TSN5, NBA TV Canada	86–96	Tied (22)	Griner (8)	Vandersloot (8)	IMG Academy
Friday, August 7	6:00 p.m.	Indiana Fever	@	Minnesota Lynx	Fox Sports North Plus	80–87	Brown (26)	McCowan (12)	Brown (9)	IMG Academy
Friday, August 7	7:00 p.m.	New York Liberty	@	Washington Mystics	USA: ESPN2; Canada: TSN2	74–66	Powers (20)	Zahui B. (14)	Clarendon (6)	IMG Academy
Friday, August 7	9:00 p.m.	Los Angeles Sparks	@	Las Vegas Aces	ESPN2	82–86	Wilson (26)	Ca. Parker (20)	McCoughtry (5)	IMG Academy
Saturday, August 8	12:00 p.m.	Atlanta Dream	@	Dallas Wings	USA: ESPN2; Canada: SN1, NBA TV Canada	75–85	Ogunbowale (24)	Jefferson (10)	Ogunbowale (6)	IMG Academy
Saturday, August 8	3:00 p.m.	Phoenix Mercury	@	Seattle Storm	USA: ABC; Canada: TSN2	68–74	Tied (20)	Howard (10)	Canada (10)	IMG Academy
Saturday, August 8	5:00 p.m.	Chicago Sky	@	Connecticut Sun	USA: NBA TV, NESN+, WCIU; Canada: NBA TV Canada	100–93	Tied (22)	Copper (7)	Vandersloot (11)	IMG Academy
Sunday, August 9	3:00 p.m.	Minnesota Lynx	@	Los Angeles Sparks	ESPN	81–97	Dangerfield (29)	Ca. Parker (10)	Ca. Parker (9)	IMG Academy
Sunday, August 9	5:00 p.m.	Las Vegas Aces	@	New York Liberty	YES	78–76	Wilson (31)	Stokes (12)	Clarendon (8)	IMG Academy
Sunday, August 9	7:00 p.m.	Washington Mystics	@	Indiana Fever	ESPN2	84–91	K. Mitchell (29)	McCowan (11)	Tied (5)	IMG Academy
Monday, August 10	6:00 p.m.	Connecticut Sun	@	Atlanta Dream	Fox Sports Southeast	93–82	A. Thomas (21)	Bonner (9)	J. Thomas (7)	IMG Academy
Monday, August 10	7:00 p.m.	Phoenix Mercury	@	Dallas Wings	USA: ESPN2; Canada: TSN2	91–79	Diggins-Smith (26)	Griner (13)	Diggins-Smith (7)	IMG Academy
Monday, August 10	9:00 p.m.	Chicago Sky	@	Seattle Storm	USA: ESPN2; Canada: TSN2	71–89	Stewart (25)	Howard (7)	Vandersloot (9)	IMG Academy
Tuesday, August 11	7:00 p.m.	Las Vegas Aces	@	Indiana Fever	USA: ESPN2; Canada: NBA TV Canada	98–79	Tied (20)	Wislon (11)	Allemand (6)	IMG Academy
Tuesday, August 11	9:00 p.m.	Washington Mystics	@	Minnesota Lynx	ESPN2	48–68	Fowles (16)	Fowles (13)	Dangerfield (4)	IMG Academy
Tuesday, August 11	10:00 p.m.	New York Liberty	@	Los Angeles Sparks	USA: Spectrum Sportsnet; Canada: TSN5	78–93	J. Jones (24)	Zahui B. (10)	Clarendon (5)	IMG Academy
Wednesday, August 12	7:00 p.m.	Dallas Wings	@	Connecticut Sun	CBSSN	66–70	Ogunbowale (19)	Sabally (9)	Tied (4)	IMG Academy
Wednesday, August 12	9:00 p.m.	Phoenix Mercury	@	Chicago Sky	WCIU, Fox Sports Arizona	71–89	Quigley (20)	Tied (9)	Vandersloot (5)	IMG Academy
Wednesday, August 12	10:00 p.m.	Atlanta Dream	@	Seattle Storm	Twitter, JoeTV	63–100	Tied (20)	Stewart (9)	Canada(10)	IMG Academy
Thursday, August 13	6:00 p.m.	Indiana Fever	@	New York Liberty	USA: YES, Fox Sports Indiana; Canada: TSN3	86–79	Nurse (21)	McCowan (13)	Allemand (5)	IMG Academy
Thursday, August 13	7:00 p.m.	Los Angeles Sparks	@	Washington Mystics	ESPN	81–64	Atkins (20)	Meesseman (11)	Tied (5)	IMG Academy
Thursday, August 13	9:00 p.m.	Minnesota Lynx	@	Las Vegas Aces	USA: ESPN; Canada: TSN3	77–87	Wilson (23)	Collier (14)	Tied (7)	IMG Academy
Friday, August 14	7:00 p.m.	Connecticut Sun	@	Chicago Sky	Twitter, WCIU	77–74	Bonner (19)	A. Thomas (10)	A. Thomas (8)	IMG Academy
Friday, August 14	8:00 p.m.	Seattle Storm	@	Dallas Wings	USA: NBA TV; Canada: NBA TV Canada	83–65	Ogunbowale (22)	Tied (8)	Bird (5)	IMG Academy
Friday, August 14	10:00 p.m.	Atlanta Dream	@	Phoenix Mercury	Fox Sports Arizona Plus, Fox Sports Southeast	80–96	Hartley (24)	C. Williams (14)	Dietrick (7)	IMG Academy
Saturday, August 15	12:00 p.m.	Washington Mystics	@	Las Vegas Aces	USA: ESPN; Canada: SN1	73–88	Atkins (17)	Meesseman (9)	Robinson (7)	IMG Academy
Saturday, August 15	2:00 p.m.	Los Angeles Sparks	@	Indiana Fever	USA: ESPN; Canada: NBA TV Canada	90–76	K. Mitchell (25)	T. Mitchell (8)	4 tied (5)	IMG Academy
Saturday, August 15	6:00 p.m.	New York Liberty	@	Minnesota Lynx	CBSSN, Fox Sports North Plus	64–94	Collier (26)	Collier (13)	2 tied (5)	IMG Academy
Sunday, August 16	1:00 p.m.	Dallas Wings	@	Phoenix Mercury	ABC	95–89	Ogunbowale (33)	Taurasi (9)	Hartley (6)	IMG Academy
Sunday, August 16	3:00 p.m.	Seattle Storm	@	Connecticut Sun	ABC	95–72	Stewart (19)	Tied (11)	A. Thomas (6)	IMG Academy
Sunday, August 16	4:00 p.m.	Chicago Sky	@	Atlanta Dream	Fox Sports Southeast, WCIU	92–67	Ch. Parker (17)	Billings (8)	Colson (6)	IMG Academy
Tuesday, August 18	7:00 p.m.	Indiana Fever	@	Connecticut Sun	CBSSN	62–84	Bonner (28)	A. Thomas (11)	Tied (6)	IMG Academy
Tuesday, August 18	9:00 p.m.	Las Vegas Aces	@	Chicago Sky	ESPN2	82–84	Copper (18)	Wilson (8)	Vandersloot (15)	IMG Academy
Tuesday, August 18	10:00 p.m.	New York Liberty	@	Seattle Storm	JoeTV	64–105	Nurse (21)	Howard (11)	Bird (7)	IMG Academy
Wednesday, August 19	7:00 p.m.	Atlanta Dream	@	Washington Mystics	CBSSN, NBC Sports Washington	91–98	Laney (35)	Billings (12)	Meesseman (10)	IMG Academy
Wednesday, August 19	9:00 p.m.	Dallas Wings	@	Minnesota Lynx	USA: Facebook, Fox Sports North Plus, Fox Sports Southwest Plus; Canada: TSN3/5	84–91	Gray (22)	Thornton (11)	Dangerfield (6)	IMG Academy
Wednesday, August 19	10:00 p.m.	Phoenix Mercury	@	Los Angeles Sparks	Twitter, Fox Sports Arizona Plus, Spectrum Sportsnet	74–83	Taurasi (19)	Ca. Parker (12)	Hartley (9)	IMG Academy
Thursday, August 20	7:00 p.m.	Chicago Sky	@	New York Liberty	CBSSN, YES, WCIU	101–85	Stevens (25)	Stokes (9)	Vandersloot (10)	IMG Academy
Thursday, August 20	8:00 p.m.	Seattle Storm	@	Indiana Fever	Facebook, Fox Sports Indiana, JoeTV	85–90	Loyd (35)	McCowan (10)	Tied (6)	IMG Academy
Thursday, August 20	10:00 p.m.	Connecticut Sun	@	Las Vegas Aces	CBSSN, NESN+	78–99	McBride (25)	McCoughtry (8)	Robinson (9)	IMG Academy
Friday, August 21	7:00 p.m.	Los Angeles Sparks	@	Atlanta Dream	Twitter, Spectrum Sportsnet	93–85 (OT)	Johnson (23)	Tied (9)	Laney (11)	IMG Academy
Friday, August 21	8:00 p.m.	Washington Mystics	@	Dallas Wings	USA: Facebook, Fox Sports Southwest Plus, NBC Sports Washington; Canada: NBA TV Canada	92–101 (OT)	Hines-Allen (35)	Hines-Allen (12)	Ogunbowale (9)	IMG Academy
Friday, August 21	10:00 p.m.	Minnesota Lynx	@	Phoenix Mercury	CBSSN, Fox Sports North Plus	90–80	Hartley (24)	Tied (9)	Tied (6)	IMG Academy
Saturday, August 22	3:00 p.m.	Seattle Storm	@	Las Vegas Aces	USA: ABC; Canada: NBA TV Canada	74–82	Stewart (29)	Stewart (18)	Tied (7)	IMG Academy
Saturday, August 22	5:00 p.m.	Indiana Fever	@	Chicago Sky	CBSSN, WCIU	76–87	Copper (26)	Ch. Parker (8)	Vandersloot (9)	IMG Academy
Saturday, August 22	7:00 p.m.	New York Liberty	@	Connecticut Sun	CBSSN	65–82	A. Thomas (25)	Bonner (12)	Bonner (6)	IMG Academy
Sunday, August 23	4:00 p.m.	Atlanta Dream	@	Minnesota Lynx	Twitter, Fox Sports North Plus, Fox Sports Southeast	78–75	Collier (18)	Billings (13)	Laney (10)	IMG Academy
Sunday, August 23	6:00 p.m.	Dallas Wings	@	Los Angeles Sparks	USA: Facebook, Spectrum Sportsnet, Fox Sports Southwest Plus; Canada: SN360	81–84	Sykes (23)	Ca. Parker (14)	Ca. Parker (6)	IMG Academy
Sunday, August 23	8:00 p.m.	Phoenix Mercury	@	Washington Mystics	Facebook, NBC Sports Washington, Fox Sports Arizona	88–87	Taurasi (34)	Turner (17)	Hines-Allen (8)	IMG Academy
Tuesday, August 25	7:00 p.m.	New York Liberty	@	Chicago Sky	CBSSN, WCIU	101–99	Quigley (29)	Zahui B. (12)	Vandersloot (9)	IMG Academy
Tuesday, August 25	9:00 p.m.	Las Vegas Aces	@	Dallas Wings	CBSSN, MYLVTV	96–92	Sabally (28)	Hamby (14)	Tied (5)	IMG Academy
Tuesday, August 25	10:00 p.m.	Indiana Fever	@	Seattle Storm	USA: ESPN2; Canada: NBA TV Canada	74–87	Stewart (27)	McCowan (11)	3 tied (5)	IMG Academy
Friday, August 28	7:00 p.m.	Minnesota Lynx	@	Atlanta Dream	USA: Facebook, Fox Sports Southeast, Fox Sports North Plus; Canada: TSN3	88–79	Dangerfield (23)	Collier (12)	3 Tied (5)	IMG Academy
Friday, August 28	8:00 p.m.	Los Angeles Sparks	@	Connecticut Sun	CBSSN	80–76	Gray (27)	A. Thomas (9)	Ca. Parker (7)	IMG Academy
Friday, August 28	10:00 p.m.	Washington Mystics	@	Phoenix Mercury	CBSSN	72–94	Diggins-Smith (24)	Turner (7)	Taurasi (7)	IMG Academy
Saturday, August 29	12:00 p.m.	New York Liberty	@	Las Vegas Aces	CBSSN, MYLVTV	63–80	Wilson (20)	Zahui B. (21)	Robinson (6)	IMG Academy
Saturday, August 29	2:00 p.m.	Seattle Storm	@	Chicago Sky	USA: ABC; Canada: TSN3	88–74	Stewart (21)	Howard (15)	Tied (9)	IMG Academy
Saturday, August 29	4:00 p.m.	Dallas Wings	@	Indiana Fever	CBS	82–78	Ogunbowale (30)	Sabally (11)	3 Tied (4)	IMG Academy
Sunday, August 30	4:00 p.m.	Connecticut Sun	@	Washington Mystics	Twitter, NBC Sports Washington	76-63	Bonner (20)	Hinnes-Allen (13)	A. Thomas (8)	IMG Academy
Sunday, August 30	6:00 p.m.	Phoenix Mercury	@	Minnesota Lynx	Facebook, Fox Sports North, Fox Sports Arizona Plus	83–79	Diggins-Smith (25)	Turner (15)	Tied (5)	IMG Academy
Sunday, August 30	8:00 p.m.	Atlanta Dream	@	Los Angeles Sparks	Facebook, Spectrum Sportsnet, Fox Sports Southeast	79–84	Carter (26)	Billings (14)	Ca. Parker (7)	IMG Academy
Monday, August 31	6:00 p.m.	Chicago Sky	@	Indiana Fever	CBSSN	100–77	Tied (21)	Tied (11)	Vandersloot (18)	IMG Academy
Monday, August 31	10:00 p.m.	Los Angeles Sparks	@	Minnesota Lynx	CBSSN, Fox Sports North Plus, Spectrum Sportsnet	78–96	Collier (25)	Tied (9)	Carleton (10)	IMG Academy

September

Date	Time (ET)	Matchup			TV	Result	High points	High rebounds	High assists	Location
Tuesday, September 1	7:00 p.m.	Connecticut Sun	@	New York Liberty	CBSSN, NESN+	70–65	Bonner (27)	Bonner (12)	A. Thomas (4)	IMG Academy
Tuesday, September 1	8:00 p.m.	Indiana Fever	@	Atlanta Dream	Facebook, Fox Sports South, Fox Sports Indiana	90–102	Tied (22)	Achonwa (9)	Carter (6)	IMG Academy
Tuesday, September 1	10:00 p.m.	Phoenix Mercury	@	Las Vegas Aces	Facebook, MYLVTV, Fox Sports Arizona Plus	92–85	Taurasi (32)	Tied (13)	McBride (9)	IMG Academy
Wednesday, September 2	7:00 p.m.	Minnesota Lynx	@	Chicago Sky	Facebook, WCIU, Fox Sports North Plus	86–83	Dantas (28)	Ch. Parker (15)	Vandersloot (12)	IMG Academy
Wednesday, September 2	8:00 p.m.	Los Angeles Sparks	@	Dallas Wings	CBSSN, Spectrum Sportsnet	91–83	Ca. Parker (22)	Sabally (11)	Ca. Parker (6)	IMG Academy
Wednesday, September 2	10:00 p.m.	Washington Mystics	@	Seattle Storm	CBSSN, JoeTV, NBC Sports Washington	64–71	Meesseeman (17)	Stewart (14)	Tied (5)	IMG Academy
Thursday, September 3	6:30 p.m.	Atlanta Dream	@	New York Liberty	CBSSN, YES	62-56	C. Williams (15)	C. Williams (13)	Zahui B. (4)	IMG Academy
Thursday, September 3	8:00 p.m.	Las Vegas Aces	@	Connecticut Sun	Twitter, MYLVTV	93-78	Wilson (24)	Mompremier (16)	Tied (5)	IMG Academy
Thursday, September 3	10:00 p.m.	Indiana Fever	@	Phoenix Mercury	Facebook, Fox Sports Indiana	81-105	Diggins-Smith (28)	Turner (12)	Diggins-Smith (8)	IMG Academy
Friday, September 4	7:00 p.m.	Chicago Sky	@	Washington Mystics	Twitter, NBC Sports Washington, WCIU	69-79	Mitchell (20)	Tied (10)	Mitchell (12)	IMG Academy
Friday, September 4	8:00 p.m.	Minnesota Lynx	@	Dallas Wings	Facebook, Fox Sports Southwest Plus, Fox Sports North Plus	88-75	A. Gray (26)	Collier (14)	Tied (5)	IMG Academy
Friday, September 4	10:00 p.m.	Seattle Storm	@	Los Angeles Sparks	USA: Facebook, Spectrum Sportsnet, JoeTV; Canada: TSN2	90-89	Tied (25)	Stewart (8)	Stewart (9)	IMG Academy
Saturday, September 5	4:00 p.m.	Connecticut Sun	@	Indiana Fever	USA: Facebook, Fox Sports Indiana; Canada: SN360	96-77	Bonner (26)	5 Tied (6)	Allemand (8)	IMG Academy
Saturday, September 5	6:00 p.m.	Las Vegas Aces	@	Atlanta Dream	Facebook, Fox Sports Southeast, MYLVTV	89-79	Tied (21)	Wilson (8)	Tied (6)	IMG Academy
Saturday, September 5	8:00 p.m.	New York Liberty	@	Phoenix Mercury	Twitter	67-83	Diggins-Smith (30)	Tied (13)	Turner (4)	IMG Academy
Sunday, September 6	4:00 p.m.	Dallas Wings	@	Washington Mystics	Twitter, NBC Sports Washington, Fox Sports Southwest Plus	101-94 (OT)	Ogunbowale (39)	Hines-Allen (10)	Mitchell (9)	IMG Academy
Sunday, September 6	6:00 p.m.	Seattle Storm	@	Minnesota Lynx	USA: Facebook, Fox Sports North, JoeTV; Canada: NBA TV Canada	103-88	Dantas (22)	Dantas (9)	Tied (7)	IMG Academy
Sunday, September 6	8:00 p.m.	Chicago Sky	@	Los Angeles Sparks	CBSSN, Spectrum Sportsnet, WCIU	80-86	Tied (24)	Ca. Parker (15)	Vandersloot (15)	IMG Academy
Monday, September 7	6:00 p.m.	Connecticut Sun	@	Phoenix Mercury	CBSSN, NESN	85–70	Bonner (25)	A. Thomas (9)	A. Thomas (9)	IMG Academy
Tuesday, September 8	7:00 p.m.	Los Angeles Sparks	@	New York Liberty	CBSSN, Spectrum Sportsnet	96-70	Tied (20)	Tied (8)	Ca. Parker (7)	IMG Academy
Tuesday, September 8	8:00 p.m.	Minnesota Lynx	@	Washington Mystics	ESPN2	86-89	Hines-Allen (26)	Collier (11)	Mitchell (10)	IMG Academy
Tuesday, September 8	10:00 p.m.	Indiana Fever	@	Las Vegas Aces	ESPN2	86–92	K. Mitchell (24)	Wilson (16)	Allemand (8)	IMG Academy
Wednesday, September 9	7:00 p.m.	Phoenix Mercury	@	Connecticut Sun	Facebook, Fox Sports Arizona Plus	100–95	Diggins-Smith (33)	Turner (21)	3 tied (5)	IMG Academy
Wednesday, September 9	8:00 p.m.	Atlanta Dream	@	Chicago Sky	CBSSN, WCIU	97–89	Laney (24)	Vandersloot (11)	Tied (5)	IMG Academy
Wednesday, September 9	10:00 p.m.	Dallas Wings	@	Seattle Storm	CBSSN, JoeTV	95–107	Sabally (25)	Stewart (11)	Bird (9)	IMG Academy
Thursday, September 10	7:00 p.m.	New York Liberty	@	Indiana Fever	CBSSN	75-85	Dupree (22)	J. Jones (10)	Dupree (7)	IMG Academy
Thursday, September 10	8:00 p.m.	Las Vegas Aces	@	Minnesota Lynx	USA: ESPN2; Canada: NBA TV Canada	104-89	Dangerfield (24)	Tied (11)	3 Tied (6)	IMG Academy
Thursday, September 10	10:00 p.m.	Washington Mystics	@	Los Angeles Sparks	CBSSN, Spectrum Sportsnet, NBC Sports Washington	80–72	Hines-Allen (30)	Ca. Parker (17)	Mitchell (9)	IMG Academy
Friday, September 11	7:00 p.m.	Atlanta Dream	@	Connecticut Sun	Facebook, Fox Sports Southeast	82–75	Carter (22)	Laney (10)	3 tied (4)	IMG Academy
Friday, September 11	8:00 p.m.	Chicago Sky	@	Dallas Wings	CBSSN, WCIU	95–88	Ogunbowale (38)	Hebard (8)	Vandersloot (12)	IMG Academy
Friday, September 11	10:00 p.m.	Seattle Storm	@	Phoenix Mercury	CBSSN, JoeTV	83–60	Walker-Kimbrough (24)	Turner (11)	Peddy (6)	IMG Academy
Saturday, September 12	12:00 p.m.	Washington Mystics	@	New York Liberty	USA: NBA TV, NBC Sports Washington; Canada: TSN5	75–58	Hines-Allen (25)	Hines-Allen (11)	Meesseman (7)	IMG Academy
Saturday, September 12	3:00 p.m.	Las Vegas Aces	@	Los Angeles Sparks	USA: NBA TV, Spectrum Sportsnet, MYLVTV; Canada: NBA TV Canada	84–70	N. Ogwumike (24)	Ca. Parker (10)	Gray (11)	IMG Academy
Saturday, September 12	6:00 p.m.	Minnesota Lynx	@	Indiana Fever	Fox Sports North	98–86	Banham (29)	McCowan (9)	Banham (10)	IMG Academy
Sunday, September 13	12:00 p.m.	Dallas Wings	@	New York Liberty	CBSSN, YES	82–79	Ogunbowale (26)	Tied (10)	Nurse (7)	IMG Academy
Sunday, September 13	3:00 p.m.	Las Vegas Aces	@	Seattle Storm	USA: ABC; Canada: TSN2	86–84	Loyd (30)	Russell (11)	Hamby (8)	IMG Academy
Sunday, September 13	5:00 p.m.	Washington Mystics	@	Atlanta Dream	USA: Facebook, Fox Sports Southeast; Canada: SN360	85–78	Laney (27)	C. Williams (11)	Meesseman (7)	IMG Academy

2020 WNBA postseason
First Round

Date	Time (ET)	Matchup			TV	Result	High points	High rebounds	High assists	Location
Tuesday, September 15	7:00 p.m.	Connecticut Sun	@	Chicago Sky	USA: ESPN2; Canada: TSN1/4	94–81	A. Thomas (28)	A. Thomas (13)	A. Thomas (8)	IMG Academy
Tuesday, September 15	9:00 p.m.	Washington Mystics	@	Phoenix Mercury	USA: ESPN2; Canada: TSN1/4	84–85	Mitchell (25)	Turner (11)	Taurasi (6)	IMG Academy

Second Round

Date	Time (ET)	Matchup			TV	Result	High points	High rebounds	High assists	Location
Thursday, September 17	7:00 p.m.	Phoenix Mercury	@	Minnesota Lynx	USA: ESPN2; Canada: TSN5, NBA TV Canada	79–80	Taurasi (28)	Turner (14)	Taurasi (9)	IMG Academy
Thursday, September 17	9:00 p.m.	Connecticut Sun	@	Los Angeles Sparks	USA: ESPN2; Canada: SN360	73–59	Ca. Parker (22)	Ca. Parker (14)	J. Thomas (6)	IMG Academy

Semifinals

Date	Time (ET)	Matchup			TV	Result	High points	High rebounds	High assists	Location
Sunday, September 20	1:00 p.m.	Connecticut Sun	@	Las Vegas Aces	USA: ESPN; Canada: TSN2	87–62	J. Thomas (31)	Wilson (9)	A. Thomas (5)	IMG Academy
Tuesday, September 22	7:00 p.m.	Connecticut Sun	@	Las Vegas Aces	USA: ESPN2; Canada: TSN5	75–83	Wilson (29)	Mompremier (9)	Young (5)	IMG Academy
Tuesday, September 22	9:00 p.m.	Minnesota Lynx	@	Seattle Storm	USA: ESPN2; Canada: TSN5	86–88	Tied (25)	Stewart (10)	Bird (8)	IMG Academy
Thursday, September 24	7:30 p.m.	Minnesota Lynx	@	Seattle Storm	USA: ESPN2; Canada: TSN2	79–89	Dantas (23)	Stewart (8)	Tied (7)	IMG Academy
Thursday, September 24	9:30 p.m.	Las Vegas Aces	@	Connecticut Sun	USA: ESPN2; Canada: SN360	68–77	A. Thomas (23)	Tied (12)	Young (7)	IMG Academy
Sunday, September 27	1:00 p.m.	Las Vegas Aces	@	Connecticut Sun	USA: ESPN; Canada: TSN2	84–75	McCoughtry (29)	Bonner (15)	Tied (6)	IMG Academy
Sunday, September 27	3:00 p.m.	Seattle Storm	@	Minnesota Lynx	USA: ABC; Canada: TSN2	92–71	Stewart (31)	Collier (15)	Bird (9)	IMG Academy
Tuesday, September 29	7:30 p.m.	Connecticut Sun	@	Las Vegas Aces	USA: ESPN2; Canada: TSN1/4/5	63–66	Wilson (23)	Jones (12)	Bonner (6)	IMG Academy

Finals

Date	Time (ET)	Matchup			TV	Result	High points	High rebounds	High assists	Location
Friday, October 2	7:00 p.m.	Seattle Storm	vs.	Las Vegas Aces	USA: ESPN2; Canada: TSN1/4/5	93–80	Stewart (37)	Stewart (15)	Bird (16)	IMG Academy
Sunday, October 4	3:00 p.m.	Seattle Storm	vs.	Las Vegas Aces	USA: ABC; Canada: SN	104–91	Stewart (22)	Tied (8)	Tied (10)	IMG Academy
Tuesday, October 6	7:00 p.m.	Las Vegas Aces	vs.	Seattle Storm	USA: ESPN; Canada: TSN3/5	59–92	Stewart (26)	Swords (10)	Bird (7)	IMG Academy

=== Statistical leaders ===
The following shows the leaders in each statistical category during the 2020 regular season.

Category	Player	Team	Statistic
Points per game	Arike Ogunbowale	Dallas Wings	22.8 ppg
Rebounds per game	Candace Parker	Los Angeles Sparks	9.7 rpg
Assists per game	Courtney Vandersloot	Chicago Sky	10.0 apg
Steals per game	Alyssa Thomas	Connecticut Sun	2.0 spg
Blocks per game	A'ja Wilson	Las Vegas Aces	2.0 bpg
Field goal percentage	Ruthy Hebard	Chicago Sky	68.2% (58/85)
Three point FG percentage	Alysha Clark	Seattle Storm	52.2% (35/67)
Free throw percentage	Tiffany Mitchell	Indiana Fever	95.1% (77/81)
Points per game (team)	Las Vegas Aces		88.7 ppg
Field goal percentage (team)	Chicago Sky		49.1%

== Playoffs ==
The WNBA continued its current playoff format for 2020. The top eight teams, regardless of conference, make the playoffs, with the top two teams receiving a bye to the semi-finals. The remaining six teams play in two single-elimination playoff rounds, with the third and fourth seeds receiving a bye to the second round.

**First round** Single elimination (September 15)
5	**Phoenix Mercury**	**85**
8	Washington Mystics	84
6	Chicago Sky	81
7	**Connecticut Sun**	**94**

**Second round** Single elimination (September 17)
4	**Minnesota Lynx**	**80**
5	Phoenix Mercury	79
3	Los Angeles Sparks	59
7	**Connecticut Sun**	**73**

**Semifinals**; Best-of-5 (September 20–29)
1	**Las Vegas Aces**	**3**
7	Connecticut Sun	2
2	**Seattle Storm**	**3**
4	Minnesota Lynx	0

**WNBA Finals**; Best-of-5 (October 2–11)
1	Las Vegas Aces	0
2	**Seattle Storm**	**3**

Note: Teams re-seeded after each round.

- **Bold** – Game or series winner

== Awards ==
=== Individual ===
Award		Winner	Team	Position	Votes/Statistic
Most Valuable Player (MVP)		A'ja Wilson	Las Vegas Aces	Forward	43 of 47
Finals MVP		Breanna Stewart	Seattle Storm	Forward	
Rookie of the Year		Crystal Dangerfield	Minnesota Lynx	Guard	44 of 47
Most Improved Player		Betnijah Laney	Atlanta Dream	Forward/Guard	25 of 47
Defensive Player of the Year		Candace Parker	Los Angeles Sparks	Forward/Center	16 of 47
Sixth Woman of the Year		Dearica Hamby	Las Vegas Aces	Forward	44 of 47
Kim Perrot Sportsmanship Award		Nneka Ogwumike	Los Angeles Sparks	Forward	21 of 46
Season-Long Community Assist Award		All WNBA Players			
Peak Performers	**Points**	Arike Ogunbowale	Dallas Wings	Guard	22.8 ppg
Peak Performers	**Rebounds**	Candace Parker	Los Angeles Sparks	Forward/Center	9.7 rpg
Peak Performers	**Assists**	Courtney Vandersloot	Chicago Sky	Guard	10.0 apg
Coach of the Year		Cheryl Reeve	Minnesota Lynx	Coach	25 of 47
Basketball Executive of the Year		Dan Padover	Las Vegas Aces	General manager	37 points

=== Team ===
Award		Guard	Guard	Forward	Forward	Center
**All-WNBA**	**First Team**	Courtney Vandersloot	Arike Ogunbowale	A'ja Wilson	Breanna Stewart	Candace Parker
**All-WNBA**	**Second Team**	Diana Taurasi	Skylar Diggins-Smith	DeWanna Bonner	Napheesa Collier	Myisha Hines-Allen
**All-Defensive**	**First Team**	Alysha Clark	Betnijah Laney	Brianna Turner	Alyssa Thomas	Elizabeth Williams
**All-Defensive**	**Second Team**	Ariel Atkins	Brittney Sykes	Breanna Stewart	Napheesa Collier	A'ja Wilson
**All-Rookie Team**		Crystal Dangerfield	Julie Allemand	Chennedy Carter	Jazmine Jones	Satou Sabally

=== Players of the Week ===
Week ending	Eastern Conference		Western Conference		Reference
Week ending	Player	Team	Player	Team	Reference
August 3	Myisha Hines-Allen	Washington Mystics	Breanna Stewart	Seattle Storm	
August 10	Courtney Vandersloot	Chicago Sky	A'ja Wilson	Las Vegas Aces	
August 17	DeWanna Bonner	Connecticut Sun	Napheesa Collier	Minnesota Lynx	
August 24	Courtney Vandersloot (2)	Chicago Sky	Candace Parker	Los Angeles Sparks	
August 31	Alyssa Thomas	Connecticut Sun	Breanna Stewart (2)	Seattle Storm	
September 8	DeWanna Bonner (2)	Connecticut Sun	Skylar Diggins-Smith	Phoenix Mercury	
September 14	Myisha Hines-Allen (2)	Washington Mystics	A'ja Wilson (2)	Las Vegas Aces	

=== Players of the Month ===
Month	Eastern Conference		Western Conference		Reference
Month	Player	Team	Player	Team	Reference
August	Courtney Vandersloot	Chicago Sky	A'ja Wilson (2)	Las Vegas Aces	
September	Myisha Hines-Allen	Washington Mystics	A'ja Wilson (2)	Las Vegas Aces	

=== Rookies of the Month ===
Month	Player	Team	Reference
August	Crystal Dangerfield (2)	Minnesota Lynx	
September	Crystal Dangerfield (2)	Minnesota Lynx	

=== Coaches of the Month ===
Month	Coach	Team	Reference
August	Bill Laimbeer (2)	Las Vegas Aces	
September	Bill Laimbeer (2)	Las Vegas Aces	

== Coaches ==
=== Eastern Conference ===
Team	Head coach	Previous job	Years with team	Record with team	Playoff appearances	Finals Appearances	WNBA Championships
Atlanta Dream	Nicki Collen	Connecticut Sun (assistant)	2	31–37	1	0	0
Chicago Sky	James Wade	UMMC Ekaterinburg (assistant)	1	20–14	1	0	0
Connecticut Sun	Curt Miller	Los Angeles Sparks (assistant)	4	79–57	3	1	0
Indiana Fever	Marianne Stanley	Washington Mystics (assistant)	0	0–0	0	0	0
New York Liberty	Walt Hopkins	Minnesota Lynx (assistant)	0	0–0	0	0	0
Washington Mystics	Mike Thibault	Connecticut Sun	7	130–108	6	2	1

=== Western Conference ===
Team	Head coach	Previous job	Years with team	Record with team	Playoff appearances	Finals Appearances	WNBA Championships
Dallas Wings	Brian Agler	Los Angeles Sparks	1	10–24	0	0	0
Las Vegas Aces	Bill Laimbeer	New York Liberty	2	35–33	1	0	0
Los Angeles Sparks	Derek Fisher	New York Knicks	1	22–12	1	0	0
Minnesota Lynx	Cheryl Reeve	Detroit Shock (assistant)	10	231–109	9	6	4
Phoenix Mercury	Sandy Brondello	Los Angeles Sparks (assistant)	6	118–86	6	1	1
Seattle Storm	Dan Hughes	San Antonio Stars	2	44–24	2	1	1

Notes:

- Year with team does not include 2020 season.
- Records are from time at current team and are through the end of the 2019 season.
- Playoff appearances are from time at current team only.
- WNBA Finals and Championships do not include time with other teams.
- Coaches shown are the coaches who began the 2020 season as head coach of each team.

== Activism ==
In response to the shooting of Jacob Blake in Kenosha, Wisconsin, the Milwaukee Bucks boycotted Game 5 of their series against the Orlando Magic on August 26. Later that day, the NBA announced that in light of the Bucks' decision, all games for the day were postponed. The WNBA joined the protest and postponed their three games that were originally scheduled on Wednesday: Washington Mystics vs. Atlanta Dream; Los Angeles Sparks vs. Minnesota Lynx; Connecticut Sun vs. Phoenix Mercury. Games were again postponed on August 27. Games resumed on Friday, August 28.

== See also ==
- Impact of the COVID-19 pandemic on basketball
