= 2020 Connecticut Sun season =

- Head coach: Curt Miller
- Arena: Originally: Mohegan Sun Arena; Rescheduled to: IMG Academy gymnasiums, Bradenton, Florida

Results
- Record: 10–12 (.455)
- Place: 2nd (Eastern)
- Playoff finish: 7th Seed, Lost in Semifinals to Las Vegas Aces 2–3

The 2020 Connecticut Sun season was the 22nd season for the Connecticut Sun franchise of the Women's National Basketball Association. It will also be the 18th season for the franchise in Connecticut. The season tipped off on July 26, 2020, versus the Minnesota Lynx.

This WNBA season was originally going to feature an all-time high 36 regular-season games. However, the plan for expanded games was put on hold on April 3, when the WNBA postponed its season due to the COVID-19 pandemic. Under a plan approved on June 15, the league held a shortened 22-game regular season at IMG Academy, without fans present, which started on July 24.

The Sun's season started slowly when the team lost its first five games. They recovered to win four of their next five and were 4–7 at the season's halfway mark. The Sun won six of the next nine to secure a playoff spot with two games to go in the season. The Sun last the final two games of the season to finish 10–12. That earned them the seventh seed in the playoffs.

As the seventh seed, the Sun played in the First Round against the sixth seeded Chicago Sky. The Sun won the game 94–81 and advanced to the Second Round. There they faced off against the third seed Los Angeles Sparks. Again, they triumphed as underdogs, this time 73–59. The win saw them advance to the Semifinals, where they matched up against the first seed Las Vegas Aces. The Sun won games one and three of the best-of-five series, but could not close out games four or five, and lost the series 2–3 to end their season.

== WNBA draft ==
Round	Pick	Player	Nationality	School/Team/Country
2	23	Kaila Charles	United States	Maryland
3	35	Juicy Landrum	United States	Baylor

== Trades/Roster Changes ==
Date	Details
February 10, 2020	Re-signed F Jonquel Jones
February 10, 2020	Traded F Morgan Tuck and Connecticut's 1st Round Draft Pick for Seattle's 1st Round Draft Pick
February 10, 2020	Re-signed F Natisha Hiedeman
February 11, 2020	Traded the 7th and the 10th picks in the 2020 WNBA draft and one first-round pick in the 2021 WNBA draft to Phoenix Mercury for F DeWanna Bonner.
February 15, 2020	Re-signed G Bria Holmes
February 19, 2020	Acquired G Briann January and a second round pick in the 2021 WNBA draft in exchange for Courtney Williams
February 24, 2020	Acquired F Kaleena Mosqueda-Lewis in exchange for a second round pick in the 2021 WNBA draft
February 25, 2020	Acquired the Minnesota Lynx's 2nd round pick in the 2021 WNBA draft in exchange for G Rachel Banham.
February 25, 2020	Signed G Jazmon Gwathmey to Training Camp Contract
February 26, 2020	Signed F Valériane Ayayi to Training Camp Contract
March 13, 2020	Signed G Jacki Gemelos to Training Camp Contract
March 14, 2020	Signed F Megan Huff to Training Camp Contract
June 22, 2020	F Jonquel Jones opts to sit out of the 2020 season.
June 23, 2020	Signed F Beatrice Mompremier.
June 25, 2020	Signed G Jacki Gemelos on permanent contract.

== Roster ==
2020 Connecticut Sun roster
Players
Coaches

Pos.	No.	Nat.	Name	Height	Weight	DOB	From	Yrs
G/F	24	(United States)	Bonner, DeWanna	6' 4" (1.93m)	143 lb (65kg)	1987-08-21	Auburn	10
G	17	(United States)	Carson, Essence	6' 0" (1.83m)	163 lb (74kg)	1986-07-28	Rutgers	12
G/F	3	(United States)	Charles, Kaila	6' 1" (1.85m)	167 lb (76kg)	1998-03-23	Maryland	R
G	2	(United States)	Hiedeman, Natisha	5' 8" (1.73m)	135 lb (61kg)	1997-02-10	Marquette	1
G	32	(United States)	Holmes, Bria	6' 3" (1.91m)	170 lb (77kg)	1994-04-19	West Virginia	3
G	20	(United States)	January, Briann	5' 8" (1.73m)	144 lb (65kg)	1987-01-11	Arizona State	11
F/C	42	(United States)	Jones, Brionna	6' 3" (1.91m)	230 lb (104kg)	1995-12-18	Maryland	3
C	35	(Bosnia and Herzegovina)	Jones, Jonquel (injured)	6' 6" (1.98m)	190 lb (86kg)	1994-01-05	George Washington	4
F	1	(United States)	Mompremier, Beatrice	6' 4" (1.93m)	190 lb (86kg)	1996-08-08	Miami (FL)	R
F	23	(United States)	Mosqueda-Lewis, Kaleena	5' 11" (1.8m)	180 lb (82kg)	1993-11-03	Connecticut	5
C	55	(United States)	Plaisance, Theresa	6' 5" (1.96m)	200 lb (91kg)	1992-05-18	LSU	6
F	25	(United States)	Thomas, Alyssa	6' 2" (1.88m)	185 lb (84kg)	1992-04-12	Maryland	6
G	5	(United States)	Thomas, Jasmine	5' 9" (1.75m)	143 lb (65kg)	1989-09-30	Duke	9

Head coach
(United States) Curt Miller (Baldwin Wallace)
Assistant coaches
(United States) Brandi Poole
(United States) Chris Koclanes

Legend

- (C) Team captain
- (DP) Unsigned draft pick
- (FA) Free agent
- (S) Suspended
- Injured

== Game log ==
=== Regular season ===
2020 game log
Total: 10–12
July

Game	Date	Team	Score	High points	High rebounds	High assists	Location Attendance	Record
1	July 26	Minnesota Lynx	L 69–77	A. Thomas (20)	Tied (8)	Tied (4)	IMG Academy; 0	0–1
2	July 28	Washington Mystics	89–94	Bonner (29)	A. Thomas (11)	Bonner (5)	IMG Academy; 0	0–2
3	July 30	Los Angeles Sparks	L 76–81	Bonner (34)	A. Thomas (18)	A. Thomas (8)	IMG Academy; 0	0–3

August

Game	Date	Team	Score	High points	High rebounds	High assists	Location Attendance	Record
4	August 1	Minnesota Lynx	L 69–78	Bonner (28)	Tied (7)	J. Thomas (4)	IMG Academy; 0	0–4
5	August 4	Seattle Storm	L 74–87	Jones (20)	A. Thomas (13)	Hiedeman (5)	IMG Academy; 0	0–5
6	August 6	Dallas Wings	W 91–68	Jones (17)	A. Thomas (10)	J. Thomas (9)	IMG Academy; 0	1–5
7	August 8	Chicago Sky	L 93–100	J. Thomas (22)	A. Thomas (6)	J. Thomas (6)	IMG Academy; 0	1–6
8	August 10	Atlanta Dream	W 93–82	A. Thomas (21)	Bonner (9)	J. Thomas (7)	IMG Academy; 0	2–6
9	August 12	Dallas Wings	W 70–66	Bonner (18)	A. Thomas (7)	Tied (4)	IMG Academy; 0	3–6
10	August 14	Chicago Sky	W 77–74	Bonner (19)	A. Thomas (10)	A. Thomas (8)	IMG Academy; 0	4–6
11	August 16	Seattle Storm	L 72–95	J. Thomas (17)	Jones (11)	A. Thomas (6)	IMG Academy; 0	4–7
12	August 18	Indiana Fever	W 84–62	Bonner (28)	A. Thomas (11)	Tied (6)	IMG Academy; 0	5–7
13	August 20	Las Vegas Aces	78–99	Tied (15)	A. Thomas (7)	A. Thomas (7)	IMG Academy; 0	5–8
14	August 22	New York Liberty	W 82–65	A. Thomas (25)	Bonner (12)	Bonner (6)	IMG Academy; 0	6–8
15	August 28	Los Angeles Sparks	W 80–76	A. Thomas (19)	A. Thomas (9)	J. Thomas (6)	IMG Academy; 0	6–9
16	August 30	Washington Mystics	W 76–63	Bonner (20)	Tied (11)	A. Thomas (8)	IMG Academy; 0	7–9

September

Game	Date	Team	Score	High points	High rebounds	High assists	Location Attendance	Record
17	September 1	New York Liberty	W 70–65	Bonner (27)	Bonner (12)	A. Thomas (4)	IMG Academy; 0	8–9
18	September 3	Las Vegas Aces	L 78–93	Bonner (22)	Mompremier (16)	January (5)	IMG Academy; 0	8–10
19	September 5	Indiana Fever	W 96–77	Bonner (22)	3 tied (6)	J. Thomas (7)	IMG Academy; 0	9–10
20	September 7	Phoenix Mercury	W 85–70	Bonner (25)	A. Thomas (9)	A. Thomas (9)	IMG Academy; 0	10–10
21	September 9	Phoenix Mercury	L 95–100	Bonner (32)	A. Thomas (17)	A. Thomas (5)	IMG Academy; 0	10–11
22	September 11	Atlanta Dream	L 75–82	Bonner (17)	A. Thomas (9)	Hiedeman (4)	IMG Academy; 0	10–12

2020 season schedule

=== Playoffs ===
2020 playoff game log
Total: 4–3
First Round

Game	Date	Team	Score	High points	High rebounds	High assists	Location Attendance	Series
1	September 15	Chicago Sky	W 94–81	A. Thomas (28)	A. Thomas (13)	A. Thomas (8)	IMG Academy	1–0

Second Round

Game	Date	Team	Score	High points	High rebounds	High assists	Location Attendance	Series
1	September 17	Los Angeles Sparks	73–59	A. Thomas (19)	Bonner (13)	J. Thomas (6)	IMG Academy	1–0

Semifinals

Game	Date	Team	Score	High points	High rebounds	High assists	Location Attendance	Series
1	September 20	Las Vegas Aces	W 87–62	J. Thomas (31)	Bonner (8)	A. Thomas (5)	IMG Academy	1–0
2	September 22	Las Vegas Aces	L 75–83	Bonner (23)	Mompremier (9)	J. Thomas (4)	IMG Academy	1–1
3	September 24	Las Vegas Aces	W 77–68	A. Thomas (23)	A. Thomas (12)	J. Thomas (6)	IMG Academy	2–1
4	September 27	Las Vegas Aces	L 75–84	J. Thomas (25)	Bonner (15)	J. Thomas (6)	IMG Academy	2–2
5	September 29	Las Vegas Aces	L 63–66	A. Thomas (22)	Jones (12)	Bonner (6)	IMG Academy	2–3

2020 playoff schedule

== Standings ==
#	Team	W	L	PCT	GB	Conf.
1	x – Las Vegas Aces	18	4	.818	–	8–2
2	x – Seattle Storm	18	4	.818	–	8–2
3	x – Los Angeles Sparks	15	7	.682	3	5–5
4	x – Minnesota Lynx	14	8	.636	4	4–6
5	x – Phoenix Mercury	13	9	.591	5	4–6
6	x – Chicago Sky	12	10	.545	6	6–4
7	x – Connecticut Sun	10	12	.455	8	7–3
8	x – Washington Mystics	9	13	.409	9	6–4
9	e – Dallas Wings	8	14	.364	10	1–9
10	e – Atlanta Dream	7	15	.318	11	5–5
11	e – Indiana Fever	6	16	.273	12	4–6
12	e – New York Liberty	2	20	.091	16	2–8

Notes

x – Clinched playoff berth
e – Eliminated from playoffs
Home and Away records not shown, as all games played at a neutral location.
Updated to include results from September 13, 2020

== Playoffs ==
**First round** Single elimination (September 15)
5	**Phoenix Mercury**	**85**
8	Washington Mystics	84
6	Chicago Sky	81
7	**Connecticut Sun**	**94**

**Second round** Single elimination (September 17)
4	**Minnesota Lynx**	**80**
5	Phoenix Mercury	79
3	Los Angeles Sparks	59
7	**Connecticut Sun**	**73**

**Semifinals**; Best-of-5 (September 20–29)
1	**Las Vegas Aces**	**3**
7	Connecticut Sun	2
2	**Seattle Storm**	**3**
4	Minnesota Lynx	0

**WNBA Finals**; Best-of-5 (October 2–11)
1	Las Vegas Aces	0
2	**Seattle Storm**	**3**

Note: Teams re-seeded after each round.

- **Bold** – Game or series winner

== Statistics ==
=== Regular season ===
Player	GP	GS	MPG	FG%	3P%	FT%	RPG	APG	SPG	BPG	PPG
DeWanna Bonner	22	22	33.3	42.2	25.2	89.5	7.8	3.0	1.7	0.5	19.7
Alyssa Thomas	21	21	32.8	50.0	0	68.6	9.0	4.8	2.0	0.3	15.5
Brionna Jones	21	21	26.1	60.5	100	69.1	5.6	1.0	1.7	0.7	11.2
Jasmine Thomas	19	19	25.5	40.4	33.3	91.3	1.7	4.0	1.3	0.3	10.2
Natisha Hiedeman	22	4	18.5	35.4	35.9	70.0	1.9	1.9	0.4	0	6.1
Kaila Charles	21	7	17.9	41.2	36.7	71.0	2.6	0.9	0.8	0.3	5.4
Briann January	13	10	23.3	29.3	36.7	83.3	1.2	3.4	0.6	0.2	5.0
Bria Holmes	18	4	16.2	35.7	33.3	66.7	1.8	1.1	0.7	0.3	4.9
Kaleena Mosqueda-Lewis	16	0	10.3	29.7	25.5	57.1	1.3	0.3	0.2	0.1	3.4
Essence Carson	11	2	11.2	32.5	28.6	75.0	1.5	0.6	0.4	0.1	3.2
Theresa Plaisance	13	0	6.9	37.9	29.4	83.3	1.0	0.1	0.4	0.2	2.5
Beatrice Mompremier	21	0	8.9	42.6	0	44.4	3.3	0.1	0.2	0.6	2.3

== Awards and honors ==
Recipient	Award	Date awarded	Ref.
DeWanna Bonner	WNBA Eastern Conference Player of the Week	August 17, 2020	
Alyssa Thomas	WNBA Eastern Conference Player of the Week	August 31, 2020	
DeWanna Bonner	WNBA Eastern Conference Player of the Week	September 8, 2020	
Alyssa Thomas	1st Team All-Defense	September 29, 2020	
DeWanna Bonner	All-WNBA Second Team	October 4, 2020	
