= 2020 Phoenix Mercury season =

23rd season for the Phoenix Mercury of the Women's National Basketball Association

- Head coach: Sandy Brondello
- Arena: Originally: Arizona Veterans Memorial Coliseum; Rescheduled to: IMG Academy gymnasiums, Bradenton, Florida

Results
- Record: 13–9 (.591)
- Place: 5th (Western)
- Playoff finish: 5th Seed, Lost in Second Round to Minnesota Lynx

The 2020 WNBA season was the 23rd season for the Phoenix Mercury of the Women's National Basketball Association. The season tipped off on July 25, 2020, versus the Los Angeles Sparks.

During the off-season, it was announced that Talking Stick Resort Arena would be undergoing renovations and the Mercury would be forced to play their home games at Arizona Veterans Memorial Coliseum for the 2020 season.

This WNBA season will feature an all-time high 36 regular-season games. However, the plan for expanded games was put on hold on April 3, when the WNBA postponed its season due to the COVID-19 pandemic. Under a plan approved on June 15, the league is scheduled to hold a shortened 22-game regular season at IMG Academy, without fans present, starting on July 24.

The Mercury's season got off to a slow start, with the team losing its first two games. However, a four-game win streak followed and the Mercury were 4–2. The Mercury only won two of the next seven games and were just under .500. The team then won its next six games to secure a playoff spot. After losing two of their last three games, they qualified for the playoffs as the fifth overall seed.

As the fifth seed, the Mercury played the Washington Mystics in the First Round of the playoffs. The Mercury won that a nail-biter of a game 85–84, and advanced to the Second Round. They faced off against the fourth seeded Minnesota Lynx and were defeated in another close match, 79–80 to end their season.

== Transactions ==
=== WNBA draft ===
Round	Pick	Player	Nationality	School/Team/Country
1	10	Jocelyn Willoughby	United States	Virginia
2	18	Te'a Cooper	United States	Baylor
3	29	Stella Johnson	United States	Rider

=== Trades/Roster Changes ===
Date	Details
February 11, 2020	Traded F DeWanna Bonner to Connecticut in exchange for the 7th and 10th pick in the 2020 WNBA draft in addition to a first-round pick in the 2021 WNBA draft.
February 12, 2020	Traded the 5th and 7th pick in the 2020 WNBA draft in addition to a first-round pick in the 2021 WNBA draft to Dallas in exchange for Skylar Diggins-Smith.
February 13, 2020	Re-signed C Brittney Griner
February 13, 2020	Signed G Bria Hartley
February 19, 2020	Acquired F Jessica Breland and F Nia Coffey in exchange for G Briann January, the 17th pick in the 2020 WNBA draft, and the team's second round pick in the 2021 WNBA draft
February 24, 2020	Signed C Kia Vaughn
April 17, 2020	Acquired G Shatori Walker-Kimbrough from New York in exchange for the draft rights to G/F Jocelyn Willoughby.
July 12, 2020	F Jessica Breland medically excused for 2020 season.

== Roster ==
2020 Phoenix Mercury roster
Players
Coaches

Pos.	No.	Nat.	Name	Height	Weight	DOB	From	Yrs
F	51	(United States)	Breland, Jessica	6' 2" (1.88m)	166 lb (75kg)	1988-02-23	North Carolina	8
F	10	(United States)	Coffey, Nia	6' 1" (1.85m)	182 lb (83kg)	1995-06-11	Northwestern	3
G	9	(United States)	Cunningham, Sophie	6' 1" (1.85m)	170 lb (77kg)	1996-08-16	Missouri	1
G	4	(United States)	Diggins-Smith, Skylar	5' 9" (1.75m)	145 lb (66kg)	1990-08-02	Notre Dame	6
C	42	(United States)	Griner, Brittney	6' 9" (2.06m)	205 lb (93kg)	1990-10-18	Baylor	7
G	14	(France)	Hartley, Bria	5' 8" (1.73m)	148 lb (67kg)	1992-09-30	Connecticut	6
F	12	(United States)	Jenkins, Alisia	6' 1" (1.85m)		1994-02-21	South Florida	R
G	5	(United States)	Peddy, Shey	5' 7" (1.7m)	147 lb (67kg)	1988-10-28	Temple	1
F	11	(Australia)	Smith, Alanna	6' 4" (1.93m)	180 lb (82kg)	1996-09-10	Stanford	1
G/F	3	(United States)	Taurasi, Diana	6' 0" (1.83m)	163 lb (74kg)	1982-06-11	Connecticut	15
F	21	(United States)	Turner, Brianna	6' 3" (1.91m)	170 lb (77kg)	1996-07-05	Notre Dame	1
C	1	(Czech Republic)	Vaughn, Kia	6' 4" (1.93m)	205 lb (93kg)	1987-01-24	Rutgers	10
G	2	(United States)	Walker-Kimbrough, Shatori	5' 9" (1.75m)	140 lb (64kg)	1995-05-18	Maryland	3

Head coach
(Australia) Sandy Brondello (Western Sydney)
Assistant coaches
(United States) Julie Hairgrove (Arizona)
(United States) Chasity Melvin (NC State)
Athletic trainer
(United States) Hannah Breck (Boston University)
Strength and conditioning coach
(United States) Derrick Nillissen (Iowa Wesleyan)

Legend

- (C) Team captain
- (DP) Unsigned draft pick
- (FA) Free agent
- (S) Suspended
- Injured

== Game log ==
=== Regular season ===
2020 game log
Total: 13–9
July

Game	Date	Team	Score	High points	High rebounds	High assists	Location Attendance	Record
1	July 25	Los Angeles Sparks	L 76–99	Taurasi (16)	Griner (9)	Diggins-Smith (6)	IMG Academy; 0	0–1
2	July 29	Indiana Fever	L 100–106	Hartley (26)	Tied (7)	Tied (5)	IMG Academy; 0	0–2
3	July 31	Las Vegas Aces	W 102–95	Tied (22)	Turner (9)	Taurasi (10)	IMG Academy; 0	1–2

August

Game	Date	Team	Score	High points	High rebounds	High assists	Location Attendance	Record
4	August 2	New York Liberty	W 96–67	Hartley (27)	Turner (11)	Taurasi (9)	IMG Academy; 0	2–2
5	August 4	Atlanta Dream	W 81–74	Taurasi (20)	Turner (7)	Taurasi (6)	IMG Academy; 0	3–2
6	August 6	Chicago Sky	W 96–86	Tied (22)	Griner (8)	Taurasi (6)	IMG Academy; 0	4–2
7	August 8	Seattle Storm	L 68–74	Griner (20)	Griner (8)	Taurasi (5)	IMG Academy; 0	4–3
8	August 10	Dallas Wings	W 91–79	Diggins-Smith (26)	Griner (13)	Diggins-Smith (7)	IMG Academy; 0	5–3
9	August 12	Chicago Sky	L 71–89	Tied (15)	Griner (6)	Diggins-Smith (4)	IMG Academy; 0	5–4
10	August 14	Atlanta Dream	W 96–80	Hartley (24)	Griner (8)	Hartley (5)	IMG Academy; 0	6–4
11	August 16	Dallas Wings	L 89–95	Griner (29)	Taurasi (9)	Hartley (6)	IMG Academy; 0	6–5
12	August 19	Los Angeles Sparks	L 74–83	Taurasi (19)	Turner (7)	Hartley (9)	IMG Academy; 0	6–6
13	August 21	Minnesota Lynx	L 80–90	Hartley (24)	Turner (9)	Hartley (5)	IMG Academy; 0	6–7
14	August 23	Washington Mystics	W 88–87	Taurasi (34)	Turner (17)	Hartley (5)	IMG Academy; 0	7–7
15	August 28	Washington Mystics	W 94–72	Diggins-Smith (24)	Smith (8)	Taurasi (7)	IMG Academy; 0	8–7
16	August 30	Minnesota Lynx	W 83–79	Diggins-Smith (25)	Turner (15)	Peddy (5)	IMG Academy; 0	9–7

September

Game	Date	Team	Score	High points	High rebounds	High assists	Location Attendance	Record
17	September 1	Las Vegas Aces	W 92–85	Taurasi (32)	Turner (13)	Tied (7)	IMG Academy; 0	10–7
18	September 3	Indiana Fever	W 105–81	Diggins-Smith (28)	Turner (12)	Diggins-Smith (8)	IMG Academy; 0	11–7
19	September 5	New York Liberty	W 83–67	Diggins-Smith (30)	Turner (13)	Turner (4)	IMG Academy; 0	12–7
20	September 7	Connecticut Sun	L 70–85	Taurasi (19)	Turner (8)	Diggins-Smith (6)	IMG Academy; 0	12–8
21	September 9	Connecticut Sun	W 100–95	Diggins-Smith (33)	Turner (21)	Taurasi (7)	IMG Academy; 0	13–8
22	September 11	Seattle Storm	L 60–83	Walker-Kimbrough (24)	Turner (11)	Peddy (6)	IMG Academy; 0	13–9

2020 season schedule

=== Playoffs ===
2020 playoff game log
Total: 1–1
First Round

Game	Date	Team	Score	High points	High rebounds	High assists	Location Attendance	Series
1	September 15	Washington Mystics	W 85–84	Diggins-Smith (24)	Turner (11)	Taurasi (6)	IMG Academy	1–0

Second Round

Game	Date	Team	Score	High points	High rebounds	High assists	Location Attendance	Series
1	September 17	Minnesota Lynx	79–80	Taurasi (28)	Turner (14)	Taurasi (9)	IMG Academy	0–1

2020 playoff schedule

== Standings ==
#	Team	W	L	PCT	GB	Conf.
1	x – Las Vegas Aces	18	4	.818	–	8–2
2	x – Seattle Storm	18	4	.818	–	8–2
3	x – Los Angeles Sparks	15	7	.682	3	5–5
4	x – Minnesota Lynx	14	8	.636	4	4–6
5	x – Phoenix Mercury	13	9	.591	5	4–6
6	x – Chicago Sky	12	10	.545	6	6–4
7	x – Connecticut Sun	10	12	.455	8	7–3
8	x – Washington Mystics	9	13	.409	9	6–4
9	e – Dallas Wings	8	14	.364	10	1–9
10	e – Atlanta Dream	7	15	.318	11	5–5
11	e – Indiana Fever	6	16	.273	12	4–6
12	e – New York Liberty	2	20	.091	16	2–8

== Playoffs ==
**First round** Single elimination (September 15)
5	**Phoenix Mercury**	**85**
8	Washington Mystics	84
6	Chicago Sky	81
7	**Connecticut Sun**	**94**

**Second round** Single elimination (September 17)
4	**Minnesota Lynx**	**80**
5	Phoenix Mercury	79
3	Los Angeles Sparks	59
7	**Connecticut Sun**	**73**

**Semifinals**; Best-of-5 (September 20–29)
1	**Las Vegas Aces**	**3**
7	Connecticut Sun	2
2	**Seattle Storm**	**3**
4	Minnesota Lynx	0

**WNBA Finals**; Best-of-5 (October 2–11)
1	Las Vegas Aces	0
2	**Seattle Storm**	**3**

Note: Teams re-seeded after each round.

- **Bold** – Game or series winner

== Statistics ==
Legend
GP	Games played	GS	Games started	MPG	Minutes per game	RPG	Rebounds per game
APG	Assists per game	SPG	Steals per game	BPG	Blocks per game	PPG	Points per game
FG%	Field-goal percentage	3P%	3-point field-goal percentage	FT%	Free-throw percentage	TO	Turnovers per game
PF	Fouls per game		Team leader		League leader

=== Regular season ===
Player	GP	GS	MPG	FG%	3P%	FT%	RPG	APG	SPG	BPG	PPG
Diana Taurasi	19	19	28.1	40.9	36.5	91.2	4.2	4.5	1.0	0.4	18.7
Brittney Griner	12	12	31.8	49.7	0	80.9	7.5	3.0	0.3	1.8	17.7
Skylar Diggins-Smith	22	22	30.7	47.4	39.7	90.0	3.3	4.2	0.9	0.5	17.7
Bria Hartley	13	3	24.8	42.0	38.5	80.5	2.9	4.5	1.2	0	14.6
Shatori Walker-Kimbrough	21	10	19.0	42.9	43.1	92.0	1.6	1.5	1.1	0.4	7.3
Brianna Turner	22	22	27.9	57.9	0	64.3	9.0	1.8	1.1	2.0	7.2
Kia Vaughn	22	10	18.9	48.8	0	57.9	3.6	1.5	0.5	0.3	6.1
Alanna Smith	19	0	15.6	42.2	23.3	69.0	3.6	1.2	0.3	0.8	6.1
Sophie Cunningham	21	11	18.9	38.5	23.5	88.0	1.0	0.8	0.5	0.1	5.0
Shey Peddy	8	0	17.6	29.4	10.5	100	3.0	2.4	1.5	0.1	4.0
Alisia Jenkins	2	0	11.5	25.0	0	66.7	1.5	0	0	0	4.0
Nia Coffey	15	1	15.3	42.1	33.3	16.7	2.5	0.8	0.3	0.3	2.7

== Awards and honors ==
Recipient	Award	Date awarded	Ref.
Skylar Diggins-Smith	WNBA Western Conference Player of the Week	September 8, 2020	
Brianna Turner	1st Team All-Defense	September 29, 2020	
Diana Taurasi	All-WNBA Second Team	October 4, 2020	
Skylar Diggins-Smith	All-WNBA Second Team	October 4, 2020	
