= 2020 Minnesota Lynx season =

Sport Season in Minnesota

- Head coach: Cheryl Reeve
- Arena: Originally: Target Center; Rescheduled to: IMG Academy gymnasiums, Bradenton, Florida

Results
- Record: 14–8 (.636)
- Place: 4th (Western)
- Playoff finish: 4th Seed, Lost in Semifinals to Seattle Storm

The 2020 Minnesota Lynx season was the 22nd season for the Minnesota Lynx of the Women's National Basketball Association, and the 11th season under head coach Cheryl Reeve.

The season tipped-off on July 26, 2020, versus the Connecticut Sun.

This WNBA season will feature an all-time high 36 regular-season games. However, the plan for expanded games was put on hold on April 3, when the WNBA postponed its season due to the COVID-19 pandemic. Under a plan approved on June 15, the league is scheduled to hold a shortened 22-game regular season at IMG Academy, without fans present, starting on July 24.

The Lynx' season started strongly, as the team won five of their first six games, with their only loss coming to the Seattle Storm. They won three of the next five to hold a 8–3 record at the halfway mark of the season. The team finished the season with a 3–2 stretch of five games and a 3–3 stretch of the last six games. Their overall 14–8 record earned them the fourth seed in the playoffs.

As the fourth seed, the Lynx earned a bye into the Second Round. They faced off against the Phoenix Mercury, and won a very close game 80–79. With that win, they advanced to face Seattle in the Semifinals. The Lynx lost the first game in the series by two points, and then were defeated by ten points and twenty-one points in games two and three. The three game sweep ended the Lynx' season.

== Transactions ==
=== WNBA draft ===
Round	Pick	Player	Nationality	School/Team/Country
1	6	Mikiah Herbert Harrigan	Anguilla; United Kingdom	South Carolina
2	16	Crystal Dangerfield	United States	Connecticut

=== Trades/Roster Changes ===
Date	Details
February 11, 2020	F Rebekkah Brunson retired and was hired as an assistant coach of the Lynx.
February 25, 2020	Acquired G Rachel Banham from the Connecticut Sun in exchange for a 2nd round pick in the 2021 WNBA draft.
February 29, 2020	Signed F Cecilia Zandalasini
March 6, 2020	Traded the 14th pick in the 2020 WNBA draft and their second round pick in the 2021 WNBA draft to Indiana Fever in exchange for G Shenise Johnson and the 16th pick in the 2020 WNBA draft.
April 17, 2020	Traded F Stephanie Talbot to New York in exchange for the draft rights for G Erica Ogwumike.
May 25, 2020	Waived G Linnae Harper and G Erica Ogwumike
May 31, 2020	Moved G Odyssey Sims to an Inactive List and suspended F Jessica Shepard
June 17, 2020	F Cecilia Zandalasini announces she will be opting out of the season due to COVID-19 and signed F Megan Huff
July 30, 2020	Waived F Karima Christmas-Kelly and signed F Erica McCall
August 6, 2020	Activated G Odyssey Sims and waived F Megan Huff

== Roster ==
2020 Minnesota Lynx roster
Players
Coaches

Pos.	No.	Nat.	Name	Height	Weight	DOB	From	Yrs
C	40	(Canada)	Alexander, Kayla	6' 4" (1.93m)	186 lb (84kg)	1991-01-05	Syracuse	7
G	15	(United States)	Banham, Rachel	5' 9" (1.75m)	172 lb (78kg)	1993-07-15	Minnesota	4
G	4	(United States)	Brown, Lexie	5' 9" (1.75m)	160 lb (73kg)	1994-10-27	Duke	2
G/F	6	(Canada)	Carleton, Bridget	6' 1" (1.85m)	180 lb (82kg)	1997-05-22	Iowa State	1
F	24	(United States)	Collier, Napheesa	6' 2" (1.88m)	181 lb (82kg)	1996-09-23	Connecticut	1
G	2	(United States)	Dangerfield, Crystal	5' 5" (1.65m)	122 lb (55kg)	1998-05-11	Connecticut	R
F	92	(Brazil)	Dantas, Damiris	6' 3" (1.91m)	201 lb (91kg)	1992-11-17	Brazil	5
C	34	(United States)	Fowles, Sylvia (injured)	6' 6" (1.98m)	217 lb (98kg)	1985-10-06	LSU	12
F	21	(United Kingdom)	Herbert Harrigan, Mikiah	6' 2" (1.88m)	152 lb (69kg)	1998-08-21	South Carolina	R
G	42	(United States)	Johnson, Shenise	5' 11" (1.8m)	168 lb (76kg)	1990-12-08	Miami (FL)	7
F	24	(United States)	McCall, Erica	6' 2" (1.88m)	184 lb (83kg)	1995-08-21	Stanford	3
G	1	(United States)	Sims, Odyssey	5' 8" (1.73m)	163 lb (74kg)	1992-07-13	Baylor	6

Head coach
(United States) Cheryl Reeve (La Salle)
Assistant coaches
(United States) Plenette Pierson (Texas Tech)
(United States) Katie Smith (Ohio State)
(United States) Rebekkah Brunson (Georgetown)
Athletic trainer
(United States) Chuck Barta (UW–La Crosse)
Assistant trainer
(United States) Kate Taber (Iowa)

Legend

- (C) Team captain
- (DP) Unsigned draft pick
- (FA) Free agent
- (S) Suspended
- Injured

== Game log ==
=== Regular season ===
2020 game log
Total: 14–8
July

Game	Date	Team	Score	High points	High rebounds	High assists	Location Attendance	Record
1	July 26	Connecticut Sun	W 77–69	Sylvia Fowles (17)	Sylvia Fowles (18)	Damiris Dantas (5)	IMG Academy; No In-Person Attendance	1–0
2	July 28	Seattle Storm	L 66–90	Damiris Dantas (18)	Sylvia Fowles (11)	Napheesa Collier (5)	IMG Academy; No In-Person Attendance	1–1
3	July 30	Chicago Sky	W 83–81	Napheesa Collier (20)	Napheesa Collier (10)	Collier, Johnson (4)	IMG Academy; No In-Person Attendance	2–1

August

Game	Date	Team	Score	High points	High rebounds	High assists	Location Attendance	Record
4	August 1	Connecticut Sun	W 78-69	Sylvia Fowles (21)	Sylvia Fowles (13)	Napheesa Collier (4)	IMG Academy; No In-Person Attendance	3–1
5	August 5	New York Liberty	W 92–66	Bridget Carleton (25)	Carleton, Collier (7)	Rachel Banham (5)	IMG Academy; No In-Person Attendance	4–1
6	August 7	Indiana Fever	W 87–80	Lexie Brown (26)	Brown, Fowles (6)	Lexie Brown (9)	IMG Academy; No In-Person Attendance	5-1
7	August 9	Los Angeles Sparks	L 81-97	Crystal Dangerfield (29)	Damiris Dantas (7)	Lexie Brown (6)	IMG Academy; No In-Person Attendance	5–2
8	August 11	Washington Mystics	W 68–48	Sylvia Fowles (16)	Sylvia Fowles (13)	Crystal Dangerfield (4)	IMG Academy; No In-Person Attendance	6–2
9	August 13	Las Vegas Aces	L 77–87	Napheesa Collier (21)	Napheesa Collier (14)	Damiris Dantas (7)	IMG Academy; No In-Person Attendance	6–3
10	August 15	New York Liberty	W 94-64	Napheesa Collier (26)	Napheesa Collier (13)	Collier, Sims (5)	IMG Academy; No In-Person Attendance	7–3
11	August 19	Dallas Wings	W 91-84	Crystal Dangerfield (21)	Bridget Carleton (9)	Crystal Dangerfield (6)	IMG Academy; No In-Person Attendance	8–3
12	August 21	Phoenix Mercury	W 90-80	Napheesa Collier (20)	Napheesa Collier (9)	Collier, Carleton (6)	IMG Academy; No In-Person Attendance	9–3
13	August 23	Atlanta Dream	L 75–78	Napheesa Collier (18)	Damiris Dantas (9)	Carleton, Dantas, Dangerfield (3)	IMG Academy; No In-Person Attendance	9–4
14	August 28	Atlanta Dream	W 88–79	Crystal Dangerfield (23)	Napheesa Collier (12)	Odyssey Sims (9)	IMG Academy; No In-Person Attendance	10–4
15	August 30	Phoenix Mercury	L 79–83	Crystal Dangerfield (20)	Napheesa Collier (6)	Odyssey Sims (5)	IMG Academy; No In-Person Attendance	10–5
16	August 31	Los Angeles Sparks	W 96–78	Napheesa Collier (25)	Collier, Dantas (9)	Bridget Carleton (10)	IMG Academy; No In-Person Attendance	11–5

September

Game	Date	Team	Score	High points	High rebounds	High assists	Location Attendance	Record
17	September 2	Chicago Sky	W 86–83	Damiris Dantas (28)	Napheesa Collier (9)	Crystal Dangerfield (7)	IMG Academy; No In-Person Attendance	12–5
18	September 4	Dallas Wings	W 88–75	Damiris Dantas (18)	Napheesa Collier (14)	Crystal Dangerfield (5)	IMG Academy; No In-Person Attendance	13–5
19	September 6	Seattle Storm	L 88–103	Damiris Dantas (22)	Damiris Dantas (9)	Odyssey Sims (4)	IMG Academy; No In-Person Attendance	13–6
20	September 8	Washington Mystics	L 86–89	Napheesa Collier (21)	Napheesa Collier (11)	Crystal Dangerfield (7)	IMG Academy; No In-Person Attendance	13–7
21	September 10	Las Vegas Aces	L 89–104	Crystal Dangerfield (24)	Napheesa Collier (11)	Napheesa Collier (10)	IMG Academy; No In-Person Attendance	13-8
22	September 12	Indiana Fever	W 98–86	Rachel Banham (29)	Napheesa Collier (8)	Rachel Banham (10)	IMG Academy; No In-Person Attendance	14–8

2020 season schedule

=== Playoffs ===
2020 playoff game log
Total: 1–3
Second Round

Game	Date	Team	Score	High points	High rebounds	High assists	Location Attendance	Series
1	September 17	Phoenix Mercury	W 80–79	Damiris Dantas (22)	Napheesa Collier (9)	Napheesa Collier (6)	IMG Academy	1–0

Semifinals

Game	Date	Team	Score	High points	High rebounds	High assists	Location Attendance	Series
1	September 22	Seattle Storm	L 86–88	Napheesa Collier (25)	Napheesa Collier (9)	Crystal Dangerfield (6)	IMG Academy	0–1
2	September 24	Seattle Storm	L 79–89	Damiris Dantas (23)	Carleton, Dantas (7)	Crystal Dangerfield (7)	IMG Academy	0–2
3	September 27	Seattle Storm	L 71–92	Napheesa Collier (22)	Napheesa Collier (15)	Dantas & Sims (4)	IMG Academy	0–3

2020 playoff schedule

== Standings ==
#	Team	W	L	PCT	GB	Conf.
1	x – Las Vegas Aces	18	4	.818	–	8–2
2	x – Seattle Storm	18	4	.818	–	8–2
3	x – Los Angeles Sparks	15	7	.682	3	5–5
4	x – Minnesota Lynx	14	8	.636	4	4–6
5	x – Phoenix Mercury	13	9	.591	5	4–6
6	x – Chicago Sky	12	10	.545	6	6–4
7	x – Connecticut Sun	10	12	.455	8	7–3
8	x – Washington Mystics	9	13	.409	9	6–4
9	e – Dallas Wings	8	14	.364	10	1–9
10	e – Atlanta Dream	7	15	.318	11	5–5
11	e – Indiana Fever	6	16	.273	12	4–6
12	e – New York Liberty	2	20	.091	16	2–8

== Playoffs ==
**First round** Single elimination (September 15)
5	**Phoenix Mercury**	**85**
8	Washington Mystics	84
6	Chicago Sky	81
7	**Connecticut Sun**	**94**

**Second round** Single elimination (September 17)
4	**Minnesota Lynx**	**80**
5	Phoenix Mercury	79
3	Los Angeles Sparks	59
7	**Connecticut Sun**	**73**

**Semifinals**; Best-of-5 (September 20–29)
1	**Las Vegas Aces**	**3**
7	Connecticut Sun	2
2	**Seattle Storm**	**3**
4	Minnesota Lynx	0

**WNBA Finals**; Best-of-5 (October 2–11)
1	Las Vegas Aces	0
2	**Seattle Storm**	**3**

Note: Teams re-seeded after each round.

- **Bold** – Game or series winner

== Statistics ==
Legend
GP	Games played	GS	Games started	MPG	Minutes per game	RPG	Rebounds per game
APG	Assists per game	SPG	Steals per game	BPG	Blocks per game	PPG	Points per game
FG%	Field-goal percentage	3P%	3-point field-goal percentage	FT%	Free-throw percentage	TO	Turnovers per game
PF	Fouls per game		Team leader		League leader

=== Regular season ===
Player	GP	GS	MPG	FG%	3P%	FT%	RPG	APG	SPG	BPG	PPG
Crystal Dangerfield	21	19	30.0	47.1	33.3	92.2	2.0	3.6	0.9	0.0	16.2
Napheesa Collier	22	22	34.2	52.3	40.8	82.9	9.0	3.3	1.8	1.3	16.1
Sylvia Fowles	7	7	24.1	60.9	0	82.8	9.7	0.9	0.9	1.1	14.6
Damiris Dantas	22	22	26.6	46.4	4..6	72.7	6.1	2.6	1.1	0.2	12.9
Odyssey Sims	13	7	18.5	40.4	33.3	90.9	2.0	3.5	0.5	0.1	6.9
Rachel Banham	20	1	17.0	46.2	47.2	80.0	1.3	2.4	0.5	0.1	6.9
Bridget Carleton	22	15	25.8	52.0	45.7	64.3	3.5	2.5	0.7	0	6.6
Lexie Brown	17	13	22.0	34.2	26.9	79.2	1.9	2.4	1.8	0	6.4
Shenise Johnson	17	4	12.5	34.1	35.3	89.3	1.9	1.2	0.9	0.1	5.1
Mikiah Herbert Harrigan	21	0	11.1	36.6	42.4	71.4	2.3	0.3	0.4	0.4	3.8
Erica McCall	19	0	9.4	35.6	25.0	81.8	2.5	0.2	0.3	0.4	2.7
Kayla Alexander	16	0	5.6	53.3	0	62.5	0.9	0.2	0.1	0.2	2.3

== Awards and Milestones ==
Recipient	Award/Milestone	Date Awarded	Reference
Napheesa Collier	Western Conference Player of the Week	August 17, 2020	
Napheesa Collier	2nd Team All-Defense	September 29, 2020	
Napheesa Collier	All-WNBA Second Team	October 4, 2020	
Crystal Dangerfield	WNBA Rookie of the Month – August	September 1, 2020	
Crystal Dangerfield	WNBA Rookie of the Month – September	September 15, 2020	
Crystal Dangerfield	Rookie of the Year	September 17, 2020	
Crystal Dangerfield	All-Rookie Team	September 27, 2020	
Cheryl Reeve	Coach of the Year	September 17, 2020	
