= Sunset Lake =

Sunset Lake may refer to a place in the United States:

- Sunset Lake (Orlando, Florida)
- Sunset Lake (Braintree, Massachusetts)
- Sunset Lake (Asbury Park), Asbury Park, New Jersey
- Sunset Lake (New Jersey), Cumberland County, New Jersey
  - Sunset Lake, New Jersey, community on the east side of the lake
- Sunset Lake (Lakes Region, New Hampshire)
- Sunset Lake (Holly Springs, North Carolina)
- Sunset Lake (Portage County, Wisconsin)

== See also ==
- Sunset Lake Floating Bridge, Brookfield, Vermont
