= Zigante =

Zigante or Žigante is a surname. Notable people with the surname include:

- Susana Žigante, American-born Croatian footballer
- Marcel Žigante, Yugoslav and later Croatian professional football manager and former player
- Gretchen Zigante, American former soccer player
