= Cornelia Alice Norris =

American socialite and genealogist

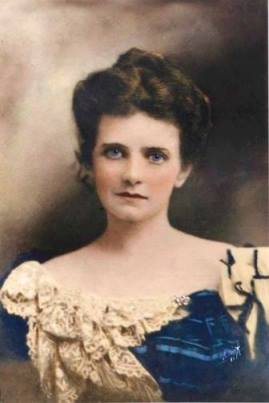

Regent of the Caswell-Nash Chapter of the Daughters of the American Revolution

Personal details
- Born: August 27, 1857 Holly Springs, North Carolina, U.S.
- Died: June 22, 1935 (aged 77) Raleigh, North Carolina, U.S.
- Resting place: Historic Oakwood Cemetery
- Spouse: Matthew Tyson Norris (1879–1915; his death)
- Children: 5
- Occupation: socialite, clubwoman, genealogist

Cornelia Alice Norris (née Norris; August 27, 1857 – June 22, 1935) was an American socialite, clubwoman, and genealogist. Born into an affluent farming family in Wake County, North Carolina, she married Matthew Tyson Norris, a wealthy dry goods merchant and cotton factor, and lived in the Norris-Heartt House, a mansion in downtown Raleigh that was deeded to her by her parents. She was known for her elegant soirées, which were written about in the local papers. Norris was active in women's organizations including the Ladies Auxiliary of the Young Men's Christian Association and Sunday school at First Baptist Church. She was the founding Regent of the Caswell-Nash Chapter of the Daughters of the American Revolution and worked as a genealogist in her later life.

== Biography ==
Cornelia Alice Norris was born in Wake County, North Carolina on August 27, 1857, to Jesse Allen Norris and Amy Ann Adams. Her father was from a wealthy farming family residing in Holly Springs. Her mother's family was from Fuquay-Varina. Her paternal great-grandfather, Pvt. John Norris Jr., was an English colonist who served in the Wake County Militia during the American Revolutionary War. Her grandfather, Needham Norris, was a Baptist minister and the owner of the Norris-Holland-Hare House, a Federal-style farmhouse that is the oldest structure in Holly Springs. She was a relative of the journalist Hoke Norris.

In 1879, she married Matthew Tyson Norris, a dry goods merchant and cotton factor who owned and operated a store in downtown Raleigh and a stall at City Market. Norris House, a large house on North Blount Street in Raleigh, was given to her in 1879 as a wedding present from her parents. Her parents deeded the house exclusively in her name, not her husband's name. The Norrises lived their entire married lives in Raleigh. She and her husband had five children including three daughters.

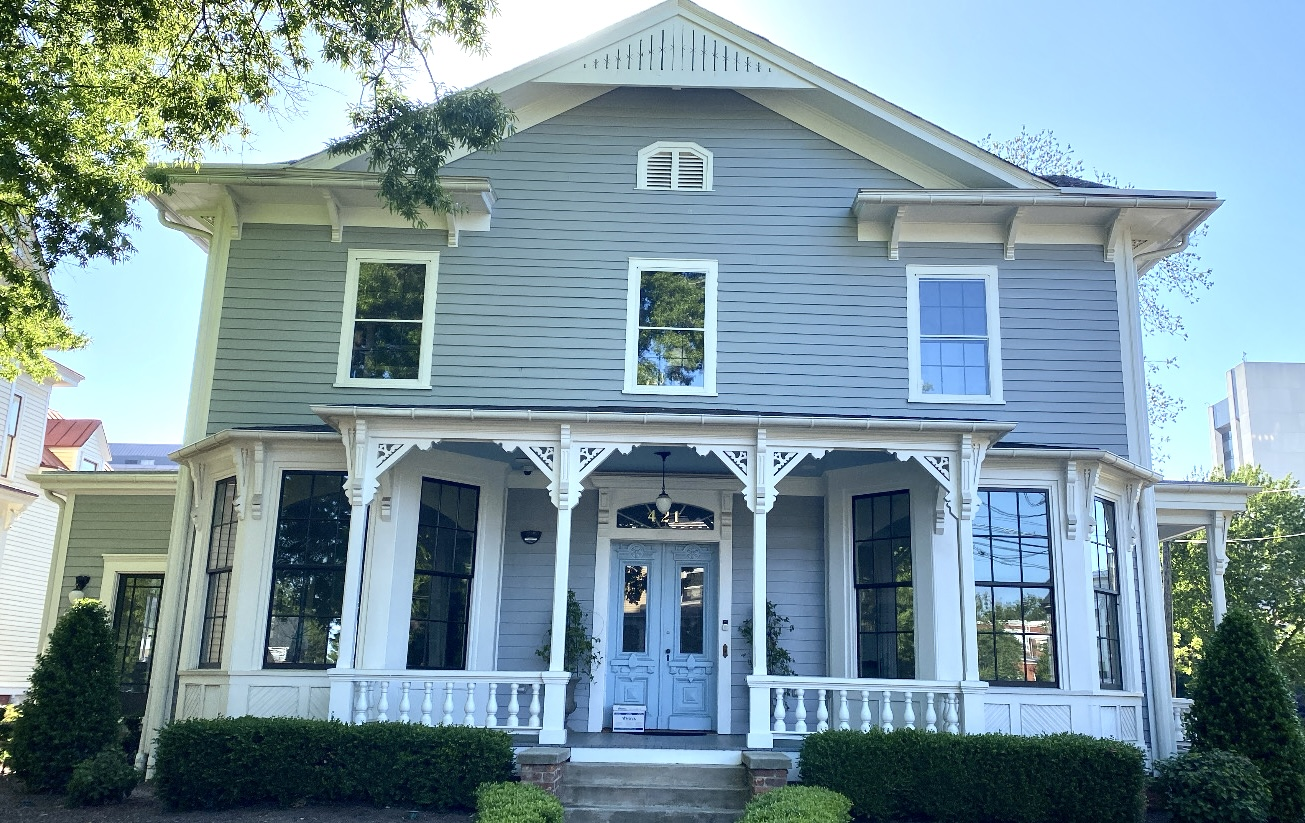
Norris House on North Blount Street

Norris ran the household and cared for her five children. She was a prominent socialite in Raleigh and the local newspapers detailed accounts of her soirées and fashionable parties at her North Blount Street residence.

She was active in various women's organizations including the Ladies Auxiliary of the Young Men's Christian Association. Norris, who was interested in genealogy, was the founding regent of the Caswell-Nash Chapter of the Daughters of the American Revolution. She worked as a genealogist in her later years, assisting clients in tracing their ancestry and family history.

She was an active parishioner and Sunday school student at First Baptist Church.

She was widowed on January 16, 1915. Norris died in Raleigh on June 22, 1935. She was buried at Historic Oakwood Cemetery.
