= Marbles Kids Museum =

Museum for children

Coordinates: 35.7784427°N 78.6362095°W

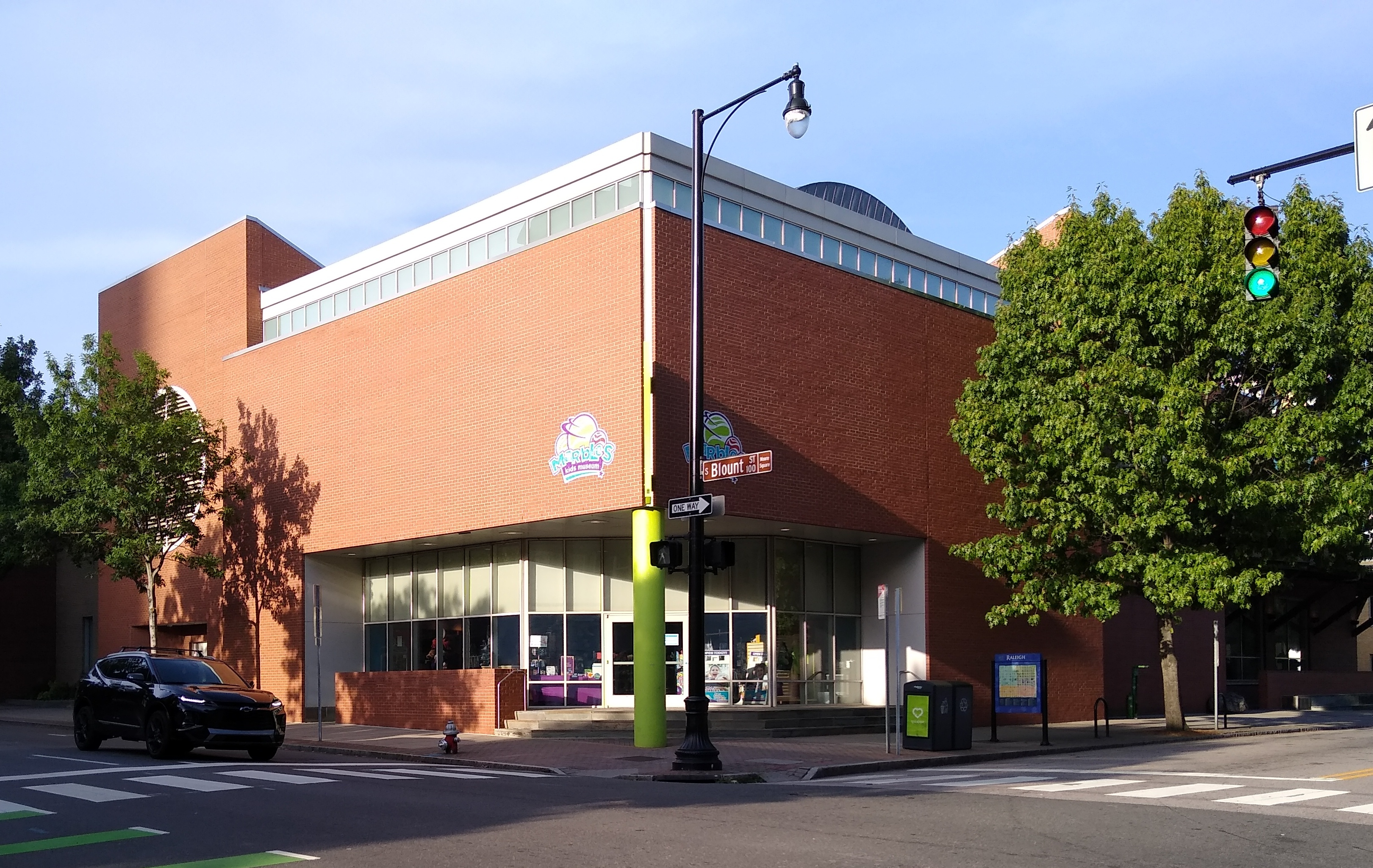
Marbles Kids Museum

Marbles Kids Museum is a nonprofit children's museum located in downtown Raleigh, North Carolina in the Moore Square Historic District.

Marbles was founded in 2007 as a result of the merger between Exploris, an interactive global learning center, and Playspace, a children's museum aimed at preschool through early elementary age children. Marbles mission is to "…spark imagination, discovery and learning through play."

== Exhibits ==
The museum has several permanent, play-based exhibits that align with five core initiatives:

- Ready Set Learn.
- Be Healthy, Be Active.
- Create, Innovate.
- Explore, Experiment.
- Connect.

== IMAX theater ==
Marbles has an IMAX theater on its campus that plays first-run Hollywood features and 45-minute documentary movies. The screen is the largest conventional IMAX in the state, measuring 52 x 70 ft (16.1 x 21.3 m).

== History ==
The museum's predecessor, Exploris, opened in 1999 as a $39.5 million state-of-the-art interactive global learning center. Playspace was an interactive children's museum aimed at preschool through early elementary age children. It was originally located in City Market and would remain there until the late 1990s, when it moved to 410 Glenwood Avenue in a former dairy building. Though some funding was provided by Wake County, the non-profit museum was mostly financed through corporate sponsorship of individual exhibits as well as the $5-per-person admission price (in addition to memberships). In the summer of 2007, the two museums closed. Playspace would then be moved into Exploris' building, and a new name for the combined museums was chosen. The new name, Marbles, was selected to reflect the new museum's unique two-story stainless steel wall grid inset with over 1.2 million marbles. It was revealed to the public that same year on opening day, September 29.

On September 16, 2024, Wake County approved a $6.14 million expansion and renovation, for which the county would contribute $2.7 million. 2,600 square feet each will be added on the first and second floors along with a new stairway and a rooftop courtyard, and the Northwest section will be renovated. The expansion will include an exhibit called "Workforce of the Future". Construction is expected in Fall 2025.
