= Business improvement districts in the United States =

Business improvement districts in the United States (BIDs), also known as local improvement districts (LIDs), are United States special districts within a city that are overseen by a nonprofit entity. In the United States, business improvement districts are typically funded by an additional tax assessment, with the tax increase going toward improvements of the area.

By 2010, BIDs had been used in nearly 1,000 major cities and small towns throughout the United States, including most major U.S. cities that have multiple BIDs. New York City alone has 78 BIDs.

Business improvement districts are private sector initiatives to improve the environment of a business district. Services financed by a BID are intended to enhance existing city services, not replace public works or economic development departments.

== History ==
The International Downtown Association (IDA) 2011 BID census report states that all US states except Wyoming, including the District of Columbia, have at least one BID. The 2011 IDA report states that, at the time, there were 1,002 BIDs in the United States. As of 2010, North Dakota passed senate bill 2356 to appeal section 40-22.1-01 of the North Dakota Century Code to allow special tax assessment districts in the state.

== Operations ==
The districts are areas within a municipality where some form of revenue generation is legally enforced to provide services for area, beyond those offered by the municipal and county services. BID formation varies on a state-by-state level, and are also referred to as neighborhood improvement districts, special improvement districts, or local improvement districts.

Depending on state statute, business improvement districts can be funded a variety of ways, including through a tax assessment or mill levy or Tax Increment Financing on property tax, and then managed by a nonprofit agency. BIDs provide an array of services to keep districts clean and managed to improve mix of activities, transportation, and aesthetics of public places. Business Improvement Districts became widely noted after their success in transforming Times Square and Union Square in New York City from places abandoned and filled with crime into dynamic neighborhoods. They are based on the premise that making attractive commercial districts will attract shoppers and make an environment conducive to thriving businesses.

Often, BIDs are formed as a result of property owners in a defined district who seek funding for a variety of services, including governmental services such as cleaning and maintenance, non-governmental services such as marketing and promotion or beautification, and the implementation of capital investments. Most states rule that a BID must be governed by a board of directors that are composed of a certain percentage of property owners, business owners, and residents that are in the district, as well as public officials.

== Benefits ==
=== Crime reduction ===
Studies have shown a reduction in crime within the district boundaries. One study found that there was a 12% reduction in robbery and an 8% total crime reduction within the boundaries of the BID in Los Angeles. There is no agreed upon standard for accountability for BID management organizations, but they are held accountable due to the limitations of what the budget can be appropriated to, making the abuse of power less likely. The small amount of stakeholders also limits the risk of corruption, with more individuals keeping watch of the activities managed by the BID

=== Increased property values ===
A Study of New York BIDs revealed that commercial properties within the defined areas of a business improvement district sold for 30.7 percent more than comparable properties in the same area but outside of the district boundaries. This study implies that the positive effects are exacerbated in larger BIDs, made of mostly office space, with larger budgets.

== Criticisms ==
=== Accountability ===
Critics of Business Improvement Districts are concerned that there are few restrictions as to what the revenues going toward the BID will fund. With the limited restrictions, property owners within the district may be required to fund services that they do not particularly want or need. In many places, BIDs are independent organizations and are not required to report extensively to their local government and stakeholders. This lack of accountability can be concerning to residents and property owners paying the additional tax.

=== Crime spillover ===
Critics are also concerned about the spillover of crime that may be diverted, and then concentrated outside of the BID districts, particularly in larger cities with BIDs that focus on security and crime prevention.

=== One Person One Vote ===
In Kessler Vs. Grand Central District Management Association, residents within the Manhattan BID argued that the election of board members were not completed fairly in accordance with the one person one vote principle. The ruling opposed the resident's claim, stating that a BID can have different voting classes because the results are disproportionate among property owners.

=== Private control of public space ===
Property owners and people within the district who oppose a BID may see it as an attempt to delegate control of public space to the private sector. Without government accountability (elections), it is difficult for the public to make a change in the actions that the BID managing organization controls.

== Other Improvement Districts or authorities ==
- Tourism Improvement Districts California, Montana and Washington have laws that enable tourism improvement districts, and other states are in the process of developing legislation, including Florida and South Carolina.
- Urban Renewal Authority
- Downtown Development Authority
- Special Districts
- General Improvement Districts

== By state ==
=== North Carolina ===
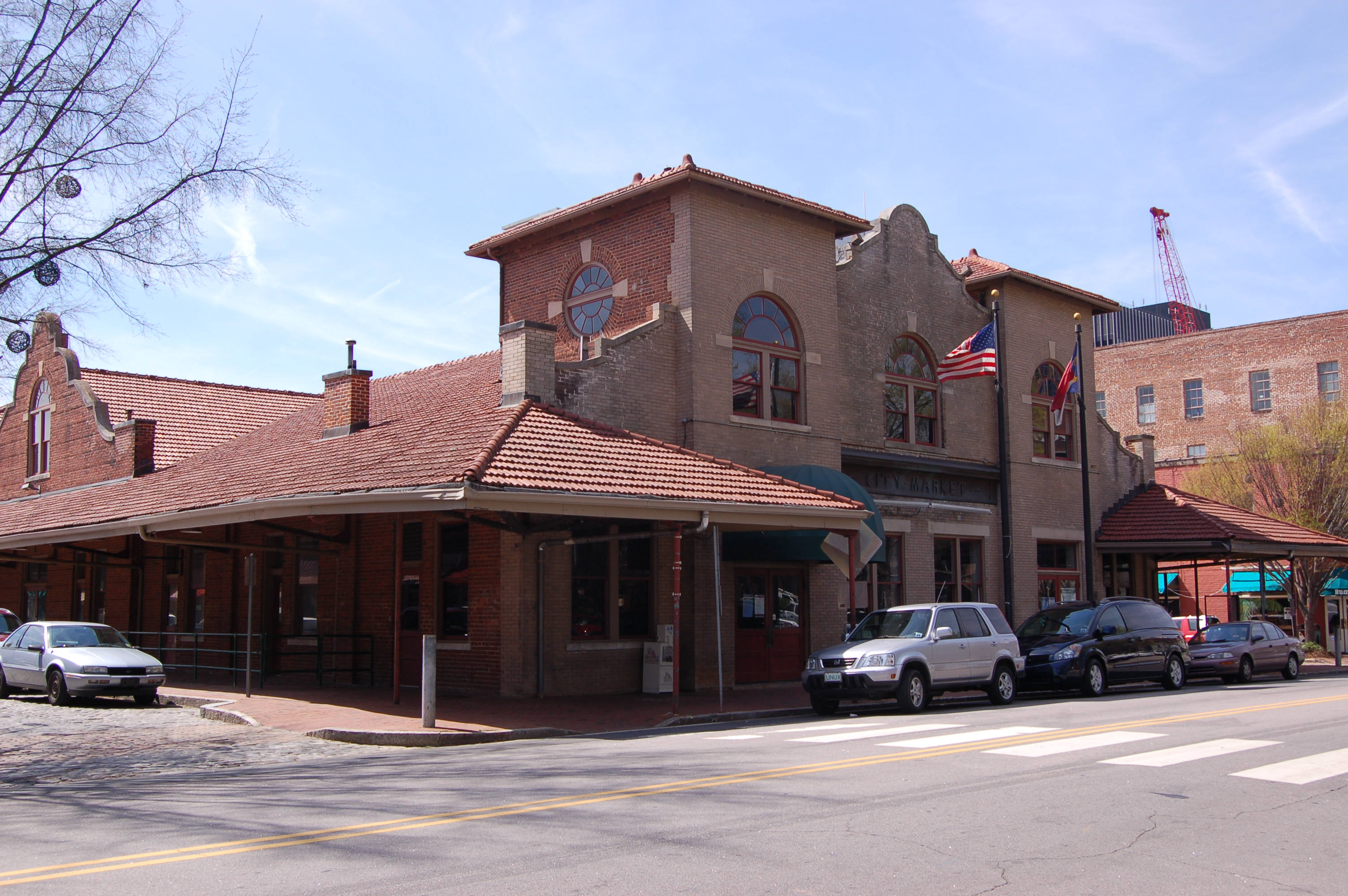
City Market in Raleigh, North Carolina

North Carolina State Statute names Business Improvement Districts, or other taxing districts Municipal Services Districts (MSD). Municipal Services Districts or BIDs in North Carolina can only be funded by an ad valorem tax, meaning the city can levy an additional tax on all property within the designated district. The process for which MSDs, or Business Improvement Districts, are formed, begins with defining the service area. The report must first express the need for why the proposed area requires the benefits of a special district, as opposed to the remainder of the city. A report must be prepared with a map of district boundaries, statement of purpose for the district, and a plan for how the district is formed. The report is then open for public hearing, prior to adopting the plan.

==== Types of Municipal Service Districts in North Carolina ====
- Beach erosion control and flood and hurricane protection works
- Downtown revitalization projects
- Urban area revitalization projects
- Transit-oriented development projects
- Drainage projects
- Sewage collection and disposal systems of all types
- Lighting at interstate highway interchange ramps
- Off-street parking facilities
- Watershed improvement projects

Downtown Revitalization is defined in terms of the North Carolina State Statute as projects that include, but are not limited to improvements in water, gas, storm, and sanitary sewer mains, power lines, improved lighting, streets and sidewalks (including easements and right of way), construction of walkways, pedestrian-friendly areas or malls, bike paths, parking facilities and traffic congestion relief. Intangible improvements include reduction of crime, public health, safety and welfare improvements, promoting the economic vitality of the district. Downtown revitalization can also include sponsoring of events, marketing or promotions to promote the district internally and externally.

=== California ===
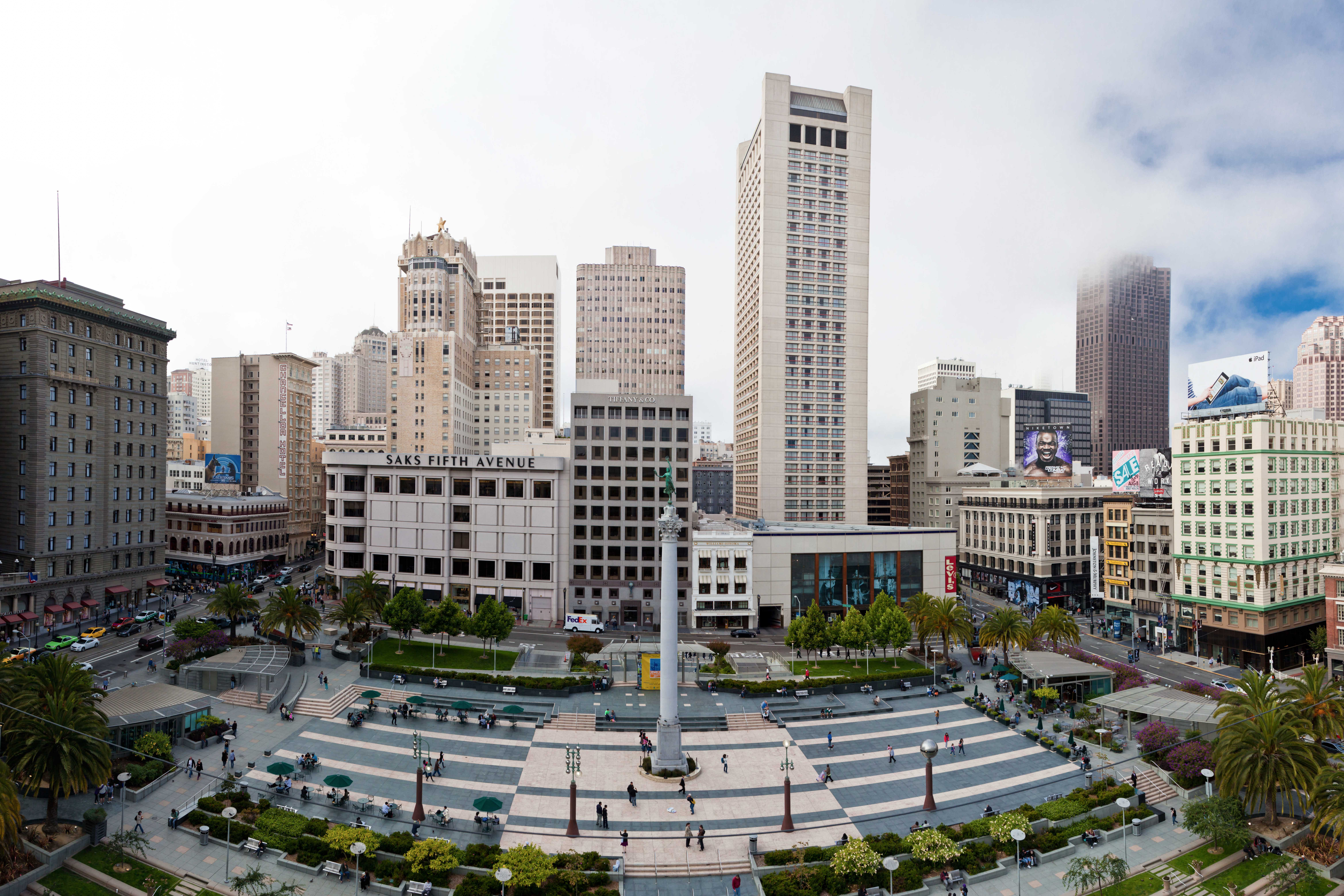
Union Square in San Francisco, California

In California, there are 3 primary types of BIDs all of which have their own standards for assessments and require different legal actions. In California, the payments made by the businesses and property owners within the districts are technically "fees" and not "taxes." Due to Proposition 13, adopted by the voters in 1978, California State statute no longer allows for ad valorem assessment (i.e., based on property value). As a result of Proposition 218 (1996), BIDs may no longer assess their participating businesses and property owners for general governmental services, but are limited to assessing fees for provision of special benefits to the affected properties over and above those conferred to the public at large, and the properties may only be assessed an amount proportional to the special benefit it receives.

- Property-based BIDs (PBID) assess real property.
- Business-based BIDs (BBID) assess business owners.
- Tourism-based BIDs assess hospitality and tourism.

==== Legislation in California ====
- The Parking and Business Improvement Area Law of 1965 was California's first effort. This version of the enabling legislation allowed ad valorem taxation of the businesses within the district. Following adoption of Proposition 13, other methods of allocating the assessment among participating businesses were required.
- Parking and Business Improvement Area Law of 1989 followed the 1965 statute, and is the first known tourism improvement district enabling law. This act allows for a municipality to initiate the process to form the district, and requires the municipality to have a public hearing to form the district. It must also be renewed every year and overseen by an advisory board.
- Property and Business Improvement District Law of 1994 gives greater flexibility to the lodging business owners. This law allows for Tourism Improvement Districts to form in an initial term of 5 years with possibility of a 10-year renewal. To form the district, businesses that will pay 50% of the assessment are required to submit a petition, and three council hearings with option for public protest are required. The law also allows for a nonprofit organization to manage funds in cooperation with the municipality.

==== San Francisco ====
In San Francisco, BIDs are known as Community Benefit Districts (CBDs) and are based upon 2005 city legislation that builds upon California's 1994 BID law. The 2004 law increases the initial term from 5 to 15 years and lowers the petition threshold necessary to initiate the legislative process.

=== Colorado ===
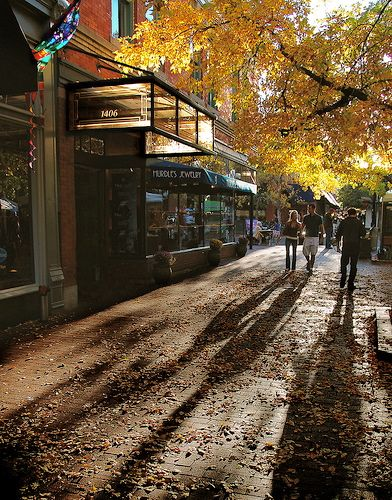
Pearl Street Mall in Boulder, Colorado

Colorado’s Business Improvement District Law of 1988 includes key provisions that allow BIDs to provide a wide variety of services, including public safety, planning, events, and parking management, those services are provided by private sector organizations. The law holds BIDs accountable to all payees into the district through a board of directors that is composed of business and property owners located within the district. All property owners, lessees and residents within the district are given the opportunity to vote for the tax in their district.

=== Michigan ===
By result of Public Act 120 of 1961, cities and townships in Michigan can establish a BID within a defined area. The municipality is allowed to fund the district by tax assessments and bonds to cover additional maintenance, security, and management of the district. Chapter 2 of the Act allows private property owners within a Business Improvement Zone (BIZ) to levy special assessments to finance programs that are established in a zone plan, over a period of seven years.

=== New York ===
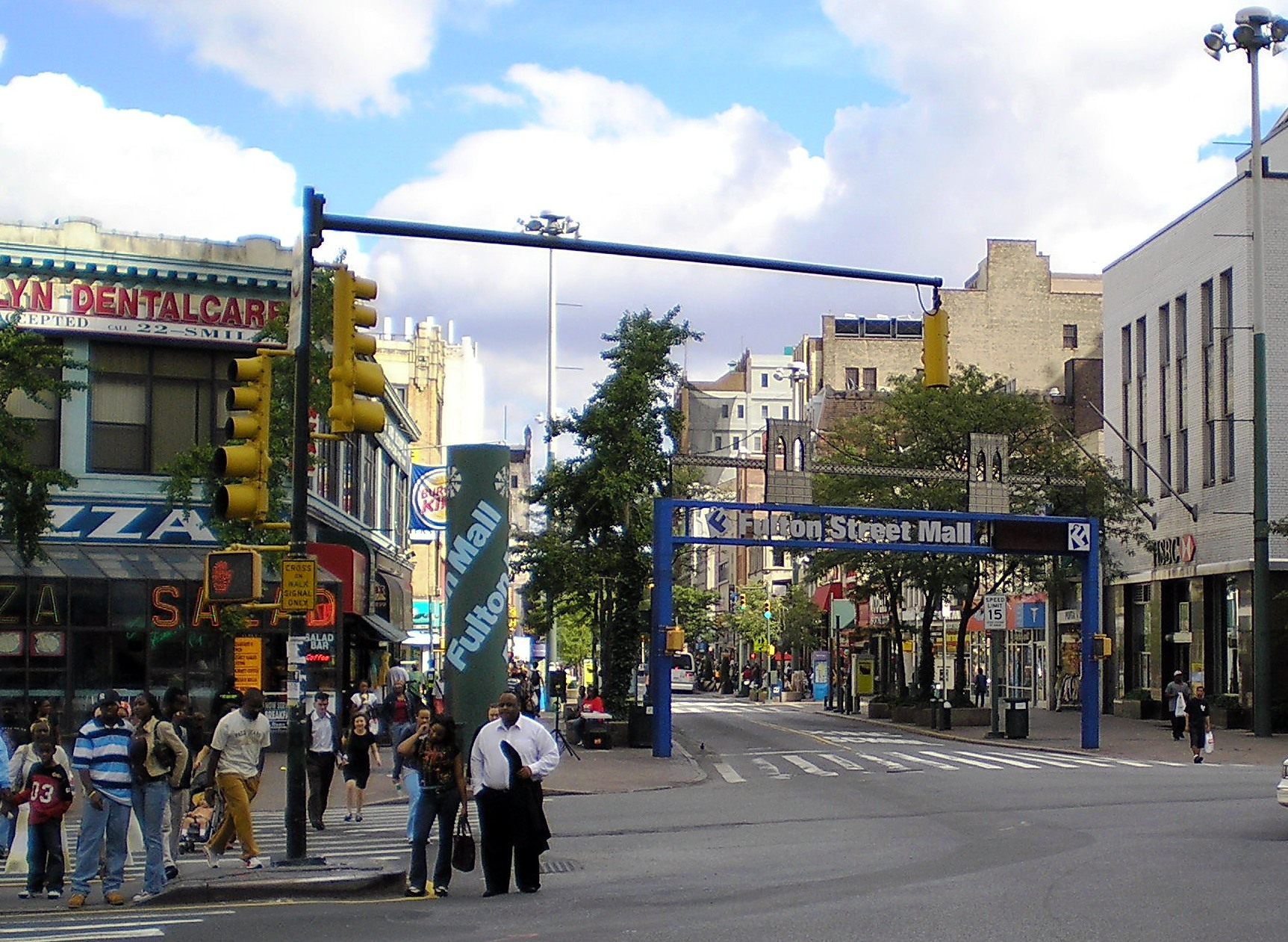
Fulton Street Mall in Brooklyn, New York

New York City has the largest network of Business Improvement Districts in the United States, with 78 BIDs within the city. New York City's BIDs invest over $207 million in programs and services in their respective districts. New York's BID movement began in the 1960s when business owners and residents realized public resources were limited to improve commercial areas. In 1976, the first Special Assessment District legislation was passed, noting that the city would make capital improvements for an area under the condition that property owners would maintain them, the first Special Assessment District was Fulton Mall in Brooklyn. In 1981-1982, legislation was passed for property owners to levy taxes in self-funding Business Improvement Districts.

=== Oregon ===
In Portland, Oregon, local improvement districts are typically used to pave streets.

=== Washington ===
Local improvement districts are codified in the Revised Code of Washington; the term "local improvement district" appeared in 1981 legislation. In Seattle, Washington, LIDs authorized by state law have been applied for a variety of large projects. The South Lake Union Streetcar was funded through $25 million in LID funds derived from a local property tax. The redevelopment of the city's waterfront is expected to be funded using a $200 million property tax through a LID created in 2018.

=== Wisconsin ===
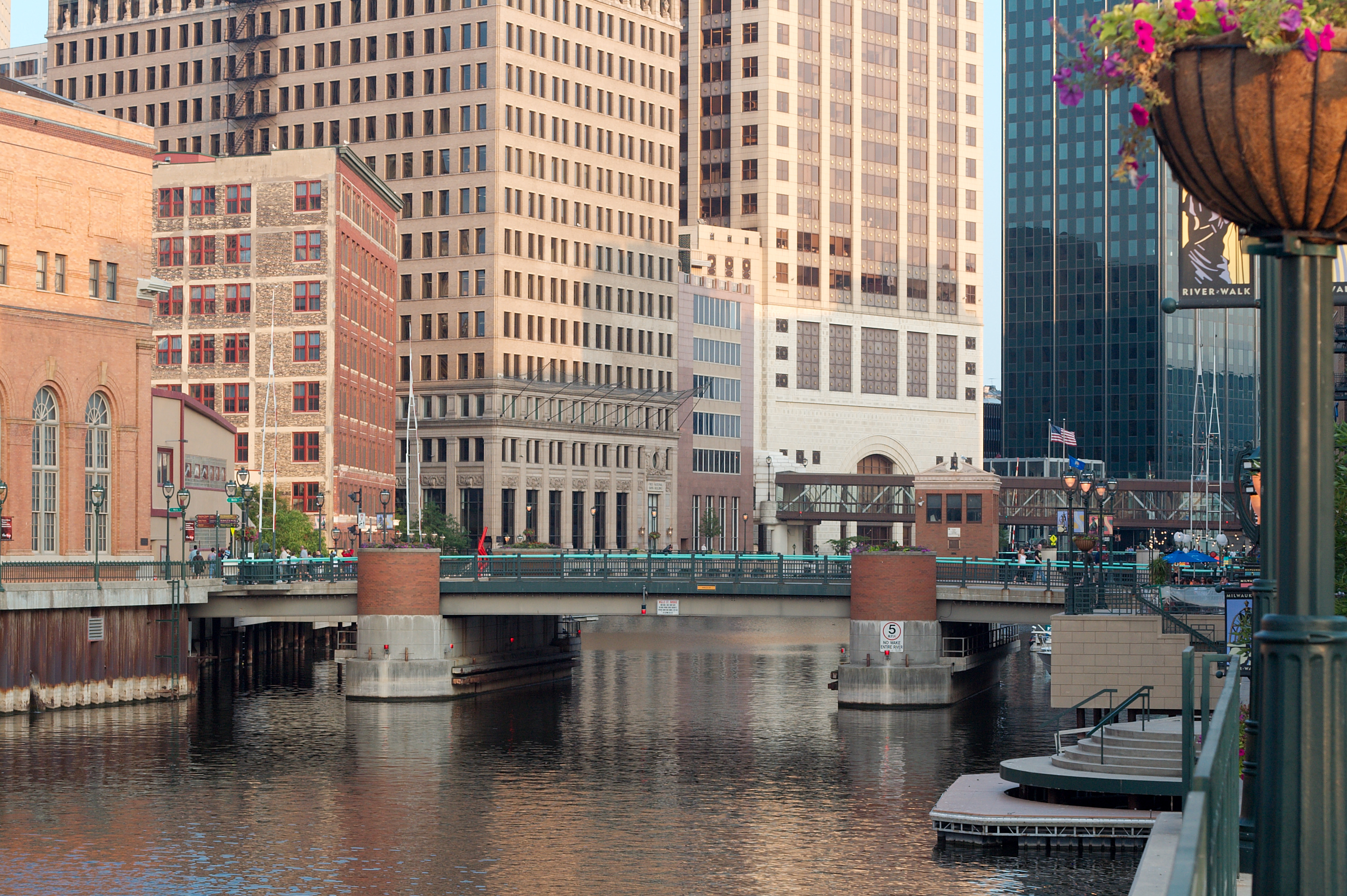
Downtown Milwaukee, Wisconsin

The following steps are required to establish a BID in Wisconsin:

1. Form a BID committee that adequately represents all stakeholders within the district
2. BID Committee must draft initial plan that identifies the goals and objectives, highlights its relationship with a comprehensive or master plan, and how the assessment will be calculated and collected.
3. The committee petitions the local government for permission to establish the district
4. Local government creates notice of proposal and hosts a public hearing
5. Public hearing is held with proposed plan. The plan may be rejected if a petition is signed by over 40% of property owners within the district
6. Council votes to adopt or reject the plan to establish a BID
7. Mayor or city's CEO appoints BID board members, 5 of which have to be property owners within the district.

=== Other States' BID laws and precedents ===
- Georgia: The board of directors of BIDs are all elected, but local governments collect the assessment.
- New Jersey: The managing organization is typically a nonprofit and boards are not elected. The local government can then levy the tax assessment.
- Pennsylvania: Public authorities are formed, and board of directors are appointed by local government.
