= 1996 Raleigh murders =

Serial murders in Raleigh, North Carolina

- Victims, left to right: Patricia Ashe, Dewanna Burt, Patricia Woods, Dawn Grandy, Cynthia Brown, and Deborah Elliot
- Location: Raleigh, Wake County, North Carolina
- Date: January 7 – December 23, 1996
- Target: Prostitutes
- Attack type: Serial killings
- Deaths: 6
- Perpetrators: Multiple (Note: Out of all six murders, three have been conclusively solved and linked to two separate offenders); Confirmed perpetrators Leman Evans; John Williams Jr.
- Convictions: Williams; First degree murder (2 counts); Evans; Voluntary manslaughter
- Sentence: Williams; Death; Evans; 23-27 months imprisonment

The 1996 Raleigh murders were a series of six murders and several rapes targeted towards female residents of Raleigh, North Carolina, from January to December 1996. At the time, the investigating authorities believed the killings to be the work of a serial killer, and the cases were investigated under that belief.

In 1997, a homeless man named John Williams Jr. was arrested for attempted murder and became the prime suspect in the case. He was later indicted for two of the murders (Patricia Ashe and Deborah Elliot) and was convicted the following year, receiving the death penalty. As other evidence emerged, it was revealed that multiple people perpetrated the murders as Leman Evans was convicted for the sole murder of Dewanna Burt. The other three murders of Dawn Grandy, Cynthia Brown and Patricia Woods are still unsolved.

== Murders ==
On January 7, 1996, the nude body of 33-year-old Patricia Ashe, a crack cocaine user and suspected prostitute, was discovered laying on a bench by local Raleigh resident Rodney Bass. Under her body was a pair of jeans and a long sleeve t-shirt. An autopsy was conducted on Ashe's body, which concluded she had been strangled to death. Scratches and scrapes were also located on her body, indicating she had put up a fight with her killer.

Days later, on January 17, the body of 36-year-old Dewanna Burt was found in a parking lot on Poole Road, with a single gunshot wound to the back of the head. On June 13, the body of 38-year-old Patricia Gwendolyn Woods was discovered inside Oakwood Cemetery, which was across the street from where she lived.

On July 13, a transient found the body of 30-year-old Dawn Marie Grandy in a homeless camp under Morgan Street bridge. In August, an unidentified woman was found dead, and it was not until January 9 the following year that she was identified as 32-year-old Cynthia Louise Brown. The murders went quiet for a while, but started up again in December 1996.

On December 23, 1996, Deborah Jean Elliot spoke with her sisters about Christmas plans. Afterward, Elliot left her home late at night to meet with one of her sisters. She never showed up, and in the days after, Elliot was not seen. On December 26, Elliot's body was found completely nude except for her socks and shoes. Family members could not think of anyone wanting to hurt Elliot, and they described her as a dedicated mother of three. At the same time, it was suspected she had worked as a prostitute.

== Investigation ==
In the days after Elliot's murder, Raleigh police investigated the six killings under speculation of a possible serial killer active in the city. Police began speculating on a serial killer after similarities in each case were noticed, as all the victims were African-American women who were somewhat involved in prostitution. With the help of the Federal Bureau of Investigation (FBI), they created a psychological profile of the killer. The city's police assigned 54 detectives to investigate the case, and authorities rewarded $6,000 for information leading to an arrest.

Now fearing a serial killer was on the loose, investigators investigated numerous suspects, reportedly conducting over 6,000 interviews and increased surveillance. During the investigation, the killer was linked to numerous rapes committed around the city since October 1995.

== Suspects ==
=== Leman Evans ===
In January 1997, police arrested 60-year-old Leman Evans in connection with the January 17, 1996, murder of Dewanna Burt. Evans was originally investigated as a suspect in Burt's death, and her family was acquainted with Evans. Evans confessed to killing Burt, thus solving one of the six cases. In August 1997 Evans pleaded guilty to voluntary manslaughter and received 23 to 27 months in prison.

=== John Williams Jr. ===
John Williams Jr.
- Born: February 20, 1961 (age 65); Augusta, Georgia, U.S.
- Status: Incarcerated
- Convictions: First degree murder (2 counts); Attempted rape Aggravated assault
- Penalty: Death

Details
- Victims: 2+
- Country: United States
- State: North Carolina
- Imprisoned at: Central Prison

On February 4, 1997, a woman named Shelly Jackson was drinking and doing drugs outside a store near Moore Square. Around this time, a black man approached and started a conversation with Jackson, inviting her to do cocaine with him in a secluded area. Jackson agreed and followed the man to a fenced-in lot that was filled with abandoned vehicles, but once inside an abandoned truck, the man attacked Jackson, grabbing her neck and pulling out a weapon which according to Jackson looked like a razor blade.

According to Jackson, the man exclaimed, "Shut up... I got you now. I'm going to kill you." He demanded that she remove her clothes, which she refused to do and then attempted to fight him off. At the same time, Raleigh Police Sgt. T.C. Earnhart was driving past the area. Jackson noticed his police car and broke free of her attacker, running towards the police vehicle while screaming for help. When Jackson reached Earnheart, she was frantically telling him that a man was trying to kill her. Earnhart had noticed the man, who by then had fled, and Earnhart immediately radioed for backup.

Within minutes, police, who were now scouting out the area, found a man wandering around with blood on his shirt and promptly arrested him. The man was taken to the police station, where Jackson identified him as the man who attacked her. The man was identified as 35-year-old John Williams Jr., a native of Augusta, Georgia. At the time of the attack, he was homeless and was, at the time, drifting across North Carolina, primarily in the Raleigh area. He had prior 1977 convictions for attempted rape and aggravated assault in his home state. Investigators noticed similarities in the attack to the murders in the area at the time.

While Williams was in jail awaiting trial for the attempted murder charge, on March 19, he was additionally charged with first-degree murder for the killing of Patricia Ashe. Authorities also charged him with another murder, that of Debra Elliot. DNA evidence that was taken from Williams matched forensic evidence that was left at Elliot's scene, and it also matched evidence found at four rape scenes.

== Trial ==
The trial for John Williams opened in late January 1998. Prosecutors sought the death penalty. Williams' defense brought in two mental health specialists to prove that Williams was not in the right state of mind during the murders. They brought up Williams' childhood, during which he endured a lot of abuse by his stepfather. He had also watched his sister being sexually assaulted, which according to one of the psychiatrists, made Williams feel powerless.

They also contested that Williams' IQ was measured at 80, which was considerably low on the intelligence scale. His defense also doubted the evidence that was used to arrest Williams, telling the jury the not to blindly rely on the DNA evidence. They brought up the victim's history of exchanging money for sex and pointed out that the DNA evidence only proved that Williams had sex with the victims at one point.

At the end of the trial, Williams was found guilty by the seven men and five women jury. He was sentenced to death for both murders and was additionally convicted in the rape of two other women but was acquitted in one attempted rape case. An attempt to resentence Williams to life in 2002 was denied by the North Carolina Supreme Court. As of 2023, Williams remains on North Carolina's death row awaiting execution.

== See also ==
- List of death row inmates in the United States § North Carolina
- List of serial killers in the United States
- List of serial rapists
- List of unsolved murders (1980–1999)
