= Rider Broncs basketball =

Rider Broncs basketball may refer to either of the basketball teams that represent Rider University:

- Rider Broncs men's basketball
- Rider Broncs women's basketball
