= Bass Lake Dam =

- Location within North Carolina
- Interactive map of Bass Lake Dam
- Location: Holly Springs, Wake County, North Carolina
- Coordinates: 35°38′31″N 78°48′12″W
- Construction began: 2003
- Owner: Holly Springs, North Carolina

Dam and spillways
- Type of dam: Earth
- Length: 825 ft (251 m)
- Width (base): 30 ft (9.1 m) - 145 ft (44 m)
- Spillway type: Chute (Open Channel) Spillway, 50ft wide

Reservoir
- Creates: Bass Lake (Holly Springs, North Carolina)
- Total capacity: 0 acre⋅ft (0 m^{3})
- Catchment area: 0 sq mi (0 km^{2})
- Surface area: 0 acres (0 km^{2})

Base Lake Dam is an embankment dam in Holly Springs, North Carolina which creates Bass Lake.

== See also ==
- Sunset Lake (Holly Springs, North Carolina)
- Sunset Lake Dam (Holly Springs, North Carolina)
- Wake County, North Carolina
- Holly Springs, North Carolina
