= Alford House (disambiguation) =

Alford House is a youth club in Aveline Road, Oval, London, England that was subject of the 1959 documentary "We Are the Lambeth Boys".

It may also refer to:

In England

- Alford Manor House, a Grade II* listed building in Alford, Lincolnshire

In the United States

- Alford-Nielson House, Ferndale, Humboldt County, California
- Leslie-Alford-Mims House, Holly Springs, Wake County, North Carolina

== See also ==
- Alford Building, in the Sylvester Commercial Historic District, Sylvester, Georgia, U.S.
