= Stella Johnson (basketball) =

American basketball player (born 1998)

Personal information
- Born: July 11, 1998 (age 28) Denville Township, New Jersey
- Listed height: 5 ft 10 in (1.78 m)
- Listed weight: 158 lb (72 kg)

Career information
- High school: Morris Catholic (Denville, New Jersey)
- College: Rider (2016–2020)
- WNBA draft: 2020: 3rd round, 29th overall pick
- Drafted by: Phoenix Mercury
- Playing career: 2020–present
- Position: Point guard

Career history
- 2020: Chicago Sky
- 2020–2021: Washington Mystics

Career highlights
- 2× MAAC Player of the Year (2019, 2020); 2× First-team All-MAAC (2019, 2020); Second-team All-MAAC (2018); MAAC All-Rookie Team (2017); NCAA season scoring leader (2020)
- Stats at Basketball Reference

Stella Johnson (born July 11, 1998) is an American professional basketball player who most recently played for the Washington Mystics of the Women's National Basketball Association (WNBA). She played college basketball for the Rider Broncs.

== Career ==
Despite playing on a top-tier Amateur Athletic Union team, Johnson was unranked and not recruited by major college teams. She was recruited by and enrolled in Rider University of the Metro Atlantic Athletic Conference (MAAC), whose women's basketball team had never made the NCAA tournament. In her four seasons with the Rider Broncs, she was named MAAC Player of the Year two times and led the team to its first postseason appearance in the 2017 Women's National Invitation Tournament. At the end of the 2019–20 season, she was the only active Division I player to record 2,000 points, 700 rebounds, 400 assists and 300 steals.

She was drafted in the 3rd round of the 2020 WNBA draft by the Phoenix Mercury, with the 29th overall pick. She was waived by the Mercury before the start of the season, but was signed by the Chicago Sky on June 29, 2020. On July 28, she made her WNBA debut in a win over the Los Angeles Sparks. On August 12, she was waived by the Sky. On August 13, the Washington Mystics signed Johnson after they were issued an emergency hardship waiver.

== Career statistics ==
Legend
GP	Games played	GS	Games started	MPG	Minutes per game	RPG	Rebounds per game
APG	Assists per game	SPG	Steals per game	BPG	Blocks per game	PPG	Points per game
TO	Turnovers per game	FG%	Field-goal percentage	3P%	3-point field-goal percentage	FT%	Free-throw percentage
**Bold**	Career best	°	League leader

=== WNBA ===
==== Regular season ====
Year	Team	GP	GS	MPG	FG%	3P%	FT%	RPG	APG	SPG	BPG	TO	PPG
2020	Chicago	4	0	1.5	.000	.000	.000	0.5	0.0	0.3	0.0	0.0	0.0
2020	Washington	5	**2**	**18.8**	**.485**	**.643**	**1.000**	**2.0**	**2.4**	**1.0**	**0.4**	0.8	**9.2**
2021	Washington	**6**	0	5.2	.375	.400	**1.000**	0.5	0.3	0.0	0.2	0.8	2.0
Career	2 years, 2 teams	15	2	8.7	.452	.579	1.000	1.0	0.9	0.4	0.2	0.6	3.9

=== College ===
Legend
GP	Games played	GS	Games started	MPG	Minutes per game	FG%	Field goal percentage	3P%	3-point field goal percentage
FT%	Free throw percentage	RPG	Rebounds per game	APG	Assists per game	SPG	Steals per game	BPG	Blocks per game
TO	Turnovers per game	PPG	Points per game	**Bold**	Career high	*	Led Division I

Year	Team	GP	GS	MPG	FG%	3P%	FT%	RPG	APG	SPG	BPG	TO	PPG
2016–17	Rider	**33**	**32**	26.7	**50.6**	30.4	76.9	4.5	2.2	2.8	0.6	**2.7**	9.9
2017–18	Rider	31	31	33.6	45.3	**40.0**	72.7	6.2	3.2	2.5	**0.9**	3.0	16.0
2018–19	Rider	32	**32**	33.2	45.1	37.7	71.9	5.7	**4.4**	2.5	0.8	3.4	18.8
2019–20	Rider	30	30	**37.1**	47.0	32.9	**80.4**	**7.6**	3.8	**2.9**	0.8	4.6	***24.8**
**Career**		126	125	32.5	46.6	36.0	76.1	6.0	3.4	2.7	0.8	3.4	17.2
Statistics retrieved from Sports-Reference.
