= Bass Lake (Holly Springs, North Carolina) =

- Location within North Carolina Location within the United States
- Location: Wake County, North Carolina, U.S.
- Coordinates: 35°38′31″N 78°48′12″W
- Type: Lake
- Basin countries: United States
- Surface area: 50 acres (20 ha)

Bass Lake is an artificial lake in Holly Springs, North Carolina. The lake is owned by the Town of Holly Springs.

Bass Lake was purchased in the 1950s by James Harry Cornell, who hosted a fishing club at the private lake. The lake was originally known as Mills Pond. In 1996, Hurricane Fran destroyed Bass Lake Dam and consequently drained the lake; two years later, the Town of Holly Springs purchased the lake site for $230,000. The town rebuilt the dam and restored the lake as a public lake, which opened in 2004.

The North Carolina Wildlife Resources Commission stocks the lake with catfish. Populations of largemouth bass, brim, and crappie can also be found. The land around the lake is now a public park, featuring a two-mile (3.2 km) walking trail, nature center, and boat rentals.

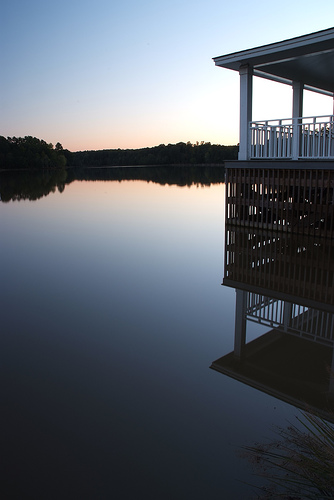
The Bass Lake deck at sunset

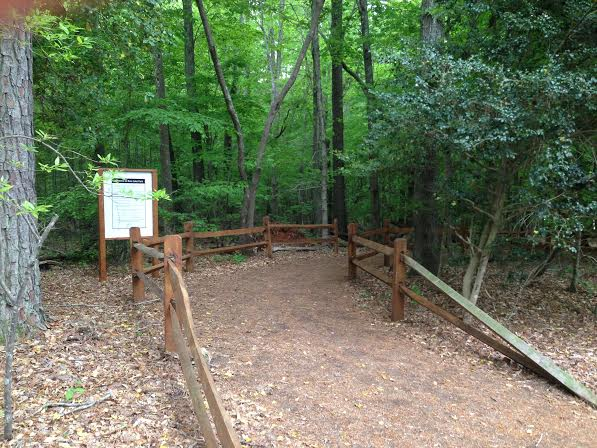
Southernmost walking trail

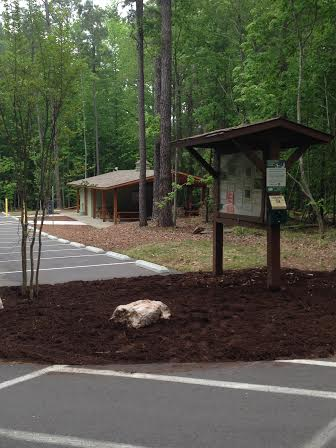
Picnic shelter

== See also ==
- Bass Lake Dam (Holly Springs, North Carolina)
- Sunset Lake (Holly Springs, North Carolina)
- Wake County, North Carolina
- Holly Springs, North Carolina
