= 2021 Washington Mystics season =

- Head coach: Mike Thibault
- Arena: Entertainment and Sports Arena

Results
- Record: 12–20 (.375)
- Place: 4th (Eastern)
- Playoff finish: Did not qualify

The 2021 Washington Mystics season was the franchise's 24th season in the Women's National Basketball Association (WNBA). The regular season tipped off versus the Chicago Sky on May 15, 2021.

The Mystics struggled to start the season only winning two of their six games in the month of May. Their fortunes rebounded when they posted a .500 winning percentage through June and in their two games in July before the Olympic break. In closing out their pre-Olympic schedule they won in overtime versus the Chicago Sky to finish the first portion of the schedule with an 8–10 record. Coming back from the break, they faced a tough schedule and posted a 2–6 record, including losing the first four games back from the break. To close out the season, September contained two wins book marked by two losses on either side. Going into the last day of the season, the Mystics had a chance to secure a playoff spot, but lost to the Minnesota Lynx to miss the playoffs and finish with a 12–20 record. Tina Charles was a bright spot during the season, as she led the league in scoring.

== Transactions ==
=== WNBA draft ===
Due to a trade in 2020 for C Tina Charles, the Mystics did not make a selection in the 2021 Draft.

=== Trades and roster changes ===
Date	Details
December 28, 2020	Exercised Team Option on G Kiara Leslie
January 4, 2021	Extended Qualifying Offers to G Stella Johnson, G Jacki Gemelos, and G Sug Sutton
January 8, 2021	Re-Signed G Stella Johnson, G Jacki Gemelos, and G Sug Sutton
February 1, 2021	Signed F Alysha Clark
February 2, 2021	Re-Signed F LaToya Sanders
February 5, 2021	Re-Signed C Tina Charles
February 5, 2021	Acquired F Erica McCall from the Minnesota Lynx in exchange for the Mystic's third round pick in the 2022 WNBA draft.
February 26, 2021	Signed G Ariel Atkins to a Contract Extension
March 8, 2021	F LaToya Sanders retires.
March 8, 2021	Signed F Theresa Plaisance
March 10, 2021	Re-Signed G Natasha Cloud
March 16, 2021	Signed F Aislinn Konig to a Training Camp Contract
March 19, 2021	G Jacki Gemelos retires
March 31, 2021	Signed G Shavonte Zellous
April 16, 2021	Signed F G'mrice Davis to a Training Camp Contract
April 18, 2021	Signed F Tyra Whitehead, F Blanca Millán, and G Pre Stanley to Training Camp Contracts
April 20, 2021	Full Season Suspend F Alysha Clark due to Overseas Injury
April 30, 2021	Signed G Klara Lundquist to a Training Camp Contract
May 2, 2021	Waived F Tyra Whitehead
May 5, 2021	Full Season Suspend G Klara Lundquist
May 5, 2021	Waived F Blanca Millan
May 10, 2021	Waived G Pre Stanley and G Aislinn Konig
May 11, 2021	Waived F G'mrice Davis
May 12, 2021	Temporarily Suspend F Myisha Hines-Allen due to Overseas Commitment
May 13, 2021	Waived G Sug Sutton
May 13, 2021	Traded a 2022 2nd Round Pick to Los Angeles in exchange for G Sydney Wiese
May 22, 2021	Activate F Myisha Hines-Allen from Temporary Suspension List
May 22, 2021	Waived F Jillian Alleyne
June 21, 2021	Signed F Megan Gustafson to a Hardship Contract
June 28, 2021	Waived F Megan Gustafson, G Stella Johnson, and G Kiara Leslie
July 1, 2021	Signed F Megan Gustafson and G Shatori Walker-Kimbrough to 7-Day Contracts
July 8, 2021	Signed F Megan Gustafson and G Shatori Walker-Kimbrough to a 2nd 7-Day Contracts
August 18, 2021	Signed G Shatori Walker-Kimbrough to a Rest-Of-Season Contract
August 18, 2021	Signed F Megan Gustafson to a 3rd 7-Day Contract
August 25, 2021	Signed F Megan Gustafson to a Rest-Of-Season Contract

== Roster ==
2021 Washington Mystics roster
Players
Coaches

Pos.	No.	Nat.	Name	Height	Weight	DOB	From	Yrs
G	7	(United States)	Atkins, Ariel	5' 8" (1.73m)	167 lb (76kg)	1996-07-30	Texas	3
C	31	(United States)	Charles, Tina	6' 4" (1.93m)	192 lb (87kg)	1988-12-05	Connecticut	10
G	9	(United States)	Cloud, Natasha	5' 9" (1.75m)	160 lb (73kg)	1992-02-22	Saint Joseph's	5
G/F	11	(United States)	Delle Donne, Elena	6' 5" (1.96m)	187 lb (85kg)	1989-09-05	Delaware	7
F	10	(United States)	Gustafson, Megan	6' 3" (1.91m)	195 lb (88kg)	1996-12-13	Iowa	2
F	2	(United States)	Hines-Allen, Myisha	6' 2" (1.88m)	200 lb (91kg)	1996-05-30	Louisville	3
F	24	(United States)	McCall, Erica	6' 2" (1.88m)	184 lb (83kg)	1995-08-21	Stanford	4
G	5	(Australia)	Mitchell, Leilani	5' 5" (1.65m)	138 lb (63kg)	1985-06-15	Utah	12
C	55	(United States)	Plaisance, Theresa	6' 5" (1.96m)	200 lb (91kg)	1992-05-18	LSU	7
G	2	(United States)	Walker-Kimbrough, Shatori	5' 9" (1.75m)	140 lb (64kg)	1995-05-18	Maryland	4
G	24	(United States)	Wiese, Sydney	6' 0" (1.83m)	165 lb (75kg)	1995-06-16	Oregon State	4
G	21	(United States)	Zellous, Shavonte	5' 10" (1.78m)	188 lb (85kg)	1986-08-28	Pittsburgh	11

Head coach
(United States) Mike Thibault (Saint Martin's)
Assistant coaches
(United States) Eric Thibault (Missouri)
(United States) LaToya Sanders (North Carolina)
Athletic trainer
(United States) Chalisa Fonza (Western Illinois)

Legend

- (C) Team captain
- (DP) Unsigned draft pick
- (FA) Free agent
- (S) Suspended
- Injured

== Game log ==
=== Preseason ===
2021 pre-season game log
May: 0–2 (Home: 0–1; Road: 0–1)

Game	Date	Team	Score	High points	High rebounds	High assists	Location Attendance	Record
1	May 5	Atlanta	L 80–87	Tina Charles (18)	Jillian Alleyne (12)	Natasha Cloud (3)	Entertainment and Sports Arena; 0	0–1
2	May 8	@ Minnesota	L 68–79	Tina Charles (18)	Jillian Alleyne (8)	Natasha Cloud (4)	Target Center; No Fans	0–2

2021 pre-season schedule

=== Regular season ===
2021 game log
Total: 12–20 (Home: 8–8; Road: 4–12)
May: 2–4 (Home: 1–2; Road: 1–2)

Game	Date	Team	Score	High points	High rebounds	High assists	Location Attendance	Record
1	May 15	Chicago	L 56–70	Tina Charles (14)	Erica McCall (9)	Cloud; Mitchell (3)	Entertainment and Sports Arena; 1,050	0–1
2	May 18	Phoenix	L 70–91	Tina Charles (22)	Tina Charles (12)	Leilani Mitchell (7)	Entertainment and Sports Arena; 1,050	0–2
3	May 21	New York	W 101–72	Tina Charles (34)	Tina Charles (13)	Natasha Cloud (8)	Entertainment and Sports Arena; No Fans	1–2
4	May 23	@ Indiana	L 77–89	Tina Charles (31)	Charles; McCall (9)	Ariel Atkins (4)	Bankers Life Fieldhouse; No Fans	1–3
5	May 25	@ Indiana	W 85–69	Tina Charles (30)	Myisha Hines-Allen (10)	Natasha Cloud (7)	Bankers Life Fieldhouse; No Fans	2–3
6	May 28	@ Connecticut	L 81–86	Tina Charles (29)	Myisha Hines-Allen (10)	Charles; Cloud; Hines-Allen (3)	Mohegan Sun Arena; 2,102	2–4

June : 5–5 (Home: 4–2; Road: 1–3)

Game	Date	Team	Score	High points	High rebounds	High assists	Location Attendance	Record
7	June 5	Las Vegas	L 93–96	Myisha Hines-Allen (32)	Myisha Hines-Allen (13)	Natasha Cloud (11)	Entertainment and Sports Arena; 2,100	2–5
8	June 8	Minnesota	W 85–81	Tina Charles (31)	Tina Charles (8)	Natasha Cloud (8)	Entertainment and Sports Arena; 2,100	3–5
9	June 10	Los Angeles	W 89–71	Ariel Atkins (23)	Tina Charles (10)	Natasha Cloud (5)	Entertainment and Sports Arena; 2,100	4–5
10	June 13	@ Atlanta	L 78–101	Myisha Hines-Allen (16)	Charles; Leslie (7)	Natasha Cloud (6)	Gateway Center Arena; 1,122	4–6
11	June 17	Atlanta	W 96–93	Ariel Atkins (32)	Natasha Cloud (9)	Natasha Cloud (11)	Entertainment and Sports Arena; 2,100	5–6
12	June 19	Indiana	W 82–77	Tina Charles (30)	Tina Charles (15)	Theresa Plaisance (4)	Entertainment and Sports Arena; 2,100	6–6
13	June 22	@ Seattle	W 87–83	Tina Charles (34)	Tina Charles (16)	Leilani Mitchell (7)	Angel of the Winds Arena; 2,495	7–6
14	June 24	@ Los Angeles	L 82–89	Leilani Mitchell (26)	Tina Charles (10)	Ariel Atkins (7)	Los Angeles Convention Center; 520	7–7
15	June 26	@ Dallas	L 74–85	Tina Charles (27)	Tina Charles (10)	Leilani Mitchell (7)	College Park Center; 2,055	7–8
16	June 29	Connecticut	L 71–90	Tina Charles (26)	Theresa Plaisance (7)	Ariel Atkins (5)	Entertainment and Sports Arena; 2,100	7–9

July : 1–1 (Home: 0–0; Road: 1–1)

Game	Date	Team	Score	High points	High rebounds	High assists	Location Attendance	Record
17	July 3	@ New York	L 79–82	Tina Charles (31)	Tina Charles (16)	Shavonte Zellous (5)	Barclays Center; 1,615	7–10
18	July 10	@ Chicago	W 89–85 (OT)	Tina Charles (34)	Tina Charles (17)	Natasha Cloud (11)	Wintrust Arena; 8,331	8–10

August : 2–6 (Home: 2–3; Road: 0–3)

Game	Date	Team	Score	High points	High rebounds	High assists	Location Attendance	Record
19	August 15	@ Las Vegas	L 83–84	Atkins; Charles (20)	Charles; Hines-Allen (8)	Natasha Cloud (10)	Michelob Ultra Arena; 3,024	8–11
20	August 17	@ Las Vegas	L 83–93	Tina Charles (30)	Tina Charles (10)	Natasha Cloud (8)	Michelob Ultra Arena; 3,241	8–12
21	August 19	@ Phoenix	L 64–77	Tina Charles (17)	Myisha Hines-Allen (9)	Atkins; Cloud; Plaisance (2)	Phoenix Suns Arena; 5,113	8–13
22	August 22	Seattle	L 78–85	Tina Charles (20)	Myisha Hines-Allen (17)	Natasha Cloud (9)	Entertainment and Sports Arena; 3,114	8–14
23	August 24	Los Angeles	W 78–68	Myisha Hines-Allen (19)	Natasha Cloud (8)	Natasha Cloud (8)	Entertainment and Sports Arena; 2,620	9–14
24	August 26	Dallas	L 77–82	Myisha Hines-Allen (16)	Delle Donne; Hines-Allen; Plaisance (5)	Natasha Cloud (7)	Entertainment and Sports Arena; 2,465	9–15
25	August 28	Dallas	W 76–75	Natasha Cloud (21)	Erica McCall (8)	Natasha Cloud (5)	Entertainment and Sports Arena; 2,410	10–15
26	August 31	Connecticut	L 75–85	Shatori Walker-Kimbrough (17)	Hines-Allen; McCall (5)	Natasha Cloud (12)	Entertainment and Sports Arena; 2,269	10–16

September : 2–4 (Home: 1–1; Road: 1–3)

Game	Date	Team	Score	High points	High rebounds	High assists	Location Attendance	Record
27	September 4	@ Indiana	L 75–93	Ariel Atkins (25)	Tina Charles (8)	Natasha Cloud (6)	Target Center; 3,403	10–17
28	September 7	@ Seattle	L 71–105	Shavonte Zellous (17)	Megan Gustafson (8)	Sydney Wiese (4)	Angel of the Winds Arena; 2,390	10–18
29	September 10	Atlanta	W 82–74	Tina Charles (26)	Tina Charles (16)	Cloud; Plaisance (6)	Entertainment and Sports Arena; 2,320	11–18
30	September 12	@ Chicago	W 79–71	Tina Charles (31)	Tina Charles (10)	Natasha Cloud (8)	Wintrust Arena; 4,707	12–18
31	September 17	@ New York	L 80–91	Ariel Atkins (29)	Cloud; Hines-Allen (5)	Charles; Cloud (7)	Barclays Center; 3,615	12–19
32	September 19	Minnesota	L 77–83	Natasha Cloud (22)	Tina Charles (13)	Natasha Cloud (5)	Entertainment and Sports Arena; 2,854	12–20

2021 season schedule

== Standings ==
#	Team	W	L	PCT	GB	Conf.	Home	Road	Cup
1	x – Connecticut Sun	26	6	.813	–	12–3	15–1	11–5	9–1
2	x – Las Vegas Aces	24	8	.750	2	11–4	13–3	11–5	6–4
3	x – Minnesota Lynx	22	10	.688	4	10–5	13–3	9–7	7–3
4	x – Seattle Storm	21	11	.656	5	9–6	11–5	10–6	8–2
5	x – Phoenix Mercury	19	13	.594	7	6–9	7–9	12–4	5–5
6	x – Chicago Sky	16	16	.500	10	10–5	6–10	10–6	6–4
7	x – Dallas Wings	14	18	.438	12	7–8	7–9	7–9	3–7
8	x – New York Liberty	12	20	.375	14	6–9	7–9	5–11	5–5
9	e – Washington Mystics	12	20	.375	14	7–8	8–8	4–12	4–6
10	e – Los Angeles Sparks	12	20	.375	14	2–13	8–8	4–12	1–9
11	e – Atlanta Dream	8	24	.250	18	6–9	4–12	4–12	4–6
12	e – Indiana Fever	6	26	.188	20	4–11	4–12	2–14	2–8

Notes

(#) – League Standing
x – Clinched playoff berth
e – Eliminated from playoff contention
Source: Overall standings and Commissioner's Cup Standings

== Statistics ==
Legend
GP	Games played	GS	Games started	MPG	Minutes per game	RPG	Rebounds per game
APG	Assists per game	SPG	Steals per game	BPG	Blocks per game	PPG	Points per game
FG%	Field-goal percentage	3P%	3-point field-goal percentage	FT%	Free-throw percentage	TO	Turnovers per game
PF	Fouls per game		Team leader		League leader

=== Regular season ===
Player	GP	GS	MPG	FG%	3P%	FT%	RPG	APG	SPG	BPG	PPG
Tina Charles	27	27	33.3	44.9	36.5	82.0	9.6	2.1	0.9	0.9	23.4
Ariel Atkins	30	30	30.6	40.7	35.9	83.1	2.8	2.6	1.6	0.5	16.2
Elena Delle Donne	3	3	13.7	48.1	60.0	100	4.3	0.7	0.0	0.3	13.7
Myisha Hines-Allen	18	17	25.7	41.4	31.7	73.2	7.0	2.5	1.3	0.6	12.9
Natasha Cloud	27	27	31.6	38.9	27.4	83.6	3.6	6.4	1.4	0.1	8.7
Shatori Walker-Kimbrough	16	13	21.6	51.3	32.0	85.7	1.4	1.0	0.8	0.3	7.4
Leilani Mitchell	31	12	23.4	36.0	35.7	82.6	2.0	2.5	0.5	0.1	6.4
Theresa Plaisance	31	11	18.0	35.1	30.2	81.5	4.4	1.4	0.8	0.7	6.4
Sydney Wiese	27	8	21.4	32.3	29.1	77.8	1.3	1.6	0.4	0.0	4.4
Shavonte Zellous	28	5	15.8	37.7	24.4	80.6	2.4	1.6	0.4	0.2	4.3
Erica McCall	23	6	15.5	50.0	0.0	62.5	4.3	0.6	0.3	0.4	4.1
Megan Gustafson	11	1	9.9	59.4	0.0	66.7	3.6	0.0	0.2	0.1	4.0

== Awards and honors ==
Recipient	Award	Date awarded	Ref.
Tina Charles	Eastern Conference Player of the Week	June 14	
Tina Charles	Eastern Conference Player of the Month - June	July 1	
Ariel Atkins	WNBA All-Star Selection	June 30	
Tina Charles	WNBA All-Star Selection	June 30	
Tina Charles	Eastern Conference Player of the Week	September 13	
Tina Charles	Peak Performer: Points	September 20	
Ariel Atkins	WNBA All-Defensive Second Team	September 26, 2021	
Tina Charles	All-WNBA Second Team	October 15	
