= Holly Springs High School =

Public school in North Carolina, United States

Location
- 5329 Cass Holt Road; Holly Springs, North Carolina 27540; United States; 35.6280°N 78.8490°W

Information
- Type: Public
- Established: 2006 (20 years ago)
- School district: Wake County Public School System
- CEEB code: 341902
- NCES School ID: 370472002847
- Principal: Gary Duvall
- Teaching staff: 106.20 (on FTE basis)
- Grades: 9–12
- Enrollment: 2,111 (2023-2024)
- Student to teacher ratio: 19.88
- Colors: Purple and gold
- Athletics: NCHSAA 7A
- Athletics conference: Triangle Six 6A/7A
- Mascot: Golden Hawk
- Website: Holly Springs High School

Holly Springs High School (HSHS) is a public high school located in Holly Springs, North Carolina, United States. It is part of the Wake County Public School System.

== Athletics ==
Holly Springs High School is a member of the North Carolina High School Athletic Association (NCHSAA) and competes at the 7A level in the Triangle Six 6A/7A conference. The student section is nicknamed the Purple Craze.

In 2011, the Holly Springs baseball team, led by Carlos Rodón, won the NCHSAA 4A (North Carolina's former highest classification for high school athletics) state championship, defeating T. C. Roberson High School.

Traditional rivals include Fuquay-Varina High School, Middle Creek High School, and Apex Friendship High School.

=== Athletic teams ===
==== Fall ====
- Football
- Men's soccer
- Volleyball
- Cross country
- Women's golf
- Cheer
- Women's tennis

==== Winter ====
- Men's basketball
- Women's basketball
- Swimming
- Wrestling
- Indoor track

==== Spring ====
- Baseball
- Softball
- Women's soccer
- Track and field
- Men's lacrosse
- Women's lacrosse
- Men's golf
- Men's tennis
- Stunt

== Notable alumni ==
- Andrew Capobianco, American diver, 3x NCAA champion, silver medalist at the 2020 Summer Olympics
- Bryce Ford-Wheaton, NFL wide receiver
- Kiara Leslie, WNBA player
- Carlos Rodón, MLB pitcher, 3x All-Star selection
- Andrew Wantz, MLB pitcher
- Susana Žigante, American-born Croatian soccer player
