= Kiara Leslie =

American basketball player (born 1995)

Personal information
- Born: December 6, 1995 (age 30) Holly Springs, North Carolina, U.S.
- Listed height: 6 ft 0 in (1.83 m)
- Listed weight: 175 lb (79 kg)

Career information
- High school: Holly Springs (Holly Springs, North Carolina)
- College: Maryland (2014–2017); NC State (2017–2019)
- WNBA draft: 2019: 1st round, 10th overall pick
- Drafted by: Washington Mystics
- Playing career: 2019–present
- Position: Shooting guard

Career history
- 2019–2021: Washington Mystics

Career highlights
- WNBA champion (2019); First-team All-ACC (2019); ACC All-Defensive Team (2019)
- Stats at Basketball Reference

Kiara Leslie (born December 6, 1995) is an American professional basketball player who most recently played for the Washington Mystics of the Women's National Basketball Association (WNBA). Leslie played college basketball for the NC State Wolfpack. After a successful college career at NC State, she was drafted by the Mystics with the 10th overall pick in the 2019 WNBA draft.

Leslie's brother C. J. is also a professional basketball player.

== WNBA career statistics ==
Legend
GP	Games played	GS	Games started	MPG	Minutes per game	RPG	Rebounds per game
APG	Assists per game	SPG	Steals per game	BPG	Blocks per game	PPG	Points per game
TO	Turnovers per game	FG%	Field-goal percentage	3P%	3-point field-goal percentage	FT%	Free-throw percentage
**Bold**	Career best	°	League leader

=== Regular season ===
Year	Team	GP	GS	MPG	FG%	3P%	FT%	RPG	APG	SPG	BPG	TO	PPG
2020	Washington	**19**	**10**	**21.8**	**.352**	**.362**	**.923**	**3.0**	**1.1**	**0.5**	**0.4**	0.9	**5.5**
2021	Washington	9	0	9.6	.333	.286	.875	2.2	0.2	0.4	0.0	0.4	2.8
Career	2 years, 1 team	28	10	17.9	.348	.352	.905	2.8	0.8	0.5	0.3	0.8	4.6

=== Playoffs ===
Year	Team	GP	GS	MPG	FG%	3P%	FT%	RPG	APG	SPG	BPG	TO	PPG
2020	Washington	1	1	33.0	.333	.000	1.000	6.0	4.0	1.0	2.0	1.0	7.0
Career	1 year, 1 team	1	1	33.0	.333	.000	1.000	6.0	4.0	1.0	2.0	1.0	7.0

== Maryland and NC State statistics ==
Legend
GP	Games played	GS	Games started	MPG	Minutes per game
FG%	Field goal percentage	3P%	3-point field goal percentage	FT%	Free throw percentage
RPG	Rebounds per game	APG	Assists per game	SPG	Steals per game
BPG	Blocks per game	PPG	Points per game	**Bold**	Career high

Year	Team	GP	Points	FG%	3P%	FT%	RPG	APG	SPG	BPG	PPG
2014–15	Maryland	**35**	125	40.7%	20.0%	63.6%	2.7	0.5	0.2	0.3	3.6
2015–16	Maryland	32	141	40.8%	**38.5%**	71.4%	3.0	1.0	0.4	0.3	4.4
2016–17	NC State	Sat out due to NCAA transfer rules									
2017–18	NC State	**35**	445	41.4%	32.5%	**71.6%**	5.9	1.7	1.0	0.7	12.7
2018–19	NC State	34	**541**	**41.6%**	38.1%	**71.6%**	**7.2**	**2.8**	**1.1**	**0.8**	**15.9**
Career		136	1252	41.3%	35.2%	70.6%	4.7	1.5	0.7	0.5	9.2
