= Sunset Lake (Holly Springs, North Carolina) =

- Location within North Carolina Location within the United States
- Location: Wake County, North Carolina, United States
- Coordinates: 35°39′06″N 78°47′16″W
- Type: lake
- Basin countries: United States
- Surface area: 125 acres (51 ha)

Sunset Lake is a lake in Holly Springs, North Carolina, part of the central North Carolina near Cary, NC and Apex, NC. Covering 125 acres in southwestern Wake County. The lake is owned by the Sunset Lake Homeowners Association.

== See also ==
- Bass Lake (Holly Springs, North Carolina)
- Bass Lake Dam (Holly Springs, North Carolina)
- Wake County, North Carolina
- Holly Springs, North Carolina
- Fuquay-Varina, North Carolina
