= Harrington-Dewar House =

Historic house in North Carolina, United States

- U.S. National Register of Historic Places
- Location within North Carolina Location within the United States
- Location: 994 Fred Burns Rd., near Holly Springs, North Carolina
- Coordinates: 35°33′13″N 78°54′38″W
- Area: less than one acre
- Architectural style: Greek Revival
- NRHP reference No.: 08001363
- Added to NRHP: January 23, 2009

Harrington-Dewar House is a historic house located near Duncan, NC, Harnett County, North Carolina. The main house dates to 1865, and is a two-story frame I-house with vernacular Greek Revival style design elements. At the rear is an older two-room house built in about 1850 and consists of a 1 1/2-story gabled kitchen and dining room wing. Originally the back ell rooms were entered via the front porch at the time, which became the side porch when the 2 story house was added in 1865. The house was moved to its original location in 1977 when it was cited to be burned down by the owners. It was purchased and moved 5 miles within the Cokesbury Community near the village of Duncan, NC.

https://files.nc.gov/ncdcr/nr/HT0123.pdf

It was listed on the National Register of Historic Places in 2009.

Harrington-Dewar House is now located on a 30-acre tract of old-growth hardwood forest ridge land which rolls downward to Parker Creek. The house and land are a working homestead farm. High Ground Farm, LLC
