= Moore Square Historic District =

Historic district in North Carolina, United States

- U.S. National Register of Historic Places
- U.S. Historic district
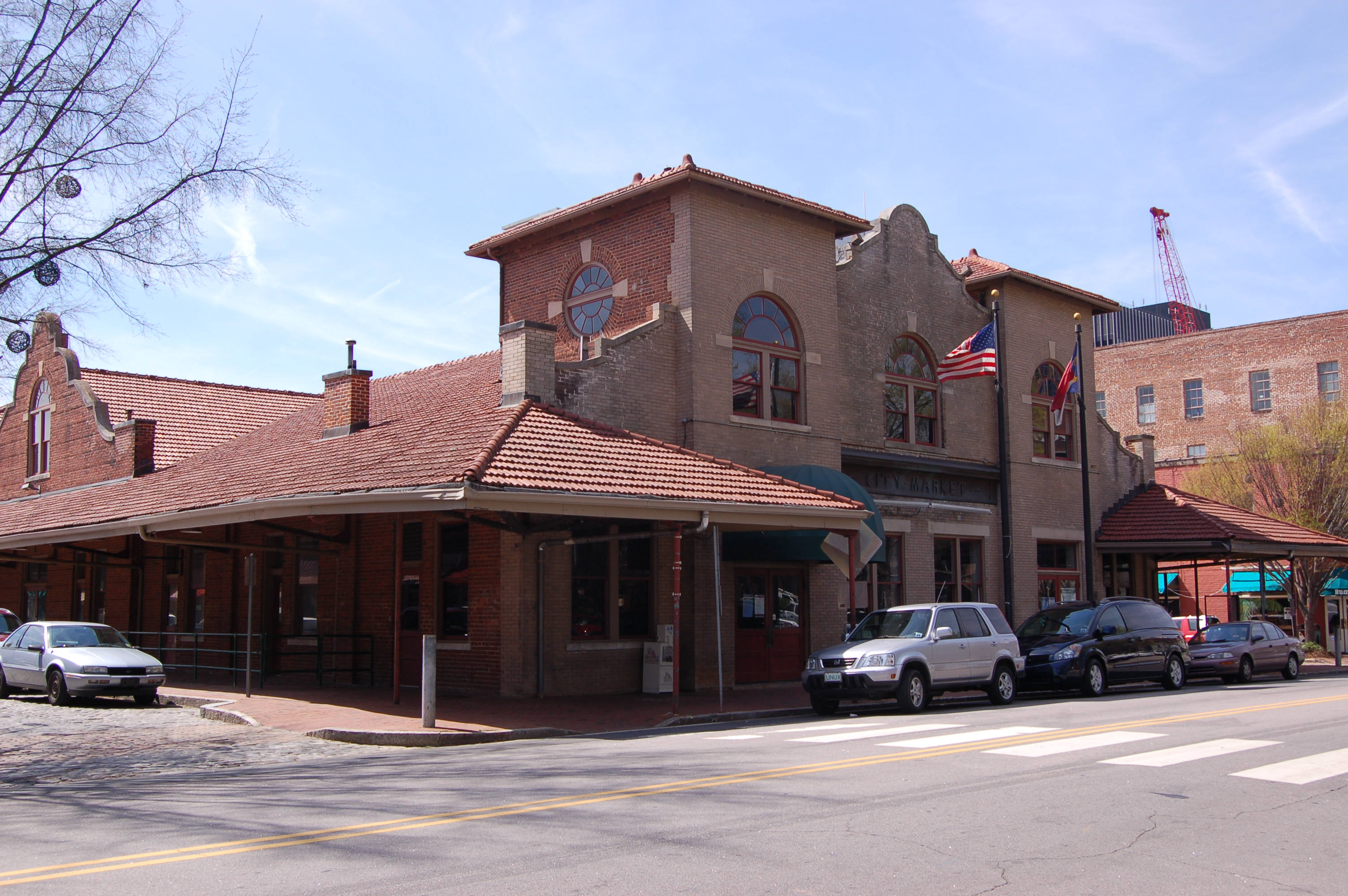
- City Market in the Moore Square Historic District

- Location within North Carolina Location within the United States
- Location: Roughly bounded by Person, Morgan, Wilmington, and Davie Sts., Raleigh, North Carolina
- Coordinates: 35°46′39″N 78°38′14″W
- Area: 29.1 acres (11.8 ha)
- Architect: Multiple
- Architectural style: Gothic, Italianate
- NRHP reference No.: 83001924
- Added to NRHP: August 3, 1983

The Moore Square Historic District is a registered historic district located in downtown Raleigh, North Carolina. Listed on the National Register of Historic Places in 1983, the district is centered on Moore Square, one of two surviving four-acre (1.6 hm) parks from Raleigh's original 1792 plan. The park is named after Alfred Moore, a North Carolina judge who became an Associate Justice on the Supreme Court. Originally a residential neighborhood, Moore Square developed into a primary commercial hub in the city throughout the late 19th and early 20th centuries. The district includes East Hargett Street, once known as Raleigh's "Black Main Street", because it once contained the largest number of businesses owned by African Americans in the city. City Market, Marbles Kids Museum/IMAX theatre, Pope House Museum, Artspace, and the Long View Center are located in the Moore Square district. Events that take place in Moore Square include the Raleigh Arts Festival, Artsplosure, Movies in the Park, the Street Painting Festival, and the Moore Square Farmer's Market The approximate district boundaries include Person, Morgan, Wilmington, and Davie Streets.

In addition to its national listing, Moore Square is one of six local historic overlay districts (HOD) in Raleigh.

The Moore Square Historic District also includes Moore Square Park, which holds the restaurant Square Burger, and includes Moore Square Magnet Middle School, which is part of the Wake County Public School System.

== See also ==
- List of Registered Historic Places in North Carolina
