= Norris-Heartt House =

Historic house in Raleigh, North Carolina

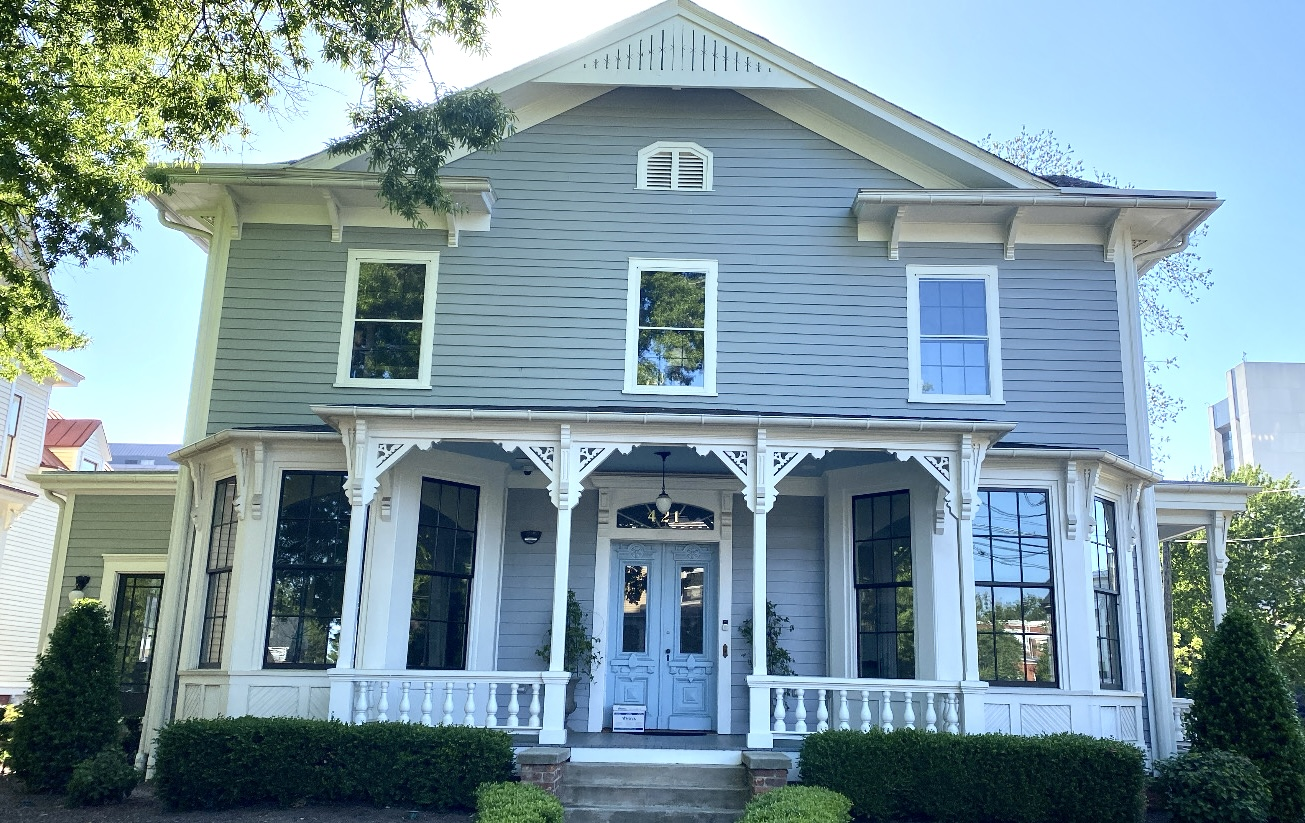
- Norris-Heartt House in 2024
- Alternative names: Norris House; Heartt House

General information
- Status: Active
- Type: Residence
- Architectural style: Victorian
- Location: 421 N Blount Street; Raleigh, North Carolina, U.S.
- Completed: 1879

Norris-Heartt House, also known as Norris House and Heartt House, is a historic Victorian house in Raleigh, North Carolina. The home was built in 1879 and was given as a wedding present for the socialite Cornelia Alice Norris. Following her death in 1935, it was purchased by Leo D. Heartt and converted into a boarding house. It was acquired by the state government in 1968 and housed the offices of the North Carolina State Bureau of Investigation and the North Carolina State Office of Archaeology. It was vacated in 2007. The house underwent renovations from 2016 to 2018 and is now used as a private event venue.

== History ==
Norris-Heartt House was constructed on North Blount Street in 1879 by Alexander Boyd Andrews and was purchased by Jesse Allen Norris and Amy Ann Adams Norris as a wedding present for their daughter, Cornelia Alice Norris, and her husband, the merchant Matthew Tyson Norris. Her parents deeded the house exclusively in her name, not her husband's. The Norrises lived their entire married lives in the home and raised their five children in it. Cornelia Norris was a prominent Raleigh socialite who founded the Caswell-Nash Chapter of the Daughters of the American Revolution, and the local press wrote about her entertaining in the home.

Matthew Norris died in 1915. Following Cornelia's death in 1935, the house was sold to Leo D. Heartt. The Heartt family enlarged the house, converted it into a boarding house, and removed the original Italianate designs on the front, as well as interior decorative trim and some of the fireplaces, and replaced them with colonial features.

In 1968, the state government acquired the house from Heartt's widow and converted it into an office building housing the North Carolina State Bureau of Investigation and the North Carolina State Office of Archaeology. The state archaeology office used the house as a curation space for artifacts and site files as well as an office space. The state's artifacts were relocated to a new research center in 1997 and the state office moved into the North Carolina Archives and History Building in 2007.

After being vacant and falling into disrepair under government ownership, the house was sold and began being renovated in 2016, finishing in 2018. The 1930s addition of a two-story Colonial Revival front porch was removed and replaced with the original style Italianate Victorian front elevation. The Italianate elevation was made following historical records and the original masonry foundation, unearthed on site in April 2017. The house interior includes original doors, trim, stained glass windows, and a fireplace with mantel. The house is now used as a venue for private events.
