= Holly Springs Masonic Lodge =

- U.S. National Register of Historic Places
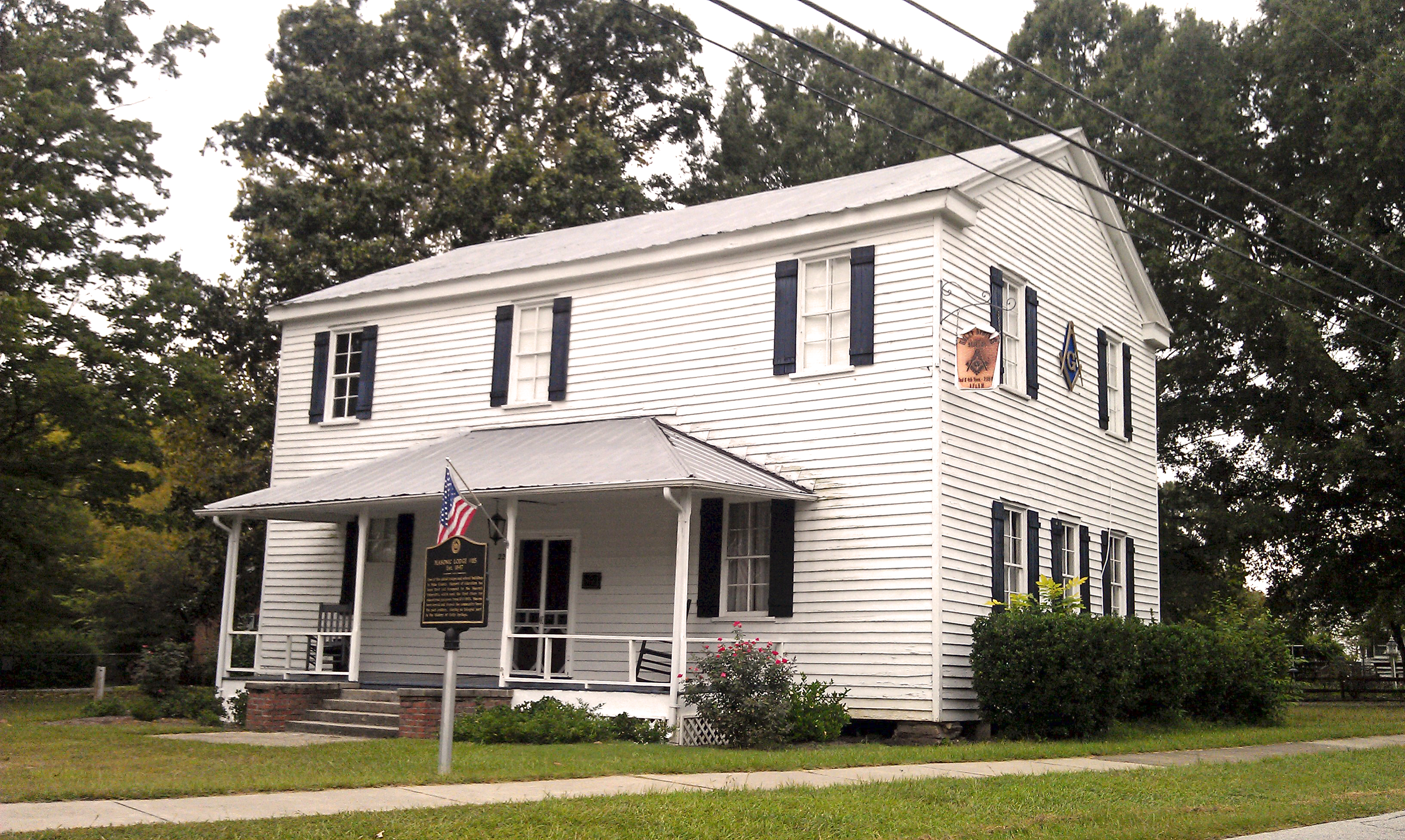
- Holly Springs Masonic Lodge, September 2012

- Location within North Carolina Location within the United States
- Location: 224 Raleigh St., Holly Springs, North Carolina
- Coordinates: 35°39′13″N 78°49′57″W
- Area: 0.8 acres (0.32 ha)
- Built: c. 1852
- Architectural style: Greek Revival
- MPS: Wake County MPS
- NRHP reference No.: 10000164
- Added to NRHP: April 7, 2010

Holly Springs Masonic Lodge is a historic Masonic Lodge located at Holly Springs, Wake County, North Carolina. It was built about 1852, and is a two-story, Greek Revival influenced frame building with a side gable roof. It has a one-story, hip roofed front porch. In addition to being a Masonic Lodge, the building also housed a school.

It was listed on the National Register of Historic Places in 2010.
