= Norris-Holland-Hare House =

Historic farm house in Holly Springs, North Carolina

General information
- Status: Private residence
- Type: farmhouse
- Architectural style: Federal
- Location: 2329 Avent Ferry Road; Holly Springs, North Carolina, U.S.
- Completed: 1805

The Norris-Holland-Hare House is a historic Federal style farm house in Holly Springs, North Carolina. It is the oldest building in the town of Holly Springs. The house was used as a field hospital by the Union Army following the Battle of Bentonville of the American Civil War.

== History ==
The Norris-Holland-Hare House was built around 1805 by Needham Norris, a Baptist minister and the son of American Revolutionary War veteran Pvt. John Norris Jr. Needham Norris was the grandfather of the Raleigh socialite Cornelia Alice Norris. The house was constructed on a portion of a land grant given to John Norris Jr. Built in the Federal style, the house features wood sash windows, plain weatherboards, stone foundation piers, and Flemish bond brick chimneys. Norris bequeathed the house and farm to his nephew, Simpson Washington Holland.

In September 1864, Holland traveled to Virginia to search for his brother, a Confederate soldier fighting in the American Civil War. Holland died two months later, without having returned home. The widowed Mary Ann Matthews Holland was left to care for their young children.

In April 1865, after the Battle of Bentonville, an encampment of Union soldiers encircled the house. The family lived upstairs while the soldiers occupied the first floor as a field hospital.

The home later passed to the Hare family, descendants of the Hollands, who owned it until 2004.

In 2017, the town purchased the 1,904-square-foot house to save it from demolition, with plans to sell it with preservation requirements. The home was purchased by a family later that year.
