= Leslie-Alford-Mims House =

Historic house in North Carolina, United States

- U.S. National Register of Historic Places
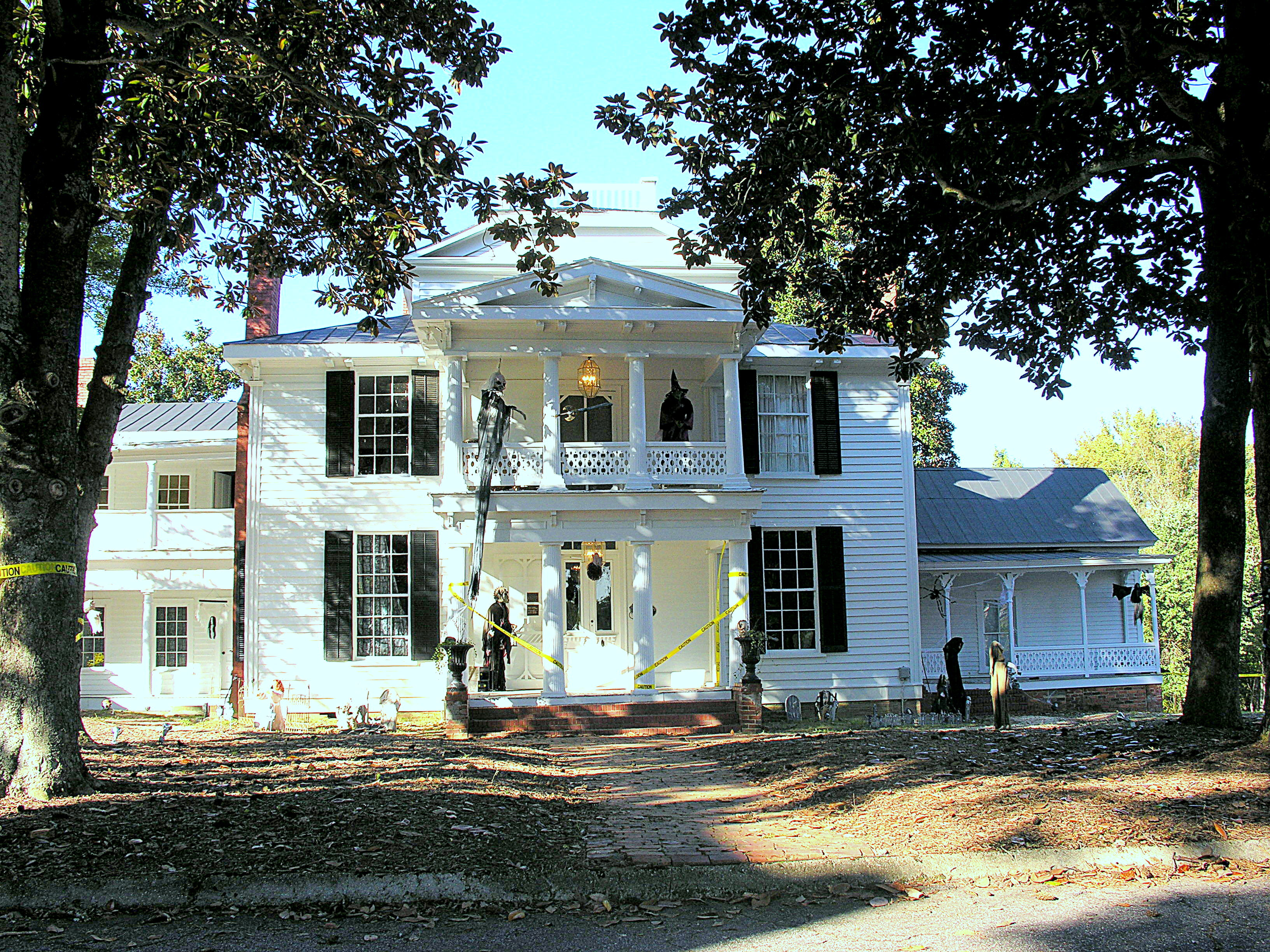
- Front elevation Leslie-Alford-Mims House, October 2013

- Location within North Carolina Location within the United States
- Location: 100 Avent Ferry Rd., Holly Springs, North Carolina
- Coordinates: 35°39′07″N 78°50′11″W
- Area: 13.3 acres (5.4 ha)
- Built: c. 1840, c. 1876, c. 1900
- Architectural style: Greek Revival, Colonial Revival
- MPS: Wake County MPS
- NRHP reference No.: 97000218
- Added to NRHP: March 8, 1997

Leslie-Alford-Mims House is a historic home located near Holly Springs in Wake County, North Carolina.

== History ==
The original section of the house was built about 1840, and is a two-story, Greek Revival-style frame dwelling. The front facade features two-tier, pedimented Doric order entrance portico. Additions and modifications were made to house about 1876 and 1900, and includes Colonial Revival style design elements. Also on the property is a contributing family cemetery.

During the American Civil War, a segment of the Union Army set up headquarters in the house.

It was listed on the National Register of Historic Places in 1997.

The Leslie-Alford-Mims House is now operated as a wedding venue by Brooke Everhart.
