= Hoke Norris =

American journalist

- Born: Hoke Marion Norris; October 8, 1913; Holly Springs, North Carolina, U.S.
- Died: July 8, 1977 (aged 63); Chicago, Illinois, U.S.
- Occupations: Journalist and author
- Spouse: Edna Dees (m. 1941)
- Children: Marion Dees Norris

Hoke Marion Norris (October 8, 1913 – July 8, 1977) was a Chicago journalist whose reporting during the Civil Rights Movement had a significant impact on popular opinion in Chicago.

Born in 1913 in Holly Springs, North Carolina, Norris studied journalism at Wake Forest College. He married Edna Dees Norris of North Carolina and had one child, a daughter, Marion Dees Norris. His first journalism job was writing for the Daily Advance in Elizabeth City, NC, which he left to write for the Raleigh News and Observer. He then worked for the Associated Press before joining the Army Air Force in 1942. When his tour of duty ended, he returned to AP.

After studying at Harvard University on a Nieman Fellowship in 1950, Norris became a reporter and editor at the Chicago Sun-Times. Although he was literary editor, he took on a news reporter role during the Civil Rights Movement, and sent dispatches from the South. During the 1970s, he taught and was an administrator at the University of Chicago and was on the editorial board of the Chicago Daily News.

Norris's literary career included the novels All the Kingdoms of the Earth (1956) and It's Not Far but I Don't Know the Way (1968), and the collection of essays We Dissent (1962).

Hoke Norris died in 1977.
