= Gretchen Zigante =

American soccer player (born 1964)

Personal information
- Full name: Gretchen Marie Zigante
- Birth name: Gretchen Marie Gegg
- Date of birth: October 6, 1964 (age 62)
- Place of birth: Tacoma, Washington, United States
- Height: 5 ft 6 in (1.68 m)
- Position: Goalkeeper

Youth career
- Bellarmine Lions

College career
Years	Team	Apps	(Gls)
–1986	North Carolina Tar Heels	21	(0)

Senior career*
Years	Team	Apps	(Gls)
- Fujita Tendai SC Mercury

International career
1986–1990	United States	2	(0)

Managerial career
- 1990: Colorado College Tigers (assistant)
- Shiroki FC Serena (goalkeeping coach)
- 1995–1997: Cal State San Bernardino Coyotes
- 1998–1999: San Diego State Aztecs (assistant)
- Sereno Soccer Club
- 2002–2006: Cornell Big Red (assistant)
- 2006: Cornell Big Red (interim)
- TC United
- 2018–: Wasatch Wasps
- * Club domestic league appearances and goals

Gretchen Marie Zigante (née Gegg; born October 6, 1964) is an American former soccer player who played as a goalkeeper, making two appearances for the United States women's national team.

== Career ==
During college, Zigante played for the North Carolina Tar Heels, where she was the starting goalkeeper in her senior season of 1986 where the team won the 1986 NCAA Division I Women's Soccer Tournament. She later joined Japanese club Fujita Tendai SC Mercury, where she spent five seasons before retiring.

Zigante made her international debut for the United States on July 9, 1986 against Canada in a play-off for the 1986 North American Cup title (a friendly tournament). The match, which lasted 30 minutes, was won by the U.S 3–0 to win the tournament. Her second and final cap came on July 27, 1990 in a friendly match against Canada.

Zigante holds a U.S. Soccer B coaching license, and previously held an A license. After graduating from college, Zigante began working as an assistant coach for the Colorado College Tigers, where she primarily focused on goalkeeper training. After retiring from her playing career, she started working as a goalkeeping coach in Japan with Shiroki FC Serena for two years. She later returned to the U.S., becoming the head coach of the Cal State San Bernardino Coyotes in 1995, where she won the Coach of the Year award from the California Collegiate Athletic Association. She later served as the assistant for the San Diego State Aztecs, before joining the youth team Sereno Soccer Club where she helped coach, develop youth curriculum, and manage the program. In 2002, she joined as an assistant coach for Cornell Big Red, before leading the team as the interim head coach during the 2006 season. She also founded and coached TC United in Ithaca, New York. In 2018, she became the head coach of Wasatch High School Wasps women's soccer team in Heber City, Utah.

== Personal life ==
Gretchen is married to Nenad "Ziggy" Žigante, a former Croatian footballer and coach born in Yugoslavia. They have two children, with her daughter Susana also playing soccer as a goalkeeper. With eligibility through her father, she is capped to the Croatia national team.

== Career statistics ==
=== International ===
United States
Year	Apps	Goals
1986	1	0
1990	1	0
Total	2	0

== Honors ==
United States

- 1986 North American Cup
