= Rider Broncs women's basketball =

Rider Broncs
2025–26 Rider Broncs women's basketball team
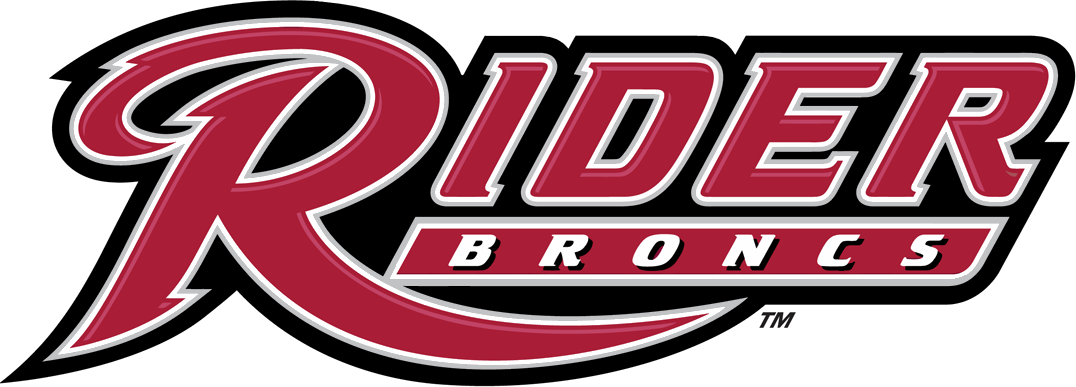
- University: Rider University
- Head coach: Jackie Hartzell (1st season)
- Location: Lawrenceville, New Jersey
- Arena: Canastra Hammer Arena (capacity: 1,950)
- Conference: MAAC
- Nickname: Broncs
- Colors: Cranberry, white, and gray

Conference regular-season champions
- 2020

Uniforms
Home	Away

The Rider Broncs women's basketball team is the basketball team that represents Rider University in Lawrenceville, New Jersey. The school's team competes in the Metro Atlantic Athletic Conference.

== History ==
Rider's first season in women's basketball was in 1925, though they had periods where they did not play basketball, such as 1926–27, 1930–32, 1958–59, 1962–63, and 1966–1974. They played in the East Coast Conference (ECC) from 1982 to 1992 and the Northeast Conference from 1992 to 1997 before joining the Metro Atlantic Athletic Conference (MAAC) in 1997. They won their first regular season conference championship in 2019-20.

=== Postseason appearances ===
The Broncs have made two postseason appearances, doing so in 2017 and 2019 in the WNIT. They have a 0–2 record.

Year	Round	Opponent	Result
2017	First round	Virginia Tech	L 62–76
2019	First round	West Virginia	L 43–83

=== Drafted Players ===
The program's all-time leading scorer Stella Johnson (basketball) was drafted 29th overall by the Phoenix Mercury in the 2019 WNBA draft. She has since played 15 games with the Chicago Sky and Washington Mystics in two seasons.
