= Susana Žigante =

American-born Croatian footballer

Personal information
- Full name: Susana Renata Žigante
- Date of birth: 22 September 1994 (age 32)
- Place of birth: Holly Springs, North Carolina, United States
- Height: 1.70 m (5 ft 7 in)
- Position: Goalkeeper

Youth career
- Triangle Futbol Club
- –2012: Holly Springs Hawks

College career
Years	Team	Apps	(Gls)
2012	Grand Canyon Antelopes	1	(0)
2013	UNC Asheville Bulldogs	5	(0)

Senior career*
Years	Team	Apps	(Gls)
- Oak City United
- ŽNK Osijek

International career^{‡}
2010–2012	Croatia U19	8	(0)
2017–	Croatia	1+	(0)
- * Club domestic league appearances and goals as of 02:41, 10 August 2019 (UTC) ‡ National team caps and goals as of 02:41, 10 August 2019 (UTC)

Susana Renata Žigante (born 22 September 1994) is an American-born Croatian footballer who plays as a goalkeeper, and has been capped to the Croatia national team.

== Career ==
In college, Žigante played for the Grand Canyon Antelopes, make one appearance for the team in 2012. She later played for the UNC Asheville Bulldogs in 2013.

Žigante has appeared for the Croatia national team, including a 3–1 win against Slovenia on 8 March 2017.

== Personal life ==
Žigante's mother Gretchen is a former goalkeeper who played for the United States. Her father, Nenad "Ziggy" Zigante, is a Croatian former footballer and coach born in Yugoslavia. Thus she was eligible to represent Croatia internationally through her father.
