= Sunset Lake (Portage County, Wisconsin) =

Lake in the state of Wisconsin, United States

- Location within Wisconsin Location within the United States
- Location: Portage County, Wisconsin
- Coordinates: 44°32′41″N 89°16′38″W
- Type: lake

Sunset Lake is a lake in the U.S. state of Wisconsin.

Sunset Lake was named in the 1920s.
