= Holly Springs, North Carolina =

- Town
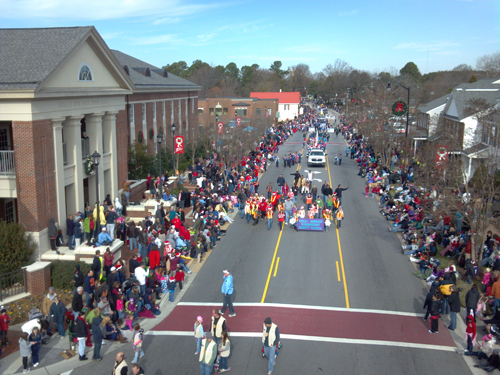
- Downtown Holly Springs

- Flag Seal Logo

- Location in Wake County and the state of North Carolina
- Coordinates: 35°37′06″N 78°50′52″W
- Country: United States
- State: North Carolina
- County: Wake
- Incorporated: 1877

Government
  - Mayor: Mike Kondratick

Area
  - Total: 18.68 sq mi (48.39 km^{2})
  - Land: 18.56 sq mi (48.08 km^{2})
  - Water: 0.12 sq mi (0.31 km^{2})
- Elevation: 423 ft (129 m)

Population (2020)
  - Total: 41,239
  - Density: 2,221.3/sq mi (857.65/km^{2})
- Time zone: UTC−5 (Eastern (EST))
  - Summer (DST): UTC−4 (EDT)
- ZIP code: 27540
- Area code: 919
- FIPS code: 37-32260
- GNIS feature ID: 2405854
- Website: www.hollyspringsnc.gov

Holly Springs is a town in Wake County, North Carolina, United States. As of the 2020 census, the town population was 41,239, a 67% increase from 2010.

== History ==
=== Etymology ===
The town's name refers to the free-flowing springs that merge into a stream and small lake surrounded by large, mature holly trees.

=== Early history ===
The Tuscarora Indians used the area around Holly Springs as a hunting ground prior to colonial settlement. This tribe fled North Carolina around 1720 to escape the influx of Europeans, and eventually became the sixth nation of the Iroquois.

The town of Holly Springs grew around freshwater springs, believed to be the original "holly springs", near the intersection of what is now Avent Ferry Road and Cass Holt Road. These roads linked Raleigh to the Cape Fear River and ultimately to Fayetteville, as well as linking Hillsborough to Smithfield.

=== 19th century ===
By 1800, the crossroads had spawned a village, including a general store built by Richard Jones, a Baptist church, and a Masonic lodge. In 1805, the Baptist minister Needham Norris built his house on land granted to his father, a Revolutionary War veteran. These buildings were soon followed by a sawmill and cotton gin. Archibald Leslie, a Scottish tailor, arrived in the community around 1817, opened a tailoring business and a store, and soon began construction of a house near the springs. This 38-room mansion, now known as the Leslie-Alford-Mims House, is located off Avent Ferry Road near Town Hall. Holly Springs Baptist Church, established in 1822, was the town's first successful church. The Masonic Lodge #115 was formed in 1847, and in 1854 a two-story lodge building was erected. This building also served as one of the town's first schools. Holly Springs Academy opened its doors in 1854 to prepare young men for admission to Wake Forest College.Two years later, the first floor of the lodge was used as a school for local girls. The lodge was honored with a historical-site plaque in the fall of 2006.

During the Civil War, North Carolina seceded from the Union. Captain Oscar R. Rand recruited willing men of all ages to join Governor Zebulon Baird Vance's 26th Infantry Regiment in the Confederate States Army. On a single day at the Battle of Gettysburg, during the assault known as Pickett's Charge, 13 of the 14 commanding officers died. Only 81 soldiers, out of a unit of 880, survived. With the men of the town gone, both schools in Holly Springs closed, and Holly Springs became a virtual ghost town. When the Union Army retreated northward, Holly Springs lay in its path. Bands of marauding robbers known as "bummers" raided the area farms and homesteads, taking food, supplies, silver, clothes, and anything of value.

Also during the war, for a two-week period, a segment of the Union Army encamped near Holly Springs and set up headquarters in the Leslie-Alford-Mims House. Mrs. Leslie reportedly hated the Yankees bitterly, but loved her home more, so she treated them with cool civility. This may have protected the house from destruction, the fate of many other grand southern houses. Mrs. Leslie is said to have “charmed the soldiers so that they didn't burn the house down, but they did get the chickens.” Union troops turned the Norris-Holland house into a field hospital for Union soldiers, nursed by Mary Ann Matthews Holland.

The little community of Holly Springs had appeared to be on its way to becoming a bustling town, but the Civil War ultimately left the community economically devastated. Some families moved away. The exodus was encouraged by construction of the Chatham Railroad through the village of Apex, giving that neighboring town a link to the outside world, which Holly Springs did not have. Historian M. N. Amis described Holly Springs in 1871 as "a deserted village."

The Town of Holly Springs was incorporated in 1877.

In 1875, George Benton Alford moved his successful mercantile business from Middle Creek Township to Holly Springs, and was instrumental in beginning an economic revival in the community. A year later, he bought the Leslie house, which was the centerpiece of the village. Over the years, he made significant additions and improvements to the house until it became one of the largest mansions in Wake County, one of the few with its own ballroom.

Alford, a businessman and politician, started several businesses, including a mercantile store, a sawmill, a cotton gin, and the Holly Springs Land and Improvement Company, and eventually, the General Assembly granted the town a charter. He started a newspaper, The Cape Fear Enterprise, which he used to promote the town. He also got other prominent men in the community to join him in seeking a charter of incorporation for the Cape Fear and Northern Railroad, which became the Durham and Southern Railway. During the postwar period, several attempts were made to revive the Holly Springs Academy, but none was successful. For a time, children were taught in private homes, and eventually the first co-educational school, serving 125 students, was opened by the Masons.

=== 20th century ===
In 1906, the town addressed the need for a larger and better-equipped facility to educate the children. Under the leadership of Raymond A. Burt, J. Carter, and the Women's School Betterment Association, 10 acres (40,000 m^{2}) near the springs were purchased (this was, in time, the site of the library and cultural arts center). The first bell rang for classes in 1908.

By this point, Alford was a wealthy man, and he had dreams of turning Holly Springs into an industrial town of 10,000 people. The town's population had not increased a great deal, holding at around 300, but the business community and the schools were drawing outsiders. The flourishing village was once again struck down by war with the start of World War I. The young men went off to fight, and many others went away to work in war-related industry. In 1923, Alford died, leaving the town without an effective voice in political circles. Then came the Great Depression. The Bank of Holly Springs, established before the turn of the 20th century, failed in 1924. Holly Springs experienced difficulty during this time, although Works Progress Administration funds were used to build a school auditorium. The town missed out on the new federal road-building projects being carried out to provide employment.

World War II did what World War I had done, drawing more young people away from Holly Springs to war and/or to cities for jobs. At the close of the war, Holly Springs was faced with a stagnant population. During the early 1950s, while most Piedmont cities and towns were booming, Holly Springs remained at a standstill.

During the early 1960s, with a population stabilized at around 580, the town installed fluorescent streetlights about the same time that Highway 55 (Main Street) was widened. A general clean-up effort netted the town an award from a state appearance committee. Racially, the town became less balanced with a stronger minority population existing to the late 1980s. During this period, several black businesses were flourishing; a dry-cleaning business, barbershop, three neighborhood stores, and the local gathering place of the "Packhouse" built by one of the town's prominent black citizens by the name of George Grigsby, for whom Grigsby Avenue (previously called Old Fuquay Road) was named. The town board consisted of many of its prominent black citizens, among them Burnis Lassiter, Cora Lassiter, James Norris (Holly Springs' first black mayor), John McNeil, Edison Perkins, George Kimble, and "Preacher" Beckwith. Later, in the 1980s other prominent black citizens joined the town council, among them Nancy Womble, Reverend Otis Byrd, and Parrish "Ham" Womble, who served on the council for 28 years and was also interim mayor for a year.

During this period, the town hired Dessie Mae Womble, the first black female chief of police in North Carolina. As segregation gave way to integration, the Holly Springs School for Blacks was closed, and many of its students were sent to surrounding communities to further their educations. This was the beginning of an era of busing for the community, which continued until the late 1990s, when Holly Springs Elementary School on Holly Springs Road was opened.

The town built its first sewage plant in 1987, then real growth occurred. Holly Springs, in line for the spillover from increased populations in Cary and Apex, suddenly boomed; its population increased from 900 in 1992 to an estimated 6,000 in 1998 to nearly 25,000 in 2010. This video shows the growth over that time along the Avent Ferry corridor.

=== 21st century ===
Bristol-Myers Squibb expressed interest in county-owned land along N.C. 55 Bypass at the future interchange of Interstate 540. The county originally expressed a desire to allow the proposed landfill site to be used for economic development to be sold to the company, but county leaders refused to relocate a solid-waste transfer station which would be at the entrance. When the company decided not to locate on the site, the Wake County Board of Commissioners voted five to two to proceed with plans to build a landfill there.

On April 16, 2011, a large tornado touched down close to the Holly Springs town center, uprooting trees and destroying homes and buildings.

== Geography ==
According to the United States Census Bureau, the town has a total area of 15.1 square miles (39.2 km^{2}), of which 0.12 square miles (0.3 km^{2}), or 0.78%, is covered by water. Neighboring towns include Apex to the north and Fuquay-Varina to the south.

== Demographics ==
Historical population
Census	Pop.	Note	%±
1890	218		—
1900	219		0.5%
1910	261		19.2%
1920	333		27.6%
1930	362		8.7%
1940	394		8.8%
1950	406		3.0%
1960	558		37.4%
1970	697		24.9%
1980	688		−1.3%
1990	908		32.0%
2000	9,192		912.3%
2010	24,661		168.3%
2020	41,239		67.2%
2025 (est.)	50,288	▲	21.9%
U.S. Decennial Census

=== 2020 census ===
As of the 2020 census, Holly Springs had a population of 41,239. The median age was 35.2 years. 32.8% of residents were under the age of 18 and 8.2% of residents were 65 years of age or older. For every 100 females there were 93.2 males, and for every 100 females age 18 and over there were 90.5 males age 18 and over.

99.8% of residents lived in urban areas, while 0.2% lived in rural areas.

Holly Springs racial composition
Race	Number	Percentage
White (non-Hispanic)	30,249	73.35%
Black or African American (non-Hispanic)	3,512	8.52%
Native American	82	0.2%
Asian	2,239	5.43%
Pacific Islander	14	0.03%
Other/mixed	2,252	5.46%
Hispanic or Latino	2,891	7.01%

There were 13,396 households in Holly Springs, including 11,202 family households and 9,307 married-couple family households. Of all households, 54.2% had children under the age of 18 living in them, 8.6% were households with a male householder and no spouse or partner present, and 18.2% were households with a female householder and no spouse or partner present. About 14.0% of all households were made up of individuals, and 4.6% had someone living alone who was 65 years of age or older.

There were 14,237 housing units, of which 5.9% were vacant. The homeowner vacancy rate was 3.1% and the rental vacancy rate was 9.5%.

=== 2010 census ===
As of the 2010 census, 24,661 people, 8,147 households, and 6,706 families lived in the town. The population density was 1,633.18 people per square mile. The town had 8,658 housing units. The racial makeup of the town was 79.8% White, 12.6% African American, 0.4% Native American, 2.9% Asian, 1.8% from other races, and 2.5% from two or more races. Hispanics or Latinos of any race were 6.30% of the population.

Of the 8,147 households, 55.5% had children under 18 living with them, 70.1% were married couples living together, 9.4% had a female householder with no husband present, and 17.7% were not families. About 14.5% of all households were made up of individuals, and 2.9% had someone living alone who was 65 or older. The average household size was 3.03, and the average family size was 3.38.

In the town, the age distribution was 32.4% under 18, 5.0% from 18 to 24, 45.0% from 25 to 44, 15.9% from 45 to 64, and 4.9% who were 65 or older. The median age was 33.1 years. For every 100 females, there were 97.3 males. The population was 51.4% female and 48.6% male.

The median income for a household in the town was $85,000, and for a family was $92,539. Males had a median income of $66,630 versus $43,326 for females. The per capita income for the town was $31,527. About 2.6% of families and 3.7% of the population were below the poverty line, including 4.7% of those under age 18 and 12.9% of those age 65 or over.

=== 2000 census ===
As of the 2000 census, 9,192 people, 3,316 households, and 2,609 families resided in the town. The town had 3,642 housing units.

== Economy ==
In 2006, pharmaceutical company Novartis announced it would be building a manufacturing facility in Holly Springs and employing about 350 to produce flu vaccines using new technologies. The manufacturing facility was built on 167 acres (0.68 km^{2}) in Holly Springs Business Park. Construction was completed in late 2008. Novartis's investment is at least US$267 million and eventually could reach US$600 million.

Fujifilm Diosynth Biotechnologies opened a production plant in 2025.

== Arts and culture ==
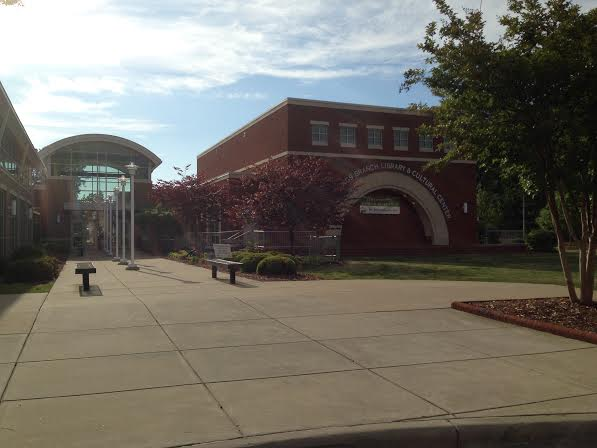
Holly Springs Branch Library

Holly Springs Community Library, part of the Wake County Public Library system, and a cultural-arts facility opened in early December 2006.

The Harrington-Dewar House, Holly Springs Masonic Lodge, and Leslie-Alford-Mims House are listed on the National Register of Historic Places. A historic marker was placed at the Norris-Holland-Hare House by the North Carolina Highway Historical Marker Program.

== Sports ==
The Holly Springs Salamanders, founded in 2015, are a collegiate summer baseball team in the Coastal Plain League.

== Parks and recreation ==
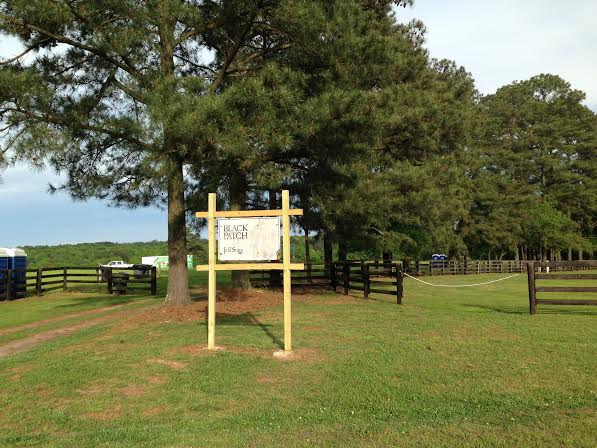
Sugg Farm

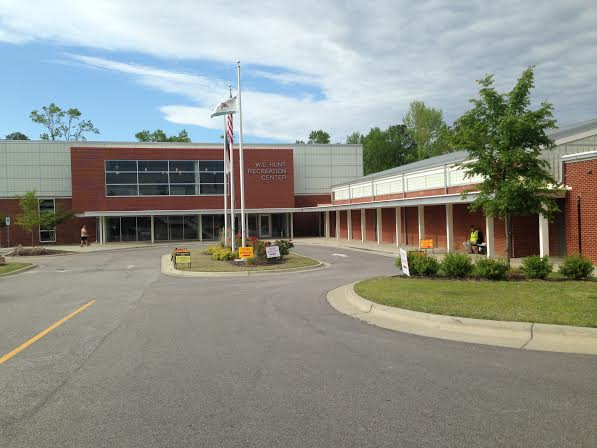
W.E. Hunt Recreation Center

Public recreation facilities include:

- Bass Lake Park
- Capital Area Greenway
- Holly Springs Cultural Center
- Jones Park
- North Main Athletic Complex
- Parrish Womble Park
- Sugg Farm Park
- W.E. Hunt Recreation Center

== Education ==
=== Public charter schools ===
- Pine Springs Preparatory Academy

=== Public schools ===
Wake County Public School System:

- Buckhorn Creek Elementary School
- Holly Grove Elementary School
- Holly Ridge Elementary School
- Holly Springs Elementary School
- Oakview Elementary School
- Holly Ridge Middle School
- Holly Grove Middle School
- Holly Springs High School

=== Private schools ===
- The New School Montessori Center
- Primrose School at Holly Grove
- Thales Academy at Holly Springs

== Notable people ==
- Andrew Capobianco, Olympic diver, won silver medal at the 2020 Summer Olympics
- Daniel Dhers, professional BMX rider
- Brad Fritsch, professional golfer
- C. J. Leslie, professional basketball player
- Kiara Leslie, WNBA player
- Cornelia Alice Norris, socialite and genealogist
- Hoke Norris, journalist and author
- Carlos Rodón, MLB pitcher
- Andrew Wantz, MLB pitcher
- Susana Žigante, women's soccer player, member of the Croatia women's national team
