= City Market (Raleigh, North Carolina) =

Market in Raleigh, North Carolina

Coordinates: 35.77650°N 78.63598°W

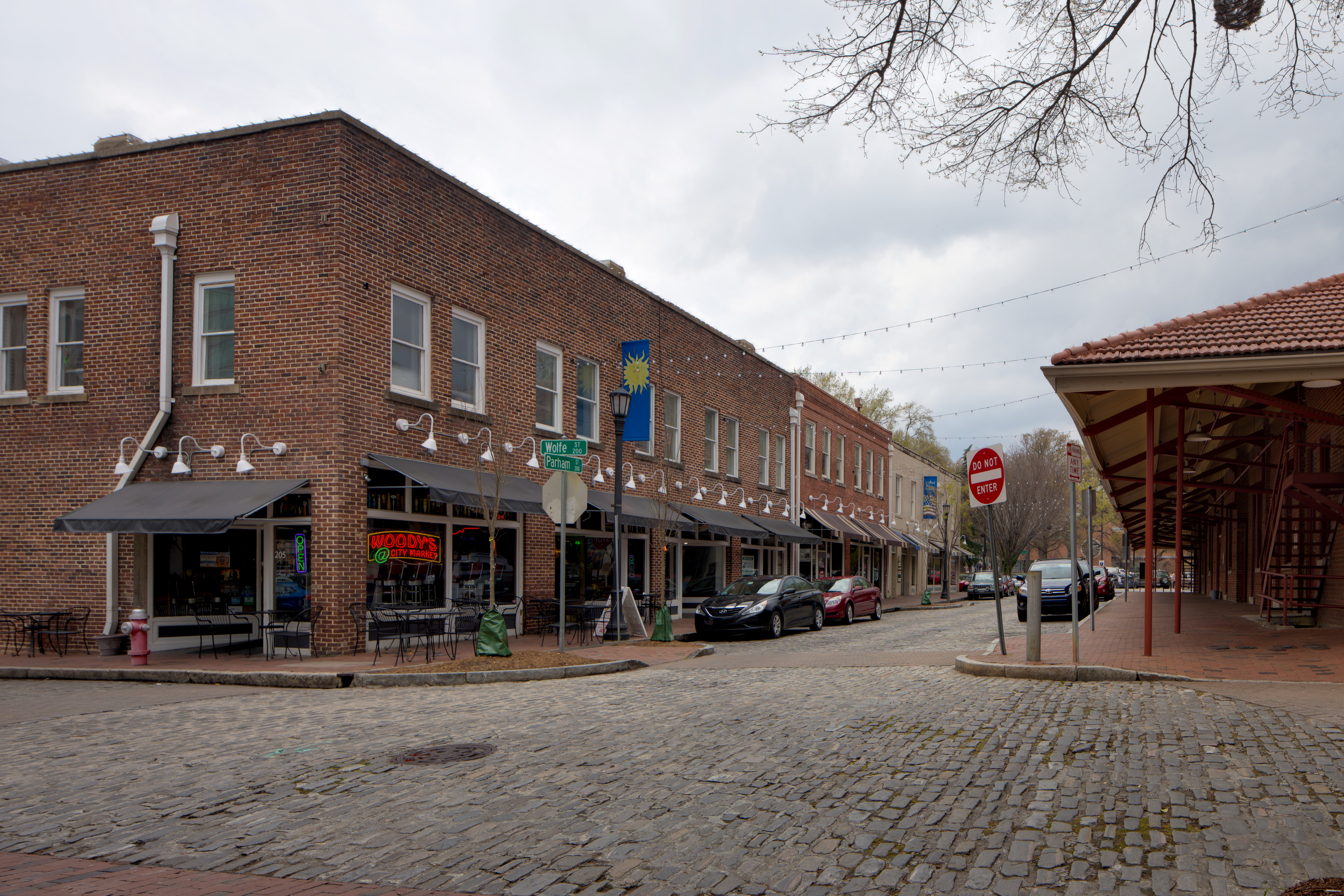
City Market

City Market is a market located in Raleigh, North Carolina, United States. It was founded in October 1914. It became known as a historic place when the Raleigh City Council secured a grant from the North Carolina Division of Archives & History to study the architectural resources surrounding Moore Square in 1980. It is one of the major tourist attractions in Raleigh. In early May 2008, the market was the location of an art project unveiling by the Visual Art Exchange. The market hosts a monthly festival, First Friday, on the first Friday of every month.

== History ==
City Market in Raleigh was built on October 1, 1914. The architect for the project was Wayne County native James Matthew Kennedy. The market flourished until the advent of supermarkets in the 1950s which led to its demise. Joe Hakan and his son purchased and upgraded the place in the 1990s and it prospered again.
