= 1998 Los Angeles Sparks season =

- Head coach: Julie Rousseau (fired Jul. 16, 7–13 record); Orlando Woolridge (5–5 record)
- Arena: Great Western Forum

Results
- Record: 12–18 (.400)
- Place: 3rd (Western)
- Playoff finish: Did not qualify

The 1998 WNBA season was the second for the Los Angeles Sparks. The Sparks missed out of the playoffs for the second consecutive season. It would be the last season they missed the playoffs until the 2007 season.

== Transactions ==
=== Washington Mystics expansion draft ===
The following player was selected in the Washington Mystics expansion draft from the Los Angeles Sparks:

Player	Nationality	School/Team/Country
Heidi Burge	United States	Virginia

=== WNBA draft ===
Round	Pick	Player	Nationality	School/Team/Country
1	5	Allison Feaster	United States	Harvard
2	15	Octavia Blue	United States	Miami
3	25	Rehema Stephens	United States	UCLA
4	35	Erica Kienast	United States	UC Santa Barbara

=== Transactions ===
Date	Transaction
February 18, 1998	Lost Heidi Burge to the Washington Mystics in the WNBA expansion draft
April 9, 1998	Traded Linda Burgess to the Sacramento Monarchs in exchange for Pamela McGee
April 29, 1998	Drafted Allison Feaster, Octavia Blue, Rehema Stephens and Erica Kienast in the 1998 WNBA draft
May 11, 1998	Waived Daedra Charles and Kim Gessig
May 11, 1998	Signed Erin Alexander, Eugenia Rycraw and Sandra Van Embricqs
July 10, 1998	Waived Erin Alexander
July 10, 1998	Signed Michelle Reed
July 16, 1997	Fired Julie Rousseau as Head Coach
July 16, 1997	Hired Orlando Woolridge as Head Coach

== Roster ==
1998 Los Angeles Sparks roster
Players
Coaches

Pos.	No.	Nat.	Name	Height	Weight	DOB	From	Yrs
G	15	(United States)	Alexander, Erin	5' 7" (1.7m)	140 lb (64kg)	1975-04-25	UC Santa Barbara	R
F	20	(United States)	Blue, Octavia	6' 1" (1.85m)	163 lb (74kg)	1976-04-18	Miami (FL)	R
F	12	(United States)	Colleton, Katrina	5' 0" (1.52m)	145 lb (66kg)	1968-10-14	Maryland	R
G	21	(United States)	Dixon, Tamecka	5' 9" (1.75m)	148 lb (67kg)	1975-12-14	Kansas	1
F	5	(United States)	Feaster, Allison	5' 11" (1.8m)	168 lb (76kg)	1976-02-11	Harvard	R
C	9	(United States)	Leslie, Lisa	6' 5" (1.96m)	170 lb (77kg)	1972-07-07	USC	1
G	4	(Zaire)	Mabika, Mwadi	5' 11" (1.8m)	165 lb (75kg)	1976-07-27		1
F/C	30	(United States)	McGee, Pamela	6' 3" (1.91m)	180 lb (82kg)	1962-12-01	USC	1
G/F	7	(United States)	Reed, Michelle	5' 10" (1.78m)	165 lb (75kg)	1973-05-24	Western Kentucky	R
C	40	(United States)	Rycraw, Eugenia	6' 3" (1.91m)	175 lb (79kg)	1968-12-06	Cal State Fullerton	R
G	11	(United States)	Toler, Penny	5' 8" (1.73m)	132 lb (60kg)	1966-03-24	Long Beach State	1
F/C	14	(Suriname (Kingdom of the Netherlands))	Van Embricqs, Sandra	6' 3" (1.91m)	175 lb (79kg)	1968-04-18	UCLA	R
F	10	(United States)	Wideman, Jamila	5' 6" (1.68m)	135 lb (61kg)	1975-11-16	Stanford	1
C	28	(China)	Zheng, Haixia	6' 8" (2.03m)	254 lb (115kg)	1967-03-07		1

Head coach
(United States) Orlando Woolridge (Notre Dame)

Legend

- (C) Team captain
- (DP) Unsigned draft pick
- (FA) Free agent
- (S) Suspended
- Injured

== Schedule ==
=== Regular season ===
1998 game log
Total: 12–18 (Home: 8–8; Road: 4–10)
June: 2–6 (Home: 1–2; Road: 1–4)

Game	Date	Team	Score	High points	High rebounds	High assists	Location Attendance	Record
1	June 11	@ Utah	W 89–83	Lisa Leslie (24)	Lisa Leslie (12)	Penny Toler (6)	Delta Center	1–0
2	June 14	@ Phoenix	L 70–60	Lisa Leslie (18)	Lisa Leslie (10)	Katrina Colleton (4)	America West Arena	1–1
3	June 16	@ Sacramento	L 69–73	Tamecka Dixon (21)	Lisa Leslie (11)	Colleton; Dixon (3)	ARCO Arena	1–2
4	June 19	New York	W 78–75	Haixia; Leslie (19)	Lisa Leslie (21)	Penny Toler (5)	Great Western Forum	2–2
5	June 21	Houston	L 63–79	Tamecka Dixon (18)	Lisa Leslie (11)	Dixon; Toler (3)	Great Western Forum	2–3
6	June 24	Charlotte	L 73–77	Lisa Leslie (30)	Pamela McGee (7)	Jamila Wideman (4)	Great Western Forum	2–4
7	June 27	@ Houston	L 64–75	Tamecka Dixon (17)	Lisa Leslie (11)	Penny Toler (3)	Compaq Center	2–5
8	June 30	@ Sacramento	L 56–58	Lisa Leslie (21)	Lisa Leslie (8)	Jamila Wideman (4)	ARCO Arena	2–6

July: 6–7 (Home: 5–5; Road: 1–2)

Game	Date	Team	Score	High points	High rebounds	High assists	Location Attendance	Record
9	July 2	Utah	L 57–58	Lisa Leslie (15)	Lisa Leslie (10)	Dixon; Leslie; Mabika (4)	Great Western Forum	2–7
10	July 7	Charlotte	W 86–79	Lisa Leslie (24)	Lisa Leslie (7)	Mabika; Toler (5)	Great Western Forum	3–7
11	July 8	Sacramento	L 71–76	Tamecka Dixon (20)	Lisa Leslie (11)	Tamecka Dixon (4)	Great Western Forum	3–8
12	July 12	Cleveland	W 87–66	Penny Toler (22)	Lisa Leslie (11)	Penny Toler (9)	Great Western Forum	4–8
13	July 13	@ Phoenix	L 62–72	Lisa Leslie (13)	Lisa Leslie (13)	Dixon; Toler; Wideman (2)	America West Arena	4–9
14	July 15	Sacramento	W 81–76 (OT)	Tamecka Dixon (22)	Lisa Leslie (7)	Leslie; Toler (6)	Great Western Forum	5–9
15	July 17	Houston	L 68–74	Lisa Leslie (18)	Pamela McGee (9)	Penny Toler (7)	Great Western Forum	5–10
16	July 21	New York	L 77–92	Lisa Leslie (24)	Lisa Leslie (9)	Dixon; Leslie; Toler (5)	Great Western Forum	5–11
17	July 23	Phoenix	W 70–68	Tamecka Dixon (23)	Mwadi Mabika (8)	Mwadi Mabika (4)	Great Western Forum	6–11
18	July 25	@ Detroit	L 67–69	Tamecka Dixon (26)	Octavia Blue (7)	Dixon; Toler; Wideman (2)	The Palace of Auburn Hills	6–12
19	July 27	@ Cleveland	L 67–83	Mwadi Mabika (16)	Mwadi Mabika (8)	Penny Toler (6)	Gund Arena	6–13
20	July 29	@ Washington	W 77–68	Tamecka Dixon (20)	Lisa Leslie (13)	Lisa Leslie (5)	MCI Center	7–13
21	July 31	Phoenix	W 71–56	Leslie; Mabika (15)	Leslie; Mabika (8)	Penny Toler (8)	Great Western Forum	8–13

August: 4–5 (Home: 2–1; Road: 2–4)

Game	Date	Team	Score	High points	High rebounds	High assists	Location Attendance	Record
22	August 1	@ Utah	W 73–65	Lisa Leslie (24)	Lisa Leslie (9)	Penny Toler (5)	Delta Center	9–13
23	August 3	Washington	W 86–72	Lisa Leslie (21)	Mwadi Mabika (10)	Penny Toler (6)	Great Western Forum	10–13
24	August 5	@ Detroit	L 61–73	Lisa Leslie (30)	Pamela McGee (12)	Penny Toler (4)	The Palace of Auburn Hills	10–14
25	August 8	@ New York	L 62–80	Penny Toler (14)	Katrina Colleton (6)	Mwadi Mabika (3)	Madison Square Garden	10–15
26	August 9	@ Washington	L 74–76	Lisa Leslie (23)	Lisa Leslie (16)	Penny Toler (7)	MCI Center	10–16
27	August 12	@ Charlotte	W 65–52	Lisa Leslie (21)	Lisa Leslie (14)	Penny Toler (6)	Charlotte Coliseum	11–16
28	August 14	Utah	W 87–67	Lisa Leslie (18)	Lisa Leslie (14)	Penny Toler (14)	Great Western Forum	12–16
29	August 16	Detroit	L 76–77	Lisa Leslie (30)	Lisa Leslie (14)	Penny Toler (9)	Great Western Forum	12–17
30	August 19	@ Houston	L 71–80	Lisa Leslie (24)	Lisa Leslie (9)	Penny Toler (6)	Compaq Center	12–18

1998 season schedule

=== Season standings ===
Western Conference	W	L	PCT	Conf.	GB
Houston Comets ^{x}	27	3	.900	15–1	–
Phoenix Mercury ^{x}	19	11	.633	10–6	8.0
Los Angeles Sparks ^{o}	12	18	.400	6–10	15.0
Sacramento Monarchs ^{o}	8	22	.267	5–11	19.0
Utah Starzz ^{o}	8	22	.267	4–12	19.0

== Statistics ==
Legend
GP	Games played	GS	Games started	MPG	Minutes per game	RPG	Rebounds per game
APG	Assists per game	SPG	Steals per game	BPG	Blocks per game	PPG	Points per game
FG%	Field-goal percentage	3P%	3-point field-goal percentage	FT%	Free-throw percentage	TO	Turnovers per game
PF	Fouls per game		Team leader		League leader

=== Regular season ===
Player	GP	GS	MPG	FG%	3P%	FT%	RPG	APG	SPG	BPG	PPG
Tamecka Dixon	22	22	32.3	.438	.356	.779	2.5	2.5	1.1	0.4	16.2
Lisa Leslie	28	28	32.1	.478	.391	.768	10.2	2.5	1.5	2.1	19.6
Penny Toler	30	30	31.5	.415	.417	.743	3.5	4.8	1.1	0.1	12.3
Mwadi Mabika	29	23	24.5	.339	.308	.698	4.4	1.5	1.0	0.3	8.2
Katrina Colleton	30	14	19.2	.303	.263	.833	1.7	1.6	0.6	0.4	2.7
Pamela McGee	30	22	19.0	.437	.000	.614	4.8	0.4	0.8	0.8	6.8
Sandra Van Embricqs	28	2	16.8	.483	N/A	.500	2.7	0.6	0.9	0.3	3.4
Zheng Haixia	6	2	16.3	.625	N/A	.714	4.3	0.5	0.0	0.2	7.5
Allison Feaster	3	0	13.7	.214	.200	1.000	0.7	1.0	0.7	0.0	3.3
Jamila Wideman	25	0	13.2	.279	.250	.724	0.9	2.3	0.4	0.0	1.9
Eugenia Rycraw	20	4	11.3	.469	N/A	.727	2.5	0.2	0.4	0.9	2.3
Octavia Blue	30	3	11.0	.338	.286	.625	1.6	0.3	0.4	0.1	2.4
Erin Alexander	8	0	9.1	.318	.375	1.000	1.9	0.8	0.3	0.0	2.8
Michelle Reed	9	0	5.4	.273	.250	.583	1.2	0.2	0.2	0.1	1.6

^{‡}Waived/Released during the season
^{†}Traded during the season
^{≠}Acquired during the season
