= 1997 Los Angeles Sparks season =

- Head coach: Linda Sharp (fired Jul. 16, 4–7 record); Julie Rousseau (10–7 record)
- Arena: Great Western Forum

Results
- Record: 14–14 (.500)
- Place: 2nd (Western)
- Playoff finish: Did not qualify

The 1997 WNBA season was the first season for the Los Angeles Sparks. The Sparks finished in second place in the Western Division with a record of 14 wins and 14 losses.

== Transactions ==
=== WNBA allocation draft ===
Player	Nationality	School/Team/Country
Lisa Leslie	United States	USC
Penny Toler	United States	Long Beach State

=== WNBA elite draft ===
Round	Pick	Player	Nationality	School/Team/Country
1	8	Daedra Charles	United States	Tennessee
2	16	Zheng Haixia	China	China

=== WNBA draft ===
Round	Pick	Player	Nationality	School/Team/Country
1	3	Jamila Wideman	United States	Stanford
2	14	Tamecka Dixon	United States	Kansas
3	19	Katrina Colleton	United States	Maryland
4	30	Travesa Gant	United States	Lamar

=== Transactions ===
Date	Transaction
January 22, 1997	Drafted Lisa Leslie and Penny Toler in the 1997 WNBA Allocation Draft
February 27, 1997	Drafted Daedra Charles and Zheng Haixia in the 1997 WNBA Elite Draft
April 16, 1997	Hired Linda Sharp as Head Coach
April 28, 1997	Drafted Jamila Wideman, Tamecka Dixon, Katrina Colleton and Travesa Gant in the 1997 WNBA draft
July 16, 1997	Fired Linda Sharp as Head Coach
July 16, 1997	Hired Julie Rousseau as Head Coach

== Roster ==
1997 Los Angeles Sparks roster
Players
Coaches

Pos.	No.	Nat.	Name	Height	Weight	DOB	From	Yrs
F/C	34	(United States)	Burge, Heidi	6' 5" (1.96m)	185 lb (84kg)	1971-11-12	Virginia	R
F	42	(United States)	Burgess, Linda	6' 1" (1.85m)	173 lb (78kg)	1967-07-27	Alabama	R
F/C	32	(United States)	Charles, Daedra	6' 3" (1.91m)	225 lb (102kg)	1968-11-22	Tennessee	R
F	12	(United States)	Colleton, Katrina	5' 0" (1.52m)	145 lb (66kg)	1968-10-14	Maryland	R
G	21	(United States)	Dixon, Tamecka	5' 9" (1.75m)	148 lb (67kg)	1975-12-14	Kansas	R
C	34	(United States)	Gant, Travesa			1971-10-10	Lamar	R
F	43	(United States)	Gessig, Kim	6' 3" (1.91m)		1970-12-29	USC	R
C	9	(United States)	Leslie, Lisa	6' 5" (1.96m)	170 lb (77kg)	1972-07-07	USC	R
G	4	(Zaire)	Mabika, Mwadi	5' 11" (1.8m)	165 lb (75kg)	1976-07-27		R
G	11	(United States)	Toler, Penny	5' 8" (1.73m)	132 lb (60kg)	1966-03-24	Long Beach State	R
F	10	(United States)	Wideman, Jamila	5' 6" (1.68m)	135 lb (61kg)	1975-11-16	Stanford	R
C	28	(China)	Zheng, Haixia	6' 8" (2.03m)	254 lb (115kg)	1967-03-07		R

Head coach
(United States) Julie Rousseau (UC Irvine)

Legend

- (C) Team captain
- (DP) Unsigned draft pick
- (FA) Free agent
- (S) Suspended
- Injured

== Schedule ==
=== Regular season ===
1997 game log
Total: 14–14 (Home: 8–6; Road: 6–8)
June: 2–3 (Home: 2–1; Road: 0–2)

Game	Date	Team	Score	High points	High rebounds	High assists	Location Attendance	Record
1	June 21	New York	L 57–67	Lisa Leslie (16)	Lisa Leslie (14)	Jamila Wideman (6)	Great Western Forum	0–1
2	June 23	@ Utah	L 89–102	Lisa Leslie (22)	Lisa Leslie (10)	Jamila Wideman (7)	Delta Center	0–2
3	June 25	Charlotte	W 74–54	Lisa Leslie (19)	Leslie; Toler (5)	Penny Toler (7)	Great Western Forum	1–2
4	June 27	Sacramento	W 102–92	Zheng Haixia (28)	Zheng Haixia (10)	Toler; Wideman (7)	Great Western Forum	2–2
5	June 30	@ Houston	L 66–71 (OT)	Lisa Leslie (21)	Lisa Leslie (16)	Penny Toler (5)	The Summit	2–3

July : 6–7 (Home: 3–3; Road: 3–4)

Game	Date	Team	Score	High points	High rebounds	High assists	Location Attendance	Record
6	July 2	@ Cleveland	W 74–62	Lisa Leslie (19)	Lisa Leslie (7)	Jamila Wideman (6)	Gund Arena	3–3
7	July 5	@ Charlotte	L 66–78	Lisa Leslie (16)	Leslie; Toler (7)	Jamila Wideman (6)	Charlotte Coliseum	3–4
8	July 7	Cleveland	L 70–81	Lisa Leslie (22)	Lisa Leslie (9)	Jamila Wideman (8)	Great Western Forum	3–5
9	July 11	Utah	W 75–68	Linda Burgess (20)	Burge; Burgess (9)	Leslie; Toler (6)	Great Western Forum	4–5
10	July 13	Phoenix	L 56–57	Linda Burgess (12)	Heidi Burge (11)	Burge; Charles; Colleton; Dixon; Toler (2)	Great Western Forum	4–6
11	July 15	@ Sacramento	L 73–78	Lisa Leslie (17)	Burgess; Leslie (5)	Penny Toler (10)	ARCO Arena	4–7
12	July 16	Houston	W 77–52	Zheng Haixia (15)	Lisa Leslie (10)	Lisa Leslie (5)	Great Western Forum	5–7
13	July 19	@ New York	L 57–69	Penny Toler (14)	Lisa Leslie (7)	Jamila Wideman (4)	Madison Square Garden	5–8
14	July 21	@ Charlotte	L 64–75	Lisa Leslie (18)	Penny Toler (8)	Leslie; Toler (4)	Charlotte Coliseum	5–9
15	July 23	Cleveland	L 85–89	Lisa Leslie (28)	Lisa Leslie (13)	Jamila Wideman (7)	Great Western Forum	5–10
16	July 25	@ Phoenix	W 86–83	Lisa Leslie (17)	Lisa Leslie (8)	Toler; Wideman (4)	America West Arena	6–10
17	July 27	@ Sacramento	W 84–62	Tamecka Dixon (20)	Lisa Leslie (9)	Penny Toler (9)	ARCO Arena	7–10
18	July 30	Utah	W 91–69	Lisa Leslie (23)	Lisa Leslie (11)	Lisa Leslie (7)	Great Western Forum	8–10

August : 6–4 (Home: 3–2; Road: 3–2)

Game	Date	Team	Score	High points	High rebounds	High assists	Location Attendance	Record
19	August 1	Houston	L 57–81	Penny Toler (17)	Lisa Leslie (6)	Penny Toler (3)	Great Western Forum	8–11
20	August 3	Charlotte	L 70–77	Penny Toler (19)	Lisa Leslie (10)	Penny Toler (7)	Great Western Forum	8–12
21	August 5	@ New York	W 67–50	Dixon; Toler (16)	Lisa Leslie (14)	Penny Toler (3)	Madison Square Garden	9–12
22	August 7	@ Cleveland	W 87–84	Tamecka Dixon (23)	Lisa Leslie (14)	Lisa Leslie (5)	Gund Arena	10–12
23	August 9	@ Houston	L 71–72	Tamecka Dixon (21)	Zheng Haixia (7)	Penny Toler (4)	The Summit	10–13
24	August 16	@ Utah	W 74–64	Lisa Leslie (23)	Lisa Leslie (12)	Penny Toler (8)	Delta Center	11–13
25	August 18	Phoenix	W 75–66	Lisa Leslie (26)	Lisa Leslie (15)	Penny Toler (8)	Great Western Forum	12–13
26	August 20	New York	W 78–76	Penny Toler (17)	Zheng Haixia (9)	Penny Toler (6)	Great Western Forum	13–13
27	August 22	Sacramento	W 88–77	Zheng Haixia (21)	Lisa Leslie (12)	Penny Toler (8)	Great Western Forum	14–13
28	August 24	@ Phoenix	L 68–73	Tamecka Dixon (25)	Lisa Leslie (14)	Penny Toler (4)	America West Arena	14–14

1997 season schedule

=== Season standings ===
Western Conference	W	L	PCT	Conf.	GB
Phoenix Mercury ^{x}	16	12	.571	9–3	–
Los Angeles Sparks ^{o}	14	14	.500	8–4	2.0
Sacramento Monarchs ^{o}	10	18	.357	4–8	6.0
Utah Starzz ^{o}	7	21	.250	3–9	9.0

== Statistics ==
Legend
GP	Games played	GS	Games started	MPG	Minutes per game	RPG	Rebounds per game
APG	Assists per game	SPG	Steals per game	BPG	Blocks per game	PPG	Points per game
FG%	Field-goal percentage	3P%	3-point field-goal percentage	FT%	Free-throw percentage	TO	Turnovers per game
PF	Fouls per game		Team leader		League leader

=== Regular season ===
Player	GP	GS	MPG	FG%	3P%	FT%	RPG	APG	SPG	BPG	PPG
Penny Toler	28	28	32.4	.426	.184	.839	3.4	5.1	1.3	0.1	13.1
Lisa Leslie	28	28	32.2	.431	.261	.598	9.5	2.6	1.4	2.1	15.9
Tamecka Dixon	27	21	26.5	.456	.423	.773	3.0	2.0	1.8	0.2	11.9
Jamila Wideman	28	14	22.6	.236	.194	.794	2.0	3.7	0.9	0.0	3.0
Katrina Colleton	28	14	21.9	.437	.360	.567	2.1	1.6	1.3	0.3	4.9
Zheng Haixia	28	21	19.9	.618	N/A	.661	4.4	0.6	0.4	0.7	9.3
Linda Burgess	28	6	17.6	.541	.500	.735	4.2	0.3	0.7	0.5	6.5
Mwadi Mabika	21	1	15.5	.390	.184	.542	2.6	1.0	1.1	0.3	6.0
Heidi Burge	22	6	12.8	.444	.000	.511	3.1	0.7	0.5	0.5	4.0
Daedra Charles	28	1	10.1	.403	.000	.667	1.7	0.4	0.4	0.4	2.3
Travesa Gant	2	0	6.5	.000	N/A	N/A	1.5	0.0	0.0	0.0	0.0
Kim Gessig	1	0	4.0	N/A	N/A	N/A	1.0	0.0	0.0	0.0	0.0

^{‡}Waived/Released during the season
^{†}Traded during the season
^{≠}Acquired during the season

- Tamecka Dixon was tied for tenth in the WNBA in steals with 49.
- Tamecka Dixon ranked tenth in the WNBA in Field Goal Percentage (.456)
- Lisa Leslie ranked third in the WNBA in points with 445 points.
- Lisa Leslie ranked third in the WNBA in points per game with 15.9
- Lisa Leslie ranked fifth in the WNBA in field goals with 160.
- Lisa Leslie ranked first in the WNBA in total rebounds with 266.
- Lisa Leslie ranked second in the WNBA in blocks with 59.
- Penny Toler ranked tenth in the WNBA in points with 368 points.
- Penny Toler ranked eighth in the WNBA in field goals with 144.
- Penny Toler ranked tenth in the WNBA in points per game with 13.1
- Penny Toler ranked sixth in the WNBA in Free Throw Pct with .839
- Penny Toler ranked second in the WNBA in assists with 143.
- Jamila Wideman ranked seventh in the WNBA in assists with 103.
- Haixia Zheng ranked ninth in the WNBA in blocks with 20.

== Awards and honors ==
- Lisa Leslie, Center, All WNBA First Team
- Lisa Leslie: Led WNBA, Defensive Rebounds, 203
- Lisa Leslie: Led WNBA, Total Rebounds, 266
- Lisa Leslie: Led WNBA, Rebounds per game, 9.5
- Lisa Leslie ranked second in the WNBA with 2.1 blocks per game.
- Lisa Leslie ranked third in the WNBA with 113 Free Throws.
- Haixia Zheng, WNBA Peak Performer
- Haixia Zheng, Kim Perrot Sportsmanship Award
- Haixia Zheng: Led WNBA, Field Goal Percentage, .618
