= Sandra Van Embricqs =

Dutch basketball player (born 1968)

Personal information
- Born: April 14, 1968 (age 58) Paramaribo, Suriname
- Listed height: 1.88 m (6 ft 2 in)

Career information
- College: UCLA (1986–1990)
- Playing career: 1985–2002
- Position: Power forward / center
- Number: 14

Career history
- 1985-1986: Sportlife Canadians
- 1990–1992: Manresa
- 1992–1994: Texim Tonego
- 1994–1995: Namur-Capitale
- 1995–1997: Soubry Kortrijk
- 1997–1998: Bourges
- 1998: Los Angeles Sparks
- 1999–2001: Lachen Ramat-Hasharon
- 2001–2002: ProBuild Lions

Career highlights
- 2x All Pac-10 Team (1989, 1990)
- Stats at Basketball Reference

Sandra Van Embricqs (born April 14, 1968) is a Surinamese former professional basketball player. Standing at 1.88 m (6 ft 2 in), she played as power forward or center. She played in the Women's National Basketball Association (WNBA) for the Los Angeles Sparks in 1998.

== Post-playing career ==
Following her professional career, Van Embricqs was hired as a French teacher and named the girls basketball coach at Chino High School in Chino, California in 2010.

== Personal life ==
Van Embricqs' daughter, Arelle Middleton, is a Paralympic athlete who competed at the 2024 Summer Paralympics.

== Career statistics ==
Legend
GP	Games played	GS	Games started	MPG	Minutes per game	RPG	Rebounds per game
APG	Assists per game	SPG	Steals per game	BPG	Blocks per game	PPG	Points per game
TO	Turnovers per game	FG%	Field-goal percentage	3P%	3-point field-goal percentage	FT%	Free-throw percentage
**Bold**	Career best	°	League leader

=== WNBA ===
Year	Team	GP	GS	MPG	FG%	3P%	FT%	RPG	APG	SPG	BPG	TO	PPG
1998	Los Angeles	28	2	16.8	.483	–	.500	2.7	.6	.9	.3	.7	3.4
