= Zheng Haixia =

Chinese basketball player (born 1967)

Personal information
- Born: March 7, 1967 (age 59) Shangqiu, Henan, China
- Listed height: 6 ft 8 in (2.03 m)
- Listed weight: 254 lb (115 kg)

Career information
- WNBA draft: 1997: 2nd round, 16th overall pick
- Drafted by: Los Angeles Sparks
- Playing career: 1983–1998
- Position: Center

Career history
- 1997–1998: Los Angeles Sparks
- Stats at Basketball Reference
- FIBA Hall of Fame
Medals
Women's basketball
Representing China
Olympic Games
Silver medal – second place	1992 Barcelona	Team competition
Bronze medal – third place	1984 Los Angeles	Team competition
FIBA World Championship
Silver medal – second place	1994 Australia	Team competition
Bronze medal – third place	1983 Brazil	Team competition
Asian Games
Gold medal – first place	1986 Seoul	Team competition
Silver medal – second place	1990 Beijing	Team competition
Bronze medal – third place	1994 Hiroshima	Team competition

Zheng Haixia (Chinese: 郑海霞; pinyin: Zhèng Hǎixiá; born March 7, 1967) is a Chinese retired professional women's basketball player for the China women's national basketball team and the Women's National Basketball Association.

== International career ==
In 1983, Haixia made her debut at the Basketball World Championship and finished 3rd. The following year, she and her teammates finished 1st in the Asian Junior Basketball Championship and 3rd in the 23rd Olympic Games.

In 1986, she led the Chinese team to fifth in the 10th World Championship, 1st in the Asian Games, and 2nd in the World Championship.

In 1992, she inspired her teammates to win the silver in the Barcelona Olympics. The following year, she won the East Asian Games, the World University Games and National Games.

In 1994, she claimed the titles in the Asian Championship and ranked 2nd in the World Championship, being named MVP of the event by averaging 26.4 points, 13.1 rebounds and shooting 83.5% from the field.

One year later, she and her teammates retained their title in the 16th Asian Championship.

In 1996, she made her fourth Olympic appearance in Atlanta, Georgia, averaging 18.1 points, 9 rebounds. One year later, she won the 8th National Games with the PLA team.

== WNBA career ==
In 1997 she retired from the Chinese national team and went to play with the Los Angeles Sparks in the WNBA in the United States after being selected by the Sparks with the final pick of the WNBA Elite Draft. Her WNBA debut was played on June 21, 1997, in a 57 - 67 loss to the New York Liberty where she recorded 8 points and 5 rebounds. She played with the Sparks for the 1997 and 1998 seasons, with her final WNBA game ever being played on June 24, 1998, against the Charlotte Sting. The Sparks lost the game 73 - 77 with Haixia playing three and half minutes and recorded only 1 rebound as a statistic.

At the end of 1998, she returned to China and began to coach the PLA women's team. She is currently a coach in China.

In 1997 Haixia received the Kim Perrot Sportsmanship Award becoming the first Asian woman as well as international player to win any award in the WNBA. She led the WNBA in field goal percentage at 61.8%.

== Career statistics ==
Legend
GP	Games played	GS	Games started	MPG	Minutes per game	RPG	Rebounds per game
APG	Assists per game	SPG	Steals per game	BPG	Blocks per game	PPG	Points per game
TO	Turnovers per game	FG%	Field-goal percentage	3P%	3-point field-goal percentage	FT%	Free-throw percentage
**Bold**	Career best	°	League leader

Year	Team	GP	GS	MPG	FG%	3P%	FT%	RPG	APG	SPG	BPG	TO	PPG
1997	Los Angeles	**28**	**21**	**19.9**	.618	—	.661	**4.4**	**0.6**	**0.4**	**0.7**	1.6	**9.3**
1998	Los Angeles	6	2	16.3	**.625**	—	**.714**	4.3	0.5	0.0	0.2	**1.0**	7.5
Career	2 years, 1 team	34	23	19.3	.619	—	.667	4.4	0.6	0.3	0.6	1.5	8.9

== Personal life ==
She started to practice basketball at the age of 12 and was selected by the Wuhan Army club team one year later. In 1983, she entered the national team. She married Xu Qinghua in Beijing on June 19, 2010.
