= WNBA elite draft =

Basketball draft

General information
- Sport: Basketball
- Date: February 27, 1997

Overview
- League: WNBA
- First selection: Dena Head, Tennessee

In 1997 the Women's National Basketball Association was created. To give new teams experienced talent, the league decided to have two drafts. An elite draft was held on February 27, 1997, to allow teams to pick players that had already graduated from college and have gone on to play professionally in the United States or overseas.

The standard collegiate draft that most professional sports leagues hold occurred on April 28, 1997, prior to the start of the 1997 WNBA season.

== Key ==
Pos.	G	F	C
Position	Guard	Forward	Center

!	Denotes player who has been inducted to the Naismith Basketball Hall of Fame
^	Denotes player who has been inducted to the Women's Basketball Hall of Fame
*	Denotes player who has been selected for at least one All-Star Game and All-WNBA Team
^{+}	Denotes player who has been selected for at least one All-Star Game
^{#}	Denotes player who never played in the WNBA regular season or playoffs

== Draft ==
The following is the list of how players were picked in the 1997 WNBA elite draft:

=== Round 1 ===
Pick	Player	Position	Nationality	WNBA team	Former school/club team
1	Dena Head	G	United States	Utah Starzz	Tennessee
2	Isabelle Fijalkowski	C/F	France	Cleveland Rockers	Colorado
3	Rhonda Mapp	C/F	United States	Charlotte Sting	North Carolina State
4	Kym Hampton ^{+}	C/F	United States	New York Liberty	Arizona State
5	Wanda Guyton	F	United States	Houston Comets	South Florida
6	Judy Mosley-McAfee	F	United States	Sacramento Monarchs	Hawaii
7	Bridget Pettis	F	United States	Phoenix Mercury	Florida
8	Daedra Charles ^	C	United States	Los Angeles Sparks	Tennessee

=== Round 2 ===
Pick	Player	Position	Nationality	WNBA team	Former school/club team
9	Wendy Palmer *	F	United States	Utah Starzz	Virginia
10	Lynette Woodard ^ !	G	United States	Cleveland Rockers	Kansas
11	Michi Atkins ^{#}	F	United States	Charlotte Sting	Texas Tech
12	Vickie Johnson ^{+}	F	United States	New York Liberty	Louisiana Tech
13	Janeth Arcain * ^	F	Brazil	Houston Comets	Polti
14	Mikiko Hagiwara	G	Japan	Sacramento Monarchs	Japan Energy Griffins
15	Nancy Lieberman-Cline	G	United States	Phoenix Mercury	Old Dominion
16	Haixia Zheng	C	China	Los Angeles Sparks	China
