= 1989 Big West Conference women's basketball tournament =

- Classification: Division I
- Teams: 9
- Site: Long Beach Arena; Long Beach, California
- First round site: Gold Mine; Long Beach, California
- Champions: Long Beach State (3rd title)
- Winning coach: Joan Bonvicini (3rd title)
- MVP: Penny Toler (Long Beach State)

1988–89 Big West Conference women's basketball standings
	Conf.				Overall
Team	W		L	PCT	W		L	PCT
No. 7 Long Beach State †	18	–	0	1.000	30	–	5	.857
No. 16 UNLV	13	–	5	.722	27	–	7	.794
Hawaii	13	–	5	.722	18	–	10	.643
San Diego State	12	–	6	.667	25	–	9	.735
Cal State Fullerton	12	–	6	.667	21	–	9	.700
Fresno State	9	–	9	.500	18	–	12	.600
UC Santa Barbara	4	–	14	.222	9	–	19	.321
UC Irvine	4	–	14	.222	9	–	20	.310
Pacific	4	–	14	.222	6	–	22	.214
San Jose State	1	–	17	.056	4	–	23	.148
† 1989 Big West tournament winner Rankings from AP Poll

The 1989 Big West Conference women's basketball tournament took place March 7–10, 1989. A play-in game was hosted at the Gold Mine on the Long Beach State campus, while the remaining games were held at the Long Beach Arena in Long Beach, California. Long Beach State won their third straight tournament title and received the conference's automatic bid to the 1989 NCAA Women's Division I Basketball Tournament.

== Format ==
The top nine teams, out of ten, from the regular season standings qualified for the tournament.

The eight and nine seeds faced off in a play-in game. The remaining top seven teams were placed into the first round, with teams seeded and paired based on regular-season records.

== Bracket ==
Play-in; Wednesday, March 7
8	UC Irvine	60
9	Pacific	49

Quarterfinals; Thursday, March 8
1	Long Beach State	91
8	UC Irvine	59
4	Cal State Fullerton	68
5	San Diego State	60
3	Hawaii	71
6	Fresno State	64
2	UNLV	86
7	UC Santa Barbara	50

Semifinals; Friday, March 9
1	Long Beach State	81
4	Cal State Fullerton	61
3	Hawaii	65
2	UNLV	78

Championship game Saturday, March 10
1	Long Beach State	89
2	UNLV	81

== All-Tournament Team ==
- Shameil Coleman, Long Beach State
- Pauline Jordan, UNLV
- Genia Miller, Cal State Fullerton
- Judy Mosley, Hawaii
- Penny Toler, Long Beach State (MVP)
- Traci Waites, Long Beach State
