= Jamila Wideman =

American lawyer, activist, and former professional basketball player

Personal information
- Born: October 16, 1975 (age 50)
- Education: Stanford University (BA); New York University (JD)
- Years active: 1997–2000

Sport
- Sport: Basketball
- Position: Point guard
- Team: Los Angeles Sparks (1997–98); Cleveland Rockers (1999); Portland Fire (1999-2001); Elitzur Ramla (1999–2000); Connecticut Sun (2004); PDV Ibiza (2005)

Jamila Wideman (born October 16, 1975) is an American lawyer, activist, and former professional basketball player. She is the daughter of author John Edgar Wideman. She was most recently the general manager of the WNBA team, Washington Mystics.

== Early life ==
Wideman was born on October 16, 1975. Her father, John Edgar Wideman, is an African-American author and a professor at Brown University. Her mother, Judith Ann Goldman, is a lawyer.

Until she was 10 years old, Wideman lived in Laramie, Wyoming, where her father taught Creative Writing at the University of Wyoming. In 1986, she moved to Amherst, Massachusetts, where her father accepted a tenured teaching position at the University of Massachusetts.

== Education ==
=== High school ===
Wideman started on the Amherst Regional High School Varsity team for six straight years, beginning in 7th grade.

In her senior year, leading her team to the high school state championship, Wideman averaged 17 points, 6 steals, 6 assists, and 6 rebounds per game. In the State Championship game, she scored 27 points, had 14 steals and 8 assists, with 7 rebounds.

In 1992–1993, Wideman was named USA Today First Team High School All-American, Converse High School All-American, Nike High School All-American, Kodak High School All-American, New England High School Player of the Year, Massachusetts High School Player of the Year, and High School All-American by the WBCA. She participated in the WBCA High School All-America Game in 1993, scoring 10 points.

Her high school basketball team was the subject of a book, In These Girls Hope is a Muscle, by Madeleine Blais. While in high school, Wideman published poems on the complexities of her racial identity in her high school newspaper. Shortly after the Los Angeles uprisings of 1992, she wrote and published a poem titled Black.

=== College ===
Wideman attended Stanford University, where she continued with basketball. As a 5'6" point guard, Wideman was the smallest player on her college team.

While at Stanford University, she completed a double major, earning a B.A. in political science and African-American studies in 1997. After playing professional basketball, she earned a J.D. from New York University School of Law.

== Professional basketball career ==
Wideman was selected as the 3rd overall draft pick by the Los Angeles Sparks in the inaugural WNBA draft of collegiate players in the summer of 1997. Her debut game was played on June 21, 1997 in a 57 - 67 loss to the New York Liberty. Wideman recorded 4 points, 5 rebounds, 6 assists and 2 steals in her debut game.

Wideman would be traded from the Sparks to the Cleveland Rockers on June 21, 1999 and played 26 games for the team, averaging 2.2 points and 2 assists. After the 1999 season, Wideman was selected by the Portland Fire in the expansion draft that took place on December 15, 1999. She would only play 5 games with the newly found WNBA franchise, but will not score in any of those games (playing a total of 35 minutes across all 5 appearances). Wideman was waived by the Fire on April 24, 2001, before the start of the next WNBA season.

Wideman spent the 1999–2000 winter season in Israel, playing for the Elitzur Ramla club in the Israeli Basketball League. Her team won the national championship.

Three years after being waived by the Portland Fire and not playing in the WNBA, Wideman would try a comeback on April 19, 2004 by signing a contract with the Connecticut Sun. Unfortunately she would be cut two weeks later on May 4, 2004 before ever playing a game for the Sun and she never attempted a WNBA comeback afterwards. Thus, Wideman's final WNBA game ever was the 5th game she played with the Portland Fire during the 2000 season. That game was played on August 9, 2000 and the Fire would lose 60 - 68 to the Phoenix Mercury. Wideman only played for three and half minutes in her final game and grabbed one rebound and dished out one assist.

During the winter of 2005, Wideman reunited with college teammate Kate Starbird and played professionally in Ibiza, Spain.

== Activism ==
Upon graduation from Stanford, and during the off-seasons of the WNBA, Wideman founded and directed the Stanford Athletic Alliance. In 1997, Wideman founded and implemented another youth program called "Hoopin' with Jamila". The program was funded by Nike. USA Today honored Wideman as the "Most Caring Athlete" in 1998. The program also earned the National Council on Crime and Delinquency "Community Award", given annually to programs that attempt to provide creative alternatives to juvenile incarceration.

In 2001, Wideman participated in the Connecticut Forum, where she shared the stage with Stanley Crouch, Anita Hill, Spike Lee, and Bill Russell to talk candidly about race.

== Writing ==
Wideman collaborated with Juniper Lesnik to publish an article on playground basketball in the Sunday New York Times.

== Post-basketball accomplishments ==
Following her graduation from New York University Law School, Wideman began working as a staff attorney at Equal Justice Initiative (EJI) in Montgomery, Alabama, where she litigated on behalf of death sentences individuals in state and federal courts, and later became a staff attorney at the Legal Aid Society in New York City.

In September 2018, Wideman was hired by the NBA as Vice President of Player Development.

In December 2024, Wideman was announced as the general manager of Washington Mystics on WNBA. On April 6, 2026, the Washington Mystics fired Wideman after one season.

== Career statistics ==
Legend
GP	Games played	GS	Games started	MPG	Minutes per game	RPG	Rebounds per game
APG	Assists per game	SPG	Steals per game	BPG	Blocks per game	PPG	Points per game
TO	Turnovers per game	FG%	Field-goal percentage	3P%	3-point field-goal percentage	FT%	Free-throw percentage
**Bold**	Career best	°	League leader

=== WNBA Career Statistics ===
==== Regular season ====
Year	Team	GP	GS	MPG	FG%	3P%	FT%	RPG	APG	SPG	BPG	TO	PPG
1997	Los Angeles	**28**	**14**	**22.6**	.236	.194	**.794**	**2.0**	**3.7**	**0.9**	0.0	1.8	**3.0**
1998	Los Angeles	25	0	13.2	**.279**	**.250**	.724	0.9	2.3	0.4	0.0	1.4	1.9
1999	Cleveland	26	13	15.4	.273	.136	.647	1.3	2.0	0.8	0.0	1.5	2.2
2000	Portland	5	0	7.0	.000	—	—	0.8	0.4	0.4	0.0	**1.2**	0.0
Career	4 years, 3 teams	84	27	16.6	.254	.186	.738	1.4	2.5	0.7	0.0	1.6	2.2

=== College ===
Year	Team	GP	GS	MPG	FG%	3P%	FT%	RPG	APG	SPG	BPG	TO	PPG
1993–94	Stanford	30	-	-	40.4	33.3	71.2	2.9	4.5	1.6	0.0	-	6.1
1994–95	Stanford	32	-	-	36.9	15.8	66.7	1.9	3.5	1.3	0.0	-	3.7
1995–96	Stanford	30	-	-	**43.5**	23.3	**72.8**	**4.3**	2.2	**2.8**	0.0	-	**9.3**
1996–97	Stanford	**35**	-	-	41.6	**37.5**	72.2	3.1	**5.0**	2.3	0.0	-	8.6
**Career**		127	-	-	41.2	29.0	71.4	3.0	3.8	2.0	0.0	-	7.0
Statistics retrieved from Sports-Reference.

== See also ==
- List of select Jewish basketball players
