= Julie Rousseau =

American basketball coach

Personal information
- Born: Los Angeles, California, U.S.

Career history

Coaching
- 1997–98: Los Angeles Sparks (Assistant, interim and head coach)
- 2000–04: Stanford Cardinal (Assistant)
- 2004–13: Pepperdine Waves (Head)
- 2014–15: Nevada Wolf Pack (Assistant)

Julie Rousseau (born 1964 or 1965) was the head coach of the WNBA team Los Angeles Sparks from 1997 to 1998. Outside of the WNBA, Rousseau was a coach of multiple NCAA teams including the Stanford Cardinal and Pepperdine Waves. She also was an assistant coach for the gold winning United States women's national basketball team during the 2009 Summer Universiade.

== Early life and education ==
Rousseau was born in the mid-1960s and lived with four siblings. She moved from Inglewood, California to Los Angeles for her high school education. Leading up to the early 1980s, Rousseau played basketball at Dorsey High School and the University of California, Irvine. Rousseau graduated from the California State University, Los Angeles with a Bachelor of Education in 1991, a Master of Psychology from Pepperdine University in 2012. and a PhD in Human Systems Engineering from Arizona State University in 2019

== Career ==
Rousseau began her coaching career at George Washington Preparatory High School. She was the head coach of the girls basketball team for George Washington Prep from 1992 to 1997. Afterwards, she briefly coached in the WNBA starting as an assistant coach for the Los Angeles Sparks in 1997. She later became the Sparks's interim head coach and named head coach at the end of 1997. Rousseau held her position of head coach of the Sparks until the summer of 1998. With the Sparks, Rousseau had 17 wins and 20 losses.

After leaving the WNBA, Rousseau began working in the NCAA. Rousseau was the assistant coach for the Stanford Cardinal women's basketball from 2000 to 2004. Upon leaving the Cardinal, Rousseau was the head coach of the Pepperdine Waves women's basketball team from 2004 to 2013. With the Waves, she had 123 wins and 144 losses.

After leaving the Waves, she worked as a sports commentator for Pac-12 Network before becoming an assistant coach for the Nevada Wolf Pack women's basketball team in July 2014. Rousseau remained with the Wolf Pack until May 2015 to pursue further post-secondary education. Outside of the NCAA, Rousseau was an assistant coach of the United States women's national basketball team that won gold at the 2009 Summer Universiade.

== Head coaching record ==
Legend
Regular season	G	Games coached	W	Games won	L	Games lost	W–L %	Win–loss %
Playoffs	PG	Playoff games	PW	Playoff wins	PL	Playoff losses	PW–L %	Playoff win–loss %

Team	Year	G	W	L	W–L%	Finish	PG	PW	PL	PW–L%	Result
Los Angeles	1997	17	10	7	.588	2nd in Western	—	—	—	—	Missed playoffs
Los Angeles	1998	20	7	13	.350	(replaced)	—	—	—	—	—
Career		37	17	20	.459		—	—	—	—	
