= Linda Burgess =

American basketball player (born 1969)

Personal information
- Born: July 27, 1969 (age 57) Madison, Alabama, U.S.
- Listed height: 6 ft 1 in (1.85 m)
- Listed weight: 173 lb (78 kg)

Career information
- High school: Bob Jones (Madison, Alabama)
- College: Calhoun CC (1988–1990); Alabama (1990–1992)
- Playing career: 1992–2000
- Position: Forward
- Number: 42

Career history
- 1997: Los Angeles Sparks
- 1998–2000: Sacramento Monarchs

Career highlights
- 2× First-team All-SEC (1991, 1992)
- Stats at WNBA.com
- Stats at Basketball Reference

Linda Gail Burgess (born July 27, 1969) is an American former professional basketball player. She played college basketball for the Alabama Crimson Tide and professionally in the Women's National Basketball Association (WNBA) for the Los Angeles Sparks and Sacramento Monarchs.

== Early life ==
Burgess was born July 27, 1969 in Madison, Alabama. She attended Bob Jones High School in Madison, where she played on the school's basketball, volleyball, and softball teams. She was a basketball all-state selection as a senior, averaging over 30 points and 20 rebounds per game in her last year of high school.

== College career ==
After high school, Burgess first played college basketball at Calhoun Community College, where she was a two-time All-American. After her sophomore year, she transferred to play for the Alabama Crimson Tide. She was selected first-team All-SEC in both her junior and senior years at Alabama. She averaged 20 points per game in her senior season with the Crimson Tide.

== Professional career ==
Burgess played professional basketball in Switzerland and Israel after college before returning to the United States and playing in the Women's National Basketball Association (WNBA) for four years. She spent the 1997 WNBA season with the Los Angeles Sparks and the 1998–2000 seasons with the Sacramento Monarchs after the Sparks traded her to the Monarchs in exchange for Pam McGee. She averaged 5.8 points and 3.7 rebounds per game in 90 career WNBA games.

Burgess was inducted into the Huntsville-Madison County Athletic Hall of Fame in 2019.

== Career statistics ==
Legend
GP	Games played	GS	Games started	MPG	Minutes per game	RPG	Rebounds per game
APG	Assists per game	SPG	Steals per game	BPG	Blocks per game	PPG	Points per game
TO	Turnovers per game	FG%	Field-goal percentage	3P%	3-point field-goal percentage	FT%	Free-throw percentage
**Bold**	Career best	°	League leader

=== WNBA ===
==== Regular season ====
WNBA regular season statistics
Year	Team	GP	GS	MPG	FG%	3P%	FT%	RPG	APG	SPG	BPG	TO	PPG
1997	Los Angeles	28	6	17.6	**.541**	**.500**	.735	4.2	0.3	0.7	**0.5**	1.7	6.5
1998	Sacramento	**30**	**29**	**23.1**	.476	.125	**.763**	**4.9**	**0.9**	**1.4**	0.4	2.0	**7.5**
1999	Sacramento	27	0	8.6	.434	.000	.756	2.0	0.1	0.2	0.1	**0.7**	3.6
2000	Sacramento	5	0	8.2	.200	—	.667	3.4	0.4	0.2	0.0	0.8	2.4
**Career**	4 years, 2 teams	90	35	16.2	.480	.182	.747	3.7	0.5	0.8	0.3	1.5	5.8

==== Playoffs ====
WNBA playoff statistics
Year	Team	GP	GS	MPG	FG%	3P%	FT%	RPG	APG	SPG	BPG	TO	PPG
1999	Sacramento	**1**	0	**14.0**	.500	.000	**1.000**	**4.0**	0.0	**2.0**	0.0	2.0	**8.0**
2000	Sacramento	**1**	0	8.0	**1.000**	—	**1.000**	2.0	0.0	0.0	**2.0**	**1.0**	4.0
**Career**	2 years, 1 team	2	0	11.0	.571	.000	1.000	3.0	0.0	1.0	1.0	1.5	6.0

=== College ===
College statistics
Year	Team	GP	GS	MPG	FG%	3P%	FT%	RPG	APG	SPG	BPG	TO	PPG
1990–91	Alabama	29			.520	—	.649	7.9	**1.0**	**1.6**	0.7		15.8
1991–92	Alabama	**30**			**.568**	—	**.568**	**8.2**	0.5	**1.6**	**0.9**		**20.3**
**Career**		59			.546	—	.641	8.1	0.7	1.6	0.8		18.1

== Post-basketball career ==
After retiring from professional basketball, Burgess began a career as a teacher. She taught at the Georgia Academy for the Blind and Central High School, both in Macon, Georgia. In 2022, she began coaching girls' basketball at Twiggs County High School in Jeffersonville, Georgia. By 2023, she was the school's director of athletics.

== Personal life ==
Burgess is Christian. She has four siblings, including an older sister who played college basketball for the Alabama A&M Lady Bulldogs.
