= 2008 WNBA dispersal draft =

General information
- Sport: Basketball
- Date: December 8, 2008

Overview
- League: WNBA
- Merging teams: Houston Comets (folded in 2008)
- First selection: Sancho Lyttle; Atlanta Dream

The Women's National Basketball Association (WNBA) held their fourth dispersal draft on December 8, 2008.

On December 1, 2008, the league announced that the Houston Comets would no longer be in operation. The dispersal draft was held on December 8 to reassign players from the 2008 Comets roster. The remaining thirteen teams in the WNBA each selected one player from the team's final roster in the one-round draft. Teams drafted in inverse order of their 2008 regular season finish. All Comets players were available except for unrestricted free agents, Latasha Byears, Mwadi Mabika, Hamchetou Maiga-Ba, Michelle Snow, and Tina Thompson.

Lucienne Berthieu, Tamecka Dixon, Shannon Johnson, and Polina Tzekova were not selected in the draft and became free agents on January 5, 2009.

== Key ==
Pos.	G	F	C
Position	Guard	Forward	Center

^{+}	Denotes player who has been selected for at least one All-Star Game

== Draft ==
The following players were drafted from the roster of the Houston Comets:

Pick	Player	Position	Nationality	New team
1	Sancho Lyttle ^{+}	F/C	Saint Vincent and the Grenadines	Atlanta Dream
2	Matee Ajavon	G	United States	Washington Mystics
3	Mistie Williams	F	United States	Chicago Sky
4	Roneeka Hodges	G	United States	Minnesota Lynx
5	Sequoia Holmes	G	United States	Phoenix Mercury
6	Erica White	G	United States	Indiana Fever
7	Renae Camino	G	Australia	Sacramento Monarchs
8	No selection	—	—	New York Liberty
9	No selection	—	—	Los Angeles Sparks
10	No selection	—	—	Connecticut Sun
11	No selection	—	—	Detroit Shock
12	No selection	—	—	Seattle Storm
13	No selection	—	—	San Antonio Silver Stars
