= Michi Atkins =

American basketball player (born 1973)

Personal information
- Born: October 27, 1973 (age 53)
- Listed height: 6 ft 0 in (1.83 m)

Career information
- College: Texas Tech
- WNBA draft: 1997: Elite draft - round 2 round, 11th overall pick
- Drafted by: Charlotte Sting
- Position: Forward

Career highlights
- NCAA champion (1993); All-American – USBWA (1996); Second-team All-American – AP (1996)
- Stats at Basketball Reference

Michi Atkins from Loraine, Texas was a professional basketball player who was drafted by the Charlotte Sting in the 1997 WNBA elite draft. Although she never played a game in the WNBA, she would play professionally in Israel.

Atkins left Texas Tech as the Southwestern Athletic Conference (SWC) all-time leader in points scored with 2,134. She is also one of only two women players to score over 2,000 points in a college career in that conference, the other being Clarissa Davis with 2,008. Atkins was named the SWC female athlete of the year and conference MVP after both her junior and senior seasons.

== Career statistics ==
Legend
GP	Games played	GS	Games started	MPG	Minutes per game	RPG	Rebounds per game
APG	Assists per game	SPG	Steals per game	BPG	Blocks per game	PPG	Points per game
TO	Turnovers per game	FG%	Field-goal percentage	3P%	3-point field-goal percentage	FT%	Free-throw percentage
**Bold**	Career best	°	League leader

=== College ===
Year	Team	GP	GS	MPG	FG%	3P%	FT%	RPG	APG	SPG	BPG	TO	PPG
1992–93	Texas Tech	34	-	-	53.8	0.0	66.2	5.1	0.4	0.7	0.5	-	9.2
1993–94	Texas Tech	33	-	-	**54.9**	0.0	46.9	6.4	1.4	1.0	1.0	-	15.3
1994–95	Texas Tech	**37**	-	-	52.3	0.0	**73.3**	7.2	1.6	1.2	0.8	-	17.5
1995–96	Texas Tech	32	-	-	51.3	0.0	69.3	**11.6**	**2.5**	**1.4**	**1.2**	-	**20.9**
**Career**		136	-	-	52.8	0.0	63.6	7.5	1.5	1.1	0.9	-	15.7
Statistics retrieved from Sports-Reference.

== See also ==
- List of Texas Tech Lady Raiders in the WNBA draft
