= Carol Ross =

American basketball coach (born 1959)

Personal information
- Born: June 11, 1959 (age 67) Oakland, Mississippi, U.S.

Career information
- College: Ole Miss (1977–1981)
- Coaching career: 1982–2014

Career history

Coaching
- 1982–1983: Belhaven (assistant)
- 1983–1990: Auburn (assistant)
- 1990–2002: Florida
- 2003–2007: Ole Miss
- 2009–2011: Atlanta Dream (assistant)
- 2012–2014: Los Angeles Sparks

Career highlights
- WNBA Coach of the Year (2012)
Medals
Women's basketball
Assistant coach for United States
FIBA Under-19 World Championship
Gold medal – first place	2005 Tunis, Tunisia	Team competition

Carol Ross (born June 11, 1959) is an American college and professional basketball coach. Ross has served as the head women's basketball coach for the University of Florida and the University of Mississippi, and also as the head coach of the Los Angeles Sparks of the Women's National Basketball Association (WNBA).

== College playing career ==
Ross accepted an athletic scholarship to attend the University of Mississippi, where she was a four-year starter at guard for coach Van Chancellor's Ole Miss Lady Rebels basketball team from 1978 to 1981. She developed a reputation as a "pesky" and "tenacious" player who still holds the Ole Miss season record for steals (135), and ranks ninth on the Southeastern Conference (SEC) career steals list. She is one of only two Ole Miss players to record more than 1,000 points, 500 assists and 250 steals in a career. She served as team captain during her senior 1980–81 seasons, and was a key contributor to the overall 93–50 record compiled by the Lady Rebels during her four seasons. Ross graduated from Ole Miss with a bachelor's degree in education 1982, and was inducted into the University of Mississippi Athletic Hall of Fame in 2001.

== College coaching career ==
Ross began her college coaching career in 1982–83 as a volunteer assistant for the Belhaven Blazers women's basketball team at Belhaven College in Jackson, Mississippi. The following year she accepted a graduate assistant position with the Auburn Tigers women's basketball team of Auburn University in Auburn, Alabama. She stayed at Auburn for seven seasons, gradually being promoted to associate head coach and chief recruiter.

Presented with an offer to lead another SEC program in 1990, Ross became the head coach of the Florida Gators women's basketball team of the University of Florida. Before Ross, the Gators were a perennial cellar dweller; with Ross, the Gators became the SEC's fourth team of ten. Arguably the Gators' best season under Ross was 1996–97, when the Gators posted a 24–9 record, advanced to the NCAA Tournament Elite Eight, and earned their first-ever top-10 poll ranking, and DeLisha Milton was recognized as the best women's player in college basketball when she won the Wade Trophy. Her 2000–01 squad produced her best SEC finish – 11–3 and second place – while compiling an overall record of 24–6.

During her twelve seasons as the Gators' head coach, she coached multiple future WNBA players, including Vanessa Hayden, Merlakia Jones, DeLisha Milton-Jones, Murriel Page, Bridget Pettis, Tiffany Travis and Sophia Witherspoon, as well as future Gators head coach Amanda Butler. The Gators finished among the top-25 in seven of her final nine seasons. At the time of her resignation in 2002, her Gators had compiled an overall win–loss record of 247–121 (.6712), averaging more than twenty wins per year, earning nine NCAA Tournament invitations. Ross remains the winningest coach in the history of the Florida Gators women's basketball program.

She returned to her alma mater, the University of Mississippi, to become the head coach of the Ole Miss Rebels women's basketball team in 2003. During her four seasons at Ole Miss, Ross coached the Lady Rebels to an overall 77–50 record (.6063), and led the Rebels to two NCAA Tournaments and a pair of Women's National Invitation Tournament appearances. In her first season, 2003–04, she led Ole Miss back to the NCAA Tournament for the first time since 1995–96 and was recognized as the SEC Coach of the Year. In her fourth and final season, 2006–07, Ole Miss won twenty regular season games for the first time in more than a decade, advanced to the NCAA Tournament Elite Eight, and produced first-round WNBA Draft pick Armintie Price. Ross resigned as the Ole Miss head coach following the 2006–07 season.

== USA Basketball ==
Ross served as an assistant coach of the USA Women's Under-19 team representing the United States at the 2005 FIBA U19 World Championship in Tunis, Tunisia. Team USA won all eight of their games, including the championship game against Serbia & Montenegro. Team USA was dominant, winning every game by more than 20 points.

== WNBA coaching career ==
Ross joined the Atlanta Dream as an assistant coach in 2009. The Dream enjoyed a 14-game turnaround from its inaugural WNBA season in 2008, and tied for second place in the WNBA Eastern Conference. The Dream posted 21–13 records in 2010 and 2011, and tying for first place in the Eastern Conference in 2011 on the way to a second consecutive appearance in the WNBA Finals. Following the 2011 season, the Los Angeles Sparks hired Ross to be their new head coach.

In 2012, her first season as a WNBA head coach, Ross pushed the Sparks to a 24–10 record and a second-place finish in the WNBA Western Conference. In the 2012 WNBA playoffs, Ross's Sparks swept the San Antonio Silver Stars in two games in the Western Conference semifinals, before losing to the Minnesota Lynx in two games in the conference finals. After the 2012 season, Ross was honored as the WNBA Coach of the Year Award. In her follow-up season in 2013, the Sparks posted an identical record of 24–10 and again finished second in the Western Conference. The Sparks lost to the Phoenix Mercury, two games to one, in the Western Conference semifinals of the 2013 WNBA playoffs.

Despite having compiled an overall winning record of 24–10 in each of her first two seasons as head coach, Ross was fired by the Sparks management in the midst of the 2014 season when the team had posted a 10–12 record (3–7 at home), with twelve games remaining. Sparks general manager and executive vice president Penny Toler was named as the team's interim head coach. In 2012 and 2013, the Sparks had the third-best and second-best regular season records, respectively, in the twelve-team WNBA.

== Head coaching record ==
Team	Year	G	W	L	W–L%	Finish	PG	PW	PL	PW–L%	Result
Los Angeles	2012	34	24	10	.706	2nd in Western	4	2	2	.500	Lost in Conference semifinals
Los Angeles	2013	34	24	10	.706	2nd in Western	3	1	2	.333	Lost in Conference semifinals
Los Angeles	2014	22	10	12	.455	(Left mid-season)	—	—	—	—	—
Career		90	58	32	.644		7	3	4	.429	
