= 2014 Los Angeles Sparks season =

- Head coach: Carol Ross (10-12); Penny Toler (6-6)
- Arena: Staples Center

Results
- Record: 16–18 (.471)
- Place: 4th (Western)
- Playoff finish: Lost in Conference Semifinals

Media
- Television: TWC SportsNet and TWC Deportes; ESPN2, NBATV

The 2014 Los Angeles Sparks season was the franchise's 18th season in the Women's National Basketball Association, and the third and final season under head coach Carol Ross.

== Ownership Change ==
At the end of 2013, the Sparks' previous ownership group announced it was ceasing operation and transferring the team to the WNBA. The league, led by commissioner Laurel Richie, began to search for a new owner. The owners of the Golden State Warriors expressed interest in purchasing the team and moving it to the San Francisco area, but ultimately the team was sold to Guggenheim Partners, which also owns the Los Angeles Dodgers, ensuring the Sparks would remain in Los Angeles. The new owners include former Los Angeles Lakers star Magic Johnson.

== Roster ==
2014 Los Angeles Sparks roster
Players
Coaches

| Pos. | No. | Nat. | Name | Height | Weight | DOB | From | Yrs |
|---|---|---|---|---|---|---|---|---|
| F | 13 | (Sweden) | Abdi, Farhiya | 6' 2" (1.88m) | 180 lb (82kg) | 1992-05-31 | Sweden | 1 |
| G/F | 0 | (United States) | Beard, Alana | 5' 11" (1.8m) | 160 lb (73kg) | 1982-05-14 | Duke | 10 |
| F/C | 54 | (United States) | Greene, Nikki | 6' 4" (1.93m) | 192 lb (87kg) | 1990-09-06 | Penn State | 1 |
| F/C | 7 | (France) | Gruda, Sandrine | 6' 4" (1.93m) | 185 lb (84kg) | 1987-06-25 | France | 4 |
| G | 10 | (United States) | Harding, Lindsey | 5' 8" (1.73m) | 135 lb (61kg) | 1984-06-12 | Duke | 7 |
| G/F | 22 | (United States) | Harrington, Armintie | 5' 9" (1.75m) | 132 lb (60kg) | 1985-04-03 | Mississippi | 7 |
| C | 42 | (United States) | Lavender, Jantel | 6' 4" (1.93m) | 185 lb (84kg) | 1988-11-12 | Ohio State | 3 |
| F | 30 | (United States) | Ogwumike, Nneka | 6' 2" (1.88m) | 188 lb (85kg) | 1990-07-02 | Stanford | 3 |
| F/C | 3 | (United States) | Parker, Candace | 6' 4" (1.93m) | 175 lb (79kg) | 1986-04-19 | Tennessee | 6 |
| G | 20 | (United States) | Toliver, Kristi | 5' 7" (1.7m) | 130 lb (59kg) | 1987-01-27 | Maryland | 5 |
| G | 2 | (United States) | Wiggins, Candice | 5' 11" (1.8m) | 147 lb (67kg) | 1987-02-14 | Stanford | 6 |

Head coach
(United States) Penny Toler (Long Beach State)
Assistant coaches
(United States) Steve Smith
(United States) Gary Kloppenburg (UC San Diego)
Athletic trainer
(United States) Courtney Watson (California)
Strength and conditioning coach
(United States) Bruce Deziel (Ohio)

Legend

- (C) Team captain
- (DP) Unsigned draft pick
- (FA) Free agent
- (S) Suspended
- Injured
