= Penny Toler =

American basketball executive and former player (born 1966)

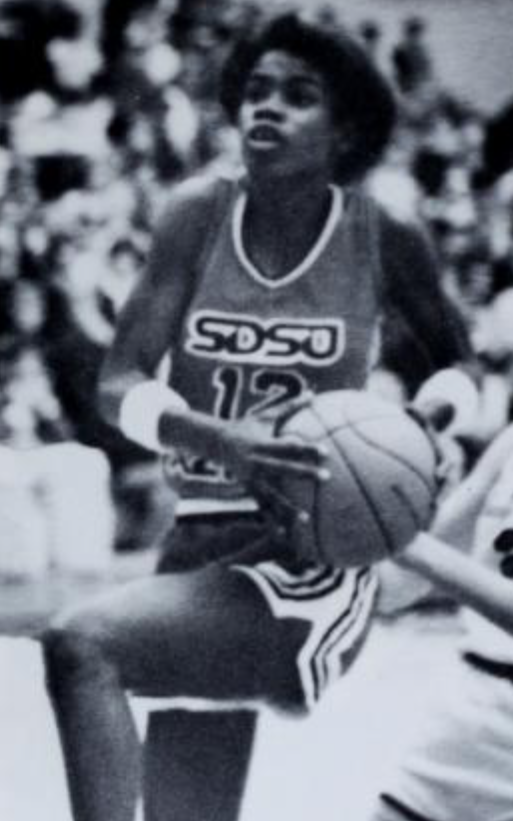
- Toler with the San Diego State Aztecs c. 1985

Personal information
- Born: March 24, 1966 (age 60) Washington, D.C., U.S.
- Listed height: 5 ft 8 in (1.73 m)
- Listed weight: 132 lb (60 kg)

Career information
- High school: St. Anthony (Washington, D.C.)
- College: San Diego State (1984–1985); Long Beach State (1986–1989)
- Playing career: 1989–1999
- Position: Point guard
- Number: 11
- Coaching career: 2014–2014

Career history

Playing
- 1989–1991: Montecchio
- 1991–1994: Pescara
- 1994–1996: Sporting Flash
- 1996–1997: Ramat HaSharon
- 1997–1999: Los Angeles Sparks

Coaching
- 2014: Los Angeles Sparks (interim)

Career highlights
- No. 11 retired by Los Angeles Sparks; 2× Kodak All-American (1988, 1989); 2× Big West Player of the Year (1988, 1989); 3× PCAA Tournament MVP (1987–1989); 3× First-team All-Big West (1987–1989)
- Stats at Basketball Reference

Virginia Marlita "Penny" Toler (born March 24, 1966) is an American basketball executive and former player who served most recently as the general manager of the Los Angeles Sparks of the Women's National Basketball Association (WNBA). Toler scored the first field goal and first free throw in WNBA history.

As of 2026, Toler is one of four players to have their jersey retired by the Sparks, the others being Lisa Leslie, Candace Parker, and DeLisha Milton-Jones.

== College years ==
Toler began her college career with the San Diego State Aztecs, joining a squad led by Tina Hutchinson. Toler then sat out a year after transferring to Long Beach State, where she became an All-American. During her career Long Beach State made it to the Final Four twice, in 1987 and 1988. Toler was considered one of the best ever collegiate players under future Hall of Fame coach Joan Bonvicini. In 1995 she was inducted into the Long Beach State Athletic Hall of Fame.

=== Long Beach State statistics ===
Legend
GP	Games played	GS	Games started	MPG	Minutes per game
FG%	Field goal percentage	3P%	3-point field goal percentage	FT%	Free throw percentage
RPG	Rebounds per game	APG	Assists per game	SPG	Steals per game
BPG	Blocks per game	PPG	Points per game	**Bold**	Career high

Year	Team	GP	Points	PPG	FG%	FT%
1986–87	Long Beach State	**36**	**787**	21.9	**54.5%**	77.0%
1987–88	Long Beach State	30	675	**22.5**	50.8%	78.3%
1988–89	Long Beach State	35	731	20.9	49.7%	**81.9%**
Career		101	2,193	21.7	51.7%	79.5%

== Professional career ==
Having no viable domestic professional options, Toler began her professional career in Italy, playing two seasons for Montecchio and three for Pescara. She then played two seasons in Greece for Sporting Flash, and one in Israel for Ramat HaSharon.

=== WNBA ===
In 1997, she returned to the United States to play in the newly organized WNBA. Toler was allocated to the Los Angeles Sparks during the player initiation round in the 1997 WNBA draft. She is most commonly remembered as the first player to score a basket in the WNBA. She did so against the New York Liberty on June 21, 1997 19:01 hour at the Los Angeles Great Western Forum. Her shot was a side jumper. Toler also made the first free throw in the WNBA history. In that debut game, Toler recorded 15 points, 4 assists, 1 rebound and 1 steal with the Sparks losing the game 57 - 67.

Toler played 3 seasons with the Sparks, averaging 10 points, 2.8 rebounds and 4 assists in 88 games. From 1997 to 1999, the Sparks only made the playoffs during the 1999 season after finishing with a 20 - 12 record. They matched up against the Sacramento Monarchs in the first round and won the single game elimination, but lost 2 - 1 in the Western Conference Finals by the Houston Comets. In that series versus the Comets, Toler averaged 2.6 points, 1.3 assists in 25.4 minutes a game.

In November 1999 she retired as a player. Her final WNBA game was Game 3 of the previously mentioned Western Conference Finals against the Comets. That game was played on August 30, 1999 and the Sparks would lose 62 - 72 with Toler recording 1 point and 2 rebounds.

=== Post-playing career ===
She became a general manager for the Los Angeles Sparks and immediately after taking on a management role, she would assemble the Los Angeles Sparks roster that would become the championship team in 2001.

On July 20, 2014, Toler was named as interim head coach of the Sparks following the firing of Carol Ross. She stayed as Head Coach until the end of 2014 when Brian Agler took over on January 5, 2015. She helped coach the Sparks to a playoff appearance in 2014 but they were swept 2- 0 by the Phoenix Mercury in the Semi-Finals.

Toler was fired as vice president and general manager on October 4, 2019, after the Sparks were swept out of the WNBA Semi-Finals during the 2019 WNBA Playoffs. The move also came after the revelation that Toler entered the Sparks' locker room following their Game 2 loss and gave an obscenity-laced speech that included the use of the "N-word".

== International career ==
By the time the WNBA launched, Toler had already spent eight years playing basketball overseas. She has played five seasons in Italy, two seasons in Greece, and a season in Israel. While in Italy, she won a scoring title, two assist titles, and was MVP of the Italian all-star game.

== Career statistics ==
Legend
GP	Games played	GS	Games started	MPG	Minutes per game	RPG	Rebounds per game
APG	Assists per game	SPG	Steals per game	BPG	Blocks per game	PPG	Points per game
TO	Turnovers per game	FG%	Field-goal percentage	3P%	3-point field-goal percentage	FT%	Free-throw percentage
**Bold**	Career best	°	League leader

=== WNBA ===
==== Regular season ====
Year	Team	GP	GS	MPG	FG%	3P%	FT%	RPG	APG	SPG	BPG	TO	PPG
1997	Los Angeles	28	28	**32.4**	**.426**	.184	.839	3.4	**5.1**	**1.3**	**0.1**	3.8	**13.1**
1998	Los Angeles	**30**	**30**	31.5	.415	**.417**	.743	**3.5**	4.8	1.1	**0.1**	3.3	12.3
1999	Los Angeles	**30**	4	14.2	.340	.154	**.867**	1.4	2.2	0.4	0.0	**1.3**	4.8
Career	3 years, 1 team	88	62	25.9	.406	.306	.811	2.8	4.0	0.9	0.1	2.8	10.0

==== Playoffs ====
Year	Team	GP	GS	MPG	FG%	3P%	FT%	RPG	APG	SPG	BPG	TO	PPG
1999	Los Angeles	4	0	10.5	.333	.000	.500	1.5	0.5	0.5	0.0	0.8	2.5

== Head coaching record ==
Legend
Regular season	G	Games coached	W	Games won	L	Games lost	W–L %	Win–loss %
Playoffs	PG	Playoff games	PW	Playoff wins	PL	Playoff losses	PW–L %	Playoff win–loss %

=== WNBA ===
Team	Year	G	W	L	W–L%	Finish	PG	PW	PL	PW–L%	Result
Los Angeles	2014	12	6	6	.500	3rd in Western	2	0	2	.000	Lost conference semifinals
