= Orlando Woolridge =

American basketball player (1959–2012)

- Woolridge during his tenure coaching the Los Angeles Sparks

Personal information
- Born: December 16, 1959 Bernice, Louisiana, U.S.
- Died: May 31, 2012 (aged 52) Mansfield, Louisiana, U.S.
- Listed height: 6 ft 9 in (2.06 m)
- Listed weight: 215 lb (98 kg)

Career information
- High school: Mansfield (Mansfield, Louisiana)
- College: Notre Dame (1977–1981)
- NBA draft: 1981: 1st round, 6th overall pick
- Drafted by: Chicago Bulls
- Playing career: 1981–1996
- Position: Small forward
- Number: 0, 6
- Coaching career: 1998–1999, 2007–2009

Career history

Playing
- 1981–1986: Chicago Bulls
- 1986–1988: New Jersey Nets
- 1988–1990: Los Angeles Lakers
- 1990–1991: Denver Nuggets
- 1991–1993: Detroit Pistons
- 1993: Milwaukee Bucks
- 1993–1994: Philadelphia 76ers
- 1994–1995: Benetton Treviso
- 1995–1996: Buckler Bologna

Coaching
- 1998–1999: Los Angeles Sparks
- 2007–2008: Houston Takers
- 2008–2009: Arizona Rhinos

Career highlights
- FIBA European Cup champion (1995); FIBA European Cup (1995); Italian Cup winner (1995); Italian Cup MVP (1995); Italian Supercup winner (1995); Italian Supercup MVP (1995)

Career NBA statistics
- Points: 13,623 (16.0 ppg)
- Rebounds: 3,696 (4.3 rpg)
- Assists: 1,609 (1.9 apg)
- Stats at NBA.com
- Stats at Basketball Reference

Orlando Vernada Woolridge (December 16, 1959 – May 31, 2012) was an American professional basketball player in the National Basketball Association (NBA) from 1981 to 1994. He was known for his scoring ability, especially on slam dunks. He played college basketball for the Notre Dame Fighting Irish.

== Early life and education ==
Woolridge was born in Bernice, Louisiana, a town dependent on the lumber industry. After attending local schools, he went to the University of Notre Dame, where he played for the Fighting Irish. He played in the NCAA tournament's Final Four in 1978 as a freshman with teammates Kelly Tripucka and Bill Laimbeer (the two would later reunite as teammates of the Detroit Pistons during the 1990s).

Woolridge started every game as a college sophomore, junior and senior. He helped guide Notre Dame to NCAA tournament appearances in 1980 and 1981. The 6-foot-9-inch (2.06 m) forward played one season at center in 1979–80, when he made 58.5 percent of his field goals. Named a second-team All-American by The Sporting News in 1981, Woolridge made a last-second fall-away jumper to beat the eventual NBA Hall of Famer Ralph Sampson and No. 1 Virginia to end their 28-game winning streak. Throughout his collegiate career, he averaged 10.6 points, 5 rebounds, 1.2 assists per game and shot just under 60% from the field.

=== College ===
Legend
GP	Games played	GS	Games started	MPG	Minutes per game
FG%	Field goal percentage	3P%	3-point field goal percentage	FT%	Free throw percentage
RPG	Rebounds per game	APG	Assists per game	SPG	Steals per game
BPG	Blocks per game	PPG	Points per game	**Bold**	Career high

Year	Team	GP	GS	MPG	FG%	3P%	FT%	RPG	APG	SPG	BPG	PPG
1977–78	Notre Dame	24	–	9.6	.526	–	.485	2.1	0.5	–	–	4.1
1978–79	Notre Dame	**30**	**30**	25.1	.573	–	**.732**	4.8	1.4	**0.8**	0.4	11.0
1979–80	Notre Dame	27	27	30.9	.585	–	.692	**6.9**	**1.5**	0.7	**1.1**	12.2
1980–81	Notre Dame	28	28	**33.0**	**.650**	–	.667	6.0	1.4	0.5	0.8	**14.4**
Career		109	85	25.1	.595	–	.669	5.0	1.2	0.5	0.6	10.6

== Professional career ==
=== NBA ===
Woolridge was selected sixth in the 1981 NBA draft by the Chicago Bulls, where he played for his first five seasons. Woolridge made his NBA debut on November 7, 1981. Woolridge was named NBA Player of the Week on December 9, 1984. During the 1984–85 season, Woolridge averaged 22.9 points per game and combined with rookie teammate Michael Jordan to average over 51 points per game. Prior to the Jordan era, Woolridge was one of the Chicago Bulls' marquee players along with Hall of Famer Artis Gilmore, Reggie Theus and David Greenwood. At 6 ft 9 in (2.06 m) tall, and weighing 215 lb (98 kg), Woolridge was one of the most gifted dunkers in professional basketball. Woolridge was also one of the original alley-oop artists. Woolridge competed in the NBA Slam Dunk Contest in 1984 and 1985, and was the first to complete what would be called the eastbay funk dunk in 1984 surpassing the scores of Clyde Drexler and Michael Cooper. Woolridge led the Chicago Bulls in scoring in 1986 and was the last player to lead in scoring before Jordan took over. While unstoppable on the open court, his one-dimensional play did not complement Jordan's skills.

He moved on to sign with the New Jersey Nets as a veteran free-agent on October 2, 1986 for the 1986–87 season, in which he averaged 20.7 points per game. After playing 19 games during the 1987–88 season, Woolridge was suspended by the league for violation of the league substance abuse policy.

On August 10, 1988, he signed as an unrestricted free agent with the Los Angeles Lakers, who were looking for a scorer off the bench. "I just love it when we go up in the transition game, up and down the court, Magic (Johnson) looking for the open guy ... That's the way I love playing," said Woolridge about teammate Magic Johnson and the Lakers shortly after joining the team. Woolridge averaged 11 points per game in two seasons and provided the Lakers consistent bench scoring around the basket. His 55.6% field goal percentage during the 1989–90 season ranked fifth in the league.

Woolridge was traded for two second-round draft picks to the Denver Nuggets, which started playing an unusual hurry-up offense under head coach Paul Westhead in 1990–91. The prolific offense resulted in Woolridge's averaging 25.1 points per game and a career high 6.8 rebounds per game, but did not result in many team wins. Through most of the season until December, Woolridge led the NBA in scoring. That month, he was sidelined after eye surgery due to a detached retina during a game collision. He was third in the league averaging 29.0 points at the time.

After his only season in Denver, Woolridge played with the Detroit Pistons during the 1991–92 season. He split the 1992–93 season between the Pistons and the Milwaukee Bucks, and finished his NBA career at the end of the 1993–94 season where he played for the Philadelphia 76ers. He held NBA career averages of 16.0 points, 4.3 rebounds and 1.9 assists per game. He never won an NBA championship.

=== Europe ===
Woolridge played professionally in Italy, with the Italian League club Benetton Treviso. Playing under head coach Mike D'Antoni, he won the FIBA European Cup in the 1994–95 season, and also won the Italian Cup. Woolridge then signed to play with Buckler Bologna for the 1995–96 season and won the Italian Supercup.

== NBA career statistics ==
Legend
GP	Games played	GS	Games started	MPG	Minutes per game
FG%	Field goal percentage	3P%	3-point field goal percentage	FT%	Free throw percentage
RPG	Rebounds per game	APG	Assists per game	SPG	Steals per game
BPG	Blocks per game	PPG	Points per game	**Bold**	Career high

=== Regular season ===
Year	Team	GP	GS	MPG	FG%	3P%	FT%	RPG	APG	SPG	BPG	PPG
1981–82	Chicago	75	12	15.8	.513	.000	.699	3.0	1.1	0.3	0.3	7.3
1982–83	Chicago	57	38	28.5	**.580**	.000	.638	5.2	1.7	0.7	0.8	16.5
1983–84	Chicago	75	74	33.9	.525	**.500**	.715	4.9	1.8	0.9	0.8	19.3
1984–85	Chicago	77	**76**	**36.6**	.554	.000	.785	5.6	1.8	0.8	0.5	22.9
1985–86	Chicago	70	59	32.1	.495	.174	.788	5.0	3.0	0.7	0.7	20.7
1986–87	New Jersey	75	53	35.2	.521	.125	.777	4.9	3.5	0.7	**1.1**	20.7
1987–88	New Jersey	19	12	32.7	.445	.000	.708	4.8	**3.7**	0.7	**1.1**	16.4
1988–89	L.A. Lakers	74	0	20.1	.468	.000	.738	3.6	0.8	0.4	0.9	9.7
1989–90	L.A. Lakers	62	2	22.9	.556	.000	.733	3.0	1.5	0.6	0.7	12.7
1990–91	Denver	53	50	34.4	.498	.000	**.797**	**6.8**	2.2	**1.3**	0.4	**25.1**
1991–92	Detroit	**82**	61	25.8	.498	.111	.683	3.2	1.1	0.5	0.4	14.0
1992–93	Detroit	50	47	29.5	.479	.000	.673	3.5	2.2	0.5	0.5	13.1
1992–93	Milwaukee	8	0	9.8	.545	.000	.778	1.1	0.4	0.1	0.3	5.4
1993–94	Philadelphia	74	1	26.4	.471	.071	.689	4.0	1.9	0.6	0.8	12.7
Career		851	485	28.3	.513	.091	.737	4.3	1.9	0.6	0.7	16.0

=== Playoffs ===
Year	Team	GP	GS	MPG	FG%	3P%	FT%	RPG	APG	SPG	BPG	PPG
1984–85	Chicago	4	4	41.8	.500	.000	.778	3.3	**2.0**	**1.5**	0.3	20.5
1985–86	Chicago	3	3	**45.0**	.403	.000	**.867**	**4.7**	1.3	1.0	0.3	**21.0**
1988–89	L.A. Lakers	**15**	0	18.4	.520	.000	.710	**4.7**	1.1	0.1	**1.0**	8.1
1989–90	L.A. Lakers	9	0	22.1	**.571**	.000	.703	2.6	1.1	0.9	0.9	11.8
1991–92	Detroit	5	**5**	25.6	.442	.000	.563	2.0	0.6	0.2	0.2	11.0
Career		36	12	25.1	.492	.000	.716	3.6	1.2	0.6	0.7	11.9

== Head coaching record ==
Legend
Regular season	G	Games coached	W	Games won	L	Games lost	W–L %	Win–loss %
Playoffs	PG	Playoff games	PW	Playoff wins	PL	Playoff losses	PW–L %	Playoff win–loss %

=== WNBA ===
Team	Year	G	W	L	W–L%	Finish	PG	PW	PL	PW–L%	Result
Los Angeles	1998	10	5	5	.500	3rd in Western	—	—	—	—	Missed playoffs
Los Angeles	1999	32	20	12	.625	2nd in Western	4	2	2	.500	Lost conference finals
Career		42	25	17	.595		4	2	2	.500	

== Coaching and later years ==
After retiring as a player, Woolridge coached the Los Angeles Sparks of the WNBA in 1998 and 1999. Woolridge later coached the Arizona Rhinos of the ABA from 2008 to 2009.

== Personal life and death ==
Woolridge's son, Renaldo, also became a professional basketball player. Woolridge was a cousin to Naismith Memorial Basketball Hall of Fame member Willis Reed.

After a long battle with heart disease, Woolridge died on May 31, 2012, at his parents' home in Mansfield, Louisiana.
