= Kim Perrot Sportsmanship Award =

Women's National Basketball Association award

- Sport: Basketball
- League: Women's National Basketball Association (WNBA)
- Awarded for: WNBA player who most exemplifies ideals of sportsmanship

The Kim Perrot Sportsmanship Award is an annual Women's National Basketball Association (WNBA) award given since the league's inaugural 1997 season, to the player who most "exemplifies the ideals of sportsmanship on the court—ethical behavior, fair play and integrity." This is the same criterion used by the analogous NBA Sportsmanship Award, given by the NBA since its 1995–96 season.

Every year, each of the WNBA teams nominates one of its players to compete for this award. From these nominees, a panel of sportswriters and broadcasters vote for first and second place winners. First-place selections receive two votes, while second-place selections receive one. The player with the highest point total, regardless of the number of first-place votes, wins the award.

Since the 2000 WNBA season, the award is named for the late Kim Perrot, who helped guide the Houston Comets to their first two WNBA championships before she died in August, 1999, after suffering from cancer for seven months.

Nneka Ogwumike has won the award the most times, with five selections.

== Winners ==
	Denotes player who is still active in the WNBA
	Inducted into the Women's Basketball Hall of Fame
	Inducted into the Naismith Memorial Basketball Hall of Fame
Player (X)	Denotes the number of times the player has won
Team (X)	Denotes the number of times a player from this team has won

Season	Player	Position	Nationality	Team
1997	Zheng Haixia	Center	China	Los Angeles Sparks
1998	Suzie McConnell Serio	Guard	United States	Cleveland Rockers
1999	Dawn Staley	Guard	United States	Charlotte Sting
2000	Suzie McConnell Serio (2)	Guard	United States	Cleveland Rockers (2)
2001	Sue Wicks	Forward	United States	New York Liberty
2002	Jennifer Gillom	Forward / Center	United States	Phoenix Mercury
2003	Edna Campbell	Guard	United States	Sacramento Monarchs
2004	Teresa Edwards	Guard	United States	Minnesota Lynx
2005	Taj McWilliams-Franklin	Forward / Center	United States	Connecticut Sun
2006	Dawn Staley (2)	Guard	United States	Houston Comets
2007	Tully Bevilaqua	Guard	Australia	Indiana Fever
2008	Vickie Johnson	Guard / Forward	United States	San Antonio Silver Stars
2009	Kara Lawson	Guard	United States	Sacramento Monarchs (2)
2010	Tamika Catchings	Forward	United States	Indiana Fever (2)
2011	Sue Bird	Guard	United States	Seattle Storm
2011	Ruth Riley	Center	United States	San Antonio Silver Stars (2)
2012	Kara Lawson (2)	Guard	United States	Connecticut Sun (2)
2013	Swin Cash	Forward	United States	Chicago Sky
2013	Tamika Catchings (2)	Forward	United States	Indiana Fever (3)
2014	Becky Hammon	Guard	Russia^{[a]}	San Antonio Stars (3)
2015	DeLisha Milton-Jones	Forward	United States	Atlanta Dream
2016	Tamika Catchings (3)	Forward	United States	Indiana Fever (4)
2017	Sue Bird (2)	Guard	United States	Seattle Storm (2)
2018	Sue Bird (3)	Guard	United States	Seattle Storm (3)
2019	Nneka Ogwumike	Forward	United States	Los Angeles Sparks (2)
2020	Nneka Ogwumike (2)	Forward	United States	Los Angeles Sparks (3)
2021	Nneka Ogwumike (3)	Forward	United States	Los Angeles Sparks (4)
2022	Sylvia Fowles	Center	United States	Minnesota Lynx (2)
2023	Elizabeth Williams	Center	United States	Chicago Sky (2)
2024	Dearica Hamby	Forward	United States	Los Angeles Sparks (5)
2025	Nneka Ogwumike (4)	Forward	United States	Seattle Storm (4)
2026	Nneka Ogwumike (5)	Forward	United States	Los Angeles Sparks (6)

Notes

- ^{a} Denotes a player who is a United States citizen but is naturalized and represents a different country internationally.

== Multi-time winners ==
Awards	Player	Team(s)	Years
5	Nneka Ogwumike	Los Angeles Sparks (4) / Seattle Storm (1)	2019, 2020, 2021, 2025, 2026
3	Sue Bird	Seattle Storm	2011, 2017, 2018
3	Tamika Catchings	Indiana Fever	2010, 2013, 2016
2	Dawn Staley	Charlotte Sting (1) / Houston Comets (1)	1999, 2006
2	Kara Lawson	Sacramento Monarchs (1) / Connecticut Sun (1)	2009, 2012
2	Suzie McConnell Serio	Cleveland Rockers	1998, 2000

== See also ==
- List of sports awards honoring women
