= Rehema Stephens =

American basketball player

Personal information
- Born: December 28, 1969 (age 56)

Career information
- High school: Oakland Tech (Oakland, California)
- College: UCLA
- WNBA draft: 1998: 3rd round, 25th overall pick
- Drafted by: Los Angeles Sparks
- Position: Guard

Career highlights
- 3x All Pac-10 (1990-1992)
- Stats at Basketball Reference

Rehema Stephens (born December 28, 1969) is a former professional basketball player for the Sacramento Monarchs.

She played basketball at Oakland Technical High School, making all-league in 1985, 1987, and 1988. In 1986-87 she was named first team All-State and third team Parade All American. In college, she played one season for the University of Colorado and three seasons for the University of California, Los Angeles. At UCLA she led the Pac-10 Conference in scoring in her first and second seasons; in her second season she was the fifth-highest scorer in the country. She reached 1,000 points faster than any other Lady Bruin and is still the school's second-highest career scorer in women's basketball.

She graduated from UCLA with a degree in psychology, then turned pro. She played basketball in Australia and Greece before joining the Monarchs. Retiring from basketball after one season, she has since worked as a teacher, Realtor, radio host and author.

== Career statistics ==
Legend
GP	Games played	GS	Games started	MPG	Minutes per game	RPG	Rebounds per game
APG	Assists per game	SPG	Steals per game	BPG	Blocks per game	PPG	Points per game
TO	Turnovers per game	FG%	Field-goal percentage	3P%	3-point field-goal percentage	FT%	Free-throw percentage
**Bold**	Career best	°	League leader

=== WNBA career statistics ===
==== Regular season ====
Year	Team	GP	GS	MPG	FG%	3P%	FT%	RPG	APG	SPG	BPG	TO	PPG
1998	Sacramento	8	0	10.1	26.8	16.7	50.0	1.3	0.5	0.3	0.1	1.4	3.3
Career	1 year, 1 team	8	0	10.1	26.8	16.7	50.0	1.3	0.5	0.3	0.1	1.4	3.3

=== College ===
Year	Team	GP	GS	MPG	FG%	3P%	FT%	RPG	APG	SPG	BPG	TO	PPG
1989–90	UCLA	29	-	-	39.9	20.0	70.1	6.4	1.4	1.6	**0.2**	-	20.1
1990–91	UCLA	28	-	-	**44.2**	**39.2**	70.3	**8.0**	**2.3**	**2.0**	0.4	-	**25.3**
1991–92	UCLA	**30**	-	-	39.7	19.1	**82.0**	7.7	1.8	1.5	0.6	-	19.8
**Career**		87	-	-	41.3	30.2	73.9	7.4	1.9	1.7	0.4	-	21.7
Statistics retrieved from Sports-Reference.
