= Daedra Charles =

American basketball player and coach (1968–2018)

Personal information
- Born: November 22, 1968 Detroit, Michigan, U.S.
- Died: April 14, 2018 (aged 49) Detroit, Michigan, U.S.
- Listed height: 6 ft 2 in (1.88 m)
- Listed weight: 141 lb (64 kg)

Career information
- High school: Saint Martin de Porres (Detroit, Michigan)
- College: Tennessee (1988–1991)
- Position: Power forward / center
- Number: 32

Career history

Playing
- 1994–1995: Tarbes Gespe Bigorre
- 1997: Los Angeles Sparks

Coaching
- 2003–2006: Detroit (assistant)
- 2006–2008: Auburn (assistant)
- 2008–2010: Tennessee (assistant)

Career highlights
- As a player: 2× NCAA champion (1989, 1991); Wade Trophy (1991); 2× Kodak All-American (1990, 1991); SEC Female Athlete of the Year (1991); 2× First-team All-SEC (1990, 1991); Michigan Miss Basketball (1986)
- Stats at Basketball Reference
- Women's Basketball Hall of Fame
Medals
Women's basketball
Representing the United States
Olympic Games
Bronze medal – third place	1992 Barcelona	Team competition
FIBA World Championship for Women
Bronze medal – third place	1994 Sydney	Team competition

Daedra Janel Charles (November 22, 1968 – April 14, 2018) was an American women's basketball player and assistant coach at Tennessee. She was a member of the United States women's national basketball team that claimed the bronze medal at the 1992 Summer Olympics in Barcelona, Spain. Born in Detroit, Michigan, Charles attended the University of Tennessee. She twice helped Tennessee win the NCAA Women's Championship in 1989 and 1991. Charles was inducted into the Women's Basketball Hall of Fame in 2007.

== USA Basketball ==
Charles was named to the national team invited to compete at the 1992 Olympics, held in Barcelona, Spain. The USA team won their first three games, but then played the Unified Team and fell, 79–73. The USA team then faced Cuba for the bronze medal. The game was tied at halftime, and Cuba had a small lead midway through the second half, but the USA went on a run to retake the lead, and finished with an 88–74 victory and the bronze medal. Charles averaged 6.2 points per game.

Charles continued to represent the USA on the national team when it competed in the 1994 World Championships in Sydney, Australia. The team was coached by Tara VanDerveer. The team won their early games. Against Spain, Charles led the USA scorers with 18 points, helping secure the win. She also contributed 22 points to a win against the host team Australia. The team then advanced to the medal rounds and faced Brazil. Despite 29 points from Katrina McClain, the USA fell 110–107 when Brazil hit ten of ten free throws in the final minute. The USA went on to defeat Australia 100–95 to claim the bronze medal.

== WNBA ==
Charles was selected as the 8th overall pick in the 1997 WNBA Elite Draft by the Los Angeles Sparks. Her debut game was played on June 21, 1997 in a 57 - 67 loss to the New York Liberty. Charles started the game but only played 7 minutes while recording 1 rebound and 1 block but no points. She played only 28 games in her career, all of them during the 1997 season with the Sparks. Her debut game would also be the only time she started a game in her career. The Sparks finished the 1997 season 14 - 14 and missed the playoffs.

Charles would not play in the WNBA after this season. And because the Sparks missed the playoffs, Charles' final WNBA game was the last regular season game of that year. That game was played on August 24, 1997 where the Sparks were defeated 68 - 73 by the Phoenix Mercury. Charles played 12 minutes and only recorded 1 block as a statistic.

== Awards and honors ==
- 1991—Wade Trophy

== Career statistics ==
Legend
GP	Games played	GS	Games started	MPG	Minutes per game	RPG	Rebounds per game
APG	Assists per game	SPG	Steals per game	BPG	Blocks per game	PPG	Points per game
TO	Turnovers per game	FG%	Field-goal percentage	3P%	3-point field-goal percentage	FT%	Free-throw percentage
**Bold**	Career best	°	League leader

=== College ===
Year	Team	GP	Points	FG%	FT%	RPG	APG	SPG	BPG	PPG
1989	Tennessee	**37**	363	53.9%	56.7%	6.7	0.7	1.5	0.6	9.8
1990	Tennessee	33	525	55.1%	56.1%	8.7	0.8	1.6	**1.1**	15.9
1991	Tennessee	35	**607**	**56.1%**	**58.5%**	**9.2**	**1.2**	**2.1**	1.1	**17.3**
Career		105	1495	55.2%	57.2%	8.2	0.9	1.8	0.9	14.2

=== WNBA ===
==== Regular season ====
Year	Team	GP	GS	MPG	FG%	3P%	FT%	RPG	APG	SPG	BPG	TO	PPG
1997	Los Angeles	28°	1	10.1	.403	.000	.667	1.7	.4	.4	.4	.5	2.3

== Death ==
Charles died from undisclosed reasons on April 14, 2018, aged 49.
