= Los Angeles Sparks =

Women's National Basketball Association team in Los Angeles, California

- 2026 Los Angeles Sparks season
- Conference: Western
- Leagues: WNBA
- Founded: 1997
- History: Los Angeles Sparks; 1997–present
- Arena: Crypto.com Arena
- Location: Los Angeles, California
- Team colors: Purple, gold, black, teal, white
- Main sponsor: UCLA Health
- General manager: Ariana Andonian
- Head coach: Vacant
- Assistants: Zach O'Brien; Zak Buncik; Ebony Hoffman
- Ownership: Sparks LA Sports; Mark Walter (majority); Magic Johnson, Stan Kasten, Todd Boehly, Bobby Patton, Eric Holoman (minority)
- Championships: 3 (2001, 2002, 2016)
- Conference titles: 3 (2001, 2002, 2003) (Note: The WNBA awarded conference championships to the winners of the Conference Finals in the playoffs from 1998 to 2015.)
- Website: sparks.wnba.com
Heroine	Explorer	Rebel

The Los Angeles Sparks are an American professional basketball team based in Los Angeles. The Sparks compete in the Women's National Basketball Association (WNBA) as a member of the Western Conference. The team plays its home games at Crypto.com Arena. The Sparks were founded before the league's inaugural 1997 season began. Like some other WNBA teams, the Sparks have the distinction of not being affiliated with an NBA counterpart, even though the market is shared with the Los Angeles Lakers and the Los Angeles Clippers.

Lakers owner Jerry Buss owned the Sparks as a sister team to the Los Angeles Lakers from 1997 to 2006. Since 2014, the Sparks have been owned by Sparks LA Sports, a group consisting of Mark Walter, Magic Johnson, Stan Kasten, Todd Boehly, Bobby Patton, and Eric Holoman.

The Sparks have qualified for the WNBA playoffs in twenty of their twenty-eight years in Los Angeles, more than any other team in the league. The franchise has been home to many high-quality players such as 6 feet 4 inches (1.93 m) center and Tennessee standout Candace Parker, point guard Nikki Teasley, and nearby USC alums Lisa Leslie and Tina Thompson. In 2001, 2002, 2003, 2016 and 2017, the Sparks went to the WNBA Finals. They won the title in 2001, 2002, and 2016, beating Charlotte, New York, and Minnesota respectively, but fell short to Detroit in 2003 and Minnesota in 2017.

== History ==
=== 1997–2000: Beginnings and bright future ===
The 1997 WNBA season, the league's first, opened with a game between the Sparks and the New York Liberty at the Sparks home (The Forum) in Inglewood. The Sparks lost the game 57–67. Sparks player Penny Toler scored the league's first two points with a lay-up 59 seconds into the game. The Sparks finished with a record of 14–14. The team did compete for a playoff spot, but because of a loss to the Phoenix Mercury in the final game of the season, the Sparks missed the playoffs. In the 1998 WNBA season, the Sparks finished 12–18, missing the playoffs once more.

The 1999 season featured the development of Lisa Leslie and the Sparks' first playoff berth, as the Sparks posted a 20–12 record. The Sparks won their first playoff game and series with a win over the Sacramento Monarchs. They played in the Western Conference Finals but fell to the defending champion Houston Comets, 2 games to 1, in the three-game series.

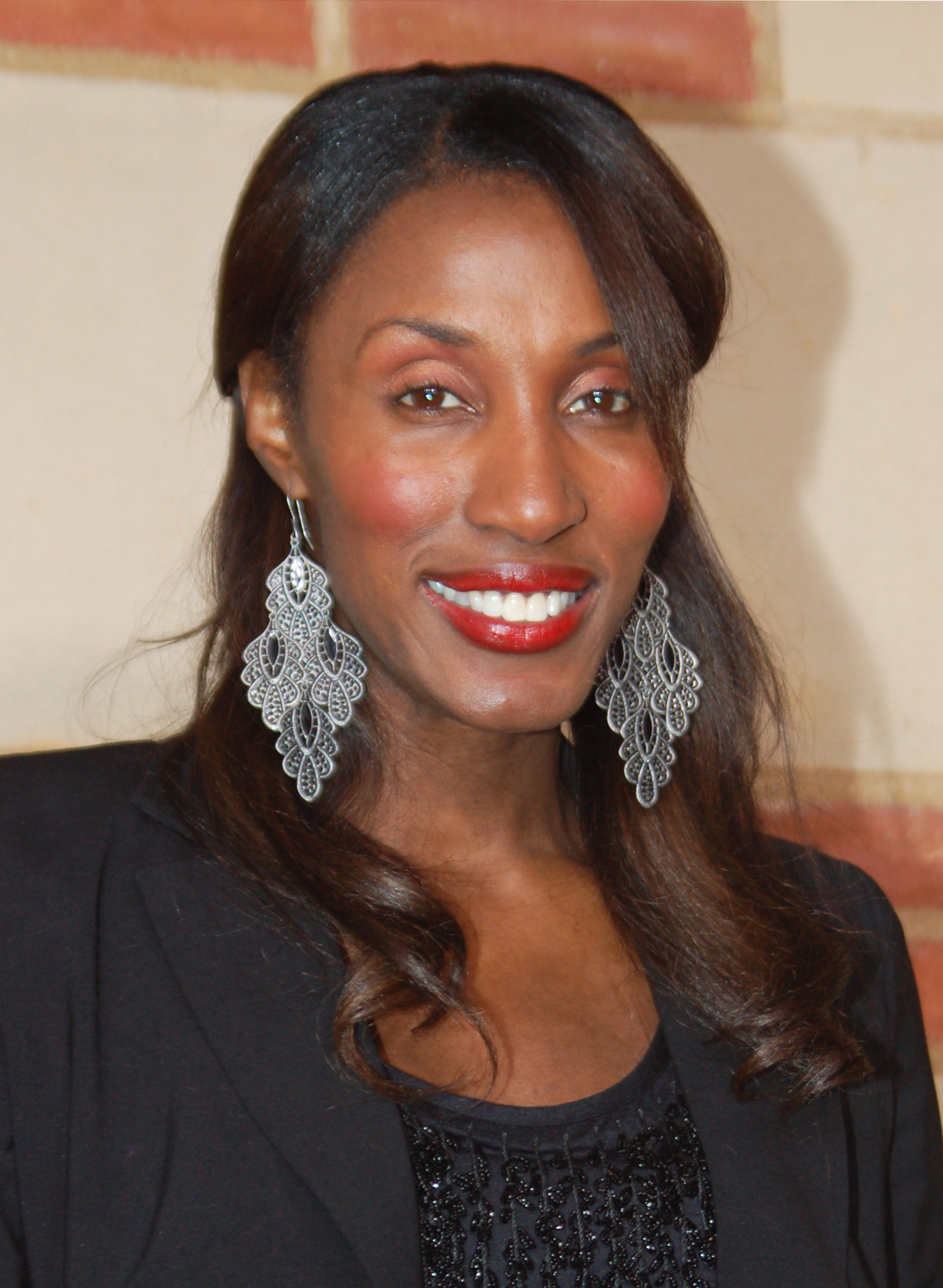
Lisa Leslie

The 2000 season was a record one, as the Sparks had a 28–4 record, the best in league history, and second only to the 1998 Houston Comets for best all-time. In the playoffs, the Sparks swept the Phoenix Mercury in the first round but lost in the Western Conference Finals again, when they were swept by the Comets. Ultimately, the Sparks were playing in the shadow of the Comets, who won the first four WNBA championships.

=== 2001–2002: Back-to-back championships ===
The 2000–01 off-season saw a move to the Staples Center and a coaching change, when the Sparks hired former Los Angeles Lakers player Michael Cooper as head coach. During the ensuing regular season, the Sparks again posted a 28–4 record. In the 2001 playoffs, the Sparks finally eliminated the Comets, sweeping them in the first round. The Sparks took all three games to eliminate the Monarchs to earn their first berth in the WNBA Finals, in which they swept the Charlotte Sting, 2–0, for their first league championship.

In 2002, Leslie became the first woman in the league to dunk the ball during a game, and once again the Sparks dominated the regular season, posting a 25–7 record. The Sparks then flew through the playoffs, sweeping both the Seattle Storm and the Utah Starzz. In the finals, the Sparks were matched against the Liberty, who were still looking for their first championship. A late three-pointer in game 2 by Nikki Teasley gave the Sparks their second consecutive championship.

=== 2003: Chasing a three-peat ===
In 2003, the Sparks posted a 24–10 record and went into the playoffs looking for a "three-peat". Both the first and the second rounds were forced to deciding third games, as they beat the Minnesota Lynx and Sacramento Monarchs. The Sparks then faced the upstart Detroit Shock in the Finals. The Shock were on a roll after having been the worst team in the WNBA in 2002. The Finals were a battle fueled by the relationship between head coaches Michael Cooper (Sparks) and Bill Laimbeer (Shock) which stemmed from their days in the NBA. The rough road to the finals and the tough play of the Shock wore down the Sparks, who lost the series two games to one and failed to three-peat.

=== 2004–2006: Further championship contention ===
During the 2003-04 off-season, the Sparks signed two players, Tamika Whitmore and Teresa Weatherspoon, who had played for the New York Liberty. When the season began, the Sparks got off to a great start, but coach Cooper left at mid-season to seek a coaching job in the NBA. The loss of their coach was a factor in the team's so-so finish to the season, which ended with a record of 25–9. During the playoffs, the team lost in three games to the Sacramento Monarchs.

The Sparks never recovered through the 2005 season and finished with a 17–17 record. They barely made the playoffs as the number-four seed. In the first round, the Sparks were outplayed and swept by the eventual champion Monarchs.

In 2006, the Sparks played much better, posting a 25–9 record. In the playoffs, they defeated the Seattle Storm in three games. However, in the Western Conference finals, the Sparks' season was ended by the Monarchs for the third year in a row.

=== 2007: Rock bottom ===
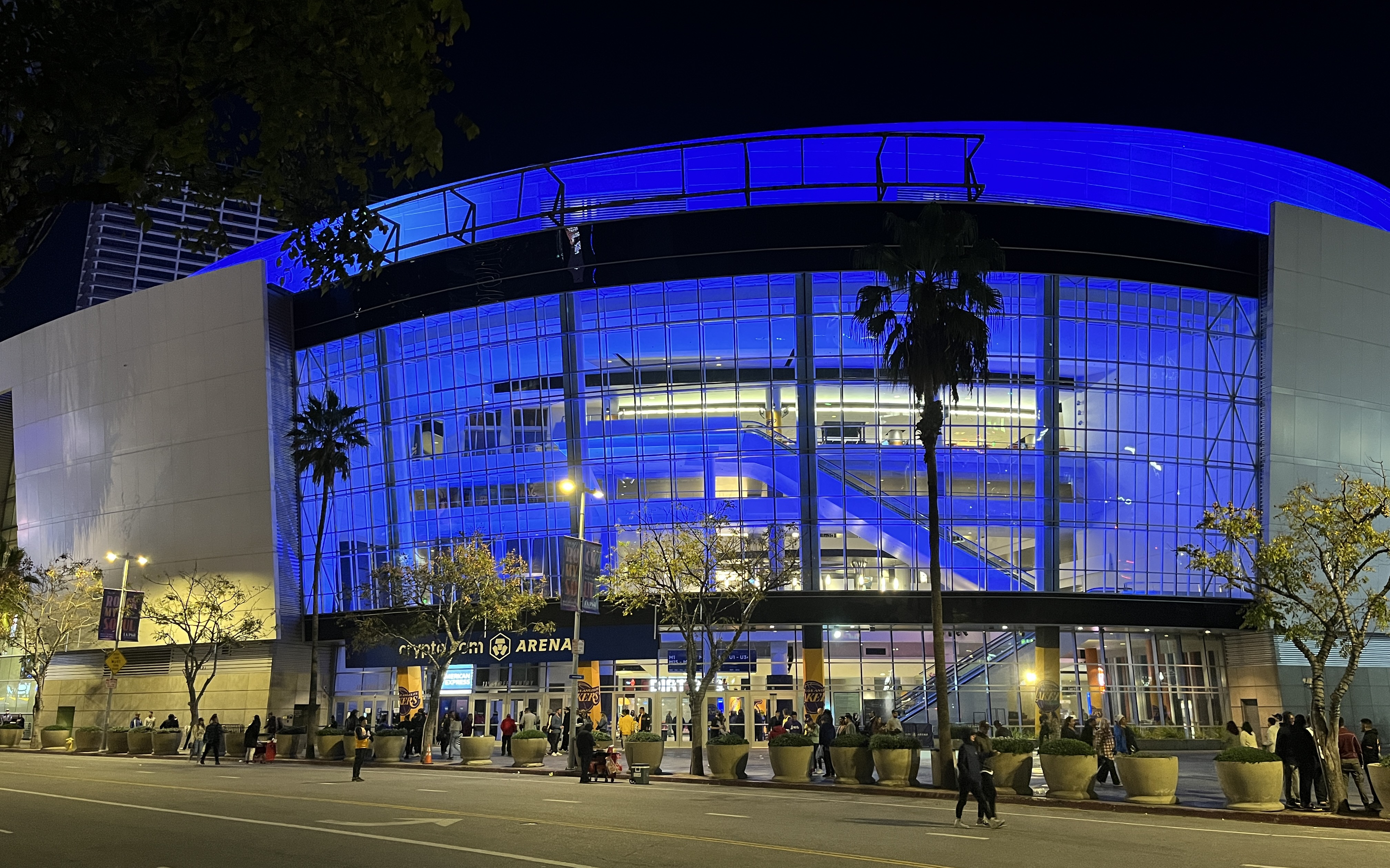
Crypto.com Arena

After the 2006 season ended, team president Johnny Buss resigned, and his father, team owner, Jerry Buss announced he was selling the Sparks. On December 7, 2006, the Los Angeles Times reported the sale to an investor group led by Kathy Goodman and Carla Christofferson. Goodman is a former executive for Intermedia Films. Christofferson is a litigation attorney for the O’Melveny & Myers law firm and was Miss North Dakota USA in 1989. The day after the sale was announced, team star Lisa Leslie announced that she was pregnant and would not play in the 2007 season. The Sparks posted a league-worst 10–24 record, also the worst in Sparks history. They missed the playoffs for the first time since 1998.

=== 2008–2015: Lisa Leslie's final years, the rise of Candace Parker, falling short and new ownership ===
Before the start of the 2008 season, the team's prospects improved dramatically. Lisa Leslie returned to the team, and on April 9, 2008, the team used its number-one draft pick to select Candace Parker, the college player of the year, the morning after Parker had led the University of Tennessee Lady Vols to their second-straight NCAA championship.

In 2008, the Sparks posted a 20–14 record and finished third in the Western Conference. Parker had won Rookie of the Year and WNBA MVP, becoming the first player in WNBA history to win both awards in the same season. In the playoffs, the Sparks beat the Seattle Storm 2–1 to reach the Western Conference Finals and compete against the San Antonio Silver Stars. The Sparks were on track to win game 2 of the series, but Silver Star Sophia Young made a turn-around bank-shot with a second left on the clock to force the series to a deciding game three. The Sparks lost game three, and the Silver Stars moved on to the WNBA Finals.

Following the 2008 season, Parker announced that she was pregnant. To compensate for Parker's absence, the Sparks signed native veteran superstar Tina Thompson (who had previously played for the former rival Houston Comets) and former Finals MVP Betty Lennox in free agency. With the addition of Thompson and Lennox, the Sparks added more championship experience and veteran leadership to their roster to them help them compete for another title.

The 2009 season had started poorly for the Sparks. Parker began the season on maternity leave, and Leslie suffered a knee injury early in the season. Both Leslie and Parker returned to the court in July, however, sparking a 10–2 run which turned an 8–14 start into an 18–16 regular-season record and clinching the Sparks' tenth playoff appearance in their 13-year history. In the first round of the playoffs, the Sparks defeated the Seattle Storm for the third time in four years. In the Western Conference Finals, the Sparks' lost to the eventual champion Phoenix Mercury in three games. The end of the 2009 playoff run marked the end of Leslie's career as a player and Cooper's second tenure as Sparks' head coach. In the off-season, former Sparks player Jennifer Gillom became the team's new head coach.

With the acquisition of former All-Star point guard Ticha Penicheiro and Parker establishing herself as the team's next franchise player, the 2010 Sparks believed they had the pieces to contend for a championship. However, Parker had season-ending shoulder surgery after the team started 3–7. Without her, the Sparks struggled, finishing 13–21, which was good enough to qualify them for fourth place in the Western Conference, but they were swept by the eventual champion Seattle Storm in the first round.

The 2011 season was eerily reminiscent of the previous year for the Sparks. The team started 4–3 but again Parker sustained an injury. Following three more losses, the Sparks fired head coach Gillom, promoting previous Sparks coach Joe Bryant. With Parker out until the end of the season, the Sparks headed into the All-Star break 6–8 and in fifth place. The Sparks finished the season three games out of the playoffs with a 15–19 record. Thompson would become a free agent and sign with the Seattle Storm.

In the 2012 season, the Sparks significantly improved, making it back to the playoffs since 2010, finishing second in the Western Conference with a 24–10 record. That same year they drafted Rookie of the Year and future MVP Nneka Ogwumike with the number-one pick. However, the Sparks were eliminated 2–0 in the first round by the Minnesota Lynx.

The team was owned by Williams Group Holdings (Paula Madison, majority owner) and Carla Christofferson, Nicholas J H, and Lisa Leslie (minority owners) until January 2014 when it was abruptly announced that WGH would relinquish all control. Paula Madison said that since becoming an owner in 2007, she and her family had lost $12 million, including $1.4 million in 2013. The team was temporarily absorbed by the league, and was then purchased by Sparks LA Sports, a group that included former NBA player Magic Johnson.

The 2014 and 2015 seasons would be disappointing for the Sparks as they had continued to be an underachieving playoff team, getting eliminated in the first round both years by the Phoenix Mercury and Minnesota Lynx respectively.

=== 2016: Champions once again ===
After making the playoffs in 2015, losing in the first round, the Sparks made subtle roster changes and improved the following year. Suddenly showing signs of championship contention, they finished with a 26–8 record and made it to the 2016 WNBA Playoffs. By this time, the Sparks had a "Big Three", consisting of Candace Parker, Nneka Ogwumike and Kristi Toliver. They earned the number 2 seed in the league and received a double bye to the semi-finals with the WNBA's new playoff format. The Sparks faced off against the Chicago Sky in the semi-finals and defeated the Sky 3 games to 1 to advance to the Finals for the first time since 2003. They faced the number 1 seeded Minnesota Lynx in the finals. They stole game 1 on the road when veteran forward Alana Beard made a game-winning jumper at the buzzer, lifting the team to a 78–76 victory. They lost game 2 79–60, but back in Los Angeles, put themselves one win away from their first title in over a decade with a dominant 92–75 game 3 victory. Even though they expected to clinch a championship on their home floor, they lost game 4 in a disappointing finish of 85–79. Game 5 was truly historic, against all odds, and swarmed with Minnesota fans, the 2016 WNBA MVP, Nneka Ogwumike grabbed an offensive rebound and made the game-winning shot to put the Sparks ahead 77–76 with 3.1 seconds remaining. The Sparks won their first championship since 2002 and their third championship in franchise history. Candace Parker was named the Finals MVP.

=== 2017–2020: Hunting more championships ===
Coming into the 2017 season, the Sparks had some changes made in their roster. Toliver left the Sparks in free agency to join the Washington Mystics, Chelsea Gray became the starting point guard, the Sparks traded for Odyssey Sims, drafted Sydney Wiese and retooled most of their bench, but kept their core intact. The Sparks once again finished as the second best team in the league with a 26–8 record with a double-bye to the semi-finals. The Sparks swept the Phoenix Mercury 3-0 in the semi-finals, advancing to the Finals for the second season in a row, setting up a rematch with the Lynx. In Game 1, Gray made a game-winning jumper with 2 seconds left to give the Sparks a 1-0 series lead. In Game 3, Parker set the Finals record for most steals in a game with 5 steals as the Sparks were up 2–1 in the Finals. With another opportunity to close out the series at home, the Sparks failed to deliver as they lost Game 4 80–69, extending the series to a deciding Game 5. The Sparks would lose Game 5, failing to win back-to-back championships.

In 2018, the Sparks continued to hold onto their core, but would underperform during the season, this time they would finish as the number 6 seed with a 19–15 record. They would start off their playoff run against the rival championship-defending Minnesota Lynx. They would defeat the Lynx 75–68, advancing to the second round. In the second round elimination game, the Sparks lost 96–64 to the Washington Mystics, ending their run of two consecutive finals appearances.

After the 2018 season, Brian Agler resigned as the coach of the Sparks. One month later, the Sparks announced that Derek Fisher had been hired as a replacement.

After the 2019 season, Penny Toler was dismissed as general manager.

=== 2021–present: Post-Parker playoff drought ===
Before the 2021 season, both Parker and Gray left the team in free agency. The Sparks failed to make playoffs for the first time since 2011.

On June 7, 2022, the Sparks and Fisher parted ways as head coach and general manager after the team started the year 5-7, despite the acquisition of Liz Cambage. Fisher went 54-46 as head coach during his Sparks tenure. Fred Williams took over as interim head coach, but the Sparks ultimately missed the playoffs once again.

For the 2023 season, Curt Miller was named the new head coach, and Karen Bryant was named the new general manager. The Sparks missed the playoffs for the third consecutive year, marking the first time in franchise history. They received the second overall pick in the draft lottery.

Before the 2024 season, Raegan Pebley was named the new general manager, while Nneka Ogwumike, the last remaining player from the 2016 championship team, departed the Sparks in free agency. Through trades, the Sparks acquired the fourth pick in the 2024 WNBA draft and, with their two lottery picks, selected Cameron Brink and Rickea Jackson. The Sparks finished the season with the league's worst record and subsequently parted ways with Miller. Following the season, the Sparks once again received the second overall pick in the draft lottery.

On November 19, 2024, Lynne Roberts was announced as the new head coach. Before the 2025 season, the Sparks traded away their second overall pick and acquired Kelsey Plum.

On April 9, 2026, the Sparks acquired Ariel Atkins from the Sky for Rickea Jackson.

=== Current home ===
The Los Angeles Sparks currently play in the Crypto.com Arena in Los Angeles, California. The capacity for a Sparks game is 13,141 because the upper level is closed off (capacity for a Lakers game is 18,997). The Sparks have played in the Crypto.com Arena since 2001. They previously played at The Forum but stayed there for two years after the Lakers departed for Crypto.com Arena until the venue was purchased by a local church.

=== Uniforms ===
- 2021–present: Nike and the WNBA unveiled new designs for all of its teams, and announced new edition uniforms. The Sparks unveiled a white uniform for the first time; all white uniforms were placed under the "Heroine" series. The purple uniform became part of the "Explorer" series, while a black third uniform was released as part of the "Rebel" series. The "Rebel" uniforms are similar to the NBA's "City" edition in that it evokes city or team culture and pride.
- 2018–2020: Nike replaced Adidas as uniform provider. EquiTrust remains jersey sponsor, while slight tweaks were made in the fonts and striping. Similar to the NBA, Nike's WNBA uniforms were classified under the "Icon" and "Statement" series, with the Sparks' gold and purple jerseys designated as such.
- 2015–2017: EquiTrust Life Insurance becomes new jersey sponsor; jersey remains unchanged other than the addition of the name of the sponsor.
- 2013–2014: Farmers Insurance naming rights expire, and the team name returns on both jerseys. In addition a modified font for the jersey numbers was introduced.
- 2011–2012: As part of the move to Adidas's Revolution 30 technology, the Sparks unveiled new jerseys. Home uniforms remain gold, but numbers are now rounded and in white with purple trim. Away uniforms are purple with numbers in white with gold trim. The Farmers Insurance name will remain on the jerseys.
- 2009–2010: On June 5, the Los Angeles Sparks and Farmers Insurance Group of Companies announced a multi-year marketing partnership that includes a branded jersey sponsorship. The Farmers Insurance branded jersey was worn by the players for the first time on June 6, 2009. As part of this alliance, the Farmers Insurance name and logo will appear on the front of the Sparks jerseys. In the 2009 season, the Sparks yellow jersey is used regardless of home or away. In the 2010 season they introduced the purple jersey for away games.
- 2007–2008: For home games, gold with purple lines and sparks on the side, with the name "Sparks" written across in purple. For away games, purple with golden yellow lines and sparks on the side, with the name "Los Angeles" in yellow. The uniform looks similar to the Los Angeles Lakers' uniform.
- 1997–2006: For home games, gold with large purple stripe on the side, with the name "Sparks" written across in purple. For away games, purple with large gold stripe on the side, with the name "Los Angeles" in yellow.

== Season-by-season records ==
WNBA champions	Conference champions	Playoff berth

Season	Team	Conference		Regular season			Playoff Results	Awards	Head coach
Season	Team	Conference		W	L	Win %	Playoff Results	Awards	Head coach
Los Angeles Sparks
1997	1997	West	2nd	14	14	.500	Did not qualify	Zheng Haixia (KPSA)	L. Sharp (4–7); J. Rousseau (10–7)
1998	1998	West	3rd	12	18	.400	Did not qualify		J. Rousseau (7–13); O. Woolridge (5–5)
1999	1999	West	2nd	20	12	.625	Won Conference Semifinals (Sacramento, 1–0); Lost Conference Finals (Houston, 1–2)	Lisa Leslie (AMVP)	Orlando Woolridge
2000	2000	West	1st	28	4	.875	Won Conference Semifinals (Phoenix, 2–0); Lost Conference Finals (Houston, 0–2)	Michael Cooper (COY)	Michael Cooper
2001	2001	West	1st	28	4	.875	Won Conference Semifinals (Houston, 2–0); Won Conference Finals (Sacramento, 2–1); Won WNBA Finals (Charlotte, 2–0)	Lisa Leslie (AMVP); Lisa Leslie (MVP); Lisa Leslie (FMVP)	Michael Cooper
2002	2002	West	1st	25	7	.781	Won Conference Semifinals (Seattle, 2–0); Won Conference Finals (Utah, 2–0); Won WNBA Finals (New York, 2–0)	Lisa Leslie (AMVP); Lisa Leslie (FMVP)	Michael Cooper
2003	2003	West	1st	24	10	.706	Won Conference Semifinals (Minnesota, 2–1); Won Conference Finals (Sacramento, 2–1); Lost WNBA Finals (Detroit, 1–2)	Nikki Teasley (AMVP)	Michael Cooper
2004	2004	West	1st	25	9	.735	Lost Conference Semifinals (Sacramento, 1–2)	Lisa Leslie (MVP); Lisa Leslie (DPOY)	M. Cooper (14–6); K. Thompson (11–3)
2005	2005	West	4th	17	17	.500	Lost Conference Semifinals (Sacramento, 0–2)		H. Bibby (13–15); J. Bryant (4–2)
2006	2006	West	1st	25	9	.735	Won Conference Semifinals (Seattle, 2–1); Lost Conference Finals (Sacramento, 0–2)	Lisa Leslie (MVP)	Joe Bryant
2007	2007	West	7th	10	24	.294	Did not qualify		Michael Cooper
2008	2008	West	3rd	20	14	.588	Won Conference Semifinals (Seattle, 2–1); Lost Conference Finals (San Antonio, 1–2)	Candace Parker (MVP); Candace Parker (ROY); Lisa Leslie (DPOY)	Michael Cooper
2009	2009	West	3rd	18	16	.529	Won Conference Semifinals (Seattle, 2–1); Lost Conference Finals (Phoenix, 1–2)		Michael Cooper
2010	2010	West	4th	13	21	.382	Lost Conference Semifinals (Seattle, 0–2)		Jennifer Gillom
2011	2011	West	5th	15	19	.441	Did not qualify		J. Gillom (4–6); J. Bryant (11–13)
2012	2012	West	2nd	24	10	.706	Won Conference Semifinals (San Antonio, 2–0); Lost Conference Finals (Minnesota, 0–2)	Nneka Ogwumike (ROY); Kristi Toliver (MIP); Carol Ross (COY)	Carol Ross
2013	2013	West	2nd	24	10	.706	Lost Conference Semifinals (Phoenix, 1–2)	Candace Parker (MVP)	Carol Ross
2014	2014	West	4th	16	18	.471	Lost Conference Semifinals (Phoenix, 0–2)		C. Ross (10–12); P. Toler (6–6)
2015	2015	West	4th	14	20	.412	Lost Conference Semifinals (Minnesota, 1–2)		Brian Agler
2016	2016	West	2nd	26	8	.765	Won WNBA Semifinals (Chicago, 3–1); Won WNBA Finals (Minnesota, 3–2)	Jantel Lavender (SIX); Nneka Ogwumike (MVP); Candace Parker (FMVP)	Brian Agler
2017	2017	West	2nd	26	8	.765	Won WNBA Semifinals (Phoenix, 3–0); Lost WNBA Finals (Minnesota, 2–3)	Alana Beard (DPOY)	Brian Agler
2018	2018	West	3rd	19	15	.559	Won First Round (Minnesota, 1–0); Lost Second Round (Washington, 0–1)	Alana Beard (DPOY)	Brian Agler
2019	2019	West	1st	22	12	.647	Won Second Round (Seattle, 1–0); Lost WNBA Semifinals (Connecticut, 0–3)	Nneka Ogwumike (KPSA)	Derek Fisher
2020	2020	West	3rd	15	7	.682	Lost Second Round (Connecticut, 0–1)	Candace Parker (DPOY); Nneka Ogwumike (KPSA)	Derek Fisher
2021	2021	West	6th	12	20	.375	Did not qualify	Nneka Ogwumike (KPSA)	Derek Fisher
2022	2022	West	6th	13	23	.361	Did not qualify		Derek Fisher (5–7); Fred Williams (8–16)
2023	2023	West	4th	17	23	.425	Did not qualify		Curt Miller
2024	2024	West	6th	8	32	.200	Did not qualify	Dearica Hamby (KPSA)	Curt Miller
2025	2025	West	6th	21	23	.477	Did not qualify		Lynne Roberts
2026	2026	West	7th	16	28	.364	Did not qualify	Nneka Ogwumike (KPSA)	Lynne Roberts
Regular season				567	455	.555	3 Conference Championships		
Playoffs				47	43	.522	3 WNBA Championships		

== Players ==
=== Current roster ===
Current injuries are not updated.

Los Angeles Sparks roster
Players
Coaches

Pos.	No.	Nat.	Name	Height	Weight	DOB	From	Yrs
G	1	(Cameroon)	Akoa Makani, Monique	5' 11" (1.8m)		2001-02-04	Cameroon	1
G	7	(United States)	Atkins, Ariel	5' 8" (1.73m)	167 lb (76kg)	1996-07-30	Texas	8
F	22	(United States)	Brink, Cameron	6' 4" (1.93m)	170 lb (77kg)	2001-12-31	Stanford	2
G/F	12	(United States)	Burrell, Rae	6' 2" (1.88m)	168 lb (76kg)	2000-06-21	Tennessee	3
F	32	(United States)	Cannon, Emma	6' 2" (1.88m)	190 lb (86kg)	1989-06-01	Florida Southern	6
G	2	(United States)	Gray, Chance	5' 9" (1.75m)		2004-07-06	Ohio State	R
F	5	(United States)	Hamby, Dearica	6' 3" (1.91m)	189 lb (86kg)	1993-11-06	Wake Forest	10
G	4	(United States)	Morgan, Tonie			2004-07-16	Kentucky	R
G	-	(United States)	Mwenentanda, Ndjakalenga	6' 2" (1.88m)		2003-11-24	Vanderbilt	R
G/F	-	(United States)	Nye, Aaliyah	6' 0" (1.83m)		2002-08-14	Alabama	1
F	30	(United States)	Ogwumike, Nneka	6' 2" (1.88m)	190 lb (86kg)	1990-07-02	Stanford	13
G	6	(South Korea)	Park, Ji-hyun	6' 1" (1.85m)		2000-04-07	Soongeui Girls' High School (Seoul, South Korea)	R
G	–	(United States)	Sellers, Shyanne	6' 2" (1.88m)		2003-04-24	Maryland	R
G	17	(United States)	Wheeler, Erica	5' 7" (1.7m)	143 lb (65kg)	1991-05-02	Rutgers	9

Assistant coaches
(United States) Zak Buncik (UT Arlington)
(United States) Ebony Hoffman (USC)
(United States) Zach O'Brien (St. Joseph's College of Maine)
Athletic trainer
(United States) Karissa Scherer
(United States) Tavon Spears

Legend

- (C) Team captain
- (DP) Unsigned draft pick
- (FA) Free agent
- (S) Suspended
- Injured

WNBA roster page

East
ATL
CHI
CON
IND
NY
TOR
WAS
West
DAL
GS
LV
LA
MIN
PHO
POR
SEA

=== Other rights owned ===
Nationality	Name	Years pro	Last played	Drafted
(Ukraine)	Alina Iagupova	0	N/A	N/A
(Russia)	Maria Vadeeva	2	2019	2018
(Czech Republic)	Julia Reisingerová	0	N/A	2018

=== Retired numbers ===
Los Angeles Sparks retired numbers
No.	Player	Position	Tenure	Ref.
3	Candace Parker	F	2008–2020	
9	Lisa Leslie	C	1997–2009	
11	Penny Toler	G	1997–1999	

=== FIBA Hall of Fame ===
Los Angeles Sparks Hall of Famers
Players
No.	Name	Position	Tenure	Inducted
12	Margo Dydek	C	2008	2019
28	Zheng Haixia	C	1997–1998	2021

== Coaches and staff ==
=== Owners ===
- Jerry Buss, owner of the Los Angeles Lakers (1997–2006)
- Gemini Basketball LLC, composed of Carla Christofferson, Kathy Goodman, and Lynai Jones (2006–2011)
- Williams Group Holdings (Paula Madison) (2011–2014) and Carla Christofferson, Kathy Goodman, and Lisa Leslie (2011–2013)
- Sparks LA Sports (Mark Walter, Magic Johnson, Stan Kasten, Todd Boehly, Bobby Patton, Eric Holoman) (2014–present)

=== Head coaches ===
Los Angeles Sparks head coaches
Name	Start	End	Seasons	Regular season				Playoffs			
Name	Start	End	Seasons	W	L	Win %	G	W	L	Win %	G
Linda Sharp	Beginning of 1997	July 16, 1997	1	4	7	.364	11	0	0	.000	0
Julie Rousseau	July 16, 1997	July 30, 1998	2	17	20	.459	37	0	0	.000	0
Orlando Woolridge	July 30, 1998	October 2, 1999	2	25	17	.595	42	2	2	.500	4
Michael Cooper	October 14, 1999	July 18, 2004	5	119	31	.793	150	19	7	.731	26
Karleen Thompson	July 18, 2004	End of 2004	1	11	3	.786	14	1	2	.333	3
Ryan Weisenberg	July 18, 2004	End of 2004	1	11	3	.786	14	1	2	.333	3
Henry Bibby	April 7, 2005	August 22, 2005	1	13	15	.464	29	0	0	.000	0
Joe Bryant	August 22, 2005	April 4, 2007	2	29	11	.725	39	2	5	.286	7
Michael Cooper	April 4, 2007	End of 2009	3	48	54	.471	102	6	6	.500	12
Michael Cooper	Total		8	167	85	.663	252	25	13	.658	38
Jennifer Gillom	December 14, 2009	July 11, 2011	2	17	27	.386	44	0	2	.000	2
Joe Bryant	July 11, 2011	January 5, 2012	1	11	13	.458	24	0	0	.000	0
Joe Bryant	Total		3	40	24	.625	63	2	5	.286	7
Carol Ross	January 5, 2012	July 20, 2014	3	58	32	.644	90	3	4	.429	7
Penny Toler	July 20, 2014	End of 2014	1	6	6	.500	12	0	2	.000	2
Brian Agler	January 5, 2015	November 1, 2018	4	85	51	.625	136	13	9	.591	22
Derek Fisher	December 5, 2018	June 7, 2022	4	54	46	.540	100	1	4	.200	5
Fred Williams	June 7, 2022	August 17, 2022	1	8	16	.333	24	0	0	.000	0
Curt Miller	October 21, 2022	September 24, 2024	2	25	55	.313	80	0	0	.000	0
Lynne Roberts	November 19, 2024	September 25, 2026	1	21	23	.477	44	0	0	.000	0

=== General Managers ===
- Rhonda Windham (1997–1999)
- Penny Toler (2000–2019)
- Derek Fisher (2021–2022)
- Karen Bryant (2023)
- Raegan Pebley (2024–2026)
- Ariana Andonian (2026–present)

=== Assistant coaches ===
- Julie Rousseau (1997)
- Orlando Woolridge (1998)
- Michael Cooper (1999)
- Marianne Stanley (2000, 2008–2009)
- Glenn McDonald (2000–2002)
- Karleen Thompson (2002–2004)
- Ryan Weisenberg (2003–2004)
- Bob Webb (2005)
- Shelley Patterson (2005)
- Michael Abraham (2006–2007)
- Margaret Mohr (2006–2007)
- Laura Beeman (2008–2009)
- Larry Smith (2008)
- Steve Smith (1998, 2009–2010, 2014, 2023)
- Sandy Brondello (2011–2013)
- Joe Bryant (2011)
- Jim Lewis (2012)
- Bridget Pettis (2013)
- Gail Goestenkors (2014)
- Gary Kloppenburg (2014)
- Curt Miller (2015)
- Amber Stocks (2015–2016)
- Tonya Edwards (2016–2018)
- Bobbie Kelsey (2017–2018)
- Latricia Trammell (2019–2022)
- Fred Williams (2019–2022)
- Seimone Augustus (2021–2022)
- Chris Koclanes (2023)
- Danielle Viglione (2023)
- Neil Harrow (2024)
- Nola Henry (2024)
- Camille Little (2024)
- Nikki Blue (2025)
- Danielle Robinson (2025–present)
- Zak Buncik (2025–present)
- Mike Neighbors (2025–present)

== Statistics ==
Los Angeles Sparks statistics
1990s

Season	Individual			Team vs Opponents		
Season	PPG	RPG	APG	PPG	RPG	FG%
1997	L. Leslie (15.9)	L. Leslie (9.5)	P. Toler (5.1)	74.0 vs 71.8	34.8 vs 32.9	.446 vs .397
1998	L. Leslie (19.6)	L. Leslie (10.2)	P. Toler (4.8)	71.6 vs 72.3	34.0 vs 33.3	.416 vs .411
1999	L. Leslie (15.6)	L. Leslie (7.8)	M. Mabika (3.5)	76.5 vs 72.4	33.3 vs 32.2	.435 vs .410

2000s

Season	Individual			Team vs Opponents		
Season	PPG	RPG	APG	PPG	RPG	FG%
2000	L. Leslie (17.8)	L. Leslie (9.6)	U. Figgs (4.0)	75.5 vs 67.8	34.1 vs 30.6	.440 vs .395
2001	L. Leslie (19.5)	L. Leslie (9.6)	U. Figgs (3.9)	76.3 vs 67.7	34.5 vs 28.8	.451 vs .392
2002	L. Leslie (16.9)	L. Leslie (10.4)	N. Teasley (4.4)	76.6 vs 69.8	35.7 vs 30.0	.445 vs .390
2003	L. Leslie (18.4)	L. Leslie (10.0)	N. Teasley (6.3)	73.5 vs 71.5	33.8 vs 32.5	.418 vs .403
2004	L. Leslie (17.6)	L. Leslie (9.9)	N. Teasley (6.1)	73.4 vs 69.4	33.0 vs 31.4	.437 vs .389
2005	C. Holdsclaw (17.0)	L. Leslie (7.3)	N. Teasley (3.7)	68.4 vs 69.0	29.5 vs 30.6	.428 vs .418
2006	L. Leslie (20.0)	L. Leslie (9.5)	T. Johnson (5.0)	75.7 vs 72.8	35.4 vs 31.8	.438 vs .400
2007	T. McWilliams (11.1)	T. McWilliams (5.9)	S. Baker (3.2)	74.5 vs 79.6	33.5 vs 34.7	.408 vs .431
2008	C. Parker (18.5)	C. Parker (9.5)	S. Bobbitt (3.5)	76.4 vs 74.2	37.7 vs 33.1	.424 vs .384
2009	L. Leslie (15.4)	C. Parker (9.8)	N. Quinn (3.5)	74.5 vs 73.5	36.7 vs 30.9	.430 vs .399

2010s

Season	Individual			Team vs Opponents		
Season	PPG	RPG	APG	PPG	RPG	FG%
2010	T. Thompson (16.6)	T. Thompson (6.2)	T. Penicheiro (6.9)	77.9 vs 81.2	30.8 vs 35.3	.441 vs .441
2011	C. Parker (18.5)	C. Parker (8.6)	T. Penicheiro (4.8)	77.1 vs 80.3	31.7 vs 34.8	.445 vs .447
2012	K. Toliver (17.5)	C. Parker (9.7)	K. Toliver (4.9)	84.0 vs 78.3	36.9 vs 33.6	.458 vs .416
2013	C. Parker (17.9)	C. Parker (8.7)	L. Harding (5.2)	81.9 vs 75.0	34.6 vs 33.6	.475 vs .412
2014	C. Parker (19.4)	C. Parker; N. Ogwumike (7.1)	C. Parker (4.3)	77.4 vs 77.6	32.4 vs 33.6	.457 vs .450
2015	C. Parker (19.4)	C. Parker (10.1)	C. Parker (6.3)	73.6 vs 74.6	32.1 vs 32.9	.452 vs .415
2016	N. Ogwumike (19.7)	N. Ogwumike (9.1)	C. Parker (4.9)	83.0 vs 75.9	31.5 vs 32.4	.487 vs .433
2017	N. Ogwumike (18.8)	C. Parker (8.4)	C. Gray (4.4)	83.5 vs 75.2	31.4 vs 31.9	.479 vs .430
2018	C. Parker (17.9)	C. Parker (8.2)	C. Gray (5.1)	78.9 vs 77.0	31.3 vs 35.1	.452 vs .450
2019	N. Ogwumike (16.1)	N. Ogwumike (8.8)	C. Gray (5.9)	80.1 vs 77.2	34.2 vs 36.3	.432 vs .408

2020s

Season	Individual			Team vs Opponents		
Season	PPG	RPG	APG	PPG	RPG	FG%
2020	C. Parker (14.7)	C. Parker (9.7)	C. Gray (5.3)	84.9 vs 80.3	31.4 vs 34.1	.481 vs .449
2021	N. Ogwumike (14.5)	N. Ogwumike (6.5)	E. Wheeler (4.8)	72.8 vs 77.1	29.2 vs 38.3	.411 vs .419
2022	N. Ogwumike (18.1)	N. Ogwumike (6.6)	J. Canada (5.5)	79.4 vs 86.6	30.4 vs 35.2	.446 vs .467
2023	N. Ogwumike (19.1)	N. Ogwumike (8.8)	J. Canada (6.0)	78.9 vs 80.5	31.5 vs 35.0	.425 vs .457
2024	D. Hamby (17.3)	D. Hamby (9.2)	O. Sims (5.1)	78.4 vs 85.6	32.7 vs 34.0	.423 vs .464
2025	K. Plum (19.5)	A. Stevens (8.0)	K. Plum (5.7)	85.7 vs 88.2	33.3 vs 34.2	.457 vs .453

== Media coverage ==
Currently, some Sparks games are broadcast on Spectrum SportsNet, a local television channel in the Southern California area, after agreeing to a multi-year broadcast deal with Time Warner Cable in March 2012 which was later acquired by Charter Communications in May 2016. Broadcasters for the Sparks games are Larry Burnett and Lisa Leslie. Previously, Sparks games were found on Fox Sports West and Prime Ticket and former analysts have included Derek Fisher and Ann Meyers.

Some Sparks games are broadcast nationally on ESPN, ESPN2, Ion Television (KPXN-TV), CBS (KCBS-TV), ABC (KABC-TV), NBC (KNBC), Amazon Prime Video, USA, NBCSN, and NBA TV.

Currently, the team's games are not on radio; however, the team did bounce around several stations from 1999 to 2008. The first two years had no broadcasts. Then in 1999, the team signed with KWKU, a sister station to Spanish-language KWKW, licensed to Pomona, California. According to an article in the Los Angeles Times published in this period, KWKU had no switchboard and no website. In addition, its 500-watt signal reached only a handful of people in the greater L.A. area and was certainly nowhere near the team's home arenas. In 2003, the team left KWKU for KLAC, which had summer time slots available after the Anaheim Angels' radio broadcasts had just left. That lasted until 2006, when KLAC switched the broadcasts to XETRA, which carried the same format KLAC had before. In 2007, the game broadcasts moved again, this time to KTLK, when XETRA switched its language of broadcasts from English to Spanish. The Sparks and Clear Channel Communications (licensee of the last three stations mentioned) chose not to renew their contract after 2008. Sparks radio broadcasts never covered a complete season; most nationally-televised games and many games from the Eastern time zone were not covered. Burnett was the announcer.

== All-time notes ==
=== Regular season attendance ===
- A sellout for a basketball game at The Forum (1997–2000) is 17,505.
- A sellout for a basketball game at Crypto.com Arena (formerly Staples Center) (2001–present) is 19,079.

Regular season all-time attendance
Year	Average	High	Low	Sellouts	Total for year	WNBA game average
1997	8,937 (4th)	14,457	5,987	0	125,114	9,669
1998	7,653 (9th)	11,191	4,851	0	114,801	10,869
1999	7,625 (10th)	13,116	5,436	0	122,000	10,207
2000	6,563 (14th)	11,378	4,416	0	105,005	9,074
2001	9,278 (4th)	11,819	6,591	0	148,446	9,075
2002	11,651 (3rd)	18,542	7,487	0	186,410	9,228
2003	9,290 (4th)	11,320	6,710	0	157,934	8,800
2004	10,369 (2nd)	18,997	8,368	0	176,269	8,613
2005	8,839 (5th)	17,769	7,246	0	143,211	8,172
2006	8,312 (5th)	12,289	6,670	0	141,312	7,476
2007	8,695 (3rd)	13,092	6,748	0	147,810	7,742
2008	9,429 (2nd)	13,142	7,245	0	161,369	7,948
2009	10,387 (2nd)	13,865	8,263	0	176,587	8,039
2010	9,468 (2nd)	14,413	6,026	0	160,951	7,834
2011	10,316 (2nd)	14,266	7,522	0	175,366	7,954
2012	10,089 (1st)	12,639	8,312	0	171,511	7,452
2013	9,869 (1st)	12,651	6,110	0	167,773	7,531
2014	8,288 (5th)	10,138	5,317	0	140,901	7,578
2015	7,464 (6th)	19,076	4,344	0	126,895	7,184
2016	9,638 (3rd)	19,076	6,152	0	163,839	7,655
2017	11,350 (1st)	19,282	7,233	1	192,957	7,713
2018	10,642 (1st)	19,076	6,280	0	180,910	6,721
2019	11,306 (1st)	17,076	8,816	0	192,204	6,535
2020	Due to the COVID-19 pandemic, the season was played in Bradenton, Florida without fans.					
2021	1,221 (11th)	4,181	301	0	18,319	2,636
2022	5,653 (6th)	10,021	4,834	0	101,747	5,679
2023	6,554 (7th)	11,970 (Note: The Sparks played two 2023 home games at Galen Center.)	3,469	0	131,070	6,615
2024	11,045 (5th)	19,103	3,627 (Note: The Sparks played two 2024 home games at Walter Pyramid at Long Beach State.)	1	220,897	9,807
2025	12,441 (4th)	18,199	10,581	0	273,709	10,986

=== Draft picks ===
- 1997 Elite Draft: Daedra Charles (8), Haixia Zheng (16)
- 1997: Jamila Wideman (3), Tamecka Dixon (14), Katrina Colleton (19), Travesa Gant (30)
- 1998: Allison Feaster (5), Octavia Blue (15), Rehema Stephens (25), Erica Kienast (35)
- 1999: Delisha Milton (4), Clarisse Machanguana (16), Ukari Figgs (28), La'Keshia Frett (40)
- 2000: Nicole Kubik (15), Paige Sauer (31), Marte Alexander (47), Nicky McCrimmon (63)
- 2001: Camille Cooper (16), Nicole Levandusky (32), Kelley Siemon (48), Beth Record (64)
- 2002: Rosalind Ross (16), Gergana Slavtcheva (30), Jackie Higgins (32), Rashana Barnes (48), Tiffany Thompson (64)
- 2003 Miami/Portland Dispersal Draft: Jackie Stiles (14)
- 2003: Schuye LaRue (27), Mary Jo Noon (42)
- 2004 Cleveland Dispersal Draft: Isabelle Fijalkowski (12)
- 2004: Christi Thomas (12), Doneeka Hodges (25)
- 2005: DeeDee Wheeler (26), Heather Schreiber (39)
- 2006: Lisa Willis (5), Willnett Crockett (22), Tiffany Porter-Talbert (36)
- 2007 Charlotte Dispersal Draft: Ayana Walker (12)
- 2007: Sidney Spencer (25), Amanda Brown (38)
- 2008: Candace Parker (1), Shannon Bobbitt (15), Sharnee Zoll (29)
- 2008 Houston Dispersal Draft: selection waived
- 2009: Lindsay Wisdom-Hylton (13), Ashley Paris (22), Britney Jordan (35)
- 2009 Sacramento Dispersal Draft: selection waived
- 2010: Bianca Thomas (12), Angel Robinson (20), Rashidat Junaid (32)
- 2011: Jantel Lavender (5), Elina Babkina (29, ineligible)
- 2012: Nneka Ogwumike (1), Farhiya Abdi (13), Khadijah Rushdan (15), Tyra White (16), April Sykes (28)
- 2013: A'dia Mathies (10), Brittany Chambers (22)
- 2014: Jennifer Hamson (23), Antonita Slaughter (35)
- 2015: Crystal Bradford (7), Cierra Burdick (14), Andrea Hoover (31)
- 2016: Jonquel Jones (6), Whitney Knight (15), Brianna Butler (23), Talia Walton (29)
- 2017: Sydney Weise (11), Saicha Grant-Allen (35)
- 2018: Maria Vadeeva (11), Shakayla Thomas (23), Julia Reisingerová (35)
- 2019: Kalani Brown (7), Marina Mabrey (19), Ángela Salvadores (31)
- 2020: Beatrice Mompremier (20), Leonie Fiebich (22), Tynice Martin (34)
- 2021: Jasmine Walker (7), Stephanie Watts (10), Arella Guirantes (22), Ivana Raca (28), Aina Ayuso (34)
- 2022: Rae Burrell (9), Kianna Smith (16), Olivia Nelson-Ododa (19), Amy Atwell (27)
- 2023: Zia Cooke (10), Shaneice Swain (14), Monika Czinano (26)
- 2024: Cameron Brink (2), Rickea Jackson (4), McKenzie Forbes (28)
- 2025: Sarah Ashlee Barker (9), Sania Feagin (21), Liatu King (28)
- 2026: Ta'Niya Latson (20), Chance Gray (24), Amelia Hassett (35)

=== All-Stars ===
- 1997: No All-Star Game
- 1998: No All-Star Game
- 1999: Lisa Leslie
- 2000: Lisa Leslie, Mwadi Mabika, Delisha Milton
- 2001: Tamecka Dixon, Lisa Leslie
- 2002: Tamecka Dixon, Lisa Leslie, Mwadi Mabika
- 2003: Tamecka Dixon, Lisa Leslie, Nikki Teasley
- 2004: Mwadi Mabika, Nikki Teasley
- 2005: Chamique Holdsclaw, Lisa Leslie
- 2006: Lisa Leslie
- 2007: Taj McWilliams-Franklin
- 2008: No All-Star Game
- 2009: Lisa Leslie, Tina Thompson
- 2010: Candace Parker
- 2011: Candace Parker
- 2012: No All-Star Game
- 2013: Nneka Ogwumike, Candace Parker, Kristi Toliver
- 2014: Nneka Ogwumike, Candace Parker
- 2015: Jantel Lavender, Nneka Ogwumike
- 2016: No All-Star Game
- 2017: Chelsea Gray, Nneka Ogwumike, Candace Parker
- 2018: Chelsea Gray, Candace Parker
- 2019: Chelsea Gray, Nneka Ogwumike
- 2020: No All-Star Game
- 2021: No All-Star Game
- 2022: Nneka Ogwumike
- 2023: Nneka Ogwumike
- 2024: Dearica Hamby
- 2025: Kelsey Plum
- 2026: Kelsey Plum

=== Olympians ===
- 2000: Lisa Leslie, Delisha Milton
- 2004: Lisa Leslie
- 2008: Lisa Leslie, Candace Parker, Delisha Milton-Jones
- 2012: Candace Parker, Jenna O'Hea (AUS)
- 2016: Ana Dabovic (SER)
- 2020: None
- 2024: Dearica Hamby (USA 3x3), Kia Nurse (CAN), Stephanie Talbot (AUS), Li Yueru (CHN)

=== Honors and awards ===
- 1997 All-WNBA First Team: Lisa Leslie
- 1997 Sportsmanship Award: Haixia Zheng
- 1998 All-WNBA Second Team: Lisa Leslie
- 1999 All-WNBA Second Team: Lisa Leslie
- 1999 All-Star Game MVP: Lisa Leslie
- 2000 All-WNBA First Team: Lisa Leslie
- 2000 Coach of the Year: Michael Cooper
- 2001 Most Valuable Player: Lisa Leslie
- 2001 Finals MVP: Lisa Leslie
- 2001 All-WNBA First Team: Lisa Leslie
- 2001 All-WNBA Second Team: Tamecka Dixon
- 2001 All-Star Game MVP: Lisa Leslie
- 2001 Peak Performer (FG%): Latasha Byears
- 2002 All-WNBA First Team: Lisa Leslie
- 2002 All-WNBA First Team: Mwadi Mabika
- 2002 Finals MVP: Lisa Leslie
- 2002 All-Star Game MVP: Lisa Leslie
- 2003 All-WNBA First Team: Lisa Leslie
- 2003 All-WNBA Second Team: Nikki Teasley
- 2003 All-Star Game MVP: Nikki Teasley
- 2004 Most Valuable Player: Lisa Leslie
- 2004 All-WNBA First Team: Lisa Leslie
- 2004 All-WNBA Second Team: Nikki Teasley
- 2004 Defensive Player of the Year: Lisa Leslie
- 2004 Peak Performer (Rebounds): Lisa Leslie
- 2005 All-WNBA Second Team: Lisa Leslie
- 2005 All-Defensive Second Team: Lisa Leslie
- 2006 Most Valuable Player: Lisa Leslie
- 2006 All-Decade Team: Lisa Leslie
- 2006 All-WNBA First Team: Lisa Leslie
- 2006 All-Defensive First Team: Lisa Leslie
- 2007 All-Rookie Team: Marta Fernandez
- 2007 All-Rookie Team: Sidney Spencer
- 2008 Most Valuable Player: Candace Parker
- 2008 Rookie of the Year: Candace Parker
- 2008 All-WNBA First Team: Lisa Leslie
- 2008 All-WNBA First Team: Candace Parker
- 2008 Defensive Player of the Year: Lisa Leslie
- 2008 All-Defensive First Team: Lisa Leslie
- 2008 All-Rookie Team: Candace Parker
- 2008 Peak Performer (Rebounds): Candace Parker
- 2009 All-WNBA Second Team: Lisa Leslie
- 2009 All-WNBA Second Team: Candace Parker
- 2009 All-Defensive Second Team: Lisa Leslie
- 2009 All-Defensive Second Team: Candace Parker
- 2009 Peak Performer (Rebounds): Candace Parker
- 2010 Peak Performer (Assists): Ticha Penicheiro
- 2012 Rookie of the Year: Nneka Ogwumike
- 2012 Most Improved Player: Kristi Toliver
- 2012 Coach of the Year: Carol Ross
- 2012 All-WNBA First Team: Candace Parker
- 2012 All-Defensive First Team: Alana Beard
- 2012 All-Defensive Second Team: Candace Parker
- 2012 All-Rookie Team: Nneka Ogwumike
- 2013 Most Valuable Player: Candace Parker
- 2013 All-WNBA First Team: Candace Parker
- 2014 All-WNBA First Team: Candace Parker
- 2014 All-WNBA Second Team: Nneka Ogwumike
- 2014 All-Defensive Second Team: Alana Beard
- 2015 All-Rookie Team: Ana Dabović
- 2015 All-Defensive First Team: Nneka Ogwumike
- 2015 All-WNBA Second Team: Candace Parker
- 2016 Finals MVP: Candace Parker
- 2016 Most Valuable Player: Nneka Ogwumike
- 2016 Sixth Woman of the Year: Jantel Lavender
- 2016 All-Defensive First Team: Alana Beard
- 2016 All-Defensive First Team: Nneka Ogwumike
- 2017 Defensive Player of the Year: Alana Beard
- 2017 All-WNBA Second Team: Chelsea Gray, Nneka Ogwumike
- 2018 Defensive Player of the Year: Alana Beard
- 2018 All-WNBA Second Team: Candace Parker
- 2019 Kim Perrot Sportsmanship Award: Nneka Ogwumike
- 2019 All-WNBA First Team: Chelsea Gray
- 2019 All-WNBA Second Team: Nneka Ogwumike
- 2019 All-Defensive First Team: Nneka Ogwumike
- 2020 Defensive Player of the Year: Candace Parker
- 2020 Peak Performer (Rebounds): Candace Parker
- 2020 All-Defensive Second Team: Brittney Sykes
- 2020 All-WNBA First Team: Candace Parker
- 2021 All-Defensive First Team: Brittney Sykes
- 2022 All-Defensive Second Team: Brittney Sykes
- 2022 All-WNBA Second Team: Nneka Ogwumike
- 2023 All-Defensive First Team: Jordin Canada
- 2023 All-Defensive Second Team: Nneka Ogwumike
- 2023 All-WNBA Second Team: Nneka Ogwumike
- 2024 Kim Perrot Sportsmanship Award: Dearica Hamby

Sporting positions
Preceded by Houston Comets	WNBA Champions; 2001 (First title); 2002 (Second title); 2016 (Third title)	Succeeded by Minnesota Lynx
Preceded by Houston Comets	WNBA Western Conference Champions; 2001 (First title); 2002 (Second title); 2003 (Third title); 2016 (Fourth title)	Succeeded by Conference Titles no longer awarded
