= List of WNBA players =

The following is a list of Women's National Basketball Association (WNBA) players.

== A ==
- (Sweden) (Somalia) Farhiya Abdi
- (Saint Croix) Tajama Abraham
- (Russia) Svetlana Abrosimova
- (Canada) Natalie Achonwa
- (United States) Jessica Adair
- (United States) Danielle Adams
- (Canada) Jordan Adams
- (Spain) Elisa Aguilar
- (Liberia) Matee Ajavon
- (Cameroon) Monique Akoa Makani
- (United States) Bella Alarie
- (United States) Marcie Alberts
- (United States) Markita Aldridge
- (United States) Erin Alexander
- (Canada) Kayla Alexander
- (United States) Tawona Alhaleem
- (Belgium) Julie Allemand
- (United States) Charel Allen
- (Australia) Rebecca Allen
- (United States) Ameryst Alston
- (Nigeria) Mactabene Amachree
- (United States) Monique Ambers
- (Canada) Laeticia Amihere
- (Australia) Georgia Amoore
- (United States) Ambrosia Anderson
- (United States) Chantelle Anderson
- (United States) Jolene Anderson
- (United States) Keisha Anderson
- (Cape Verde) Mery Andrade
- (United States) Yvette Angel
- (France) Nell Angloma
- (United States) (United Kingdom) Kristine Anigwe
- (United States) Nicky Anosike
- (United States) Jayne Appel
- (Brazil) Janeth Arcain
- (United States) Anne Marie Armstrong
- (United States) Katasha Artis
- (Germany) Marlies Askamp
- (Italy) Pauline Astier
- (United States) Ariel Atkins
- (United States) La'Tangela Atkinson
- (United States) Morenike Atunrase
- (Australia) Amy Atwell
- (United States) Seimone Augustus
- (United States) Shakira Austin
- (France) Valériane Ayayi
- (United States) Angela Aycock
- (Canada) Miranda Ayim
- (United States) Leigh Aziz
- (United States) Jennifer Azzi

== B ==
- Tricia Bader Binford
- Sherill Baker
- Alison Bales
- Rhonda Banchero
- Rachel Banham
- (France) Ornella Bankole
- Elena Baranova
- Sarah Ashlee Barker
- LaQuanda Barksdale
- Adia Barnes
- April Barnes
- Quacy Barnes
- Mistie Bass
- (Australia) Suzy Batkovic-Brown
- Jacqueline Batteast
- Ashley Battle
- Cass Bauer-Bilodeau
- Vicki Baugh
- Alana Beard
- Ryneldi Becenti
- Kimberly Beck
- Raegan Beers
- Kenisha Bell
- Kierstan Bell
- Evgeniya Belyakova
- (Belgium) Hind Ben Abdelkader
- Jenni Benningfield
- Alex Bentley
- Valeriya Berezhynska
- Grace Berger
- Lucienne Berthieu
- Morgan Bertsch
- Lauren Betts
- (Australia) Tully Bevilaqua
- Tiffany Bias
- (Australia) Chloe Bibby
- (Australia) Jessica Bibby
- Agnieszka Bibrzycka
- Monique Billings
- Sue Bird
- (Australia) Abby Bishop
- Nina Bjedov
- Angie Bjorklund
- Tera Bjorklund
- Chante Black
- Debbie Black
- Rhonda Blades
- Cindy Blodgett
- Nikki Blue
- Octavia Blue
- Shannon Bobbitt
- Whitney Boddie
- Ruthie Bolton
- LaToya Bond
- Kelsey Bone
- Susanna Bonfiglio
- DeWanna Bonner
- (France) Isobel Borlase
- Karen Booker
- Aliyah Boston
- Jenny Boucek
- Kelly Boucher
- Lindsay Bowen
- Brittany Boyd
- (Australia) Carla Boyd
- Crystal Bradford
- Gennifer Brandon
- Albena Branzova
- Gergana Branzova
- Cierra Bravard
- Janice Braxton
- Kara Braxton
- Angie Braziel
- Jessica Breland
- Cameron Brink
- Reshea Bristol
- (France) Noémie Brochant
- Nia Brodie
- (Australia) Michelle Brogan
- (Australia) Sandy Brondello
- Cindy Brown
- Coretta Brown
- Edwina Brown
- Jaelyn Brown
- Kalani Brown
- Kiesha Brown
- La'Shawn Brown
- Leigha Brown
- Lesley Brown
- Rushia Brown
- Marla Brumfield
- Jessica Brungo
- Rebekkah Brunson
- Paige Bueckers
- (Germany) Frieda Bühner
- Adut Bulgak
- Vicky Bullett
- Cierra Burdick
- Rae Burrell
- Heather Burge
- Heidi Burge
- Linda Burgess
- Kennedy Burke
- Alisa Burras
- Janell Burse
- Veronica Burton
- Heather Butler
- Tasha Butts
- Latasha Byears

== C ==
- Kelley Cain
- Maya Caldwell
- (Australia) Liz Cambage
- Edna Campbell
- Michelle Campbell
- Michelle Campbell
- Jordin Canada
- Emma Cannon
- Dominique Canty
- (Brazil) Kamilla Cardoso
- Jamie Carey
- (Canada) Bridget Carleton
- (Spain) Raquel Carrera
- DiJonai Carrington
- Essence Carson
- Amisha Carter
- Arica Carter
- Chennedy Carter
- Deborah Carter
- Swin Cash
- Jamie Cassidy
- Izi Castro Marques
- Tamika Catchings
- LaNeishea Caufield
- Maite Cazorla
- Elisabeth Cebrián
- Emma Čechová
- Keri Chaconas
- (Argentina) Florencia Chagas
- Cori Chambers
- Quianna Chaney
- Jill Chapman
- Daedra Charles
- Kaila Charles
- Tina Charles
- Sonia Chase
- Joy Cheek
- Kaitlyn Chen
- Felicia Chester
- Kaayla Chones
- Kayte Christensen
- Karima Christmas-Kelly
- Shameka Christon
- Shay Ciezki
- Kristi Cirone
- Sonia Citron
- Layshia Clarendon
- Alysha Clark
- Caitlin Clark
- Margold Clark
- (Australia) Michelle Cleary
- Courtney Clements
- Stacy Clinesmith
- Natasha Cloud
- Nia Clouden
- Claire Coggins
- Monique Coker
- Courtney Coleman
- Marissa Coleman
- Nádia Colhado
- Katrina Colleton
- Charli Collier
- Napheesa Collier
- Sydney Colson
- Megan Compain
- María Conde
- Andrea Congreaves
- Cara Consuegra
- Zia Cooke
- (Mali) Aicha Coulibaly
- Camille Cooper
- Cynthia Cooper-Dyke
- Te'a Cooper
- Kahleah Copper
- Carla Cortijo
- Lauren Cox
- Sylvia Crawley
- Willnett Crockett
- Danielle Crockrom
- Katie Cronin
- Shanna Crossley
- Cassandra Crumpton-Moorer
- Anna Cruz
- Lorela Cubaj
- Beth Cunningham
- Davalyn Cunningham
- Sophie Cunningham
- Monique Currie
- Edniesha Curry

== D ==
- (Serbia) Ana Dabović
- (Canada) Stacey Dales-Schuman
- Grace Daley
- Crystal Dangerfield
- (Brazil) Damiris Dantas
- Helen Darling
- Jessica Davenport
- Brandi Davis
- Clarissa Davis
- Dee Davis
- Kaela Davis
- Marquesha Davis
- Rennia Davis
- Tanae Davis-Cain
- (Brazil) Erika de Souza
- Anna DeForge
- (Belgium) Antonia Delaere
- Elena Delle Donne
- Jennifer Derevjanik
- Diamond Deshields
- Keitha Dickerson
- Jasmine Dickey
- Blake Dietrick
- Skylar Diggins
- Megan DiLeo
- Cierra Dillard
- Tai Dillard
- Liz Dixon
- Tamecka Dixon
- (Croatia) Ivana Dojkić
- Stefanie Dolson
- Nadine Domond
- Bethany Donaphin
- (Israel) Shay Doron
- Scholanda Robinson Dorrell
- (Brazil) Cintia dos Santos
- Clarissa dos Santos
- Katie Douglas
- Kathleen Doyle
- (Montenegro) Jelena Dubljević
- Megan Duffy
- (Serbia) (United States) Angela Dugalić
- Céline Dumerc
- Victoria Dunlap
- Candice Dupree
- Asia Durr
- (Poland) Margo Dydek

== E ==
- (Canada) Aaliyah Edwards
- Michelle Edwards
- Simone Edwards
- Teresa Edwards
- Tonya Edwards
- Queen Egbo
- Frida Eldebrink
- Aaryn Ellenberg
- Shyra Ely
- Emily Engstler
- Shalonda Enis
- (France) Olivia Époupa
- Summer Erb
- Lauren Ervin
- Dana Evans
- Dawn Evans

== F ==
- Temi Fagbenle
- Dyaisha Fair
- (Australia) Trisha Fallon
- (Spain) Awa Fam
- Dulcy Fankam Mendjiadeu
- Kelly Faris
- Barbara Farris
- Mariella Fasoula
- Jamierra Faulkner
- (France) Marine Fauthoux
- Sania Feagin
- Allison Feaster
- Sui Feifei
- Marie Ferdinand-Harris
- Marta Fernandez
- Marina Ferragut
- (Germany) Leonie Fiebich
- Nirra Fields
- Ukari Figgs
- Nadia Fingall
- (France) Isabelle Fijalkowski
- Olga Firsova
- Milena Flores
- (Spain) Alicia Flórez
- Tye'sha Fluker
- Kristin Folkl
- Cheryl Ford
- Kisha Ford
- Stacey Ford
- Toni Foster
- Alex Fowler
- Sylvia Fowles
- Desiree Francis
- A'Quonesia Franklin
- Megan Frazee
- Stacy Frese
- La'Keshia Frett
- Trina Frierson
- (Germany) Linda Fröhlich
- Azzi Fudd
- Sam Fuehring
- Candace Futrell

== G ==
- Katryna Gaither
- Travesa Gant
- Begona Garcia
- Kerri Gardin
- Andrea Gardner
- Rebekah Gardner
- Andrea Garner
- Pietra Gay
- Cornelia Gayden
- Katie Gearlds
- (Germany) Luisa Geiselsöder
- Jacki Gemelos
- (Australia) Cayla George
- Kim Gessig
- Kelley Gibson
- Briana Gilbreath-Butler
- Jennifer Gillom
- Usha Gilmore
- Kamela Gissendanner
- Chrissy Givens
- Emile Gomis
- Sasha Goodlett
- Angel Goodrich
- Adrienne Goodson
- Bridgette Gordon
- Gillian Goring
- Shaunzinski Gortman
- Margo Graham
- Erin Grant
- Bashaara Graves
- Denique Graves
- Allisha Gray
- Chance Gray
- Chelsea Gray
- Reshanda Gray
- Alexis Gray-Lawson
- Michelle Greco
- Zaay Green
- Kalana Greene
- Nikki Greene
- Cisti Greenwalt
- (Croatia) Vedrana Grgin-Fonseca
- Aubrey Griffin
- (Australia) Kelsey Griffin
- Yolanda Griffith
- Brittney Griner
- Lady Grooms
- Gordana Grubin
- (France) Sandrine Gruda
- Wanda Guyton
- Jazmon Gwathmey

== H ==
- Mikiko Hagiwara
- Kamesha Hairston
- Amber Hall
- Bree Hall
- Vicki Hall
- Angie Hamblin
- Ruth Hamblin
- Dearica Hamby
- Becky Hammon
- Keisha Hampton
- Kym Hampton
- Jennifer Hamson
- Romana Hamzová
- Alex Harden
- Lindsey Harding
- Rori Harmon
- Laura Harper
- Donna Harrington
- Amber Harris
- Fran Harris
- Tyasha Harris
- Isabelle Harrison
- Jordan Harrison
- Lisa Harrison
- (Australia) Kristi Harrower
- Bria Hartley
- Jasmine Hassell
- Tianna Hawkins
- Vanessa Hayden
- Tiffany Hayes
- Kristin Haynie
- Dena Head
- (Australia) Shyla Heal
- Ruthy Hebard
- Lexi Held
- Destanni Henderson
- Nekeshia Henderson
- Tracy Henderson
- Sonja Henning
- Aneika Henry
- Mikiah Herbert Harrigan
- Amy Herrig
- (Australia) Katrina Hibbert
- Jessie Hicks
- Natisha Hiedeman
- Allison Hightower
- E. C. Hill
- Tayler Hill
- Naz Hillmon
- Khaalia Hillsman
- Myisha Hines-Allen
- Korie Hlede
- Roneeka Hodges
- Emese Hof
- Ebony Hoffman
- Chamique Holdsclaw
- Kedra Holland-Corn
- Quanitra Hollingsworth
- Rachel Hollivay
- Bria Holmes
- Sequoia Holmes
- Joyner Holmes
- Joy Holmes
- Mackenzie Holmes
- Amber Holt
- Jordan Hooper
- Andrea Hoover
- Kym Hope
- Chelsea Hopkins
- Susie Hopson-Shelton
- Alexis Hornbuckle
- Jordan Horston
- Charde Houston
- Ashley Houts
- Anriel Howard
- Jennifer Howard
- Natasha Howard
- Rhyne Howard
- Brittany Hrynko
- Megan Huff
- Lexie Hull
- Tasha Humphrey

== I ==
- (Nigeria) Ify Ibekwe
- (United States) Sabrina Ionescu
- (United States) Kiki Iriafen
- (United States) Sandora Irvin
- (Hungary) Dalma Iványi
- (United States) Niele Ivey

== J ==
- Angela Jackson
- Ashlon Jackson
- Chloe Jackson
- Deanna Jackson
- Gwen Jackson
- (Australia) Lauren Jackson
- Rickea Jackson
- Tamicha Jackson
- Tammy Jackson
- Tia Jackson
- Tiffany Jackson
- Amber Jacobs
- Aziaha James
- Jasmine James
- Tamara James
- Briann January
- Gabriela Jaquez
- (Australia) Rachel Jarry
- Moriah Jefferson
- Chucky Jeffery
- Anete Jēkabsone-Žogota
- Alisia Jenkins
- (Lithuania) Justė Jocytė
- Ashley Joens
- Catherine Joens
- (France) Marine Johannès
- Pollyanna Johns Kimbrough
- Adrienne Johnson
- Chandra Johnson
- Flau'jae Johnson
- Glory Johnson
- Jaclyn Johnson
- LaTonya Johnson
- Leslie Johnson
- Niesa Johnson
- Raven Johnson
- Shannon Johnson
- Shenise Johnson
- Stella Johnson
- Temeka Johnson
- Tiffani Johnson
- Vickie Johnson
- (Czech Republic) Eliška Joklová
- Kellie Jolly Harper
- Alexis Jones
- Asjha Jones
- Brionna Jones
- Chandi Jones
- Haley Jones
- Jameka Jones
- Jazmine Jones
- Jonquel Jones
- Larecha Jones
- Marion Jones
- Merlakia Jones
- Stephanie Jones
- Carolyn Jones-Young
- Pauline Jordan
- (Hungary) Dorka Juhász
- (Lithuania) Laura Juškaitė

== K ==
- Aneta Kausaite
- Paris Kea
- Shae Kelley
- Crystal Kelly
- Teonni Key
- Brianna Kiesel
- Liatu King
- Susan King Borchardt
- (Australia) Jae Kingi-Cross
- Lynetta Kizer
- Zuzi Klimesova
- Gianna Kneepkens
- Whitney Knight
- Ewelina Kobryn
- Laurie Koehn
- Sika Koné
- Ilona Korstin
- Greta Koss
- Anastasia Kostaki
- Tanja Kostic
- Anastasiia Kosu
- Cathrine Kraayeveld
- Nicole Kubik
- Awak Kuier
- Andrea Kuklová

== L ==
- Leïla Lacan
- (Australia) Alison Lacey
- Jennifer Lacy
- Natasha Lacy
- Venus Lacy
- (Australia) Annie La Fleur
- Monica Lamb
- Kitija Laksa
- Kyra Lambert
- Sheila Lambert
- Betnijah Laney-Hamilton
- Marlelynn Lange-Harris
- Crystal Langhorne
- Krystyna Lara
- Erlana Larkins
- Amanda Lassiter
- Ta'Niya Latson
- Ivory Latta
- Jantel Lavender
- Kara Lawson
- Edwige Lawson-Wade
- Katarina Lazić
- Charlisse Leger-Walker
- Shalee Lehning
- Carla Leite
- Betty Lennox
- Kiara Leslie
- Lisa Leslie
- Yelena Leuchanka
- Nicole Levesque
- Doneeka Lewis
- Takeisha Lewis
- Tynesha Lewis
- Nancy Lieberman
- Miao Lijie
- Taylor Lilley
- (Belgium) Kyara Linskens
- Jasmine Lister
- Tricia Liston
- Camille Little
- Darianna Littlepage-Buggs
- Andrea Lloyd-Curry
- Rebecca Lobo
- Samantha Logic
- Stacey Lovelace
- Jewell Loyd
- Maggie Lucas
- Pat Luckey
- Helen Luz
- Sancho Lyttle

== M ==
- Mwadi Mabika
- Marina Mabrey
- Victoria Macaulay
- Laura Macchi
- Clarisse Machanguana
- (Japan) Rui Machida
- Natasha Mack
- Tess Madgen
- (Australia) Ezi Magbegor
- Megan Mahoney
- Shea Mahoney
- (Mali) Hamchetou Maiga-Ba
- Taina Mair
- Nadine Malcolm
- (Australia) Anneli Maley
- Sonja Mallory
- (France) Dominique Malonga
- Ally Malott
- (Greece) Evanthia Maltsi
- Kristen Mann
- Sharon Manning
- Rhonda Mapp
- Michelle M. Marciniak
- (Romania) Gabriela Marginean
- Rayah Marshall
- Kate Martin
- Maylana Martin
- (Spain) Nuria Martínez
- (Italy) Raffaella Masciadri
- A'dia Mathies
- Caity Matter
- Katie Mattera
- Anita Maxwell
- Monica Maxwell
- Kelly Mazzante
- Kayla McBride
- Brandi McCain
- Tiffany McCain
- Rashanda McCants
- Janel McCarville
- Megan McConnell
- Suzie McConnell-Serio
- Angel McCoughtry
- Teaira McCowan
- Danielle McCray
- Nikki McCray
- Nicky McCrimmon
- Danielle McCulley
- Aari McDonald
- Pamela McGee
- Imani McGee-Stafford
- Carla McGhee
- Nadirah McKenith
- Shanece McKinney
- Cotie McMahon
- Taj McWilliams-Franklin
- Emma Meesseman
- Jade Melbourne
- Chasity Melvin
- Giuliana Mendiola
- Taylor Mikesell
- Olivia Miles
- Britany Miller
- Coco Miller
- Diamond Miller
- Kelly Miller
- Macy Miller
- Teana Miller
- Tausha Mills
- Jelena Milovanovic
- DeLisha Milton-Jones
- Kelsey Mitchell
- (Australia) Leilani Mitchell
- Liz Moeggenberg
- (Brazil) Adriana Moises
- Chanel Mokango
- Jacinta Monroe
- Anna Montañana
- Alex Montgomery
- Renee Montgomery
- Jackie Moore
- Jessica Moore
- Lindsey Moore
- Loree Moore
- Maya Moore
- Navonda Moore
- Penny Moore
- Tamara Moore
- Yolanda Moore
- Carolyn Moos
- Tonie Morgan
- Darxia Morris
- Jené Morris
- (Chile) Ziomara Morrison
- Aneesah Morrow
- Bernice Mosby
- Brene Moseley
- Judy Mosley-McAfee
- Kaleena Mosqueda-Lewis
- Jenny Mowe
- (Croatia) Nika Mühl
- Razija Mujanović
- Naomi Mulitauaopele
- Shay Murphy
- Murjanatu Musa
- Ndjakalenga Mwenentanda

== N ==
- (Ivory Coast) Christelle N'Garsanet
- (Hungary) Andrea Nagy
- (China) Chen Nan
- (Senegal) Astou Ndiaye-Diatta
- (France) Emmeline Ndongue
- (Spain) Astou Ndour-Fall
- (United States) Olivia Nelson-Ododa
- (Czech Republic) Eva Nemcova
- (Brazil) Cláudia das Neves
- (United States) Chelsea Newton
- (Democratic Republic of the Congo) Bernadette Ngoyisa
- (United States) Tina Nicholson
- (Netherlands) Marlous Nieuwveen
- (Serbia) Mila Nikolich
- (United States) Indya Nivar
- (Sweden) Chioma Nnamaka
- (Serbia) Jovana Nogić
- (United States) (Russia) Deanna Nolan
- (United States) Natalie Novosel
- (Canada) Kia Nurse
- (United States) Vanessa Nygaard
- (United States) Aaliyah Nye

== O ==
- (Slovenia) Teja Oblak
- Leaonna Odom
- (Australia) Jenna O'Hea
- Jennifer O'Neill
- Kristen O'Neill
- Yuko Oga
- Arike Ogunbowale
- Chiney Ogwumike
- Nneka Ogwumike
- Nicole Ohlde
- Amy Okonkwo
- (Kenya) Madina Okot
- Abi Olajuwon
- Lucy Olsen
- Michaela Onyenwere
- Ugonne Onyiah
- Inga Orekhova
- Charisma Osborne
- Irina Osipova
- Heather Owen
- Shantia Owens

== P ==
- (Serbia) Danielle Page
- Murriel Page
- Yolanda Paige
- Sabrina Palie
- Wendy Palmer-Daniel
- Te-Hina Paopao
- Courtney Paris
- Candace Parker
- Cheyenne Parker-Tyus
- Florina Pașcalău
- Tia Paschal
- Michaela Pavlíčková
- Kate Paye
- Kayla Pedersen
- Ticha Penicheiro
- Jocelyn Penn
- (Serbia) Jasmina Perazić
- Jia Perkins
- Erin Perperoglou
- Kim Perrot
- Devereaux Peters
- Haley Peters
- (Serbia) Sonja Petrović
- Bridget Pettis
- (Australia) Erin Phillips
- Porsha Phillips
- Ta'Shia Phillips
- Tari Phillips
- Plenette Pierson
- Alissa Pili
- Justine Pissott
- Theresa Plaisance
- Kelsey Plum
- Saylor Poffenbarger
- Jeanette Pohlen
- Khayla Pointer
- Catarina Pollini
- Cappie Pondexter
- Chelsea Poppens
- Angie Potthoff
- Elaine Powell
- Nicole Powell
- Aerial Powers
- Samantha Prahalis
- Ashten Prechtel
- Armintie Price
- Franthea Price
- Lynn Pride
- Epiphanny Prince
- Cassandre Prosper

== Q ==
- (United States) Brooke Queenan
- (United States) Allie Quigley
- (United States) JJ Quinerly
- (United States) Noelle Quinn
- (United States) Texlin Quinney

== R ==
- (Montenegro) Hajdana Radunović
- Felicia Ragland
- Semeka Randall
- Kristen Rasmussen
- Brittainey Raven
- Stephanie Raymond
- Jamie Redd
- Katelan Redmon
- Brandy Reed
- Chastity Reed
- Michelle Reed
- Angel Reese
- Tracy Reid
- Tammi Reiss
- Kathrin Ress
- DiDi Richards
- Andrea Riley
- Ruth Riley
- Kiki Rice
- Saniya Rivers
- Jennifer Rizzotti
- Nyree Roberts
- Angel Robinson
- Ashley Robinson
- Crystal Robinson
- Danielle Robinson
- Renee Robinson
- Sugar Rodgers
- Jannon Roland
- Waltiea Rolle
- (Spain) Leticia Romero
- Adrienne Ross
- Tierra Ruffin-Pratt
- Iliana Rupert
- Leah Rush
- Mercedes Russell
- Eugenia Rycraw

== S ==
- Nyara Sabally
- Satou Sabally
- Janelle Salaün
- Nykesha Sales
- Ángela Salvadores
- Sheri Sam
- Charisse Sampson
- Karlie Samuelson
- Katie Lou Samuelson
- Isabel Sánchez
- Amy Sanders
- LaToya Sanders
- Nakia Sanford
- Olayinka Sanni
- Kelly Santos
- Alessandra Santos de Oliveira
- Rankica Šarenac
- Paige Sauer
- Jaynetta Saunders
- Audrey Sauret
- Laure Savasta
- Shoni Schimmel
- Kelly Schumacher
- Georgia Schweitzer
- Madison Scott
- Olympia Scott
- Raegan Scott
- Shyanne Sellers
- (Mexico) Lou Lopez Sénéchal
- Elen Shakirova
- K. B. Sharp
- Chay Shegog
- Jacy Sheldon
- Jessica Shepard
- Aisha Sheppard
- Jaylyn Sherrod
- Ashley Shields
- Adrienne Shuler
- Maddy Siegrist
- Meighan Simmons
- Dymond Simon
- Odyssey Sims
- (France) Kadi Sissoko
- Hannah Sjerven
- Madinah Slaise
- Gwen Slaughter
- Gergana Slavcheva
- Destiny Slocum
- Aiysha Smith
- (Australia) Alanna Smith
- Brooke Smith
- Charlotte Smith
- Charmin Smith
- Christy Smith
- Crystal Smith
- Jennifer Smith
- Katie Smith
- Kim Smith
- LaCharlotte Smith
- NaLyssa Smith
- Tangela Smith
- Tyresa Smith
- Wanisha Smith
- (Australia) Belinda Snell
- Michelle Snow
- (Brazil) Stephanie Soares
- Leila Sobral
- Taylor Soule
- Miela Sowah
- Sidney Spencer
- (Australia) Rachael Sporn
- Trisha Stafford-Odom
- Dawn Staley
- Tiffany Stansbury
- Kate Starbird
- Katy Steding
- Maria Stepanova
- Rehema Stephens
- Stacy Stephens
- Azurá Stevens
- Mandisa Stevenson
- Breanna Stewart
- Jackie Stiles
- Valerie Still
- Andrea Stinson
- Shanele Stires
- Tamara Stocks
- Kiah Stokes
- Jurgita Štreimikytė
- Shekinna Stricklen
- Ann Strother
- Marta Suárez
- Tora Suber
- (Australia) Laura Summerton
- Jung Sun-Min
- Serena Sundell
- Sug Sutton
- Tammy Sutton-Brown
- Ketia Swanier
- Sheryl Swoopes
- Carolyn Swords
- April Sykes
- Brittney Sykes

== T ==
- (Australia) Stephanie Talbot
- Zane Tamane
- Sonja Tate
- Diana Taurasi
- Asia Taylor
- Camryn Taylor
- Celeste Taylor
- Lindsay Taylor
- (Australia) Penny Taylor
- Sparkle Taylor
- Sydney Taylor
- Nikki Teasley
- Kasha Terry
- Taylor Thierry
- Alyssa Thomas
- Carla Thomas
- Christi Thomas
- Jasmine Thomas
- Krystal Thomas
- LaToya Thomas
- Stacey Thomas
- Alicia Thompson
- Amanda Thompson
- Tina Thompson
- Shona Thorburn
- Erin Thorn
- Kayla Thornton
- Robin Threatt
- Iciss Tillis
- (Australia) Michele Timms
- Makayla Timpson
- Joslyn Tinkle
- Ramu Tokashiki
- Penny Toler
- Kristi Toliver
- (Australia) Marianna Tolo
- Elena Tornikidou
- Levys Torres
- (France) Mamignan Touré
- Tiffany Travis
- Chantel Tremitiere
- Trena Trice
- Morgan Tuck
- Barbara Turner
- Brianna Turner
- Molly Tuter
- Slobodanka Tuvić
- Polina Tzekova

== U ==
- (Nigeria) Mfon Udoka
- (Hungary) Petra Ujhelyi
- (United States) Itoro Umoh-Coleman
- (Turkey) Sevgi Uzun

== V ==
- (Spain) Amaya Valdemoro
- (United States) Michele Van Gorp
- (United States) Courtney Vandersloot
- (Netherlands) Alexandra Van Embricqs
- (United States) Hailey Van Lith
- (Belgium) Julie Vanloo
- (United States) Grace VanSlooten
- (United States) Kia Vaughn
- (United States) Krystal Vaughn
- (Australia) Kristen Veal
- (Czech Republic) Jana Vesela
- (Italy) Danielle Viglione
- (Serbia) Daliborka Vilipić
- (Czech Republic) Kamila Vodichkova
- (Russia) Natalia Vodopyanova
- (Serbia) Milica Vukadinović

== W ==
- Ashley Walker
- Ayana Walker
- DeMya Walker
- Jasmine Walker
- Marcedes Walker
- Megan Walker
- Shatori Walker-Kimbrough
- (Australia) Kristy Wallace
- Maren Walseth
- Avery Warley-Talbert
- Coquese Washington
- Tonya Washington
- Ann Wauters
- Teresa Weatherspoon
- Umeki Webb
- Martina Weber
- Kendra Wecker
- Jamie Weisner
- Kathryn Westbeld
- Maddy Westbeld
- Evina Westbrook
- Lindsay Whalen
- Erica Wheeler
- (Australia) Sami Whitcomb
- DeTrina White
- Erica White
- Stephanie White
- Tan White
- Val Whiting
- Tamika Whitmore
- Khadijah Whittington
- (Australia) Jenny Whittle
- Davellyn Whyte
- Sue Wicks
- Jamila Wideman
- Sydney Wiese
- Candice Wiggins
- Brittany Wilkins
- Angelina Williams
- Beverly Williams
- Christyn Williams
- Courtney Williams
- Debra Williams
- Elizabeth Williams
- Gabby Williams
- Kamiko Williams
- Kiana Williams
- Kim Williams
- Lenae Williams
- Madi Williams
- Natalie Williams
- Peyton Williams
- Riquna Williams
- Rita Williams
- Serah Williams
- Shaquala Williams
- Tamika Williams-Jeter
- Tara Williams
- Toccara Williams
- Adrian Williams-Strong
- Le'coe Willingham
- Lisa Willis
- Wendi Willits
- Jocelyn Willoughby
- A'ja Wilson
- Aaliyah Wilson
- Alex Wilson
- Holly Winterburn
- Christina Wirth
- Lindsay Wisdom-Hylton
- Sophia Witherspoon
- Julie Wojta
- Kara Wolters
- Angelina Wolvert
- Lynette Woodard
- Tiffany Woosley
- Imani Wright
- Monica Wright
- Shereka Wright
- Tanisha Wright
- Brooke Wyckoff
- Dana Wynne

== X ==
- (Spain) Marta Xargay
- (China) Han Xu

== Y ==
- (Japan) Mai Yamamoto
- (United States) Lindsey Yamasaki
- (United States) Corissa Yasen
- (Turkey) Nevriye Yılmaz
- Jackie Young
- (United States) (Saint Vincent and the Grenadines) Sophia Young
- (United States) Tamera Young
- (United States) Toni Young
- Li Yueru

== Z ==
- (Sweden) Amanda Zahui B.
- (Russia) Oksana Zakalyuzhnaya
- (Italy) Cecilia Zandalasini
- (Italy) Francesca Zara
- (Croatia) (United States) Shavonte Zellous
- (China) Haixia Zheng
- (Slovakia) Zuzana Žirková
- (United States) Sharnee Zoll-Norman
