= 2001 Seattle Storm season =

- Head coach: Lin Dunn
- Arena: KeyArena at Seattle Center

Results
- Record: 10–22 (.313)
- Place: 8th (Western)
- Playoff finish: Did not qualify

Media
- Television: KSTW (UPN 11); Fox Sports Net Northwest

The 2001 WNBA season was the second season for the Seattle Storm.

== Transactions ==
=== WNBA draft ===
Round	Pick	Player	Nationality	School/Team/Country
1	1	Lauren Jackson	Australia	Canberra Capitals (Australia)
2	17	Semeka Randall	United States	Tennessee
4	49	Juana Brown	United States	North Carolina

=== Transactions ===
Date	Transaction
April 20, 2001	Drafted Lauren Jackson, Semeka Randall and Juana Brown in the 2001 WNBA draft
April 24, 2001	Traded Edna Campbell and a 2002 4th Round Pick to the Sacramento Monarchs in exchange for Katy Steding and a 2002 2nd Round Pick
April 26, 2001	Waived Charisse Sampson
April 30, 2001	Signed Alessandra Santos de Oliveira and Amber Hall
May 11, 2001	Waived Amber Hall and Robin Threatt-Elliott
May 25, 2001	Waived Andrea Garner and Juana Brown
May 27, 2001	Suspended contract of Alessandra Santos de Oliveira
June 6, 2001	Waived Katrina Hibbert
June 8, 2001	Signed Michelle Marciniak

== Roster ==
2001 Seattle Storm roster
Players
Coaches

Pos.	No.	Nat.	Name	Height	Weight	DOB	From	Yrs
C	42	(United States)	Barnes, Quacy	6' 5" (1.96m)	185 lb (84kg)	1976-09-26	Indiana	2
G	44	(United States)	Edwards, Michelle	5' 9" (1.75m)	150 lb (68kg)	1966-03-06	Iowa	4
C	4	(Jamaica)	Edwards, Simone	6' 4" (1.93m)	164 lb (74kg)	1973-11-17	Iowa	1
G	34	(United States)	Henning, Sonja	5' 7" (1.7m)	143 lb (65kg)	1969-11-04	Stanford	2
F/C	15	(Australia)	Jackson, Lauren	6' 6" (1.98m)	187 lb (85kg)	1981-05-11		R
C	32	(United States)	Lovelace, Stacey	6' 4" (1.93m)	170 lb (77kg)	1974-12-05	Purdue	1
G	3	(United States)	Marciniak, Michelle	5' 10" (1.78m)	154 lb (70kg)	1973-10-29	Tennessee	1
G	21	(United States)	Randall, Semeka	5' 9" (1.75m)	164 lb (74kg)	1979-02-07	Tennessee	R
F	11	(United States)	Redd, Jamie	6' 1" (1.85m)	164 lb (74kg)	1977-11-05	Washington	1
C	13	(Brazil)	Santos de Oliveira, Alessandra	6' 5" (1.96m)	181 lb (82kg)	1973-12-02		3
G	55	(United States)	Smith, Charmin	5' 10" (1.78m)	145 lb (66kg)	1975-05-02	Stanford	2
F	23	(United States)	Steding, Katy	6' 0" (1.83m)	173 lb (78kg)	1967-12-11	Stanford	1
F/C	7	(Czechoslovakia)	Vodičková, Kamila	6' 4" (1.93m)	190 lb (86kg)	1972-12-19		1

Head coach
(United States) Lin Dunn (UT Martin)
Assistant coaches
(United States) Daniel Shapiro
(United States) Sheri Hedlund
(United States) Kay James
(United States) Gary Kloppenburg

Legend

- (C) Team captain
- (DP) Unsigned draft pick
- (FA) Free agent
- (S) Suspended
- Injured

== Schedule ==
=== Regular season ===
2001 game log
Total: 10–22 (Home: 5–11; Road: 5–11)
May: 1–0 (Home: 1–0; Road: 0–0)

Game	Date	Team	Score	High points	High rebounds	High assists	Location Attendance	Record
1	May 31	Phoenix	W 83–70	Lauren Jackson (21)	Simone Edwards (8)	Sonja Henning (5)	KeyArena	1–0

June : 6–7 (Home: 2–4; Road: 4–3)

Game	Date	Team	Score	High points	High rebounds	High assists	Location Attendance	Record
2	June 3	@ Washington	L 63–68	Semeka Randall (16)	S. Edwards; Jackson (7)	Sonja Henning (6)	MCI Center	1–1
3	June 4	@ Indiana	W 74–71	Lauren Jackson (18)	Katy Steding (8)	Sonja Henning (6)	Conseco Fieldhouse	2–1
4	June 7	Miami	L 57–70	Lauren Jackson (16)	Quacy Barnes (5)	Sonja Henning (4)	KeyArena	2–2
5	June 9	@ Utah	W 73–65	Katy Steding (16)	Simone Edwards (8)	Henning; Randall (4)	Delta Center	3–2
6	June 12	Orlando	W 70–63	Semeka Randall (28)	Simone Edwards (14)	S. Edwards; Henning; Smith (3)	KeyArena	4–2
7	June 14	Cleveland	L 36–58	Lauren Jackson (12)	Randall; Smith (5)	Semeka Randall (3)	KeyArena	4–3
8	June 16	Los Angeles	L 60–73	Lauren Jackson (19)	Semeka Randall (7)	Stacey Lovelace (3)	KeyArena	4–4
9	June 18	Charlotte	W 60–52	Lauren Jackson (18)	Lauren Jackson (9)	Lauren Jackson (3)	KeyArena	5–4
10	June 19	@ Portland	L 43–58	Lauren Jackson (11)	Lauren Jackson (8)	Jamie Redd (2)	Rose Garden	5–5
11	June 22	@ Phoenix	W 58–55	Lauren Jackson (17)	S. Edwards; Jackson (8)	Henning; Vodičková (3)	America West Arena	6–5
12	June 25	@ Utah	W 65–47	Lauren Jackson (14)	Lauren Jackson (9)	Jackson; Smith (3)	Delta Center	7–5
13	June 28	@ Minnesota	L 59–68	Kamila Vodičková (14)	S. Edwards; Vodičková (5)	Sonja Henning (4)	Target Center	7–6
14	June 30	Sacramento	L 59–65	Lauren Jackson (18)	Lauren Jackson (5)	Semeka Randall (6)	KeyArena	7–7

July : 2–10 (Home: 1–4; Road: 1–6)

Game	Date	Team	Score	High points	High rebounds	High assists	Location Attendance	Record
15	July 3	Washington	L 69–72 (4OT)	Lauren Jackson (24)	Lauren Jackson (12)	Henning; Marciniak; Redd (4)	KeyArena	7–8
16	July 4	@ Portland	W 61–56	Jackson; Redd (18)	Lauren Jackson (12)	Semeka Randall (4)	Rose Garden	8–8
17	July 7	@ Charlotte	L 38–48	Simone Edwards (14)	S. Edwards; Randall (5)	Sonja Henning (3)	Charlotte Coliseum	8–9
18	July 10	@ Cleveland	L 53–59	Lauren Jackson (17)	Lauren Jackson (7)	Sonja Henning (6)	Gund Arena	8–10
19	July 11	@ New York	L 53–67	Simone Edwards (16)	Simone Edwards (7)	Henning; Smith (3)	Madison Square Garden	8–11
20	July 13	Houston	L 57–69	Simone Edwards (19)	S. Edwards; Jackson (5)	Sonja Henning (7)	KeyArena	8–12
21	July 18	@ Minnesota	L 58–68	Lauren Jackson (21)	Lauren Jackson (10)	S. Edwards; Jackson; Smith (3)	Target Center	8–13
22	July 20	Portland	L 49–56	Semeka Randall (14)	Semeka Randall (6)	Sonja Henning (5)	KeyArena	8–14
23	July 21	@ Los Angeles	L 79–85	Jamie Redd (24)	Lauren Jackson (6)	Michelle Marciniak (4)	Staples Center	8–15
24	July 24	Detroit	W 74–69 (OT)	Lauren Jackson (25)	Lauren Jackson (9)	Sonja Henning (4)	KeyArena	9–15
25	July 27	Phoenix	L 54–56	Semeka Randall (19)	Lauren Jackson (13)	Lauren Jackson (2)	KeyArena	9–16
26	July 30	@ Houston	L 51–55	Lauren Jackson (16)	S. Edwards; Jackson; Smith; Vodičková (4)	Redd; Vodičková (2)	Compaq Center	9–17

August : 1–5 (Home: 1–3; Road: 0–2)

Game	Date	Team	Score	High points	High rebounds	High assists	Location Attendance	Record
27	August 3	Utah	L 61–64	Lauren Jackson (16)	Lauren Jackson (6)	Henning; Jackson; Marciniak; Randall (2)	KeyArena	9–18
28	August 4	@ Los Angeles	L 60–79	Lauren Jackson (26)	Lauren Jackson (7)	Michelle Marciniak (8)	Staples Center	9–19
29	August 8	Houston	W 72–55	Simone Edwards (17)	Jackson; Marciniak (6)	Marciniak; Redd (5)	KeyArena	10–19
30	August 10	Minnesota	L 51–65	Lauren Jackson (13)	Quacy Barnes (6)	Sonja Henning (4)	KeyArena	10–20
31	August 11	@ Sacramento	L 61–81	Jamie Redd (24)	Quacy Barnes (8)	Michelle Marciniak (5)	ARCO Arena	10–21
32	August 14	Sacramento	L 62–72	Lovelace; Redd (14)	Simone Edwards (7)	Michelle Marciniak (4)	KeyArena	10–22

2001 season schedule

=== Season standings ===
Western Conference	W	L	PCT	Conf.	GB
Los Angeles Sparks ^{x}	28	4	.875	19–2	–
Sacramento Monarchs ^{x}	20	12	.625	13–8	8.0
Utah Starzz ^{x}	19	13	.594	11–10	9.0
Houston Comets ^{x}	19	13	.594	13–8	9.0
Phoenix Mercury ^{o}	13	19	.406	8–13	15.0
Minnesota Lynx ^{o}	12	20	.375	9–12	16.0
Portland Fire ^{o}	11	21	.344	5–16	17.0
Seattle Storm ^{o}	10	22	.313	6–15	18.0

== Statistics ==
Legend
GP	Games played	GS	Games started	MPG	Minutes per game	RPG	Rebounds per game
APG	Assists per game	SPG	Steals per game	BPG	Blocks per game	PPG	Points per game
FG%	Field-goal percentage	3P%	3-point field-goal percentage	FT%	Free-throw percentage	TO	Turnovers per game
PF	Fouls per game		Team leader		League leader

=== Regular season ===
Player	GP	GS	MPG	FG%	3P%	FT%	RPG	APG	SPG	BPG	PPG
Lauren Jackson	29	29	34.5	.367	.310	.727	6.7	1.5	1.9	2.2	15.2
Sonja Henning	32	28	28.2	.318	.182	.514	2.2	2.9	1.6	0.2	3.4
Semeka Randall	32	30	27.6	.371	.000	.660	3.3	1.4	0.9	0.1	9.4
Simone Edwards	32	27	25.3	.479	N/A	.663	4.9	0.8	0.8	0.6	7.4
Jamie Redd	32	6	20.6	.380	.286	.682	2.6	1.5	0.5	0.1	7.2
Charmin Smith	32	8	18.4	.270	.289	.619	1.7	1.2	0.5	0.0	1.8
Katy Steding	26	17	15.1	.372	.457	.800	1.3	0.9	0.6	0.3	3.9
Michelle Marciniak	27	5	14.5	.367	.303	.541	1.4	1.7	1.1	0.1	4.9
Kamila Vodičková	29	4	14.0	.418	.400	.864	2.4	0.8	0.6	0.2	5.2
Quacy Barnes	20	3	11.5	.390	1.000	.778	1.7	0.6	0.5	0.3	3.4
Stacey Lovelace	22	2	9.6	.380	.385	.706	1.5	0.4	0.4	0.2	3.5
Alessandra Santos de Oliveira	10	1	6.2	.286	N/A	.455	1.6	0.0	0.0	0.0	1.3
Michelle Edwards	3	0	4.3	.333	N/A	1.000	0.7	0.3	0.3	0.0	1.3

^{‡}Waived/Released during the season
^{†}Traded during the season
^{≠}Acquired during the season
