= 2000 Seattle Storm season =

- Head coach: Lin Dunn
- Arena: KeyArena at Seattle Center

Results
- Record: 6–26 (.188)
- Place: 8th (Western)
- Playoff finish: Did not qualify

The 2000 WNBA season was the first season for the Seattle Storm.

== Transactions ==
=== WNBA expansion draft ===
Player	Nationality	Former WNBA Team
Edna Campbell	United States	Phoenix Mercury
Sonja Henning	United States	New York Liberty
Angela Aycock	United States	Minnesota Lynx
Nina Bjedov	Yugoslavia	Los Angeles Sparks
Toni Foster	United States	Phoenix Mercury
Charmin Smith	United States	Minnesota Lynx

=== WNBA draft ===
Round	Pick	Player	Nationality	School/Team/Country
1	9	Kamila Vodičková	Czechoslovakia	Gambrinus Brno (Czech Republic)
2	25	Charisse Sampson	United States	New England Blizzard
3	41	Kirra Jordan	United States	Rice
4	57	Katrina Hibbert	Australia	St. Francis (NY)

=== Transactions ===
Date	Transaction
December 15, 1999	Drafted Edna Campbell, Sonja Henning, Angela Aycock, Nina Bjedov, Toni Foster and Charmin Smith in the WNBA expansion draft
April 25, 2000	Drafted Kamila Vodičková, Charisse Sampson, Kirra Jordan and Katrina Hibbert in the 2000 WNBA draft
May 15, 2000	Waived Toni Foster
May 27, 2000	Traded a 2001 4th Round Pick to the Houston Comets in exchange for Andrea Garner
May 28, 2000	Waived Dana Wynne and Kirra Jordan
June 8, 2000	Waived Angela Aycock and Tajama Abraham
June 8, 2000	Signed Stacey Lovelace
June 11, 2000	Traded Nina Bjedov to the Cleveland Rockers in exchange for Michelle Edwards

== Roster ==
2000 Seattle Storm roster
Players
Coaches

Pos.	No.	Nat.	Name	Height	Weight	DOB	From	Yrs
G	23	(United States)	Aycock, Angela	6' 2" (1.88m)	161 lb (73kg)	1973-02-28	Kansas	1
C	42	(United States)	Barnes, Quacy	6' 5" (1.96m)	185 lb (84kg)	1976-09-26	Indiana	1
G	12	(United States)	Campbell, Edna	5' 8" (1.73m)	152 lb (69kg)	1968-11-26	Texas	1
G	44	(United States)	Edwards, Michelle	5' 9" (1.75m)	150 lb (68kg)	1966-03-06	Iowa	3
C	4	(Jamaica)	Edwards, Simone	6' 4" (1.93m)	164 lb (74kg)	1973-11-17	Iowa	R
F/C	30	(United States)	Garner, Andrea	6' 3" (1.91m)	160 lb (73kg)	1979-01-05	Penn State	R
G	34	(United States)	Henning, Sonja	5' 7" (1.7m)	143 lb (65kg)	1969-11-04	Stanford	1
G/F	40	(Australia)	Hibbert, Katrina	5' 10" (1.78m)	172 lb (78kg)	1977-09-29	LSU	R
C	32	(United States)	Lovelace, Stacey	6' 4" (1.93m)	170 lb (77kg)	1974-12-05	Purdue	R
F	50	(United States)	Redd, Jamie	6' 1" (1.85m)	164 lb (74kg)	1977-11-05	Washington	R
G	3	(United States)	Sampson, Charisse	5' 11" (1.8m)		1974-09-01	Kansas	R
G	50	(United States)	Smith, Charmin	5' 10" (1.78m)	145 lb (66kg)	1975-05-02	Stanford	1
G	32	(United States)	Threatt-Elliott, Robin	5' 7" (1.7m)	150 lb (68kg)	1970-07-01	Wisconsin	R
F/C	7	(Czechoslovakia)	Vodičková, Kamila	6' 4" (1.93m)	190 lb (86kg)	1972-12-19		R

Head coach
(United States) Lin Dunn (UT Martin)
Assistant coaches
(United States) Missy Bequette
(United States) Gary Kloppenburg
(United States) Kathy Anderson
(United States) Daniel Shapiro
(United States) Tamara Poole

Legend

- (C) Team captain
- (DP) Unsigned draft pick
- (FA) Free agent
- (S) Suspended
- Injured

== Schedule ==
=== Regular season ===
2000 game log
Total: 6–26 (Home: 4–13; Road: 2–13)
May: 0–1 (Home: 0–0; Road: 0–1)

Game	Date	Team	Score	High points	High rebounds	High assists	Location Attendance	Record
1	May 31	@ Sacramento	L 60-76	Edna Campbell (22)	Kamila Vodičková (9)	Katrina Hibbert (3)	ARCO Arena	0–1

June: 2–10 (Home: 1–6; Road: 1–4)

Game	Date	Team	Score	High points	High rebounds	High assists	Location Attendance	Record
2	June 1	Houston	L 47-77	Quacy Barnes (16)	Kamila Vodičková (7)	Sonja Henning (3)	KeyArena	0–2
3	June 3	Portland	L 58-65	Edna Campbell (18)	Kamila Vodičková (8)	Charmin Smith (4)	KeyArena	0–3
4	June 7	@ Phoenix	L 49-82	Kamila Vodičková (12)	Simone Edwards (8)	Sonja Henning (2)	America West Arena	0–4
5	June 9	@ Charlotte	W 67-62	Edna Campbell (19)	Stacey Lovelace (9)	Edna Campbell (5)	Charlotte Coliseum	1–4
6	June 10	@ Cleveland	L 49-61	Simone Edwards (17)	Campbell; S. Edwards; Vodičková (4)	Edna Campbell (3)	Gund Arena	1–5
7	June 13	Los Angeles	W 69-59 (OT)	Edna Campbell (22)	Simone Edwards (8)	Michelle Edwards (4)	KeyArena	2–5
8	June 15	Sacramento	L 50-54	Edna Campbell (17)	Kamila Vodičková (9)	Barnes; Henning; Lovelace (2)	KeyArena	2–6
9	June 18	Utah	L 53-56	Edna Campbell (21)	Simone Edwards (9)	Edwards; Henning (2)	KeyArena	2–7
10	June 20	@ Utah	L 63-66	Edna Campbell (17)	Michelle Edwards (5)	Sonja Henning (5)	Delta Center	2–8
11	June 23	@ Portland	L 61-72	Katrina Hibbert (22)	Kamila Vodičková (5)	Michelle Edwards (5)	Rose Garden	2–9
12	June 28	Detroit	L 78-82	Kamila Vodičková (22)	Henning; Vodičková (4)	M. Edwards; Henning (10)	KeyArena	2–10
13	June 30	Minnesota	L 53-65	Kamila Vodičková (15)	Andrea Garner (5)	M. Edwards; Garner; Henning (2)	KeyArena	2–11

July: 2–12 (Home: 1–6; Road: 1–6)

Game	Date	Team	Score	High points	High rebounds	High assists	Location Attendance	Record
14	July 1	Utah	L 60-81	Robin Threatt-Elliott (22)	Garner; Redd; Threatt-Elliott (4)	Charmin Smith (6)	KeyArena	2–12
15	July 3	Washington	L 55-60	Simone Edwards (14)	S. Edwards; Garner; Threatt-Elliott (4)	Michelle Edwards (5)	KeyArena	2–13
16	July 5	@ Lynx	W 67-60	Robin Threatt-Elliott (24)	Andrea Garner (7)	Sonja Henning (4)	Target Center	3–13
17	July 6	@ Houston	L 50-80	Charisse Sampson (12)	S. Edwards; Garner (5)	Katrina Hibbert (3)	Compaq Center	3–14
18	July 8	@ Orlando	L 53-64	Simone Edwards (18)	Charisse Sampson (7)	Charmin Smith (5)	TD Waterhouse Centre	3–15
19	July 10	@ Miami	L 42-59	Stacey Lovelace (11)	Simone Edwards (5)	Charmin Smith (2)	American Airlines Arena	3–16
20	July 12	@ Detroit	L 56-61	Jamie Redd (17)	Andrea Garner (7)	Robin Threatt-Elliott (3)	The Palace of Auburn Hills	3–17
21	July 14	@ Indiana	L 45-64	Robin Threatt-Elliott (13)	Sonja Henning (5)	Henning; Sampson (2)	Conseco Fieldhouse	3–18
22	July 19	New York	L 55-78	Barnes; Vodičková (12)	Michelle Edwards (4)	Campbell; Smith (3)	KeyArena	3–19
23	July 21	Minnesota	W 67-61	Edna Campbell (17)	Charisse Sampson (6)	Sonja Henning (4)	KeyArena	4–19
24	July 25	Minnesota	L 53-79	Sonja Henning (10)	Kamila Vodičková (6)	Edna Campbell (3)	Compaq Center	4–20
25	July 27	@ Los Angeles	L 63-76	Sonja Henning (19)	Sampson; Vodičková (5)	Edna Campbell (6)	Great Western Forum	4–21
26	July 28	Phoenix	L 55-65	Edna Campbell (14)	Andrea Garner (6)	Charmin Smith (7)	KeyArena	4–22
27	July 30	Miami	L 51-64	Quacy Barnes (16)	Sonja Henning (7)	Sonja Henning (4)	KeyArena	4–23

August: 2–3 (Home: 2–1; Road: 0–2)

Game	Date	Team	Score	High points	High rebounds	High assists	Location Attendance	Record
28	August 1	Indiana	W 66-60	Robin Threatt-Elliott (19)	S. Edwards; Garner (5)	Sonja Henning (6)	KeyArena	5–23
29	August 3	@ Phoenix	L 63-85	Quacy Barnes (17)	Michelle Edwards (5)	Michelle Edwards (4)	America West Arena	5–24
30	August 6	Portland	W 66-58 (OT)	Jamie Redd (14)	Quacy Barnes (8)	Barnes; Henning; Redd (3)	KeyArena	6–24
31	August 8	Los Angeles	L 52-60 (OT)	Michelle Edwards (20)	Michelle Edwards (6)	Sonja Henning (4)	KeyArena	6–25
32	August 9	@ Sacramento	L 46-79	Jamie Redd (14)	Simone Edwards (4)	Charmin Smith (3)	ARCO Arena	6–26

=== Season standings ===
Western Conference	W	L	PCT	Conf.	GB
Los Angeles Sparks ^{x}	28	4	.875	17–4	–
Houston Comets ^{x}	27	5	.844	17–4	1.0
Sacramento Monarchs ^{x}	21	11	.656	13–8	7.0
Phoenix Mercury ^{x}	20	12	.625	11–10	8.0
Utah Starzz ^{o}	18	14	.563	13–8	10.0
Minnesota Lynx ^{o}	15	17	.469	5–16	13.0
Portland Fire ^{o}	10	22	.313	4–17	18.0
Seattle Storm ^{o}	6	26	.188	4–17	22.0

== Statistics ==
Legend
GP	Games played	GS	Games started	MPG	Minutes per game	RPG	Rebounds per game
APG	Assists per game	SPG	Steals per game	BPG	Blocks per game	PPG	Points per game
FG%	Field-goal percentage	3P%	3-point field-goal percentage	FT%	Free-throw percentage	TO	Turnovers per game
PF	Fouls per game		Team leader		League leader

=== Regular season ===
Player	GP	GS	MPG	FG%	3P%	FT%	RPG	APG	SPG	BPG	PPG
Edna Campbell	16	16	31.9	.391	.265	.707	2.1	2.3	1.2	0.3	13.9
Sonja Henning	32	32	30.6	.351	.379	.607	2.7	2.5	1.9	0.1	5.3
Michelle Edwards	20	13	22.8	.357	.188	.657	1.7	2.0	0.7	0.3	6.6
Quacy Barnes	31	23	22.7	.418	.111	.536	2.7	1.1	0.6	1.1	6.7
Simone Edwards	29	7	22.2	.456	N/A	.625	3.7	0.8	0.6	0.3	7.4
Kamila Vodičková	23	19	21.3	.398	.200	.769	4.2	1.0	0.6	0.5	8.7
Robin Threatt-Elliott	20	7	18.9	.382	.324	.657	1.6	0.9	0.7	0.2	7.8
Andrea Garner	32	19	17.5	.322	.500	.632	3.0	0.8	0.8	0.3	3.1
Charmin Smith	32	3	16.1	.286	.313	.556	1.5	1.7	0.5	0.1	1.6
Jamie Redd	26	8	14.9	.392	.346	.706	1.7	0.6	0.7	0.0	5.4
Stacey Lovelace	23	1	14.1	.350	.222	.806	2.5	0.7	0.6	0.1	4.3
Charisse Sampson	21	6	13.3	.468	.391	.893	2.0	0.5	0.9	0.3	3.7
Katrina Hibbert	20	6	12.0	.322	.258	.778	1.5	0.9	0.4	0.1	2.7
Angela Aycock	1	0	7.0	.000	.000	N/A	2.0	0.0	0.0	0.0	0.0

^{‡}Waived/Released during the season
^{†}Traded during the season
^{≠}Acquired during the season
