= 2000 WNBA expansion draft =

3rd WNBA expansion draft

General information
- Sport: Basketball
- Date: December 15, 1999

Overview
- League: WNBA
- Expansion teams: Indiana Fever; Miami Sol; Portland Fire; Seattle Storm

The Women's National Basketball Association (WNBA) held their third expansion draft on December 15, 1999 for four new WNBA teams, the Indiana Fever, the Miami Sol, the Portland Fire, and the Seattle Storm. This draft allowed the four new expansion teams to select players from the existing WNBA teams to fill their debut rosters prior to the start of the 2000 WNBA season.

The four new teams were given six draft picks each to help stock their new rosters. The draft order was determined by a random drawing. The existing 12 WNBA teams were allowed to protect a total of five players from their 1999 rosters. However, once an existing team had a player selected in this draft, the team could then protect an additional three players from the expansion draft. No players were allocated by the league as "there [weren't] four players of equal ability out there to allocate."

== Key ==
| Pos. | G | F | C |
| Position | Guard | Forward | Center |

| ^ | Denotes player who has been inducted to the Women's Basketball Hall of Fame |
| * | Denotes player who has been selected for at least one All-Star Game and All-WNBA Team |
| ^{+} | Denotes player who has been selected for at least one All-Star Game |
| ^{#} | Denotes player who never played in the WNBA regular season or playoffs |

== Expansion draft ==
The following players were drafted for the rosters of the Fever, Sol, Fire, and Storm from the league's existing teams on December 15, 1999:

| Pick | Player | Position | Nationality | Team | Former team | WNBA years (Note: Number of years played in the WNBA prior to the draft) | Career with the franchise (Note: Number of years played for expansion franchise that drafted player) | Ref. |
|---|---|---|---|---|---|---|---|---|
| 1 | Gordana Grubin | G | (Federal Republic of Yugoslavia) FR Yugoslavia | Indiana Fever | Los Angeles Sparks | 1 | 2000–2001 | |
| 2 | Edna Campbell | G | United States | Seattle Storm | Phoenix Mercury | 1 | 2000 | |
| 3 | Kate Starbird (traded to Utah) (Note: December 15, 1999 trade: Miami to Utah: Starbird and a 2000 first-round pick (8th overall) were acquired by the Utah Starzz from Miami Sol; In exchange, Miami received Elena Baranova and a 2000 second-round pick (19th overall)) | G | United States | Miami Sol | Sacramento Monarchs | 1 | — | |
| 4 | Alisa Burras | F | United States | Portland Fire | Cleveland Rockers | 1 | 2000–2002 | |
| 5 | Sophia Witherspoon | G | United States | Portland Fire | New York Liberty | 3 | 2000–2001 | |
| 6 | Stephanie McCarty (traded to Indiana) (Note: December 15, 1999 trade: Miami to Indiana: McCarty was acquired by the Indiana Fever from Miami Sol; In exchange, Miami received Brondello and a 2000 first-round pick (10th overall)) | G | United States | Miami Sol | Charlotte Sting | 1 | — | |
| 7 | Sonja Henning | G | United States | Seattle Storm | Houston Comets | 1 | 2000–2002 | |
| 8 | Sandy Brondello ^{+} (traded to Miami) | G | Australia | Indiana Fever | Detroit Shock | 2 | — | |
| 9 | Nyree Roberts (Note: December 15, 1999 trade: Washington to Indiana: Monica Maxwell and a 2000 fourth-round pick (50th overall) was acquired by the Indiana Fever from the Washington Mystic; In exchange, Indiana agreed to select Roberts in this expansion draft from the Washington Mystics) | C | United States | Indiana Fever | Washington Mystics | 2 | — | |
| 10 | Angela Aycock | F | United States | Seattle Storm | Minnesota Lynx | 1 | 2000 | |
| 11 | Debbie Black | G | United States | Miami Sol | Utah Starzz | 1 | 2000–2002 | |
| 12 | Tari Phillips * | C | United States | Portland Fire | Orlando Miracle | 1 | — | |
| 13 | Coquese Washington | G | United States | Portland Fire | New York Liberty | 2 | — | |
| 14 | Sharon Manning | F | United States | Miami Sol | Charlotte Sting | 3 | 2000 | |
| 15 | Nina Bjedov | C | (Federal Republic of Yugoslavia) FR Yugoslavia | Seattle Storm | Los Angeles Sparks | 1 | — | |
| 16 | Rita Williams ^{+} | G | United States | Indiana Fever | Washington Mystics | 2 | 2000–2002 | |
| 17 | Kara Wolters ^ | C | United States | Indiana Fever | Houston Comets | 1 | 2000 | |
| 18 | Toni Foster | F | United States | Seattle Storm | Phoenix Mercury | 3 | — | |
| 19 | Lesley Brown | F | United States | Miami Sol | Detroit Shock | 1 | — | |
| 20 | Molly Goodenbour ^{#} | G | United States | Portland Fire | Sacramento Monarchs | 0 | — | |
| 21 | Jamila Wideman | G | United States | Portland Fire | Cleveland Rockers | 3 | 2000 | |
| 22 | Yolanda Moore | F | United States | Miami Sol | Orlando Miracle | 3 | — | |
| 23 | Charmin Smith | G | United States | Seattle Storm | Minnesota Lynx | 1 | 2000–2001 | |
| 24 | Chantel Tremitiere | G | United States | Indiana Fever | Utah Starzz | 3 | 2000 | |
