= 1998 Sacramento Monarchs season =

- Head coach: Heidi VanDerveer
- Arena: ARCO Arena

Results
- Record: 8–22 (.267)
- Place: 4th (Western)
- Playoff finish: Did not qualify

The 1998 WNBA season was the 2nd season for the Sacramento Monarchs. The team tied with the Utah Starzz for the worst record in the Western Conference.

== Transactions ==
=== Detroit Shock expansion draft ===
The following player was selected in the Detroit Shock expansion draft from the Sacramento Monarchs:

Player	Nationality	School/Team/Country
Tajama Abraham	United States	George Washington

=== WNBA draft ===
Round	Pick	Player	Nationality	School/Team/Country
1	2	Ticha Penicheiro	United States	Old Dominion
2	12	Tangela Smith	United States	Iowa
3	22	Quacy Barnes	United States	Indiana
4	32	Adia Barnes	United States	Arizona

=== Transactions ===
Date	Transaction
February 18, 1998	Lost Tajama Abraham to the Detroit Shock in the WNBA expansion draft
April 9, 1998	Traded Pamela McGee to the Los Angeles Sparks in exchange for Linda Burgess
April 29, 1998	Drafted Ticha Penicheiro, Tangela Smith, Quacy Barnes and Adia Barnes in the 1998 WNBA draft
May 5, 1998	Traded Chantel Tremitiere to the Utah Starzz in exchange for Lady Hardmon
May 25, 1998	Waived Denique Graves
June 1, 1998	Waived Margold Clark
June 9, 1998	Waived Corissa Yasen and Danielle Viglione
June 30, 1998	Signed Rehema Stephens
July 6, 1998	Traded Tiffani Johnson to the Phoenix Mercury in exchange for Pauline Jordan
July 24, 1998	Waived Rehema Stephens
July 27, 1998	Signed Nadine Domond

== Roster ==
1998 Sacramento Monarchs roster
Players
Coaches

Pos.	No.	Nat.	Name	Height	Weight	DOB	From	Yrs
F	32	(United States)	Barnes, Adia	5' 11" (1.8m)	165 lb (75kg)	1977-02-03	Arizona	R
C	0	(United States)	Barnes, Quacy	6' 5" (1.96m)	185 lb (84kg)	1976-09-26	Indiana	R
G	6	(United States)	Bolton, Ruthie	5' 9" (1.75m)	150 lb (68kg)	1967-05-27	Auburn	1
F	42	(United States)	Burgess, Linda	6' 1" (1.85m)	173 lb (78kg)	1969-07-27	Alabama	1
G/F	51	(United States)	Byears, Latasha	5' 11" (1.8m)	206 lb (93kg)	1973-08-12	DePaul	1
G	3	(United States)	Domond, Nadine	5' 7" (1.7m)	148 lb (67kg)	1975-09-28	Iowa	R
F	30	(United States)	Gordon, Bridgette	6' 0" (1.83m)	172 lb (78kg)	1967-04-27	Tennessee	1
F	27	(United States)	Hardmon, Lady	5' 10" (1.78m)	160 lb (73kg)	1970-09-12	Georgia	1
C	4	(United States)	Johnson, Tiffani	6' 4" (1.93m)	240 lb (109kg)	1975-12-27	Tennessee	R
F/C	11	(United States)	Jordan, Pauline	6' 3" (1.91m)	205 lb (93kg)	1968-04-27	UNLV	R
G	21	(Portugal)	Penicheiro, Ticha	5' 11" (1.8m)	146 lb (66kg)	1974-09-18	Old Dominion	R
G	25	(United States)	Price, Franthea	5' 9" (1.75m)	178 lb (81kg)	1968-04-28	Iowa	R
C	50	(United States)	Smith, Tangela	6' 3" (1.91m)	158 lb (72kg)	1977-04-01	Iowa	R
G	3	(United States)	Stephens, Rehema	5' 11" (1.8m)		1969-12-28	UCLA	R

Head coach
(United States) Heidi VanDerveer (College of Charleston)
Assistant coaches
(United States) Jill Jackson
(United States) Yvette Angel
(United States) Drew Peterson

Legend

- (C) Team captain
- (DP) Unsigned draft pick
- (FA) Free agent
- (S) Suspended
- Injured

== Schedule ==
=== Regular season ===
1998 game log
Total: 9–21 (Home: 6–10; Road: 3–11)
June: 2–6 (Home: 2–3; Road: 0–3)

Game	Date	Team	Score	High points	High rebounds	High assists	Location Attendance	Record
1	June 11	Phoenix	L 70–73	Ruthie Bolton (15)	Linda Burgess (10)	Ticha Penicheiro (5)	ARCO Arena	0–1
2	June 16	Los Angeles	W 73–69	Latasha Byears (21)	Burgess; Byears (6)	Ticha Penicheiro (8)	ARCO Arena	1–1
3	June 18	New York	L 48–64	Latasha Byears (10)	Tangela Smith (5)	Ticha Penicheiro (3)	ARCO Arena	1–2
4	June 20	Houston	L 68–79	Ruthie Bolton (17)	Latasha Byears (6)	Ticha Penicheiro (7)	ARCO Arena	1–3
5	June 23	@ Detroit	L 57–61	Linda Burgess (13)	Burgess; Penicheiro (6)	Ticha Penicheiro (5)	The Palace of Auburn Hills	1–4
6	June 26	@ New York	L 48–62	Ticha Penicheiro (10)	Penicheiro; Smith (7)	Ticha Penicheiro (4)	Madison Square Garden	1–5
7	June 27	@ Charlotte	L 50–58	Bridgette Gordon (12)	Lady Hardmon (8)	Ticha Penicheiro (8)	Charlotte Coliseum	1–6
8	June 30	Los Angeles	W 58–56	Latasha Byears (13)	Latasha Byears (11)	Penicheiro; Price (3)	ARCO Arena	2–6

July: 4–10 (Home: 2–4; Road: 2–6)

Game	Date	Team	Score	High points	High rebounds	High assists	Location Attendance	Record
9	July 3	@ Houston	L 67–84	Latasha Byears (15)	Latasha Byears (7)	Ticha Penicheiro (5)	Compaq Center	2–7
10	July 5	Utah	W 70–66	Latasha Byears (21)	Linda Burgess (7)	Ticha Penicheiro (7)	ARCO Arena	3–7
11	July 6	@ Utah	L 64–68	Franthea Price (14)	Linda Burgess (8)	Ticha Penicheiro (10)	Delta Center	3–8
12	July 8	Los Angeles	W 76–71	Tangela Smith (20)	Byears; Penicheiro; Smith (6)	Ticha Penicheiro (11)	ARCO Arena	4–8
13	July 10	Charlotte	L 55–63	Latasha Byears (16)	Latasha Byears (11)	Ticha Penicheiro (9)	ARCO Arena	4–9
14	July 14	Cleveland	L 58–61	Latasha Byears (16)	Tangela Smith (7)	Ticha Penicheiro (11)	ARCO Arena	4–10
15	July 15	@ Los Angeles	L 76–81 (OT)	Latasha Byears (16)	Latasha Byears (13)	Ticha Penicheiro (12)	Great Western Forum	4–11
16	July 18	Houston	L 44–75	Latasha Byears (16)	Lady Hardmon (8)	Ticha Penicheiro (10)	ARCO Arena	4–12
17	July 20	@ Phoenix	L 67–88	Latasha Byears (28)	Latasha Byears (8)	Ticha Penicheiro (7)	America West Arena	4–13
18	July 24	New York	L 54–76	Latasha Byears (13)	Latasha Byears (5)	Barnes; Penicheiro (3)	ARCO Arena	4–14
19	July 26	@ Washington	W 79–65	Adia Barnes (15)	Pauline Jordan (9)	Ticha Penicheiro (8)	MCI Center	5–14
20	July 27	@ Charlotte	W 76–70	Latasha Byears (18)	Tangela Smith (10)	Ticha Penicheiro (12)	Charlotte Coliseum	6–14
21	July 29	@ Cleveland	L 67–75	Latasha Byears (23)	Byears; Penicheiro (6)	Ticha Penicheiro (16)	Gund Arena	6–15
22	July 31	@ Detroit	L 77–78	Tangela Smith (26)	Latasha Byears (8)	Ticha Penicheiro (9)	The Palace of Auburn Hills	6–16

August: 3–5 (Home: 2–3; Road: 1–2)

Game	Date	Team	Score	High points	High rebounds	High assists	Location Attendance	Record
23	August 2	@ Houston	L 53–70	Latasha Byears (15)	Byears; Smith (6)	Domond; Penicheiro (3)	Compaq Center	6–17
24	August 4	Cleveland	L 60–72	Tangela Smith (17)	Latasha Byears (9)	Ticha Penicheiro (6)	ARCO Arena	6–18
25	August 7	Washington	W 76–55	Tangela Smith (19)	Latasha Byears (10)	Ticha Penicheiro (13)	ARCO Arena	7–18
26	August 11	Detroit	L 41–50	Latasha Byears (16)	Latasha Byears (8)	Ticha Penicheiro (7)	ARCO Arena	7–19
27	August 12	@ Utah	L 71–81	Lady Hardmon (14)	Lady Hardmon (6)	Latasha Byears (4)	Delta Center	7–20
28	August 15	Utah	W 82–55	Linda Burgess (33)	Ticha Penicheiro (14)	Ticha Penicheiro (6)	ARCO Arena	8–20
29	August 16	Phoenix	L 69–85	Adia Barnes (24)	Ticha Penicheiro (8)	Ticha Penicheiro (9)	ARCO Arena	8–21
30	August 19	@ Phoenix	L 62–71	Latasha Byears (18)	Latasha Byears (11)	Ticha Penicheiro (5)	America West Arena	8–22

1998 season schedule

=== Season standings ===
Western Conference	W	L	PCT	Conf.	GB
Houston Comets ^{x}	27	3	.900	15–1	–
Phoenix Mercury ^{x}	19	11	.633	10–6	8.0
Los Angeles Sparks ^{o}	12	18	.400	6–10	15.0
Sacramento Monarchs ^{o}	8	22	.267	5–11	19.0
Utah Starzz ^{o}	8	22	.267	4–12	19.0

== Statistics ==
Legend
GP	Games played	GS	Games started	MPG	Minutes per game	RPG	Rebounds per game
APG	Assists per game	SPG	Steals per game	BPG	Blocks per game	PPG	Points per game
FG%	Field-goal percentage	3P%	3-point field-goal percentage	FT%	Free-throw percentage	TO	Turnovers per game
PF	Fouls per game		Team leader		League leader

=== Regular season ===
Player	GP	GS	MPG	FG%	3P%	FT%	RPG	APG	SPG	BPG	PPG
Ticha Penichiero	30	30	36.0	.333	.233	.642	4.7	7.5	2.2	0.1	6.3
Latasha Byears	30	26	27.6	.454	.222	.663	6.6	1.0	1.4	0.4	14.2
Ruthie Bolton	5	4	26.6	.293	.154	.607	2.2	1.2	1.2	0.0	11.0
Lady Hardmon	30	29	26.4	.487	.167	.670	2.7	1.6	0.7	0.1	7.1
Tangela Smith	28	10	25.3	.401	.357	.741	4.6	1.0	0.6	1.6	9.6
Linda Burgess	30	29	23.1	.471	.125	.763	4.9	0.9	1.4	0.4	7.5
Adia Barnes	29	16	21.3	.395	.298	.744	2.9	0.8	0.5	0.3	7.6
Franthea Price	26	1	14.6	.374	.359	.722	1.7	1.3	0.8	0.1	4.9
Pauline Jordan	18	0	13.7	.344	.000	.607	2.4	1.0	0.7	0.7	3.3
Bridgette Gordon	22	5	11.5	.391	.000	.563	1.3	0.4	0.4	0.0	2.7
Nadine Domond	9	0	10.2	.303	.188	1.000	1.0	1.0	1.0	0.1	3.0
Rehema Stephens	8	0	10.1	.268	.167	.500	1.3	0.5	0.5	0.1	3.3
Quacy Barnes	17	0	5.3	.400	N/A	.364	0.5	0.1	0.1	0.4	0.9
Tiffani Johnson	6	0	5.3	.000	N/A	.500	1.7	0.0	0.0	0.0	0.3

^{‡}Waived/Released during the season
^{†}Traded during the season
^{≠}Acquired during the season
