= Bonnie Henrickson =

American basketball coach (born 1963)

Biographical details
- Born: April 13, 1963 (age 63); Willmar, Minnesota, U.S.

Playing career
- 1982–1986: St. Cloud State

Coaching career (HC unless noted)
- 1986–1988: Western Illinois (GA)
- 1988–1995: Virginia Tech (asst.)
- 1995–1997: Iowa (asst.)
- 1997–2004: Virginia Tech
- 2004–2015: Kansas
- 2015–2024: UC Santa Barbara

Head coaching record
- Overall: 465–376 (.553)

Accomplishments and honors

Awards
- Carol Eckman Award winner (2005); Atlantic 10 Coach of the Year (1999)
Medal record
Women's basketball
Head Coach for United States
William Jones Cup
Gold medal – first place	2000 Taipei	Team competition
Assistant Coach for United States
World University Games
Silver medal – second place	1999 Palma de Mallorca	Team competition

Bonnie Henrickson (born April 13, 1963) is the former head women's college basketball coach at the University of California, Santa Barbara. Prior to becoming the head coach at UC Santa Barbara, Henrickson was the head coach at the University of Kansas from 2004 to 2015, combining a record of 186–171, and before Kansas, Henrickson was the head coach at Virginia Tech, where she led the Hokies to a 158–62 record, including seven post-season appearances.

== Biography ==
Henrickson is a native of Willmar, Minnesota. She has four siblings. She graduated from St. Cloud State University in 1986. When playing at SCSU, she helped win three Northern Sun Conference championships and advance to three NCAA Division II quarterfinals. In her four years at SCSU, they compiled a 97–25 record, including a 31–4 record in her sophomore season. She has records at SCSU in total points scored (4th – 1,731), rebounds (3rd – 995), free throws (1st – 507) and free throw percentage (4th – .790). She also was named to the All-Conference Team three times. Henrickson was a team captain her junior and senior years. She earned her master's degree in Physical Education in 1988 from Western Illinois University while holding a position as a graduate assistant coach with the women's basketball team.

=== Accolades ===
- 2005 Carol Eckman Award winner
- 2004–05 Kansas City Star honorable mention consideration for Big 12 Coach of the Year
- 2004 Virginia SID Coach of the Year
- 2003 head coach USA Jones Cup team (gold medal)
- 1999 National Coach of the Year finalist
- 1999 Atlantic 10 Coach of the Year
- 1999 assistant coach, USA World University

=== Team performance ===
- 8 postseason appearances
- Average 21 wins per season
- 2 conference championships
- 5 NCAA appearances (1998, 1999, 2001, 2003, 2004)
- 2 NCAA Sweet 16 appearance
- 3 WNBA draftees
- 14 All-Conference athletes
- 3 Academic All-Americans

== Coaching career ==
=== Virginia Tech (1997–2004) ===
Henrickson was head coach at Virginia Tech for seven years, where she guided the Hokies to a record of 158–62 and seven postseason appearances. Under her leadership, Virginia Tech reached the NCAA tournament five times, the WNIT twice and won 20 or more games every season. When Henrickson took over at Virginia Tech for the 1997–98 season, she orchestrated the biggest turnaround in school history. She guided her team to a 22–10 record, the school's first Atlantic 10 Conference title and an NCAA second-round appearance just one season after the Hokies had finished last in the Atlantic 10 Conference with a 10–21 record. In 2003–04, Henrickson led the Hokies to a 23–8 overall record, including a 10–6 mark in the Big East. Virginia Tech advanced to the second round of the NCAA tournament for the second-straight year before bowing out to No. 5 Penn State.

=== Kansas (2004–2015) ===
In her eleven years at the helm of the University of Kansas program, Henrickson had taken the Jayhawk program from the cellar of the Big 12 Conference to continually climbing toward the top of the league standings. In addition, KU has advanced to postseason play in six of her eight seasons, including in each of the last five years, highlighted by last season's NCAA Tournament Sweet 16 run.

With the best postseason effort by the Jayhawks since 1998, Henrickson guided Kansas to a 21–13 record during the 2011–12 season and NCAA Tournament victories over Nebraska (57–49) and Delaware (70–64), before falling to Tennessee in the Sweet 16. All-America honorable mention, All-Big 12 Second Team selection and the nation's assist leader Angel Goodrich led the way for the Jayhawks during the NCAA Tournament. KU also had All-America honorable mention and All-Big 12 First Team honoree Carolyn Davis for the first 23 games, before a knee injury sidelined her for the remainder of the season.

With more than just putting wins back on the record, Henrickson and her team set a Big 12 single-game attendance record when Kansas hosted South Florida in the 2009 WNIT Championship game, as 16,113 fans supported the KU women's basketball program in historic Allen Fieldhouse. KU finished the 2008–09 season ranked in the Top 25 on the NCAA attendance chart and ranked fourth in the country in attendance increase.

KU advanced to postseason play for the fourth-straight season and fifth time overall under Henrickson in 2010–11, as the Jayhawks advanced to the second round of the Women's NIT before falling to Duquesne. KU posted its second 20-win season under Henrickson and recorded 20 or more wins for the second time in the last three seasons as the Jayhawks concluded the 2010–11 season with a 21–13 overall record.

Kansas saw much of its success through Davis, a sophomore at the time, who averaged a team-leading 19.0 points, 7.4 rebounds and 1.4 blocks per game on her way to First Team All-Big 12 accolades. Davis led the Big 12 and ranked second nationally shooting 66.0 percent from the field. Additionally, KU saw the return from injury of Goodrich, who averaged 7.5 points, 6.3 assists and 1.7 steals per game on her way to being named a finalist for the V Foundation Comeback Award.

In 2009–10, Henrickson guided the Jayhawks to their first national ranking in a decade. Kansas appeared in the Associated Press Poll for nine-consecutive weeks to open the season, ranking as high as No. 18. Jayhawk senior guard Danielle McCray was named the 2009 Preseason Big 12 Player of the Year and was well on her way to All-America honors prior to suffering a season-ending knee injury in early February. The injury did not keep McCray from being drafted as she was the seventh overall selection in the 2010 WNBA Draft, becoming the first Kansas player to be taken in the draft under Henrickson. In addition, Davis was named a Freshman All-American and to the Big 12 All-Freshman Team.

Henrickson's 2008–09 squad had a "break-out" performance of sorts, demonstrating down the stretch of the season all the fruits of its labor. KU opened the season strong, compiling an 11–2 non-conference mark. The Jayhawks struggled early in Big 12 Conference play, opening with a 2–9 mark versus league opponents, before turning the corner. KU closed conference action winning four of its last five games, including wins over ranked teams No. 21 Iowa State and No. 5 Baylor. Kansas concluded the regular season with a 6–10 mark in Big 12 play, marking the most conference wins for Henrickson in her five seasons at KU. The Jayhawks' seventh-place finish was their highest in Henrickson's tenure.

The Jayhawks advanced to the WNIT for the second-consecutive season and third time under Henrickson, only this time they said they were more determined than ever to make all of their hard work pay off. KU reeled off four-straight wins, including a victory over Southeastern Conference member Arkansas and a win at New Mexico, argued to be one of the most notoriously tough places to play in all of the NCAA. They were out of the tournament after the title game with South Florida, Kansas finished the 2008–09 season with a 22–14 overall mark, giving the Jayhawks their most wins since the 1998–99 season.

In addition to the team having a break-through season, McCray burst onto the national scene with an eye-popping season of her own. McCray, who was named First Team All-Big 12, became the first Jayhawk since Lynn Pride in 1999 to earn All-America Honorable Mention honors as she was feted by both the Associated Press and State Farm. Additionally, she collected three Big 12 Player of the Week honors and was selected as an All-American Strength and Conditioning Athlete of the Year. Following the season, McCray was invited to try out for USA Basketball's World University Games Team. After becoming one of 12 players chosen for the team, she traveled to Belgrade, Serbia for the 2009 World University Games, where she helped lead the US to the gold medal.

Henrickson's 2007–08 squad posted a winning record, finishing the campaign with a 17–16 mark, while two players were honored by the league coaches with McCray being tabbed All-Big 12 Honorable Mention and center Krysten Boogaard appearing on the Big 12 All-Rookie Team. The Jayhawks advanced to postseason play for the second time in Henrickson's first four seasons with a trip to the WNIT.

Henrickson's young Jayhawk squad in 2006–07, consisting of seven freshmen and just two seniors, came on strong at the end of the year, winning five of their last seven games. Kelly Kohn and McCray each took home Big 12 newcomer awards as Kohn was the Big 12 Rookie of the Week (Dec. 17, 2006) and McCray was honored as a member of the Waco Tribune-Herald Big 12 All-Freshman Team.

A resurgence in Jayhawks' women's basketball was quite evident throughout the 2005–06 season as Henrickson's second campaign was capped off with a berth to the WNIT – KU's first postseason appearance since 2000. Under Henrickson's guidance that season, Kansas finished 17–13 to mark its first winning season in six years. Along the way, KU set a school record with 12-straight victories to open the season and snapped a 36-game drought against ranked opponents by defeating No. 23 Texas.

Using the qualities that earned her the 2005 Carol Eckman Award – an award given by the WBCA which recognizes a coach who exemplifies spirit, integrity and character through sportsmanship, commitment to the student-athlete, honesty, ethical behavior, courage and dedication to purpose—Henrickson developed Crystal Kemp and Erica Hallman into All-Big 12 selections for the second straight year.

In 2004–05, Kansas posted its most wins (12) and conference wins (five) in four seasons, and placed eighth in the Big 12 Conference—the highest Jayhawk finish in five years. In the process, Henrickson developed Kemp and Hallman into KU's first two All-Big 12 selections since 2000–01.

Henrickson and her staff not only guided their athletes to victories on the court, but many achieved tremendous accomplishments in the classroom at KU. Under Henrickson, the overall team GPA steadily rose since she arrived in Lawrence. During the 2007–08 school year, the Jayhawks achieved a team-record 3.11 GPA. In her eight seasons, the Jayhawks earned 27 Academic All-Big 12 Team appointments.

On March 9, 2015, Henrickson was fired. She compiled a record of 186–171 while at Kansas.

== Head coaching record ==
Record table
Season	Team	Overall	Conference	Standing	Postseason
Virginia Tech Hokies (Atlantic 10 Conference) (1997–2004)
1997–98	Virginia Tech	22–10	11–5	3rd	NCAA 2nd Round
1998–99	Virginia Tech	28–3	15–1	1st	NCAA Sweet Sixteen
1999–2000	Virginia Tech	20–11	11–5	3rd	WNIT second round
Virginia Tech (A10):		70–24 (.745)	37–11 (.771)		
Virginia Tech Hokies (Big East Conference) (2000–2004)
2000–01	Virginia Tech	22–9	11–5	4th	NCAA 2nd Round
2001–02	Virginia Tech	21–11	9–7	T-6th	WNIT Quarterfinals
2002–03	Virginia Tech	22–10	10–6	T-5th	NCAA 2nd Round
2003–04	Virginia Tech	23–8	10–6	T-6th	NCAA 2nd Round
Virginia Tech (Big East):		88–38 (.698)	40–24 (.625)		
Virginia Tech (Overall):		158–62 (.718)			
Kansas Jayhawks (Big 12 Conference) (2004–2015)
2004–05	Kansas	12–16	5–11	8th	
2005–06	Kansas	17–13	5–11	10th	WNIT first round
2006–07	Kansas	11–20	4–12	T-11th	
2007–08	Kansas	17–16	4–12	T-10th	WNIT Third round
2008–09	Kansas	22–14	6–10	T-7th	WNIT Finals
2009–10	Kansas	17–16	5–11	T-8th	WNIT Third round
2010–11	Kansas	21–13	6–10	T-8th	WNIT Second round
2011–12	Kansas	21–13	8–10	T-6th	NCAA Sweet Sixteen
2012–13	Kansas	20–14	8–10	7th	NCAA Sweet Sixteen
2013–14	Kansas	13–19	5–13	T-8th	
2014–15	Kansas	15–17	6–12	9th	
Kansas:		186–171 (.521)	62–121 (.339)		
UC Santa Barbara (Big West Conference) (2015–2024)
2015–16	UC Santa Barbara	12–20	8–8	5th	
2016–17	UC Santa Barbara	16–16	9–7	T-4th	
2017–18	UC Santa Barbara	12–17	9–7	4th	
2018–19	UC Santa Barbara	8–22	5–11	T–7th	
2019–20	UC Santa Barbara	14–15	9–7	2nd	
2020–21	UC Santa Barbara	7–19	7–9	7th	
2021–22	UC Santa Barbara	15–12	9–8	6th	
2022–23	UC Santa Barbara	21–12	12–8	5th	
2023–24	UC Santa Barbara	16–15	10–10	6th	
UC Santa Barbara:		121–143 (.458)	78–60 (.565)		
Total:		465–376 (.553)			
National champion Postseason invitational champion Conference regular season champion Conference regular season and conference tournament champion Division regular season champion Division regular season and conference tournament champion Conference tournament champion

== USA Basketball ==
Henrickson served as an assistant coach, under head coach Rene Portland, of the USA representative to the 1999 World University Games (also known as the Universiade). The event was held in Palma de Mallorca, Spain. The USA team won their opening two games easily, including a mismatch against South Africa with a final score of 140–32, but lost against Ukraine, 81–70. They earned a position in the medal rounds and defeated Lithuania in the quarterfinals. USA then took on undefeated Russia and won a close game 87–79, setting up the championship game between the USA and host Spain. After falling behind early, the USA team kept the game close, and got within five points with under two minutes to go, but Spain held on to win the gold medal. The USA team received the silver medal.

Henrickson was named head coach of the team representing the USA in 2000 at the William Jones Cup competition in Taipei, Taiwan. The USA team started strong with a 32-point win over the host team, the Republic of China National Team. They then beat South Korea easily and faced Japan in the third game. Japan started out strongly, and had an 18-point lead in the first half. The USA then out scored Japan 23–3 to take a small lead at the half. The USA built a ten-point lead, but Japan cut it back to three with under a minute to go. Kelly Schumacher grabbed an offensive rebound and scored to bring the lead back to five points and the team held on for the win. Schumacher had 24 points to help the USA team beat Japan 83–80. The final game was against Malaysia, but it wasn't close, with the USA winning 79–24, to secure a 4–0 record for the competition and the gold medal.
