= Basket Alcamo =

Italian women's basketball team

The Amateur Association Basket Alcamo is the main female basketball team from Alcamo. The team plays at the stadium Palazzetto Tre Santi and the uniform is white and blue.

== History ==
Previously known as Sport Club Alcamo, the team played in Serie A already in 1996.

Basket Alcamo was founded by professor Lino Scalzo.

Numerous notable athletes played for this team, including Angela Aycock, Cynthia Cooper, Lisa Leslie, Francesca Zara and Susanna Stabile. In 1996 the Sport Club Alcamo reaches the final of the Ronchetti Cup.

== Stadium ==
The team plays at the 'PalaTreSanti. Built in 1990, it holds 1000 spectators. In the past hosted Universiades matches and in 2009 hosted many Basketball Trapani matches.

== Notable players ==
- Angela Aycock
- Cynthia Cooper
- Lisa Leslie
- Tari Phillips
- Francesca Zara
- Susanna Stabile
- Diāna Skrastiņa
- Roli-Ann Nikagbatse
- Karolina Piotrkiewicz
- Zsuzsa Tarnai
- Andra Simina Mandache
- Anna Caliendo
