= Kansas Jayhawks women's basketball =

2026–27 Kansas Jayhawks women's basketball team
- University: University of Kansas
- First season: 1903; 123 years ago (club); 1968 (varsity)
- Athletic director: Travis Goff
- Head coach: Brandon Schneider (12th season)
- Location: Lawrence, Kansas
- Arena: Allen Fieldhouse (capacity: 16,300)
- Conference: Big 12
- Nickname: Jayhawks
- Colors: Crimson and blue
- All-time record: 865–696 (.554) (Varsity-only record)

NCAA Division I tournament Sweet Sixteen
- 1996, 1998, 2012, 2013

NCAA Division I tournament appearances
- 1987, 1988, 1992, 1993, 1994, 1995, 1996, 1997, 1998, 1999, 2000, 2012, 2013, 2022, 2024

AIAW tournament second round
- 1980

AIAW tournament appearances
- 1979, 1980, 1981

Conference tournament champions
- 1979, 1980, 1981, 1987, 1988, 1993

Conference regular-season champions
- 1987, 1992, 1996, 1997

Uniforms
Home	Away	Alternate

The Kansas Jayhawks women's basketball team represents the University of Kansas and competes in the Big 12 Conference of NCAA Division I. The Jayhawks are coached by Brandon Schneider. The Jayhawks have failed to match the success of the men's team, only qualifying for 14 NCAA Tournaments and never making it past the Sweet Sixteen. They have, however, won one Women's NIT championship, in 2023. Despite the lack of success on the court, the Jayhawks have produced one Naismith Memorial Basketball Hall of Famer, Lynette Woodard.

== History ==
The 1903 KU women's basketball team

In 1897, the University of Kansas commencement program featured an excerpt from a graduate named Lola Bell Brown. The excerpt explains that Brown was being included "for her work on the basketball court at Kansas", and "she helped bring basketball to KU for girls." Several female students asked Dr. Naismith if they could form a team upon witnessing his new game. It is reported that he responded with enthusiasm and support. Naismith would later coach the women's team for a single season. A week later, it was being played in physical education classes by both men and women. Six years later, in 1903, the University of Kansas fielded their first women's basketball team. The 1903 team posted a 6-2 record. The team competed as a non-varsity independent squad. In 1912, female students at the University of Kansas launched the Women’s Athletic Association (WAA) with the assistance of physical education instructor Hazel Pratt. Under the WAA, KU women competed against other colleges and universities as a non-varsity club sport. This continued for several decades until women's basketball became a varsity sport in 1968. Kansas first officially fielded a varsity women's basketball team during the 1968–1969 season, though club level women's teams had been fielded as early as 1903. For 31 seasons (1973–2004) the women's team was coached by Marian Washington, who led the team to three Big Eight championships, 11 NCAA Tournament appearances and three AIAW tournament appearances. The team's best post-season result was appearing in the Sweet Sixteen, which they have done five times, most recently in 2013.

== Notable players ==
The Jayhawks have produced one Hall of Fame player. As of April 2, 2023, Kansas has no players on WNBA rosters, but has produced WNBA players in the past.

=== Hall of Famers ===
- Lynette Woodard, inducted as a player, also a former coach

=== Former WNBA players ===
- Angela Aycock, forward, Seattle Storm
- Tamecka Dixon, guard, Los Angeles Sparks
- Angel Goodrich, guard, Tulsa Shock
- Danielle McCray, guard/forward, Connecticut Sun
- Lynn Pride, guard/forward, Minnesota Lynx
- Charisse Sampson, guard, Seattle Storm

== Conferences ==
The Jayhawks and the rest of the Big 8, along with four former members of the defunct Southwest Conference, joined and created the Big 12 conference in 1996.

== Coaches ==
Kansas first fielded a women's basketball team in 1903. The Jayhawks were coached by the inventor of the game James Naismith. After the 1903 season, and until becoming a varsity team in 1968, the Jayhawks did not officially have a coach, and instead had "player-coaches" on their rosters. The Jayhawks have had six coaches since they began Varsity play in 1968. Marian Washington is all-time leader for the program in years coached, wins, tournament appearances, tournament wins, and win percentage.

Coach	Years coached	Wins	Losses	Win %	App.	Wins	Loss.	Win %
Marlene Mawson	1968–1971	19	16	.543	N/A*			
Debbie Artman	1971–1972	9	8	.529	0	0	0	—
Sharon Drysdale	1972–1973	9	8	.529	0	0	0	—
Marian Washington	1973–2004	560	365	.605	14	10	14	.417
Bonnie Henrickson	2004–2015	186	171	.521	2	4	2	.667
Brandon Schneider	2015–present	107	136	.440	1	1	1	.500

* Women's college post-season tournaments did not begin until 1969, with a CIAW invitational tournament. Kansas appeared in the 1971 CIAW post-season qualification tournament with a record of 2-2.

== Postseason ==
=== NCAA Division I ===
The Jayhawks have appeared in the NCAA Division I women's basketball tournament fourteen times. Their record is 15–14.

Year	Seed	Round	Opponent	Result
1987	7	First Round; Second Round	(10) NE Louisiana (2) Georgia	W 78–72; L 51–82
1988	7	First Round; Second Round	(10) Middle Tennessee St. (2) Louisiana Tech	W 81–75; L 50–89
1992	9	First Round	(8) Missouri St.	L 59–75
1993	8	First Round	(9) California	L 47–62
1994	9	First Round; Second Round	(8) Stephen F. Austin (1) Penn State	W 72–67; L 68–85
1995	7	First Round	(10) Wisconsin	L 72–73
1996	4	First Round; Second Round; Sweet 16	(13) Middle Tennessee St. (5) Texas (1) Tennessee	W 72–57; W 70–77; L 71–92
1997	3	First Round; Second Round	(14) Detroit (6) Vanderbilt	W 81–67; L 44–51
1998	5	First Round; Second Round; Sweet 16	(12) Tulane (4) Iowa (9) Arkansas	W 72–68; W 62–58; L 63–79
1999	9	First Round; Second Round	(8) Marquette (1) Purdue	W 64–58; L 41–55
2000	8	First Round	(9) Vanderbilt	L 69–71 ^{2 OT}
2012	11	First Round; Second Round; Sweet 16	(6) Nebraska (3) Delaware (2) Tennessee	W 57–49; W 70–64; L 73–84
2013	12	First Round; Second Round; Sweet 16	(5) Colorado (4) South Carolina (1) Notre Dame	W 67–52; W 75–69; L 63–93
2022	8	First Round; Second Round	(9) Georgia Tech (1) Stanford	W 77–58; L 65–91
2024	8	First Round; Second Round	(9) Michigan (1) USC	W 81–72 ^{OT} L 55–73

=== AIAW ===
Kansas reached the AIAW Women's Basketball Tournament three times. They had a record of 1–3.

Year	Seed	Round	Opponent	Result
1979	—	First Round	Louisiana Tech	L 61–100
1980	—	First Round; Second Round	Cheyney State; Louisiana Tech	W 75–66; L 73–81
1981	—	Second Round	UCLA	L 71–73

=== Women's NIT ===
The Jayhawks have appeared in six NIT tournaments. Their combined record is 15–5. They won the 2023 tournament.

Year	Round	Rival	Score
2006	First round Second round	Northern Iowa; Ole Miss	W 59–49; L 76–78
2008	Second round Third round	Evansville; Michigan State	W 82–60; L 54–58
2009	Second round Third round Quarterfinals; Semifinals; Championship	Creighton; Arkansas; New Mexico; Illinois State; South Florida	W 79–64; W 75–59; W 78–69; W 75–72; L 71–75
2010	First round Second round Regional Semifinals	Prairie View A&M; Creighton; Illinois State	W 82–72; W 71–68; L 51–71
2011	First round Second round	Wichita State; Duquesne	W 79–58; L 63–80
2023	First round Second round Super 16; Great 8 Fab 4 Championship	Western Kentucky; Missouri; Nebraska; Arkansas; Washington; Columbia	W 86–72; W 75–47; W 64–55; W 78–64; W 61–36; W 66–59

== Year by year results ==
Season	Team	Overall	Conference	Standing	Postseason	Coaches' poll	AP poll
Marlene Mawson (CIAW) (1968–1971)
1968–69	Marlene Mawson	5–4	–				
1969–70	Marlene Mawson	7–4	–				
1970–71	Marlene Mawson	7–8	–		CIAW Tenth Place		
Marlene Mawson:		19–16	–				
Debbie Artman (Independent) (1971–1972)
1971–72	Debbie Artman	9–8	–				
Debbie Artman:		9–8	–				
Sharon Drysdale (Independent) (1972–1973)
1972–73	Sharon Drysdale	9–8	–				
Sharon Drysdale:		9–8	–				
Marion Washington (Independent, Big 8, Big 12) (1973–2004)
1973–74	Marion Washington	11–8	–				
1974–75	Marion Washington	7–17	–				
1975–76	Marion Washington	13–14	–				
1976–77	Marion Washington	11–15	–				
1977–78	Marion Washington	22–11	–		NWIT Sixth Place		
1978–79	Marion Washington	30–8	–		AIAW Sectional		14
1979–80	Marion Washington	29–8	–		AIAW Sectional		11
1980–81	Marion Washington	27–5	–		AIAW Sectional		10
1981–82	Marion Washington	16–14	–				
Big Eight Conference
1982–83	Marion Washington	13–15	9–5	(Big 8) 3rd			
1983–84	Marion Washington	11–16	7–7	5th			
1984–85	Marion Washington	19–10	9–5	3rd			
1985–86	Marion Washington	18–10	9–5	T–2nd			
1986–87	Marion Washington	20–13	9–5	T–1st#	NCAA Second Round (Play-in)		
1987–88	Marion Washington	22–10	8–6	T–3rd	NCAA Second Round (Play-in)		
1988–89	Marion Washington	13–14	5–9	T–6th			
1989–90	Marion Washington	20–9	9–5	T–4th			
1990–91	Marion Washington	20–13	7–7	5th	NWIT Third Place		
1991–92	Marion Washington	25–6	12–2	1st	NCAA First Round	25	17
1992–93	Marion Washington	21–9	9–5	T–3rd	NCAA First Round		24
1993–94	Marion Washington	22–6	11–3	2nd	NCAA Second Round	17	15
1994–95	Marion Washington	20–11	8–6	3rd	NCAA First Round	23	23
1995–96	Marion Washington	22–10	11–3	1st	NCAA Sweet Sixteen	15	20
Big 12 Conference
1996–97	Marion Washington	25–6	14–2	1st (Big 12)	NCAA Second Round	16	11
1997–98	Marion Washington	23–9	11–5	T–3rd	NCAA Sweet Sixteen	22	
1998–99	Marion Washington	23–10	11–5	3rd	NCAA Second Round		
1999–2000	Marion Washington	20–10	11–5	4th	NCAA First Round		
2000–01	Marion Washington	12–17	5–11	9th			
2001–02	Marion Washington	5–25	0–16	12th			
2002–03	Marion Washington	11–18	3–13	T–9th			
2003–04	Marion Washington	9–18	2–12	T–11th			
Marion Washington:		560–365	180–142				
Lynette Woodward (Big 12) (2004)
2004	Lynette Woodward	0–3	0–2				
Lynette Woodward:		0–3	0–2				
Bonnie Henrickson (Big 12) (2004–2015)
2004–05	Bonnie Henrickson	12–16	5–11	8th			
2005–06	Bonnie Henrickson	17–13	5–11	10th	WNIT First Round (Play-in)		
2006–07	Bonnie Henrickson	11–20	4–11	T–11th			
2007–08	Bonnie Henrickson	17–16	4–12	T–10th	WNIT Second Round (bye)		
2008–09	Bonnie Henrickson	22–14	6–10	T–7th	WNIT Finals		
2009–10	Bonnie Henrickson	17–16	5–11	T–8th	WNIT Third Round		
2010–11	Bonnie Henrickson	21–13	6–10	T–8th	WNIT Second Round		
2011–12	Bonnie Henrickson	21–13	8–10	T–6th	NCAA Sweet Sixteen	25	
2012–13	Bonnie Henrickson	20–14	8–10	7th	NCAA Sweet Sixteen		
2013–14	Bonnie Henrickson	13–19	5–13	T–8th			
2014–15	Bonnie Henrickson	15–17	6–12	9th			
Bonnie Henrickson:		186–171	62–121				
Brandon Schneider (Big 12) (2015–present)
2015–16	Brandon Schneider	6–25	0–18	10th			
2016–17	Brandon Schneider	8–22	2–16	10th			
2017–18	Brandon Schneider	12–18	3–15	9th			
2018–19	Brandon Schneider	13–18	2–16	10th			
2019–20	Brandon Schneider	15–14	4–14	10th			
2020–21	Brandon Schneider	7–18	3–15	T-9th			
2021–22	Brandon Schneider	21–10	11–7	5th	NCAA Second Round		
2022–23	Brandon Schneider	25–11	9–9	7th	WNIT Champions		
2023–24	Brandon Schneider	20–13	11–7	7th	NCAA Second Round	RV	RV
Brandon Schneider:		127–149	45–117				
Total:		910–718					
National champion Postseason invitational champion Conference regular season champion Conference regular season and conference tournament champion Division regular season champion Division regular season and conference tournament champion Conference tournament champion
