= Quacy Timmons =

American basketball player (born 1976)

Personal information
- Born: September 26, 1976 (age 50) Benton Harbor, Michigan
- Listed height: 6 ft 5 in (1.96 m)
- Listed weight: 185 lb (84 kg)

Career information
- High school: Benton Harbor (Benton Harbor, Michigan)
- College: Indiana (1994–1998)
- WNBA draft: 1998: 3rd round, 22nd overall pick
- Drafted by: Sacramento Monarchs
- Playing career: 1998–2002
- Position: Center
- Number: 0, 42
- Coaching career: 2003–present

Career history

Playing
- 1998: Sacramento Monarchs
- 2000–2001: Seattle Storm
- 2002: Phoenix Mercury

Coaching
- 2003–2005: Indiana (assistant)
- 2005–2006: Austin Peay (assistant)
- 2006–20??: Eastern Illinois (assistant)
- 2015–present: Tuskegee

Career highlights
- First-team All-Big Ten (1998)
- Stats at Basketball Reference

Quacy (Barnes) Timmons (born September 26, 1976) was a professional basketball player in the WNBA, as well as leagues in other countries, such as in China, Israel, Italy, South Korea, and Turkey. After playing professionally she began her coaching career.

== Indiana ==
Timmons played for Indiana between 1994 and 1998. In her senior year, she was the team leader in points and rebounds, averaging 18.1 points and 6.5 rebounds. She was named to the all Big Ten first-team in 1997–98. In her final regular-season game against Michigan State she scored 29 points, tying her career high for points scored and breaking the school record for field-goal percentage hitting 12 of her 13 attempts for 92%. In 1996–97, Barnes recorded double digit scoring in 37 consecutive games.

== Professional career ==
Barnes was the second pick in the third round (22nd overall) and of the 1998 WNBA draft, selected by the Sacramento Monarchs. She was the first player in the history of Indiana basketball to be chosen in a WNBA draft.

== Personal life ==
Timmons graduated from Indiana University Bloomington with a bachelor's degree in physical education. Quacy got married and changed her last name to Timmons. She has one son and 2 daughters.

== Career statistics ==
Legend
GP	Games played	GS	Games started	MPG	Minutes per game	RPG	Rebounds per game
APG	Assists per game	SPG	Steals per game	BPG	Blocks per game	PPG	Points per game
TO	Turnovers per game	FG%	Field-goal percentage	3P%	3-point field-goal percentage	FT%	Free-throw percentage
**Bold**	Career best	°	League leader

=== College ===
Year	Team	GP	Points	FG%	3P%	FT%	RPG	APG	PPG
1994–95	Indiana	26	130	.495	.000	.625	3.8	0.2	5.0
1995–96	Indiana	27	314	.439	.000	.662	5.7	**1.7**	11.6
1996–97	Indiana	29	401	.542	.000	.664	6.0	0.8	13.8
1997–98	Indiana	**33**	**583**	**.579**	.000	**.682**	**6.5**	1.2	**17.7**
TOTAL		115	1,428	.526	.000	.670	5.6	1.0	12.4

=== WNBA ===
Year	Team	GP	GS	MPG	FG%	3P%	FT%	RPG	APG	SPG	BPG	TO	PPG
1998	Sacramento	17	0	5.3	.400	.000	.364	0.5	0.1	0.1	0.4	0.5	0.9
2000	Seattle	**31**	**23**	**22.7**	**.418**	.111	.536	**2.7**	**1.1**	**0.6**	**1.1**	2.0	**6.7**
2001	Seattle	20	3	11.5	.390	**1.000**	.778	1.7	0.6	0.5	0.3	0.8	3.4
2002	Phoenix	2	0	6.5	.000	.000	**.750**	0.5	0.0	0.5	1.0	**0.0**	1.5
Career	4 years, 3 teams	70	26	14.8	.401	.200	.592	1.8	0.7	0.4	0.7	1.2	4.2
