= Sonja Henning =

American basketball player and attorney (born 1969)

Personal information
- Born: October 4, 1969 (age 57)
- Listed height: 5 ft 7 in (1.70 m)
- Listed weight: 143 lb (65 kg)

Career information
- High school: Horlick (Racine, Wisconsin)
- College: Stanford (1988–1991)
- WNBA draft: 1999: 2nd round, 12th overall pick
- Drafted by: Houston Comets
- Number: 3

Career history
- 1999: Houston Comets
- 2000–2002: Seattle Storm
- 2002: Houston Comets
- 2003: Washington Mystics
- 2003: Indiana Fever

Career highlights
- WNBA champion (1999); 3× All Pac-10 (1989–1991); Kodak Coaches' All-American (1991); Pac-10 Player of the Year (1991); NCAA champion (1990); Wisconsin Miss Basketball (1987)
- Stats at Basketball Reference
Medals
Women's basketball
Representing the United States
Pan American Games
Bronze medal – third place	1991 Havana	Team competition
FIBA World Championship
Gold medal – first place	1990 Malaysia	Team competition
FIBA Under-18 Americas Championship
Gold medal – first place	1988 Brazil	Team

Sonja L. Henning (born October 4, 1969) is an American attorney and former collegiate and professional women's basketball player. Born in Jackson, Tennessee, she grew up in Racine, Wisconsin, where she attended Horlick High School.

While at Horlick, Henning earned 12 varsity letters in tennis, track and field, and most notably basketball as a 4-year starter at guard. Henning lead the Racine Horlick Rebels to 2 WIAA basketball tournament appearances, including the championship game in 1987 (her senior year). At the end of Henning's prep basketball career in 1987, Sonja became the state of Wisconsin's all-time leading scorer with 2,236 points, a two-time, first-team, all-state selection, and was chosen to be the 1987 Wisconsin Miss Basketball.

== College career ==
Henning attended Stanford University and played for its women's basketball team from 1987 to 1991. She helped the Cardinal win the 1990 NCAA Women's Division I Basketball Championship game, defeating Auburn University Tigers 88–81 with 21 points and nine rebounds. The following year, Henning was named Pac-10 Player of the Year and a Kodak All-American in her senior season.

== Professional career ==
After graduating from Stanford in 1991, there were few opportunities for women to play professional basketball in the United States at the time, so Henning started her professional career playing in a women's professional basketball team in Sweden in 1992.

In 1996, the American Basketball League (ABL) was formed, and Henning tried out for a playing spot on a team in the new league. Henning was eventually drafted by the San Jose Lasers, a team which also featured former Stanford players Jennifer Azzi, Anita Kaplan, and Val Whiting. She played for the Lasers for two seasons, then joined the Portland Power until financial difficulties led to the ABL's demise in 1998.

Henning joined the Women's National Basketball Association (WNBA) after being selected in the second round (24th overall pick) by the Houston Comets during its 1999 WNBA draft and helped the Comets to its third straight WNBA championship season. During that same year, she also served as the president of the WNBA Players Union.

During the 2000 expansion draft on December 15, 1999, Henning was selected by the Seattle Storm. Henning played with the team from 2000 to part of the 2002 season until she was traded back to the Comets.

After the 2002 season ended, she became a free agent, and signed a contract with the Washington Mystics on May 5, 2003, but was waived by the team three weeks later. In June 2003, Henning signed a contract with the Indiana Fever for the remainder of that season then retired thereafter.

== USA Basketball ==
Henning was a member of the USA Women's U18 team which won the gold medal at the FIBA Americas Championship in Sao Paulo, Brazil. The event was known as the Junior World Championship Qualifying Tournament at the time. The event was held in August 1988, when the USA team defeated the host team Brazil by a score of 70–68 to win the championship. Henning sank two free throws with under one second remaining in the game to win the final game and the gold medal.

Henning represented the US at the World Championships held in Kuala Lumpur, Malaysia in July 1990. The team won all eight games, earning the gold medal. Henning scored 2.0 points per game.

Henning again represented the USA at the 1990 Goodwill Games held in Seattle, WA during August 1990; the USA team won the gold medal.

Henning also played with the USA team at the 1991 Pan American Games. The team finished with a record of 4–2, but managed to win the bronze medal. The USA team lost a three-point game to Brazil, then responded with wins over Argentina and Cuba, earning a spot in the medal round. The next game was a rematch against Cuba, and this time the team from Cuba won a five-point game. The USA beat Canada easily to win the bronze. Gordon averaged 3 points per game.

== Career statistics ==
Legend
GP	Games played	GS	Games started	MPG	Minutes per game	RPG	Rebounds per game
APG	Assists per game	SPG	Steals per game	BPG	Blocks per game	PPG	Points per game
TO	Turnovers per game	FG%	Field-goal percentage	3P%	3-point field-goal percentage	FT%	Free-throw percentage
**Bold**	Career best	°	League leader

†	Denotes season in which Henning won a WNBA championship
*	Denotes season in which Henning won an NCAA Championship

=== WNBA ===
==== Regular season ====
WNBA regular season statistics
Year	Team	GP	GS	MPG	FG%	3P%	FT%	RPG	APG	SPG	BPG	TO	PPG
1999^{†}	Houston	**32**	**32**	24.9	**.444**	.317	**.611**	2.5	2.3	1.1	**0.2**	0.9	4.0
2000	Seattle	**32**	**32**	**30.6**	.351	**.379**	.607	**2.7**	2.5	**1.9**	0.1	1.7	**5.3**
2001	Seattle	**32**	28	28.2	.318	.182	.514	2.2	**2.9**	1.6	**0.2**	1.3	3.4
2002	Seattle	8	5	25.9	.364	.000	.500	3.3	1.9	1.1	0.1	0.9	2.3
2002	Houston	23	10	22.7	.346	.250	.455	2.5	2.2	1.0	0.3	1.6	1.9
2003	Washington	1	0	5.0	.000	.000	.000	0.0	0.0	1.0	0.0	0.0	0.0
2003	Indiana	23	1	12.6	.262	.000	.250	1.1	1.3	0.6	0.0	0.6	1.0
**Career**	5 years, 4 teams	151	108	24.5	.356	.278	.547	2.3	2.3	1.3	0.2	1.2	3.2

==== Playoffs ====
WNBA playoff statistics
Year	Team	GP	GS	MPG	FG%	3P%	FT%	RPG	APG	SPG	BPG	TO	PPG
1999^{†}	Houston	**6**	**6**	**22.7**	**.348**	**.111**	**.333**	**3.0**	**1.8**	**1.2**	**0.2**	1.2	**3.2**
2002	Houston	3	3	16.0	.000	.000	.000	1.3	1.3	0.3	0.0	**0.7**	0.0
**Career**	2 years, 1 team	9	9	20.4	.250	.091	.333	2.4	1.7	0.9	0.1	1.0	2.1

=== College ===
College statistics
Year	Team	GP	GS	MPG	FG%	3P%	FT%	RPG	APG	SPG	BPG	TO	PPG
1987–88	Stanford	32	-	-	44.2	0.0	75.9	4.3	4.0	1.7	0.1	-	10.8
1988–89	Stanford	30	-	-	49.8	43.2	72.9	4.1	5.7	1.9	0.1	-	10.1
1989–90*	Stanford	33	-	-	45.1	25.6	73.8	4.2	6.7	2.3	0.2	-	8.8
1990–91	Stanford	32	-	-	45.5	38.0	63.1	6.0	7.4	2.8	0.3	-	15.7
**Career**		127	-	-	46.0	36.4	70.5	4.6	6.0	2.2	0.2	-	11.4

== Personal life ==
An economics major, Henning graduated from Stanford in 1991 with a Bachelor of Arts degree. Henning enrolled in Duke University Law School in 1992 where she obtained a Juris Doctor in 1995. Shortly after graduating, Henning starting working as an attorney specializing in labor and employment law for the Littler Mendelson law firm in Los Angeles, California.

Henning served as president of the Women's National Basketball Players Association from 2001 to 2003.

After serving two years as general counsel for Lucy.com, a startup Internet company that sells women's sporting apparel, Henning joined the law firm Tonkon Torp LLP, in Portland, Oregon.

Henning is currently vice president of North American League Partnership for Nike.

Henning was a former board member for the Urban League of Portland.

In May 2005, Henning was elected to a seat on the Portland School Board with more than 70 percent of the vote.
