= Charmin Smith =

American basketball player and coach (born 1975)

Current position
- Title: Head coach
- Team: California
- Conference: ACC
- Record: 102–104 (.495)

Biographical details
- Born: May 2, 1975 (age 51); St. Louis, Missouri, U.S.

Playing career
- 1993–1997: Stanford
- 1997–1998: Portland Power
- 1999: Minnesota Lynx
- 2000–2001: Seattle Storm
- 2003: Phoenix Mercury
- 2003: Solna Vikings
- Position: Guard

Coaching career (HC unless noted)
- 2003–2004: Boston College (asst.)
- 2004–2007: Stanford (asst.)
- 2007–2012: California (asst.)
- 2012–2019: California (Assoc. HC)
- 2019: New York Liberty (asst.)
- 2019–present: California

Head coaching record
- Overall: 102–104 (.495)

Charmin Arnette Smith (born May 2, 1975) is an American basketball coach and former player who is the head coach of the California Golden Bears women's team.

== Early life and collegiate career ==
Smith was born in St. Louis on May 2, 1975.

Smith graduated from Ladue Horton Watkins High School in St. Louis in 1993. As a senior at Watkins, she earned Missouri First Team All-State honors. After high school, Smith attended Stanford University, where she played four years for the Cardinal. A four-year letter winner from 1993 to 1997, Smith helped Stanford win three consecutive Pac-10 championships and make three consecutive Final Four appearances in 1995, 1996, and 1997. Smith averaged 4.7 points, 3.4 rebounds, and 2.2 assists during her senior year.

Smith earned two degrees in civil and environmental engineering at the Stanford University School of Engineering, a bachelor's degree in 1997 and master's degree in 2000.

== Professional career ==
After her years at Stanford, Smith played one year with the Portland Power of the ABL, the last year before the league folded.

She would be signed by the Minnesota Lynx for the 1999 WNBA season. In December 1999, the Seattle Storm picked her up in the 2000 expansion draft, and she would play for the Storm for the 2000 and 2001 WNBA seasons. She would play one more season in the WNBA for the Phoenix Mercury in 2003.

Smith went overseas in 2003 to play for the Swedish team Solna Vikings before retiring from the sport as a player.

During her off-seasons with the WNBA, Smith would work as a production assistant and editor with NBA Entertainment, as well as with the Seattle Storm CR office.

== Career statistics ==
Legend
GP	Games played	GS	Games started	MPG	Minutes per game	RPG	Rebounds per game
APG	Assists per game	SPG	Steals per game	BPG	Blocks per game	PPG	Points per game
TO	Turnovers per game	FG%	Field-goal percentage	3P%	3-point field-goal percentage	FT%	Free-throw percentage
**Bold**	Career best	°	League leader

=== WNBA ===
==== Regular season ====
WNBA regular season statistics
Year	Team	GP	GS	MPG	FG%	3P%	FT%	RPG	APG	SPG	BPG	TO	PPG
1999	Minnesota	13	0	4.3	.111	.000	**.800**	0.7	0.2	0.1	0.0	0.4	0.8
2000	Seattle	**32**	3	16.1	**.286**	**.313**	.56	1.5	**1.7**	**0.5**	**0.1**	1.0	1.6
2001	Seattle	32	**8**	**18.4**	.270	.289	.619	**1.7**	1.2	**0.5**	0.0	0.8	**1.8**
2002	Did not play (waived)												
2003	Phoenix	4	0	4.3	.000	.000	—	1.0	0.3	0.0	0.0	0.0	0.0
**Career**	4 years, 3 teams	81	11	14.5	.262	.276	.633	1.4	1.2	0.4	0.0	0.8	1.5

=== College ===
College statistics
Year	Team	GP	GS	MPG	FG%	3P%	FT%	RPG	APG	SPG	BPG	TO	PPG
1993–94	Stanford	24	-	-	**43.5**	**36.4**	**75.0**	1.1	0.4	0.2	0.2	-	1.5
1994–95	Stanford	31	-	-	35.4	33.3	66.7	1.7	1.7	0.6	0.1	-	1.7
1995–96	Stanford	32	-	-	29.2	25.9	65.0	**3.5**	1.9	0.7	**0.3**	-	2.8
1996–97	Stanford	**36**	-	-	35.6	33.8	69.2	3.4	**2.2**	**0.8**	0.1	-	**4.7**
**Career**		123	-	-	34.0	31.3	68.8	2.5	1.6	0.6	0.2	-	2.8

== Coaching career ==
=== Boston College ===
Smith began her coaching career as an assistant under Cathy Inglese at Boston College in the 2003−04 season. The Eagles won their first Big East tournament championship, and were eliminated in the regional semifinals of the 2004 NCAA tournament.

=== Stanford ===
Smith was subsequently hired by Tara VanDerveer, under whom she played at Stanford, as an assistant for the Cardinal. In Smith's three years on VanDerveer's staff, the Cardinal went 87−16 overall, attaining a record of 49−5 in Pac-10 play, while winning two conference tournaments and making the Elite 8 twice.

=== California ===
Smith joined Joanne Boyle's coaching staff at California in 2007. The Golden Bears won the 2010 WNIT and made postseason appearances in all of Boyle's remaining years as coach.

Smith remained on the California staff when Lindsay Gottlieb was named head coach in 2011. For the 2012−13 season, Gottlieb promoted Smith to associate head coach, helping to lead a team with high expectations coming off a second round NCAA tournament appearance in 2011−12. That year, California went 32–4 (17–1 in the Pac-10) and made their first ever Final Four appearance.

=== New York Liberty ===
On April 2, 2019, Smith joined Katie Smith's staff with the New York Liberty as an assistant coach. She served in that capacity for roughly two and a half months.

=== Return to California as head coach ===
Following Lindsay Gottlieb's departure for the Cleveland Cavaliers nine days earlier, Smith returned to California on June 21, 2019, being announced as the 10th head coach in California Golden Bears history. She departed New York with Katie Smith's blessing.

== Head coaching record ==
Record table
Season	Team	Overall	Conference	Standing	Postseason
California Golden Bears (Pac-12 Conference) (2019–2024)
2019–20	California	12–19	3–15	12th	
2020–21	California	1–16	1–12	12th	
2021–22	California	11–13	2–10	11th	
2022–23	California	13–17	4–14	T–10th	
2023–24	California	19–15	7–11	T–8th	WBIT Second Round
California Golden Bears (Atlantic Coast Conference) (2024–present)
2024–25	California	25–9	12–6	7th	NCAA First Round
2025–26	California	21–15	9–9	10th	WBIT Quarterfinals
California:		102–104 (.495)	38–77 (.330)		
Total:		102–104 (.495)			
National champion Postseason invitational champion Conference regular season champion Conference regular season and conference tournament champion Division regular season champion Division regular season and conference tournament champion Conference tournament champion
