= Stacey Lovelace-Tolbert =

American basketball player (born 1974)

Stacey Lovelace
Personal information
- Born: December 5, 1974 (age 51)
- Listed height: 6 ft 4 in (1.93 m)
- Listed weight: 170 lb (77 kg)

Career information
- High school: St. Martin de Porres (Detroit, Michigan)
- College: Purdue (1992–1996)
- WNBA draft: 2000: assigned round
- Drafted by: Seattle Storm
- Playing career: 2000–present
- Position: Forward

Career history
- 2000–2001: Seattle Storm
- 2004–2005: Minnesota Lynx
- 2006: Chicago Sky
- 2007: Washington Mystics
- 2008: Detroit Shock
- 2008: Atlanta Dream

Career highlights
- Kodak All-American (1995); Big Ten Player of the Year (1995); Chicago Tribune Silver Basketball (1995); 2× First-team All-Big Ten (1995, 1996)
- Stats at Basketball Reference
Medals
Women's basketball
Representing the United States
Jones Cup
| Bronze medal – third place | 1995 Taipei, Taiwan | Team competition |

Stacey Lovelace (born December 5, 1974) is an American professional basketball player who played in the WNBA.

Lovelace attended college at Purdue University and graduated in 1996. On May 2, 2000, she was assigned with the Indiana Fever later in 2000 Lovelace played with the Seattle Storm. She also had stints with the Minnesota Lynx, Chicago Sky, and the Washington Mystics.

On March 27, 2008, Lovelace signed with the Atlanta Dream. She was waived on July 8, 2008, and became a free agent. On July 11, Lovelace was signed by the Detroit Shock, however, on August 8 she was waived by the team. Lovelace was an assistant coach of the Tulsa Shock in 2013. She then was an assistant coach of the women's basketball team of the Oakland University from 2014 to 2016. She joined the NBA operations management training program in 2016 and worked as a player development specialist for the NBA G League from 2017 to 2022. In September 2022, she became an assistant general manager for the Motor City Cruise.

== WNBA career statistics ==
Legend
| GP | Games played | GS | Games started | MPG | Minutes per game | RPG | Rebounds per game |
| APG | Assists per game | SPG | Steals per game | BPG | Blocks per game | PPG | Points per game |
| TO | Turnovers per game | FG% | Field-goal percentage | 3P% | 3-point field-goal percentage | FT% | Free-throw percentage |
| **Bold** | Career best | ° | League leader |

=== Regular season ===
| Year | Team | GP | GS | MPG | FG% | 3P% | FT% | RPG | APG | SPG | BPG | TO | PPG |
|---|---|---|---|---|---|---|---|---|---|---|---|---|---|
| 2000 | Seattle | 23 | 1 | 14.1 | .350 | .222 | .806 | 2.5 | 0.7 | 0.6 | 0.1 | 1.5 | 4.3 |
| 2001 | Seattle | 22 | 2 | 9.6 | .380 | .385 | .706 | 1.5 | 0.4 | 0.4 | 0.2 | 0.8 | 3.5 |
| 2004 | Minnesota | **34** | 0 | 11.4 | .402 | .176 | **.833** | 1.9 | 0.6 | 0.5 | 0.3 | 1.3 | 3.6 |
| 2005 | Minnesota | **34** | 2 | 17.5 | .405 | .413 | .796 | 3.1 | 0.9 | 0.7 | 0.3 | 1.1 | 6.1 |
| 2006 | Chicago | **34** | 6 | **18.5** | .415 | .302 | .786 | **4.0** | 0.6 | 0.6 | 0.6 | 1.6 | **7.4** |
| 2007 | Washington | 9 | 0 | 11.7 | **.429** | .286 | .500 | 1.4 | 0.2 | 0.4 | 0.0 | 0.8 | 2.7 |
| 2008 | Atlanta | 15 | **7** | 17.2 | .404 | **.417** | .692 | 3.6 | **1.0** | **1.1** | **0.7** | 1.2 | 6.1 |
| 2008 | Detroit | 7 | 2 | 6.3 | .286 | .400 | .667 | 1.0 | 0.1 | 0.1 | 0.0 | 0.6 | 1.4 |
| Career | 7 years, 6 teams | 178 | 20 | 14.3 | .398 | .346 | .770 | 2.7 | 0.7 | 0.6 | 0.3 | 1.2 | 5.0 |

=== Playoffs ===
| Year | Team | GP | GS | MPG | FG% | 3P% | FT% | RPG | APG | SPG | BPG | TO | PPG |
|---|---|---|---|---|---|---|---|---|---|---|---|---|---|
| 2004 | Minnesota | 2 | 0 | 8.5 | .500 | .000 | .500 | 1.5 | 0.5 | 0.0 | 0.5 | 0.5 | 3.0 |
| Career | 1 year, 1 team | 2 | 0 | 8.5 | .500 | .000 | .500 | 1.5 | 0.5 | 0.0 | 0.5 | 0.5 | 3.0 |

== Purdue statistics ==
Legend
| GP | Games played | GS | Games started | MPG | Minutes per game |
| FG% | Field goal percentage | 3P% | 3-point field goal percentage | FT% | Free throw percentage |
| RPG | Rebounds per game | APG | Assists per game | SPG | Steals per game |
| BPG | Blocks per game | PPG | Points per game | **Bold** | Career high |

| Year | Team | GP | Points | FG% | 3P% | FT% | RPG | APG | SPG | BPG | PPG |
|---|---|---|---|---|---|---|---|---|---|---|---|
| 1992-93 | Purdue | 24 | 221 | 48.7% | 0.0% | 60.0% | 4.2 | 0.5 | 1.1 | 1.5 | 9.2 |
| 1993-94 | Purdue | **34** | 388 | **52.6%** | 0.0% | 68.7% | 7.4 | 1.1 | 1.8 | 1.7 | 11.4 |
| 1994-95 | Purdue | 32 | 453 | 47.6% | **10.0%** | 67.2% | 8.1 | 1.3 | **2.3** | **2.5** | 14.2 |
| 1995-96 | Purdue | 30 | **465** | 50.8% | 0.0% | **69.7%** | **8.8** | **1.6** | 1.6 | 1.5 | **15.5** |
| Career | Purdue | 120 | 1527 | 50.0% | 6.7% | 67.2% | 7.3 | 1.2 | 1.7 | 1.8 | 12.7 |

== USA Basketball ==
Lovelace-Tolbert competed with USA Basketball as a member of the 1995 Jones Cup Team that won the Bronze in Taipei. Lovelace-Tolbert led the team in scoring, averaging 14.9 points per game.
