= Angela Aycock =

American basketball player (born 1973)

Personal information
- Born: February 28, 1973 (age 53) Dallas, Texas, U.S.
- Listed height: 6 ft 2 in (1.88 m)
- Listed weight: 161 lb (73 kg)

Career information
- High school: Lincoln (Dallas, Texas)
- College: Kansas (1991–1995)
- Playing career: 1995–2002
- Position: Guard

Career history
- 1995–1996: SC Alcamo
- 1996–1998: Seattle Reign
- 1999: Panathinaikos AC
- 1999: Phoenix Mercury
- 2000: Seattle Storm
- 2000: Minnesota Lynx

Career highlights
- Second-team All-American – AP (1995); WBCA Coaches' All-American (1995); All-American – USBWA (1995)

Career WNBA statistics
- Points: 8 (1.1 ppg)
- Assists: 7 (1.0 apg)
- Stats at Basketball Reference
Medals
Representing the United States
FIBA Under-18 Americas Championship
Silver medal – second place	1992 Mexico	Team

Angela Lynette Aycock (born February 28, 1973), later known as Sister Paula, is an American former professional basketball player. She played for two seasons in the Women's National Basketball Association (WNBA) before retiring to a monastic life in 2002.

== College career ==
Aycock was recruited in 1991 from Lincoln High School in Dallas, Texas to play college basketball for the University of Kansas (Kansas Jayhawks). At the time she was touted as the second-best player in the country by the Women's Basketball News Service, and was the USA Today and Dallas Morning News Texas Player of the Year.

In her sophomore year, she was named team captain. As a junior, she was the Big Eight Conference co-player of the year. In her senior year, she made several All-America teams. By the end of her college career she had scored 1,978 points for Jayhawks, the third highest total in the team's history.

== Professional career ==
Early in her professional career, Aycock played two full seasons and part of a third for the Seattle Reign in the now-defunct American Basketball League.

She also traveled overseas to compete in Italy, Greece, Spain, France and South Korea.

In her short stint with the WNBA, she saw game time with the Phoenix Mercury, the Minnesota Lynx and the Seattle Storm. During the 2000 expansion draft on December 15, 1999, Aycock was selected by the Storm.

Overall, she featured in 98 games for the ABL, and in 12 for the WNBA.

== USA basketball ==
She also turned out for the USA Women's U18 and U19 teams, in 1992 and 1993. Her U18 team won the silver medal at the COPABA Junior World Championship Qualifying Tournament in Guanajuato, Mexico.

== Career statistics ==
Legend
GP	Games played	GS	Games started	MPG	Minutes per game	RPG	Rebounds per game
APG	Assists per game	SPG	Steals per game	BPG	Blocks per game	PPG	Points per game
TO	Turnovers per game	FG%	Field-goal percentage	3P%	3-point field-goal percentage	FT%	Free-throw percentage
**Bold**	Career best	°	League leader

=== WNBA ===
WNBA regular season statistics
Year	Team	GP	GS	MPG	FG%	3P%	FT%	RPG	APG	SPG	BPG	TO	PPG
1999	Phoenix	**8**	0	3.8	.000	.000	**1.000**	0.1	0.4	**0.3**	0.0	0.8	**0.5**
2000	Seattle	1	0	**7.0**	.000	.000	.000	**2.0**	0.0	0.0	0.0	0.0	0.0
2000	Minnesota	3	0	2.0	.000	.000	.000	1.0	**1.3**	0.0	0.0	0.0	0.0
**Career**	2 years, 3 teams	12	0	3.6	.000	.000	1.000	0.5	0.6	0.2	0.0	0.5	0.3

=== College ===
College statistics
Year	Team	GP	Points	FG%	3P%	FT%	RPG	APG	SPG	BPG	PPG
1991–92	Kansas	29	300	**47.5%**	0.0%	63.3%	5.2	1.3	1.8	**0.9**	10.3
1992–93	Kansas	30	489	47.1%	25.0%	67.8%	6.9	2.0	2.8	0.5	16.3
1993–94	Kansas	28	473	44.6%	14.3%	69.8%	**8.7**	3.2	2.8	0.5	16.9
1994–95	Kansas	**31**	**716**	41.3%	**32.8%**	**74.4%**	7.3	**3.4**	**3.0**	0.4	**23.1**
**Career**		118	1978	44.5%	31.0%	70.7%	7.0	2.5	2.6	0.6	16.8

== Personal life ==
In 2002, Aycock moved on from professional basketball to become a nun of the Russian Orthodox Church Outside Russia after converting to it, coming from a Baptist background. According to her sister, she was apparently introduced to the church during her time visiting various churches and cathedrals in Europe. She took the name Sister Paula, and was subsequently cloistered at the Protection of the Holy Virgin Mary Convent in Bluffton, Canada. In mid-2003 she transferred to another convent, the location of which is not known.

== Other honors ==
In February 2003, Aycock made the journey from her Bluffton convent to the KU campus in Lawrence, Kansas, to see her jersey (No. 12) retired. It remains the last time she has made a public appearance.
