= Charisse Sampson =

American basketball player (born 1974)

Personal information
- Born: September 1, 1974 (age 52) Los Angeles, California, U.S.
- Listed height: 5 ft 10 in (1.78 m)
- Listed weight: 175 lb (79 kg)

Career information
- High school: Washington Prep (Westmont, California)
- College: Kansas (1992–1996)
- WNBA draft: 2000: 2nd round, 25th overall pick
- Drafted by: Seattle Storm
- Position: Guard

Career history
- 1996–1997: New England Blizzard
- 1998–2000: Oviedo
- 2000: Seattle Storm
- Stats at Basketball Reference

Charisse Marie Sampson (born September 1, 1974) is an American former professional basketball player for the Seattle Storm.

== Career statistics ==
Legend
GP	Games played	GS	Games started	MPG	Minutes per game	RPG	Rebounds per game
APG	Assists per game	SPG	Steals per game	BPG	Blocks per game	PPG	Points per game
TO	Turnovers per game	FG%	Field-goal percentage	3P%	3-point field-goal percentage	FT%	Free-throw percentage
**Bold**	Career best	°	League leader

=== WNBA ===
==== Regular season ====
Year	Team	GP	GS	MPG	FG%	3P%	FT%	RPG	APG	SPG	BPG	TO	PPG
2000	Seattle	21	6	13.3	46.8	39.1	89.3	2.0	0.5	0.9	0.3	0.7	3.7
Career	1 year, 1 team	21	6	13.3	46.8	39.1	89.3	2.0	0.5	0.9	0.3	0.7	3.7

=== College ===
Year	Team	GP	GS	MPG	FG%	3P%	FT%	RPG	APG	SPG	BPG	TO	PPG
1992–93	Kansas	30	-	-	43.7	38.7	71.3	5.0	1.4	2.4	0.4	-	11.6
1993–94	Kansas	28	-	-	47.7	33.3	73.5	6.6	**2.4**	**3.4**	0.3	-	13.3
1994–95	Kansas	**31**	-	-	**49.7**	37.2	**76.5**	**6.9**	2.2	2.6	**0.5**	-	**15.8**
1995–96	Kansas	28	-	-	48.1	**41.2**	66.3	6.6	1.9	2.0	**0.5**	-	12.8
**Career**		117	-	-	47.5	37.7	72.6	6.3	2.0	2.6	0.4	-	13.4
Statistics retrieved from Sports-Reference.
