= Nina Bjedov =

Serbian basketball player (born 1972)

Personal information
- Born: 18 May 1972 (age 54) Belgrade, SFR Yugoslavia
- Listed height: 1.98 m (6 ft 6 in)

Career information
- Playing career: –2005
- Position: Power forward

Career history
- 1994–1996: Crvena zvezda
- 1996–1997: Profi D Pančevo
- 1997–1998: Hemofarm
- 1998–1999: Basket Bees Treviglio
- 1999: Los Angeles Sparks
- 2000–2004: C. Atletico Faenza
- 2004–2005: CJM Bourges Basket
- Stats at Basketball Reference
Medals
Women's basketball
Representing Yugoslavia
FIBA World Championship
Silver medal – second place	1990 Kuala Lumpur	Team competition

Nina Bjedov (Serbian Cyrillic: Нина Бједов, born 18 May 1972) is a former Serbian female basketball player.

== Professional career ==
During the 2000 expansion draft on 15 December 1999, Bjedov was selected by the Seattle Storm. However, Bjedov would never play for the Storm.

== See also ==
- List of Serbian WNBA players
