= Kamila Vodičková =

Czech basketball player (born 1972)

Kamila Vodičková (born December 19, 1972, in Litoměřice, Czechoslovakia) is a Czech women's basketball player. She played for the North American WNBA's Seattle Storm and Phoenix Mercury. She represented Czechoslovakia at the 1992 Summer Olympics.

== WNBA career ==
The Storm made her the first draft choice of the franchise, a move that caused Vodičková some initial concern. However, after being quickly embraced by the Seattle fans, the redubbed "Vodka" became the centerpiece of the offense, with Edna Campbell as the outside threat. The team did not improve from its initial poor showings until Vodičková got a running mate inside, Australian Lauren Jackson.

In the 2004 season, Vodičková was faced with a tough choice, as her home country's Olympic team demanded that she skip the WNBA season if she wanted to play in the 2004 Summer Olympics. Vodičková refused to go home, and the decision proved prescient, as the Storm ran to a championship that year.

The salary-capped Storm lost three of its marquee players after the championship, with Vodičková going to the Phoenix Mercury. Despite strong play from Vodičková, Penny Taylor, Anna DeForge, Maria Stepanova, and Diana Taurasi, the Mercury missed the playoffs in 2005.

After the Mercury missed the playoffs again in 2006, Vodičková announced she was expecting a child and would be on maternity leave during the entire 2007 WNBA season. She has not returned to the WNBA since.

== International career ==
Vodičková has been known to be a dominant player in the Czech circuit. In 2005, she played for the Dynamo in the Russian super league.

== Vital statistics ==
- Position: Forward/Center
- Height: 6 ft. 4 in. / 1.93 m
- College: Czech Republic
- Team(s):Phoenix Mercury, Seattle Storm (WNBA); Dynamo (EuroLeague)
