= Andrea Garner =

American basketball player (born 1979)

Personal information
- Born: January 5, 1979 (age 47)
- Listed height: 6 ft 3 in (1.91 m)
- Listed weight: 160 lb (73 kg)

Career information
- College: Penn State (1996–2000)
- WNBA draft: 2000: 2nd round, 32nd overall pick
- Drafted by: Houston Comets
- Position: Forward-Center
- Number: 30

Career history
- 2000: Seattle Storm

Career highlights
- Big Ten Tournament MOP (1998)
- Stats at Basketball Reference

Andrea Garner (born January 5, 1979) is a former professional basketball player. The 6 ft 3in tall Garner won the NCAA Top VIII award in 2000.

== Awards and honors ==
=== College ===
- Third-team GTE Academic All-American
- 3x Academic All-Big Ten honoree
- NCAA Top VIII award (2000)

== Penn State statistics ==
Legend
GP	Games played	GS	Games started	MPG	Minutes per game
FG%	Field goal percentage	3P%	3-point field goal percentage	FT%	Free throw percentage
RPG	Rebounds per game	APG	Assists per game	SPG	Steals per game
BPG	Blocks per game	PPG	Points per game	**Bold**	Career high

Year	Team	GP	Points	FG%	3P%	FT%	RPG	APG	SPG	BPG	PPG
1996-97	Penn State	27	197	42.5%	0.0%	62.3%	6.1	0.8	0.7	0.9	7.3
1997-98	Penn State	34	473	**50.3%**	-	58.9%	**8.6**	0.8	0.6	1.0	13.9
1998-99	Penn State	30	433	50.0%	0.0%	65.9%	8.5	1.4	**1.5**	**1.7**	14.4
1999-00	Penn State	**35**	**516**	47.7%	**66.7%**	**72.9%**	8.6	**1.8**	1.3	2.2	**14.7**
Career		136	1619	48.4%	28.6%	65.4%	7.5	1.1	1.1	1.4	11.9

== Personal life ==
Andrea Garner, born 5 January 1979, is a former basketball player. She earned a degree in marketing from Penn State. The 6 ft 3in tall Garner won the NCAA Top VIII award in 2000.
