= Simone Edwards =

Jamaican basketball player (1973–2023)

Simone Edwards OD
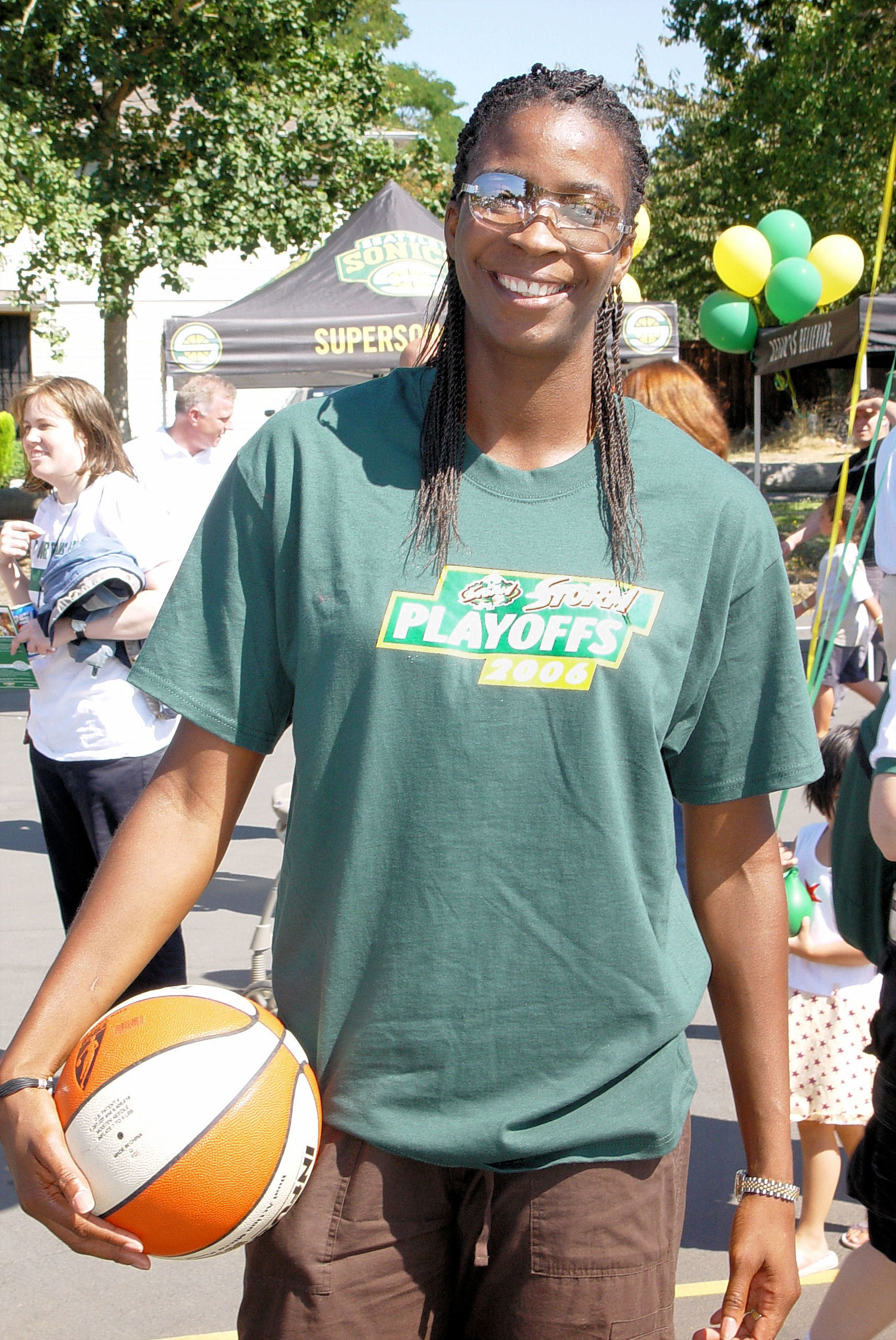
- Edwards in 2006

Personal information
- Born: November 17, 1973 Kingston, Jamaica
- Died: February 16, 2023 (aged 49) Florida, U.S.
- Listed height: 6 ft 4 in (1.93 m)
- Listed weight: 164 lb (74 kg)

Career information
- College: Iowa
- Stats at Basketball Reference

Simone Ann-Marie Edwards (November 17, 1973 – February 16, 2023) was a Jamaican basketball player who played for the New York Liberty and the Seattle Storm and was the first Jamaican player in the Women's National Basketball Association (WNBA). The 6'4" center was known to fans as the "Jamaican Hurricane."

== Career ==
Edwards did not play basketball in high school. She was spotted by an American college basketball coach after competing in a track meet in Jamaica, where she was undefeated as a sprinter throughout high school. She first garnered attention on the court during junior college, at Seminole State College in Seminole, Oklahoma, leading the team to an undefeated conference record, ranking in the National Junior College Athletic Association Top 10. During her tenure, she became the First Kodak All-American in the school’s history. In 1996–97, she led the University of Iowa Hawkeyes in field-goal percentage (.557) during her senior season.

Edwards was one of three players picked out of over 300 athletes at a New York Liberty tryout camp. She was chosen as a developmental player by the Liberty in 1997, but never saw a game until signing on with the newly inaugurated Seattle Storm in 2000. She was the only player to be a part of the team for every game of its first six seasons. Edwards won a WNBA championship with the Storm in 2004.

On May 19, 2006, just prior to the start of the 2006 WNBA season, Edwards announced her retirement from the WNBA. She retired as the team's all-time leader in rebounds, minutes, and games played.

From 1997 to 2007, Edwards played professional basketball in Europe and Israel. Edwards coached the Jamaican women's national basketball team and led them to a 2014 Caribbean Championship. On August 5, 2007, she was hired as an assistant coach at Radford University. Edwards was an assistant at George Mason University from 2008 to 2011.

== Personal life and death ==
Edwards was named the National Spokesperson for Caribbean American Heritage Month for June 2017. On June 9, 2017, she released Unstoppable: A Memoir of Adversity, Perseverance & Triumph. On August 6, 2017, the Government of Jamaica appointed Edwards an Officer of the Order of Distinction (OD), which is bestowed on citizens of Jamaica who have rendered outstanding and important service to Jamaica in their field.

Edwards died from ovarian cancer on February 16, 2023, at the age of 49.
