= Edna Campbell =

American basketball player (born 1968)

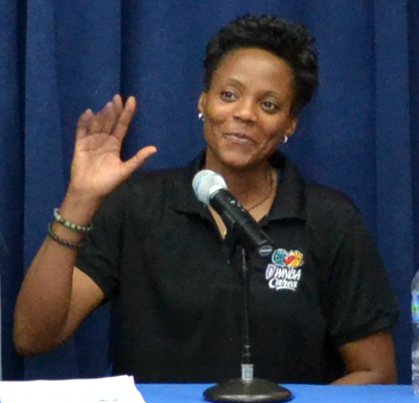
- Campbell in 2012

Personal information
- Born: November 26, 1968 (age 57) Philadelphia, Pennsylvania, U.S.
- Listed height: 5 ft 8 in (1.73 m)
- Listed weight: 152 lb (69 kg)

Career information
- College: Texas
- WNBA draft: 1999: 1st round, 10th overall pick
- Drafted by: Phoenix Mercury
- Playing career: 1987–2005
- Position: Guard

Career history
- 1996–1998: Colorado Xplosion
- 1999: Phoenix Mercury
- 2000: Seattle Storm
- 2001–2004: Sacramento Monarchs
- 2005: San Antonio Silver Stars
- Stats at WNBA.com
- Stats at Basketball Reference
Medals
Women's basketball
Representing the United States
Jones Cup
Gold medal – first place	1987 Taipei	Team competition
Silver medal – second place	1988 Taipei	Team competition
FIBA World Championship for Women
Gold medal – first place	1998 Berlin	Team competition

Edna Campbell (born November 26, 1968) is a former women's basketball player who played in the Women's National Basketball Association (WNBA). The 5 ft 8 in guard played with the Sacramento Monarchs as well as three other teams, but is well known for continuing to play despite suffering breast cancer. In 2004, she was designated a Women's History Month honoree by the National Women's History Project. Campbell was born in Philadelphia, Pennsylvania.

== College years ==
Campbell's college career began at the University of Maryland, College Park, but achieved her most notable success at the University of Texas' women's team, known as the Lady Longhorns, where she was named the Southwest Conference's Newcomer of the Year in 1990. She graduated in 1991 after the Lady Longhorns compiled a 48-14 won/loss record while she was there.

== USA Basketball ==
Campbell was named to the team representing the US at the 1987 William Jones Cup competition in Taipei, Taiwan. The team won all seven games to win the gold medal for the event. The USA was down at halftime in the opening game against Japan, but came back in the second half to win, helped by 15 points from Campbell. She averaged 9.7 points per game over the seven games, and was named to the all-tournament team.

In the following year, 1988, Campbell was also named to the Jones Cup team. The USA team was not as successful, with a 3–2 record, but that was enough to secure the silver medal. She averaged 5.6 points per game and tied for the team lead with 15 steals. Campbell was selected to represent the US at the 1995 USA Women's Pan American Games, however, only four teams committed to participate, so the event was cancelled.

Campbell was named to the USA national team in 1998. The national team traveled to Berlin, Germany in July and August 1998 for the FIBA World Championships. The USA team won a close opening game against Japan 95–89, then won their next six games easily. In the semifinal game against Brazil, the USA team was behind as much as ten points in the first half, but the USA went on to win 93–79. The gold medal game was a rematch against Russia. In the first game, the USA team dominated almost from the beginning, but in the rematch, the team from Russia took the early lead and led much of the way. With under two minutes remaining, the USA was down by two points but the USA responded, then held on to win the gold medal 71–65. Campbell played limited minutes but had two steals.

== Professional career ==
=== ABL ===
Campbell played for the Colorado Xplosion in the American Basketball League (ABL) 1996–1998.

=== WNBA ===
Campbell was the 10th overall draft pick, selected by the Phoenix Mercury during the 1999 WNBA draft. She was left unprotected in the 2000 expansion draft, and was chosen by the Seattle Storm. She became the new franchise's go-to option, but the team finished their inaugural season with a 6–26 record.

The next year, the Storm drafted its first superstar, Lauren Jackson, and Campbell was traded to the Sacramento Monarchs for Katy Steding and a draft pick. Campbell signed a free agent contract with the San Antonio Silver Stars in 2005. She played with the Silver Stars for that one season, before announcing her retirement from the WNBA on February 28, 2006.

During the 2006 WNBA season, which honored nine years of the league's existence, Campbell's return from breast cancer was nominated by fans as Most Inspirational and one of the top four WNBA Anniversary decade moments.

== Career statistics ==
Legend
GP	Games played	GS	Games started	MPG	Minutes per game	RPG	Rebounds per game
APG	Assists per game	SPG	Steals per game	BPG	Blocks per game	PPG	Points per game
TO	Turnovers per game	FG%	Field-goal percentage	3P%	3-point field-goal percentage	FT%	Free-throw percentage
**Bold**	Career best	°	League leader

=== WNBA ===
==== Regular season ====
Year	Team	GP	GS	MPG	FG%	3P%	FT%	RPG	APG	SPG	BPG	TO	PPG
1999	Phoenix	28	24	26.8	.364	.376	.714	1.9	1.3	0.9	**0.4**	1.7	9.6
2000	Seattle	16	16	**31.9**	.391	.265	.707	2.1	**2.3**	**1.2**	0.3	2.5	**13.9**
2001	Sacramento	32	32	26.7	.377	**.457**	.767	**2.7**	**2.3**	0.6	0.3	2.0	8.1
2002	Sacramento	1	0	12.0	.400	.000	.000	1.0	0.0	1.0	0.0	**0.0**	4.0
2003	Sacramento	**34**	**34**	21.3	**.402**	.414	.758	2.1	1.3	0.6	0.2	1.3	7.9
2004	Sacramento	22	22	15.1	.382	.410	.000	0.9	0.7	0.2	0.1	0.7	3.4
2005	San Antonio	28	2	8.9	.313	.263	**1.000**	0.5	0.5	0.3	0.0	0.5	1.7
Career	7 years, 4 teams	161	130	21.3	.379	.388	.725	1.7	1.4	0.6	0.2	1.4	7.1

==== Playoffs ====
Year	Team	GP	GS	MPG	FG%	3P%	FT%	RPG	APG	SPG	BPG	TO	PPG
2001	Sacramento	5	5	23.0	.355	**.444**	.667	**2.2**	**2.2**	**1.0**	**0.2**	1.0	5.6
2003	Sacramento	**6**	**6**	**24.7**	**.472**	.250	**1.000**	0.7	1.8	0.2	0.0	1.3	**6.7**
2004	Sacramento	**6**	**6**	17.0	.400	.429	.000	1.8	0.8	0.5	0.0	**0.3**	4.3
Career	3 years, 1 team	17	17	21.5	.413	.359	.800	1.5	1.6	0.5	0.1	0.9	5.5

=== College ===
Year	Team	GP	GS	MPG	FG%	3P%	FT%	RPG	APG	SPG	BPG	TO	PPG
1987–88	Maryland	**32**	-	-	47.1	0.0	73.2	**4.8**	**2.9**	**2.0**	0.2	-	9.0
1989–90	Texas	29	-	-	**56.6**	0.0	75.8	3.7	2.0	1.6	**0.4**	-	14.9
1990–91	Texas	26	-	-	55.9	**42.9**	**80.2**	3.8	2.7	**2.0**	0.3	-	**16.7**
**Career**		87	-	-	53.6	42.9	76.8	4.1	2.5	1.9	0.3	-	13.3
Statistics retrieved from Sports-Reference.

== Personal life ==
During the second of her four seasons in Sacramento, Campbell was diagnosed with breast cancer. She received treatment and was welcomed back before the fans of her two most recent teams in the Monarchs' final game against Seattle during the 2002 season.

Campbell continued to play despite her diagnosis, and has become a symbol to survivors of the disease. She became the WNBA's national spokesperson for its anti-cancer efforts with the Susan G. Komen Breast Cancer Foundation. She received the league's Kim Perrot Sportsmanship Award in 2003.

Shortly after retiring from basketball, Edna was hired as a television commentator for the San Antonio Silver Stars games during the 2006 WNBA season. Edna then became a nurse in 2008, and also coached high school girls. In 2017, Edna was inducted into The Multi-Ethnic Sports Hall of Fame.
