= Trisha Stafford-Odom =

American basketball player and coach (born 1970)

Charlotte Crown
- Title: Head coach

Personal information
- Born: November 11, 1970 (age 56) Ladera Heights, California, U.S.
- Listed height: 6 ft 0 in (1.83 m)
- Listed weight: 160 lb (73 kg)

Career information
- High school: Westchester (Los Angeles, California)
- College: California (1988–1992)
- Position: Forward
- Number: 5

Career history

Playing
- 1996–1997: San Jose Lasers
- 1997–1998: Long Beach Stingrays
- 2001: Houston Comets
- 2002: Houston Stealth
- 2002: Miami Sol
- 2003: Tennessee Fury

Coaching
- 2002–2005: Westchester High School
- 2005–2008: UCLA (assistant)
- 2009–2011: Duke (assistant)
- 2011–2013: North Carolina (assistant)
- 2013–2016: Concordia
- 2017–2023: North Carolina Central
- 2025–present: Charlotte Crown

Career highlights
- NWBL champion (2002); 2× First-team All-Pac-10 (1991–1992); GSAC Coach of the Year (2015)
- Stats at Basketball Reference
Medals
Representing USA
William Jones Cup
Bronze medal – third place	1991 Taipei	National team
Universiade
Bronze medal – third place	1993 Buffalo	National team

Trisha Stafford-Odom (née Stafford; born November 11, 1970) is an American basketball coach and former player. She is the head coach for the Charlotte Crown of the UpShot League. She played college basketball for the California Golden Bears from 1988 to 1992 and was a two-time first-team All-Pac-10 Conference selection. Stafford-Odom played professionally in the American Basketball League (ABL) from 1996 to 1998 for the San Jose Lasers and Long Beach Stingrays, in the Women's National Basketball Association (WNBA) from 2001 to 2002 for the Houston Comets and Miami Sol, and in the National Women's Basketball League (NWBL) from 2002 to 2003 for the Houston Stealth and Tennessee Fury. As part of the United States women's national basketball team, she won bronze medals at the 1991 R. William Jones Cup and the 1993 Summer Universiade.

Stafford-Odom began her coaching career as the head girls' basketball coach at her alma mater, Westchester High School, from 2002 to 2005. From 2005 to 2013, she was an assistant coach for the UCLA Bruins, Duke Blue Devils, and North Carolina Tar Heels. She was the head women's basketball coach for the Concordia Eagles from 2013 to 2016 and was named the Great Southwest Athletic Conference Coach of the Year for the 2014–15 season. She then served as the head coach of the North Carolina Central Eagles from 2017 to 2023.

== Early life ==
Trisha Stafford was born on November 11, 1970, in Ladera Heights, California. She attended Westchester High School in Los Angeles, California. She averaged 22.2 points and 11.5 rebounds per game as a senior and helped Westchester win the 4-A state championship, earning Cal-Hi Sports all-state recognition and sharing the Los Angeles City 4-A co-player of the year award with teammate Tammy Story (who she was also teammates with at the 1991 R. William Jones Cup). Stafford signed a letter of intent to play college basketball for the California Golden Bears of the University of California, Berkeley.

== College career ==
Stafford-Odom played college basketball for the California Golden Bears from 1988 to 1992. She appeared in 14 games her freshman year in 1988–89 and averaged 11.3 points, 5.9 rebounds, 1.3 assists, and 1.3 steals per game. She missed part of the season due to torn knee ligaments. Stafford-Odom played in 29 games during the 1989–90 season, averaging 7.8 points, 5.3 rebounds, 1.8 assists, and 1.0 steals. The 1989–90 Golden Bears finished with a 17–12 record, and advanced to the NCAA Division I women's basketball tournament for the first time in school history. Stafford-Odom played in 28 games during her junior year in 1990–91, averaging 17.8 points, 8.4 rebounds, 1.7 assists, and 1.3 steals, earning first-team All-Pac-10 Conference honors. She appeared in 19 games her senior year in 1991–92, averaging 22.3 points per game, 8.7 rebounds, 1.0 assists, and 1.8 steals per game, garnering Kodak honorable mention All-American, Basketball Times honorable mention All-American, Women's Basketball News Service second-team All-American, and first-team All-Pac-10 recognition. Her 22.3 points per game also led the Pac-10 that season. The 1991–92 Golden Bears had a 20–9 record and advanced to the NCAA tournament for the second time in school history. She graduated with a degree in mass communications in 1992. Stafford-Odom was named on the Golden Bears' 10-player All-Decade Team for 1986 to 1996. She was inducted into the Cal Athletic Hall of Fame in 2013.

== Professional career ==
After her college career, Stafford-Odom began her pro career by playing overseas, with stops in Italy, Spain, Israel, and Brazil. In June 1996, she was selected by the Richmond Rage of the American Basketball League (ABL) as an "alternate" in the league's inaugural draft. She then played in the 1996 Say No Classic summer league. Stafford-Odom signed with the San Jose Lasers of the ABL in September 1996. She played in 37 games, starting 18, for the Lasers during the 1996–97 season, averaging 11.5 points, 4.5 rebounds, 2.3 assists, and 1.9 steals. She also averaged 5.0 points, 2.0 rebounds, 3.0 assists, and 1.5 steals in two postseason games. In April 1997, she was among the first five players assigned to the expansion Long Beach Stingrays of the ABL. She appeared in 43 games, no starts, for the Stingrays in 1997–98, averaging 6.1 points, 2.7 rebounds, and 1.0 assists. The Stingrays finished the season with a 26–18 record. Stafford-Odom then played in 10 postseason games and averaged 5.4 points per game as the Stingrays advanced to the ABL championship series, where they lost to the Columbus Quest. In May 1998, Stafford-Odom was selected by the New England Blizzard in the second round, with the 19th overall pick, of the 1998 ABL draft. However, in July 1998, she rejected her contract offer from the Blizzard. She was signed by the Phoenix Mercury of the Women's National Basketball Association (WNBA) on May 25, 1999. She was waived on June 2, 1999, before the start of the season.

Stafford-Odom signed with the WNBA's Charlotte Sting on May 20, 2000, but was waived later that month. She signed with the Houston Comets of the WNBA on April 30, 2001. She played in 30 games, starting four, for the Comets during the 2001 season, averaging 3.8 points and 2.8 rebounds per game. Stafford-Odom also appeared in two playoff games, averaging 2.0 points, 1.5 rebounds, 1.0 steals, and 1.0 blocks per game. In December 2001, she was selected by the Houston Stealth of the National Women's Basketball League (NWBL) in the NWBL draft. She played for the Stealth during the WNBA offseason as the WNBA and NWBL seasons did not overlap. The Stealth finished the 2002 season with a 9–11 record. In the first round of the playoffs, Stafford-Odom scored 16 points and grabbed 17 rebounds as the Stealth beat the Springfield Spirit 90–80 in overtime. In the Stealth's second playoff game, Stafford-Odom scored with 1.7 seconds left to help the Stealth win against the Birmingham Power. In the NWBL Pro Cup title game, she scored 15 points in a 68–59 victory over the Chicago Blaze. She was waived by the Houston Comets on May 24, 2002. She was later signed by the Miami Sol of the WNBA on June 18, 2002. She played in six games for the Sol that year, averaging 1.3 points and 1.0 rebounds per game. In 2003, Stafford-Odom was assigned to the Tennessee Fury of the NWBL during midseason after her high school coaching season was over. The Fury advanced to the Pro Cup title game but lost to Stafford-Odom's former team, the Houston Stealth.

== National team career ==
Stafford-Odom was a member of the U.S. junior national team in 1990. She also played at the 1990 U.S. Olympic Festival. She was later a member of the U S. national team at the 1991 R. William Jones Cup, appearing in all seven of the team's games while averaging 8.7 points and 4.0 rebounds per game. The U.S. national team, which was composed of Pac-10 all-stars, finished with a 5–2 record at the R. William Jones Cup, earning a bronze medal. Stafford also won bronze at the 1993 Summer Universiade, where she was compared to Charles Barkley for her play as a "scorer, rebounder and part-time enforcer".

== Coaching career ==
Stafford-Odom was the head coach at her alma mater Westchester High School for three seasons from 2002 to 2005, helping more than 10 players earn college scholarships. She joined the UCLA Bruins coaching staff in July 2005. She was an assistant coach for the Bruins from 2005 to 2008 and also served as the team's recruiting coordinator from 2007 to 2008. Stafford-Odom was then an assistant coach and recruiting coordinator for the Duke Blue Devils from 2009 to 2011. In November 2009, Duke's 2010 recruiting class was rated No. 1 in the country by ESPN HoopGurlz. The 2010 class included Haley Peters, Chelsea Gray, Tricia Liston, Richa Jackson, and Chloe Wells. Stafford-Odom was then an assistant coach for the North Carolina Tar Heels from 2011 to 2013. She also assisted with recruiting at North Carolina, and the team's 2013 recruiting class was ranked No. 1 in the nation by the All Star Girls Report in November 2012. The 2013 class included Diamond DeShields, Allisha Gray, Stephanie Mavunga and Jessica Washington.

She was the head coach of the Concordia Eagles from 2013 to 2016. In 2014–15, the Eagles had a 23–7 record and won the Great Southwest Athletic Conference (GSAC) championship. They defeated the Carroll Fighting Saints in the first round of the 2015 NAIA Division I women's basketball tournament, which was the first NAIA tournament win in school history. The Eagles lost in the second round to the Bethel Wildcats. Stafford-Odom was named the GSAC Coach of the Year for 2014–15. In 2015–16, Concordia moved to NCAA Division II and played in the Pacific West Conference. After going 2–23 that season, Stafford-Odom stepped down as head coach in order to pursue Division I coaching jobs. She also earned a Master of Arts degree in coaching and athletic administration from Concordia in 2015.

Stafford-Odom was named the head coach of the Division I North Carolina Central Eagles in May 2017. In 2018–19, she led the Eagles to their first Division I postseason win in team history, defeating the Delaware State Hornets in the first round of the 2019 MEAC tournament. She led the team to a Division I school record 13 wins in 2019–20. They also finished fifth in the Mid-Eastern Athletic Conference (MEAC) with a 9–7 conference record, earning a bye in the first round of the 2020 MEAC tournament. They then defeated the North Carolina A&T Aggies in the quarterfinals, advancing to the MEAC semifinals for the first time in program history. However, the semifinal game was never played as the rest of the tournament was later cancelled due to the COVID-19 pandemic. Overall, Stafford-Odom served as the Eagles head coach from 2017 to 2023, accumulating an overall record of 55–108. She was released in September 2023.

In October 2025, Stafford-Odom was named the first head coach for the Charlotte Crown of the UpShot League.

== Personal life ==
Stafford-Odom married DeWayne Odom in 1999. They have two sons, Amari and Trajen. Amari plays football at Kennesaw State and Trajen is committed to play football at Ohio State University.

== Career statistics ==
Legend
GP	Games played	GS	Games started	MPG	Minutes per game	RPG	Rebounds per game
APG	Assists per game	SPG	Steals per game	BPG	Blocks per game	PPG	Points per game
TO	Turnovers per game	FG%	Field-goal percentage	3P%	3-point field-goal percentage	FT%	Free-throw percentage
**Bold**	Career best	°	League leader

=== WNBA ===
==== Regular season ====
WNBA regular season statistics
Year	Team	GP	GS	MPG	FG%	3P%	FT%	RPG	APG	SPG	BPG	TO	PPG
2001	Houston	**30**	**4**	12.2	**.368**	.000	.673	**2.8**	**0.5**	**0.4**	**0.1**	**0.9**	**3.8**
2002	Miami	6	0	6.3	.167	—	**.750**	1.0	0.3	0.2	0.0	1.0	1.3
**Career**	2 years, 2 teams	36	4	11.2	.357	.000	.683	2.5	0.5	0.4	0.1	0.9	3.4

==== Playoffs ====
WNBA playoff statistics
Year	Team	GP	GS	MPG	FG%	3P%	FT%	RPG	APG	SPG	BPG	TO	PPG
2001	Houston	2	0	8.0	.200	—	.500	1.5	0.5	1.0	1.0	0.0	2.0
**Career**	1 year, 1 team	2	0	8.0	.200	—	.500	1.5	0.5	1.0	1.0	0.0	2.0

=== College ===
Year	Team	GP	GS	MPG	FG%	3P%	FT%	RPG	APG	SPG	BPG	TO	PPG
1988–89	California	14	-	-	41.6	15.4	60.9	5.9	1.3	1.3	0.1	-	11.3
1989–90	California	**29**	-	-	41.4	0.0	65.9	5.3	**1.8**	1.0	0.1	-	7.8
1990–91	California	28	-	-	42.6	17.9	72.1	8.4	1.7	1.3	0.1	-	17.8
1991–92	California	**29**	-	-	**51.7**	**33.3**	**73.8**	**8.7**	1.0	**1.8**	0.1	-	**22.3**
**Career**		100	-	-	45.7	22.0	70.6	7.2	1.5	1.4	0.1	-	15.3
Statistics retrieved from Sports-Reference.

== Head coaching record ==
=== College ===
Record table
Season	Team	Overall	Conference	Standing	Postseason
Concordia (Great Southwest Athletic Conference) (2013–2015)
2013–14	Concordia	12–15	5–9		
2014–15	Concordia	23–7	14–2		NAIA Second Round
Concordia (Pacific West Conference) (2015–2016)
2015–16	Concordia	2–23	1–19	14th	
Concordia:		37–45 (.451)	20–30 (.400)		
North Carolina Central (Mid-Eastern Athletic Conference) (2017–2023)
2017–18	North Carolina Central	9–21	7–9	T-7th	
2018–19	North Carolina Central	9–22	5–11	T-8th	
2019–20	North Carolina Central	13–17	9–7	5th	
2020–21	North Carolina Central	4–12	2–6	5th	
2021–22	North Carolina Central	5–20	3–11	7th	
2022–23	North Carolina Central	15–16	8–6	4th	
North Carolina Central:		55–108 (.337)	34–50 (.405)		
Total:		92–153 (.376)			
National champion Postseason invitational champion Conference regular season champion Conference regular season and conference tournament champion Division regular season champion Division regular season and conference tournament champion Conference tournament champion
