= San Jose Spiders (NWBL) =

Basketball team

- Sport: Basketball
- Founded: 2004
- League: National Women's Basketball League
- Based in: San Jose, California
- Arena: De Anza College; Cupertino, California
- Colors: Red and Black
- Owner: Ronald Anthony Grant
- Head coach: Fred Chmiel
- Cheerleaders: Lady Spiders

The San Jose Spiders were a women's professional basketball team in the National Women's Basketball League (NWBL). Based in San Jose, California, they played from 2005 to 2006. In 2005, the Spiders went 5–19. In 2006, San Jose improved to a 8–10 in the regular season under new head coach Fred Chmiel. They lost to Colorado in the semi-final and defeated San Francisco in the third place game, making their record 9–11. Notable players included Brittany Jackson, Julie McBride, Lindsey Yamasaki, and Natalie Nakase.

== Game log ==
=== 2006 Season ===
2005–06 game log
Total: 9–11 (Home: 5–5; Road: 4–6)
February: 4–3 (home: 3–0; road: 1–3)

Game	Date	Team	Score	High points	High rebounds	High assists	Location Attendance	Record
1	February 4	San Francisco	89-61	Brittany Jackson (22)	Tied (6)	Lindsey Yamasaki (7)	DeAnza College	1–0
2	February 6	@ Colorado	73-80	Cisti Greenwalt (21)	Cisti Greenwalt (9)	Brittany Jackson (4)	Budweiser Events Center; 1,791	2–1
3	February 12	San Diego	72-70	Brittany Jackson (21)	Julie McBride (8)	Julie McBride (6)	DeAnza College	2–1
4	February 18	@ San Diego	80-89	Julie McBride (22)	Tied (7)	Lindsey Yamasaki (4)	Harry West Gymnasium	2–2
5	February 23	@ San Francisco	94-73	Tied (16)	Shanika Freeman (8)	Constance Jinks (4)	San Francisco State University	3–2
6	February 26	San Francisco	82-59	Brittany Jackson (15)	Tied (7)	Julie McBride (9)	DeAnza College	4–2
7	February 28	@ San Diego	95-99	Caity Matter (23)	Katie Bulger (5)	Julie McBride (9)	Harry West Gymnasium	4–3

March : 4–7 (home: 1–5; road: 3–2)

Game	Date	Team	Score	High points	High rebounds	High assists	Location Attendance	Record
8	March 3	Colorado	70-81	Cisti Greenwalt (15)	Tied (7)	Brittany Jackson (3)	DeAnza College	4–4
9	March 4	San Diego	67-69	Cisti Greenwalt (28)	Cherie Sam (8)	Julie McBride (8)	DeAnza College	4–5
10	March 7	@ San Diego	72-101	Cisti Greenwalt (13)	Cherie Sam (8)	Tied (3)	Harry West Gymnasium	4–6
11	March 11	Colorado	72-78	Cisti Greenwalt (20)	Cisti Greenwalt (10)	Cherie Sam (6)	DeAnza College	4–7
12	March 12	@ San Francisco	118-83	Julie McBride (22)	Cisti Greenwalt (8)	Caity Matter (9)	Ira Jenkins Center	5–7
13	March 14	@ Colorado	82-92	Cherie Sam (22)	Lindsey Yamasaki (6)	Brittany Jackson (4)	Budweiser Events Center	5–8
14	March 17	San Diego	69-70	Cisti Greenwalt (18)	Cisti Greenwalt (12)	Cherie Sam (4)	DeAnza College	5–9
15	March 18	San Francisco	81-49	Brittany Jackson (26)	Cisti Greenwalt (10)	Lindsey Yamasaki (6)	DeAnza College	6–9
16	March 19	@ Colorado	105-97	Brittany Jackson (30)	Cherie Sam (12)	Cherie Sam (8)	Budweiser Events Center; 1,893	7–9
17	March 25	Colorado	99-101	Tied (20)	Cisti Greenwalt (10)	Cherie Sam (6)	DeAnza College	7–10
18	March 26	@ San Francisco	93-89	Cisti Greenwalt (31)	Cisti Greenwalt (5)	Constance Jinks (4)	Ira Jenkins Center	8–10

March (Playoffs) : 1–1 (home: 1–0; road: 0–1)

Game	Date	Team	Score	High points	High rebounds	High assists	Location Attendance	Record
1	March 30	@ Colorado	74-97	Cherie Sam (18)	N/A	N/A	Budweiser Events Center	8–11
2	March 31	San Francisco	99-94	Cisti Greenwalt (27)	Cisti Greenwalt (13)	N/A	Budweiser Events Center	9–11

=== 2005 Season ===
2004–05 game log
Total: 5–19 (Home: 4–8; Road: 1–11)
January: 0–6 (home: 0–3; road: 0–3)

Game	Date	Team	Score	High points	High rebounds	High assists	Location Attendance	Record
1	January 16	Lubbock	74-78	Andrea Garner (22)	Tied (3)	Natalie Nakase (4)	DeAnza College	0–1
2	January 17	@ Colorado	61-77	Andrea Garner (15)	Amisha Carter (11)	Crickett Williams (3)	Budweiser Events Center; 1,399	0–2
3	January 21	@ Lubbock	54-73	Amisha Carter (18)	Andrea Garner (12)	Crickett Williams (4)	Rip Griffin Center; 910	0–3
4	January 22	@ Dallas	53-70	Monica Roberts (14)	Andrea Garner (11)	Natalie Nakase (4)	Hebron High School; 357	0–4
5	January 23	Dallas	50-72	Erica Glover (12)	Andrea Garner (8)	Erica Glover (5)	DeAnza College; 350	0–5
6	January 30	Birmingham	56-62	Andrea Garner (14)	Andrea Garner (9)	Tied (2)	DeAnza College	0–6

February : 2–8 (home: 2–2; road: 0–6)

Game	Date	Team	Score	High points	High rebounds	High assists	Location Attendance	Record
7	February 5	@ Chicago	57-86	Barbie Carmichael (14)	Andrea Garner (12)	Tied (4)	North Central College	0–7
8	February 6	@ Birmingham	61-68	Amanda Lassiter (19)	Tied (6)	Natalie Nakase (7)	Boutwell Auditorium; 216	0–8
9	February 12	Birmingham	71-60	Amisha Carter (18)	Tera Bjorklund (8)	Amanda Lassiter (5)	DeAnza College	1–8
10	February 13	@ Colorado	54-89	Amisha Carter (20)	Monica Roberts (7)	Natalie Nakase (3)	Budweiser Events Center; 1,930	1–9
11	February 15	@ Lubbock	49-71	Amisha Carter (16)	Amisha Carter (8)	-	Trinity Christian	1–10
12	February 16	@ Dallas	63-73	Amisha Carter (18)	Amisha Carter (11)	Natalie Nakase (5)	Hebron High School; 150	1–11
13	February 19	Colorado	74-81	Amisha Carter (17)	Tera Bjorklund (6)	Natalie Nakase (4)	DeAnza College; 350	1–12
14	February 20	Lubbock	52-63	Natalie Nakase (13)	Amisha Carter (8)	Tied (2)	DeAnza College; 250	1–13
15	February 26	Colorado	72-69	Amisha Carter (22)	Amisha Carter (13)	Amanda Lassiter (5)	DeAnza College; 200	2–13
16	February 27	@ Colorado	65-77	Amisha Carter (21)	Tera Bjorklund (7)	Erica Glover (4)	Budweiser Events Center; 1,694	2–14

March: 3–5 (home: 2–3; road: 1–2)

Game	Date	Team	Score	High points	High rebounds	High assists	Location Attendance	Record
17	March 4	@ Birmingham	64-56	Amisha Carter (23)	Amisha Carter (11)	Natalie Nakase (3)	Boutwell Auditorium	3–14
18	March 5	@ Chicago	49-65	Barbie Carmichael (13)	Amanda Lassiter (10)	Tied (1)	North Central College; 202	3–15
19	March 12	Chicago	55-57	Erica Glover (15)	Tera Bjorklund (6)	Natalie Nakase (8)	DeAnza College; 250	3–16
20	March 13	Lubbock	87-97	Amisha Carter (30)	Tera Bjorklund (9)	Natalie Nakase (8)	DeAnza College; 150	3–17
21	March 18	@ Chicago	42-85	Natalie Nakase (10)	Tied (3)	Natalie Nakase (4)	North Central College; 278	3–18
22	March 19	Dallas	59-92	Amisha Carter (10)	Andrea Garner (5)	Tied (3)	DeAnza College; 200	3–19
23	March 26	Chicago	65-58	Tera Bjorklund (13)	Andrea Garner (12)	Natalie Nakase (6)	DeAnza College; 250	4–19
24	March 27	Colorado	75-63	Amanda Lassiter (18)	Amisha Carter (10)	Natalie Nakase (5)	DeAnza College	5–19
