= MassMutual Center =

Multi-purpose arena and convention center

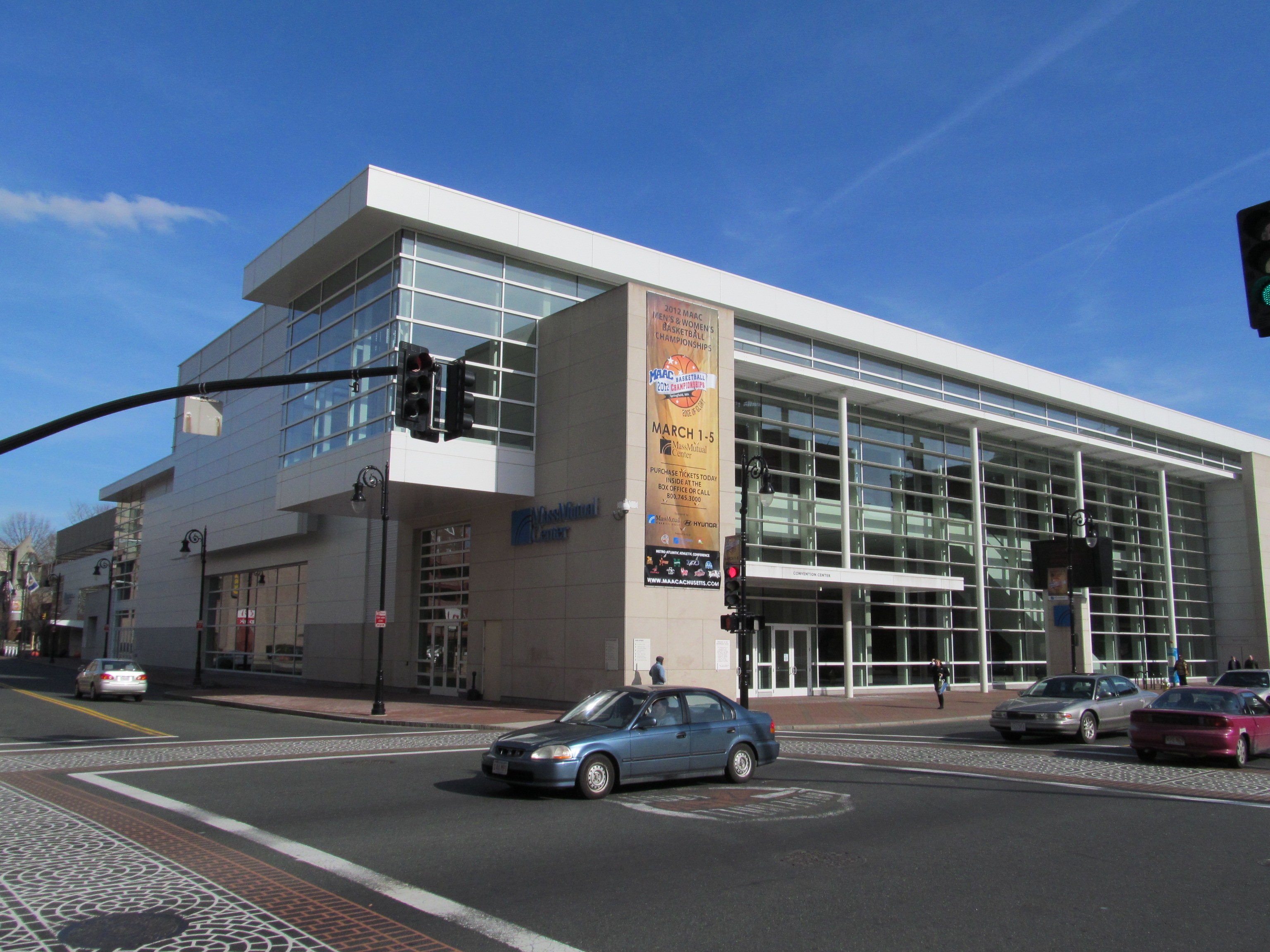

- Location within Massachusetts Location within the United States
- Former names: Springfield Civic Center (1972–2005)
- Address: 1277 Main Street
- Location: Springfield, Massachusetts
- Coordinates: 42°6′8″N 72°35′13″W
- Owner: City of Springfield (1972–1997); Massachusetts Convention Center Authority (1997–present)
- Operator: MGM Springfield
- Capacity: Center Stage: 9,300; Basketball: 7,300; Ice hockey: 6,793
- Public transit: Springfield Union Station: Hartford Line

Construction
- Groundbreaking: March 18, 1970
- Opened: September 5, 1972
- Renovated: 2003–2005
- Cost: $10.3 million ($79.3 million in 2025 dollars) $71 million (renovation) ($117 million in 2025 dollars)
- Architects: Catalano Architects Inc. Sasaki Associates (renovation)

Tenants
- Springfield Kings/Indians (AHL) (1972–1994); Hartford Whalers (NHL) (1979–1980); Springfield Fame (USBL) (1985–1986); Springfield Falcons (AHL) (1994–2016); Springfield Spirit (NWBL) (2002–2004); Springfield Armor (NBA D-League) (2009–2014); Springfield Thunderbirds (AHL) (2016–present); American International Yellow Jackets (NCAA) (2016–2025)

Website
- massmutualcenter.com

The MassMutual Center (formerly Springfield Civic Center) is a multi-purpose arena and convention center complex located in downtown Springfield, Massachusetts, United States, in the city's Metro Center. The arena opened in 1972 and the convention center opened in 2005. It serves as a venue for meetings, conventions, exhibitions, sporting and entertainment events.

Previously owned and operated by the City of Springfield and various management groups until 1997, the city transferred ownership of the facility to the Massachusetts Legislature. Shortly after, ownership was given to the Massachusetts Convention Center Authority (MCCA) who in turn began working on plans to renovate and expand the facility. The two-year project, which began in 2003, included renovations to the 8,000-seat arena and the addition of a convention center. Its unique design allows for 3 to 4 concurrent events or one large event.

MGM Springfield began operating the venue on behalf of the MCCA in July 2017 in advance of its casino/hotel/retail development opening the next year.

In 2005, the venue was renamed when Massachusetts Mutual Life Insurance Company entered into a 15-year naming rights agreement for the arena and convention center. The name change took place on September 29, 2005.

The venue is home to the Springfield Thunderbirds of the American Hockey League and American International Yellow Jackets who compete in NCAA Men's Division I Ice Hockey.

== Renovations ==
=== Arena ===
In the fall of 2003, the renovation project was publicly announced and demolition of the bank sitting next to the building, along with the facility's plaza and exhibit hall began. Springfield-based contractor Fontaine Bros. was awarded the contract for the renovation and the construction of the new center. In the fall of 2005, the $71 million renovation project was completed. The renovation included a new arena floor with new pipelines for the ice rink and new chillers installed. Upgrades to the building’s electrical system as well as the heating and air conditioning system with a new dehumidification system were also installed. Audio and Video upgrades were made with a new four-sided center hung scoreboard with video display and a new sound system. The project also included a new seating arrangement with 6,455 permanent seats and 222 club seats. New amenities to the arena include a bar and lounge, clubroom, an executive suite, new larger restrooms, and 11 newly refurbished concession stands. The main entrance was relocated from Main Street to Bruce Landon Way where a new box office and lobby were added. The arena was still operational during the two-year project which was funded by city and state tax payers and other state funds.

The main entrance for the arena is located on Bruce Landon Way. The arena has 3 levels:

- Event Level: Box Office, Administrative Offices, Thunderbirds Office and Team Store.
- Concourse Level: Lower and Upper Bowl Seating, Center Grille Restaurant, Breakaway Bar & Lounge.
- Upper Level: Broadcast booths, The Executive Perch, Executive Suites

In the summer of 2015 the MCCA approved a multimillion-dollar technology upgrade to the venue. This project consisted of a new 18-by-12-foot (5.5 m × 3.7 m) 4 sided center hung LED video board that replaced the existing scoreboard in the arena as well as the replacement of the arena lighting system to new LED lighting.

=== Convention Center ===
With renovations to the existing arena, a new convention center was added. With 100,000 sq ft (9,300 m^{2}), it is the largest convention center in Western Massachusetts. It includes two exhibition halls, which total over 40,000 sq ft (3,700 m^{2}), three ballrooms that total 15,000 sq ft (1,400 m^{2}) with back of house kitchen, five meeting rooms that total some 9,000 sq ft (840 m^{2}), and 21,000 sq ft (2,000 m^{2}) of pre-function space. It connects both the convention center and arena to add an additional 19,000 sq ft (1,800 m^{2}) of floor space. Additionally, the pre-function space overlooks the city skyline, including a viewing area known as the glass alcove which gives panoramic views of downtown. The convention center is able to host galas, weddings, consumer and trade shows, concerts, conventions, conferences, and many other functions of various sizes.

The main entrance for the convention center is located on Main Street and Bruce Landon Way. There are 2 levels:

- Event Level: Meeting Rooms 1–5, Exhibition Halls A & B
- Upper Level: Ballrooms A, B, and C, Glass Alcove

== History ==
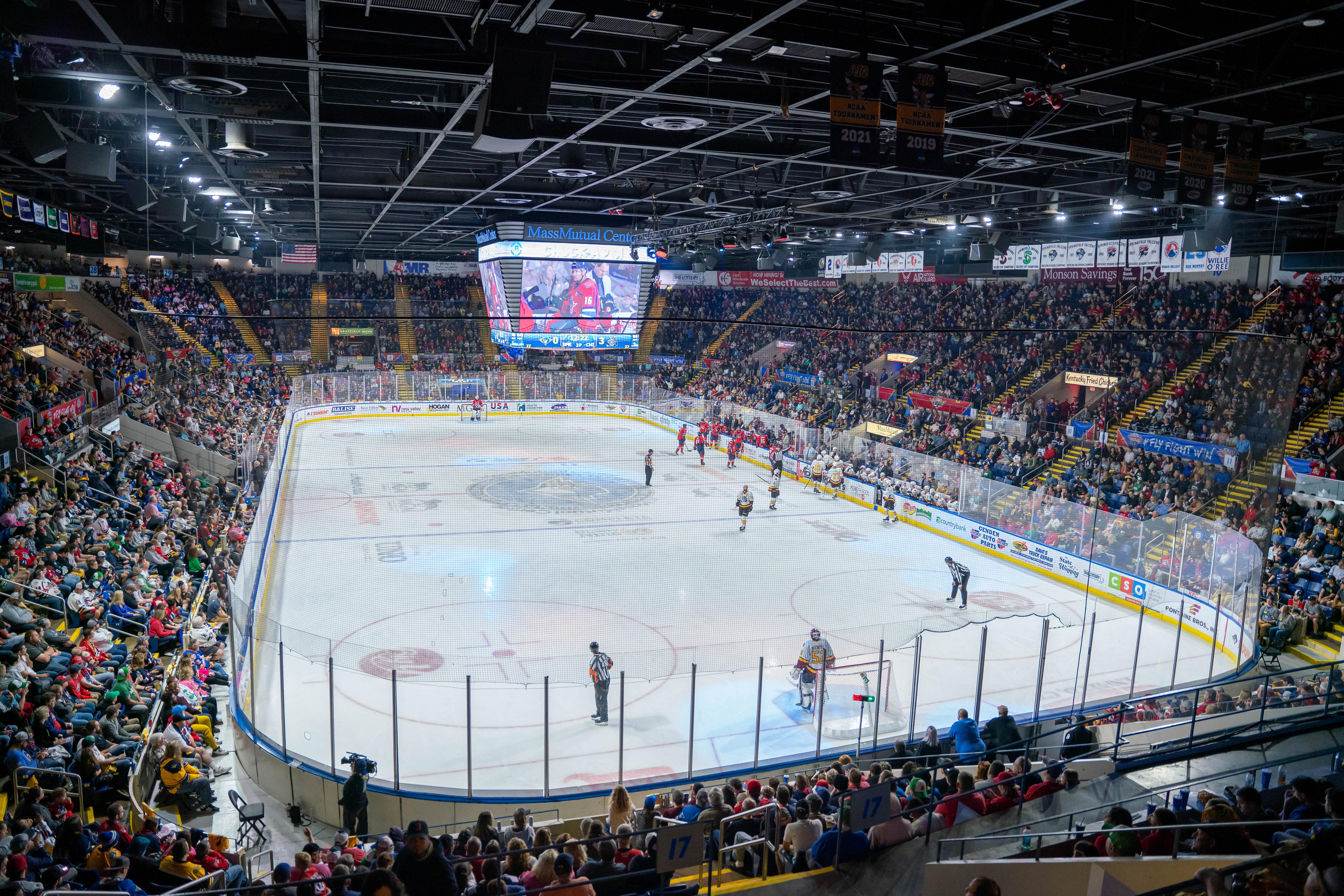
The MassMutual Center in 2022

The arena hosted the Hartford Whalers of the World Hockey Association and National Hockey League and the Hartford Hellions Of the Major Indoor Soccer League (1978-1992) while the Hartford Civic Center was undergoing renovations, because of a 1978 roof collapse. The arena hosted 59 regular season WHA games alongside playoff games in 1978 and 1979.

The arena hosted World Wrestling Federation's Saturday Night's Main Event XVI (the first episode following Wrestlemania IV, taped on April 22, 1988, aired on April 30). It also hosted the 19th WWF In Your House pay-per-view in 1997. The center has also hosted WWE Monday Night RAW and two WWE SmackDown! shows; the first one was on October 26, 1999, aired for that Thursday, and the second was on December 13, 2005, aired for that Friday. The center was also where The Mountie (Jacques Rougeau) defeated Bret "Hitman" Hart for the WWF Intercontinental Championship on January 17, 1992. He would lose the title two days later to Rowdy Roddy Piper at the Knickerbocker Arena in Albany, New York at the Royal Rumble.

The building has hosted an American Hockey League franchise, since it opened in 1972. Between the 1972–73 AHL season and 1993–94 AHL season, the building hosted the Springfield Indians franchise. Since 1994, the center was the home of the Springfield Falcons. The Falcons won the Northeast Division Championship in the 2012–13 and 2013–14 seasons while serving as the AHL affiliate of the Columbus Blue Jackets. The team was sold in May 2016 to the Arizona Coyotes and relocated to Tucson, Arizona. The Falcons were immediately replaced with the Springfield Thunderbirds for the 2016–17 season.

The building, located in the "Birthplace of Basketball", has also hosted numerous NCAA Men's Division II Basketball Championships, first in 1977, then from 1980 to 1994, and finally 2006 through 2011. The tournament moved to the Kentucky suburbs of Cincinnati in 2012 and 2013. It also hosted the first six NCAA Women's Division II Basketball Championships from 1982 to 1987.

The UMass Minutemen basketball team, formerly under head coach and Springfield native Derek Kellogg, has used the building for a home game since 2010. In 2011, the Basketball Hall of Fame created the Holiday Showcase which feature the UMass Minutemen basketball team. Brigham Young University visited the UMass Minutemen during the 2013 showcase with a sold-out crowd of 7,331.

The Springfield Armor of the NBA D-League joined the building's roster of home tenants in the fall of 2009. The franchise was purchased by the HWS Group in early 2009, and was quickly moved to Springfield for the start of the 2009–2010 season. It was affiliated with the NBA's New York Knicks, the Philadelphia 76ers, and the New Jersey Nets for two years. The New Jersey Nets, now known as the Brooklyn Nets as of 2012, became the sole affiliate of the Armor in the start of the 2011–2012 season. The Armor received their first Eastern Division Championship during the 2011–2012 season under its new head coach Bob MacKinnon. They won their final home game on March 21, 2014, in front of a sold-out crowd of 7,111.

== NHL games ==
Date	Away	Score	Home	Attendance
October 19, 1979	Los Angeles Kings	3–6	Hartford Whalers	7,626
October 26, 1979	New York Islanders	2–1	Hartford Whalers	7,267
November 2, 1979	Toronto Maple Leafs	3–5	Hartford Whalers	7,643
November 9, 1979	Chicago Black Hawks	4–2	Hartford Whalers	7,618
November 17, 1979	Edmonton Oilers	0–4	Hartford Whalers	7,627
November 21, 1979	Buffalo Sabres	3–5	Hartford Whalers	7,627
November 24, 1979	Quebec Nordiques	4–4	Hartford Whalers	7,627
November 25, 1979	Atlanta Flames	2–4	Hartford Whalers	7,627
November 30, 1979	Pittsburgh Penguins	5–7	Hartford Whalers	7,627
December 7, 1979	New York Rangers	7–4	Hartford Whalers	7,627
December 19, 1979	Washington Capitals	5–4	Hartford Whalers	7,100
December 22, 1979	Buffalo Sabres	4–2	Hartford Whalers	7,627
December 26, 1979	Philadelphia Flyers	4–4	Hartford Whalers	7,627
January 4, 1980	Washington Capitals	6–3	Hartford Whalers	7,623
January 6, 1980	Detroit Red Wings	2–1	Hartford Whalers	7,627
January 17, 1980	Pittsburgh Penguins	1–7	Hartford Whalers	7,627
January 19, 1980	Chicago Black Hawks	3–5	Hartford Whalers	7,627
January 21, 1980	Winnipeg Jets	2–7	Hartford Whalers	7,627
January 24, 1980	Montreal Canadiens	7–2	Hartford Whalers	7,627
January 28, 1980	Atlanta Flames	1–6	Hartford Whalers	7,627
January 30, 1980	Boston Bruins	2–8	Hartford Whalers	7,627
February 3, 1980	New York Islanders	3–7	Hartford Whalers	7,627

== International hockey ==
Date	Away	Score	Home	Attendance
December 29, 1995	Switzerland	3–4	United States	–
December 29, 1995	Russia	5–2	Sweden	–

== UMass HOF Games ==
Date	Away	Score	Home	Attendance
November 20, 2010	New Mexico State	57–71	UMass Minutemen	2,274
November 22, 2010	TCU	48–67	UMass Minutemen	1,512
December 9, 2011	Siena	78–82	UMass Minutemen	4,236
December 15, 2012	Elon	73–78 OT	UMass Minutemen	3,085
December 7, 2013	BYU	96–105	UMass Minutemen	7,331*
December 7, 2014	Florida Gulf Coast	84–75	UMass Minutemen	5,235
December 5, 2015	Ole Miss Rebels	74–64	UMass Minutemen	3,765
December 17, 2022	North Texas	62–44	UMass Minutemen	3,426
December 16, 2023	West Virginia	79–87	UMass Minutemen	4,264
December 21, 2024	Arizona State	78-62	UMass Minutemen	3,252
December 10, 2025	Boston College	74-76	UMass Minutemen	5,853

== Notable events ==
The MassMutual Center has hosted numerous events over the years ranging from professional and college sporting events, concert and comedy tours, ice skating and family shows, commencement ceremonies, and other functions both private and public. On April 6, 1986, the Kiss "Asylum" tour concert overloaded the power system and the concert was halted after the first song. The band exited the stage, but returned 30–40 minutes later and resumed the show without incident.

=== Sports ===
- The National Collegiate Athletic Association's (NCAA) men's college basketball Division I ECAC New England Region tournament organized by the Eastern College Athletic Conference (ECAC) in 1975 and 1976.
- NCAA Division II Men's Basketball Championships (1980–1994, 2006–2011)
- Freestyle Motorcross 2008
- North American Grappling Association East Coast Championship (2010 and 2011)
- Naismith Memorial Basketball Hall of Fame Tip-Off Classic 2010
- Metro Atlantic Athletic Conference Men's and Women's Basketball Championships (2012–2014)
- 1996 edition of the Skate America figure skating competition
- 1996 World Junior Ice Hockey Championships Group Stage games
- 2019 AHL All-Star Game
- 2024 NCAA Division I Men's Ice Hockey East Regional

=== Concerts ===
- Queen – News of the World Tour 1977
- Kansas – Point of Know Return Tour 1977
- Bon Jovi – Slippery When Wet Tour 1987
- Yes – 90125 1984
- Van Halen – World Vacation Tour 1979
- The Who – The Who By Numbers Tour 1975
- The Jacksons – The Jackson 5 World Tour 1974, Destiny World Tour 1979.
- Elvis Presley in Concert 1975 and 1976
- Bob Dylan – Rolling Thunder Revue Tour 1975
- Bruce Springsteen – Darkness on the Edge Tour 1978
- KISS – Destroyer Tour 1976, Alive II Tour 1978, Dynasty Tour 1979, Asylum Tour 1986, and Alive/Worldwide Tour 1997
- Grateful Dead in Concert - ten shows in total spanning 1972, 1973, 1974, 1977, 1978, January and October in 1979, 1980, and two in March 1985.
- Earth, Wind & Fire in Concert 1978
- Black Sabbath – Born Again Tour 1984 (Last show with Deep Purple's Ian Gillan on vocals and rebroadcast on the King Biscuit Flower Hour FM broadcast.)
- AC/DC- 'Blow Up Your Video' Tour 1988
- Anthrax, Exodus and Helloween – Headbangers Ball Tour 1989
- Aerosmith – Pump Tour 1989 and 1990 featuring Skid Row
- Nirvana in Concert 1993
- Pantera- Far Beyond Touring the World 1994
- Mötley Crüe – Carnival of Sins Tour 2006
- Celtic Woman – A New Journey Tour 2007 and Voices of Angels World Tour 2017
- Martina McBride – Waking Up Laughing Tour 2007
- Sugarland – CMT on Tour 2007 featuring Little Big Town and Jake Owen
- Blue Man Group – How to Be a Megastar Tour 2008
- Three Days Grace – Life Starts Now Tour 2010 featuring Chevelle and Adelitas Way
- Avenged Sevenfold – Welcome to the Family Tour 2011 featuring Three Days Grace and Bullet for My Valentine
- Wisin y Yandel – Los Vaqueros:El Regreso Tour 2011
- Mid-West Rock and Roll Express Tour 2013 featuring Styx, REO Speedwagon, and Ted Nugent
- Shinedown in Concert 2013 featuring Bush and Airbourne
- Pitbull – Global Warming Tour 2013
- Justin Moore – Off the Beaten Path Tour 2014 featuring Josh Thompson and Randy Houser
- Alan Jackson – Keepin' It Country Tour 2015 featuring Jon Pardi and Brandy Clark
- Stevie Wonder – The Stevie Wonder Song Party: A Celebration of Life, Love & Music Tour 2018
- Cher – Here We Go Again Tour 2019 featuring Nile Rogers and Chic
- Aerosmith – Deuces Are Wild East Coast Tour 2019

=== Other events ===
- WWF - Saturday Night's Main Event XVI – 1988
- WWE – In Your House Degeneration X PPV 1997
- Larry the Cable Guy – 2008 Tour
- Louis C.K. – 2016 Tour
- Amy Schumer – 2016 Tour
- Bill Burr – 2018 Tour
- George Lopez, Cedric the Entertainer, Eddie Griffin, and D. L. Hughley – The Comedy Get Down Tour 2018
- Basketball Hall of Fame Enshrinement Class of 2021
- John Mulaney – 2022 From Scratch Tour

=== Conventions and conferences ===
- Daughters of the Nile 2007 Convention
- Market America Northeast Convention 2010–2012
- Brewery Collectibles Club of America CANvention 2012
- Bay Path University Women's Leadership Conference
- 64th National Square Dance 2015 Convention
- Democratic State Convention 2019
- Red Sox Winter Weekend 2020
- Bernie Sanders rally the weekend ahead of Massachusetts Democratic Primary 2020

Events and tenants
Preceded by Cross Insurance Arena	Home of the Springfield Thunderbirds; 2016–present	Succeeded by current home
Preceded by none	Home of the Springfield Falcons; 1994–2016	Succeeded by Tucson Convention Center
Preceded by Anaheim Convention Center	Home of the Springfield Armor; 2009–2014	Succeeded by DeltaPlex Arena
Preceded by Hartford Civic Center	Home of the New England Whalers; 1978–1980	Succeeded by Hartford Civic Center
Preceded by Eastern States Coliseum	Home of the Springfield Indians; 1972–1994	Succeeded by Worcester Centrum
