= List of professional sports teams in Alabama =

Alabama has several minor league professional and semi-professional teams, including three minor league baseball teams. It does not currently have any major professional sports league teams. However, Alabama has intermittently been home to teams in what were widely considered (and/or at least aspired to become) major leagues during their presence in the state. Additionally, Major League Baseball has retroactively recognized several Negro Leagues as major leagues; as a result, the Birmingham Black Barons are now considered to have been a major league baseball team.

Currently, Alabama is the second-most populous U.S. state without a major league franchise (it is the most populous if one considers Virginia to be the home of the NFL's Washington Commanders and NHL's Washington Capitals - those teams have their practice facilities and operational headquarters in Northern Virginia although neither team plays its home games there).

== Current minor-league professional and semi-professional teams ==
Club	City	Sport	League	Venue
AFC Mobile	Mobile	Soccer	National Premier Soccer League	Archbishop Lipscomb Athletic Complex
Alabama Blackhawks	Birmingham	Football	Amateur to Professional Developmental League	Carver High School
Alabama Steel Semi Pro Football	Prattville	Football	Amateur to Professional Developmental League	Central High School
Birmingham Vulcans	Birmingham	Basketball	North American Basketball League	Young Stars Basketball Academy
Dixie Derby Girls	Huntsville	Roller derby	Women's Flat Track Derby Association	Von Braun Center
Birmingham Legion FC	Birmingham	Soccer	USL Championship	Protective Stadium
Birmingham Barons	Birmingham	Baseball	Southern League	Regions Field
Birmingham Black Widows	Birmingham	Football	Women's Indoor Football League	Venue unknown
Birmingham Squadron	Birmingham	Basketball	NBA G League	Legacy Arena
Birmingham Stallions	Birmingham	Football	United Football League	Protective Stadium
Central Alabama Jaguars	Montgomery	Basketball	The Basketball League	Venue unknown
Huntsville City FC	Huntsville	Soccer	MLS Next Pro	Joe W. Davis Stadium
Huntsville Rockets Semi-Pro Football	Huntsville	Football	Gridiron Developmental Football League	Milton Frank Stadium
Huntsville Havoc	Huntsville	Ice hockey	Southern Professional Hockey League	Von Braun Center
Magic City Surge	Birmingham	Basketball	American Basketball Association	Bill Harris Arena
Marvel City Tigers	Bessemer	Football	Gridiron Developmental Football League	Snitz Snider Stadium
Montgomery Biscuits	Montgomery	Baseball	Southern League	Dabos Park
Rocket City Trash Pandas	Madison	Baseball	Southern League	Toyota Field
South Alabama Hurricanes	Baldwin County–Gulf Shores	American football	Xtreme South Football League	Gulf Shores Sportsplex- Mickey Miller Blackwell Stadium
Huntsville Tigers	Huntsville	Football	Independent Women's Football League	Milton Frank Stadium
Birmingham Bulls	Pelham, Alabama	Ice hockey	Southern Professional Hockey League	Pelham Civic Complex

== Former professional and semi-professional teams ==
Club	City	Sport	League	Years active	Fate
Alabama Outlawz	Birmingham	Indoor football	X-League Indoor Football, Arena Pro Football	2014–2015, 2017	Attempted to restart again in 2017, but folded prior to playing any home games
Birmingham A's	Birmingham	Baseball	Southern League	1967–1975	Defunct
Birmingham Black Barons	Birmingham	Baseball	Negro Southern League, Negro National League, Negro American League	1920–1960	Defunct
Rocket City United	Madison	Soccer	National Premier Soccer League	2007–2013	Defunct
Mobile A's	Mobile	Baseball	Southern League		
Mobile BayBears	Mobile	Baseball	Southern League	1997–2019	Relocated to Madison as the Rocket City Trash Pandas
Mobile Black Bears	Mobile	Baseball	Independent Negro league team		
Mobile Soldiers	Mobile	Baseball	Southern League		
Mobile White Sox	Mobile	Baseball	Southern League		
Montgomery Grays	Montgomery	Baseball	South Atlantic League		
Montgomery Grey Sox	Montgomery	Baseball	Negro Southern League	1932	Defunct
Montgomery Rebels	Montgomery	Baseball	Southern League	1903–1980 (various years)	Relocated to Birmingham
Montgomery Wings	Montgomery	Baseball	Southeastern League	2002–2003	Defunct
Ozark Patriots	Ozark	Baseball	Southeastern League	2002	Defunct
Selma Cloverleafs	Selma	Baseball	Southeastern League	2002–2003	
Birmingham Bulldogs	Birmingham	Basketball	World Basketball Association	2004–2005	Defunct
Birmingham Magicians	Birmingham	Basketball	American Basketball Association	2005–2006	Defunct
Birmingham Power	Birmingham	Basketball	National Women's Basketball League	2001–2005	Defunct
Druid City Dragons	Tuscaloosa	Basketball	World Basketball Association	2006	Defunct
Huntsville Flight	Huntsville	Basketball	National Basketball Development League	2001–2005	Relocated to Albuquerque, New Mexico
Mobile Revelers	Mobile	Basketball	National Basketball Development League	2001–2003	Defunct
Mobile Majesty	Mobile	Basketball	National Women's Basketball League	2001	Defunct
Southern Alabama Bounce	Mobile	Basketball	American Basketball Association	2006–2007	Defunct
Birmingham Barracudas	Birmingham	Canadian football	Canadian Football League	1995	Defunct
Alabama Renegades	Huntsville	Football	National Women's Football Association	2000–2008	Defunct, league folded
Alabama Hawks	Huntsville	Football	Continental Football League	1968–1969	Defunct, league folded
Alabama Slammers	Birmingham	Football	Women's American Football League	2001–2002	Defunct
Alabama Vulcans	Birmingham	Football	American Football Association	1979	Defunct
Birmingham Americans	Birmingham	Football	World Football League	1974	Defunct
Birmingham Fire	Birmingham	Football	World League of American Football	1991–1992	Defunct, league shut down U.S. operations and became NFL Europe before eventually folding
Birmingham Iron	Birmingham	Football	Alliance of American Football	2019	Defunct, league folded
Birmingham Stallions	Birmingham	Football	United States Football League	1983–1985	Defunct, league folded
Birmingham Steel Magnolias	Birmingham	Football	Women's Football Association	2002–2003	Defunct, league folded
Birmingham Thunderbolts	Birmingham	Football	XFL	2001	Defunct, league folded
Birmingham Vulcans	Birmingham	Football	World Football League	1975	Defunct, league folded
Gadsden Raiders	Gadsden	Football	Southern Professional Football League	1963–?	
Huntsville Rockets	Huntsville	Football	Southern Professional Football League	1963–1964	
Muscle Shoals SmasHers	Muscle Shoals	Football	National Women's Football Association	2004	Defunct
Tuscaloosa Warriors	Tuscaloosa	Football	Southern Professional Football League	1963	Relocated to Columbus, Mississippi
Alabama Slammers	Pelham	Ice hockey	World Hockey Association 2	2003–2004	Defunct
Birmingham Bulls (1)	Birmingham	Ice hockey	World Hockey Association, Central Hockey League	1976–1981	Defunct
Birmingham Bulls (2)	Birmingham	Ice hockey	East Coast Hockey League	1992–2001	Relocated to Atlantic City, New Jersey
Birmingham South Stars	Birmingham	Ice hockey	Central Hockey League	1982–1983	Defunct
Huntsville Blast	Huntsville	Ice hockey	East Coast Hockey League	1993–1994	Relocated to Tallahassee, Florida
Huntsville Channel Cats/Tornado	Huntsville	Ice hockey	Southern Hockey League, Central Hockey League, South East Hockey League	1995–2001, 2003–2004	Defunct
Mobile Mysticks	Mobile	Ice hockey	East Coast Hockey League	1995–2002	Relocated to Duluth, Georgia
Birmingham/Alabama Steeldogs	Birmingham	Indoor football	AF2	2000–2007	Defunct
Tennessee Valley/Alabama Vipers	Huntsville	Indoor football	AF2, Arena Football League	2000–2010	Relocated to Duluth, Georgia
Mobile Bay Tarpons	Mobile	Indoor football	Southern Indoor Football League		
Mobile Seagulls	Mobile	Indoor football	Indoor Professional Football League, National Indoor Football League	2000–2001	Defunct
Mobile Wizards	Mobile	Indoor football	AF2	2002	Defunct
Montgomery Maulers/Bears	Montgomery	Indoor football	National Indoor Football League, American Indoor Football Association	2005–2007	Defunct
Birmingham Grasshoppers	Birmingham	Soccer	United States Interregional Soccer League, Premier Development League	1992–1996	Defunct
Mobile Revelers	Mobile	Soccer	United States Interregional Soccer League	1995–1997	Defunct
Pumas FC	Birmingham	Soccer	National Premier Soccer League	2009–2010	Defunct
Mobile Vipers	Mobile	Football	Extreme Southern	1988–1997	Defunct
Huntsville Stars	Huntsville	Baseball	Southern League	1985–2014	Relocated to Biloxi, Mississippi as the Biloxi Shuckers
