= Marlene Stollings =

American college basketball coach (born 1975)

Biographical details
- Born: January 7, 1975 (age 51); Beaver, Ohio, U.S.

Playing career
- 1993–1995: Ohio State
- 1996–1998: Ohio
- Position: Guard

Coaching career (HC unless noted)
- 2000–2001: Jacksonville (asst.)
- 2001–2002: New Mexico State (asst.)
- 2002–2003: New Mexico State (interim HC)
- 2003–2004: Wright State (asst.)
- 2005–2007: Saint Louis (asst.)
- 2007–2010: Ole Miss (asst.)
- 2010–2011: Ole Miss (associate HC)
- 2011–2012: Winthrop
- 2012–2014: VCU
- 2014–2018: Minnesota
- 2018–2020: Texas Tech

Head coaching record
- Overall: 165–117 (.585)
- Tournaments: 1–2 (NCAA); 1–2 (WNIT)

Accomplishments and honors

Championships
- Sun Belt West Division (2003)

Awards
- Big South Coach of the Year (2012)

Linda Marlene Stollings (born January 7, 1975) is an American college basketball coach who was most recently women's basketball head coach at Texas Tech University. Stollings played college basketball at Ohio State University and Ohio University. After serving as an assistant coach at various colleges from 2000 to 2011 and briefly as interim head coach at New Mexico State in 2003, Stollings was head coach at Winthrop from 2011 to 2012, VCU from 2012 to 2014, Minnesota from 2014 to 2018, and Texas Tech from 2018 to 2020.

Stollings led Winthrop to a winning record in her single season at the school and VCU to the 2014 WNIT. Additionally, Stollings twice took Minnesota to the NCAA Tournament, in 2015 and 2018.

In two seasons at Texas Tech, Stollings inherited a losing program and achieved a winning record in her second season of 2019–20. However, months after that season, Stollings was fired following a USA Today story that revealed allegations of abusive treatment of players.

== Early life and playing career ==
Stollings grew up in Beaver, Ohio, where she attended Eastern High School. As of 2017, her career point total of 3,514 is the high school basketball career scoring record in Ohio, ahead of LeBron James's 2,657. As a senior in 1992–93, Stollings was a Kodak All-American.

From 1993 to 1995, Stollings played college basketball at Ohio State University under head coach Nancy Darsch. At guard, Stollings averaged 6.0 points and 1.1 rebounds in her first season in 1993–94. The following season in 1994–95, Stollings averaged 5.4 points and 1.2 rebounds.

In 1995, Stollings transferred to Ohio University, where she played for the Ohio Bobcats from 1996 to 1998 under head coach Marsha Reall. In her debut season with Ohio in 1996–97, Stollings averaged 10.1 points and 3.1 rebounds. As a senior on the 1997–98 team, which went 17–11 (13–5 Mid-American Conference), Stollings was Ohio's leading scorer with 22.9 points per game, in addition to 4.8 rebounds and 4.2 assists. Stollings was a Kodak honorable mention All-American in 1998 and graduated from Ohio University that year as a double major with a B.B.A. in marketing and B.S. in sport industry.

After graduating from college, Stollings played professional basketball for two years, first for Club ABB Baden in Switzerland in 1998–99. Then in 1999, Stollings was invited to the training camp of the WNBA team Utah Starzz. In 2001, Stollings played for the Mobile Majesty of the National Women's Basketball League.

== Coaching career ==
=== Assistant coach (2000–2011) ===
Stollings began her college coaching career as an assistant coach at Jacksonville University in the 2000–01 season. In 2001, Stollings began the first of two seasons as an assistant coach at New Mexico State under Nikita Lowry Dawkins, who was then named Nikita Lowry. Early in 2003, New Mexico State fired Lowry following an internal investigation that found that Lowry was physically and verbally abusive towards players. From December 20, 2002, until resigning on February 5, 2003, Stollings was interim head coach, during which she went 9–3. Eventually, New Mexico State won the Sun Belt Conference West Division title.

On July 9, 2003, Wright State University hired Stollings as an assistant coach for the Wright State Raiders women's basketball program on the staff of head coach Bridgett Williams. Stollings coached for one season at Wright State.

From 2005 to 2007, Stollings was an assistant coach at Saint Louis University under Shimmy Gray-Miller. Stollings was then an assistant coach under Renee Ladner at Ole Miss from 2007 to 2011 and was associate head coach in the 2010–11 season. Stollings helped sign a highly ranked 2009 recruiting class that included Mississippi Gatorade Player of the Year Valencia McFarland.

=== Winthrop (2011–2012) ===
In the 2011–12 season, Stollings had her first head coaching job at Winthrop, where Winthrop went 18–13, only the program's second winning season in 26 years and the most total wins by any first-year Winthrop head coach. As a result, Stollings won Big South Conference Coach of the Year honors in women's basketball.

=== VCU (2012–2014) ===
From 2012 to 2014, Stollings was head coach at VCU. After an 11–19 debut season in 2012–13, Stollings doubled the win total in 2013–14 to 22–10 with an appearance in the 2014 Women's National Invitation Tournament for the sixth 20-win season in program history.

=== Minnesota (2014–2018) ===
The University of Minnesota hired Stollings to be Minnesota Golden Gophers women's basketball head coach on April 7, 2014. Minnesota went 23–10 (11–7 Big Ten) in Stollings's first season and made the NCAA tournament for the first time since 2009. The 2014–15 team featured two 2015 WNBA draft picks in Big Ten Player of the Year Amanda Zahui B. (second overall) and Shae Kelley (35th).

In 2015–16, Minnesota went 20–12 (11–7 Big Ten) and qualified for the second round of the WNIT. Minnesota dropped to 15–16 in 2016–17, during which Stollings reached her 100th career coaching win, but improved to 24–9 (11–5 Big Ten) with a second round NCAA tournament appearance in 2017–18. Stollings finished 82–47 in four seasons at Minnesota.

=== Texas Tech (2018–2020) ===
Texas Tech University hired Stollings as Texas Tech Lady Raiders basketball head coach on April 9, 2018. Inheriting a team that went 7–23, Stollings led Texas Tech to a 14–17 record in 2018–19. Following an 11–0 start, Texas Tech went 18–11 (7–11 Big 12) record in 2019–20, a season that had the Big 12 Tournament and postseason play canceled due to the COVID-19 pandemic.

USA Today revealed in a story published on August 5, 2020, that 12 players left Texas Tech since Stollings became head coach in 2018 over accusations that Stollings and her staff were verbally abusive and subject players to dangerous forms of conditioning, for instance a requirement for players to have a 90 percent heart rate in practice and games. The day after that story was published, Texas Tech fired Stollings for cause. Texas Tech athletic director Kirby Hocutt verbally heard findings on June 29 from an internal investigation into Stollings but took over a month to take disciplinary action, for which Hocutt said on August 7: "Have we let these girls down? We have," and "While we were aware of the concerns the young women brought forward after the first season, we were not aware of the magnitude to which they had occurred or to the magnitude to which it’d affected the young women in our locker room."

== Head coaching record ==
Record table
Season	Team	Overall	Conference	Standing	Postseason
New Mexico State Aggies (Sun Belt Conference) (2002–2003)
2002–03	New Mexico State	9–3	6–2	(resigned)	
New Mexico State:		9–3 (.750)	6–2 (.750)		
Winthrop Eagles (Big South Conference) (2011–2012)
2011–12	Winthrop	18–13	12–6	3rd	
Winthrop:		18–13 (.581)	12–6 (.667)		
Virginia Commonwealth Rams (Atlantic 10 Conference) (2012–2014)
2012–13	VCU	11–19	4–10	12th	
2013–14	VCU	22–10	9–7	8th	WNIT first round
VCU:		33–29 (.532)	13–17 (.433)		
Minnesota Golden Gophers (Big Ten Conference) (2014–2018)
2014–15	Minnesota	23–10	11–7	6th	NCAA first round
2015–16	Minnesota	20–12	11–7	5th	WNIT second round
2016–17	Minnesota	15–16	5–11	10th	
2017–18	Minnesota	24–9	11–5	T–3rd	NCAA second round
Minnesota:		82–47 (.636)	38–30 (.559)		
Texas Tech Red Raiders (Big 12 Conference) (2018–2020)
2018–19	Texas Tech	14–17	4–14	T–8th	
2019–20	Texas Tech	18–11	7–11	6th	
Texas Tech:		32–28 (.533)	11–25 (.306)		
Total:		164–117 (.584)			
