= Lindsey Yamasaki =

American basketball player (born 1980)

Personal information
- Born: June 2, 1980 (age 46) Oregon City, Oregon, U.S.
- Listed height: 6 ft 1 in (1.85 m)
- Listed weight: 180 lb (82 kg)

Career information
- High school: Oregon City (Oregon City, Oregon)
- College: Stanford (1998–2002)
- WNBA draft: 2002: 2nd round, 29th overall pick
- Drafted by: Miami Sol
- Playing career: 2002–2006
- Position: Forward

Career history
- 2002: Miami Sol
- 2003: New York Liberty
- 2003: Botas Spor
- 2004: Chicago Blaze
- 2004: Ceyhan Belediyespor
- 2005–2006: San Jose Spiders

Career highlights
- All Pac-10 (2002)
- Stats at Basketball Reference
Medals
Women's basketball
Representing United States
World University Games
Gold medal – first place	2001 Beijing	Team competition

Lindsey Brooke Yamasaki (born June 2, 1980) is an American former professional women's basketball player.

== Life and career ==
Yamasaki was born in Oregon City, Oregon, to Syd and Kriss Yamasaki. She has a sister named Britt, and a brother named Kobi. Lindsey attended Oregon City High School, where she led the women's basketball team to four Oregon state championships and finished #1 in the USA Today national rankings for three years. She was one of the most sought-after recruits for college basketball when she graduated in 1998 and was named the most highly recruited female athlete of 1998. Yamasaki was named a WBCA All-American. She participated in the WBCA High School All-America Game, where she scored sixteen points, and earned MVP honors.

On full scholarship at Stanford University, Yamasaki led the team to the Pac-10 regular season championship in her senior season, 2001–2002. Her Stanford women's basketball teams made the NCAA Division I Women's Basketball tournaments every year, but never won more than two games in the tournament. Yamasaki's 4-year statistics at Stanford were 13.9 points per game, 44.3% field goal percentage, 38.9% 3-point field goal percentage.

During the 2002 WNBA draft, the 6-foot-2-inch Yamasaki was the 13th pick in the 2nd round (29th overall) to the now-defunct Miami Sol, averaging 3.5 points per game in 15 games in 2002. In 2003, she played 24 games for the New York Liberty averaging 0.7 points. She also played in the National Women's Basketball League for the San Jose Spiders, in the Turkish Women's Basketbol League for Ceyhan Belediyespor and Botas Spor, as well as for the San Antonio Silver Stars where she tore her right Achilles in June 2005. In 2006, she trained with the Seattle Storm in pre-season and was released by the team in May 2006, after which she decided to retire.

In 2008, Yamasaki was named as the first head coach of the first ever women's basketball team at the Academy of Art University in San Francisco.

== Career statistics ==
Legend
GP	Games played	GS	Games started	MPG	Minutes per game	RPG	Rebounds per game
APG	Assists per game	SPG	Steals per game	BPG	Blocks per game	PPG	Points per game
TO	Turnovers per game	FG%	Field-goal percentage	3P%	3-point field-goal percentage	FT%	Free-throw percentage
**Bold**	Career best	°	League leader

=== WNBA ===
WNBA regular season statistics
Year	Team	GP	GS	MPG	FG%	3P%	FT%	RPG	APG	SPG	BPG	TO	PPG
2002	Miami	15	0	**9.8**	**44.2**	**52.9**	**50.0**	**1.0**	**0.6**	**0.3**	**0.1**	0.7	**3.5**
2003	New York	**24**	**1**	6.2	22.2	28.6	—	0.5	0.4	0.2	0.0	**0.2**	0.7
**Career**	2 year, 2 teams	39	1	7.6	35.7	41.9	50.0	0.7	0.5	0.2	0.0	0.4	1.7

=== College ===
NCAA statistics
Year	Team	GP	Points	FG%	3P%	FT%	RPG	APG	SPG	BPG	PPG
1998–99	Stanford	30	420	39.6	38.9	72.1	**5.9**	**2.6**	**1.0**	**0.4**	14.0
1999–00	Stanford	23	153	45.7	31.8	76.7	3.1	0.9	0.3	0.3	6.7
2000–01	Stanford	30	373	43.7	**42.5**	**82.2**	4.4	2.3	0.9	0.3	12.4
2001–02	Stanford	**32**	**551**	**48.4**	38.3	71.6	4.8	**2.6**	0.8	0.3	**17.2**
**Career**		85	1124	44.3	38.9	75.5	4.7	2.1	0.7	0.3	13.2

== USA Basketball ==
Yamasaki was selected to be a member of the team representing the USA at the 2001 World University Games held in Beijing, China. After winning the opening game easily, the USA team faced Canada and lost a close game 68–67. The USA team defeated Japan to earn a spot in the quarterfinals. The USA team fell behind by 12 points against undefeated Russia, but came back to win the game by eleven points. The next game was against the unbeaten host team China, and the USA team won 89–78. The USA team won their next two games to set up the gold medal game; a rematch against the host team. China would stay close early, but the USA team prevailed and won the gold medal with a score of 87–67. Yamasaki averaged 6.9 points per game.
