= San Diego Siege =

2005–2006 women's basketball team

- Sport: Basketball
- Founded: 2005
- Folded: 2006
- League: National Women's Basketball League
- Based in: San Diego, California
- Arena: Harry West Gymnasium
- Colors: red, white and blue
- Owner: Patrick Alexander
- Head coach: Fred Williams
- General manager: David McElwee

The San Diego Siege were a women's professional basketball team based in San Diego, California, that competed in the now defunct National Women's Basketball League (NWBL). The team played only one season, during February and March 2006, finishing the regular season 14-4 and earning the number one playoff seed. They defeated the San Francisco Legacy in the semi-final and lost to the Colorado Chill in the NWBL Championship for a 15-5 record.

== 2006 highlights ==
- NWBL Most Improved Player: Tera Bjorklund (6'5"-F-82, college: Colorado)
- NWBL Rookie of the Year: Cathrine Kraayeveld (6'4"-F-81, college: Oregon)
- NWBL Coach of the Year: Fred Williams
- NWBL All-Star: Tera Bjoklund, Jessica Cheeks, Cathrine Kraayeveld, Tynesha Lewis and Loree Moore

== 2006 roster ==
San Diego Siege roster
Players
Coaches

Pos.	No.	Nat.	Name	Ht.	Wt.	Age
G	1	(United States)	Nakase, Natalie	5 ft 2 in (1.57 m)		46 – 18 April 1980
G	2	(United States)	Young, Courtney	5 ft 11 in (1.80 m)		43 – 7 May 1983
G	7	(United States)	Lewis, Tynesha	5 ft 10 in (1.78 m)		47 – 8 May 1979
F	10	(United States)	Harris, Crystal	6 ft 0 in (1.83 m)		43 – 14 October 1982
F/C	11	(United States)	Edobor-Osula, Osato	6 ft 5 in (1.96 m)		44 – 15 October 1981
G	12	(United States)	Cheeks, Jessica	5 ft 9 in (1.75 m)		44 – 1 August 1981
G	14	(United States)	Price, Latrice	5 ft 6 in (1.68 m)		52 – 1 January 1974
G	21	(United States)	Moore, Loree	5 ft 9 in (1.75 m)		43 – 21 March 1983
G	22	(United States)	Scharlow, Abby	5 ft 8 in (1.73 m)		43 – 1 January 1983
G	23	(Dominican Republic)	Mercado, Jessica	5 ft 11 in (1.80 m)		42 – 22 September 1983
F	33	(United States)	Kraayeveld, Catherine	6 ft 4 in (1.93 m)		44 – 30 September 1981
C	50	(United States)	Bjorklund, Tera	6 ft 5 in (1.96 m)		43 – 29 June 1982

Head coach

- (United States) Fred Williams

Legend

- (C) Team captain
- Injured

- Roster

== Team Schedule ==
Date time, TV	Rank^{#}	Opponent^{#}	Result	Record	High points	High rebounds	High assists	Site city, state
Regular season
February 11, 2006; 7:00 p.m.		at San Francisco	W 91–84	1–0	19 – Cheeks	10 – Kraayeveld	4 – Lewis	San Francisco State University; San Francisco, CA
February 12, 2006; 4:00 p.m.		at San Jose	L 70–72	1–1	17 – Tied	9 – Bjorklund	5 – Cheeks	DeAnza College; Cupertino, CA
February 14, 2006; 7:00 p.m.		at Colorado	W 81–70	2–1	26 – Bjorklund	15 – Kraayeveld	5 – Tied	Budweiser Events Center (2,297); Loveland, CO
February 18, 2006; 7:00 p.m.		San Jose	W 89–80	3–1	21 – Lewis	11 – Kraayeveld	3 – Tied	Harry West Gymnasium; San Diego, CA
February 21, 2006; 7:00 p.m.		at Colorado	W 79–70	4–1	20 – Cheeks	6 – Bjorklund	5 – Cheeks	Budweiser Events Center (1,329); Loevland, CO
February 25, 2006; 7:00 p.m.		San Francisco	W 87–74	5–1	28 – Kraayeveld	9 – Tied	8 – Lewis	Harry West Gymnasium; San Diego, CA
February 26, 2006; 4:00 p.m.		Colorado	W 76–73	6–1	16 – Bjorklund	11 – Lewis	6 – Moore	Harry West Gymnasium; San Diego, CA
February 28, 2006; 7:00 p.m.		San Jose	W 99–95	7–1	33 – Kraayeveld	7 – Bjorklund	4 – Scharlow	Harry West Gymnasium; San Diego, CA
March 3, 2006; 7:00 p.m.		at San Francisco	W 85–54	8–1	19 – Kraayeveld	8 – Kraayeveld	6 – Moore	San Francisco State University; San Francisco, CA
March 4, 2006; 4:00 p.m.		at San Jose	W 69–67	9–1	13 – Tied	14 – Kraayeveld	4 – Lewis	DeAnza College; Cupertino, CA
March 7, 2006; 7:00 p.m.		San Jose	W 101–72	10–1	26 – Kraayeveld	13 – Kraayeveld	7 – Kraayeveld	Harry West Gymnasium; San Diego, CA
March 11, 2006; 7:00 p.m.		San Francisco	W 84–55	11–1	24 – Kraayeveld	9 – Tied	6 – Tied	Harry West Gymnasium; San Diego, CA
March 12, 2006; 4:00 p.m.		Colorado	L 80–86	11–2	24 – Bjorklund	9 – Kraayeveld	4 – Lewis	Harry West Gymnasium; San Diego, CA
March 17, 2006; 4:00 p.m.		at San Jose	W 70–69	12–2	19 – Tied	13 – Moore	3 – Tied	DeAnza College; Cupertino, CA
March 19, 2006; 4:00 p.m.		at San Francisco	W 83–76	13–2	26 – Bjorklund	6 – Bjorklund	2 – Tied	Ira Jenkins Center; Oakland, CA
March 21, 2006; 7:00 p.m.		Colorado	L 71–79	13–3	27 – Lewis	7 – Tied	4 – Moore	Harry West Gymnasium; San Diego, CA
March 25, 2006; 7:00 p.m.		San Francisco	W 81–62	14–3	18 – Tied	12 – Kraayeveld	6 – Nakase	Harry West Gymnasium; San Diego, CA
March 26, 2006; 3:00 p.m.		at Colorado	L 91–96	14–4	20 – Cheeks	9 – Moore	5 – Moore	Budweiser Events Center (1,851); Loveland, CO
NWBL Playoffs
March 30, 2006; 5:00 p.m.	No. 1	vs. No. 4 San Francisco; Semi-final game	W 75–63	15–4	26 – Bjorklund	8 – Bjorklund	– N/A	Budweiser Events Center; Loveland, CO
March 31, 2006; 7:30 p.m.	No. 1	vs. No. 2 Colorado; Championship game	L 71–78	15–5	20 – Bjorklund	11 – Bjorklund	– N/A	Budweiser Events Center (est. 2,000); Loveland, CO
*Non-conference game. ^{#}Rankings from AP Poll. (#) Tournament seedings in parentheses. All times are in Pacific Time.
