= Julie McBride =

American-Polish basketball player

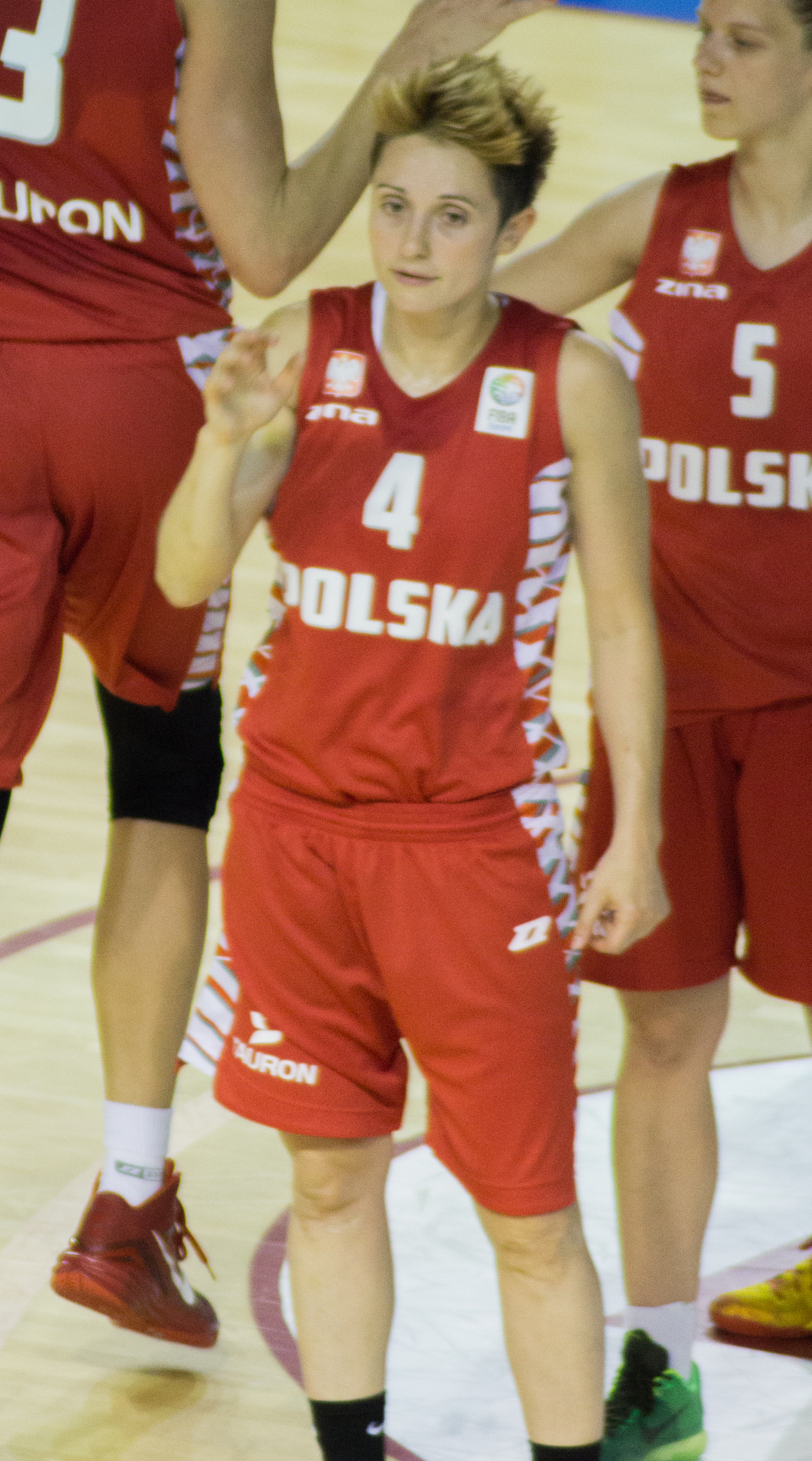

Albany Patroons
- Position: Assistant coach

Personal information
- Born: September 24, 1982 (age 44) Troy, New York, U.S.
- Listed height: 5 ft 4 in (1.63 m)
- Listed weight: 130 lb (59 kg)

Career information
- High school: Catholic Central (Troy, New York)
- College: Syracuse (2000–2004)
- WNBA draft: 2004: undrafted
- Playing career: 2005–2021
- Coaching career: 2021–present

Career history

Playing
- 2004–2005: Botaş
- 2005–2006: San Jose Spiders
- 2006: Chicago Sky
- 2006–2007: Ceyhan Belediyespor
- 2008–2009: Samsun Basketbol
- 2009–2010: Panküp TED Kayseri
- 2010–2011: Ceyhan Belediyespor
- 2011–2012: Gospić Osiguranje
- 2012–2013: Artego Bydgoszcz
- 2013–2014: Beşiktaş JK
- 2014–2016: Artego Bydgoszcz
- 2016: Energa Toruń
- 2017–2019: Artego Bydgoszcz
- 2020–2021: KS Basket 25 Bydgoszcz

Coaching
- 2021 – present: Albany Patroons (asst.)

Julie Anne McBride (born September 24, 1982) is an American-Polish professional basketball coach.

== College ==
McBride graduated from Syracuse as the school’s all-time leader in points (1,605), scoring average (14.2 ppg), field goal attempts (1,378), 3-pointers (229), 3-point field goal attempts (707), free throws (348), assists (574), assists average (5.1 apg) and minutes played (3,964). She was a three-time All-Big East selection.

== Syracuse statistics ==
Legend
GP	Games played	GS	Games started	MPG	Minutes per game
FG%	Field goal percentage	3P%	3-point field goal percentage	FT%	Free throw percentage
RPG	Rebounds per game	APG	Assists per game	SPG	Steals per game
BPG	Blocks per game	PPG	Points per game	**Bold**	Career high

Year	Team	GP	Points	FG%	3P%	FT%	RPG	APG	SPG	BPG	PPG
2000–01	Syracuse	27	265	35.7	33.3	**79.2**	2.1	4.0	1.1	–	9.8
2001–02	Syracuse	**31**	**461**	**38.8**	32.6	79.0	2.3	5.6	2.0	–	14.9
2002–03	Syracuse	28	438	36.9	**35.7**	73.8	3.0	**6.4**	**2.2**	**0.1**	15.6
2003–04	Syracuse	27	441	37.0	27.9	76.8	**4.1**	4.2	1.8	0.0	**16.3**
Career	Syracuse	113	1605	37.3	32.4	77.0	2.9	5.1	1.8	0.0	14.2

== Professional career ==
McBride played for a number of domestic and international teams.

Following college, McBride played for the San Jose Spiders of the National Women's Basketball League in 2005 and 2006. She averaged 17.7 points per game in 2005 and 8.8 points in the 2006 season.

On May 3, 2006, McBride signed a contract with the Chicago Sky of the WNBA. She was waived on May 13.

Following her brief stint in the WNBA, McBride went overseas to play for Ceyhan's Spor Club, a pro team in the Turkish Women's Basketball League. In the 2006–07 season, McBride led her league in scoring (19.4 points per game) and assists (6.1). However, Ceyhan finished the season 1–7 after McBride suffered a season-ending injury, tearing her anterior cruciate ligament. Following the 2006–07 season, McBride signed a two-year extension.

Earlier she was a member of the Kayseri Pan Kup Basketball team after leading Samsun Basketbol Kulübü (SBK) in the Turkish Women's Basketball League to the 2nd place and leading her team in scoring (15.0) and assist (4.0).

== Coaching career ==
On December 7, 2021, Will Brown announced that Julie McBride would join his coaching staff for the 2022 season.

In 2022, McBride became a coach for Hoosac School, and was still in that position in 2024.
