= Bowling Green Falcons basketball =

Bowling Green Falcons basketball may refer to:

- Bowling Green Falcons men's basketball
- Bowling Green Falcons women's basketball
