= Brittany Jackson =

American basketball player (born 1983)

Personal information
- Born: July 28, 1983 (age 42) Cleveland, Tennessee, U.S.
- Listed height: 6 ft 0 in (1.83 m)
- Listed weight: 175 lb (79 kg)

Career information
- High school: Bradley Central (Cleveland, Tennessee)
- College: Tennessee (2001–2005)
- Position: Guard / Forward

Career highlights
- Class AAA Tennessee Miss Basketball (2001)

Brittany Elizabeth Jackson (born July 28, 1983, in Cleveland, Tennessee) is an American basketball player.

== High school ==
Jackson played for Bradley Central High School in Cleveland, Tennessee, where she was named a WBCA All-American. She participated in the 2001 WBCA High School All-America Game where she scored five points.

== College ==
She played collegiately at the University of Tennessee under Pat Summitt. Jackson is a 6-foot-0-inch (183 cm) guard who specializes in three point shooting. She played for the Tennessee Lady Volunteers from 2001 to 2005, helping her team reach the final four of the NCAA Women's Division I Basketball Championship all four seasons and the national championship game in 2003 and 2004.

== Tennessee statistics ==
Legend
GP	Games played	GS	Games started	MPG	Minutes per game
FG%	Field goal percentage	3P%	3-point field goal percentage	FT%	Free throw percentage
RPG	Rebounds per game	APG	Assists per game	SPG	Steals per game
BPG	Blocks per game	PPG	Points per game	**Bold**	Career high

Year	Team	GP	Points	FG%	3P%	FT%	RPG	APG	SPG	BPG	PPG
2001–02	Tennessee	32	207	39.2	**38.4**	74.5	**2.1**	1.0	0.6	0.1	6.5
2002–03	Tennessee	**35**	199	35.6	35.2	73.6	1.4	1.0	0.3	0.1	5.7
2003–04	Tennessee	32	**233**	**39.3**	35.6	**82.4**	1.9	**1.4**	0.6	**0.2**	7.3
2004–05	Tennessee	**35**	289	34.2	36.2	81.0	2.1	1.0	**0.8**	0.1	**8.3**
Career	Tennessee	134	928	36.8	36.3	77.7	1.9	1.1	0.6	0.1	6.9

== Professional ==
In 2006, she played for the San Jose Spiders of the National Women's Basketball League. She played for Turkish team Burhaniye Belediyespor after one season with the Spiders. In January 2008 she joined Polish team AZS KK Jelenia Góra and shortly afterward, signed a training camp contract with Atlanta, having failed to make the WNBA in her first three post-college season. They waived her contract after 1 month. She also worked as a model.

(Family)She is married with 2 children.
