= San Jose Spiders =

San Jose Spiders may refer to:

- San Jose Spiders (NWBL), women's professional basketball team, 2005-2006
- San Jose Spiders (AUDL), former name of Oakland Spiders men's ultimate disc team, 2014-2021
