= Natalie Nakase =

American basketball player and coach (born 1980)

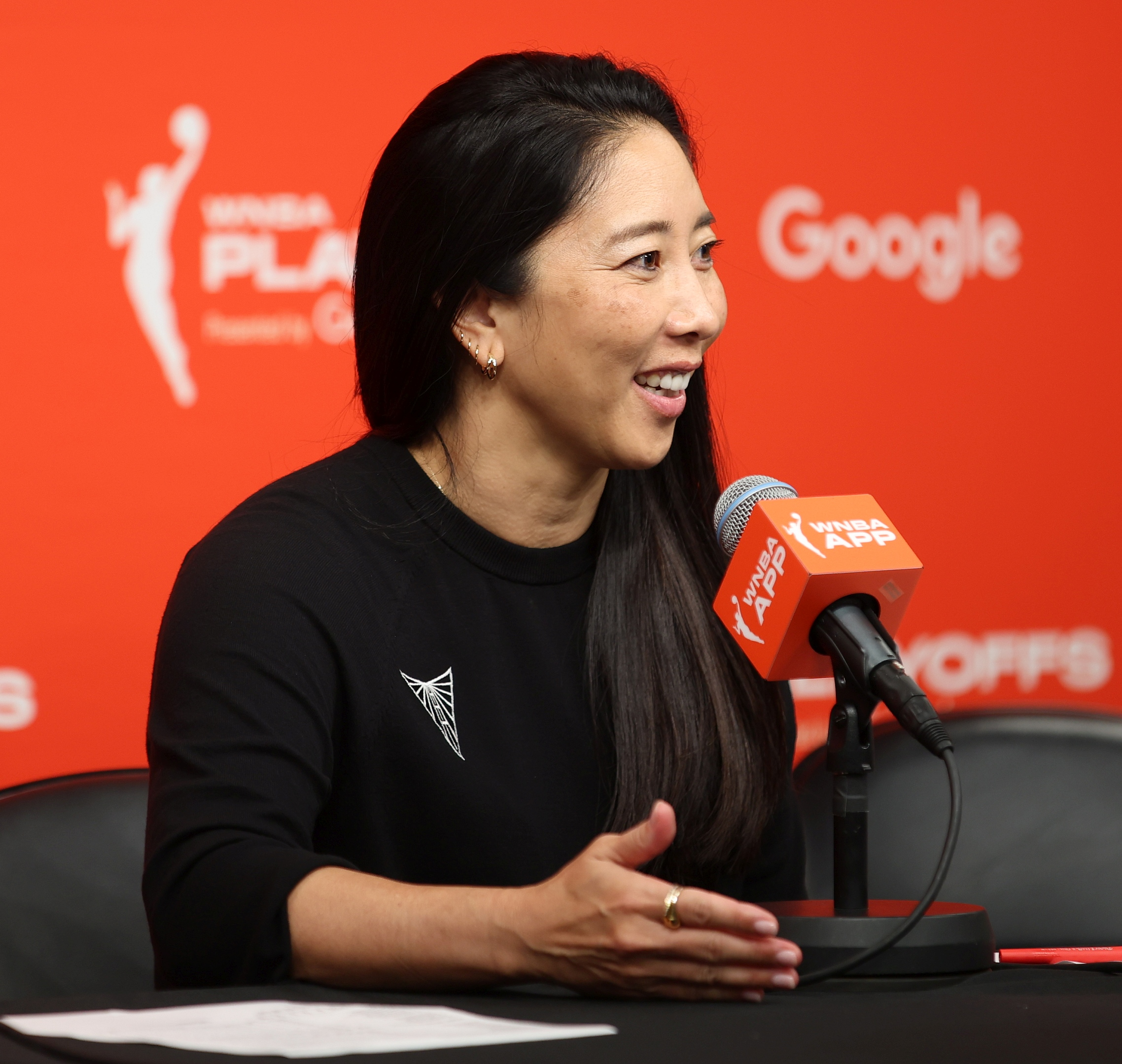
- Nakase with the Golden State Valkyries in 2025

Golden State Valkyries
- Title: Head coach
- League: WNBA

Personal information
- Born: April 18, 1980 (age 46) Anaheim, California, U.S.
- Listed height: 5 ft 2 in (1.57 m)

Career information
- High school: Marina (Huntington Beach, California)
- College: UCLA (1998–2003)
- Playing career: 2005–2008
- Position: Point guard
- Coaching career: 2008–present

Career history

Playing
- 2005: San Jose Spiders
- 2006: San Diego Siege
- 2007–2008: Herner TC

Coaching
- 2008–2010: Wolfenbüttel Wildcats
- 2010–2011: Tokyo Apache (assistant)
- 2011–2012: Saitama Broncos
- 2017–2018: Agua Caliente Clippers (assistant)
- 2018–2020: Los Angeles Clippers (assistant)
- 2021–2022: Agua Caliente Clippers (assistant)
- 2022–2024: Las Vegas Aces (assistant)
- 2025–present: Golden State Valkyries

Career highlights
- As head coach: WNBA champion (2026); WNBA Coach of the Year (2025); As assistant coach: 2× WNBA champion (2022, 2023); WNBA Commissioner's Cup champion (2022)
Medals
Women's basketball
Assistant coach for the United States
World Cup
Gold medal – first place	2026 Germany	Team competition

Natalie Mitsue Nakase (/nəˈkɑːseɪ/ nə-KAH-say; born April 18, 1980) is an American professional basketball coach and former player who is the head coach of the Golden State Valkyries of the Women's National Basketball Association (WNBA). After retiring as a player, she was a head coach for both men's and women's professional teams. Nakase was later an assistant coach for the Los Angeles Clippers in the National Basketball Association (NBA). She then won two WNBA championships as an assistant coach for the Las Vegas Aces in 2022 and 2023, and one as a head coach for the Golden State Valkyries in 2026. In 2025, she was named the WNBA Coach of the Year in her first season with the Valkyries.

Nakase grew up in Orange County, California, where she was honored as the county's high school player of the year. She played college basketball for the UCLA Bruins, receiving honorable mention as an all-conference player in the Pacific-10 in 2002. A third-generation Japanese American, she became the first Asian American to play in the National Women's Basketball League (NWBL). She also played in Germany before suffering a knee injury and retiring as a player.

Nakase went into coaching, and served as a head coach of a women's team in Germany before becoming the first female head coach in Japan's top pro men's league. Nakase returned to the United States, joining the Clippers of the NBA as a video intern in 2012. She became an assistant coach to their NBA G League development team, Agua Caliente, in 2017. She became an NBA assistant for the Clippers in 2018 and joined the WNBA's Aces in 2022, when she became the first Asian American coach to win a WNBA title.

Nakase was hired as the first head coach for the WNBA expansion franchise Golden State Valkyries in October 2024, making her the first Asian-American head coach in league history. She led the Valkyries to a WNBA championship in their second season of existence, becoming the fastest team in North American history to win a championship since 1967.

== Early life ==
Nakase was born in Anaheim, California, the youngest of three daughters to Gary and Debra Nakase. Her parents are both second-generation Japanese-Americans.

Nakase grew up in Huntington Beach, California, where she attended Marina High School and was a four-year letterman playing basketball. She led the school to two Sunset League titles. In 1998, the team won their first California Interscholastic Federation (CIF) Southern Section title. Nakase averaged 13.9 points and 8.6 assists that season, when she was named the 1998 Orange County Player of the Year by both the Los Angeles Times and the Orange County Register. She finished her career as the Sunset League leader in career assists, and set school records for career assists, steals and three-point field goals made.

== College career ==
Standing at 5 feet 2 inches (1.57 m), Nakase was not heavily recruited by college basketball programs. She turned down a full scholarship from the University of California, Irvine to attend her dream school, the University of California, Los Angeles (UCLA), where she was a walk-on for the UCLA Bruins. Nakase redshirted as a freshman after injuring her left knee in an August summer league game, which required reconstructive surgery to repair her anterior cruciate ligament (ACL). She recovered to become a three-year starter at point guard for UCLA, averaging 4.9 points and 3.7 assists per game in her career. In 2002, she earned honorable mention for the All-Pac-10 team after averaging a career-high 7.9 points and 5.1 assists per game.

== Professional career ==
Nakase played in the NWBL for two seasons, playing with the San Jose Spiders in 2005 and the San Diego Siege in 2006. She was the league's first Asian-American player. In 2007, she tried out with the Phoenix Mercury of the WNBA, but was waived. She coached an Amateur Athletic Union (AAU) team, and went to Germany to play one season with Herner TC in 2007–08, when she again tore knee ligaments.

== Coaching career ==
=== Wolfenbüttel Wildcats ===
Opting to retire as a player rather than undergoing surgery again, Nakase coached for the Wolfenbüttel Wildcats in the Damen-Basketball-Bundesliga for the 2008–09 and 2009–10 seasons. She next went to Japan in hopes of playing, but learned that the Japanese women's league didn't then allow foreign players.

=== Tokyo Apache ===
A friend of Nakase's, Darin Maki, was playing with the Tokyo Apache, and arranged with his coach, former NBA coach Bob Hill, to allow Nakase to observe practice before the 2010–11 season began. She then prepared a scouting report for the team's next opponent, which led to a volunteer assistant coaching position under Hill.

=== Saitama Broncos ===
After the Apache folded at the end of the season, Saitama Broncos head coach Dean Murray hired Nakase as an assistant at the urging of Hill. She took over the struggling team midseason after Murray stepped down, and became the first female head coach in the bj league, Japan's top professional men's league. However, her father persuaded her to not return to Japan in order to pursue her dream of becoming a coach in the NBA.

=== Los Angeles Clippers/Agua Caliente Clippers (2012-2022) ===
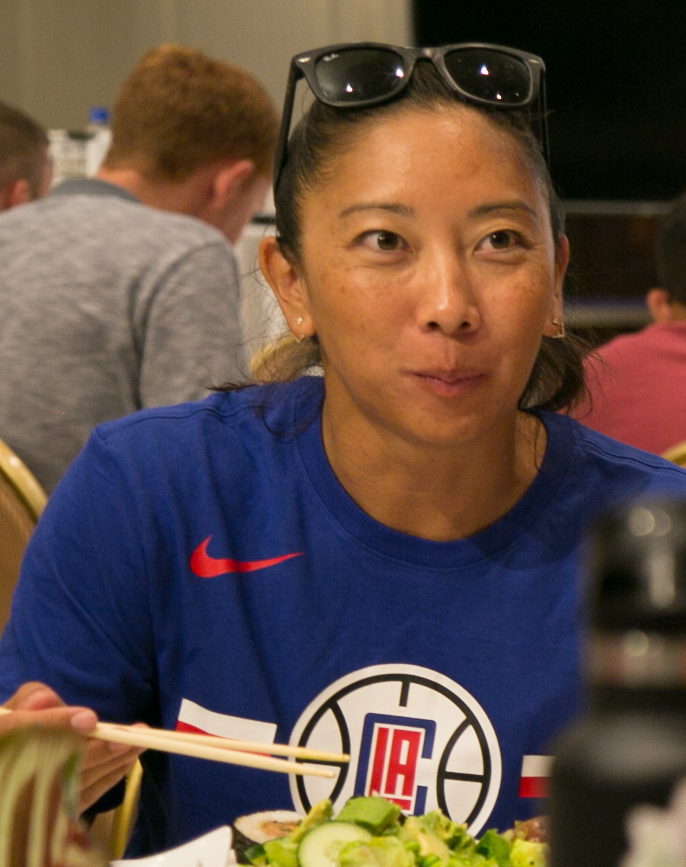
Nakase with the Los Angeles Clippers in 2018

In September 2012, Nakase began a yearlong internship in the NBA with the Los Angeles Clippers, working under the team's video coordinator. She became the team's assistant video coordinator. She was one of 15 women of Asian or Pacific Islander heritage honored at the White House in 2013 as their Champions of Change. During the two-week 2014 NBA Summer League in Las Vegas, Nakase was an assistant coach for the Clippers, becoming the first woman to sit on the bench as an NBA assistant. (Note: Lisa Boyer was an assistant for the Cleveland Cavaliers in 2001–02, but she neither sat on the bench nor traveled for away games, and she was paid by the Cleveland Rockers of the WNBA and not by the Cavaliers. Becky Hammon was hired by the San Antonio Spurs for the 2014–15 season, becoming the first woman to either be paid or work full-time as an NBA assistant.)

In 2017–18, Nakase was an assistant coach for the Clippers' NBA G League affiliate, Agua Caliente Clippers, under head coach Casey Hill—the son of her mentor, Bob Hill. In 2018–19, she was promoted to be a player development assistant coach for the L.A. Clippers, becoming one of the few female coaches in the NBA. In 2020–21, Tyronn Lue replaced the departed Doc Rivers as the Los Angeles coach, and Nakase became an assistant again for Agua Caliente under their new coach, Paul Hewitt. In 2022, she was a finalist for the head coach position of the WNBA's Phoenix Mercury.

=== Las Vegas Aces (2022-2024) ===
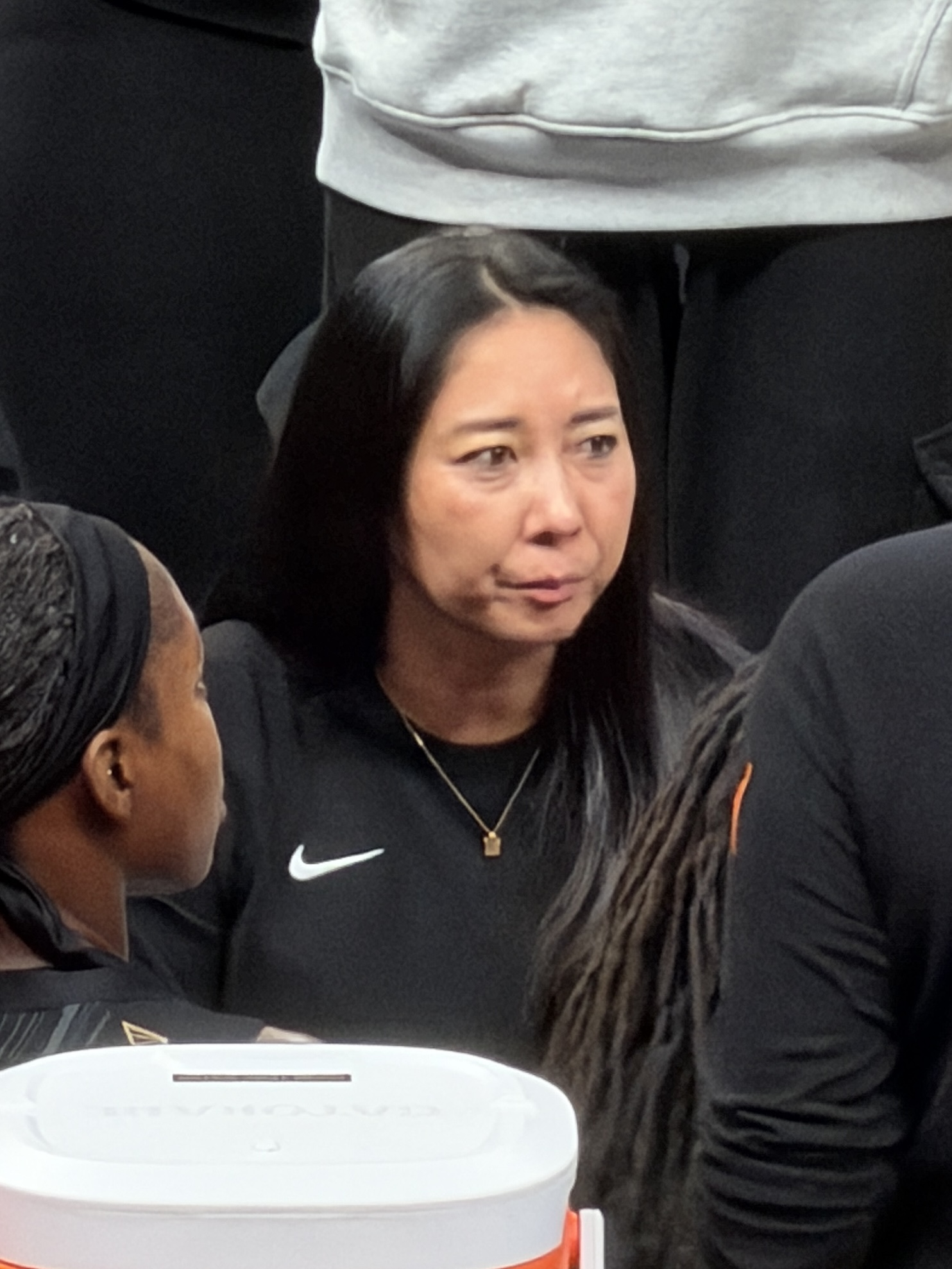
Nakase speaks to Valkyries players during a time out at a game against the Indiana Fever in Indianapolis, Indiana in 2026.

On February 25, 2022, Nakase joined the WNBA as an assistant to the Las Vegas Aces's new head coach, Becky Hammon. She and Hammon, who was a long-time San Antonio Spurs assistant coach, had been the NBA's two longest-tenured women coaches. On September 20, 2022, Nakase became the first Asian American coach to win a WNBA title.

=== Golden State Valkyries (2025–present) ===
On October 10, 2024, the expansion team Golden State Valkyries announced that they had hired Nakase as their first head coach, making her the first Asian American head coach in league history. On September 17, 2025, she was named the 2025 WNBA Coach of the Year, the first head coach of an expansion team to win the award in their first year. In 2026, the Valkyries won a WNBA championship against the Atlanta Dream in Game 7 of the WNBA Finals; this made Nakase the first Asian American head coach to win a WNBA championship.

== Head coaching record ==
=== B.League ===
Legend
Regular season	G	Games coached	W	Games won	L	Games lost	W–L %	Win–loss %
Playoffs	PG	Playoff games	PW	Playoff wins	PL	Playoff losses	PW–L %	Playoff win–loss %

Team	Year	G	W	L	W–L%	Finish	PG	PW	PL	PW–L%	Result
Saitama Broncos	2011–12	41	12	29	.293	10th in Eastern	-	-	-	–	-

=== WNBA ===
Team	Year	G	W	L	W–L%	Finish	PG	PW	PL	PW–L%	Result
GSV	2025	44	23	21	.523	5th in West	2	0	2	.000	Lost in 1st Round
GSV	2026	44	32	12	.727	2nd in West	13	9	4	.692	Won WNBA Finals
Career		88	55	33	.625		15	9	6	.600	

== Career statistics ==
Legend
GP	Games played	GS	Games started	MPG	Minutes per game	RPG	Rebounds per game
APG	Assists per game	SPG	Steals per game	BPG	Blocks per game	PPG	Points per game
TO	Turnovers per game	FG%	Field-goal percentage	3P%	3-point field-goal percentage	FT%	Free-throw percentage
**Bold**	Career best	°	League leader

=== College ===
Year	Team	GP	GS	MPG	FG%	3P%	FT%	RPG	APG	SPG	BPG	TO	PPG
1999–00	UCLA	11	-	-	**66.7**	0.0	71.4	0.5	0.1	0.4	0.0	-	0.8
2000–01	UCLA	**29**	-	-	36.8	24.0	50.0	1.9	4.4	**2.2**	0.0	-	4.4
2001–02	UCLA	**29**	-	-	36.2	33.9	78.3	**3.1**	**5.1**	1.7	0.0	-	**7.9**
2002–03	UCLA	**29**	-	22.7	33.0	**39.0**	**82.1**	1.6	2.8	1.1	0.0	1.6	4.2
**Career**		98	-	22.7	35.8	33.6	69.8	2.0	3.7	1.5	0.0	1.6	5.0
Statistics retrieved from Sports-Reference.

== See also ==
- List of coaches of Asian heritage in sports leagues in the United States and Canada
- List of female NBA coaches
- List of Japanese Americans
