= Fred Chmiel =

American basketball player and coach

Current position
- Title: Head coach
- Team: Bowling Green
- Conference: MAC
- Record: 51–42 (.548)†

Biographical details
- Education: Excelsior College

Coaching career (HC unless noted)
- 1994–1995: Feather River College (men's asst.)
- 1995–1999: Feather River College (men's HC)
- 1999–2005: Lassen College (men's HC)
- 2005: Charlotte Sting (asst.)
- 2006: San Jose Spiders
- 2006–2008: Temple (asst.)
- 2008–2010: San Diego State (asst.)
- 2010–2014: Penn State (asst.)
- 2014–2015: Minnesota (asst.)
- 2015–2023: South Carolina (asst.)
- 2023–present: Bowling Green

Head coaching record
- Overall: 51–42 (.548)†

Fredrick Joe Chmiel is an American women's basketball coach. He is currently the women's basketball head coach at the Bowling Green State University. He previously served as the head coach at Feather River College, Lassen College and the San Jose Spiders of the NWBL. He also was an assistant coach in the WNBA and at several NCAA Division I universities including the University of South Carolina where he was part of two national championship teams.

== Early life and education ==
Chmiel played basketball at Feather River College in California where he was All-Golden Valley Conference first-team. He also attended the University of Alaska-Fairbanks. He earned a bachelor's degree in liberal studies from Excelsior College and a master's degree in athletics administration from Concordia University.

== Coaching career ==
Chmiel began is coaching career as an assistant coach of the women's basketball team at Feather River College in 1994 and took over as the head coach the following year where he stayed for four seasons. In 1999 he took over as the head coach at Lassen College where he won three Golden Valley Conference championships.

In 2005 he was an assistant with the Charlotte Sting of the WNBA where he coached future Hall of Famer Dawn Staley. He was also a WNBA scout with the Indiana Fever and Detroit Shock. In 2006 he was the head coach of the NWBL's San Jose Spiders.

He accepted his first Division I assistant coach position under Dawn Staley from 2006 through 2008 when she was the head coach at Temple. He held an assistant coach position for two seasons at San Diego State, four seasons at Penn State, and one season at Minnesota before reuniting with Staley as one of her assistants at South Carolina in 2015. During his eight years with the Gamecocks they won two national titles and advanced to the final four in each of his final three seasons. He helped coach A'ja Wilson and Aliyah Boston to National Player of the Year awards.

=== Bowling Green ===
On April 8, 2023, he was named as the 10th head coach women's basketball head coach at Bowling Green.

== Head coaching record ==
=== NWBL ===
Team	Year	G	W	L	W–L%	Finish	PG	PW	PL	PW–L%	Result
San Jose Spiders	2006	18	8	10	.444	3rd	2	1	1	.500	Won third place game

=== College ===
Record table
Season	Team	Overall	Conference	Standing	Postseason
Bowling Green (Mid-American Conference) (2023–present)
2023–24	Bowling Green	16–15	10–8	T–4th	WNIT First Round
2024–25	Bowling Green	18–13	11–7	T–5th	
2025–26	Bowling Green	17–14	9–9	T-6th	
Bowling Green:		51–42 (.548)	30–24 (.556)		
Total:		51–42 (.548)†			
National champion Postseason invitational champion Conference regular season champion Conference regular season and conference tournament champion Division regular season champion Division regular season and conference tournament champion Conference tournament champion

†Coaching record does not include his collegiate men's basketball coaching record at Feather River College and Lassen College because it is unknown to the author.

== Personal life ==
He and his wife, Julie, have two daughters named Skylar and Ivy.
