= Bowling Green State Falcons basketball =

Bowling Green State Falcons basketball may refer to either of the basketball teams that represent the Bowling Green State University:

- Bowling Green Falcons men's basketball
- Bowling Green Falcons women's basketball
