= DeWayne Odom =

American football player (born 1968)

No. 36
- Position: Linebacker

Personal information
- Born: August 10, 1968 (age 58); Oceanside, California U.S.
- Listed height: 6 ft 3 in (1.91 m)
- Listed weight: 235 lb (107 kg)

Career information
- High school: Mira Mesa (San Diego, California)
- College: California (1987–1990)
- NFL draft: 1991: undrafted

Career history
- San Diego Chargers (1991)*; Edmonton Eskimos (1991–1992); Hamilton Tiger-Cats (1993)*
- * Offseason or practice squad member only

Albert DeWayne Odom (born August 10, 1968) is an American former football linebacker. He played college football at the University of California, Berkeley and professionally for the Edmonton Eskimos of the Canadian Football League (CFL).

== Early life and college ==
Albert DeWayne Odom was born on August 10, 1968, in Oceanside, California. He played high school football at Mira Mesa Senior High School in San Diego, California as a quarterback. He was named the City Eastern League Offensive Player of the Year in 1985. Odom also lettered three years in basketball.

Odom played college football for the California Golden Bears of the University of California, Berkeley as a linebacker, and was a four-year letterman from 1987 to 1990. He was redshirted in 1986. Odom became a starter during the eighth game of his freshman year in 1987. He recorded 41 solo tackles, 37 assisted tackles, and one interception in 1989, earning honorable mention All-Pac-10 honors. In Odom's senior year of 1990, the Golden Bears won their first bowl game in 53 years (the 1990 Copper Bowl).

== Professional career ==
After going undrafted in the 1991 NFL draft, Odom signed with the San Diego Chargers on April 25, 1991. On August 23, 1991, it was reported that Odom had been released by the Chargers so the team could make room for Cedric Mack.

In September 1991, Odom was signed to a trial by the Edmonton Eskimos of the Canadian Football League (CFL). He spent the 1991 season on the practice roster. After the retirement of middle linebacker Danny Bass in 1992, outside linebacker Larry Wruck was moved to middle linebacker. Odom then took Wruck's spot as the starting outside linebacker. Odom dressed in all 18 games for the Eskimos during the 1992 season, recording 44 defensive tackles, ten special teams tackles, three sacks, and two interceptions.

On March 7, 1993, Odom, Mike O'Shea, Dechane Cameron, William Freeney, and a first-round draft pick were traded to the Hamilton Tiger-Cats for Damon Allen. The trade was announced immediately after the Eskimos selected O'Shea in the 1993 CFL draft. Odom was released by the Tiger-Cats in late June 1993.

== Personal life ==
Odom's wife, Trisha Stafford-Odom, played in the WNBA. He traveled to WNBA games to watch her play. He later worked as an assistant manager of products, sales, and training at Honda. Odom has also volunteered for the Honda Campus All-Star Challenge, which is a quiz bowl for students at Historically black colleges and universities.
