= Atlanta Justice =

- Sport: Basketball
- Founded: 2001
- Folded: 2002
- League: National Women's Basketball League
- Based in: Atlanta, Georgia
- Championships: 1 (2001)

The Atlanta Justice were one of the original franchises of the National Women's Basketball League (NWBL). Based in Atlanta, Georgia, they played from 2001 to 2002. The Justice won the inaugural NWBL championship in 2001.
