= Houston Stealth =

- Sport: Basketball
- Founded: 2002
- Folded: 2004
- League: National Women's Basketball League
- Based in: Houston, Texas
- Championships: 2 (2002, 2003)

The Houston Stealth were a women's professional basketball team in the National Women's Basketball League (NWBL). Based in Houston, Texas, they played from 2002 to 2004. They won the NWBL championship in two of their three years of existence.
