= Fontaine Bros. =

American construction management and general contracting firm

Fontaine Bros., Inc.
- Type: Private
- Industry: Construction
- Founded: 1933; 93 years ago in Chicopee, Massachusetts, U.S.
- Founders: Eudore Fontaine; George Fontaine
- Headquarters: Springfield, Massachusetts, U.S.
- Key people: David P. Fontaine Jr. (CEO)
- Services: Construction management, general contracting
- Website: fontainebros.com

Fontaine Bros., Inc. is an American construction management and general contracting firm headquartered in Springfield, Massachusetts. The company was founded in 1933 in Chicopee by Eudore and George Fontaine, brothers who had emigrated from Canada and worked as carpenters in the Springfield area. It has remained under Fontaine family ownership into its fourth generation.

The company initially built houses before expanding into heavy construction during the 1940s and 1950s. Public school construction became a major part of its business during the postwar period and has continued to account for a substantial part of its business. The company has also undertaken higher education, municipal, healthcare, and housing projects in Massachusetts and in New England.

== History ==
Fontaine Bros. was founded in 1933 in Chicopee, Massachusetts, by brothers Eudore and George Fontaine, Canadian immigrants who had worked as carpenters in the Springfield area during the Great Depression.

The company initially concentrated on residential construction and later moved its operations to Springfield. George O. Fontaine Sr., who was born in Granby, Quebec, on November 29, 1894, settled in Chicopee and remained associated with the company until his death in September 1969 at the age of 74. By that time, the company was constructing schools, public housing, and other large buildings in the region.

During the 1940s and 1950s, the founders' sons, Raymond Fontaine and George Fontaine Jr., shifted the company's focus from residential building toward heavy construction. The business has remained in Fontaine family ownership through four generations.

Fontaine Bros. became involved in school construction during the postwar baby boom of the 1950s and 1960s. In 1959, it received contracts for Longmeadow Junior High School, Shea's Elementary School in Agawam, East Street School in Ludlow, and Blunt Park School in Springfield. By 1993, the company had constructed approximately 50 schools since the late 1950s, including Chicopee Comprehensive High School, Holyoke High School, and Dean Vocational High School in Holyoke. By 2016, it had managed more than 100 public and private school projects in the state.

The company also undertook projects for colleges and universities in the region. These included the Fine Arts Center at the University of Massachusetts Amherst, International Hall at Springfield College, and the Scibelli Biological Sciences Building at Springfield Technical Community College. In 1970, Fontaine Bros. was awarded the contract to construct the University of Massachusetts Medical School in Worcester, reported at the time as the largest single construction contract in Massachusetts history.

The company continued to be identified as Fontaine Bros., Inc. of Chicopee Falls as late as 1962, when it submitted the apparent low bid to construct St. Catherine of Siena Church in Springfield for the Roman Catholic Diocese of Springfield.

By the mid-1960s, Fontaine Bros. was also constructing industrial and commercial facilities at Memorial Industrial Park in Springfield. Over a two-year period, it built plants and offices for five companies, representing more than $7.5 million in construction. The projects included the United States Envelope Company plant and headquarters, a regional office building for A&P, a 60,000-square-foot plant for Springfield Wire, Inc., and an 18,000-square-foot plant for Hampden Color and Chemical.

In September 1967, Fontaine Bros. announced plans to construct a 15,000-square-foot corporate headquarters in the industrial park. Ground was broken the following month. The company planned to occupy the second floor of the two-story building while leasing the first floor and to relocate from its previous premises on Bay Street.

Raymond E. Fontaine was president of the company at the time, while George Fontaine served as vice president. The company employed more than 300 people by 1967. That year, Fontaine Bros. had ranked among the 400 largest contractors in the United States in each of the preceding four years.

As new school construction slowed during the 1980s, Fontaine Bros. increased its involvement in renovation projects. The MarketPlace project, begun in 1980, involved reconstructing several buildings on Main Street in downtown Springfield and formed part of the redevelopment of the area. Other renovation projects included Morgan Square, Springfield City Hall and Symphony Hall, and Roundhouse Plaza in Northampton.

During the decade, the company also constructed approximately 10,000 apartment and residential units.

Fontaine Bros. also participated in real-estate development during the late 1980s, although it later withdrew from that. Lester Fontaine said in 1993 that the company's bonding insurer discouraged development activity because of the additional financial risk.

Among those ventures was the Hollywood housing rehabilitation project in Springfield's South End, which was planned to include 174 subsidized apartments and 64 market-rate units. The project encountered difficulties before the market-rate units were completed. Fontaine Bros. and Springfield attorney Anthony W. Ravosa Sr. also proposed two luxury condominium towers on the city's riverfront. The plan was subsequently reduced in scale and ultimately abandoned after the developers were unable to presell enough units.

Raymond Fontaine retired in 1988, and his brother Lester Fontaine, who had spent his first 20 years with the company as a job superintendent, became president.

In September 1990, the Springfield School Building Commission voted to award Fontaine Bros. a $15.04 million contract to construct a 1,000-pupil magnet school in the city's Mason Square neighborhood, later known as the Rebecca M. Johnson School. Fontaine Bros. had submitted the third-lowest of ten bids. The commission and Mayor Mary E. Hurley cited affirmative-action and performance concerns involving the two lower bidders in explaining the award, and the decision could be appealed to the Massachusetts Department of Labor and Industries. A member of the commission described Fontaine Bros. as a reputable local builder but said there had been no special effort to direct the contract to a local company. The school was completed in 1993.

In 1995, Lester Fontaine's son, David P. Fontaine, then 35 and serving as a vice president, was appointed president. Lester Fontaine became chairman of the board, and David Fontaine's first cousin, Christopher Fontaine, was promoted to executive vice president. Both were grandsons of co-founder Eudore Fontaine. The Republican described Fontaine Bros. at the time as Springfield's largest contracting firm and reported that approximately 80 percent of its work was publicly funded.

Projects undertaken during this period included the renovation and expansion of Springfield's High School of Science and Technology, which involved $11.6 million in work on an existing four-story building and $4.8 million in new construction. The company also worked on Milton Bradley Elementary School in Springfield, Fairview Veterans Memorial Middle School in Chicopee, and William E. Norris Elementary School in Southampton. Its private-sector clients included Amherst College, Smith College, and Big Y.

By 2000, Fontaine Bros. reported average annual sales of approximately $140 million. It employed about 25 people in its main office and approximately 150 in the field and had built or renovated about 50 schools in Massachusetts during the preceding decade. The company had more than a dozen school projects under construction in western Massachusetts, including high schools in Belchertown, Ludlow, Monson, and Fitchburg, the Boland Learning Center in Springfield, and a $6.7 million athletic complex at Holyoke Community College. It had also constructed Easthampton's public safety complex during the 1990s and undertaken work for the Williston Northampton School.

Among the school projects completed in the 15 years leading up to 2010 were Belchertown High School, Chestnut Middle School in Springfield, an addition to Green Meadow School in Hampden, and Ashland High School, which later served as the model school for the new Minnechaug Regional High School.

David P. Fontaine Jr., a great-grandson of co-founder Eudore Fontaine, was promoted to vice president in March 2014. Before the promotion, he had worked in field labor, project management, green-building projects, business development, and operations. He remained vice president in 2020 and had become chief executive officer by 2024.

During the 2010s and early 2020s, the company expanded its operations in central Massachusetts. Worcester Business Journal reported in 2020 that annual revenue had increased from approximately $65 million in 2010 to more than $250 million. BusinessWest reported in 2023 that revenue had reached more than $280 million. Fontaine Bros. had opened an office in Worcester in 2017; by 2023 the office had expanded to more than 6,000 square feet.

In 2016, the company was selected as construction manager at risk for the $55 million Pope Francis High School in Springfield, built on the site of Cathedral High School following damage caused by the June 2011 tornado.

The Worcester South High Community School was constructed through the Fontaine–Rich joint venture. The 360,000-square-foot school was reported as a $167 million construction project, while Worcester Business Journal described the overall project as costing about $200 million and as the largest public project in Worcester's history. It received an Engineering News-Record Award of Merit in 2022.

In July 2021, Fontaine Bros. was named general contractor for the redevelopment of the former Court Square Hotel at 31 Elm Street in Springfield, a project that converted the 1890s building into 71 apartments with ground-floor retail space. Initially announced as a $50 million project, its reported cost had risen to $64 million by 2022, and the redevelopment was completed in 2023.

The company also participated in the construction of the $293 million Doherty Memorial High School in Worcester through the Fontaine + DIMEO joint venture. Ground was broken in November 2021, and the 426,000-square-foot school opened on August 26, 2024.

In September 2023, Fontaine Bros. broke ground on the $112 million David Prouty High School project in Spencer, involving a 127,000-square-foot addition and renovation. In January 2024, the company was selected for the $194.3 million East Longmeadow High School and natatorium project, comprising a 191,796-square-foot school and a six-lane community swimming pool.

In February 2026, the company received a $50.5 million contract to expand Greylock Elementary School in North Adams from approximately 55,000 to 73,000 square feet.

== Recognition ==
By 1967, Fontaine Bros. had been ranked among the 400 largest contractors in the United States in Engineering News-Record's annual survey for each of the preceding four years. The company was ranked 74th on Engineering News-Record's 2015 Top 100 Green Contractors list, up from 78th the previous year. The Worcester South High Community School, delivered by the firm in a joint venture, received an Award of Merit in the K–12 education category of the 2022 Engineering News-Record New York/New England Best Projects program.
