= Lubbock Hawks =

- Sport: Basketball
- Founded: 2005
- Folded: 2005
- League: National Women's Basketball League
- Based in: Lubbock, Texas
- Championships: 0

The Lubbock Hawks were a women's professional basketball team in the National Women's Basketball League (NWBL). Based in Lubbock, Texas, they played in 2005.
