= Bowling Green Falcons women's basketball =

2025–26 Bowling Green Falcons women's basketball team
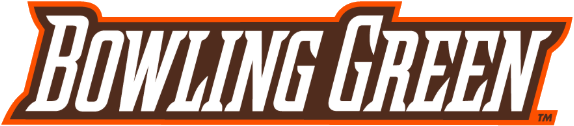
- University: Bowling Green State University
- Head coach: Fred Chmiel (2nd season)
- Location: Bowling Green, Ohio
- Arena: Stroh Center (capacity: 4,700)
- Conference: Mid-American
- Nickname: Falcons
- Colors: Brown and orange

NCAA Division I tournament Sweet Sixteen
- 2007

NCAA Division I tournament appearances
- 1987, 1988, 1989, 1990, 1993, 1994, 2005, 2006, 2007, 2010, 2011

AIAW tournament appearances
- 1974, 1975

Conference tournament champions
- 1987, 1988, 1989, 1990, 1993, 1994, 2005, 2006, 2007, 2010, 2011

Conference regular-season champions
- 1987, 1988, 1989, 1993, 1994, 2005, 2006, 2007, 2008, 2009, 2010, 2012, 2014, 2021

Conference division champions
- 2005, 2006, 2007, 2008, 2009, 2010, 2011, 2012, 2014

Uniforms
Home	Away

The Bowling Green Falcons women's basketball team is the NCAA Division I women's basketball team that represents Bowling Green State University. The team plays at the 4,700-seat Stroh Center on the BGSU campus in Bowling Green, Ohio, United States. The Falcons compete in the Mid-American Conference.

== History ==
The Falcons have won the most MAC Championships, winning eleven tournament championships since its admission into the MAC in 1981. The team last played in the NCAA Division I women's basketball tournament in 2011. The Falcons became the first team from the MAC to reach the NCAA Division I women's basketball tournament Sweet Sixteen, after they upset the second seed Vanderbilt 59–56 at the Breslin Student Events Center in East Lansing, Michigan in 2007.

=== Coaching history ===
Coach	Years	Seasons	Record	Pct.	Conf. record	Pct.	Conf. titles (Reg. season)	Conf. titles (Tournament)	AIAW/NCAA Tournament appearances	National titles
Sue Hager	1973–76	3	38–13	.745	N/a	N/a	N/a	N/a	2	0
Nora Liu	1976–78	2	11–17	.393	N/a	N/a	N/a	N/a	0	0
Kathy Bole	1978–84	6	71–81	.467	23–22	.511	0	0	0	0
Fran Voll	1984–91	7	144–60	.706	89–27	.767	3	4	4	0
Jaci Clark	1991–98	7	135–65	.675	92–32	.742	2	2	2	0
Dee Knoblauch	1998–01	3	35–49	.417	23–25	.479	0	0	0	0
Curt Miller	2001–12	9	206–80	.720	107–36	.748	6	4	4	0
Jennifer Roos	2012–2018	6	92-97	.487	43-63	.406	1	0	0	0
Robyn Fralick	2018–2023	5	88–73	.547	43–49	.467	1	0	0	0
Fred Chmiel	2023–present									
Totals	1973–present	39	734–409	.642	378–168	.692	12	10	12	0

- Bowling Green did not belong to a conference until the 1981–82 season.
- Records as of the end of the 2012–13 season.

== Season-by-season results ==
This is a partial list of the last five seasons completed by the Falcons.
Records as of July 30, 2010.

Season	Overall	Conference	Finish	Conf. Tourney	Postseason
2005–06	28–3	16–0	1st-East	MAC Champions	Lost in NCAA First Round, (UCLA)
2006–07	31–4	15–1	1st-East	MAC Champions	Lost in NCAA Sweet Sixteen, (Arizona State)
2007–08	26–8	13–3	1st-East	Lost in MAC Semifinals, (Ohio)	Lost in WNIT 2nd Round, (Michigan State)
2008–09	29–5	15–1	1st-East	Lost in MAC Finals, (Ball State)	Lost in WNIT 3rd Round, (Indiana)
2009–10	27–7	14–2	1st-East	MAC Champions	Lost in NCAA First Round, (Michigan State)

== Postseason appearances ==
=== NCAA Tournament results ===
The Falcons have appeared in eleven NCAA Tournaments. Their combined record is 3–11.

Year	Seed	Round	Opponent	Result
1987	#9	First Round	#8 Illinois	L 64–80
1988	#10	First Round	#7 St. Joseph's	L 66–68
1989	#9	First Round; Second Round	#8 Cincinnati #1 Maryland	W 69–59; L 65–78
1990	#12	First Round	#5 South Carolina	L 50–93
1993	#7	First Round	#10 Florida	L 67–69
1994	#7	First Round	#10 Creighton	L 73–84
2005	#13	First Round	#4 Kansas State	L 60–70
2006	#12	First Round	#5 UCLA	L 61–74
2007	#7	First Round; Second Round; Sweet Sixteen	#10 Oklahoma State #2 Vanderbilt #3 Arizona State	W 70–66; W 60–59; L 49–67
2010	#12	First Round	#5 Michigan State	L 62–72
2011	#12	First Round	#5 Georgia Tech	L 58–69

=== WNIT ===
The Falcons have appeared in the Women's National Invitation Tournament eight times. They have a record of 12–8.

Year	Round	Opponent	Result
1998	First round	Butler	L 90–95
2008	First round Second round	Dayton; Michigan State	W 64–52; L 66–74
2009	Second round Third round	Syracuse; Indiana	W 72–69; L 67–75
2012	First round	VCU	L 71–72
2013	First round Second round Third round	SMU; Duquesne; Drexel	W 76–70; W 61–54; L 47–50
2014	First round Second round Third round Quarterfinals	High Point; St. Bonaventure; Michigan; Rutgers	W 72–62; W 76–65; W 63–53; L 50–55
2021	First round Consolation; Consolation championship	Creighton; Dayton; Drake	L 65–72; W 77–76; L 68–78
2023	First round Second round Super 16; Great 8 Fab 4	Liberty; Green Bay; Memphis; Florida; Columbia	W 87–80; W 69–51; W 73–60; W 69–52; L 70–77

=== WBI ===
Bowling Green has appeared in the Women's Basketball Invitational once. They have a record of 2–1.

Year	Round	Opponent	Result
2022	First round Semifinals; Third-place game	Furman; St. Mary's; Nevada	W 82–61; L 67–76; W 73–65

=== AIAW ===
Year	Round
1974	Second Round
1975	Sixth

== See also ==
- Bowling Green Falcons
- Mid-American Conference
