= Springfield Spirit =

Defunct women's professional basketball team

- Sport: Basketball
- Founded: 2001
- Folded: 2004
- League: National Women's Basketball League
- Based in: Springfield, Massachusetts
- Owner: Steven A. Fox III

The Springfield Spirit were a women's professional basketball team in the National Women's Basketball League (NWBL), based in Springfield, Massachusetts. The team finished in last place in the league in 2001.

In 2002, the Spirit signed former UConn Huskies women's basketball players Sue Bird and Swin Cash. That year, the team recruited cheerleaders, including sixth-, seventh-, and eighth graders, from Holy Cross School.
