= Colorado Chill =

American women's basketball team

- Founded: 2003
- Folded: 2006
- League: National Women's Basketball League
- Team history: Colorado Chill; 2003-2006
- Based in: Loveland, Colorado
- Arena: Budweiser Events Center
- Colors: Ice Blue, Black
- Owner: Dave King
- Head coach: Kelly Packard
- Championships: 2 (2005, 2006)
- Mascot: Rebound

The Colorado Chill were a professional women's basketball team playing in the National Women's Basketball League (NWBL) from 2004 to 2006. Based in Loveland, Colorado. They were Colorado's second and longest-lived women's pro basketball team. The Chill won the final two championships of the NWBL, which folded in 2007.

In 2007, investors attempted to and failed to raise enough money so that the team could join the Women's National Basketball Association (WNBA) for the 2008 season.

== Franchise history ==
The Chill played in all league championship game and won back-to-back championships in 2005 and 2006. They were undefeated on their home court for 26 games until losing to the San Diego Siege on February 14, 2006. They compiled a 47–18 record for a .723 winning percentage and never finished out of first place in the regular season. Star players for the Chill included Ruth Riley, Katie Cronin, and Becky Hammon.

=== NWBL Team Records ===
Season	W	L	Win %	Result
2004	15	6	.714	Regular Season Champions
2005	16	8	.667	NWBL Champions
2006	16	4	.800	NWBL Champions

=== End ===
On June 19, 2006, the Chill's owner, Dave King, announced that the Chill would not participate in the NWBL's 2007 season. He said that the league and other owners owed him money, and that the league did not have adequate prospects for financial stability. The league later disbanded before the 2007 season started, making the Chill the final champions.

=== 2007: Attempt to join the WNBA ===
On March 16, 2007, King announced that he acquired most of the $15 million needed to revive the Chill as an expansion team in the WNBA for the 2008 season. Kroenke Sports Enterprises, owner of the NBA's Denver Nuggets, expressed active interest in hosting some of the Chill's games, in Denver, at the Pepsi Center. On September 12, 2007, however, it was announced that the Chill would not be an expansion team for the 2008 season due to the lack of funds raised.
