= Mobile Majesty =

- Sport: Basketball
- Founded: 2001
- Folded: 2001
- League: National Women's Basketball League
- Based in: Mobile, Alabama
- Championships: 0

The Mobile Majesty were one of the original franchises of the National Women's Basketball League (NWBL). Based in Mobile, Alabama, they played in 2001.
