= Chicago Blaze (basketball) =

American basketball team (2002–2005)

- Sport: Basketball
- Founded: 2002
- Folded: 2005
- League: National Women's Basketball League
- Based in: Chicago, Illinois
- Championships: 0

The Chicago Blaze were a women's professional basketball team in the National Women's Basketball League (NWBL). Based in Chicago, Illinois, they played from 2002 until folding in 2005.
