= San Francisco Legacy =

- Sport: Basketball
- Founded: 2001
- Folded: 2006
- League: National Women's Basketball League
- Team history: Kansas City Legacy (2001-2002); Tennessee Fury (2003); Dallas Fury (2004-2005); San Francisco Legacy (2006)
- Based in: Oakland, California
- Arena: Ira Jenkins Center
- Colors: Blue, Black
- Owner: Charles Davis and Daryl Harrison
- Head coach: Charles Davis
- Championships: 1 (2004)

The San Francisco Legacy were the last original franchise of the National Women's Basketball League (NWBL). Originally established in 2001 as the Kansas City Legacy, the franchise moved in 2003 to Knoxville, Tennessee, and became the Tennessee Fury. Then in 2004 it moved to Dallas, and was known as the Dallas Fury, where it won the league championship that year. The team moved to Oakland and took its original name in 2006.

== Team record ==
- 2001 -
- 2002 -
- 2003 -
- 2004 -
- 2005 -
- 2006 - 0–18
