= Birmingham Power =

- Sport: Basketball
- Founded: 2001
- Folded: 2005
- League: National Women's Basketball League
- Based in: Birmingham, Alabama

The Birmingham Power were one of the original franchises of the National Women's Basketball League (NWBL). Based in Birmingham, Alabama, they played from 2001 to 2005.
