= National Women's Basketball League =

American women's basketball league, 1997–2007

National Women's Basketball League (NWBL)
- Logo NWBL
- Sport: Basketball
- Founded: 1997
- Folded: 2007
- No. of teams: 3
- Country: United States
- Continent: FIBA Americas (Americas)
- Last champion: Colorado Chill (2nd title)
- Most titles: Colorado Chill; Houston Stealth (2 titles each)
- Website: www.NWBL.com (archive link)

The National Women's Basketball League, often abbreviated to the NWBL, was an organization governing professional basketball leagues for women in the United States. The league was founded in 1997 and began play in the Fall of that year. The league held its season during the off-season of the WNBA. During the WNBA off-season, some WNBA players would play in the NWBL. The league ceased operations in 2007.

== History ==
In contrast to the ABL, WBA, and the WNBA before it, the NWBL was founded to govern a competitive amateur league for women. The NWBL was founded in 1997, in the shadow of both the ABL and the WNBA. The league is considered to be the brainchild of Patrick Alexander and Kevin Szotkowski, who saw the rapid growth of women's athletics of the time and decided to go into the business of promoting women athletes. With the assistance of former college basketball players and NWBL co-founders Jolynn Schneider and Jeanine Michealsen, Alexander and Szotkowski launched an aggressive marketing campaign in the Fall of 1997 to recruit players and teams.

Although the recruitment campaign was not without its problems (including the death of Nick Johnson, co-founder of the marketing firm behind the league), the NWBL enrolled four teams by November and held its first championship series in December 1997. The first four teams enrolled were the San Diego Waves (considered to be the first NWBL team), the Columbus Lady Blazers, the Washington DC Defenders and the Long Beach Lightning. By the end of 2000, the league grew to encompass 600 players in 15 states and 26 cities.

The 2001 season was the first season for the NWBL Pro League, which then served as the primary organization for the NWBL. The first four teams in the newly formed league were the Atlanta Justice, the Birmingham Power, the Mobile Majesty and the Kansas City Legacy. The league managed to finish its first season in April 2001 when the Atlanta Justice won the 1st NWBL Pro Cup.

Since 2001, the NWBL Pro League played host to such WNBA stars as Sheryl Swoopes, Sue Bird, Tamika Catchings and Becky Hammon. The league folded in 2007, and since then the WNBA and WABA have been the only Women's Professional leagues in the United States.

== NWBL Pro League teams ==
=== Past teams ===
- Atlanta Justice (2001–02)
- Birmingham Power (2001–05)
- Chicago Blaze (2002–05)
- Colorado Chill (2004–06)
- Grand Rapids Blizzard (2003)
- Houston Stealth (2002–04)
- Iowa Cornettes (2004)
- Lubbock Hawks (2005)
- Mobile Majesty (2001)
- San Francisco Legacy (2006, Dallas Fury 2004-05, Tennessee Fury 2003, Kansas City Legacy 2001-02)
- San Diego Siege (2006)
- San Jose Spiders (2005–06)
- Springfield Spirit (2002–04)

=== Champions ===
- 2001 Atlanta Justice 90-75 Birmingham Power
- 2002 Houston Stealth 68-59 Chicago Blaze
- 2003 Houston Stealth 95-76 Tennessee Fury
- 2004 Dallas Fury 73-69 Colorado Chill
- 2005 Colorado Chill 77-70 Dallas Fury
- 2006 Colorado Chill 78-71 San Diego Siege

== See also ==
- American Basketball League
- Women's American Basketball Association
- Women's Basketball Association
- Women's National Basketball Association
- Women's Professional Basketball League
