= 2001 Washington Mystics season =

- Head coach: Tom Maher
- Arena: MCI Center

Results
- Record: 10–22 (.313)
- Place: 8th (Eastern)
- Playoff finish: Did not qualify

Media
- Television: WBDC (WB 50); Comcast SportsNet Mid-Atlantic

The 2001 WNBA season was the fourth season for the Washington Mystics. The Mystics finished with the worst record in the Eastern Conference.

== Transactions ==
=== WNBA draft ===
Round	Pick	Player	Nationality	School/Team/Country
1	9	Coco Miller	United States	Georgia
2	25	Tamara Stocks	United States	Florida
3	41	Jamie Lewis	United States	Ohio State
3	44	Elena Karpova	Russia	MBK Ružomberok (Slovakia)

=== Transactions ===
Date	Transaction
December 21, 2000	Hired Tom Maher as Head Coach
April 17, 2001	Traded a 2001 2nd Round Pick to the Minnesota Lynx in exchange for Annie Burgess
April 17, 2001	Traded Andrea Nagy and a 2001 4th Round Pick to the New York Liberty in exchange for a 2001 2nd Round Pick and 2001 3rd Round Pick
April 20, 2001	Drafted Coco Miller, Tamara Stocks, Jamie Lewis and Elena Karpova in the 2001 WNBA draft
April 30, 2001	Signed Audrey Sauret, Belinda Snell and Helen Luz
May 9, 2001	Waived Renee Robinson
May 18, 2001	Waived Elena Karpova
May 21, 2001	Waived Beth Cunningham
May 27, 2001	Traded Keisha Anderson to the Charlotte Sting in exchange for Cass Bauer Bilodeau
May 27, 2001	Waived Jamie Lewis and Michelle Campbell
May 27, 2001	Suspended contracts of Audrey Sauret, Belinda Snell and Jenny Whittle
June 8, 2001	Waived Belinda Snell
June 20, 2001	Waived Jenny Whittle
December 5, 2001	Traded Nikki McCray, a 2002 2nd Round Pick and a 2002 4th Round Pick to the Indiana Fever in exchange for Angie Braziel, a 2002 1st Round Pick and a 2002 3rd Round Pick

== Roster ==
2001 Washington Mystics roster
Players
Coaches

Pos.	No.	Nat.	Name	Height	Weight	DOB	From	Yrs
G	32	(United States)	Aldridge, Markita	5' 11" (1.8m)		1973-09-15	Charlotte	2
C	34	(United States)	Bauer Bilodeau, Cass	6' 4" (1.93m)	180 lb (82kg)	1972-06-27	Montana State	2
F	40	(United States)	Bullett, Vicky	6' 3" (1.91m)	185 lb (84kg)	1967-10-04	Maryland	4
G	35	(Australia)	Burgess, Annie	5' 7" (1.7m)	141 lb (64kg)	1969-03-10		1
F	23	(United States)	Holdsclaw, Chamique	6' 2" (1.88m)	172 lb (78kg)	1977-08-09	Tennessee	2
G	25	(Brazil)	Luz, Helen	5' 8" (1.73m)	144 lb (65kg)	1972-11-23		R
G	15	(United States)	McCray, Nikki	5' 11" (1.8m)	158 lb (72kg)	1971-12-17	Tennessee	3
G	9	(United States)	Miller, Coco	5' 4" (1.63m)	190 lb (86kg)	1978-09-06	Georgia	R
C	5	(United States)	Mills, Tausha	6' 3" (1.91m)	232 lb (105kg)	1976-02-29	Alabama	1
F	10	(United States)	Page, Murriel	6' 2" (1.88m)	160 lb (73kg)	1975-09-18	Florida	3
G	6	(France)	Sauret, Audrey	5' 11" (1.8m)		1976-10-31		R
F/C	42	(United States)	Stocks, Tamara	6' 3" (1.91m)		1979-01-29	Florida	R
F	4	(United States)	Washington, Tonya	6' 0" (1.83m)		1977-12-30	Florida	1
C	12	(Australia)	Whittle, Jenny	6' 5" (1.96m)		1973-09-05		1

Head coach
(Australia) Tom Maher
Assistant coaches
(United States) Marianne Stanley

Legend

- (C) Team captain
- (DP) Unsigned draft pick
- (FA) Free agent
- (S) Suspended
- Injured

== Schedule ==
=== Regular season ===
2001 game log
Total: 10–22 (Home: 8–8; Road: 2–14)
May: 0–1 (Home: 0–0; Road: 0–1)

Game	Date	Team	Score	High points	High rebounds	High assists	Location Attendance	Record
1	May 31	@ Cleveland	L 34–69	Holdsclaw; Washington (8)	Vicky Bullett (9)	Burgess; McCray; Washington (2)	Gund Arena	0–1

June : 3–8 (Home: 3–4; Road: 0–4)

Game	Date	Team	Score	High points	High rebounds	High assists	Location Attendance	Record
2	June 3	Seattle	W 68–63	Chamique Holdsclaw (18)	Chamique Holdsclaw (11)	Burgess; Page (4)	MCI Center	1–1
3	June 5	Sacramento	W 75–72	Chamique Holdsclaw (19)	Chamique Holdsclaw (16)	Helen Luz (5)	MCI Center	2–1
4	June 10	New York	L 80–81	Chamique Holdsclaw (31)	Chamique Holdsclaw (13)	Holdsclaw; Page (5)	MCI Center	2–2
5	June 14	@ Detroit	L 65–80	Holdsclaw; McCray; Washington (11)	Vicky Bullett (5)	Murriel Page (3)	The Palace of Auburn Hills	2–3
6	June 16	@ New York	L 63–86	Helen Luz (15)	Chamique Holdsclaw (8)	Annie Burgess (4)	Madison Square Garden	2–4
7	June 17	Cleveland	L 55–57	Chamique Holdsclaw (22)	Chamique Holdsclaw (13)	Annie Burgess (6)	MCI Center	2–5
8	June 21	Miami	L 63–74	Luz; McCray (15)	Vicky Bullett (7)	Luz; Sauret (3)	MCI Center	2–6
9	June 23	@ Orlando	L 59–67	Chamique Holdsclaw (18)	Chamique Holdsclaw (15)	Annie Burgess (5)	TD Waterhouse Centre	2–7
10	June 25	Minnesota	L 51–55	Chamique Holdsclaw (23)	Murriel Page (9)	Holdsclaw; Sauret (3)	MCI Center	2–8
11	June 27	@ Houston	L 63–76	Chamique Holdsclaw (21)	Chamique Holdsclaw (14)	Holdsclaw; Luz; McCray (3)	Compaq Center	2–9
12	June 29	Utah	W 74–64	Chamique Holdsclaw (17)	Chamique Holdsclaw (11)	Chamique Holdsclaw (6)	MCI Center	3–9

July : 5–7 (Home: 3–2; Road: 2–5)

Game	Date	Team	Score	High points	High rebounds	High assists	Location Attendance	Record
13	July 1	Orlando	W 76–64	Vicky Bullett (24)	Vicky Bullett; Page (10)	Audrey Sauret (8)	MCI Center	4–9
14	July 3	@ Seattle	W 72–69 (4OT)	Nikki McCray (20)	Chamique Holdsclaw (15)	Holdsclaw; Sauret (3)	KeyArena	5–9
15	July 6	@ Portland	L 58–69	Chamique Holdsclaw (20)	Vicky Bullett (9)	Holdsclaw; Page; McCray; Washington (3)	Rose Garden	5–10
16	July 7	@ Phoenix	L 52–66	Nikki McCray (10)	Chamique Holdsclaw (8)	Helen Luz (4)	America West Arena	5–11
17	July 11	Detroit	L 52–64	Nikki McCray (12)	Vicky Bullett (9)	Annie Burgess (3)	MCI Center	5–12
18	July 14	Los Angeles	L 50–62	Helen Luz (14)	Bullett; Page (9)	Burgess; Sauret (3)	MCI Center	5–13
19	July 20	@ Indiana	L 65–73	Nikki McCray (25)	Vicky Bullett (14)	Annie Burgess (9)	Conseco Fieldhouse	5–14
20	July 22	Indiana	W 69–61	Chamique Holdsclaw (19)	Vicky Bullett (12)	Annie Burgess (8)	MCI Center	6–14
21	July 24	@ Orlando	L 63–71	Vicky Bullett (14)	Chamique Holdsclaw (7)	Murriel Page (4)	TD Waterhouse Centre	6–15
22	July 26	@ Charlotte	L 60–62	Chamique Holdsclaw (15)	Holdsclaw; Mills (7)	Burgess; Holdsclaw (2)	Charlotte Coliseum	6–16
23	July 27	@ Minnesota	W 62–60	Chamique Holdsclaw (22)	Chamique Holdsclaw (12)	Nikki McCray (6)	Target Center	7–16
24	July 29	Charlotte	W 55–42	Nikki McCray (23)	Chamique Holdsclaw (12)	Luz; Page (3)	MCI Center	8–16

August : 2–6 (Home: 2–2; Road: 0–4)

Game	Date	Team	Score	High points	High rebounds	High assists	Location Attendance	Record
25	August 1	@ Indiana	L 64–70	Chamique Holdsclaw (27)	Murriel Page (7)	Holdsclaw; Luz (3)	Conseco Fieldhouse	8–17
26	August 3	Portland	W 64–50	Burgess; McCray (13)	Vicky Bullett (10)	Chamique Holdsclaw (6)	MCI Center	9–17
27	August 5	@ Miami	L 44–52	Chamique Holdsclaw (18)	Bullett; Holdsclaw; Page (7)	Annie Burgess (3)	American Airlines Arena	9–18
28	August 6	Charlotte	L 60–65	Chamique Holdsclaw (17)	Bullett; Page (7)	Burgess; Holdsclaw; Page (3)	MCI Center	9–19
29	August 8	Miami	L 36–42	Chamique Holdsclaw (18)	Murriel Page (9)	Nikki McCray (2)	MCI Center	9–20
30	August 10	@ Detroit	L 63–69	Vicky Bullett (21)	Murriel Page (6)	Helen Luz (6)	The Palace of Auburn Hills	9–21
31	August 12	Cleveland	W 57–49	Nikki McCray (18)	Chamique Holdsclaw (16)	Chamique Holdsclaw (3)	MCI Center	10–21
32	August 14	@ New York	L 56–71	Chamique Holdsclaw (17)	Chamique Holdsclaw (9)	Burgess; Sauret (3)	Madison Square Garden	10–22

2001 season schedule

=== Season standings ===
Eastern Conference	W	L	PCT	Conf.	GB
Cleveland Rockers ^{x}	22	10	.688	15–6	–
New York Liberty ^{x}	21	11	.656	13–8	1.0
Miami Sol ^{x}	20	12	.625	14–7	2.0
Charlotte Sting ^{x}	18	14	.563	15–6	4.0
Orlando Miracle ^{o}	13	19	.406	9–12	9.0
Indiana Fever ^{o}	10	22	.313	7–14	12.0
Detroit Shock ^{o}	10	22	.313	7–14	12.0
Washington Mystics ^{o}	10	22	.313	4–17	12.0

== Statistics ==
Legend
GP	Games played	GS	Games started	MPG	Minutes per game	RPG	Rebounds per game
APG	Assists per game	SPG	Steals per game	BPG	Blocks per game	PPG	Points per game
FG%	Field-goal percentage	3P%	3-point field-goal percentage	FT%	Free-throw percentage	TO	Turnovers per game
PF	Fouls per game		Team leader		League leader

=== Regular season ===
Player	GP	GS	MPG	FG%	3P%	FT%	RPG	APG	SPG	BPG	PPG
Chamique Holdsclaw	29	29	33.6	.400	.239	.682	8.8	2.3	1.5	0.5	16.8
Vicky Bullett	32	32	33.5	.392	.297	.729	7.2	1.3	1.7	1.8	8.7
Murriel Page	32	32	30.9	.433	.235	.583	5.5	1.7	0.9	1.1	7.0
Nikki McCray	32	32	25.9	.410	.232	.711	1.8	1.5	0.8	0.0	11.0
Annie Burgess	31	27	23.6	.333	.298	.593	2.5	2.8	0.8	0.1	4.0
Audrey Sauret	25	3	18.2	.297	.115	.292	1.7	1.7	1.0	0.2	3.0
Helen Luz	32	3	15.3	.404	.390	.880	1.2	1.7	0.9	0.2	5.1
Tonya Washington	30	2	11.2	.360	.345	.818	1.4	0.3	0.1	0.1	3.4
Tausha Mills	30	0	10.6	.333	.000	.581	3.5	0.2	0.5	0.1	2.1
Markita Aldridge	5	0	7.0	.333	.000	1.000	0.4	0.4	0.0	0.0	1.4
Coco Miller	20	0	6.9	.325	.333	.545	0.5	0.4	0.3	0.0	1.7
Cass Bauer Bilodeau	15	0	6.8	.294	.000	.500	1.2	0.2	0.1	0.1	1.0
Jenny Whittle	4	0	5.0	.000	.000	.000	0.3	0.0	0.0	0.3	0.0
Tamara Stocks	3	0	3.7	.333	N/A	.500	0.7	0.0	0.0	0.0	1.0

^{‡}Waived/Released during the season
^{†}Traded during the season
^{≠}Acquired during the season
