= 2000 Washington Mystics season =

- Head coach: Nancy Darsch (fired Jul. 14, 9–11 record); Darrell Walker (interim, 5–7 record)
- Arena: MCI Center

Results
- Record: 14–18 (.438)
- Place: 4th (Eastern)
- Playoff finish: Lost First Round (2-0) to New York Liberty

The 2000 WNBA season was the third season for the Washington Mystics. The team clinched their first WNBA Playoff berth, eventually losing in a sweep to the New York Liberty.

== Transactions ==
=== Indiana Fever expansion draft ===
The following player was selected in the Indiana Fever expansion draft from the Washington Mystics:

Player	Nationality	School/Team/Country
Nyree Roberts	United States	Old Dominion
Rita Williams	United States	UConn

=== WNBA draft ===
Round	Pick	Player	Nationality	School/Team/Country
1	2	Tausha Mills	United States	Chicago Condors
2	18	Tonya Washington	United States	Florida

=== Transactions ===
Date	Transaction
December 15, 1999	Lost Nyree Roberts and Rita Williams to the Indiana Fever in the WNBA expansion draft
January 19, 2000	Traded Shalonda Enis and a 2000 3rd Round Pick to the Charlotte Sting in exchange for Vicky Bullett
April 25, 2000	Drafted Tausha Mills and Tonya Washington in the 2000 WNBA draft
May 2, 2000	Signed Beth Cunningham, Denique Graves, Itoro Coleman, Keisha Anderson, Kellie Harper, Michelle Campbell and Nakia Sanford
May 11, 2000	Waived Denique Graves and Itoro Coleman
May 12, 2000	Waived Penny Moore
May 25, 2000	Signed Itoro Coleman and Nyree Roberts
May 28, 2000	Waived Itoro Coleman and Nyree Roberts
July 14, 2000	Fired Head Coach Nancy Darsch
July 14, 2000	Hired Darrell Walker as Interim Head Coach
July 27, 2000	Signed Renee Robinson

== Roster ==
2000 Washington Mystics roster
Players
Coaches

Pos.	No.	Nat.	Name	Height	Weight	DOB	From	Yrs
G	32	(United States)	Aldridge, Markita	5' 11" (1.8m)		1973-09-15	Charlotte	1
G	12	(United States)	Anderson, Keisha	5' 7" (1.7m)	125 lb (57kg)	1974-05-08	Wisconsin	R
F	40	(United States)	Bullett, Vicky	6' 3" (1.91m)	185 lb (84kg)	1967-10-04	Maryland	3
C	7	(United States)	Campbell, Michelle	6' 5" (1.96m)	170 lb (77kg)	1974-02-20	USC	1
G	21	(United States)	Cunningham, Beth	6' 0" (1.83m)	150 lb (68kg)	1975-06-05	Notre Dame	R
F	23	(United States)	Holdsclaw, Chamique	6' 2" (1.88m)	172 lb (78kg)	1977-08-09	Tennessee	1
G	15	(United States)	McCray, Nikki	5' 11" (1.8m)	158 lb (72kg)	1971-12-17	Tennessee	2
C	5	(United States)	Mills, Tausha	6' 3" (1.91m)	232 lb (105kg)	1976-02-29	Alabama	R
G	11	(Hungarian People's Republic)	Nagy, Andrea	5' 7" (1.7m)	147 lb (67kg)	1971-11-16	FIU	1
F/C	44	(United States)	Owen, Heather	6' 5" (1.96m)	212 lb (96kg)	1976-05-06	Stanford	1
F	10	(United States)	Page, Murriel	6' 2" (1.88m)	160 lb (73kg)	1975-09-18	Florida	2
G	24	(United States)	Robinson, Renee	5' 11" (1.8m)		1978-06-15	Virginia	R
F	4	(United States)	Washington, Tonya	6' 0" (1.83m)		1977-12-30	Florida	R

Head coach
(United States) Darrell Walker (Arkansas)
Assistant coaches
(United States) Tyrone Beaman

Legend

- (C) Team captain
- (DP) Unsigned draft pick
- (FA) Free agent
- (S) Suspended
- Injured

== Schedule ==
=== Regular season ===
2000 game log
Total: 15–17 (Home: 8–8; Road: 7–9)
May: 1–0 (Home: 1–0; Road: 0–0)

Game	Date	Team	Score	High points	High rebounds	High assists	Location Attendance	Record
1	May 31	Orlando	W 92-66	Chamique Holdsclaw (29)	Chamique Holdsclaw (12)	Andrea Nagy (10)	MCI Center	1–0

June: 6–6 (Home: 3–4; Road: 3–2)

Game	Date	Team	Score	High points	High rebounds	High assists	Location Attendance	Record
2	June 3	@ Cleveland	L 49-72	Nikki McCray (24)	Vicky Bullett (5)	Andrea Nagy (7)	Gund Arena	1–1
3	June 4	New York	W 79-67	Chamique Holdsclaw (22)	Vicky Bullett (6)	Andrea Nagy (7)	MCI Center	2–1
4	June 7	Houston	L 54-81	Chamique Holdsclaw (16)	Chamique Holdsclaw (7)	Andrea Nagy (3)	MCI Center	2–2
5	June 8	@ Miami	W 73-51	Nikki McCray (21)	Murriel Page (10)	Andrea Nagy (7)	American Airlines Arena	3–2
6	June 13	@ New York	W 57-56	Chamique Holdsclaw (23)	Chamique Holdsclaw (12)	Andrea Nagy (6)	Madison Square Garden	4–2
7	June 17	@ Utah	L 67-70	Nikki McCray (20)	Murriel Page (8)	Andrea Nagy (7)	Delta Center	4–3
8	June 19	Detroit	W 80-55	Vicky Bullett (22)	Murriel Page (11)	Andrea Nagy (7)	MCI Center	5–3
9	June 21	Miami	L 55-57	Chamique Holdsclaw (20)	Chamique Holdsclaw (8)	Andrea Nagy (4)	MCI Center	5–4
10	June 23	Sacramento	L 69-84	Nikki McCray (19)	Mills; Page (4)	Andrea Nagy (10)	MCI Center	5–5
11	June 24	@ Detroit	W 76-70	Vicky Bullett (21)	Vicky Bullett (11)	Andrea Nagy (5)	The Palace of Auburn Hills	6–5
12	June 26	Los Angeles	L 72-74	Chamique Holdsclaw (25)	Vicky Bullett (10)	Andrea Nagy (5)	MCI Center	6–6
13	June 30	Phoenix	L 57-66	Nikki McCray (19)	Bullett; Holdsclaw (7)	Andrea Nagy (6)	MCI Center	6–7

July: 5–8 (Home: 2–4; Road: 3–4)

Game	Date	Team	Score	High points	High rebounds	High assists	Location Attendance	Record
14	July 1	@ Charlotte	W 78-74	Nikki McCray (18)	Chamique Holdsclaw (11)	Anderson; Holdsclaw (4)	Charlotte Coliseum	7–7
15	July 3	@ Seattle	W 60-55	Chamique Holdsclaw (21)	Chamique Holdsclaw (10)	Murriel Page (7)	KeyArena	8–7
16	July 6	@ Los Angeles	L 70-79	Nikki McCray (20)	Murriel Page (9)	Andrea Nagy (7)	Great Western Forum	8–8
17	July 8	@ Sacramento	L 56-78	Chamique Holdsclaw (16)	Tausha Mills (12)	Nikki McCray (3)	ARCO Arena	8–9
18	July 9	@ Portland	L 58-75	Chamique Holdsclaw (15)	Chamique Holdsclaw (12)	Andrea Nagy (4)	Delta Center	8–10
19	July 12	Indiana	L 58-81	Vicky Bullett (15)	Murriel Page (12)	Nikki McCray (4)	MCI Center	8–11
20	July 13	@ Miami	W 60-48	Nikki McCray (16)	Vicky Bullett (12)	McCray; Nagy (3)	American Airlines Arena	9–11
21	July 15	Charlotte	L 73-76	Vicky Bullett (22)	Bullett; Holdsclaw (8)	Anderson; Nagy (5)	MCI Center	9–12
22	July 20	Indiana	W 85-74	Chamique Holdsclaw (30)	Chamique Holdsclaw (9)	Anderson; Nagy; Page (4)	MCI Center	10–12
23	July 21	Orlando	W 61-59	Chamique Holdsclaw (16)	Murriel Page (7)	Anderson; Holdsclaw; McCray (3)	MCI Center	11–12
24	July 24	New York	L 64-78	Murriel Page (18)	Murriel Page (11)	Keisha Anderson (6)	MCI Center	11–13
25	July 26	@ Charlotte	L 80-87	Chamique Holdsclaw (21)	Chamique Holdsclaw (9)	Keisha Anderson (11)	Charlotte Coliseum	11–14
26	July 29	Minnesota	L 85-87	Nikki McCray (24)	Murriel Page (12)	Nikki McCray (7)	MCI Center	11–15

August: 3–3 (Home: 2–0; Road: 1–3)

Game	Date	Team	Score	High points	High rebounds	High assists	Location Attendance	Record
27	August 1	@ Houston	L 60-68	Chamique Holdsclaw (18)	Murriel Page (8)	Keisha Anderson (6)	Compaq Center	11–16
28	August 3	@ Indiana	W 75-71	Chamique Holdsclaw (22)	Chamique Holdsclaw (11)	Nikki McCray (7)	Conseco Fieldhouse	12–16
29	August 4	Detroit	W 96-72	Murriel Page (20)	Murriel Page (9)	Chamique Holdsclaw (6)	MCI Center	13–16
30	August 6	@ Cleveland	L 60-77	Chamique Holdsclaw (22)	Chamique Holdsclaw (6)	Keisha Anderson (4)	Gund Arena	13–17
31	August 7	@ Orlando	L 57-76	Bullett; Holdsclaw (14)	Chamique Holdsclaw (12)	Chamique Holdsclaw (6)	TD Waterhouse Centre	13–18
32	August 9	Cleveland	W 60-48	Nikki McCray (20)	Chamique Holdsclaw (10)	Keisha Anderson (7)	MCI Center	14–18

=== Playoffs ===
2000 playoff game log
First round vs. New York Liberty
Lost Series: 0–2

Game	Date	Team	Score	High points	High rebounds	High assists	Location Attendance	Record
1	August 12	New York	L 63–72	Vicky Bullett (22)	Bullett; Holdsclaw (8)	Nikki McCray (11)	MCI Center	0–1
2	August 14	@ New York	L 57–78	Aldridge; Holdsclaw (12)	Markita Aldridge (4)	Markita Aldridge (5)	Madison Square Garden	0–2

2000 playoff schedule

=== Season standings ===
Eastern Conference	W	L	PCT	Conf.	GB
New York Liberty ^{x}	20	12	.625	14–7	–
Cleveland Rockers ^{x}	17	15	.531	13–8	3.0
Orlando Miracle ^{x}	16	16	.500	13–8	4.0
Washington Mystics ^{x}	14	18	.438	13–8	6.0
Detroit Shock ^{o}	14	18	.438	10–11	6.0
Miami Sol ^{o}	13	19	.406	9–12	7.0
Indiana Fever ^{o}	9	23	.281	7–14	11.0
Charlotte Sting ^{o}	8	24	.250	5–16	12.0

== Statistics ==
Legend
GP	Games played	GS	Games started	MPG	Minutes per game	RPG	Rebounds per game
APG	Assists per game	SPG	Steals per game	BPG	Blocks per game	PPG	Points per game
FG%	Field-goal percentage	3P%	3-point field-goal percentage	FT%	Free-throw percentage	TO	Turnovers per game
PF	Fouls per game		Team leader		League leader

=== Regular season ===
Player	GP	GS	MPG	FG%	3P%	FT%	RPG	APG	SPG	BPG	PPG
Chamique Holdsclaw	32	32	35.3	.465	.256	.680	7.5	2.5	1.5	0.6	17.5
Vicky Bullett	32	32	34.2	.486	.324	.714	5.7	1.3	2.0	1.5	10.7
Nikki McCray	32	32	32.7	.434	.331	.769	1.8	2.7	1.4	0.2	15.5
Murriel Page	32	32	32.7	.590	N/A	.565	6.5	2.0	0.7	1.0	9.8
Andrea Nagy	23	23	30.2	.392	.359	.808	2.7	5.1	0.7	0.3	4.2
Keisha Anderson	30	9	14.5	.426	.375	.778	1.5	2.5	0.8	0.1	2.5
Tausha Mills	31	0	9.5	.438	N/A	.745	2.6	0.3	0.3	0.3	4.2
Markita Aldridge	29	0	9.4	.463	.500	.318	0.8	1.0	0.3	0.1	2.2
Beth Cunningham	21	0	9.4	.250	.243	.842	1.0	0.6	0.1	0.0	2.8
Heather Owen	11	0	5.5	.250	N/A	N/A	0.8	0.2	0.0	0.0	0.2
Tonya Washington	19	0	5.4	.276	.429	.667	0.7	0.3	0.1	0.0	1.4
Michelle Campbell	5	0	4.4	.400	N/A	1.000	0.4	0.2	0.0	0.2	1.2
Renee Robinson	2	0	2.5	.000	.000	1.000	0.0	0.0	0.5	0.0	2.0

^{‡}Waived/Released during the season
^{†}Traded during the season
^{≠}Acquired during the season
