= List of Florida Gators basketball players =

The following are lists of Florida Gators basketball players:

- List of Florida Gators women's basketball players in the WNBA
- List of Florida Gators in the NBA
