= List of University of Florida basketball players =

List of University of Florida basketball players may refer to:

- List of Florida Gators in the NBA
- List of Florida Gators in the WNBA
