= List of NCAA Division I women's basketball career assists leaders =

In basketball, an assist is a pass to a teammate that directly leads to a score by field goal. The top 25 highest assists totals in National Collegiate Athletic Association (NCAA) Division I women's basketball history are listed below. The NCAA did not immediately record assists throughout women's college basketball when it began sponsoring women's sports in the 1981–82 school year; it began recording assists in Division I in 1984–85.

The all-time leader in career assists is Suzie McConnell of Penn State. She recorded 1,307 assists in 128 games (10.21 per game average) between 1984–85 and 1987–88. Second on the list is Andrea Nagy of FIU, who compiled 1,165 assists. Only four other women have recorded 1,000 career assists at the Division I level: Caitlin Clark of Iowa (1,144), Courtney Vandersloot of Gonzaga (1,118), Sabrina Ionescu of Oregon (1,091), and Tine Freil of Pacific (1,088).

All but five of the players listed compiled their totals in the standard four seasons. The exceptions are Neacole Hall of Alabama State, who compiled 869 assists despite playing only three seasons in Division I (1986–87 to 1988–89), and five players who competed in five seasons: Lauren Park-Lane (2019–20 to 2023–24), Emily Ryan, Georgia Amoore (both 2020–21 to 2024–25), Rori Harmon (2021–22 to 2025–26), and Olivia Miles (2020–21 to 2025–26). Park-Lane, Ryan, Amoore, and Miles benefited from a blanket NCAA waiver that did not count the 2020–21 season, heavily disrupted by COVID-19, against the eligibility of any basketball player. Miles also benefited from an NCAA hardship waiver, popularly known as a "medical redshirt", due to missing the entire 2023–24 season to injury. Harmon, who started her college career after COVID, also received a similar hardship wqiver during her career.

Hall is also the all-time Division I leader in assists per game with 10.35, slightly ahead of McConnell's 10.21. In all, 16 of the top 25 players in career assists are also in the top 25 for assists per game. (Note: The career leaderboards for total assists and assists average in the 2019–20 Division I record book have 15 names in common. Sabrina Ionescu has since entered both lists, without displacing any of the other 15 players alluded to.)

Two schools have two players represented in the top 25 of the all-time career assists leader board — FIU with Nagy and Dalma Iványi, and Iowa with Clark and Samantha Logic. The aforementioned Park-Lane, Miles, and Amoore are the only individuals in the top 25 to have played at more than one school. All played four seasons at their original schools (Park-Lane at Seton Hall, Miles at Notre Dame, Amoore at Virginia Tech) before transferring for their final seasons (respectively to Mississippi State, TCU, and Kentucky).

Of the top 25, four were born outside the United States—Nagy and Iványi in Hungary, Freil in Denmark, and Amoore in Australia.

== Key ==
Pos.	G	F	C	Ref.
Position	Guard	Forward	Center	References

^	Player still competing in NCAA Division I
*	Elected to the Naismith Memorial Basketball Hall of Fame
Team (X)	Denotes the number of times a player from that team is represented on this list

== Top 25 career assists leaders ==
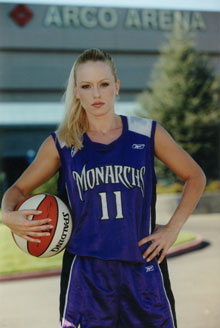
Andrea Nagy is second on the all-time list with 1,165 assists.

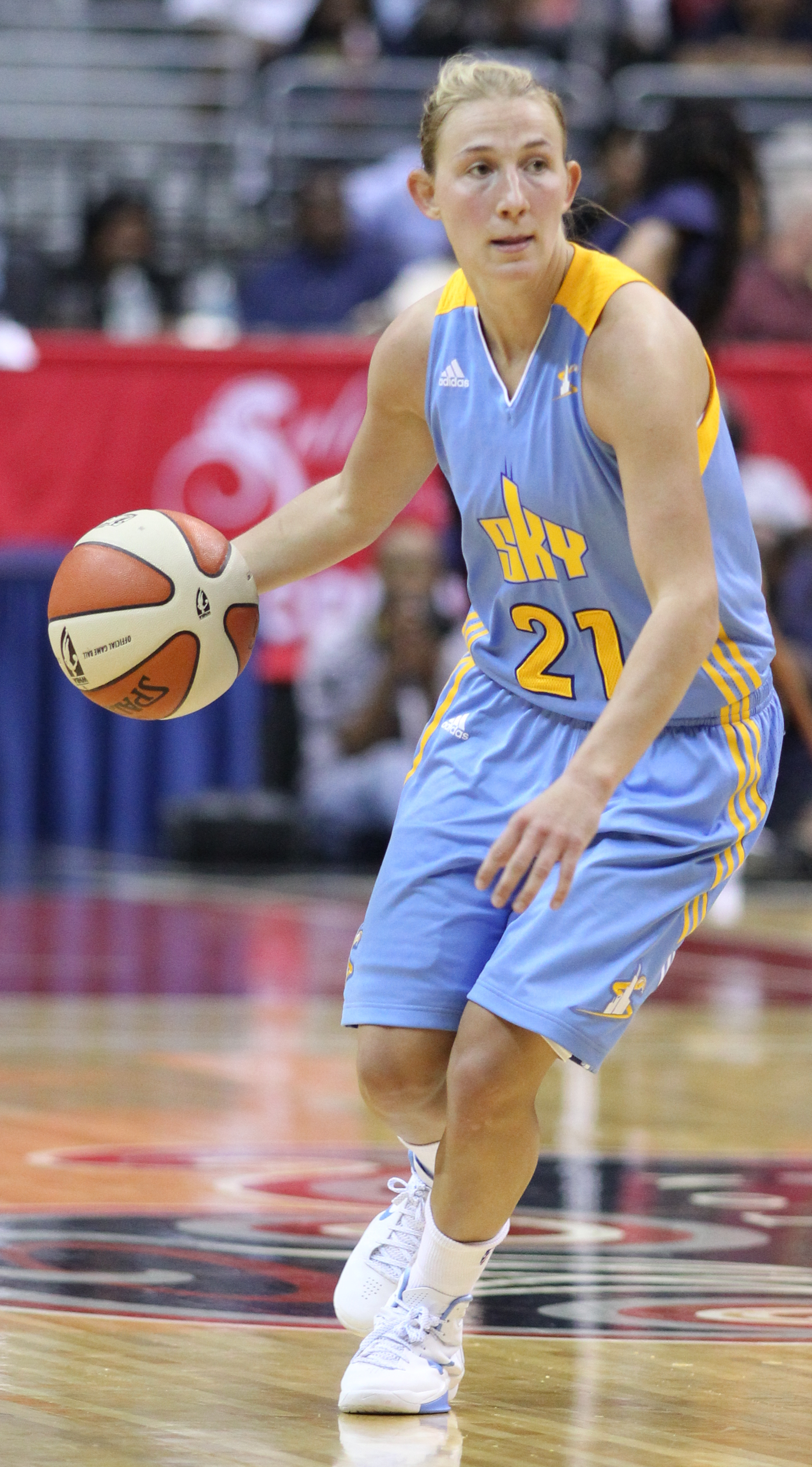
Courtney Vandersloot compiled 1,118 assists, the fourth-most all-time.

Current through the end of the 2025–26 season.

Player	Pos.	Team	Career start (Note: Reflects the calendar year in which the player's Division I career began. All listings of player records in official NCAA record books categorize seasons by the calendar years in which they ended.)	Career end	Games played	Assists	APG	Ref. (Note: Except as otherwise noted, references for each entry are from the most recent edition of the NCAA Division I women's basketball record book, cited in the "General references" section below.)
Suzie McConnell	G	Penn State	1984	1988	128	1,307	10.2	
Andrea Nagy	G	FIU	1991	1995	125	1,165	9.3	
Caitlin Clark	G	Iowa	2020	2024	139	1,144	8.2	
Courtney Vandersloot	G	Gonzaga	2007	2011	136	1,118	8.2	
Sabrina Ionescu	G	Oregon	2016	2020	142	1,091	7.7	
Tine Freil	G	Pacific	1989	1993	111	1,088	9.8	
Emily Ryan	G	Iowa State	2020	2025	153	993	6.5	
Niya Johnson	G	Baylor	2012	2016	146	988	6.8	
Shanya Evans	G	Providence	1987	1991	121	987	8.2	
Rori Harmon	G	Texas	2021	2026	158	986	6.2	
Temeka Johnson	G	LSU	2001	2005	129	945	7.3	
Ticha Penicheiro	G	Old Dominion	1994	1998	133	939	7.1	
La'Terrica Dobin	G	Northwestern State	2000	2004	113	921	8.2	
Lauren Park-Lane	G	Seton Hall / Mississippi State	2019	2024	155	911	5.9	
Olivia Miles	G	Notre Dame / TCU	2020	2026	139	906	6.5	
Yolanda Paige	G	West Virginia	2001	2005	120	902	7.5	
Samantha Prahalis	G	Ohio State	2008	2012	133	901	6.8	
Jackie Kemph	G	Saint Louis	2014	2018	132	899	6.8	
Samantha Logic	G	Iowa (2)	2011	2015	135	898	6.7	
Dalma Iványi	G	FIU (2)	1995	1999	106	896	8.5	
Nancy Kennelly	G	Northwestern	1989	1993	116	892	7.7	
Jamierra Faulkner	G	Southern Miss	2010	2014	124	883	7.1	
Neacole Hall	G	Alabama State	1986	1989	84	869	10.3	
Georgia Amoore	G	Virginia Tech / Kentucky	2020	2025	157	869	5.5	
Teresa Weatherspoon*	G	Louisiana Tech	1984	1988	131	858	6.5	
