= Florida Gators basketball =

The Florida Gators have two Gator basketball programs:

- Florida Gators men's basketball
- Florida Gators women's basketball
