= Tamara Stocks =

American basketball player (born 1979)

Personal information
- Born: January 29, 1979 (age 47) Akron, Ohio, U.S.
- Listed height: 6 ft 3 in (1.91 m)

Career information
- High school: Pickerington (Pickerington, Ohio)
- College: Florida (1997–2001)
- WNBA draft: 2001: 2nd round, 25th overall pick
- Drafted by: Washington Mystics
- Playing career: 2001–2006
- Position: Forward / center
- Number: 4

Career history
- 2001: Washington Mystics
- 2002–2003: Shanghai Octopus
- 2003–2004: PC Mendibil
- 2004–2005: ŽKK Gospić
- 2005: Cadí la Seu
- 2006: Grindavík
- Stats at Basketball Reference

Tamara Stocks Lee (born January 29, 1979), née Tamara Stocks, is an American former college and professional basketball player who was a forward and center in the Women's National Basketball Association (WNBA) for a single season in 2001. Stocks played college basketball for the University of Florida, and thereafter, played professionally for the Washington Mystics of the WNBA. She currently serves as public relations coordinator for B'Ball 101, LLC, an Atlanta-based player/athlete development company, and its non-profit, the Saved By The Ball Foundation, Inc..

== Early life ==
Stocks was born in Akron, Ohio. She played for Pickerington High School in Pickerington, Ohio, where she was named a high school All-American by the Women's Basketball Coaches Association.. She participated in the WBCA High School All-America Game where she scored eight points.

== College career ==
At the University of Florida, Stocks became one of the Florida Gators women's basketball team's all-time leaders in points and rebounds.. She is the first ever high school NIKE/WBCA All-American to sign with the Gators..

== Professional career ==
She graduated in 2001 and was selected 25th overall in the first round of the 2001 WNBA draft by the Washington Mystics. She played only one season in the WNBA.

In 2006, Stocks signed with Grindavík of the Icelandic Úrvalsdeild kvenna. She played Grindavík's last two regular season games, averaging 33.5 points, 15.0 rebounds and 4.0 blocks per game. In the playoffs, she averaged 29.5 points and 16.0 rebounds but was unable to prevent Grindavík from being knocked out by Keflavík in the semi-finals.

== Personal life ==
Her father, James Stocks, was the first African-American basketball player to graduate from Murray State University.. He also played for the Kentucky Colonels of the American Basketball Association (ABA)..

She resides in Atlanta, Georgia with her husband, Dorian A. Lee, and their 3 sons..

Stocks posed in the October 2001 issue of Playboy in the "Girls of the SEC" section.

== Career statistics ==
Legend
GP	Games played	GS	Games started	MPG	Minutes per game	RPG	Rebounds per game
APG	Assists per game	SPG	Steals per game	BPG	Blocks per game	PPG	Points per game
TO	Turnovers per game	FG%	Field-goal percentage	3P%	3-point field-goal percentage	FT%	Free-throw percentage
**Bold**	Career best	°	League leader

=== WNBA ===
WNBA regular season statistics
Year	Team	GP	GS	MPG	FG%	3P%	FT%	RPG	APG	SPG	BPG	TO	PPG
2001	Washington	3	0	3.7	33.3	—	50.0	0.7	0.0	0.0	0.0	0.0	1.0
**Career**	1 year, 1 team	3	0	3.7	33.3	—	50.0	0.7	0.0	0.0	0.0	0.0	1.0

=== College ===
College statistics
Year	Team	GP	Points	FG%	3P%	FT%	RPG	APG	SPG	BPG	PPG
1997-98	Florida	32	339	**53.7%**	0.0%	73.8%	4.7	0.8	0.6	0.3	10.6
1998-99	Florida	33	**368**	53.0%	0.0%	63.8%	**6.0**	0.8	1.0	0.3	**11.2**
1999-00	Florida	**34**	318	46.0%	0.0%	72.9%	4.9	0.6	1.2	0.3	9.4
2000-01	Florida	30	324	43.6%	0.0%	**77.2%**	5.1	**1.1**	**1.4**	**0.4**	10.8
**Career**		129	1349	49.0%	0.0%	71.6%	5.1	0.8	1.0	0.1	10.5

== See also ==
- List of Florida Gators in the WNBA
- List of University of Florida alumni
