= List of NCAA Division I women's basketball season assists leaders =

In basketball, an assist is a pass to a teammate that directly leads to a score by field goal. The National Collegiate Athletic Association's (NCAA) Division I (D-I) assist title is awarded to the player with the highest assists per game average in a given season. While the NCAA began sponsoring women's sports in the 1981–82 season, well after the NCAA established its current three-division alignment for competitive and governance purposes, it did not officially record assists until the 1984–85 season.

Suzie McConnell of Penn State holds the all-time D-I record for single-season assists per game (11.8), which she accomplished in 1986–87. She also recorded 355 assists that season, which is the second-highest single-season mark behind Gonzaga's Courtney Vandersloot, who recorded 367 in 2010–11 while playing 6 more games than McConnell did in 1986–87. The first woman to lead D-I in scoring and assists in the same season was Caitlin Clark for Iowa in 2021–22; she also led in both categories in 2023–24.

Nine players have earned multiple assist titles. La’Terrica Dobin of Northwestern State and Clark are the only ones to have earned three titles, respectively doing so from 2002–2004 and 2022–2024. Six others have earned the honor in consecutive seasons: McConnell (1986, 1987), Neacole Hall of Alabama State (1988, 1989), Andrea Nagy of FIU (1994, 1995), Dalma Iványi of FIU (1998, 1999), Vandersloot (2010, 2011), and Niya Johnson of Baylor (2015, 2016). The other player with two assists titles is Tiana Mangakahia of Syracuse, who won titles in 2017 and 2021, the latter after returning from breast cancer treatment.

Only two freshmen (Tine Freil and Michelle Burden) and five sophomores (McConnell, Dobin, Claire Faucher, Mangakahia, and Clark) have led Division I in average assists. Four players born outside the United States have led Division I in assists — Freil, born in Denmark; Nagy and Iványi, both born in Hungary; and Mangakahia, born in Australia.

== Key ==
| Pos. | G | F | C | APG | Ref. |
| Position | Guard | Forward | Center | Assists per game | References |

Class (Cl.) key
| Fr | Freshman | So | Sophomore | Jr | Junior | Sr | Senior |

| * | Elected to the Naismith Memorial Basketball Hall of Fame |
| Player (X) | Denotes the number of times the player had been the assists leader up to and including that season |

== Assists leaders ==
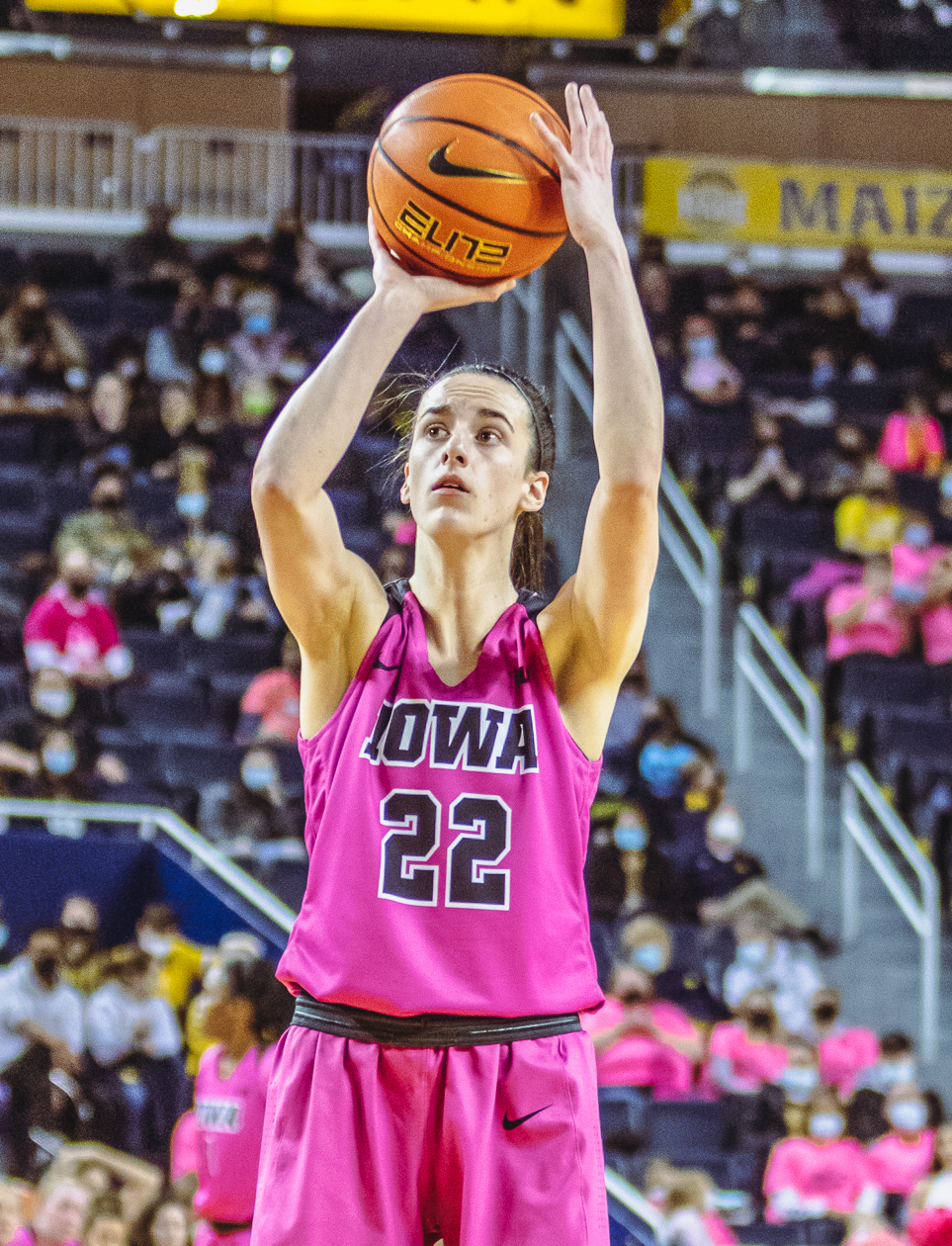
Caitlin Clark is the only woman to lead D-I in both points and assists, doing so in 2021–22 and 2023–24.

Schools are indicated with their current athletic brand names, which do not always match those used by a team in the relevant season.

| Season | Player | Pos. | Cl. | Team | Games played | Assists | APG | Ref. (Note: Except as noted, reference is to the list of single-season leaders on page 25 of the primary reference, the NCAA's 2021–22 Division Women's Basketball Records book.) |
|---|---|---|---|---|---|---|---|---|
| 1984–85 | Faith Mimnaugh | G | Sr | Loyola Chicago | 27 | 316 | 11.7 | |
| 1985–86 | Suzie McConnell | G | So | Penn State | 32 | 338 | 10.56 | |
| 1986–87 | Suzie McConnell (2) | G | Jr | Penn State | 30 | 355 | 11.83 | |
| 1987–88 | Neacole Hall | G | Jr | Alabama State | 28 | 318 | 11.36 | |
| 1988–89 | Neacole Hall (2) | G | Sr | Alabama State | 29 | 319 | 11 | |
| 1989–90 | Tine Freil | G | Fr | Pacific | 29 | 321 | 11.07 | |
| 1990–91 | Michelle Burden | G | Fr | Kent State | 29 | 294 | 10.14 | |
| 1991–92 | Mimi Harris | G | Sr | La Salle | 33 | 320 | 9.7 | |
| 1992–93 | Gaynor O'Donnell | G | Sr | East Carolina | 28 | 300 | 10.71 | |
| 1993–94 | Andrea Nagy | G | Jr | FIU | 29 | 298 | 10.28 | |
| 1994–95 | Andrea Nagy (2) | G | Sr | FIU | 32 | 315 | 9.84 | |
| 1995–96 | Brenda Pantoja | G | Sr | Arizona | 30 | 278 | 9.27 | |
| 1996–97 | Tamika Matlock | G | Sr | Michigan State | 30 | 229 | 7.63 | |
| 1997–98 | Dalma Iványi | G | Jr | FIU | 31 | 294 | 9.48 | |
| 1998–99 | Dalma Iványi (2) | G | Sr | FIU | 30 | 265 | 8.83 | |
| 1999–00 | Helen Darling | G | Sr | Penn State | 35 | 274 | 7.83 | |
| 2000–01 | Tasha Pointer | G | Sr | Rutgers | 31 | 257 | 8.29 | |
| 2001–02 | La’Terrica Dobin | G | So | Northwestern State | 29 | 250 | 8.62 | |
| 2002–03 | La’Terrica Dobin (2) | G | Jr | Northwestern State | 28 | 298 | 10.64 | |
| 2003–04 | La’Terrica Dobin (3) | G | Sr | Northwestern State | 26 | 249 | 9.58 | |
| 2004–05 | Yolanda Paige | G | Sr | West Virginia | 34 | 297 | 8.74 | |
| 2005–06 | Lyndsey Medders | G | Jr | Iowa State | 28 | 215 | 7.68 | |
| 2006–07 | Amanda Rego | G | Jr | San Diego | 30 | 230 | 7.67 | |
| 2007–08 | Claire Faucher | G | So | Portland State | 31 | 274 | 8.84 | |
| 2008–09 | Whitney Boddie | G | Sr | Auburn | 33 | 262 | 7.94 | |
| 2009–10 | Courtney Vandersloot | G | Jr | Gonzaga | 34 | 321 | 9.44 | |
| 2010–11 | Courtney Vandersloot (2) | G | Sr | Gonzaga | 36 | 367 | 10.19 | |
| 2011–12 | Angel Goodrich | G | Jr | Kansas | 34 | 250 | 7.35 | |
| 2012–13 | Kacie Cassell | G | Jr | Akron | 33 | 259 | 7.85 | |
| 2013–14 | Jamierra Faulkner | G | Sr | Southern Miss | 34 | 291 | 8.56 | |
| 2014–15 | Niya Johnson | G | Jr | Baylor | 36 | 322 | 8.94 | |
| 2015–16 | Niya Johnson (2) | G | Sr | Baylor | 37 | 321 | 8.68 | |
| 2016–17 | Curtyce Knox | G | Sr | Texas A&M | 34 | 304 | 8.94 | |
| 2017–18 | Tiana Mangakahia | G | So | Syracuse | 31 | 304 | 9.81 | |
| 2018–19 | Amy O'Neill | G | Sr | St. Francis Brooklyn | 31 | 268 | 8.65 | |
| 2019–20 | Sabrina Ionescu | G | Sr | Oregon | 33 | 299 | 9.06 | |
| 2020–21 (Note: Due to COVID-19 disruptions, the NCAA ruled that players would be eligible for season leaderboards if they played in at least 13 games that season, the same number required for a team to be considered for that season's NCAA rournament.) | Tiana Mangakahia (2) | G | Sr | Syracuse | 20 | 145 | 7.25 | |
| 2021–22 | Caitlin Clark | G | So | Iowa | 32 | 257 | 8.03 | |
| 2022–23 | Caitlin Clark (2) | G | Jr | Iowa | 38 | 327 | 8.61 | |
| 2023–24 | Caitlin Clark (3) | G | Sr | Iowa | 39 | 346 | 8.87 | |
| 2024–25 | Serena Sundell | G | Sr | Kansas State | 36 | 262 | 7.28 | |
| 2025–26 | Caroline Lau | G | Sr | Northwestern | 29 | 245 | 8.45 | |

== Multiple-time leaders ==
| Rank | Player | Team | Times leader | Years |
|---|---|---|---|---|
| 1 | Caitlin Clark | Iowa | 3 | 2021–22, 2022–23, 2023–24 |
| 1 | La’Terrica Dobin | Northwestern State | 3 | 2001–02, 2002–03, 2003–04 |
| 3 | Neacole Hall | Alabama State | 2 | 1987–88, 1988–89 |
| 3 | Dalma Iványi | FIU | 2 | 1997–98, 1998–99 |
| 3 | Niya Johnson | Baylor | 2 | 2014–15, 2015–16 |
| 3 | Tiana Mangakahia | Syracuse | 2 | 2017–18, 2020–21 |
| 3 | Suzie McConnell | Penn State | 2 | 1985–86, 1986–87 |
| 3 | Andrea Nagy | FIU | 2 | 1993–94, 1994–95 |
| 3 | Courtney Vandersloot | Gonzaga | 2 | 2009–10, 2010–11 |
