= Audrey Sauret =

French basketball player (born 1976)

Medal record

Women's basketball

Representing France

European Championships
Gold medal – first place	2001 France	Team
Silver medal – second place	1999 Poland	Team

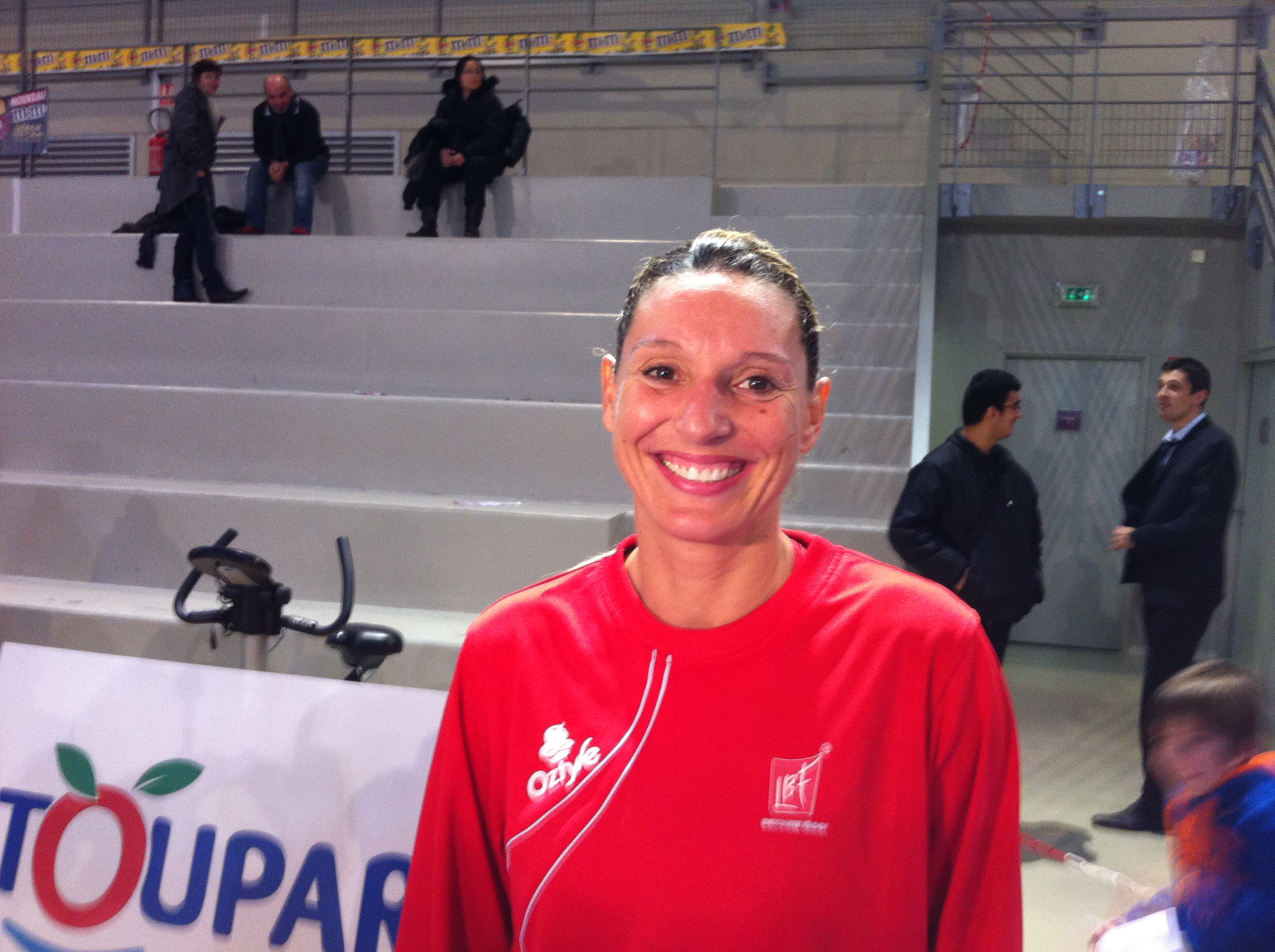
Portrait of Audrey Sauret

Audrey Sauret (born 31 October 1976 in Charleville-Mézières) is a French basketball player currently playing for Union Lyon BF. She has played the EuroLeague with Valenciennes Olympic, Bourges Basket, UMMC Ekaterinburg and Cras Basket Taranto. She also played in the WNBA for Washington Mystics. She was inducted into the French Basketball Hall of Fame in 2019.

She was a member of the French national team between 1994 and 2007, winning the 2001 EuroBasket. and was the team's captain in the 2006 World Championship.

== Club career ==
- (France) Valenciennes Olympic (1993–98, 2000–05), Bourges (1998–2000), Union Lyon (2011– )
- (United States) Washington Mystics (2001–02)
- (Russia) Ekaterinburg (2005–07)
- (Italy) Cras Taranto (2007–09), Schio (2009–10), Parma (2010–11)

== Career statistics ==
Legend
GP	Games played	GS	Games started	MPG	Minutes per game	RPG	Rebounds per game
APG	Assists per game	SPG	Steals per game	BPG	Blocks per game	PPG	Points per game
TO	Turnovers per game	FG%	Field-goal percentage	3P%	3-point field-goal percentage	FT%	Free-throw percentage
**Bold**	Career best	°	League leader

=== WNBA ===
WNBA regular season statistics
Year	Team	GP	GS	MPG	FG%	3P%	FT%	RPG	APG	SPG	BPG	TO	PPG
2001	Washington	**25**	**3**	**18.2**	.297	.115	.292	**1.7**	**1.7**	**1.0**	**0.2**	1.6	**3.0**
2002	Washington	15	2	11.0	**.417**	**.200**	**.600**	0.7	1.2	0.5	0.1	**1.0**	1.6
**Career**	2 years, 1 team	40	5	15.5	.319	.129	.345	1.3	1.5	0.8	0.2	1.4	2.5
