= Markita Aldridge =

American basketball player (born 1973)

Personal information
- Born: September 15, 1973 (age 53) Detroit, Michigan, U.S.
- Listed height: 5 ft 10 in (1.78 m)
- Listed weight: 153 lb (69 kg)

Career information
- High school: Martin Luther King (Detroit, Michigan)
- College: Charlotte (1991–1996)
- Position: Shooting guard
- Number: 12

Career history
- 1996–1997: Portland Power
- 1997–1998: Richmond Rage
- 1998: Columbus Quest
- 1999–2001: Washington Mystics
- Stats at WNBA.com
- Stats at Basketball Reference

Markita Uran Aldridge (born September 15, 1973) is an American former basketball shooting guard. Aldridge played three seasons with the Washington Mystics from 1999 to 2001. During her time with Washington, she averaged 2.3 points, one rebound, and one assist per game over 10.6 minutes.

Aldridge attended University of North Carolina at Charlotte, where she played with the 49ers. She graduated from Charlotte in 1996.

== Career statistics ==
Legend
GP	Games played	GS	Games started	MPG	Minutes per game	RPG	Rebounds per game
APG	Assists per game	SPG	Steals per game	BPG	Blocks per game	PPG	Points per game
TO	Turnovers per game	FG%	Field-goal percentage	3P%	3-point field-goal percentage	FT%	Free-throw percentage
**Bold**	Career best	°	League leader

=== WNBA ===
==== Regular season ====
Year	Team	GP	GS	MPG	FG%	3P%	FT%	RPG	APG	SPG	BPG	TO	PPG
1999	Washington	31	2	12.2	30.9	15.0	60.6	1.2	1.1	0.5	0.2	1.3	2.6
2000	Washington	29	0	9.4	46.3	50.0	31.8	0.8	1.0	0.3	0.1	0.9	2.2
2001	Washington	5	0	7.0	33.3	0.0	100.0	0.4	0.4	0.0	0.0	0.8	1.4
Career	3 years, 1 team	65	2	10.6	36.3	25.7	50.0	1.0	1.0	0.4	0.2	1.1	2.3

==== Playoffs ====
Year	Team	GP	GS	MPG	FG%	3P%	FT%	RPG	APG	SPG	BPG	TO	PPG
2000	Washington	2	0	24.5	45.5	0.0	50.0	2.0	3.5	0.5	0.0	0.5	7.0
Career	1 year, 1 team	2	0	24.5	45.5	0.0	50.0	2.0	3.5	0.5	0.0	0.5	7.0

=== College ===
Year	Team	GP	GS	MPG	FG%	3P%	FT%	RPG	APG	SPG	BPG	TO	PPG
1991–92	Charlotte	**28**	-	-	38.6	30.8	62.9	4.4	4.6	1.5	0.7	-	11.2
1992–93	Charlotte	Did not play due to injury											
1993–94	Charlotte	21	-	-	46.7	**31.4**	48.5	5.0	4.1	**2.3**	0.4	-	**15.3**
1994–95	Charlotte	26	-	-	**47.5**	14.3	58.8	**7.3**	3.7	1.4	1.0	-	**15.3**
1995–96	Charlotte	**28**	-	-	47.4	0.0	**67.9**	6.5	**4.6**	1.2	**1.3**	-	14.5
**Career**		103	-	-	45.2	26.4	60.2	5.8	4.3	1.6	0.9	-	14.0
Statistics retrieved from Sports-Reference.

== Personal life ==
In March 2017, Aldridge became the first former WNBA player appointed to the finance committee of the National Basketball Retired Players Association, which is the official alumni organization for multiple professional basketball leagues in the United States.
