= Helen Luz =

Brazilian basketball player (born 1972)

Helen Cristina Santos Luz
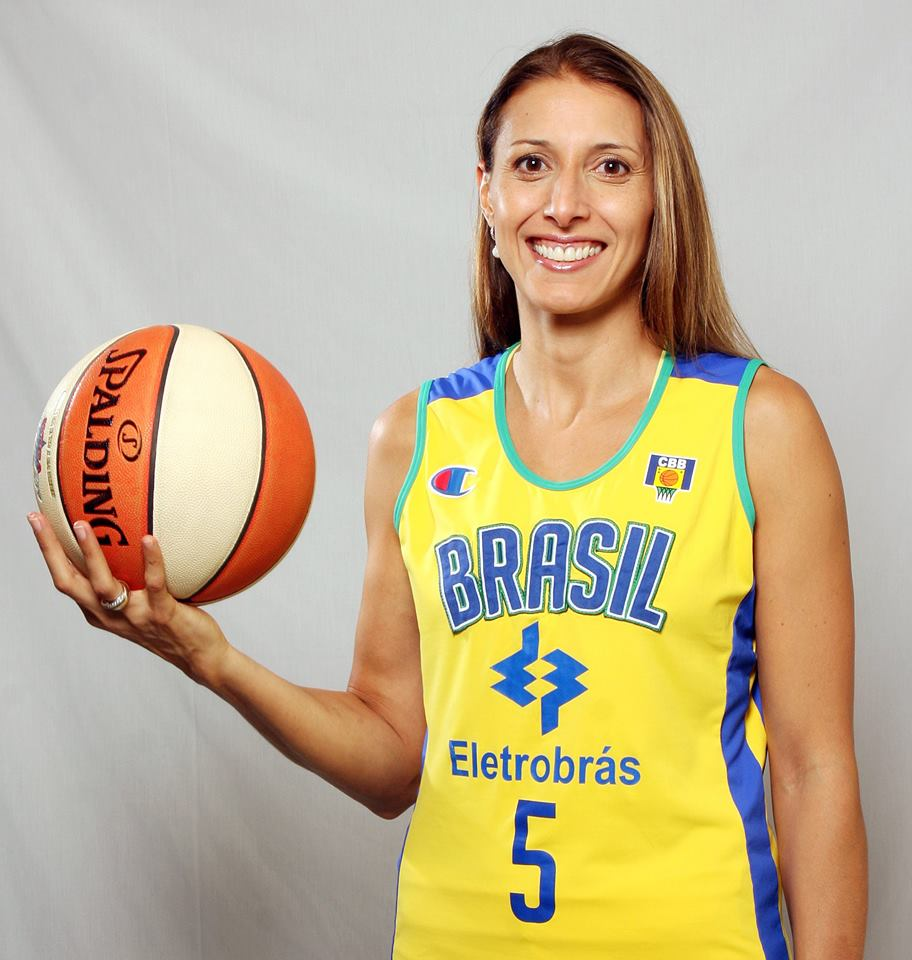

Personal information
- Born: November 23, 1972 (age 53) Araçatuba, Brazil
- Listed height: 5 ft 9 in (1.75 m)
- Listed weight: 144 lb (65 kg)
- Position: Point guard / shooting guard

Career history
- 2001–2003: Washington Mystics
- 2003: Zaragoza
- 2004: Novosibirsk
- 2004–2006: Barcelona
- 2006–2007: Rivas
- 2007–2008: Cadí La Seu
- 2008–2010: Hondarribia-Irun
- 2010–2011: Americana
- Stats at Basketball Reference
Medals
Representing Brazil
Olympic Games
Bronze medal – third place	2000 Sydney	Team Competition
World Championships
Gold medal – first place	Australia 1994	Team competition

Helen Cristina Santos Luz (born November 23, 1972, in Araçatuba, Brazil) is a retired Brazilian professional basketball player. A starting guard on the great Brazilian teams of the 1990s and early 2000s, she was world champion in the 1994 FIBA World Championship for Women and bronze medallist at the 2000 Summer Olympics. Luz also played for the Washington Mystics in the Women's National Basketball Association (WNBA) in 2001–2003, and in the Spanish Liga Femenina for Zaragoza (2003–2004), Barcelona (2004–2006), Rivas (2006–2007), Cadi La Seu (2007–2008), and Hondarribia-Irun (2008–2010). She finished her career in one final season with the Brazilian team Americana, in São Paulo State, announcing her retirement at the end of February 2011.

Since retiring, Helen has become a commentator on SporTV, opened (with her sisters) a social project for teaching basketball to children in Louveira, and begun a regular blog. In addition, she told interviewers that she hoped to become a mother, and on November 21, 2012, she and her husband Octavio welcomed into the world their son Pedro Lafiaccola Luz. Most recently she has become vice president of the Liga Basquete Feminino (the Women's Basketball League of Brazil), and has been invited to join the Commission for Women in Sport set up by the Brazilian Olympic Committee.

She is sister to three other basketballers, Silvia, Cintia and Rafael.

== Brazilian national team career ==
Helen played on the Brazilian women's national teams that competed in the Olympics in Barcelona in 1992 (7th place), Sydney in 2000 (bronze medal), and Athens in 2004 (4th place), and in the World Championships in Australia in 1994 (Gold medal), Germany in 1998 (4th place), China in 2002 (7th place), and Brazil in 2006 (4th place). Her teams were South American Champions in 1991, 1993, 1997, 1999, 2005, 2006 and 2010. She was MVP in the 2001 Copa América in Brazil and 2005 in Paraguay.

Helen retired from the national team after the 2006 World Championship games, but returned in 2009 to help lead the team to victory in the FIBA Americas Championship. In the four games of the tournament she led the Brazilian team in points per game (12.0, 10th in the tournament) and was second on the team in assists per game (3.6, 3rd in the tournament).

== WNBA career ==
Helen signed as a free agent with the Washington Mystics prior to the start of their 2001 training camp. She averaged 13.4 minutes per game over three seasons, usually coming off the bench as a 3-point specialist. She was a fan favorite for her enthusiasm and intelligent, unselfish play; the moment she stood up to approach the scorer's table, the MCI Center would resound with shouts of "Luz!" (A story in the Washington Post reported that she initially thought she was being booed, and wondered why.) She finished her WNBA career with a quite respectable .377 3-point shooting percentage -- .500 in four playoff games.

== Pro League career ==
Helen played in the Brazil Pro League from 1994 through 2002, with her clubs winning several championships. In 2004, she played with Novosibirsk in the Russian Pro League. From 2003 through 2010 she played in the Spanish Pro League, winning a championship with Barcelona in 2004–5 and Supercopa in 2005 before moving to Cadi in 2007 and then to Hondarribia-Irun in 2008.

== Career statistics ==
Legend
GP	Games played	GS	Games started	MPG	Minutes per game	RPG	Rebounds per game
APG	Assists per game	SPG	Steals per game	BPG	Blocks per game	PPG	Points per game
TO	Turnovers per game	FG%	Field-goal percentage	3P%	3-point field-goal percentage	FT%	Free-throw percentage
**Bold**	Career best	°	League leader

=== WNBA ===
==== Regular season ====
WNBA regular season statistics
Year	Team	GP	GS	MPG	FG%	3P%	FT%	RPG	APG	SPG	BPG	TO	PPG
2001	Washington	**32**	**3**	**15.3**	.404	.390	.880	**1.2**	**1.7**	**0.9**	**0.2**	1.3	5.1
2002	Washington	**32**	0	14.8	**.439**	**.396**	.789	1.0	1.5	0.6	**0.2**	1.3	**5.8**
2003	Washington	20	0	8.3	.358	.300	**.900**	0.5	1.1	0.3	0.1	**0.6**	3.0
**Career**	3 years, 1 team	84	3	13.4	.412	.377	.852	0.9	1.5	0.6	0.1	1.2	4.9

==== Playoffs ====
WNBA playoff statistics
Year	Team	GP	GS	MPG	FG%	3P%	FT%	RPG	APG	SPG	BPG	TO	PPG
2002	Washington	4	0	11.5	.583	.500	—	0.8	2.0	0.5	0.0	0.8	4.5
**Career**	1 year, 1 team	4	0	11.5	.583	.500	—	0.8	2.0	0.5	0.0	0.8	4.5
