= Annie La Fleur =

Australian-Papua New Guinean basketball player (born 1969)

Personal information
- Full name: Annie Lilian La Fleur
- Born: Annie Lilian Burgess; 3 November 1969 (age 56) Port Moresby, Territory of Papua, Australia
- Height: 1.67 m (5 ft 6 in)
- Weight: 62 kg (137 lb)

Sport
- Country: Australia
- Sport: Basketball
Medal record
World Championships
Bronze medal – third place	1998 Germany	Team competition
Olympic Games
Silver medal – second place	2000 Sydney	Team competition
World Junior Championships
Bronze medal – third place	1989 Spain	Team competition

Annie Lilian La Fleur (née Burgess, born 3 November 1969) is an Australian-Papua New Guinean former basketball player who competed in the 2000 Summer Olympics and the WNBA from 1999 to 2003. She also played for the Sydney Flames in the WNBL, the Australian domestic competition.

== WNBA career statistics ==
Legend
GP	Games played	GS	Games started	MPG	Minutes per game	RPG	Rebounds per game
APG	Assists per game	SPG	Steals per game	BPG	Blocks per game	PPG	Points per game
TO	Turnovers per game	FG%	Field-goal percentage	3P%	3-point field-goal percentage	FT%	Free-throw percentage
**Bold**	Career best	°	League leader

=== Regular season ===
Year	Team	GP	GS	MPG	FG%	3P%	FT%	RPG	APG	SPG	BPG	TO	PPG
1999	Minnesota	25	0	13.3	.343	**.440**	.250	1.5	1.4	0.3	0.0	0.9	2.4
2001	Washington	31	27	23.6	.333	.298	.593	**2.5**	2.8	0.8	0.1	1.9	4.0
2002	Washington	26	26	24.3	**.386**	.364	**.778**	2.4	**3.6**	**1.3**	**0.2**	1.6	**4.8**
2003	Washington	**34**	**33**	**24.7**	.373	.276	.600	2.3	3.3	0.8	0.0	1.5	3.9
Career	4 years, 2 teams	116	86	21.9	.359	.325	.648	2.2	2.8	0.8	0.1	1.5	3.8

=== Playoffs ===
Year	Team	GP	GS	MPG	FG%	3P%	FT%	RPG	APG	SPG	BPG	TO	PPG
2002	Washington	5	5	32.0	.379	.250	.667	3.0	5.4	0.4	0.0	2.0	6.0
Career	1 years, 1 team	5	5	32.0	.379	.250	.667	3.0	5.4	0.4	0.0	2.0	6.0

== See also ==
- List of Australian WNBA players
