= Dalma Iványi =

Hungarian basketball player (born 1976)

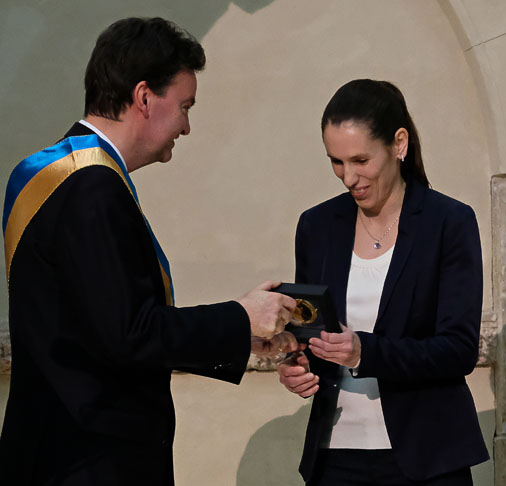
- Iványi (right) receiving Tüke medal in 2018

Personal information
- Born: March 18, 1976 (age 50) Békéscsaba, Hungarian People's Republic
- Listed height: 5 ft 10 in (1.78 m)
- Listed weight: 135 lb (61 kg)

Career information
- College: FIU (1995–1999)
- WNBA draft: 1999: 4th round, 37th overall pick
- Drafted by: Utah Starzz
- Playing career: 1994–2014
- Position: Guard
- Number: 8

Career history

Playing
- 1994–2011: Mizo Pécs 2010
- 1999–2000: Utah Starzz
- 2003: Phoenix Mercury
- 2004–2006: San Antonio Silver Stars
- 2012: Botaşspor
- 2012–2014: PINKK-Pécsi 424

Coaching
- 2019–2020: PINKK-Pécsi 424
- 2020–: UNI Győr

Career highlights
- 2× NCAA season assists leader (1998, 1999); Third-team All-American – AP (1999); Sun Belt Defensive Player of the Year (1999); A-Sun Player of the Year (1998); All-Sun Belt (1999); First-team All-A-Sun (1998)
- Stats at Basketball Reference

Dalma Iványi (born March 18, 1976) (Note: Some sources give her birth date as March 13, 1976.) is a Hungarian basketball player and coach, who played as a guard. She won 10 Nemzeti Bajnokság I/A Championships with Mizo Pécs 2010 and PINKK-Pécsi 424. She also played for Utah Starzz, Phoenix Mercury, and San Antonio Silver Stars in the American Women's National Basketball Association. Iványi is the current coach of Hungarian club UNI Győr.

== Personal life ==
Iványi was born on March 18, 1976, in Békéscsaba, Hungarian People's Republic (now Hungary). She started playing basketball at the age of 5 in Mezőberény. Her husband is Bulgarian, and they have two children.

== Club career ==
Iványi played as a guard. Iványi started out as a youth player at Pécs 2010 (PVSK), the women's basketball team in Pécs, Hungary. She was a captain of the youth team, before being promoted to the senior team in 1994. In the final game of her first season, Iványi scored 22 points, as PVSK won the Nemzeti Bajnokság I/A. She also played for PINKK-Pécsi 424. During her career, Iványi won 10 Hungarian Championships, including nine with Pécs 2010 between 1994 and 2011.

In the US, Iványi played college basketball for Florida International University (FIU), before graduating from FIU in 1999. She played for four years at FIU, and averaged 14.1 points, 4.8 rebounds, 8.5 assists and 3.6 steals per game. In her sophomore year, Iványi was one of seven non-American players in the FIU team. In the 1997 season, Iványi had the most assists in the league.

Iványi was drafted by the Utah Starzz in the fourth round of the 1999 Women's National Basketball Association draft. Fellow Hungarian Andrea Nagy was also drafted, and Iványi was one of 12 college basketball players selected in the draft. Iványi played in the WNBA between 1999 and 2006. Between 1999 and 2000 she played for the Utah Starzz, and she did not play in the WNBA in the 2001 season, due to her commitments in the Hungarian league. In 2003, she played for Phoenix Mercury, and from 2004 to 2006 she played for San Antonio Silver Stars. Whilst with the Stars, she shared a car with Polish player Agnieszka Bibrzycka.

== International career ==
Iványi played internationally for Hungary over 130 times. She represented them in four EuroBasket Women tournaments, and one FIBA Women's Basketball World Cup, winning two EuroBasket bronze medals.

== Coaching career ==
After retiring, Iványi became youth coach of PINKK-Pécsi 424. In April 2020, she announced a move to UNI Győr, to start coaching there from July 1, 2020. From 2022 she is the assistant coach for NKA Universitas Pécs.

== Career statistics ==
Legend
GP	Games played	GS	Games started	MPG	Minutes per game	FG%	Field goal percentage	3P%	3-point field goal percentage
FT%	Free throw percentage	RPG	Rebounds per game	APG	Assists per game	SPG	Steals per game	BPG	Blocks per game
TO	Turnovers per game	PPG	Points per game	**Bold**	Career high		Data not available	*	Led Division I

=== College ===
Year	Team	GP	GS	MPG	FG%	3P%	FT%	RPG	APG	SPG	BPG	TO	PPG
1995–96	FIU	28	-	-	41.2	26.9	75.7	**5.6**	6.6	**4.1**	**0.1**	-	14.2
1996–97	FIU	17	-	-	40.0	37.0	78.7	4.5	8.9	3.1	**0.1**	-	11.6
1997–98	FIU	**31**	-	-	**47.2**	32.1	78.9	5.1	***9.5**	3.4	0.0	-	14.6
1998–99	FIU	30	-	-	43.1	**40.6**	**86.6**	3.8	*8.8	3.4	**0.1**	-	**15.0**
**Career**		106	-	-	43.3	34.6	80.3	4.8	8.5	3.5	0.1	-	14.1
Statistics retrieved from Sports-Reference.
