= Tausha Mills =

American basketball player (born 1976)

Personal information
- Born: February 29, 1976 (age 50) Dallas, Texas, U.S.
- Listed height: 6 ft 3 in (1.91 m)
- Listed weight: 231 lb (105 kg)

Career information
- High school: Lakeview Centennial (Garland, Texas)
- College: Trinity Valley CC (1994–1996); Alabama (1996–1998)
- WNBA draft: 2000: 1st round, 2nd overall pick
- Drafted by: Washington Mystics
- Playing career: 1998–2008
- Position: Center

Career history
- 1998: Chicago Condors
- 2000–2002: Washington Mystics
- 2003: San Antonio Silver Stars
- 2007: Detroit Shock
- 2007: CCC Polkowice
- 2007: H.Haifa
- 2007–2008: Erdemir
- Stats at Basketball Reference

NarTausha Annette "Tausha" Mills (born February 29, 1976) is a former professional basketball player who played on multiple teams in the WNBA.

She played a total of 99 games.

== Career statistics ==
Legend
GP	Games played	GS	Games started	MPG	Minutes per game	RPG	Rebounds per game
APG	Assists per game	SPG	Steals per game	BPG	Blocks per game	PPG	Points per game
TO	Turnovers per game	FG%	Field-goal percentage	3P%	3-point field-goal percentage	FT%	Free-throw percentage
**Bold**	Career best	°	League leader

=== College ===
Year	Team	GP	Points	FG%	3P%	FT%	RPG	APG	PPG
1996–97	Alabama	30	233	.470	.000	.551	4.8	0.2	7.8
1997–98	Alabama	34	419	.512	.000	.549	7.1	0.4	12.3
TOTAL		64	590	.497	.000	.550	6.0	0.3	10.2

=== Regular season ===
Year	Team	GP	GS	MPG	FG%	3P%	FT%	RPG	APG	SPG	BPG	TO	PPG
2000	Washington	**31**	0	9.5	**.438**	.000	.745	2.6	0.3	0.3	**0.3**	1.2	**4.2**
2001	Washington	30	0	**10.6**	.333	.000	.581	**3.5**	0.2	**0.5**	0.1	0.8	2.1
2002	Washington	4	0	4.3	.000	.000	.000	0.8	0.0	0.3	0.0	**0.5**	0.0
2003	San Antonio	29	0	6.4	.408	.000	.581	1.9	0.2	0.1	0.1	1.8	2.0
2007	Detroit	5	**1**	10.2	.286	.000	**.750**	3.6	**0.4**	0.0	0.0	1.2	3.0
Career	5 years, 3 teams	99	1	8.8	.383	.000	.647	2.6	0.2	0.3	0.1	0.9	2.7

=== Playoffs ===
Year	Team	GP	GS	MPG	FG%	3P%	FT%	RPG	APG	SPG	BPG	TO	PPG
2000	Washington	2	0	10.5	.571	.000	.375	1.5	0.0	0.0	0.0	1.5	5.5
