= Keisha Anderson =

American basketball player (born 1974)

Personal information
- Born: May 8, 1974 (age 52) Racine, Wisconsin, U.S.
- Listed height: 5 ft 7 in (1.70 m)
- Listed weight: 160 lb (73 kg)

Career information
- High school: Washington Park (Racine, Wisconsin)
- College: Arizona (1992–1993); Wisconsin (1994–1997)
- Position: Guard

Career highlights
- First-team All-Big Ten (1997); Wisconsin Miss Basketball (1992)
- Stats at Basketball Reference

Keisha Anderson is an American basketball player. As a high school senior at Park High School in Racine, Wisconsin she received Wisconsin Miss Basketball and Parade All American honors.

Anderson received a full basketball scholarship to the University of Arizona during 1992-93 and was selected to the all-freshman Pac 10 team. She transferred to University of Wisconsin. Moving from the all-freshman Pac 10 team to First Team All Big 10, she became Wisconsin's eighth all-time in scoring, second all-time in assists and first in all-time steals.

Her continued efforts received District IV First team All American and Wisconsin MVP in 1997.

During 1997 she also finished her bachelor's degree in criminal justice, along with being a proud 16th overall draft pick to join the American Basketball League's Colorado Xplosion. The ABL came to an ultimate demise, and she went abroad taking her career to Team Elitzur in Holon Israel. Traveling back to the United States, she was drafted by the Women’s National Basketball League's Atlanta Justice, becoming a part of the team's success winning the championship during 2000–2001. After the championship, Anderson was picked up as a free agent by the WNBA’s Washington Mystics in 2004.

When the WNBA season ended she continued to play professional basketball with Dallas Fury during the fall of 2004–2005. During the following WNBA season Anderson was traded to the Charlotte Sting, where she played two seasons. During the fall 2005–2007 season she played with the Chicago Blaze, ending her professional basketball career overseas with team Istanbul University, in Istanbul Turkey.

Anderson received one of basketball's greatest honors, being inducted into the Racine, Wisconsin Hall of Fame on October, 25th 2012. The following year she was inducted into the Wisconsin Basketball Coaches Hall of Fame on October 5, 2013.

Anderson retired her high school jersey at Park High School on February 3, 2017.

She later co-founded Fire N Ice professional basketball skills training.

== Career statistics ==
Legend
GP	Games played	GS	Games started	MPG	Minutes per game	RPG	Rebounds per game
APG	Assists per game	SPG	Steals per game	BPG	Blocks per game	PPG	Points per game
TO	Turnovers per game	FG%	Field-goal percentage	3P%	3-point field-goal percentage	FT%	Free-throw percentage
**Bold**	Career best	°	League leader

=== WNBA ===
==== Regular season ====
Year	Team	GP	GS	MPG	FG%	3P%	FT%	RPG	APG	SPG	BPG	TO	PPG
2000	Washington	**30**	**9**	**14.5**	**42.6**	**37.5**	77.8	**1.5**	**2.5**	**0.8**	**0.1**	1.6	**2.5**
2001	Charlotte	18	0	5.7	12.5	0.0	**80.0**	0.8	0.8	0.3	0.0	0.9	0.7
2002	Charlotte	7	0	4.4	25.0	25.0	0.0	0.9	0.7	0.0	0.0	**0.4**	1.0
Career	3 years, 2 teams	55	9	10.3	35.4	28.6	78.6	1.2	1.7	0.6	0.1	1.2	1.7

==== Playoffs ====
Year	Team	GP	GS	MPG	FG%	3P%	FT%	RPG	APG	SPG	BPG	TO	PPG
2000	Washington	2	**2**	**15.0**	**33.3**	0.0	0.0	**2.5**	**2.5**	0.0	0.0	2.0	**1.0**
2001	Charlotte	2	0	3.5	0.0	0.0	0.0	0.0	0.5	**0.5**	0.0	**0.5**	0.0
Career	2 years, 2 teams	4	2	9.3	25.0	0.0	33.3	1.3	1.5	0.3	0.0	1.3	0.5

=== College ===
Year	Team	GP	GS	MPG	FG%	3P%	FT%	RPG	APG	SPG	BPG	TO	PPG
1992–93	Arizona	27	-	-	40.0	30.0	**75.0**	4.0	4.8	3.2	0.1	-	11.5
1993–94	Wisconsin	Did not play due to injury											
1994–95	Wisconsin	**29**	-	-	42.6	24.6	69.0	**4.6**	5.3	3.8	0.2	-	13.1
1995–96	Wisconsin	**29**	-	-	41.8	41.7	74.4	3.9	**6.7**	**4.3**	0.0	-	12.7
1996–97	Wisconsin	27	-	-	**50.5**	**44.4**	71.4	3.5	4.6	3.5	**0.3**	-	**19.7**
**Career**		112	-	-	44.2	31.2	72.3	4.0	5.4	3.7	0.2	-	14.2
Statistics retrieved from Sports-Reference.
