= Tonya Washington =

American basketball player (born 1977)

Personal information
- Born: December 30, 1977 (age 48)
- Listed height: 6 ft 0 in (1.83 m)

Career information
- High school: Paxton (Paxton, Florida)
- College: Florida (1997–2000)
- WNBA draft: 2000: 2nd round, 18th overall pick
- Drafted by: Washington Mystics
- Playing career: 2000–2003
- Position: Forward
- Number: 4

Career history
- 2000–2003: Washington Mystics
- 2003: Seattle Storm

Career highlights
- First-team All-SEC (2000); Second-team All-SEC (1999)
- Stats at Basketball Reference

Tonya Massaline (born December 30, 1977), née Tonya Washington, is an American former professional basketball player who was a forward in the Women's National Basketball Association (WNBA) for four seasons.

Washington accepted an athletic scholarship to attend the University of Florida in Gainesville, Florida, where she played for coach Carol Ross's Florida Gators women's basketball team from 1997 to 2000. She did not play during her 1996–97 freshman season, but she excelled thereafter, receiving All-Southeastern Conference (SEC) honors in 1999 and 2000. She graduated from the University of Florida with a bachelor's degree in 2000.

The Washington Mystics selected Washington in the second round, with the eighteenth overall pick, of the 2000 WNBA draft. She played for the Mystics for three and a half seasons from 2000 to 2003, and finished her fourth season with the Seattle Storm during the second half of 2003. She played in 98 regular season games, mostly in reserve, during her WNBA pro career.

== Early life ==
Tonya Massaline has an explosive first step, creates her own shots, and can shoot off enthusiastic dribble plays on the court. Massaline is considered very versatile player who can play the perimeter on the paint and is a scoring talent. She sports one of the best vertical jump and broad jump on the team has a strong one-on-one game and drives aggressively to the hole. Nicknamed "LT" by her teammates, taking the first and third letters of her given name: Latonya was invited at the USA Basketball tryouts: invited to tryout for the 1999 World University Games team, but underwent an emergency appendectomy days before the event began. Massaline earned a spot on the 1998 USA Jones Cup Team but could not accept the position due to an academic conflict on target to graduate with an undergraduate degree in Recreation - Program Delivery in August 2000. When she would have had the option of retaining a fourth year of college eligibility after having sat out as a freshman due to NCAA rules (She was a partial qualifier her freshman season and was forced by the NCAA to sit out the year). However, she decided to forego a fourth year of eligibility to pursue a professional basketball career.... on April 25, 2000, Massaline became the 18th overall selection in the 2000 WNBA draft, picked by Washington as the 2nd selection in the second round.

== Florida statistics ==
Legend
GP	Games played	GS	Games started	MPG	Minutes per game
FG%	Field goal percentage	3P%	3-point field goal percentage	FT%	Free throw percentage
RPG	Rebounds per game	APG	Assists per game	SPG	Steals per game
BPG	Blocks per game	PPG	Points per game	**Bold**	Career high

Year	Team	GP	Points	FG%	3P%	FT%	RPG	APG	SPG	BPG	PPG
1997-98	Florida	32	349	47.8%	33.3%	62.0%	5.4	1.1	0.8	0.3	10.9
1998-99	Florida	28	468	**48.7%**	**40.7%**	69.0%	8.3	1.4	1.0	**0.6**	16.7
1999-00	Florida	**34**	**631**	43.0%	34.0%	**70.8%**	6.9	**1.9**	1.5	0.5	**18.6**
TOTALS	Florida	94	1448	45.9%	36.0%	67.2%	6.8	1.5	1.1	0.2	15.4

== See also ==
- List of Florida Gators in the WNBA
- List of University of Florida alumni
