= List of Florida Gators in the WNBA =

This list of Florida Gators basketball players in WNBA includes former members of the Florida Gators women's basketball team that represents the University of Florida who have played professionally for a Women's National Basketball Association (WNBA) team in one or more regular season games. This list includes former Florida Gators women's basketball players who are retired or currently active WNBA professionals.

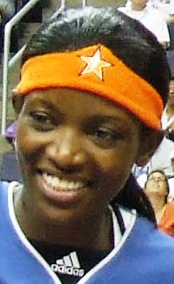
DeLisha Milton-Jones

Athlete	Notability
Vanessa Hayden	Former WNBA center for the Minnesota Lynx (2004–2008) and Los Angeles Sparks (2009)
Aneika Henry	Current WNBA forward for the Atlanta Dream (2012–present)
Tammy Jackson	Former WNBA center for the Houston Comets (1997–1998, 1999–2002) and Washington Mystics (1998); WNBA champion (1997); Olympic bronze medalist (1992)
Merlakia Jones	Former WNBA guard for the Cleveland Rockers (1997–2003) and Detroit Shock (2004)
Brandi McCain	Former WNBA guard for the Cleveland Rockers (2002)
DeLisha Milton-Jones	Current WNBA forward for the Los Angeles Sparks (1999–2004, 2008– ), and formerly the Washington Mystics (2005–2007); WNBA champion (2002, 2002); Olympic gold medalist (2000, 2008)
Murriel Page	Former WNBA forward and center for the Washington Mystics (1998–2006) and Los Angeles Sparks (2006–2009)
Bridget Pettis	Former WNBA guard for the Phoenix Mercury (1997–2001) and Indiana Fever (2002–2003); current assistant coach for the Phoenix Mercury
Tamara Stocks	Former WNBA forward and center for the Washington Mystics (2001)
Tiffany Travis	Former WNBA guard for Charlotte Sting (2000)
Tonya Washington	Former WNBA forward for the Washington Mystics (2000–2003) and Seattle Storm (2003)
Sophia Witherspoon	Former WNBA guard for the New York Liberty (1997–1999), Portland Fire (2000–2001) and Los Angeles Sparks (2002–2003)

== See also ==
- List of Florida Gators men's basketball players in the NBA
- List of University of Florida alumni
- List of University of Florida Athletic Hall of Fame members
- List of University of Florida Olympians
