= List of Florida Gators in the NBA =

This list of Florida Gators men's basketball players in the NBA includes those former Florida Gators who have played in one or more regular season games of the National Basketball Association (NBA). The team was founded in 1915, and represents the university in intercollegiate competition. The University of Florida is a member of the National Collegiate Athletic Association (NCAA) and Southeastern Conference (SEC). The Gators have won three NCAA Men's Division I Basketball Championships in 2006, 2007, and 2025. After their college careers, several former Gators have played professionally in the NBA. As of the conclusion of the 2020–21 NBA season, 33 former Florida players have played in the NBA or its predecessor American Basketball Association (ABA).

Eleven former Florida players have won the NBA Championships. Vernon Maxwell won the title twice with the Houston Rockets in 1994 and 1995. Udonis Haslem and Jason Williams were part of the Miami Heat starting lineup that won the 2006 NBA title. In 2007, Matt Bonner and James White won the NBA title with the San Antonio Spurs, although White did not play any game in the playoffs. Two-time NCAA champion Corey Brewer won the 2011 NBA title with the Dallas Mavericks. Mike Miller won titles in 2012 and 2013 with the Miami Heat alongside Haslem, and David Lee and Marreese Speights won a title in 2015 with the Golden State Warriors. Chris Chiozza won a title in 2022 with the Golden State Warriors. Al Horford won a title in 2024 with the Boston Celtics.

In the 2007 NBA draft, Al Horford, Corey Brewer, and Joakim Noah were selected with the third, seventh and ninth picks respectively. This marked the first time three players drafted in the top 10 came from the same school. Two other players, Taurean Green, and Chris Richard, were selected in the second round.

== List ==
Pos	G	Guard	F	Forward	C	Center
Yrs	Number of seasons played with the Florida Gators or in the NBA					
^	Denotes player who is still active in the NBA					
†	Denotes player who transferred from Florida to another school before entering the NBA					

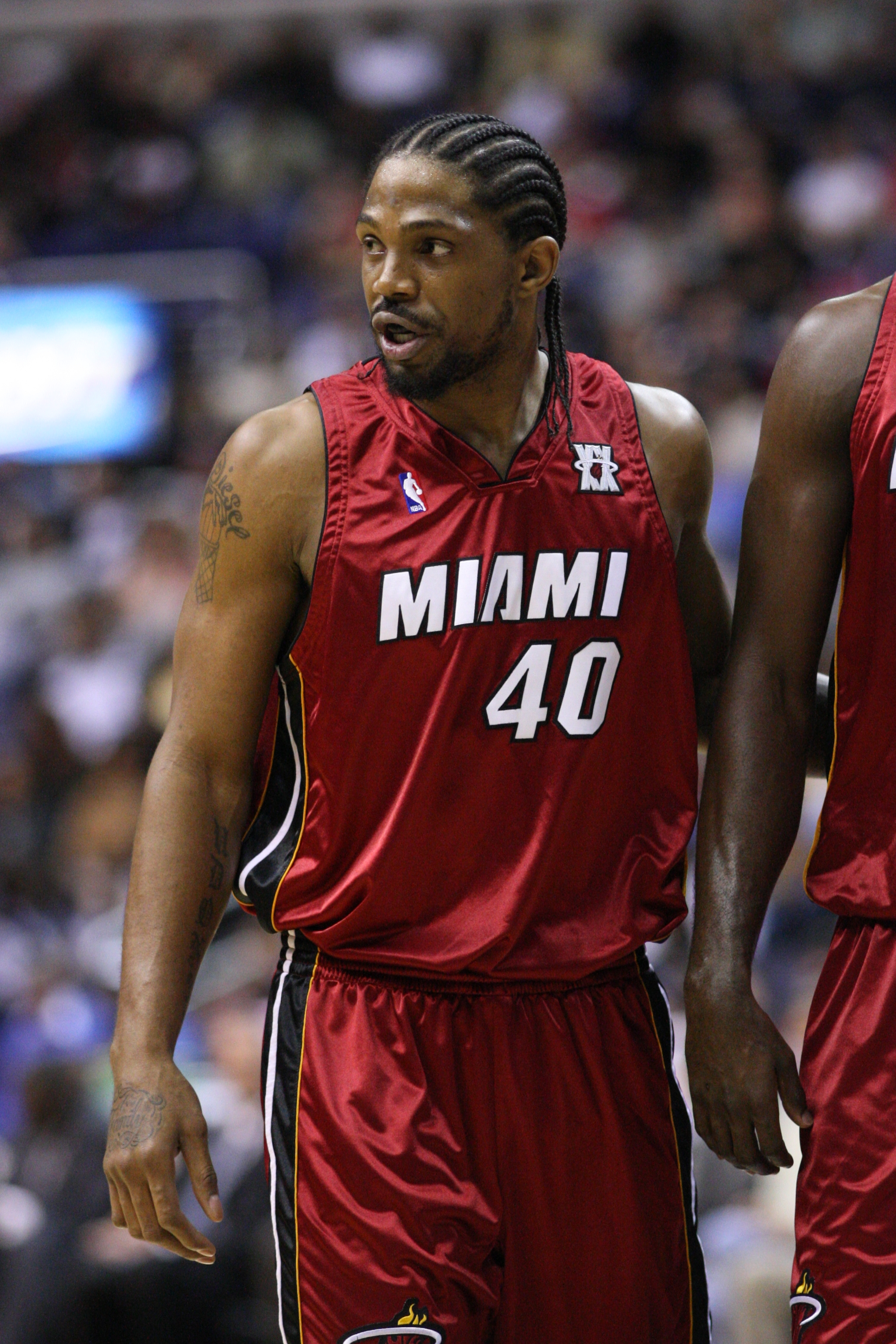
Udonis Haslem

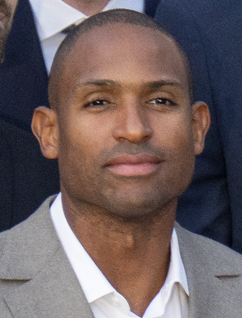
Al Horford

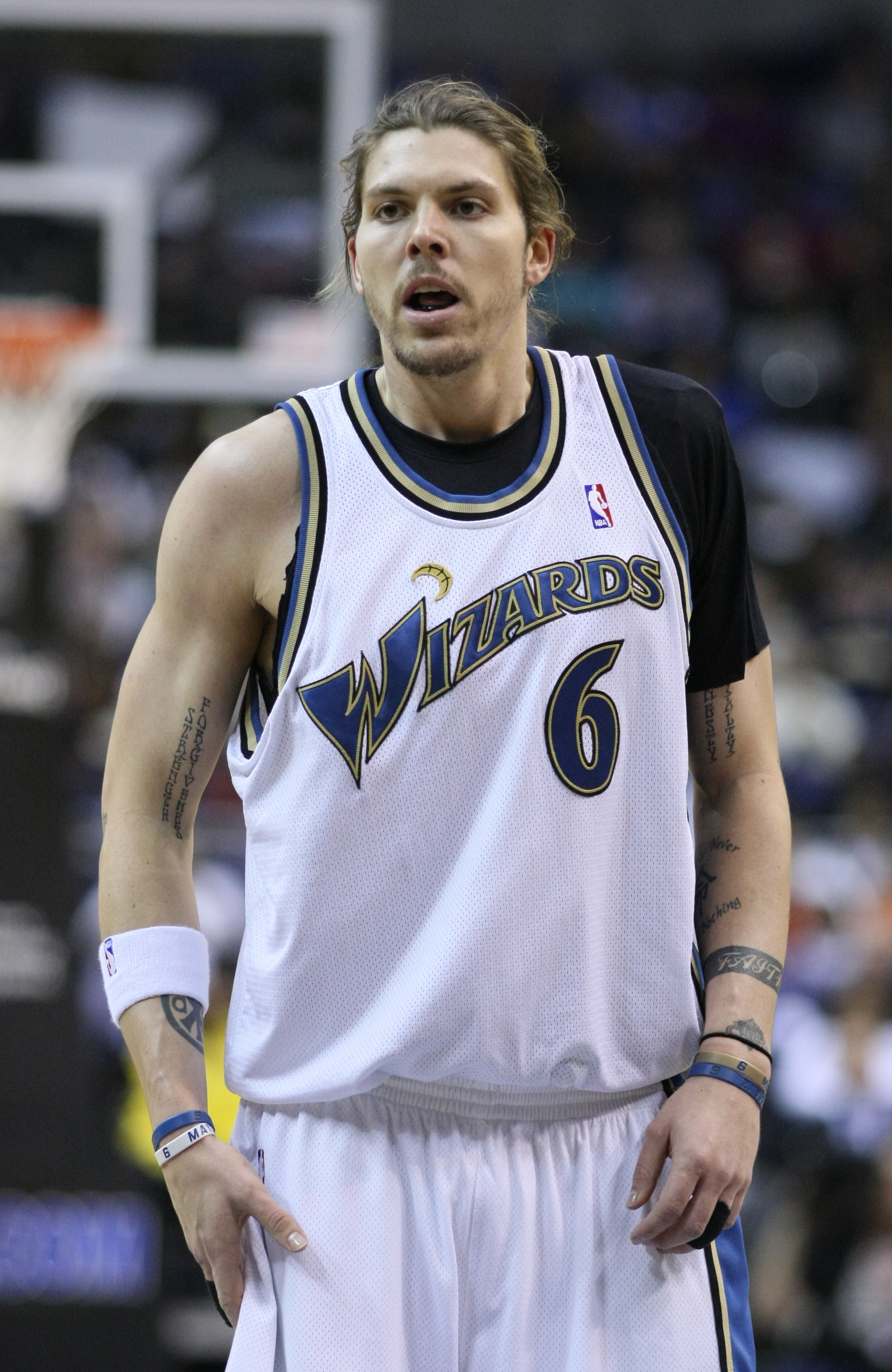
Mike Miller

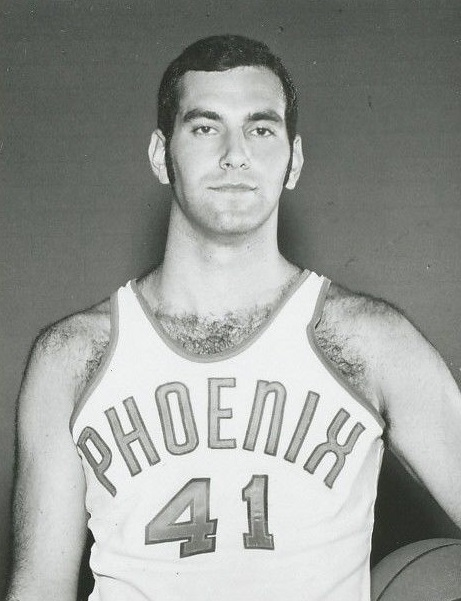
Neal Walk

Player	Pos	Career	Yrs	Career	Yrs	Draft	Round	Pick	NBA achievements	Ref
Player	Pos	Florida		NBA		NBA draft			NBA achievements	Ref
Bradley Beal^	G	2011–2012	1	2012–present	12	2012	1	3	• 3× NBA All-Star (2018, 2019, 2021) • All-NBA Third Team (2021) • NBA All-Rookie First Team (2013)	
Matt Bonner	F	1999–2003	4	2004–2017	12	2003	2	45	• 2x NBA Champion (2007, 2014)	
Corey Brewer	F	2004–2007	3	2007–2020	13	2007	1	7	• NBA Champion (2011)	
Nick Calathes	G	2007–2009	2	2013–2015	2	2009	2	45		
Chris Chiozza	G	2014–2018	4	2019–2022	3	2018	–	– (Note: These players was not drafted by any team on the year they were eligible for the draft.)	• NBA Champion (2022)	
Andrew DeClercq	F/C	1991–1995	4	1996–2005	10	1995	2	34		
Dorian Finney-Smith^	F	2013–2016	3	2016–present	8	2016	–	–		
Michael Frazier II	G	2012–2015	3	2020	1	2015	–	–		
Jim Grandholm	F	1979–1980†	1	1990–1991	1	1984	4	76		
Taurean Green	G	2004–2007	3	2007–2008	1	2007	2	52		
Orien Greene	G	2000–2002†	2	2005–2007, 2011	4	2005	2	53		
Donnell Harvey	F	1999–2000	1	2000–2004, 2005	5	2000	1	22		
Udonis Haslem	F	1998–2002	4	2003–2023	20	2002	–	–	• 3x NBA Champion (2006, 2012, 2013) • NBA All-Rookie Second Team (2004)	
Al Horford^	C	2004–2007	3	2007–present	17	2007	1	3	• 5× NBA All-Star (2010, 2011, 2015, 2016, 2018) • All-NBA Third Team (2011) • NBA Champion (2024) • NBA All-Rookie Second Team (2008) • NBA All-Defensive Second Team (2018)	
Gary Keller	F/C	1963–1967	4	1967–1969 (Note: These players played in the American Basketball Association (ABA) before the ABA–NBA merger in 1976)	2	1967	6	59		
David Lee	F	2001–2005	4	2005–2017	12	2005	1	30	• 2x NBA All-Star (2010, 2013) • All-NBA Third Team (2013) • NBA Champion (2015)	
Clifford Lett	G	1985–1989	4	1990, 1991	1	1989	–	–		
Scottie Lewis^	G	2019–2021	2	2021–2022	0	2021	2	56		
Vernon Macklin	F	2009–2011	2	2011–2012	1	2011	2	52		
Tre Mann^	G	2019–2021	2	2021–present	3	2021	1	18		
Vernon Maxwell	G	1984–1988	4	1988–2001	13	1988	2	47	• 2× NBA Champion (1994, 1995)	
Mike Miller	F	1998–2000	2	2000–2017	17	2000	1	5	• 2x NBA Champion (2012, 2013) • NBA Sixth Man of the Year (2006) • NBA Rookie of the Year (2001) • NBA All-Rookie First Team (2001)	
Erik Murphy	F	2009–2013	4	2013–2014	2	2013	2	49		
Joakim Noah	C	2004–2007	3	2007–2020	13	2007	1	9	• 2x NBA All-Star (2013, 2014) • All-NBA First Team (2014) • NBA Defensive Player of the Year (2014) • 2x NBA All-Defensive First Team (2013, (2014) • NBA All-Defensive Second Team (2011) • J. Walter Kennedy Citizenship Award (2015)	
Chandler Parsons	F	2007–2011	4	2011–2019	9	2011	2	38	• NBA All-Rookie Second Team (2012)	
Rich Peek	C	1963–1964†	2	1967–1968	1	1967	15	148		
Chris Richard	F	2003–2007	4	2007–2008, 2010	2	2007	2	41		
Anthony Roberson	G	2002–2005	3	2005–2006, 2008–2009	3	2005	–	–		
Devin Robinson	F	2014–2017	3	2018–2019	2	2017	–	–		
Dwayne Schintzius	C	1986–1990	4	1990–1997, 1999	8	1988	1	24		
Marreese Speights	F	2006–2008	2	2008–2018	10	2008	1	16	• NBA Champion (2015)	
Neal Walk	C	1966–1969	3	1969–1976	8	1969	1	2		
Matt Walsh	G/F	2002–2005	3	2005	1	2005	–	–		
James White	G/F	2001–2002†	1	2006–2007, 2009, 2013–2014	3	2006	2	31	• NBA Champion (2007)	
Jason Williams	G	1997–1998	1	1998–2008, 2009–2011	12	1998	1	7	• NBA Champion (2006) • NBA All-Rookie First Team (1999)	

== See also ==
- List of Florida Gators in the WNBA
- List of University of Florida alumni
- List of University of Florida Athletic Hall of Fame members
