= Andrea Nagy =

Hungarian basketball player (born 1971)

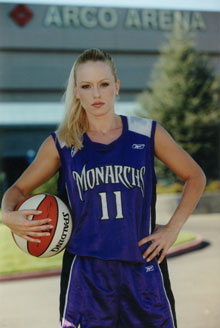

Personal information
- Born: November 16, 1971 (age 53); Budapest, Hungary

Career information
- College: Florida International University (1991–1995)
- WNBA draft: 1999: 3rd round, 1st overall pick
- Drafted by: Washington Mystics

Career history
- 1999–2000: Washington Mystics
- 2001: New York Liberty
- 2002: Sacramento Monarchs

Career highlights
- Third-team All-American – AP (1995); Kodak All-American (1994); 2x All-American – USBWA (1994, 1995); TAAC Player of the Year (1994); 4x First-team All-TAAC (1992–1995); 2x NCAA season assists leader (1994, 1995)
- Stats at Basketball Reference

Andrea Nagy (born November 16, 1971) is a retired professional basketball player. After a stand-out career playing at Florida International University, Nagy was drafted into the ABL before finishing her career in the WNBA playing as a point guard.

== College ==
Nagy attended Florida International University (FIU), where she played from 1991 to 1995. She is considered one of the greatest players in the school's history, and one of three players with a jersey retired by the Panthers. She helped FIU to two NCAA Tournament appearances, and finished with career averages of 14.5 points, 3.6 rebounds, and 9.4 assists – the fourth-best assist average in NCAA history.

Her 1,165 assists are the second best in NCAA history and an FIU record. Nagy ranks fourth in school history, with 1,812 career points. She led the nation in 1994 with 10.3 assists per game and was selected first-team All-America by Kodak, the United States Basketball Writers' Association, and USA Today. Named to the Atlantic Sun Conference's 25th Anniversary Team, she is one of five former players and coaches inducted into the inaugural class of the FIU Hall of Fame on November 17, 2006.

== Professional ==
In 1996, Seattle selected Nagy in the fourth round of the ABL Draft. She played in 39 games and finished second on the team in assists (113), fifth in steals (34), and ninth in scoring (3.8). In 1997, she played for Long Beach, leading the Stingrays to the finals. She finished third in the league in assists (273) and averaged 7.6 points per game.

Nagy was selected by the Washington Mystics in the third round (25th overall) of the 1999 WNBA draft. In two seasons with the Washington Mystics, she started every game she played. Highlights of the 2000 season were ten-assist performances against Sacramento and a fifth-place finish in assists (118). She started 23 games, averaging 4.2 points, 2.7 rebounds, and 5.1 assists. In 1999, she started all 32 games, finishing seventh in the league in assists, averaging 4.6 per game. She averaged 5.1 points and shot 76.3 percent from the free throw line.

Nagy was traded to New York Liberty along with the 57th pick in the 2001 WNBA draft for the 28th and 44th picks in the 2001 WNBA draft. She was traded by the New York Liberty to the Sacramento Monarchs at beginning of 2002 season in exchange for the 2003 second round draft pick on April 22, 2002. She started eight games with the Monarchs, averaging three assists per game in 24 appearances, ranking her third in the league with 7.1 assists per 40 minutes average.

Nagy played professionally for seven seasons before retiring in 2003.

== International ==
Nagy played as starting point guard for the MTK in Hungary, where she won the 1991 Hungarian Championship. She played as point guard for the 1991 Hungarian Women's National Basketball Team that won the bronze medal at the European Championship. She played as starting point guard for the 1995–1996 Strasbourg team in France. She played as starting point guard for the 1999 Fenerbahçe Istanbul team in Turkey, where she won the Turkish Cup, Turkish President's Cup, and the Turkish Championship.

== WNBA career highlights ==
- Ranked #9 in the WNBA in assists per 40 minutes (6.7)
- Scored 12 points at Los Angeles in 1999
- Six rebounds vs. Cleveland in 1999
- Twelve assists vs. Charlotte in 1999
- Made six three-point field goals at Los Angeles in 2000
- Led the Washington Mystics in total assists (118) and was fifth in the league in assists per game (5.1) in 2000

== Honors ==
- Trans America Athletic Conference All-Tournament Team (1992, 1993, 1994, 1995)
- Associated Press All-America (1995 3rd Team)
- Fast Break Magazine Freshman All-America (1992)
- FIU Inaugural Hall of Fame inductee (2006)
- Kodak All-America (1994)
- Trans America Athletic Conference Newcomer of the Year (1992)
- Trans America Athletic Conference Player of the Year (1994)
- Trans America Athletic Conference Tournament MVP (1992, 1993, 1994, 1995)
- Trans America Athletic Conference All-Conference First Team (1992, 1993, 1994, 1995)
- U.S. Basketball Writers Association All-America (1994, 1995)
- USA Today All-America (1994)
- Women's Basketball News Service All-America (1995)
- Women's Basketball News Service Freshman All-America (1992)

== Career statistics ==
=== WNBA career statistics ===
Career averages
YEAR	TEAM	G	GS	MPG	FG%	3P%	FT%	OFF	DEF	RPG	APG	SPG	BPG	TO	PF	PPG
1999	WAS	32	32	29.6	.409	.273	.763	.30	2.10	2.40	4.6	.97	.09	2.59	3.50	5.1
2000	WAS	23	23	30.2	.392	.359	.808	.40	2.30	2.70	5.1	.74	.35	2.39	2.40	4.2
2001	NYL	23	0	9.3	.419	.500	.500	.00	.40	.40	1.0	.09	.13	1.00	1.10	1.5
2002	SAC	24	8	17.0	.273	.214	.438	.10	1.10	1.20	3.0	.42	.17	1.29	2.10	1.4
Career		102	63	22.2	.385	.327	.714	.20	1.50	1.80	3.5	.59	.18	1.88	2.40	3.2
Playoff		4	0	7.5	.750	.000	.667	.00	1.00	1.00	.8	.00	.25	.75	.50	2.0

Career totals
YEAR	TEAM	G	GS	MIN	FGM-A	3PM-A	FTM-A	OFF	DEF	TOT	AST	STL	BLK	TO	PF	PTS
1999	WAS	32	32	947	54–132	9–33	45–59	11	67	78	146	31	3	83	111	162
2000	WAS	23	23	694	31–79	14–39	21–26	10	53	63	118	17	8	55	55	97
2001	NYL	23	0	213	13–31	6–12	2–4	0	9	9	24	2	3	23	25	34
2002	SAC	24	8	409	12–44	3–14	7–16	3	26	29	73	10	4	31	51	34
Career		102	63	2,263	110–286	32–98	75–105	24	155	179	361	60	18	192	242	327
Playoff		4	0	30	3–4	0–0	2–3	0	4	4	3	0	1	3	2	8

Legend
GP	Games played	GS	Games started	MPG	Minutes per game	FG%	Field goal percentage	3P%	3-point field goal percentage
FT%	Free throw percentage	RPG	Rebounds per game	APG	Assists per game	SPG	Steals per game	BPG	Blocks per game
TO	Turnovers per game	PPG	Points per game	**Bold**	Career high	*	Led Division I

=== College ===
Year	Team	GP	GS	MPG	FG%	3P%	FT%	RPG	APG	SPG	BPG	TO	PPG
1991–92	FIU	**33**	-	-	50.1	32.4	72.3	2.9	8.5	2.5	0.2	-	13.8
1992–93	FIU	31	-	-	46.8	26.7	69.7	3.4	8.7	2.5	0.2	-	13.6
1993–94	FIU	29	-	-	**58.9**	**40.0**	**75.5**	**4.2**	**10.3***	2.2	0.2	-	**17.5**
1994–95	FIU	32	-	-	43.3	26.9	75.3	3.8	9.8*	**2.8**	0.2	-	13.3
**Career**		125	-	-	49.7	32.1	73.2	3.6	9.3	2.5	0.2	-	14.5
Statistics retrieved from Sports-Reference.

== See also ==
- List of NCAA Division I women's basketball career assists leaders
