= Florida Gators women's basketball =

2026–27 Florida Gators women's basketball team
- University: University of Florida
- Head coach: Tammi Reiss (1st season)
- Location: Gainesville, Florida
- Arena: Exactech Arena at Stephen C. O'Connell Center (capacity: 10,136)
- Conference: SEC
- Nickname: Florida Gators
- Colors: Orange and blue
- Student section: Orange and Blue Crew

NCAA Division I tournament Elite Eight
- 1997
Other NCAA Division I tournament results
Sweet Sixteen	1997, 1998
Appearances	1993, 1994, 1995, 1996, 1997, 1998, 1999, 2001, 2002, 2004, 2006, 2009, 2012, 2014, 2016, 2022

Uniforms
Home	Away	Alternate

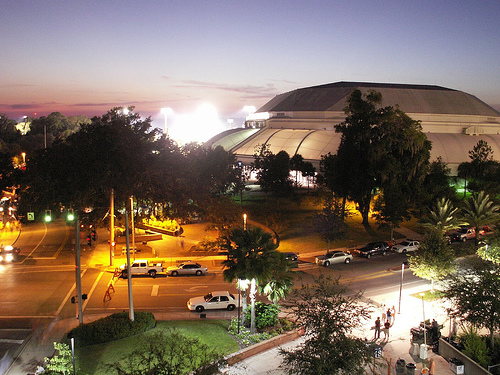
O'Connell Center, the home court of the Florida Gators women's basketball team.

The Florida Gators women's basketball team represents the University of Florida in the sport of basketball. The Gators compete in Division I of the National Collegiate Athletic Association (NCAA) and the Southeastern Conference (SEC). The Gators play their home games at the O'Connell Center located on the university's Gainesville, Florida campus, and are currently led by head coach Tammi Reiss. The Gators have appeared in 15 NCAA tournaments, with a record of 12–15.

== History ==
Women's basketball was approved as a sport by the University of Florida in March 1972, and began play in 1973 as a club team. In 1975, the Gators debuted as a varsity program under head coach Paula Welch. They made local headlines in 1976 by winning the "state championship" by beating the other three women's teams in the state at that time.

While historically overshadowed by divisional (and national) basketball powers Tennessee and Georgia, the Gators have made several NCAA tournament appearances and sent players to the WNBA, such as DeLisha Milton-Jones. The winningest coach at Florida is Carol Ross, who guided the team for twelve seasons but left Florida to coach the women's basketball team at her alma mater, Ole Miss.

Florida's women's team was coached by Carolyn Peck, a former WNBA coach who won a national title with Purdue, from 2002 to 2007. Peck was fired midway through the 2006–2007 season (though she was allowed to finish out the season), after enduring the worst losing streak of any Gator sports program.

Former University of Florida player and previous Charlotte coach Amanda Butler was named the new women's basketball coach on April 13, 2007, and remained in that position until 2017.

On March 27, 2017, Cameron Newbauer was announced as the 10th head coach of the University of Florida women's basketball program.

On February 28, 2022, assistant coach Kelly Rae Finley was promoted to the head coach position after assuming interim head coach duties during the 2021-22 season.

== 2026 - 2027 Roster ==
2024–25 Florida Gators women's basketball team
Players
Coaches

Pos.	#	Name	Height	Year	Previous school	Hometown
F	0	Aurora Almón	6 ft 4 in (1.93 m)	Jr	Syracuse	Santo Domingo, DR
F	1	Jade Weathersby	6 ft 2 in (1.88 m)	Sr	UAB	Aurora, CO
G	3	Moriah Murray	5 ft 8 in (1.73 m)	Sr	Penn State	Dunmore, PA
G	11	Bailey Harris	5 ft 11 in (1.8 m)	Fr	St. Mary's HS	Annapolis, MD
G	21	Taliyah Parker	6 ft 1 in (1.85 m)	Jr	TCU	Oklahoma City, OK
G	23	Vanessa Harris	5 ft 10 in (1.78 m)	So	Rhode Island	Glenarden, MD
F	24	Mallory Miller	6 ft 4 in (1.93 m)	Jr	Butler	Aberdeen, S.D.
F	tbd	Vivian Iwuchukwu	6 ft 3 in (1.91 m)	Jr	USC	Imo State, Nigeria
G	tbd	Jordan Jones	6 ft 0 in (1.83 m)	Sr	Arizona State	Sylmar, CA
G	tbd	Kiyomi McMiller	5 ft 8 in (1.73 m)	Jr	Penn State	Silver Spring, MD

Head coach

- Tammi Reiss (Virginia)

Assistant coach(es)

- Shay Robinson (Central Florida) (AHC)
- Tahnee Balerio (Missouri State) (AHC)
- CJ Jones (Francis Marion) (AHC)
- Jen Fay (Quinnipiac)
- Cynthia Jordan (Temple)

Legend

- (C) Team captain
- (S) Suspended
- (I) Ineligible
- (W) Walk-on
- Injured
- Current redshirt

Roster

== Year by year results ==
Conference tournament winners noted with # Source

Season	Team	Overall	Conference	Standing	Postseason	Coaches' poll	AP poll
Paula Welch (Independent) (1974–1976)
1974–75	Paula Welch	13–6	–		FAIAW		
1975–76	Paula Welch	16–8	–		AIAW Region III		
Paula Welch:		29–14	–				
Cathy Davis (Independent) (1976–1979)
1976–77	Cathy Davis	12–10	–		AIAW Region III		
1977–78	Cathy Davis	12–14	–				
1978–79	Cathy Davis	12–15	–		AIAW Region III		
Cathy Davis:		36–39	–				
Mickie DeMoss (Independent, SEC) (1979–1983)
1979–80	Mickie DeMoss	10–19	–		AIAW Region III		
1980–81	Mickie DeMoss	11–17	–		FAIAW		
1981–82	Mickie DeMoss	13–16	–		FAIAW		
1982–83	Mickie DeMoss	11–16	1–7	5th East			
Mickie DeMoss:		45–68	1–7				
Debbie Yow (SEC) (1983–1985)
1983–84	Debbie Yow	19–9	2–6	5th East			
1984–85	Debbie Yow	22–9	4–4	T–2nd East	NWIT Second Place		
Debbie Yow:		41–18	6–10				
Carol Whitmire (SEC) (1985–1990)
1985–86	Carol Whitmire	10–18	2–7	9th			
1986–87	Carol Whitmire	12–16	0–9	10th			
1987–88	Carol Whitmire	9–18	1–8	9th			
1988–89	Carol Whitmire	15–14	1–8	T–9th			
1989–90	Carol Whitmire	12–10	1–6				
Carol Whitmire:		58–76	5–38				
Lea Henry (SEC) (1990–1990)
1990	Lea Henry	3–3	0–2	9th			
Lea Henry:		3–3	0–2				
Carol Ross (SEC) (1990–2002)
1990–91	Carol Ross	17–11	3–6	T–8th			
1991–92	Carol Ross	15–13	4–7	T–7th			
1992–93	Carol Ross	19–10	6–5	T–4th	NCAA Play-In		
1993–94	Carol Ross	22–7	8–3	3rd	NCAA First Round	25	20
1994–95	Carol Ross	24–9	7–4	T–4th	NCAA Second Round	18	17
1995–96	Carol Ross	21–9	6–5	T–5th	NCAA First Round	22	16
1996–97	Carol Ross	24–9	9–3	T–3rd	NCAA Elite Eight	6	7
1997–98	Carol Ross	23–9	10–4	T–2nd	NCAA Sweet Sixteen	12	13
1998–99	Carol Ross	19–14	6–8	T–8th	NCAA First Round		
1999–2000	Carol Ross	21–13	6–8	T–6th	WNIT Finals		
2000–01	Carol Ross	24–6	11–3	T–2nd	NCAA Second Round	18	14
2001–02	Carol Ross	18–11	8–6	T–4th	NCAA First Round		24
Carol Ross:		247–121	84–62				
Carolyn Peck (SEC) (2002–2007)
2002–03	Carolyn Peck	9–19	1–13	T–11th			
2003–04	Carolyn Peck	19–11	8–6	T–4th	NCAA Second Round		
2004–05	Carolyn Peck	14–15	5–9	8th	WNIT First Round		
2005–06	Carolyn Peck	21–9	8–6	T–5th	NCAA First Round		
2006–07	Carolyn Peck	9–22	2–12	11th			
Carolyn Peck:		72–76	24–46				
Amanda Butler (SEC) (2007–2017)
2007–08	Amanda Butler	19–14	6–8	T–7th	WNIT Third Round		
2008–09	Amanda Butler	24–8	9–5	T4th	NCAA Second Round	23	22
2009–10	Amanda Butler	15–17	7–9	T–7th	WNIT Second Round		
2010–11	Amanda Butler	20–15	7–9	8th	WNIT Third Round		
2011–12	Amanda Butler	20–13	8–8	8th	NCAA Second Round		
2012–13	Amanda Butler	22–15	6–10	T–8th	WNIT Semifinals		
2013–14	Amanda Butler	20–13	8–8	5th	NCAA Second round		
2014–15	Amanda Butler	13–17	5–11	12th			
2015–16	Amanda Butler	22–8	10–6	T–4th	NCAA First Round		
2016–17	Amanda Butler	15–16	5–11	T–11th			
Amanda Butler:		190–136	71–85				
Cameron Newbauer (SEC) (2017–2021)
2017–18	Cameron Newbauer	11–19	3–13	T-11th			
2018–19	Cameron Newbauer	8–23	3–13	T-12th			
2019–20	Cameron Newbauer	15–15	6–10	10th			
2020–21	Cameron Newbauer	12–14	3–11	11th	WNIT Second Round		
Cameron Newbauer:		46–71	15–47				
Kelly Rae Finley (SEC) (2021–2026)
2021-22	Kelly Rae Finley	21-11	10-6	5th	NCAA First Round	23	21
2022-23	Kelly Rae Finley	19–15	5–11	T-10th			
2023-24	Kelly Rae Finley	16-16	5-11	11th	WBIT First Round		
2024-25	Kelly Rae Finley	19-18	5-11	11th	WBIT Semifinals		
2025-26	Kelly Rae Finley	18-15	5-11	T-12th			
Kelly Rae Finley:		93-75	30-50				
Tammi Reiss (SEC) (2026–Present)
2026-27	Tammi Reiss	0-0	0-0				
Tammi Reiss:		0-0	0-0				
Total:		827–705 (.540)					
National champion Postseason invitational champion Conference regular season champion Conference regular season and conference tournament champion Division regular season champion Division regular season and conference tournament champion Conference tournament champion

== NCAA tournament results ==
Florida has appeared in the NCAA Division I women's basketball tournament 16 times. They have a record of 12–16.

Year	Seed	Round	Opponent	Result
1993	#10	First Round; Second Round	#7 Bowling Green #2 Virginia	W 69-67; L 55-69
1994	#4	First Round	#13 Texas A&M	L 76-78
1995	#6	First Round; Second Round	#11 Radford #3 Virginia	W 89-49; L 67-72
1996	#5	First Round	#12 San Francisco	L 61-68
1997	#3	First Round; Second Round; Sweet Sixteen; Elite Eight	#14 FIU #6 USC #2 Louisiana Tech #1 Old Dominion	W 92-68; W 92-78; W 71-57; L 51-53
1998	#3	First Round; Second Round; Sweet Sixteen	#14 Montana #11 Virginia Tech #2 Duke	W 85-64; W 89-57; L 58-71
1999	#11	First Round	#6 Arizona	L 84-87 (OT)
2001	#3	First Round; Second Round	#14 Holy Cross #6 Washington	W 84-52; L 75-86
2002	#6	First Round	#11 BYU	L 52-90
2004	#5	First Round; Second Round	#12 New Mexico #4 Baylor	W 68-56; L 76-91
2006	#6	First Round	#11 New Mexico	L 59-83
2009	#8	First Round; Second Round	#9 Temple #1 Connecticut	W 70-57; L 59-87
2012	#9	First Round; Second Round	#8 Ohio State #1 Baylor	W 70-65; L 57-76
2014	#11	First Round; Second Round	#6 Dayton #3 Penn State	W 83-69; L 61-83
2016	#5	First Round	#12 Albany	L 59-61
2022	#10	First Round	#7 UCF	L 52-69

== Player awards ==
=== National awards ===
- Wade Trophy

DeLisha Milton – 1997

=== SEC Awards ===
- Player of the Year Award

DeLisha Milton – 1997

== WNBA basketball players ==
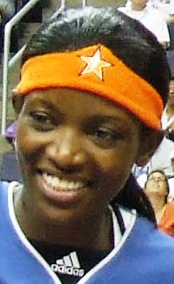
DeLisha Milton-Jones

Florida has produced a number of players for the Women's National Basketball Association (WNBA).

- Vanessa Hayden – Drafted with the 7th overall pick in the 2004 WNBA Draft by the Minnesota Lynx; retired in 2009 with the Los Angeles Sparks
- Tammy Jackson – Drafted with the 16th overall pick in the 1997 WNBA Draft; played five seasons with the Houston Comets where she won four straight WNBA Titles
- Merlakia Jones – Drafted with the 13th overall pick in the second round of the 1997 WNBA Draft by the now defunct Cleveland Rockers; she played a total of 8 seasons in the WNBA
- Brandi McCain – Drafted by the Cleveland Rockers with the 24th overall pick in 2002
- DeLisha Milton-Jones – Drafted with the 4th overall pick in the 1999 WNBA Draft by the Los Angeles Sparks; she was traded to the Washington Mystics in 2004 and traded back to the Sparks in 2007
- Murriel Page – Drafted by the Los Angeles Sparks with the 3rd overall pick in the 1998 WNBA Draft; played for the Sparks for 11 seasons
- Bridget Pettis – Drafted with the 7th overall pick in the 1997 WNBA Elite Draft by the Phoenix Mercury; spent five seasons with the Mercury before being traded to the Indiana Fever, where she played two seasons, in 2002; she returned to the WNBA for one final season with Phoenix in 2006
- Tamara Stocks – Drafted by the Washington Mystics with the 25th overall pick in the 2001 WNBA Draft
- Tiffany Travis – Drafted with the 27th overall pick by the Charlotte Sting in the 2000 WNBA Draft
- Sophia Witherspoon – Drafted with the 11th overall pick by the New York Liberty in the 1997 WNBA Draft; she played for the Liberty, the Fire, and the Sparks in her seven seasons in the league

== See also ==
- Florida Gators
- Florida Gators men's basketball
- History of the University of Florida
- List of Florida Gators in the WNBA
- List of University of Florida Athletic Hall of Fame members
- List of University of Florida Olympians
- University Athletic Association
- Women's basketball
