= Baltimore Starlings =

Women's basketball team based in Baltimore, Maryland

- League: UpShot League
- Founded: November 20, 2025; 11 months ago Baltimore, Maryland, U.S.
- History: 2027–
- Arena: Chesapeake Employers Insurance Arena
- Capacity: 5,500
- Location: Catonsville, Maryland
- Chairman: Andy Kaufmann
- President: Sonia Chase
- Ownership: Zawyer Sports & Entertainment; Greg Resh, governor
- Website: StarlingsUpShot.com

The Baltimore Starlings are a professional women's basketball team based in Baltimore, Maryland. The team is the first expansion franchise of the UpShot League, a women's basketball league in the United States. The team began playing in May 2026.

== History ==
In November 2025, the UpShot League announced its first expansion franchise for Baltimore, marking the league's growth beyond its original four markets in Jacksonville, Charlotte, Greensboro, and Savannah.

UpShot League commissioner, and former WNBA president Donna Orender, said at the team's introductory press conference, "We are thrilled, truly, that it is Baltimore... Baltimore is a mission-driven city, as is the Upshot League. We are grounded in purpose, opportunity, especially for girls, but for everyone. Because we truly believe when you lift up one, you lift up all."

== Ownership and management ==
UpShot Baltimore is owned and operated by Zawyer Sports & Entertainment, a Jacksonville, Florida–based sports management company that also owns and operates the UpShot League and its other member teams. Zawyer Sports was founded in 2018 by CEO Andy Kaufmann and has grown to include professional franchises across multiple sports.

Greg Resh, a Baltimore native and former CFO of the NFL's Washington Commanders, has been named governor of the franchise. In August 2026, UpShot Baltimore appointed former WNBA player and Baltimore native Sonia Chase as the franchise's president.

== Arena ==
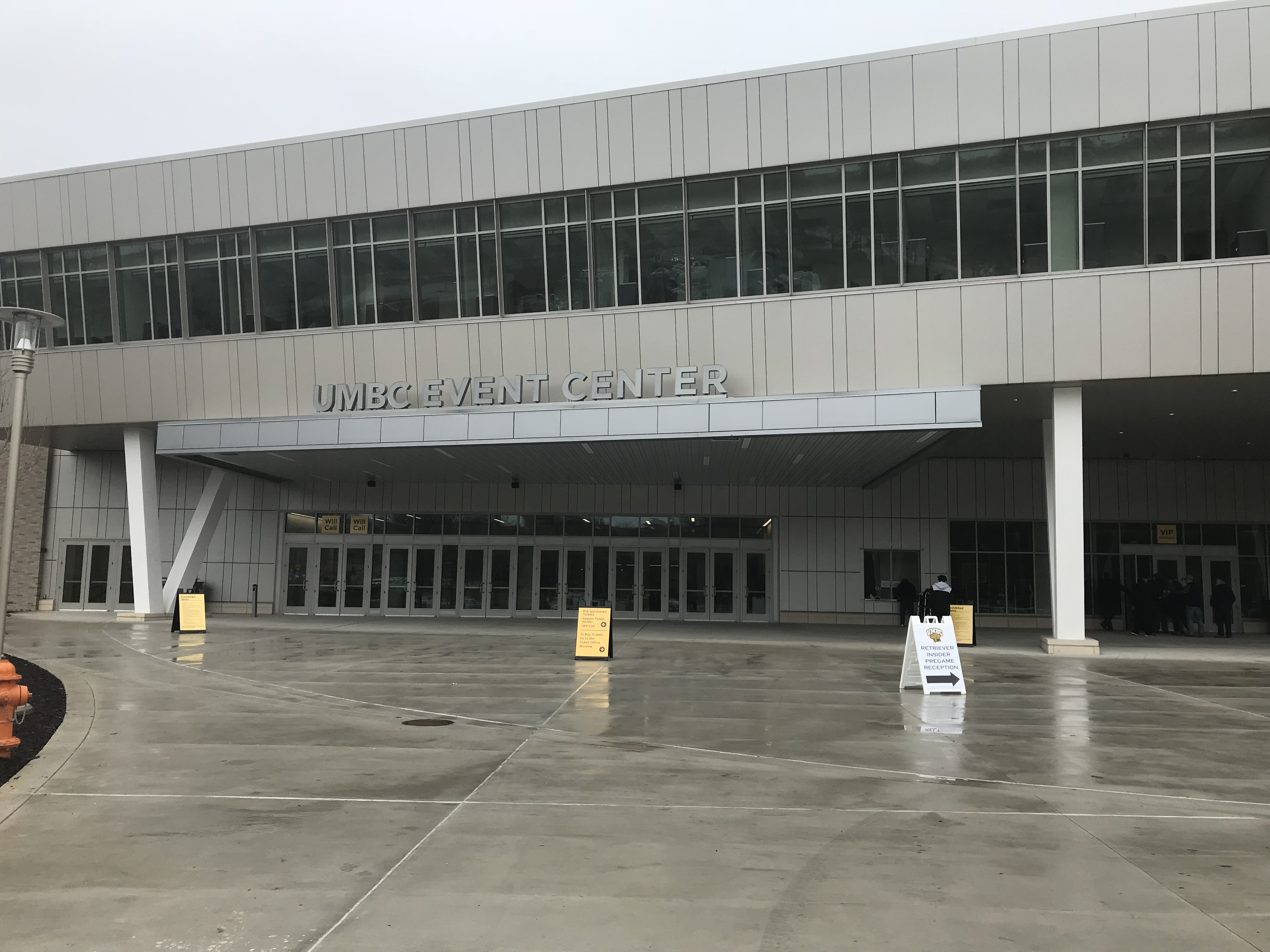
The entrance to the Chesapeake Employers Insurance Arena (formerly UMBC Event Center).

UpShot Baltimore is scheduled to play its home games at the Chesapeake Employers Insurance Arena in Catonsville, Maryland. UpShot League teams will play a 40-game regular season, separated by 20 home games and 20 away.

== Team identity ==
In September 2026, the team announced that it would be named the Baltimore Starlings, named after the European starling, a common bird found in Baltimore, and The Star-Spangled Banner. The name is a continuation of bird-themed team names in Baltimore, following Major League Baseball's Baltimore Orioles and the National Football League's Baltimore Ravens.
