= List of ECHL team owners =

Current ECHL team owners and the principal corporate entities that operate the clubs:

Conference	Team	Owner(s)	Principal(s)	Year acquired	NHL affiliate	AHL affiliate
Eastern	Adirondack Thunder	Adirondack Civic Center Coalition	Daniel Burke (President)	2017	New Jersey Devils	Utica Comets
Eastern	Greensboro Gargoyles	Zawyer Sports & Entertainment	Andy Kaufman	2024 (founded)	Carolina Hurricanes	Chicago Wolves
Eastern	Maine Mariners	Dexter Paine and family	Dexter Paine	2024	Boston Bruins	Providence Bruins
Eastern	Norfolk Admirals	Patrick Cavanagh	Patrick Cavanagh	2019	Winnipeg Jets	Manitoba Moose
Eastern	Reading Royals	Berks County Convention Center Authority	Michael Gombar Jr. (chairman)	2019	Philadelphia Flyers	Lehigh Valley Phantoms
Eastern	Trois-Rivières Lions	Spire Sports + Entertainment	Jeff Dickerson (CEO), TJ Puchyr	2024	Montreal Canadiens	Laval Rocket
Eastern	Wheeling Nailers	Hockey Club of the Ohio Valley	Regional Economic Development Partnership and the Wheeling Area Hockey Association	2012	Pittsburgh Penguins	Wilkes-Barre/Scranton Penguins
Eastern	Worcester Railers	Worcester Pro Hockey, LLC (Rucker Investments)	Cliff Rucker	2017 (founded)	New York Islanders	Bridgeport Islanders
Eastern	Atlanta Gladiators	ATL Hockey Group, LLC	Alex Campbell (majority), Anson Carter (minority)	2022	Nashville Predators	Milwaukee Admirals
Eastern	Florida Everblades	David Hoffmann	David Hoffmann	2019	St. Louis Blues	Springfield Thunderbirds
Eastern	Greenville Swamp Rabbits	Spire Sports + Entertainment	Jeff Dickerson (CEO), TJ Puchyr		Los Angeles Kings	Ontario Reign
Eastern	Jacksonville Icemen	Zawyer Sports & Entertainment(SZH Hockey LLC)	Andrew Kaufman	2019	Buffalo Sabres	Rochester Americans
Eastern	Orlando Solar Bears	RDV Sports, Inc.	Dan DeVos (chairman), Alex Martins (CEO)	2017	Tampa Bay Lightning	Syracuse Crunch
Eastern	Savannah Ghost Pirates	Zawyer Sports & Entertainment	Andrew Kaufman		Florida Panthers	Charlotte Checkers
Eastern	South Carolina Stingrays	Todd Halloran	Todd Halloran	2018	Washington Capitals	Hershey Bears
Western	Bloomington Bison	Hallett Sports and Entertainment	Sean Hallett	2024 (founded)	New York Rangers	Hartford Wolf Pack
Western	Cincinnati Cyclones	Nederlander Entertainment	James L. Nederlander James M. Nederlander		Toronto Maple Leafs	Toronto Marlies
Western	Fort Wayne Komets	The Franke Family		1990	Edmonton Oilers	Bakersfield Condors
Western	Indy Fuel	Hallett Sports and Entertainment	Jim Hallet (chairman), Sean Hallet (CEO)	2014 (founded)	Chicago Blackhawks	Rockford IceHogs
Western	Iowa Heartlanders	Michael Devlin	Michael Devlin		Minnesota Wild	Iowa Wild
Western	Kalamazoo Wings	Greenleaf Hospitality	William D. Johnston, Ronda Stryker	2008	Vancouver Canucks	Abbotsford Canucks
Western	Toledo Walleye	Toledo Arena Sports Inc.	Joe Napoli (president)	2007	Detroit Red Wings	Grand Rapids Griffins
Western	Allen Americans	Myles Jack,LaSonjia Jack	Myles Jack,LaSonjia Jack	2023	Ottawa Senators	Belleville Senators
Western	Idaho Steelheads	Idaho Sports Properties LLC	Eric Trapp (president), John Cunningham	2004	Dallas Stars	Texas Stars
Western	Kansas City Mavericks	Lamar Hunt Jr.	Lamar Hunt Jr.		Seattle Kraken	Coachella Valley Firebirds
Western	Rapid City Rush	Spire Sports + Entertainment	Jeff Dickerson (CEO), TJ Puchyr	2019	Calgary Flames	Calgary Wranglers
Western	Tahoe Knight Monsters	David Hodges (Majority), Tim & Demi Tebow (Minority),Chip & Joanna Gaines (Minority)	David Hodges (Majority), Tim & Demi Tebow (Minority),Chip & Joanna Gaines (Minority)	2007	Vegas Golden Knights	Henderson Silver Knights
Western	Tulsa Oilers	NL Sports, LLC	Andy Scurto	2021	Anaheim Ducks	San Diego Gulls
Western	Utah Grizzlies (Trenton Ironhawks)	Pro Hockey Partners, LLC	Bob Ohrablo (president)	2025	Colorado Avalanche	Colorado Eagles
Western	Wichita Thunder	Steven Brothers Sports Management	Rodney Steven, Brandon Steven, Johnny Steven	2011	San Jose Sharks	San Jose Barracuda

== See also ==
- List of current NHL franchise owners
- List of AHL team owners
