= Charlotte Crown =

Women's basketball team based in Charlotte, North Carolina

- League: UpShot League
- Founded: January 30, 2025; 21 months ago Charlotte, North Carolina, U.S.
- History: 2026–
- Arena: Bojangles Coliseum
- Capacity: 8,600
- Location: Charlotte, North Carolina
- Team colors: Royal purple, Black, Light violet, White
- Head coach: Trisha Stafford-Odom
- Ownership: Zawyer Sports & Entertainment
- Championships: 2026
- Website: CrownUpShot.com

The Charlotte Crown are a professional women's basketball team based in Charlotte, North Carolina. The team is part of the UpShot League, a women's basketball league in the United States. The Crown are one of the league's inaugural four franchises, whose first full regular season ended on August 23, 2026.

== History ==
In October 2025, the UpShot League unveiled the Charlotte Crown as its newest franchise, marking the return of professional women's basketball to the Queen City. The team is operated by Zawyer Sports & Entertainment, which also owns the Charlotte Checkers and the Gastonia Ghost Peppers. The UpShot League debuted in May 2026 with four teams: the Charlotte Crown, Jacksonville Waves, Savannah Steel, and Greensboro Groove. The league aims to provide a platform for aspiring athletes aiming to reach the WNBA.

On December 8, 2025, the UpShot League announced the opening weekend matchups for each team. Charlotte opened its season on May 21, 2026, against the Jacksonville Waves.

The regular season concluded on August 23, 2026, with the Crown earning a spot in the championship game with a 21-11 record.

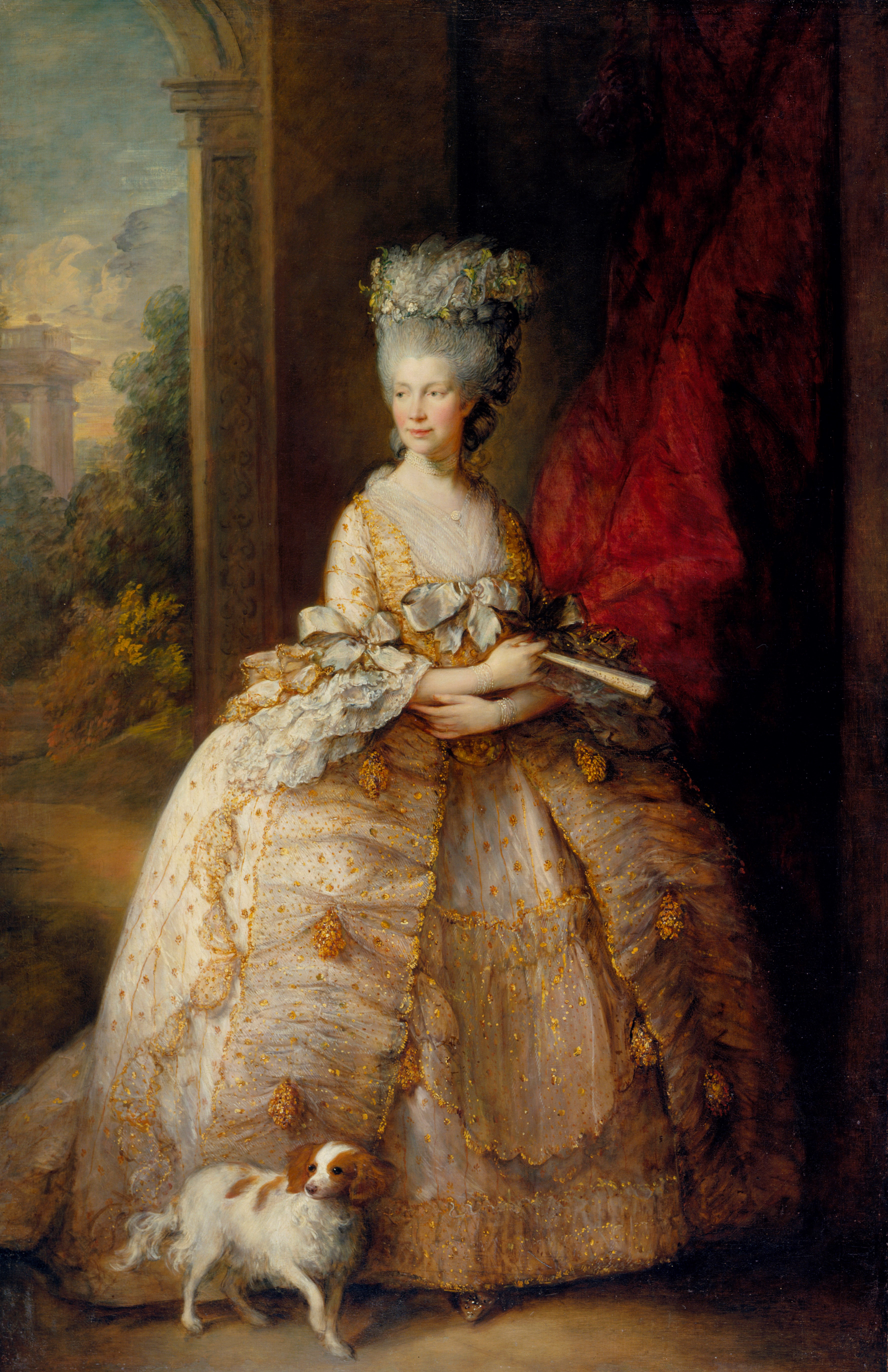
Queen Charlotte of Mecklenburg-Strelitz

=== Coach ===
Former WNBA player Trisha Stafford-Odom has been named the first head coach of the Charlotte Crown. Stafford-Odom brings a wealth of experience to the team, having previously coached at Duke, North Carolina Central, and the University of North Carolina. She is committed to scouting local talent and building a competitive team.

=== Name ===
The name is a reference to the city's nickname, "The Queen City," as the city was named for Charlotte of Mecklenburg-Strelitz, Queen of Great Britain and Ireland.

=== Player development ===
In July 2026, Michelle Onyiah became the first player in UpShot League history to sign with a WNBA team when she joined the Indiana Fever on a developmental roster contract. Onyiah had played for the Crown during the league's inaugural season, averaging 9.6 points, 6.9 rebounds, and 1.1 blocks per game in 21 games before signing with Indiana.

== Arena ==
The Crown will play their home games at Bojangles Coliseum, located in Charlotte. The arena has a seating capacity of 8,600 and will host the team's 17 regular-season games from May to August.

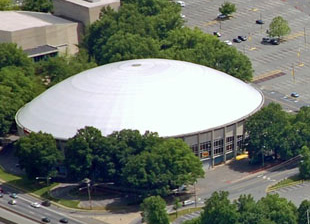
Bojangles Coliseum in 2007

== Ownership ==
Zawyer Sports & Entertainment, the team's owners, is a Florida-based company. They are committed to investing in facilities for its teams, including plans for a $20 million, 90,000-square-foot basketball venue to house the Crown's practice sessions. Discussions are underway to secure local government funding for the facility.

== Personnel ==
=== Current roster ===
Charlotte Crown roster
Players
Coaches

Pos.	No.	Name	Age – Date of birth	Height	Club	Ctr.
G	23	Asia Durr	29 – 5 April 1997	5 ft 10 in (1.78 m)	Louisville	(United States)
G	2	Deja Kelly	24 – 8 September 2001	5 ft 8 in (1.73 m)	Oregon	(United States)
G	3	Reigan Richardson	23 – 16 February 2003	5 ft 11 in (1.8 m)	Duke	(United States)
G	30	Janay Sanders	26 – 28 January 2000	5 ft 11 in (1.8 m)	Minnesota	(United States)
G	26	Kiki Jefferson	25 – March 1, 2001	6 ft 1 in (1.85 m)	Louisville	(United States)
G	5	Kirsten Deans	24 – October 27, 2001	5 ft 8 in (1.73 m)	Ole Miss	(United States)
G	10	Kylie Kornegay-Lucas	25 – August 4, 2001	5 ft 10 in (1.78 m)	Towson	(United States)
F	24	LeLe Grissett	27 – 3 June 1999	6 ft 2 in (1.88 m)	South Carolina	(United States)
G	1	Nicole Gwynn	24 – May 15, 2002	5 ft 7 in (1.7 m)	Georgia Southern	(United States)
C	7	Quinzia Fulmore	20 – 6 January 2006	6 ft 3 in (1.91 m)	Elon	(United States)
F/C	15	Schaquilla Nunn	32 – July 7, 1994	6 ft 3 in (1.91 m)	Winthrop	(United States)

Head coach

Trisha Stafford-Odom
