= Coretta Brown =

American basketball player (born 1980)

Savannah Steel
- Position: Head Coach
- League: UpShot League

Personal information
- Born: October 21, 1980 (age 46) Statesboro, Georgia, U.S.
- Listed height: 5 ft 9 in (1.75 m)
- Listed weight: 150 lb (68 kg)

Career information
- High school: Southeast Bulloch (Brooklet, Georgia)
- College: North Carolina (1999–2003)
- WNBA draft: 2003: 1st round, 11th overall pick
- Drafted by: San Antonio Silver Stars
- Playing career: 2003–2006

Career history

Playing
- 2003–2005: Indiana Fever
- 2006: Chicago Sky

Coaching
- 2009–2012: Tennessee Tech (assistant)
- 2012–2016: Thomas
- 2017–2019: West Alabama (assistant)
- 2019–2021: Georgia Southern (assistant)
- 2021–2025: Eastern Kentucky (assistant)
- 2025–present: Savannah Steel
- Stats at Basketball Reference

Coretta Renay Brown (born October 21, 1980) is an American former professional basketball player and current head coach of the Savannah Steel of the UpShot League.

== College ==
Brown played for University of North Carolina at Chapel Hill, where she was team captain in her junior and senior seasons. She retired as the school's all-time leader in three-pointers made. She earned a Bachelor of Arts Degree in African American Studies and a minor in English.

=== North Carolina statistics ===
Legend
GP	Games played	GS	Games started	MPG	Minutes per game
FG%	Field goal percentage	3P%	3-point field goal percentage	FT%	Free throw percentage
RPG	Rebounds per game	APG	Assists per game	SPG	Steals per game
BPG	Blocks per game	PPG	Points per game	**Bold**	Career high

Year	Team	GP	Points	FG%	3P%	FT%	RPG	APG	SPG	BPG	PPG
1999-00	North Carolina	33	135	30.0%	26.5%	63.4%	1.7	1.8	1.0	0.0	4.1
2000-01	North Carolina	29	462	38.2%	37.0%	68.3%	4.8	**6.7**	1.3	0.2	15.9
2001-02	North Carolina	**35**	**598**	**43.5%**	39.4%	72.0%	**5.0**	3.4	1.6	0.2	**17.1**
2002-03	North Carolina	34	492	39.6%	**39.5%**	**83.3%**	3.6	4.3	**1.7**	0.1	14.5
Career		131	1687	39.5%	38.0%	72.9%	3.8	3.9	1.4	0.1	12.9

== Coaching career ==
- Tennessee Technological University (assistant coach for three seasons)
- Thomas University (head coach)
- University of West Alabama (assistant coach)
- Georgia Southern University (assistant coach)
- Eastern Kentucky University (assistant coach)

On September 30, 2025, Brown was named head coach of the Savannah Steel of the UpShot League, a developmental league for women's basketball.

== Honors and awards ==
=== As a player ===
- First-team all-ACC (2002-2003)
- Second-team all-conference (2001)

== Personal life ==
Brown has three older sisters.
