= List of AHL team owners =

Current AHL team owners and the principal corporate entities that operate the clubs:

Overview of American Hockey League teams
Conference	Team Name	Owner(s)	Principal(s)	Year acquired	NHL affiliate
Eastern	Bridgeport Islanders	Jon Ledecky	Jon Ledecky	2014	New York Islanders
Eastern	Charlotte Checkers	Zawyer Sports & Entertainment	Andrew Kaufman	2024	Florida Panthers
Eastern	Hartford Wolf Pack	Oskar layton	James L. Dolan		New York Rangers
Eastern	Hershey Bears	Hershey Entertainment and Resorts Company	Hershey Trust Company		Washington Capitals
Eastern	Lehigh Valley Phantoms	The Brooks Group	Robert and Jim Brooks	2009	Philadelphia Flyers
Eastern	Providence Bruins	H. Larue Renfroe	H. Larue Renfroe	2006	Boston Bruins
Eastern	Springfield Thunderbirds	Springfield Hockey, LLC	Fran Cataldo	2016	St. Louis Blues
Eastern	Wilkes-Barre/Scranton Penguins	Ronald Burkle, Mario Lemieux	Ronald Burkle, Mario Lemieux		Pittsburgh Penguins
Eastern	Belleville Senators	Michael Andlauer	Michael Andlauer		Ottawa Senators
Eastern	Cleveland Monsters	Rock Entertainment Group	Dan Gilbert	2006	Columbus Blue Jackets
Eastern	Laval Rocket	Molson family	Geoff Molson (chairman)		Montreal Canadiens
Eastern	Rochester Americans	Terry Pegula	Terry Pegula	2011	Buffalo Sabres
Eastern	Syracuse Crunch	Howard Dolgon	Howard Dolgon		Tampa Bay Lightning
Eastern	Toronto Marlies	Maple Leaf Sports & Entertainment	Rogers Communications		Toronto Maple Leafs
Eastern	Utica Comets	Harris Blitzer Sports & Entertainment	Josh Harris, David Blitzer	2013	New Jersey Devils
Western	Chicago Wolves	Don Levin	Don Levin	1994 (founded)	Carolina Hurricanes
Western	Grand Rapids Griffins	Dan DeVos	Dan DeVos		Detroit Red Wings
Western	Iowa Wild	Minnesota Sports and Entertainment	Craig Leipold		Minnesota Wild
Western	Manitoba Moose	True North Sports & Entertainment	Mark Chipman	2003	Winnipeg Jets
Western	Milwaukee Admirals	Harris Turer	Harris Turer	2005	Nashville Predators
Western	Rockford IceHogs	Wirtz Corporation	Danny Wirtz	2021	Chicago Blackhawks
Western	Texas Stars	Tom Gaglardi	Tom Gaglardi	2014	Dallas Stars
Western	Abbotsford Canucks	Canucks Sports & Entertainment	Francesco Aquilini (chairman, Aquilini Investment Group)	2021	Vancouver Canucks
Western	Bakersfield Condors	Oilers Entertainment Group	Daryl Katz		Edmonton Oilers
Western	Calgary Wranglers	Calgary Sports and Entertainment	N. Murray Edwards, Alvin Libin, Allan Markin, Jeffrey McCaig, Byron Seaman,		Calgary Flames
Western	Coachella Valley Firebirds	Oak View Group	Irving Azoff (president)	2021	Seattle Kraken
Western	Colorado Eagles	Colorado Eagles Professional Hockey LLC	Martin Lind		Colorado Avalanche
Western	Henderson Silver Knights	Black Knight Sports and Entertainment	Bill Foley (chairman)	2020	Vegas Golden Knights
Western	Ontario Reign	Anschutz Entertainment Group	Philip Anschutz		Los Angeles Kings
Western	San Diego Gulls	Henry Samueli	Henry Samueli and Susan Samueli	2005	Anaheim Ducks
Western	San Jose Barracuda	San Jose Sports & Entertainment Enterprises	Hasso Plattner		San Jose Sharks
Western	Tucson Roadrunners	Alex Meruelo	Alex Meruelo		Utah Mammoth

== See also ==
- List of current NHL franchise owners
- List of ECHL team owners
