= Sonia Chase =

American basketball player (born 1976)

- Chase in 2026

Personal information
- Born: March 9, 1976 (age 50) Baltimore, Maryland, U.S.
- Listed height: 5 ft 9 in (1.75 m)
- Listed weight: 150 lb (68 kg)

Career information
- High school: McDonogh School (Owings Mills, Maryland)
- College: University of Maryland, College Park
- WNBA draft: 1998: 4th round, 37th overall pick
- Drafted by: Charlotte Sting
- Playing career: 1998–2003
- Position: Guard

Career history
- 1998–2000: Charlotte Sting
- 2001–2003: Minnesota Lynx

Career highlights
- 2x MVP A1 National Women's Basketball Division (1999, 2000); 2x MVP Women's Basketball Super League (2001, 2002); MVP Women's Chinese Basketball Association (2003)
- Stats at Basketball Reference

Sonia Chase (born March 9, 1976) is a former professional female basketball player and philanthropist. She currently serves as the president for the Baltimore expansion team of the UpShot League.

== High school career ==
Sonia Chase attended the McDonogh School, in Owings Mills, Maryland and became a four-year Varsity starter and two-time captain in high school. She was the first female athlete in school history to score over 3,000 points and also set records that currently still stand today for scoring, assists, rebounds and steals. Due to Chase's historic contribution, the McDonogh School created the Sonia Chase Award to recognize female athletes who demonstrate strong athletic ability and good attitude.

== College career ==
Chase was signed to play basketball for the Maryland Terrapins women's basketball in 1994. During the 1996 Maryland Terrapins women's basketball season, Chase led the Atlantic Coast Conference in steals with an average of 3.3 per game. She received honorable mentions in the ACC Women's Basketball Tournament in 1996 and 1997.

== Professional career ==
Chase was the first female in school history to be drafted from the University of Maryland, College Park to the WNBA. Chase was drafted to the Charlotte Sting in the 1998 WNBA draft. She was the 37th overall pick in the draft's 4th round. Chase was then signed to play professionally by the Minnesota Lynx in 2001.

During the WNBA off seasons, she played in 10 countries including Greece, Turkey and China in the FIBA

In August 2026, the Baltimore expansion of the UpShot League appointed Chase as the franchise's president.

== Personal life ==
Sonia Chase started the non-profit Chase Your Dreams Academy to provide basketball camps for low-income and at-risk youth.

== Career statistics ==
Legend
GP	Games played	GS	Games started	MPG	Minutes per game	RPG	Rebounds per game
APG	Assists per game	SPG	Steals per game	BPG	Blocks per game	PPG	Points per game
TO	Turnovers per game	FG%	Field-goal percentage	3P%	3-point field-goal percentage	FT%	Free-throw percentage
**Bold**	Career best	°	League leader

=== WNBA ===
==== Regular season ====
Year	Team	GP	GS	MPG	FG%	3P%	FT%	RPG	APG	SPG	BPG	TO	PPG
1998	Charlotte	**23**	0	**7.2**	**.500**	–	**1.000**	**.6**	**.6**	.2	.0	.6	**1.5**
1999	Charlotte	13	0	4.5	.188	**.273**	**1.000**	.4	.4	**.3**	.0	**.2**	.8
Career	2 years, 1 team	36	0	6.2	.386	.273	1.000	.5	.5	.3	.0	.4	1.3
