= Henry Parrish Jr. =

American football player (born 2001)

Savannah Leprechauns
- Position: Running back

Personal information
- Born: March 1, 2001 (age 25); Carthage, Texas, U.S.
- Listed height: 5 ft 10 in (1.78 m)
- Listed weight: 190 lb (86 kg)

Career information
- High school: Christopher Columbus (Westchester, Florida)
- College: Ole Miss (2020–2021); Miami (2022–2023); Ole Miss (2024)
- NFL draft: 2025: undrafted

Career history
- Savannah Leprechauns (2027–)

Henry Parrish Jr. (born March 1, 2001) is an American professional football running back who currently plays for the Savannah Leprechauns of the Indoor Football League.

== Early life ==
Parrish attended Christopher Columbus High School, where he rushed for 4,454 yards and 31 touchdowns on 481 carries and made 34 catches for 450 yards and four touchdowns. He committed to play college football at Ole Miss over other schools such as Florida, Miami, Oregon, Penn State, and USC.

== College career ==
=== Ole Miss ===
In the 2020 regular season finale, Parrish rushed for 82 yards and two touchdowns and caught four passes for 27 yards in a 53-48 loss to LSU. He finished the COVID shortened 2020 season with 263 yards and two touchdowns on 56 carries and seven receptions for 59 yards. In week 6 of the 2021 season, Parrish ran for 118 yards on 18 carries in a 52-51 win over #13 Arkansas. In 2021 he rushed for 553 yards and three touchdowns on 105 carries and notched 21 receptions for 173 yards. After the season, Parrish entered the NCAA transfer portal.

=== Miami ===
Parrish transferred to Miami. In his team debut, he rushed for 108 yards and three touchdowns in a 70-13 win over Bethune-Cookman. Parrish finished the 2022 season with 130 carries for 616 yards and four touchdowns and 17 receptions for 120 yards and two touchdowns, earning third-team All-ACC honors. In week 4 of the 2023 season, he rushed for 139 yards and two touchdowns on 16 carries in a win over Temple.

== Professional career ==
Parrish went undrafted in the 2025 NFL draft, but did not sign with any teams.

=== Savannah Leprechauns ===
On October 2, Dixon was signed to the Savannah Leprechauns of the Indoor Football League for the team's inaugural 2027 season; the team announced the signing on October 5.
