= Spire Sports + Entertainment =

American entertainment management company

Spire Sports + Entertainment, Inc.
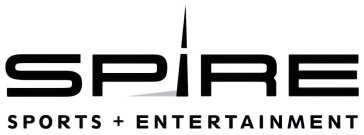
- Type: Private
- Industry: Motorsports; Music industry; Professional sports
- Headquarters: Cornelius, North Carolina, United States
- Key people: Jeff Dickerson (CEO, co-founder); TJ Puchyr (co-owner, co-founder); Emma Setzer (CFO); Todd Mackin (President)
- Subsidiaries: Spire Motorsports; Spire Music; Rapid City Rush; Trois-Rivières Lions; Greenville Swamp Rabbits; Athens Rock Lobsters
- Website: spiresportsinc.com

Spire Sports + Entertainment (SS+E) is an American talent management agency, motorsports consultant and sports ownership firm founded in 2010. SS+E represents drivers, sponsors and teams in NASCAR, IndyCar, and their respective development ladders, as well as music artists. SSE also owns a part of ECHL teams Rapid City Rush, Greenville Swamp Rabbits, and Trois-Rivières Lions.

== About ==
Spire was founded in 2010 by Jeff Dickerson and T.J. Puchyr and as a driver-focused motorsports industry. The agency works closely with NASCAR drivers and team owners, such as Rick Hendrick and Chip Ganassi, auto manufacturers like Toyota, and brands like 5-Hour Energy, as well as broker deals with driver transactions, sponsorships, and endorsements.

On December 4, 2018, it was announced that SS+E had purchased a charter in order to enter the NASCAR Cup Series and form its own race team, Spire Motorsports. The team currently fields Chevrolet ZL1s of the No. 7 for Daniel Suárez, the No. 71 of Michael McDowell and the No. 77 of Carson Hocevar.

=== Agency ===
Spire Sports + Entertainment have clients including James Hinchcliffe, Ross Chastain, Todd Gilliland, Justin Haley, and Garrett Smithley. They also have served as official consultants for various sponsors and teams including Hendrick Motorsports, Chip Ganassi Racing, GMS Racing, ThorSport Racing, Larson Marks Racing, 5-hour Energy, Eneos and DC Solar, as well as for Knoxville Raceway.

==== Legal issues ====
It was announced on June 28, 2018, that former client Brennan Poole would sue Chip Ganassi Racing and Spire Sports + Entertainment for breach of contract, alleging that CGR and Spire conspired to take away DC Solar's personal sponsorship from Poole and move it to the No. 42 CGR Cup Series team and that Spire's involvement representing both driver and team constituted a conflict of interest. Ganassi and Spire both released statements through attorneys denying the claims, with CGR's statement saying the sponsorship of Poole ended "because he never won a race despite the advantages of the best equipment in the garage."
