= Nashville Vibe =

Women's basketball team based in Baltimore, Maryland

- League: UpShot League
- Founded: July 20, 2026; 3 months ago Nashville, Tennessee, U.S.
- History: 2027–
- Arena: Memorial Gymnasium
- Capacity: 14,316
- Location: Nashville, Tennessee
- President: Nancy VanReece
- Ownership: Mark Walsh; Ally Love
- Website: nashvillevibe.com

The Nashville Vibe are an American professional women's basketball team based in Nashville, Tennessee. The team is the second expansion franchise of the UpShot League, a women's basketball league in the United States. The team are scheduled to begin play in May 2027.
