= Asia Durr =

American basketball player (born 1997)

AD Durr
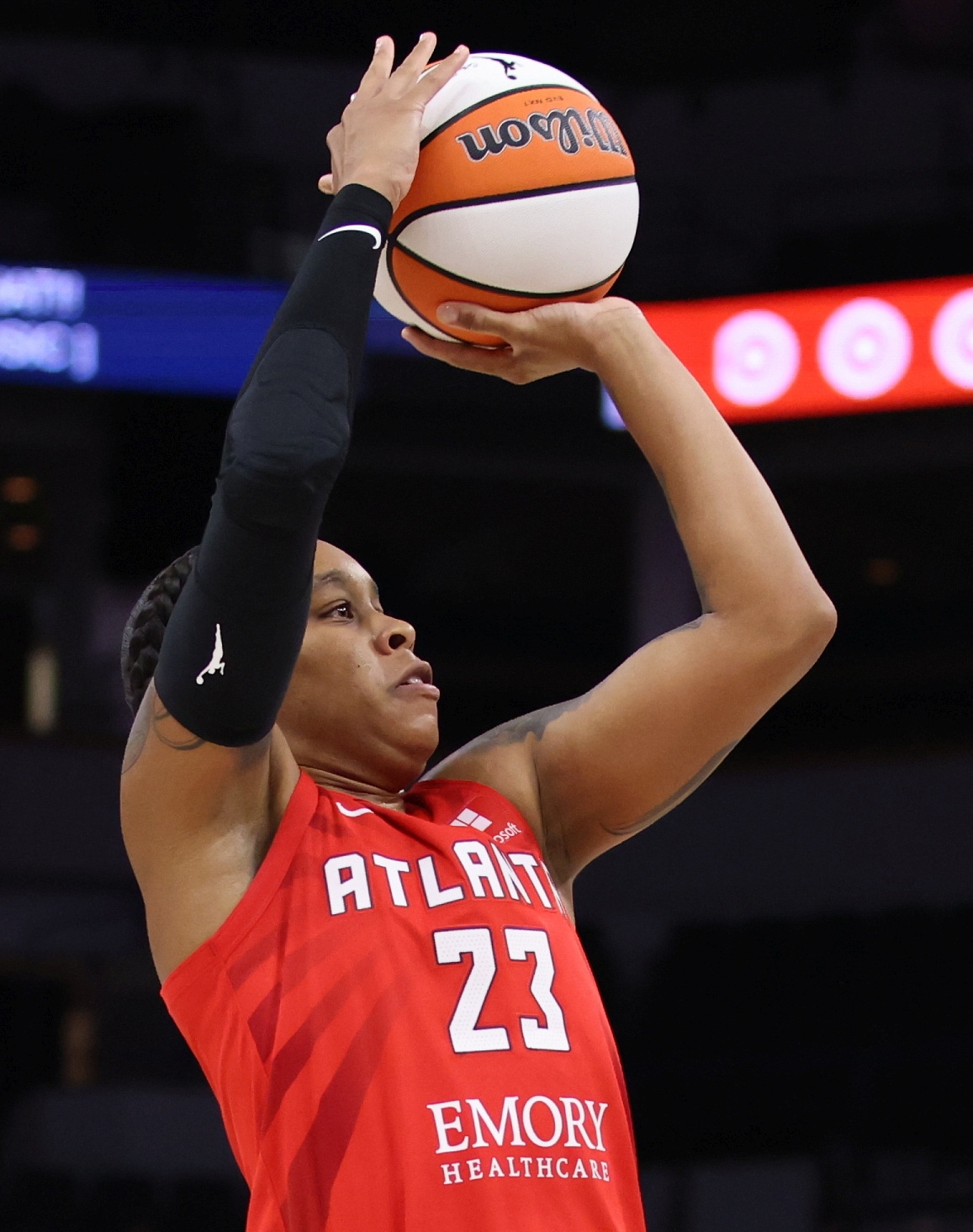

Charlotte Crown
- Position: Shooting guard
- League: WNBA

Personal information
- Born: April 5, 1997 (age 29) Douglasville, Georgia, U.S.
- Listed height: 5 ft 10 in (1.78 m)
- Listed weight: 151 lb (68 kg)

Career information
- High school: St. Pius X Catholic (Atlanta, Georgia)
- College: Louisville (2015–2019)
- WNBA draft: 2019: 1st round, 2nd overall pick
- Drafted by: New York Liberty
- Playing career: 2019–present

Career history
- 2019, 2022: New York Liberty
- 2022–2023: Atlanta Dream

Career highlights
- Dawn Staley Award (2019); Ann Meyers Drysdale Award (2019); 2× First-team All-American – AP (2018, 2019); 2× WBCA Coaches' All-American (2018, 2019); Second-team All-American – USBWA (2019); All-American – USBWA (2018); 2× ACC Player of the Year (2018, 2019); 3× First-team All-ACC (2017–2019); ACC All-Freshman Team (2016); McDonald's All-American (2015); 2× Miss Georgia Basketball (2014, 2015); FIBA Under-16 Americas Championship MVP (2013)
- Stats at WNBA.com
- Stats at Basketball Reference
Medals
Women's basketball
Representing the United States
FIBA Under-17 World Cup
| Gold medal – first place | 2014 Czech Republic | Team |
FIBA Americas Under-16 Championship
| Gold medal – first place | 2013 Mexico | Team |

Asia "AD" Durr (born April 5, 1997) is an American professional basketball player who currently plays for the Charlotte Crown of the UpShot League. They (Note: According to Sports Illustrated, AD prefers "they/them pronouns, and he/him with some of their closest male friends". This article uses singular they for consistency.) played college basketball for the Louisville Cardinals.

== College career ==
After the 2017–18 season, Durr was named the ACC Player of the Year. Durr received 29 of 31 votes for pre-season All-American, prior to the 2018–19 season. Durr finished their career at Louisville with career averages of 17.8 points, 2.2 assists, and 3.2 rebounds.

== Professional career ==
=== New York Liberty ===
==== Rookie season (2019) ====
Durr was drafted by the New York Liberty as the 2nd overall pick in the 2019 WNBA draft. They made their debut on May 24, 2019, against the Indiana Fever, scoring 8 points in 25 minutes of playing time. They played in 18 games in their rookie season, averaging 9.7 points in 26.7 minutes per game.

==== COVID-19 sidelining (2020–2021) ====
They missed the entire 2020 season due to coronavirus. Preceding the start of the 2021 WNBA season, Durr was ruled out for the season due to continued struggles with effects from COVID-19. They were placed on the full-season suspended list as a result.

==== Return to the Liberty and WNBA (2022) ====
On May 7, 2022, in what was the first game of New York Liberty's 2022 season, AD returned to the WNBA court, tallying 5.75 minutes off the bench in a victory over the Connecticut Sun. AD struggled to get minutes in their return to the Liberty, only averaging 7 minutes in 10 games. On June 8, 2022, they were traded to the Atlanta Dream.

=== Atlanta Dream ===
AD was traded to the Dream on June 8, 2022, in exchange for Megan Walker and the draft rights to Raquel Carrera.

=== UpShot League ===
On May 11, 2026, it was announced Durr had joined the Charlotte Crown of the UpShot League for their inaugural season.

== College statistics ==
| Year | Team | GP | Points | FG% | 3P% | FT% | RPG | APG | SPG | BPG | PPG |
|---|---|---|---|---|---|---|---|---|---|---|---|
| 2015–16 | Louisville | 31 | 342 | 43.2% | 36.1% | 84.1% | 2.6 | 1.4 | 1.1 | 0.4 | 11.0 |
| 2016–17 | Louisville | 36 | 692 | 42.4% | 40.5% | 78.1% | 3.4 | 1.8 | 1.3 | 0.4 | 19.2 |
| 2017–18 | Louisville | 38 | 709 | 44.3% | 41.5% | 84.8% | 3.1 | 2.3 | 1.0 | 0.2 | 18.7 |
| 2018–19 | Louisville | 35 | 742 | 43.9% | 34.3% | 81.5% | 3.8 | 3.3 | 1.5 | 0.4 | 21.2 |
| Career | | 140 | 2485 | 43.5% | 38.4% | 81.8% | 3.2 | 2.2 | 1.2 | 0.3 | 17.8 |

== WNBA career statistics ==
Legend
| GP | Games played | GS | Games started | MPG | Minutes per game | RPG | Rebounds per game |
| APG | Assists per game | SPG | Steals per game | BPG | Blocks per game | PPG | Points per game |
| TO | Turnovers per game | FG% | Field-goal percentage | 3P% | 3-point field-goal percentage | FT% | Free-throw percentage |
| **Bold** | Career best | ° | League leader |

=== Regular season ===
| Year | Team | GP | GS | MPG | FG% | 3P% | FT% | RPG | APG | SPG | BPG | TO | PPG |
|---|---|---|---|---|---|---|---|---|---|---|---|---|---|
| 2019 | New York | 18 | **15** | **26.7** | **.467** | .294 | .818 | 1.6 | **1.7** | **0.6** | **0.4** | 1.2 | 9.7 |
| 2022 | New York | 10 | 0 | 7.0 | .176 | .111 | **.875** | 0.1 | 0.4 | 0.4 | 0.2 | **0.5** | 1.4 |
| 2022 | Atlanta | 15 | 2 | 19.9 | .422 | **.458** | .774 | **1.9** | **1.7** | 0.3 | 0.1 | 1.1 | **10.7** |
| 2023 | Atlanta | **36** | 0 | 10.9 | .380 | .322 | .769 | 1.1 | 0.7 | 0.3 | 0.1 | 0.8 | 4.8 |
| Career | 3 years, 2 teams | 79 | 17 | 15.7 | .413 | .341 | .790 | 1.2 | 1.1 | 0.4 | 0.2 | 0.9 | 6.6 |

=== Playoffs ===
| Year | Team | GP | GS | MPG | FG% | 3P% | FT% | RPG | APG | SPG | BPG | TO | PPG |
|---|---|---|---|---|---|---|---|---|---|---|---|---|---|
| 2023 | Atlanta | 2 | 0 | 5.0 | .500 | .000 | 1.00 | 0.0 | 0.5 | 0.0 | 0.0 | 0.0 | 2.0 |
| Career | 1 year, 1 team | 2 | 0 | 5.0 | .500 | .000 | 1.00 | 0.0 | 0.5 | 0.0 | 0.0 | 0.0 | 2.0 |
