= Memorial Gymnasium (Vanderbilt University) =

Basketball arena at Vanderbilt University

- Memorial Gym, Memorial
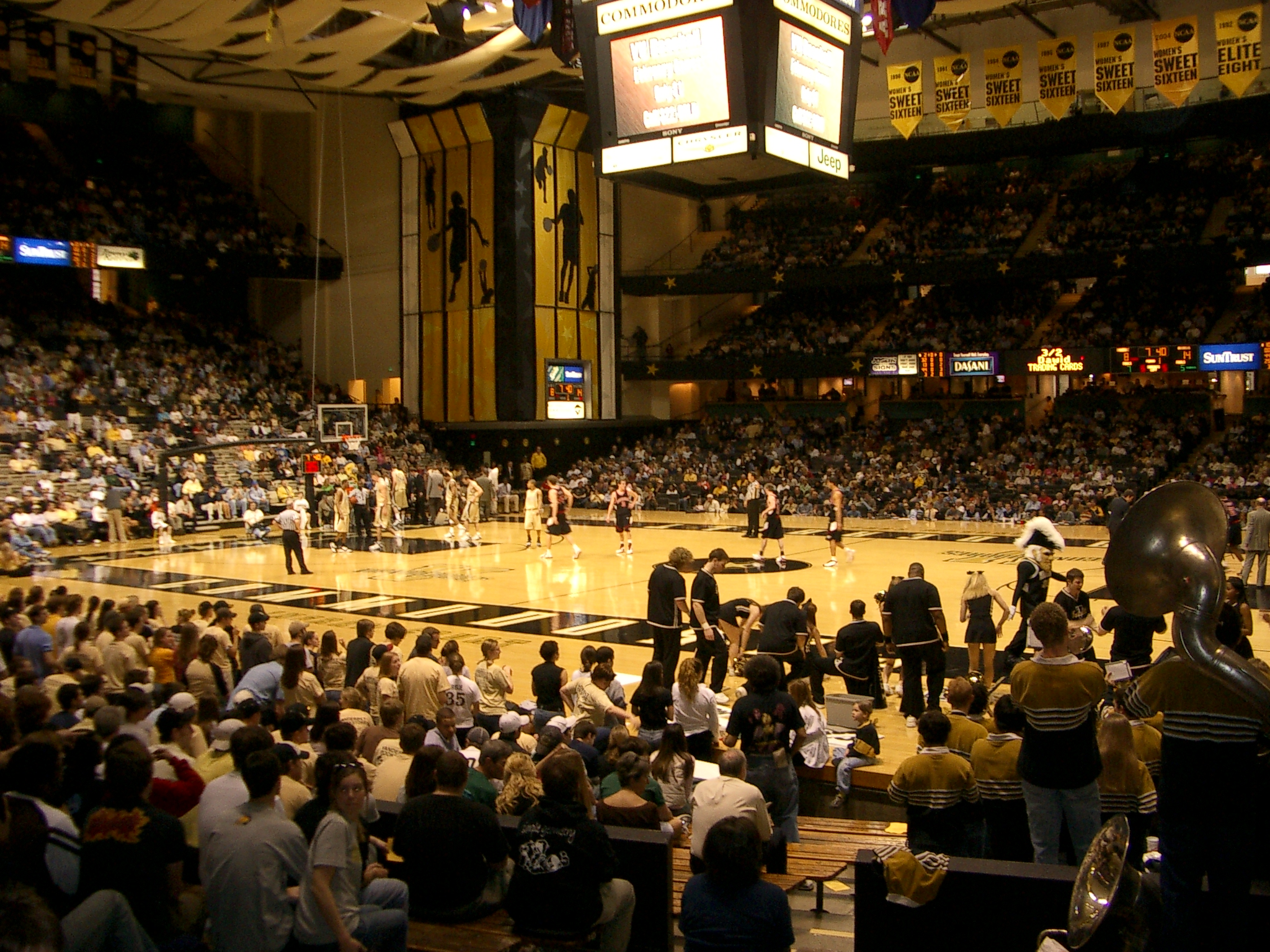
- Interactive map of Memorial Gymnasium
- Location: 25th Avenue South and Vanderbilt Place; Nashville, TN 37235
- Coordinates: 36°08′41″N 86°48′27″W
- Owner: Vanderbilt University Board of Trust
- Operator: Vanderbilt University
- Capacity: 14,316 (2004–present); 14,168 (2000–2004); 15,311 (1997–2000); 15,317 (1993–1995); 15,378 (1989–1993); 15,626 (1976–1989); 15,581 (1969–1975); 11,103 (1967–1969); 9,222 (1965–1967); 7,324 (1961–1965); 6,583 (1952–1961)
- Surface: Hardwood

Construction
- Groundbreaking: 1950
- Opened: December 6, 1952
- Renovated: 2002
- Expanded: 1965, 1967, 1969
- Cost: $1.5 million ($18.2 million in 2025 dollars)
- Architects: Edward Durell Stone & Associates; Edwin A. Keeble Associates, Inc.

Tenants
- Vanderbilt Commodores (men's and women's basketball, women's volleyball); Nashville Vibe (UpShot League) (2027–)

Memorial Gymnasium is a multi-purpose facility located in Nashville, Tennessee. Usually called Memorial Gym or simply Memorial, the building is located on the western side of the Vanderbilt University campus. It was built in 1952 and currently has a seating capacity of 14,326. It serves as home court for the school's men's and women's basketball programs and the women's volleyball program.

== Construction and unusual design ==
Memorial Gymnasium was built in the early 1950s, designed by Edwin A. Keeble. It was dedicated as the campus memorial to students and alumni killed in World War II; a plaque commemorating these people is displayed in the lobby. At the time of its construction, there was a serious discussion within the Vanderbilt community about whether the school should de-emphasize intercollegiate athletics. As a compromise, the gymnasium was built to hold only about 8,000 seats, and it would be readily adaptable to other uses.

The gymnasium floor was built up above its surroundings, more in the nature of a stage. The areas out of bounds along the sidelines were very wide, in contrast with the small facility which it replaced, where the walls were right along the sidelines and players could scrape their shoulders bringing the ball up the court. This necessitated the placement of the benches at each end of the court, which was not highly unusual at the time. In addition, each goal was originally anchored by two far-reaching beams attached to support columns, with extra support coming from cables stretching all the way to the gym's ceiling. (In the case of a backboard shatter or beam fracture, replacing the old goals would be highly difficult, compared to the usual goal setup at most venues.) The main gym, unlike the practice gyms, does not have air conditioning. Until a 2017 renovation, the shot clocks were positioned below the backboard on the player's right. A new conventional Spalding backstop, with a Daktronics shot clock above the center of the goal, was installed for the 2017–18 season.

Memorial Gym is well known for its unusual design. The end-of-the-floor bench location is now unique in major college basketball, and said to give Vanderbilt a home court advantage, since no other facility in which opponents play is arranged in such a way. The interior walls were unpainted cinder blocks prior to a major renovation in the early 2000s. The middle of the three decks has a low ceiling; when the house lights are turned off during game play gives the distinct impression of watching a Cinemascope movie of basketball.

For many years opposing coaches complained they had to coach their team from the baseline, making it very tough to communicate from the other end of the floor. This was due to the placement of the team benches on the baselines. However, beginning in the 2015–16 season, coaches were given typical coaching boxes that ran up the sideline, as in every other college gym. Now, even though their teams are still on the baseline, the coaches have the ability to roam the sideline up to the end of a regulation NCAA coaching box.

== History ==
As Southeastern Conference basketball grew in popularity and Vanderbilt established itself as a basketball power, the seating capacity proved inadequate. The gymnasium had been designed in a way which made it readily expandable, and by the mid-1960s it seated 11,103. A conference championship run in 1966 led to even more demand for seats, and by the end of the decade the facility seated 15,581. It usually sold out, especially for conference games, and in the late 1960s and early 1970s Vanderbilt was consistently in the top ten for attendance in all of college basketball, a remarkable achievement for a middle-sized private institution. The arena hosted the SEC men's basketball tournament in 1984 and 1991.

In the early 1990s the building served as the host site for a "Battle of the Boulevard" rivalry game between Lipscomb and Belmont, two other Nashville institutions with a long history of quality basketball. The game was moved to Memorial when it became apparent that demand for tickets would greatly outstrip their availability at Belmont's former home court, tiny Striplin Gymnasium. However, even event organizers themselves were shocked when the doubleheader between the women's and men's teams sold Memorial out by the halftime of the women's game. This event still (as of 2019) holds the all-time attendance record for an NAIA basketball game.

In 1967, two events lent this landmark a deeper social-historical significance. On April 7 and 8, 1967, as part of Vanderbilt’s annual student-organized Impact Symposium series, Rev. Dr. Martin Luther King, Jr., spoke at Memorial Gym on “The Future of Integration,” U.S. Senator Strom Thurmond on “Conservative Individualism,” poet Allen Ginsberg on “The Individual in American Society,” and Stokely Carmichael on “The Individual and Black Power.” The other socially momentous event occurred in Fall of 1967 when Vanderbilt's Perry Wallace broke the Southeastern Conference (SEC) racial barrier as the first African-American athlete.

== Host for post-season college basketball ==
Memorial Gym during the Women's game against Auburn on January 9, 2011.

Memorial Gym has hosted the NCAA Men's Basketball Championship on four occasions (1973 regionals, 1982/1989/1993 first- and second-round games). It has also served as home to the 1984 and 1991 SEC Men's Basketball tournaments. In the 1984 tournament, Charles Barkley's "sitting at midcourt" episode occurred after his Auburn Tigers were beaten in the tournament championship by the Kentucky Wildcats. In 1991, Alabama won the championship 88–69 over Tennessee.

It has served as an NCAA women's basketball tournament host site 12 times (first- and/or second-round games in 1989, 1990, 1991, 1992, 1994, 1995, 1996, 2001, 2002, 2006, and 2012, plus regionals in 1998).

Then-Florida State coach Pat Kennedy complained about the arrangement after his team lost a first-round NCAA Tournament game there.

The NCAA has used the newer Bridgestone Arena, a larger arena with a modern configuration in downtown Nashville, for first- and second-round men's tournament games on four more recent occasions (2000, 2003, 2005, 2012) instead of Memorial Gym.

== Renovations and recent history ==
In recent years the facility has been modernized; the addition of a press box, suites, and other amenities have reduced the seating capacity somewhat. The facility is favored by many basketball purists as an example of a facility designed primarily for that sport—although it also at times housed other facilities for the Vanderbilt athletic operation, such as a swimming pool—and has been called the "Fenway Park of College Basketball."

Memorial Gym was the site of the Jeff Lacy versus Jermain Taylor WBC super middleweight elimination bout on November 15, 2008, the first time that the gym had hosted a major professional boxing event. The undercard of this fight also saw future WBC Heavyweight World Champion Deontay Wilder make his professional debut.

== See also ==
- List of NCAA Division I basketball arenas
