= Te'a Cooper =

American basketball player (born 1997)

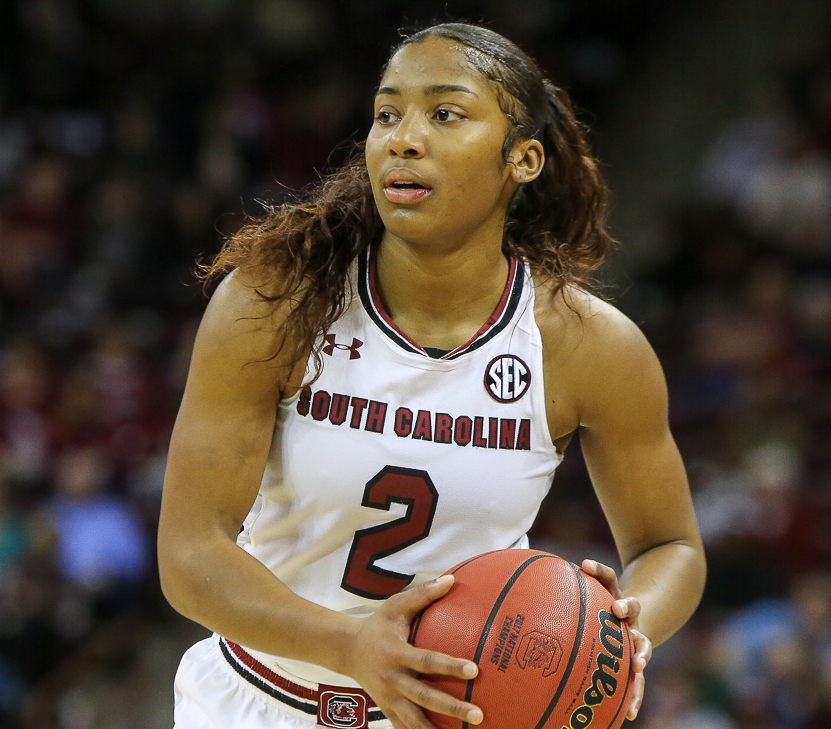

Personal information
- Born: April 16, 1997 (age 29) Newark, New Jersey, U.S.
- Listed height: 5 ft 8 in (1.73 m)
- Listed weight: 170 lb (77 kg)

Career information
- High school: McEachern (Powder Springs, Georgia)
- College: Tennessee (2015–2017); South Carolina (2017–2019); Baylor (2019–2020)
- WNBA draft: 2020: 2nd round, 18th overall pick
- Drafted by: Phoenix Mercury
- Playing career: 2020–present
- Position: Point guard

Career history
- 2020–2021: Los Angeles Sparks
- 2025: Tarbes Gespe Bigorre
- 2025: Liaoning Henye

Career highlights
- First-team All-Big 12 (2020); SEC All-Freshman Team (2016); McDonald's All-American Game Co-MVP (2015)
- Stats at Basketball Reference

Te'a Omari Cooper (born April 16, 1997) is an American professional basketball player who played for the Los Angeles Sparks of the Women's National Basketball Association (WNBA) and is currently playing in China's Women's Chinese Basketball Association (WCBA). She played college basketball for the Baylor Lady Bears, South Carolina Gamecocks, and the Tennessee Volunteers.

== Early life ==
Cooper played high school basketball for McEachern High School. In her freshman year, McEachern High School was undefeated as they finished 33–0. She shot 65 percent from the field. She won three Georgia 6A State titles in 2012, 2014 and 2015, and she was the co-MVP of the 2015 McDonald's All-America game.

== Professional career ==
On April 17, 2020, the Phoenix Mercury selected Cooper as the 18th pick in the 2020 WNBA draft. Due to the global pandemic from COVID-19, Phoenix Mercury were forced to cut some of their players from the team in May 2020, including Te'a Cooper. The Los Angeles Sparks team took this as an opportunity to transfer some of the Phoenix Mercury players to play for them, and Cooper was picked to play as a point guard. From her previous college 3-point range (56-of-135 for 41.5%), can prove to the Sparks coach, Derek Fisher, how well of a point guard and shooter she can provide for his team, despite her being a rookie. Cooper continues to gain experience and skills from the other players in the Los Angeles Sparks team. Cooper's current average for about 17 minutes in a game consists of making around 7.3 points and having about 2 assists. On August 13, 2020, the Los Angeles Sparks played against the Washington Mystics, leading Cooper to have one of her best games of the season with 10 points (5-of-6 shooting) with 3 assists, all within 19 minutes of playing time. After a 3-year hiatus, she would make her return to professional basketball in December 2024 by signing with Tarbes Gespe Bigorre of a French Women's Basketball League for the 2025 season.

== Career statistics ==
Legend
GP	Games played	GS	Games started	MPG	Minutes per game	RPG	Rebounds per game
APG	Assists per game	SPG	Steals per game	BPG	Blocks per game	PPG	Points per game
TO	Turnovers per game	FG%	Field-goal percentage	3P%	3-point field-goal percentage	FT%	Free-throw percentage
**Bold**	Career best	°	League leader

WNBA record

=== WNBA ===
==== Regular season ====
Year	Team	GP	GS	MPG	FG%	3P%	FT%	RPG	APG	SPG	BPG	TO	PPG
2020	Los Angeles	20	3	17.0	**.451**	**.344**	**.765**	1.0	**2.0**	0.7	0.0	**1.5**	7.0
2021	Los Angeles	**31**	**13**	**22.0**	.379	.324	.750	**1.7**	1.4	**0.9**	**0.2**	1.8	**9.1**
Career		51	16	20.1	.401	.330	.754	1.5	1.6	0.8	0.1	1.7	8.2

==== Playoffs ====
Year	Team	GP	GS	MPG	FG%	3P%	FT%	RPG	APG	SPG	BPG	TO	PPG
2020	Los Angeles	1	0	21.0	.250	.500	.000	0.0	2.0	1.0	0.0	3.0	3.0
Career		1	0	21.0	.250	.500	.000	0.0	2.0	1.0	0.0	3.0	3.0

=== College ===
Legend
GP	Games played	GS	Games started	MPG	Minutes per game
FG%	Field goal percentage	3P%	3-point field goal percentage	FT%	Free throw percentage
RPG	Rebounds per game	APG	Assists per game	SPG	Steals per game
BPG	Blocks per game	PPG	Points per game	**Bold**	Career high

Year	Team	GP	Points	FG%	3P%	FT%	RPG	APG	SPG	BPG	PPG
2015-16	Tennessee	**36**	311	36.9%	26.0%	72.2%	1.9	2.1	1.2	-	8.6
2016-17	Tennessee	Medical redshirt									
2017-18	South Carolina	Sat due to NCAA transfer rules									
2018-19	South Carolina	30	357	42.9%	28.9%	**76.2%**	**2.5**	2.2	1.1	**0.3**	11.9
2019-20	Baylor	30	**408**	**43.8%**	**41.5%**	73.0%	2.3	**4.6**	**1.9**	0.1	**13.6**
Career		96	1076	41.2%	33.2%	74.1%	2.2	2.9	1.4	0.1	11.2

== Personal life ==
Te'a Cooper is the daughter of Omar and Kindall Cooper. She has three siblings: Mia (Imani) and twins Sharife and Omar. Sharife was drafted by the Atlanta Hawks in 2021.

Te'a dated Dwight Howard and the pair became engaged in 2019. In 2021, Cooper and Howard parted ways. Cooper once dated New Orleans Saints running back Alvin Kamara. Cooper and Kamara welcomed a baby girl, Stori Kamara, on December 25, 2022.
