= Zawyer Sports & Entertainment =

Sports management company based in Jacksonville, Florida

- Type: Private
- Industry: Sports management
- Founded: 2018; 8 years ago
- Founder: Andy Kaufmann
- Headquarters: 3605 Philips Hwy; Jacksonville, Florida, USA
- Area served: United States
- Key people: Andy Kaufmann (Chief Executive Officer); Scott Einhorn (President)
- Services: Professional sports team ownership; League operations; Facility management; Sports marketing and branding
- Divisions: Ice hockey operations; Baseball operations; Basketball operations; Soccer operations; Marketing and media
- Subsidiaries: Jacksonville Icemen; Savannah Ghost Pirates; Charlotte Checkers; Greensboro Gargoyles; Gastonia Ghost Peppers; Mobile Mysticks; Huntsville Havoc; UpShot League; Kaufy Baseball, LLC; 32 Degrees Marketing
- Website: www.ZawyerSports.com

Zawyer Sports & Entertainment is an American sports management and entertainment company based in Jacksonville, Florida. It owns, operates, and manages professional teams in ice hockey, baseball, women's basketball, and soccer, along with related facilities and marketing ventures, primarily in the Southeastern United States.

== History ==
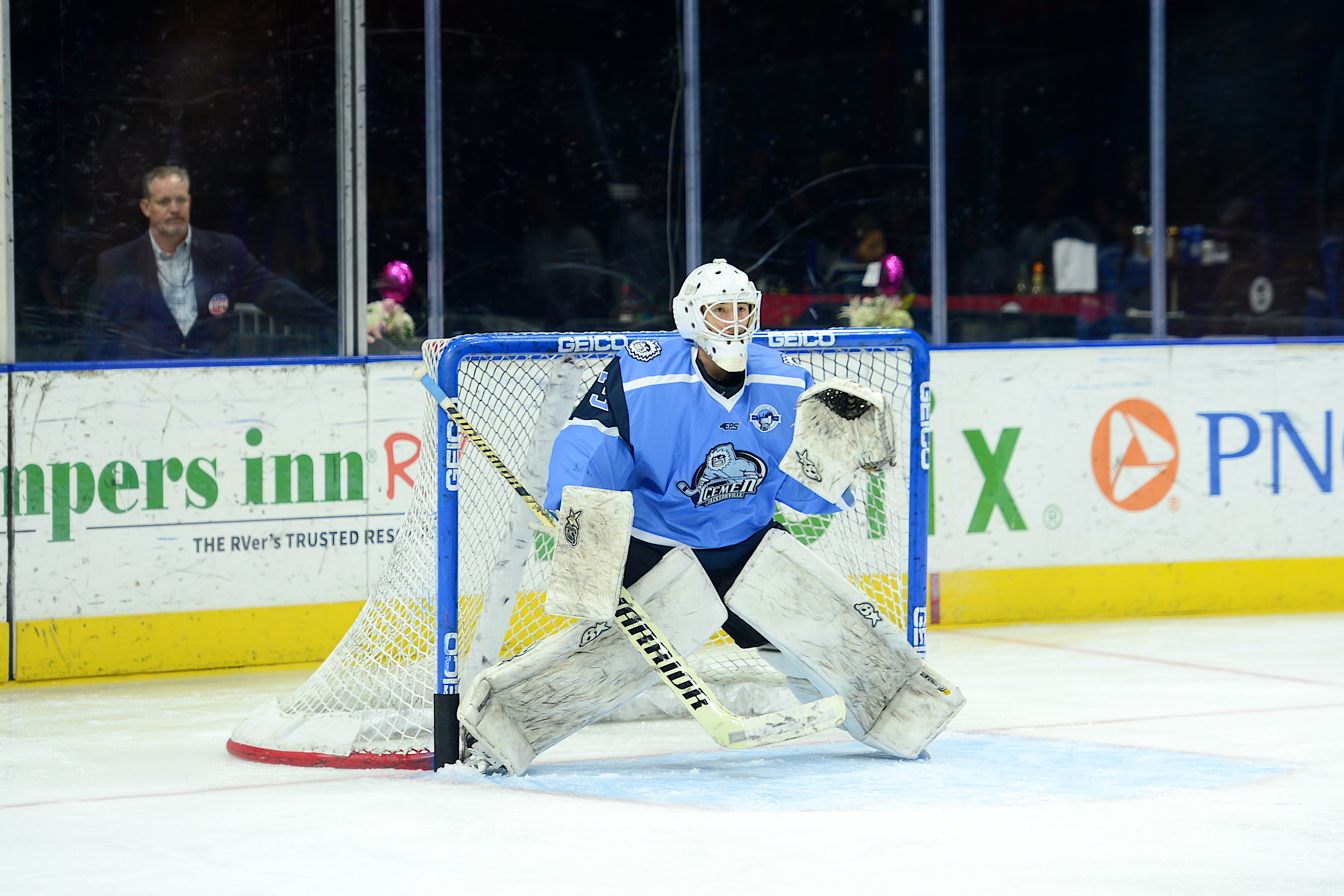
Denis Tsaruk in goal for the Jacksonville Icemen.

=== Founding (2018) ===
Zawyer Sports & Entertainment was founded in 2018 by Andy Kaufmann. The company name is derived from the names of his sons, Zach and Sawyer. In July 2018, Kaufmann and a group of Jacksonville-based investors purchased the Jacksonville Icemen of the ECHL, making the Icemen the only locally owned professional sports team in Jacksonville at the time.

=== Early expansion (2019–2021) ===
In 2019, Zawyer expanded from single-team ownership into a multi-team management company by acquiring the Fort Myers Miracle, a High-A affiliate of the Minnesota Twins. Kaufmann, through Kaufy Baseball, LLC., took controlling interest, and the team was rebranded as the Fort Myers Mighty Mussels for the 2020 season.

=== Growth of Hockey Operations (2022–2024) ===
Locations of teams owned or operated by Zawyer Sports & Entertainment
Multiple Baseball Basketball Hockey

| Between 2022 and 2024, Zawyer expanded its hockey operations significantly. The company launched the Savannah Ghost Pirates in the ECHL, an expansion franchise approved in January 2021 that brought professional minor-league hockey to the new Savannah Arena (later Enmarket Arena) beginning with the 2022–23 ECHL season.

In July 2024, Zawyer acquired a controlling interest in the Charlotte Checkers of the American Hockey League, with longtime owner Michael Kahn retaining a minority stake. In June 2025, Shawn Lynch was appointed president of the Checkers, succeeding Tera Black.

In October 2024, the ECHL approved Zawyer’s expansion franchise in Greensboro, North Carolina, set to begin play in the 2025–26 season. The team was later named the Greensboro Gargoyles. The franchise is partly owned by former NHL players Paul Bissonnette, Ryan Whitney, and Keith Yandle of the Spittin' Chiclets podcast at Barstool Sports.

=== Diversification of Ventures (2022–2025) ===
In January 2022, majority ownership of the Mighty Mussels transferred to John Martin, with Kaufy Baseball, LLC remaining as a principal owner under his management.

Zawyer expanded beyond team ownership into facilities and related businesses. This includes the acquisition and operation of Community First Igloo, a multi-purpose ice facility in Jacksonville featuring ice sheets and training spaces. In late 2022, Zawyer acquired C3 Media Group (later rebranded as 32 Degrees Marketing), expanding its marketing and creative services capabilities.

In addition to owned properties, Zawyer operates and consults for other sports ventures, including the Tahoe Knight Monsters, Augusta Lynx, Ghost Pirates Ice Cove, and Jacksonville Armada FC, with the latter under an operating partnership agreement. These engagements involve management of operations without full ownership.

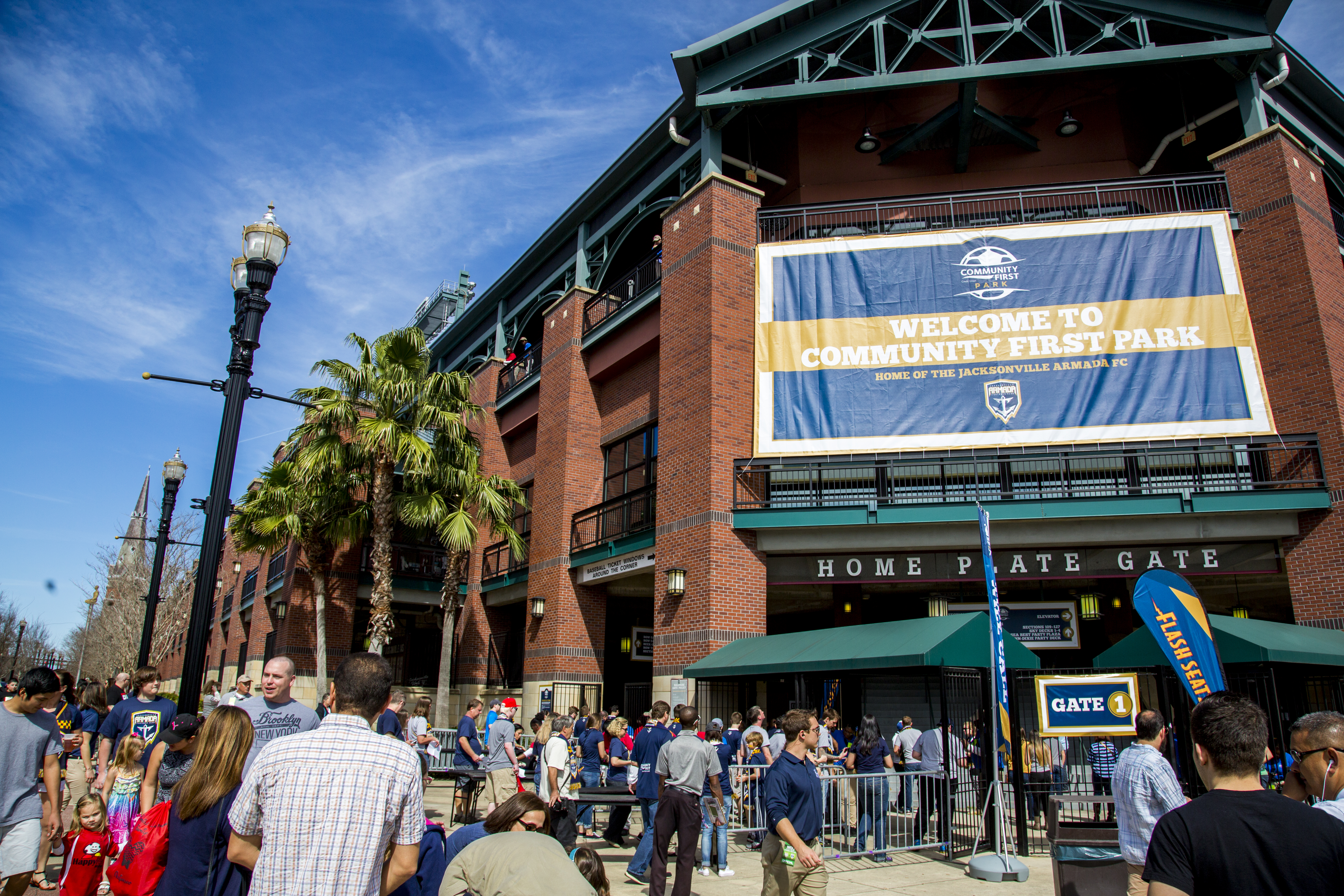
Community First Park, early home of Jacksonville Armada FC.

In 2024, Zawyer was awarded an expansion franchise in the Atlantic League of Professional Baseball in Gastonia, North Carolina, which became the Gastonia Ghost Peppers.

In November 2025, Zawyer entered into a partnership with Jacksonville Armada FC. The partnership involves operational management, including ticketing, marketing, and stadium operations, while the club pursues entry into MLS NEXT Pro. Zawyer also owns and operates a forthcoming SPHL franchise in Mobile, Alabama, the Mobile Mysticks, which will begin play in 2027. The team revives the name of the original Mobile Mysticks franchise that competed from 1995 to 2002.

=== Launch of the UpShot League and other moves (2025–present) ===
In January 2025, Zawyer announced the creation of the UpShot League, a professional women's basketball league planned to begin in May 2026. The league is headquartered in Jacksonville and will include teams in Jacksonville, Savannah, Charlotte, and Greensboro, with expansions to Baltimore and Nashville planned for 2027. Former WNBA president Donna Orender served as the first commissioner for the league.

In 2026, Zawyer expanded its involvement in ice hockey through a partnership with the Tri-City Storm of the United States Hockey League and the acquisition of a controlling interest in the Huntsville Havoc. In June, the Tri-City Storm announced a partnership under which Zawyer would oversee business operations, including marketing, venue operations, and ticketing, while the team's existing leadership would continue to manage hockey operations. Later, in September, Zawyer acquired a controlling interest in the Huntsville Havoc of the SPHL, with former majority owners Keith and Becky Jeffries retaining minority interests and continuing their involvement with the organization. The transactions added to Zawyer's portfolio of professional sports teams and expanded its presence in minor league ice hockey.

== Sports properties ==
Sport	Team	League	Relationship
Ice hockey	Jacksonville Icemen	ECHL	Owner
Ice hockey	Greensboro Gargoyles	ECHL	Owner
Ice hockey	Savannah Ghost Pirates	ECHL	Owner
Ice hockey	Augusta Lynx	ECHL	Operator; part owner
Ice hockey	Tahoe Knight Monsters	ECHL	Operator; part owner
Ice hockey	Charlotte Checkers	AHL	Controlling interest
Ice hockey	Huntsville Havoc	SPHL	Controlling interest
Ice hockey	Mobile Mysticks	SPHL	Owner
Ice hockey	Tri-City Storm	USHL	Operator
Baseball	Fort Myers Mighty Mussels	Single-A	Minority owner (formerly majority)
Baseball	Gastonia Ghost Peppers	Atlantic League	Owner
Women's basketball	Charlotte Crown	UpShot League	Owner
Women's basketball	Greensboro Groove	UpShot League	Owner
Women's basketball	Jacksonville Waves	UpShot League	Owner
Women's basketball	Savannah Steel	UpShot League	Owner
Women's basketball	Baltimore Starlings	UpShot League	Owner
Women's basketball	UpShot New England	UpShot League	Owner
Women's basketball	UpShot Tampa	UpShot League	Owner
Women's basketball	Nashville Vibe	UpShot League	Operator
Soccer	Jacksonville Armada FC	MLS Next Pro	Operator
