= Lindsey Pulliam =

American basketball player (born 1999)

No. 10 – Jacksonville Waves
- Position: Point guard / shooting guard
- League: UpShot League

Personal information
- Born: August 6, 1999 (age 27) Silver Spring, Maryland
- Listed height: 5 ft 10 in (1.78 m)
- Listed weight: 160 lb (73 kg)

Career information
- High school: Our Lady of Good Counsel (Olney, Maryland)
- College: Northwestern (2017–2021)
- WNBA draft: 2021: 3rd round, 27th overall pick
- Drafted by: Atlanta Dream
- Playing career: 2021–present

Career history
- 2021–2022: Elazığ İl Özel İdarespor
- 2022–2023: CB Estudiantes
- 2023: Valur
- 2023–2026: Slávia Banská Bystrica
- 2026–present: Jacksonville Waves

Career highlights
- 2× First-team All-Big Ten (2019, 2020); Second-team All-Big Ten (2021)
- Stats at Basketball Reference
Medals
Women's basketball
Representing United States
Pan American Games
Silver medal – second place	2019 Lima	Team

Lindsey Denise Pulliam (born August 6, 1999) is an American professional basketball player for the Jacksonville Waves of the UpShot League, an American professional women's basketball league. She was drafted by the Atlanta Dream in the third round of the 2021 WNBA draft.

Pulliam was born in Washington, D.C. She grew up in Silver Spring, Maryland and attended high school at Our Lady of Good Counsel in Olney, Maryland.

== Northwestern ==
Pulliam was a four-star recruit going into college. She played college basketball at Northwestern University. Over four years, she started 123 games and averaged 16.5 points per game on a .379 shooting percentage. She had 120 steals and 25 blocks.

Pulliam is only the third Northwestern player to score 2,000 points. She was the fastest Wildcat to 1,000 points. She guided Northwestern to a regular-season Big 10 title in 2020 and an NCAA Tournament berth in 2021, when the team reached the Round of 32 for the first time since 1993. She was named to the All-Big Ten First Team in 2020 and the All-Big Ten Second Team in 2021. She was an AP All American Honorable Mention in 2020. She was a 2021 finalist for the Wooden Award.

=== Northwestern statistics ===
Ratios
Year	Team	GP	FG%	3P%	FT%	RBG	APG	BPG	SPG	PPG
2017-18	Northwestern	32	40.4%	23.1%	81.8%	3.41	1.84	0.19	0.69	14.97
2018-19	Northwestern	36	36.8%	18.2%	78.4%	3.61	1.83	0.19	0.94	16.53
2019-20	Northwestern	30	38.6%	35.0%	73.1%	4.67	2.30	0.17	1.20	18.77
2020-21	Northwestern	25	36.0%	24.5%	66.0%	5.32	2.20	0.28	1.12	15.52
Career		123	37.9%	26.6%	75.6%	4.16	2.02	0.20	0.98	16.46

Totals
Year	Team	GP	FG	FGA	3P	3PA	FT	FTA	REB	A	BK	ST	PTS
2017-18	Northwestern	32	179	443	9	39	112	137	109	59	6	22	479
2018-19	Northwestern	36	218	593	14	77	145	185	130	66	7	34	595
2019-20	Northwestern	30	202	523	42	120	117	160	140	69	5	36	563
2020-21	Northwestern	25	150	417	24	98	64	97	133	55	7	28	388
Career		123	749	1976	89	334	438	579	512	249	25	120	2025

== Professional career ==
Pulliam was drafted by the Atlanta Dream in the 2021 WNBA draft. She was cut on May 9 of that year.

In August 2021, she signed with Elazığ İl Özel İdarespor of the Turkish Women's Basketball Super League (KBSL) where she averaged 14.7 points, 3.5 rebounds and 1.8 assists in 12 KBSL games. In 7 EuroCup games, she averaged 13.9 points, 5.9 rebounds and 2.9 assists.

Prior to the 2022–2023 season, Pulliam signed with CB Estudiantes of the Spanish top-tier Liga Femenina de Baloncesto.

In September 2023, Pulliam signed with reigning Úrvalsdeild kvenna champions Valur.

In December 2023, Pulliam signed with Slávia Banská Bystrica.

In 2026, Pulliam signed with the UpShot League, a brand new American professional women's basketball league. She plays for the Jacksonville Waves.

== National team career ==
Pulliam won a silver medal for Team USA at the 2019 Pan American Games. During the tournament, she averaged 3.7 and 1.3 rebounds.
