= Mark Walsh =

Mark Walsh may refer to:

- Mark Walsh (businessman) (born 1954), American entrepreneur, venture capitalist, and political activist
- Mark Walsh (cricketer) (born 1972), Australian cricketer
- Mark Walsh (darts player) (born 1965), English darts player
- Mark Walsh (jockey) (born 1986), Irish jockey
- Mark E. Walsh, US deputy Chief of Protocol
