= 2015 McDonald's All-American Girls Game =

East	West
89	87
	1st half	2nd half	Total
East	46	43	89
West	43	44	87
- Date: April 1, 2015
- Venue: United Center, Chicago, Illinois
- MVP: Marina Mabrey; Te'a Cooper
- Network: ESPNU

McDonald's All-American

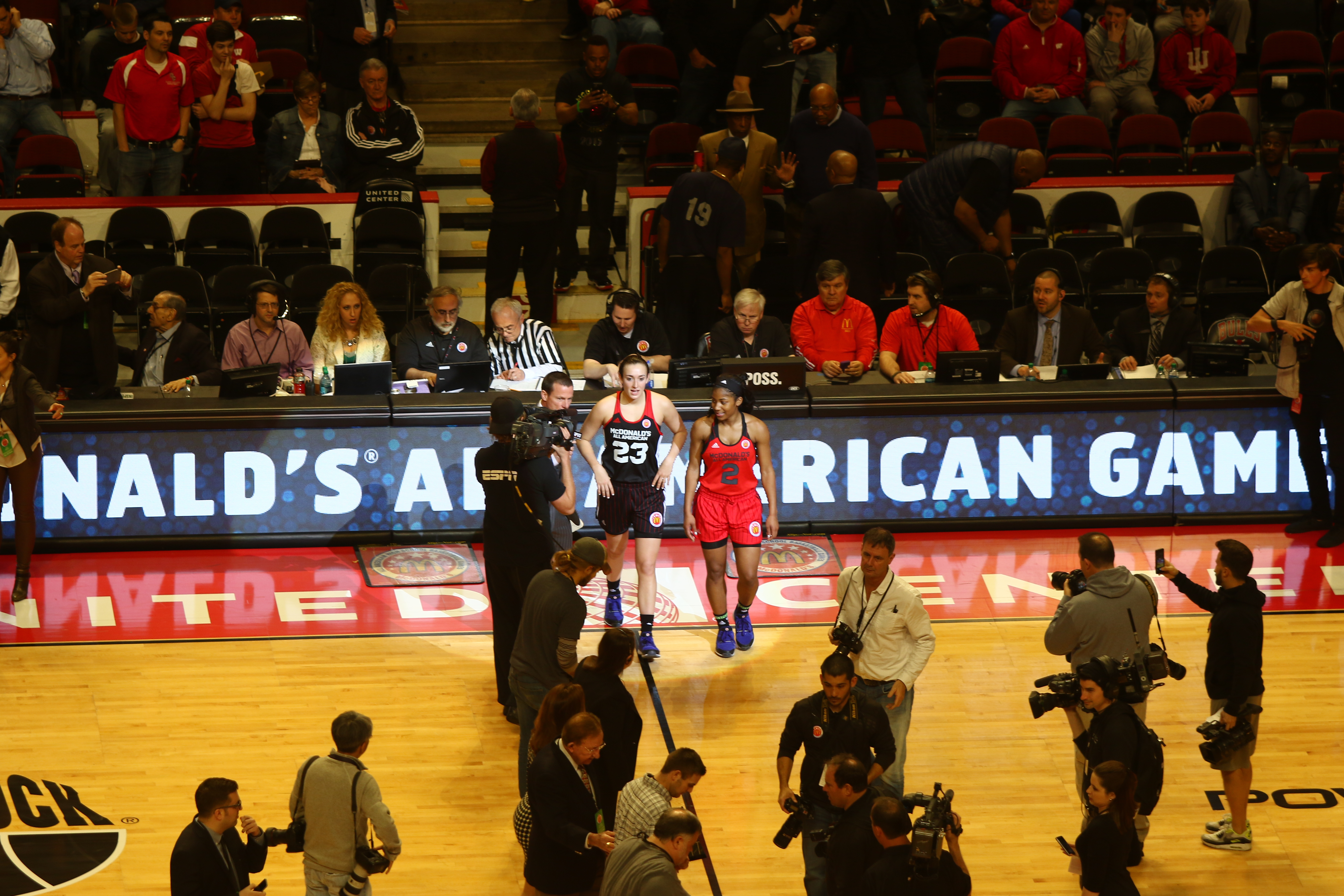
Marina Mabrey and Te’a Cooper, the co-MVPs of the 2015 McDonald’s All-American Girls Game

The 2015 McDonald's All-American Girls Game is an All-Star basketball game that was played on April 1, 2015, at the United Center in Chicago, Illinois, home of the Chicago Bulls. The game's rosters featured the best and most highly recruited high school girls graduating in 2015. The game is the 14th annual version of the McDonald's All-American Game first played in 2002.

== 2015 Game ==
The 2015 game was a game of runs. The West jumped out to a huge lead, then the East roared back and took over and made it a close game the rest of the way. The West team started the game on a 16–4 run by buckets from Te'a Cooper and Katie Lou Samuelson, but the East flipped the switch using Marina Mabrey, Asia Durr, and Taylor Murray to lead their charge. The East lead 81=69 with just under 3 minutes left in the game, but the West made one last charge and got it to 3 points from a Samuelson 3-pointer with 32.7 seconds left. Durr made a couple of free throws with 6.1 seconds left to seal the victory for the East.

This was the highest scoring girls' game in the 14-year history.

== Rosters ==
=== 2015 East Roster ===
ESPNW 100 Rank	Name	Height	Position	Hometown	High school	College choice
23	De'Janae Boykin	6–2	F	Charles Herbert Flowers High School	Springdale, Maryland	Connecticut
26	Taja Cole	5–7	G	L. C. Bird High School	Richmond, Virginia	Louisville
2	Asia Durr	5–10	G	St. Pius X Catholic High School	Douglasville, Georgia	Louisville
14	Brianna Fraser	6–3	F	South Shore Victory Collegiate High School	Brooklyn, New York	Maryland
60	Sam Fuering	6–3	F	Immaculate Conception High School	Wanaque, New Jersey	Louisville
25	Kiah Gillespie	6–1	F	The Capital Preparatory Magnet School	Meriden, Connecticut	Maryland
24	Marina Mabrey	5–10	G/F	Manasquan High School	Belmar, New Jersey	Notre Dame
20	Beatrice Mompremier	6–4	C	Miami Senior High School	Miami, Florida	Baylor
55	Taylor Murray	5–6	G	Annapolis Area Christian School	Odenton, Maryland	Kentucky
10	Arike Ogunbowale	5–9	G	Divine Savior Holy Angels High School	Milwaukee, Wisconsin	Notre Dame
13	Ali Patberg	5–11	G	Columbus North High School	Columbus, Indiana	Notre Dame
48	Deja Strother	6–4	C	Inglemoor High School	Kenmore, Washington	Washington

=== 2015 West Roster ===
ESPNW 100 Rank	Name	Height	Position	Hometown	High school	College choice
8	Kristine Anigwe	6–3	C	Desert Vista High School	Phoenix, Arizona	California
11	Kalani Brown	6–5	C	Salmen High School	Slidell, Louisiana	Baylor
6	Napheesa Collier	6–1	F	Incarnate Word Academy	O'Fallon, Missouri	Connecticut
12	Te'a Cooper	5–8	G	McEachern High School	Powder Springs, Georgia	Tennessee
28	Sophie Cunningham	6–1	G	Rock Bridge High School	Columbia, Missouri	Missouri
22	Ashley Hearn	6–3	F	Sachse High School	Rowlett, Texas	UCLA
7	Lashann Higgs	5–9	G	Cedar Ridge High School	Round Rock, Texas	Texas
16	Jordan Hosey	6–2	F	Manvel High School	Pearland, Texas	Texas
9	Kyra Lambert	5–8	G	Samuel Clemens High School	Cibolo, Texas	Duke
1	Katie Lou Samuelson	6–3	G/F	Mater Dei High School	Huntington Beach, California	Connecticut
17	Destinee Walker	5–9	G/F	Lake Highland Preparatory School	Orlando, Florida	North Carolina
21	Stephanie Watts	5–9	G	Weddington High School	Wesley Chapel, North Carolina	North Carolina

=== Coaches ===
The East team was coached by:

- Head Coach — John Hutchcraft of Guy-Perkins High School (Guy, Arkansas)

The West team was coached by:

- Head Coach - Emery Roy of Rocky Mountain High School (Meridian, Idaho)

== Game ==
ESPNU

April 1, 2015
06:00

East	89–87	West
Scoring by half: 46–43, 43–44
Pts: Asia Durr; Taylor Murray 14; Asts: Ali Patberg 5		Pts: Te'a Cooper 21; Rebs: Napheesa Collier 10

United Center, Chicago, IL

== See also ==
2015 McDonald's All-American Boys Game
