= Ugonne Onyiah =

American basketball player (born 2002)

No. 1 – Indiana Fever
- Position: Forward
- League: WNBA

Personal information
- Born: August 12, 2002 (age 24) Eastvale, California, U.S.
- Listed height: 6 ft 3 in (1.91 m)

Career information
- High school: Eleanor Roosevelt (Eastvale, California)
- College: California (2020-2025)
- WNBA draft: 2025: undrafted

Career history
- 2025-2026: BC Namur-Capitale
- 2026: Charlotte Crown
- 2026–present: Indiana Fever
- Stats at WNBA.com
- Stats at Basketball Reference

Ugonne Michelle Onyiah (born August 12, 2002) is an American professional basketball player for the Indiana Fever of the Women's National Basketball Association (WNBA). She played college basketball for the California Golden Bears. She played for Eleanor Roosevelt High School in Eastvale, California where she classified as a five-star recruit by ESPN.

== College ==
During her fifth and final season, Onyiah led the ACC in field goal percentage (60.3%) and was ranked second in double-doubles (8). She has the sixth highest career FGP (54.0%) and fifth highest career blocks (143) of all-time for the Golden Bears.

== Professional career ==
=== Charlotte Crown (2026) ===
Onyiah played for the Charlotte Crown during the league's inaugural season, averaging 9.6 points, 6.9 rebounds, and 1.1 blocks per game in 21 games.

=== Indiana Fever (2026–present) ===
On July 31, 2026, Onyiah signed a player development contract with the Indiana Fever of the Women's National Basketball Association (WNBA).

== Career statistics ==
Legend
GP	Games played	GS	Games started	MPG	Minutes per game	RPG	Rebounds per game
APG	Assists per game	SPG	Steals per game	BPG	Blocks per game	PPG	Points per game
TO	Turnovers per game	FG%	Field-goal percentage	3P%	3-point field-goal percentage	FT%	Free-throw percentage
**Bold**	Career best	°	League leader

=== WNBA ===
WNBA regular season statistics
Year	Team	GP	GS	MPG	FG%	3P%	FT%	RPG	APG	SPG	BPG	TO	PPG
2026	Indiana	2	0	6.5	.333	—	.400	2.5	.0	.0	.0	1.0	2.0
**Career**	1 year, 1 team	2	0	6.5	.333	—	.400	2.5	.0	.0	.0	1.0	2.0
