= Savannah Leprechauns =

Future Indoor Football League team in Savannah, Georgia

Logo

General information
- Founded: 2026
- Headquartered: Savannah, Georgia at Enmarket Arena
- Colors: Green, Blue, White
- Website: www.SavannahIndoorFootball.com

Personnel
- Owners: Bryan Caracciolla & George Mathis III
- General manager: Troy Waranka
- Head coach: Clay Harrell
- President: George Mathis III

Home fields
- Enmarket Arena (2027–present)

League / conference affiliations
- Indoor Football League (2027–present)

The Savannah Leprechauns are a professional indoor football team based in Savannah, Georgia, that will compete in the Indoor Football League (IFL). The Leprechauns will begin play in the 2027 season as an expansion team and will play their home games at Enmarket Arena.

== History ==
On August 6, 2026, WJCL first reported that an Indoor Football League team would be coming to Savannah and Enmarket Arena for the 2027 season, with further details being announced the following week. The announcement was made on August 15, with a name-the-team contest following shortly thereafter. Finalists were the Savannah Wings, Savannah Revolution, Savannah Leprechauns and Savannah Swarm; the last of those was later withdrawn out of respect for the Georgia Swarm of the National Lacrosse League.

On September 24, the team unveiled its Leprechauns name, logo, color scheme, inaugural head coach in Clay Harrell and inaugural player signing in Savannah State alumnus Tony Rountree, Jr.
