= UpShot League =

Professional women's developmental basketball league in the United States

The UpShot League
- Sport: Women's basketball
- Founded: January 27, 2025; 21 months ago Jacksonville, Florida, U.S.
- Founder: Andy Kaufmann; Mark Walsh; Donna Orender
- First season: 2026
- Commissioner: Taj McWilliams-Franklin (Deputy Commissioner / Acting)
- No. of teams: 8
- Country: United States
- Headquarters: 3605 Philips Hwy, Jacksonville, Florida, U.S.
- Continent: North America
- Most recent champion: Charlotte Crown (2026)
- Website: UpShotLeague.com
- 2026–27

The UpShot League (often stylized as UPSHOT or Upshot) is a professional women's basketball league in the United States. Former WNBA player Taj McWilliams-Franklin serves as the deputy commissioner of the league.

The league began play on May 15, 2026, with four inaugural teams. The UpShot League's regular-season schedule will consist of 34 games, including 17 at home and 17 on the road. The league has announced plans to hold a player draft following the 2027 WNBA draft.

== History ==
=== Launch ===
On January 27, 2025, Zawyer Sports & Entertainment CEO Andy Kaufmann announced the creation of the UpShot League, a professional women's basketball league based in the southeastern United States to provide opportunities for players unable to secure WNBA roster spots. Former WNBA president Donna Orender was named commissioner of the league.

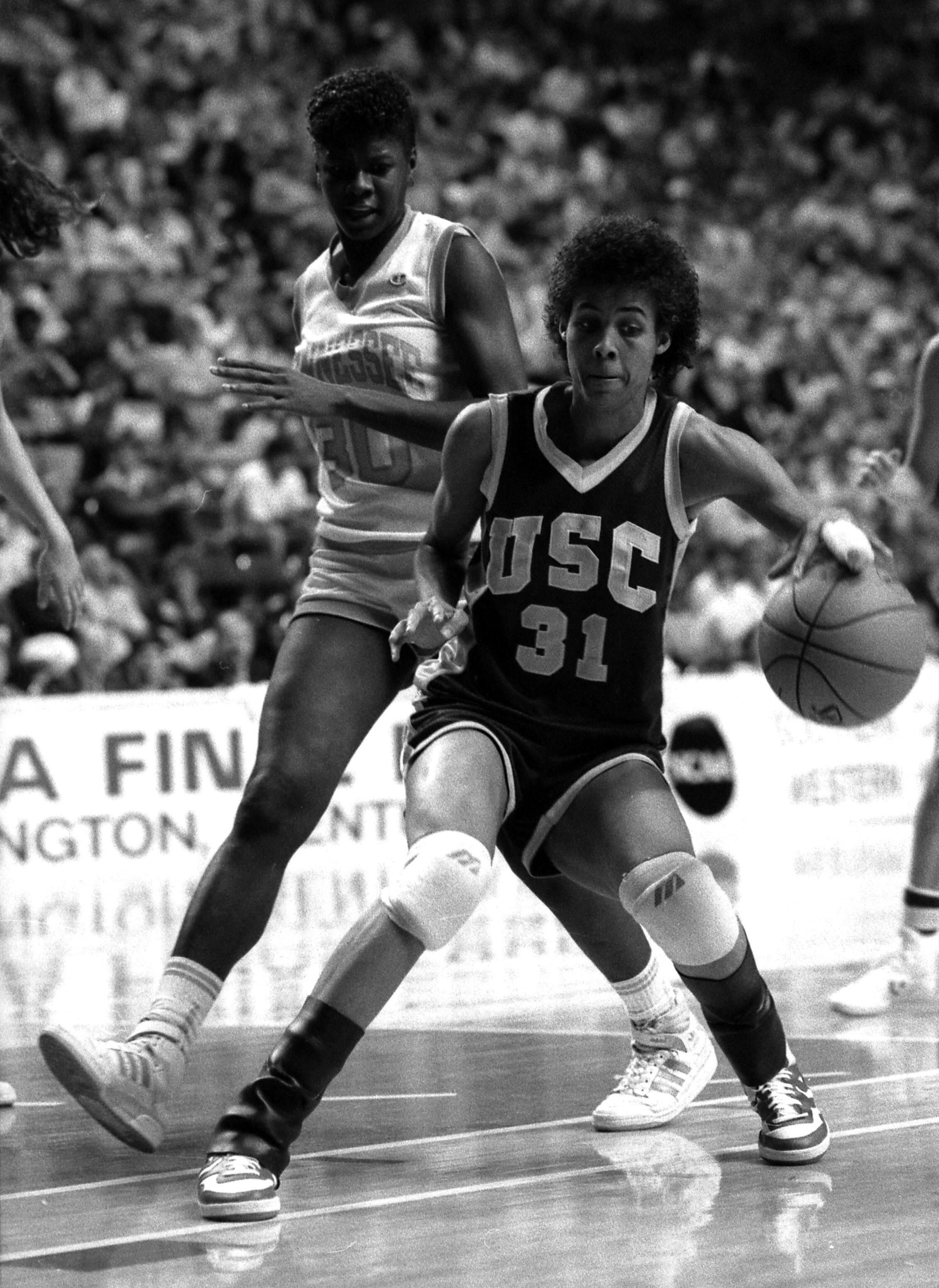
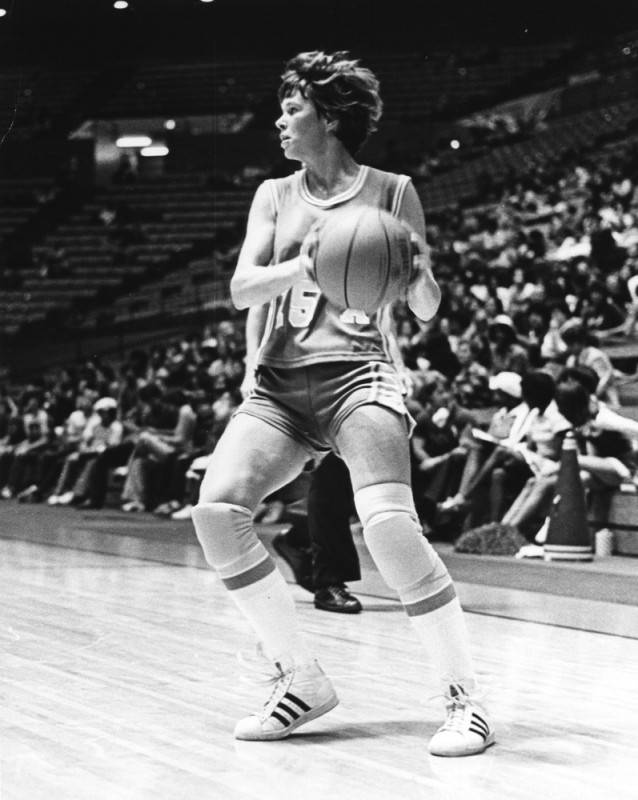
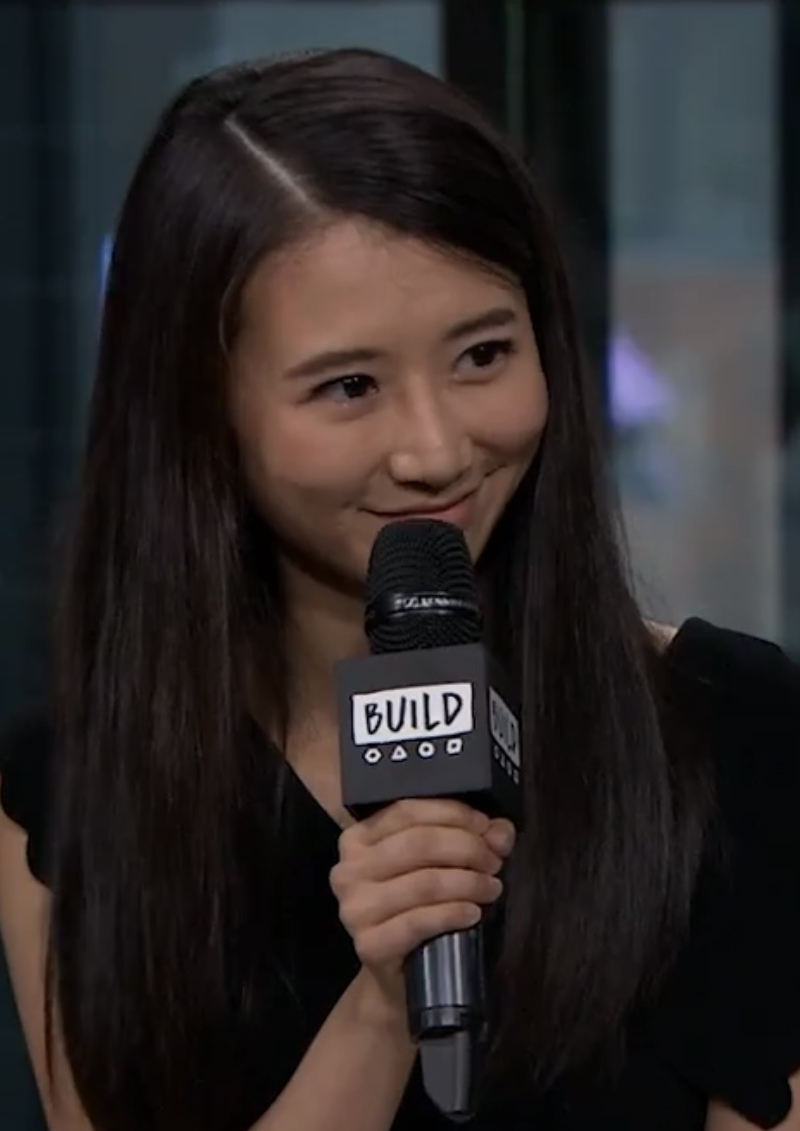
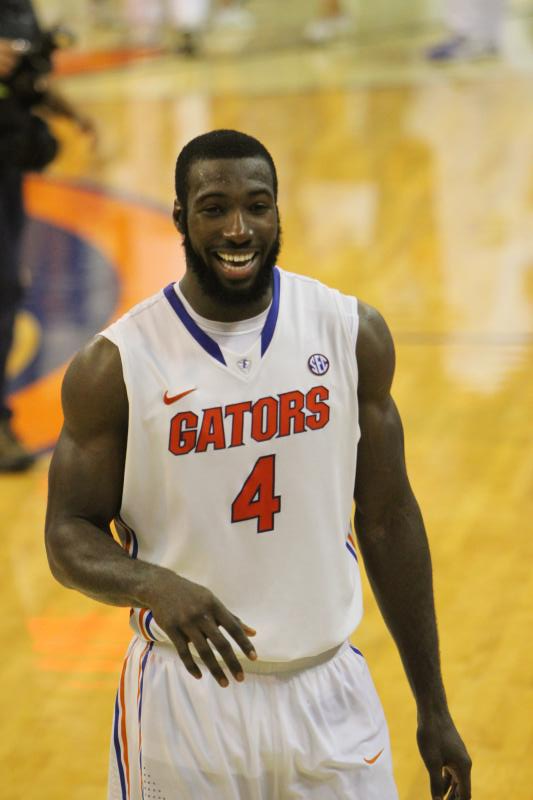
Clockwise from top left: Cheryl Miller; Ann Meyers Drysdale; Patric Young; Annie Q. Riegel

Early investors included Cheryl Miller, Ann Meyers Drysdale, Seniesa Estrada, Patric Young, and Annie Q. Riegel. In March 2026, Tamika Catchings joined the league as an advisor and investor.

The league established inaugural franchises in Jacksonville, Savannah, Greensboro, and Charlotte for its 2026 debut season. The teams were later named the Waves, Steel, Groove, and Crown, respectively.

=== Inaugural season build-up ===
The league announced its inaugural game would be played May 15, 2026 between the Jacksonville Waves and Charlotte Crown.

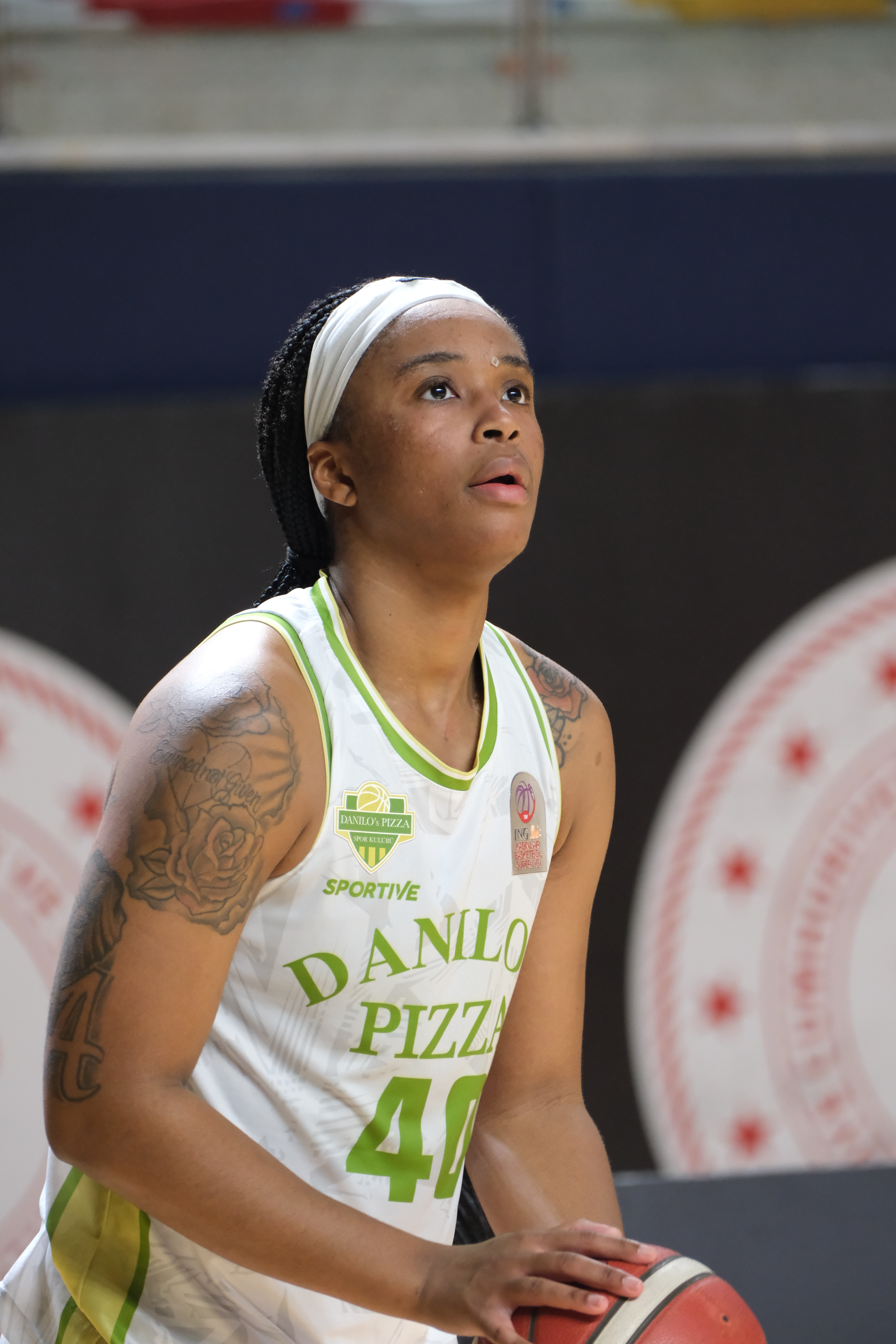
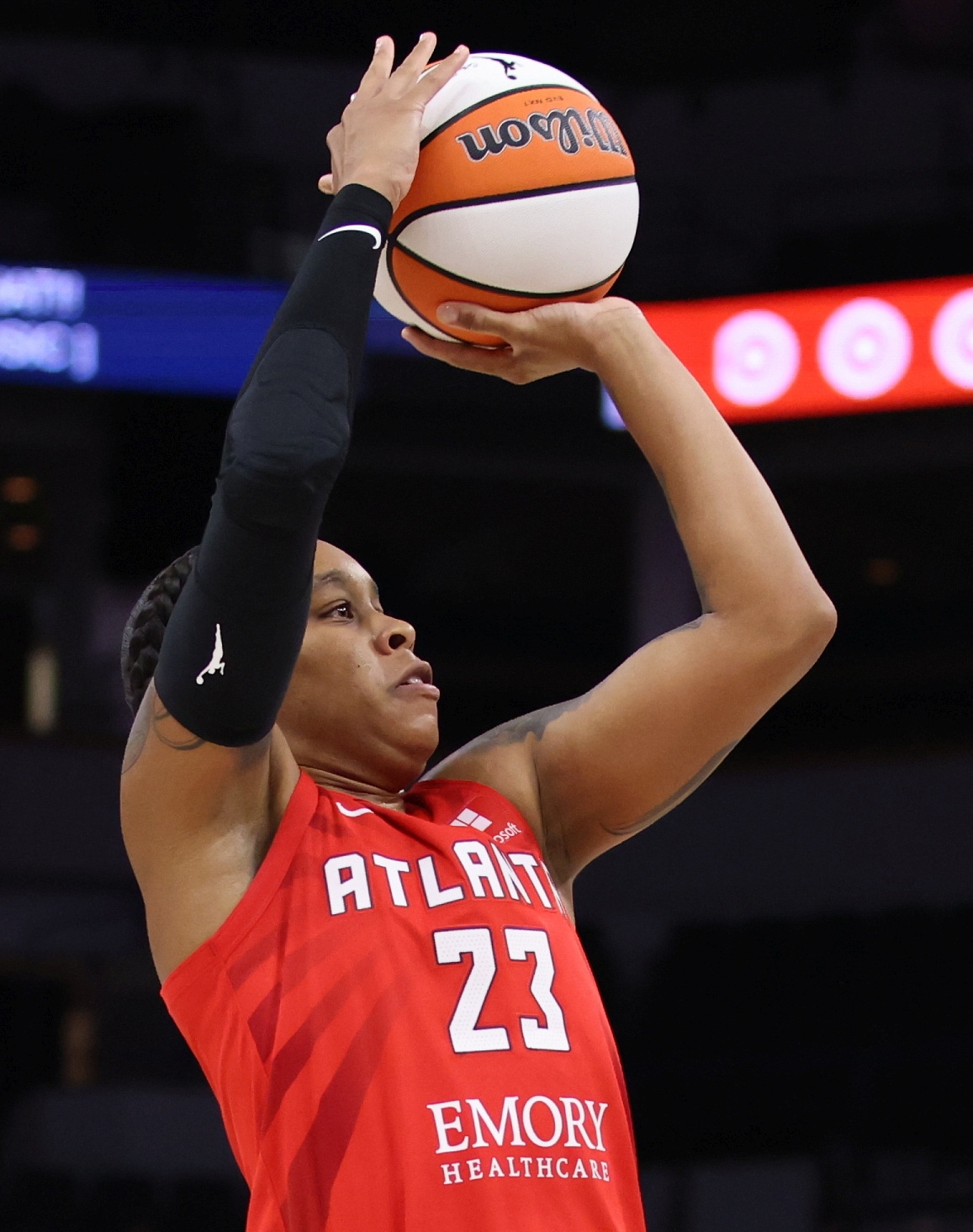
Jasmine Walker (left) and Asia "AD" Durr (right), two of the league's inaugural signees

Ahead of its inaugural season, the league announced its first player signings. The group featured former WNBA first-round picks Jasmine Walker and Asia "AD" Durr, as well as Lindsey Pulliam, Amiya Joyner, Que Morrison, and Schaquilla Nunn. The league also held regional tryouts.

In May 2026, the league announced sponsorship agreements with sporting goods manufacturer Molten and Shaquille O'Neal's Dunkman brand, which would produce league uniforms.

=== Player development ===
In July 2026, Michelle Onyiah became the first player in UpShot League history to sign with a WNBA team when she joined the Indiana Fever on a developmental roster contract. Onyiah had played for the Charlotte Crown during the league's inaugural season, averaging 9.6 points, 6.9 rebounds, and 1.1 blocks per game in 21 games before signing with Indiana.

=== Postseason ===
In July 2026, the league announced that its inaugural championship game would be held at VyStar Veterans Memorial Arena in Jacksonville, Florida, on August 29, 2026. The championship will feature the top two teams in the regular-season standings. During the announcement, commissioner Donna Orender also announced that the league's Most Valuable Player award would be named in honor of Ann Meyers Drysdale.

=== Expansion ===
In November 2025, the league's first expansion team, the Baltimore Starlings, was announced. A second expansion team, the Nashville Vibe, was announced in April 2026.

Kaufmann announced in May 2026 that the expansion plan was to reach further than the southeastern United States and to include up to 30 teams. He said, "2027, looking at six to eight teams. 2028, ten to twelve teams, and on and on we go on our way to thirty teams."

== Teams ==
UpShot League teams
Location of UpShot League teams:
Current Expansion

As of 2026, the league feature four teams, all based in the southeastern United States.

UpShot League teams
Team	Location	Venue	Cap	First
Charlotte Crown	Charlotte, NC	Bojangles Coliseum	8,600	2026
Greensboro Groove	Greensboro, NC	Novant Health Fieldhouse	2,118	2026
Jacksonville Waves	Jacksonville, FL	VyStar Veterans Memorial Arena	14,091	2026
Savannah Steel	Savannah, GA	Enmarket Arena	7,485	2026

Future UpShot League teams
Team	Location	Venue	Cap	First
Baltimore Starlings	Catonsville, MD	Chesapeake Employers Insurance Arena	5,500	2027
Nashville Vibe	Nashville, TN	Memorial Gymnasium	14,316	2027
UpShot Providence	Providence, RI	Amica Mutual Pavilion	12,410	2027
UpShot Tampa	Tampa, FL	Yuengling Center	10,500	2027

== Operations ==
The UpShot League is headquartered in Jacksonville, Florida, and is operated by Zawyer Sports & Entertainment.

In May 2026, league officials stated that the organization had secured $40 million in investment commitments from approximately 90 investors and financial partners ahead of its debut season. Kaufmann stated that the league's revenue model would rely primarily on sponsorships and ticket sales rather than media-rights agreements and merchandise revenue.

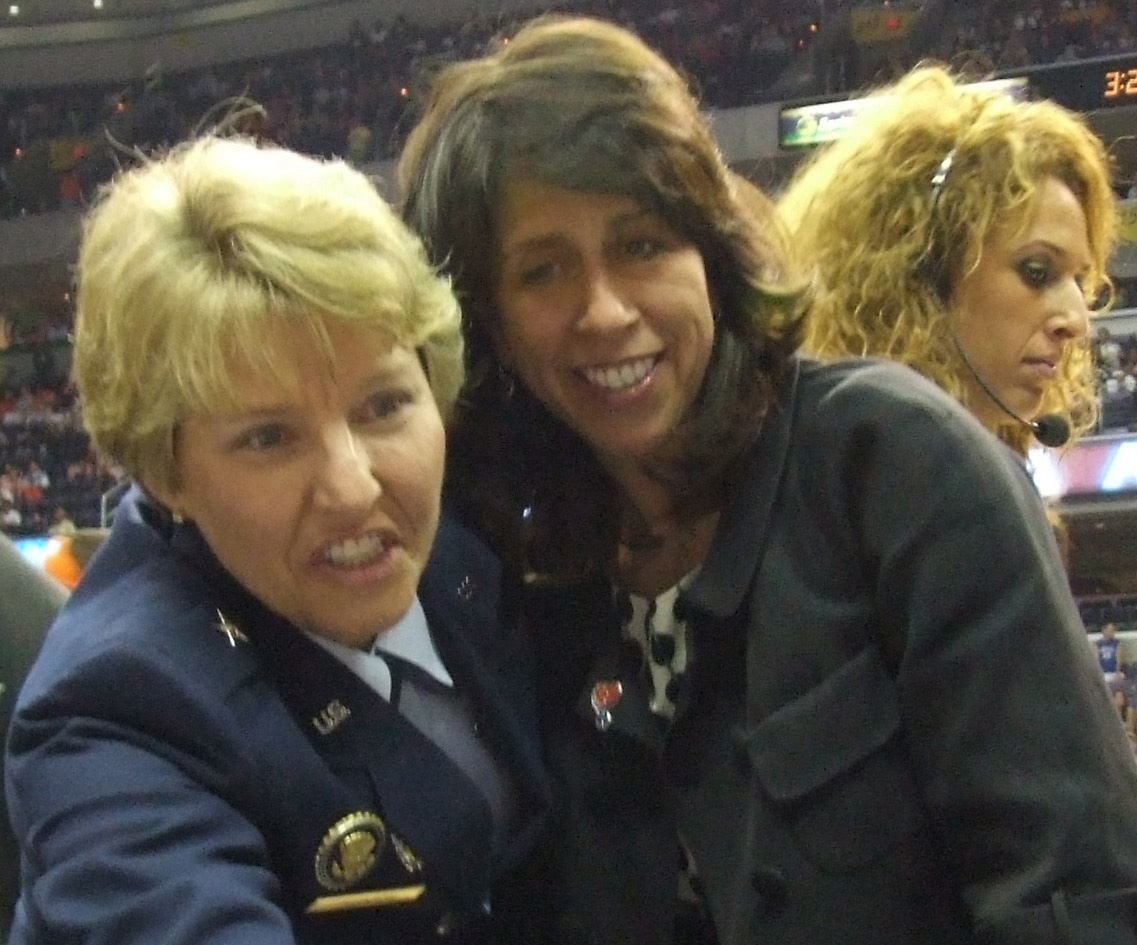
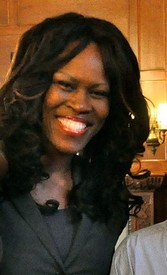
From left to right: Orender (center) and McWilliams-Franklin

=== Key personnel ===
- Andy Kaufmann, CEO of Zawyer Sports & Entertainment
- Mark Walsh, co-founder
- Donna Orender, co-founder and first Commissioner
- Taj McWilliams-Franklin, Deputy Commissioner
- Dee Brown, VP of Basketball Operations

=== Investors ===
- Cheryl Miller, Women's Basketball Hall of Famer
- Ann Meyers Drysdale, Women's Basketball Hall of Famer and former WNBA/NBA executive
- Seniesa Estrada, Former WBA boxing champion
- Patric Young, Former Florida Gators men's basketball player & PY4 Foundation
- Annie Q. Riegel, American actress, and her husband, Chris, American film producer
- Tamika Catchings, Women's Basketball Hall of Famer

=== Leadership changes ===
On September 14, 2026, the Upshot League announced that co-founder and inaugural commissioner Donna Orender stepped down from her position on August 31 following the conclusion of the league's first season. Following her departure, VP of Basketball Operations Taj McWilliams-Franklin was promoted to deputy commissioner to help lead the league through its transition period, while former NBA player and Jacksonville, Florida-native Dee Brown was named the new VP of basketball operations.

== Broadcast coverage ==
For its inaugural season, the league announced that 15 games will air nationally on the Scripps Sports Network, with the remainder of the games airing on the league's YouTube channel. The league also reached agreements with local over-the-air networks including WCCB in Charlotte (34 games), WMYV in Greensboro (7 games), WJXT/WCWJ in Jacksonville (9 games), and WJCL/WRDW-TV in Savannah.
