= Savannah Steel =

Women's basketball team based in Savannah, Georgia

- League: UpShot League
- Founded: January 28, 2025; 21 months ago Savannah, Georgia, U.S.
- History: 2026–
- Arena: Enmarket Arena
- Capacity: 9,500
- Location: Savannah, Georgia
- Team colors: Magenta, Black, White
- Head coach: Coretta Brown
- Ownership: Zawyer Sports & Entertainment
- Website: SteelUpShot.com

The Savannah Steel are a professional women's basketball team based in Savannah, Georgia. They are an inaugural franchise of the UpShot League, a women's basketball league in the United States. The team will begin play in May 2026 at Enmarket Arena.

== History ==
In September 2025, the Savannah Steel were announced as the newest franchise in the UpShot League, which launched earlier that year. The team is owned and operated by Zawyer Sports & Entertainment, a company that also owns other franchises in the league.

On December 8, 2025, the UpShot League announced the opening weekend matchups for each team. Savannah is scheduled to open its season on May 22 & 24, 2026, against the Greensboro Groove and Jacksonville Waves.

=== Coach ===
The Savannah Steel's inaugural head coach is Coretta Brown, a Southeast Georgia native and Southeast Bulloch High School alum. Brown's basketball résumé includes being Georgia’s 1999 Gatorade Player of the Year, a standout at the University of North Carolina, and a first-round pick in the 2003 WNBA draft by the San Antonio Silver Stars. Her playing career included stops with the Indiana Fever, Chicago Sky, and overseas before transitioning into coaching.

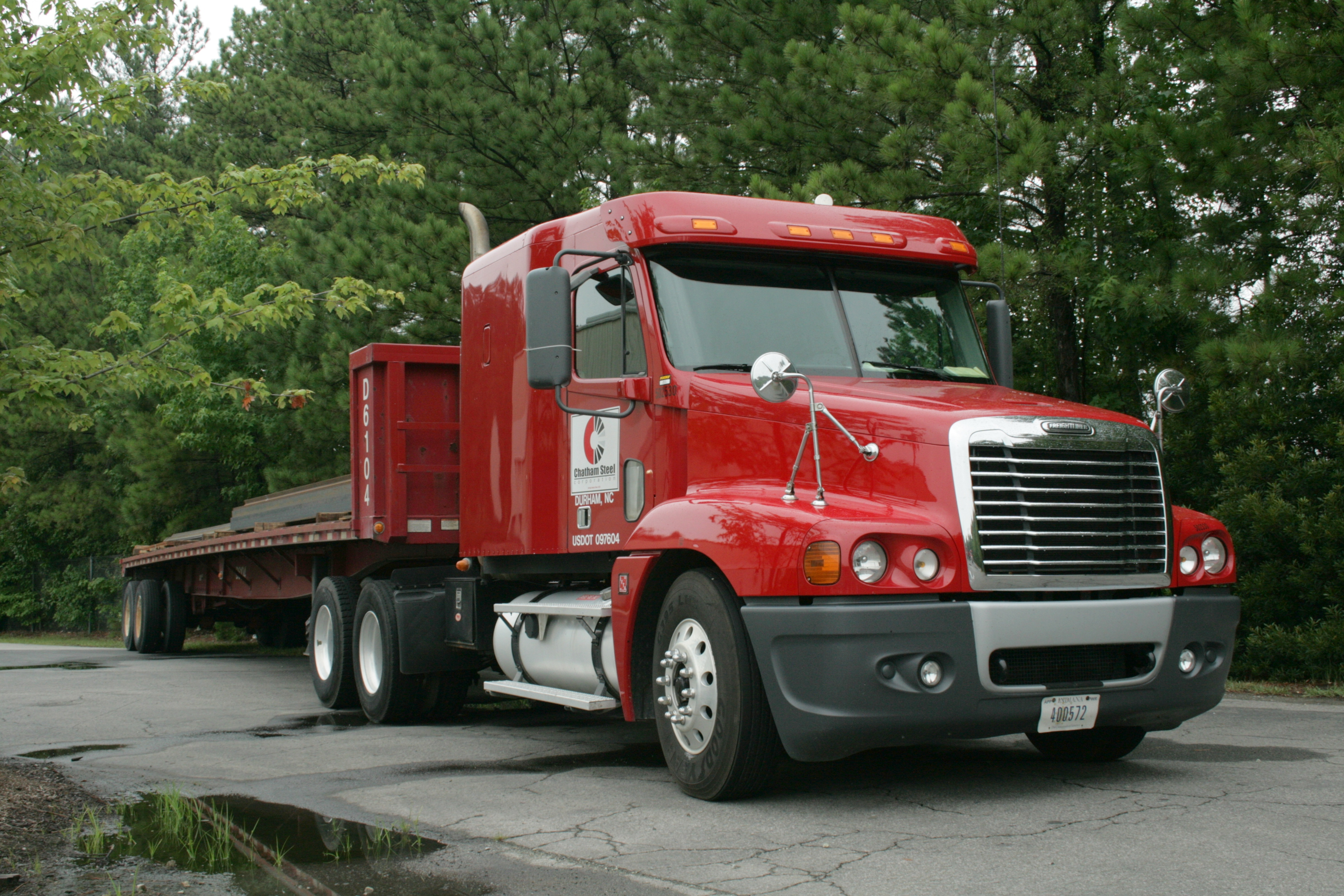
A Chatham Steel freightliner. Chatham Steel, founded in 1915, is headquartered in Savannah, Georgia.

=== Name ===
The team's branding reflects Savannah's industrial heritage, drawing inspiration from the city's ship and railyards, as well as the steel industry. The Steel's identity emphasizes grit, determination, and a commitment to breaking barriers.

== Arena ==
The Savannah Steel will host their home games at Enmarket Arena, a venue located in downtown Savannah. The arena has a capacity of 9,500 spectators.

== Personnel ==
=== Current roster ===
Savannah Steel roster
Players
Coaches

Pos.	No.	Name	Age – Date of birth	Height	Club	Ctr.
F	12	Alisia Jenkins	32 – 21 February 1994	6 ft 1 in (1.85 m)	South Florida	(United States)
G	10	Cori Lard	24 – 31 December 2001	5 ft 9 in (1.75 m)	Winthrop	(United States)
G	14	Harmoni Turner	24 – 4 October 2001	5 ft 10 in (1.78 m)	Harvard	(United States)
G	2	Ja'Leah Williams	24 – 11 February 2002	5 ft 9 in (1.75 m)	Louisville	(United States)
G	3	JJ Quinerly	23 – 24 October 2002	5 ft 8 in (1.73 m)	West Virginia	(United States)
G	14	Kyah Watson	24 – December 5, 2001	5 ft 10 in (1.78 m)	West Virginia	(United States)
G	15	Lasha Petree	26 – 9 April 2000	6 ft 0 in (1.83 m)	Purdue	(United States)
F	32	Zee Spearman	22 – 25 January 2004	6 ft 4 in (1.93 m)	Tennessee	(United States)
G	34	Lauryn Taylor	23 – 23 August 2002	5 ft 11 in (1.8 m)	FGCU	(United States)
F	33	NaJai Pollard	29 – 26 April 1997	5 ft 11 in (1.8 m)	Delaware State	(United States)
G	5	Ta'Mia Scott	22 – 16 April 2004	6 ft 0 in (1.83 m)	Alabama	(United States)

Head coach

Coretta Brown

Legend

- On injured reserve (IR)
