= Mark E. Walsh =

U.S. Deputy Chief of Protocol

Mark E. Walsh was the Deputy Chief of Protocol of the United States from April 2011 to January 2017 and served as Acting Chief of Protocol in the final months of President Obama's second term.

He graduated from Boston University with a Bachelor of Arts in Political Science and Economics. He received his law degree from Boston University School of Law.
