= Savannah Ghost Pirates =

Minor league ice hockey team

- City: Savannah, Georgia
- League: ECHL
- Conference: Eastern
- Division: South
- Founded: 2022
- Home arena: Enmarket Arena
- Colors: Black, white, green
- Mascot: Davy
- Owner: Zawyer Sports & Entertainment (Andy Kaufmann)
- Head coach: Jared Staal
- Affiliates: Florida Panthers (NHL); Charlotte Checkers (AHL)
- Website: ghostpirateshockey.com

Franchise history
- 2022–present: Savannah Ghost Pirates

The Savannah Ghost Pirates are a professional minor league ice hockey team in the ECHL based in Savannah, Georgia. The team began play in the 2022–23 ECHL season with home games played at Enmarket Arena.

== History ==
In January 2021, the city of Savannah, Georgia, was reported to have come to an agreement with the ECHL's Jacksonville Icemen majority owner Andy Kaufmann to place an expansion team in the new Savannah Arena for the 2022–23 season. The team was the first tenant announced for Enmarket Arena, which was planned to be completed in January 2022. The ECHL approved the membership of the expansion team on January 27, 2021, to begin play in the 2022–23 season. On October 27, 2021, the team name was announced as the Savannah Ghost Pirates.

On May 19, 2022, the Ghost Pirates announced a one-year affiliation for the 2022–23 season with the Vegas Golden Knights of the National Hockey League (NHL), as well as their American Hockey League (AHL) affiliate, the Henderson Silver Knights. Additionally, former NHL player and Union Dutchmen head coach Rick Bennett was announced as Savannah's first head coach. The team was placed in the South Division with the Atlanta Gladiators, Florida Everblades, Greenville Swamp Rabbits, Jacksonville Icemen, Orlando Solar Bears, and the South Carolina Stingrays.

On June 17, 2024, Ghost Pirates announced an affiliation agreement with the Florida Panthers of the National Hockey League (NHL), as well as their American Hockey League (AHL) affiliate, the Charlotte Checkers.

=== Ice Cove ===
The Ice Cove is a new ice facility being built in Port Wentworth, Georgia, and will serve as the primary practice home of the Savannah Ghost Pirates. The project is part of the larger Anchor Park development and is designed to support both the team and the local community, with space for public skating, youth hockey, and other ice programs.

Plans for the Ice Cove were announced in April 2023, when the Ghost Pirates and the City of Port Wentworth reached an agreement to build a dedicated practice and community ice facility. The project calls for a roughly 90,000 sq ft (8,360 sq m) building with two regulation ice rinks, giving the region its first large-scale, purpose-built ice complex. Alongside serving the team’s training needs, the facility is intended to expand access to ice sports in coastal Georgia.

Construction officially began with a groundbreaking ceremony on August 20, 2024. Work continued through 2025, with the building taking shape and a major milestone reached in October 2025, when the final structural beam was placed. As of late 2025, construction was still underway, with the Ice Cove expected to be completed and open sometime in 2026.

== Culture ==
Ghost Pirates season-ticket holders are known as "Fantoms". The team's name and their mascot's name were chosen through a fan vote.

== Season-by-season record ==
Note: GP = Games played, W = Wins, L = Losses, OTL = Overtime losses, SOL = shootout losses, Pts = Points, GF = Goals for, GA = Goals against, PIM = Penalties in minutes

Regular season											Playoffs				
Season	GP	W	L	OTL	SOL	Pts	GF	GA	PIM	Standing	Year	1st round	2nd round	3rd round	Kelly Cup
2022–23	72	28	34	9	1	66	207	258	928	7th, South	2023	Did not qualify			
2023–24	72	30	34	7	1	68	218	243	928	6th, South	2024	Did not qualify			
2024–25	72	31	34	6	1	69	226	248	862	5th, South	2025	Did not qualify			
2025–26	72	35	33	3	1	74	209	208	766	4th, South	2026	L, 0–4, FLA	–	–	–
