= Enmarket Arena =

Multipurpose arena in Savannah, Georgia

- Location within Georgia Location within the United States
- Address: 620 Stiles Avenue
- Location: Savannah, Georgia, U.S.
- Coordinates: 32.0741°N 81.1116°W
- Owner: The City of Savannah
- Operator: Oak View Group
- Capacity: 9,500 (concerts) (Hockey) 6,876 (2022-2023); 6,795 (2023-2024); 7,485 (2024-)

Construction
- Opened: February 2022

Tenants
- Savannah Ghost Pirates (ECHL) (2022–present); Savannah Steel (UpShot League) (2026–present); Savannah Leprechauns (IFL) (2027–present)

Website
- enmarketarena.com

Enmarket Arena is a multi-purpose complex in Savannah, Georgia, United States. It opened in February 2022 with a 9,500-seat arena, including twelve luxury suites, five lodge boxes, and a party suite. Enmarket Arena is the home to the Savannah Ghost Pirates of the ECHL.

== History ==
The possibility of a new arena in Savannah was discussed for around 20 years before the announcement of the Enmarket Arena. Discussions began about replacing the Savannah Civic Center started in 2001.

In fall 2018, the City of Savannah announced plans for the construction of a new arena in the westside to replace the Martin Luther King, Jr. Arena at the Savannah Civic Center. In September 2019, the proposed new arena broke ground. In January 2021, the ECHL approved a 2022–23 season expansion team to play out of the new arena. In July 2021, the convenience store chain Enmarket secured the naming rights to the arena to be named Enmarket Arena.

The arena's parking lots were not expected to be completed in time for the arena's opening, and as such a temporary parking plan was established.

In January 2022, a delay was announced due to the ongoing supply chain crisis, construction issues, and the coronavirus pandemic. Shows were postponed until early February.

The Ghost Pirates' first game at Enmarket Arena took place on November 5, 2022, with a 5–1 victory over the Greenville Swamp Rabbits.

== Events ==
=== Professional wrestling ===
Professional wrestling promotion All Elite Wrestling held an event at the arena on July 13, 2022, which included tapings for that week's episodes of their television programs AEW Dynamite and AEW Rampage. WWE would hold an episode of Monday Night Raw on June 26th, 2023. They were originally going to hold their 2024 NXT Battleground event from the arena on May 26, before it was rescheduled to June 9, and was moved to the UFC Apex in Enterprise, Nevada. WWE would later hold an episode of Monday Night Raw in the arena on May 27, 2024.

=== Other events ===
Monster Jam has been holding events at the arena since 2023. Jeff Dunham would perform there on November 22, 2024. Nitro Circus would also hold a show there in December of 2024.

=== Concerts ===
The first concert held at Enmarket Arena was Athens' Corey Smith with Riley Green on February 6, 2022. Other concerts have included Earth, Wind & Fire, Eagles, New Edition, Bon Jovi, Jimmy Buffett (April 21, 2022), Seether with Breaking Benjamin and Lacey Sturm (of Flyleaf), The Lumineers, Pitbull with Iggy Azalea, Keith Urban, Athens' Widespread Panic (in 2022 and 2023), Jelly Roll, Reba McEntire, Adam Sandler, puppet comedian Jeff Dunham, Barry Manilow, Journey, Jacksonville's Shinedown with Three Days Grace, Janet Jackson (with Ludacris), SC's Needtobreathe with Judah & the Lion, Stevie Nicks, Dave Matthews Band, Disturbed, Jacksonville's Lynyrd Skynyrd, and Phish (July 14-15, 2026). Georgia music acts that have performed at Enmarket Arena include rappers Big Boi (from Savannah) with Goodie Mob (CeeLo Green), Ying Yang Twins, and Lil Scrappy. Other Georgia acts that performed there are Luke Bryan (from south Georgia), Corey Smith, Widespread Panic, Ludacris, and Monica (90s Kick Back tour). Georgia country singers Sam Hunt, and Jason Aldean (from Macon) (with Lauren Alaina) performing there in 2024.

=== SEC women's volleyball tournament ===
The Southeastern Conference announced on September 18, 2024 that it would reinstate its women's volleyball postseason tournament in 2025 after a 20-year absence. Enmarket Arena will host the first three editions of the revived tournament (2025–27).
