= Jacksonville Waves =

Women's basketball team based in Jacksonville, Florida

- League: UpShot League
- Founded: January 27, 2025; 21 months ago Jacksonville, Florida, U.S.
- History: 2026–
- Arena: VyStar Veterans Memorial Arena
- Capacity: 14,091
- Location: Jacksonville, Florida
- Team colors: Deep teal, Coastal blue, White
- Head coach: Jessica Bogia
- Ownership: Zawyer Sports & Entertainment
- Website: WavesUpShot.com

The Jacksonville Waves are a professional women’s basketball team based in Jacksonville, Florida. The Waves are an inaugural franchise of the UpShot League, a women’s basketball league in the United States, set to begin play in May 2026.

== History ==
In January 2025, Zawyer Sports & Entertainment announced the formation of a new women’s professional basketball league — the UpShot League — headquartered in Jacksonville. At that time, the league confirmed it would launch with a minimum of four teams, one of which would be based in Jacksonville.

On October 1, 2025, the UpShot League formally revealed the Jacksonville franchise name and identity: the Jacksonville Waves, along with the appointment of Jessica Bogia as head coach.

On December 8, 2025, the Upshot League announced its opening weekend matchups, setting up a May 15, 2026 season opener between Jacksonville and the Charlotte Crown. The two teams met again in the league's inaugural championship game on August 29, 2026, where the Crown defeated the Waves 81-76. Played before a prominent crowd featuring NBA Hall of Famer Shaquille O'Neal, the final concluded the league's successful first season. The Crown erased a 14-point deficit behind 29 points from league scoring leader Deja Kelly to overcome top-seeded Jacksonville, which finished the year with a 25-10 record.

=== Coach ===
A longtime presence in college basketball, Bogia spent more than two decades as an assistant and recruiting coordinator at programs including the Hofstra Pride, Jacksonville Dolphins, and Memphis Tigers, where she became known for her player-development work and strong recruiting classes. Now joining the Waves, she steps into her first professional head-coaching role.

=== Team identity ===
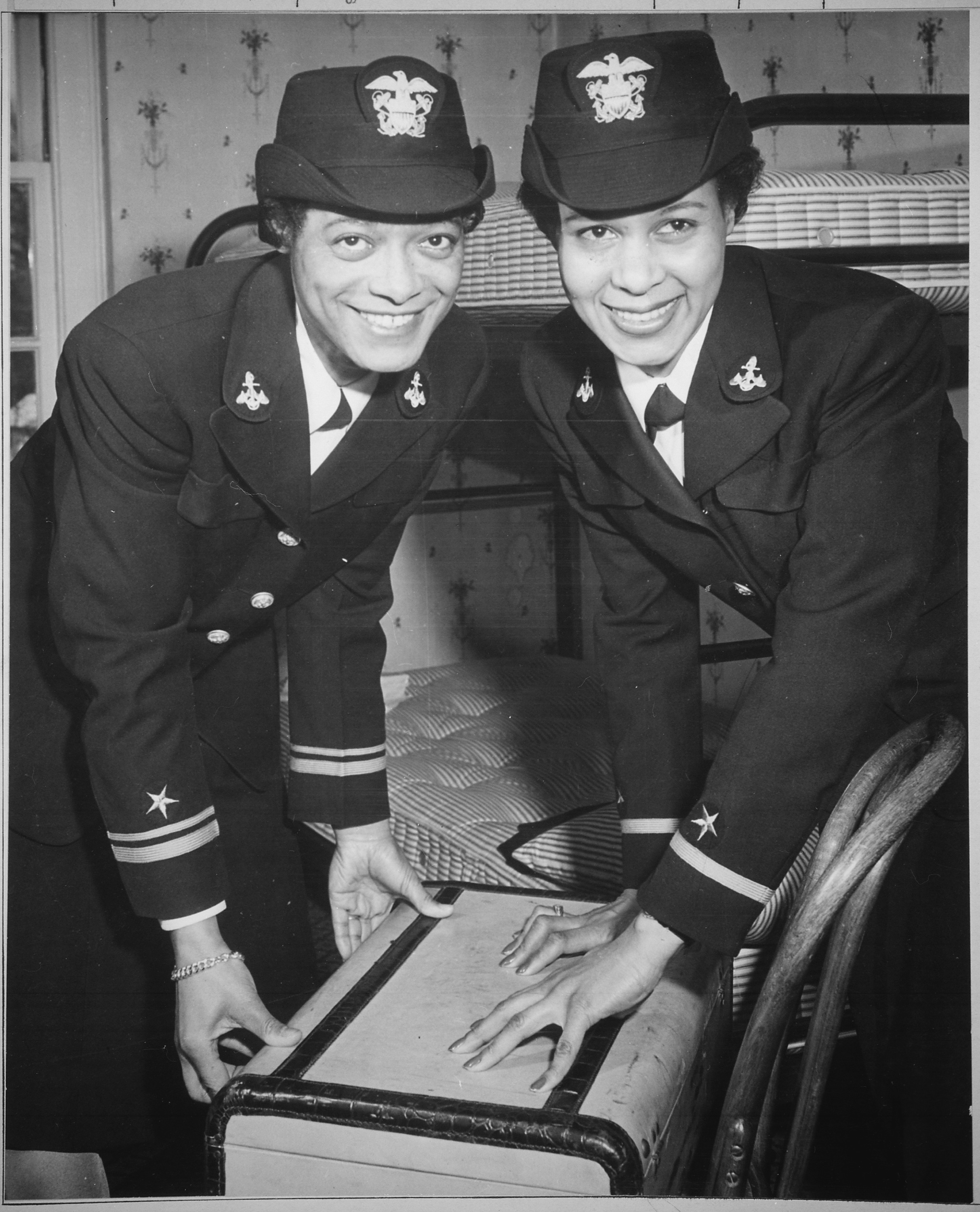
Lt. Harriet Ida Pickens and Ens. Frances Wills, the first African-American officers in the WAVES, the WWII Navy program that inspired the team’s name.

During the launch announcement, league officials stated that the team’s branding draws from Jacksonville’s geography—where the St. Johns River meets the Atlantic Ocean—and honors the legacy of the WAVES, Women Accepted for Volunteer Emergency Service, the women's branch of the United States Navy Reserve during World War II, many of whom served at Naval Air Station Jacksonville.

== Arena ==
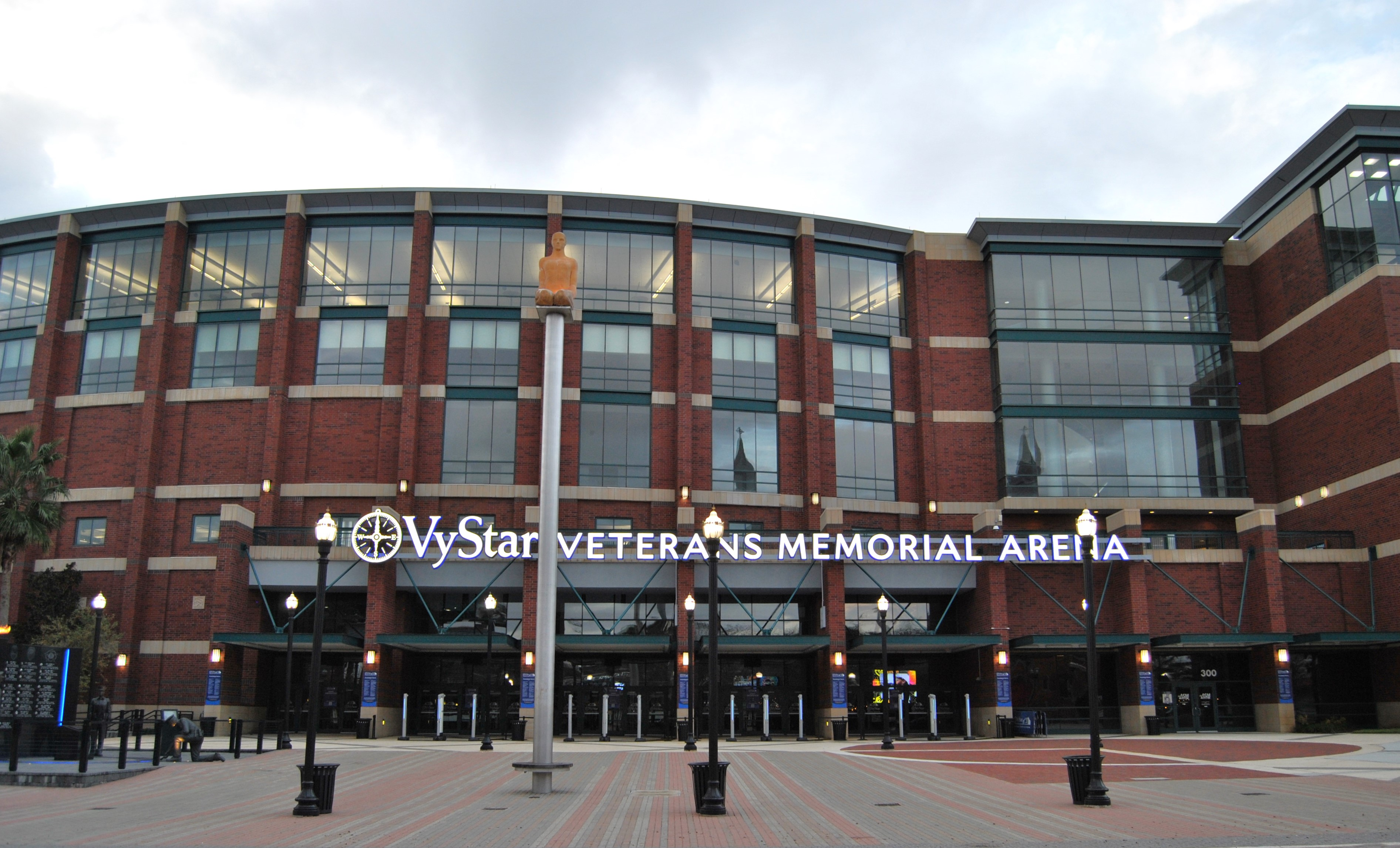
The entrance to VyStar Veterans Memorial Arena.

The Waves will play their home games at VyStar Veterans Memorial Arena. The UpShot League will play a season of 20 home games and 20 away games. The arena has a capacity of up to 15,000. Andy Kaufmann, the owner of Zawyer Sports & Entertainment, stated in the team's introductory press conference that he wanted to average a higher attendance than some WNBA teams.

== Personnel ==
=== Current roster ===
Jacksonville Waves roster
Players
Coaches

Pos.	No.	Name	Age – Date of birth	Height	Club	Ctr.
G	12	Ariel Hearn	32 – 1 April 1994	5 ft 9 in (1.75 m)	Memphis	(United States)
F	40	Jasmine Walker	28 – 3 February 1998	6 ft 3 in (1.91 m)	Alabama	(United States)
G	10	Lindsey Pulliam	26 – 6 August 1999	5 ft 11 in (1.8 m)	Northwestern	(United States)
F	22	Brianna Turnage	23 – 19 October 2002	6 ft 2 in (1.88 m)	Georgia Tech	(United States)
G	5	Emma Von Essen	22 – 5 April 2004	5 ft 9 in (1.75 m)	Hofstra	(United States)
G	3	Khayla Pointer	27 – 25 November 1998	5 ft 7 in (1.7 m)	LSU	(United States)
G	21	Madison Griggs	25 – 29 January 2001	5 ft 9 in (1.75 m)	Memphis	(United States)
G	6	Shyanne Sellers	23 – 24 April 2003	6 ft 2 in (1.88 m)	Maryland	(United States)
F	35	Taylor Soule	26 – 5 January 2000	5 ft 11 in (1.8 m)	Virginia Tech	(United States)
F	0	Rennia Davis	27 – 24 February 1999	6 ft 1 in (1.85 m)	Tennessee	(United States)
C	2	Adut Bulgak	33 – 20 December 1992	6 ft 4 in (1.93 m)	Florida State	(South Sudan)
G	–	Janasia Law	27 – 29 July 1999	5 ft 5 in (1.65 m)	Delaware State	(United States)

Head coach

Jessica Bogia

Assistant coach(es)
