= Greensboro Groove =

Women's basketball team based in Greensboro, North Carolina

- League: UpShot League
- Founded: January 29, 2025; 21 months ago Greensboro, North Carolina, U.S.
- History: 2026–
- Arena: Novant Health Fieldhouse
- Capacity: 2,118
- Location: Greensboro, North Carolina
- Team colors: Cool green, new blue, white
- Head coach: Janice M. Washington
- Ownership: Zawyer Sports & Entertainment
- Website: GrooveUpShot.com

The Greensboro Groove are a professional women's basketball franchise set to compete in the inaugural season of the UpShot League, a women’s basketball league in the United States. The team is based in Greensboro, North Carolina.

== History ==
The franchise was unveiled in October 2025 as part of the first wave of teams in the UpShot League.

On December 8, 2025, the UpShot League announced the opening weekend matchups for each team. Greensboro is scheduled to open its season on May 15–16, 2026, against the Savannah Steel.

=== Coach ===
Janice M. Washington was appointed as the head coach in October 2025. Washington brings nearly two decades of collegiate coaching experience, including leading Lincoln University (Pennsylvania) to back‑to‑back CIAA North Division titles, and previous coaching roles at Daytona State College and Campbell University.

=== Name ===
The team name, "Groove," and its branding were designed to reflect cultural elements associated with Greensboro. The logo uses colors referred to by the team as "cool green" and "new blue.

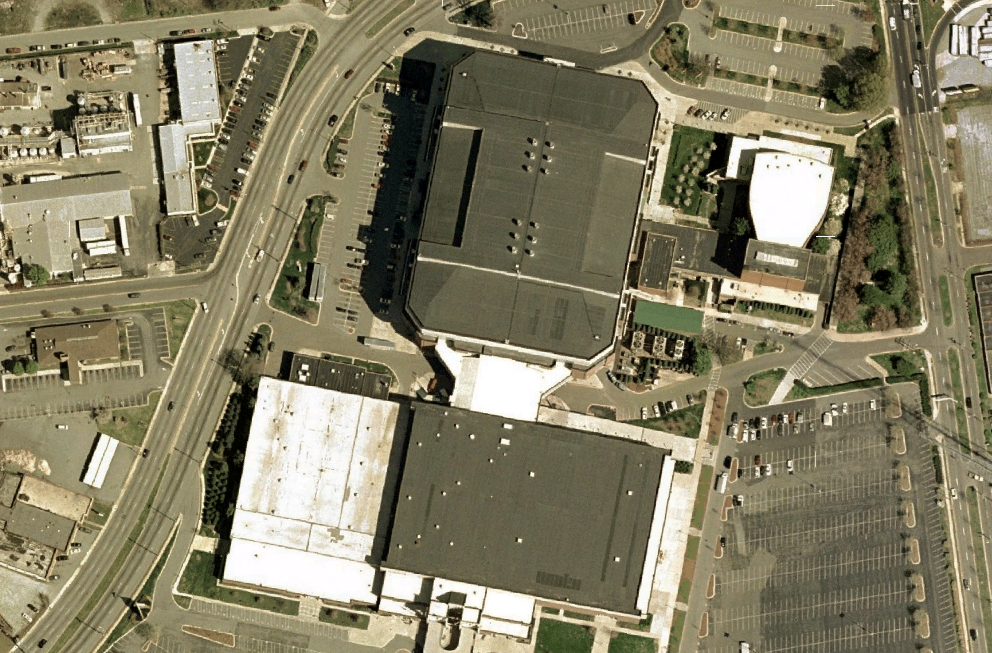
Greensboro Coliseum, North Carolina. Satellite view.

== Arena ==
Home games are to be held at Novant Health Fieldhouse in Greensboro, which is also home to the Greensboro Swarm, the NBA G League affiliate of the Charlotte Hornets. The venue has a capacity of 2,118. The league will play a season of 40 games, 20 home and 20 away.

== Ownership ==
The UpShot League is operated by Zawyer Sports & Entertainment, headquartered in Jacksonville, Florida.

== Personnel ==
=== Current roster ===
Greensboro Groove roster
Players
Coaches

Pos.	No.	Name	Age – Date of birth	Height	Club	Ctr.
F	5	Amaya Scott	26 – 9 September 1999	6 ft 1 in (1.85 m)	George Mason	(United States)
F	0	Christabel Ezumah	24 – 8 March 2002	6 ft 2 in (1.88 m)	Alabama	(United States)
G	3	Diamond Johnson	24 – 15 April 2002	5 ft 4 in (1.63 m)	Norfolk State	(United States)
G	13	Christyn Williams	26 – 20 May 2000	5 ft 11 in (1.8 m)	UConn	(United States)
G	23	Jessica Timmons	23 – 1 February 2003	5 ft 8 in (1.73 m)	Alabama	(United States)
G	–	Jordan McLaughlin	24 – October 14, 2001	5 ft 9 in (1.75 m)	Old Dominion	(United States)
G/F	12	Kayla Jones	27 – May 20, 1999	6 ft 1 in (1.85 m)	NC State	(United States)
G	41	Kiara Leslie	30 – December 6, 1995	6 ft 0 in (1.83 m)	NC State	(United States)
G	9	Ny'Ceara Pryor	22 – July 23, 2004	5 ft 3 in (1.6 m)	Texas A&M	(United States)
F	15	Sacha Washington	23 – November 14, 2002	6 ft 2 in (1.88 m)	Vanderbilt	(United States)
G/F	24	Sahara Jones	23 – 23 August 2002	6 ft 0 in (1.83 m)	Texas A&M	(United States)
G	20	Sydney Shaw	22 – July 2, 2004	5 ft 9 in (1.75 m)	West Virginia	(United States)
G/F	1	Tayanna Jones Bell	26 – 31 May 2000	6 ft 1 in (1.85 m)	Colorado	(United States)

Head coach

Janice M. Washington
