= List of 2022 WNBA season transactions =

This is a list of transactions that have taken place during the off-season and the 2022 WNBA season.

== Front office movements ==
=== Head coach changes ===
Off-season

Departure date	Team	Outgoing head coach	Reason for departure	Hire date	Incoming head coach	Last coaching position	Ref.
October 12, 2021	Atlanta Dream	(United States) Darius Taylor	Interim coach, contract not renewed	October 12	(United States) Tanisha Wright	Las Vegas Aces assistant coach (2020–2021)	
December 6, 2021	New York Liberty	(United States) Walt Hopkins	Mutual agreement	January 7	(Australia) Sandy Brondello	Phoenix Mercury head coach (2014–2021)	
December 6, 2021	Phoenix Mercury	(Australia) Sandy Brondello	Mutual agreement	January 24	(United States) Vanessa Nygaard	Las Vegas Aces assistant coach (2021)	
December 31, 2021	Las Vegas Aces	(United States) Bill Laimbeer	Mutual agreement	December 31	(United States) Becky Hammon	San Antonio Spurs assistant coach (2014–2022)	

== Player movement ==
=== Trades ===
January
January 31	To Atlanta Dream: (Czech Republic) Kia Vaughn	To Phoenix Mercury: 2023 third-round pick (Pick 27) (Destiny Harden)
February
February 3
February 3	To Los Angeles Sparks: (United States) Katie Lou Samuelson	To Seattle Storm: (France) Gabby Williams
February 3	Three-team trade	
February 3	To Chicago Sky: (Belgium) Julie Allemand (from Indiana); 2023 first-round pick (from Phoenix, Pick 5)	To Phoenix Mercury: (United States) Diamond DeShields (from Chicago)
February 3	To Indiana Fever: (France) Bria Hartley (from Phoenix); 2022 first-round pick (from Chicago, Pick 7); 2022 second-round pick (Pick 20) (from Phoenix) (Destanni Henderson); 2023 first-round pick (from Chicago, Pick 11); 2023 second-round pick (Pick 17) (from Phoenix) (LaDazhia Williams)	
February 5	To Atlanta Dream: (United States) Erica Wheeler; 2022 second-round pick (Pick 15) (Naz Hillmon); 2023 first-round pick (Pick 4)	To Los Angeles Sparks: (United States) Chennedy Carter; (China) Li Yueru
March
March 8	To Dallas Wings: (United States) Teaira McCowan; 2022 first-round pick (Pick 7) (Veronica Burton); 2023 first-round pick (Pick 11) (Abby Meyers)	To Indiana Fever: 2022 first-round pick (Pick 4) (Emily Engstler); 2022 first-round pick (Pick 6) (Lexie Hull); 2023 first-round pick (Pick 7) (Grace Berger)
March 30	To Chicago Sky: (China) Li Yueru	To Los Angeles Sparks: (United States) Lexie Brown
April
April 6	To Atlanta Dream: 2022 first-round pick (Pick 1) (Rhyne Howard)	To Washington Mystics: 2022 first-round pick (Pick 3) (Shakira Austin); 2022 second-round pick (Pick 14) (Christyn Williams); 2023 first-round pick (right to swap, Pick 4) (Stephanie Soares)
April 10	To Las Vegas Aces: 2022 first-round pick (Pick 8) (Mya Hollingshed); 2022 second-round pick (Pick 13) (Khayla Pointer)	To Minnesota Lynx: 2023 first-round pick (Pick 12) (Maïa Hirsch); 2023 second-round pick (Pick 24) (Brea Beal)
April 11	To New York Liberty: (Italy) Lorela Cubaj	To Seattle Storm: 2023 second-round pick (Pick 18) (Madi Williams)

=== Free agency ===
Player	Date signed	New team	Former team	Ref
(United States) Natisha Hiedeman	January 3	Connecticut Sun		
(United States) Beatrice Mompremier	January 4	Connecticut Sun		
(United States) Lauren Cox	January 4	Los Angeles Sparks		
(Canada) Bridget Carleton	January 4	Minnesota Lynx		
(United States) Jaylyn Agnew	January 6	Atlanta Dream		
(United States) Chelsey Perry	January 6	Indiana Fever		
(United States) Megan Gustafson	January 6	Washington Mystics		
(United States) Shey Peddy	January 13	Phoenix Mercury		
(United States) Paris Kea	January 14	New York Liberty		
(United States) Megan Walker	January 18	Atlanta Dream		
(United States) Te'a Cooper	January 20	Los Angeles Sparks		
(United States) Stephanie Jones	January 28	Connecticut Sun		
(United States) Tiffany Hayes	February 1	Atlanta Dream		
(United States) Nia Coffey	February 1	Atlanta Dream	Los Angeles Sparks	
(Bosnia and Herzegovina) Jonquel Jones	February 1	Connecticut Sun		
(United States) Sylvia Fowles	February 1	Minnesota Lynx		
(United States) Sophie Cunningham	February 1	Phoenix Mercury		
(United States) Jewell Loyd	February 1	Seattle Storm		
(United States) Mercedes Russell	February 1	Seattle Storm		
(United States) Tianna Hawkins	February 1	Washington Mystics	Atlanta Dream	
(United States) Myisha Hines-Allen	February 1	Washington Mystics		
(South Korea) Kang Lee-seul	February 1	Washington Mystics	Bucheon Hana 1Q (South Korea)	
(Sweden) Klara Lundquist	February 1	Washington Mystics	Södertälje BBK (Sweden)	
(United States) Shatori Walker-Kimbrough	February 1	Washington Mystics		
(United States) Elizabeth Williams	February 1	Washington Mystics	Atlanta Dream	
(United States) Taja Cole	February 2	Connecticut Sun	Baloncesto Málaga (Spain)	
(United States) Joyner Holmes	February 2	Connecticut Sun	Las Vegas Aces	
(United States) Courtney Williams	February 2	Connecticut Sun	Atlanta Dream	
(United States) A'ja Wilson	February 2	Las Vegas Aces		
(United States) Angel McCoughtry	February 2	Minnesota Lynx	Las Vegas Aces	
(United States) Briann January	February 2	Seattle Storm	Connecticut Sun	
(United States) Breanna Stewart	February 2	Seattle Storm		
(United States) Monique Billings	February 3	Atlanta Dream		
(United States) Arike Ogunbowale	February 3	Dallas Wings		
(United States) Kiah Stokes	February 3	Las Vegas Aces		
(United States) Riquna Williams	February 3	Las Vegas Aces		
(United States) Stefanie Dolson	February 3	New York Liberty	Chicago Sky	
(United States) Jennie Simms	February 3	Phoenix Mercury	Hapoel Rishon LeZion (Israel)	
(United States) Lindsay Allen	February 4	Indiana Fever		
(United States) Emma Cannon	February 4	Indiana Fever		
(Australia) Rebecca Allen	February 4	New York Liberty		
(United States) Tina Charles	February 4	Phoenix Mercury	Washington Mystics	
(Australia) Stephanie Talbot	February 4	Seattle Storm		
(United States) Crystal Bradford	February 5	Chicago Sky	Atlanta Dream	
(Canada) Kia Nurse	February 5	Phoenix Mercury		
(United States) Alaina Coates	February 7	Indiana Fever	Nesibe Aydın GSK (Turkey)	
(United States) Victoria Vivians	February 7	Indiana Fever		
(United States) Jordin Canada	February 8	Los Angeles Sparks	Seattle Storm	
(United States) Rachel Banham	February 8	Minnesota Lynx		
(United States) Layshia Clarendon	February 8	Minnesota Lynx		
(United States) Kysre Gondrezick	February 9	Chicago Sky	Indiana Fever	
(United States) Rebekah Gardner	February 10	Chicago Sky	Uni Girona CB (Spain)	
(United States) Kamiah Smalls	February 10	Chicago Sky	Connecticut Sun	
(United States) Jazmine Jones	February 10	Indiana Fever	New York Liberty	
(United States) Leaonna Odom	February 13	Phoenix Mercury	New York Liberty	
(Japan) Rui Machida	February 14	Washington Mystics	Fujitsu Red Wave (Japan)	
(United States) Khaalia Hillsman	February 15	Atlanta Dream	Dynamo Moscow (Russia)	
(United States) N'dea Jones	February 15	Atlanta Dream	Ramat Hasharon (Israel)	
(United States) Kalani Brown	February 15	Las Vegas Aces	Atlanta Dream	
(United States) Kahleah Copper	February 17	Chicago Sky		
(United States) Allie Quigley	February 17	Chicago Sky		
(United States) Courtney Vandersloot	February 17	Chicago Sky		
(United States) Jamasha Jackson	February 17	Washington Mystics	Santurce (Puerto Rico)	
(Belgium) Emma Meesseman	February 18	Chicago Sky	Washington Mystics	
(Australia) Liz Cambage	February 18	Los Angeles Sparks	Las Vegas Aces	
(United States) Natasha Mack	February 18	Minnesota Lynx	Chicago Sky	
(United States) Yvonne Turner	February 18	Minnesota Lynx	Çukurova Basketbol (Turkey)	
(United States) Sue Bird	February 18	Seattle Storm		
(United States) Micaela Kelly	February 19	Indiana Fever	Connecticut Sun	
(Australia) Kristy Wallace	February 20	Atlanta Dream	Southside Flyers (Australia)	
(Australia) Alanna Smith	February 20	Indiana Fever	Phoenix Mercury	
(Serbia) Yvonne Anderson	February 22	Connecticut Sun	Reyer Venezia (Italy)	
(United States) Linnae Harper	February 22	Washington Mystics	Minnesota Lynx	
(United States) Maya Caldwell	February 23	Atlanta Dream	Indiana Fever	
(United States) Lauren Manis	February 24	Seattle Storm	Las Vegas Aces	
(United States) Stephanie Mavunga	February 24	Washington Mystics	Chicago Sky	
(United States) Kathleen Doyle	February 25	Chicago Sky	Bursa BSB (Turkey)	
(Serbia) Tina Krajišnik	February 25	Chicago Sky	Galatasaray S.K. (Turkey)	
(United States) Haley Gorecki	February 26	Indiana Fever	Phoenix Mercury	
(United States) Kiana Williams	March 1	Phoenix Mercury	Seattle Storm	
(United States) Sydney Colson	March 2	Las Vegas Aces	Free agent	
(United States) Destinee Walker	March 3	Dallas Wings		
(United States) Theresa Plaisance	March 3	Las Vegas Aces	Washington Mystics	
(United States) Morgan Bertsch	March 7	Dallas Wings	Connecticut Sun	
(United States) Unique Thompson	March 7	Dallas Wings	Indiana Fever	
(United Kingdom) Kristine Anigwe	March 10	Phoenix Mercury	Los Angeles Sparks	
(United States) Kaela Davis	March 14	Chicago Sky	Galatasaray S.K. (Turkey)	
(Australia) Anneli Maley	March 14	Chicago Sky	Bendigo Spirit (Australia)	
(United States) Imani McGee-Stafford	March 14	Chicago Sky	Free agent	
(United States) Jaime Nared	March 15	Indiana Fever	Antalya (Turkey)	
(Hungary) Bernadett Határ	March 18	Indiana Fever		
(United States) Jantel Lavender	March 21	Seattle Storm	Indiana Fever	
(United States) Lexie Brown	March 30	Chicago Sky		
(United States) Keyona Hayes	April 11	Connecticut Sun	DVTK Miskolc (Hungary)	
(United States) Alexus Dye	April 12	Connecticut Sun	Tennessee	
(Latvia) Aleksa Gulbe	April 12	Connecticut Sun	Indiana	
(United States) Delicia Washington	April 12	Connecticut Sun	Clemson	
(United States) Vivian Gray	April 12	Phoenix Mercury	Texas Tech	
(United States) Sam Thomas	April 12	Phoenix Mercury	Arizona	
(United States) Que Morrison	April 13	Atlanta Dream	Georgia	
(United States) Lexi Held	April 13	Chicago Sky	DePaul	
(United States) Kayla Wells	April 13	Chicago Sky	Texas A&M	
(United States) Deja Winters	April 13	Las Vegas Aces	Minnesota	
(Australia) Chloe Bibby	April 13	Minnesota Lynx	Maryland	
(United States) CeCe Hooks	April 13	Minnesota Lynx	Ohio	
(United States) Maya Dodson	April 13	Phoenix Mercury	Arizona	
(France) Emmanuelle Tahane	April 14	Chicago Sky	Rhode Island	
(United States) Sparkle Taylor	April 14	Chicago Sky	CSM Satu Mare (Romania)	
(United States) Erin Whalen	April 14	Indiana Fever	Dayton	
(United States) Moon Ursin	April 14	Minnesota Lynx	Tulane	
(United States) Jenna Giacone	April 14	Seattle Storm	Dayton	
(United States) Paisley Harding	April 14	Seattle Storm	Brigham Young	
(United States) Raina Perez	April 14	Seattle Storm	North Carolina State	
(United States) Jennifer Coleman	April 14	Washington Mystics	Navy	
(United States) Masseny Kaba	April 15	Chicago Sky	Central Florida	
(United States) Lexi Gordon	April 15	Los Angeles Sparks	Duke	
(Australia) Chantel Horvat	April 15	Los Angeles Sparks	UCLA	
(United States) Lindsey Pulliam	April 16	Chicago Sky	Elazığ (Turkey)	
(United States) Nancy Mulkey	April 16	Las Vegas Aces	Washington	
(United States) Emma Cannon	April 16	Phoenix Mercury	Indiana Fever	
(United States) Katie Benzan	April 20	Washington Mystics	Maryland	
(United States) Reshanda Gray	May 2	Seattle Storm	New York Liberty	
(Nigeria) Victoria Macaulay	May 3	Las Vegas Aces	Bursa (Turkey)	
(United States) Odyssey Sims	May 3	Minnesota Lynx	Atlanta Dream	
(United States) Megan Gustafson	May 4	Phoenix Mercury	Washington Mystics	

=== Waived ===
Player	Date Waived	Former Team	Ref
(Germany) Luisa Geiselsöder	January 6	Dallas Wings	
(United States) Tianna Hawkins	January 13	Atlanta Dream	
(United States) Megan Walker	January 13	Phoenix Mercury	
(United States) Kysre Gondrezick	January 18	Indiana Fever	
(United States) Jazmine Jones	February 4	New York Liberty	
(United States) Leaonna Odom	February 4	New York Liberty	
(United States) Sydney Wiese	February 28	Washington Mystics	
(United States) Aaliyah Wilson	March 2	Indiana Fever	
(United States) Crystal Bradford	March 9	Chicago Sky	
(United States) Jantel Lavender	March 16	Indiana Fever	
(United States) Destiny Slocum	April 8	Las Vegas Aces	
(United States) Emma Cannon	April 13	Indiana Fever	
(United States) Natasha Mack	April 15	Minnesota Lynx	

==== Training camp cuts ====
All players listed did not make the final roster.

Atlanta Dream	Chicago Sky	Connecticut Sun	Dallas Wings
Khaalia Hillsman; Que Morrison; N'dea Jones; Jaylyn Agnew	Kamiah Smalls; Kayla Wells; Lexi Held; Imani McGee-Stafford; Lindsey Pulliam; Anneli Maley; Kaela Davis; Tina Krajišnik; Sparkle Taylor; Kysre Gondrezick	Alexus Dye; Keyona Hayes; Delicia Washington; Jordan Lewis; Taja Cole; Aleksa Gulbe; Kaila Charles; Beatrice Mompremier; Stephanie Jones	Jazz Bond; Chelsea Dungee; Destinee Walker; Unique Thompson
Indiana Fever	Las Vegas Aces	Los Angeles Sparks	Minnesota Lynx
Micaela Kelly; Ali Patberg; Haley Gorecki; Jazmine Jones; Jaime Nared; Ameshya Williams-Holiday; Lindsay Allen; Erin Whalen	Kalani Brown; Faustine Aifuwa; Deja Winters; Nancy Mulkey; Mya Hollingshed; Khayla Pointer	Lauren Cox; Chantel Horvat; Lexi Gordon; T'ea Cooper; Arella Guirantes; Kianna Smith	CeCe Hooks; Chloe Bibby; Moon Ursin; Layshia Clarendon; Crystal Dangerfield; Yvonne Turner; Rennia Davis; Kayla Jones; Hannah Sjerven
New York Liberty	Phoenix Mercury	Seattle Storm	Washington Mystics
Paris Kea	Macee Williams; Mael Gilles; Kiana Williams; Jennie Simms; Emma Cannon; Viivan Gray	Lauren Manis; Jenna Giacone; Paisley Harding; Raina Perez; Elissa Cunane; Kennedy Burke; Mikiah Herbert Harrigan; Evina Westbrook	Christyn Williams; Jamasha Jackson; Megan Gustafson; Erica McCall; Kang Lee-seul; Linnae Harper; Stephanie Mavunga

== Draft ==
=== First round ===
Pick	Player	Date signed	Team	Ref
1	(United States) Rhyne Howard	April 18	Atlanta Dream	
2	(United States) NaLyssa Smith	April 16	Indiana Fever	
3	(United States) Shakira Austin	April 14	Washington Mystics	
4	(United States) Emily Engstler	April 16	Indiana Fever	
5	(Germany) Nyara Sabally	–	New York Liberty	
6	(United States) Lexie Hull	April 17	Indiana Fever	
7	(United States) Veronica Burton	April 13	Dallas Wings	
8	(United States) Mya Hollingshed	April 13	Las Vegas Aces	
9	(United States) Rae Burrell	April 16	Los Angeles Sparks	
10	(United States) Queen Egbo	April 15	Indiana Fever	
11	(United States) Kierstan Bell	April 13	Las Vegas Aces	
12	(United States) Nia Clouden	April 14	Connecticut Sun	

=== Second round ===
Pick	Player	Date signed	Team	Ref
13	(United States) Khayla Pointer	April 13	Las Vegas Aces	
14	(United States) Christyn Williams	April 15	Washington Mystics	
15	(United States) Naz Hillmon	April 18	Atlanta Dream	
16	(United States) Kianna Smith	April 16	Los Angeles Sparks	
17	(United States) Elissa Cunane	April 14	Seattle Storm	
18	(Italy) Lorela Cubaj	–	Seattle Storm	
19	(United States) Olivia Nelson-Ododa	April 17	Los Angeles Sparks	
20	(United States) Destanni Henderson	April 16	Indiana Fever	
21	(United States) Evina Westbrook	April 14	Seattle Storm	
22	(United States) Kayla Jones	April 13	Minnesota Lynx	
23	(United States) Aisha Sheppard	April 13	Las Vegas Aces	
24	(United States) Jordan Lewis	April 15	Connecticut Sun	

=== Third round ===
Pick	Player	Date signed	Team	Ref
25	(United States) Ameshya Williams-Holliday	April 16	Indiana Fever	
26	(United States) Maya Dodson	April 13	Phoenix Mercury	
27	(Australia) Amy Atwell	April 16	Los Angeles Sparks	
28	(United States) Hannah Sjerven	April 13	Minnesota Lynx	
29	(Mali) Sika Koné	–	New York Liberty	
30	(United States) Jasmine Dickey	April 13	Dallas Wings	
31	(United States) Jazz Bond	April 13	Dallas Wings	
32	(United States) Macee Williams	April 13	Phoenix Mercury	
33	(Australia) Jade Melbourne	–	Seattle Storm	
34	(United States) Ali Patberg	April 14	Indiana Fever	
35	(United States) Faustine Aifuwa	April 13	Las Vegas Aces	
36	(United States) Kiara Smith	–	Connecticut Sun	
