= 2022 Indiana Fever season =

23rd season in the WNBA

- Head coach: Marianne Stanley (Until May 25); Carlos Knox (interim)
- Arena: Gainbridge Fieldhouse; Indiana Farmers Coliseum; Hinkle Fieldhouse

Results
- Record: 5–31 (.139)
- Place: 6th (Eastern)
- Playoff finish: Did not qualify

The 2022 Indiana Fever season was the franchise's 23rd season in the Women's National Basketball Association. The regular season tipped off on May 6, 2022, at the Washington Mystics.

The Fever landed the 2nd overall pick in the 2022 WNBA draft - despite having the best odds in the lottery drawing. On February 14, 2022, Tamika Catchings and the Fever parted ways as Vice President of Basketball Operations and General Manager. On February 24, 2022, the Fever announced that former head coach Lin Dunn would serve as interim General Manager for the year.

On May 25, after the team started 2–7, it was announced that the team had dismissed head coach Marianne Stanley. Stanley left after two complete seasons, with an overall record of 14–49. Carlos Knox was announced as the interim coach for the remainder of the season. The team would finish May 3–8. Fortunes would remain similar under Knox, as the team would lose five games in a row after winning the first game Knox coached. They finished June 2–8, with a bright spot being a win over Chicago. The win over Chicago would prove to be their final win of the season. The Fever lost all eleven games they played in July and all four games they played in August to finish the season on an eighteen-game losing streak. Their .139 winning percentage was the worst in franchise history. Their five wins, were also the lowest in franchise history.

== Transactions ==
=== WNBA draft ===
Round	Pick	Player	Nationality	School/team/country
1	2	NaLyssa Smith	United States	Baylor
1	4	Emily Engstler	United States	Louisville
1	6	Lexie Hull	United States	Stanford
1	10	Queen Egbo	United States	Baylor
2	20	Destanni Henderson	United States	South Carolina
3	25	Ameshya Williams-Holliday	United States	Jackson State
3	34	Ali Patberg	United States	Indiana

=== Trades and Roster Changes ===
Date	Transaction
December 1, 2021	Hired Carlos Knox as an Assistant coach
January 1, 2022	Extended Qualifying Offers to Victoria Vivians, Temi Fagbenle, Chelsey Perry, and Bernadett Határ
January 3, 2022	Extended a Qualifying Offer to Lindsay Allen
January 6, 2022	Signed Chelsey Perry to a Qualifying Offer
January 18, 2022	Waived Kysre Gondrezick
February 3, 2022	Traded Julie Allemand and a First Round Pick in 2023 (from Phoenix) to the Chicago Sky in exchange for Bria Hartley (from Phoenix), the 7th Pick in the 2022 WNBA draft (from Chicago), a 2023 First Round Pick (from Chicago), and Second Round Picks in 2022 and 2023 (from Phoenix)
February 4, 2022	Signed Lindsay Allen to a training-camp contract
February 4, 2022	Signed Emma Cannon to a 2-Year Deal
February 9, 2022	Claimed Jazmine Jones off of waivers
February 19, 2022	Signed Michaela Kelly to a training-camp contract
February 21, 2022	Signed Alanna Smith to a training-camp contract
February 26, 2022	Signed Haley Gorecki to a training-camp contract
March 2, 2022	Waived Aaliyah Wilson
March 8, 2022	Traded Teaira McCowan, the 7th Pick in the 2022 WNBA draft, and Chicago's 2023 First Round Pick (Acquired during the Julie Allemand trade) to the Dallas Wings in exchange for the 4th and 6th Picks in the 2022 Draft and a 2023 First Round Pick
March 15, 2022	Signed Jaime Nared to a training-camp contract
March 16, 2022	Waived Jantel Lavender
March 18, 2022	Signed Bernadett Határ to a training-camp contract
April 13, 2022	Waived Emma Cannon
April 14, 2022	Signed Ali Patberg to a rookie-scale contract
April 14, 2022	Signed Erin Whalen to a training-camp contract
April 15, 2022	Signed Queen Egbo to a rookie-scale contract
April 16, 2022	Signed NaLyssa Smith, Destanni Henderson, Emily Engstler, and Ameshya Williams-Holliday to rookie-scale contracts
April 17, 2022	Signed Lexie Hull to a rookie-scale contract
April 20, 2022	Waived Micaela Kelly
April 21, 2022	Suspended the contracts of Bernadett Határ and Chelsey Perry for the full-season
April 21, 2022	Waived Ali Patberg
April 26, 2022	Waived Haley Gorecki
May 1, 2022	Waived Jazmine Jones and Jaime Nared
May 4, 2022	Waived Lindsay Allen, Ameshya Williams-Holliday and Erin Whalen
May 5, 2022	Temporarily Suspend Alaina Coates, Bria Hartley, and Danielle Robinson due to Overseas Commitments
May 6, 2022	Signed Crystal Dangerfield to a Hardship Contract
May 11, 2022	Released Crystal Dangerfield from her Hardship Contract
May 11, 2022	Activated Danielle Robinson and Alaina Coates from their Temporary Suspensions
May 20, 2022	Activated Bria Hartley from her Temporary Suspension
May 25, 2022	Fired Head coach Marianne Stanley and promoted Carlos Knox to Interim Head coach
May 29, 2022	Hired Gary Kloppenburg as an Assistant coach
May 30, 2022	Waived Alanna Smith
June 5, 2022	Signed Emma Cannon
June 7, 2022	Waived Alaina Coates
June 14, 2022	Signed Khayla Pointer
July 15, 2022	Waived Bria Hartley
July 15, 2022	Signed Rennia Davis

== Roster ==
2022 Indiana Fever roster
Players
Coaches

Pos.	No.	Nat.	Name	Height	Weight	DOB	From	Yrs
F	7	(United States)	Cannon, Emma	6' 2" (1.88m)	190 lb (86kg)	1989-06-01	Florida Southern	3
G/F	9	(United States)	Davis, Rennia	6' 1" (1.85m)	170 lb (77kg)	1999-02-24	Tennessee	R
F/C	4	(United States)	Egbo, Queen	6' 4" (1.93m)	190 lb (86kg)	2000-06-29	Baylor	R
F	21	(United States)	Engstler, Emily	6' 1" (1.85m)	180 lb (82kg)	2000-05-01	Louisville	R
G	33	(United States)	Henderson, Destanni	5' 7" (1.7m)	155 lb (70kg)	1999-02-02	South Carolina	R
G	10	(United States)	Hull, Lexie	6' 1" (1.85m)	155 lb (70kg)	1999-09-13	Stanford	R
G	25	(United States)	Mitchell, Tiffany	5' 9" (1.75m)	152 lb (69kg)	1994-09-23	South Carolina	6
G	0	(United States)	Mitchell, Kelsey (injured)	5' 8" (1.73m)	160 lb (73kg)	1995-11-12	Ohio State	4
G	13	(United States)	Pointer, Khayla	5' 7" (1.7m)	146 lb (66kg)	1998-11-25	LSU	R
G	3	(United States)	Robinson, Danielle	5' 9" (1.75m)	137 lb (62kg)	1989-05-10	Oklahoma	10
F	1	(United States)	Smith, NaLyssa	6' 4" (1.93m)	185 lb (84kg)	2000-08-08	Baylor	R
G	35	(United States)	Vivians, Victoria	6' 1" (1.85m)	183 lb (83kg)	1994-11-17	Mississippi State	3

Head coach
(United States) Carlos Knox (IUPUI)
Assistant coaches
(United States) Jhared Simpson (Wheeling)
(United States) Vicki Hall (Texas)
(United States) Gary Kloppenburg (UC San Diego)
Athletic trainer
(United States) Garrett Hueber
Strength and conditioning coach
(United States) Shannon Patterson

Legend

- (C) Team captain
- (DP) Unsigned draft pick
- (FA) Free agent
- (S) Suspended
- Injured

=== Depth ===
Pos.	Starter	Bench
C	Queen Egbo	Emma Cannon
PF	NaLyssa Smith	Emily Engstler
SF	Victoria Vivians	Lexie Hull
SG	Kelsey Mitchell	Tiffany Mitchell; Bria Hartley
PG	Danielle Robinson	Destanni Henderson; Khayla Pointer

== Schedule ==
=== Preseason ===
2022 pre-season game log
Total: 1–1 (Home: 1–0; Road: 0–1)
April: 1–0 (Home: 1–0; Road: 0–0)

Game	Date	Team	Score	High points	High rebounds	High assists	Location Attendance	Record
1	April 30	Chicago	W 79–75	Queen Egbo (15)	Queen Egbo (10)	Kelsey Mitchell (5)	Gainbridge Fieldhouse; N/A	1–0

May: 0–1 (Home: 0–0; Road: 0–1)

Game	Date	Team	Score	High points	High rebounds	High assists	Location Attendance	Record
2	May 2	@ Dallas	L 89–101	Kelsey Mitchell (22)	Queen Egbo (9)	Destanni Henderson (6)	College Park Center; N/A	1–1

2022 pre-season schedule

=== Regular season ===
2022 game log
Total: 5–31 (Home: 3–15; Road: 2–16)
May: 3–8 (Home: 2–5; Road: 1–3)

Game	Date	Team	Score	High points	High rebounds	High assists	Location Attendance	Record
1	May 6	@ Washington	L 70–84	Kelsey Mitchell (18)	NaLyssa Smith (13)	Destanni Henderson (5)	Entertainment and Sports Arena; 4,200	0–1
2	May 8	Los Angeles	L 77–87	Destanni Henderson (19)	NaLyssa Smith (9)	Kelsey Mitchell (7)	Gainbridge Fieldhouse; 1,456	0–2
3	May 10	Minnesota	W 82–76	Kelsey Mitchell (26)	Queen Egbo (8)	Crystal Dangerfield (6)	Gainbridge Fieldhouse; 1,078	1–2
4	May 13	@ New York	W 92–86 (OT)	Kelsey Mitchell (24)	NaLyssa Smith (17)	Queen Egbo (4)	Barclays Center; 3,289	2–2
5	May 15	Atlanta	L 79–85	Kelsey Mitchell (27)	Queen Egbo (9)	K. Mitchell; Robinson (4)	Gainbridge Fieldhouse; 1,745	2–3
6	May 17	Atlanta	L 79–101	Victoria Vivians (16)	Emily Engstler (10)	Kelsey Mitchell (5)	Gainbridge Fieldhouse; 960	2–4
7	May 20	@ Connecticut	L 85–94	Kelsey Mitchell (23)	Queen Egbo (7)	Danielle Robinson (6)	Mohegan Sun Arena; 4,428	2–5
8	May 22	Connecticut	L 70–92	Victoria Vivians (15)	Queen Egbo (8)	Kelsey Mitchell (5)	Gainbridge Fieldhouse; 2,612	2–6
9	May 24	@ Chicago	L 90–95	Kelsey Mitchell (25)	Emily Engstler (13)	Engstler; T. Mitchell (4)	Wintrust Arena; 7,741	2–7
10	May 27	Los Angeles	W 101–96	Kelsey Mitchell (22)	Emily Engstler (9)	Danielle Robinson (11)	Indiana Farmers Coliseum; 1,417	3–7
11	May 31	Washington	L 75–87	Kelsey Mitchell (26)	Queen Egbo (10)	K. Mitchell; Vivians (4)	Indiana Farmers Coliseum; 1,009	3–8

June : 2–8 (Home: 1–2; Road: 1–6)

Game	Date	Team	Score	High points	High rebounds	High assists	Location Attendance	Record
12	June 1	@ New York	L 74–87	Kelsey Mitchell (17)	Egbo; Robinson; N. Smith (6)	K. Mitchell; N. Smith; Vivians (4)	Barclays Center; 4,079	3–9
13	June 5	@ Atlanta	L 66–75	Kelsey Mitchell (20)	Queen Egbo (8)	Destanni Henderson (5)	Gateway Center Arena; 3,000	3–10
14	June 8	@ Connecticut	L 69–88	NaLyssa Smith (19)	NaLyssa Smith (7)	Kelsey Mitchell (5)	Mohegan Sun Arena; 4,088	3–11
15	June 10	New York	L 83–97	Kelsey Mitchell (23)	NaLyssa Smith (9)	K. Mitchell; Vivians (4)	Indiana Farmers Coliseum; 1,393	3–12
16	June 12	@ Minnesota	W 84–80	NaLyssa Smith (21)	NaLyssa Smith (14)	Danielle Robinson (6)	Target Center; 6,806	4–12
17	June 15	Phoenix	L 93–80	Kelsey Mitchell (26)	NaLyssa Smith (14)	Danielle Robinson (6)	Indiana Farmers Coliseum; 1,824	4–13
18	June 19	Chicago	W 89–87	NaLyssa Smith (26)	NaLyssa Smith (11)	Kelsey Mitchell (9)	Indiana Farmers Coliseum; 1,706	5–13
19	June 23	@ Dallas	L 68–94	Kelsey Mitchell (22)	Queen Egbo (12)	Danielle Robinson (5)	College Park Center; 2,791	5–14
20	June 27	@ Phoenix	L 71–83	Kelsey Mitchell (22)	NaLyssa Smith (10)	K. Mitchell; Robinson (4)	Footprint Center; 5,044	5–15
21	June 29	@ Phoenix	L 78–99	Kelsey Mitchell (21)	Emily Engstler (8)	Kelsey Mitchell (5)	Footprint Center; 5,833	5–16

July : 0–11 (Home: 0–7; Road: 0–4)

Game	Date	Team	Score	High points	High rebounds	High assists	Location Attendance	Record
22	July 1	@ Seattle	L 57–73	Queen Egbo (14)	Queen Egbo (12)	Tiffany Mitchell (3)	Climate Pledge Arena; 8,565	5–17
23	July 5	Seattle	L 73–95	Kelsey Mitchell (21)	Robinson; Vivians (6)	Danielle Robinson (4)	Indiana Farmers Coliseum; 2,585	5–18
24	July 7	Chicago	L 84–93	Kelsey Mitchell (27)	NaLyssa Smith (11)	K. Mitchell; Robinson (5)	Indiana Farmers Coliseum; 1,839	5–19
25	July 13	Connecticut	L 81–89	Kelsey Mitchell (21)	NaLyssa Smith (13)	Engstler; Vivians (4)	Indiana Farmers Coliseum; 3,212	5–20
26	July 15	Minnesota	L 77–87	Tiffany Mitchell (18)	NaLyssa Smith (9)	Engstler; K. Mitchell (4)	Indiana Farmers Coliseum; 1,530	5–21
27	July 17	@ Seattle	L 65–81	NaLyssa Smith (15)	NaLyssa Smith (9)	K. Mitchell; Robinson (4)	Climate Pledge Arena; 9,970	5–22
28	July 19	@ Los Angeles	L 79–86	Tiffany Mitchell (22)	Queen Egbo (9)	K. Mitchell; Robinson (5)	Crypto.com Arena; 5,478	5–23
29	July 21	@ Las Vegas	L 77–90	NaLyssa Smith (24)	Queen Egbo (8)	Kelsey Mitchell (7)	Michelob Ultra Arena; 5,737	5–24
30	July 24	Dallas	L 86–96	Kelsey Mitchell (34)	Victoria Vivians (6)	Kelsey Mitchell (6)	Hinkle Fieldhouse; 1,048	5–25
31	July 29	Las Vegas	L 72–93	Queen Egbo (13)	NaLyssa Smith (10)	Engstler; Henderson; K. Mitchell; Robinson (4)	Hinkle Fieldhouse; 1,828	5–26
32	July 31	Las Vegas	L 69–94	NaLyssa Smith (18)	NaLyssa Smith (13)	Destanni Henderson (4)	Hinkle Fieldhouse; 1,822	5–27

August : 0–4 (Home: 0–1; Road: 0–3)

Game	Date	Team	Score	High points	High rebounds	High assists	Location Attendance	Record
33	August 3	@ Atlanta	L 81–91	NaLyssa Smith (21)	Emma Cannon (8)	Victoria Vivians (6)	Gateway Center Arena; 2,071	5–28
34	August 6	@ Dallas	L 91–95 (OT)	Lexie Hull (17)	Emma Cannon (8)	Danielle Robinson (8)	College Park Center; 4,184	5–29
35	August 12	Washington	L 70–82	Emily Engstler (18)	Emma Cannon (8)	Destanni Henderson (6)	Hinkle Fieldhouse; 1,700	5–30
36	August 14	@ Washington	L 83–95	Tiffany Mitchell (18)	Egbo; Engstler; N. Smith (4)	Tiffany Mitchell (7)	Entertainment and Sports Arena; 4,200	5–31

2022 season schedule

== Standings ==
#	Team	W	L	PCT	GB	Conf.	Home	Road	Cup
1	x – Las Vegas Aces	26	10	.722	–	15–3	13–5	13–5	9–1
2	x – Chicago Sky	26	10	.722	–	15–3	14–4	12–6	9–1
3	x – Connecticut Sun	25	11	.694	1.0	11–7	13–5	12–6	5–5
4	x – Seattle Storm	22	14	.611	4.0	10–8	13–5	9–9	6–4
5	x – Washington Mystics	22	14	.611	4.0	11–7	12–6	10–8	5–5
6	x – Dallas Wings	18	18	.500	8.0	8–10	8–10	10–8	5–5
7	x – New York Liberty	16	20	.444	10.0	10–8	9–9	7–11	6–4
8	x – Phoenix Mercury	15	21	.417	11.0	7–11	11–7	4–14	3–7
9	e – Minnesota Lynx	14	22	.389	12.0	8–10	7–11	7–11	4–6
10	e – Atlanta Dream	14	22	.389	12.0	5–13	8–10	6–12	3–7
11	e – Los Angeles Sparks	13	23	.361	13.0	6–12	7–11	6–12	3–7
12	e – Indiana Fever	5	31	.139	21.0	2–16	3–15	2–16	2–8

Notes

(#) – League Standing
x – Clinched playoff berth
e – Eliminated from playoff contention
Source: Overall standings and Commissioner's Cup Standings

== Statistics ==
Legend
GP	Games played	GS	Games started	MPG	Minutes per game	RPG	Rebounds per game
APG	Assists per game	SPG	Steals per game	BPG	Blocks per game	PPG	Points per game
FG%	Field-goal percentage	3P%	3-point field-goal percentage	FT%	Free-throw percentage	TO	Turnovers per game
PF	Fouls per game		Team leader		League leader

=== Regular season ===
Player	GP	GS	MPG	FG%	3P%	FT%	RPG	APG	SPG	BPG	PPG
Kelsey Mitchell	31	31	32.6	.438	.409	.861	1.9	4.2	0.9	0.2	18.4
NaLyssa Smith	32	32	30.7	.419	.381	.618	7.9	1.4	0.5	0.3	13.5
Victoria Vivians	35	30	26.9	.336	.280	.742	3.6	2.4	1.1	0.3	9.8
Danielle Robinson	31	30	23.6	.419	.225	.850	2.9	3.8	0.7	0.2	7.4
Queen Egbo	33	31	21.8	.442	.000	.645	6.3	0.9	0.9	1.2	7.2
Emma Cannon^{≠}	23	2	14.3	.522	.500	.739	3.2	0.5	0.6	0.1	7.0
Tiffany Mitchell	34	8	16.3	.451	.387	.865	1.2	1.2	0.8	0.1	6.5
Crystal Dangerfield^{‡}	3	0	16.3	.429	.333	1.000	1.0	3.3	0.0	0.7	6.0
Destanni Henderson	36	5	16.4	.401	.366	.719	1.6	2.5	0.8	0.1	5.3
Emily Engstler	35	6	18.2	.396	.356	.553	5.2	1.5	0.7	1.1	5.2
Alanna Smith^{‡}	9	1	12.9	.333	.240	.714	2.7	0.6	0.9	0.7	4.3
Lexie Hull	26	4	12.8	.267	.186	.900	1.5	0.7	0.6	0.1	3.8
Alaina Coates^{‡}	8	0	9.4	.636	.000	.933	2.0	0.3	0.3	0.4	3.5
Bria Hartley^{‡}	10	0	8.7	.346	.333	.667	1.0	1.0	0.1	0.0	2.5
Khayla Pointer^{≠}	10	0	5.8	.583	.250	.500	0.8	0.2	0.2	0.0	2.2
Rennia Davis^{≠}	7	0	5.7	.333	.000	.000	1.1	0.1	0.3	0.0	1.1

^{‡}Waived/Released during the season
^{†}Traded during the season
^{≠}Acquired during the season

== Awards and honors ==
Recipient	Award	Date awarded	Ref.
Kelsey Mitchell	Eastern Conference Player of the Week	May 31	
NaLyssa Smith	WNBA All-Rookie Team	August 25	
Queen Egbo	WNBA All-Rookie Team	August 25	
