= Mya Hollingshed =

Puerto Rican basketball player

Greensboro Groove
- Position: Center
- League: UpShot League

Personal information
- Born: October 29, 1999 (age 27) Houston, Texas, U.S.
- Listed height: 6 ft 3 in (1.91 m)
- Listed weight: 160 lb (73 kg)

Career information
- High school: Bellaire High School (Texas)
- College: Colorado (2017–2022)
- WNBA draft: 2022: 1st round, 8th overall pick
- Drafted by: Las Vegas Aces

Career highlights
- 2× All Pac-12 (2021, 2022)
- Stats at Basketball Reference

Mya Hollingshed (born October 29, 1999) is a Puerto Rican professional basketball player who currently plays Greensboro Groove of the UpShot League. She was drafted as the 8th pick by the Las Vegas Aces in 2022. She played college basketball at the University of Colorado.

== High school ==
Hollingshed was a four-year letterwinner at Bellaire High School. She was a team captain and earned all-state honors. Hollingshed was a McDonald's All-American nominee and competed with the Texas Elite Phenoms AAU.

Hollingshed was an Adidas and Under Armor All-American.

== College career ==
Hollingshed was a reserve player her freshman year, averaging 6.8 points and 3.9 rebounds over 29 games. She led the team with a 42.7% 3-point shooting accuracy, and she shot 45.5% from the floor.

Hollingshed started every game as a sophomore and had career-high numbers in points per game and minutes, and she led the team with a .439 field goal percentage. Hollingshed recorded her first double double as a sophomore.

As a junior, Hollingshed posted career-high points, rebounds, and assists totals and had three double-doubles. She led the team in scoring and rebounding and was tied for team lead in steals. She was named to the preseason All-PAC 12 team as an honorable mention.

Hollingshed joined the 1,000 point club as a senior and scored in double figures in 20 of 23 games. Hollingshed was selected to the All-PAC 12 First Team and received an All-America honorable mention. She led Colorado to their first NCAA Tournament berth in years.

== Professional career ==
Hollingshed was picked by the Las Vegas Aces 8th overall in the 2022 WNBA draft. She was the sixth University of Colorado player ever drafted and the first since 2013.

On May 2, 2022 (exactly 3 weeks after being drafted), the Aces waived both Hollingshed and the 13th overall pick Khayla Pointer.

As of 2025, Hollingshed has yet to play a game in the WNBA.

On May 11, 2026, it was announced that Hollingshed had join the Greensboro Groove of the UpShot League for their inaugural season.

== International Play ==
Hollingshed represents Puerto Rico in international play. She competed in the 2022 FIBA World Cup. She led Puerto Rico to its first quarterfinals.

== Personal life ==
Hollingshed was born in Houston, Texas. Her grandfather, Terry Sykes, was selected in the 1978 NBA draft by the Washington Bullets.
