= 2022 WNBA draft =

Basketball player selection

2022 WNBA Draft

General information
- Sport: Basketball
- Date: April 11, 2022
- Location: New York City
- Networks: United States: ESPN; Canada: TSN1/4

Overview
- League: WNBA
- Teams: 12
- First selection: Rhyne Howard; Atlanta Dream

The 2022 WNBA Draft, the WNBA's draft for the 2022 WNBA season, was held on April 11, 2022, in New York City and aired live on ESPN in the United States and on TSN1/4 in Canada at 7:00 p.m. EDT. The draft was the 27th in WNBA history.

== Draft lottery ==
The lottery selection to determine the order of the top four picks in the 2022 draft took place on December 19, 2021 and was televised on ESPN in the United States and on TSN2 in Canada. The four non-playoff teams in 2021 qualified for the lottery drawing: Atlanta Dream, Indiana Fever, Washington Mystics, and the Los Angeles Sparks. With the Sparks having previously traded their 2022 first-round pick, their lottery pick belonged to the Dallas Wings at the time of the lottery. The Mystics won the lottery and had the first pick in the draft. This was the first time that the Mystics won the lottery in franchise history. The next three picks initially belonged to the Fever, Dream, and Wings. However, by the time of the draft, the only one of the top four picks that still belonged to the same team was that of the Fever. In March 2022, the Wings included their lottery pick in a larger trade with the Fever. Less than a week before the draft, the Mystics and Dream would swap their top-three picks, with the Mystics also sending the Dream a 2022 second-round pick and the rights to swap picks with the Sparks in 2023.

=== Lottery chances ===
Note: Team selected for the No. 1 pick noted in bold text.

Team	Combined 2020–21 record	Lottery chances	Result
Indiana Fever	12–42	44.2%	2nd pick
Atlanta Dream	15–39	27.6%	3rd pick
**Washington Mystics**	**21–33**	**17.8%**	**1st pick**
Dallas Wings (from Los Angeles)	27–27 (Note: Los Angeles' record)	10.4%	4th pick

The lottery odds were based on combined records from the 2020 and 2021 WNBA seasons. In the drawing, 14 balls numbered 1–14 are placed in a lottery machine and mixed. Four balls are drawn to determine a four-digit combination (only 11–12–13–14 is ignored and redrawn). The team to which that four-ball combination is assigned receives the No. 1 pick. The four balls are then placed back into the machine and the process is repeated to determine the second pick. The two teams whose numerical combinations do not come up in the lottery will select in the inverse order of their two-year cumulative record. Ernst & Young knows the discreet results before they are announced.

The order of selection for the remainder of the first round as well as the second and third rounds was determined by inverse order of the teams' respective regular-season records solely from 2021.

== Eligibility ==
Under the current collective bargaining agreement (CBA) between the WNBA and its players' union, draft eligibility for players not defined as "international" requires the following to be true:

- The player's 22nd birthday falls during the calendar year of the draft. For this draft, the cutoff birth date is December 31, 2000.
- She has either:
  - completed her college eligibility;
  - received a bachelor's degree, or is scheduled to receive such in the 3 months following the draft; or
  - is at least 4 years removed from high school graduation.

A player who is scheduled to receive her bachelor's degree within 3 months of the draft date, and is younger than the cutoff age, is only eligible if the calendar year of the draft is no earlier than the fourth after her high school graduation.

Players with remaining college eligibility who meet the cutoff age must notify the WNBA headquarters of their intent to enter the draft no later than 10 days before the draft date, and must renounce any remaining college eligibility to do so. A separate notification timetable is provided for players involved in postseason tournaments (most notably the NCAA Division I tournament); those players (normally) must declare for the draft within 24 hours of their final game.

"International players" are defined as those for whom all of the following is true:

- Born and currently residing outside the U.S.
- Never "exercised intercollegiate basketball eligibility" in the U.S.

For "international players", the eligibility age is 20, also measured on December 31 of the year of the draft.

== Draft ==
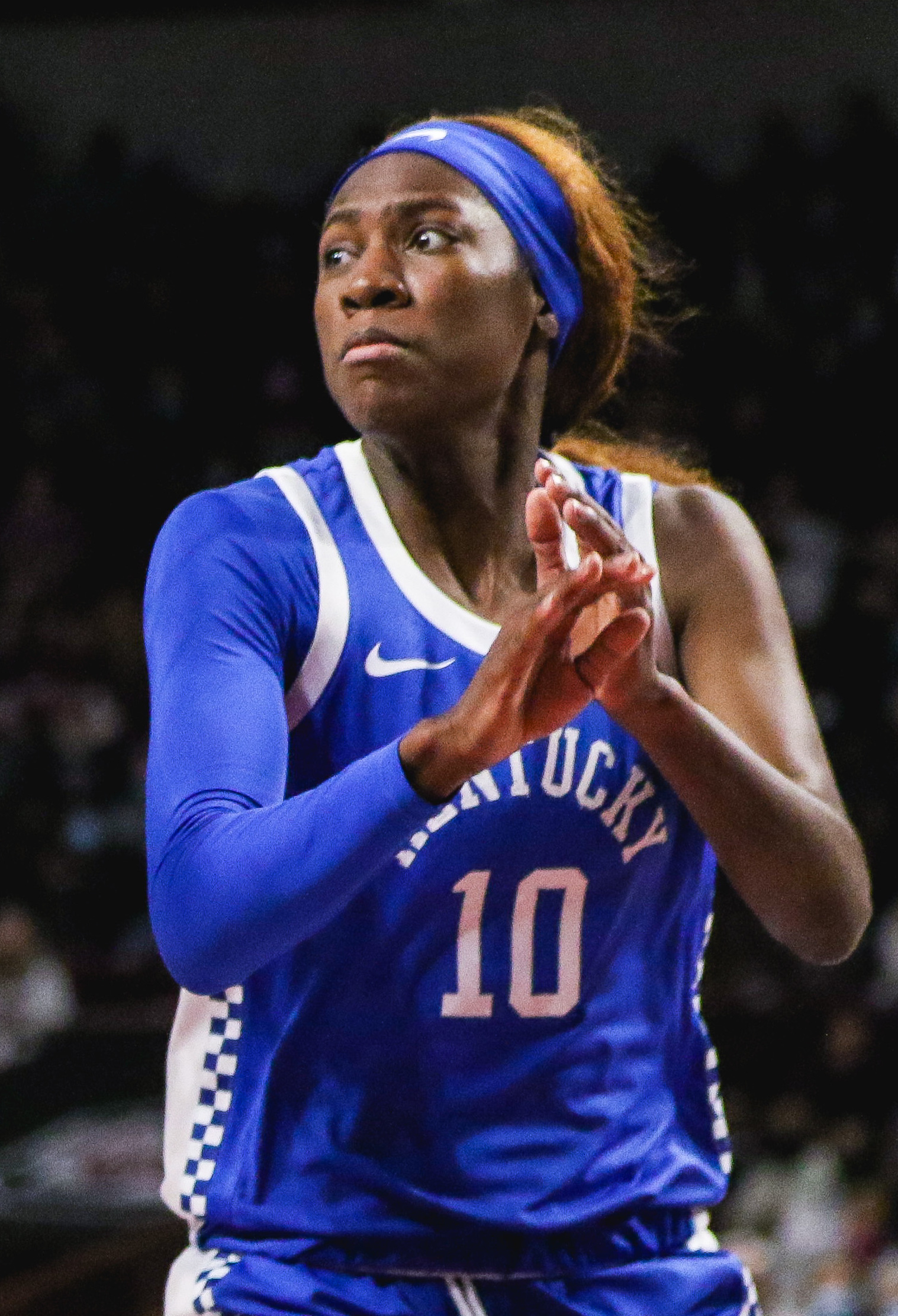
Rhyne Howard was selected 1st overall by the Atlanta Dream.

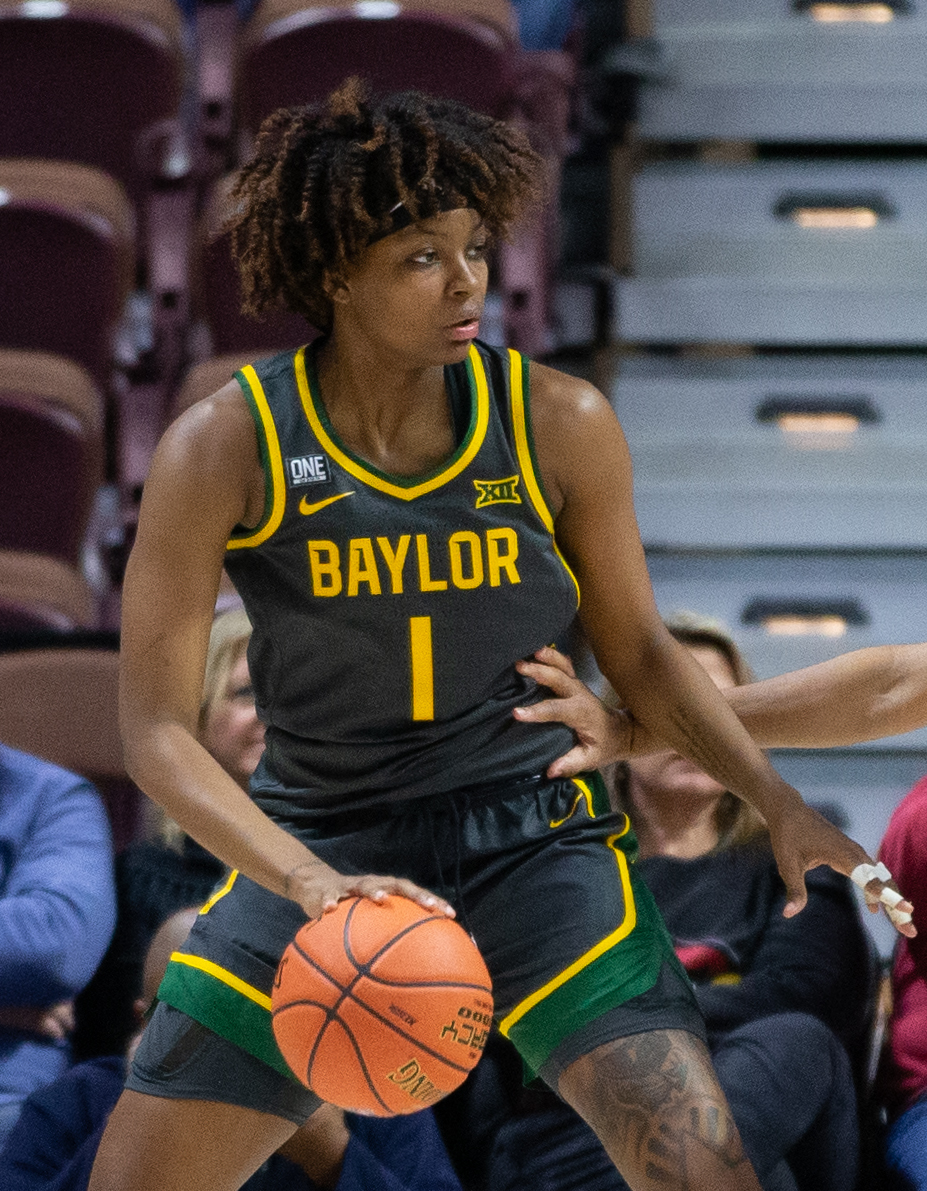
NaLyssa Smith was selected 2nd overall by the Indiana Fever.

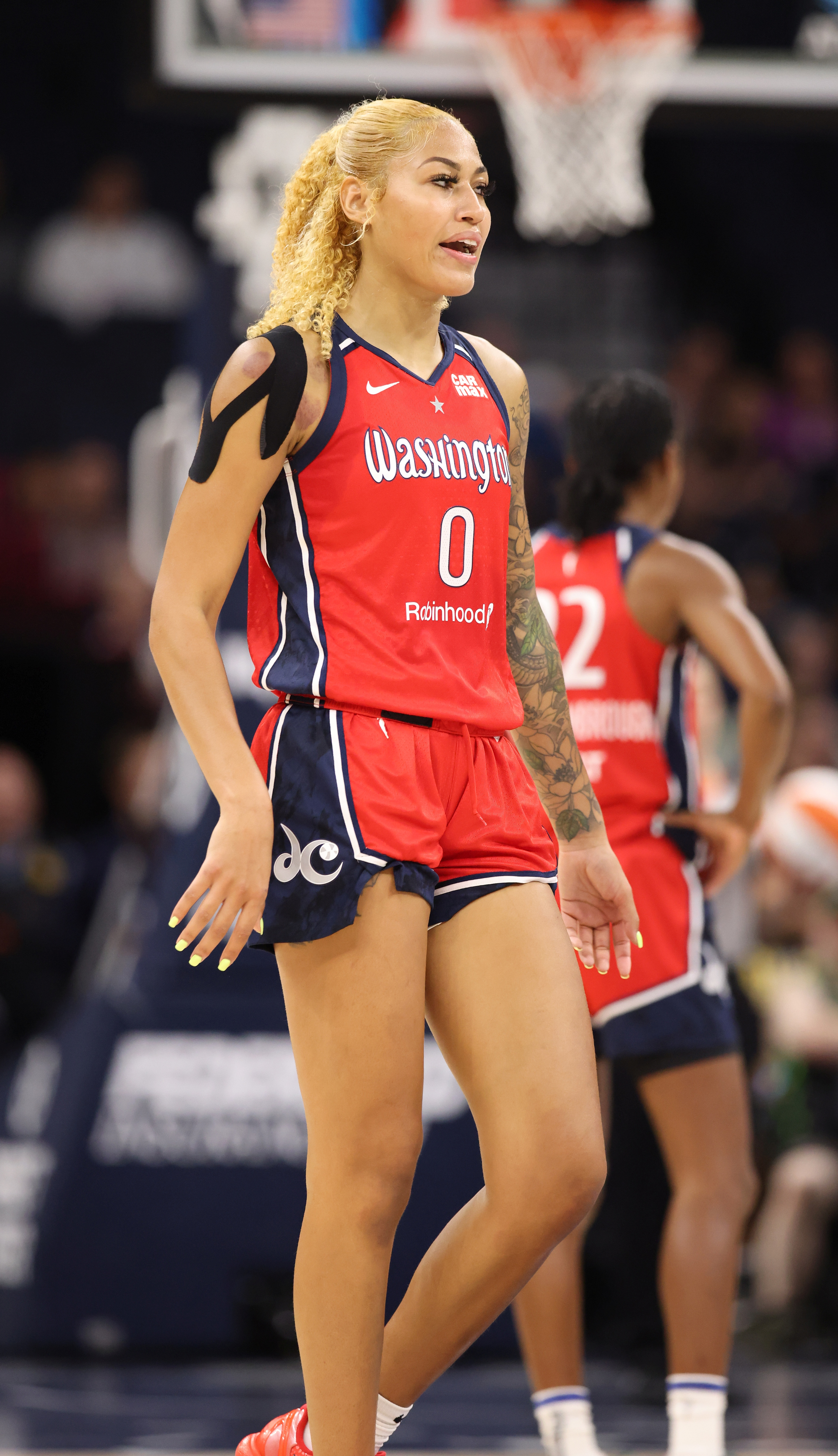
Shakira Austin was selected 3rd overall by the Washington Mystics.

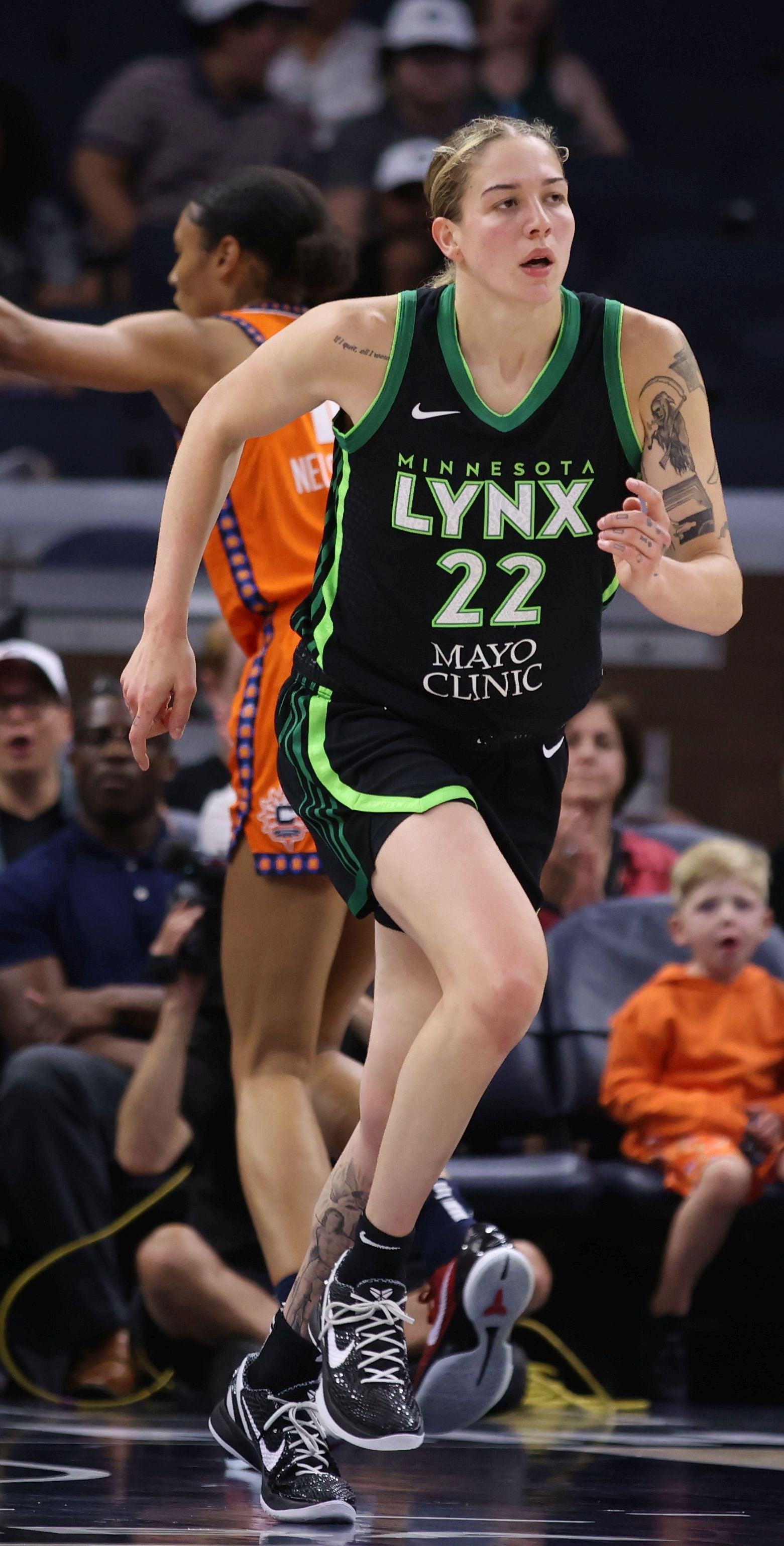
Emily Engstler was selected 4th overall by the Indiana Fever.

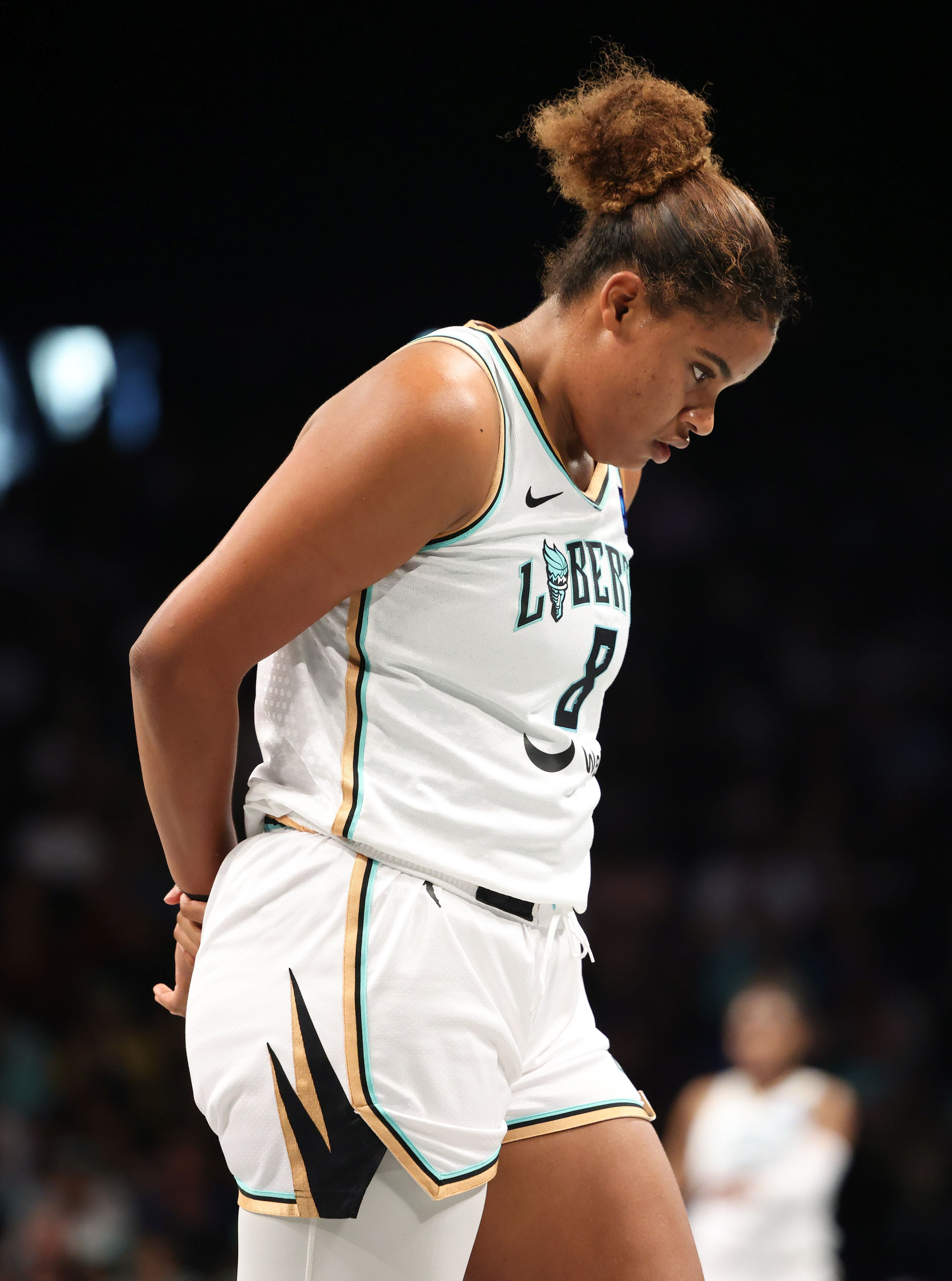
Nyara Sabally was selected 5th overall by the New York Liberty.

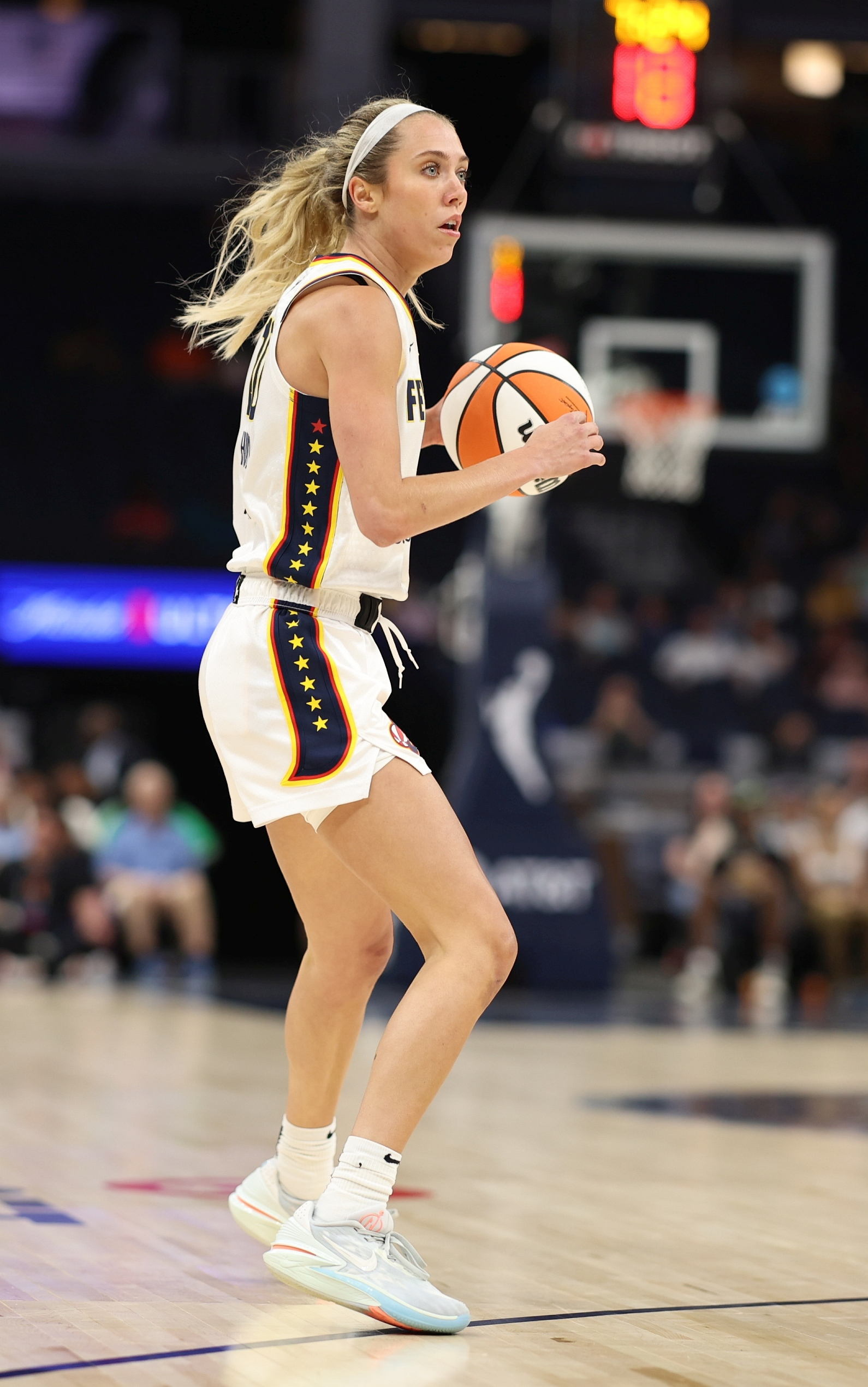
Lexie Hull was selected 6th overall by the Indiana Fever.

*	Denotes player who has been selected for at least one All-Star Game and All-WNBA Team
^{x}	Denotes player who has been selected for at least one All-WNBA Team
**Bold**	Denotes player who won Rookie of the Year

=== First round ===
Pick	Player	Nationality	Team	School / club team
1	**Rhyne Howard** ^{*}	United States	Atlanta Dream (from Washington) (Note: April 6, 2022: Washington to Atlanta: Atlanta acquired a 2022 first-round pick (1st overall); Washington acquired 2022 first-round and second-round picks (3rd and 14th overall), and the right to swap picks with Los Angeles in 2023)	Kentucky
2	NaLyssa Smith	United States	Indiana Fever	Baylor
3	Shakira Austin ^{x}	United States	Washington Mystics (from Atlanta)	Ole Miss
4	Emily Engstler	United States	Indiana Fever (from Los Angeles via Dallas) (Note: March 8, 2022: Dallas to Indiana: Dallas acquired Teaira McCowan, a 2022 first-round pick, and Chicago's 2023 first-round pick; Indiana acquired 2022 first-round picks and a 2023 first-round pick) (Note: April 14, 2021: Los Angeles to Dallas: Los Angeles acquired 2021 first-round and 2022 second-round picks; Dallas acquired a 2022 first-round pick)	Louisville
5	Nyara Sabally	Germany	New York Liberty	Oregon
6	Lexie Hull	United States	Indiana Fever (from Dallas)	Stanford
7	Veronica Burton	United States	Dallas Wings (from Chicago via Dallas and Indiana) (Note: June 2, 2021: Dallas to Chicago: Chicago acquired Dana Evans and a 2022 first-round pick; Dallas acquired Shyla Heal, 2022 first- and third-round picks) (Note: February 3, 2022: Chicago to Indiana (three-team trade with Phoenix): Chicago acquired Julie Allemand and 2023 first-round pick from Phoenix; Indiana acquired Bria Hartley, 2022 and 2023 first-round picks from Chicago, and 2022 and 2023 second-round picks from Phoenix; Phoenix acquired Diamond DeShields)	Northwestern
8	Mya Hollingshed^{#}	Puerto Rico	Las Vegas Aces (from Minnesota via Phoenix, New York, and Seattle) (Note: April 10, 2022: Minnesota to Las Vegas: Minnesota acquired Vegas's 1st and 2nd Round Picks in 2023; Las Vegas acquired the 8th and 13th Picks in 2022) (Note: February 10, 2021: Phoenix to New York: Phoenix acquired Kia Nurse and Megan Walker; New York acquired 2021 and 2022 first-round picks) (Note: February 10, 2021: New York to Seattle: New York acquired Natasha Howard; Seattle acquired 2021 first-round and 2022 second-round picks, and Phoenix's 2022 first-round pick) (Note: February 11, 2021: Seattle to Minnesota: Seattle acquired Mikiah Herbert Harrigan; Minnesota acquired Phoenix's 2022 first-round pick)	Colorado
9	Rae Burrell	United States	Los Angeles Sparks (from Seattle) (Note: February 3, 2022: Seattle to Los Angeles: Seattle acquired Gabby Williams; Los Angeles acquired Katie Lou Samuelson, 2022 first-round pick)	Tennessee
10	Queen Egbo	United States	Indiana Fever (from Minnesota) (Note: February 15, 2021: Minnesota to Indiana: Minnesota acquired Indiana's 2022 second-round pick; Indiana acquired Odyssey Sims, Temi Fagbenle, Minnesota's 2022 first- and third-round picks)	Baylor
11	Kierstan Bell	United States	Las Vegas Aces	Florida Gulf Coast
12	Nia Clouden	United States	Connecticut Sun	Michigan State

=== Second round ===
Pick	Player	Nationality	Team	School / club team
13	Khayla Pointer	United States	Las Vegas Aces (from Minnesota via Indiana)	LSU
14	Christyn Williams	United States	Washington Mystics (from Atlanta)	UConn
15	Naz Hillmon	United States	Atlanta Dream (from Los Angeles) (Note: February 5, 2022: Los Angeles to Atlanta: Atlanta acquired Erica Wheeler, a 2023 first-round pick, and a 2022 second-round pick; Los Angeles acquired Chennedy Carter and the rights to Li Yueru)	Michigan
16	Kianna Smith	United States	Los Angeles Sparks (from Washington) (Note: May 13, 2021: Washington to Los Angeles: Washington acquired Sydney Wiese; Los Angeles acquired Washington's 2022 second-round pick)	Louisville
17	Elissa Cunane	United States	Seattle Storm (from New York)	NC State
18	Lorela Cubaj	Italy	Seattle Storm (from Dallas) (Note: February 10, 2021: Seattle to Dallas: Seattle acquired Katie Lou Samuelson and a 2022 second-round pick; Dallas acquired New York's 2021 first-round pick)	Georgia Tech
19	Olivia Nelson-Ododa	United States	Los Angeles Sparks (from Chicago via Dallas) (Note: February 9, 2021: Chicago to Dallas: Chicago acquired a 2021 second-round pick; Dallas acquired Chicago's 2022 second-round pick) (Note: April 14, 2021: Dallas to Los Angeles: Dallas acquired a 2022 first-round pick; Los Angeles acquired 2021 first-round and 2022 second-round picks)	UConn
20	Destanni Henderson	United States	Indiana Fever (from Phoenix) (Note: February 3, 2022: Phoenix to Indiana (three-team trade with Chicago) → see Chicago to Indiana (note D))	South Carolina
21	Evina Westbrook	United States	Seattle Storm	UConn
22	Kayla Jones^{#}	United States	Minnesota Lynx	NC State
23	Aisha Sheppard	United States	Las Vegas Aces	Virginia Tech
24	Jordan Lewis^{#}	United States	Connecticut Sun	Baylor

=== Third round ===
Pick	Player	Nationality	Team	School / club team
25	Ameshya Williams-Holliday^{#}	United States	Indiana Fever	Jackson State
26	Maya Dodson^{#}	United States	Phoenix Mercury (from Atlanta) (Note: February 13, 2021: Phoenix to Atlanta: Phoenix acquired a 2022 third-round pick; Atlanta acquired Yvonne Turner)	Notre Dame
27	Amy Atwell	Australia	Los Angeles Sparks	Hawaii
28	Hannah Sjerven	United States	Minnesota Lynx (from Washington) (Note: February 5, 2021: Minnesota to Washington: Minnesota acquired a 2022 third-round pick; Washington acquired Erica McCall)	South Dakota
29	Sika Koné	Mali	New York Liberty	CB Islas Canarias (Spain)
30	Jasmine Dickey	United States	Dallas Wings	Delaware
31	Jazz Bond^{#}	United States	Dallas Wings (from Chicago)	North Florida
32	Macee Williams^{#}	United States	Phoenix Mercury	IUPUI
33	Jade Melbourne	Australia	Seattle Storm	Canberra Capitals (Australia)
34	Ali Patberg^{#}	United States	Indiana Fever (from Minnesota)	Indiana
35	Faustine Aifuwa^{#}	United States	Las Vegas Aces	LSU
36	Kiara Smith^{#}	United States	Connecticut Sun	Florida

== See also ==
- List of first overall WNBA draft picks
