= Victoria Vivians =

American basketball player (born 1994)

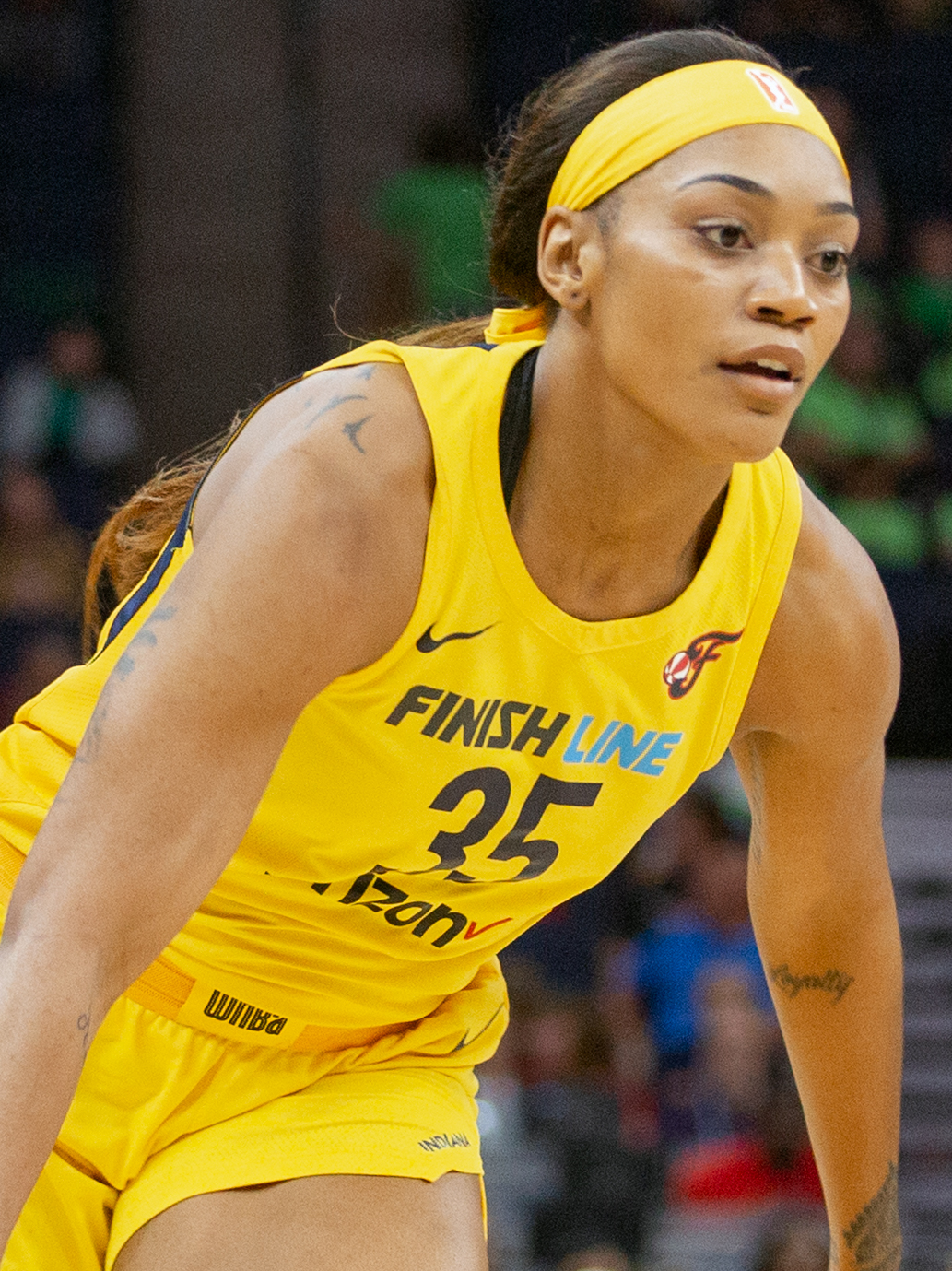
- Vivians with the Indiana Fever in 2018

Adelitas de Chihuahua
- Position: Shooting guard
- League: Liga Nacional de Baloncesto Profesional Femenil

Personal information
- Born: November 17, 1994 (age 31) Jackson, Mississippi, U.S.
- Listed height: 6 ft 1 in (1.85 m)
- Listed weight: 197 lb (89 kg)

Career information
- High school: Scott Central (Forest, Mississippi)
- College: Mississippi State (2014–2018)
- WNBA draft: 2018: 1st round, 8th overall pick
- Drafted by: Indiana Fever
- Playing career: 2018–present

Career history

Playing
- 2018–2023: Indiana Fever
- 2024: Seattle Storm
- 2025–: Adelitas de Chihuahua

Coaching
- 2024-2026: Mississippi State (Assistant)
- 2026-Present: Texas (Assistant)

Career highlights
- Ann Meyers Drysdale Award (2018); WBCA Coaches' All-American (2018); All-American – USBWA (2018); 4x Gillom Trophy (2015–2018); First-team All-American – AP (2018); Third-team All-American – AP (2017); 3× First-team All-SEC (2016–2018); Second-team All-SEC (2015); SEC All-Freshman Team (2015); 2× Mississippi Miss Basketball (2013, 2014)
- Stats at Basketball Reference

Victoria Vivians (born November 17, 1994) is an American professional basketball player for Adelitas de Chihuahua of the Liga Nacional de Baloncesto Profesional Femenil (LNBPF). She is also an assistant coach for the Mississippi State Bulldogs, her alma mater. She helped lead the Bulldogs to four appearances in the NCAA tournament, including three Sweet Sixteens, and two appearances in the championship game in 2017 and 2018. Vivians was chosen eighth overall by the Indiana Fever in the 2018 WNBA draft.

== Early life and education ==
Vivians is the daughter of John and Angela Vivians and Deborah Peatry. She graduated from Scott Central High School and, then, attended and played basketball at the Mississippi State University, from which she graduated with a degree in Family Science. In 2017, she was voted MSU Homecoming Queen.

== Professional career ==
Vivians was chosen eighth overall by the Indiana Fever in the 2018 WNBA draft on April 12, 2018.

On March 25, 2024, Vivians signed with the Seattle Storm.

In May 2025, Vivians signed with the Adelitas de Chihuahua of the Liga Nacional de Baloncesto Profesional Femenil.

Vivians has also played in France, Hungary, Israel, and Spain.

== Career statistics ==
Legend
GP	Games played	GS	Games started	MPG	Minutes per game	RPG	Rebounds per game
APG	Assists per game	SPG	Steals per game	BPG	Blocks per game	PPG	Points per game
TO	Turnovers per game	FG%	Field-goal percentage	3P%	3-point field-goal percentage	FT%	Free-throw percentage
**Bold**	Career best	°	League leader

=== WNBA ===
==== Regular season ====
Stats current through end of 2024 season

WNBA regular season statistics
Year	Team	GP	GS	MPG	FG%	3P%	FT%	RPG	APG	SPG	BPG	TO	PPG
2018	Indiana	34	26	**27.1**	**.404**	**.399**	**.931**	3.1	1.2	0.9	0.1	1.0	8.9
2019	Did not play (injury)												
2020	Indiana	6	0	14.2	.345	.182	.875	2.3	0.5	0.2	0.0	1.0	4.8
2021	Indiana	31	8	21.3	.333	.252	.833	3.1	1.3	**1.1**	0.1	1.3	6.8
2022	Indiana	35	**30**	26.9	.336	.280	.742	**3.6**	**2.4**	**1.1**	**0.3**	2.1	**9.8**
2023	Indiana	**38**	14	17.7	.380	.287	.767	3.1	1.3	0.7	0.2	0.8	5.2
2024	Seattle	35	15	12.8	.333	.319	.667	2.0	0.8	0.4	0.2	**0.6**	3.1
**Career**	6 years, 2 teams	179	93	20.8	.357	.309	.798	3.0	1.4	0.8	0.2	1.1	6.6

==== Playoffs ====
WNBA playoff statistics
Year	Team	GP	GS	MPG	FG%	3P%	FT%	RPG	APG	SPG	BPG	TO	PPG
2024	Seattle	1	0	7.0	.000	—	—	0.0	0.0	0.0	0.0	0.0	0.0
**Career**	1 year, 1 team	1	0	7.0	.000	—	—	0.0	0.0	0.0	0.0	0.0	0.0

=== College ===
NCAA statistics
Year	Team	GP	Points	FG%	3P%	FT%	RPG	APG	SPG	BPG	PPG
2014–15	Mississippi State	34	505	.368	.327	.746	5.0	1.0	1.4	**0.4**	14.9
2015–16	Mississippi State	36	616	.382	.309	.732	5.8	1.0	**1.7**	0.3	17.1
2016–17	Mississippi State	**39**	633	.372	.280	.761	4.2	1.5	1.4	0.3	16.2
2017–18	Mississippi State	**39**	**773**	**.485**	**.404**	**.809**	**6.1**	**1.9**	1.4	0.3	**19.8**
**Career**		148	2,527	.404	.324	.765	5.3	1.4	1.4	0.3	17.1

== Personal life ==
Vivians is a lesbian and, in 2022, got engaged to her partner, former professional basketball player Tierra Ruffin-Pratt.
