= Emily Engstler =

American basketball player (born 2000)

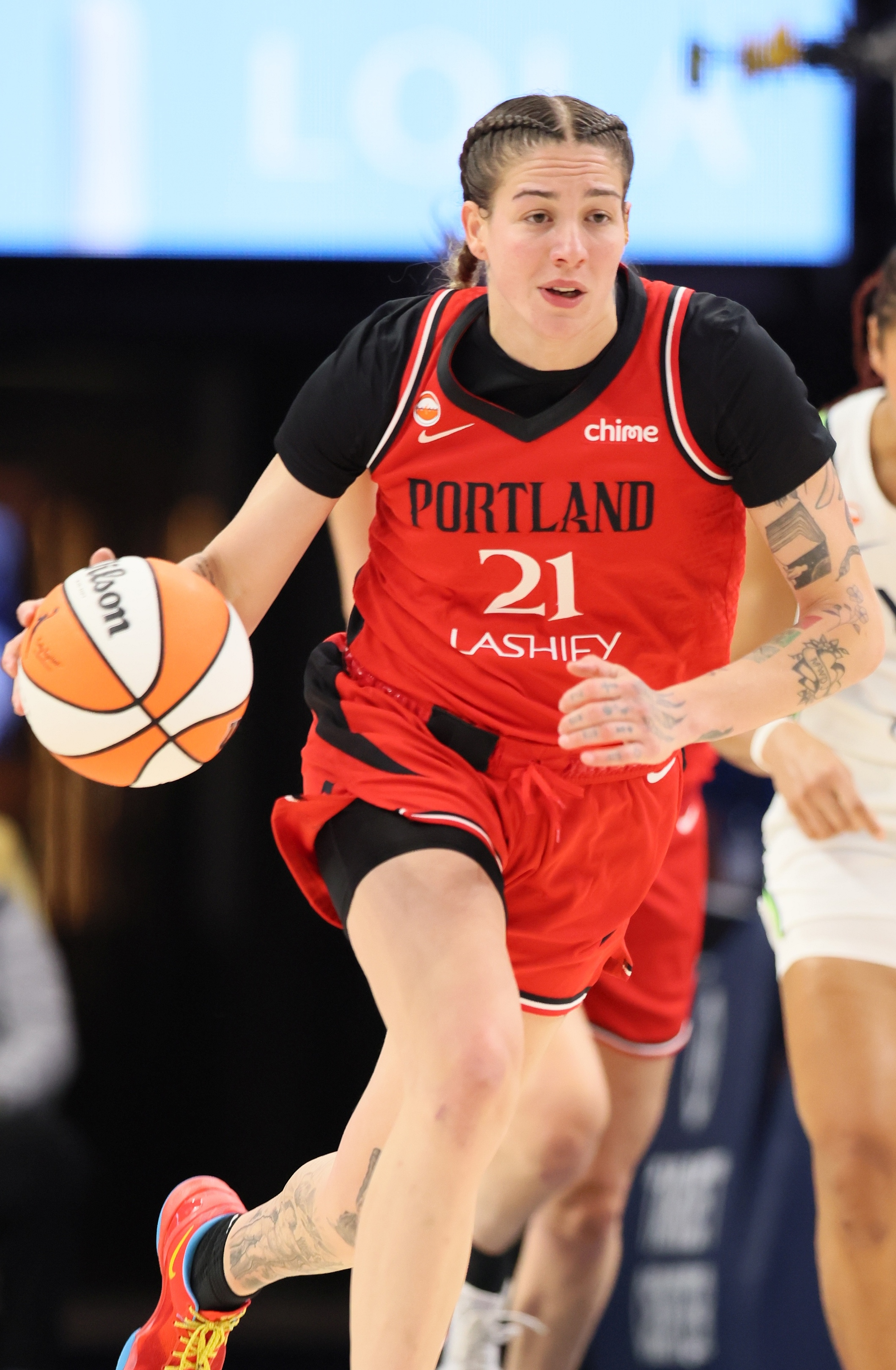
- Engstler with the Portland Fire in 2026

No. 21 – Portland Fire
- Position: Small forward / Power forward
- League: WNBA

Personal information
- Born: May 1, 2000 (age 26) Queens, New York, U.S.
- Listed height: 6 ft 1 in (1.85 m)
- Listed weight: 184 lb (83 kg)

Career information
- High school: Christ the King (Queens, New York); St. Francis Prep (Queens, New York)
- College: Syracuse (2018–2021); Louisville (2021–2022)
- WNBA draft: 2022: 1st round, 4th overall pick
- Drafted by: Indiana Fever
- Playing career: 2022–present

Career history
- 2022: Indiana Fever
- 2022: Flammes Carolo Basket
- 2023: Minnesota Lynx
- 2024–2025: Washington Mystics
- 2024–2025: Hapoel Lev Jerusalem
- 2026–present: Portland Fire

Career highlights
- First-team All-ACC (2022); ACC All-Defensive Team (2022); ACC Co-Sixth Player of the Year (2021); McDonald's All-American (2018)
- Stats at Basketball Reference
Medals
Women's 3x3 basketball
Representing the United States
FIBA 3x3 U23 World Cup
| Silver medal – second place | 2022 Romania | Team |

Emily Ann Engstler (born May 1, 2000) is an American professional basketball player for the Portland Fire of the Women's National Basketball Association (WNBA). She played college basketball for Syracuse during her first three years at the college level, then for Louisville, earning first-team All-ACC honors in her only season with the team. Engstler graduated from St. Francis Preparatory School in Queens, New York, where she was rated a five-star recruit by ESPN and named a McDonald's All-American. Selected fourth overall by the Indiana Fever in the 2022 WNBA draft, she has previously played for the Fever, the Minnesota Lynx, and the Washington Mystics.

== Early life ==
Engstler was born on May 1, 2000, in Queens, New York, to Marilyn and William Engstler, and moved to Roosevelt Island by the age of eight. She first picked up a basketball as a three-year-old and grew up playing for boys' Catholic Youth Organization teams at Resurrection Ascension Catholic Academy. Engstler also played pick-up games on outdoor courts across the street from her home. She modeled her game after Elena Delle Donne and Kevin Durant. In her freshman season, Engstler played for Christ the King Regional High School in Queens, where her mother had played basketball. After one year, she transferred to St. Francis Preparatory School in Queens, seeking a better academic fit, and sat out for her sophomore year due to Catholic High School Athletic Association (CHSAA) transfer rules.

As a junior, Engstler averaged 19 points, 15.7 rebounds, 5.9 blocks and 3.4 steals per game. She recorded the first quadruple-double in school history, with 27 points, 29 rebounds, 11 assists and 10 blocks, against Nazareth Regional High School. Engstler was named to the New York State Sportswriters Association (NYSSWA) Class AA all-state sixth team. In her senior season, she averaged 18.3 points, 11.5 rebounds, 3.7 assists, 3.3 steals and 2.1 blocks per game, receiving New York Gatorade Player of the Year and NYSSWA Class AA all-state first team accolades. She helped her team achieve a 19–9 record and reach the Brooklyn/Queens CHSAA title game. Engstler was selected to play in the McDonald's All-American Game and the Jordan Brand Classic.

Engstler was considered a five-star recruit and the ninth-best player in the 2018 class by ESPN. On October 19, 2017, she committed to play college basketball for Syracuse over offers from Ohio State and Miami (Florida). Engstler was drawn to the school because of its proximity to her home and its reputed program in broadcast journalism, her intended major.

== College career ==
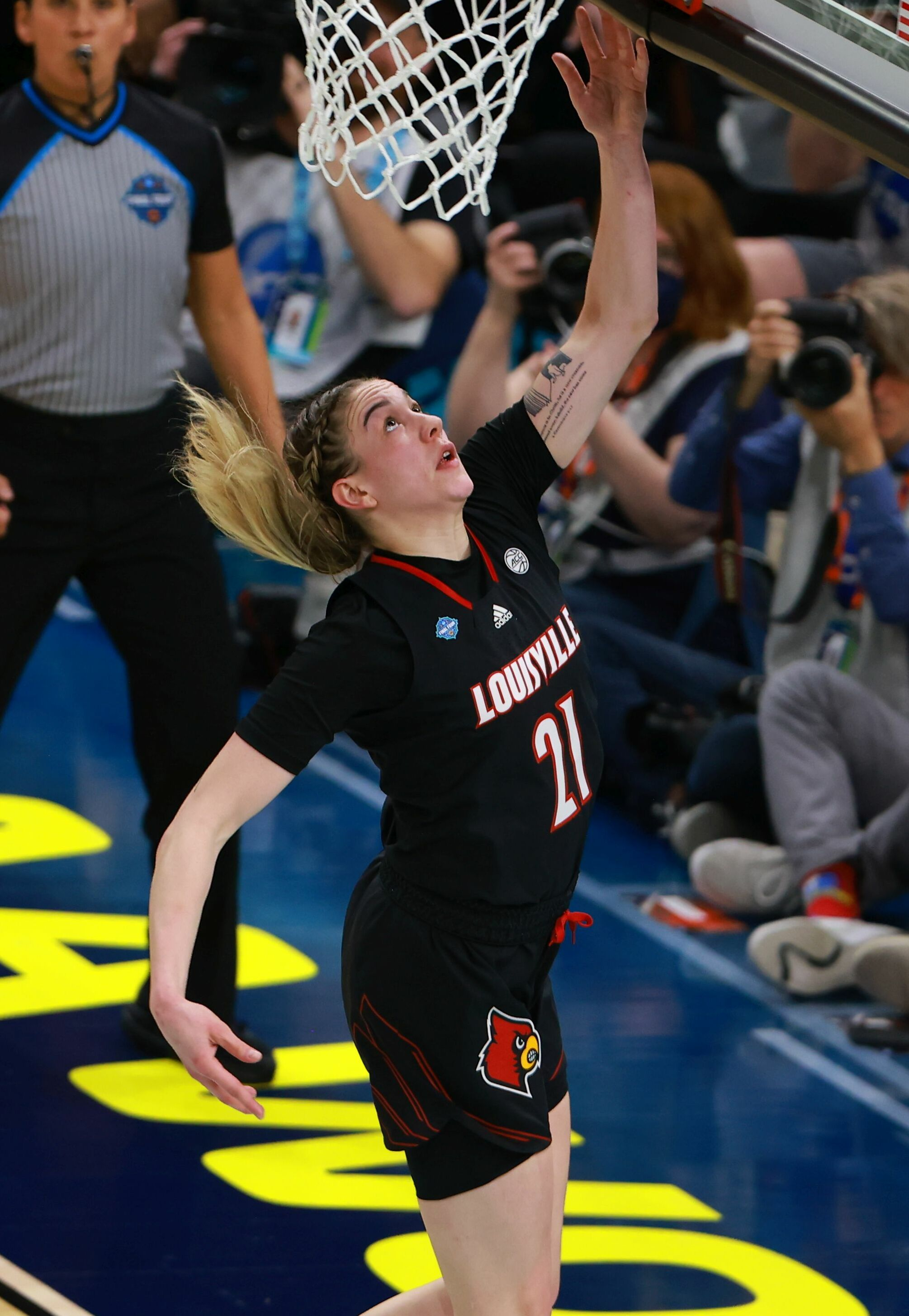
Engstler with Louisville in 2022

Engstler came off the bench during her freshman season at Syracuse. On February 21, 2019, she recorded a season-high 17 points, six rebounds, three assists and three blocks in a 90–63 win over Pittsburgh. As a freshman, Engstler averaged 4.9 points and 4.5 rebounds in 14.2 minutes per game. With the departure of small forward Miranda Drummond, she entered the starting lineup in her sophomore season. On December 20, 2019, Engstler posted 13 points, a season-high 17 rebounds and five assists in a 77–63 victory over Michigan State. On January 5, 2020, she recorded a season-high 22 points and 15 rebounds in a 74–63 victory against Notre Dame. As a sophomore, Engstler averaged nine points, 9.2 rebounds and 1.6 blocks per game, leading her team in rebounds and blocks. She suffered from depression during the season. Engstler improved her endurance and mental health by exercising routinely during COVID-19 pandemic lockdown under the guidance of her older sister, Danielle. She lost about 40 lbs (18 kg) in the offseason through exercise and dieting.

Engstler returned to a reserve role in her junior season, but remained one of Syracuse's most productive players. In the quarterfinals of the 2021 ACC tournament, she made a game-winning, buzzer beating layup in a 90–89 win over Florida State. Engstler registered a career-high 21 points and 10 rebounds in a 72–59 loss to Louisville at the semifinals. She was selected to the all-tournament second team. As a junior, Engstler averaged 10.5 points and 9.1 rebounds per game, earning ACC Co-Sixth Player of the Year honors. She led Syracuse in rebounds, steals and three-point field goal percentage.

For her senior season, Engstler transferred to Louisville, being drawn to the program by head coach Jeff Walz. On January 2, 2022, she made a game-winning layup with three seconds left in a 50–48 victory over Georgia Tech. On March 26, Engstler matched her season-high of 20 points while grabbing 10 rebounds in a 76–64 win against Tennessee at the Sweet 16 of the NCAA tournament. She helped Louisville reach the Final Four of the tournament. As a senior, Engstler averaged 11.9 points, 9.4 rebounds, 2.7 steals and 1.8 blocks per game, and was named to the first-team All-Atlantic Coast Conference and All-Defensive Team. On March 29, she declared for the 2022 WNBA draft, forgoing her additional year of college eligibility granted due to the COVID-19 pandemic.

== Professional career ==
=== WNBA ===
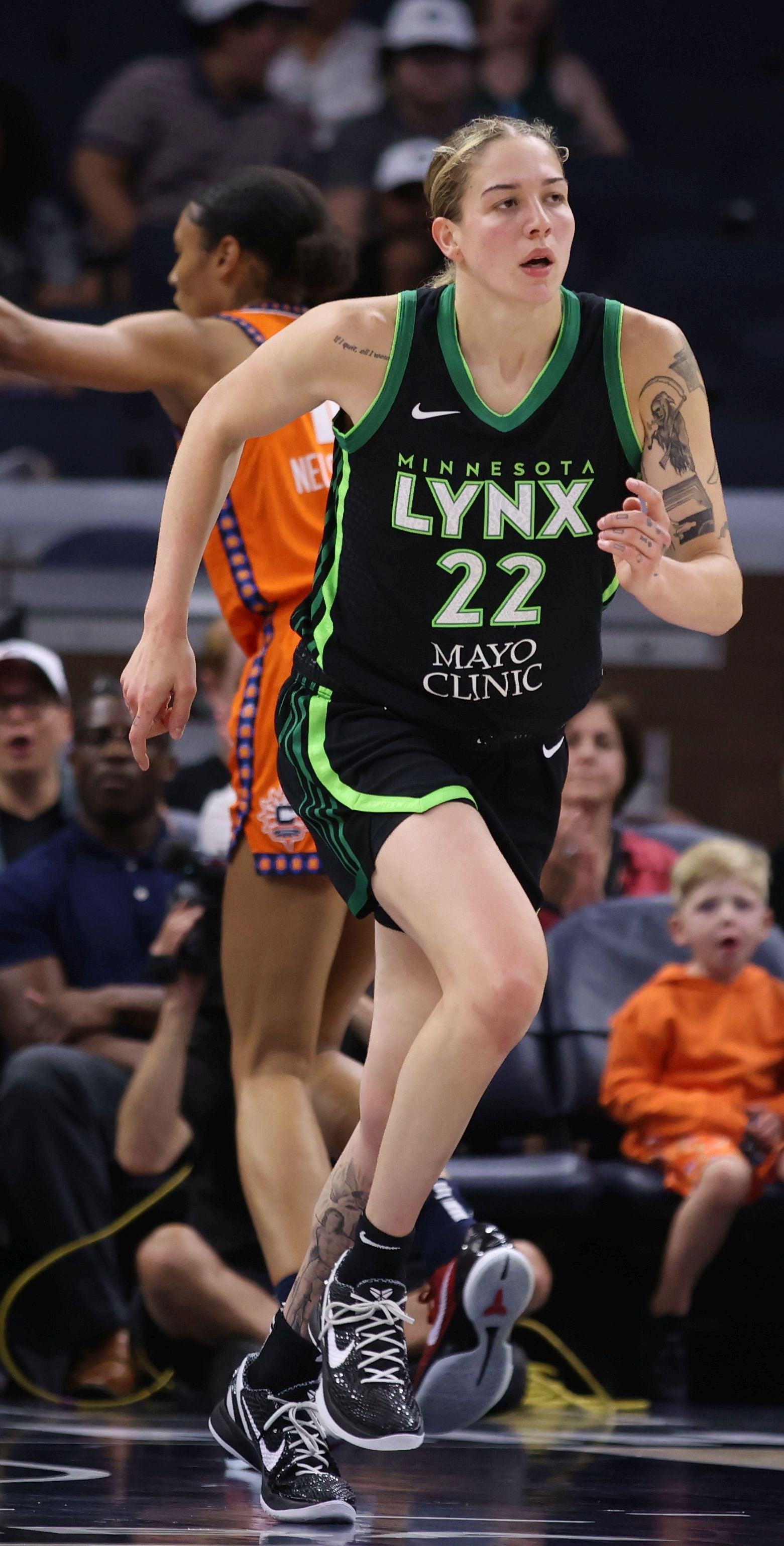
Engstler with the Minnesota Lynx in 2023

Engstler was selected by the Indiana Fever with the fourth overall pick in the 2022 WNBA draft. On August 12, 2022, she scored a season-high 18 points, five rebounds and three blocks in an 82–70 loss to the Washington Mystics. In her rookie season, Engstler averaged 5.2 points and 5.2 rebounds per game, making six starts in 35 games.

Prior to the start of the 2023 WNBA Training Camp, the Fever waived Engstler. After being waived by the Fever, Engstler signed a training camp contract with the Washington Mystics. Engstler did not make the final roster for the Mystics after appearing in the preseason. On June 14, 2023, Engstler signed a Hardship Contract with the Minnesota Lynx. Engstler spent just over a month with the Lynx before Jessica Shepard returned from her illness and Engstler was released from her hardship contract.

On February 1, 2024, going into her third year in the league, Engstler once again signed a training contract with the Washington Mystics. Engstler made the final roster and averaged 6.2 points, 4 rebounds, 1.5 assist, 0.6 steals per game, and a career high 47.4 3PT%, making 3 starts in 32 games. On June 22, 2024, she recorded a career high 23 points with 9 rebounds, 3 assists, 2 steals, and shot 75% from three against the Dallas Wings.

On April 3, 2026, she was drafted seventh overall by the Portland Fire in the 2026 WNBA expansion draft.

=== Overseas ===
After the 2022 WNBA season, she played for Flammes Carolo Basket of the Ligue Féminine de Basketball in France.

On June 26, 2024, Engstler signed with Israeli team, Hapoel Lev Jerusalem. She played 24 games from October 2024 through April 2025 averaging 34.9 minutes played, 19.4 points, 13.1 rebounds, 4.4 assists, 2.4 steals, 2.9 turnovers, and 2 blocks per game.

=== Athletes Unlimited ===
In January 2024, Engstler joined Athletes Unlimited Pro Basketball for its third season. She quickly became a roster favorite, and averaged 8.9 points, 10.2 rebounds, 2.7 assists, 2.1 steals, 2.3 blocks and started all 12 games she played. In March 2024, she was named the 2024 AU Pro Basketball Defensive Player of the Year.

== National team career ==
In August 2021, Engstler played for the United States national 3x3 team at the FIBA 3x3 Under-23 Nations League in France. She helped the team finish with a 5–3 record. Engstler won a silver medal at the 2022 FIBA 3x3 U23 World Cup in Romania. In November 2024, Engstler participated in the 2024 USA 3x3 Basketball Developmental Camp alongside other athletes to be considered for future national team assignments.

== Career statistics ==
Legend
| GP | Games played | GS | Games started | MPG | Minutes per game | RPG | Rebounds per game |
| APG | Assists per game | SPG | Steals per game | BPG | Blocks per game | PPG | Points per game |
| TO | Turnovers per game | FG% | Field-goal percentage | 3P% | 3-point field-goal percentage | FT% | Free-throw percentage |
| **Bold** | Career best | ° | League leader |

=== WNBA ===
==== Regular season ====
Stats current through end of 2025 season

WNBA regular season statistics
| Year | Team | GP | GS | MPG | FG% | 3P% | FT% | RPG | APG | SPG | BPG | TO | PPG |
|---|---|---|---|---|---|---|---|---|---|---|---|---|---|
| 2022 | Indiana | 35 | **6** | **18.2** | .396 | .356 | .553 | **5.2** | **1.5** | **0.7** | **1.1** | 1.4 | 5.2 |
| 2023 | Minnesota | 12 | 0 | 7.8 | .381 | .286 | .375 | 2.4 | 0.6 | 0.4 | 0.1 | 0.8 | 1.8 |
| 2024 | Washington | 32 | 3 | 14.5 | **.490** | **.474**° | **.818** | 4.0 | **1.5** | 0.6 | 0.8 | **0.7** | **6.2** |
| 2025 | Washington | **40** | 0 | 12.8 | .396 | .254 | .667 | 3.3 | **1.5** | **0.7** | 0.7 | 1.0 | 3.7 |
| **Career** | 4 years, 3 teams | 119 | 9 | 14.3 | .426 | .355 | .635 | 3.9 | 1.4 | 0.7 | 0.8 | 1.0 | 4.6 |

=== College ===
NCAA statistics
| Year | Team | GP | GS | MPG | FG% | 3P% | FT% | RPG | APG | SPG | BPG | TO | PPG |
|---|---|---|---|---|---|---|---|---|---|---|---|---|---|
| 2018–19 | Syracuse | 29 | 0 | 14.3 | 41.3 | 25.4 | 62.5 | 4.5 | 1.4 | 0.9 | 1.2 | 2.1 | 4.9 |
| 2019–20 | Syracuse | 31 | 31 | 29.3 | 37.3 | 33.3 | **69.2** | 9.2 | **2.8** | 1.1 | 1.6 | 2.9 | 9.0 |
| 2020–21 | Syracuse | 22 | 5 | **29.9** | 41.7 | 37.1 | 53.1 | 9.1 | 1.9 | 1.8 | 1.6 | **2.0** | 10.5 |
| 2021–22 | Louisville | **34** | **34** | 26.3 | **46.1** | **37.2** | 62.9 | **9.4** | 2.3 | **2.7** | **1.8** | 2.6 | **11.9** |
| **Career** | | 116 | 70 | 24.8 | 41.9 | 33.7 | 61.7 | 8.1 | 2.1 | 1.7 | 1.6 | 2.5 | 9.1 |
