= Chelsey Perry =

American basketball player (born 1999)

Rockhampton Cyclones
- Position: Forward
- League: NBL1 North

Personal information
- Born: June 7, 1999 (age 26) Middleton, Tennessee, U.S.
- Listed height: 6 ft 2 in (1.88 m)
- Listed weight: 164 lb (74 kg)

Career information
- High school: Middleton (Middleton, Tennessee)
- College: UT Martin (2017–2021)
- WNBA draft: 2021: 3rd round, 26th overall pick
- Drafted by: Indiana Fever
- Playing career: 2021–present

Career history
- 2021: Indiana Fever
- 2022–2023: Magnolia Basket Campobasso
- 2025–present: Rockhampton Cyclones

Career highlights
- 2× OVC Player of the Year (2020, 2021); 2× First-team All-OVC (2020, 2021); Second-team All-OVC (2019); OVC All-Freshman Team (2018)
- Stats at Basketball Reference

Chelsey Perry (born June 7, 1999) is an American basketball player for the Rockhampton Cyclones of the NBL1 North. She played college basketball for the UT Martin Skyhawks.

== Early life ==
Perry attended Middleton High School in Middleton, Tennessee. Perry was named a TSWA Class A All-State Honoree twice. During her senior year, she averaged 13.0 ppg, 12.0 rpg, 4.7 bpg, 2.3 spg, and 1.8 apg. She was named Most Valuable player during her sophomore season, as the Lady Tigers went 35–0 on their way to a State Championship. She was also a part of a Lady Tiger team that won 67 straight games.

== College career ==
Following her high school career, Perry continued to play basketball at UT-Martin.

=== Freshman ===
During her freshman season, Perry made an instant impact on the Skyhawks team. She was named an OVC All-Newcomer after averaging 11.2 points, 4.7 rebounds, 1.3 steals and 1.1 blocks. She won the Freshman of the Week Award three different times during the year.

=== Sophomore ===
Prior to her sophomore year, Perry was tabbed to the Preseason All-OVC team due to her previous season. She continued to make an impact for the Skyhawks averaging 12.0 points, 5.5 rebounds, 1.3 assists, 1.2 steals, and 2.2 blocks. With all of this, Perry was named to the All-OVC 2nd Team.

=== Junior ===
Perry made a huge jump in production in her junior year and she put herself on the map even more. She averaged 23.1 points, 7.0 rebounds, 2.7 blocks, 2.0 assists, and 1.6 steals. She joined the 1,000 point club during the year when they played Austin Peay. She also made a splash nationally – ranking 1st in the NCAA in field goals made, 2nd in total points, and 3rd in points per game and field goal attempts. Due to all her success, Perry was named to the WBCA Coaches' All-American Honorable Mention Team. She was also named UT Martin Bettye Giles Female Athlete of the Year, TSWA Women's Basketball Player of the Year, and a finalist for the Becky Hammon Mid-Major Player of the Year. She was also awarded the OVC Player of the Year, All-OVC 1st Team, and won a OVC record 8 Player of the Week Honors.

=== Senior ===
Perry made her final year another one to remember for the Skyhawks. She won the OVC Player of the Year again, named to the WNIT Memphis All-Tournament team, All-OVC 1st Team. She once again received recognition nationally when she was named a semifinalist for the Becky Hammon Mid-Major Player of the Year and also to the Katrina McClain Award Midseason Top 10 List. She averaged 22.9 points, 7.2 rebounds, 1.8 assists, 1.7 blocks, and 1.1 steals in her final year.

She finished her career as the Skyhawks All-Time leader in career blocks (228) and 3rd in career points (1,963).

=== UT Martin statistics ===
Ratios
Year	Team	GP	FG%	3P%	FT%	RBG	APG	BPG	SPG	PPG
2017–18	UT Martin	34	42.2%	32.0%	86.7%	5.71	1.21	1.12	1.27	11.21
2018–19	UT Martin	32	44.9%	34.8%	78.2%	5.53	1.34	2.22	1.16	12.00
2019–20	UT Martin	32	50.2%	38.5%	85.8%	7.94	2.00	2.69	1.63	23.13
2020–21	UT Martin	20	50.2%	42.2%	83.3%	7.15	1.80	1.65	1.10	22.90
Career		118	47.4%	37.5%	84.0%	6.51	1.56	1.93	1.31	16.64

Totals
Year	Team	GP	FG	FGA	3P	3PA	FT	FTA	REB	A	BK	ST	PTS
2017–18	UT Martin	34	137	325	16	50	91	105	194	41	38	43	381
2018–19	UT Martin	32	146	325	31	89	61	78	177	43	71	37	384
2019–20	UT Martin	32	286	570	47	122	121	141	254	64	86	52	740
2020–21	UT Martin	20	164	327	35	83	95	114	143	36	33	22	458
Career		118	733	1547	129	344	368	438	768	184	228	154	1963

== Professional career ==
Perry was selected with the 26th pick in the third round of the 2021 WNBA draft by the Indiana Fever, becoming the first player in UT Martin history to be taken in the WNBA draft while ranking as the highest selection in OVC history. She played in the first two games of the regular season but was then released on May 17. She was later signed back to the team on June 28, but missed the last 12 games of the season due a torn right ACL. In six regular season games played, Perry averaged 2.2 points and 1.0 rebounds in 6.7 minutes per contest.

In January 2022, Perry re-joined the Indiana Fever. In April 2022, Perry informed the team she would not play in the 2022 WNBA season due to personal reasons. She was subsequently placed on the team's suspended list and was not eligible to play in 2022.

For the 2022–23 season, Perry joined Magnolia Basket Campobasso of the Italian Serie A1. She left the team in January 2023 after averaging 9.1 points, 4.9 rebounds and 1.1 assists in 17 games.

In February 2023, Perry signed a training camp contract the Indiana Fever. She was released prior to the start of the 2023 WNBA season.

In April 2025, Perry signed with the Rockhampton Cyclones of the NBL1 North in Australia for the 2025 season.

== WNBA career statistics ==
Legend
GP	Games played	GS	Games started	MPG	Minutes per game	RPG	Rebounds per game
APG	Assists per game	SPG	Steals per game	BPG	Blocks per game	PPG	Points per game
TO	Turnovers per game	FG%	Field-goal percentage	3P%	3-point field-goal percentage	FT%	Free-throw percentage
**Bold**	Career best	°	League leader

=== Regular season ===
Year	Team	GP	GS	MPG	FG%	3P%	FT%	RPG	APG	SPG	BPG	TO	PPG
2021	Indiana	6	0	6.7	.278	.222	.500	1.0	0.3	0.5	0.0	0.3	2.2
Career	1 year, 1 team	6	0	6.7	.278	.222	.500	1.0	0.3	0.5	0.0	0.3	2.2
