= Bria Hartley =

French-American basketball player (born 1992)

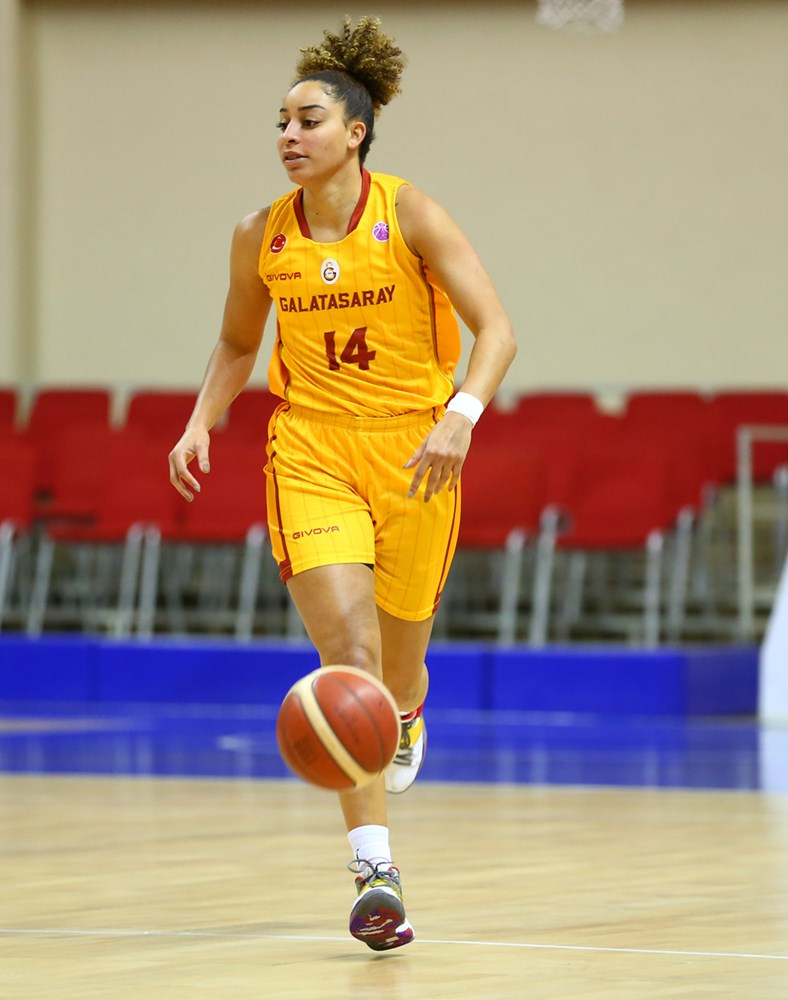
- Galatasaray in 2019

No. 14 – Free Agent
- Position: Shooting guard
- League: WNBA

Personal information
- Born: September 30, 1992 (age 34) North Babylon, New York, U.S.
- Listed height: 5 ft 9 in (1.75 m)
- Listed weight: 163 lb (74 kg)

Career information
- High school: North Babylon (North Babylon, New York)
- College: UConn (2010–2014)
- WNBA draft: 2014: 1st round, 7th overall pick
- Drafted by: Seattle Storm
- Playing career: 2014–2026

Career history
- 2014–2016: Washington Mystics
- 2014–2015: Uniqa Sopron
- 2015–2016: Mersin Büyükşehir Belediyespor
- 2017–2019: New York Liberty
- 2017–2018: Mersin Büyükşehir Belediyespor
- 2018–2019: Fenerbahçe
- 2019–2020: Galatasaray
- 2020–2021: Phoenix Mercury
- 2022–2023: Fenerbahçe
- 2022: Indiana Fever
- 2022: Connecticut Sun
- 2023: CB Avenida
- 2023–2024: Galatasaray
- 2025: Connecticut Sun

Career highlights
- WNBA All-Rookie Team (2014); 2× NCAA champion (2013, 2014); Turkish Cup winner (2019); 2× Turkish Super League champion (2019, 2022); Second-team All-American – AP (2014); All-American – USBWA (2014); 2× WBCA Coaches' All-American (2012, 2014); First-team All-AAC (2014); First-team All-Big East (2012); Big East Freshman of the Year (2011); Big East All-Freshman Team (2011); McDonald's All-American (2010); Parade All-American (2010); Miss New York Basketball (2010)
- Stats at WNBA.com
- Stats at Basketball Reference
Medals
Women's basketball
Representing United States
World University Games
Gold medal – first place	2013 Kazan	Team
FIBA Under-19 World Cup
Gold medal – first place	2011 Chile	Team
FIBA Under-18 Americas Championship
Gold medal – first place	2010 United States	Team
Basketball 3x3
FIBA 3x3 World Cup
Gold medal – first place	2012 Greece	Team
Representing France
EuroBasket
Silver medal – second place	2019 Serbia/Latvia

Bria Nicole Hartley (born September 30, 1992) is a French-American professional basketball player for the Connecticut Sun of the WNBA and Galatasaray of the Turkish Super League. She was drafted seventh overall by the Seattle Storm in the 2014 WNBA draft and was immediately traded to the Washington Mystics. Hartley played shooting guard for the UConn women's basketball team, and won back to back national championships in 2013 and 2014.

== Early life ==
Hartley is the daughter of Dennis and Simone Hartley. She started playing basketball at a very young age, and honed her game in her driveway, playing against two older brothers. They pushed her around, but she credits that for making her tougher.

== High school career ==
Hartley attended North Babylon High School in North Babylon, New York. Hartley began playing with North Babylon's varsity squad as an eighth grader. During her junior year, she averaged 21 points, 7.4 rebounds, 7.2 assists, 6.0 steals and 4.7 blocks per game and was named to the Parade All-America list. Hartley was also recognized as New York Gatorade Player of the Year for athletic excellence, academic achievement and exemplary character. As a senior, she had five triple doubles, and averaged 30 points, 8.3 rebounds 7.4 assists, 5.9 steals and 5.0 blocks per game. She led her team to the state championship, where she poured in 51 points, but it wasn't enough to overcome a balanced attack by Sachem East. She was named New York Gatorade Player of the Year and New York Miss Basketball. Hartley finished as North Babylon's all-time leader in points (1,978).

Hartley was selected to play at the McDonald's All-American Game, she scored 17 points and WBCA High School All-America Game, where she scored 19 points. In addition to basketball, she also participated in soccer and lacrosse. She earned a Suffolk County Legislature proclamation for high academic achievement, community service and excellence in basketball. Before her final season began at North Babylon High School, Hartley committed to the University of Connecticut.

== College career ==
=== Freshman year ===
Freshmen rarely start at UConn, but Caroline Doty, expected to be a starting guard for the team, suffered an ACL injury in August 2010 which kept her out of the lineup for the entire season. With limited options, Hartley started and played a total of 1,209 minutes, the most ever by a UConn freshman. She averaged 12.4 points per game and was named the Big East Freshman of the Year, and Big East all tournament team.

=== Sophomore year ===
Hartley improved her statistics from her freshman season. During her sophomore season, she averaged 14.0 points per game and 3.7 assists per game. Throughout the season, she shot 46.5% from the field, 33% from three-point range, and 75.6% from the free throw line. She was named first-team All-Big East, and she was named to the BIG EAST All-Tournament after she scored 18 points against Notre Dame in the BIG EAST Final. Hartley earned her spot on the Huskies wall of fame by being one of 10 candidates named to the WBCA/State Farm All American team.

=== Junior year ===
Hartley finished her junior season averaging 9.2 points and 4.5 assists per game. After a stellar sophomore season, Hartley had a dip in production. She had career lows in minutes played, points, rebounds, field goal percentage, 3-point percentage and free throw percentage. Her statistical drops are in part credited to a case of ankle injury that Hartley was fighting all year long. She came back strong in the NCAA tournament, helping her team win the National Championship. Hartley was named to the NCAA Final Four All-Tournament team.

=== Senior year ===
In her final year at UConn, Hartley was named to the All-American Athletic first team after averaging 16.2 points, 4.3 assists, and 1.6 steals per game. Hartley was also a consensus second-team all-American as a senior, and started every game as the Huskies won their second straight national championship. Hartley led UConn to a 144–11 record over her four-year career, which included four Final Four appearances and back to back National Championships. One of only two Huskies, along with Maya Moore as the only players with 1,500 points, 500 rebounds, 500 assists, and 200 steals. She finished her career ranking eighth in points (1,994), sixth in three-point field goals made (557) and games played (153), and fifth in assists (559). Hartley inducted into the Huskies of Honor on senior night.

== Connecticut statistics ==
Legend
GP	Games played	GS	Games started	MPG	Minutes per game
FG%	Field goal percentage	3P%	3-point field goal percentage	FT%	Free throw percentage
RPG	Rebounds per game	APG	Assists per game	SPG	Steals per game
BPG	Blocks per game	PPG	Points per game	**Bold**	Career high

Year	Team	GP	Points	FG%	3P%	FT%	RPG	APG	SPG	BPG	PPG
2010-11	Connecticut	38	472	46.8	**39.2**	73.1	3.6	2.9	1.2	0.5	12.4
2011-12	Connecticut	38	533	46.5	33.2	75.6	**3.9**	3.7	**1.8**	**0.8**	14.0
2012-13	Connecticut	37	342	39.1	29.7	**78.5**	3.2	3.7	1.4	0.5	9.2
2013-14	Connecticut	**40**	**647**	**47.0**	36.6	69.1	3.6	**4.3**	1.7	**0.8**	**16.2**
Career	Connecticut	153	1994	45.3	35.0	73.5	3.6	3.6	1.5	0.7	13.0

== Professional career ==
=== WNBA ===
After being drafted seventh overall by the Seattle Storm in the 2014 WNBA draft, Hartley was immediately traded to the Washington Mystics who drafted UConn teammate Stefanie Dolson. Hartley started in her second game of the season as she had team high 15 points and dished out 5 assists vs Indiana Fever on May 23, 2014. On June 1, 2014, in the triple-overtime game vs the Los Angeles Sparks, the UConn duo of Hartley and Dolson combined for 34 points coming off the bench and Hartley scored her first 20-point game. On June 24, 2014, vs Seattle Storm Hartley scored career-high 26 points going 11–16 from the floor, including 4–6 from three-point range. She suffered a broken left middle finger in a game against the Seattle Storm in a loss. Hartley would make the WNBA All-Rookie Team and average 9.7 ppg in 34 games played with 29 starts. The Mystics finished 3rd place in the Eastern Conference with a 16–18 record but were eliminated by the Indiana Fever in a 2-game sweep of the first round.

In 2015, Hartley would sit out the first 6 games of the season due to a right foot stress fracture. She would eventually make her return and played 25 games with minimal playing time while on minutes restriction. The Mystics finished 4th place in the Eastern Conference with an 18–16 record, however they would once again get eliminated in the first round after losing in 3 games to the New York Liberty, Hartley was unable to keep playing for the rest of the series after Game 1.

In 2016, Hartley had slightly increased playing time from last season. After playing 24 games, it was announced that Hartley became pregnant with her first child and would sit out the rest of the season. The Mystics went on to finish 13–21, missing out on the playoffs.

In January 2017, Hartley was traded to her home state team, the New York Liberty in a three-team trade deal that sent teammate Kia Vaughn also to the Liberty, Carolyn Swords along with the 15th overall pick in the 2017 WNBA draft to the Seattle Storm and the Mystics receiving the Storm's first and second round draft picks in the 2017 WNBA draft. On May 13, 2017, Hartley made her Liberty debut and recorded 3 assists and 4 rebounds in 18 minutes of play in a 73–64 win over the San Antonio Stars. On June 16, 2017, Hartley scored a season-high 17 points in 102–93 win over the Dallas Wings. The Liberty would finish the season on a 10-game winning streak and the number 3 seed in the league, receiving a bye to the second round under the league's new playoff format which was put into effect last season. In the second round elimination game, the Liberty were defeated by the number 6 seeded Washington Mystics 81–69, Hartley scored 15 points in the loss.

In February 2018, Hartley re-signed with the Liberty. In 2018, the Liberty would have a disappointing season as they missed out on the playoffs with a 7–27 record.

In 2019, Hartley played 24 games with 18 starts and averaged a career-high in scoring, but the Liberty continued to struggle, they finished the season with a 10–24 record, missing out on the playoffs for the second year in a row.

In 2020, Hartley signed a three-year deal with the Phoenix Mercury in free agency. The 2020 season was delayed and shortened to 22 games in a bubble at IMG Academy due to the COVID-19 pandemic. Hartley would be a role player off the bench for the Mercury as well as an occasional starter. On August 3, 2020, Hartley scored a new career-high 27 points in a 96–67 victory over her former team the New York Liberty. She was averaging new career-highs in scoring, assists, steals and shooting percentages, but her season was unfortunately cut short after 13 games played. On August 28, 2020, Hartley suffered a torn ACL during a game against the Washington Mystics, she was ruled out for the rest of the season. The Mercury proceeded to finish as the number 5 seed with a 13–9 record, they would make it as far as the second round where they lost to the Minnesota Lynx in the elimination game.

Hartley was waived from the Indiana Fever on July 15, 2022.

On July 18, 2022, Hartley was signed by the Connecticut Sun.

=== Overseas ===
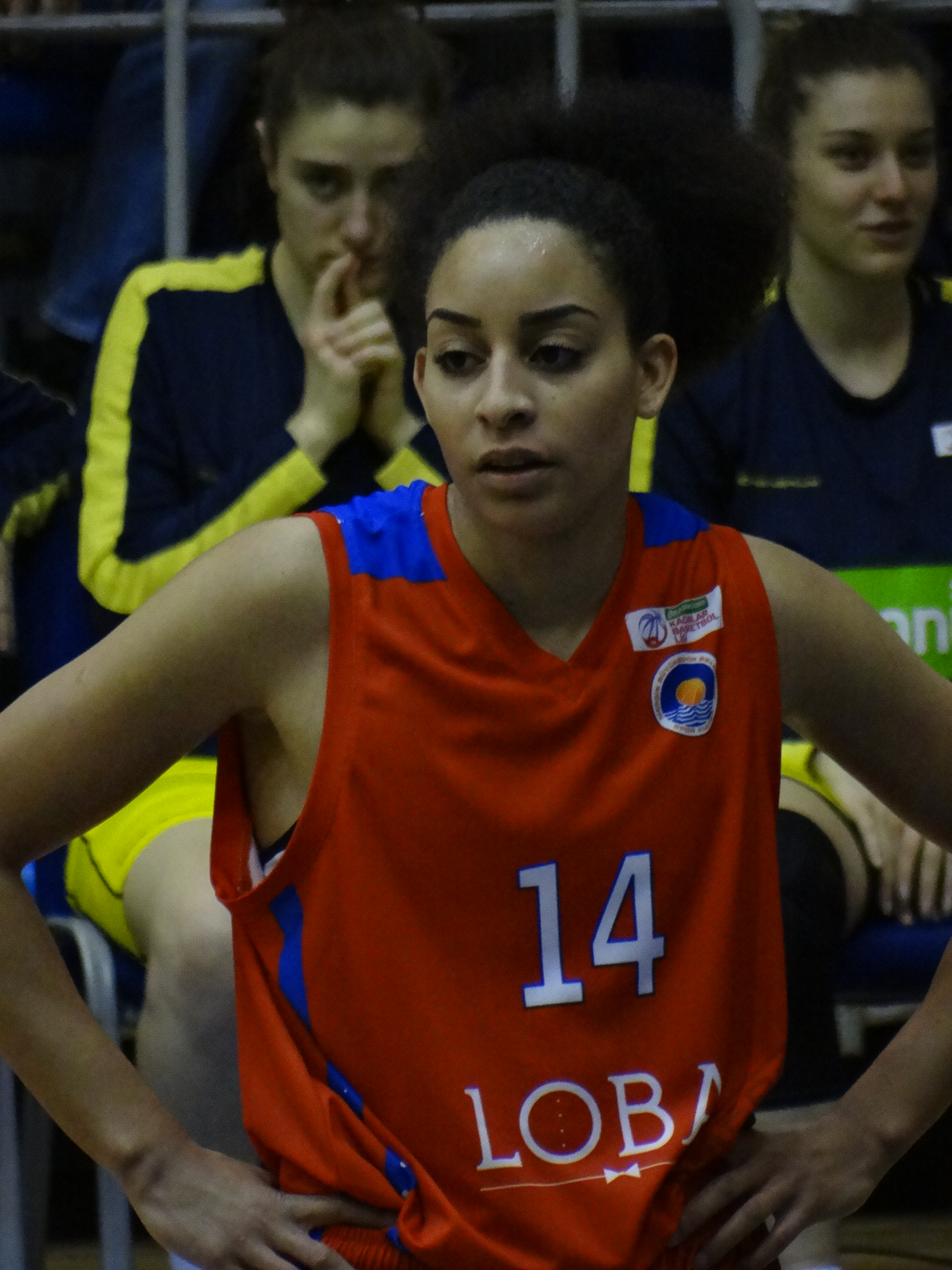
Hartley with Mersin Büyükşehir Belediyesi

==== Uniqa Sopron ====
In the 2014–15 off-season, Harley played in Hungary for Uniqa Sopron.

==== Mersin Büyükşehir Belediyespor ====
In the 2015–16 off-season, Harley played in Turkey for Mersin BBSK. In August 2017, Hartley once again joined Mersin BBSK for the 2017–18 off-season.

==== Fenerbahçe (2018–19) ====
In July 2018, Hartley signed a one-year deal with Fenerbahçe for the 2018–19 off-season.

==== Galatasaray (2019–20) ====
In August 2019, Harley signed a one-year deal with Galatasaray S.K. of the Turkish league for the 2019–20 off-season.

==== Galatasaray (2023–24) ====
On 21 December 2023, she signed with Galatasaray of the Turkish Women's Basketball Super League (TKBL).

== WNBA career statistics ==
Legend
GP	Games played	GS	Games started	MPG	Minutes per game	RPG	Rebounds per game
APG	Assists per game	SPG	Steals per game	BPG	Blocks per game	PPG	Points per game
TO	Turnovers per game	FG%	Field-goal percentage	3P%	3-point field-goal percentage	FT%	Free-throw percentage
**Bold**	Career best	°	League leader

=== Regular season ===
Year	Team	GP	GS	MPG	FG%	3P%	FT%	RPG	APG	SPG	BPG	TO	PPG
2014	Washington	34	29	**27.1**	.380	.327	.780	2.1	3.1	0.7	0.1	2.5	9.7
2015	Washington	25	0	12.3	.304	.239	.765	1.2	1.6	0.4	0.0	**0.8**	4.2
2016	Washington	24	5	16.9	.376	.363	.800	2.0	2.3	0.4	0.0	1.4	6.5
2017	New York	34	24	21.4	.416	.345	.744	2.1	2.1	0.5	**0.2**	1.4	7.8
2018	New York	34	20	23.7	.389	.308	.708	2.9	3.6	0.9	0.1	2.0	8.5
2019	New York	24	18	22.7	.376	.329	.803	**3.2**	3.2	0.8	0.0	2.1	9.8
2020	Phoenix	13	3	24.8	.420	.385	**.805**	2.9	**4.5**	**1.2**	0.0	2.1	**14.6**
2021	Phoenix	6	0	8.5	**.563**	**.571**	.000	0.7	0.8	0.2	0.0	**0.8**	3.7
2022	Indiana	10	0	8.7	.346	.333	.667	1.0	1.0	0.1	0.0	0.9	2.5
2022	Connecticut	3	0	12.0	.455	.500	.000	0.7	1.3	1.0	0.0	0.3	4.7
2025	Connecticut	**38**	**32**	22.8	.362	.367	.772	2	3.1	0.8	0.0	1.8	8.9
Career	10 years, 5 teams	245	131	20.7	.383	.341	.770	2.1	2.7	0.7	0.0	1.7	8.0

=== Playoffs ===
Year	Team	GP	GS	MPG	FG%	3P%	FT%	RPG	APG	SPG	BPG	TO	PPG
2014	Washington	2	**2**	20.5	.333	.000	.500	**3.0**	4.5	**1.0**	0.0	0.5	3.5
2015	Washington	1	0	6.0	.000	.000	.000	1.0	1.0	0.0	0.0	**0.0**	0.0
2017	New York	1	1	**29.5**	**.600**	**.400**	**1.000**	2.0	**5.0**	**1.0**	0.0	5.0	**15.0**
2021	Phoenix	**10**	0	9.6	.308	.273	**1.000**	1.4	1.3	0.1	0.0	0.7	2.5
Career	4 years, 3 teams	14	3	12.3	.362	.263	.889	1.6	2.0	0.3	0.0	0.9	3.4

== USA Basketball ==
Hartley was named to the USA Basketball U18 team. The USA team was one of eight teams from North, South and Central America, along with the Caribbean, invited to participate in the 2010 FIBA Americas U18 Championship.For Women, held at the U.S. Olympic Training Center, in Colorado Springs, Colorado. The top finishing team qualify for the 2011 FIBA U19 Women's World Championship. The team was coached by Jennifer Rizzotti, a former point guard for Connecticut, who helped teach Hartley how to "be a leader". Rizzotti noted her improvement over the course of the event, especially in decision-making.

=== USA U18 2010 ===
The opening exhibition match was against Canada, won by the USA team 58–39. Hartley had ten points, three assists and four steals. In the opening round game against Argentina, Hartley was a double digit scorer, helping the US to a 91–32 victory. In the next game against Brazil, Hartley played a role setting the opening tempo, as she scored eight points as part of a 13–2 early run. Hartley would end up with 14 points, second leading scorer in the victory over Brazil. The USA won the following game easily against Puerto Rico 108–44, then beat Chile in the semi-final match up 98–28. The gold medal game was a rematch against Brazil, which the USA won 81–38. Hartley was the second leading scorer for the team with 10.6 points per game.

=== U19 World Championships Chile ===
In 2011, Hartley was selected to be on the USA basketball U19 team at the U19 World Championship, held in Puerto Montt, Chile. The USA won their first five games, but then came up short, losing to Canada 64–52. They were still qualified for the medal round, and played France in the quarterfinal. The USA was down by as much as 13 points early in the game, but took a lead with just over a minute to go in the game and ended up with the win 70–64. The USA took an early lead in the semi-final against Brazil, and went on to win to qualify for the gold medal game. The final game was against Spain, which the USA won 69–46. Hartley was the second leading scorer on the team, averaging 11.1 points per game, just behind Breanna Stewart's 11.2 points per game. She led the team in steal with 17, to help the US to an 8–1 record and the gold medal in the Championship game.

=== 2013 World University Games - Russia ===
Hartley, along with teammate Kaleena Mosqueda-Lewis, were two of the twelve players selected to be on the team representing the US at the World University Games held in Kazan, Russia in July 2013. The team, coached by Sherri Coale, won the opening four games easily, scoring in triple digits in each game, and winning by 30 or more points in each case. After winning the quarterfinal game against Sweden, they faced Australia in the semifinal.

The USA team opened up as much as a 17 point lead in the fourth quarter of the game but the Australian team fought back and took a one-point lead in the final minute. Crystal Bradford scored a basket with 134 seconds left in the game to secure a 79–78 victory. The gold medal opponent was Russia, but the USA team never trailed, and won 90–71 to win the gold medal and the World University games Championship. Hartley was the leading scorer for the team, averaging 13.5 points per game. She had 20 assists and nine steals, both second only to Odyssey Sims.

== National team career ==
Hartley, who also holds French citizenship, made herself available for the France national team by directly contacting the French federation in 2018. According to her mother, she was already considering playing for France while playing for the Huskies in honor of her grandmother, a French native. She made her debut the same year, scoring 9 points in 19 minutes in a win against Romania. She also played in EuroBasket 2019, winning the silver medal, notably scoring the tying basket in the quarter-finals, allowing France to win in overtime against Belgium.

== Personal life ==
Hartley has a child with her boyfriend Shakim Phillips, who was a wide receiver for UConn's and Boston College's football teams. Their son was born in January 2017.

== Awards and honors ==
- 2009—Gatorade Player of the Year New York
- 2009—Parade All-American
- 2010—Gatorade Player of the Year New York
- 2010—USA Today's All-USA second team
- 2010—ESPN Rise All-America first team
- 2010—Women's Basketball Coaches Association All-America team
- 2010—New York Newsday's Long Island Player of the Year
- 2011—Big East Freshman of the Year
- 2011—Big East Tournament All Tournament team
- 2013—NCAA Final Four All-Tournament team.
- 2014—ESPNW Second Team All-American
- 2014—USBWA All-American team
- 2014—AP All-American Second Team
- 2019—Inducted into the Suffolk Sports Hall of Fame on Long Island in the Basketball Category
