= Khayla Pointer =

American basketball player (born 1998)

No. 22 – Jacksonville Waves
- Position: Guard
- League: UpShot League

Personal information
- Born: November 25, 1998 (age 27) Marietta, Georgia, U.S.
- Listed height: 5 ft 7 in (1.70 m)

Career information
- High school: Holy Innocents (Sandy Springs, Georgia)
- College: LSU (2017–2022)
- WNBA draft: 2022: 2nd round, 13th overall pick
- Drafted by: Las Vegas Aces
- Playing career: 2022–present

Career history
- 2022: Indiana Fever
- 2024: Casademont Zaragoza
- 2026–present: Jacksonville Waves

Career highlights
- Second-team All-American – AP (2022); Third-team All-American – USBWA (2022); 2x First-team All-SEC (2021, 2022); All-SEC Defensive Team (2021)
- Stats at Basketball Reference

Khayla Pointer (born November 25, 1998) is an American professional basketball player who currently plays for the Jacksonville Waves of the UpShot League, an American women's developmental league. She was drafted into the WNBA by the Las Vegas Aces and played for the Indiana Fever. She played college basketball at LSU from 2017 to 2022. She currently plays for Casademont Zaragoza in Spain.

== College career ==
Coming out of high school, Pointer was a 4-Star recruit and ranked the 70th overall recruit in ESPN HoopGurlz Ranking. Pointer was the 14th ranked player from Prospect Nation before she made a commitment to play for the LSU Tigers program. When she committed, her aunt Nikki Fargas was the head coach of the team.

During her freshman season, Pointer played in all 29 games for the Tigers, making 2 starts. She averaged 4.4 points, 1.4 rebounds, and 2.2 assists during the year. She scored a season-high in points on January 14, 2017, when LSU played Florida. Pointer scored 17 points on 6-11 shooting, while also grabbing 5 rebounds.

Pointer moved into the starting role during her sophomore season and made a big impact for the Tigers. She increased her minutes per game to 31.7 and her scoring jumped up from the 4.4 her freshman season to 12.5 a game. In her junior season, Pointer once again averaged over 30+ minutes a game and became the team's leading scorer at 14.8 points. She became one of the SEC's best guards as she was Top 10 in many statical categories. Pointer ranked 10th in scoring, 3rd in assists, 5th in steals, 7th in assist/turnover ratio, and 10th in free throw percentage. Pointer was rewarded for her top play and was named to the SEC All-Second Team in 2020.

On December 20, 2022, Pointer scored her 1,000th career point against Loyola Marymount as the Tigers won 54-52. Pointer again had a great statistical year for the Tigers averaging 16.9 points, 4.1 rebounds, 4.1 assists, and was named to the All- SEC 1st Team and the All-Defensive Team.

On April 9, 2021, it was announced that Pointer would return to LSU for her COVID-Extra year to play a 5th year for the Tigers. Later that month, LSU hired Kim Mulkey as their new head coach. Mulkey stated that “She (Pointer) is an all-conference player, and she is a leader out there on the floor,” Mulkey. “She’s learning. It’s a new system for her. She will be one of our leaders as will Faus (Fuastine Aifuwa) and (Jailin) Cherry,” at one of her preseason press conferences.

In her graduate season, Pointer was a finalist for the Nancy Lieberman Point Guard Award. She was named to the All-SEC 1st Team and made the AP and Sports Illustrated All-American 2nd Teams, as well as the USBWA All-American Third Team. She averaged a career best 19.6 points, 6.4 rebounds, and 5.3 assists.

== College statistics ==
Year	Team	GP	Points	FG%	3P%	FT%	RPG	APG	SPG	BPG	PPG
2017–18	LSU	29	129	.324	.308	.719	1.4	2.3	0.9	0.1	4.4
2018–19	LSU	29	362	.436	.333	.628	4.0	4.5	1.7	0.1	12.5
2019–20	LSU	30	443	.414	.286	.725	4.0	4.7	2.1	0.1	14.8
2020–21	LSU	22	372	.394	.333	.605	4.1	4.1	2.5	0.0	16.9
2021–22	LSU	32	628	.419	.362	.656	6.4	5.3	1.8	0.2	19.6
Career		142	1934	.408	.331	.658	4.0	4.2	1.8	0.1	13.6

== Professional career ==
Pointer was selected by the Las Vegas Aces in the 2nd round of the 2022 WNBA draft with the 13th overall pick. Pointer was waived on May 2, 2022, and did not make the Aces' roster.

=== Indiana Fever ===
On June 14, 2022, Pointer was signed by the Indiana Fever. Pointer appeared in 10 games for the Fever during the 2022 season. During April 2023, Pointer was waived by the Fever prior to the start of training camp.

=== Casademont Zaragoza ===
On February 11, 2024, Pointer signs for Casademont Zaragoza in the Spanish women's league.

=== Jacksonville Waves ===
In 2026, Pointer signed with the UpShot League, an American women's professional women's basketball league. She plays for the Jacksonville Waves.

== WNBA career statistics ==
Legend
GP	Games played	GS	Games started	MPG	Minutes per game	RPG	Rebounds per game
APG	Assists per game	SPG	Steals per game	BPG	Blocks per game	PPG	Points per game
TO	Turnovers per game	FG%	Field-goal percentage	3P%	3-point field-goal percentage	FT%	Free-throw percentage
**Bold**	Career best	°	League leader

=== Regular season ===
Year	Team	GP	GS	MPG	FG%	3P%	FT%	RPG	APG	SPG	BPG	TO	PPG
2022	Indiana	10	0	5.8	.583	.250	.500	0.8	0.2	0.2	0.0	0.9	2.2
Career	1 year, 1 team	10	0	5.8	.583	.250	.500	0.8	0.2	0.2	0.0	0.9	2.2
