= Ali Patberg =

American basketball player

Personal information
- Born: September 11, 1996 (age 30) Columbus, Indiana
- Listed height: 5 ft 11 in (1.80 m)

Career information
- High school: Columbus North (Columbus, Indiana)
- College: Notre Dame (2016–2017); Indiana (2018–2022)
- WNBA draft: 2022: 3rd round, 34th overall pick
- Drafted by: Indiana Fever
- Position: Guard

Career highlights
- First-team All-Big Ten (2020); MaxPreps National Player of the Year (2015); McDonald's All-American (2015); Indiana Miss Basketball (2015)
- Stats at Basketball Reference
Medals
Women's basketball
Representing the United States
FIBA Under-19 World Cup
Gold medal – first place	2015 Russia	Team

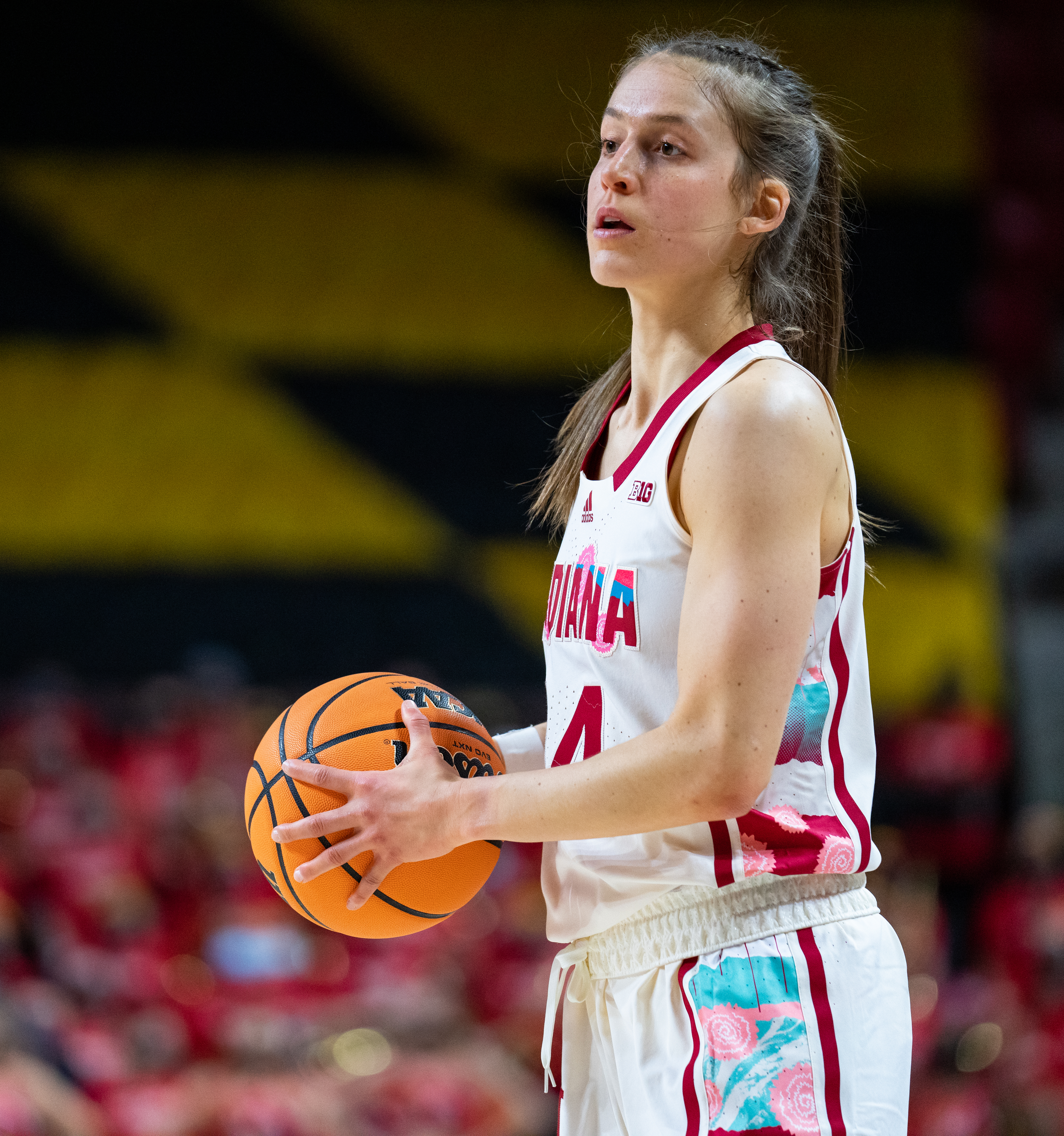
Ali Patberg in 2022

Ali Patberg (born September 11, 1996) is an assistant coach and former player for the Indiana Hoosiers women's basketball team. For her basketball experience, Patberg and Columbus North High School won the IHSAA state event in 2015 for 4A teams. That year, her teams won the McDonald's All-American Game and the Jordan Brand Classic. She was also part of the American team that won the 2015 FIBA Under-19 World Championship for Women. Upon leaving Columbus North that year, she set multiple career records for the school while accumulating 2026 points.

On the Notre Dame Fighting Irish women's basketball team, Patberg won the 2017 ACC women's basketball tournament and competed at the 2017 NCAA Division I women's basketball tournament. Following her move to Indiana University, Patberg held season records in points and assists from 2019 to 2020. Her team reached the Elite Eight at the 2021 NCAA Division I women's basketball tournament and was the runner-up at the 2022 Big Ten women's basketball tournament. After accumulating 528 assists and 1752 points, Patberg was in the top five for most assists and top ten for most points when she left Indiana in 2022. Patberg was selected by the Indiana Fever during the 2022 WNBA draft before she was cut from the team.

== Early life and education ==
Patberg's birth occurred in Columbus, Indiana on September 11, 1996. As a toddler, she practiced alongside her father's boys basketball team. She continued to play basketball during her childhood after her parents had a divorce. During high school, she played basketball with her sibling at Columbus North High School. For her post-secondary education, Patberg studied business at Indiana University.

== Career ==
=== High school and FIBA ===
While playing basketball at Columbus North, Patberg and her team were second at the 2012 IHSAA state tournament for 4A teams. In 2015, Patberg and Columbus North won the 4A division of the IHSAA state event. That year, she had career records for Columbus North with 2026 points, 534 assists and 273 steals. During the early 2020s, Patberg was in the top 25 for most points scored in a season by an IHSAA girls basketball player with 751 points.

For her traveling team experience, Patberg had a stress fracture while part of the Indiana Elite in July 2013. With her foot injury, Patberg did play basketball until October 2013. The following year, she left her dad's team to join the Gym Rats. In 2015, Patberg's teams won the McDonald's All-American Game and the Jordan Brand Classic.

Patberg was one of the candidates for the American team that went to the 2014 FIBA Americas Under-18 Championship for Women. After she did not make the 2014 team, Patberg became an alternate for the United States team scheduled for the 2015 FIBA Under-19 World Championship for Women. When Asia Durr withdrew a month before the event due to injury, Patberg was chosen to fill in for Durr. While making 32 rebounds in seven games, Patberg and her team won the 2015 FIBA event.

=== College basketball and WNBA ===
While with the Notre Dame Fighting Irish women's basketball team, Patberg had an ACL injury in November 2015. By August 2016, Patberg had multiple surgeries to her knee. She also underwent rehabilitation for her knee that year. Patberg resumed playing with Notre Dame in November 2016.

The following year, Patberg and Notre Dame won the 2017 ACC women's basketball tournament. She competed with the team during the first round of the 2017 NCAA Division I women's basketball tournament. After Notre Dame reached the regional final, Patberg decided to leave the university in April 2017.

Following her move to Indiana in 2017, Patberg began playing on the Indiana Hoosiers women's basketball team in 2018. From 2019 to 2020, Patberg held the season record in points and assists for Indiana. While with Indiana, Patberg's team reached the Elite Eight at the 2021 NCAA Division I women's basketball tournament. The following year, Patberg was one of the runner-ups at the 2022 Big Ten women's basketball tournament with Indiana. During her career, Patberg had 528 assists as part of her 1752 points. Upon leaving Indiana in 2022, she was in the top five for most assists and top ten for most points.

After being selected by the Indiana Fever during the 2022 WNBA draft, Patberg practiced with the team before she was cut in April 2022. The following month, Patberg became a coordinator for the women's basketball team at Indiana.

== Career statistics ==
Legend
GP	Games played	GS	Games started	MPG	Minutes per game	RPG	Rebounds per game
APG	Assists per game	SPG	Steals per game	BPG	Blocks per game	PPG	Points per game
TO	Turnovers per game	FG%	Field-goal percentage	3P%	3-point field-goal percentage	FT%	Free-throw percentage
**Bold**	Career best	°	League leader

== Awards and honors ==
In 2015, Patberg received the Indiana Miss Basketball and a Gatorade Player of the Year award for the state. That year, Patberg was the MaxPreps National Basketball Player of the Year for girls. She was also on the High School All-America Team for the Women's Basketball Coaches Association.

During 2021, Patberg was on the Academic All-America second team. In 2022, Patberg was a Senior CLASS Award nominee. That year, she received an Outstanding Sportsmanship Award from the Big Ten.
