= List of 2023 WNBA season transactions =

This is a list of transactions that have taken place during the off-season and the 2023 WNBA season.

== Front office movements ==
=== Head coach changes ===
Off-season

Departure date	Team	Outgoing head coach	Reason for departure	Hire date	Incoming head coach	Last coaching position	Ref.
August 17, 2022	Los Angeles Sparks	(United States) Fred Williams	Interim coach, contract not renewed	October 21	(United States) Curt Miller	Connecticut Sun head coach (2016–2022)	
August 31, 2022	Indiana Fever	(United States) Carlos Knox	Interim coach, contract not renewed	November 4	(United States) Christie Sides	Atlanta Dream assistant coach (2022)	
September 19, 2022	Dallas Wings	(United States) Vickie Johnson	Contract not exercised, fired	November 7	(United States) Latricia Trammell	Los Angeles Sparks assistant coach (2019–2022)	
October 21, 2022	Connecticut Sun	(United States) Curt Miller	Left for Sparks job	November 21	(United States) Stephanie White	Vanderbilt head coach (2016–2021)	
November 15, 2022	Washington Mystics	(United States) Mike Thibault	Retired	November 15	(United States) Eric Thibault	Washington Mystics associate head coach (2013–2022)	

Mid-season

Departure date	Team	Outgoing head coach	Reason for departure	Incoming head coach	Last coaching position	Ref.
June 26, 2023	Phoenix Mercury	(United States) Vanessa Nygaard	Fired	(United States) Nikki Blue	Phoenix Mercury (assistant)	
July 1, 2023	Chicago Sky	(United States) James Wade	Accepted position with Toronto Raptors	(Turkey) Emre Vatansever	Chicago Sky (assistant)	

== Player movement ==
Free agency negotiation began on January 21, 2023. Free agents were allowed to officially sign with their teams on February 1, 2023.

=== Trades ===
January
January 13	To Atlanta Dream: (United States) Danielle Robinson	To Indiana Fever: (Australia) Kristy Wallace
January 15	Three-team trade	
January 15	To Connecticut Sun: (Australia) Rebecca Allen (from New York); (United States) Tyasha Harris (from Dallas); 2023 first-round pick (Pick 6)	To Dallas Wings: (United States) Natasha Howard (from New York); (United States) Crystal Dangerfield (from New York)
January 15	To New York Liberty: (Bosnia and Herzegovina) Jonquel Jones (from Connecticut); (United States) Kayla Thornton (from Dallas)	
January 16	To Connecticut Sun: (United States) Olivia Nelson-Ododa; (United States) Jasmine Walker; (United States) Kianna Smith	To Los Angeles Sparks: (United States) Jasmine Thomas; 2023 first-round pick (Pick 10) (Zia Cooke)
January 21
January 21	To Los Angeles Sparks: (United States) Dearica Hamby; 2024 first-round pick (Pick 12)	To Las Vegas Aces: (Sweden) Amanda Zahui B; 2024 second-round pick (Pick 16) (Dyaisha Fair)
January 21	To Atlanta Dream: (United States) Allisha Gray	To Dallas Wings: 2023 first-round pick (Pick 3) (Maddy Siegrist); 2025 first-round pick (Pick 6)
February
February 5	To Washington Mystics: (Sweden) Amanda Zahui B	To Las Vegas Aces: 2024 second-round pick (Pick 18) (Kate Martin); 2025 second-round pick (Pick 16)
February 9	To Atlanta Dream: 2023 first-round pick (Pick 6) (Haley Jones)	To Connecticut Sun: (United States) Tiffany Hayes
February 11	Four-team trade	
February 11	To Chicago Sky: (United States) Marina Mabrey (from Dallas); 2024 second-round pick (Pick 13) (Brynna Maxwell)	To New York Liberty: (Germany) Leonie Fiebich (from Chicago); 2024 second-round pick (Pick 17) (Esmery Martínez); 2025 first-round pick swap (from Phoenix, Pick 12)
February 11	To Phoenix Mercury: (United States) Michaela Onyenwere (from New York); 2024 third-round pick (Pick 29) (Jaz Shelley); 2025 second-round pick (from Chicago, Pick 15)	To Dallas Wings: (United States) Diamond DeShields (from Phoenix); 2023 first-round pick (Pick 5) (Lou Lopez Sénéchal); 2024 first-round pick (Pick 5) (Jacy Sheldon); 2025 first-round pick swap (Pick 12) (Aziaha James)
April
April 10	To Dallas Wings: Draft rights to (Brazil) Stephanie Soares	To Washington Mystics: 2024 second-round pick (Pick 21) (Kaylynne Truong); 2025 first-round draft pick (Pick 6)(via Atlanta) (Georgia Amoore)
May
April 16	To Connecticut Sun: (United States) Leigha Brown	To Atlanta Dream: 2025 third-round pick (Pick 36) (Taylor Thierry)
July
July 4	To Washington Mystics: (United States) Queen Egbo	To Indiana Fever: (Sweden) Amanda Zahui B

=== Free agency ===
Player	Date signed	New team	Former team	Ref
(United States) Evina Westbrook	January 20	Washington Mystics		
(United States) Jazmine Jones	January 23	Washington Mystics		
(United States) Candace Parker	February 1	Las Vegas Aces	Chicago Sky	
(United States) Brittney Sykes	February 1	Washington Mystics	Los Angeles Sparks	
(Israel) Alysha Clark	February 1	Las Vegas Aces	Washington Mystics	
(United States) Nia Coffey	February 1	Atlanta Dream		
(United States) AD Durr	February 1	Atlanta Dream		
(United States) Teaira McCowan	February 1	Dallas Wings		
(Australia) Stephanie Talbot	February 1	Los Angeles Sparks	Seattle Storm	
(United States) Lexie Brown	February 1	Los Angeles Sparks		
(United States) Joyner Holmes	February 1	Connecticut Sun		
(United States) Shatori Walker-Kimbrough	February 1	Washington Mystics		
(Australia) Cayla George	February 1	Las Vegas Aces	Melbourne Boomers (Australia)	
(United States) Alexis Peterson	February 1	Las Vegas Aces	Angers (France)	
(United States) Courtney Range	February 1	Las Vegas Aces	Fribourg (Switzerland)	
(United States) Erica Wheeler	February 1	Indiana Fever	Atlanta Dream	
(United States) Tianna Hawkins	February 2	Washington Mystics		
(United States) Maya Caldwell	February 2	Indiana Fever	Atlanta Dream	
(United States) Chelsey Perry	February 2	Indiana Fever		
(United States) Rennia Davis	February 2	Indiana Fever		
(United States) Khayla Pointer	February 2	Indiana Fever		
(United States) Alisia Jenkins	February 2	Washington Mystics	Ramat Hasharon (Israeli)	
(United States) Crystal Dangerfield	February 2	Dallas Wings	New York Liberty	
(United States) Kalani Brown	February 2	Dallas Wings	Maccabi Bnot Ashdod (Israeli)	
(United States) Sam Thomas	February 2	Phoenix Mercury		
(United States) Sophie Cunningham	February 3	Phoenix Mercury		
(United States) Azurá Stevens	February 3	Los Angeles Sparks	Chicago Sky	
(Canada) Kia Nurse	February 3	Seattle Storm	Phoenix Mercury	
(United States) Elizabeth Williams	February 3	Chicago Sky	Washington Mystics	
(United States) Natisha Hiedeman	February 3	Connecticut Sun		
(Australia) Sami Whitcomb	February 3	Seattle Storm	New York Liberty	
(United States) Monique Billings	February 3	Atlanta Dream		
(United States) Megan Gustafson	February 3	Phoenix Mercury		
(Anguilla) Mikiah Herbert Harrigan	February 3	Seattle Storm	London Lions (Great Britain)	
(United States) Tiffany Mitchell	February 3	Minnesota Lynx	Indiana Fever	
(Canada) Bridget Carleton	February 3	Minnesota Lynx		
(Serbia) Nikolina Milić	February 3	Minnesota Lynx		
(Brazil) Damiris Dantas	February 3	Minnesota Lynx		
(United States) Lindsay Allen	February 3	Minnesota Lynx		
(United States) Courtney Williams	February 4	Chicago Sky	Connecticut Sun	
(Australia) Ezi Magbegor	February 4	Seattle Storm		
(United States) Kiana Williams	February 4	Minnesota Lynx	Cegledi EKK	
(United States) Stephanie Watts	February 4	Minnesota Lynx	AE Sedis Bàsquet (Spain)	
(United States) Maya Dodson	February 4	Minnesota Lynx	Poznań (Poland)	
(United States) Isabelle Harrison	February 5	Chicago Sky	Dallas Wings	
(United States) Victoria Vivians	February 5	Indiana Fever		
(United States) Feyonda Fitzgerald	February 5	Chicago Sky	Antalya 07 Basketbol (Turkey)	
(United States) Robyn Parks	February 5	Chicago Sky	Magnolia Basket Campobasso (France)	
(Puerto Rico) Arella Guirantes	February 6	Seattle Storm	DVTK Miskolc (Hungary)	
(United States) Kaila Charles	February 6	Seattle Storm	Hapoel Rishon Le-Zion (Israel)	
(United States) Yvonne Turner	February 6	Seattle Storm	Phoenix Mercury	
(United States) Sydney Wiese	February 6	Phoenix Mercury		
(United States) Jennie Simms	February 6	Phoenix Mercury		
(United States) Sydney Colson	February 6	Las Vegas Aces		
(United States) Stephanie Jones	February 6	Washington Mystics	Connecticut Sun	
(United States) Layshia Clarendon	February 7	Los Angeles Sparks		
(United States) Kiah Stokes	February 7	Las Vegas Aces		
(United States) Lauren Cox	February 7	Connecticut Sun	Valencia (Spain)	
(United Kingdom) Kristine Anigwe	February 7	Connecticut Sun	Ragusa (Italy)	
(Sweden) Amanda Zahui B	February 7	Washington Mystics	Schio (Italy)	
(United States) Breanna Stewart	February 8	New York Liberty	Seattle Storm	
(Hungary) Courtney Vandersloot	February 8	New York Liberty	Chicago Sky	
(Spain) Astou Ndour-Fall	February 8	Chicago Sky		
(Russia) Epiphanny Prince	February 8	New York Liberty	Seattle Storm	
(United States) Jordin Canada	February 8	Los Angeles Sparks		
(United States) Emma Cannon	February 8	Indiana Fever		
(United States) Theresa Plaisance	February 8	Seattle Storm	Las Vegas Aces	
(United States) Kiara Smith	February 10	Connecticut Sun	Florida	
(Mali) Sika Koné	February 10	New York Liberty	Gran Canaria (Spain)	
(United States) Brionna Jones	February 13	Connecticut Sun		
(United States) Moriah Jefferson	February 13	Phoenix Mercury	Minnesota Lynx	
(United States) Rebekah Gardner	February 13	Chicago Sky		
(Australia) Alanna Smith	February 14	Chicago Sky	Gorzow Wielkopolski (Poland)	
(United States) Tiffany Hayes	February 15	Connecticut Sun	Atlanta Dream	
(United States) Victoria Macaulay	February 15	Connecticut Sun	Botasspor Adana (Turkey)	
(Hungary) Bernadett Határ	February 15	Indiana Fever		
(Australia) Anneli Maley	February 16	Chicago Sky	Bendigo (Australia)	
(United States) Brittney Griner	February 17	Phoenix Mercury		
(United States) Shey Peddy	February 17	Phoenix Mercury		
(United States) Diana Taurasi	February 17	Phoenix Mercury		
(China) Han Xu	February 17	New York Liberty		
(Canada) Nirra Fields	February 17	Connecticut Sun	Emlak (Turkey)	
(United States) Rachel Banham	February 18	Minnesota Lynx		
(China) Yang Liwei	February 19	Los Angeles Sparks	Inner Mongolia (China)	
(Australia) Jade Melbourne	February 20	Seattle Storm	Canberra (Australia)	
(United States) Reshanda Gray	February 21	Los Angeles Sparks	Phoenix Mercury	
(United Kingdom) Karlie Samuelson	February 21	Los Angeles Sparks	Townsville (Australia)	
(United States) Beatrice Mompremier	February 21	Atlanta Dream		
(United States) Chiney Ogwumike	February 22	Los Angeles Sparks		
(Croatia) Ivana Dojkić	February 22	Seattle Storm	Virtus Segafredo Bologna (Italy)	
(United States) Nneka Ogwumike	February 24	Los Angeles Sparks		
(United States) Jasmine Walker	February 24	Seattle Storm	Los Angeles Sparks	
(United States) Sug Sutton	February 28	Phoenix Mercury		
(United States) Nyara Sabally	February 28	New York Liberty	Oregon	
(Latvia) Kitija Laksa	February 28	Dallas Wings	Virtus Segafredo Bologna (Italy)	
(United States) Destiny Slocum	March 2	Phoenix Mercury	Hatay (Turkey)	
(United States) Mikayla Pivec	March 2	Atlanta Dream	Bursa (Turkey)	
(France) Marine Johannès	March 2	New York Liberty		
(Italy) Lorela Cubaj	March 8	Atlanta Dream	Venezia (Italy)	
(China) Li Meng	March 13	Washington Mystics		
(United States) Morgan Green	March 21	New York Liberty	ELTE BEAC Budapest (Hungary)	
(Japan) Stephanie Mawuli	March 21	New York Liberty	Toyota Antelopes (Japan)	
(United States) Kylee Shook	March 24	Phoenix Mercury	Olympiacos (Greece)	
(United States) Essence Booker	April 11	Phoenix Mercury	UNLV	
(United States) Liz Dixon	April 12	Phoenix Mercury	Louisville	
(Nigeria) Elizabeth Balogun	April 12	Las Vegas Aces	Duke	
(United States) Khaalia Hillsmon	April 12	Connecticut Sun	Antalya 07 Basketbol (Turkey)	
(United States) Caitlin Bickle	April 12	Connecticut Sun	Baylor	
(United States) Jayla Everett	April 12	Connecticut Sun	St. John's	
(United States) Joyner Holmes	April 13	Los Angeles Sparks	Connecticut Sun	
(United States) Crystal Bradford	April 13	Los Angeles Sparks	Uni Girona CB (Spain) / AU Basketball	
(United States) Myah Selland	April 14	Minnesota Lynx	South Dakota State	
(United States) Keishana Washington	April 14	Minnesota Lynx	Drexel	
(United States) Morgan Bertsch	April 17	Chicago Sky	Kangoeroes Basket Mechelen (Belgium)	
(United States) Alaina Coates	April 20	Atlanta Dream	Galatasaray S.K. (Turkey)	
(United States) Kristi Toliver	April 25	Washington Mystics	Los Angeles Sparks	
(United States) Lasha Petree	April 27	Connecticut Sun	Purdue	
(United States) Diamond Battles	April 30	Connecticut Sun	Georgia	
(United States) Emily Engstler	May 1	Washington Mystics	Indiana Fever	
(United States) Liz Dixon	June 3	Connecticut Sun	Phoenix Mercury	
(United States) Taylor Mikesell	June 5	Atlanta Dream	Indiana Fever	
(United States) Karlie Samuelson	June 6	Los Angeles Sparks	Los Angeles Sparks	
(United States) Joyner Holmes	June 9	Seattle Storm	Los Angeles Sparks	
(United States) Odyssey Sims	June 28	Dallas Wings	Dallas Wings	
(Hungary) Bernadett Határ	July 26	Connecticut Sun	Indiana Fever	
(France) Gabby Williams	July 3	Seattle Storm		

=== Hardship contracts ===
Player	Date Signed	Date Released	Team	Ref
(United States) Karlie Samuelson	May 18	June 5	Los Angeles Sparks	
(United States) Epiphanny Prince	May 19	May 24	New York Liberty	
(United States) Liz Dixon	May 19	May 21	Phoenix Mercury	
(United States) Rae Burrell	May 27	May 29	Los Angeles Sparks	
(United States) Kalani Brown	May 30	June 28	Dallas Wings	
(United States) Odyssey Sims	June 6	June 15	Dallas Wings	
(United States) Khaalia Hillsman	June 9	June 17	Chicago Sky	
(United States) Taylor Soule	June 9	-	Chicago Sky	
(United States) Emily Engstler	June 14	July 26	Minnesota Lynx	
(United States) Destanni Henderson	June 16	July 16	Los Angeles Sparks	
(United States) Epiphanny Prince	June 17	June 20	New York Liberty	
(United States) Rae Burrell	June 17	-	Los Angeles Sparks	
(United States) Abby Meyers	June 20	July 4	Washington Mystics	
(United States) Sam Thomas	June 21	June 24	Phoenix Mercury	
(United States) Jennie Simms	June 22	July 20	Phoenix Mercury	
(United States) Epiphanny Prince	June 25	August 10	New York Liberty	
(United States) Kayana Traylor	June 26	July 20	Minnesota Lynx	
(United States) Alaina Coates	June 27	June 29	Phoenix Mercury	
(United States) Kalani Brown	June 29	-	Dallas Wings	
(United States) Linnae Harper	June 30	July 4	Washington Mystics	
(United States) Linnae Harper	July 5	August 12	Washington Mystics	
(Hungary) Cyesha Goree	July 12	August 14	Washington Mystics	
(United Kingdom) Kristine Anigwe	July 17	July 24	Connecticut Sun	
(United States) Ashley Joens	July 19	August 2	Las Vegas Aces	
(United States) Liz Dixon	July 20	August 5	Phoenix Mercury	
(United States) Abby Meyers	July 21	August 7	Washington Mystics	
(United States) Emily Engstler	July 28	August 4	Minnesota Lynx	
(United States) Evina Westbrook	July 31	-	Los Angeles Sparks	
(United States) Alaina Coates	August 2	-	Las Vegas Aces	
(United States) Ashley Joens	August 6	August 12	Dallas Wings	
(United States) Destanni Henderson	August 7	August 21	Phoenix Mercury	
(Israel) Jennie Simms	August 13	August 17	Washington Mystics	
(United States) Ashley Joens	August 18		Phoenix Mercury	
(United Kingdom) Kristine Anigwe	August 18	August 23	Connecticut Sun	
(United States) Madi Williams	August 22	September 5	Phoenix Mercury	
(United States) Christyn Williams	September 7	-	Phoenix Mercury	

=== Waived ===
Player	Date Waived	Former Team	Ref
(Argentina) Florencia Chagas	January 4	Indiana Fever	
(France) Iliana Rupert	February 6	Las Vegas Aces	
(United States) Jasmine Walker	February 15	Connecticut Sun	
(United Kingdom) Kristine Anigwe	February 16	Connecticut Sun	
(United States) Joyner Holmes	February 21	Connecticut Sun	
(United States) Chennedy Carter	March 17	Los Angeles Sparks	
(United States) Khayla Pointer	April 4	Indiana Fever	
(Canada) Nirra Fields	April 15	Connecticut Sun	
(United States) Beatrice Mompremier	April 17	Atlanta Dream	
(United States) Chelsey Perry	April 23	Indiana Fever	
(Nigeria) Elizabeth Balogun	April 24	Las Vegas Aces	
(United States) Emily Engstler	April 26	Indiana Fever	
(United States) Sydney Wiese	April 27	Phoenix Mercury	
(United States) Lasha Petree	April 30	Connecticut Sun	
(United States) Lauren Cox	June 1	Connecticut Sun	
(Italy) Lorela Cubaj	June 3	Atlanta Dream	
(United States) Joyner Holmes	June 5	Los Angeles Sparks	
(Hungary) Bernadett Határ	June 8	Indiana Fever	
(United States) Kaila Charles	June 9	Seattle Storm	
(United States) Evina Westbrook	June 22	Phoenix Mercury	
(United States) Jasmine Dickey	June 28	Dallas Wings	
(United States) Ashley Joens	June 28	Dallas Wings	
(Puerto Rico) Arella Guirantes	June 29	Seattle Storm	
(United Kingdom) Kristine Anigwe	July 3	Chicago Sky	
(United States) Taylor Mikesell	July 3	Atlanta Dream	
(United States) Liz Dixon	July 15	Connecticut Sun	
(Croatia) Ivana Dojkić	August 10	Seattle Storm	

=== Waiver claims ===
Player	Date Claimed	New Team	Ref
(France) Iliana Rupert	February 11	Atlanta Dream	
(United Kingdom) Kristine Anigwe	February 21	Chicago Sky	
(United States) Evina Westbrook	May 9	Phoenix Mercury	
(United States) Nia Clouden	May 18	Los Angeles Sparks	
(Mali) Sika Koné	May 18	Chicago Sky	

=== Contract suspensions ===
Player	Date Suspended	Date Unsuspended	Team	Reason	Ref
(United States) Bella Alarie	February 1	-	Dallas Wings	Personal Decision	
(Belgium) Julie Allemand	February 14	-	Chicago Sky	Personal Decision	
(Australia) Stephanie Talbot	February 28	-	Los Angeles Sparks	Non-WNBA Injury	
(Spain) Astou Ndour-Fall	April 12	-	Chicago Sky	Personal Decision	
(Latvia) Kitija Laksa	May 10	-	Dallas Wings	Overseas Commitments	
(China) Li Yueru	May 18	-	Chicago Sky	Non-WNBA Injury	
(Hungary) Bernadett Határ	May 18	-	Indiana Fever	Overseas Commitments - Temporary	
(France) Iliana Rupert	May 18	July 4	Atlanta Dream	Overseas Commitments - Temporary	
(France) Marine Johannès	May 18	May 30	New York Liberty	Overseas Commitments - Temporary	
(United States) Teaira McCowan	June 2	June 20	Dallas Wings	Overseas Commitments - Temporary	
(United Kingdom) Kristine Anigwe	June 5	June 22	Chicago Sky	Overseas Commitments - Temporary	
(China) Han Xu	June 3	July 5	New York Liberty	Overseas Commitments - Temporary	
(China) Li Meng	June 19	July 5	Washington Mystics	Overseas Commitments - Temporary	
(China) Han Xu	July 16	August 12	New York Liberty	Overseas Commitments - Temporary	
(Mali) Sika Koné	July 27	August 8	Chicago Sky	Overseas Commitments - Temporary	
(China) Han Xu	September 10		New York Liberty	Overseas Commitments - Temporary	

=== Inactive ===
Player	Date on Inactive	Date Returned	Team	Reason	Ref
(Canada) Natalie Achonwa	May 18		Minnesota Lynx	Pregnancy/Child-Birth	
(United States) Skylar Diggins-Smith	May 18		Phoenix Mercury	Pregnancy/Child-Birth	
(United States) Katie Lou Samuelson	May 18		Los Angeles Sparks	Pregnancy/Child-Birth	
(United States) Ruthy Hebard	May 18	July 3	Chicago Sky	Pregnancy/Child-Birth	

=== Contract extensions ===
Player	Date	Team	Ref
(United States) A'ja Wilson	June 30	Las Vegas Aces	
(United States) Ariel Atkins	August 15	Washington Mystics	
(United States) Kayla Thornton	August 31	New York Liberty	
(United States) Kayla McBride	September 8	Minnesota Lynx	
(United States) Jewell Loyd	September 9	Seattle Storm	
(United States) Betnijah Laney	September 9	New York Liberty	
(United States) Kahleah Copper	September 10	Chicago Sky	

=== Training camp cuts ===
All players listed did not make the final roster.

Atlanta Dream	Chicago Sky	Connecticut Sun	Dallas Wings
Alaina Coates; Mikayla Pivec	Angel Baker; Feyonda Fitzgerald; Anneli Maley; Kayana Traylor	Diamond Battles; Caitlin Bickle; Nia Clouden; Jayla Everett; Mikiah Herbert Harrigan; Khaalia Hillsman; Victoria Macaulay; Alexis Morris; Ashten Prechtel; Kiara Smith	Kalani Brown; Charli Collier; Abby Meyers
Indiana Fever	Las Vegas Aces	Los Angeles Sparks	Minnesota Lynx
Rennia Davis; Destanni Henderson; Taylor Mikesell; LaDazhia Williams	Brittany Davis; Alexis Peterson; Courtney Range; Aisha Sheppard	Crystal Bradford; Rae Burrell; Monika Czinano; Reshanda Gray; Yang Liwei; Karlie Samuelson	Brea Beal; Damiris Dantas; Maya Dodson; Myah Selland; Taylor Soule; Keishana Washington; Stephanie Watts; Kiana Williams
New York Liberty	Phoenix Mercury	Seattle Storm	Washington Mystics
Morgan Green; Sika Koné; Stephanie Mawuli; Epiphanny Prince; Didi Richards	Essence Booker; Liz Dixon; Destiny Harden; Kylee Shook; Jennie Simms; Destiny Slocum; Sam Thomas	Jade Loville; Theresa Plaisance; Jasmine Walker; Madi Williams	Emily Engstler; Alisia Jenkins; Jazmine Jones; Stephanie Jones; Elena Tsineke; Evina Westbrook

== Draft ==
=== First round ===
Pick	Player	Date signed	Team	Ref
1	(United States) Aliyah Boston	April 17	Indiana Fever	
2	(United States) Diamond Miller	April 14	Minnesota Lynx	
3	(United States) Maddy Siegrist	April 12	Dallas Wings	
4	(Brazil) Stephanie Soares		Washington Mystics	
5	(France) / (Mexico) Lou Lopez Sénéchal	April 13	Dallas Wings	
6	(United States) Haley Jones	April 18	Atlanta Dream	
7	(United States) Grace Berger	April 14	Indiana Fever	
8	(Canada) Laeticia Amihere	April 13	Atlanta Dream	
9	(United States) Jordan Horston	April 14	Seattle Storm	
10	(United States) Zia Cooke	April 13	Los Angeles Sparks	
11	(United States) Abby Meyers	April 13	Dallas Wings	
12	(France) Maïa Hirsch		Minnesota Lynx	

=== Second round ===
Pick	Player	Date signed	Team	Ref
13	(United States) Taylor Mikesell	April 14	Indiana Fever	
14	(Australia) Shaneice Swain		Los Angeles Sparks	
15	(United States) Leigha Brown	April 18	Atlanta Dream	
16	(Hungary) Dorka Juhász	April 14	Minnesota Lynx	
17	(United States) LaDazhia Williams	April 14	Indiana Fever	
18	(United States) Madi Williams	April 17	Seattle Storm	
19	(United States) Ashley Joens	April 15	Dallas Wings	
20	(Greece) Elena Tsineke	April 13	Washington Mystics	
21	(Cameroon) Dulcy Fankam Mendjiadeu	April 14	Seattle Storm	
22	(United States) Alexis Morris	April 18	Connecticut Sun	
23	(United States) Kayana Traylor	April 29	Chicago Sky	
24	(United States) Brea Beal	April 14	Minnesota Lynx	

=== Third round ===
Pick	Player	Date signed	Team	Ref
25	(United States) Victaria Saxton	April 14	Indiana Fever	
26	(United States) Monika Czinano	April 13	Los Angeles Sparks	
27	(United States) Destiny Harden	April 12	Phoenix Mercury	
28	(United States) Taylor Soule	April 14	Minnesota Lynx	
29	(France) Kadi Sissoko	April 12	Phoenix Mercury	
30	(Denmark) Okako Adika		New York Liberty	
31	(United States) Paige Robinson		Dallas Wings	
32	(Spain) Txell Alarcón		Washington Mystics	
33	(United States) Jade Loville	April 14	Seattle Storm	
34	(United States) Ashten Prechtel	April 12	Connecticut Sun	
35	(Belarus) Kseniya Malashka		Chicago Sky	
36	(United States) Brittany Davis	April 14	Las Vegas Aces	
