= 2024–25 Israeli Women's Basketball Premier League =

Women's basketball league in Israel

Israeli Women's Basketball Premier League
- Season: 2024–25
- Dates: Regular season: 14 October 2024 – 17 February 2025; Winners and losers stage: 24 February – 27 March 2025; Play Offs: 31 March – 4 May 2025
- Teams: 10

Regular season
- Season MVP: (Israel) Jennie Simms

Finals
- Champions: Maccabi Bnot Ashdod (7th title)
- Runners-up: Hapoel Rishon LeZion
- Finals MVP: (United States) Stasha Carey

Statistical leaders
| Points | (United States) Ashley Owusu | 22.5 |
| Rebounds | (United States) Alisia Jenkins | 13.6 |
| Assists | (Slovakia) Gili Eisner | 7.8 |
| Steals | (United States) Alisia Jenkins | 3.3 |
| Blocks | (United Kingdom) Mikiah Herbert Harrigan | 2.1 |

The 2024–25 Israeli Women's Basketball Premier League is the 68th season of the top division women's basketball league in Israel since its establishment in 1957. It starts in October 2024 with the first round of the regular season and ends in May 2025.

Elitzur Ramla are the defending champions.

Maccabi Bnot Ashdod won their seventh title after beating Hapoel Rishon LeZion in the final.

== Format ==
In the first round, each team plays each other twice. The top six progress to the winners stage while the bottom four advance to the losers stage. In the winners stage, teams play each other once and the top four reach the play offs. In the losers stage, teams play each other twice but nobody advances to the play offs. Every round in the playoffs is played as a best of five series.

== Regular season ==
| Pos | Team | Pld | W | L | PF | PA | PD | Pts | Qualification |
|---|---|---|---|---|---|---|---|---|---|
| 1 | Hapoel Rishon LeZion | 18 | 15 | 3 | 1474 | 1241 | +233 | 33 (Note: Hapoel Rishon LeZion 160–151 Maccabi Bnot Ashdod) | Winners stage |
| 2 | Maccabi Bnot Ashdod | 18 | 15 | 3 | 1514 | 1306 | +208 | 33 | Winners stage |
| 3 | Hapoel Lev Jerusalem | 18 | 13 | 5 | 1469 | 1340 | +129 | 31 (Note: Hapoel Lev Jerusalem 184–180 Elitzur Ramla) | Winners stage |
| 4 | Elitzur Ramla | 18 | 13 | 5 | 1499 | 1396 | +103 | 31 | Winners stage |
| 5 | Maccabi Haifa | 18 | 8 | 10 | 1315 | 1321 | −6 | 26 (Note: Maccabi Haifa 146–145 Elitzur Holon) | Winners stage |
| 6 | Elitzur Holon | 18 | 8 | 10 | 1405 | 1405 | 0 | 26 | Winners stage |
| 7 | Ramat HaSharon | 18 | 7 | 11 | 1308 | 1346 | −38 | 25 | Losers stage |
| 8 | Hapoel Kfar Saba | 18 | 4 | 14 | 1288 | 1600 | −312 | 22 (Note: Hapoel Kfar Saba 153–145 Hapoel Petah Tikva) | Losers stage |
| 9 | Hapoel Petah Tikva | 18 | 4 | 14 | 1236 | 1438 | −202 | 22 | Losers stage |
| 10 | Maccabi Ironi Ramat Gan | 18 | 3 | 15 | 1271 | 1386 | −115 | 21 | Losers stage |

Source: Women's Basketball Premier League
Rules for classification: 1) Points; 2) Points difference; 3) Points scored.

=== Winners stage ===
| Pos | Team | Pld | W | L | PF | PA | PD | Pts | Qualification |
|---|---|---|---|---|---|---|---|---|---|
| 1 | Maccabi Bnot Ashdod | 23 | 19 | 4 | 1947 | 1679 | +268 | 42 | Play Offs |
| 2 | Hapoel Rishon LeZion | 23 | 18 | 5 | 1843 | 1578 | +265 | 41 | Play Offs |
| 3 | Elitzur Ramla | 23 | 17 | 6 | 1948 | 1830 | +118 | 40 | Play Offs |
| 4 | Hapoel Lev Jerusalem | 23 | 14 | 9 | 1831 | 1780 | +51 | 37 | Play Offs |
| 5 | Maccabi Haifa | 23 | 10 | 13 | 1694 | 1731 | −37 | 33 | |
| 6 | Elitzur Holon | 23 | 9 | 14 | 1815 | 1813 | +2 | 32 | |

Source: Women's Basketball Premier League
Rules for classification: 1) Points; 2) Points difference; 3) Points scored.

=== Losers stage ===
| Pos | Team | Pld | W | L | PF | PA | PD | Pts | Qualification |
|---|---|---|---|---|---|---|---|---|---|
| 7 | Ramat HaSharon | 24 | 11 | 13 | 1749 | 1765 | −16 | 35 | |
| 8 | Hapoel Petah Tikva | 24 | 8 | 16 | 1638 | 1828 | −190 | 32 | |
| 9 | Maccabi Ironi Ramat Gan | 24 | 7 | 17 | 1695 | 1782 | −87 | 31 | |
| 10 | Hapoel Kfar Saba | 24 | 4 | 20 | 1695 | 2069 | −374 | 28 | Relegation |

Source: Women's Basketball Premier League
Rules for classification: 1) Points; 2) Points difference; 3) Points scored.

== Play offs ==
Semifinals
1 | Maccabi Bnot Ashdod | 78 | 78 | 57 | 56 | 83 | 3
4 | Hapoel Lev Jerusalem | 79 | 68 | 63 | 55 | 70 | 2
2 | Hapoel Rishon LeZion | 94 | 84 | 72 | 3
3 | Elitzur Ramla | 73 | 60 | 66 | 0

Final
1 | Maccabi Bnot Ashdod | 58 | 61 | 63 | 47 | 76 | 3
2 | Hapoel Rishon LeZion | 65 | 54 | 58 | 77 | 60 | 2

Champions of Israel

Maccabi Bnot Ashdod
Seventh title
