= Alyssa Baron =

American-Israeli basketball player

Personal information
- Born: April 16, 1992 (age 34)
- Listed height: 5 ft 10 in (1.78 m)

Career information
- High school: Gulliver Preparatory School (Miami, Florida)
- College: University of Pennsylvania (2010-2014)
- Position: Shooting guard

Career history
- 2014-2016: A. S. Ramat HaSharon
- 2016-2017: Ironi Ramat Gan
- 2017-2019: Maccabi Bnot Ashdod
- 2020-2023: Elitzur Ramla
- 2023-2025: Hapoel Lev Jerusalem
- 2025-2026: Elitzur Holon

Career highlights
- Ivy League Rookie of the Year (2011); Ivy League champion (2014); Ivy League Player of the Year (2014); 2x Israeli Premier League champion (2022, 2023); 2x Israeli State Cup (2017, 2024); Israeli Premier League MVP (2026)

Alyssa Baron (Hebrew: אליסה ברון; born April 16, 1992) is an American-Israeli professional basketball player. She played college basketball for the Pennsylvania Quakers where she won an Ivy League title and twice led the league in scoring. She joined the Israeli Premier League in 2014 and has won two league titles and two Israeli State Cups. She has also played for the Israeli National Team.

== High School and College Career ==
Baron played four years of varsity basketball for Gulliver Preparatory School in Miami, where she was also a member of the track and field team. She joined the Penn Quakers women's basketball team in 2010. She was the first freshman in Ivy League history to lead the league in scoring (16.6 ppg). In her sophomore year she won Ivy League scoring title for the second straight year (16.9 points per game). In her senior year she won the Ivy League championship and was Ivy League Player of the Year. Baron left Penn as the program's second all-time leading scorer (the first being Diana M. Caramanico).

In the summer of 2013, she participated in the Maccabiah Games where she won the gold medal with the American team.

== Penn Statistics ==
Legend
GP	Games played	GS	Games started	MPG	Minutes per game
FG%	Field goal percentage	3P%	3-point field goal percentage	FT%	Free throw percentage
RPG	Rebounds per game	APG	Assists per game	SPG	Steals per game
BPG	Blocks per game	PPG	Points per game	**Bold**	Career high

Year	Team	GP	Points	FG%	3P%	FT%	RPG	APG	SPG	BPG	PPG
2010-11	Penn	28	464	37.6	**35.1**	68.8	4,1	2.4	1.3	0.2	16.6
2011-12	Penn	28	**472**	36.0	32.8	**80.3**	5.5	2.4	**2.0**	**0.7**	**16.9**
2012-13	Penn	**31**	437	**37.7**	27.2	76.9	**6.4**	**3.8**	1.9	0.4	14.1
2013-14	Penn	29	433	36.6	31.1	79.3	5.8	3.4	1.7	0.2	14.9
Career	Penn	116	1806	37.0	31.3	76.5	5.5	3.0	1.7	0.4	15.6

== Professional career ==
=== Club career ===
In 2014 she joined Ramat HaSharon of the Israeli Premier league. After two seasons with Ramat Hasharon she joined Ramat Gan. In the 2016/17 season Ramat Gan won the Israeli State Cup after beating Elitzur Holon in the final. That season Ramat Gan reached the league final, where they lost to Maccabi Bnot Ashdod.

Baron joined Maccabi Bnot Ashdod in 2017. Again, she reached the playoff finals in which Ashdod lost to Elitzur Ramla. In 2020 Baron joined Elitzur Ramla. She won the league championship in 2022 and 2023, beating Ashdod in the finals both times. In 2022 she was chosen finals MVP.

In 2023 she joined Hapoel Lev Jerusalem. The team's head coach was Limor Peleg, who is Baron's wife. During the 2023/24 season, Hapoel Lev Jerusalem won the State Cup after beating Ramla in the finals. The team also reached the playoff finals, where they lost to Ramla.

In May 2025 Baron joined Elitzur Holon, along with her wife Limor Peleg.Holon reached the playoff finals, where they were swept by Hapoel Rishon Lezion. Baron was injured in the first game of the series and did not return to play. Baron was chosen the league's MVP for the 2025/26 season.

=== International career ===
While playing for Ramla, Baron participated in the Euroleague and Eurocup.

Baron's Jewish heritage allowed her to become an Israeli naturalized citizen. She played for the Israeli National Team for the first time in November 2022 in a EuroBasket qualifier. She played with the national team in the 2023 EuroBasket. Israel was eliminated after the first round.

Baron has also played for the Israeli 3*3 Basketball Team. She participated in the 2023 FIBA 3x3 Europe Cup that was held in Jerusalem. Israel was eliminated after the preliminary round.

== Personal life ==
Baron is married to Limor Peleg, her head coach at Elitzur Holon. They have one son and reside in Rishon LeZion. She majored in communications at the University of Pennsylvania.
