= Abby Meyers =

American-Israeli basketball player (born 1999)

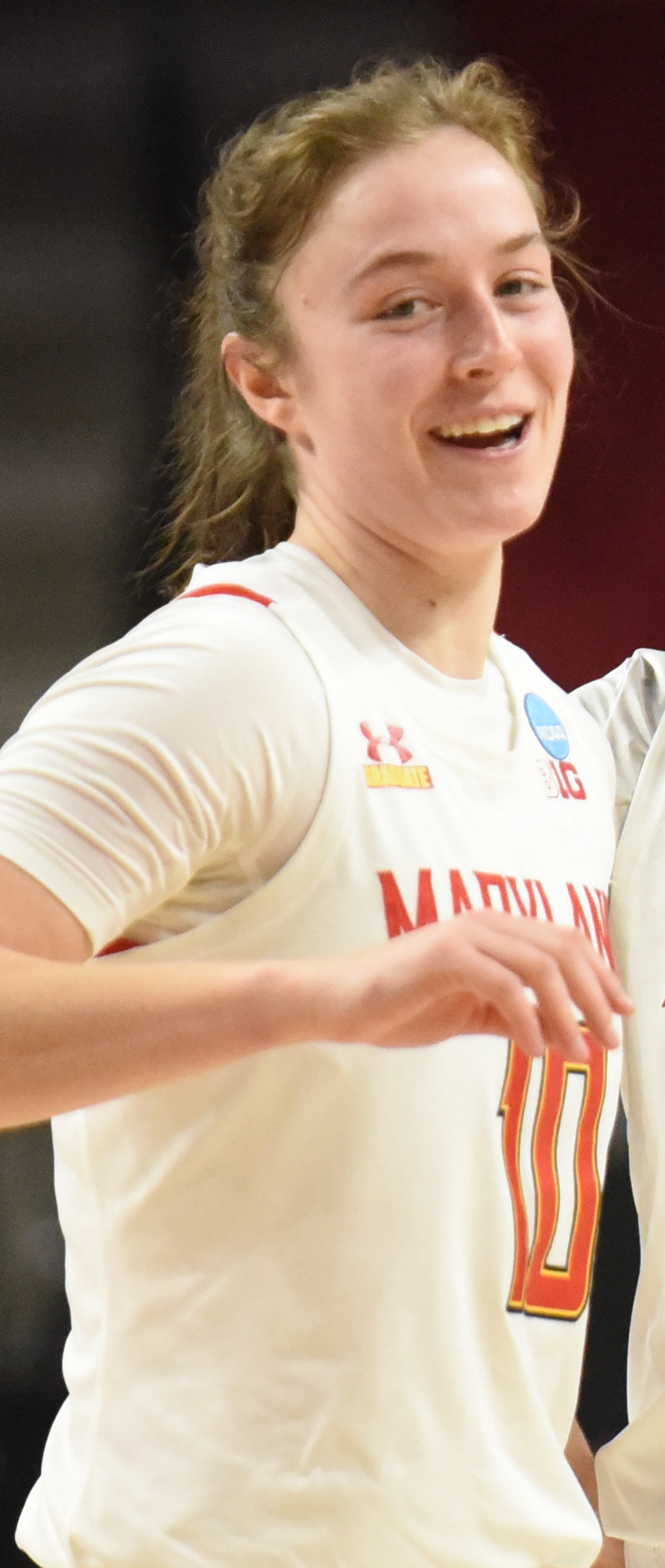
- Meyers with Maryland in 2023

No. 10 – Perfumerías Avenida
- Position: Guard
- League: Spanish League

Personal information
- Born: July 14, 1999 (age 27) Potomac, Maryland, U.S.
- Listed height: 6 ft 0 in (1.83 m)
- Listed weight: 154 lb (70 kg)

Career information
- High school: Walt Whitman (Bethesda, Maryland)
- College: Princeton (2017–2022); Maryland (2022–2023)
- WNBA draft: 2023: 1st round, 11th overall pick
- Drafted by: Dallas Wings
- Playing career: 2023–present

Career history
- 2023: Washington Mystics
- 2023–2024: London Lions
- 2024–2025: Maccabi Bnot Ashdod
- 2025–2026: Perfumerías Avenida
- 2026-present: Maccabi Bnot Ashdod

Career highlights
- Ivy League Player of the Year (2022); First-team All-Ivy League (2022); Honorable Mention All-America (2022); Second-team All-Big Ten (2023); British Basketball League championship (2024); Israeli Premier League championship (2025); Israeli State Cup (2025); Israeli Premier League MVP (2025)
- Stats at Basketball Reference
Medals
Women's basketball
Representing the United States
Maccabiah Games
Gold medal – first place	2022 Jerusalem	Team

Abigail "Abby" Meyers (born July 14, 1999) is an American-Israeli professional basketball player for Maccabi Bnot Ashdod of the Israeli Women's Basketball Premier League and EuroCup Women, and for the Israel women's national basketball team.

She played college basketball at Princeton and Maryland. Meyers was drafted in the first round, 11th overall, by the Dallas Wings in the 2023 WNBA draft.

She has previously played for the London Lions, where she won the British League title and the Eurocup, and Perfumerías Avenida of the Spanish League. During her first stint in Ashdod she won the Israeli League title, Israeli state cup and was also named Israeli League MVP.

== Early and personal life ==
Meyers is the daughter of Valerie and Steven Meyers, and has two sisters, Emily, and a twin, Olivia. Meyers is Jewish, and attended the Reform Jewish synagogue Washington Hebrew Congregation in Washington, D.C.

She attended Walt Whitman High School in Bethesda, Maryland, where she is the school's all-time leading scorer, male or female. She helped lead the Vikings to three state semifinals from 2015 to 2017. During her junior year she helped lead her team to a 24–3 record and the 4A state final. During the 2016 championship game, she scored 21 points to help her team win the state title, their first state title since 1995. During her senior year, she helped lead her team to a 22–5 record and their second consecutive state final. During the 2017 championship game, she recorded 26 points and 12 rebounds in a 46–49 loss to Catonsville, failing to repeat as state champions. She was named Montgomery County Player of the Year and 2016–17 First Team All-State MBCA. Meyers also played soccer and ultimate frisbee in high school.

== College career ==
Meyers began her collegiate at Princeton during the 2017–18 season. In her freshman year, she averaged 9.4 points and 3.0 rebounds in 28 games for Princeton. During the 2018 Ivy League women's basketball tournament, she averaged 13.0 points and 3.0 rebounds in two games to help lead Princeton to their first Ivy League tournament championship. She was subsequently named to the All-Ivy League tournament team. After a gap year, as a sophomore during the 2019–20 season, she averaged 6.3 points and 2.7 rebounds in 23 games off the bench. The Ivy League cancelled the 2020–21 season due to COVID-19 concerns.

During the 2021–22 season, in her junior year, she led Princeton with 17.9 points and 5.8 rebounds per game, as she shot 45.9 percent from the field and 40.9 percent from three-point range. She ranked first in the conference in three-point percentage, effective field goal percentage, true shooting percentage, and player efficiency rating, second in scoring, third in two-point field goal percentage (15.9%), and eighth in rebounds. She helped lead Princeton to a third consecutive Ivy League championship. During the first round of the 2022 NCAA Division I women's basketball tournament, Meyers scored a career-high 29 points and upset Kentucky to advance to the second round for the second time in program history. Following the season she was named the Ivy League Player of the Year and a unanimous selection to the All-Ivy first team. She was also named an Associated Press All-American honorable mention, becoming the fourth All-American in program history. Meyers graduated from Princeton University with a bachelor's degree in public policy and international affairs.

On April 15, 2022, Meyers announced she was transferring as a graduate to Maryland. During the 2022–23 season, in her first season at Maryland, she had the lowest turnover percentage (10.0) in the Big Ten Conference, and averaged 14.3 points, 5.1 rebounds, and 1.8 steals (9th in the conference) per game. She helped the Terrapins advance to the Elite Eight at the 2023 NCAA Division I women's basketball tournament for the first time since 2015. Following the season she was named to the All-Big Ten second team.

== Professional career ==
On April 10, 2023, Meyers was drafted in the first round, 11th overall, by the Dallas Wings in the 2023 WNBA draft. Meyers was waived during training camp and did not make the team.

=== Washington Mystics ===
On June 20, 2023, Meyers signed a hardship contract with the Washington Mystics. She played for the Mystics for two weeks, before being released from her hardship contract on July 4, 2023. Meyers returned to the Mystics on a 7-day contract on July 21, 2023. Meyers signed three 7-day contracts with the Mystics before being released on August 7, 2023.

=== London Lions ===
On August 1, 2023, Meyers signed with the London Lions of the Women's British Basketball League (WBBL). She helped the Lions win the British Basketball League championship and the EuroCup, which is the second-highest level of European competition.

=== Maccabi Bnot Ashdod ===
In May 2024, Meyers joined Maccabi Bnot Ashdod of the Israeli Women's Basketball Premier League. She helped Ashdod win the Premier League title as well as the Israeli State Cup. She was Ashdod's leading scorer in the Cup Final against Hapoel Lev Jerusalem with 21 points. Meyers was also named league MVP after averaging 17.4 points, 7.4 rebounds, and 3.8 assists in 36.7 minutes per game.

Meyers rejoined Ashdod in June 2026 after one season in Spain.

=== Perfumerías Avenida ===
In May 2025, Meyers joined Perfumerías Avenida of the Liga Femenina de Baloncesto.

== Career statistics ==
Legend
GP	Games played	GS	Games started	MPG	Minutes per game	RPG	Rebounds per game
APG	Assists per game	SPG	Steals per game	BPG	Blocks per game	PPG	Points per game
TO	Turnovers per game	FG%	Field-goal percentage	3P%	3-point field-goal percentage	FT%	Free-throw percentage
**Bold**	Career best	°	League leader

=== College ===
Year	Team	GP	GS	MPG	FG%	3P%	FT%	RPG	APG	SPG	BPG	TO	PPG
2017–18	Princeton	28	0	17.4	.402	.331	**.853**	3.0	1.4	1.1	0.4	**1.1**	9.4
2019–20	Princeton	23	0	14.7	.384	.284	.542	2.7	0.8	0.6	0.3	**1.1**	6.3
2021–22	Princeton	30	30	29.2	.450	**.393**	.809	**5.8**	1.6	1.4	**0.5**	1.7	**17.9**
2022–23	Maryland	**35**	**34**	**30.5**	**.455**	.388	.750	5.1	**2.3**	**1.8**	**0.5**	1.5	14.3
**Career**		116	64	23.9	.435	.362	.768	4.3	1.6	1.3	0.4	1.7	12.5

=== WNBA career statistics ===
==== Regular season ====
Year	Team	GP	GS	MPG	FG%	3P%	FT%	RPG	APG	SPG	BPG	TO	PPG
2023	Washington	9	0	4.0	.385	.000	1.000	0.4	0.0	0.1	0.2	0.1	1.4
Career	1 year, 1 team	9	0	4.0	.385	.000	1.000	0.4	0.0	0.1	0.2	0.1	1.4

== National team career ==
Meyers represented the United States at the 2022 Maccabiah Games in Israel, where she was team captain and averaged 18.4 points per game. In the championship game, she recorded a double-double with 16 points and 11 rebounds while adding four steals to help Team USA win a gold medal. She said: "It was just a very, very humbling, cool experience to be recognized as one of the best Jewish basketball players of my age in the country."

Meyers made her Israel women's national basketball team debut in November 2025, in a EuroBasket 2027 qualifier against Bosnia, scoring 21 points.

== See also ==
- List of select Jewish basketball players
