= Tiffany Mitchell (basketball) =

American basketball player (born 1994)

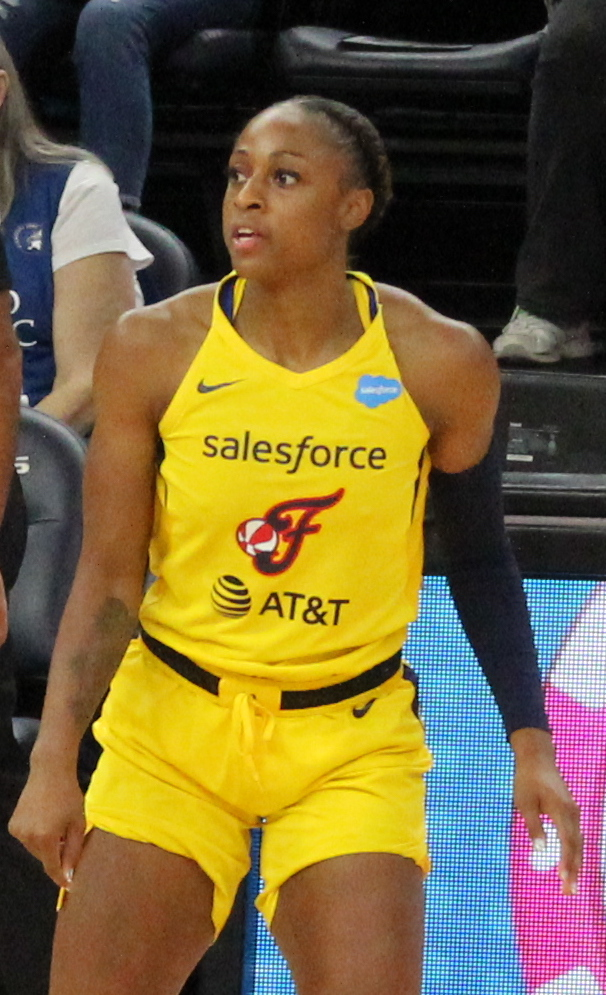
- Mitchell in 2019

Free agent
- Position: Shooting guard

Personal information
- Born: September 23, 1994 (age 32) Charlotte, North Carolina, U.S.
- Listed height: 5 ft 9 in (1.75 m)
- Listed weight: 169 lb (77 kg)

Career information
- High school: Providence Day (Charlotte, North Carolina)
- College: South Carolina (2012–2016)
- WNBA draft: 2016: 1st round, 9th overall pick
- Drafted by: Indiana Fever
- Playing career: 2016–present

Career history
- 2016–2022: Indiana Fever
- 2016–2017: Nadezhda Orenburg
- 2018: Mersin Büyükşehir Belediyespor
- 2018–2019: OGM Ormanspor
- 2019–2021: Elitzur Ramla
- 2021–2023: Melbourne Boomers
- 2023: Minnesota Lynx
- 2023: Galatasaray
- 2023: REG
- 2024: Connecticut Sun
- 2024–2025: Hapoel Lev Jerusalem
- 2025: Las Vegas Aces
- 2025: Seattle Storm
- 2025–2026: Beijing Great Wall

Career highlights
- WNBL championship (2022); Israeli championship (2019); Israeli State Cup (2019); WNBA All-Rookie Team (2016); Dawn Staley Award (2015); 2× All-American – USBWA (2015, 2016); Second-team All-American – AP (2016); First-team All-American – AP (2015); Third-team All-American – AP (2014); 2× WBCA Coaches' All-American (2014, 2015); 2× SEC Player of the Year (2014, 2015); SEC tournament MVP (2016); SEC All-Defensive Team (2014); 3× First-team All-SEC (2014–2016); SEC All-Freshman Team (2013); No. 25 retired by South Carolina Gamecocks; North Carolina Miss Basketball (2012)
- Stats at WNBA.com
- Stats at Basketball Reference
Medals
Women's basketball
Representing the United States
Pan American Games
Silver medal – second place	2015 Toronto	Team
Representing United States
Basketball 3x3
FIBA 3x3 World Cup
Gold medal – first place	2014 Russia	Team

Tiffany Mitchell (born September 23, 1994) is an American professional basketball player. Mitchell played college basketball for the South Carolina Gamecocks, where she was a two-time SEC Player of the Year. After concluding her collegiate career, she was selected ninth overall in the 2016 WNBA draft by the Indiana Fever. During the WNBA off-seasons, Mitchell has played overseas in Russia, Turkey, Israel and Australia.

== College career ==
Between 2012 and 2016, Mitchell played college basketball for the South Carolina Gamecocks. In 2014 and 2015, she was named the SEC Player of the Year.

== Professional career ==
=== WNBA ===
Mitchell was selected ninth overall in the 2016 WNBA draft by the Indiana Fever. She scored a game-high 18 points for the Fever in her WNBA debut. She played all 34 games during the 2016 season and averaged 8.6 points per game, earning a place in the WNBA All-Rookie Team. In 2021, she played her sixth season for the Fever.

On January 31, 2024, Mitchell was traded to the Connecticut Sun alongside the 19th pick in the 2024 WNBA draft in exchange for Natisha Hiedeman.

On February 7, 2025, she signed as a free agent with the Las Vegas Aces. She was waived by the Aces on June 30. She was subsequently signed by the Seattle Storm on July 11.

=== Overseas ===
In her first WNBA off-season, Mitchell played for Nadezhda Orenburg of the Russian Women's Basketball Premier League during the 2016–17 season.

Mitchell's next overseas stint came during the 2018–19 season. She started the season in Turkey with Mersin Büyükşehir Belediyespor, later joining OGM Ormanspor in December 2018. She left OGM Ormanspor in January 2019 and in March 2019 joined Elitzur Ramla from Israeli League. Mitchell returned to Elitzur Ramla for the 2019–20 and 2020–21 seasons and win championship.

In December 2024 returned to Israeli League and joined to Hapoel Lev Jerusalem for the 2024–25 seasons.

On February 28, 2026, Mitchell's former head coach during her time with the Gamecocks, Dawn Staley, announced that the college was working towards repatriating Mitchell from Israel as a result of the 2026 Iran War.

==== Melbourne Boomers ====
For the 2021–22 season, Mitchell moved to Australia to play for the Melbourne Boomers of the Women's National Basketball League (WNBL). The Boomers won the WNBL title in that season, Mitchell scoring 16 points in the deciding game against Perth.

==== Galatasaray ====
On 19 July 2023, she signed with Galatasaray of the Turkish Women's Basketball Super League (TKBL).

On 30 November 2023, Galatasaray and Mitchell announced that they parted ways by mutual agreement.

==== REG ====
In November 2023, Mitchell was announced by Rwandan club REG for the FIBA Africa Women's Basketball League. Mitchell was the top scorer of the league season, after averaging 23.7 points per game on 45.2% shooting from the field and 40.0% from three-point range.

== Career statistics ==
Legend
GP	Games played	GS	Games started	MPG	Minutes per game	RPG	Rebounds per game
APG	Assists per game	SPG	Steals per game	BPG	Blocks per game	PPG	Points per game
TO	Turnovers per game	FG%	Field-goal percentage	3P%	3-point field-goal percentage	FT%	Free-throw percentage
**Bold**	Career best	°	League leader

=== WNBA ===
==== Regular season ====
Stats current through end of 2025 season

WNBA regular season statistics
Year	Team	GP	GS	MPG	FG%	3P%	FT%	RPG	APG	SPG	BPG	TO	PPG
2016	Indiana	**34**	8	20.0	.361	.294	.911	1.7	1.4	0.9	0.1	1.6	8.6
2017	Indiana	27	9	24.9	.349	.246	.922	3.2	1.4	**1.1**	**0.2**	1.5	10.3
2018	Indiana	**34**	20	25.6	.371	.267	.835	3.1	2.3	0.9	**0.2**	1.4	9.1
2019	Indiana	33	14	25.2	.381	.290	.892	2.9	2.2	0.6	0.1	1.7	9.7
2020	Indiana	19	11	26.4	.346	.233	**.951**	**3.4**	**2.6**	0.6	0.1	2.4	**12.7**
2021	Indiana	28	**25**	**27.3**	.421	.255	.880	2.9	2.0	0.6	0.0	1.9	12.0
2022	Indiana	34	8	16.3	**.451**	.387	.865	1.2	1.2	0.8	0.1	0.9	6.5
2023	Minnesota	33	21	23.1	.404	.289	.833	2.3	2.3	0.5	0.1	2.1	7.3
2024	Connecticut	24	0	16.3	.349	.250	.783	1.5	0.8	0.5	0.0	0.6	4.9
2025	Las Vegas	16	2	13.1	.390	.308	.793	1.8	0.4	0.4	**0.2**	0.9	3.7
2025	Seattle	23	1	13.0	.393	**.412**	.667	0.6	0.2	0.3	**0.2**	**0.4**	2.9
**Career**	10 years, 5 teams	305	118	21.4	.382	.280	.874	2.2	1.6	0.7	0.1	1.4	8.1

==== Playoffs ====
WNBA playoff statistics
Year	Team	GP	GS	MPG	FG%	3P%	FT%	RPG	APG	SPG	BPG	TO	PPG
2016	Indiana	1	0	10.0	.200	.000	—	0.0	0.0	0.0	0.0	1.0	2.0
2023	Minnesota	**3**	**3**	**21.7**	**.417**	**.500**	—	**3.3**	**3.7**	**0.3**	0.0	2.3	3.7
2024	Connecticut	Did not play (illness)											
2025	Seattle	1	0	12.0	.500	.000	**1.000**	1.0	2.0	0.0	0.0	**0.0**	**6.0**
**Career**	3 years, 3 teams	5	3	17.4	.381	.200	1.000	2.2	2.6	0.2	0.0	1.6	3.8

=== College ===
NCAA statistics
Year	Team	GP	GS	MPG	FG%	3P%	FT%	RPG	APG	SPG	BPG	TO	PPG
2012–13	South Carolina	33	30	28.1	.379	.367	.613	5.1	1.3	1.3	0.1	2.5	9.2
2013–14	South Carolina	34	34	**31.4**	.493	**.541**	.793	**5.6**	**3.5**	**1.8**	0.2	2.9	**15.5**
2014–15	South Carolina	**37**	**37**	29.9	**.500**	.416	**.838**	3.1	2.9	1.8	**0.3**	**2.2**	14.4
2015–16	South Carolina	35	34	29.9	.415	.339	.816	2.7	2.6	1.8	0.2	2.5	14.9
**Career**		139	135	30.5	.449	.399	.773	4.1	2.6	1.7	0.2	2.5	13.6
