= Maxuella Lisowa-Mbaka =

Belgian basketball player (born 2001)

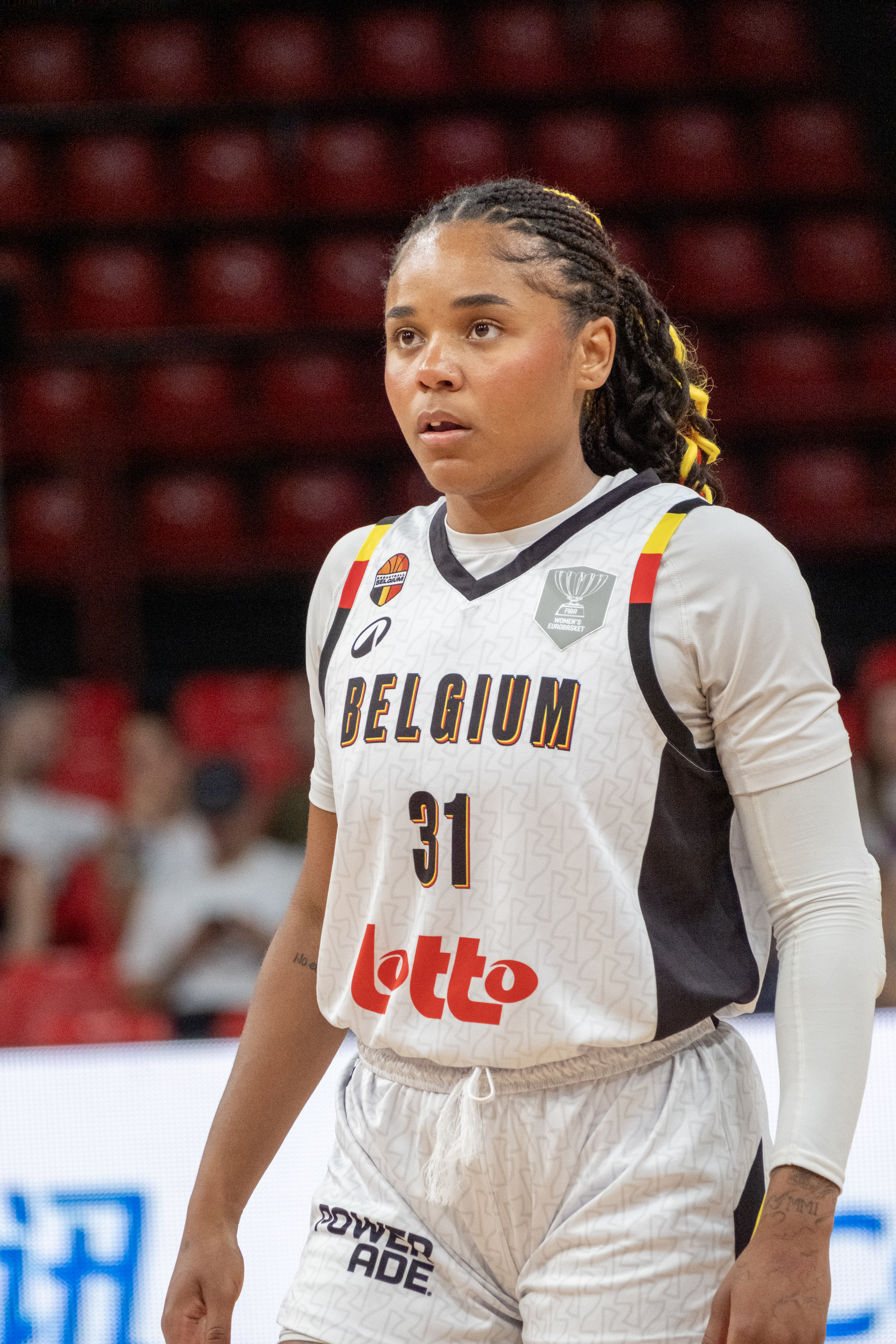
- Lisowa-Mbaka with Belgium during 2025 EuroBasket

No. 31 – Crvena zvezda
- Position: Small forward
- League: First Women's Basketball League of Serbia

Personal information
- Born: 14 May 2001 (age 25)

Career history
- 2019–22: Castors Braine
- 2022: Elsic Fribourg
- 2022–23: Elitzur Ramla
- 2023: Le Mura Lucca
- 2023–24: ESB Villeneuve-d'Ascq
- 2024–25: Araski AES
- 2025–: Rapid Bucharest

Career highlights
- Belgian League: 2020; Belgian Cup: 2020; Israeli Premier League: 2023; Winner Cup: 2023; FIBA EuroBasket champion (2023, 2025); French League: 2024

Maxuella Lisowa-Mbaka (born 14 May 2001) is a Belgian basketball player, and 3x3 basketball player. She plays small forward for the Belgium women's national basketball team.

== Career ==
She represented Belgium at the 2017 FIBA 3x3 U18 Europe Cup. She competed at the 2022 FIBA Women's Basketball World Cup. She took part in the EuroBasket Women 2023 with Belgium who won their first title. Two years later, she took part in the EuroBasket Women 2025 with Belgium winning their second title, continuing their winning streak.

She played for Elizur Landco Ramla and Le Mura Lucca. In June 2024, she announced her transfer to Spanish side Araski. On 20 August 2025, she signed for Crvena zvezda.

== Honours ==
=== Club ===
==== Castors Braine ====
- Belgian League: 2019-20
- Belgian Cup: 2020

==== Elitzur Ramla ====
- Israeli Premier League: 2022–23
- Winner Cup: 2023

==== ESB Villeneuve-d'Ascq ====
- French League: 2024

=== National team ===
- EuroBasket Women: (gold) 2023, 2025
- Belgian Sports team of the Year: 2023, 2025
