= Gordon McKernan =

American attorney

- Born: Gordon J. McKernan
- Education: Juris Doctor
- Alma mater: Loyola University New Orleans College of Law
- Occupation: Attorney
- Years active: 1992—present
- Known for: Gordon McKernan Injury Attorneys (founder)
- Spouse: Shannon McKernan
- Children: 4

Gordon McKernan is an American attorney known as the owner of a Louisiana-based injury law firm, Gordon McKernan Injury Attorneys.

== Early life and education ==
McKernan received his bachelor's from Louisiana State University in 1989. Later, he received his Juris Doctor from Loyola University in 1992.

== Career ==
McKernan started his career at McKernan Law Firm which was founded by his father in the late 1980s. Its name was later changed to Gordon McKernan Injury Attorneys. He is the owner and CEO of the firm. His major areas of practise include personal injury claims including drunk driving crashes, commercial vehicle collisions, vehicle rollovers, and personal injury cases.

McKernan collaborated with LSU Tigers women's basketball coach Kim Mulkey and players Alexis Morris and Angel Reese in the "Playing for a Purpose" campaign, aimed to raise funds for Turner Syndrome awareness and research. He also collaborated with Martha Gottwald and Kim Mulkey on a shopping spree campaign to raise funds for the same cause.

He became notable in the LSU football program's Name, Image, Likeness (NIL) domain when he signed agreements with 15 players and allocating funds for marketing initiatives throughout 2022 season. Gordon McKernan influenced NIL by finalizing agreements with sports figures such as Mikaylah Williams, Kayshon Boutte, and Harold Perkins. He supported cancer organizations in Louisiana through the "Playing for Pink" campaign, in which student-athletes from LSU, Louisiana Ragin Cajuns, and Louisiana Tech earned funds for local cancer groups based on their in-game performances.

In 2017, his firm Gordon McKernan Injury Attorneys launched a fundraiser campaign to raise $75,000 for veterans and commemorated Veterans Day with a flag-raising ceremony, honoring veterans and presenting donations to the Fisher House Foundation from Louisiana residents and the law firm. The firm also donates hundreds of bicycles each year on Christmas.

== Selected publications ==
Some of his selected publications include:

- Special Tools for Selecting the Right Jury, National Business Institute, Winning Strategies for Jury Selection in Louisiana, June, 1998
- Planning Voir Dire, National Business Institute, Winning Strategies for Jury Selection in Louisiana, June, 1998
- Update of the Wrongful Death Law, Louisiana Trial Lawyers Association, Updates and Winning with the Masters, December, 1996
- Overview of the Wrongful Death Law, Louisiana Trial Lawyers Association, Post-legislative Retreat, July, 1996
- Overview and Update of Wrongful Death Law, National Business Institute, June, 1996
- Trial of the Wrongful Death Case, National Business Institute, June, 1996

== Personal life ==
Gordon has been married to Shannon McKernan since 1991, and the couple has four children.
