= LaDazhia Williams =

Basketball player (born 1998)

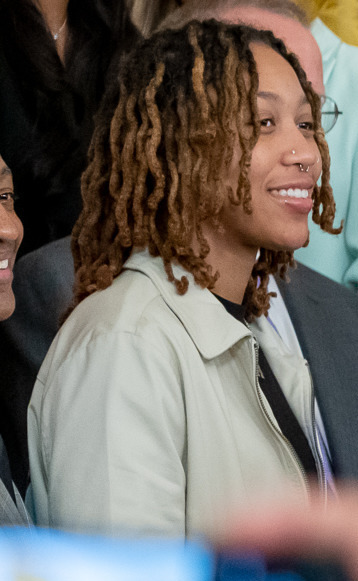
- Williams in 2023

No. 44 – Panathlitikos
- Position: Forward
- League: Greek Women's Basketball League

Personal information
- Born: September 13, 1998 (age 28) Bradenton, Florida
- Listed height: 6 ft 4 in (1.93 m)

Career information
- High school: Lakewood Ranch High School
- College: South Carolina (2017–19); Missouri (2019–22); LSU (2022–23)
- WNBA draft: 2023: 2nd round, 17th overall pick
- Drafted by: Indiana Fever
- Playing career: 2023–present

Career history
- 2023–2024: Saint-Amand Hainaut Basket
- 2024: Santas del Potosi
- 2024–present: Panathlitikos

Career highlights
- NCAA champion (2023)
- Stats at WNBA.com
- Stats at Basketball Reference

LaDazhia Williams (born September 13, 1998) is an American professional basketball player for Panathlitikos of the Greek Women's Basketball League. She played college basketball for the South Carolina Gamecocks, the Missouri Tigers and the LSU Tigers.

== Early life ==
Williams was born in Bradenton, Florida, to Chanel Griffin and an unnamed father. She attended Samoset Elementary School in Bradenton and graduated from Lakewood Ranch High School in Manatee County, Florida, in 2017.

She majored in criminal justice at the University of South Carolina (USC) and psychology at the University of Missouri (UM). She graduated with a Bachelor's degree in psychology at Missouri, and completed a Master's degree in sociology/criminal justice at LSU.

== High school career ==
At Lakewood Ranch High School, Williams is the all-time leading scorer and rebounder in program history. She was ranked #12 best forward and #48 overall prospect in the class of 2017 nationwide. She was awarded the 8A Player of the Year award by the Florida Association of Basketball Coaches (FABC). She was named to the FABC First-Team All-State three times. She averaged 19.6 points per game, nine rebounds, and three blocks as a senior. As team captain, Williams led her team to the program's first Class 7A state title.

== College career ==
Williams played a total of five seasons in the NCAA: two years at USC, two years at UM, and one final year at Louisiana State University (LSU). In her freshman season of 2017–18, she played in 29 games, including twelve Southeastern Conference (SEC) games and all four NCAA Tournament games. She had a season-high playtime of seventeen minutes against Tennessee, scoring three rebounds and three points.

In the 2018–19 season, she played in 19 out of 33 games, scoring 30 points with a 1.6 points per game average. She had a career-high of eight rebounds in the match against Appalachian State.

Due to NCAA transfer rules, Williams had to sit out for the 2019–20 season, along with being impacted by the COVID-19 pandemic. In the 2020–21 season, she played in 21 games and started in 18. She averaged 12.4 points, 4.2 rebounds, and 1.2 blocks, at 23.3 minutes of playtime per game. She had a 58.2% shot rate (106 of 182), which ranked her third of all-time at Mizzou, second in the SEC and ninth nationally for the season. She set career highs with averages of 12.4 points, 4.2 rebounds, and 26 blocks.

In the 2021–22 season, Williams' senior season, she started in nine games and played in 27. She averaged 9.1 points and 4.1 rebounds with 18.7 minutes of playtime. She had a shot rate of 54.3% from the field, ranking ninth in all-time program history at Mizzou.

In her fifth-year graduate season at LSU (2022–23), Williams started in 34 games, averaging 9.9 points per game. She had a career-high of six rebounds and scored four double-doubles throughout the season. Throughout LSU's NCAA Tournament run, she averaged 13.8 points and 5.5 rebounds, with 20 points and 5 rebounds in the final game.

== Professional career ==
Williams was selected in the 2nd round, as the 17th overall draft pick of the 2023 WNBA draft by the Indiana Fever. She is the 21st LSU player to be drafted in the WNBA. She was waived from the team in May 2023, after the Fever lost in a preseason match against the Chicago Sky.

After being waived, Williams moved to Israel to play for Hapoel Petah Tikva of the Israeli Female Basketball Premier League in September. However, she evacuated from Israel back to her home in Georgia in October due to the Gaza war.

In November 2023, it was announced that Williams would be playing for Saint-Amand Hainaut Basket in the Ligue Féminine de Basketball in Saint-Amand-les-Eaux, Nord, France. She made the transfer with her teammate from LSU, Alexis Morris.

In summer 2024, Williams played in Mexico for Santas del Potosi.

In December 2024, Williams joined Panathlitikos of the Greek Women's Basketball League.

== Coaching ==
Williams joined the 2026–27 Rutgers Scarlet Knights women's basketball team in her first coaching role after playing professionally.
