= Evina Westbrook =

American basketball player (born 1998)

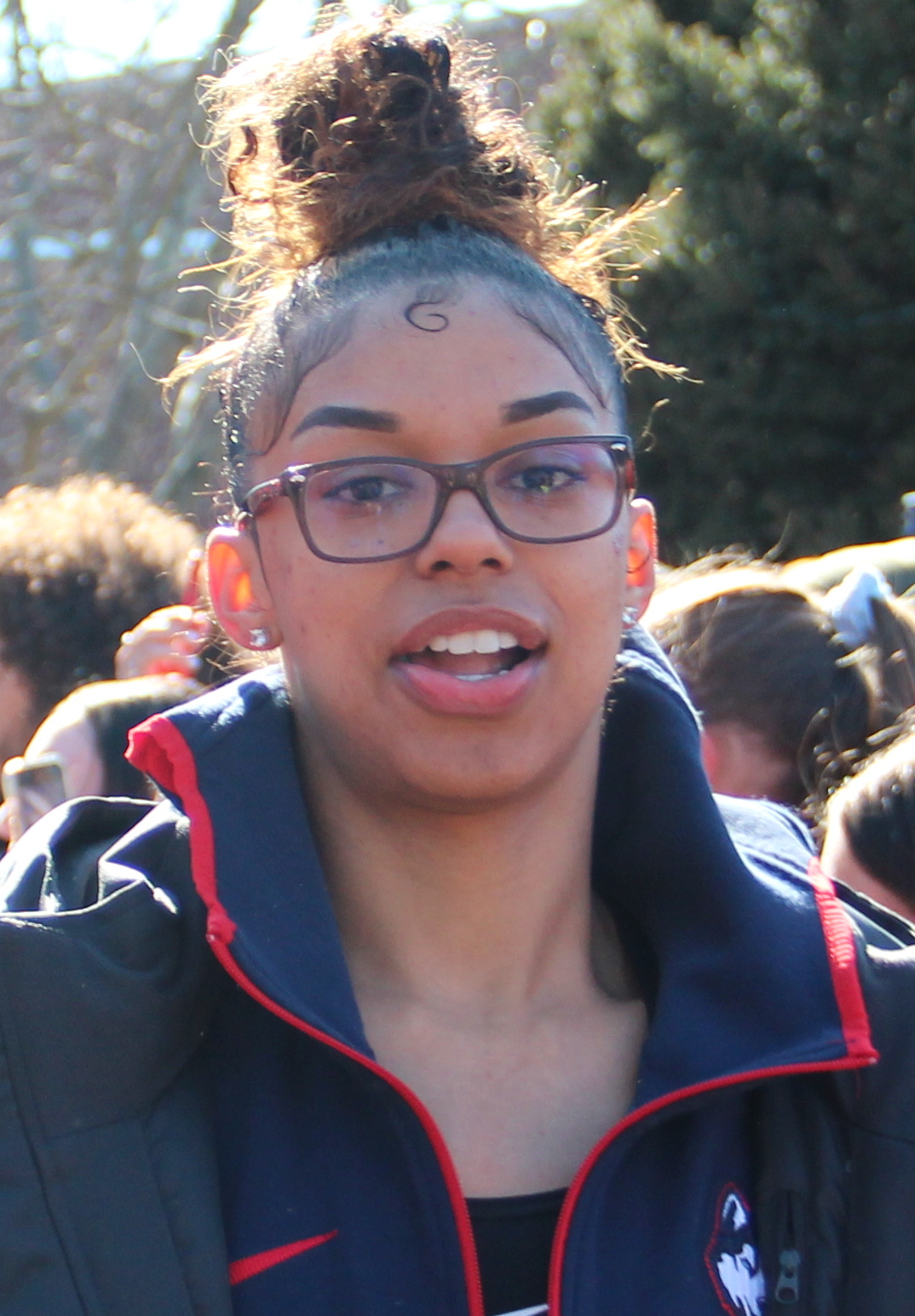
- Westbrook in 2022

Personal information
- Born: September 28, 1998 (age 28) Salem, Oregon, U.S.
- Listed height: 6 ft 0 in (1.83 m)
- Listed weight: 158 lb (72 kg)

Career information
- High school: South Salem (Salem, Oregon)
- College: Tennessee (2017–2019); UConn (2019–2022)
- WNBA draft: 2022: 2nd round, 21st overall pick
- Drafted by: Seattle Storm
- Playing career: 2022–present
- Position: Guard

Career history
- 2022: Minnesota Lynx
- 2022: Washington Mystics
- 2023: Athletes Unlimited
- 2023: Phoenix Mercury
- 2023: Los Angeles Sparks
- 2025: Athletes Unlimited
- 2025–present: Hapoel Beer Sheva

Career highlights
- SEC All-Freshman Team (2018); Morgan Wootten Player of the Year (2017); McDonald's All-American (2017)
- Stats at Basketball Reference
Medals
Women's basketball
Representing the United States
FIBA Under-18 World Cup
Gold medal – first place	2016 Chile	Team

Evina Westbrook (born September 28, 1998) is an American professional basketball player who played for Hapoel Beer Sheva from Israeli League. She most recently played for the Phoenix Mercury of the Women's National Basketball Association (WNBA). She played college basketball at UConn and Tennessee. She was selected in the 2nd Round of the 2022 WNBA draft by the Seattle Storm. During her time in the WNBA, Westbrook has played for the Minnesota Lynx and the Washington Mystics.

== College career ==
=== Tennessee ===
Westbrook came out of high school in 2017 as the #2 overall recruit according to ESPN HoopGurlz. That year she received the Morgan Wootten Player of the Year. Westbrook chose to continue her basketball career at Tennessee.

During her freshman season, Westbrook averaged 8.4 points, 4.3 assists, and 2.8 rebounds, while also starting every game. Her assist average was the second most by a Volunteer freshman. She recorded 12 assists in a game vs. Troy, which placed her 7th in the Tennessee record books and also tied a freshman record. Westbrook was named to the SEC All-Freshman Team.

During her sophomore season, Westbrook was named to the SEC Preseason Coaches All-SEC Second Team, Women's Citizens Naismith Trophy Preseason Watch List, and Nancy Lieberman Award Preseason Watch List. Westbrook averaged 14.9 points and 5.3 assists during the year.

Following the season, Westbrook announced that she would enter the transfer portal. She announced that she would be transferring to Connecticut.

=== Connecticut ===
Westbrook sat out the 2019–20 season due to the NCAA transfer rules. While sitting out, she underwent left knee surgery.

During her redshirt junior season, Westbrook started in all 30 games. She averaged 9.4 points, 5.3 rebounds, and 4.3 assists. She scored a season-high 17 points against Villanova on December 22, 2020. Following the season, Westbrook announced on Instagram that she had "unfinished business" and that she was going to be returning to UConn instead of entering the 2021 WNBA draft.

In her final season, Westbrook bounced in and out of the starting lineup. She stayed consistent in her stats, averaging 9.0 points and 3.1 assists. She helped the Huskies to another Big East title and was named to the All-Tournament team. Westbrook also helped guide the Huskies back to another Final Four. She scored 12 points against Stanford in the semi-finals.

After UConn lost the National Championship game, Westbrook announced that she would be entering the 2022 WNBA draft.

== College statistics ==
Year	Team	GP	Points	FG%	3P%	FT%	RPG	APG	SPG	BPG	PPG
2017–18	Tennessee	33	276	.390	.318	.512	2.8	4.3	0.9	0.7	8.4
2018–19	Tennessee	28	463	.419	.380	.721	3.6	5.3	1.6	0.1	14.9
2020–21	UConn	30	283	.454	.339	.778	5.3	4.3	1.7	0.7	9.4
2021–22	UConn	36	323	.433	.305	.704	3.7	3.1	1.4	0.2	9.0
Career		105	1345	.423	.334	.674	3.8	4.2	1.4	0.4	10.3

== Professional career ==
Westbrook was selected 21st overall in the 2nd Round of the 2022 WNBA draft by the Seattle Storm. She competed in their training camp but was waived and did not make their 2022 Opening Night roster.

=== Minnesota Lynx ===
Westbrook was announced as a hardship-exception signing by the Minnesota Lynx on May 12 2022. According to subsequent reporting, the hardship paperwork was never finalized; instead, the Lynx signed her to a standard rest-of-season contract the following day, once they had verified continued roster room under the cap. She dished a season-high five assists on May 14, 2022, against the Chicago Sky, and ultimately appeared in 14 games before being waived on June 24 2022.

=== Washington Mystics ===
On June 27, 2022, Westbrook signed with the Mystics.

Westbrook was waived by the Mystics on May 7, 2023, during the 2023 Training Camp.

=== Phoenix Mercury ===
The Phoenix Mercury claimed Westbrook off waivers on May 9, 2023. She played in 9 games for the Mercury, before she was waived on June 22, 2023.

=== Los Angeles Sparks ===
Westbrook signed a 7-Day hardship contract with the Los Angeles Sparks on July 31, 2023.

=== Overseas ===
On August 20, 2025 Westbrook signed in Hapoel Beer Sheva from Israeli League until the end of the season.

== WNBA career statistics ==
Legend
GP	Games played	GS	Games started	MPG	Minutes per game	RPG	Rebounds per game
APG	Assists per game	SPG	Steals per game	BPG	Blocks per game	PPG	Points per game
TO	Turnovers per game	FG%	Field-goal percentage	3P%	3-point field-goal percentage	FT%	Free-throw percentage
**Bold**	Career best	°	League leader

=== Regular season ===
Year	Team	GP	GS	MPG	FG%	3P%	FT%	RPG	APG	SPG	BPG	TO	PPG
2022	Minnesota	**14**	**2**	**12.4**	.318	.143	.667	**1.4**	**1.4**	**0.4**	**0.4**	0.9	2.6
2022	Washington	6	0	5.3	**.667**	**.500**	.833	0.0	0.5	0.3	0.2	0.5	**3.3**
2023	Phoenix	9	0	8.0	.100	.000	**1.000**	1.0	0.4	0.1	0.1	**0.4**	1.1
2023	Los Angeles	9	0	6.2	.300	.400	**1.000**	0.9	0.7	0.2	0.2	0.7	1.1
Career	2 years, 4 teams	38	2	8.8	.301	.194	.826	1.0	0.9	0.3	0.3	0.7	2.0
