= Tamara James =

American basketball player (born 1984)

Personal information
- Born: June 13, 1984 (age 42) Dania, Florida, U.S.
- Listed height: 5 ft 10 in (1.78 m)
- Listed weight: 160 lb (73 kg)

Career information
- High school: South Broward (Hollywood, Florida)
- College: Miami (Florida) (2002–2006)
- WNBA draft: 2006: 1st round, 8th overall pick
- Drafted by: Washington Mystics
- Playing career: 2006–2007
- Position: Small forward

Career history
- 2006–2007: Washington Mystics

Career highlights
- 2x First-team All-ACC (2005, 2006); First-team All-Big East (2004); Big East All-Freshman Team (2003)
- Stats at Basketball Reference

Tamara James (born June 13, 1984) is an American basketball former player, formerly of the WNBA's Washington Mystics. She is an alumna of the University of Miami, where she majored in liberal arts with a concentration in theater studies. James was selected by the Mystics in the first round, the eighth overall pick in the 2006 WNBA draft. James spent 9 years as a professional basketball player, mostly in Israel. In Israel, James won 2 Cup Championships and 1 League Championship Wite Maccabi Bnot Ashdod. She had a son in 2011. On 2014 she played for Elitzur Ramla and won Championships.

On November 8, 2016, James was elected Mayor of Dania Beach, the oldest community in Broward County, Florida.

== Career statistics ==
Legend
GP	Games played	GS	Games started	MPG	Minutes per game	RPG	Rebounds per game
APG	Assists per game	SPG	Steals per game	BPG	Blocks per game	PPG	Points per game
TO	Turnovers per game	FG%	Field-goal percentage	3P%	3-point field-goal percentage	FT%	Free-throw percentage
**Bold**	Career best	°	League leader

=== WNBA ===
==== Regular season ====
Year	Team	GP	GS	MPG	FG%	3P%	FT%	RPG	APG	SPG	BPG	TO	PPG
2006	Washington	21	0	7.4	38.8	25.0	**88.9**	0.8	0.1	0.2	0.1	**0.5**	2.7
2007	Washington	**31**	**9**	**12.9**	38.8	**36.0**	84.9	**1.6**	1.1	**0.8**	0.1	0.9	**5.4**
Career	2 years, 1 team	52	9	10.7	38.8	33.9	85.9	1.3	0.7	0.6	0.1	0.7	4.3

=== College ===
Legend
GP	Games played	GS	Games started	MPG	Minutes per game
FG%	Field goal percentage	3P%	3-point field goal percentage	FT%	Free throw percentage
RPG	Rebounds per game	APG	Assists per game	SPG	Steals per game
BPG	Blocks per game	PPG	Points per game	**Bold**	Career high

Year	Team	GP	Points	FG%	3P%	FT%	RPG	APG	SPG	BPG	PPG
2002–03	Miami (Florida)	**31**	**650**	**51.6**	32.8	76.0	**7.9**	1.6	1.8	0.5	21.0
2003–04	Miami (Florida)	28	464	50.0	37.9	76.6	4.6	**2.6**	2.0	**0.6**	16.6
2004–05	Miami (Florida)	29	647	48.0	32.8	77.0	6.9	2.0	2.6	0.4	**22.3**°
2005–06	Miami (Florida)	30	645	48.6	**38.7**	**83.0**	7.8	2.3	**3.1**	0.4	21.5°
Career	Miami (Florida)	118	2406	49.5	36.0	78.3	6.8	2.1	2.4	0.5	20.4
