= Brasheedah Elohim =

American-Israeli basketball and tennis player

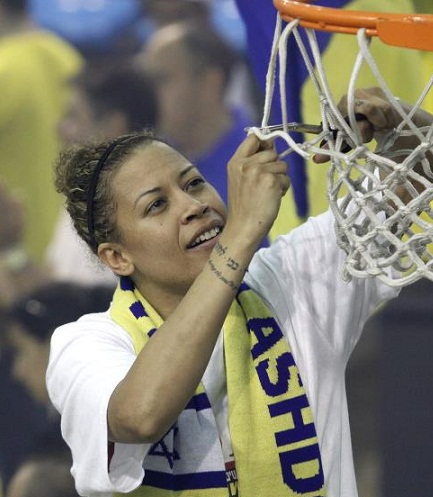
- Elohim cuts the net after her team wins the 2012 championship

Personal information
- Born: November 1, 1980 (age 46) Virgin Islands
- Listed height: 5 ft 11 in (1.80 m)

Career information
- High school: Onteora High School
- College: University of Maryland Eastern Shore (2000–2002); Fayetteville State University (2002–2004)
- Playing career: 2007–2016
- Position: Power forward

Career history
- 2007–2008: Elitzur Ramla
- 2008–2009: Maccabi Bnot Ashdod
- 2009–2010: A.S.A. Jerusalem
- 2010–2011: Raanana Herzliya
- 2011–2012: Maccabi Bnot Ashdod
- 2012–2015: A.S. Ramat HaSharon

Brasheedah Elohim (Hebrew: בראשידה אלוהים; born November 1, 1980) is an American-Israeli basketball player and tennis player. During her professional women's basketball career in Israel, she played for Ramat HaSharon, Ashdod, Ramla, and Jerusalem. She was a member of the 2016 Israel women's national basketball team.

== Biography ==
Brasheedah Elohim was born in the Virgin Islands and grew up in Mount Tremper, New York. She was raised Jewish. Her mother changed the family's surname to Elohim (Hebrew for "God") because she did not want her children to carry "the name of a slave". (Note: When Elohim began her professional career in Israel, local media had a field day with her Hebrew surname, declaring, "God has arrived in Israel", and, "God is a woman".)

Elohim attended Onteora High School in Boiceville, New York, where she was one of the few girls' basketball players to score more than 1,000 points in her high school career.

== University ==
From 2000 to 2002 she attended the University of Maryland Eastern Shore in Princess Anne, Maryland, where she was a substitute player for the university's Division 1 basketball team. She averaged 7.4 points per game in 2000–2001 and 10.8 points per game in 2001–2002. She then moved to Fayetteville State University (FSU) in Fayetteville, North Carolina, where she was a starting guard for the Division 2 Lady Broncos team from 2002 to 2004. Averaging 12.3 points per game, she had a career total of 687 points.

Elohim was also a player on the FSU tennis team from 2003 to 2004, compiling a 46–2 record. In 2003 she won the CIAA doubles championship, but lost in the finals of the parallel doubles championship. In 2004 she won the CIAA First Singles final and was named Most Outstanding Women's Tennis Player; that year, FSU won the CIAA Women's Tennis Championship.

=== Maryland, Eastern Shore and Fayetteville State statistics ===
Legend
GP	Games played	GS	Games started	MPG	Minutes per game
FG%	Field goal percentage	3P%	3-point field goal percentage	FT%	Free throw percentage
RPG	Rebounds per game	APG	Assists per game	SPG	Steals per game
BPG	Blocks per game	PPG	Points per game	**Bold**	Career high

Year	Team	GP	Points	FG%	3P%	FT%	RPG	APG	SPG	BPG	PPG
1999-00	Maryland, Eastern Shore	22	164	**44.6%**	**33.3%**	62.2%	5.0	0.9	1.4	0.2	7.5
2000-01	Maryland, Eastern Shore	26	282	32.5%	22.9%	58.7%	7.1	**2.3**	2.0	0.3	10.8
2001-02	Fayetteville State	**28**	**370**	40.6%	25.0%	**68.0%**	**7.6**	1.1	**2.3**	**0.6**	**13.2**
2002-03	Fayetteville State	**28**	317	38.6%	25.0%	65.9%	6.5	0.9	1.9	0.5	11.3
Career		104	1133	38.2%	24.8%	64.2%	6.6	1.3	1.9	0.4	10.9

== Post-college ==
In 2005 Elohim played in the Women's Blue Chip Basketball League as one of the starting five players for the Jonesboro Flames. She was named to the 2005 WBCBL All-Star Game. In 2006 she played for the Atlanta Flames. In May 2007, she was a guest player for A.S. Ramat HaSharon in an exhibition game against the Washington Mystics.

== Professional career ==
In 2007 Elohim immigrated to Israel and received Israeli citizenship under the Law of Return. She signed with Elitzur Ramla for the 2007–2008 season. Although she did not distinguish herself during the season, she came off the bench during the fourth game in the best-of-five EuroCup semifinals with A.S. Ramat HaSharon and scored a season-high 11 points and five rebounds, helping Ramla beat Ramat HaSharon 87–74 and forcing a fifth game.

For the 2008–2009 season she signed with Maccabi Bnot Ashdod. In 2009–2010 she played with A.S.A. Jerusalem, and in 2010–2011 was a member of Raanana Hertzliya. For the 2011–2012 season she played with Maccabi Bnot Ashdod. In 2012 she moved to A.S. Ramat HaSharon, where she played through 2015. Her manager on the latter team lauded her as a veteran presence for younger players. In the 2013–2014 season she averaged 4 points, 5 rebounds, and 1.5 assists per game.

== Awards ==
Elohim was part of the Israel Cup-winning team in 2008 and 2012. In 2013 she was an Israeli Super Cup finalist.
