= Alexis Peterson =

American basketball player (born 1995)

Alexis Peterson-Smalls
- Alexis Peterson

Personal information
- Born: June 20, 1995 (age 31) Columbus, Ohio, U.S.
- Listed height: 5 ft 5 in (1.65 m)
- Listed weight: 139 lb (63 kg)

Career information
- High school: Northland (Columbus, Ohio)
- College: Syracuse (2013–2017)
- WNBA draft: 2017: 2nd round, 15th overall pick
- Drafted by: Seattle Storm
- Playing career: 2017–present
- Position: Guard

Career history
- 2017: Seattle Storm
- 2017–2019: Hapoel Petah Tikva
- 2019–2020: AZS Lublin
- 2020–2021: Maccabi Bnot Ashdod
- 2021–2023: Union Féminine Angers Basket 49
- 2023–2024: Basket Landes
- 2024: CCC Polkowice
- 2025: Beşiktaş

Career highlights
- WBCA Coaches' Association (2017); Second-team All-American – AP (2017); ACC Player of the Year (2017); 2× First-team All-ACC (2016, 2017); 3× All-ACC Defensive Team (2015–2017)
- Stats at WNBA.com
- Stats at Basketball Reference

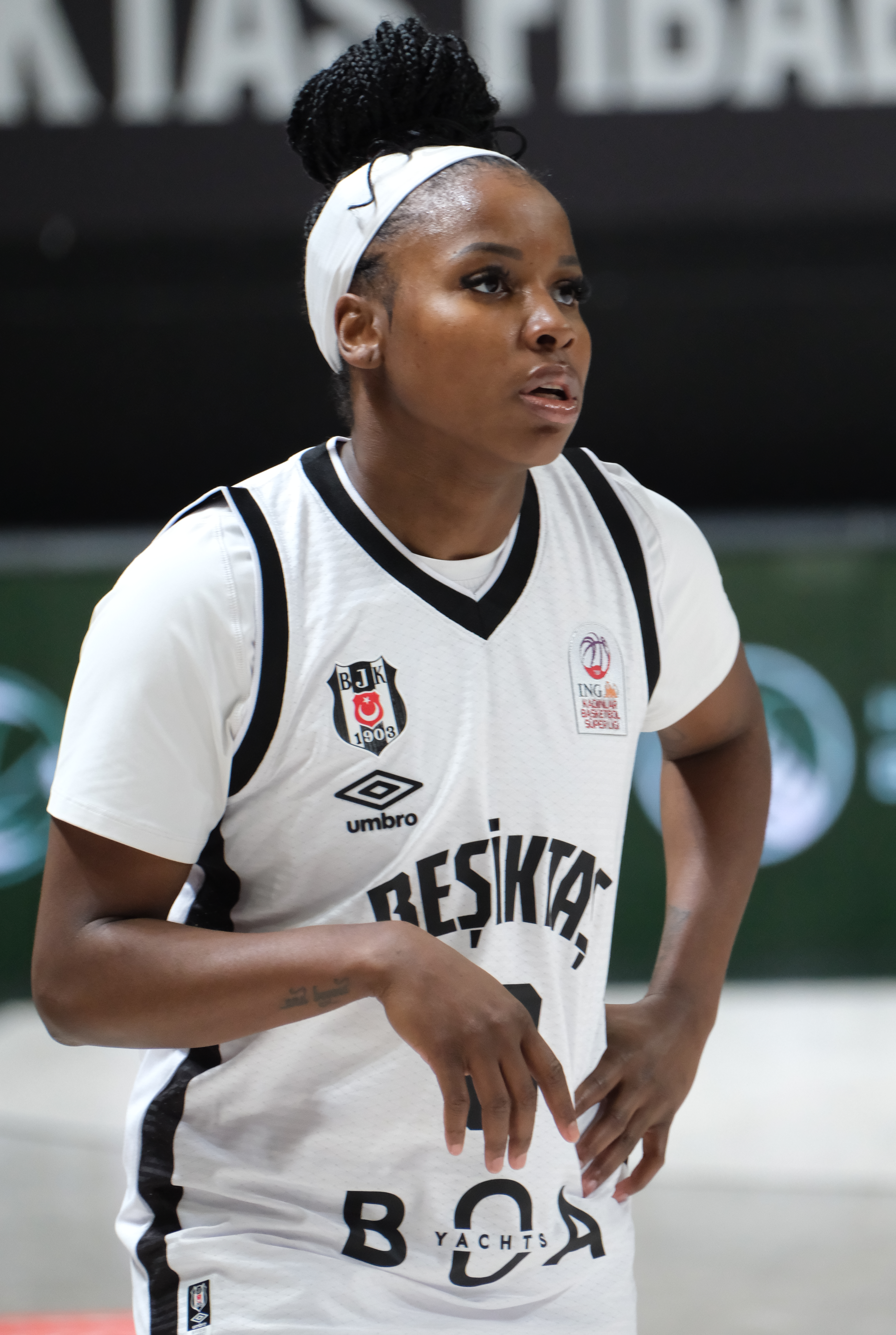
Peterson-Smalls with Beşiktaş in 2025

Alexis Ganay Peterson-Smalls (born Alexis Ganay Peterson; June 20, 1995) is an American-German basketball combo guard who last played for Beşiktaş of the Turkish Super League. A former ACC Player of the Year at Syracuse, she was drafted by the Seattle Storm with the 15th overall pick of the 2017 WNBA draft. She played for the German national basketball team at the 2024 Olympics in Paris.

== Professional career ==
=== WNBA ===
==== Seattle Storm ====
Peterson was drafted by the Seattle Storm in the second round (15th overall) of the 2017 WNBA draft. Spending one season with the Storm as the team's backup point guard, she was waived after the team drafted Jordin Canada in 2018.

==== Indiana Fever ====
Peterson signed a training camp contract with the Indiana Fever in 2018, but did not make the roster.

==== Phoenix Mercury ====
Peterson signed a training camp contract with the Phoenix Mercury in 2018, but did not make the roster.

==== Las Vegas Aces ====
Peterson signed a training camp contract with the Las Vegas Aces on February 1, 2023. She played in one preseason game, but was eventually waived on May 14, 2023.

=== Overseas ===
Peterson played overseas in the Israeli Ligat ha'Al for Hapoel Petah Tikva and Maccabi Bnot Ashdod, in the Polish Basket Liga Kobiet for AZS Lublin and CCC Polkowice, in the French Ligue Féminine de Basketball for Union Féminine Angers Basket 49 and Basket Landes, and in the Turkish Super League for Beşiktaş.

=== German National Team ===
Peterson played in the German national team at the 2024 Olympics in Paris. 2026 she played in the German national Team at the Basketball-World-Cup in Berlin. The team reached the Semifinals and finished at the 4th place.

== Career statistics ==
Legend
GP	Games played	GS	Games started	MPG	Minutes per game	RPG	Rebounds per game
APG	Assists per game	SPG	Steals per game	BPG	Blocks per game	PPG	Points per game
TO	Turnovers per game	FG%	Field-goal percentage	3P%	3-point field-goal percentage	FT%	Free-throw percentage
**Bold**	Career best	°	League leader

=== College ===
Year	Team	GP	GS	MPG	FG%	3P%	FT%	RPG	APG	SPG	BPG	TO	PPG
2013–14	Syracuse	32	1	12.3	.400	.211	.727	1.0	1.7	0.8	0.0	**1.1**	3.0
2014–15	Syracuse	32	32	33.3	**.432**	**.385**	.748	**3.7**	4.1	2.4	0.0	2.7	16.2
2015–16	Syracuse	**37**	**37**	32.1	.413	.308	.747	2.7	4.7	2.1	**0.1**	2.9	16.0
2016–17	Syracuse	33	33	**35.6**	.423	.369	**.798**	3.5	**7.0**	**3.0**	**0.1**	3.3	**23.4**°
**Career**		134	103	28.5	.421	.347	.764	2.7	4.4	2.1	0.0	2.5	14.8

=== WNBA ===
Year	Team	GP	GS	MPG	FG%	3P%	FT%	RPG	APG	SPG	BPG	TO	PPG
2017	Seattle	17	0	7.1	.295	.250	1.000	1.2	0.8	0.2	0.0	0.7	2.1
