= 2017 McDonald's All-American Girls Game =

East	West
80	74
- Date: March 29, 2017
- Venue: United Center, Chicago, Illinois
- MVP: Rellah Boothe
- Network: ESPN2

McDonald's All-American

The 2017 McDonald's All-American Girls Game is an All-Star basketball game that was played on March 29, 2017, at the United Center in Chicago, Illinois, home of the Chicago Bulls. The game's rosters featured the best and most highly recruited high school girls graduating in 2017. The game is the 16th annual version of the McDonald's All-American Game first played in 2002.

== 2017 Game ==
The East won the game in overtime, 80–74. They had to overcome a 13-point deficit in the game to force the game into overtime after tying the score at 69 in regulation. Rellah Boothe - the Game MVP - hit huge consecutive 3-pointers to push the East. Boothe had 18 points, 9 rebounds, and 2 blocks.

The West jumped out early due to some heady guard play from Alexis Morris and then tried to keep the lead and make a comeback in overtime with the post play of Loretta Kakala. Kakala finished with 11 points, 6 rebounds, and 2 steals.

=== 2017 East Roster ===
ESPNW 100 Rank	Name	Height	Position	Hometown	High school	College choice
39	Janelle Bailey	6–3	C	Charlotte, North Carolina	Providence Day	North Carolina
3	Rellah Boothe	6–1	F	Ocala, Florida	IMG Academy	Texas
13	Mikayla Combs	5–10	G	Buford, Georgia	Wesleyan School	UConn
12	Rennia Davis	6–2	F	Jacksonville, Florida	Jean Ribault High School	Tennessee
11	Maya Dodson	6–3	F	Alpharetta, Georgia	St. Francis School	Stanford
9	Dana Evans	5–6	G	Gary, Indiana	West Side Leadership Academy	Louisville
	Raven Farley-Clark	6–3	C	Elizabeth, New Jersey	Queen of Peace High School	LSU
7	Anastasia Hayes	5–7	G	Murfreesboro, Tennessee	Riverdale High School	Tennessee
57	Kasiyahna Kushkituah	6–4	C	Atlanta, Georgia	St. Francis Schools	Tennessee
4	Chasity Patterson	5–6	G	Houston, Texas	North Shore Senior High School	Texas
30	Danielle Patterson	6–3	C	Brooklyn, New York	The Mary Louis Academy	Notre Dame
1	Megan Walker	6–1	G	Chesterfield, Virginia	Monacan High School	UConn

=== 2017 West Roster ===
ESPNW 100 Rank	Name	Height	Position	Hometown	High school	College choice
6	Chennedy Carter	5–7	G	Mansfield, Texas	Mansfield Timberview High School	Texas A&M
18	Ayanna Clark	6–1	C	Long Beach, California	Long Beach Polytechnic High School	USC
5	Sidney Cooks	6–4	F	Kenosha, Wisconsin	St. Joseph Catholic Academy	Michigan State
25	Loretta Kakala	6–3	C	Manteca, California	Manteca High School	Louisville
33	Destiny Littleton	5–8	G	La Jolla, California	The Bishop's School	USC
20	Alexis Morris	5–6	G	Beaumont, Texas	Legacy Christian Academy	Baylor
10	Michaela Onyenwere	5–11	F	Aurora, Colorado	Grandview High School	UCLA
19	DiDi Richards	6–1	G	Cypress, Texas	Cypress Ranch High School	Baylor
17	Kianna Smith	6–0	G	Moreno Valley, California	Troy High School	California
2	Evina Westbrook	6–0	G	Salem, Oregon	South Salem High School	Tennessee
14	Jade Williams	6–4	C	The Colony, Texas	The Colony High School	Duke
8	Kiana Williams	5–7	G	San Antonio, Texas	Karen Wagner High School	Stanford

=== Coaches ===
The East team was coached by:

- Head Coach — Laney Clement-Holbrook of Oliver Ames High School (North Easton, Massachusetts)

The West team was coached by:

- Head Coach - Russell L. Ninemire of Sandy Creek High School (Fairfield, Nebraska)

== See also ==
2017 McDonald's All-American Boys Game
