= Alisia Jenkins =

American basketball player (born 1994)

No. 12 – Savannah Steel
- Position: Forward
- League: UpShot League

Personal information
- Born: February 21, 1994 (age 32) Statesboro, Georgia, U.S.
- Listed height: 6 ft 1 in (1.85 m)

Career information
- High school: Statesboro High School (Statesboro, Georgia)
- College: South Florida (2012–2016)
- WNBA draft: 2016: undrafted
- Playing career: 2016–present

Career history
- 2020: Indiana Fever
- 2020: Chicago Sky
- 2020: Phoenix Mercury
- 2022–2023: Ramat Hasharon
- 2026–present: Savannah Steel

Career highlights
- 2× Second-team All-AAC (2014, 2015); Third-team All-AAC (2016); Big East All-Freshman Team (2013)
- Stats at Basketball Reference

Alisia Jenkins (born February 21, 1994) is an American professional basketball player who plays for the Savannah Steel of the UpShot League. She played college basketball at South Florida.

== College career ==
Jenkins came out of high school as the 83rd ranked forward in the 2012 Class per ESPN's HoopGurlz rankings. She committed to play for the South Florida Bulls. She also considered Temple, Marshall, Georgia Southern, and Tennessee Tech.

During her freshman season, Jenkins scored 200 points and grabbed 199 rebounds, and was named to the Big East All-Freshman Team. When South Florida moved from the Big East to the American Athletic Conference, Jenkins continued to make the All-Conference teams. She was a two-time All-Second team during her sophomore and junior seasons, while making the All-Third team during her senior season.

During her senior season, Jenkins also became the USF all-time leader in rebounding - surpassing a record that had stood for 26 years.

== Palmarès ==
=== En club ===
- First Pick All Star Starter Ligue Féminine de Basket : saison 2023-2024

== College statistics ==
Year	Team	GP	Points	FG%	3P%	FT%	RPG	APG	SPG	BPG	PPG
2012–13	South Florida	32	200	.523	.000	.681	6.2	0.6	0.8	0.7	6.3
2013–14	South Florida	36	345	.423	.143	.704	10.3	1.2	1.0	1.1	9.6
2014–15	South Florida	35	448	.538	.000	.770	11.3	0.9	1.6	2.3	12.8
2015–16	South Florida	28	289	.473	.348	.840	11.4	1.3	0.9	0.6	10.3

== Professional career ==
=== WNBA ===
Jenkins went undrafted in the 2016 WNBA draft. She signed a training camp contract with the New York Liberty in 2016, but did not make the roster.

Jenkins made her WNBA debut during the 2020 WNBA season, when she signed with the Indiana Fever. She was waived by the Fever on August 28, 2023. Jenkins signed with the Chicago Sky on a 7-Day Contract 3 days after being waived by the Fever. After her 7-Day Contract was up, Jenkins signed with the Phoenix Mercury.

On February 2, 2023, Jenkins signed a training camp contract with the Washington Mystics. Jenkins was waived during Training Camp and did not make the Mystics roster.

== WNBA career statistics ==
Legend
GP	Games played	GS	Games started	MPG	Minutes per game	RPG	Rebounds per game
APG	Assists per game	SPG	Steals per game	BPG	Blocks per game	PPG	Points per game
TO	Turnovers per game	FG%	Field-goal percentage	3P%	3-point field-goal percentage	FT%	Free-throw percentage
**Bold**	Career best	°	League leader

=== Regular season ===
Year	Team	GP	GS	MPG	FG%	3P%	FT%	RPG	APG	SPG	BPG	TO	PPG
2020	Indiana	1	0	2.0	.000	.000	.000	1.0	0.0	0.0	0.0	0.0	0.0
2020	Chicago	**2**	0	1.5	.000	.000	.000	0.0	0.0	0.0	0.0	0.0	0.0
2020	Phoenix	**2**	0	**11.5**	**.250**	.000	**.667**	**1.5**	0.0	0.0	0.0	1.5	**4.0**
Career	1 year, 3 teams	5	0	5.6	.250	.000	.667	0.8	0.0	0.0	0.0	0.6	1.6
