= Hapoel Lev Jerusalem =

- Leagues: Israeli League
- Founded: 2021; 5 years ago
- Arena: Malha Arena (capacity 2,000)
- Location: Jerusalem, Israel
- Team colors: Red and White
- Head coach: Limor Peleg
- Championships: Israeli State Cup (1)
- Website: https://levjerusalem.club/english/
Home	Away

Hapoel Lev Jerusalem is a professional women's basketball team based in Jerusalem, competing in the Premier League. Founded in 2021, the team first competed in the 3rd tier Liga Artzit. The team gained two league promotions in two seasons and joined the Premier League in 2023. In 2024 the team won the Israeli State Cup.

== History ==
The team was founded by Rebecca Ross and Dr. Netta Abugov. Ross is an American-Israeli professional basketball player, who played for several Israeli Premier League teams. Ross joined the nonprofit organization PeacePlayers International which uses basketball to bridge cultural and social divides and promote peace. For several years, Ross coached amateur and youth teams that integrated Arab and Jewish players. In 2021, Ross teamed up with Dr. Netta Abugov, a former linguistics lecturer at Bar-Ilan University, whose daughter was on a team coached by Ross. They sought to create a professional team and founded Hapoel Lev Jerusalem (lev is the Hebrew word for "heart").

Several players from PeacePlayers teams joined several players recruited by Ross and Abugov from other clubs to create the new team, which hosted games at Havat HaNoar HaTzioni. In the 2021/22 season, Hapoel Lev Jerusalem competed in the 3rd tier Liga Artzit. The team won the league's southern division and was promoted to the 2nd tier National League (Liga Leumit). In the 2022/23 season, the team won the league championship and was promoted to the Premier League. The team also won the Basketball Association cup (the 2nd tier cup competition in Israel).

After gaining promotion to the Premier League, Malcha Arena, formerly the home court of Hapoel Jerusalem B. C., became the team's new home court. In March 2024, Hapoel Lev Jerusalem won the Israeli State Cup after beating Elitzur Ramla in the final. The team also reached the playoff finals, where they lost to Ramla in three games.

In the 2024/25 season, the team was eliminated in the playoff semi-finals by Elitzur Ramla. The team also reached the Cup Final for the second consecutive season, this time losing to Maccabi Bnot Ashdod.

Hapoel Lev Jerusalem finished the 2025/26 season in 9th place and did not qualify for the playoffs.

== Current roster ==
Note: Flags indicate national team eligibility at FIBA-sanctioned events. Players may hold other non-FIBA nationalities not displayed.

Hapoel Jerusalem roster
Players
Coaches

Pos.	No.	Nat.	Name	Ht.	Age
G	1	(United States) (Israel)	Baron, Alyssa (c)	1.78 m (5 ft 10 in)	34 – 16 April 1992
F	3	(United States)	Richardson, Breanna	1.85 m (6 ft 1 in)	31 – 4 August 1994
G	4	(Israel)	Gagola, Noa	1.70 m (5 ft 7 in)	20 – 26 January 2006
PF	6	(Israel)	Kabada, Hodaya	1.77 m (5 ft 10 in)	20 – 29 August 2005
G	7	(Israel)	Kayuf, Noor	1.70 m (5 ft 7 in)	24 – 24 August 2001
G	8	(Israel)	Tirosh, Shir	1.70 m (5 ft 7 in)	26 – 2 June 1999
G	9	(Israel)	Mor Yosef, Hadar	1.73 m (5 ft 8 in)	20 – 13 October 2005
G/F	10	(Israel)	Grinboim, Tamar	1.75 m (5 ft 9 in)	20 – 11 October 2005
SF	18	(United States) (Israel)	Snow, Annette	1.78 m (5 ft 10 in)	31 – 16 November 1994
G	30	(Israel)	Artushas, Karni	1.70 m (5 ft 7 in)	20 – 11 July 2005
G	33	(Israel)	Mayshar, Neta	1.65 m (5 ft 5 in)	19 – 9 December 2006
F	35	(United States)	Carey, Sasha	1.88 m (6 ft 2 in)	30 – 16 November 1995

Head coach

- (Israel) Limor Peleg

Assistant coach(es)

- (Israel) Yonatan Naveh

Team manager

- (Israel) Rebecca Ross

Legend

- (C) Team captain
- (IN) Inactive player
- Injured

- Roster
Updated: May 9, 2024

== Honours ==
- Israeli Female Basketball Premier League:
  - Runners-up (1): 2023–24
- Israeli Women's Basketball Cup:
  - Winners (1): 2023–24
- Israeli Female Basketball National League:
  - Winners (1): 2022–23
- Israeli Basketball Association Cup:
  - Winners (1): 2022–23
