= Jennie Simms =

American-Israeli basketball player (born 1994)

Jennie Simms ג'ני סימס
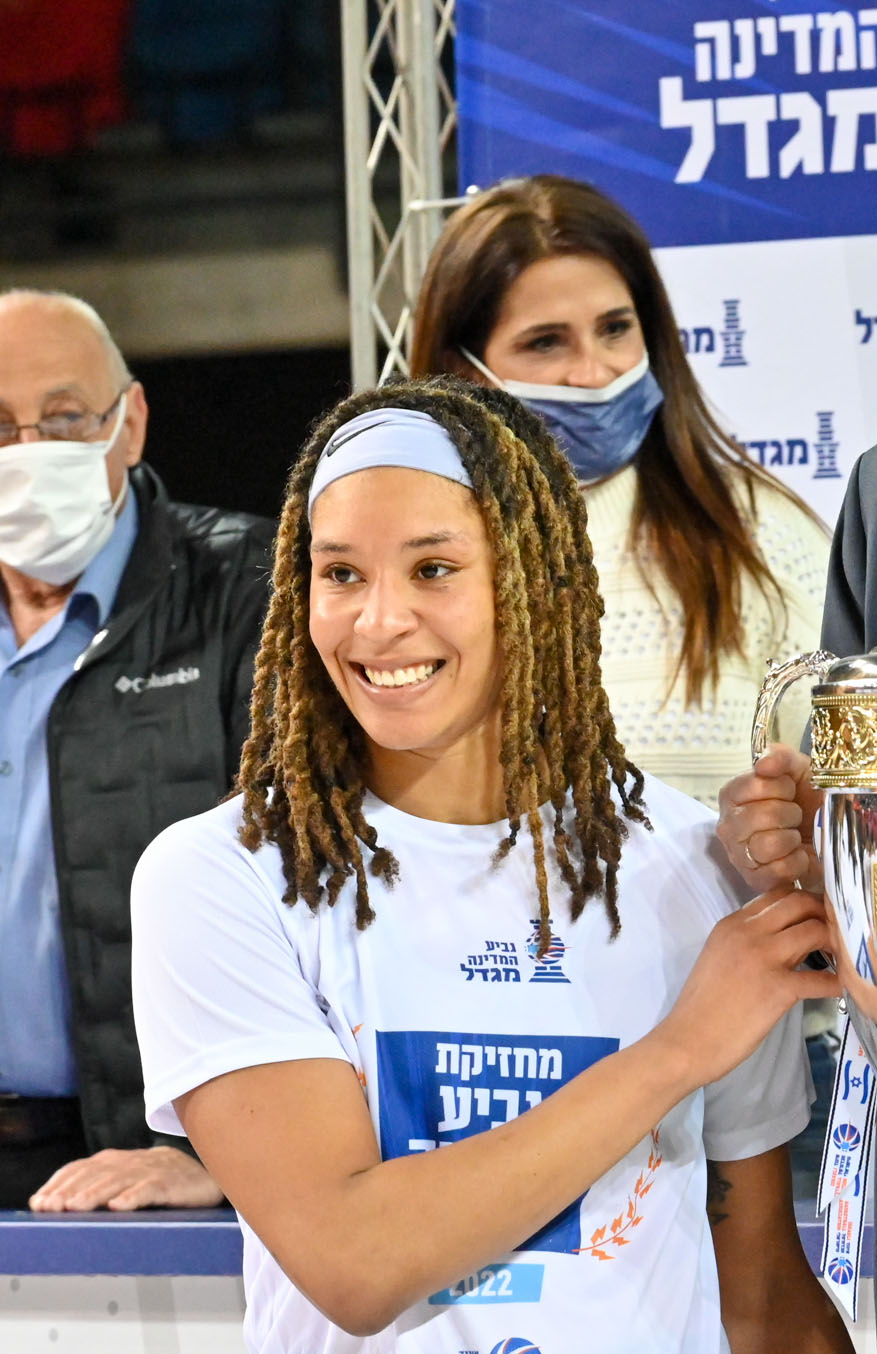

Personal information
- Born: April 21, 1994 (age 32) Accokeek, Maryland, U.S.
- Listed height: 6 ft 0 in (1.83 m)

Career information
- High school: Riverdale Baptist School (Upper Marlboro, Maryland)
- College: West Virginia (2012–2013); Old Dominion (2013–2017)
- WNBA draft: 2017: 2nd round, 18th overall pick
- Drafted by: Washington Mystics
- Playing career: 2017–present
- Position: Guard
- Number: 25

Career history
- 2017: Washington Mystics
- 2017: Indiana Fever
- 2017: Hapoel Petah Tikva
- 2017-2018: Elitzur Ramla
- 2018-2019: Bnei Yehuda Tel Aviv
- 2019-2020: Nissan Al-Qazeres Extremadura
- 2020-2021: A.S. Ramat Hasharon
- 2022-2023: Phoenix Mercury
- 2023: Washington Mystics
- 2023-2026: Elitzur Ramla
- 2026-present: Beşiktaş JK

Career highlights
- AP Honorable Mention All-American (2017); Conference USA Player of the Year (2017); 3× First-team All-Conference USA (2015–2017); Conference USA Newcomer of the Year (2015)
- Stats at Basketball Reference

Jennie Simms (Hebrew: ג'ני סימס; born April 21, 1994) is an American-Israeli professional basketball player who plays for Beşiktaş JK of the Women's Basketball Super League. She played college basketball for 3 seasons at Old Dominion and 1 season at West Virginia. Simms was drafted by the Washington Mystics of the WNBA in the 2017 WNBA draft. She has played for the Mystics, Indiana Fever, and the Phoenix Mercury.

== College career ==
=== West Virginia ===
Simms was rated as the 87th overall incoming recruit by ESNPU HoopGurlz 100 and committed to play for West Virginia. Simms played in 8 games for the Mountaineers during her freshman year and averaged 3.1 points. Her last game was on December 4, 2012. She ultimately decided to transfer from West Virginia stating that "I was really miserable there. I was homesick, and it made me get sick."

=== Old Dominion ===
Simms decided to transfer to Old Dominion and sat out the 2013–2014 season due to NCAA Transfer Rules.

During her first season competing at ODU, Simms was named the Conference USA Newcomer of the Year. Simms was a scoring threat for the Monarchs. She dropped 45 points against Florida International. She finished the 14–15 season averaging 19.3 points, 6.7 rebounds, and 3.6 assists.

In the 2015–16 season, Simms continued to be a tough player for other teams. Simms became the 6th player in ODU history to score 1,000 career points in just two season. She also led the entire league in scoring at 22.2 points, while also finishing in 5th for overall field goal percentage at .460. Simms was suspended from the team in late November after an incident involving another teammate during a tournament in the U.S. Virgin Islands, and was reinstated in late December. Simms was named to the C-USA All-Conference First Team for the 2nd year in a row for her efforts.

In her senior season, Simms increased all her major statistical categories. She averaged 26.0 points, 8.0 points, and 4.2 assists. Simms was named the C-USA Player of the Year, becoming the first ODU player to win the award since 2002. Simms' scoring continued to increase, as she was the 2nd leading scorer in the entire nation. Her scoring average of 26.0 broke an ODU school record previously held by Anne Donovan since 1980–1981.

== College statistics ==
Year	Team	GP	Points	FG%	3P%	FT%	RPG	APG	SPG	BPG	PPG
2012–13	West Virginia	8	25	.333	.429	1.000	1.6	0.4	0.4	0.1	3.1
2013–14	Old Dominion	Redshirt									
2014–15	Old Dominion	34	657	.426	.388	.695	8.1	2.4	1.1	0.7	19.3
2015–16	Old Dominion	31	663	.430	.277	.715	6.7	3.6	1.5	0.7	21.4
2016–17	Old Dominion	31	806	.474	.382	.796	8.0	4.2	1.6	0.7	21.4
Career		104	2151	.443	.351	.741	7.1	3.2	1.3	0.7	20.7

== Professional career ==
=== Washington Mystics ===
In the 2017 WNBA draft, Simms was taken 18th overall by the Washington Mystics. Simms played in 10 career games for the Mystics in 2017, scoring a high of 4 points on June 9, 2017, against the Minnesota Lynx. On July 27, 2017, the Mystics waived Simms from their roster.

=== Indiana Fever ===
In August 2017, the Indiana Fever signed Simms to help out as they were down multiple players to injury. Simms played in 4 games to finish out the 2017 season with the Fever. She scored a new high of 9 points against Minnesota.

Simms re-signed with the Fever as a training camp contract for the 2018 season, but ultimately didn't make the team and was waived on May 4, 2018.

=== Phoenix Mercury ===
Simms since a training camp deal with the Phoenix Mercury on March 18, 2022. She was cut just before the 2022 season opener, but was brought back on a Hardship Contract, as the Mercury were missing players due to injury and Overseas commitments. On May 10, 2022, Simms was released from the hardship contract. Simms returned to the Mercury on June 9, 2022, on another hardship contract. She was released from her hardship on June 23, 2022, after Sophie Cunningham returned from her injury. She was once again brought back on June 27, 2022, when the Mercury signed her again.

Simms went to the training camp with the Mercury for the 2023 season, but was ultimately cut during camp and did not make the team. Simms returned to the Mercury on June 22, 2023, when she signed a hardship contract. Sims was released on July 20, 2023, from the Mercury.

=== Washington Mystics ===
Simms returned to the Mystics in 2023, after signing a 7-Day Contract on August 13, 2023. Simms was released from her hardship contract on August 17, 2023.

== WNBA career statistics ==
Legend
GP	Games played	GS	Games started	MPG	Minutes per game	RPG	Rebounds per game
APG	Assists per game	SPG	Steals per game	BPG	Blocks per game	PPG	Points per game
TO	Turnovers per game	FG%	Field-goal percentage	3P%	3-point field-goal percentage	FT%	Free-throw percentage
**Bold**	Career best	°	League leader

=== Regular season ===
Year	Team	GP	GS	MPG	FG%	3P%	FT%	RPG	APG	SPG	BPG	TO	PPG
2017	Washington	10	0	5.0	.167	.000	**.800**	1.1	0.6	0.2	**0.2**	**0.3**	1.2
2017	Indiana	4	0	**13.5**	.308	**.333**	.500	1.3	0.5	**0.5**	0.0	0.8	2.8
2022	Phoenix	**23**	**4**	13.2	**.476**	.211	.789	**2.2**	**0.9**	**0.5**	0.0	1.0	**3.4**
2023	Phoenix	6	0	11.7	.286	.000	.714	**2.2**	0.5	0.3	0.0	1.0	2.2
Career	2 year, 3 teams	43	4	11.1	.392	.182	.763	1.9	0.7	0.4	0.1	0.8	2.7

=== Playoffs ===
Year	Team	GP	GS	MPG	FG%	3P%	FT%	RPG	APG	SPG	BPG	TO	PPG
2022	Phoenix	2	2	24.5	.267	.200	.200	3.0	2.0	0.0	0.0	1.0	5.5
Career	1 year, 1 team	2	2	24.5	.267	.200	.200	3.0	2.0	0.0	0.0	1.0	5.5
