= Alexis Morris =

American basketball player (born 1999)

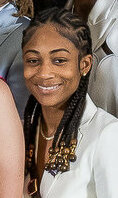
- Morris in 2023

Personal information
- Born: June 8, 1999 (age 27) Beaumont, Texas, U.S.
- Listed height: 5 ft 9 in (1.75 m)

Career information
- High school: Legacy Christian Academy (Beaumont, Texas)
- College: Baylor (2017–2018); Rutgers (2018–2020); Texas A&M (2020–2021); LSU (2021–2023)
- WNBA draft: 2023: 2nd round, 22nd overall pick
- Drafted by: Connecticut Sun
- Position: Guard

Career history
- 2024: Grindavík

Career highlights
- NCAA champion (2023); First-team All-SEC (2023); Big 12 Conference All-Freshman Team (2018); McDonald's All-American (2017)
- Stats at Basketball Reference
Medals
Women's basketball
the United States
FIBA Americas Under-16 Championship
Bronze medal – third place	2015 Mexico	Team

Alexis Moye Morris (born June 8, 1999) is an American professional basketball player . She played college basketball at Baylor, Rutgers, Texas A&M and LSU. She was drafted in the second round, 22nd overall, by the Sun in the 2023 WNBA draft.

== College career ==
Morris's first college team was Baylor, which she joined in 2017, then coached by Kim Mulkey. Morris didn't play for the team due to personal circumstances. She then transferred three times: to Rutgers, to Texas A&M, and then to LSU, where she again played for Mulkey.

At LSU, Morris was the team's second leading scorer. In the 2022–23 season, Morris averaged 15.2 points, 2.9 rebounds and 4.0 assists while shooting 42.9% from the floor. She earned awards including second-team all SEC in her junior year, and first-team all SEC in her senior year. She won the 2023 NCAA national title at LSU.

== Professional career ==
Morris was selected in the Second Round of the 2023 WNBA draft by the Connecticut Sun. Morris was waived during training camp by the Sun on May 10, 2023.

In February 2024, Morris signed with the Harlem Globetrotters and became the seventh current woman to join the organization. She had been returned to North America after starting the season with Ilkem Yapi Tarsus of the Turkish Women's Basketball Super League.

In August 2024, Morris signed with Grindavík of the Icelandic Úrvalsdeild kvenna. She appeared in six league games for the club, averaging 25.8 points.

== Career statistics ==
Legend
GP	Games played	GS	Games started	MPG	Minutes per game	RPG	Rebounds per game
APG	Assists per game	SPG	Steals per game	BPG	Blocks per game	PPG	Points per game
TO	Turnovers per game	FG%	Field-goal percentage	3P%	3-point field-goal percentage	FT%	Free-throw percentage
**Bold**	Career best	°	League leader

=== College ===
Year	Team	GP	GS	MPG	FG%	3P%	FT%	RPG	APG	SPG	BPG	TO	PPG
2017–18	Baylor	34	8	26.2	44.1	**46.2**	83.6	2.9	3.4	0.9	0.0	1.8	9.4
2019–20	Rutgers	Sat out due to NCAA transfer rules											
2019–20	Rutgers	7	0	8.4	25.0	0.00	50.0	0.7	0.6	0.7	0.0	**0.9**	1.0
2020–21	Texas A&M	20	0	9.4	**46.8**	37.5	**85.7**	1.3	1.3	0.5	0.0	1.2	6.0
2021–22	LSU	28	25	32.0	46.1	32.6	78.8	**4.0**	2.8	1.7	**0.2**	1.9	15.0
2022–23	LSU	**36**	**34**	**33.2**	43.3	32.9	78.2	2.9	**4.1**	**1.8**	**0.2**	2.5	**15.4**
**Career**		125	67	25.8	44.3	35.5	80.3	2.8	3.0	1.3	0.1	1.9	11.4
Statistics retrieved from Sports-Reference.

== Personal life ==
Morris grew up in Beaumont, Texas. Morris's grandmother coached basketball, and her father was known for his play as point guard in high school. She has known Kim Mulkey for many years, since she attended Mulkey's camps as a child.

In 2025, Morris made a series of social media posts that were widely interpreted as being directed at former teammate Angel Reese. While she did not mention Reese by name, sports media and fans speculated that the comments were directed at Reese.
