= Elitzur Ramla (women's basketball) =

- Leagues: Israeli League; Israeli State Cup; Eurocup
- Founded: 1970; 56 years ago
- Arena: Kiryat Menahem Arena
- Capacity: 2,000
- Location: Ramla, Israel
- Team colors: Yellow and Black
- President: Nissim Ron
- Head coach: Eden Inbar
- Championships: 1 Eurocup; 13 Israeli League; 6 Israeli State Cup
- Website: http://www.elizur-ramla.co.il
Home	Away

Elitzur Ramla is a professional women's basketball team from Ramla, Israel. Ramla is one of the leading women's basketball teams in Israel. The team won the Israel Championship 13 times and the State Cup 6 times and is the first and only Israeli women's team to win the triple which they won the Eurocup Cup, the Premier League Championship, and the State Cup in the 2011 season.

== History ==
Elitzur Ramla's home court is the Kiryat Menahem Arena in Ramla, with a capacity of 2,000.

In season 1997–98, Ramla won Fourth place in the Ronchetti Cup. In March 2011, Ramla won the EuroCup Women, after a 61–53 triumph against ASPTT Arras from France. It is considered the best team in the history of Israeli women's basketball. The team also won 13 Israeli league championships and 6 Israeli State Cups. In season 2022–23, Ramla participated in the Qualifying round of EuroLeague Women.

== Current roster ==
Note: Flags indicate national team eligibility at FIBA-sanctioned events. Players may hold other non-FIBA nationalities not displayed.

Elitzur Ramla roster
Players
Coaches

Pos.	No.	Nat.	Name	Ht.	Age
C	3	(United States)	Nelson, Chelsea	1.88 m (6 ft 2 in)	30 – 25 June 1996
SG	4	(Israel)	Rotberg, Eden (c)	1.70 m (5 ft 7 in)	28 – 1 July 1998
SG	7	(Israel)	Simms, Jennie	1.83 m (6 ft 0 in)	32 – 21 April 1994
SG	11	(Israel)	Marzok, Yarin	1.70 m (5 ft 7 in)	19 – 22 February 2007
PF	12	(Israel)	Gerzon, Lior	1.85 m (6 ft 1 in)	24 – 16 December 2001
PG	14	(Israel)	Revah, May	1.66 m (5 ft 5 in)	24 – 17 February 2002
SG	15	(Israel)	Kirshtien, Ofir	1.72 m (5 ft 8 in)	24 – 14 August 2002
SF	16	(Israel)	Bar Gal, Tamar	1.83 m (6 ft 0 in)	24 – 22 January 2002
SF	18	(Israel)	Bitan, Mika	1.75 m (5 ft 9 in)	21 – 23 October 2005
SF	20	(Greece)	Bosgana, Eleni	1.90 m (6 ft 3 in)	22 – 6 December 2003
C	21	(United Kingdom)	Herbert Harrigan, Mikiah	1.88 m (6 ft 2 in)	28 – 21 August 1998
PF	22	(Israel)	Penker, Noya	1.85 m (6 ft 1 in)	18 – 26 June 2008
PG	24	(United States)	Guirantes, Arella	1.80 m (5 ft 11 in)	29 – 15 October 1997
SG	35	(Israel)	Meltzer, Gali	1.70 m (5 ft 7 in)	22 – 5 June 2004

Head coach

- (Israel) Eden Inbar

Assistant coach(es)

- (Serbia) Mila Nikolich

Athletic trainer(s)

- (Israel) Roni Gottlieb

Legend

- (C) Team captain
- Injured

- Roster
Updated: 3 February 2026

== Honours ==
=== International competitions ===
- EuroCup Women:
  - Winners (1): 2011
- SuperCup Women:
  - Runners-up (1): 2011

=== Domestic competitions ===
- Israeli Female Basketball Premier League:
  - Winners (13): 1995–96, 1997–98, 1999–00, 2003–04, 2004–05, 2006–07, 2007–08, 2010–11, 2012–13, 2018–19, 2021–22, 2022–23, 2023–24
  - Runners-up (7): 1992–93, 2002–03, 2008–09, 2011–12, 2013–14, 2014–15, 2017–18
- Israeli Women's Basketball Cup:
  - Winners (6): 2003–04, 2006–07, 2008–09, 2010–11, 2013–14, 2018–19
  - Runners-up (12): 1992–93, 1993–94, 1994–95, 1995–96, 1996–97, 1997–98, 1998–99, 2002–03, 2004–05, 2009–10, 2020–21, 2023–24
- Winner Cup:
  - Winners (3): 2010, 2013, 2023

== Notable former players ==
- Limor Mizrachi (ISR)
- Vika Rodovsky (ISR)
- Jamila Wideman (ISR)
- Shay Doron (ISR)
- Laine Selwyn (ISR)
- Ornit Shwartz (ISR)
- Katia Levitsky (ISR)
- Brasheedah Elohim (ISR)
- Jennie Simms (ISR)
- Alysha Clark (ISR)
- Alyssa Baron (ISR)
- Mila Nikolich (SRB)
- Irina Osipova (RUS)
- Annemarie Părău (ROM)
- Tijana Krivačević (SRB)
- Paulina Hersler (SWE)
- Elīna Babkina (LAT)
- Bernadett Határ (HUN)
- Maxuella Lisowa-Mbaka (BEL)
- Adut Bulgak (CAN)
- Vanessa Gidden (JAM)
- Simone Edwards (USA)
- Amber Hall (USA)
- Chasity Melvin (USA)
- Crystal Robinson (USA)
- Shameka Christon (USA)
- Deanna Jackson (USA)
- Sherill Baker (USA)
- Tan White (USA)
- Noelle Quinn (USA)
- LaToya Thomas (USA)
- Plenette Pierson (USA)
- Sheri Sam (USA)
- Monique Currie (USA)
- Ashley Paris (USA)
- Alana Beard (USA)
- Le'coe Willingham (USA)
- Tanisha Wright (USA)
- Charde Houston (USA)
- Lindsay Wisdom-Hylton (USA)
- Allison Hightower (USA)
- Natasha Howard (USA)
- Tamara James (USA)
- Asjha Jones (USA)
- Alex Montgomery (USA)
- Alexis Jones (USA)
- Glory Johnson (USA)
- Danielle McCray (USA)
- DeWanna Bonner (USA)
- Allisha Gray (USA)
- Kia Vaughn (USA)
- Tiffany Mitchell (USA)
- Betnijah Laney (USA)
- Jaime Nared (USA)
- Kelsey Mitchell (USA)
- Brittany Boyd (USA)
- Jillian Alleyne (USA)
- Courtney Williams (USA)
- Crystal Dangerfield (USA)
- Bernice Mosby (USA)
- Shakira Austin (USA)
- Emma Cannon (USA)
- Alexis Prince (USA)
- Sug Sutton (USA)
- Kyra Lambert (USA)
- Arella Guirantes (USA)

== See also ==
- Sport in Israel
