= Maccabi Bnot Ashdod =

מכבי בנות אשדוד Maccabi Bnot Ashdod
- Leagues: EuroCup; Ligat Ha'al; State Cup
- Founded: 1974
- History: 1974–present
- Arena: HaKiriya Arena (capacity 2,200)
- Location: Ashdod, Israel
- Team colors: Yellow and Blue
- President: (Israel) Tali Krief
- Head coach: (Israel) Shira Haelion
- Website: officiel Site
Home	Away

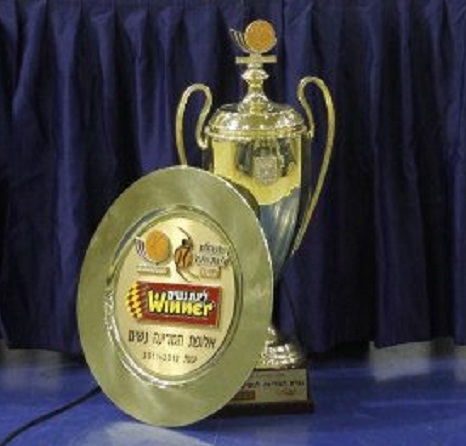
The Cup and the Champion Plate (2011/12)

Maccabi Bnot Ashdod (Hebrew: מכבי בנות אשדוד) is a professional women's basketball team based in Ashdod, playing in the Ligat Ha'al in Israel since 2003. It is the women's basketball division of the Maccabi Ashdod sports club.

During 2009/10, the team reached the finals of the championship. But lost to A.S. Ramat-Hasharon 1–3. A year later (2010/11), the team reached the finals again, and lost to the team of Elitzur Ramla 0–3.

In 2011/12 season, the team participated in the EuroCup for the first time. Later Maccabi Bnot Ashdod won national Cup taking over A.S. Ramat-Hasharon in the final. At the end of the season Maccabi Bnot Ashdod for the first time won the Championship, completing the Double In the final series they won Elitzur Ramla 3–2.

== Winner Cup ==
Early season 2009/10 the team won the "Winner Cup", after winning the set 82-84 Elitzur Ramla. Officially opening the tournament season, which was held at Kibbutz Yad Mordechai. American foreign Ashdod Natasha Lacy was selected for the finals MVP.

== Honors and achievements ==
=== Domestic ===
- Ligat Ha'al
  - Winners: 2011–12, 2013–14, 2014–15, 2015–16, 2016–17
  - Runners-up: 2009–10, 2010–11, 2012–13
- Israeli Cup
  - Winners: 2011–12, 2012–13, 2015–16
- Elizur Cup
  - Winners: 2010, 2014

=== International ===
- EuroCup Women
  - Semifinals: 2014–15

== Roster ==
(as of March 2023)

Note: Flags indicate national team eligibility at FIBA-sanctioned events. Players may hold other non-FIBA nationalities not displayed.

Maccabi Bnot Ashdod roster
Players
Coaches

Pos.	No.	Nat.	Name	Ht.	Age
PG	1	(Latvia)	Jakobsone, Ilze	1.68 m (5 ft 6 in)	31 – 19 April 1994
SG	2	(United States)	Hiedeman, Natisha	1.73 m (5 ft 8 in)	28 – 10 February 1997
SG	3	(Israel)	Hagag, Daniel	1.70 m (5 ft 7 in)	33 – 1 August 1992
PF	4	(Israel)	Sahar, Tal	1.82 m (6 ft 0 in)	28 – 31 March 1997
C	5	(Israel)	Cohen, Alexandra	1.96 m (6 ft 5 in)	32 – 7 June 1993
SG	6	(Israel)	Dayan, May	1.70 m (5 ft 7 in)	31 – 14 May 1994
C	8	(Australia)	Cambage, Liz	2.06 m (6 ft 9 in)	34 – 18 August 1991
PF	13	(United States)	Edelman, Drew	1.93 m (6 ft 4 in)	30 – 25 April 1995
PG	15	(Israel)	Osigwe, Joy	1.70 m (5 ft 7 in)	22 – 26 June 2003
C	21	(United States)	Brown, Kalani	1.95 m (6 ft 5 in)	28 – 21 March 1997
SG	32	(United States)	Walker, Shatori	1.80 m (5 ft 11 in)	30 – 18 May 1995
PG	40	(Israel)	Yizchaki, Yaara	1.69 m (5 ft 7 in)	27 – 27 August 1998

Head coach

- (United States) Le'coe Willingham

Assistant coach(es)

- (Israel) Yair Mor Yosef

Legend

- (C) Team captain
- Injured

- Roster
Updated: 1 March 2023

== Former players ==
- (Israel) Vika Rodovsky
- (Israel) Sarit Arbel
- (Israel) Brasheedah Elohim
- (Israel) Ornit Shwartz
- (Israel) Katia Levitsky
- (Israel) Jenifer Flaisher
- (Israel) Hen Weisbrot
- (Israel) Nomy Kolodny
- (Israel) Shiran Zairy
- (Israel) Natalie Galiok
- (Israel) Meirav Dori
- (Israel) Noa Ganor
- (Australia) Liz Cambage
- (United States) (Israel) Alysha Clark
- (United States) Ashley Walker
- (United States) Natasha Lacy
- (United States) Christi Thomas
- (United States) Courtney Paris
- (United States) Ashley Paris
- (United States) Renee Montgomery
- (United States) Tamara James
- (United States) Ambrosia Anderson
- (United States) Tamera Young
- (United States) Sheri Sam
- (United States) Temeka Johnson
- (United States) Candice Wiggins
- (United States) Tiffany Jackson
- (United States) Danielle Adams
- (United States) Ashley Shields
- (United States) Tiffany Hayes
- (United States) Alexis Peterson
- (United States) Natisha Hiedeman
- (United States) Kalani Brown
- (United States) Shatori Walker

== See also ==
- Maccabi Ashdod B.C.
- Maccabi Ironi Ashdod F.C.
