= Israeli Women's Basketball Premier League =

Main female basketball league in Israel

Israeli Women Basketball Premier League ליגת העל בכדורסל נשים
- Current season, competition or edition: 2024–25 Israeli Women's Basketball Premier League
- Sport: Basketball
- Founded: 1957; 69 years ago
- No. of teams: 10
- Country: Israel
- Confederation: FIBA Europe
- Most recent champion: Maccabi Bnot Ashdod (7 titles) (2024/2025)
- Most titles: Elitzur Tel Aviv (14 titles)
- Broadcaster: Sports Channel
- Level on pyramid: 1
- International cups: EuroLeague; EuroCup
- Website: wbl.co.il

The Israeli Women Basketball Premier League or Ligat Athena Winner (Hebrew: ליגת העל בכדורסל נשים), is a women's professional basketball league in Israel. It is currently composed of 10 teams.

The league was founded in 1957. Initially the most predominant teams in the league were veteran women's basketball clubs such as Maccabi Tel Aviv and Hapoel Tel Aviv, who won almost yearly during the first two decades after the establishment of the women's league. This changed in 1976, when the team Elitzur Tel Aviv began winning all of the league's championships for 19 years straight. During the 1990s the trend again changed, as the most prominent championship winners became A.S Ramat Hasharon and Elitzur Ramla.

The champions of the 2010/2011 season were Elitzur Ramla. Elitzur Tel Aviv and Elitzur Holon share the distinction of having won the most championship trophies, 20 between themselves., although the union that was established in 1990 between the two team was disbanded in 2008.

In the 2010/11 season Elitzur Ramla reached Triple winning, for the first time, the Eurocup League, National league and National cup in one season.

In the 2024/25 season Maccabi Bnot Ashdod reached Triple winning, for the first time, the national league, national cup and Winner cup in one season.

== History ==
The first women's basketball league was established in 1957. Initially, the league was divided into two tables (north and south) and the regional champions would play one game between them to decide the championship. Women's associations of veteran basketball clubs such as Maccabi Tel Aviv, Hapoel Tel Aviv and Hapoel Jerusalem stood out, and the first two were the almost exclusive winners during the first two decades. This only changed in 1976, when Elitzur Tel Aviv established a long dominance in the league and a championship streak that lasted 19 years (including wins by Elitzur Holon, with whom it merged in the late 1980s). From the mid-1990s, there was a change with the addition of players from the former Soviet Union, and the championship battles were mainly fought between Elitzur Ramla and AS Ramat Hasharon.

In the second and third decades of the 21st century, the league was dominated mainly by Elitzur Ramla and Maccabi Bnot Ashdod (6), with one of them appearing in the final every year, and nine direct finals were held between them (five wins for Ramla and four for Ashdod), including five in a row from 2011–2015.

The teams that win the top places in the league or the State Cup participate in the Eurocup League, in which teams with similar achievements from across Europe compete. A.S. Ramat Hasharon reached the final in the 1999 season and third place in the 2005 season, and Elitzur Ramla managed to win the EuroCup in the 2011 season. Participation in the EuroLeague is an option given to the championship winner if it sets a high budget for participation in the event.

The league games are broadcast on the Sports Channel. This is the only women's league in Israel whose games are broadcast live. In the first decade, the league was very competitive with the participation of WNBA players, and league games attracted large crowds. Well-known WNBA players who played in the league include Mwadi Mabika, Cheryl Ford, Deanna Nolan, Alana Beard, DeWanna Bonner, and Liz Cambage.

Despite the importance of the league to women's basketball in Israel, in the second decade, media coverage began to decline and the league's status eroded, which resulted in the league's management having difficulty ensuring its financial existence at the start of each season and difficulty attracting sponsors for the teams. This issue was discussed in the Supreme Court in 2016, claiming that the league is discriminated against in terms of budget compared to men's soccer and basketball.

As a result of the petition, the Ministry of Culture and Sports committed to signing a multi-year renewable marketing agreement between the directorate and the Athena Project, as well as to tripling the direct financial support transferred from the Gambling Settlement Council to the Premier League teams, which is therefore called the "Athena Winner League".

Following the signed agreement, the league's budget doubled in the third decade and reached an all-time high, but the level of media coverage and audience attendance remained relatively low, while the league level declined due to the authorities' lack of support for the teams.

In the 2025/26 season, the foreign players' outline changed to 2+2, two foreign players, in addition to two Bosman players on each team. This was done while introducing the Russian law remembered from the men's league, which will require each team to play with 2 Israeli players on the court at all times, so that only 3 of the foreigners can play at the same time.

== The League's teams (2025/26 season) ==
Club	City	Arena	Capacity	Colors
Maccabi Bnot Ashdod	Ashdod	HaKiriya Arena	2,000	
Maccabi Karmiel Beit HaKerem	Karmiel	Horowitz Arena	500	
Elitzur Ramla	Ramla	Kiryat Menahem Arena	2,000	
Maccabi Ramat Gan	Ramat Gan	Zisman Arena	1,500	
Elitzur Holon	Holon	Holon Toto Hall	5,500	
Hapoel Lev Jerusalem	Jerusalem	Malha Arena	2,000	
Hapoel Rishon LeZion	Rishon LeZion	Gan Nahum	1,500	
Hapoel Beer Sheva Dimona	Beer Sheva	Conch Arena	3,000	
Hapoel Petah Tikva	Petah Tikva	Yitzhak Shamir Hall	400	
Maccabi Haifa	Haifa	Bikurim	750	

== Championships by teams ==
Club	Winners	Winning years
Elitzur Tel Aviv	14	1977, 1978, 1979, 1980, 1981, 1982, 1983, 1984, 1985, 1986, 1987, 1988, 1989, 1990
Elitzur Ramla	13	1996, 1998, 2000, 2004, 2005, 2007, 2008, 2011, 2013, 2019, 2022, 2023, 2024
Maccabi Tel Aviv	11	1958, 1959, 1964, 1965, 1966, 1967, 1968, 1971, 1972, 1973, 1976
Hapoel Tel Aviv	7	1961, 1962, 1969, 1970, 1974, 1975, 2006
Maccabi Bnot Ashdod	7	2012, 2014, 2015, 2016, 2017, 2018, 2025
Elitzur Holon	6	1991, 1992, 1993, 1994, 1995, 1997
A.S Ramat Hasharon	6	1999, 2001, 2002, 2003, 2009, 2010
Maccabi Ramat Gan	2	2020, 2021
Hapoel Jerusalem	1	1960
Hapoel Yagur	1	1963
