= List of 2019 WNBA season transactions =

This is a list of transactions that took place during the off-season and the 2019 WNBA season.

== Retirement ==
Date	Name	Team(s) played (years)	Age	Notes	Ref.
August 21	(United States) Lindsay Whalen	Connecticut Sun (2004-2009); Minnesota Lynx (2010-2018)	36	4× WNBA champion (2011, 2013, 2015, 2017); 5× WNBA All-Star (2006, 2011, 2013–2015); 3× All-WNBA First Team (2008, 2011, 2013); 2× All-WNBA Second Team (2012, 2014); 3× WNBA Peak Performer (2008, 2011–2012); 3× WNBA assists leader (2008, 2011–2012); WNBA Top 20@20 (2016); WNBA playoffs all-time assists leader Also played overseas in Russia, Czech Republic, Turkey, and Northern Cyprus.	
February 21	(Bulgaria) Noelle Quinn	Minnesota Lynx (2007-2008); Los Angeles Sparks (2009-2011); Washington Mystics (2012); Seattle Storm (2013-2014, 2016-2018); Phoenix Mercury (2015-2016)	34	WNBA champion (2018)	
February 26	(United States) Monique Currie	Charlotte Sting (2006); Chicago Sky (2007); Washington Mystics (2007-2014, 2018); Phoenix Mercury (2015, 2017); San Antonio Stars (2016)	36	WNBA All-Rookie Team (2006); Also played overseas in Turkey, Romania and Spain.	
April 16	(United States) Cappie Pondexter	Phoenix Mercury (2006-2009); New York Liberty (2010-2014); Chicago Sky (2015-2017); Los Angeles Sparks (2018); Indiana Fever (2018)	36	2× WNBA champion (2007, 2009); WNBA Finals MVP (2007); 7× WNBA All-Star (2006, 2007, 2009, 2011, 2013–2015); 3× All-WNBA First Team (2009, 2010, 2012); All-WNBA Second Team (2011); WNBA All-Defensive First Team (2010); WNBA All-Rookie Team (2006); WNBA's Top 15 Players of All Time (2011); Also played overseas in Turkey and Russia.	

== Front office movements ==
=== Head coach changes ===
Off-season

Departure date	Team	Outgoing head coach	Reason for departure	Hire date	Incoming head coach	Last coaching position	Ref.
August 31	Chicago Sky	(United States) Amber Stocks	Fired	November 9	(United States) James Wade	Minnesota Lynx assistant coach (2017–2018)	
November 30	Los Angeles Sparks	(United States) Brian Agler	Resigned	December 5	(United States) Derek Fisher	New York Knicks head coach (2014–2016)	
December 18	Dallas Wings	(United States) Taj McWilliams-Franklin	Interim; Contract not renewed	December 18	(United States) Brian Agler	Los Angeles Sparks head coach (2015–2018)	

== Player movement ==
=== Trades ===
April
April 10	To Atlanta Dream: (Germany) Marie Gülich	To Phoenix Mercury: (United States) Brianna Turner
April 10	To Connecticut Sun: (United States) Natisha Hiedeman	To Minnesota Lynx: (United States) Lexie Brown
April 11	To Atlanta Dream: (United States) Nia Coffey	To Las Vegas Aces: 2020 second-round pick
April 11	To Las Vegas Aces: (United States) Sugar Rodgers	To New York Liberty: 2020 second-round pick
April 11	To New York Liberty: (United States) Tanisha Wright	To Minnesota Lynx: 2020 second-round pick
April 22	To Los Angeles Sparks: (United States) Alexis Jones	To Minnesota Lynx: (United States) Odyssey Sims
April 27	To Los Angeles Sparks: (United States) Chiney Ogwumike	To Connecticut Sun: 2020 first-round pick
May
May 16	To Las Vegas Aces: (Australia) Liz Cambage	To Dallas Wings: (United States) Moriah Jefferson; (United States) Isabelle Harrison; 2020 first-round pick; 2020 second-round pick
May 16	To Dallas Wings: (United States) Imani McGee-Stafford	To Atlanta Dream: 2020 third-round pick
May 20	To Chicago Sky: (United States) Jantel Lavender	To Los Angeles Sparks: 2020 second-round pick
May 21	To Minnesota Lynx: (United States) Alaina Coates	To Chicago Sky: 2020 third-round pick
May 21	To Minnesota Lynx: (Australia) Stephanie Talbot	To Phoenix Mercury: 2020 second-round pick
August
August 6	To Connecticut Sun: (United States) Theresa Plaisance	To Dallas Wings: (United States) Kristine Anigwe

=== Free agency ===
Player	Date signed	New team	Former team	Ref
(United States) Cheyenne Parker	February 1	Chicago Sky		
(Australia) Cayla George	February 1	Dallas Wings		
(United States) Glory Johnson	February 1	Dallas Wings		
(United States) Kayla Thornton	February 1	Dallas Wings		
(Canada) Natalie Achonwa	February 1	Indiana Fever		
(United States) Shenise Johnson	February 1	Indiana Fever		
(United States) Erica Wheeler	February 1	Indiana Fever		
(United States) Dearica Hamby	February 1	Las Vegas Aces		
(United Kingdom) Karlie Samuelson	February 1	Los Angeles Sparks		
(United States) Odyssey Sims	February 1	Los Angeles Sparks (Offer sheet matched with Phoenix Mercury)		
(United States) Karima Christmas-Kelly	February 1	Minnesota Lynx	Dallas Wings	
(United States) Briann January	February 1	Phoenix Mercury		
(United States) Yvonne Turner	February 1	Phoenix Mercury		
(United States) Crystal Langhorne	February 1	Seattle Storm		
(United States) Mercedes Russell	February 1	Seattle Storm		
(United States) Natasha Cloud	February 1	Washington Mystics (Offer sheet matched with New York Liberty)		
(United States) Blake Dietrick	February 2	Atlanta Dream		
(Hungary) Allie Quigley	February 2	Chicago Sky		
(United States) Seimone Augustus	February 2	Minnesota Lynx		
(Belgium) Kim Mestdagh	February 4	Washington Mystics	Çukurova (Turkey)	
(Turkey) LaToya Sanders	February 4	Washington Mystics		
(United States) Betnijah Laney	February 5	Indiana Fever	Connecticut Sun	
(United States) Ashley Walker	February 6	Los Angeles Sparks	Mersin BŞB (Turkey)	
(United States) Essence Carson	February 6	Phoenix Mercury	Los Angeles Sparks	
(United States) Haley Peters	February 7	Atlanta Dream	Flammes Carolo Basket (France)	
(United States) Jasmine Thomas	February 7	Connecticut Sun		
(United States) Teana Muldrow	February 7	Seattle Storm		
(Brazil) Damiris Dantas	February 8	Minnesota Lynx	Atlanta Dream	
(Bosnia and Herzegovina) Lynetta Kizer	February 11	Atlanta Dream	Minnesota Lynx	
(United States) Alana Beard	February 11	Los Angeles Sparks		
(Australia) Rebecca Allen	February 11	New York Liberty		
(United States) Kelly Faris	February 11	New York Liberty	Breiðablik (Iceland)	
(Canada) Nayo Raincock-Ekunwe	February 11	New York Liberty	CJM Bourges Basket (France)	
(Sweden) Amanda Zahui B.	February 11	New York Liberty		
(United States) Tierra Ruffin-Pratt	February 13	Los Angeles Sparks	Washington Mystics	
(United States) Jamierra Faulkner	February 15	Chicago Sky		
(United States) Linnae Harper	February 18	Chicago Sky		
(United States) Asia Taylor	February 18	Indiana Fever		
(United States) Victoria Macaulay	February 19	Chicago Sky	Galatasaray (Turkey)	
(United States) Brooke McCarty-Williams	February 19	Dallas Wings	Los Angeles Sparks	
(United States) Saniya Chong	February 20	Las Vegas Aces	Dallas Wings	
(Canada) Ruth Hamblin	February 20	Las Vegas Aces	BC Castors Braine (Belgium)	
(Ukraine) Alina Iagupova	February 20	Los Angeles Sparks	Çukurova (Turkey)	
(United States) Alex Harden	February 21	Las Vegas Aces	Maccabi Ramat Hen (Israel)	
(United States) Jillian Alleyne	February 22	Minnesota Lynx		
(Australia) Nicole Seekamp	February 25	Dallas Wings	Adelaide Lightning (Australia)	
(Spain) Astou Ndour	February 27	Chicago Sky		
(United States) Ariel Edwards	February 27	Connecticut Sun	Araski AES (Spain)	
(United States) Erlana Larkins	February 28	Minnesota Lynx		
(Australia) Kelsey Griffin	February 28	Minnesota Lynx	Canberra Capitals (Australia)	
(United States) Rachel Hollivay	March 5	Los Angeles Sparks	Nantes Basket (France)	
(United States) Kolby Morgan	March 8	New York Liberty		
(United States) Reshanda Gray	March 11	New York Liberty		
(United States) Shey Peddy	March 11	Washington Mystics	TTT Riga (Latvia)	
(China) Sun Mengran	March 15	Atlanta Dream	Bayi Kylin (China)	
(Belgium) Hind Ben Abdelkader	March 18	Chicago Sky	Indiana Fever	
(France) Marine Johannès	March 21	New York Liberty	CJM Bourges Basket (France)	
(Spain) Sancho Lyttle	March 21	Phoenix Mercury		
(United States) Brianna Kiesel	March 22	Connecticut Sun	AZS-UMCS Lublin (Poland)	
(United States) DeWanna Bonner	March 22	Phoenix Mercury		
(United States) Brittany Boyd	March 27	New York Liberty		
(United States) Loryn Goodwin	March 28	Los Angeles Sparks	Dallas Wings	
(United States) Emma Cannon	April 11	Connecticut Sun	Phoenix Mercury	
(Croatia) Shavonte Zellous	April 11	Seattle Storm	New York Liberty	
(United States) Crystal Bradford	April 12	Indiana Fever	Bnot Hertzliya (Israel)	
(United States) Bria Goss	April 12	Indiana Fever	Maccabi Raanana (Israel)	
(United States) Gabby Green	April 12	Los Angeles Sparks	Loyola Marymount	
(Netherlands) Emese Hof	April 16	Phoenix Mercury	Miami	
(United States) Alexis Peterson	April 16	Phoenix Mercury	Indiana Fever	
(United States) Meme Jackson	April 17	Atlanta Dream	Tennessee	
(United States) Dominique Wilson	April 17	Las Vegas Aces	Widzew Łódź (Poland)	
(China) Shao Ting	April 17	Minnesota Lynx	Beijing Great Wall (China)	
(United States) AJ Alix	April 17	Washington Mystics		
(United States) G'mrice Davis	April 17	Washington Mystics	Minnesota Lynx	
(Thailand) Tiffany Bias	April 18	New York Liberty	Dallas Wings	
(United States) Bianca Cuevas-Moore	April 18	New York Liberty	South Carolina	
(United States) Receé Caldwell	April 18	Seattle Storm	California	
(United States) Presley Hudson	April 18	Seattle Storm	Central Michigan	
(United States) Zyreka Rice	April 18	Seattle Storm	Gonzaga	
(United States) Talia Caldwell	April 22	New York Liberty	Dynamo Kursk (Russia)	
(United States) Allazia Blockton	April 23	Chicago Sky	Marquette	
(United States) Maci Morris	April 23	Washington Mystics	Kentucky	
(United States) Taylor Emery	April 24	Minnesota Lynx	Virginia Tech	
(United States) Leslie Robinson	April 30	Chicago Sky	New York Liberty	
(United States) Chelsea Gray	April 30	Los Angeles Sparks		
(Nigeria) Pallas Kunaiyi-Akpanah	May 3	Chicago Sky	Northwestern	
(United States) Tina Charles	May 3	New York Liberty		
(United States) Ashton Millender	May 4	Chicago Sky	DePaul	
(United States) Sydney Colson	May 13	Las Vegas Aces	Minnesota Lynx	
(United States) Cierra Dillard	May 13	Los Angeles Sparks (claimed off waivers)	Minnesota Lynx (waived on May 11)	
(United States) Riquna Williams	May 15	Los Angeles Sparks		
(United States) Kennedy Burke	May 25	Indiana Fever (claimed off waivers)	Dallas Wings (waived on May 22)	
(United States) Ashley Walker	June 3	Los Angeles Sparks (Previously waived on May 23, 2019)		
(Australia) Leilani Mitchell	June 5	Phoenix Mercury (Previously waived on May 23, 2019)		
(United States) Blake Dietrick	June 5	Seattle Storm (claimed off waivers)	Atlanta Dream (waived on May 23)	
(United States) Shey Peddy	June 8	Washington Mystics (Previously waived on May 23, 2019)		
(United States) Victoria Macaulay	June 13	Chicago Sky (Previously waived on May 22, 2019)		
(United States) Megan Gustafson	June 13	Dallas Wings (Previously waived on May 22, 2019)		
(United States) Natisha Hiedeman	June 19	Atlanta Dream (claimed off waivers)	Connecticut Sun (waived on May 23)	
(United States) Avery Warley-Talbert	June 27	New York Liberty (Previously waived on May 25, 2019)		
(United States) Kenisha Bell	July 2	Minnesota Lynx (Previously waived on May 21, 2019)		
(United States) Asia Taylor	July 2	Minnesota Lynx (claimed off waivers)	Indiana Fever (waived on May 25)	
(United States) Natisha Hiedeman	July 3	Connecticut Sun (claimed off waivers)	Atlanta Dream (waived on July 1)	
(United Kingdom) Karlie Samuelson	July 18	Los Angeles Sparks (7-day contract, previously waived on May 23, 2019)		
(United States) Alaina Coates	July 18	Atlanta Dream (claimed off waivers)	Minnesota Lynx (waived on July 14)	
(United States) Jillian Alleyne	July 30	Minnesota Lynx (7-day contract, previously waived on May 21, 2019)		
(United States) Arica Carter	August 4	Phoenix Mercury (7-day contract, previously waived on June 2, 2019)		
(United States) Jaime Nared	August 6	Las Vegas Aces (7-day contract, previously waived on May 23, 2019)		
(United States) Jillian Alleyne	August 6	Minnesota Lynx (second 7-day contract)		
(United States) Asia Taylor	August 6	Phoenix Mercury (7-day contract)	Minnesota Lynx (waived on July 25)	
(United States) Arica Carter	August 12	Phoenix Mercury (second 7-day contract)		
(United States) Jaime Nared	August 13	Las Vegas Aces (second 7-day contract)		
(United States) Jillian Alleyne	August 13	Minnesota Lynx (third 7-day contract)		
(United States) Asia Taylor	August 13	Phoenix Mercury (second 7-day contract)		
(United States) Shey Peddy	August 13	Washington Mystics (7-day contract, previously waived on July 11, 2019)		
(United States) Asia Taylor	August 20	Phoenix Mercury (third 7-day contract)		
(United States) Shey Peddy	August 20	Washington Mystics (second 7-day contract)		
(Canada) Kayla Alexander	August 22	Chicago Sky (7-day contract)	Indiana Fever (waived on May 22)	
(Canada) Bridget Carleton	August 22	Minnesota Lynx (7-day contract)	Connecticut Sun (waived on July 3)	
(United States) Shey Peddy	August 27	Washington Mystics (third 7-day contract)		
(Russia) Epiphanny Prince	August 28	Las Vegas Aces (Signed for rest of season)	New York Liberty	
(United Kingdom) Karlie Samuelson	August 29	Dallas Wings (7-day contract)	Los Angeles Sparks	
(Canada) Kayla Alexander	August 29	Chicago Sky (second 7-day contract)		
(Canada) Bridget Carleton	August 29	Washington Mystics (Signed for rest of season)		
(United States) Shey Peddy	September 3	Washington Mystics (Signed for rest of season)		
(Canada) Kayla Alexander	September 5	Chicago Sky (Signed for rest of season)		
(United Kingdom) Karlie Samuelson	September 5	Dallas Wings (Signed for rest of season)		

=== Waived ===
Player	Date Waived	Former Team	Ref
(United States) Asia Taylor	May 25	Indiana Fever	
(United States) Arica Carter	June 1	Phoenix Mercury	
(United States) Anriel Howard	June 5	Seattle Storm	
(United States) Ashley Walker	June 17	Los Angeles Sparks	
(United States) Natisha Hiedeman	July 1	Atlanta Dream	
(Canada) Bridget Carleton	July 3	Connecticut Sun	
(Thailand) Tiffany Bias	July 8	New York Liberty	
(United States) Avery Warley-Talbert	July 8	New York Liberty	
(United States) Victoria Macauley	July 9	Chicago Sky	
(United States) Shey Peddy	July 11	Washington Mystics	
(China) Shao Ting	July 13	Minnesota Lynx	
(United States) Alaina Coates	July 14	Minnesota Lynx	
(United States) Haley Peters	July 17	Atlanta Dream	
(United States) Kenisha Bell	July 19	Minnesota Lynx	
(United States) Asia Taylor	July 25	Minnesota Lynx	
(United States) Chloe Jackson	August 22	Chicago Sky	
(United States) Asia Taylor	August 25	Phoenix Mercury	

==== Training camp cuts ====
All players listed did not make the final roster.

Atlanta Dream	Chicago Sky	Connecticut Sun	Dallas Wings
Blake Dietrick; Meme Jackson; Lynetta Kizer	Hind Ben Abdelkader; Evelyn Akhator; Allazia Blockton; Linnae Harper; Pallas Kunaiyi-Akpanah; Victoria Macaulay; Ashton Millender; Leslie Robinson	Emma Cannon; Ariel Edwards; Natisha Hiedeman; Brianna Kiesel; Regan Magarity	Morgan Bertsch; Kennedy Burke; Cayla George; Megan Gustafson; Nicole Seekamp
Indiana Fever	Las Vegas Aces	Los Angeles Sparks	Minnesota Lynx
Kayla Alexander; Crystal Bradford; Bria Goss; Caliya Robinson	Lindsay Allen; Kelsey Bone; Saniya Chong; Ruth Hamblin; Alex Harden; Jaime Nared; Dominique Wilson	Cierra Dillard; Loryn Goodwin; Gaby Green; Rachel Hollivay; Karlie Samuelson; Ashley Walker	Jillian Alleyne; Kenisha Bell; Cierra Dillard; Taylor Emory; Erlana Larkins
New York Liberty	Phoenix Mercury	Seattle Storm	Washington Mystics
Talia Caldwell; Bianca Cuevas-Moore; Kelly Faris; Megan Huff; Kolby Morgan; Avery Warley-Talbert	Emese Hof; Leilani Mitchell; Alexis Peterson	Recee Caldwell; Presley Hudson; Macy Miller; Teana Muldrow; Zykera Rice; Brooke Salas	AJ Alix; G'mrice Davis; Sam Fuehring; Maci Morris; Shey Peddy

== Draft ==
=== First round ===
Pick	Player	Date signed	Team	Ref
1	(United States) Jackie Young	April 17	Las Vegas Aces	
2	(United States) Asia Durr	May 3	New York Liberty	
3	(United States) Teaira McCowan	April 26	Indiana Fever	
4	(United States) Katie Lou Samuelson	April 26	Chicago Sky	
5	(United States) Arike Ogunbowale	April 18	Dallas Wings	
6	(United States) Napheesa Collier	April 19	Minnesota Lynx	
7	(United States) Kalani Brown	April 18	Los Angeles Sparks	
8	(Australia) Alanna Smith	April 20	Phoenix Mercury	
9	(United States) Kristine Anigwe	April 18	Connecticut Sun	
10	(United States) Kiara Leslie	April 19	Washington Mystics	
11	(United States) Brianna Turner	April 16	Atlanta Dream	
12	(Australia) Ezi Magbegor	April 25	Seattle Storm	

=== Second round ===
Pick	Player	Date signed	Team	Ref
13	(United States) Sophie Cunningham	April 22	Phoenix Mercury	
14	(China) Han Xu	April 18	New York Liberty	
15	(United States) Chloe Jackson	April 19	Chicago Sky	
16	(United States) Jessica Shepard	April 24	Minnesota Lynx	
17	(United States) Megan Gustafson	April 20	Dallas Wings	
18	(United States) Natisha Hiedeman	April 12	Minnesota Lynx	
19	(United States) Marina Mabrey	April 25	Los Angeles Sparks	
20	(United States) Cierra Dillard	April 12	Minnesota Lynx	
21	(Canada) Bridget Carleton	April 12	Connecticut Sun	
22	(United States) Kennedy Burke	April 18	Dallas Wings	
23	(Spain) Maite Cazorla	May 3	Atlanta Dream	
24	(United States) Anriel Howard	April 22	Seattle Storm	

=== Third round ===
Pick	Player	Date signed	Team	Ref
25	(United States) Paris Kea	April 23	Indiana Fever	
26	(United States) Megan Huff	April 18	New York Liberty	
27	(Spain) María Conde	April 23	Chicago Sky	
28	(United States) Caliya Robinson	April 23	Indiana Fever	
29	(United States) Morgan Bertsch	April 20	Dallas Wings	
30	(United States) Kenisha Bell	April 23	Minnesota Lynx	
31	(Spain) Ángela Salvadores	—	Los Angeles Sparks	
32	(United States) Arica Carter	April 17	Phoenix Mercury	
33	(Sweden) Regan Magarity	April 17	Connecticut Sun	
34	(United States) Sam Fuehring	May 3	Washington Mystics	
35	(China) Li Yueru	—	Atlanta Dream	
36	(United States) Macy Miller	April 18	Seattle Storm	
