= List of 2024–25 WNBL season transactions =

This is a list of transactions that have taken place during the off-season and throughout the 2024-25 WNBL season.

== Front office movements ==
=== Head coach changes ===
Off-season

Departure date	Team	Outgoing head coach	Reason for departure	Hire date	Incoming head coach	Last coaching position	Ref.
May 22	Southside Flyers	(Australia) Cheryl Chambers	Resigned	June 5	(Australia) Kristi Harrower	Melbourne Boomers assistant coach (2022–2024)	
June 14	Canberra Capitals	(Australia) Kristen Veal	Resigned	June 14	(Australia) Paul Goriss	Canberra Capitals assistant coach (2023–24)	

== Player movement ==
=== Free agency ===
Player	Date signed	New team	Former team	Ref
(Australia) Courtney Woods	February 28	Townsville Fire		
(Australia) Jaz Shelley	June 5	Geelong United	Nebraska Cornhuskers (USA)	
(Australia) Emma Clarke	June 14	Sydney Flames		
(Australia) Saffron Shiels	June 14	Townsville Fire		
(Australia) Keely Froling	June 18	Geelong United	Melbourne Boomers	
(Australia) Sarah Elsworthy	June 24	Geelong United	Geelong United (VIC)	
(Australia) Marianna Tolo	June 26	Bendigo Spirit	Uni Girona CB (ESP)	
(Australia) Jade Melbourne	July 2	Canberra Capitals		
(Australia) Alex Fowler	July 2	Townsville Fire	Canberra Capitals	
(Australia) Casey Samuels	July 4	Bendigo Spirit		
(United States) Lauren Cox	July 4	Townsville Fire	Virtus Bologna (ITA)	
(Australia) Anneli Maley	July 5	Perth Lynx		
(Australia) Nyadiew Puoch	July 9	Canberra Capitals	Southside Flyers	
(Australia) Elissa Brett	July 9	Geelong United	Michigan Wolverines (USA)	
(Australia) Ashlee Hannan	July 10	Bendigo Spirit	Perth Lynx	
(United States) Celeste Taylor	July 11	Sydney Flames	Ohio State Buckeyes (USA)	
(Australia) Lucy Cochrane	July 11	Townsville Fire	Portland Pilots (USA)	
(Australia) Gemma Potter	July 12	Geelong United	Canberra Capitals	
(Australia) Alicia Froling	July 12	Townsville Fire	Bendigo Spirit	
(Australia) Mackenzie Clinch Hoycard	July 16	Perth Lynx		
(United States) Jacy Sheldon	July 17	Townsville Fire	Ohio State Buckeyes (USA)	
(Australia) Sherrie Calleia	July 19	Sydney Flames	Melbourne Boomers	
(Australia) Amy Atwell	July 22	Perth Lynx		
(United States) Mikaela Ruef	July 23	Sydney Flames	Townsville Fire	
(New Zealand) Ella Tofaeono	July 23	Canberra Capitals	Townsville Fire	
(Australia) Lauren Mansfield	July 23	Townsville Fire	Adelaide Lightning	
(United States) DiDi Richards	July 25	Sydney Flames		
(United States) Teige Morrell	July 28	Perth Lynx		
(Australia) Hannah Hank	July 30	Geelong United	Brisbane Capitals (QLD)	
(Australia) Abbey Ellis	July 30	Townsville Fire	Purdue Boilermakers (USA)	
(South Sudan) Nyaduoth Lok	August 1	Townsville Fire	George Washington Revolutionaries (USA)	
(Australia) Monique Conti	August 6	Geelong United	Melbourne Boomers	
(Australia) Bonnie Deas	August 14	Sydney Flames	Centre of Excellence (ACT)	
(Australia) Stephanie Gorman	August 16	Perth Lynx		
(Australia) Maddison Rocci	August 17	Southside Flyers		
(Australia) Miela Goodchild	August 20	Perth Lynx		
(Australia) Stephanie Talbot	August 23	Adelaide Lightning		
(Australia) Isobel Borlase	August 26	Adelaide Lightning		
(Australia) Isabelle Bourne	August 27	Adelaide Lightning		
(Australia) Kelly Wilson	August 29	Bendigo Spirit		
(United States) Haley Jones	August 29	Geelong United	Atlanta Dream (USA)	
(Australia) Madison Freer	August 30	Adelaide Lightning	Forestville Eagles (SA)	
(Australia) Majella Carey	August 30	Townsville Fire		
(Australia) Jessica McDowell-White	August 30	Townsville Fire		
(United States) Japreece Dean	August 31	Adelaide Lightning	Hainaut Saint-Amand (FRA)	
(Australia) Carley Ernst	August 31	Southside Flyers		
(Australia) Haylee Andrews	September 3	Adelaide Lightning	Sunshine Coast Phoenix (QLD)	
(Australia) Chantel Horvat	September 3	Canberra Capitals	CB Jairis (ESP)	
(Australia) Dallas Loughridge	September 3	Southside Flyers		
(Australia) Georgia Pineau	September 5	Adelaide Lightning	Rockingham Flames (WA)	
(Australia) Ella Gordon	September 6	Adelaide Lightning	Bendigo Spirit	
(Australia) Opal Bird	September 6	Bendigo Spirit	Centre of Excellence (ACT)	
(New Zealand) Tera Reed	September 6	Southside Flyers	Melbourne Boomers	
(Australia) Isabella Brancatisano	September 9	Sydney Flames	Mount Gambier Pioneers (SA)	
(Australia) Indiah Bowyer	September 10	Canberra Capitals	Townsville Fire	
(Australia) Taylor Mole	September 10	Geelong United	Adelaide Lightning	
(Israel) Daniel Raber	September 11	Geelong United	Elitzur Ramla (ISR)	
(Australia) Manuela Puoch	September 11	Southside Flyers	Dandenong Rangers (VIC)	
(Australia) Monique Bobongie	September 12	Canberra Capitals	Centre of Excellence (ACT)	
(Bosnia and Herzegovina) Lynetta Kizer	September 12	Geelong United	CB Islas Canarias (ESP)	
(United States) Brianna Turner	September 13	Adelaide Lightning		
(United States) Yemiyah Morris	September 13	Sydney Flames	Elitzur Ramla (ISR)	
(Australia) Sami Whitcomb	September 14	Bendigo Spirit	Townsville Fire	
(Australia) Alice Kunek	September 16	Southside Flyers	Townsville Fire	
(Australia) Katie Deeble	September 17	Canberra Capitals	Wake Forest Demon Deacons (USA)	
(Australia) Meg Jefferson	September 19	Canberra Capitals	Hills Hornets (NSW)	
(United States) Charli Collier	September 24	Canberra Capitals	Heilongjiang Dragons (CHN)	
(United States) Naz Hillmon	October 3	Southside Flyers	Melbourne Boomers	
(United States) Veronica Burton	October 9	Bendigo Spirit	AZS UMCS Lublin (POL)	
(United States) Mikayla Vaughn	October 10	Southside Flyers	AZS Poznań (POL)	
(United States) Zia Cooke	October 17	Townsville Fire	Los Angeles Sparks (USA)	
(Australia) Carla Pitman	October 18	Sydney Flames		
(Australia) Piper Anderson	October 22	Sydney Flames	Sydney Comets (NSW)	
(Australia) Caitlyn Martin	October 22	Sydney Flames	Norths Bears (NSW)	
(Australia) Tayah Burrows	October 24	Southside Flyers	Luleå Basket (SWE)	
(Australia) Claudea Waihape-Andrews	October 29	Canberra Capitals		
(Australia) Nikki Worner	October 29	Canberra Capitals	Canberra Nationals (ACT)	

== Outgoing movement ==
=== Going overseas ===
Player	Date signed	Former team	New team	Ref
(Australia) Isla Juffermans	November 9	Sydney Flames	Louisville Cardinals (USA)	
(Australia) Stephanie Reid	May 10	Townsville Fire	Sopron Basket (HUN)	
(Australia) Zitina Aokuso	May 11	Townsville Fire	OGM Ormanspor (TUR)	
(New Zealand) Esra McGoldrick	May 13	Bendigo Spirit	Mainland Pouākai (NZL)	
(United States) Mehryn Kraker	June 10	Bendigo Spirit	Luleå Basket (SWE)	
(Australia) Alexandra Sharp	July 2	Canberra Capitals	CB Estudiantes (ESP)	
(New Zealand) McKenna Dale	July 19	Bendigo Spirit	Tauranga Whai (NZL)	
(Australia) Lara McSpadden	July 25	Sydney Flames	Tauranga Whai (NZL)	
(United States) Jasmine Dickey	July 30	Southside Flyers	Keflavík (ISL)	
(New Zealand) Tahlia Tupaea	August 1	Canberra Capitals	Northern Kāhu (NZL)	
(New Zealand) Jade Kirisome	August 7	Canberra Capitals	Tauranga Whai (NZL)	
(New Zealand) Penina Davidson	August 13	Melbourne Boomers	Northern Kāhu (NZL)	
(Australia) Chloe Forster	August 15	Perth Lynx	Northern Kāhu (NZL)	
(Canada) Cassandra Brown	August 15	Townsville Fire	Mainland Pouākai (NZL)	
(Australia) Lilly Rotunno	August 21	Melbourne Boomers	Northern Kāhu (NZL)	
(Australia) Ahlise Hurst	August 21	Sydney Flames	Southern Hoiho (NZL)	
(United States) Paige Bradley	August 22	Sydney Flames	Southern Hoiho (NZL)	
(Sweden) Amanda Zahui B.	August 31	Townsville Fire	CCC Polkowice (POL)	
(Canada) Emily Potter	September 8	Perth Lynx	ŽKK Crvena zvezda (SRB)	
(Australia) Louise Brown	September 12	Southside Flyers	Tokomanawa Queens (NZL)	

=== Retirement ===
Name	Date	Team(s) played (years)	Notes	Ref.
(Australia) Tess Madgen	September 3	Australian Institute of Sport (2008–2010); Bendigo Spirit (2010–2012); Bulleen / Melbourne Boomers (2012–2016, 2020–2023); Townsville Fire (2018–2020); Sydney Flames (2023–24)	WNBL Champion (2023); 2x All-WNBL Team (2015, 2020); Also played overseas in Poland and the United States. Represented Australia national team across 13 years.	

== See also ==
- List of 2024–25 WNBL team rosters
