= List of killings by law enforcement officers in the United States, June 2019 =

This is a list of people reported killed by non-military law enforcement officers in the United States in June 2019, whether in the line of duty or not, and regardless of reason or method. The listing documents the occurrence of a death, making no implications regarding wrongdoing or justification on the part of the person killed or officer involved. Killings are arranged by date of the incident that caused death. Different death dates, if known, are noted in the description. The table below lists 83 people.

== June 2019 ==
Date	Name (age) of deceased	State (city)	Description
2019-06-29	Jack Daniel West (61)	Texas (Lantana)	West was shot and killed by police.
2019-06-28	Gene Pool (37)	Colorado (Pueblo)	Pool was shot and killed by police.
2019-06-28	Ryan Moody (19)	Mississippi (Pearl)	Moody was shot and killed by police.
2019-06-28	William Lamb (76)	Tennessee (Smyrna)	Lamb was shot and killed by police.
2019-06-28	Zackary Ryan Hoppe (40)	Texas (Bacliff)	Hoppe was shot and killed by police.
2019-06-27	Benjamin Ray Smith (54)	South Carolina (Orangeburg)	Smith was shot and killed by police.
2019-06-27	Matthew Christian Smith (33)	Nebraska (Omaha)	Smith was shot and killed by police.
2019-06-27	Stephen D. Sloan (35)	Kentucky (Wolfe County)	Sloan was shot and killed by police.
2019-06-27	Eric Sandoval (41)	California (Yucca Valley)	Sandoval was shot and killed by police.
2019-06-27	Paul David Rea (18)	California (Los Angeles)	Rea was shot and killed by police.
2019-06-27	William Aubrey Martin III (50)	Oklahoma (Tulsa)	Martin was shot and killed by police.
2019-06-27	Marvin Green (50)	Florida (Springfield)	Green was shot and killed by police.
2019-06-26	Michael S. Norquest (50)	Virginia (Timberville)	Norquest was shot and killed by police.
2019-06-26	Elijah Collins III (32)	Ohio (Sugarcreek)	Collins was shot and killed by police.
2019-06-25	Tomas Hernandez (35)	Texas (San Antonio)	Hernandez was shot and killed by police.
2019-06-25	Shawn D. Blowers (43)	Wisconsin (Menasha)	Blowers was shot and killed by police.
2019-06-24	Bradley Rundle (61)	Florida (Englewood)	Rundle was shot and killed by police.
2019-06-24	Jaymil Ellerbe (19)	Massachusetts (Boston)	Ellerbe was shot and killed by police.
2019-06-24	Peter Alexander Bohning (34)	Texas (Seminole)	Bohning was shot and killed by police.
2019-06-23	Michael Spencer (29)	Ohio (Springfield)	Spencer was shot and killed by police.
2019-06-22	Scott William Robertson (41)	Maryland (Phoenix)	Robertson was shot and killed by police.
2019-06-22	Kevin Anthony Alaniz (26)	California (Big Sur)	Alaniz was shot and killed by police.
2019-06-20	Dewayne M. Tackett (38)	Ohio (Ashville)	Tackett was shot and killed by police officers.
2019-06-20	Eric Portillo (37)	Oklahoma (Tulsa)	Portillo was shot and killed by police.
2019-06-20	Juan Carlos Chapa Jr. (33)	Texas (Mission)	Chapa was shot and killed by police.
2019-06-18	DeWayne Watkins (74)	New York (Syracuse)	Watkins was shot and killed by police.
2019-06-18	Michael Sheridan (34)	Colorado (Jefferson County)	Sheridan was shot and killed by police officers.
2019-06-18	Josh Flores (18)	Washington (Centralia)	Flores was shot and killed by police.
2019-06-17	Francisco "Paco" Tarin (35)	New Mexico (Las Cruces)	Tarin was shot and killed by police.
2019-06-17	Mark Anthony Galvan (20)	Texas (Brownsville)	Galvan was shot and killed by police.
2019-06-17	Bryan Isaack Clyde (22)	Texas (Dallas)	Bryan Isaack Clyde (whose name was initially reported in many outlets as Brian Isaac Clyde), was shot by one or more federal officers in an exchange of gunfire outside the Earle Cabell Federal Building and Courthouse. Main article: 2019 Dallas courthouse shooting
2019-06-16	Carlos Vale (31)	Arizona (Tucson)	Vale was shot and killed by police.
2019-06-16	Eric Jack Logan (53)	Indianapolis (South Bend)	Logan was shot and killed by police.
2019-06-15	Shawn Ray Wilson (48)	Alaska (Fairbanks)	Wilson was shot and killed by police officers.
2019-06-15	Ty'Rese West (18)	Wisconsin (Racine)	West was shot and killed by police.
2019-06-15	Michael Sheehan II (45)	New Hampshire (Belmont)	Sheehan was shot and killed by police.
2019-06-15	Mantry Norris (20)	Washington (Renton)	Officers encountered Norris after being called to the parking lot of the bar. He shouted something about "killing some people" and ran into the bar. Officers followed. Norris began stabbing a bar patron, at which point officers shot Norris.
2019-06-15	Jamarcus Dejun Moore (28)	Alabama (Birmingham)	Moore was shot and killed by police.
2019-06-15	Drew Edwards (22)	Iowa (Maquoketa)	Officers used a taser on Edwards, who ran away. They chased him and used a taser again before restraining him on the ground. A taser was deployed several times until it was discovered that Edwards was unconscious.
2019-06-15	Alfredo Chino (38)	Washington (Toppenish)	Chino was shot and killed by police.
2019-06-14	Kenneth French (32)	California (Corona)	An off-duty LAPD officer shot and killed French at a Costco, and wounded his parents. The officer claimed he thought French had shot him. French was unarmed, and had a mental disability.
2019-06-13	Marquis Weems (17)	Maryland (Rockville)	Weems was shot and killed by police.
2019-06-13	Tramon Savage (22)	Arkansas (Jacksonville)	Savage was shot and killed by police.
2019-06-12	Brandon Webber (20)	Tennessee (Memphis)	Webber was shot and killed by police.
2019-06-12	Juan Manuel Moreno Jr. (35)	Texas (Farmers Branch)	Moreno was shot and killed by police.
2019-06-11	Jaquan Derrick Diijon Thompson (27)	Oklahoma (Poteau)	A Poteau police officer and LeFlore County Sheriff’s deputy were dispatched to a 911 call at 4:45 a.m. of a suspect holding the clerk of a gas station hostage at knife point. The two officers encountered the suspect and the hostage, with the suspect not obeying demands to drop the knife. The situation escalated, and resulted with both officers firing shots at the suspect, killing him. The suspect was later identified as 27-year-old Jaquan Derrick Diijon Thompson.
2019-06-11	Eddie Humberto Segura (40)	Florida (Orlando)	Segura was shot and killed by police.
2019-06-11	Jimmy De Odell (61)	Texas (Hopkins County)	Odell was shot and killed by police.
2019-06-11	Thomas Ray Berry (52)	California (Riverside)	Berrywas shot and killed by police.
2019-06-10	Vincense Dewayne Williams Jr. (24)	Oklahoma (Oklahoma City)	Williams was shot and killed by police.
2019-06-10	Bryan Bernard Wallace (39)	Florida (Clearwater)	Officers were called about a man waving a gun in a crowd. After searching for 30 minutes, officers received additional information and found the individual. As officers approached, a gun fell from Wallace's waistband. Wallace was shot when he reached for the gun.
2019-06-10	Terry Frost (NA)	Tennessee (Kingsport)	Frost, who was wanted on a warrant, was in an SUV pulled over by police. As the female driver got out of the vehicle, Frost, who was in the back seat, jumped into the driver seat and attempted to speed away. The officer initiating the traffic stop was dragged when he attempted to stop Frost, and as he was being dragged managed to fire shots in Frost's direction. Both the officer and Frost were taken to hospital, with Frost being pronounced dead shortly after and the officer sustaining serious injuries.
2019-06-10	Brent Durbin-Daniel (19)	Oklahoma (Lawton)	Durbin-Daniel got into an argument with his mother and left the house with two assault rifles and a handgun. He then drove to his friend's apartment where he was stopped by police in the parking lot. According to police Durbin-Daniel did not comply with orders to drop his weapons, and this resulted in the officers opening fire, killing him. According to Durbin-Daniel's friend who was at the scene, he was simply reaching for a cigarette when the officers opened fire.
2019-06-09	Jaquavion Slaton (20)	Texas (Fort Worth)	Police pulled over a vehicle that had Slaton, who was wanted on a warrant, and two other individuals. As the police commenced the traffic stop, Slaton and another passenger fled the scene. The driver of the vehicle, as well as the other passenger who was detained shortly afterwards, were arrested without incident. The police officers then observed Slaton getting into and locking himself in another vehicle. As police tried to break the glass of the vehicle, they observed that Slaton had a firearm. When Slaton allegedly reached for the firearm, three of the officers opened fire, killing Slaton.
2019-06-09	Ysidro Osornio Velasquez (32)	California (Menifee)	Velasquez was shot and killed by police.
2019-06-09	David Wayne Downs (38)	Oregon (Portland)	Downs was shot and killed by police.
2019-06-09	William James Beck (41)	Arkansas (Shirley)	Beck was shot and killed by police officers.
2019-06-08	Bryan Bernard Wallace (39)	Florida (Clearwater)	Wallace was shot and killed by police.
2019-06-08	Krystal Arvizu (33)	California (Fresno)	Police responded to a domestic violence call, and on approaching the residence were met by Arvizu who was armed with an axe and refused to open the door. Arvizu swung the axe at an officer when he tried to open the door. Arvizu then exited the door holding a knife, and when she charged at the officers they shot and killed her.
2019-06-07	Jason Nash (46)	Tennessee (Bristol)	Nash was shot and killed by police.
2019-06-06	Edtwon Stamps (27)	California (Inglewood)	Following unclear circumstances, Stamps was shot multiple times by police officers after a confrontation, killing him. Afterwards police said that Stamps was in possession of a handgun at the time of his death.
2019-06-06	Jose Antonio De Santiago-Medina (59)	California (Los Angeles)	Santiago-Medina was shot and killed by police officers.
2019-06-06	Ryan Twyman (24)	California (Willowbrook)	24-year old Ryan Twyman, was shot and killed by Sheriffs while in a parked car. He was unarmed. Another person was detained and then released.
2019-06-06	Zendall Noble (58)	Kentucky (Bonnyman)	Noble was shot and killed by police.
2019-06-06	Jose Salvador Meza (35)	California (San Gabriel)	After firing multiple shots, at his neighbors, as suspect barricaded himself in his home and set the residence on fire. Police attempted to enter the burning building, but where confronted by the suspect who shot at them and threw fireworks. A standoff 4 hours long ensued, were the suspect eventually fled the house and attempted to break into and set a neighboring house on fire. The suspect was killed shortly after in a shootout with a SWAT team responding to the scene. The deceased man was later identified as 35-year-old Jose Salvador Meza.
2019-06-06	Harry Gipson (70)	Mississippi (Braxton)	Gipson was shot and killed by police.
2019-06-06	Rodnell Cotton (26)	Missouri (St. Louis)	Cotton was shot and killed by police.
2019-06-06	Jose Jesus Astorga Jr. (37)	California (Modesto)	Astorga was shot and killed by police officers.
2019-06-05	Jay Michael Clem (37)	Arkansas (Jonesboro)	Clem was shot and killed by police officers.
2019-06-05	Matthew Freeseha (39)	California (Escalon)	Police responded to a 911 call were a woman reported that her ex-boyfriend was threatening to kill her and her children. Responding to the scene they were confronted by Freeseha, the ex-boyfriend, who was holding a shotgun. After Freeseha fired at officers with a shotgun the police responded by shooting him multiple times, killing him.
2019-06-05	Scott Hedgecock (54)	North Carolina (Trinity)	Hedgecook called 911 threatening to commit suicide. When police arrived at his house he emerged welding a large knife. Hedgecock did obey commands to drop the weapon, and was shot and killed when he charged at police officers. Investigators are treating the incident as a suicide by cop.
2019-06-05	Fabian Rivera (28)	New Mexico (Bernalillo)	Police responded to a call of shots fired at an apartment. There they confronted Rivera, who was reportedly holding a firearm. In for yet undisclosed reasons the situation escalated and ended with the officers shooting and killing Rivera. An investigation into the incident is ongoing as of June 14, 2019.
2019-06-04	Erik Gebauer (45)	Florida (Indialantic)	Gebauer was shot and killed by police.
2019-06-04	Martin Goodier (56)	Maryland (Davidsonville)	Fire personnel responded to the scene of a crash, when they were confronted by Goodier, the driver of the crashed vehicle. Goodier was holding a knife and acting in a threatening manner, which resulted in the fire fighters calling for backup. A police officer responded to the scene and when Goodier did not obey his commands to drop the knife, the officer fired one at him. Goodier was struck by the bullet and transported to hospital where he later died.
2019-06-04	Samuel Galberth (42)	New York (Ardsley)	In a drug bust, officers approached a motel room with two suspects wanted on robbery and drug charges. Galberth, one of the occupants, refused to surrender and started firing at the officers. A shootout ensued, which ended with Galberth being shot and killed and two officer injured. The other suspect survived and was detained.
2019-06-03	Travis James Eckstein (23)	California (San Ysidro)	At the San Ysidro Port of Entry, a man tried to drive his vehicle through the checkpoint without stopping. When his path was blocked, he started shooting at the police from within his car with the police firing back. The suspect then got out of his car and continued trading gunfire with the police until he was shot and killed. The suspect was later identified as 23-year-old Travis James Eckstein and reportedly suffered from mental illness.
2019-06-03	David Hoal (59)	Tennessee (Collierville)	Hoal was shot and killed by police.
2019-06-03	Kevin Pudlik (41)	Michigan (Detroit)	Pudlik was shot and killed by police.
2019-06-02	Miles Hall (23)	California (Walnut Creek)	Hall was shot and killed by police.
2019-06-01	Marcus Boles (35)	Louisiana (Shreveport)	Boles was shot and killed by police.
2019-06-01	Thomas Goodeyes Gay (35)	Oklahoma (Bartlesville)	Gay was shot and killed by police.
2019-06-01	Nikolai Landry (27)	California (Anderson)	Landry was shot and killed by police.
2019-06-01	Cody Wayne Seals (38)	Texas (Fort Worth)	Seals was shot and killed by police.

== See also ==
- Death in custody § United States
- Henry A. Wallace Police Crime Public Database
- List of cases of police brutality
- List of countries with annual rates and counts for killings by law enforcement officers
- List of law enforcement officers killed in the line of duty in the United States
- List of law enforcement officers convicted for an on-duty killing in the United States
- List of shootings by US immigration agents
- List of police reforms related to the George Floyd protests
- List of unarmed African Americans killed by law enforcement officers in the United States
- Lists of killings by law enforcement officers
- Police brutality in the United States
- Police misconduct § United States
- Police riot § United States
- Police use of deadly force in the United States
