= Southern Hoiho =

Basketball team in Dunedin, New Zealand

- League: Tauihi Basketball Aotearoa
- Founded: 2022
- History: Southern Hoiho; 2022–present
- Arena: Edgar Centre
- Location: Dunedin, New Zealand
- Team colours: Navy & blue
- General manager: Angela Ruske
- Head coach: Todd Marshall
- Championships: 0
- Website: southernhoiho.com

The Southern Hoiho are a New Zealand basketball team based in Dunedin, New Zealand, currently competing in the Tauihi Basketball Aotearoa. Their home arena is the Edgar Centre.

== Team history ==
The Hoiho were one of the founding teams of Tauihi Basketball Aotearoa upon its conception in 2022. Originally playing games in both Dunedin and Queenstown during their first two seasons, the team now plays solely in Dunedin. Originally owned by Sports Entertainment Network (SEN), who were also the owners of the Hoiho's brother team the Otago Nuggets, the team underwent a management change in 2025, and are now owned by a local group.

A poor first season saw them missing out on the inaugural Final 4 with a 1–11 record to place them firmly as the wooden spoon for 2022. However, the 2023 season saw improvement, with the team's 7–5 record good enough for third place and a spot in the Final 4, where they lost in the semi-finals to the Tokomanawa Queens and then in the third place match to the Tauranga Whai, ending fourth overall. The 2024 season saw them bottom of the table once more with a 3–9 record and once again missing out on the Final 4.

== Players ==
=== Current roster ===
Note: Flags indicate national team eligibility at FIBA-sanctioned events. Players may hold other non-FIBA nationalities not displayed.

Southern Hoiho (Tauihi) roster
Players
Coaches

Pos.	No.	Nat.	Name	Ht.
PG	1	(New Zealand)	Duff, Alexa	1.78 m (5 ft 10 in)
G/F	2	(United States)	Wojta, Julie (I)	1.83 m (6 ft 0 in)
G	3	(New Zealand)	Brown, Kiana	1.76 m (5 ft 9 in)
F/C	4	(Germany)	Bertholdt, Marie (I)	1.83 m (6 ft 0 in)
G	7	(New Zealand)	Pavihi, Tia	1.80 m (5 ft 11 in)
F/C	8	(New Zealand)	Pizzey, Rebecca	1.90 m (6 ft 3 in)
G	9	(New Zealand)	Gallaher, Samara	1.76 m (5 ft 9 in)
G	10	(New Zealand)	Simpson, Millicent	1.70 m (5 ft 7 in)
G	12	(Australia)	Dart, Lillian (I)	1.80 m (5 ft 11 in)
F	14	(New Zealand)	Harris, Abby	1.85 m (6 ft 1 in)
PG	22	(United States)	Bradley, Paige (C)	1.76 m (5 ft 9 in)
G/F	24	(New Zealand)	Richards, Zoe	1.86 m (6 ft 1 in)

Head coach

- (New Zealand) Todd Marshall

Assistant coach(es)

- (New Zealand) Natalie Visger
- (New Zealand) Dean Ruske
- (New Zealand) Mattheson Colquhoun
- (New Zealand) Hannah Beade

Legend

- (C) Team captain
- (DP) Development player
- (I) Import player
- Injured

- Roster
Updated: 11 October 2026
