= 2014 McDonald's All-American Girls Game =

East	West
78	80
	1st half	2nd half	Total
East	41	37	78
West	40	40	80
- Date: April 2, 2014
- Venue: United Center, Chicago, Illinois
- MVP: Brianna Turner
- Network: ESPNU

McDonald's All-American

The 2014 McDonald's All-American Girls Game is an All-Star basketball game that was played on April 2, 2014, at the United Center in Chicago, Illinois, home of the Chicago Bulls. The game's rosters featured the best and most highly recruited high school girls graduating in 2014. The game is the 13th annual version of the McDonald's All-American Game first played in 2002.

== 2014 Game ==
The game was roughly even from the tipoff until halftime, as the East only led by 1 point. The second half was much of the same - a close, back and forth game. The East took its first lead of the second half with 8:30 remaining on 2 free throws by Myisha Hines-Allen and then both teams seesawed back and forth until the finish. The East tied up the game again on 2 free throws of their own by A'ja Wilson. The West came back and Jordin Canada found Brianna Turner open right inside the free throw line for the game winning basket to give the West a 2-point win.

== Rosters ==
=== 2014 East Roster ===
ESPNW 100 Rank	Name	Height	Position	Hometown	High school	College choice
9	Lynee' Belton	6–2	C	Clinton, Maryland	Bullis School	Duke
16	Sierra Calhoun	6–0	G	Brooklyn, New York	Christ the King Regional High School	Duke
35	Bianca Cuevas	5–6	G	Bronx, New York	Nazareth Regional	South Carolina
17	Sadie Edwards	5–9	G	Meriden, Connecticut	Blair Academy	Connecticut
34	Myisha Hines-Allen	6–1	F	Montclair, New Jersey	Montclair	Louisville
28	Alexa Middleton	5–8	G	Murfreesboro, Tennessee	Riverdale	Tennessee
5	Kelsey Mitchell	5–8	G	Cincinnati, Ohio	Princeton	Ohio State
42	Mariya Moore	6–0	F	Hercules, California	Salesian	Louisville
11	Shakayla Thomas	5–11	F	Sylacauga, Alabama	Sylacauga	Florida State
	Kathryn Westbeld	6–2	F	Kettering, Ohio	Kettering Fairmont	Notre Dame
7	Jatarie White	6–4	C	Charlotte, North Carolina	Providence Day School	South Carolina
1	A'ja Wilson	6–5	F	Hopkins, South Carolina	Heathwood Hall	South Carolina

=== 2014 West Roster ===
ESPNW 100 Rank	Name	Height	Position	Hometown	High school	College choice
3	Ariel Atkins	5–11	G	Dallas, Texas	Duncanville	Texas
19	Recee' Caldwell	5–8	G	San Antonio, Texas	Homeschooled	UCLA
4	Jordin Canada	5–6	G	Los Angeles, California	Windward School	UCLA
10	Mikayla Cowling	6–1	F	Benicia, California	Saint Mary's College High School	California
8	Lajahna Drummer	6–2	F	Inglewood, California	Long Beach Poly	UCLA
12	Gabby Green	6–1	F	Oakland, California	Saint Mary's College High School	California
29	Brooke McCarty	5–4	G	Madisonville, Texas	Clear Springs	Texas
6	Jaime Nared	6–1	F	Portland, Oregon	Westview	Tennessee
20	Alyssa Rice	6–3	C	Reynoldsburg, Ohio	Reynoldsburg High School	Kentucky
2	Brianna Turner	6–3	F	Pearland, Texas	Manvel High School	Notre Dame
27	Chatrice White	6–3	C	Shelby, Nebraska	Shelby-Rising City High School	Illinois
14	Gabby Williams	5–11	G	Sparks, Nevada	Edward C. Reed High School	Connecticut

=== Coaches ===
The East team was coached by:

- Head Coach — Angie Hembree of Norcross High School (Norcross, Georgia)
- Assistant coach — Jay Nebel of Norcross High School (Buford, Georgia)
- Assistant coach — Tamara Brooks of Norcross High School (Norcross, Georgia)

The West team was coached by:

- Head Coach - Randy Napier of Perry County Central High School (Bonnyman, Kentucky)
- Assistant coach - Kevin Whitman of Perry County Central High School (Hazard, Kentucky)
- Assistant coach - Jeff Campbell of Perry County Central High School (Hazard, Kentucky)

== Game ==
ESPNU

April 2, 2014
06:00

East	78–80	West
Scoring by half: 41–40, 37–40
Pts: Shakayla Thomas 19; Rebs: A'ja Wilson 9 Asts: Kelsey Mitchell 6		Pts: Jaime Nared 15; Rebs: Brianna Turner 10; Asts: Jordin Canada 7

United Center, Chicago, IL

== See also ==
2014 McDonald's All-American Boys Game
