= Bonnyman =

Bonnyman may refer to the following:

== People ==
- Alexander Bonnyman Jr. (1910-1943), United States Marine Corps officer
- Jack Bonnyman (b. 1920), Australian rugby league footballer
- Phil Bonnyman (b. 1954), Scottish association football (soccer) player

== Places ==
Bonnyman, Kentucky, an unincorporated community and coal town in Perry County, Kentucky, United States.
