= Jaime Nared =

American basketball player (born 1995)

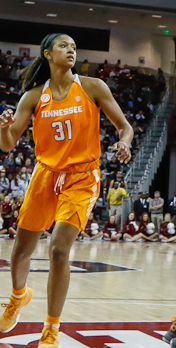
- Nared with Tennessee in 2017

No. 31 – Tokomanawa Queens
- Position: Shooting guard / small forward
- League: WNBA; Tauihi Basketball Aotearoa

Personal information
- Born: September 14, 1995 (age 31) Portland, Oregon
- Listed height: 6 ft 2 in (1.88 m)

Career information
- High school: Westview (Portland, Oregon)
- College: Tennessee (2014–2018)
- WNBA draft: 2018: 2nd round, 13th overall pick
- Drafted by: Las Vegas Aces
- Playing career: 2018–present

Career history
- 2018–2019: Las Vegas Aces
- 2018–2019: Elitzur Ramla
- 2019–2020: Della Fiore Broni
- 2020–2021: Flammes Carolo Basket Ardennes
- 2021–2022: Enisey Krasnoyarsk
- 2022: Antalya 07 Basketbol
- 2022–present: Tokomanawa Queens

Career highlights
- TBA champion (2022); Israeli League champion (2019); Israeli Cup winner (2019); TBA All-Star Five (2022); First-team All-SEC (2018); Second-team All-SEC (2017); McDonald's All-American (2014)
- Stats at Basketball Reference

Jaime Nicole Nared (/ˈdʒeɪmi ˈnɑːrd/; born September 14, 1995) is an American professional basketball player for the Tokomanawa Queens.

== College career ==
Nared played college basketball for the Tennessee Lady Volunteers between 2014 and 2018.

=== Statistics ===
Legend
GP	Games played	GS	Games started	MPG	Minutes per game
FG%	Field goal percentage	3P%	3-point field goal percentage	FT%	Free throw percentage
RPG	Rebounds per game	APG	Assists per game	SPG	Steals per game
BPG	Blocks per game	PPG	Points per game	**Bold**	Career high

Year	Team	GP	Points	FG%	3P%	FT%	RPG	APG	SPG	BPG	PPG
2014–15	Tennessee	**36**	187	37.7%	22.2%	83.1%	3.5	1.1	0.7	0.3	5.2
2015–16	Tennessee	27	223	34.2%	26.5%	74.1%	4.8	1.6	0.8	0.3	8.3
2016–17	Tennessee	32	500	**42.3%**	**37.8%**	**87.6%**	6.9	1.7	1.2	0.3	15.6
2017–18	Tennessee	33	**550**	39.1%	24.1%	82.0%	**7.4**	**2.5**	**2.2**	**0.6**	**16.7**
Career		128	1460	39.0%	28.8%	82.7%	5.6	1.7	1.2	0.4	11.4

== Professional career ==
Nared was selected 13th overall by the Las Vegas Aces in the 2018 WNBA draft. She made her WNBA debut for the Aces that year.

After playing in Israel for Elitzur Ramla during the 2018–19 season, Nared returned to the Aces for the 2019 WNBA season.

For the 2019–20 season, Nared played in Italy for Della Fiore Broni. She then played in France in 2020–21 for Flammes Carolo Basket Ardennes.

Nared split the 2021–22 season in Russia with Enisey Krasnoyarski kraj and in Turkey with Antalya 07 Basketbol. She then moved to New Zealand to play in the Tauihi Basketball Aotearoa for the Tokomanawa Queens, where she was named to the league's All-Star Five for the inaugural 2022 season. She helped the Queens win the 2022 championship.

== WNBA career statistics ==
Legend
GP	Games played	GS	Games started	MPG	Minutes per game	RPG	Rebounds per game
APG	Assists per game	SPG	Steals per game	BPG	Blocks per game	PPG	Points per game
TO	Turnovers per game	FG%	Field-goal percentage	3P%	3-point field-goal percentage	FT%	Free-throw percentage
**Bold**	Career best	°	League leader

=== Regular season ===
Year	Team	GP	GS	MPG	FG%	3P%	FT%	RPG	APG	SPG	BPG	TO	PPG
2018	Las Vegas	**31**	0	**9.1**	**.300**	**.226**	**.857**	**1.5**	**0.5**	**0.4**	**0.1**	0.5	**2.5**
2019	Las Vegas	1	0	1.0	.000	.000	.000	0.0	0.0	0.0	0.0	0.0	0.0
Career	1 year, 1 team	32	0	8.9	.300	.226	.857	1.4	0.4	0.4	0.1	0.5	2.5
