= 2019 Dallas courthouse shooting =

Shooting in Dallas, Texas

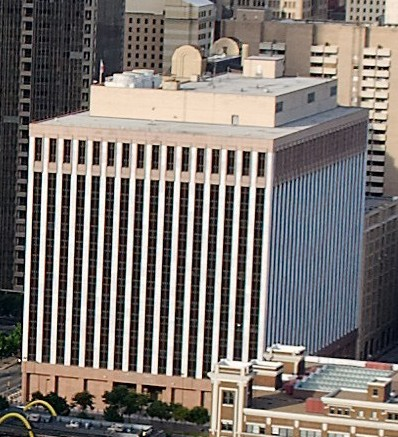
- Earl Cabell Federal Building, the location where the shooting took place.

- Dallas (Texas) Dallas (the United States)
- Location: 32°47′42″N 96°47′56″W; Dallas, Texas, U.S.
- Date: June 17, 2019; 7 years ago 8:40 pm (MDT (UTC−5))
- Attack type: Shooting
- Weapon: DPMS Oracle AR-15-style semi-automatic rifle
- Deaths: 1 (the perpetrator)
- Injuries: 1 (indirectly)
- Perpetrator: Brian Isaack Clyde

On June 17, 2019, a shooting occurred at the Earle Cabell Federal Building and Courthouse in Dallas, Texas, United States. No law enforcement officers or civilians were injured in the shooting, though one person sustained a superficial injury when she was taking cover. The shooter, identified as Brian Isaack Clyde, was then shot and killed by one or more federal officers.

== Shooting ==
A man, identified as Brian Isaack Clyde, opened fire near Earle Cabell Federal Building and Courthouse, before making his way to the glass door of the building and opening fire inside. Three security officers employed by Paragon systems and contracted by the Federal Protective Service returned fire. Following an exchange of gunfire, in which Clyde was mortally wounded by one or more federal officers, he ran towards the parking lot and fired five more rounds before he collapsed. Federal officers performed CPR and took Clyde to the Baylor University Medical Center, approximately 2 miles (3.2 km) from the courthouse, where he was pronounced deceased. Authorities later detonated his vehicle. At the time of the shooting, Clyde was carrying more than 150 rounds of ammunition.

Photojournalist Tom Fox, who works for The Dallas Morning News, was at the courthouse on assignment to take pictures of a defendant in a charter school fraud case when the shooting started; he was able to capture two photos of the suspect through a telephoto zoom lens before taking cover behind a pillar adjacent to the entrance. He took a video and additional photos of the scene after the suspect had been shot by law enforcement officers.

== Perpetrator ==
Brian Isaack Clyde (September 30, 1996 – June 17, 2019), a 22-year-old male from Plano, Texas, was a private first class in the U.S. Army, and was honorably discharged after serving as an infantryman from August 2015 to February 2017. According to The Dallas Morning News, he was stationed at Fort Campbell in Kentucky. He was not deployed to a war zone during his time in the military.

His mother, originally from Panama, and his father divorced when Brian Clyde was a toddler. Clyde attended Woodrow Wilson High School in Dallas for part of his freshman year in 2012, but later withdrew and moved south to Austin later that year.

At the time of the shooting, Clyde had recently graduated from Del Mar College in Corpus Christi, Texas, with an associate degree in applied science in nondestructive testing technology. He stayed for a week in Plano with his father before moving to an apartment in Fort Worth to take a job with an aerospace company.

Although Clyde had not been of "investigative interest" to the FBI, his half-brother had contacted the Federal Bureau of Investigation (FBI) three years before the shooting, alleging that Clyde was suicidal and had a fascination with guns. The FBI did not follow up on the tip because there was no specific threat specified. Investigations into his social media history took place.

=== Motive ===
Clyde appears to have self-radicalized online, posting memes related to the incel subculture that appeals to men who feel lonely and alienated, and, ultimately, getting "sucked into a hateful vortex that tells them that their lives are only valuable if they go out bringing death" to others.

Clyde had uploaded extremist far-right memes including ideas about the Confederate States and Nazism. Some of his posts were transphobic and others were anti-feminist. In April 2019 he posted a meme suggesting that combining eco-friendly and libertarian ideas with far-right authoritarianism, symbolized by what the Daily Beast describes as "a green flag with a Nazi swastika in the middle", could be the "solution to all of our nation’s political problems."

Clyde's family spoke publicly a few days later at their home in Plano, stating that their son had been in a mental institution for two weeks nearly six months before he was discharged from the Army in 2017. He was placed as a patient at Bayne-Jones Army Community Hospital in Fort Johnson South, Louisiana during a training exercise at Fort Polk that simulated combat conditions. They believed that it was a case of suicide by cop following the shooting.

== Aftermath ==
A Maryland Air Force base was inspired by the Dallas shooting to initiate a program teaching personnel to recognize the warning signs that "introverted, sexless individuals" may be drawn to the "incel" online subculture.

On March 18, 2020, a man pleaded guilty to threatening to assassinate the governor of New Mexico, Michelle Lujan Grisham. He cited Clyde as an inspiration for his desired attack.

On May 4, 2020, Tom Fox was nominated for a Pulitzer Prize for Breaking News Photography for his photographs of several people fleeing, Clyde himself, and Clyde being attended to, respectively. However, the prize went to Reuters for their photography of the 2019 Hong Kong protests.
