= Recee Fox =

American basketball player (born 1996)

Personal information
- Born: September 9, 1996 (age 29) Hemet, California, U.S.
- Listed height: 5 ft 9 in (1.75 m)

Career information
- High school: Lady Bird Johnson High School (San Antonio, Texas)
- College: UCLA (2014–2015) Texas Tech (2016–2018) California (2018–2019)
- WNBA draft: 2018: undrafted
- Playing career: 2019–2019
- Position: Guard

Career history
- 2019: Seattle Storm

Career highlights
- McDonald's All-American (2014)
- Stats at Basketball Reference
Medals
Women's basketball
Representing the United States
Women's basketball
FIBA Americas U16 Championship
Gold medal – first place	2011 Mexico	Team

Recee Adrianna Fox (née Caldwell; born September 9, 1996) is an American former basketball player. Fox played in college for the UCLA Bruins, Texas Tech, and the California Golden Bears. Fox worked for the Texas Longhorns as a Video Coordinator and in the front office for both the Golden State Warriors and the Washington Wizards.

== Early life and education ==
Fox was born on September 9, 1996, to Ray and Alba Caldwell. Her father was a basketball coach, taking his daughter to a Los Angeles Sparks game when she was a child.

Fox grew up in San Antonio and attended Lady Bird Johnson High School until she stopped in her junior year to be homeschooled.

== Basketball career ==
Fox made the USA Basketball U-16 and U-18 national teams, winning gold twice at the FIBA World Championships. Fox played in the McDonald's All-American game in 2014.

Fox played at UCLA for her freshman year, after which, she transferred to Texas Tech as her father took a coaching job at the college, Fox played two seasons at Texas Tech.

Fox attended UC Berkeley for her master's degree.

Fox has worked in the front office for both the Golden State Warriors and the Washington Wizards.

== Personal life ==
Fox is married to NBA guard De'Aaron Fox who proposed to Caldwell on September 10, 2020, at the beach. They got married in August 2022.

In February 2023, they had their first child together, a son named Reign.
