= Kenisha Bell =

American basketball player (born 1996)

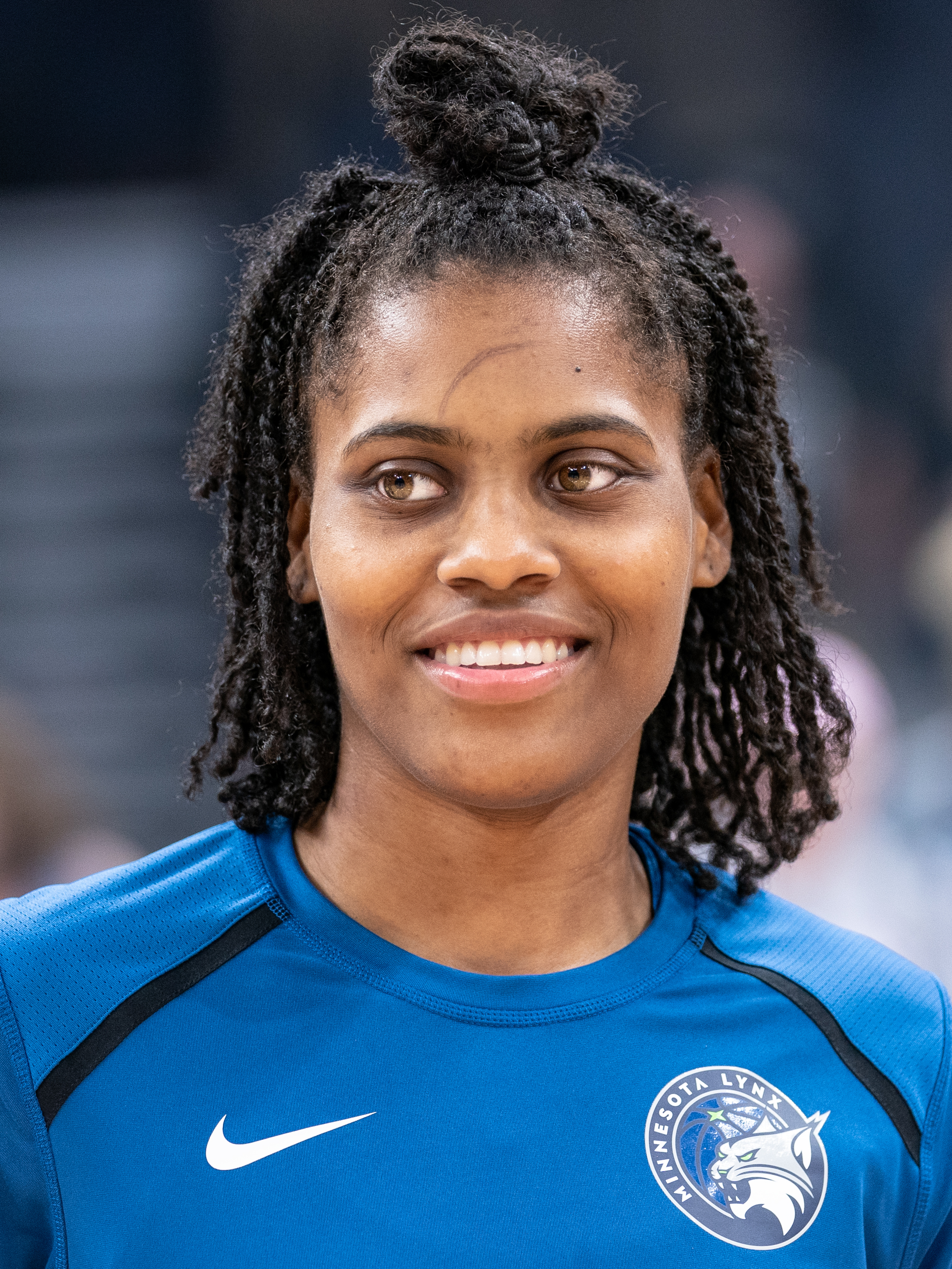
- Bell in 2019

Free agent
- Position: Guard

Personal information
- Born: May 25, 1996 (age 30) Chicago, Illinois
- Listed height: 5 ft 9 in (1.75 m)

Career information
- High school: Kennedy (Bloomington, Minnesota)
- College: Marquette (2014–2015); Minnesota (2016–2019)
- WNBA draft: 2019: 3rd round, 30th overall pick
- Drafted by: Minnesota Lynx
- Playing career: 2019–present

Career history
- 2019: Minnesota Lynx

Career highlights
- 2x Big Ten All-Defensive Team (2018, 2019); 2x First-team All-Big Ten (2018, 2019); Big East All-Freshman Team (2015)
- Stats at Basketball Reference

Kenisha Bell is an American professional basketball player. Bell began her college career at Marquette University and then played for the University of Minnesota. Professionally she played briefly with the Minnesota Lynx.

== Family and early years ==
Bell was born in Chicago, IL the daughter of Aishia Bell and Brian Townsend. She has nine brothers, three of whom play college basketball, and seven sisters. Her brother Brandon Bell ran track at Marquette University. She majored in communications at the University of Minnesota.

== College career ==
After starting her college career with Marquette in 2014, Bell transferred to Minnesota the following season. After redshirting her first year, Bell spent three seasons with Minnesota and made one trip to the NCAA tournament in the 2017–18 season.

== Marquette and Minnesota statistics ==
Legend
GP	Games played	GS	Games started	MPG	Minutes per game
FG%	Field goal percentage	3P%	3-point field goal percentage	FT%	Free throw percentage
RPG	Rebounds per game	APG	Assists per game	SPG	Steals per game
BPG	Blocks per game	PPG	Points per game	**Bold**	Career high

Year	Team	GP	Points	FG%	3P%	FT%	RPG	APG	SPG	BPG	PPG
2014-15	Marquette	30	434	39.8%	22.5%	68.9%	5.2	2.7	2.0	**0.4**	14.5
2016-17	Minnesota	30	482	37.7%	28.6%	**77.6%**	4.2	4.9	2.2	0.2	16.1
2017-18	Minnesota	33	**661**	**42.3%**	**35.8%**	73.3%	5.4	**6.8**	**2.6**	0.1	**20.0**
2018-19	Minnesota	32	610	39.4%	27.1%	69.8%	**5.9**	4.4	2.0	0.2	19.1
Career		125	2187	39.9%	29.3%	72.4%	5.2	4.8	2.2	0.2	17.5

== Professional career ==
Bell was drafted by the Minnesota Lynx with the 30th pick in the 2019 WNBA draft. She played two preseason games with the Lynx before being waived in end of May.

== WNBA career statistics ==
Legend
GP	Games played	GS	Games started	MPG	Minutes per game	RPG	Rebounds per game
APG	Assists per game	SPG	Steals per game	BPG	Blocks per game	PPG	Points per game
TO	Turnovers per game	FG%	Field-goal percentage	3P%	3-point field-goal percentage	FT%	Free-throw percentage
**Bold**	Career best	°	League leader

=== Regular season ===
Year	Team	GP	GS	MPG	FG%	3P%	FT%	RPG	APG	SPG	BPG	TO	PPG
2019	Minnesota	3	0	3.7	.000	.000	.000	0.3	0.3	0.0	0.0	0.3	0.0
Career	1 year, 1 team	3	0	3.7	.000	.000	.000	0.3	0.3	0.0	0.0	0.3	0.0
