= Tauranga Whai =

Basketball team in Bay Plenty, New Zealand

- League: NZNBL
- Founded: December 2021
- History: Tauranga Whai; 2024–present
- Arena: Mercury Baypark
- Location: Tauranga, Bay of Plenty, New Zealand
- Team colours: Turquoise & navy blue
- General manager: John Miller (spokesperson)
- Head coach: Matt Lacey
- Ownership: Bay of Plenty Basketball Foundation
- Championships: 0
- Website: Whai.basketball

The Tauranga Whai are a New Zealand professional basketball team based in Tauranga, Bay of Plenty. The Whai compete in the National Basketball League (NBL) and play their home games at Mercury Baypark.

== Team history ==
In December 2021, the Bay of Plenty Basketball Foundation were granted a license to enter a men's team into the National Basketball League (NBL) for the 2024 season. The team was initially named the Bay of Plenty Stingrays. The team was rebranded as Whai in the lead up to their first season and then later officially branded Tauranga Whai. The word whai as a noun means stingray in Māori. As a verb, whai means to chase or pursue.

In October 2023, Whai Basketball announced Matt Lacey as their inaugural men's coach. In their NBL debut on 28 March 2024, the Whai defeated the Hawke's Bay Hawks 91–70 at Mercury Baypark. The Whai finished their first season in eighth place with an 8–12 record.

== Season by season record ==
Note: GP = Games played, W = Wins, L = Losses, W–L% = Winning percentage

Season	GP	W	L	W–L%	Finish
2024	20	8	12	.400	8th
2025	20	9	11	.450	6th Won Play-in (Taranaki, 83–67); Lost Semi Final (Wellington, 93–68)

(*) Denotes season still in progress

== Current roster ==
Note: Flags indicate national team eligibility at FIBA-sanctioned events. Players may hold other non-FIBA nationalities not displayed.

Tauranga Whai (NZNBL) roster
Players
Coaches

Pos.	No.	Nat.	Name	Ht.
C	1	(New Zealand)	Kelly, Josh	2.01 m (6 ft 7 in)
G	2	(Australia)	Stoddart, Nicholas (I)	1.88 m (6 ft 2 in)
G	3	(New Zealand)	Wade, Michael	1.86 m (6 ft 1 in)
G	4	(New Zealand)	Thompson, Jett	1.91 m (6 ft 3 in)
F	5	(New Zealand)	Hopoi, Cole	1.96 m (6 ft 5 in)
G	6	(New Zealand)	Murray, Taine	1.96 m (6 ft 5 in)
G/F	7	(New Zealand)	Te Rangi, Reuben	1.98 m (6 ft 6 in)
G	8	(New Zealand)	Marsters, Xanda	1.88 m (6 ft 2 in)
F	10	(New Zealand)	Saxon, Kiani	2.03 m (6 ft 8 in)
F	11	(New Zealand)	Ngatai, Jordan	1.96 m (6 ft 5 in)
F	12	(New Zealand)	Kaumoana, Ky-Mani	1.90 m (6 ft 3 in)
G	13	(New Zealand)	Flavell, C. J.	1.88 m (6 ft 2 in)
G	21	(New Zealand)	Rapson, Flynn
C	22	(Australia)	Tata, Nicolas (I)	2.08 m (6 ft 10 in)
F	29	(New Zealand)	Hoeata, Geordie	2.00 m (6 ft 7 in)
G	31	(New Zealand)	Black, Javier
F/C	34	(New Zealand)	Rissetto, Anzac	2.08 m (6 ft 10 in)
G	66	(New Zealand)	Bezzant, Jayden (C)	1.88 m (6 ft 2 in)

Head coach

- (New Zealand) Matt Lacey

Assistant coach(es)

- (New Zealand) Tane Bennett
- (New Zealand) Sonny Tuaputa

Legend

- (C) Team captain
- (DP) Development player
- (I) Import player
- Injured

- Roster
Updated: 24 June 2026

== Women's team ==
Whai Basketball debuted in 2022 with a women's team, Mid-North Whai, in the inaugural season of the Tauihi Basketball Aotearoa. In 2024, the team became known as Tauranga Whai alongside their male counterpart. As of 2024, the team plays their home games at Queen Elizabeth Youth Centre. The Whai won the 2024 Tauihi Basketball Aotearoa championship with a 90–71 grand final victory over the Tokomanawa Queens. The Whai won back-to-back titles in 2025 with a 93–66 win over the Mainland Pouākai in the grand final.

=== Women's roster ===
Note: Flags indicate national team eligibility at FIBA-sanctioned events. Players may hold other non-FIBA nationalities not displayed.

Tauranga Whai (Tauihi) roster
Players
Coaches

Pos.	No.	Nat.	Name	Ht.
SF	0	(New Zealand)	Ohia, Carly	1.83 m (6 ft 0 in)
F	4	(Australia)	Pitman, Carla (I)	1.78 m (5 ft 10 in)
G	5	(New Zealand)	Shearer, Emme	1.83 m (6 ft 0 in)
G	6	(New Zealand)	Broughton, Charis	1.69 m (5 ft 7 in)
G	7	(New Zealand)	Miringaorangi, Keija	1.76 m (5 ft 9 in)
G	8	(New Zealand)	Broughton, Shamar	1.72 m (5 ft 8 in)
PG	9	(New Zealand)	Rogers, Sophie	1.66 m (5 ft 5 in)
SF	10	(New Zealand)	Langton, Eva	1.85 m (6 ft 1 in)
G	12	(United States)	Gilday, Nicolette (I)	1.75 m (5 ft 9 in)
F	13	(New Zealand)	Gillard, Isabella	1.93 m (6 ft 4 in)
PF	14	(United States)	Synder, Laina (I)	1.85 m (6 ft 1 in)
F/C	24	(New Zealand)	Tahata, Emilee	1.80 m (5 ft 11 in)
G/F	31	(New Zealand)	Strawbridge, Ashlee	1.78 m (5 ft 10 in)
F	34	(Germany)	Brossmann, Patricia (I)	1.85 m (6 ft 1 in)
G	74	(New Zealand)	Taingahue, Maya	1.70 m (5 ft 7 in)

Head coach

- (New Zealand) Tane Bennett

Assistant coach(es)

- (New Zealand) Sonny Tuaputa

Legend

- (C) Team captain
- (DP) Development player
- (I) Import player
- Injured

- Roster
Updated: 11 October 2026
