= Taylor Emery =

American professional basketball player

Personal information
- Born: August 26, 1997 (age 29) Bremerton, Washington
- Listed height: 5 ft 10 in (1.78 m)

Career information
- High school: Freedom High School (New Tampa, Florida)
- College: Tulane (2015–2016); Gulf Coast State (2016–2017); Virginia Tech (2017–2019)
- WNBA draft: 2019: undrafted
- Playing career: 2019–present
- Position: Guard

Career highlights
- NJCAA Division I champion (2017); AAC All-Freshman Team (2016)
- Stats at Basketball Reference

Taylor Emery (born August 26, 1997) is an American professional basketball player.

== Early years ==
Born in Bremerton, Washington, the daughter of Emmett Emery and Michelle Griffin, Emery has three siblings and attended Freedom High School in Tampa, Florida. She was a member of the National Honors Society, the National Science Honors Society, and Mu Alpha Theta for honors in mathematics.

Emery began her college career at Tulane University, followed by one season at Gulf Coast State College and then played for Virginia Tech. She majored in creative writing, writes poetry, and plans to become a veterinarian.

== College career ==
Emery began her college career at Tulane University, where she averaged 6.2 points in 2015–16. She made the American Athletic Conference's all-freshman team. She transferred to Gulf Coast State College after the season where she went on to averaged 19 points per game, leading her team to the National Junior College Athletic Association Division I crown. In 2017 she moved again, this time to Virginia Tech where she finished here college career in 2019, averaging 18.7 points for her senior season and being named Second Team All-ACC.

=== Tulane and Virginia Tech statistics ===
Ratios
Year	Team	GP	FG%	3P%	FT%	RBG	APG	BPG	SPG	PPG
2015–16	Tulane	35	46.7%	28.6%	59.6%	3.40	0.80	0.06	0.97	6.17
2016–17	Gulf Coast State	Stats not found								
2017–18	Virginia Tech	36	49.1%	38.8%	85.7%	4.56	1.61	0.47	1.14	18.53
2018–19	Virginia Tech	34	43.0%	38.5%	85.2%	5.21	2.09	0.27	0.82	19.00
Career		105	46.1%	37.8%	81.3%	4.38	1.50	0.27	0.98	14.56

Totals
Year	Team	GP	FG	FGA	3P	3PA	FT	FTA	REB	A	BK	ST	PTS
2015–16	Tulane	35	86	184	10	35	34	57	119	28	2	34	216
2016–17	Gulf Coast State	Stats not found											
2017–18	Virginia Tech	36	236	481	69	178	126	147	164	58	17	41	667
2018–19	Virginia Tech	34	221	514	77	200	127	149	177	71	9	28	646
Career		105	543	1179	156	413	287	353	460	157	28	103	1529

== Professional career ==
After going undrafted in the 2019 WNBA draft, Emery was signed by the Minnesota Lynx in April 2019. She was waived by the Lynx in May the same year after appearing in one preseason game where she scored 2 points.
