= Earle Cabell Federal Building and Courthouse =

Building in Dallas, Texas, United States

Coordinates: 32°46′44″N 96°48′07″W

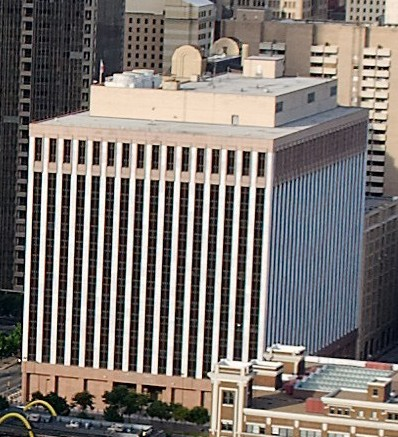
The Earle Cabell Federal Building viewed from the Reunion Tower

The Earle Cabell Federal Building and Courthouse, named for former Dallas mayor Earle Cabell, is located in the Government District of downtown Dallas, Texas, United States. It houses the United States District Court for the Northern District of Texas, which exercises original jurisdiction over 100 counties in North and West Texas; United States Bankruptcy and Magistrate Courts; a United States Attorney office; an IRS office; passport offices; and other federal offices. Built in 1971, it shares a wall with the Art Deco-style Federal Building, previously known as the Santa Fe Building. It was listed on the National Register of Historic Places in 2023.

== Incidents ==
In 1995, the building was evacuated following a bomb threat called in to the IRS office.

On June 30, 2015, an envelope containing white powder was discovered in an office on the 14th floor. The Dallas Fire-Rescue Department determined that the powder was chalk; no one was injured in the incident.

On June 17, 2019, a lone shooter, identified as former Army infantryman Brian Isaack Clyde, opened fire at the building. Building security returned fire, fatally wounding the gunman. Clyde then collapsed in the parking lot before being rushed to the Baylor University Medical Center and being pronounced dead. There were no other casualties, although one employee was reported to have suffered superficial injuries when she took cover.

== See also ==
- 2019 Dallas courthouse shooting
