= Brianna Turner =

American basketball player (born 1996)

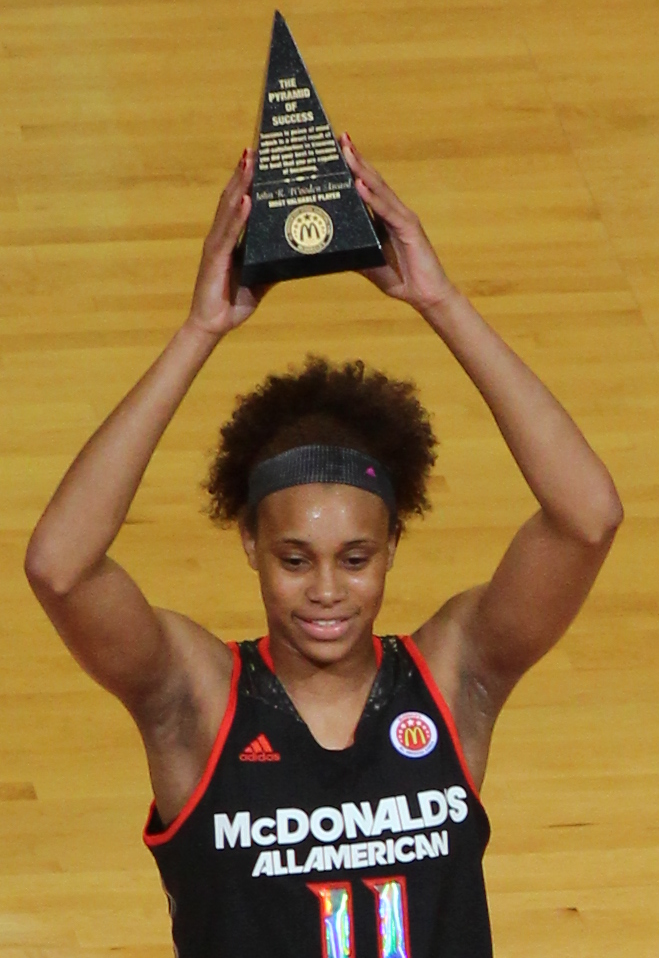
- Turner was MVP of the 2014 McDonald's All-American Game

No. 21 – Las Vegas Aces
- Position: Power forward / center
- League: WNBA

Personal information
- Born: July 5, 1996 (age 30) Pearland, Texas, U.S.
- Listed height: 6 ft 3 in (1.91 m)
- Listed weight: 175 lb (79 kg)

Career information
- High school: Westbury Christian School (Houston, Texas); Manvel (Manvel, Texas)
- College: Notre Dame (2014–2019)
- WNBA draft: 2019: 1st round, 11th overall pick
- Drafted by: Atlanta Dream
- Playing career: 2019–present

Career history
- 2019–2023: Phoenix Mercury
- 2019–2020: Adelaide Lightning
- 2020–2021: Nika Syktyvkar
- 2021–2022: Virtus Bologna
- 2022: Çankaya Üniversitesi S.K.
- 2023–2025: Adelaide Lightning
- 2024: Chicago Sky
- 2025: Indiana Fever
- 2025: Perth Lynx
- 2026–present: Las Vegas Aces

Career highlights
- WNBA Commissioner's Cup winner (2025); 2× WNBA All-Defensive First Team (2020, 2021); WNBA All-Rookie Team (2019); NCAA champion (2018); 2× WBCA All-American (2016, 2017); 2× All-American – USBWA (2016, 2017); 2× Second-team All-American – AP (2016, 2017); 3× ACC Defensive Player of the Year (2016, 2017, 2019); 3× First-team All-ACC (2015–2017); 4× ACC All-Defensive Team (2015–2017, 2019); ACC Rookie of the Year (2015); ACC All-Freshman Team (2015); Gatorade Female Athlete of the Year (2014); Gatorade National Player of the Year (2014); McDonald's All-American Game MVP (2014); First-team Parade All-American (2014); Texas Miss Basketball (2014)
- Stats at Basketball Reference
Medals
Women's basketball
Representing the United States
FIBA Under-18 Americas Championship
Gold medal – first place	2014 United States	Team
FIBA Under-19 World Cup
Gold medal – first place	2013 Lithuania	Team
FIBA Under-17 World Cup
Gold medal – first place	2012 Netherlands	Team
Women's 3x3 basketball
Representing the United States
FIBA 3x3 Under-18 World Cup
Gold medal – first place	2013 Indonesia	Team
FIBA 3x3 U-18 World Championships
Gold medal – first place	2012 Spain	Team

Brianna Turner (born July 5, 1996) is an American professional basketball player for the Las Vegas Aces of the Women's National Basketball Association (WNBA). She played college basketball for the Notre Dame Fighting Irish and has competed for the United States women's national basketball team.

== College career ==
Turner played college basketball at the University of Notre Dame in Notre Dame, Indiana for the Fighting Irish. Turner led Notre Dame to the 2017 NCAA Division I women's basketball tournament as a #1 seed after a 30–3 regular season record. During a game against Purdue in the second round of the tournament, Turner ruptured her ACL and was done for the season. She later announced that she would miss the 2017–18 season because of the same injury. She returned for her final season of eligibility in 2018–19 after receiving a hardship waiver from the NCAA.

== Professional career ==
=== WNBA ===
==== Phoenix Mercury (2019–2023) ====
At the 2019 WNBA draft, Turner was selected in the first round by the Atlanta Dream and was then quickly traded to the Phoenix Mercury. In the 2019 WNBA season, she was named to the All-Rookie Team. She was named to the WNBA All-Defensive First Team in back-to-back seasons (2020–21), averaging 1.6 blocks and 0.9 steals across her second and third seasons in the league.

==== Chicago Sky (2024) ====
On February 6, 2024, Turner was acquired by the Chicago Sky in a trade with the Mercury.

==== Indiana Fever (2025) ====
On February 17, 2025, Turner signed with the Indiana Fever for the 2025 WNBA season.

=== Overseas ===
Turner joined the Adelaide Lightning of the Women's National Basketball League (WNBL) in Australia for the 2019–20 season.

For the 2020–21 season, Turner joined Russian team Nika Syktyvkar. For the 2021–22 season, she joined Italy team Virtus Bologna. She began the 2022–23 season in Turkey with Çankaya Üniversitesi S.K. but left in November 2022 after seven games.

For the 2023–24 WNBL season, Turner returned to the Adelaide Lightning. She played a third season with the Lightning in 2024–25.

On October 14, 2025, Turner signed with the Perth Lynx on a short-term contract to start the 2025–26 WNBL season, playing in the first eight games.

=== Athletes Unlimited ===
Turner is set to join Athletes Unlimited Pro Basketball for its fifth season starting in February 2026.

== National team career ==
Turner has competed for the United States women's national basketball team at the 2012 FIBA Under-17 World Championship, 2013 FIBA Under-19 World Championship and 2014 FIBA Americas Under-18 Championship.

== Personal life ==
Turner is a native of Pearland, Texas. After spending her freshman season at Westbury Christian School in Houston, she graduated from Manvel High School in Manvel, Texas.

Turner has advocated for LGBTQ+ rights and equality, and specifically for transgender women in women's sports.

== Career statistics ==
Legend
GP	Games played	GS	Games started	MPG	Minutes per game	FG%	Field goal percentage
3P%	3-point field goal percentage	FT%	Free throw percentage	RPG	Rebounds per game	APG	Assists per game
SPG	Steals per game	BPG	Blocks per game	TO	Turnovers per game	PPG	Points per game
**Bold**	Career high	*	Led Division I

*	Denotes season(s) in which Turner won an NCAA Championship

=== WNBA ===
==== Regular season ====
WNBA regular season statistics
Year	Team	GP	GS	MPG	FG%	3P%	FT%	RPG	APG	SPG	BPG	TO	PPG
2019	Phoenix	29	12	15.9	.538	—	.731	4.1	.5	.2	.7	.7	4.0
2020	Phoenix	22	22	27.9	.579	.000	.643	9.0	1.8	1.1	**2.0**	1.4	7.2
2021	Phoenix	32	32	31.1	.554	.000	.717	**9.4**	1.8	.8	1.3	1.5	**7.8**
2022	Phoenix	35	**35**	**33.4**	.607	—	.500	6.8	**2.3**	**1.2**	1.6	1.4	4.3
2023	Phoenix	40	33	26.3	**.650**	—	.500	5.1	1.3	1.0	1.1	1.5	3.5
2024	Chicago	27	2	9.4	.615	—	.500	2.0	.4	.3	.5	.4	1.2
2025	Indiana	27	0	8.6	.406	.000	.500	1.9	.6	.1	.3	**.3**	1.1
2026	Las Vegas	**41**	7	13.2	.554	—	**1.000**	2.3	.2	.3	.6	.6	1.6
**Career**	8 years, 4 teams	253	143	21.0	.573	.000	.637	5.2	1.1	.6	1.0	1.0	3.7

==== Playoffs ====
WNBA playoff statistics
Year	Team	GP	GS	MPG	FG%	3P%	FT%	RPG	APG	SPG	BPG	TO	PPG
2019	Phoenix	1	1	23.0	.000	—	—	4.0	.0	.0	1.0	**.0**	.0
2020	Phoenix	2	2	**39.5**	.800°	—	.250	**12.5**	**4.0**	1.0	**2.0**	2.5	**8.5**
2021	Phoenix	**11**	**11**	31.5	.548	—	.684	9.9	2.5	**1.3**	1.9	1.2	**8.5**
2022	Phoenix	2	2	30.0	.444	—	—	11.5°	2.5	.0	.5	1.0	4.0
2025	Indiana	8	0	17.9	.667	—	**.750**	3.5	.6	.9	.5	.9	2.4
2026	Las Vegas	6	5	11.2	**1.000**	—	—	2.3	.3	.0	.3	.3	.3
**Career**	6 years, 3 teams	30	21	23.9	.570	—	.630	6.8	1.6	.8	1.1	1.0	4.6

=== College ===
NCAA statistics
Year	Team	GP	GS	MPG	FG%	3P%	FT%	RPG	APG	SPG	BPG	TO	PPG
2014–15	Notre Dame	36	34	25.5	**.651***	.000	.605	**7.8**	.6	1.0	2.4	2.0	13.7
2015–16	Notre Dame	29	29	27.0	.593	.000	.639	7.3	.9	.8	**3.0**	**1.4**	14.5
2016–17	Notre Dame	35	35	**28.6**	.619	.000	.594	7.1	1.1	.8	2.4	1.8	**15.3**
2017–18	Notre Dame	Did not play due to injury											
2018–19	Notre Dame	**39**	**39**	27.8	.631	.000	**.701**	**7.8**	**1.5**	**1.1**	2.7	1.5	14.3
**Career**		139	137	27.3	.624	.000	.636	7.5	1.1	.9	2.6	1.7	14.5
