= Tauihi Basketball Aotearoa =

Premier women's basketball league in New Zealand

Tauihi Basketball Aotearoa TBA
- Sport: Basketball
- Founded: December 2021
- First season: 2022
- General manager: Maree Taylor
- No. of teams: 5
- Countries: New Zealand
- Continent: FIBA Oceania (Oceania)
- Most recent champion: Tauranga Whai (2nd title)
- Most titles: Tauranga Whai (2 titles)
- Broadcaster: Sky Sport
- Level on pyramid: 1
- Website: Tauihi.Basketball

The Tauihi Basketball Aotearoa is a women's professional basketball league in New Zealand.

== History ==
In December 2021, a new women's national basketball league was established for 2022 with five new franchises. The league's name Tauihi Basketball Aotearoa was announced in March 2022, with Tauihi meaning "to soar" and Aotearoa meaning New Zealand in Māori language. The inaugural teams included Northern Kāhu, Mid-North Whai, Tokomanawa Queens, Mainland Pouākai, and Southern Hoiho. The Queens were crowned the inaugural champions.

All five inaugural franchises continued for the league's second season in 2023. The Kāhu were crowned the 2023 champions.

In April 2024, the league announced a new season window of October to December and that international expansion was being explored. Increased player payments was also implemented in order to attract top women's players from around the world. The Whai were crowned the 2024 champions.

For the 2025 season, there had been a planned introduction of the Indian Panthers to the Tauihi Basketball Aotearoa, but following the collapse of the franchise in the men's NBL, the women's Panthers were also abolished. The Whai went on to win the 2025 championship to earn back-to-back titles.

== Current clubs ==
Club	City(ies)	Region(s)	Arena(s)	Colours	Debut season
Mainland Pouākai	Christchurch	Canterbury	Parakiore Recreation and Sport Centre		2022
Northern Kāhu	Auckland; Whangārei	Auckland Region; Northland	Eventfinda Stadium; Franklin Pool and Leisure Centre; McKay Stadium; The Trusts Arena		2022
Southern Hoiho	Dunedin; Queenstown	Otago	Edgar Centre; Queenstown Events Centre		2022
Tauranga Whai	Tauranga	Bay of Plenty	Queen Elizabeth Youth Centre		2022
Tokomanawa Queens	Porirua	Wellington Region	Te Rauparaha Arena		2022

Location of TBA clubs within New Zealand

== League championships ==
Club	Win(s)	Loss(es)	Total	Year(s) won	Year(s) lost
Tauranga Whai	2	0	2	2024, 2025	–
Tokomanawa Queens	1	2	3	2022	2023, 2024
Northern Kāhu	1	1	2	2023	2022
Mainland Pouākai	0	1	1	–	2025
Southern Hoiho	0	0	0	–	–

== See also ==
- National Basketball League (New Zealand)
- New Zealand women's national basketball team
