= Bonnyman, Kentucky =

Unincorporated community in Kentucky, United States

Bonnyman
- Unincorporated community
- Location within the state of Kentucky Bonnyman (the United States)
- Coordinates: 37°17′23″N 83°14′11″W
- Country: United States
- State: Kentucky
- County: Perry
- Elevation: 981 ft (299 m)
- Time zone: UTC-5 (Eastern (EST))
  - Summer (DST): UTC-4 (EDT)
- ZIP codes: 41719
- GNIS feature ID: 487672

Bonnyman is an unincorporated community and coal town in Perry County, Kentucky, United States. Their Post Office opened in 1918.
