= Tokomanawa Queens =

Basketball team in Porirua, New Zealand

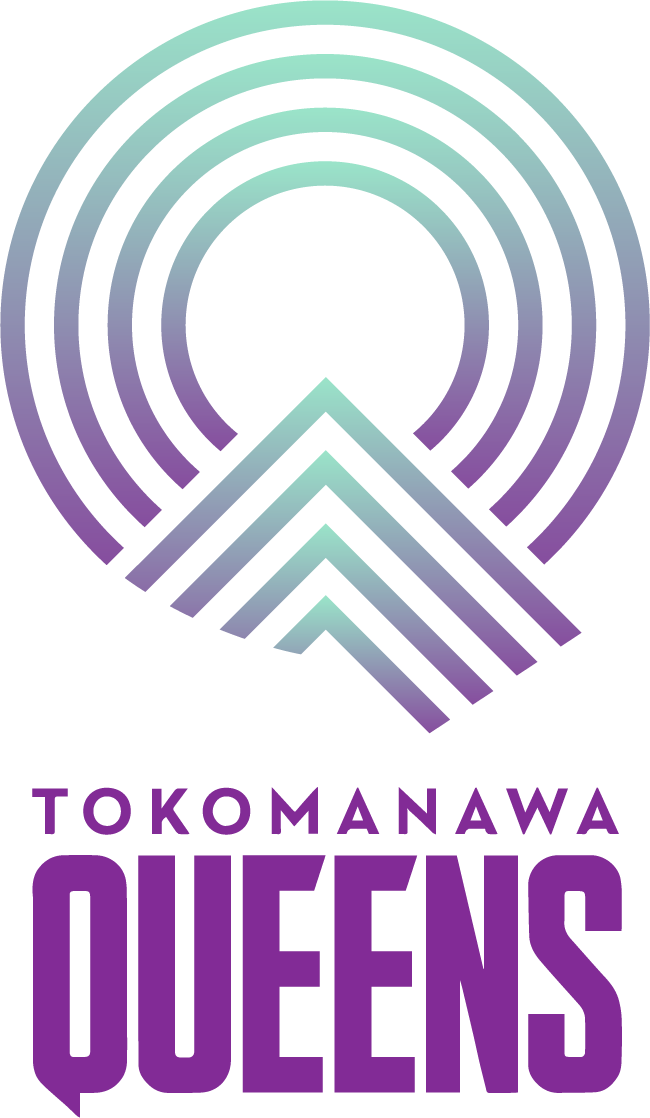
- League: Tauihi Basketball Aotearoa
- Founded: 2022
- History: Tokomanawa Queens; 2022–present
- Arena: Te Rauparaha Arena
- Location: Porirua, New Zealand
- Team colours: Purple & turquoise
- Chairman: Rachel Taulelei
- Championships: 1 (2022)
- Website: Queens.nz

The Tokomanawa Queens are a New Zealand basketball team based in Porirua, New Zealand. The Queens compete in the Tauihi Basketball Aotearoa and play their home games at Te Rauparaha Arena.

== Team history ==
The Queens were established as a strongly female-led operation behind co-owners Rachel Taulelei and Megan Compain.

The Queens won the inaugural Tauihi championship in 2022. They were runners-up in 2023 and 2024.

== Players ==
=== Current roster ===
Note: Flags indicate national team eligibility at FIBA-sanctioned events. Players may hold other non-FIBA nationalities not displayed.

Tokomanawa Queens (Tauihi) roster
Players
Coaches

Pos.	No.	Nat.	Name	Ht.
F	0	(New Zealand)	Ikenasio, Victoria	1.85 m (6 ft 1 in)
G	1	(New Zealand)	Cowley, Aria	1.70 m (5 ft 7 in)
F	2	(United States)	Collins, Amira (I)	1.90 m (6 ft 3 in)
G	4	(New Zealand)	Leger-Walker, Krystal	1.75 m (5 ft 9 in)
G	5	(New Zealand)	Leger-Walker, Charlisse	1.78 m (5 ft 10 in)
G	6	(New Zealand)	Hunter, Grace	1.78 m (5 ft 10 in)
G	8	(New Zealand)	Williams, Ameia	1.75 m (5 ft 9 in)
PG	10	(United States)	Van Lith, Hailey (I)	1.75 m (5 ft 9 in)
G	11	(United States)	Mikesell, Taylor (I)	1.78 m (5 ft 10 in)
G	21	(New Zealand)	Flavell, Matangiroa	1.80 m (5 ft 11 in)
F	22	(Australia)	Rhebok, Alaska (I)	1.80 m (5 ft 11 in)
F	25	(New Zealand)	Lacey-Rameka, Cassidy	1.84 m (6 ft 0 in)
G	47	(New Zealand)	Toeleiu, Nahala	1.79 m (5 ft 10 in)

Head coach

- (New Zealand) Tania Tupu

Assistant coach(es)

- (New Zealand) Melanie Bennett

Legend

- (C) Team captain
- (DP) Development player
- (I) Import player
- Injured

- Roster
Updated: 11 October 2026

=== 2026-2027 Season ===
In August 2026, Charlisse Leger-Walker and her sister Krystal announced that they will be joining the Queens in September 2026.

In September 2026, the team announced that Hailey Van Lith will also join the team. Van Lith is teammates with Charlisse Leger-Walker on the Connecticut Sun.
